= 2009 New York Sentinels season =

American football team season

- Owner: Bill Mayer
- General manager: Rick Mueller
- Head coach: Ted Cottrell
- Home stadium: Giants Stadium; James M. Shuart Stadium; Rentschler Field

Results
- Record: 0–6
- Division place: 4th
- Playoffs: did not qualify

Uniform

The 2009 New York Sentinels season was the first and only season for the New York Sentinels. In the United Football League's Premiere Season, the Sentinels went winless by posting a 0–6 record, finishing in fourth place.

== Draft ==
The draft took place on June 19, 2009. Those selected were among participants in earlier workouts held in Orlando as well as Las Vegas. Once a player was picked by a team, his rights were held by that team should he elect to play in the UFL.

= Indicates player signed with team

Player	Position	College
C. J. Bachér	QB	Northwestern
Trey Brown	DB	UCLA
Oliver Celestin	DB	Texas Southern
Richard Clebert	NT	South Florida
Sean Estrada	G	Pennsylvania
Maurice Fountain	DE	Clemson
Ronnie Ghent	TE	Louisville
Tyronne Gross	RB	Eastern Oregon
Samuel Gutekunst	T	None
Jasper Harvey	C	San Diego State
Brian Johnson	QB	Utah
Noriaki Kinoshita	WR	Ritsumeikan
David Lofton	DB	Stanford
Marc Magro	LB	West Virginia
Terrell Maze	DB	San Diego State
Ray Norell	T	Buffalo
Ramiro Pruneda	T	Monterrey Tech
Joe Rubin	RB	Portland State
Steve Sanders	WR	Bowling Green
Cecil Sapp	RB	Colorado State
Bryan Save	NT	Colorado State
Michale Spicer	DE	Western Carolina
LaBrandon Toefield	RB	LSU
Nathan Williams	LB	Murray State
Shannon Woods	RB	Texas Tech

== Staff ==
2009 New York Sentinels staff
Front office: Owner – Bill Mayer; Vice President/General Manager (UFL) – Rick Mueller; Head coaches: Head coach – Ted Cottrell; Offensive coaches: Offensive coordinator – Wes Chandler; Quarterbacks/Tight Ends – Jeff Rutledge; Running backs – Earle Mosley; Offensive line – John Tice	Defensive coaches: Defensive coordinator – Don Blackmon; Defensive line – Thurmond Moore; Secondary – Kevin Ross; Defensive assistant – Derrick Burroughs; Special teams coaches: Special teams – Pete Rodriguez

== Roster ==
2009 New York Sentinels final roster
Quarterbacks: 14 C. J. Bachér; 5 Quinn Gray; 3 Ingle Martin; Running backs: 28 Charles Ali; 21 Tyronne Gross; 33 Noah Herron; 24 Marlon Lucky; 32 Cecil Sapp; 22 LaBrandon Toefield; 26 Shannon Woods; Wide receivers: 11 Daron Clark; 81 Cortez Hankton; 7 Ryan Hoag; 12 Steve Sanders; 9 Jamayel Smith; 8 Craphonso Thorpe; Tight ends: 88 T. J. Cottrell; 87 Charles Davis; 86 Ronnie Ghent; 84 Christian Hopkins	Offensive linemen: 67 Nate Bennett G; 64 Elton Brown G; 72 Mike Fladell G/T; 63 Jasper Harvey C; 74 Steve Justice C/G; 65 Orrin Thompson T; 60 Michael Toudouze T; 79 Jason Watkins T; Defensive linemen: 90 Ryan Boschetti DE; 99 Maurice Fountain DE; 96 Brigham Harwell DT; 97 Simeon Rice DE; 98 Bryan Save DT; 92 Jonas Seawright DT; 93 Michale Spicer DE	Linebackers: 55 Chase Bullock MLB; 91 Charlton Keith OLB; 56 Joe Mortensen MLB; 54 Rian Wallace OLB; 53 Leon Williams OLB; 51 Nathan Williams OLB; Defensive backs: 27 Tra Battle FS; 20 Brian Bonner SS; 36 David Lofton SS; 34 Terrell Maze CB; 29 David Pittman CB; 37 Paul Pratt CB; 23 Matterral Richardson CB; 41 Darien Williams SS	Special teams: 10 Scott Player P; 61 Jared Retkofsky LS; 1 Taylor Rowan K; Reserve lists: 24 Chris Barclay RB (IR); 62 Louis Ellis DT (IR); 78 Dan Oliphant T (IR); 64 Erik Robertson C/G (IR); 19 Koren Robinson WR (Susp.); 29 Joe Rubin RB (IR); 25 Tony Tiller CB (IR); rookies in italics 52 Active, 7 Inactive

== Schedule ==
Week	Date	Opponent	Result	Record	Venue	Attendance	Ref.
1	October 10	at Florida Tuskers	L 13–35	0–1	Citrus Bowl	11,203	
2	October 17	at California Redwoods	L 7–24	0–2	AT&T Park	6,341	
3	Bye						
4	October 29	California Redwoods	L 13–20	0–3	Giants Stadium	10,818	
5	November 4	Las Vegas Locomotives	L 10–41	0–4	James M. Shuart Stadium	4,392	
6	November 12	Florida Tuskers	L 6–24	0–5	Rentschler Field	5,201	
7	November 20	at Las Vegas Locomotives	L 7–41	0–6	Sam Boyd Stadium	13,306	

== Standings ==
United Football League
	W	L	T	PCT	PF	PA	STK
y-Florida Tuskers	6	0	0	1.000	183	92	W6
y-Las Vegas Locomotives	4	2	0	.667	167	100	W3
California Redwoods	2	4	0	.333	105	134	L2
New York Sentinels	0	6	0	.000	56	185	L6

y-denotes team advanced to 2009 UFL championship game

== Game summaries ==
=== Week 1: at Florida Tuskers ===
Quarter	1	2	3	4	Total
Sentinels	7	6	0	0	13
Tuskers	0	14	14	7	35

at Citrus Bowl, Orlando, Florida

- Date: Saturday, October 10, 2009
- Game time: 7:00 p.m. ET
- Game attendance: 11,203
- Referee: Randy Christal
- TV announcers (HDNet): Kenny Rice & Paul Maguire

Game information

1st quarter

- NY – Craphonso Thorpe 11-yard pass from Quinn Gray (Piotr Czech kick), 12:52

2nd quarter

- NY – Piotr Czech 32-yard field goal, 15:00
- FL – Frank Murphy 9-yard pass from Brooks Bollinger (Matt Bryant kick), 3:54
- FL – Taye Biddle 35-yard pass from Brooks Bollinger (Matt Bryant kick), 2:52
- NY – Piotr Czech 42-yard field goal, 0:13

3rd quarter

- FL – Chas Gessner 16-yard pass from Brooks Bollinger (Matt Bryant kick), 9:58
- FL – Ryan Neufeld 1-yard pass from Brooks Bollinger (Matt Bryant kick), 6:30

4th quarter

- FL – Tatum Bell 1-yard run (Matt Bryant kick), 11:55

Passing

- NY – Quinn Gray – 12/29, 161 yards, 1 TD, 1 INT
- FL – Brooks Bollinger – 20/26, 225 yards, 4 TD, 1 INT

Rushing

- NY – LaBrandon Toefield – 10 att, 34 yards
- FL – Tatum Bell – 15 att, 70 yards, 1 TD

Receiving

- NY – Craphonso Thorpe – 4 rec, 77 yards, 1 TD
- FL – Chas Gessner – 4 rec, 59 yards, 1 TD

=== Week 2: at California Redwoods ===
Quarter	1	2	3	4	Total
Sentinels	0	7	0	0	7
Redwoods	7	0	7	10	24

at AT&T Park, San Francisco, California

- Date: Saturday, October 17, 2009
- Game time: 9:00 p.m. ET
- Game attendance: 6,341
- Referee: Jon Bible
- TV announcers (HDNet): Kenny Rice & Paul Maguire

Game information

1st quarter

- CA – Kai Brown 2-yard pass from Mike McMahon (Parker Douglass kick), 9:39

2nd quarter

- NY – Chris Barclay 2-yard pass from Quinn Gray (Piotr Czech kick), 9:04

3rd quarter

- CA – Cory Ross 1-yard run (Parker Douglass kick), 5:11

4th quarter

- CA – Parker Douglass 42-yard field goal, 11:45
- CA – John David Washington 1-yard run (Parker Douglass kick), 3:19

Passing

- NY – Quinn Gray – 12/25, 115 yards, 1 TD, 1 INT
- CA – Mike McMahon – 16/29, 145 yards, 1 TD, 2 INT

Rushing

- NY – Chris Barclay – 13 att, 13 yards
- CA – Cory Ross – 22 att, 121 yards, 1 TD

Receiving

- NY – Craphonso Thorpe – 4 rec, 31 yards
- CA – Doug Gabriel – 5 rec, 66 yards

=== Week 4: vs. California Redwoods ===
Quarter	1	2	3	4	Total
Redwoods	7	10	0	3	20
Sentinels	0	6	7	0	13

at Giants Stadium, East Rutherford, New Jersey

- Date: Thursday, October 29, 2009
- Game time: 7:00 p.m. ET
- Game attendance: 10,818
- Referee: Jon Bible
- TV announcers (Versus): Dave Sims & Doug Flutie

Game information

1st quarter

- CA – Cory Ross 25-yard pass from Shane Boyd (Parker Douglass kick), 10:19

2nd quarter

- NY – Piotr Czech 36-yard field goal, 12:36
- CA – Parker Douglass 27-yard field goal, 8:09
- CA – Shane Boyd 5-yard run (Parker Douglass kick), 0:26
- NY – Piotr Czech 45-yard field goal, 0:00

3rd quarter

- NY – Christian Hopkins 5-yard pass from Quinn Gray (Piotr Czech kick), 2:17

4th quarter

- CA – Parker Douglass 44-yard field goal, 2:37

Passing

- CA – Shane Boyd – 18/23, 197 yards, 1 TD, 1 INT
- NY – Quinn Gray – 22/32, 213 yards, 1 TD

Rushing

- CA – Cory Ross – 23 att, 77 yards
- NY – LaBrandon Toefield – 12 att, 51 yards

Receiving

- CA – Cory Ross – 7 rec, 68 yards, 1 TD
- NY – Craphonso Thorpe – 9 rec, 73 yards

=== Week 5: vs. Las Vegas Locomotives ===
Quarter	1	2	3	4	Total
Locomotives	10	14	3	14	41
Sentinels	0	7	3	0	10

at James M. Shuart Stadium, Hempstead, New York

- Date: Wednesday, November 4, 2009
- Game time: 7:00 p.m. ET
- Game attendance: 4,392
- Referee: Dave Cutaia
- TV announcers (Versus): Dave Sims & Doug Flutie

Game information

1st quarter

- LV – Marcel Shipp 1-yard run (Graham Gano kick), 6:36
- LV – Graham Gano 44-yard field goal, 0:22

2nd quarter

- LV – Marcel Shipp 6-yard run (Graham Gano kick), 10:17
- NY – Steve Sanders 2-yard pass from Ingle Martin (Piotr Czech kick), 2:28
- LV – Adam Bergen 14-yard pass from J. P. Losman (Graham Gano kick), 0:53

3rd quarter

- NY – Piotr Czech 38-yard field goal, 6:57
- LV – Graham Gano 49-yard field goal, 0:13

4th quarter

- LV – Josh Scobey 17-yard pass from J. P. Losman (Graham Gano kick), 9:18
- LV – Trey Young 75-yard interception return (Graham Gano kick), 6:45

Passing

- LV – J. P. Losman – 27/37, 277 yards, 2 TD
- NY – Ingle Martin – 21/36, 173 yards, 1 TD, 1 INT

Rushing

- LV – Marcel Shipp – 12 att, 34 yards, 2 TD
- NY – Shannon Woods – 12 att, 45 yards

Receiving

- LV – Josh Scobey – 5 rec, 73 yards, 1 TD
- NY – Shannon Woods – 2 rec, 34 yards

=== Week 6: vs. Florida Tuskers ===
Quarter	1	2	3	4	Total
Tuskers	10	0	7	7	24
Sentinels	3	3	0	0	6

at Rentschler Field, Hartford, Connecticut

- Date: Thursday, November 12, 2009
- Game time: 7:00 p.m. ET
- Game attendance: 5,201
- Referee: Randy Christal
- TV announcers (Versus): Dave Sims & Doug Flutie

=== Week 7: at Las Vegas Locomotives ===
Quarter	1	2	3	4	Total
Sentinels	0	0	0	7	7
Locomotives	7	10	21	3	41

at Sam Boyd Stadium, Whitney, Nevada

- Date: Friday, November 20, 2009
- Game time: 9:00 p.m. ET
- Game attendance: 13,306
- Referee: Jon Bible
- TV announcers (HDNet): Kenny Rice & Paul Maguire

Game information

1st quarter

- LV – Ezra Butler 17-yard blocked kick return (Graham Gano kick), 13:44

2nd quarter

- LV – Jake Nordin 4-yard pass from Tim Rattay (Graham Gano kick), 12:39
- LV – Graham Gano 32-yard field goal, 5:40

3rd quarter

- LV – Samie Parker 3-yard pass from Tim Rattay (Graham Gano kick), 11:04
- LV – Marcel Shipp 1-yard run (Graham Gano kick), 8:49
- LV – DeDe Dorsey 5-yard run (Graham Gano kick), 2:37

4th quarter

- NY – Charles Ali 1-yard run (Graham Gano kick), 13:25
- LV – Graham Gano 34-yard field goal, 6:46

Passing

- NY – Ingle Martin – 11/23, 131 yards, 2 INT
- LV – Tim Rattay – 10/21, 97 yards, 2 TD

Rushing

- NY – Shannon Woods – 8 att, 24 yards
- LV – DeDe Dorsey – 14 att, 60 yards, 1 TD

Receiving

- NY – Cortez Hankton – 6 rec, 68 yards
- LV – David Kircus – 2 rec, 37 yards
