= Marc Magro =

American football player (born 1984)

No. 53
- Position: Linebacker

Personal information
- Born: August 23, 1984 (age 42); Morgantown, West Virginia, U.S.
- Listed height: 6 ft 3 in (1.91 m)
- Listed weight: 246 lb (112 kg)

Career information
- College: West Virginia
- NFL draft: 2008: undrafted

Career history
- St. Louis Rams (2008)*; Miami Dolphins (2008)*; Tampa Bay Buccaneers (2008)*; New York Sentinels (2009)*
- * Offseason or practice squad member only

Awards and highlights
- Second-team All-Big East (2007)
- Stats at Pro Football Reference

Marc Anthony Magro (born August 23, 1984) is an American former football linebacker. He was signed by the St. Louis Rams as an undrafted free agent in 2008. He played college football at West Virginia.

Magro was also a member of the Miami Dolphins, Tampa Bay Buccaneers, and New York Sentinels.

== Early life ==
As a senior at University High School, Magro earned All-State honors as he helped lead his team to a 9-3 record and the second round of the West Virginia playoffs. He recorded 154 tackles, 28 for a loss, and five sacks in his career. He was also a baseball letterman.

== College career ==
Magro enrolled at West Virginia University in 2003 and redshirted during the season.

In 2004, his redshirt-freshman season, Magro saw time on every special teams unit. He recorded 32 tackles on the season, including a team-high 10 tackles in the win over James Madison. He also had six tackles against UConn and four against Boston College.

In 2005, Magro played backup linebacker to Jay Henry. He recorded 41 tackles as a three-year sophomore, beginning with three in the Wofford victory. As Henry was injured in the game against East Carolina, Magro made nine tackles, two sacks, and forced two fumbles. Against Virginia Tech, Magro had 8 tackles and a tackle for a loss. He had a key seven-yard sack in the victory over UConn and in the 2006 Sugar Bowl, he had two tackles and recovered a fumble against the Georgia. He earned the Ideal Mountaineer Man Award at the end of the season from head coach Rich Rodriguez.

In 2006, Magro saw moderate starting time at middle linebacker. He played alongside senior Boo McLee at outside linebacker. To start the season, Magro recorded six tackles and a tackle for a loss in the Friends of Coal Bowl against Marshall. He also had a team-best five tackles against Eastern Washington. In the Maryland victory, Magro had six tackles and three pass break-ups. In the victory over UConn, Magro had four tackles and a tackle for a loss. He suffered a stinger against South Florida, but still recorded three tackles in the loss. Magro earned the Gridiron Gladiator Award from head coach Rich Rodriguez at the end of the season and the 2006 Iron Mountaineer Award for his performance in the winter workout program.

Magro earned the starting job in 2007 at middle linebacker, playing alongside Mortty Ivy and Reed Williams. Magro, along with Eric Wicks was named to the Lott Trophy watch list. In his final collegiate game, the 2008 Fiesta Bowl win over Oklahoma, he recorded four tackles. He finished the season with 64 tackles, three sacks, two forced fumbles, and a fumble recovery.

Magro earned second-team all-Big East honors and was selected by the National Football Foundation and College Football Hall of Fame's Hampshire Honor Society as a scholar-athlete after the 2007 season. He, along with Pat White, and Johnny Dingle, was named an Honorable Mention All-American by Sports Illustrated.com.

== Professional career ==
=== Pre-draft ===
Magro worked out at West Virginia's Pro Day on March 13, 2008. His 28 bench reps was one of the top for any prospect for the 2008 NFL draft on their respective Pro Day workout.

Pre-draft measurables
Height	Weight	40-yard dash	10-yard split	20-yard split	20-yard shuttle	Three-cone drill	Vertical jump	Broad jump	Bench press
6 ft 1 5/8 in (1.87 m)	244 lb (111 kg)	4.85 s	1.66 s	2.81 s	4.31 s	7.07 s	37 in (0.94 m)	9 ft 8 in (2.95 m)	28 reps
All values from Pro Day.

=== St. Louis Rams ===
Magro went undrafted in the 2008 NFL draft. Then on May 5, he signed with the St. Louis Rams. In his first preseason game as a Ram, he was third on the team with five tackles against the Tennessee Titans. He was released on August 30 but was re-signed to the team's practice squad following the preseason. He was released from the practice squad on September 24 when wide receiver Matt Caddell was re-signed.

=== Miami Dolphins ===
Magro was signed to the practice squad of the Miami Dolphins on October 6, 2008. The team released linebacker Tyson Smith to make room for Magro on the practice squad. Magro was released on October 14 and replaced by linebacker William Kershaw.

=== Tampa Bay Buccaneers ===
Magro was signed to the practice squad of the Tampa Bay Buccaneers on November 12, 2008. He replaced wide receiver Brian Clark, who was promoted to the active roster. Magro was released on December 3, 2008.

=== New York Sentinels ===
Magro was drafted by the New York Sentinels of the United Football League in the UFL Premiere Season Draft. He signed with the team on August 5, 2009.
