= Jasper Harvey =

American football player and coach (born 1983)

No. 63, 72
- Position: Offensive line coach

Personal information
- Born: April 8, 1983 (age 43); New Orleans, Louisiana, U.S.
- Listed height: 6 ft 3 in (1.91 m)
- Listed weight: 305 lb (138 kg)

Career information
- High school: Archbishop Shaw
- College: San Diego State
- NFL draft: 2006: undrafted

Career history

Playing
- Washington Redskins (2006)*; Philadelphia Eagles (2006–2007)*; → Berlin Thunder (2007); Orlando Predators (2008); Arizona Cardinals (2008)*; New York Sentinels (2009); San Jose SaberCats (2011–2012)
- * Offseason or practice squad member only

Coaching
- San Jose SaberCats (2012–2014) (OL)

Career AFL statistics
- Receptions: 2
- Receiving yards: 18
- Receiving touchdowns: 1
- Total tackles: 4
- Stats at ArenaFan.com

Jasper Harvey (born April 8, 1983) is an American former football offensive lineman. He was signed by the Washington Redskins as an undrafted free agent in 2006. He played college football at San Diego State.

Harvey was also a member of the Philadelphia Eagles, Berlin Thunder, Orlando Predators, Arizona Cardinals, New York Sentinels and San Jose SaberCats.

== Professional career ==
Harvey was drafted by the New York Sentinels of the United Football League in the UFL Premiere Season Draft. He signed with the team on September 9, 2009.
