= David Lofton =

American gridiron football player (born 1984)

No. 42, 36
- Position: Safety

Personal information
- Born: January 28, 1984 (age 42); Plano, Texas, U.S.
- Listed height: 6 ft 4 in (1.93 m)
- Listed weight: 220 lb (100 kg)

Career information
- High school: Plano (TX) West
- College: Stanford
- NFL draft: 2007: undrafted

Career history
- Miami Dolphins (2007)*; Hamilton Tiger-Cats (2007); Toronto Argonauts (2008–2009)*; New York Sentinels (2009)
- * Offseason or practice squad member only

Career CFL statistics
- Total tackles: 34
- Sacks: 2

David Lofton (born January 28, 1984) is an American former professional football safety. He was signed by the Miami Dolphins as an undrafted free agent in 2007. He played college football at Stanford.

Lofton was also a member of the Hamilton Tiger-Cats, Toronto Argonauts and New York Sentinels. He is the son of former NFL wide receiver and Hall of Famer James Lofton.

== Early life ==
Lofton was born in Honolulu, Hawaii. He was named one of the top prep players in the state of Texas during his senior year at Plano West Senior High School.

== College career ==
Lofton attended Stanford University as an Urban Studies academic major and was a National Achievement Scholar finalist and National Merit Scholarship Program semifinalist.

He began play for the Stanford Cardinal football team in 2002 as a true freshman quarterback and did not play. In the spring of 2003, he converted to the wide receiver position but saw limited playing time though he did catch two balls for 10 yards in the season finale.

In 2004, he changed positions again, this time to the safety position, where he saw time as a reserve free safety and special teams player.

Lofton played in all 11 games of the 2005 Cardinals season including five weeks as the starting free safety, finishing the year with 35 total tackles and one tackle-for-loss. He started six games and played the first seven of the 2006 season with a stress fracture in his foot before suffering a season-ending fracture that caused him to miss the final five games. He finished the year seventh on the team with 47 total tackles.

== Professional career ==
=== Miami Dolphins ===
Lofton went undrafted in the 2007 NFL draft and signed as an undrafted free agent with the Miami Dolphins on May 27, 2007, attended training camp, and was released on July 29.

=== Hamilton Tiger-Cats ===
Lofton then signed with the Hamilton Tiger-Cats of the Canadian Football League as a free agent on September 12 and dressed for four games (four starts) of the 2007 CFL season making 17 defensive tackles, 1 special teams tackle, and 1 quarterback sack. He was released following off-season surgery.

=== Toronto Argonauts ===
The Toronto Argonauts signed Lofton as a free agent on September 23 of the 2008 Toronto Argonauts season and placed him on the practice squad for week 13 before deferring his contract on September 29. He was re-signed on March 25, 2009. He was released on May 12, 2009.

=== New York Sentinels ===
Lofton was drafted by the New York Sentinels of the United Football League in the UFL Premiere Season Draft in 2009. He signed with the team on August 27.

== Personal life ==
Lofton is the son of former NFL Hall of Fame wide receiver James Lofton. James Lofton coached five seasons in San Diego with then-offensive coordinator Cam Cameron, who originally signed David Lofton out of college in 2007. The elder Lofton also attended Stanford, from 1974 to 1977. David Lofton gave his father's Pro Football Hall of Fame induction speech in 2003.
