= Tyronne Gross =

American football player (born 1983)

No. 22, 21
- Position: Running back

Personal information
- Born: May 14, 1983 (age 43); Stockton, California, U.S.
- Listed height: 5 ft 9 in (1.75 m)
- Listed weight: 213 lb (97 kg)

Career information
- College: Eastern Oregon
- NFL draft: 2006: undrafted

Career history
- San Diego Chargers (2006–2007); New York Sentinels (2009)

Tyronne Gross (born May 14, 1983) is an American former football running back. He was signed by the San Diego Chargers as an undrafted free agent in 2006. He played college football at Eastern Oregon.

== Early life ==
Gross attended Lincoln High School in Stockton, California and was a student and a letterman in football. Tyronne Gross graduated from Lincoln High School in 2001.

== College career ==
Gross played college football at Sacramento State University and Eastern Oregon University.

== Professional career ==
=== San Diego Chargers ===
After going undrafted in the 2006 NFL draft, Gross signed with the San Diego Chargers as an undrafted free agent. He spent his entire rookie season on the team's practice squad.

Gross suffered a dislocated kneecap during the 2007 preseason and was placed on season-ending injured reserve. He was not tendered as an exclusive-rights free agent in the 2008 offseason and spent the rest of the year out of football.

=== New York Sentinels ===
Gross was drafted by the New York Sentinels of the United Football League in the UFL Premiere Season Draft. He signed with the team on August 5, 2009.
