= Charles Davis (tight end) =

American football player (born 1983)

No. 88, 87
- Position: Tight end

Personal information
- Born: March 13, 1983 (age 43); Fraser, Michigan, U.S.
- Listed height: 6 ft 5 in (1.96 m)
- Listed weight: 260 lb (118 kg)

Career information
- High school: St. Mary's Preparatory (Orchard Lake Village, Michigan)
- College: Purdue
- NFL draft: 2006: 5th round, 167th overall pick

Career history
- Pittsburgh Steelers (2006)*; New York Giants (2006)*; Carolina Panthers (2006)*; New York Giants (2007)*; → Berlin Thunder (2007); Jacksonville Jaguars (2007–2009)*; San Diego Chargers (2009)*; New York Sentinels (2009); Hartford Colonials (2010); San Diego Chargers (2011)*
- * Offseason or practice squad member only

Awards and highlights
- Second-team All-Big Ten (2004)
- Stats at Pro Football Reference

Charles Suonne Davis, Jr. (born March 13, 1983) is an American former professional football tight end. He was selected by the Pittsburgh Steelers in the fifth round of the 2006 NFL draft. He played both college football and college basketball at Purdue.

Davis was also a member of the New York Giants, Berlin Thunder, Carolina Panthers, Jacksonville Jaguars, San Diego Chargers, New York Sentinels and Hartford Colonials.

== Professional career ==
Pre-draft measurables
Height	Weight	Arm length	Hand span	40-yard dash	10-yard split	20-yard split	20-yard shuttle	Three-cone drill	Vertical jump	Broad jump	Bench press
6 ft 5 1/2 in (1.97 m)	263 lb (119 kg)	32 5/8 in (0.83 m)	10 in (0.25 m)	4.85 s	1.72 s	2.86 s	4.37 s	7.38 s	33.0 in (0.84 m)	9 ft 7 in (2.92 m)	27 reps
All values from NFL Combine/Pro Day

=== San Diego Chargers (first stint) ===
Davis was signed by the San Diego Chargers on August 1, 2009. He was released on September 5.

=== New York Sentinels ===
Davis was selected by the New York Sentinels on the UFL premiere season draft in 2009. In 2010, Davis played for the Hartford Colonials of the UFL after New York ceased operations. He was re-signed for the 2011 season by Hartford. He became a free agent on August 10, 2011 when the Colonials were contracted.

=== San Diego Chargers (second stint) ===
On August 17, 2011, Davis re-signed with the Chargers.
