= Terrell Maze =

American gridiron football player (born 1984)

No. 20, 25, 34
- Position: Cornerback

Personal information
- Born: March 13, 1984 (age 42); Fort Hood, Texas, U.S.
- Listed height: 5 ft 11 in (1.80 m)
- Listed weight: 175 lb (79 kg)

Career information
- High school: Santa Monica (Santa Monica, California)
- University: San Diego State (2002–2006)

Career history
- 2007: Baltimore Ravens*
- 2008: Los Angeles Avengers
- 2009: New York Sentinels
- 2010: Omaha Nighthawks*
- 2010–2011: Sacramento Mountain Lions
- 2012–2015: Saskatchewan Roughriders
- * Offseason or practice squad member only

Awards and highlights
- Grey Cup champion (2013)
- Stats at CFL.ca

Samuel Terrell Maze (born March 13, 1984) is an American former professional football cornerback. He was signed by the Baltimore Ravens as an undrafted free agent in 2007. He played college football at San Diego State.

Maze was also a member of the Los Angeles Avengers, New York Sentinels, Omaha Nighthawks, Sacramento Mountain Lions and Saskatchewan Roughriders.

== Early life ==
Maze attended and played high school football at Santa Monica High School in Santa Monica, California. Maze was a 2001 All-CIF selection at cornerback as a senior at Santa Monica High School. He also saw some time on offense for the Vikings, catching seven touchdown passes, and also returned two kickoffs for scores while helping the Vikings to a CIF championship during his high school career.

== College career ==
Maze played college football at San Diego State from 2002 to 2006, recording 136 tackles, four interceptions and 20 pass breakups in 42 games.

== Professional career ==
=== Baltimore Ravens ===
After going undrafted in the 2007 NFL draft, Maze signed with the Baltimore Ravens as an undrafted free agent. He was waived prior to the regular season.

=== Los Angeles Avengers ===
Maze signed with the Los Angeles Avengers of the Arena Football League in October 2007 and played with the team during the 2008 season. He recorded 83 tackles, two interceptions, 13 pass breakups, a forced fumble, two fumble recoveries and one touchdown during his rookie season.

Maze was released from his contract when the AFL folded in 2009.

=== New York Sentinels ===
Maze was drafted by the New York Sentinels of the United Football League in the UFL Premiere Season Draft. He signed with the team on August 5, 2009.

=== Saskatchewan Roughriders ===
Terrell Maze signed with the Saskatchewan Roughriders of the Canadian Football League. Through his first three seasons in the CFL Maze accumulated 106 tackles, a quarterback sack, two interceptions and one fumble recovery. Following the 2014 CFL season Maze signed a contract extension to stay with the Riders.
