= UFL premiere season draft =

The UFL "premiere" season draft was the inaugural draft of the United Football League (UFL). The results of the draft were announced via press release on June 19, 2009.

Among the players selected were those that participated in earlier workouts in Orlando, Florida and Las Vegas, Nevada. Once drafted by a UFL team, a player's rights were held by that team if he agreed to play within the league.

== Draft results ==
= Indicated player signed with drafting team

=== California Redwoods ===
Player	Position	College
Odie Armstrong	FB	NW Oklahoma State
Obafemi Ayanbadejo	FB	San Diego State
Shane Boyd	QB	Kentucky
Larry Brackins	WR	Pearl River CC
Kai Brown	LS	Brown
Brett Dietz	QB	Hanover
Marcus Fitzgerald	WR	Marshall
Marquies Gunn	DE	Auburn
Derrell Hutsona	RB	Washington State
Prince Kwateng	LB	Northwestern
Branden Ledbetter	TE	Western Michigan
Cory Lekkerkerker	T	California-Davis
Joe Martin	LB	San Diego State
Liam O'Hagan	QB	Harvard
Brian Rimpf	T	East Carolina
B. J. Sams	WR	McNeese State
Brian Stamper	T	Vanderbilt
Jason Stewart	NT	Fresno State
Damon Suggs	DE	Georgia Southern
Ahmad Treaudo	DB	Southern
Marviel Underwood	DB	San Diego State
Jeremy Unertl	DB	Wisconsin–La Crosse
John David Washington	RB	Morehouse
Joe West	WR	Texas-El Paso

=== Florida Tuskers ===
Player	Position	College
Fred Bledsoe	NT	Arkansas
Brooks Bollinger	QB	Wisconsin
Ronnie Cruz	FB	Northern State
Mike Doss	DB	Ohio State
Greg Fassitt	DB	Grambling
Chas Gessner	WR	Brown
Keith Heinrich	TE	Sam Houston State
Rien Long	NT	Washington State
Grant Mason	DB	Michigan
Tim McGarigle	LB	Northwestern
Chris Perry	RB	Michigan
Rob Petitti	T	Pittsburgh
Zach Piller	OG	Florida
Eric Powell	DE	Florida State
Anthony Schlegel	LB	Ohio State
Bo Schobel	DE	TCU
Dominique Thompson	WR	William & Mary
DeJuan Tribble	CB	Boston College
Larry Tripplett	NT	Washington
Darius Vinnett	DB	Arkansas
Seth Wand	T	Northwest Missouri State
Jermaine Wiggins	TE	Georgia
Quincy Wilson	RB	West Virginia
T. J. Wright	DB	Ohio

=== Las Vegas Locomotives ===
Player	Position	College
Adam Archuleta	DB	Arizona State
Adrian Awasom	DE	North Texas
Antwon Jones	P	Little Rock
Jason Boone	OG	Utah
Wendell Bryant	NT	Wisconsin
Ezra Butler	LB	Nevada
Wale Dada	DB	Washington State
George Gause	T	South Carolina
Paul Gause	DB	Seton Hall
Andrew Jacas	K	Fort Valley State
Nate Jackson	TE	Menlo
Brandon Joyce	T	Illinois State
David Kircus	WR	Grand Valley State
Scott Kuhn	TE	Louisville
Gabe Long	NT	Utah
Brandon Moore	LB	Oklahoma
Ronnie Palmer	LB	Arizona
Gary Stills	LB	West Virginia
Tyson Thompson	RB	San Jose State
Andrae Thurman	WR	Southern Oregon
Brian Toal	LB	Boston College
Nick Turnbull	DB	Florida International
Chaz Williams	DB	Oregon
Terrence Whitehead	RB	Oregon

=== New York Sentinels ===
Player	Position	College
C. J. Bachér	QB	Northwestern
Trey Brown	DB	UCLA
Oliver Celestin	DB	Texas Southern
Richy Rich	NT	South Florida
Maurice Fountain	DE	Clemson
Ronnie Ghent	TE	Louisville
Tyronne Gross	RB	Eastern Oregon
Samuel Gutekunst	T	None
Jasper Harvey	C	San Diego State
Brian Johnson	QB	Utah
Noriaki Kinoshita	WR	Ritsumeikan
David Lofton	DB	Stanford
Marc Magro	LB	West Virginia
Terrell Maze	DB	San Diego State
Ray Norell	T	Buffalo
Ramiro Pruneda	T	Monterrey Tech
Joe Rubin	RB	Portland State
Steve Sanders	WR	Bowling Green
Cecil Sapp	RB	Colorado State
Bryan Save	NT	Colorado State
Michale Spicer	DE	Western Carolina
LaBrandon Toefield	RB	LSU
Nathan Williams	LB	Murray State
Shannon Woods	RB	Texas Tech
