= Nate Bennett (offensive lineman) =

American football player (born 1984)

No. 90, 67
- Position: Guard

Personal information
- Born: January 19, 1984 (age 42); Dallas, Georgia, U.S.
- Listed height: 6 ft 4 in (1.93 m)
- Listed weight: 315 lb (143 kg)

Career information
- College: Clemson
- NFL draft: 2008: undrafted

Career history
- Cleveland Browns (2008)*; Baltimore Ravens (2008)*; Atlanta Falcons (2008)*; New Orleans Saints (2009)*; New York Sentinels (2009); Milwaukee Mustangs (2011)
- * Offseason or practice squad member only

Awards and highlights
- Third-team All-American (2006); First-team All-ACC (2006)

Career AFL statistics
- Receptions: 1
- Receiving yards: 5
- Stats at ArenaFan.com

Nathan Bennett (born January 19, 1984) is an American former professional football player who was a guard. He played college football for the Clemson Tigers and was signed by the Cleveland Browns of the National Football League (NFL) as an undrafted free agent in 2008.

Bennett was also a member of the Baltimore Ravens, Atlanta Falcons, New Orleans Saints, Hartford Colonials and Milwaukee Mustangs.
