= Paul Pratt (American football) =

American football player (born 1985)

No. 36, 37
- Position: Cornerback

Personal information
- Born: May 1, 1985 (age 41); Woodland Hills, California, U.S.
- Listed height: 5 ft 10 in (1.78 m)
- Listed weight: 185 lb (84 kg)

Career information
- High school: William Howard Taft (Woodland Hills)
- College: Nevada
- NFL draft: 2008: undrafted

Career history
- New York Sentinels (2009); Detroit Lions (2009–2010)
- Stats at Pro Football Reference

Paul Pratt (born May 1, 1985) is an American former professional football player who was a cornerback for the Detroit Lions of the National Football League (NFL). He played college football for the Nevada Wolf Pack. He was signed by the New York Sentinels as a street free agent in 2009.
