= Samuel Gutekunst =

German gridiron football player (born 1984)

No. 66, 60
- Position: Offensive tackle

Personal information
- Born: May 20, 1984 (age 42); Karlsruhe, West Germany
- Listed height: 6 ft 6 in (1.98 m)
- Listed weight: 317 lb (144 kg)

Career information
- College: None

Career history
- Saarland Hurricanes (2002–2005)*; Frankfurt Galaxy (2005–2006); Baltimore Ravens (2006)*; Berlin Thunder (2007); Jacksonville Jaguars (2007)*; Seattle Seahawks (2008)*
- * Offseason or practice squad member only

Awards and highlights
- World Bowl champion (XIV)

Samuel Gutekunst (born May 20, 1984) is a German former American football offensive tackle.

Gutekunst was also a member of the Frankfurt Galaxy, Berlin Thunder, Baltimore Ravens, Jacksonville Jaguars and Seattle Seahawks.

Gutekunst started his career with the Heiligenstein Crusaders in Heiligenstein, Germany. After being scouted for the Rheinland Pfalz / Saarland junior all-star team, he transferred to the Saarland Hurricanes where he played for the GFL-juniors in 2003 and subsequently for the seniors in the GFL throughout the 2005 season. While being involved with the Hurricanes, Gutekunst was an offensive line coach for the Rheinland Pfalz / Saarland all-star team 2004-05 as well as for the Heiligenstein Crusaders during the 2004 season.

Gutekunst was assigned twice to the Frankfurt Galaxy as a National Player in 2005 and 2006, starting two games during his first and five in his second season, where he won World Bowl XIV against the Amsterdam Admirals at LTU Arena in Düsseldorf.

Because of his efforts, he advanced to the NFL through the International Practice Squad Program with the Baltimore Ravens in 2006. That year, the Ravens made the playoffs as AFC North champions. By losing the divisional playoffs to the Indianapolis Colts (15-6), the Ravens were only two games short of competing in Super Bowl XLI. The Ravens ended the season with an overall record of 13–4.

After returning to NFL Europe, Gutekunst was assigned to the Berlin Thunder where he started eight games of the 2007 season, missing two with ruptures in his right foot. Following the 2007 season, NFL Europe was shut down.

As a part of the developmental program, Gutekunst went back to the NFL with the Jacksonville Jaguars where he spent the 2007 season going to the playoffs for the second time as a part of the Jaguars practice squad.

As a free agent, Gutekunst was assigned to the Seattle Seahawks in 2008 but missed training camp and the 2008 season after sustaining an injury to his lower back. He was drafted in the UFL Premiere Season Draft in 2009 by the New York Sentinels, but was unable to attend because of his back injury.

Gutekunst now works for SAP in Germany.
