= Maurice Fountain =

American football player (born 1982)

No. 78, 99, 92
- Position: Defensive end

Personal information
- Born: September 22, 1982 (age 44); Camden, South Carolina, U.S.
- Listed height: 6 ft 3 in (1.91 m)
- Listed weight: 268 lb (122 kg)

Career information
- High school: Camden
- College: Clemson
- NFL draft: 2005: undrafted

Career history
- Manchester Wolves (2007); Utah Blaze (2008); Miami Dolphins (2008)*; New York Sentinals/Hartford Colonials (2009–2010); Seattle Seahawks (2010–2011)*; Philadelphia Eagles (2011–2012)*; Pittsburgh Power (2014)
- * Offseason or practice squad member only

Awards and highlights
- UFL champion (2011); AFL All-Rookie Team (2008)

Career AFL statistics
- Total tackles: 15
- Sacks: 5.5
- Forced fumbles: 1
- Stats at ArenaFan.com
- Stats at Pro Football Reference

Gregory Maurice Fountain (born September 22, 1982) is an American former football defensive tackle. He was first signed by the Manchester Wolves of AF2 as a free agent in 2007. He played college football at Clemson.

Fountain was also a member of the Utah Blaze, Miami Dolphins, Hartford Colonials, Las Vegas Locomotives, Seattle Seahawks, Philadelphia Eagles, and Pittsburgh Power.

== Early life ==
As a senior at Camden High School in South Carolina in 1999, Fountain was a starter on the defensive line and as tight end. Fountain, whom friends refer to as "Moe," was a two-time All-Region player for the Bulldogs. He was a key cog on a stingy Bulldogs defense that held opposing offenses to 8.4 points per game in 1999.

The Bulldogs finished with double-digit wins (10–2) for the first time since the 1990 state championship team while earning a share of the Region IV-AAA title. Following the season, Fountain received an invitation to play in the North-South All-Star Game in Myrtle Beach, South Carolina) where he was named MVP.

== College career ==
Fountain continued to hone his skills at Fork Union Military Academy, earning the Defensive MVP award following the 2000 season before signing with Clemson University (2001–04). While with the Tigers, Fountain earned the Defensive 12th-Man Award along with the Most Improved Defensive End in the Weight Room Award. As a testament to his endurance, Fountain, who played in three bowl games including the win over No. 6 Tennessee in the 2004 Peach Bowl, became the second Tiger in school history to play in 50 games during his career.

== Professional career ==
After going undrafted by the NFL in 2005, Fountain took some time off from football before resurfacing in the AF2 League, where he had a breakout rookie season with the Manchester Wolves in 2007. During that season, Fountain set a franchise record with 13 sacks and earned several team and league honors before being signed by the Utah Blaze during the AFL free agency period. Fountain finished second on the Blaze in sacks and was named to the AF1 All-Rookie Team in his only season in 2008. Fountain was signed by the Miami Dolphins during 2008 NFL training camps but was released during the final cuts prior to the start of the regular season.

Fountain continued to play professionally in the United Football League (UFL) with the Hartford Colonials. Formerly the New York Sentinels, the team drafted Fountain with their fifth pick in the 2009 "Premiere" Season Draft.

On August 20, 2011, Fountain re-signed with the Seattle Seahawks. He was released on September 3, 2011, re-signed to the Seahawks' practice squad the following day, and then was released from the practice squad on September 6, 2011.

The Philadelphia Eagles signed Fountain to their practice squad on November 22, 2011. At the conclusion of the 2011 season, his practice squad contract expired and he became a free agent. He was re-signed to the active roster on January 2, 2012.
