= Pratt & Whitney Stadium at Rentschler Field =

Football stadium in East Hartford, Connecticut

Pratt & Whitney Stadium
- Rentschler Field, The Rent

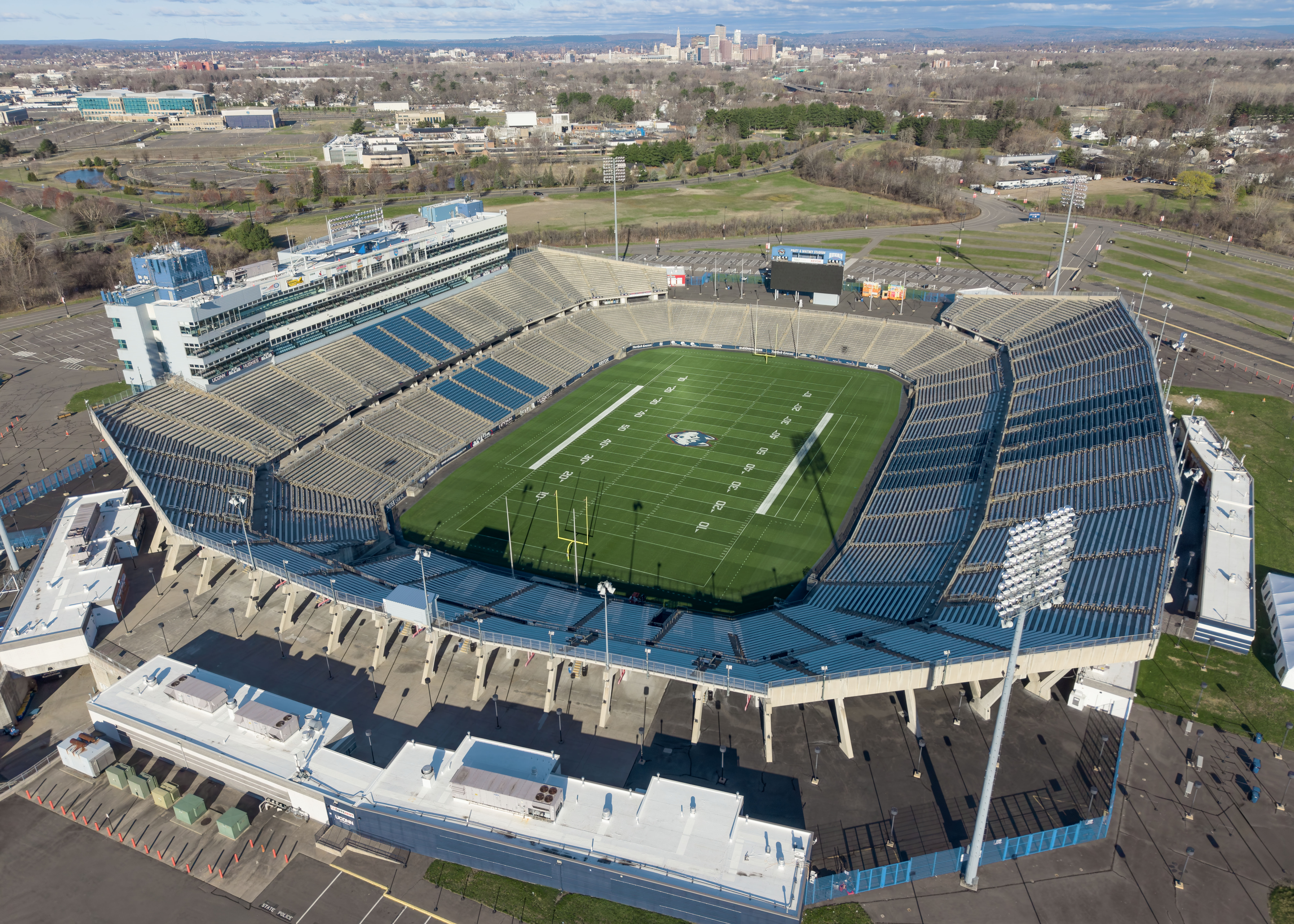
- The stadium in 2026

- Location in Connecticut Location in the United States
- Former names: Rentschler Field (2003–2015)
- Location: 615 Silver Lane, East Hartford, CT 06118
- Coordinates: 41°45′35″N 72°37′8″W
- Owner: State of Connecticut
- Operator: Spectra
- Capacity: 38,066 (standing room to 40,000, expandable to at least 41,000)
- Surface: Kentucky Bluegrass
- Record attendance: 42,704 (Sept. 2013)
- Public transit: 120, 121

Construction
- Groundbreaking: October 21, 2000
- Opened: August 30, 2003; 23 years ago
- Cost: $91.2 million ($160 million in 2025 dollars)
- Architect: Ellerbe Becket
- Structural engineer: BVH Integrated Services
- Services engineer: Diversified Technology Consultants
- General contractor: Hunt-Gilbane Joint Venture

Tenants
- UConn Huskies (NCAA) (2003–present); Hartford Colonials (UFL) (2010); Hartford Athletic (USLC) (2019); Toronto FC (MLS) (2020)

Website
- rentschlerfield.com

Pratt & Whitney Stadium at Rentschler Field is a stadium in East Hartford, Connecticut. It is primarily used for football and soccer, and is the home field of the University of Connecticut Huskies (UConn). In 2010, it was home to the Hartford Colonials of the United Football League. The stadium, which opened in 2003, was the first stadium used primarily by an NCAA FBS (formerly Division I-A) team to open in the 21st century. Prior to its opening, Connecticut had played on-campus at Memorial Stadium in Storrs from 1953 to 2002.

Rentschler Field was originally the name of the company airfield for Pratt & Whitney that formerly occupied the site. The airfield, which began operations in 1931, was named after Frederick Rentschler, who founded Pratt & Whitney in 1925 and also founded its parent company, United Technologies. It was originally used for test flights and maintenance operations, and later for corporate aviation. The 75-acre (30 ha) site was decommissioned as an airport in the 1990s, and donated to the state of Connecticut by United Technologies in 1999. A subsequent 65-acre donation by United Technologies in 2009 allowed for the construction of additional grass parking lots adjacent to the Stadium.

Pursuant to a lease agreement with the State, UConn plays all its home football games at Rentschler Field.

== History ==
The New England Patriots considered moving to Connecticut and sharing a stadium with the UConn football team in the mid-1990s. The new stadium was supposed to be built on the Connecticut Convention Center site in Downtown Hartford. However, when the Patriots completed the deal for Gillette Stadium in Foxboro, Massachusetts, the Hartford stadium plan was scaled down and the location was moved to East Hartford. The current capacity of 40,000 can expand to 50,000 with limited rehabilitation and has the layout and design for expansion of up to 60,000 seats in the future.

The stadium is owned by the State of Connecticut, Office of Policy and Management, while operations are overseen by the quasi-public Capital Region Development Authority (CRDA). Global Spectrum, L.P. has managed the building on behalf of CRDA since 2013. Previously, the Stadium was managed by Bushnell Management Services (2011–2013), Anschutz Entertainment Group (AEG)(2007–2011) and Madison Square Garden L.P. (2003–2007).

Prior to the 2013 season, a new 28×73-foot wide and 15HD pixel video display was installed replacing the stadium's original scoreboard.

On July 16, 2015, it was announced that the stadium had been named Pratt & Whitney Stadium in a deal between Pratt & Whitney and UConn. The playing surface is still named Rentschler Field. In return, Pratt and Whitney donated additional land that will be used for game day parking.

== Connecticut Huskies ==
The UConn Huskies football team has an all time 80–60 record at Rentschler Field.

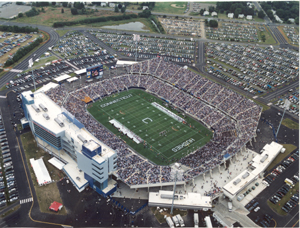
Aerial view during a game in 2006

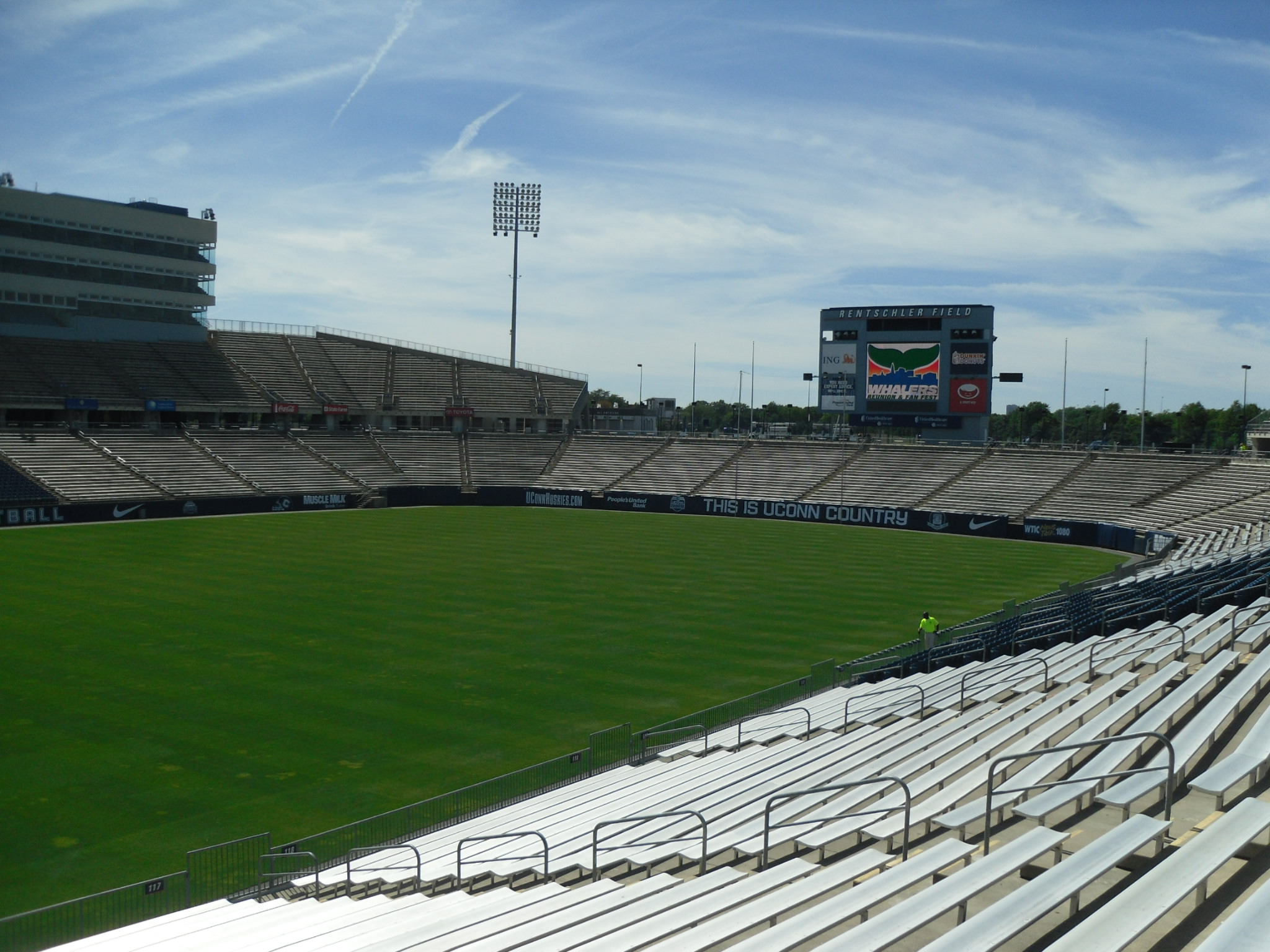
An interior view of Rentschler Field

Year	Record
2003	5–1
2004	6–1
2005	4–2
2006	3–4
2007	7–0
2008	4–2
2009	4–2
2010	6–0
2011	4–3
2012	3–3
2013	2–5
2014	2–5
2015	4–2
2016	3–4
2017	2–4
2018	1–5
2019	1–5
2021	1–5
2022	5–1
2023	1–5
2024	6–1
2025	6–0

=== Sellouts ===
Date	Opponent	Result	Seats
September 13, 2003	Boston College	L 14–24	40,000
November 8, 2003	Rutgers	W 38–31	40,000
September 11, 2004	Duke	W 22–20	40,000
September 25, 2004	Army	W 40–3	40,000
September 30, 2004	Pittsburgh	W 29–17	40,000
October 13, 2004	#17 West Virginia	L 19–31	40,000
October 23, 2004	Temple	W 45–31	40,000
November 20, 2004	Buffalo	W 29–0	40,000
September 1, 2005	Buffalo	W 38–0	40,000
September 10, 2005	Liberty	W 59–0	40,000
October 7, 2005	Syracuse	W 26–7	40,000
October 22, 2005	Rutgers	L 24–26	40,000
November 26, 2005	South Florida	W 15–10	40,000
December 3, 2005	#16 Louisville	L 20–30	40,000
September 16, 2006	Wake Forest	L 13–24	40,000
September 30, 2006	Navy	L 17–41	40,000
October 20, 2006	#4 West Virginia	L 11–37	40,000
November 11, 2006	Pittsburgh	W 46–45^{3OT}	40,000
October 19, 2007	Louisville	W 21–17	40,000
October 27, 2007	#11 South Florida	W 22–15	40,000
November 3, 2007	Rutgers	W 38–19	40,000
November 17, 2007	Syracuse	W 30–7	40,000
September 13, 2008	Virginia	W 45–10	40,000
October 25, 2008	Cincinnati	W 40–16	40,000
November 1, 2008	West Virginia	L 35–13	40,000
October 17, 2009	Louisville	W 38–25	40,000
November 28, 2009	Syracuse	W 56–31	40,000
October 2, 2010	Vanderbilt	W 40–21	40,000
October 29, 2010	West Virginia	W 16–13^{OT}	40,000
November 27, 2010	Cincinnati	W 38–17	40,000
September 21, 2013	#15 Michigan	L 24–21	42,704

== Soccer ==
=== Hartford Athletic ===
On March 11, 2019, it was announced that the renovations at Dillon Stadium would not be completed on time for Hartford Athletic's home opener on May 4 against Charlotte Independence. Hartford Athletic played seven games at Pratt & Whitney Stadium.

Date	Opponent	Score	Attendance
May 4, 2019	(United States) Charlotte Independence	1–1	11,346
May 10, 2019	(United States) Memphis 901	1–2	5,045
May 25, 2019	(Canada) Ottawa Fury	1–1	5,346
June 1, 2019	(United States) North Carolina	1–1	5,003
June 8, 2019	(United States) Saint Louis	2–1	5,132
June 16, 2019	(United States) Nashville	2–3	4,489
June 29, 2019	(United States) Bethlehem Steel	0–3	5,012

=== Major League Soccer ===
On September 23, 2017, New York City FC played a home match at Pratt & Whitney Stadium, against the Houston Dynamo, in the stadium's first Major League Soccer game. The game was relocated from Yankee Stadium in New York City due to a schedule conflict with the New York Yankees.

On September 11, 2020, Governor Ned Lamont announced that Toronto FC would finish their season's home matches at Pratt & Whitney Stadium due to travel restrictions during the COVID-19 pandemic.

Date	Teams	Score	Opponent	Competition	Attendance
September 23, 2017	New York City (United States)	1–1	(United States) Houston Dynamo	MLS	10,165
September 27, 2020	Toronto (Canada)	3–1	(United States) Columbus Crew	MLS Trillium Cup	–
October 3, 2020	Toronto (Canada)	2–1	(United States) Philadelphia Union	MLS	–
October 14, 2020	Toronto (Canada)	1–1	(United States) New York Red Bulls	MLS	–
October 18, 2020	Toronto (Canada)	1–0	(United States) Atlanta United	MLS	–
October 28, 2020	Toronto (Canada)	0–1	(United States) New York City	MLS	–
November 1, 2020	Toronto (Canada)	2–1	(United States) Inter Miami	MLS	1,394
November 24, 2020	Toronto (Canada)	0–1	(United States) Nashville	MLS Cup Playoff	–

=== United States men's national soccer team ===
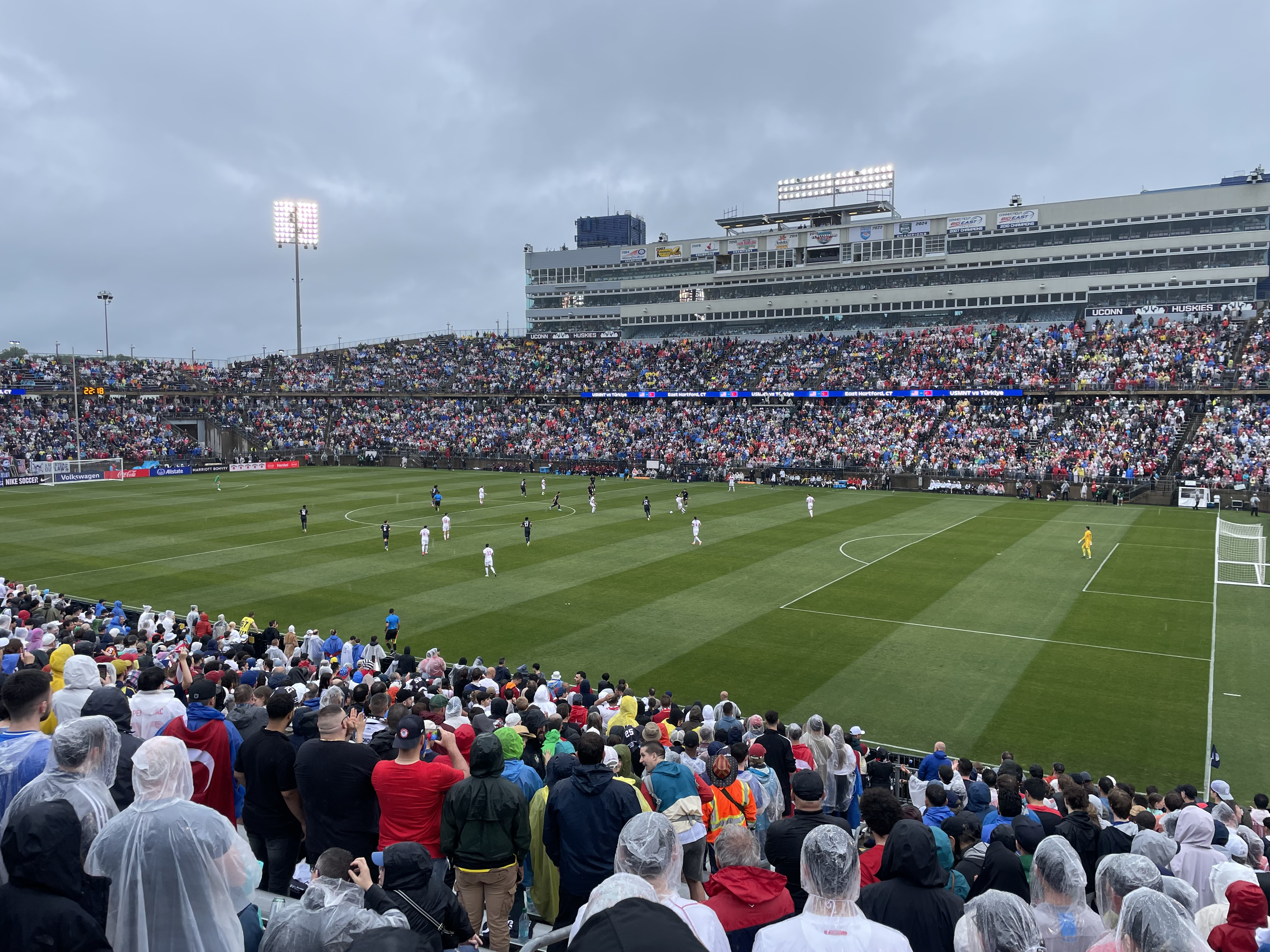
The stadium in 2025 during United States vs. Turkey

Rentschler Field has hosted several United States men's national soccer team's home games, including Landon Donovan's last game for the National Team on October 10, 2014.

Date	Opponent	Score	Competition	Attendance
August 17, 2005	Trinidad and Tobago	1–0	2006 FIFA World Cup qualification CONCACAF fourth round	25,488
May 30, 2006	Latvia	1–0	Friendly	22,455
May 25, 2010	Czech Republic	2–4	Friendly	36,000
July 16, 2013	Costa Rica	1–0	2013 CONCACAF Gold Cup	25,432
October 10, 2014	Ecuador	1–1	Friendly	36,265
July 1, 2017	Ghana	2–1	Friendly	28,754
October 16, 2018	Peru	1–1	Friendly	24,959
October 14, 2023	Germany	1–3	Friendly	37,743
June 7, 2025	Turkey	1–2	Friendly	34,023

=== United States women's national soccer team ===
Rentschler Field has also hosted several United States women's national soccer team's home games.

Date	Opponent	Score	Competition	Attendance
August 1, 2004	China	3–1	Friendly	15,093
July 14, 2007	Norway	1–0	Friendly	9,957
July 17, 2010	Sweden	3–0	Friendly	5,570
October 23, 2012	Germany	2–2	Friendly	18,870
June 19, 2014	France	2–2	Friendly	14,695
April 6, 2016	Colombia	7–0	Friendly	21,792
July 29, 2018	Australia	1–1	2018 Tournament of Nations	21,570
July 1, 2021	Mexico	4–0	Friendly	21,637
July 5, 2021	Mexico	4–0	Friendly	27,758
October 26, 2025	Portugal	3–1	Friendly	26,492

=== Other soccer matches ===
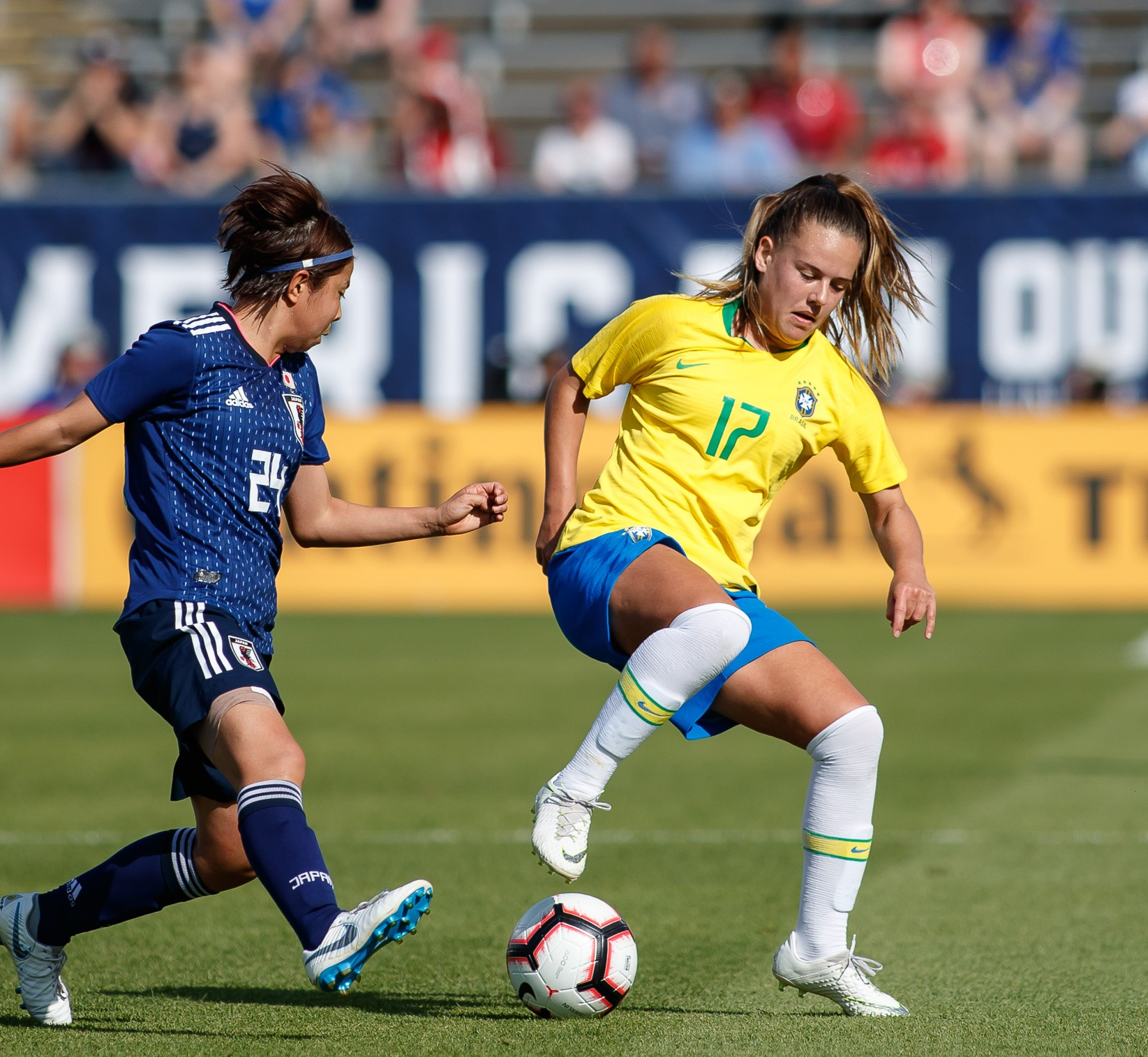
Japan v Brazil women's soccer match, 2018

Date	Winner	Score	Opponent	Competition	Attendance
July 27, 2004	Liverpool (England)	5–1	(Scotland) Celtic	Champions World Soccer Series Two 2004	24,271
July 16, 2013	Cuba	4–0	Belize	2013 CONCACAF Gold Cup	25,432
July 29, 2018	Brazil	2–1	Japan	2018 Tournament of Nations	13,027
March 8, 2022	New York City (United States)	3–1	(Guatemala) Comunicaciones	2022 CONCACAF Champions League	15,642
June 18, 2023	Venezuela	1–0	Guatemala	International Friendly	8,568
June 15, 2024	Colombia	3–0	Bolivia	International Friendly	
June 16, 2024	Ecuador	2–1	Honduras	International Friendly	15,000
October 26, 2025	United States Men's Deaf Team	3–1	Germany Men's Deaf Team	International Friendly	TBD
June 6, 2026	Cape Verde	3–0	Bermuda	International Friendly	

== Hartford Colonials ==
The Hartford Colonials were a United Football League team that played their home games at Rentschler Field. During their (2010 UFL season), the Colonials played all four home games at Rentschler, after having played one there the previous season while they were known as the New York Sentinels. Attendance at Colonials games averaged a consistent 15,000 people, third place in the five-team league behind Omaha and Sacramento. The UFL suspended the Colonials franchise in 2011 and the franchise was officially terminated when the team's former owner (Bill Mayer) was named as the new owner of the Virginia Destroyers.

Date	Opponent	Result	Score	Attendance
Thursday, November 12, 2009	Florida Tuskers	L	6–24	5,201
Saturday, September 18, 2010	Sacramento Mountain Lions	W	27–10	14,384
Saturday, October 9, 2010	Florida Tuskers	L	20–33	14,468
Saturday, October 16, 2010	Omaha Nighthawks	L	14–19	14,056
Saturday, November 20, 2010	Las Vegas Locomotives	W	27–14	14,554

== Lacrosse ==
On May 19, 2019, Rentschler Field hosted the Quarterfinals for the 2019 NCAA Men's Lacrosse Championship. In 2021 and 2022, Rentschler Field hosted the NCAA Men's Lacrosse Championship for Divisions I, II, and III.

Date	Tournament	Result	Spectators
April 24, 2010	2010 ESPNU Warrior Classic	Denver 9–8 Fairfield	6,415
April 24, 2010	2010 ESPNU Warrior Classic	Georgetown 12–13 UMass	6,415
May 19, 2019	2019 NCAA Division I Men's Quarterfinals	Penn State 21–14 Loyola	8,568
May 19, 2019	2019 NCAA Division I Men's Quarterfinals	Yale 19–18 (OT) Penn	8,568
May 29, 2021	2021 NCAA Division I Men's Semifinals	North Carolina 11–12 Virginia	13,707
May 29, 2021	2021 NCAA Division I Men's Semifinals	Maryland 14–5 Duke	13,707
May 30, 2021	2021 NCAA Division III Men's Finals	RIT 15–14 (2OT) Salisbury	5,815
May 30, 2021	2021 NCAA Division II Men's Finals	Le Moyne 12–6 Lenoir–Rhyne	5,815
May 31, 2021	2021 NCAA Division I Men's Finals	Virginia 17–16 Maryland	14,816
May 28, 2022	2022 NCAA Division I Men's Semifinals	Cornell 17–10 Rutgers	21,688
May 28, 2022	2022 NCAA Division I Men's Semifinals	Maryland 13–8 Princeton	21,688
May 29, 2022	2022 NCAA Division III Men's Finals	Union 10–12 RIT	14,650
May 29, 2022	2022 NCAA Division II Men's Finals	Mercy 7–11 Tampa	14,650
May 30, 2022	2022 NCAA Division I Men's Finals	Maryland 9–7 Cornell	22,184

== Rugby union ==
On June 4, 2005, Rentschler Field hosted two rugby union matches; Wales vs USA Rugby and the 2005 U.S. Rugby Super League Championship game, between New York Athletic Club Rugby Football Club and Belmont Shore RFC in front of 8,027. Wales would defeat the US 77–3 and NYAC would defeat Belmont Shore 23–19. In 2008 Rentschler Field hosted a match between Irish provincial side Munster and the USA Eagles, with Munster winning 46–22.

Date	Winner	Score	Opponent	League	Competition	Attendance
June 4, 2005	Wales	77–3	United States	IRB	2005 Wales rugby union tour of North America	8,027
June 4, 2005	NYAC (New York (state))	23–19	(California) Belmont Shore	USRSL	Championship	8,027
August 31, 2008	Munster	46–22	United States	IRB	2008 Setanta Challenge Cup	8,350

== Whalers Hockey Fest ==
On August 24, 2010, a fan event, called Whalers Fan Fest, occurred, featuring many of the former players, draws were close to 5,000 people on a Saturday afternoon.

From February 11 to the 20th, 2011, the stadium hosted the Whalers Hockey Fest 2011. A hockey rink was constructed on the field much like is done for the annual NHL Winter Classic. Events included a Hartford Whalers Alumni vs. Boston Bruins Alumni game, with an appearance from the Hanson Brothers, from the film Slap Shot, a double-header featuring both UConn men's and women's hockey teams, a Hockey Legends team faced off against the Mystery, Alaska Hollywood team, along with the Hanson Brothers from the movie Slap Shot, and the second edition of the American Hockey League Outdoor Classic between the host Connecticut Whale and the Providence Bruins. Over 15,000 fans came out to watch the so-called "Whale Bowl", while over 1,700 attended the UConn men's game.

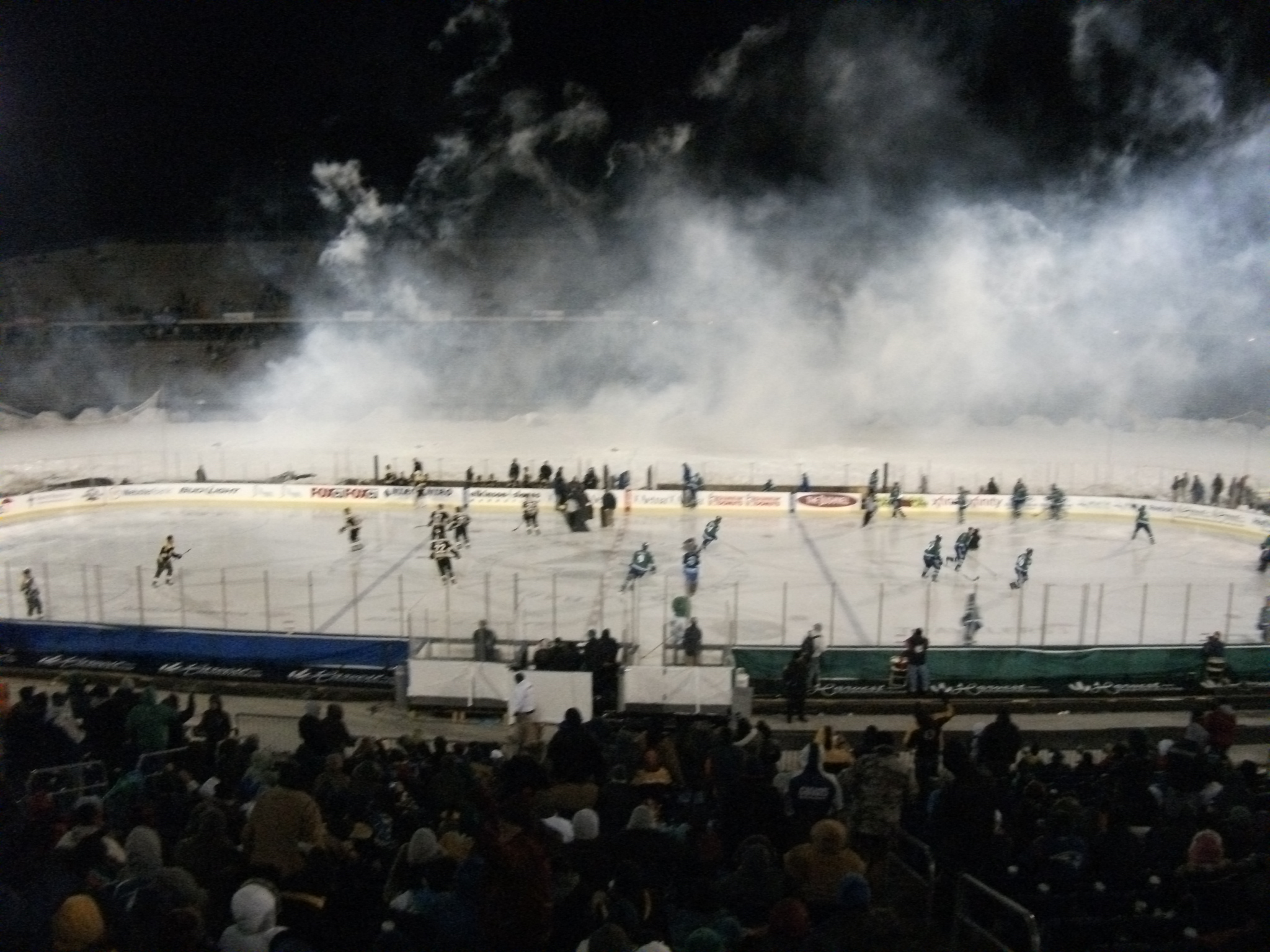
"Whale Bowl" at Rentschler Field, 19 Feb 2011

Date	League	Away team	Home team	Score	Attendance
February 13, 2011	Atlantic Hockey	Sacred Heart Pioneers (M)	UConn Huskies (M)	3–1	1,911
February 13, 2011	Hockey East	Providence Friars (W)	UConn Huskies (W)	4–3	153
February 15, 2011	NESCAC	Wesleyan Cardinals (W)	Trinity Bantams (W)	5–1	100
February 15, 2011	NESCAC	Wesleyan Cardinals (M)	Trinity Bantams (M)	3–1	820
February 19, 2011	Atlantic Hockey	Army Black Knights (M)	AIC Yellow Jackets (M)	4–1	1,142
February 19, 2011	NHL Alumni	Boston Bruins Alumni	Hartford Whalers Alumni	4–4	10,000
February 19, 2011	AHL	Providence Bruins	Connecticut Whale	5–4 (SO)	21,673

== Concerts ==
Date	Artist	Opening act(s)	Tour / Concert name	Attendance	Gross	Notes
September 16, 2003	Bruce Springsteen & The E Street Band		The Rising Tour	51,569	$3,788,325	
September 18, 2003	Bruce Springsteen & The E Street Band		The Rising Tour	66,000	$3,788,325	
August 26, 2005	The Rolling Stones	Maroon 5	A Bigger Bang Tour			
July 31, 2007	The Police	Fiction Plane	The Police Reunion Tour	32,450	$3,318,015	
September 15, 2018	A Will Away		UConn Fan Fest			
May 28, 2022	Kenny Mehler					
August 23, 2025	Chris Brown	Bryson Tiller	Breezy Bowl XX			
June 22, 2026	Post Malone; Jelly Roll; Carter Faith		Big Ass Stadium Tour 2			

== Gallery ==
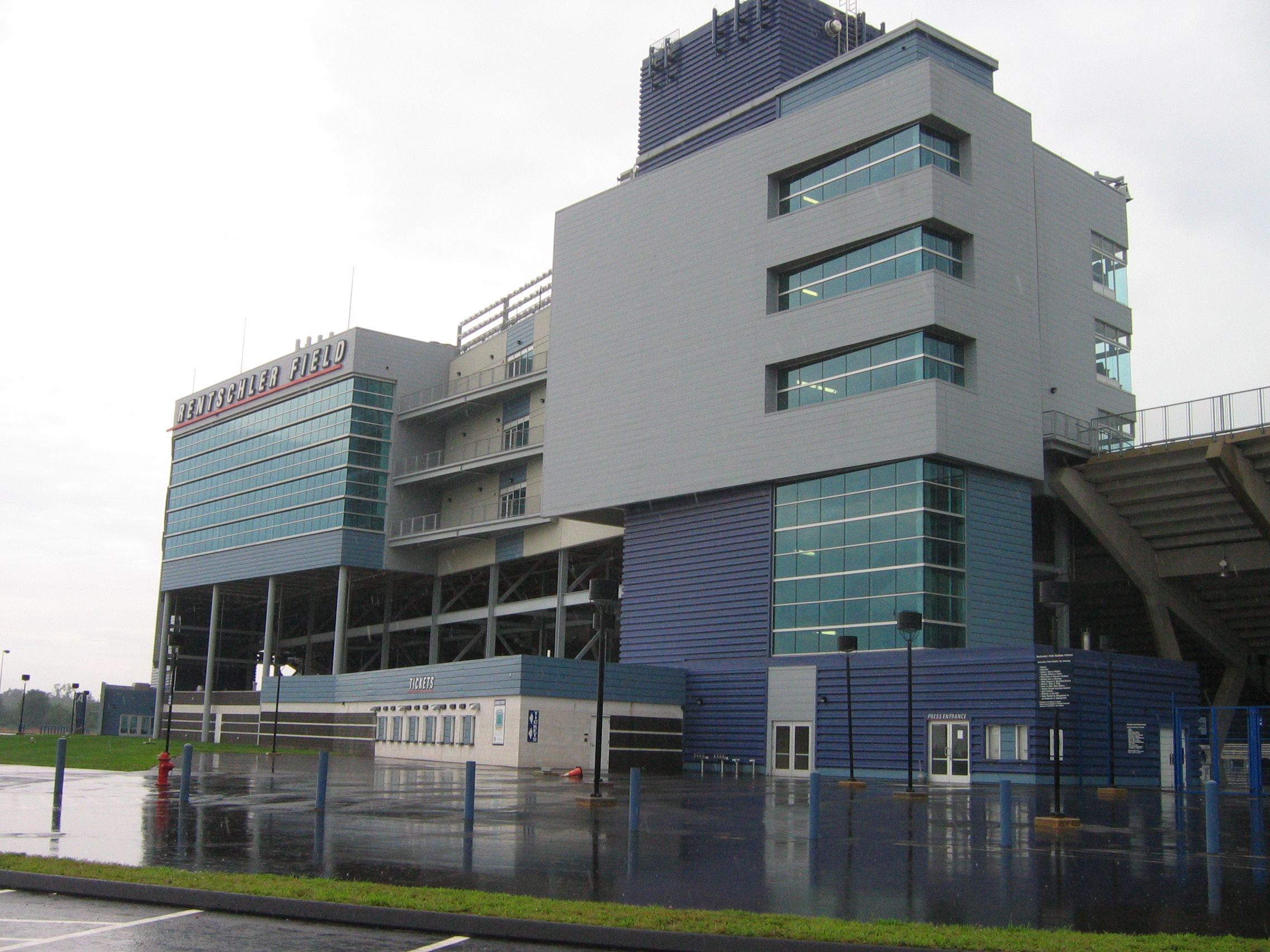
Football facilities, 2008

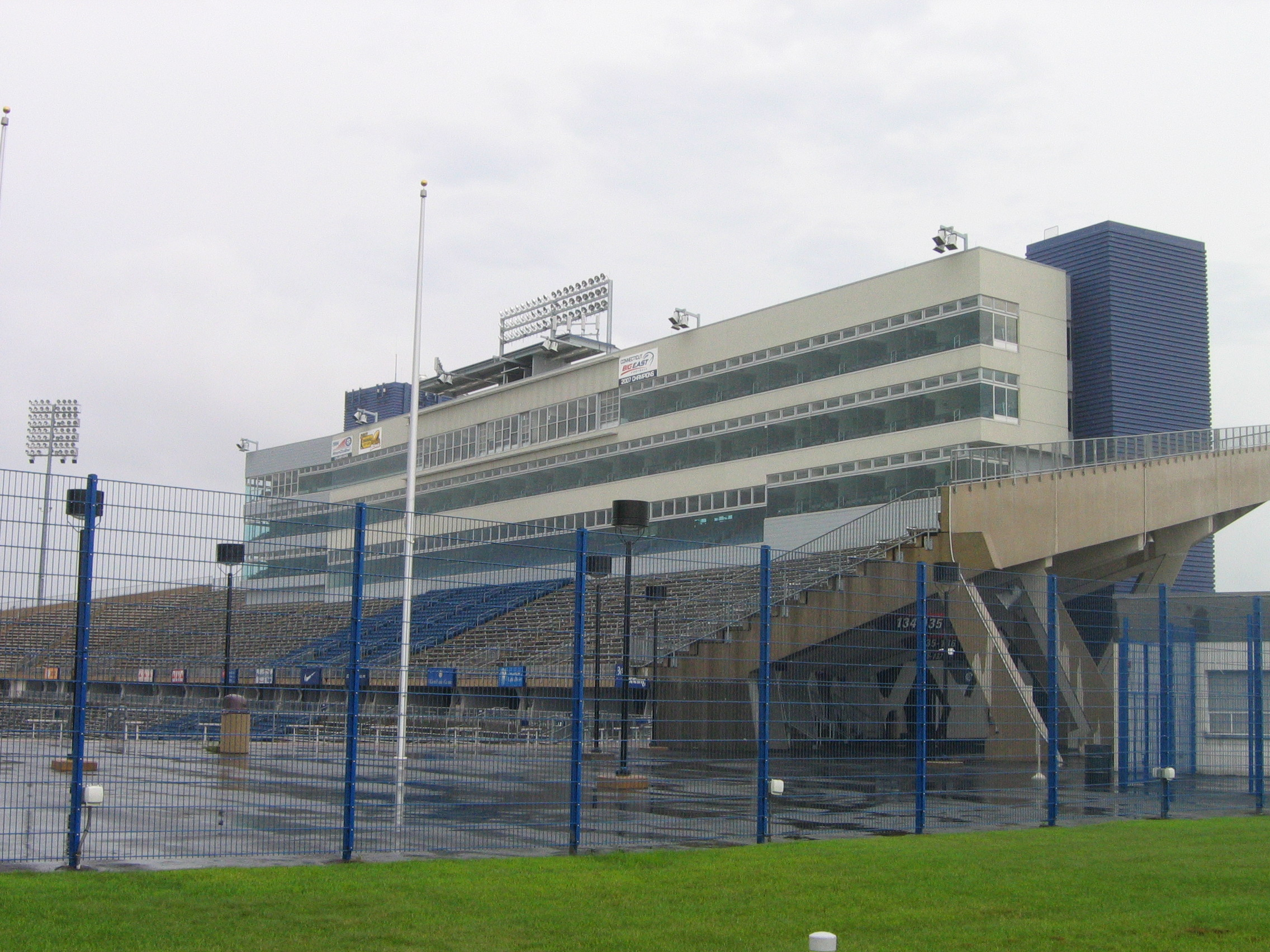
Grandstands and boxes, 2008

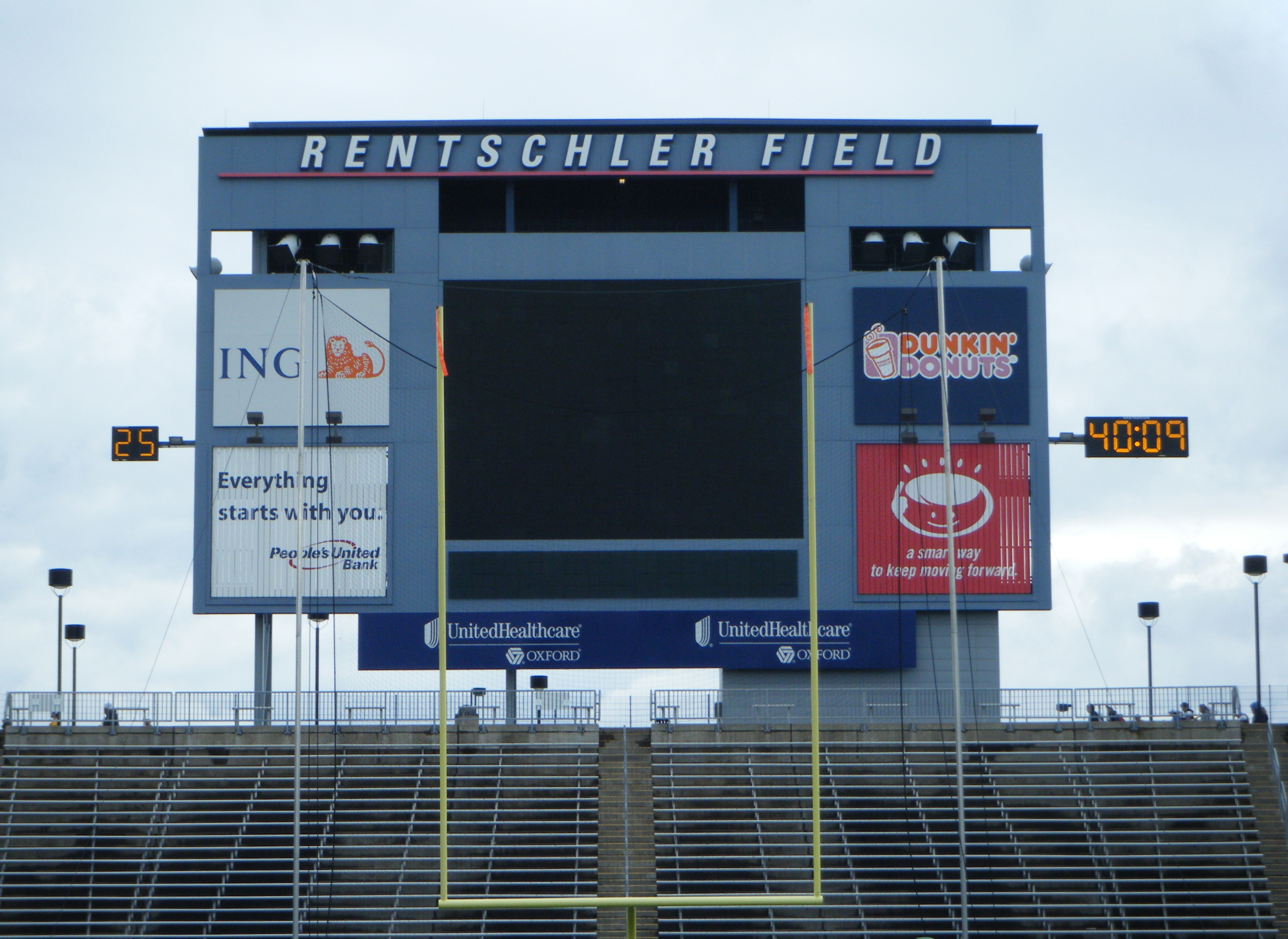
Scoreboard in 2010

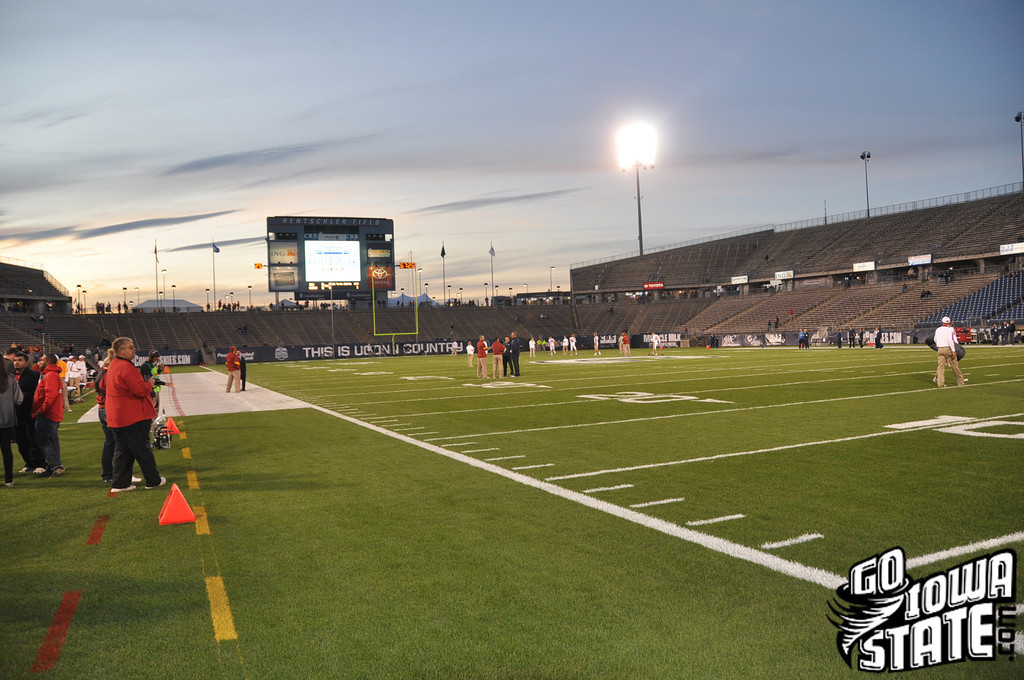
End zone view, 2011

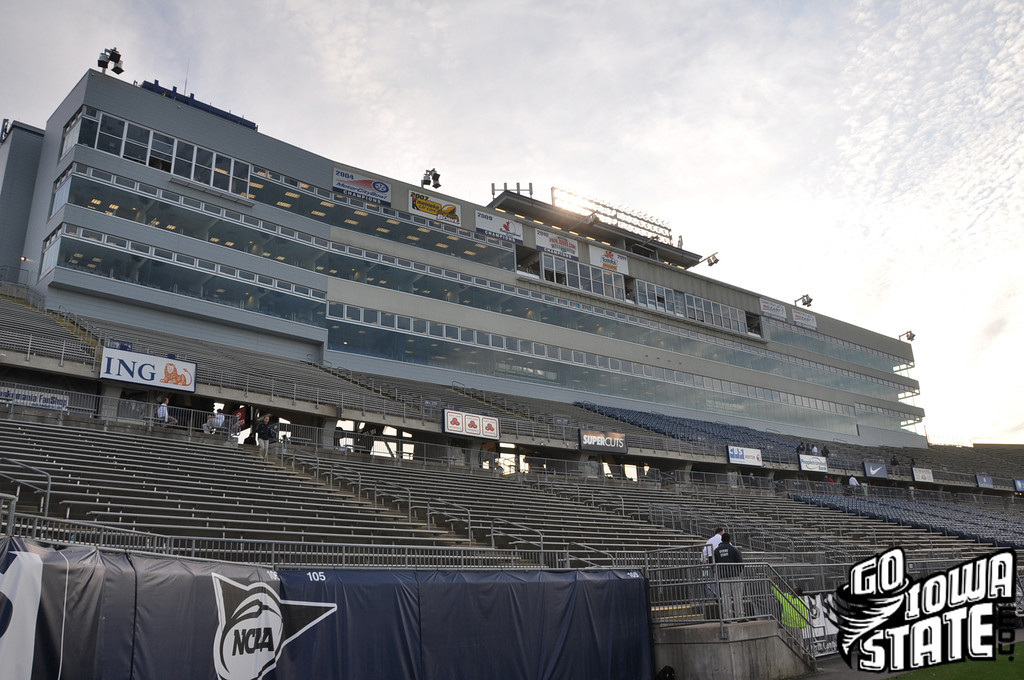
Luxury box, 2011

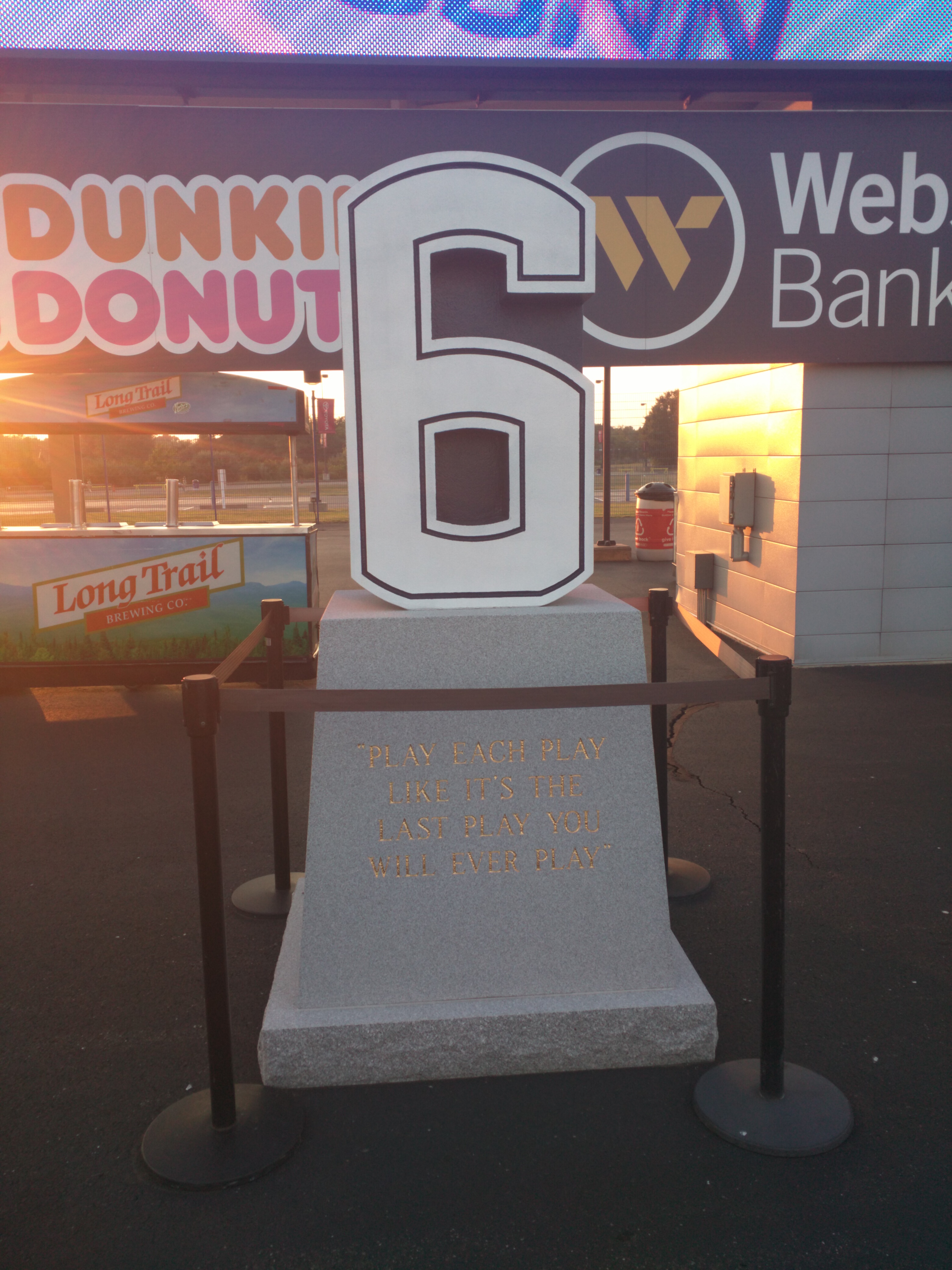
Jasper Howard monument

== See also ==
- List of NCAA Division I FBS football stadiums
