= Nate Bennett =

Nate Bennett may refer to:

- Nate Bennett (offensive lineman) (born 1984), American football player
- Nate Bennett (quarterback) (born 2005), American college football player

== See also ==
- Nathaniel Bennett (1818–1886), American justice of the California Supreme Court
