= Scott Player =

American football player (born 1969)

No. 10, 5
- Position: Punter

Personal information
- Born: December 17, 1969 (age 56); St. Augustine, Florida, U.S.
- Listed height: 6 ft 1 in (1.85 m)
- Listed weight: 211 lb (96 kg)

Career information
- High school: St. Augustine
- College: Florida State (1990–1991)
- NFL draft: 1993: undrafted

Career history
- Birmingham Barracudas (1995); Arizona Cardinals (1996)*; New York Giants (1997)*; New York Jets (1997)*; Arizona Cardinals (1998–2006); Cleveland Browns (2007); New England Patriots (2008)*; New York Sentinels (2009)
- * Offseason or practice squad member only

Awards and highlights
- Pro Bowl (2000)

Career NFL statistics
- Punts: 727
- Punting yards: 31,345
- Average punt: 43.1
- Longest punt: 67
- Stats at Pro Football Reference

Scott Darwin Player (born December 17, 1969) is an American former professional football player who was a punter in the National Football League (NFL), Canadian Football League (CFL), and United Football League (UFL). He also played college football for the Florida State Seminoles and was signed by the Birmingham Barracudas as a street free agent in 1995.

Player was also a member of the New York Giants, New York Jets, Arizona Cardinals, Cleveland Browns, New England Patriots, and New York Sentinels. He was a Pro Bowl alternate with the Cardinals in 1999 and a Pro Bowl selection in 2000.

== Early life ==
After playing college football at Florida State, Player became a physical education teacher at Price Middle School until 1994. Afterwards, he became a teacher at Family Worship Center Academy through 1995, during which he became the punter for the Barracudas. After his brief stint with the now defunct Barracudas, he became the assistant head of fitness for the City of Birmingham, Alabama from March 1996 until October 1997. During his employment in Alabama, he was signed by the Arizona Cardinals, New York Jets and New York Giants but did not make the final roster on any of these teams. After his tenure with the City of Birmingham, he became a dispatcher at Roadway Express from January 1997 through January 1998, after which he was signed back by the Arizona Cardinals, finally making a roster and remaining with the team until the 2007 preseason.

== Professional career ==
He played ten years in the NFL, nine of which were with the Arizona Cardinals and a portion of a season with the Cleveland Browns. He also played in the Canadian Football League and in NFL Europa with the Frankfurt Galaxy. Player was the last NFL player to wear a one-bar face mask, which was banned by the league in 2004. His face mask was covered under a grandfather clause.

=== Arizona Cardinals ===
Player played for the Cardinals between 1998 and 2006, earning a Pro Bowl selection in 2000. The Cardinals released him on August 29, 2007.

=== Cleveland Browns ===
On September 18, 2007, Player was signed by the Cleveland Browns after Dave Zastudil was injured. On October 8, the Browns released Player.

=== New England Patriots ===
On April 18, 2008, Player was signed by the New England Patriots to compete with incumbent Chris Hanson. He was released by New England on June 12.

=== New York Sentinels ===
Player was signed by the New York Sentinels in 2009. UFL rules allowed Player to keep his one-bar face mask during his time with the Sentinels.
