= Michale Spicer =

American football player (born 1982)

Pomona-Pitzer Sagehens
- Title: Special teams coordinator & defensive line coach

Personal information
- Born: June 30, 1982 (age 44); El Paso, Texas, U.S.
- Listed height: 6 ft 1 in (1.85 m)
- Listed weight: 275 lb (125 kg)

Career information
- High school: Dudley (NC) Southern Wayne
- College: Western Carolina
- NFL draft: 2004: undrafted

Career history

Playing
- Buffalo Bills (2004)*; Los Angeles Avengers (2005–2006); Columbus Destroyers (2007); New Orleans VooDoo (2007–2008); New York Sentinels (2009); Hartford Colonials (2010); Arizona Rattlers (2012)*; Los Angeles KISS (2014–2015)
- * Offseason or practice squad member only

Coaching
- Pomona-Pitzer (2017–present) Special teams coordinator & defensive line coach

Awards and highlights
- 2× First-team All-SoCon (2002–2003)

Career AFL statistics
- Total tackles: 56
- Sacks: 13.5
- Forced fumbles: 2
- Stats at ArenaFan.com

Michale Spicer (born June 30, 1982) is an American college football coach and former defensive end. He is the special teams coordinator and defensive line coach for Pomona College and Pitzer College, positions he has held since 2017. He was signed by the Buffalo Bills as an undrafted free agent in 2004. He played college football at Western Carolina.

Save has also been a member of the Los Angeles Avengers, Columbus Destroyers, New Orleans VooDoo, New York Sentinels and Hartford Colonials.
