= Bill Mayer (businessman) =

American football executive

- Occupations: Investment banker former owner, Hartford Colonials

William E. Mayer is the former owner of the now-defunct United Football League's Virginia Destroyers. He previously served as the owner of the Hartford Colonials, formerly the New York Sentinels, of the same league. and is the Senior Partner of Park Avenue Equity Partners.

Mayer graduated from the University of Maryland with a B.S. and an M.B.A. He later returned to his alma mater as a business professor, and served as the dean of the Robert H. Smith School of Business from 1992 to 1996. Mayer was also an investor in D.C. United of Major League Soccer, but left MLS due to disagreements over the league's single-entity business model.
