= Face mask (gridiron football) =

Helmet part covering the face

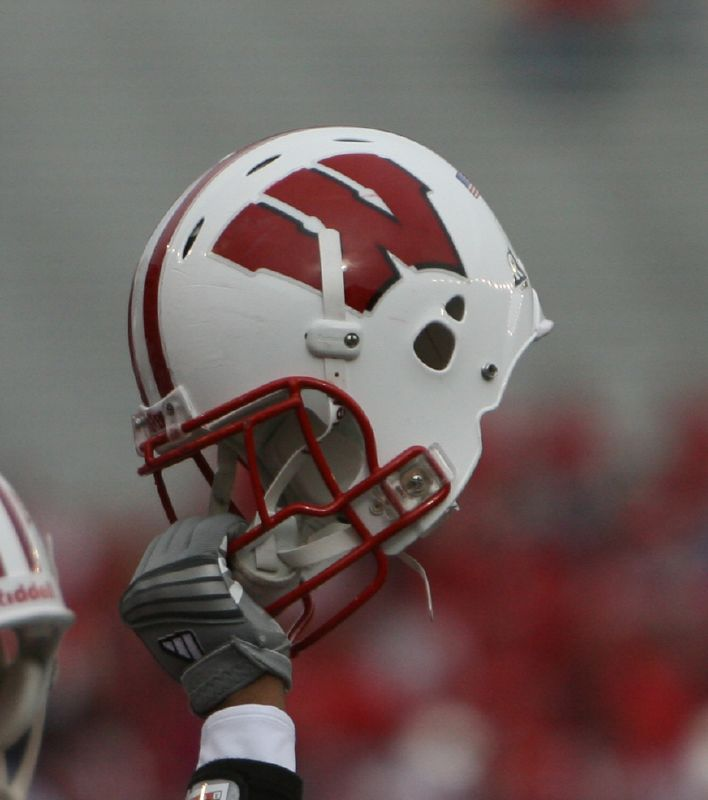
A player holding his helmet by the face mask

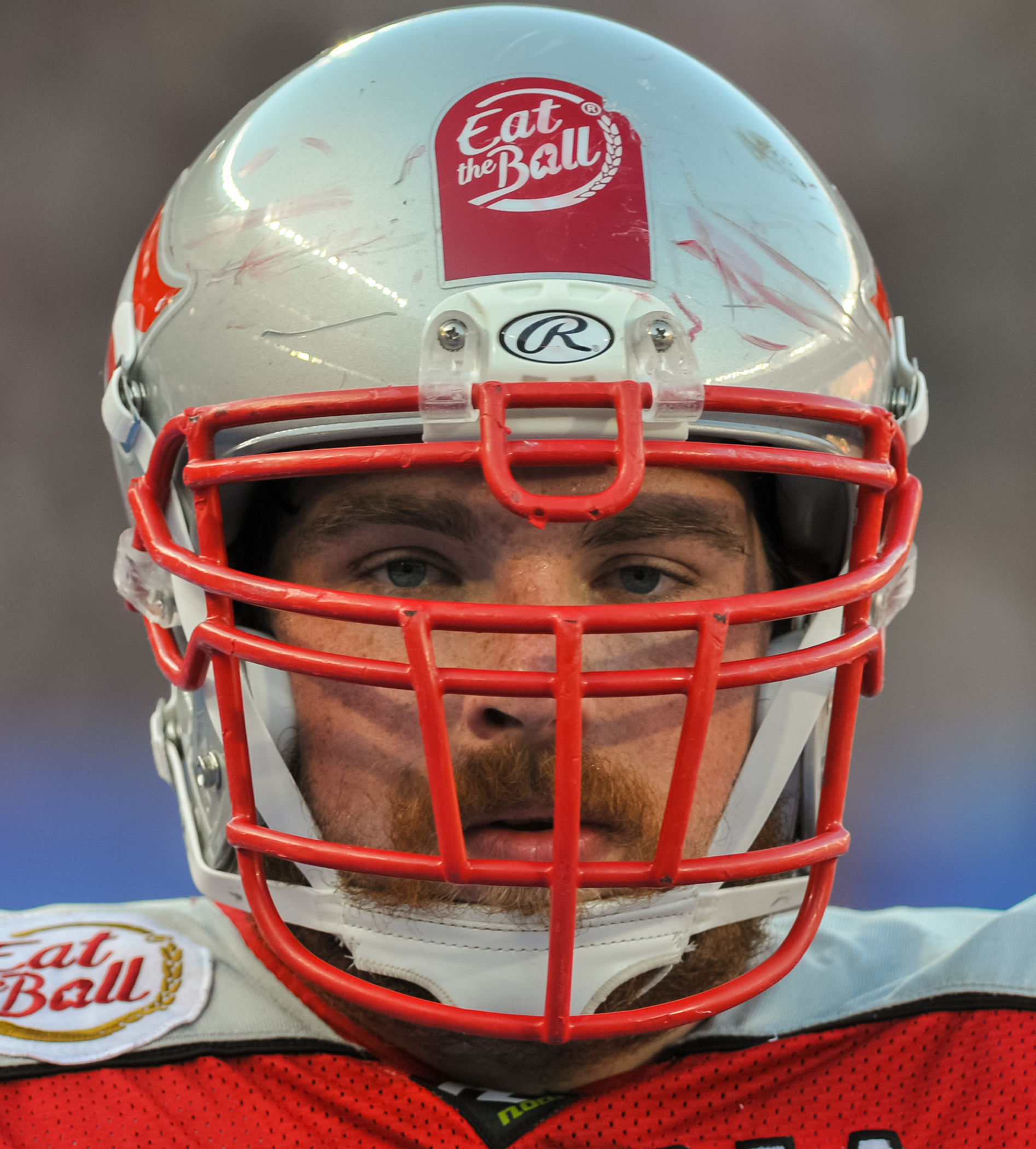
A lineman whose face mask has horizontal and vertical bars

In gridiron football, the face mask is the part of the helmet that directly covers the face. It is a major source of protection for the players, made of metal covered either with a rubber or plastic coating. Early face masks were made of pure plastic.

Details of the face mask may vary according to each player and their needs for their position. For example, the quarterback's face mask in previous years could be just a single horizontal bar, since he has a need to see the entire field; today, quarterbacks, receivers and kickers/punters wear, at minimum, a two-bar face mask. (Single-bar face masks are no longer allowed in most levels, except for players who began using the single bar before the rules were implemented.) Positions such as linemen, however, may have several bars on their face mask, both horizontal and vertical.

In the leather helmet era, an early attempt at face protection was the "executioner" helmet which covered the nose and much of the face. This helmet literally was a face mask bearing a strong likeness to traditional executioner face masks. Another early attempt in the leather helmet era at face protection was the nose guard. These simply covered the player's nose. In modern times, the term "nose guard" describes a player on the interior defensive line, usually aligned opposite the offensive center.

Face masks first came into vogue in football during the second half of the 1950s, after the hard-shell plastic helmet became commonplace, and were adopted voluntarily and universally at all levels of gridiron football within one decade. Hall of fame wide receiver Tommy McDonald was the last NFL player to not wear a face mask, McDonald played his entire career without a face mask before retiring after the 1968 season. Single bars were initially the only available design, and this evolved over the course of the next several decades into the current cage-like designs, which became the norm at all levels by the early 1980s. Single-bar face masks were officially banned in professional football in 2004, with the remaining players still using them allowed to continue wearing them under a grandfather clause; Scott Player was the last player in professional football to wear the single-bar, finishing his career in 2009. Initially, face masks were clear Lucite. They then became brown through the use of a rubber coating, which covered the metal bars; the brown later became a neutral gray, and would remain as such until 1974, when the then-San Diego Chargers and Kansas City Chiefs introduced the first colored face masks to football, rolling out yellow and white face masks, respectively. This opened the door to many teams at all levels of football changing the face mask color, but some have retained gray ones since (the Dallas Cowboys and Las Vegas Raiders have never worn a color other than gray).

== Penalty ==
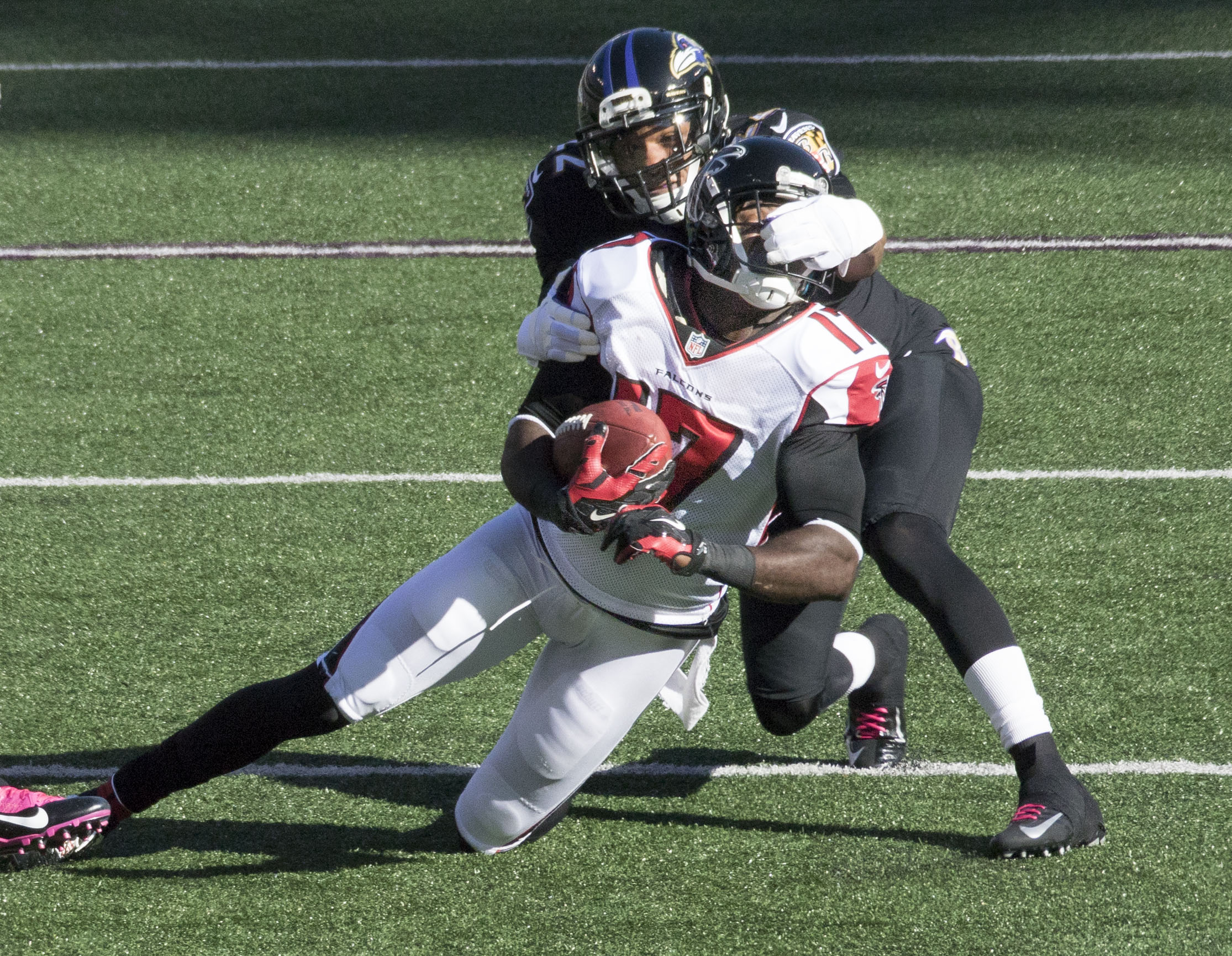
A face mask penalty

The term "face mask" in the game is also used to refer to the foul of illegally touching the equipment. In most leagues, tackling or otherwise restraining a player by grabbing the face mask is illegal due to the risk of injury, and the penalty is severe, drawing 15 yards, and also a first down if committed by the defense. In high school, the penalty is only 5 yards if the act was considered to be "incidental."

Through the 1961 season in the National Football League, the ball carrier's face mask was allowed to be grabbed, but not others. The rule was changed to apply to all players beginning in 1962.
