= United Football League (2009–2012) =

Defunct American professional football league

- Most recent season or competition: 2012 UFL season
- Sport: American football
- Founded: 2007
- First season: 2009
- Folded: 2012; 14 years ago
- CEO: Bill Hambrecht (majority owner)
- Commissioner: Michael Huyghue
- Motto: "If you like great football, you will love the UFL"
- No. of teams: 4
- Country: United States
- Last champion: Virginia Destroyers (1st)
- Most titles: Las Vegas Locomotives (3)
- Broadcasters: CBS Sports Network (2012); Comcast SportsNet (2011); HDNet, Versus (2009–10)

The United Football League (UFL) was a professional American football minor league in the United States that began play in October 2009 and played four seasons, the final one being cut short in October 2012. The small league, which never had more than five teams playing at one time, played most of its games in markets where the National Football League (NFL) had no presence. Unlike most professional football leagues since the 1980s, the UFL played all of its games in the traditional fall season, competing directly with the NFL, college football, and high school football.

The UFL occupied the second tier of professional football in the United States, behind the NFL. The UFL primarily consisted of players who had previously played for an NFL team. Although the league had no connection with the NFL, and had never intended to foster any such connection, some speculated that it could have become a minor or "developmental" league for the NFL, including the UFL's own commissioner.

Early news reports had speculated that based on the UFL's initial plan the league would become a "competitor" to the NFL. The UFL seemed poised to capitalize on fan disgust with the NFL should the established league lock out its players prior to the 2011−12 season. The thought was that the NFL would fail to reach an agreement with the NFL players' union after the end of their collective bargaining agreement. This would have led to the 2011−12 NFL season being delayed or cancelled, leaving the UFL the only pro football available. The NFL did lock out their players, but the situation was resolved in July 2011, before the start of the NFL season. This negated any benefits the UFL might have hoped to reap from the labor dispute.

The league was beset by frequent operational interruptions, stemming from systemic financial shortfalls, especially from summer 2011 onward. The United Football League announced on October 20, 2012, that it was ceasing operations immediately, after four weeks of play. The official line from the league was that they intended to resume operations and complete the unfinished 2012 schedule at an unspecified time in spring 2013, then revert to a fall schedule in fall 2013 without a full off-season. This announcement, however, was met with widespread skepticism from both within and outside the league, skepticism that was proven to be warranted as the league never returned.

Over the course of the league's history, the Las Vegas Locomotives were the most successful team, winning two of the three championships, appearing in (but losing) the third, and having a perfect record for the season at the time of the cessation of operations.

== History ==
=== Development and first season (2007–2009) ===
Original UFL logo (2007–2008)

The United Football League was founded by Bill Hambrecht and Tim Armstrong. The UFL initially had plans to start with eight teams with $12–20 million rosters playing in targeted sites in the fall of 2008. T. Boone Pickens and Mark Cuban had originally been in discussion with the league as potential owners, but both backed out prior to the 2009 season. On February 9, 2009, it was announced that Paul Pelosi, husband of Speaker of the House Nancy Pelosi, was one of four investors who had stepped forward to invest $10,000,000, plus a personal commitment to cover opening-season losses up to another $10,000,000 for a one-half interest in four franchises to play in the league's 2009 inaugural season. The league was under the overall direction of William Hambrecht, a former Wall Street figure who had sold his old firm, Hambrecht & Quist, to what was then Chase Manhattan Bank for US$1.35 billion in 1999.

Michael Huyghue, a former executive with the Jacksonville Jaguars and the head of a sports agency service, was the league's first and only commissioner.

The league had identified 21 cities that they deemed possessed strong economic bases, passionate football tradition, and a high number of average TV viewing households as potential team locations. Target markets in the US included: Austin, Birmingham, Columbus, Hartford, Las Vegas, Los Angeles, Louisville, Memphis, Milwaukee, New York City, Oklahoma City, Orlando, Portland, Raleigh-Durham, Sacramento, Salt Lake City, San Antonio, and San Jose; as well as international markets in London, Mexico City and Monterrey.

With their planned launch date arriving soon and only a couple owners in hand, the UFL decided to go ahead and do a "soft launch" in 2009, similar to the one used by the Arena Football League in its inaugural season in 1987, rather than delaying play another year. The soft launch called for opening the league with fewer teams than planned and playing an abbreviated schedule. They hoped a functioning league would yield the UFL a superior position for attracting potential owners over competing leagues still under development (like the New USFL, which at the time was trumpeting a spring 2010 launch).

The markets chosen for the premiere season were New York City (Sentinels), Las Vegas (Locomotives), Orlando (Florida Tuskers), and the San Francisco Bay Area (California Redwoods). The league's short schedule made the kind of expensive promotional efforts often employed with a new league cost prohibitive. Additionally, the league had a full schedule of three home games in the same stadium in only one of their selected cities, Las Vegas.

During the week of August 10, 2009, the four team names and their uniform jerseys were revealed. Each of the uniforms (and the team logos and helmets that were unveiled on October 2) incorporated the UFL's signature color scheme into their designs, including silver (primary color for the Las Vegas Locomotives), blue (Florida Tuskers), black (New York Sentinels), and lime green and white (California Redwoods). Each of the team jerseys had the same design template, complete with a horizontal arc across the top front that resembles the arc on the UFL's logo.

One of the Redwoods' games was moved to San Jose; the other two were played in San Francisco (the move to San Jose was a short-notice move due to poor attendance in San Francisco; however, the San Jose game ended up being even more poorly attended). The league was unable to secure a fiscally reasonable deal for a stadium within New York City, forcing the league to have the Sentinels play one home game each in Hartford, Connecticut; on the campus of Hofstra University in Long Island, and in New Jersey. In addition, one of the Tuskers' games was played at Tropicana Field in St. Petersburg, Florida, in part because the Tuskers shared ownership that year with the Tampa Bay Rays; this was not reprised in 2010.

The Florida Tuskers finished 2009 with a 6–0 record. The Las Vegas Locomotives were next at 4–2, the California Redwoods were 2–4, and the Sentinels were last at 0–6. The Locomotives played the Tuskers in the 2009 UFL championship game; the Locomotives won the title on a field goal in overtime.

=== Expansion (2010) ===
United Football League progression
Year	Teams	Games played
2009	4	6
2010	5	8
2011	4	4
2012	4	4

Before the 2010 season, the New York Sentinels permanently settled in Hartford, Connecticut, becoming the Hartford Colonials. The new name was chosen by fans through an online vote. The California Redwoods relocated to Sacramento, California, and chose the name Mountain Lions, also from a fan vote. In another change for the 2010 season, each UFL team would gain their own uniform color identity, loosening them from the standard league colors.

For 2010, the league indicated that five markets were under consideration for expansion teams: Omaha, Nebraska; San Antonio or Austin, Texas; Portland, Oregon; and Salt Lake City. On April 15, 2010, Omaha was granted an expansion team, called the Omaha Nighthawks.

Mark Cuban, who was mentioned as a potential franchise owner in the league's formative stages, loaned the league $5 million in April 2010. He did not own a franchise and he was not involved in day-to-day operations of the league nor of any of its teams. In January 2011, Cuban, the owner of the Dallas Mavericks and majority owner of HDNet (now AXS TV), a cable channel and Web-streaming service which had broadcast some games of the league's inaugural two seasons, filed a federal lawsuit against the UFL for their failure to repay the loan by the October 6, 2010, deadline.

For the 2011 season, the UFL announced the addition of a franchise in the Hampton Roads (Norfolk metro area) region of Virginia, originally owned by former CFL owner Jim Speros and managed by former NFL and USFL quarterback Doug Williams. Soon after Speros' ownership was announced, he relinquished control of the team to the league and allowed bidding to be opened again. Williams later joined his alma mater Grambling State University as their head coach, resigning as Destroyers' general manager.

The UFL announced the businessman Joe Moglia, also executive advisor to the head football coach of the University of Nebraska, as the first head coach and president of the Destroyers in November 2010; however, in January 2011, the league announced Moglia would instead coach the Omaha Nighthawks. At the same time, the Florida Tuskers ceased operations in Orlando and moved to Virginia, with Jay Gruden initially remaining as the Destroyers' coach; however, Gruden was hired the next month by the Cincinnati Bengals of the NFL.

For possible 2011 expansion, all cities that were in consideration for 2010 (Portland, San Antonio, Austin, and Salt Lake City) remained in consideration, as well as Raleigh, North Carolina; Los Angeles; and Honolulu. In regards to future expansion, Huyghue has said that they "may never have more than eight teams" depending on the league's economic situation.

The league announced it would expand into the Hampton Roads region of Virginia prior to the start of the 2011 season, giving the Virginia Destroyers time to organize. During UFL Championship Week 2010, the league announced it had a seventh franchise in place, with Huyghue indicating that it would most likely be in Los Angeles, and that the team would not be officially announced until an eighth franchise was confirmed. As events would turn out, neither franchise would materialize.

=== Contraction (2011) ===
The league suffered a setback when they had to fold the Florida Tuskers in January 2011. The league moved most of the Tuskers' staff to the Destroyers and reassigned the coaching staff already in Virginia to Omaha, firing the previous Omaha coaching staff. After this, the league reduced their goal to six teams, with Portland, Oregon; Salt Lake City; and new contender Chattanooga, Tennessee, still in consideration, and Los Angeles no longer in consideration for the third consecutive year. If a sixth team had been added, the schedule for each team would have expanded to ten games.

The schedule for the 2011 UFL season, released June 9, 2011, confirmed that the league would be locked at five teams for the season, with no expansion. The 2011 season was to shift from a traditional late fall schedule to a late summer/early fall schedule beginning in August 2011 and ending in October; however, in July 2011, the UFL announced it would delay the start of its season until mid-September due to financial issues. The league was in negotiations with CBS and TNT for coverage after Versus dropped the UFL as part of its rebranding to NBC Sports Network, but was unable to get any, and the league also lost its existing television partners. After this postponement, the league confirmed it was considering even further contraction, with the Hartford Colonials potentially on the chopping block. On August 10, 2011, the UFL announced that it would "suspend operations" of the Colonials and go forward with a four-team league.

Jerry Glanville, a UFL consultant who had previously been announced as the new head coach of the now-suspended Colonials, began a listening tour of Chattanooga, Salt Lake City and Jackson, Mississippi, in October 2011 to gauge support for UFL expansion franchises. He has stated that of the three, at least "one has a UFL team and one may get a UFL team."

On October 16, 2011, immediately after each team's fourth game, numerous reports indicated that the remainder of the 2011 season had been cancelled and that the 2011 UFL championship game between Las Vegas and Virginia would be moved up to the date of Virginia's last home game, which would have taken place against Omaha on October 21. This is in fact what happened; in addition to the championship game between Virginia and Las Vegas, the season concluded with a third-place game (on the same day) in Omaha between the other two teams, the first such game in outdoor professional gridiron football since the demise of the NFL's old third-place game, the Playoff Bowl, which was last contested in January 1970 following the 1969 season.

=== Shortened season (2012) ===
Despite the difficulties of 2011, UFL officials were on record as wanting to move ahead on future plans for the league. An April 2012 Las Vegas Review-Journal report indicated that the UFL would announce plans on May 1 to field a five-team league for the 2012 season, including the four 2011 teams plus a fifth expansion team. (The Review-Journal report mentioned San Antonio, Southern California, and Portland, Oregon, were expansion candidates.) The report also indicated that the UFL was arranging a broadcast TV deal with CBS Sports Network (a deal the league had desperately sought) to go along with regional supplemental coverage. However, May 1 came and went without any official announcement by the UFL on their future plans. The league had previously entertained input on the possibility of moving from a fall schedule to the spring.

Michael Huyghue, the UFL's original commissioner, resigned from the position on January 31, 2012, citing in part the league's severe financial problems and philosophical differences with the league's owners on how to move forward. Instead, the league dispensed, at least for the time being, with a central office and owners Bill Hambrecht (Las Vegas) and Bill Mayer (Virginia) oversaw the league's business operations, while Locos' coach/president Jim Fassel overseeing football operations. Before the fourth season starts, a rebuilding and restocking of personnel will need to take place. To conserve much-needed funds the Virginia Destroyers relocated to much smaller office space by February 2012. The league remained silent throughout winter, spring and early summer 2012, raising fears that the league had quietly folded, in the same way the proposed All American Football League, without ever actually taking the field, had done in 2010 after repeated delays of its announced inaugural schedule. However, on July 26, 2012, news broke that the UFL would indeed play a fourth season in 2012. Terms had not been finalized, but initial plans called for four teams playing an eight-game schedule (which would require an unbalanced schedule) on Wednesdays and Fridays beginning September 19, 2012. The league did reach a deal to have their games broadcast on CBS sports. On the league's official website on August 1, 2012, an official schedule for 2012, with the September 19 starting date and each team playing an unbalanced, eight-game schedule was posted, matching the earlier speculation. As of that time, final postseason plans remained undecided; the date for the championship game, Friday, November 16, was set, although the location was not. Also left unanswered was the question of whether last season's unusual third-place game would be repeated. On September 6, a revised UFL schedule for 2012 was posted on the Omaha Nighthawks website showing the season rescheduled to begin on Friday, September 28, and end on Saturday, December 1, along with the claim that CBS Sports Network was in full concordance with this revision.

All teams but Sacramento used the same home stadiums as in 2011; the Mountain Lions moved to the Triple-A baseball stadium (Raley Field) of the Sacramento franchise of the Pacific Coast League, the Sacramento River Cats. In addition, the Las Vegas Locomotives also negotiated backup plans with Cashman Field in Las Vegas, although the team was able to play its first two home games at Sam Boyd Stadium.

On October 20, 2012, after four weeks, continued financial shortfalls, an uncertain stadium situation in Las Vegas, and dramatically reduced attendances across all four markets, the UFL ceased operations for the remainder of the 2012 season. According to head of public relations Larry Weismann, the league intended on resuming the canceled schedule some time in spring 2013, with those games counting toward the 2012 season standings, then come back yet again for the next season in fall 2013.

=== Shutdown ===
By spring 2013, 78 players from the 2012 season, two head coaches from 2011 and four assistant coaches from the 2012 season had sued the league ownership for failure to pay their salaries. The Destroyers' business license expired on March 1, 2013, and that team's remaining offices were closed before that date. On March 28, 2013, a report in The Wall Street Journal noted that both the spring 2013 resumption and the fall 2013 season were canceled, and that if the league were to return, it would not have been until spring 2014 at the earliest. The ownership lost or settled most of the lawsuits against them in 2014.

As of 2016, all of the remaining non-liquid assets of the league were sitting in a warehouse in Jacksonville, Florida, with an estimated value of $100,000. The league still owes approximately $1,000,000 to the estate of Dennis Green; under a court ruling, the league itself is liable for Green's salary, as the owners had not personally guaranteed it. Hambrecht has also allegedly not paid the 78 players who sued him for back pay, even as the players won a $2.4 million judgment against Hambrecht. Frank Vuono, an executive with the UFL in its early existence, stated that Hambrecht had simply stopped paying the league's bills.

=== Aftermath ===
The UFL abandoned its trademarks by 2017, when Vince McMahon filed a trademark on the United Football League name. In 2018, he instead announced a new XFL, a brand used by McMahon's defunct football league that played one season in 2001; the new XFL began play in 2020 but went on a two-season hiatus due to the Covid-19 pandemic. In 2023, the XFL—by this time owned by Dany Garcia, Dwayne Johnson and RedBird Capital Partners—re-filed for the UFL and United Football League trademarks ahead of its proposed merger with the United States Football League. On December 31, 2023, the XFL and USFL announced the formation of the modern United Football League. The remnants of the previous league ceded their social media handles, including the @theUFL Twitter handle, to the 2024 UFL on April 6, 2024, with the original account being archived to @OldUFL2009.

The National Gridiron League attempted to relaunch as the UFL, using the existing trademarks and claiming to be a continuation of the original league.

== Financial structure ==
The UFL's original pay structure plan included a player salary cap range of $12–20 million per team with a staff salary cap of $3 million per team. The UFL hoped to be paying at least 10 players on each roster in excess of $1 million each per season. These players would provide name value and legitimacy for the league and would fast track the development of local fanbases and a national TV audience.

The original plan was predicated on luring very wealthy owners like billionaire entrepreneur Mark Cuban. The UFL however ultimately proved unsuccessful in securing commitments from enough of the deep-pocketed owners their original plan required.

By time the initial season began, the league had totally dumped its original salary structure to suit the reality of the soft launch. The league's original plan would have had the average UFL salary in the $240,000-$500,000 range, far in excess of the CFL's average salary. The short schedule gutted the league's ability to generate TV or gate revenue. To make a soft launch financially tolerable, player salaries had to be dramatically scaled back—pro-rated to reflect the shortened season.

An agent representing two players with NFL experience, Jack Bechta, reported his clients were offered UFL contracts at a base salary of $35,000. He confirmed with other agents that $35,000 was the league mandated salary for skill players and $25,000 for punters, place kickers and long snappers, at least for the 2009 inaugural season. One of the players represented by the agent was a quarterback who received an offer of $35,000, although he stated that his negotiations revealed that teams are allowed to pay one quarterback more than the $35,000 salary. Bonuses were limited to $10,000 per player. In addition to the base salary, the league also paid for all housing expenses for its players.

The league's initial salaries were roughly equal to the average per-game salaries in the Canadian Football League and, adjusted for inflation, equivalent to the old XFL. In another similarity to the XFL, teams could offer a sizable performance bonus; former Locomotives starting quarterback J. P. Losman has stated that he received a "nice sized" bonus for winning the 2009 UFL championship game.

In 2010, players earned $6,250 per game, for a total of $50,000 in the regular season; participants in the 2010 UFL championship game were paid a total of $10,000 each, with an additional $10,000 going to each player on the winning team. Starting quarterbacks earned a $200,000 salary.

There was a significant delay in payments after the 2010 season, because of a revenue shortfall, a severe underestimation of expenses, and a delay in a $50,000,000 subsidy from one of the UFL's owners. As of February 2011, the bonuses for the 2010 championship game remained unpaid, as did numerous other bills accrued by the league during the 2010 season. Most of these bills were eventually paid in March.

According to reports that surfaced in May 2011, the base salary for players was reduced to $5,000 per game (including the championship), with only a $1,000 additional bonus for winning the championship game. This contradicted the word of the commissioner, who had previously stated he aimed to increase compensation to $10,000 per game in March.

Pay was further reduced to $3,500 per game for the 2012 season.

Each player was under contract to the UFL through February of the following year, effectively creating a two-month non-compete clause after the season ends, and any NFL team that wished to sign a UFL player was supposed pay a transfer fee of $150,000 (later lowered to $25,000) to the league. This fee was waived after the 2009 season but was more strictly enforced for 2010; in practice, no NFL team ever paid the fee, and the players who did jump to the NFL ended up paying the fee out of their UFL salaries. The league dropped the transfer fee for the 2011 season.

For 2009, each team was unofficially tied to a pair of divisions in the National Football League. In addition to this feature, the league held a draft on June 18, 2009, the UFL premiere season draft. A second draft was held on June 2, 2010. The 2011 UFL draft was held on May 2, with player selections announced via Twitter. No formal draft was staged prior to the 2012 UFL season.

The original plan was for owners to pay $30 million to buy a half interest in a team. The league would own the other half. The UFL had difficulties finding willing owners the UFL leadership considered suitable.

The UFL planned for each team to eventually sell shares to the public that they hoped could raise another $60 million. This never came to pass.

Ultimately, the league accrued financial losses of between $120 million and $150 million over the course of the league's four years of play. Paul Pelosi's investment alone was between $10 million and $50 million, according to federal disclosure forms filed by his wife Nancy. For his part, Pelosi initially anticipated losing $6 million per year, based on an anticipated 20,000 fans per game, and hoped to make up the difference from a renegotiated television contract in 2011 that paid enough rights fees for the league to turn a profit. While he did reach the 20,000 fan threshold in Sacramento in 2010 and 2011, the paying television contract never materialized. Hambrecht sustained losses of $40 million on the league.

== Teams ==
Six teams played in the UFL over the course of its history, no more than five in any given year. The teams that played in the league were: the Las Vegas Locomotives, Hartford Colonials (originally the New York Sentinels), Omaha Nighthawks, Sacramento Mountain Lions (originally the California Redwoods), Florida Tuskers, and Virginia Destroyers. The Florida Tuskers and Virginia Destroyers were legally separate teams, but because the Tuskers folded before the Destroyers began play, the UFL assigned most of the Tuskers' staff to the Destroyers and the two are typically conflated for the purpose of league history.

Only stadiums in which the team played more than one game are listed.

Team	Metro area	Stadium (capacity)	Years active	Last coach	Primary owner
Florida Tuskers	Orlando, Florida	Citrus Bowl (65,438)	2009–10	Jay Gruden	Stuart Sternberg (2009); Joe Theismann (2010)
Hartford Colonials	Hartford, Connecticut	Rentschler Field (40,000)	2009–10	Jerry Glanville	Bill Mayer
Las Vegas Locomotives	Las Vegas, Nevada	Sam Boyd Stadium (36,800)	2009–12	Jim Fassel	Bill Hambrecht & Rob Ryan
Omaha Nighthawks	Omaha, Nebraska	Rosenblatt Stadium (24,000); TD Ameritrade Park (24,000)	2010–12	Bart Andrus	Zach Nelson (2010); Bill Hambrecht (2011–2012)
Sacramento Mountain Lions	Sacramento, California	AT&T Park (41,000); Hornet Stadium (21,000); Raley Field (14,014)	2009–12	Turk Schonert	Paul Pelosi
Virginia Destroyers	Virginia Beach, Virginia	Virginia Beach Sportsplex (14,000)	2011–12	Kurt Schottenheimer	Bill Mayer (2012)

== Seasons ==
Season	Teams	Games	Champion	Record	Runner-Up	Record	Final Score	Average Attendance
2009	4	13	Las Vegas Locomotives	4–2	Florida Tuskers	6–0	20–17 (OT)	9,678
2010	5	21	Las Vegas Locomotives	5–3	Florida Tuskers	5–3	23–20	14,987
2011	4	10	Virginia Destroyers	3–1	Las Vegas Locomotives	3–1	17–3	14,753
2012	4	8	Las Vegas Locomotives	4–0	Omaha Nighthawks	2–2	N/A	3,921

== Rules ==
In an approach similar to previous football leagues, the UFL mostly adhered to standard NFL and football rules with a few differences of note:

- No "Tuck Rule" – In the NFL from 1999 to 2013, if a passer brought his arm forward in a passing motion and then lost possession of the ball as he was attempting to tuck it back toward his body, it was considered a forward pass (and thus an incomplete pass if the ball hits the ground). This "tuck rule" had become one of the most controversial rules in the NFL; in the UFL, however, an identical play was called a fumble. The tuck rule was eliminated by the NFL prior to the 2013 season.
- Blitzing/Rushing – On each play, the defense was required to use four down linemen who must have been in a 3- or 4-point stance at the snap. No more than six defenders could rush the passer. Penalty for violating this rule was illegal defense (signaled as unsportsmanlike conduct), with a 15-yard penalty and a first down. This rule was meant to both protect the quarterback and encourage more scoring. A similar rule was in effect for the NFL's now-defunct Pro Bowl for several years.
- Intentional grounding – A quarterback was allowed to intentionally ground the ball to avoid a sack, provided he got the throw back to the line of scrimmage. He did not have to be outside the pocket to do so.
- Fumbling out of the end zones – If the ball is fumbled forward into and out of the end zone, it is placed back at the spot of the fumble, whereas in the NFL this play is ruled a touchback and possession goes over to the defending team.
- Instant replay – As opposed to the NFL, where the referee reviews disputed plays (other than turnovers, scoring plays, and plays inside the two-minute warning) through a video monitor on the sidelines, all UFL replay reviews were viewed upstairs by a replay official, who had 90 seconds to make a ruling.
- Touchdown celebrations – Player celebrations (individual or group) were permitted only in the end zones or the bench areas.
- Face masks – The UFL allowed the single-bar face mask, which the NFL had outlawed in 2007. Only one player, punter Scott Player, used the single-bar mask.
- Overtime – Starting in 2010 (for the playoffs) and 2012 (for all other games), the NFL has adopted a modified sudden death overtime, where sudden death occurs only if the opening drive of overtime ends in a touchdown (before, any score would immediately end the extra session). The UFL from its inception employed an overtime system that assured each team at least one possession. Therefore, if the first team scored on their opening drive (even if it is a touchdown), their opponent was then given the opportunity to equal that score on the next drive, or surpass it if the other team's first drive resulted in anything less than a touchdown and 2-point conversion. If both teams remain tied after each has had one possession, overtime then reverted to sudden death. If the score remained tied after 15 minutes, the game ended in a tie, except that post-season games will be played to a victorious conclusion. The actual application of the OT rules occurred during the first UFL championship game in 2009 when Las Vegas won on a field goal after the first possession by Florida ended in an interception.

=== Other differences from NFL ===
- Officials – The UFL's roster of on-field officials included two women, head linesman Terri Valenti (who joined the league in 2009) and line judge Sarah Thomas (2010). The officials wore unique attire during the 2009 inaugural season—red polo shirts with black numbering, lettering, and piping, along with black pants and caps that were the same as in the NFL (white cap for the referee, black for the other officials); the combination set them apart from not only their NFL and college counterparts but from the teams on the field, none of whom sported red jerseys in 2009. The officials changed to traditional black-and-white-striped uniforms with green accents starting in 2010.
- Chain crew and markers – Instead of bright orange, the chain crews' equipment (including vests, yardage "sticks", down markers, and endzone pylons) were lime green, one of the UFL's signature colors.

== Scheduling ==
For the 2009 and 2010 seasons, the UFL scheduled its games on non-traditional evenings for pro football: Wednesday, Thursday, Friday, and Saturday evenings. Though these games conflicted with high school and college football events in some locations, the UFL's scheduling plan was different from that of the National Football League, which is prohibited under federal anti-trust exemption law (15 U.S.C. § 1291, i.e., the Sports Broadcasting Act of 1961) from broadcasting any professional game within seventy-five miles of any inter-collegiate or high school game on any Friday or Saturday, beginning with the second Friday in September and ending the second Saturday in December (15 U.S.C. § 1293).

In 2011, the league originally intended to play its games primarily on the traditional Sunday afternoon time setting for professional football, but starting its season in August, a full month before the start of the NFL regular season. However, financial difficulties forced the league to return to its schedule from previous years.

In 2012 it was announced that games would begin in September and that the schedule would be played over eight weeks. When this announcement was made, it had been anticipated that the league would have expanded beyond four active members. Games were to be played on Wednesday and Friday nights with six weeks of regular season action and two weeks of playoffs, culminating with a championship game in early November. The eventual schedule announced in August 2012 varied somewhat from this, with the regular season extended to eight weeks but only one playoff game. A revision announced in early September moved the opening week back to the last week in September. The regular season was to be unbalanced, with each team playing two of the others three times and the third one only twice. The 2012 championship game had originally been rescheduled to be played on December 1; during one week in late October the games were to have been played on Tuesday and Thursday nights.

== Broadcasting ==
All league games except for two during the first two seasons were carried nationally by either Versus or Mark Cuban's HDNet. The arrangement with these two outlets garnered some exposure for the league, but little revenue, as it was obligated to purchase the broadcast time for the games and then attempt to recoup the expense entailed, and potentially any profit, by reselling commercial sponsorships. The only exceptions were two games involving the Hartford Colonials, games that Versus originally held rights to, rights that were granted to New England Sports Network in 2010. In 2009, Versus carried eight games (including the championship), mostly on Thursday nights, while HDNet carried the remaining five. All games were available in high definition. Versus' new play-by-play team for 2010 consisted of former TNN announcer Craig Minervini on play-by-play, Doug Flutie as color analyst, ex-NFL linebacker Ryan Nece on the sidelines and Damon Hack of Sports Illustrated included. HDNet had Kenny Rice as play-by-play commentator, Paul Maguire as color commentator, and Ron Kruck and Paul Crane on the sidelines. The New England Sports Network had Mike Logan for one game and Brett Haber for the other game, with Scott Zolak providing color commentary and John Chandler and Tony Terzi on the sidelines. All of the games were webcast for those fans who didn't have either of the stations.

Neither Versus nor HDNet agreed to carry games in 2011. Three games were picked up by Comcast SportsNet California, all of which involved the Mountain Lions at home; Grant Napear doing play-by-play while Jerry Glanville handled color commentary, with additional contributions by Mike Lamb, Mike Pawlawski, and Dan Dibley. The Destroyers reached an agreement with Comcast SportsNet Mid-Atlantic for coverage of two regular season home games, one of which was never actually played; Glanville again provided color commentary, while CSN broadcasters Brent Harris and Dave Johnson called play-by-play for the Sacramento and Omaha games respectively. The date for the second Destroyers game scheduled to be covered by Comcast Mid-Atlantic became the actual date of the rescheduled 2011 UFL championship game, which was then broadcast by Comcast SportsNet Mid-Atlantic, which was the game's sole television broadcaster. Internet streaming also resumed for the 2011 season, albeit with a new carrier Veetle streaming the game to the Web and to mobile devices.

For 2012, the UFL stated they would broadcast all games live nationally on CBS Sports Network while supplementing that with regional programming. The league finalized their deal with CBS Sports Network on July 26, 2012. It was later revealed that this deal included no payment of any kind from CBS Sports, and the UFL was required to pay all projected television production costs (approximately $150,000 per game) up front each week: unlike conventional sports television agreements where the network pays the league and/or team, the UFL actually had to pay CBS Sports to air its games, meaning that the league was then responsible for selling advertising time to recoup its expenses and generate any revenues from the broadcasts. The 2012 season was not broadcast on the Internet, in part due to the league Webmaster leaving during the previous off-season.

In 2010, all five UFL teams signed agreements with local radio stations to carry play-by-play, a marked contrast from 2009, when no games were carried on radio. The Hartford Colonials were broadcast on WPOP and broadcast two games locally on NESN that didn't air on HDNet or Versus. The Florida Tuskers were broadcast on WYGM. The Locos broadcast on KWWN (or KBAD when conflicts arose). KHTK carries Mountain Lions games, while KOZN was the radio home of the Nighthawks. In 2011, WVSP-FM and WGH-AM became the broadcast homes of the Destroyers. Radio broadcasts continued in Sacramento and Omaha in 2012, but were discontinued in Las Vegas and Virginia.

== Training facilities ==
During 2009, the UFL used two sites for the teams' training camps and regular season practices, with California and Las Vegas using a $20 million facility constructed by the City of Casa Grande, Arizona, and Florida and New York practicing at the Citrus Bowl in Orlando after failing to come to terms with Vero Beach, Florida, on the use of that city's former Dodgertown facility. Beginning in 2010, the league's teams trained and practiced in facilities in their own home markets; in 2012, Sacramento trained at Charles C. Hughes Stadium, Las Vegas trained at The Henderson International School and Omaha trained at the local Kroc Center.

== The William Hambrecht Trophy ==
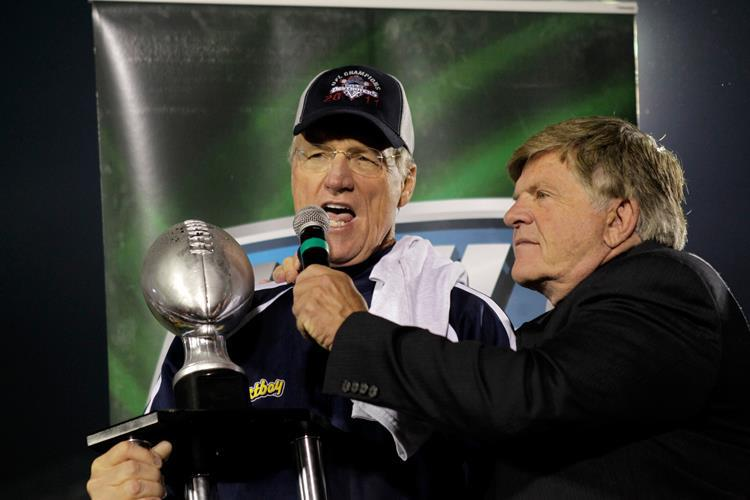
Marty Schottenheimer holding the William Hambrecht Trophy while being interviewed by Jerry Glanville

The trophy given annually to the UFL champions was The William Hambrecht Trophy, named after the Las Vegas Locos owner and UFL founder. When the trophy was first awarded in 2009, the Hambrecht Trophy displayed similar qualities to the Vince Lombardi Trophy. It featured the star from the UFL logo with a streak coming off of one of the corners down onto the base. This design was scrapped after year one. For the 2010 season, the Hambrecht Trophy was redesigned. The second design featured two bases in the shape of the UFL logo connected by four columns with a UFL football on a kicking tee placed on the top base. The previous design was then used as the championship game MVP trophy.

Following the end of the UFL, the whereabouts and fate of the trophy is currently unknown.

== See also ==
- UFL championship game
