= Hartford Colonials =

Defunct American football team

Logo

General information
- Founded: 2009
- Folded: 2011
- Stadium: Giants Stadium (2009); James M. Shuart Stadium (2009); Pratt & Whitney Stadium at Rentschler Field (2009–2010)
- Headquartered: Hartford, Connecticut
- Colors: Blue, Metallic Gold

Personnel
- Owner: Bill Mayer

The Hartford Colonials, originally the New York Sentinels, were a professional American football team that played in the United Football League in its 2009 and 2010 seasons. A charter member of the UFL, the Sentinels began play in 2009 nominally representing New York City but playing its home games in three stadiums, none of which were in the city proper: Pratt & Whitney Stadium at Rentschler Field in East Hartford, Connecticut; Shuart Stadium in Hempstead, New York (on Long Island); and the now-demolished Giants Stadium in East Rutherford, New Jersey. (The Sentinels had scheduled a game for Citi Field in Queens but relocated that game to Long Island.) As the Colonials, the team played all of its home games at Rentschler Field in East Hartford, representing the adjacent city of Hartford. League-wide financial problems and the high rate of rent at Rentschler Field led to the league suspending the Colonials' operations in August 2011, a month before it would have begun play in its third season. The league had stated that the Colonials could be brought back for the 2012 UFL season, if it were to be played, but the announcement of the 2012 season removed Hartford's logo (which had remained on the site in 2011, with indication it had been suspended) from the UFL Web site and did not include the team in the league's 2012 schedule.

The Colonials and Sentinels were historically the worst of the UFL's five teams, having a combined record of 3–11 (.214) and finishing in last place in both seasons. They hold the dubious distinction of accumulating the league's only winless record in 2009.

The team had three head coaches in its history. Ted Cottrell coached the Sentinels in 2009 and was fired after that season. Chris Palmer coached the 2010 season, before he was hired by the Tennessee Titans as their offensive coordinator in 2011. Former NFL head coach Jerry Glanville was named as his replacement for 2011 but the team folded before he coached a game.

== Franchise history ==
=== New York Sentinels (2009) ===
New York Sentinels logo

Both New York and Hartford were among the six inaugural teams originally announced for the 2009 season, along with Las Vegas, Los Angeles, Orlando, and San Francisco. When the league contracted to four teams prior to the start of that season, Hartford's and New York's teams were merged into one, maintaining the New York name.

The team began play as the Sentinels in October 2009, with home games split between Giants Stadium in East Rutherford, New Jersey, James M. Shuart Stadium in Hempstead, New York, and Rentschler Field (one home game in each venue). The league had planned to play at least one game in New York City proper (at Citi Field), but this never materialized, and the proposed game was moved to Shuart Stadium.

Former NFL assistant Ted Cottrell was hired as the team's head coach. The Sentinels posted a 0–6 record and Cottrell was fired following the season.

=== Hartford Colonials (2010) ===
In February 2010, the team moved to Hartford, Connecticut for the 2010 season, a move initially opposed by team owner Bill Mayer. Through an online vote, fans were asked to select one of four names (Hartford Knights, Hartford Guardians, Hartford Travelers or Connecticut Yankees) to become the new team name, or to suggest a name not listed. The new name was announced as being the Hartford Colonials on March 14, 2010. "Colonials" was not one of the four names voters could choose from, but was said to become an "overwhelming favorite" among the fan suggested names. The team's logo and colors were revealed May 24, 2010 to have a blue and metallic gold scheme, the first of the UFL teams to have broken from the league's standardized color scheme.

Northland AEG, L.L.C., the operators of Rentschler Field, purchased a stake in the franchise upon the team's arrival in Hartford, though exactly what size share the company owned is unknown.

The team also hired former Cleveland Browns head coach Chris Palmer to be their head coach and general manager.

The Colonials became the first UFL team to agree to broadcast their games on radio; games were aired on WPOP. They were also the first to sign a deal with a regional sports network, with two of the Colonials' games carried on New England Sports Network.

The Colonials presented a living history program that featured Revolutionary War soldiers with muskets, a horseman portraying Connecticut hero David Humphreys, and a period cannon and crew in the end zone that fired after every Colonials score, all interacting with fans before and during the home games. This was featured in video and on the web at their last game in 2010 against the Las Vegas Locomotives by ESPN.

The Colonials were a bellwether for many of the problems that would plague the league beginning at the end of the 2010 season; the team narrowly averted a strike in protest to a proposed transfer fee that would have effectively prevented players from signing on with a National Football League franchise after the season ended.

=== Suspension ===
Palmer departed after the 2010 season to take the role of offensive coordinator for the Tennessee Titans of the NFL. In March 2011, the league named Jerry Glanville as the Colonials' head coach for the 2011 season. An agreement had not yet been secured for the team to return to Rentschler Field until June 2011; unpaid debts and a change in stadium management held up negotiations. The Colonials reached a deal with Rentschler Field in late June 2011.

Weeks after rumors surfaced that the team could be in danger of being contracted, the league suspended operations of the Colonials on August 10, 2011, and offered Glanville a position as a consultant with the league. Team owner Bill Mayer was transferred to the Virginia Destroyers.

== Notable football players ==
- Lorenzo Booker – NFL running back for the Minnesota Vikings and Miami Dolphins, played for the Colonials in 2010.
- Quintin Demps – NFL safety for the Chicago Bears, played for the Colonials in 2010.
- Kevin Jones – NFL running back for the Detroit Lions and Chicago Bears, played for the Colonials in 2010.
- Danny Lansanah – NFL linebacker for the Tampa Bay Buccaneers, played for the Colonials in 2010 and Sentinels in 2009.
- Josh McCown – NFL quarterback for the Philadelphia Eagles, played for the Colonials in 2010.
- Scott Player – NFL punter who played 10 seasons in the NFL, played for the Sentinels in 2009. Player was permitted to wear his trademark single-bar face mask during his stint with the Sentinels.
- Simeon Rice – NFL defensive end for the Arizona Cardinals and Tampa Bay Buccaneers, played for the Sentinels in 2009.

== Season-by-season records ==
Team	Season	W	L	T	Avg.	Finish	Post Season	Awards
New York Sentinels	2009	0	6	0	.000	4th		
Hartford Colonials	2010	3	5	0	.375	4th		
Totals		3	11	0	.214	–	–	–

=== Records vs. teams ===
This includes postseason games.

Team	Record	Percent
Las Vegas Locomotives	1–3	.250
Florida Tuskers	0–4	.000
Omaha Nighthawks	0–2	.000
Sacramento Mountain Lions	2–2	.500

=== Home, away, and neutral records ===
Location	Record	Percent
Home	2–5	.286
Away	1–6	.143
Neutral	0–0	.000

=== Starting quarterbacks ===
Season(s)	Regular season
New York Sentinels
2009	Quinn Gray (5) / Ingle Martin (1)
Hartford Colonials
2010	Josh McCown (8)
