= 2009 Las Vegas Locomotives season =

American football team season

- Owner: Bill Hambrecht
- General manager: Rick Mueller
- Head coach: Jim Fassel
- Home stadium: Sam Boyd Stadium

Results
- Record: 4–2
- Division place: 2nd
- Playoffs: Won Championship Game (Florida) 20–17 (OT)

Uniform

The 2009 Las Vegas Locomotives season was the first season for the Las Vegas Locomotives. In the United Football League's Premiere Season, the Locomotives posted a 4–2 record, finishing in second place. They defeated the Florida Tuskers in the 2009 UFL Championship Game in overtime.

== Draft ==
The draft took place on June 19, 2009. Those selected were among participants in earlier workouts held in Orlando as well as Las Vegas. Once a player was picked by a team, his rights were held by that team should he elect to play in the UFL.

= Indicates player signed with team

Player	Position	College
Adam Archuleta	DB	Arizona State
Adrian Awasom	DE	North Texas
Danny Baugher	P	Arizona
Jason Boone	OG	Utah
Wendell Bryant	NT	Wisconsin
Ezra Butler	LB	Nevada
Wale Dada	DB	Washington State
George Gause	T	South Carolina
Paul Gause	DB	Seton Hall
Andrew Jacas	K	Fort Valley State
Nate Jackson	TE	Menlo
Brandon Joyce	T	Illinois State
David Kircus	WR	Grand Valley State
Scott Kuhn	TE	Louisville
Gabe Long	NT	Utah
Brandon Moore	LB	Oklahoma
Ronnie Palmer	LB	Arizona
Gary Stills	LB	West Virginia
Tyson Thompson	RB	San Jose State
Andrae Thurman	WR	Southern Oregon
Brian Toal	LB	Boston College
Nick Turnbull	DB	Florida International
Chaz Williams	DB	Oregon
Terrence Whitehead	RB	Oregon

== Staff ==
2009 Las Vegas Locomotives staff
Front office: Owner – Bill Hambrecht; Owner – Rob Ryan; Vice President/General Manager (UFL) – Rick Mueller; Director of football operations – Chuck Shelton; Player personnel – Randy Ball; Head coaches: Head coach – Jim Fassel; Offensive coaches: Running backs – Amp Lee; Running backs – Chuck Shelton; Wide receivers – Mike Wilson; Special teams/tight ends – Eric Van Heusen; Offensive line – Don Eck	Defensive coaches: Defensive coordinator/special teams – Larry Mac Duff; Defensive line – Kevin Wolthausen; Defensive backs – Isaac Carter; Defensive assistant – Sam Garnes

== Roster ==
2009 Las Vegas Locomotives final roster
Quarterbacks: 7 J. P. Losman; 12 Russ Michna; 3 Tim Rattay; Running backs: 44 E. J. Barthel; 27 DeDe Dorsey; 39 Josh Scobey; 26 Marcel Shipp; Wide receivers: 89 Casey Flair; 84 Brian Hernandez; 80 David Kircus; 85 Samie Parker; 13 Tab Perry; 81 Andrae Thurman; Tight ends: 87 Adam Bergen; 83 John Madsen; 86 Jake Nordin	Offensive linemen: 65 Martin Bibla G; 79 Jesse Boone C; 75 Branndon Braxton T; 73 Jason Capizzi T; 53 Frank Davis G; 66 Robby Felix C; 76 Brandon Joyce T; 70 Jeremy Parquet T; 74 Tavares Washington G; Defensive linemen: 95 Adrian Awasom DE; 94 George Gause DE; 93 Eric Henderson DE; 78 Ross Kolodziej DT; 99 Gabe Long DT; 98 Josh Mallard DE; 97 Lauvale Sape DT; 91 Shaun Smith DT	Linebackers: 59 Ezra Butler OLB; 54 Teddy Lehman MLB; 56 Brandon Moore OLB; 52 Ronnie Palmer MLB; 57 Marcus Riley OLB; 55 Gary Stills OLB; 51 Brian Toal OLB; Defensive backs: 24 Wale Dada CB; 23 Marcus Hamilton CB; 25 Greg Laybourn SS; 34 Jamal Lewis FS; 33 Tony Parrish SS; 20 Joe Porter CB; 36 Isaiah Trufant CB; 21 Nick Turnbull FS; 31 Trey Young SS	Special teams: 8 Danny Baugher P; 9 Graham Gano K; 60 Rigo Morales LS; Reserve lists: 77 Wendell Bryant DT (IR); 23 Brandon Sumrall CB (IR); rookies in italics 52 Active, 2 Inactive

== Schedule ==
=== Regular season ===
Week	Date	Opponent	Result	Record	Venue	Attendance
1	October 8	California Redwoods	W 30–17	1–0	Sam Boyd Stadium	18,187
2	October 14	Florida Tuskers	L 15–29	1–1	Sam Boyd Stadium	12,160
3	Bye					
4	October 30	at Florida Tuskers	L 24–27	1–2	Tropicana Field	11,354
5	November 4	at New York Sentinels	W 41–10	2–2	James M. Shuart Stadium	4,392
6	November 14	at California Redwoods	W 16–10	3–2	Spartan Stadium	4,312
7	November 20	New York Sentinels	W 41–7	4–2	Sam Boyd Stadium	13,306

=== Championship Game ===
Round	Date	Opponent	Result	Record	Venue	Attendance
Championship	November 27	Florida Tuskers	W 20–17 (OT)	1–0	Sam Boyd Stadium	14,801

== Standings ==
United Football League
	W	L	T	PCT	PF	PA	STK
y-Florida Tuskers	6	0	0	1.000	183	92	W6
y-Las Vegas Locomotives	4	2	0	.667	167	100	W3
California Redwoods	2	4	0	.333	105	134	L2
New York Sentinels	0	6	0	.000	56	185	L6

y-denotes team advanced to 2009 UFL championship game

== Game summaries ==
=== Week 1: vs. California Redwoods ===
Quarter	1	2	3	4	Total
Redwoods	0	14	3	0	17
Locomotives	3	7	10	10	30

at Sam Boyd Stadium, Whitney, Nevada

- Date: Thursday, October 8, 2009
- Game time: 9:00 p.m. ET
- Game attendance: 18,187
- Referee: Jon Bible
- TV announcers (Versus): Dave Sims & Doug Flutie

Game information

1st quarter

- LV – Graham Gano 33-yard field goal, 3:20

2nd quarter

- CA – Shane Boyd 4-yard run (Parker Douglass kick), 11:03
- CA – Cory Ross 4-yard run (Parker Douglass kick), 8:45
- LV – DeDe Dorsey 1-yard pass from J. P. Losman (Graham Gano kick), 0:13

3rd quarter

- LV – Adam Bergen 11-yard pass from J. P. Losman (Graham Gano kick), 11:07
- LV – Graham Gano 39-yard field goal, 8:05
- CA – Parker Douglass 26-yard field goal, 0:52

4th quarter

- LV – Graham Gano 53-yard field goal, 10:20
- LV – DeDe Dorsey 9-yard run (Graham Gano kick), 2:18

Passing

- CA – Shane Boyd – 9/22, 92 yards
- LV – J. P. Losman – 21/31, 226 yards, 2 TD

Rushing

- CA – Cory Ross – 16 att, 47 yards, 1 TD
- LV – Marcel Shipp – 17 att, 69 yards

Receiving

- CA – Joe West – 3 rec, 37 yards
- LV – Andrae Thurman – 6 rec, 76 yards

=== Week 2: vs. Florida Tuskers ===
Quarter	1	2	3	4	Total
Tuskers	7	9	6	7	29
Locomotives	0	0	0	15	15

at Sam Boyd Stadium, Whitney, Nevada

- Date: Wednesday, October 14, 2009
- Game time: 9:00 p.m. ET
- Game attendance: 12,160
- Referee: Dave Cutaia
- TV announcers (Versus): Dave Sims & Doug Flutie

Game information

1st quarter

- FL – Frank Murphy 5-yard pass from Brooks Bollinger (Matt Bryant kick), 11:11

2nd quarter

- FL – Matt Bryant 22-yard field goal, 11:02
- FL – Matt Bryant 41-yard field goal, 1:51
- FL – Matt Bryant 30-yard field goal, 0:05

3rd quarter

- FL – Chas Gessner 12-yard pass from Brooks Bollinger (Matt Bryant kick), 4:33

4th quarter

- LV – DeDe Dorsey safety, 14:20
- FL – Taye Biddle 17-yard pass from Brooks Bollinger (Matt Bryant kick), 9:39
- LV – Samie Parker 11-yard pass from J. P. Losman (DeDe Dorsey rush failed), 7:10
- LV – Samie Parker 2-yard pass from J. P. Losman (Graham Gano kick), 1:56

Passing

- FL – Brooks Bollinger – 24/32, 310 yards, 3 TD
- LV – J. P. Losman – 19/35, 239 yards, 2 TD, 1 INT

Rushing

- FL – Tatum Bell – 11 att, 53 yards
- LV – Marcel Shipp – 10 att, 39 yards

Receiving

- FL – Taye Biddle – 7 rec, 107 yards, 1 TD
- LV – Samie Parker – 6 rec, 85 yards, 2 TD

=== Week 4: at Florida Tuskers ===
Quarter	1	2	3	4	Total
Locomotives	0	14	3	7	24
Tuskers	0	7	10	10	27

at Tropicana Field, St. Petersburg, Florida

- Date: Friday, October 30, 2009
- Game time: 7:00 p.m. ET
- Game attendance: 11,354
- Referee: Dave Cutaia
- TV announcers (HDNet): Kenny Rice & Paul Maguire
- Recap

Game information

2nd quarter

- FL – Marcus Maxwell 9-yard pass from Brooks Bollinger (Matt Bryant kick), 11:54
- LV – Tab Perry 60-yard pass from J. P. Losman (Graham Gano kick), 5:11
- LV – DeDe Dorsey 22-yard run (Graham Gano kick), 2:46

3rd quarter

- FL – Marcus Maxwell 46-yard pass from Brooks Bollinger (Matt Bryant kick), 12:04
- LV – Graham Gano 40-yard field goal, 9:01
- FL – Matt Bryant 31-yard field goal, 4:51

4th quarter

- FL – Tatum Bell 1-yard run (Matt Bryant kick), 8:10
- LV – John Madsen 2-yard pass from J. P. Losman (Graham Gano kick), 7:01
- FL – Matt Bryant 40-yard field goal, 4:38

Passing

- LV – J. P. Losman – 19/31, 252 yards, 2 TD, 1 INT
- FL – Brooks Bollinger – 22/35, 323 yards, 2 TD, 1 INT

Rushing

- LV – DeDe Dorsey – 12 att, 139 yards, 1 TD
- FL – Tatum Bell – 20 att, 65 yards, 1 TD

Receiving

- LV – Tab Perry – 3 rec, 96 yards, 1 TD
- FL – Jayson Foster – 4 rec, 93 yards

=== Week 5: at New York Sentinels ===
Quarter	1	2	3	4	Total
Locomotives	10	14	3	14	41
Sentinels	0	7	3	0	10

at James M. Shuart Stadium, Hempstead, New York

- Date: Wednesday, November 4, 2009
- Game time: 7:00 p.m. ET
- Game attendance: 4,392
- Referee: Dave Cutaia
- TV announcers (Versus): Dave Sims & Doug Flutie

Game information

1st quarter

- LV – Marcel Shipp 1-yard run (Graham Gano kick), 6:36
- LV – Graham Gano 44-yard field goal, 0:22

2nd quarter

- LV – Marcel Shipp 6-yard run (Graham Gano kick), 10:17
- NY – Steve Sanders 2-yard pass from Ingle Martin (Piotr Czech kick), 2:28
- LV – Adam Bergen 14-yard pass from J. P. Losman (Graham Gano kick), 0:53

3rd quarter

- NY – Piotr Czech 38-yard field goal, 6:57
- LV – Graham Gano 49-yard field goal, 0:13

4th quarter

- LV – Josh Scobey 17-yard pass from J. P. Losman (Graham Gano kick), 9:18
- LV – Trey Young 75-yard interception return (Graham Gano kick), 6:45

Passing

- LV – J. P. Losman – 27/37, 277 yards, 2 TD
- NY – Ingle Martin – 21/36, 173 yards, 1 TD, 1 INT

Rushing

- LV – Marcel Shipp – 12 att, 34 yards, 2 TD
- NY – Shannon Woods – 12 att, 45 yards

Receiving

- LV – Josh Scobey – 5 rec, 73 yards, 1 TD
- NY – Shannon Woods – 2 rec, 34 yards

=== Week 6: at California Redwoods ===
Quarter	1	2	3	4	Total
Locomotives	0	3	3	10	16
Redwoods	7	0	3	0	10

at Spartan Stadium, San Jose, California

- Date: Saturday, November 14, 2009
- Game time: 9:00 p.m. ET
- Game attendance: 4,312
- Referee: Jon Bible
- TV announcers (HDNet): Kenny Rice & Paul Maguire

Game information

1st quarter

- CA – Cory Ross 3-yard run (Parker Douglass kick), 2:10

2nd quarter

- LV – Graham Gano 35-yard field goal, 1:04

3rd quarter

- LV – Graham Gano 39-yard field goal, 8:02
- CA – Parker Douglass 28-yard field goal, 2:27

4th quarter

- LV – Andrae Thurman 8-yard pass from J. P. Losman (Graham Gano kick), 11:53
- LV – Graham Gano 33-yard field goal, 2:01

Passing

- LV – J. P. Losman – 16/29, 199 yards, 1 TD
- CA – Shane Boyd – 21/31, 194 yards, 1 INT

Rushing

- LV – Marcel Shipp – 19 att, 66 yards
- CA – Cory Ross – 19 att, 111 yards, 1 TD

Receiving

- LV – David Kircus – 4 rec, 104 yards
- CA – Joe West – 5 rec, 44 yards

=== Week 7: vs. New York Sentinels ===
Quarter	1	2	3	4	Total
Sentinels	0	0	0	7	7
Locomotives	7	10	21	3	41

at Sam Boyd Stadium, Whitney, Nevada

- Date: Friday, November 20, 2009
- Game time: 9:00 p.m. ET
- Game attendance: 13,306
- Referee: Jon Bible
- TV announcers (HDNet): Kenny Rice & Paul Maguire

Game information

1st quarter

- LV – Ezra Butler 17-yard blocked kick return (Graham Gano kick), 13:44

2nd quarter

- LV – Jake Nordin 4-yard pass from Tim Rattay (Graham Gano kick), 12:39
- LV – Graham Gano 32-yard field goal, 5:40

3rd quarter

- LV – Samie Parker 3-yard pass from Tim Rattay (Graham Gano kick), 11:04
- LV – Marcel Shipp 1-yard run (Graham Gano kick), 8:49
- LV – DeDe Dorsey 5-yard run (Graham Gano kick), 2:37

4th quarter

- NY – Charles Ali 1-yard run (Graham Gano kick), 13:25
- LV – Graham Gano 34-yard field goal, 6:46

Passing

- NY – Ingle Martin – 11/23, 131 yards, 2 INT
- LV – Tim Rattay – 10/21, 97 yards, 2 TD

Rushing

- NY – Shannon Woods – 8 att, 24 yards
- LV – DeDe Dorsey – 14 att, 60 yards, 1 TD

Receiving

- NY – Cortez Hankton – 6 rec, 68 yards
- LV – David Kircus – 2 rec, 37 yards
