= 2009 Florida Tuskers season =

American football league season

- Owner: Stuart Sternberg (Tampa Bay Rays)
- General manager: Rick Mueller
- Head coach: Jim Haslett
- Home stadium: Florida Citrus Bowl; Tropicana Field

Results
- Record: 6–0
- Division place: 1st
- Playoffs: Lost Championship Game (Las Vegas) 20–17 (OT)

Uniform

The 2009 Florida Tuskers season was the first season for the Florida Tuskers. In the UFL's Premiere Season, the Tuskers put together a league-best, undefeated 6–0 record. In the championship game however, they lost to the Las Vegas Locomotives in overtime.

The Tuskers played three home games in the six game regular season. Two games were played at the Citrus Bowl in Orlando, and one was played at Tropicana Field in St. Petersburg.

Following the conclusion of the season, quarterback Brooks Bollinger was named season MVP, and head coach Jim Haslett was given the Coach of the Year award.

== Prior to season ==
Jim Haslett, former NFL head coach of the New Orleans Saints and St. Louis Rams, was named head coach of the then unnamed franchise, on March 11, 2009.

The team name, uniforms, and colors were unveiled on August 12, 2009. On the same day it was announced that the Tampa Bay Rays had bought interest in the team.

== Draft ==
The draft took place on June 19, 2009. Those selected were among participants in earlier workouts held in Orlando as well as Las Vegas. Once a player was picked by a team, his rights were held by that team should he elect to play in the UFL. With their first selection, the Tuskers picked former Arkansas nose tackle Fred Bledsoe.

= Indicates player signed with team

Player	Position	College
Fred Bledsoe	NT	Arkansas
Brooks Bollinger	QB	Wisconsin
Ronnie Cruz	FB	Northern State
Mike Doss	DB	Ohio State
Greg Fassitt	DB	Grambling
Chas Gessner	WR	Brown
Keith Heinrich	TE	Sam Houston State
Rien Long	NT	Washington State
Grant Mason	DB	Michigan
Tim McGarigle	LB	Northwestern
Chris Perry	RB	Michigan
Rob Petitti	T	Pittsburgh
Zach Piller	OG	Florida
Eric Powell	DE	Florida State
Anthony Schlegel	LB	Ohio State
Bo Schobel	DE	TCU
Dominique Thompson	WR	William & Mary
DeJuan Tribble	CB	Boston College
Larry Tripplett	NT	Washington
Darius Vinnett	DB	Arkansas
Seth Wand	T	Northwest Missouri State
Jermaine Wiggins	TE	Georgia
Quincy Wilson	RB	West Virginia
T. J. Wright	DB	Ohio

== Staff ==
2009 Florida Tuskers staff
Front office: Owner – Stuart Sternberg (via Tampa Bay Rays); Vice-president/general manager (UFL) – Rick Mueller; Director of football operations – Ricky Porter; Head coaches: Head coach – Jim Haslett; Offensive coaches: Offensive coordinator – Jay Gruden; Running backs – Ricky Porter; Wide receivers – Ike Hilliard; Wide receivers/quality control – Sean McVay; Special teams/tight ends – Al Roberts; Offensive line – Bill Laveroni	Defensive coaches: Defensive line – Carl Hairston; Linebackers – Chuck Bresnahan; Secondary – Bill Bradley

== Roster ==
2009 Florida Tuskers final roster
Quarterbacks: 8 Brooks Bollinger; 14 Chris Greisen; Running backs: 25 Tatum Bell; 34 Andrew Pinnock; 22 Michael Pittman; 21 Shaud Williams; Wide receivers: 15 Taye Biddle; 18 Jayson Foster; 11 Marcus Maxwell; 82 Frank Murphy; 9 Bobby Sippio; 81 Micheal Spurlock; Tight ends: 83 Jonathan Dekker; 87 Keith Heinrich; 89 Ryan Neufeld; 85 Jermaine Wiggins	Offensive linemen: 69 P. J. Alexander G; 62 Dan Buenning G/C; 66 Anthony Davis G; 58 Enoka Lucas C; 53 Fred Matua G; 78 Rob Petitti T; 77 Charles Spencer T; 75 Seth Wand T; 72 Julius Wilson T; Defensive linemen: 76 Fred Bledsoe DT; 68 McKinley Boykin DT; 56 Patrick Chukwurah DE; 97 Josh Cooper DE; 91 Eric Powell DE; 93 Josh Savage DE; 98 Darrion Scott DE; 92 Willie Williams DT; 99 Claude Wroten DT	Linebackers: 50 Colby Bockwoldt OLB; 54 Quinton Culberson OLB; 59 Tim McGarigle MLB; 55 Terrence Melton OLB; 51 Anthony Schlegel MLB; 52 Odell Thurman OLB; Defensive backs: 31 Willie Andrews SS; 35 Fakhir Brown CB; 23 Jerome Carter FS; 36 Michael Grant CB; 28 Dexter Jackson FS; 20 Ricky Manning CB; 30 Derrick Richardson SS; 27 DeJuan Tribble CB; 24 Darius Vinnett CB	Special teams: 3 Matt Bryant K; 57 Matt Overton LS; 10 Todd Sauerbrun P; Reserve lists: 19 Chas Gessner WR (IR); 62 Gene Mruczkowski C (IR); rookies in italics 52 Active, 2 Inactive

== Schedule ==
=== Regular season ===
Round	Date	Opponent	Result	Record	Venue	Attendance
1	October 10	New York Sentinels	W 35–13	1–0	Citrus Bowl	11,203
2	October 14	at Las Vegas Locomotives	W 29–15	2–0	Sam Boyd Stadium	12,160
3	October 22	California Redwoods	W 34–7	3–0	Citrus Bowl	12,021
4	October 30	Las Vegas Locomotives	W 27–24	4–0	Tropicana Field	11,354
5	Bye					
6	November 12	at New York Sentinels	W 24–6	5–0	Rentschler Field	5,201
7	November 19	at California Redwoods	W 34–27	6–0	AT&T Park	6,837

=== Championship Game ===
Round	Date	Opponent	Result	Record	Venue	Attendance
Championship	November 27	Las Vegas Locomotives	L 17–20 (OT)	0–1	Sam Boyd Stadium	14,801

== Standings ==
United Football League
	W	L	T	PCT	PF	PA	STK
y-Florida Tuskers	6	0	0	1.000	183	92	W6
y-Las Vegas Locomotives	4	2	0	.667	167	100	W3
California Redwoods	2	4	0	.333	105	134	L2
New York Sentinels	0	6	0	.000	56	185	L6

y-denotes team advanced to 2009 UFL championship game

== Game summaries ==
=== Week 1: vs. New York Sentinels ===
Quarter	1	2	3	4	Total
Sentinels	7	6	0	0	13
Tuskers	0	14	14	7	35

at Citrus Bowl, Orlando, Florida

- Date: Saturday, October 10, 2009
- Game time: 7:00 p.m. ET
- Game attendance: 11,203
- Referee: Randy Christal
- TV announcers (HDNet): Kenny Rice & Paul Maguire
- Recap

Game information

1st quarter

- NY – Craphonso Thorpe 11-yard pass from Quinn Gray (Piotr Czech kick), 12:52

2nd quarter

- NY – Piotr Czech 32-yard field goal, 15:00
- FL – Frank Murphy 9-yard pass from Brooks Bollinger (Matt Bryant kick), 3:54
- FL – Taye Biddle 35-yard pass from Brooks Bollinger (Matt Bryant kick), 2:52
- NY – Piotr Czech 42-yard field goal, 0:13

3rd quarter

- FL – Chas Gessner 16-yard pass from Brooks Bollinger (Matt Bryant kick), 9:58
- FL – Ryan Neufeld 1-yard pass from Brooks Bollinger (Matt Bryant kick), 6:30

4th quarter

- FL – Tatum Bell 1-yard run (Matt Bryant kick), 11:55

Passing

- NY – Quinn Gray – 12/29, 161 yards, 1 TD, 1 INT
- FL – Brooks Bollinger – 20/26, 225 yards, 4 TD, 1 INT

Rushing

- NY – LaBrandon Toefield – 10 att, 34 yards
- FL – Tatum Bell – 15 att, 70 yards, 1 TD

Receiving

- NY – Craphonso Thorpe – 4 rec, 77 yards, 1 TD
- FL – Chas Gessner – 4 rec, 59 yards, 1 TD

The Tuskers opened the season with a convincing 35–13 win over the New York Sentinels. Quarterback Brooks Bollinger threw for 225 yards and four touchdowns.

=== Week 2: at Las Vegas Locomotives ===
Quarter	1	2	3	4	Total
Tuskers	7	9	6	7	29
Locomotives	0	0	0	15	15

at Sam Boyd Stadium, Whitney, Nevada

- Game time: 9:08 p.m. ET
- Game attendance: 12,160
- Referee: Dave Cutaia
- TV: Versus
- Recap

Game information

1st quarter

- FL – Frank Murphy 5-yard pass from Brooks Bollinger (Matt Bryant kick), 11:11

2nd quarter

- FL – Matt Bryant 22-yard field goal, 11:02
- FL – Matt Bryant 41-yard field goal, 1:51
- FL – Matt Bryant 30-yard field goal, 0:05

3rd quarter

- FL – Chas Gessner 12-yard pass from Brooks Bollinger (Matt Bryant kick), 4:33

4th quarter

- LV – DeDe Dorsey safety, 14:20
- FL – Taye Biddle 17-yard pass from Brooks Bollinger (Matt Bryant kick), 9:39
- LV – Samie Parker 11-yard pass from J. P. Losman (DeDe Dorsey rush failed), 7:10
- LV – Samie Parker 2-yard pass from J. P. Losman (Graham Gano kick), 1:56

Passing

- FL – Brooks Bollinger – 24/32, 310 yards, 3 TD
- LV – J. P. Losman – 19/35, 239 yards, 2 TD, 1 INT

Rushing

- FL – Tatum Bell – 11 att, 53 yards
- LV – Marcel Shipp – 10 att, 39 yards

Receiving

- FL – Taye Biddle – 7 rec, 107 yards, 1 TD
- LV – Samie Parker – 6 rec, 85 yards, 2 TD

On the road, Bollinger would surpass his total from a week before with 310 yards. Through the first three quarters, the Tuskers had kept the Las Vegas Locomotives from scoring, and led by 22 points. Kicker Matt Bryant connected on three field goals in the game, won by the Tuskers 29–15. With the win, the Tuskers moved into first place by themselves.

=== Week 3: vs. California Redwoods ===
Quarter	1	2	3	4	Total
Redwoods	0	0	0	7	7
Tuskers	0	17	10	7	34

at Citrus Bowl, Orlando, Florida

- Game time: 7:00 p.m. EDT
- Game attendance: 12,021
- Referee: Randy Christal
- TV: Versus
- Recap

Back in Orlando for Week 3, the Tuskers routed the California Redwoods 34–7, and improved to 3–0 on the season. The Tusker defense held the Redwoods to only 196 yards and forced five turnovers, including four interceptions. Taye Biddle was the Tuskers' leading receiver with 133 yards on five receptions, however no touchdowns.

=== Week 4: vs. Las Vegas Locomotives ===
Quarter	1	2	3	4	Total
Locomotives	0	14	3	7	24
Tuskers	0	7	10	10	27

at Tropicana Field, St. Petersburg, Florida

- Date: Friday, October 30, 2009
- Game time: 7:00 p.m. ET
- Game attendance: 11,354
- Referee: Dave Cutaia
- TV announcers (HDNet): Kenny Rice & Paul Maguire
- Recap

Game information

2nd quarter

- FL – Marcus Maxwell 9-yard pass from Brooks Bollinger (Matt Bryant kick), 11:54
- LV – Tab Perry 60-yard pass from J. P. Losman (Graham Gano kick), 5:11
- LV – DeDe Dorsey 22-yard run (Graham Gano kick), 2:46

3rd quarter

- FL – Marcus Maxwell 46-yard pass from Brooks Bollinger (Matt Bryant kick), 12:04
- LV – Graham Gano 40-yard field goal, 9:01
- FL – Matt Bryant 31-yard field goal, 4:51

4th quarter

- FL – Tatum Bell 1-yard run (Matt Bryant kick), 8:10
- LV – John Madsen 2-yard pass from J. P. Losman (Graham Gano kick), 7:01
- FL – Matt Bryant 40-yard field goal, 4:38

Passing

- LV – J. P. Losman – 19/31, 252 yards, 2 TD, 1 INT
- FL – Brooks Bollinger – 22/35, 323 yards, 2 TD, 1 INT

Rushing

- LV – DeDe Dorsey – 12 att, 139 yards, 1 TD
- FL – Tatum Bell – 20 att, 65 yards, 1 TD

Receiving

- LV – Tab Perry – 3 rec, 96 yards, 1 TD
- FL – Jayson Foster – 4 rec, 93 yards

The Tuskers traveled to their secondary home stadium for Week 4, Tropicana Field, normally known as the home to the Tampa Bay Rays of Major League Baseball. The Tuskers hosted the Locomotives, who were coming off of their bye week and facing the Tuskers in their second consecutive game. In contrast to the teams' previous game, the game was tied at 24–24 late in the 4th quarter. Matt Bryant nailed a 40-yard field goal to give the Tuskers the lead with 4:38 to play. Las Vegas would get the ball back with just under two minutes left, but Florida's defense held strong and the Tuskers remained undefeated with their fourth win of the season. With the victory, the Tuskers clinched a spot in the 2009 UFL Championship Game.

=== Week 6: at New York Sentinels ===
Quarter	1	2	3	4	Total
Tuskers	10	0	7	7	24
Sentinels	3	3	0	0	6

at Rentschler Field, Hartford, Connecticut

- Game time: 7:00 p.m. EDT
- Game attendance: 5,201
- Referee: Randy Christal
- TV: Versus
- Recap

Coming off of their bye week, the Tuskers were on the road against the Sentinels in Week 6. The game was close in the 1st half, with the Tuskers holding a slight 10–6 lead at halftime. However, the Tuskers defense kept New York out of the end zone the entire night. Also behind Brooks Bollinger's arm, throwing for 215 yards and two touchdowns, the Tuskers won 24–6, keeping the undefeated season alive at 5–0.

=== Week 7: at California Redwoods ===
Quarter	1	2	3	4	Total
Tuskers	10	10	0	14	34
Redwoods	10	14	3	0	27

at AT&T Park, San Francisco, California

- Game time: 9:08 p.m. EDT
- Game attendance: 6,837
- Referee: Dave Cutaia
- TV: Versus
- Recap

In Week 7, the Tuskers played their final game of the regular season in California. After both of the Tuskers' first two scores in the first quarter, they boldly attempted an onside kick and successfully recovered both. In the 1st quarter, both teams traded a field goal and a touchdown, but the Tuskers were down at halftime 24–20. After that, the Tuskers defense stood tall as they had in the previous week, only allowing a 3rd-quarter field goal in the entire 2nd half. Still down 27–20, Brooks Bollinger put together a 67-yard drive capped off by a touchdown pass to Jayson Foster on the first play of the 4th quarter. Foster was drilled by a Redwoods defensive player immediately after making the catch, but Foster held on to the ball for the score to tie the game. Later in the 4th quarter, California moved the ball to the Tuskers' 33-yard line, but cornerback Darius Vinnett intercepted the ball for the Tuskers and returned it 58 yards to the Redwoods' 8-yard line. A few plays later, running back Michael Pittman dove over the goal line for the touchdown, putting the Tuskers ahead 34–27. The Redwoods would punt the ball back to Florida on the ensuing drive, and with a chance to ice the game on 3rd down with only a yard needed for the 1st down, Pittman fumbled, and California came up with the ball. However, the Redwoods were unable to capitalize on the turnover, as Josh Cooper recovered his own forced fumble on Redwoods quarterback Shane Boyd, sealing the win for the Tuskers. The game was considered as one of the most entertaining of the season. The Tuskers remained undefeated at the conclusion of the regular season, finishing with a 6–0 record going into the championship game against Las Vegas.

== Championship Game ==
Quarter	1	2	3	4	OT	Total
Locomotives	0	3	0	14	3	20
Tuskers	7	0	0	10	0	17

at Sam Boyd Stadium, Whitney, Nevada

- Game time: 3:13 p.m. EDT
- Game attendance: 14,801
- Referee: Dave Cutaia
- TV: Versus
- Recap

Though it was announced as the location of the championship game before the two teams clinched a spot, the Tuskers traveled back to Las Vegas to play the Locomotives at Sam Boyd Stadium, attempting to beat them for the third time in the season. It was a defensive battle through the first three quarters, until both teams' offenses came alive in the fourth quarter. Tied with 17 points each at the end of regulation, the game went to overtime, the first overtime game in league history. The Tuskers won the coin toss and received the ball first in OT, but Brooks Bollinger threw an interception deep in Tuskers territory. The Locos ran one play to line the ball in between the goal posts, and kicker Graham Gano made the game-winning field goal just inside the right upright to win the championship for Las Vegas, and end the Tuskers' chance at a perfect season.
