= Jason Capizzi =

American football player (born 1983)

No. 73, 70
- Position: Offensive tackle

Personal information
- Born: June 19, 1983 (age 43); Gibsonia, Pennsylvania, U.S.
- Listed height: 6 ft 9 in (2.06 m)
- Listed weight: 315 lb (143 kg)

Career information
- High school: Pine-Richland (Gibsonia)
- College: Pittsburgh (2002); IUP (2003–2006)
- NFL draft: 2007: undrafted

Career history
- Pittsburgh Steelers (2007)*; New York Jets (2007)*; Tampa Bay Buccaneers (2007)*; Kansas City Chiefs (2007)*; Pittsburgh Steelers (2008)*; St. Louis Rams (2008)*; Pittsburgh Steelers (2008); Las Vegas Locomotives (2009); Cleveland Browns (2009)*; Carolina Panthers (2010)*; Las Vegas Locomotives (2010–2011)
- * Offseason or practice squad member only

Awards and highlights
- Super Bowl champion (XLIII); 2× UFL champion (2009, 2010); First-team All-American (2006)

Jason Capizzi (born June 19, 1983) is an American former professional football offensive tackle. He was signed by the Pittsburgh Steelers as an undrafted free agent in 2007. Capizzi won Super Bowl XLIII with the Steelers. He played college football at Indiana University of Pennsylvania.

Capizzi was also a member of the New York Jets, Tampa Bay Buccaneers, Kansas City Chiefs, St. Louis Rams, Cleveland Browns, and Carolina Panthers of the NFL, and the Las Vegas Locomotives of the United Football League (UFL).

== Early life ==
Jason Capizzi was born on June 19, 1983, in Gibsonia, Pennsylvania. He played high school football at Pine-Richland High School in Gibsonia, where he was a three-year starter at offensive tackle and also a starter at defensive tackle his senior year. He earned Pittsburgh Post-Gazette all-area, first-team All-Greater Allegheny Conference, and PrepStar All-East Region honors as a senior. He was also named one of the top 100 offensive line prospects in the country by Rivals100.com.

== College career ==
Capizzi joined the Pittsburgh Panthers of the University of Pittsburgh in 2002 and sat out the season as a redshirt.

In 2003, he transferred to the Indiana University of Pennsylvania to play for the IUP Indians. He had to sit out the 2003 season due to NCAA transfer rules. He started all 10 games at tackle in 2004, garnering second-team All-Pennsylvania State Athletic Conference (PSAC) West and D2Football.com second-team All-Northeast Region recognition. Capizzi started all 10 games at tackle for the second consecutive year in 2005 and was named second-team All-PSAC West once again. He started 10 games again his senior year in 2006, earning American Football Coaches Association and Daktronics Division II first team All-American, Associated Press second-team Little All-America, and first-team All-PSAC West accolades.

Capizzzi only gave up one sack in 30 total games during his college career. He majored in criminology at IUP.

== Professional career ==
After going undrafted in the 2007 NFL draft, Capizzi signed with the Pittsburgh Steelers on May 7, 2007. He was waived on September 1, 2007.

Capizzi was signed to the practice squad of the New York Jets on September 12, 2007, and was waived five days later on September 17.

He was signed to the practice squad of the Tampa Bay Buccaneers on September 26, 2007. He was waived on October 2 and re-signed to the practice squad the next day before being waived again on October 4.

Capizzi was signed to the Kansas City Chiefs' practice squad on November 8, 2007. He became a free agent after the season.

Capizzi signed with the Steelers on January 2, 2008. During the Steelers' 2008 training camp, he stress fractured his left foot. He was subsequently placed on season-ending injured reserve. He was waived with an injury settlement on August 4.

Capizzi was signed to the practice squad of the St. Louis Rams on October 28, 2008.

The Steelers signed Capizzi to their active roster off the Rams' practice squad on December 23, 2008, after offensive tackle Marvel Smith was placed on injured reserve. Capizzi was on the team's active roster when they won Super Bowl XLIII on February 1, 2009, but did not play in a regular season or postseason game that year. He was released by the Steelers on September 5, 2009.

Capizzi started all six games for the Las Vegas Locomotives of the United Football League (UFL) during the 2009 UFL season. On November 27, 2009, the Locomotives won the 2009 UFL championship game against the Florida Tuskers by a score of 20–17.

Capizzi was signed to the Cleveland Browns' practice squad on December 15, 2009. He re-signed with the Browns on January 4, 2010, but was later released on June 17, 2010.

He signed with the Carolina Panthers on August 9, 2010, and was released on August 25, 2010.

Capizzi played in all eight games, no starts, for the Locomotives during the 2010 UFL season. On November 27, 2010, the Locomotives won the 2010 UFL championship game against the Tuskers by a score of 23–20. He was also a member of the Locomotives in 2011 but did not appear in any games.
