= Marcus Riley =

American football player (born 1985)

No. 55, 57
- Position: Linebacker

Personal information
- Born: April 14, 1985 (age 41); Sacramento, California, U.S.
- Listed height: 6 ft 0 in (1.83 m)
- Listed weight: 230 lb (104 kg)

Career information
- College: Fresno State
- NFL draft: 2008: undrafted

Career history
- Green Bay Packers (2008)*; St. Louis Rams (2008)*; Chicago Bears (2008–2009)*; Las Vegas Locomotives (2009–2011)
- * Offseason or practice squad member only

Awards and highlights
- 2× UFL champion (2009, 2010); WAC Defensive Player of The Year (2007); First-team All-WAC (2007)

Marcus Riley (born April 14, 1985) is an American former football linebacker. He was signed by the Green Bay Packers as an undrafted free agent in 2008. He played college football at Fresno State.

Riley was also a member of the St. Louis Rams, Chicago Bears, and Las Vegas Locomotives.

Pre-draft measurables
Height	Weight	40-yard dash	10-yard split	20-yard split	20-yard shuttle	Three-cone drill	Vertical jump	Broad jump	Bench press
5 ft 11 5/8 in (1.82 m)	224 lb (102 kg)	4.66 s	1.59 s	2.68 s	4.33 s	7.10 s	33.0 in (0.84 m)	9 ft 7 in (2.92 m)	20 reps
All values from Pro Day

== Personal ==
Riley is a cousin of former NFL wide receiver Henry Ellard.
