= Adam Bergen =

American football player (born 1983)

No. 89, 87
- Position: Tight end

Personal information
- Born: September 3, 1983 (age 43); Seaford, New York, U.S.
- Listed height: 6 ft 4 in (1.93 m)
- Listed weight: 267 lb (121 kg)

Career information
- High school: Seaford
- College: Lehigh
- NFL draft: 2005: undrafted

Career history
- Arizona Cardinals (2005–2006); Dallas Cowboys (2007)*; Baltimore Ravens (2008)*; Denver Broncos (2009)*; Las Vegas Locomotives (2009–2011)
- * Offseason or practice squad member only

Awards and highlights
- 2× UFL champion (2009, 2010)

Career NFL statistics
- Receptions: 43
- Receiving yards: 381
- Receiving touchdowns: 2
- Stats at Pro Football Reference

Adam James Bergen (born September 3, 1983) is an American former professional football player who was a tight end in the National Football League (NFL). He was signed by the Arizona Cardinals as an undrafted free agent in 2005. He played college football for the Lehigh Mountain Hawks.

Bergen was also a member of the Dallas Cowboys, Baltimore Ravens, Denver Broncos, and Las Vegas Locomotives.

== Professional career ==
=== Arizona Cardinals ===
Undrafted in the 2005 NFL draft, Bergen signed with the Arizona Cardinals as an undrafted free agent. In 2005, he played in all 16 games the Cardinals that year, starting nine, and caught 28 passes for 270 yards and one touchdown.

In 2006, he played in 14 games, starting seven, and caught 15 passes for 111 yards and one touchdown. He was placed on the IR after week 14 due to a knee injury.

=== Dallas Cowboys ===
In the 2007 offseason, Bergen signed with the Dallas Cowboys. He was released on September 1 prior to the regular season and spent the year out of football.

=== Baltimore Ravens ===
On July 22, 2008, Bergen was signed by the Baltimore Ravens. He was released on August 30, 2008.

=== Denver Broncos ===
Bergen was signed to a future contract by the Denver Broncos on January 9, 2009. He was released on April 28, 2009.

=== Las Vegas Locomotives ===
Bergen was signed by the Las Vegas Locomotives of the United Football League on August 5, 2009.
