= Joe Porter (American football) =

American football player (born 1985)

No. 40, 20, 28
- Position: Cornerback

Personal information
- Born: November 27, 1985 (age 40); Summit, New Jersey, U.S.
- Listed height: 5 ft 10 in (1.78 m)
- Listed weight: 197 lb (89 kg)

Career information
- College: Rutgers
- NFL draft: 2007: undrafted

Career history
- New Orleans Saints (2007)*; Green Bay Packers (2007–2008); Las Vegas Locomotives (2009); Cleveland Browns (2009)*; Oakland Raiders (2010–2011)
- * Offseason or practice squad member only

Awards and highlights
- UFL champion (2009)

Career NFL statistics
- Total tackles: 10
- Stats at Pro Football Reference

Joseph Issac Porter (born November 27, 1985) is an American former professional football player who was a cornerback in the National Football League (NFL). He was signed by the New Orleans Saints as an undrafted free agent in 2007. He played college football for the Rutgers Scarlet Knights.

Born in Summit, New Jersey, Porter grew up in Franklin Township, Somerset County, New Jersey and played high school football at Franklin High School.

Porter has also played for the Green Bay Packers, Las Vegas Locomotives, Cleveland Browns and Oakland Raiders.

== Oakland Raiders ==
Porter signed with the Oakland Raiders on January 4, 2011. He was waived by the Oakland Raiders on October 17, 2011.

== Personal life ==
Porter resides in New Jersey where he was a history teacher at Franklin High School in Franklin Township, New Jersey, where he also coached football and track & field. Today, he teaches for West Windsor-Plainsboro High School South.
