= Ezra Butler (American football) =

South African gridiron football player (born 1984)

No. 56, 59
- Position: Linebacker

Personal information
- Born: 20 November 1984 (age 41); Cape Town, South Africa
- Listed height: 6 ft 2 in (1.88 m)
- Listed weight: 248 lb (112 kg)

Career information
- High school: Calabasas (CA)
- College: Nevada
- NFL draft: 2008: undrafted

Career history
- San Francisco 49ers (2008)*; Las Vegas Locomotives (2009); New York Jets (2010)*; Las Vegas Locomotives (2010); New Orleans Saints (2010–2011); Toronto Argonauts (2014)
- * Offseason or practice squad member only

Awards and highlights
- 2× UFL champion (2009, 2010); First-team All-WAC (2006)
- Stats at Pro Football Reference

Ezra Butler (born 20 November 1984) is a former American football linebacker.

== Football career ==
Butler played college football at Nevada.

He was signed by the San Francisco 49ers as an undrafted free agent on 2008 and would later spend the 2009 season with the Las Vegas Locomotives.

Butler who had signed with the New York Jets in January 2010, was later waived by the team on 29 July 2010. He was waived by the Saints on 5 September 2011.

On 9 January 2014, Butler signed with the Toronto Argonauts of the Canadian Football League. On 21 May 2014, Butler was placed on the retired list.

On 7 October 2014, Butler was signed to a practice roster agreement with the Argonauts. On 4 November 2014, Butler was released by the Argonauts.

== Personal life ==
In 2008, he was arrested on misdemeanor charges of driving under the influence and possession of marijuana. He is now a defensive coach at West Hills High School in Santee, California. He is the son of Jonathan Butler, a two-time Grammy nominated guitarist, songwriter and music producer.
