= Brian Hernandez =

American gridiron football player (born 1984)

No. 18, 84
- Position: Wide receiver

Personal information
- Born: April 13, 1984 (age 42); Phoenix, Arizona, U.S.
- Listed height: 5 ft 11 in (1.80 m)
- Listed weight: 190 lb (86 kg)

Career information
- College: Utah
- NFL draft: 2008: undrafted

Career history
- Saskatchewan Roughriders (2008); Green Bay Blizzard (2009); Las Vegas Locomotives (2009–2010); Washington Redskins (2012)*; Philadelphia Eagles (2012)*
- * Offseason or practice squad member only

Awards and highlights
- 2× UFL champion (2009, 2010)

Brian Julio Hernandez (born April 13, 1984) is an American former football wide receiver.

== College career ==
Hernandez played at Pima Community College in 2004. He played at the University of Utah. In the two seasons in Utah, he finished with 86 receptions, 1,133 receiving yards and 4 receiving touchdowns. In 2005, 39 receptions, 709 receiving yards and 3 receiving touchdowns. On October 15, 2005, he recorded 7 receptions and 148 receiving yards against San Diego State, but Utah lost 28–19.

== Professional career ==
=== Green Bay Blizzard ===
On September 24, 2009, Hernandez was signed by the Green Bay Blizzard.

=== Las Vegas Locomotives ===
In 2009, Hernandez signed with the Las Vegas Locomotives. For the 2010 season, he recorded 5 receptions and 55 receiving yards. He helped the Las Vegas Locomotives to win the UFL Championship for the second straight year.

=== Washington Redskins ===
On May 6, 2012, Hernandez signed with the Washington Redskins. On July 28, 2012, he was released by the team.

=== Philadelphia Eagles ===
On August 11, 2012, Hernandez signed with the Philadelphia Eagles. On September 5, 2012, he was released with an injury settlement.
