= Brandon Joyce =

American gridiron football player (1984–2010)

No. 76
- Position: Offensive tackle

Personal information
- Born: September 5, 1984; St. Louis, Missouri, U.S.
- Died: December 28, 2010 (aged 26); St. Charles, Missouri, U.S.
- Listed height: 6 ft 5 in (1.96 m)
- Listed weight: 317 lb (144 kg)

Career information
- College: Illinois State
- NFL draft: 2008: undrafted

Career history
- Minnesota Vikings (2008)*; Toronto Argonauts (2008); Las Vegas Locomotives (2009); St. Louis Rams (2010)*; Las Vegas Locomotives (2010)*
- * Offseason or practice squad member only

Awards and highlights
- UFL champion (2009)
- Stats at CFL.ca (archive)

Brandon Joyce (September 5, 1984 – December 28, 2010) was a gridiron football offensive tackle. He was the son of former NFL punter Terry Joyce.

Joyce was signed by the Minnesota Vikings as an undrafted free agent in 2008. He played college football at Illinois State. Joyce had also been a member of the Toronto Argonauts, Las Vegas Locomotives and St. Louis Rams. Joyce was shot during a robbery on December 24, 2010, and died in St. Charles, Missouri, at the age of 26, after several days on a life support machine.
