= Gabe Long =

American football player (born 1985)

No. 99
- Position: Defensive tackle

Personal information
- Born: January 3, 1985 (age 41); Yorba Linda, California, U.S.
- Listed height: 6 ft 3 in (1.91 m)
- Listed weight: 290 lb (132 kg)

Career information
- College: Utah
- NFL draft: 2008: undrafted

Career history
- Houston Texans (2008)*; Las Vegas Locomotives (2009–2010); Utah Blaze (2011); Chicago Rush (2012)
- * Offseason or practice squad member only

Awards and highlights
- UFL champion (2009); Second-team All-MW (2007)

Gabe Long (born January 3, 1985) is a former American football defensive tackle. He was signed by the Houston Texans as an undrafted free agent in 2008. He played college football at Utah.

Long also played for the Las Vegas Locomotives, Utah Blaze and Chicago Rush.

== Professional career ==
=== Houston Texans ===
Long was signed by the Houston Texans as an undrafted free agent on May 8, 2008. The Texans' signed him to the practice squad on September 3. He was released from the practice squad on September 15. Houston re-signed him to the team on November 19.
