= Ronnie Palmer =

American football player (born 1986)

No. 54, 52
- Position: Linebacker

Personal information
- Born: March 29, 1986 (age 40); Spring, Texas, U.S.
- Listed height: 6 ft 3 in (1.91 m)
- Listed weight: 245 lb (111 kg)

Career information
- College: Arizona
- NFL draft: 2009: undrafted

Career history
- Washington Redskins (2009)*; Las Vegas Locomotives (2009–2010); Sacramento Mountain Lions (2010–2011)
- * Offseason or practice squad member only

Awards and highlights
- UFL champion (2009)

Ronnie Renor Palmer, Jr. (born March 29, 1986) is an American former professional football linebacker. He was signed by the Washington Redskins as an undrafted free agent in 2009. He played college football at Arizona.

Palmer also played for the Las Vegas Locomotives and Sacramento Mountain Lions of the United Football League (UFL).

== College career ==
Palmer finished his career at Arizona with 267 tackles, 3 sacks and 3 interceptions.

== Professional career ==
=== Washington Redskins ===
Palmer was signed by the Washington Redskins as an undrafted free agent on 2009, but was later waived.

=== Las Vegas Locomotives ===
Palmer signed with the Las Vegas Locomotives of the United Football League on August 5, 2009. He was released on September 14, 2010.
