= Frank Davis (American football) =

American football player (born 1981)

No. 61, 53
- Position: Guard

Personal information
- Born: August 22, 1981 (age 45); New York City, New York, U.S.
- Listed height: 6 ft 4 in (1.93 m)
- Listed weight: 326 lb (148 kg)

Career information
- College: South Florida
- NFL draft: 2006: undrafted

Career history
- Detroit Lions (2006–2007); Cincinnati Bengals (2008); Las Vegas Locomotives (2009–2011)

Awards and highlights
- 2× UFL champion (2009, 2010); Second-team All-Big East (2005)

Career NFL statistics
- Games played: 11
- Games started: 3
- Stats at Pro Football Reference

Frank Davis (born August 22, 1981) is a former gridiron football guard. He was signed by the Detroit Lions as an undrafted free agent in 2006. He played college football for the South Florida Bulls.

Davis was also a member of the Cincinnati Bengals and Las Vegas Locomotives.

== Early life ==
He grew up in Panama and speaks Spanish as a first language. In Panama, he played varsity football for the Jaguars F.C. and doubled as an offensive and defensive lineman. Davis played on the Panamanian under-19 national team at the 2000 NFL Global Junior Championship in Atlanta, Ga. The NFL Global Junior Championship has been an official Super Bowl event for the past 10 years. Here he drew the attention of a Panamanian football coach, Guillermo Suarez. Who recruited Frank to play for the Panama Raptors Football team. Suarez became Davis' godfather and helped set him up at the University of South Florida in Tampa.

== College career ==
Following his participation in the 2000 NFL Global Junior Championship, he was recruited by University of South Florida, and was offered an opportunity to join the Bulls' football program. Davis entered the program as a defensive lineman but was quickly converted to the offensive line.

As a redshirt freshman in 2002, Davis played in nine games at left guard and left tackle and had one start that season. As a sophomore, he started five games at left guard, including the final four of the 2003 season. During his junior year, Davis started the first six games until an ankle injury sidelined him until he returned for the final game in 2004.

As a senior, Davis was named second-team All-Big East after starting all 12 games (11 at left guard and one at left tackle). In back-to-back seasons, he was a main piece to a strong rushing attack. Davis helped pave the way for RB Andre Hall to set school single-season rushing records in 2004 and 2005, as well as the school's career rushing record.

== Professional career ==
=== Detroit Lions ===
Davis was signed by the Detroit Lions following the 2006 NFL draft, where he went undrafted. Davis surprised many people by earning his way onto the Lions roster out of training camp. Davis played in eleven games, with three starts in 2006. His 2007 season was over before it started as he was placed on IR on September 2, 2007. He was waived by the team on August 30, 2008, during final cuts.

=== Cincinnati Bengals ===
A day after being let go by the Lions, Davis was claimed off waivers by the Cincinnati Bengals on August 31, 2008. He was inactive for the first two games of the season and waived on September 16.

=== Las Vegas Locomotives ===
Davis signed with the Las Vegas Locomotives of the United Football League on August 5, 2009.
