= Quinton Culberson =

American gridiron football player (born 1985)

No. 53, 56, 54
- Position: Linebacker

Personal information
- Born: October 21, 1985 (age 41); Jackson, Mississippi, U.S.
- Listed height: 6 ft 1 in (1.85 m)
- Listed weight: 240 lb (109 kg)

Career information
- College: Mississippi State
- NFL draft: 2007: undrafted

Career history
- St. Louis Rams (2007–2009); Florida Tuskers (2009); Carolina Panthers (2009); Edmonton Eskimos (2011)

Awards and highlights
- First-team All-SEC (2006)

Career NFL statistics
- Total tackles: 94
- Forced fumbles: 2
- Fumble recoveries: 1
- Stats at Pro Football Reference

Quinton Culberson (born October 21, 1985) is an American former professional football player who was a linebacker for the Carolina Panthers of the National Football League (NFL). He played college football for the Mississippi State Bulldogs and was signed by the St. Louis Rams as an undrafted free agent in 2007. Culberson has also played for the Florida Tuskers.

== Early life ==
As a high school senior at Provine High School in Jackson, Mississippi, he was named the Jackson Clarion-Ledger's 2002 Metro-Area (Hinds, Rankin, and Madison counties) Football Player of the Year. He was also first-team All-State selection as a senior after recording 64 tackles, three interceptions and two fumble recoveries. He also saw action on offense, totaling 22 catches for 430 yards and 10 touchdowns. Culberson also starred in track and was the Mississippi Class 4A state champion high jumper, with a personal best of 6’10".

== College career ==
Culberson attended Mississippi State University and was a four-year starter, starting at cornerback as a freshman and playing some safety before adding significant size to his frame to help facilitate a move to linebacker. He finished his college career with 42 games played (36 starts), 278 tackles, 13.5 tackles for loss, 2.0 sacks, four interceptions, 13 passes defensed, four forced fumbles. He began his career at Mississippi State as a cornerback before moving to linebacker. He was first-team All-Southeastern Conference as a senior after leading the Bulldogs with 102 tackles. As a junior, he had 78 tackles, which also led the team. Began sophomore season as reserve safety before moving to linebacker and he started the final five games of the season as outside linebacker, registering 56 tackles and a 35-yard interception return for a touchdown. Culberson was named Freshman All-SEC by The Sporting News and league’s coaches and started at cornerback in first eight games of season before suffering a broken leg. He totaled 42 tackles and a team-leading six passes defensed. He was the first true freshman to start for the Bulldogs since 1986.

== Professional career ==
=== Pre-draft ===
Pre-draft measurables
Height	Weight	40-yard dash	Vertical jump	Broad jump	Bench press
6 ft 1 in (1.85 m)	236 lb (107 kg)	4.77 s	29 1/2 in (0.75 m)	9 ft 5 in (2.87 m)	18 reps
All values from NFL Combine.

=== St. Louis Rams ===
On May 3, 2007, Culberson signed as an undrafted rookie free agent to a rookie minimum ($285,000) contract by the St. Louis Rams. He was the only undrafted rookie to make Rams opening day roster in 2007. In 2007, Culberson played 14 games with one start, and he recorded 24 tackles with forced two fumbles, playing mostly on special teams. On January 25, 2008, Culberson signed a contract extension that paid him $375,000 in 2008. In 2008, he played 16 games with ten starts. He had 44 tackles and knocked away 2 passes.

Following the signing of Paris Lenon, the Rams waived Culberson on September 16, 2009.

=== Carolina Panthers ===
Culberson was signed by the Carolina Panthers on December 2, 2009.

=== Edmonton Eskimos ===
Culberson signed with the Edmonton Eskimos of the CFL on March 10, 2011.
