= T. J. Wright =

American football player (born 1983)

No. 3
- Position: Cornerback

Personal information
- Born: November 29, 1983 (age 42); Webster, Texas, U.S.
- Listed height: 5 ft 10 in (1.78 m)
- Listed weight: 123 lb (56 kg)

Career information
- College: Ohio
- NFL draft: 2007: undrafted

Career history
- Cincinnati Bengals (2007); Florida Tuskers (2009); Jacksonville Sharks (2012)

Awards and highlights
- First-team All-MAC; Top 2 DBs MAC Conference; Top 30 Best Football Players; regardless position; Invented Locator1 one button wireless paging system for mobile

T. J. Wright (born November 29, 1983) is an American former football cornerback. He was signed by the Cincinnati Bengals as an undrafted free agent in 2007. He played college football at Ohio.

He was also a member of the Florida Tuskers and Jacksonville Sharks.

== Early life ==
Wright was an All-District, All-State cornerback at Clifton J. Ozen Magnet High School Beaumont, Texas. Wright was named most athletic his senior year after being a 4 sport varsity athlete. Wright also began recording at the local Parkdale mall as well as designing T-shirts for the local group then known as S.T.Y.

== College career ==
As a senior with the Ohio Bobcats, Wright started all 14 games and earned first-team All-MAC honors from the league's coaches. He was, also, named All-MAC by Collegefootballnews.com, which rated him as the second-best defensive back in the league and one of the top 30 best football players regardless of position. Wright was named MAC East Division Player of the Week after recording seven tackles, two pass break-ups, a forced fumble and a fumble recovery at Miami. He led all Ohio defensive backs, and ranked third on the team overall, with 59 tackles. He ranked first on the team with four interceptions and was the first Bobcat since Bop White (1999–2002) to notch four straight seasons with at least three interceptions. In his senior season, Wright helped lead the Bobcats to a MAC East Division title, a MAC Championship Game appearance, a GMAC Bowl appearance and accepted an invitation to play in the inaugural Texas vs The Nation All-Star game in El Paso, TX.

== Professional career ==
=== Cincinnati Bengals ===
Wright was signed by the Bengals as an undrafted free agent on April 30, 2007. He was released on November 12, 2007.

=== Florida Tuskers ===
Wright was drafted by the Florida Tuskers of the United Football League in the UFL Premiere Season Draft in 2009. He signed with the team on August 17.
