= Josh Savage =

American football player (born 1980)

No. 97, 93, 73, 95
- Position: Defensive end

Personal information
- Born: September 28, 1980 (age 46); Ozark, Alabama, U.S.
- Listed height: 6 ft 4 in (1.93 m)
- Listed weight: 276 lb (125 kg)

Career information
- College: Utah
- NFL draft: 2004: undrafted

Career history
- Tampa Bay Buccaneers (2004); Atlanta Falcons (2005); Tennessee Titans (2006); New Orleans Saints (2007–2008); Florida Tuskers (2009); Omaha Nighthawks (2010); Sacramento Mountain Lions (2010–2011)

Awards and highlights
- First-team All-MW (2003)

Career NFL statistics
- Games played: 16
- Total tackles: 7
- Stats at Pro Football Reference

Josh Joel Savage (born September 28, 1980) is an American former professional football player who was a defensive end in the National Football League (NFL). He played college football for the Utah Utes and was signed as an undrafted free agent by the Tampa Bay Buccaneers in 2004.

Savage also played for the Atlanta Falcons, Tennessee Titans, New Orleans Saints, Florida Tuskers and Omaha Nighthawks.

== Early life ==
Savage was a Second-team All-State selection and team captain as a senior at Hillcrest High School (Salt Lake City, Utah), He had 8 sacks as that season. He lettered two years in basketball and football.

== College career ==
Savage was a three-year starter at defensive end for the Utes, played in 44 career games with 34 starts. He totaled 120 tackles, 20.5 tackles for loss and 12 sacks. In 2003, as senior, named First-team All-Mountain West after starting all 12 games with 47 tackles, seven tackles for loss, two sacks and nine passes defensed. As junior, was an honorable mention All-conference selection after starting all 11 games and totaling 29 tackles, 6.5 tackles for loss and six sacks. In 2001, he started 11 games at left end and played in all 12 games and had 36 total tackles, 7 for loss, 4 sacks and 3 pass breakups. In 2000 as a redshirt freshman he played in nine games and made 8 total tackles. In 1999, he was a redshirt.

== Professional career ==
=== Tampa Bay Buccaneers ===
Savage was signed as an undrafted free agent by the Tampa Bay Buccaneers in 2004. As a rookie, he played in five games for Buccaneers and posted two tackles for season.

=== Atlanta Falcons ===
In 2005, he saw action in one game for the Atlanta Falcons and was on the practice squad for 12 games.

=== Tennessee Titans ===
In 2006, Savage was claimed off waivers from Falcons on September 3 and played in five games in a reserve role. Posted career-high four tackles with one QB pressure. He was inactive 11 games.

=== New Orleans Saints ===
The Saints signed Savage in 2007 and he played in one game. In 2008, he played in three games and recorded 5 tackles. He was released by the Saints on May 19, 2009.

=== Florida Tuskers ===
Savage was signed by the Florida Tuskers of the United Football League on September 3, 2009.
