= Jim Haslett =

American football player and coach (born 1955)

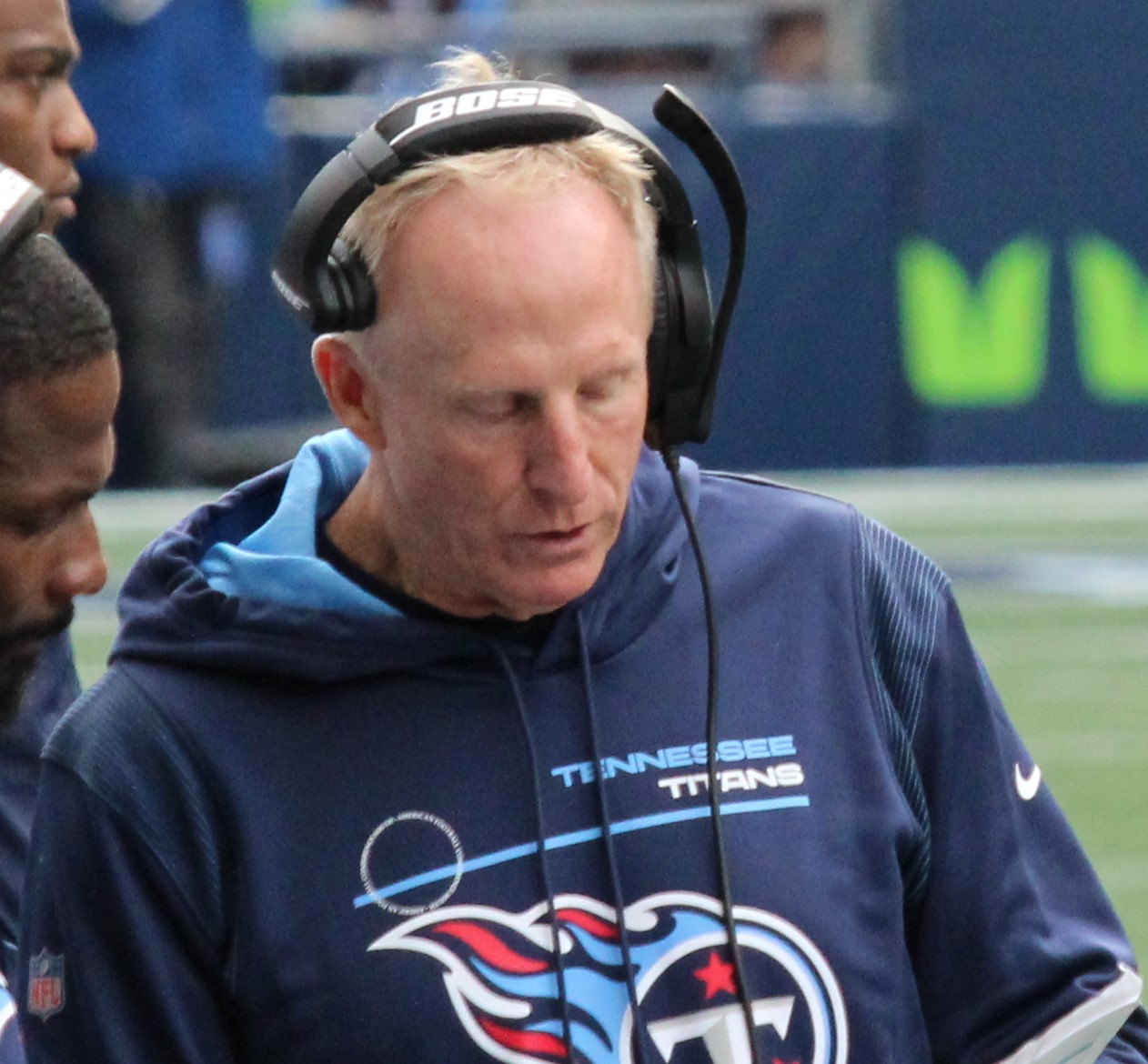
- Haslett with the Tennessee Titans in 2021

No. 55, 51
- Position: Linebacker

Personal information
- Born: December 9, 1955 (age 70); Pittsburgh, Pennsylvania, U.S.
- Listed height: 6 ft 3 in (1.91 m)
- Listed weight: 232 lb (105 kg)

Career information
- High school: Avalon
- College: IUP (1975–1978)
- NFL draft: 1979: 2nd round, 51st overall pick

Career history

Playing
- Buffalo Bills (1979–1985); New York Jets (1987)

Coaching
- Buffalo (1988) Linebackers coach; Buffalo (1989–1990) Defensive coordinator; Sacramento Surge (1991–1992) Defensive coordinator; Los Angeles Raiders (1993–1994) Linebackers coach; New Orleans Saints (1995) Linebackers coach; New Orleans Saints (1996) Defensive coordinator; Pittsburgh Steelers (1997–1999) Defensive coordinator; New Orleans Saints (2000–2005) Head coach; St. Louis Rams (2006–2008) Defensive coordinator; St. Louis Rams (2008) Interim head coach; Florida Tuskers (2009) Head coach; Washington Redskins (2010–2014) Defensive coordinator; Penn State (2015) Consultant; Cincinnati Bengals (2016–2018) Linebackers coach; Tennessee Titans (2020–2021) Inside linebackers coach; Seattle Sea Dragons (2023) Head coach

Awards and highlights
- AP NFL Coach of the Year (2000); NFL Defensive Rookie of the Year (1979); PFWA All-Rookie Team (1979)

Career NFL statistics
- Games: 94
- Sacks: 4.5
- Interceptions: 6
- Stats at Pro Football Reference

Head coaching record
- Regular season: NFL: 47–61 (.435); UFL: 6–0 (1.000); XFL: 7–3 (.700)
- Postseason: NFL: 1–1 (.500); UFL: 0–1 (.000); XFL: 0–1 (.000)
- Career: NFL: 48–62 (.436); UFL: 6–1 (.857); XFL: 7–4 (.636)
- Coaching profile at Pro Football Reference
- College Football Hall of Fame

James Donald Haslett (born December 9, 1955) is an American football coach and former linebacker who was most recently the head coach of the Seattle Sea Dragons of the XFL. He played college football for the IUP Big Indians before being drafted by the Buffalo Bills in the second round of the 1979 NFL draft; he went on to be named NFL Defensive Rookie of the Year.

Haslett's coaching career began in the late 1980s, with him rejoining the NFL by the mid-1990s. In 2000, he was hired as head coach of the New Orleans Saints and was named the NFL Coach of the Year. He has also served as head coach for the Florida Tuskers of the United Football League (UFL).

== Playing career ==
Haslett attended Indiana University of Pennsylvania, and was selected in the second round of the 1979 NFL draft by the Buffalo Bills. He was a linebacker for the Buffalo Bills through 1985; he broke his leg during a 1986 preseason contest, ending his time with the Bills. He made a brief comeback with the New York Jets in 1987. He was named the NFL Defensive Rookie of the Year for 1979. In a 2005 article in the Pittsburgh Post-Gazette, Haslett admitted to using steroids while playing for the Buffalo Bills. Haslett went on record saying that "everybody tried it" to gain a competitive advantage against opposing teams.

== Coaching career ==
=== Early coaching career ===
Haslett began his coaching career at the University at Buffalo in 1988 as a linebackers coach before being promoted to defensive coordinator in 1989. After three seasons with Buffalo, Haslett became the defensive coordinator for the Sacramento Surge of the World League of American Football for the team's inaugural season in 1991. The league suspended operations after the 1992 season.

=== NFL coaching career ===
Haslett began his NFL coaching career as a linebackers coach for the Los Angeles Raiders in 1993. After two seasons with the Raiders, Haslett was hired as linebackers coach for the New Orleans Saints. He was promoted to defensive coordinator for the 1996 season. After head coach Jim Mora quit during the season, Haslett was offered the interim head coach position, but he declined, and was not retained by new head coach Mike Ditka for the 1997 season.

Haslett was then hired as the defensive coordinator for the Pittsburgh Steelers, where he coached for three seasons from 1997 to 1999.

=== New Orleans Saints ===
In January 2000, Haslett was named head coach of the New Orleans Saints. He was reportedly hired to a three-year contract. That season, he guided the Saints to a 10–6 regular-season record, their second NFC West division championship, and the first playoff victory in franchise history (defeating the St. Louis Rams; they lost to the Minnesota Vikings the next week). As a result of the Saints' turnaround from their previous 3–13 season (under his predecessor, Mike Ditka), Haslett was named NFL Coach of the Year. This was the only playoff appearance in Haslett's six years in New Orleans. They would only notch one other winning record in 2002. That year, the Saints started 9–4, but three consecutive losses, including to the 1–13 Cincinnati Bengals, resulted in them missing the playoffs by a single game.

In 2005, the Saints crashed to a 3–13 record. The season was marred by Hurricane Katrina's devastation of New Orleans. This forced the franchise to temporarily relocate to San Antonio, playing three of their 'home' games in the Alamodome. Another four home games were played in Baton Rouge at LSU's Tiger Stadium, and one took place at Giants Stadium in New Jersey (against the New York Giants).

Haslett was fired after the 2005 season. He finished his six-year tenure as the head coach of the Saints with the second most head coaching wins in franchise history, with a regular season record of 45–51.

=== St. Louis Rams ===
Haslett became the St. Louis Rams' defensive coordinator to start the 2006 season. On September 29, 2008, Haslett was named the interim head coach of the Rams after Scott Linehan was fired. The Rams gave Haslett an interim coach's contract, containing a clause that promised him the permanent head coach's job if the team won at least six games that season. Within a few weeks, this clause was nullified by the NFL, because it violated the league's "Rooney Rule". He won his first game as interim head coach of the Rams with a 19–17 victory over the 4–1 Washington Redskins. That win was followed by a 34–14 drubbing of the Dallas Cowboys on October 19, 2008. This brought the Rams to a 2–4 record. The team would lose their final 10 games, leaving Haslett with an interim record of 2–10 on the year. On January 15, 2009, the Rams announced that Haslett was no longer in consideration for the permanent head coaching position and that the team would be going in a "new direction".

=== Florida Tuskers ===
Haslett coached the Florida Tuskers of the United Football League during its inaugural season in 2009. The team went 6–0 but were upset in the first-ever UFL Championship Game by the Las Vegas Locomotives. He won UFL Coach of Year in their inaugural season.

=== Washington Redskins ===
Haslett was hired as the Washington Redskins defensive coordinator on January 12, 2010, under head coach Mike Shanahan. Haslett replaced the retiring Greg Blache. After many speculated he would be fired after the disastrous 2013 season, new head coach Jay Gruden announced Haslett would remain on the team for the upcoming 2014 season. The move reunited the pair, as Gruden had worked as the offensive coordinator under Haslett for the Tuskers in the 2009 season. On December 31, 2014, the Redskins announced that Haslett would leave the Redskins by mutual agreement.

=== Cincinnati Bengals ===
After spending the 2015 season as a consultant for Penn State, Haslett was hired as the linebackers coach for the Cincinnati Bengals on January 15, 2016. Following the 2018 season, the Bengals chose not to retain Haslett along with several other assistant coaches after the firing of longtime head coach Marvin Lewis.

=== Tennessee Titans ===
On February 6, 2020, Tennessee Titans head coach Mike Vrabel hired Haslett as the team's inside linebackers coach. Haslett spent two years in the role. He was not retained after the 2021 season.

=== XFL ===
Haslett was announced as an XFL head coach in 2021, later revealed to be for the Seattle Sea Dragons. Due to the COVID-19 pandemic, the XFL ceased operations in 2021 and 2022. Haslett was the head coach of the Sea Dragons for their final season in 2023, guiding them to a 7–3 record before losing in the divisional round of the playoffs 37–21 to the DC Defenders.

On January 1, 2024, it was announced that the Sea Dragons would be disbanding. Eight teams from competing spring football leagues, the XFL and USFL, merged into the United Football League going into the 2024 season; the Sea Dragons were not one of the teams selected for the merger.

== Head coaching record ==
=== NFL ===
Team	Year	Regular season					Postseason			
Team	Year	Won	Lost	Ties	Win %	Finish	Won	Lost	Win %	Result
NO	2000	10	6	0	.625	1st in NFC West	1	1	.500	Lost to Minnesota Vikings in NFC Divisional Game
NO	2001	7	9	0	.438	3rd in NFC West	-	-	-	-
NO	2002	9	7	0	.563	3rd in NFC South	-	-	-	-
NO	2003	8	8	0	.500	2nd in NFC South	-	-	-	-
NO	2004	8	8	0	.500	2nd in NFC South	-	-	-	-
NO	2005	3	13	0	.188	4th in NFC South	-	-	-	-
NOR total		45	51	0	.469		1	1	.500	
STL	2008*	2	10	0	.167	4th in NFC West	-	-	-	-
STL total		2	10	0	.167		-	-	-	
Total		47	61	0	.435		1	1	.500	

*Interim head coach

=== UFL ===
Team	Year	Regular season				Postseason			
Team	Year	Won	Lost	Win %	Finish	Won	Lost	Win %	Result
FL	2009	6	0	1.000	1st in UFL	0	1	.000	Lost to Las Vegas Locomotives in 2009 UFL Championship Game
Total		6	0	1.000		0	1	.000	

=== XFL ===
Team	Year	Regular season				Postseason			
Team	Year	Won	Lost	Win %	Finish	Won	Lost	Win %	Result
SEA	2023	7	3	.700	2nd in XFL North	0	1	.000	Lost to DC Defenders in XFL North Division Championship
Total		7	3	.700		0	1	.000	
