= Enoka Lucas =

American football player (born 1984)

No. 58
- Position: Center

Personal information
- Born: April 29, 1984 (age 42); Honolulu, Hawaii, U.S.
- Listed height: 6 ft 3 in (1.91 m)
- Listed weight: 299 lb (136 kg)

Career information
- College: Oregon
- NFL draft: 2007: undrafted

Career history
- Houston Texans (2007)*; Tampa Bay Buccaneers (2007)*; Tennessee Titans (2008)*; Arizona Cardinals (2008)*; Florida Tuskers (2009–2010); Virginia Destroyers (2011)
- * Offseason or practice squad member only

Awards and highlights
- First-team All-Pac-10 (2006); Second-team All-Pac-10 (2005)

Enoka Lucas (born April 29, 1984) is an American former professional football player who was a center in the United Football League (UFL). He was signed by the Houston Texans of the National Football League (NFL) as an undrafted free agent in 2007. He played college football for the Oregon Ducks after graduating from Kamehameha Schools.

Lucas was also in the NFL with the Tampa Bay Buccaneers, Tennessee Titans and Arizona Cardinals.

== Professional career ==
=== Florida Tuskers ===
Lucas was signed by the Florida Tuskers of the United Football League on September 3, 2009. He was a part-time starter at center in 2009 before taking over the center job full-time in 2010 for Florida. He resigned with the Virginia Destroyers (formerly the Florida Tuskers) on June 21, 2011, for his third UFL season.
