= United Bowl =

United Bowl may refer to:

- United Bowl (UFL), the championship game of the 2024 United Football League
- IFL National Championship, originally known as United Bowl, championship of the Indoor Football League
- United Bowl, the championship game of United Indoor Football
- United Bowl, proposed name of the 2009 UFL Championship Game, the championship of the 2009 United Football League
