= Eric Powell (American football) =

American football player (born 1979)

No. 91
- Position: Defensive end

Personal information
- Born: November 16, 1979 (age 46); Orlando, Florida, U.S.
- Listed height: 6 ft 3 in (1.91 m)
- Listed weight: 284 lb (129 kg)

Career information
- High school: Jones (Orlando)
- College: Florida State
- NFL draft: 2003: undrafted

Career history
- Green Bay Packers (2003–2004); Cologne Centurions (2005); Detroit Lions (2005)*; Buffalo Bills (2005–2007); Houston Texans (2008)*; Florida Tuskers (2009–2010)
- * Offseason or practice squad member only
- Stats at Pro Football Reference

Eric Branford Powell (born November 16, 1979) is an American former professional football player who was a defensive end in the National Football League (NFL). He played college football for the Florida State Seminoles and was signed by the Green Bay Packers as an undrafted free agent in 2003.

Powell was also a member of the Cologne Centurions, Detroit Lions, Buffalo Bills, Houston Texans, and Florida Tuskers.

== College career ==
After graduation from Jones High School in Orlando, Florida, Powell attended Southwest Mississippi Community College. While at Southwest, Powell was named the number one junior college defensive end in the country by ESPN the Magazine. His success at Southwest led to a scholarship to play at Florida State University. In Orlando, September, 2001, Powell was shot by a small caliber handgun. He did not sustain any life-threatening injuries. He returned to Florida State to continue his academic and athletic career.

== Professional career ==
=== Green Bay Packers ===
After going undrafted in the 2003 NFL draft, Powell signed with the Green Bay Packers on May 2, 2003.

In 2004, he was allocated to NFL Europe and played for the Cologne Centurions.

=== Cologne Centurions ===
Powell was selected by the Cologne Centurions in the fourth round of the 2005 NFL Europe Free Agent Draft.

=== Florida Tuskers ===
Powell was drafted by the Florida Tuskers on the UFL Premiere Season Draft in 2009 and signed with the team on September 3. He was released on September 29. He was originally re-signed to the teams' practice squad. Before the first game of the season the UFL abolished the practice squad and Powell became a member of the Tuskers' active roster.
