= Terry Joyce =

American football player (1954–2011)

No. 87
- Position: Punter / Tight end

Personal information
- Born: July 18, 1954; Kirksville, Missouri, U.S.
- Died: June 17, 2011 (aged 56); St. Louis, Missouri, U.S.
- Listed height: 6 ft 6 in (1.98 m)
- Listed weight: 230 lb (104 kg)

Career information
- College: Missouri Southern State; Wichita State University; Highland Community College
- NFL draft: 1976: undrafted

Career history
- St. Louis Cardinals (1976–1977)

Career NFL statistics
- Punts: 86
- Punt average: 37
- Punt long: 58
- Stats at Pro Football Reference

Terrance Patrick Joyce (July 18, 1954 – June 17, 2011) was an American professional football player. A punter, he played two seasons professionally with the NFL St. Louis Cardinals in the 1970s. Terry Joyce was the father of Brandon Joyce, an offensive tackle for the Minnesota Vikings and Toronto Argonauts.

== Early life and education ==
Terry Joyce was born in Kirksville, Missouri and grew up in Edina, Missouri with his parents Pete and Eileen Joyce. Following graduation from Knox County high school in 1972 Joyce attended Highland Community College (Kansas), Missouri Southern State and Wichita State University. He was a three-sport athlete at Highland, playing quarterback, tight end and punter during football season. Additionally, he was a forward and center on the basketball team and was pitcher, third baseman and first baseman on the "Scotties" baseball team. Terry Joyce would finish his college education at Wichita State University and Missouri Southern State College. While at Missouri Southern he was voted a football All-American at tight end and punter, leading the nation in punting average. His football jersey number was retired posthumously at Knox County High School, and it remains Knox County High School's only retired number.

== Professional career ==
Terry Joyce was an undrafted free agent when signed by the Cardinals in 1976. He played in eighteen games over two seasons for St. Louis before being released. Over the next few years Joyce attended training camps with the Detroit Lions, L.A. Rams and San Francisco 49ers, but never made the final team rosters. Terry Joyce finished with a career average of 37 yards per punt, with his longest being 58 yards. He had three blocked punts on 86 attempts. In a 2008 interview with the St. Louis Post-Dispatch Joyce said the biggest thrill of his playing days was being a teammate of three NFL Hall of Famers Dan Dierdorf, Roger Wehrli, and Jackie Smith. Not too many guys can say that in a short career said Joyce.

== Death ==
Terry Joyce died of brain cancer on June 17, 2011. He was one of at least 345 NFL players to be diagnosed after death with chronic traumatic encephalopathy (CTE), which is caused by repeated hits to the head. His death came less than a year after the murder of son Brandon Joyce, who was shot during a robbery on Christmas Eve, 2010 and died four days later. Terry Joyce is survived by wife Linda and daughter, Doctor Lindsay Joyce, MD.

== Honors ==
- College football All-American
- Member, Highland Community College Hall of Fame. Inducted August 1999.
