= Darius Vinnett =

American football player (born 1984)

No. 31, 24
- Position: Cornerback

Personal information
- Born: September 30, 1984 (age 42); St. Rose, Louisiana, U.S.
- Listed height: 5 ft 8 in (1.73 m)
- Listed weight: 170 lb (77 kg)

Career information
- High school: Destrehan (Destrehan, Louisiana)
- College: Arkansas
- NFL draft: 2007: undrafted

Career history
- St. Louis Rams (2007–2008); Atlanta Falcons (2008)*; Florida Tuskers (2009–2010); Virginia Destroyers (2011–2012)
- * Offseason or practice squad member only

Awards and highlights
- UFL champion (2011)

Career NFL statistics
- Total tackles: 13
- Stats at Pro Football Reference

Darius Vinnett (born September 30, 1984) is an American former professional football player who was a cornerback in the National Football League (NFL). He was signed by the St. Louis Rams as an undrafted free agent in 2007. He played college football for the Arkansas Razorbacks and high school football at Destrehan High School.

Vinnett was also a member of the Atlanta Falcons, Florida Tuskers and Virginia Destroyers.
