= John Madsen (American football) =

American football player (born 1983)

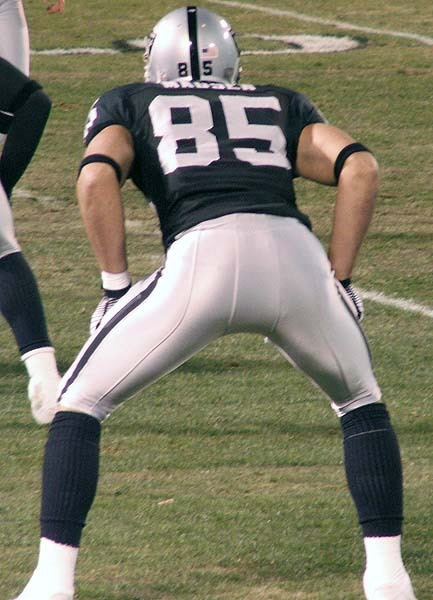
- Madsen with the Oakland Raiders

No. 85, 83
- Position: Tight end

Personal information
- Born: May 9, 1983 (age 43); Salt Lake City, Utah, U.S.
- Listed height: 6 ft 5 in (1.96 m)
- Listed weight: 240 lb (109 kg)

Career information
- High school: Hunter (West Valley City, Utah)
- College: Utah
- NFL draft: 2006: undrafted

Career history
- Oakland Raiders (2006–2008); Cleveland Browns (2008); Las Vegas Locomotives (2009); Detroit Lions (2010)*
- * Offseason or practice squad member only

Awards and highlights
- UFL champion (2009)

Career NFL statistics
- Receptions: 19
- Receiving yards: 248
- Receiving touchdowns: 2
- Stats at Pro Football Reference

John Christopher Madsen (born May 9, 1983) is an American former professional football player who was a tight end in the National Football League (NFL). He was signed by the Oakland Raiders as an undrafted free agent in 2006. He played college football for the Utah Utes.

He was also member of the Cleveland Browns, Las Vegas Locomotives and Detroit Lions.

== Early life ==
He graduated in 2001 from Hunter High School in West Valley City, Utah, where he played basketball, but never football. His first experience in organized football was for Snow College, a community college in Ephraim, Utah, where he played wide receiver. After one season, he transferred to the University of Utah and was a productive contributor to the football team at the same position. His career stats at Utah were 85 receptions, for 1146 yards, and 12 touchdowns. Madsen had a 13.5 yards per catch average.

== Professional career ==
=== Oakland Raiders ===
Originally a wide receiver, Madsen was converted to tight end in order to make the team. He was the only undrafted free agent to make the Raiders' initial 53-man squad in 2006. Undrafted rookies WR Will Buchanan and OLB Ricky Brown were signed to the active roster later in the season. Madsen was an exclusive-rights free agent in 2008 and re-signed on March 21. He was released by the team on September 20 after tight end Ben Troupe was signed.

Madsen was re-signed by the Raiders after offensive tackle Seth Wand was placed on injured reserve on October 6, 2008. He was released again on November 13.

=== Cleveland Browns ===
Madsen was signed by the Cleveland Browns on December 17, 2008, after tight end Steve Heiden was placed on injured reserve but only saw action in 4 games. He was waived on August 24, 2009.

=== Detroit Lions ===
Madsen signed with the Detroit Lions on May 11, 2010, but was waived 3 days later on May 14.
