= J. P. Losman =

American football player and coach (born 1981)

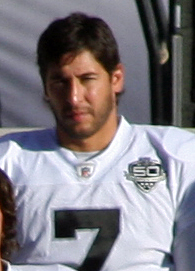
- Losman with the Oakland Raiders in 2009

Washington Huskies
- Title: Quarterbacks coach

Personal information
- Born: March 12, 1981 (age 45); Los Angeles, California, U.S.
- Listed height: 6 ft 2 in (1.88 m)
- Listed weight: 217 lb (98 kg)

Career information
- Position: Quarterback (No. 7, 6)
- High school: Venice (Los Angeles)
- College: Tulane (1999–2003)
- NFL draft: 2004: 1st round, 22nd overall pick

Career history

Playing
- Buffalo Bills (2004–2008); Las Vegas Locomotives (2009); Oakland Raiders (2009); Seattle Seahawks (2010); Miami Dolphins (2011)

Coaching
- Clemson (2017–2019) Student coaching intern; Clemson (2020) Offensive analyst; Clemson (2021) Senior offensive analyst; Oklahoma (2022–2024) Player personnel and football administration assistant; Washington (2025) Offensive quality control coach; Washington (2026–present) Quarterbacks coach

Awards and highlights
- As player: UFL champion (2009); Second-team All-Conference USA (2003); As coach: CFP national champion (2018)

Career NFL statistics
- Passing attempts: 952
- Passing completions: 564
- Completion percentage: 59.2%
- TD–INT: 33–34
- Passing yards: 6,271
- Passer rating: 75.6
- Stats at Pro Football Reference

Jonathan Paul Losman (born March 12, 1981) is an American football coach and former player who serves as the quarterbacks coach for the Washington Huskies. He played professionally as a quarterback for eight seasons in the National Football League (NFL), primarily with the Buffalo Bills. He played college football for the Tulane Green Wave and was selected by the Bills in the first round (22nd overall) in the 2004 NFL draft.

Intended to replace Drew Bledsoe as Buffalo's franchise quarterback, Losman was plagued with inconsistent play, injuries, and consistent coaching turnover during his stint with the team, and he was eventually replaced by Trent Edwards. Losman's Bills career was considered a disappointment due to the fact he was taken in the same round of the draft as Eli Manning, Philip Rivers, and Ben Roethlisberger, who all went on to have successful careers as franchise quarterbacks with their teams.

Upon leaving the Bills, Losman signed with the Las Vegas Locomotives in the upstart United Football League, leading the team to winning the inaugural UFL championship game before finishing out his playing career with stints with the Oakland Raiders, Seattle Seahawks, and Miami Dolphins. He later became a college coach with Clemson and Oklahoma before joining Washington.

== Early life ==
Losman was born on March 12, 1981 in Venice, Los Angeles. He grew up living with a single mother, Tricia, who was of Mexican descent and worked multiple jobs after her divorce from his father, Greg, a former star athlete at Venice High School. Like his father, J.P. Losman attended Venice High School, where he played baseball, basketball, and football. He earned Parade All-American honors and was rated the No. 3 quarterback in the nation by PrepStar magazine. He accepted an athletic scholarship to attend college at the University of California, Los Angeles (UCLA).

== College career ==
Losman enrolled at UCLA early during the spring quarter of 1999 to compete for the starting quarterback position. However, UCLA informed him that he would not be the starter, and he transferred.

Losman eventually transferred to Tulane University to play for head coach Chris Scelfo, who had made late recruiting efforts to have him join the team just prior to Losman's committing to UCLA. After sitting out the 1999 season due to NCAA transfer rules, Losman served as the backup quarterback for two seasons behind future NFL 1st round pick Patrick Ramsey. Losman had only spot starter's duty in his first two seasons. He passed for 299 yards and 2 touchdowns in his first start against East Carolina during his freshman season.

In 2002, his first year as a full-time starter, Losman led the Green Wave to an 8–5 record and a 36–28 victory in the inaugural Hawaii Bowl against the host team Hawaii Warriors. After a 3–1 start in the 2003 season, Tulane suffered multiple injuries which depleted its already thin depth on defense, and slumped to finish with a 5–7 record. Losman completed his collegiate career completing 570 of 987 passes (57.7 percent) for 6,754 yards, 60 touchdowns, and 27 interceptions. He ran for 241 yards, with 10 scores on 237 carries.

While at Tulane, he earned a political science degree with a minor in media arts.

== Professional career ==
Pre-draft measurables
Height	Weight	Arm length	Hand span	40-yard dash	10-yard split	20-yard split	Vertical jump	Broad jump
6 ft 2 1/4 in (1.89 m)	224 lb (102 kg)	31 1/2 in (0.80 m)	9 in (0.23 m)	4.69 s	1.53 s	2.69 s	33.0 in (0.84 m)	9 ft 8 in (2.95 m)
All values from NFL Combine

=== Buffalo Bills ===
==== 2004 ====
After the Buffalo Bills selected University of Wisconsin wide receiver Lee Evans with the 13th pick of the 2004 draft, the Bills traded back into the first round by trading their second round pick to the Dallas Cowboys and selected Losman with the 22nd pick in the first round of the NFL draft. He was the first quarterback to be drafted by the Bills in the first round since 1983, when the team drafted Jim Kelly. Like Kelly, Losman was drafted in a quarterback-rich class, and was the fourth (and final) quarterback taken in the first round that year, following Eli Manning, Philip Rivers, and Ben Roethlisberger.

Losman's NFL career got off to a shaky start during his first training camp when teammate Troy Vincent ran into Losman and broke his leg in a freak accident. Losman suffered a broken left fibula, which delayed his development as a rookie. He eventually recovered and had limited action in the 2004 NFL season, appearing briefly in three games and completing 3-of-5 passes for 32 yards and 1 interception while backing up Drew Bledsoe. Following the Bills' February 2005 release of Bledsoe, Losman was named the team's starting quarterback by head coach Mike Mularkey.

==== 2005 ====
In the first game of the 2005 season (Losman's first professional start), Losman led the Bills to a 22–7 victory over the Houston Texans. Losman subsequently struggled with his accuracy and, consequently, his confidence; with those struggles followed consecutive Bills losses. This eventually led the Bills to bench Losman in favor of veteran quarterback Kelly Holcomb in the fifth game of the 2005 season. After Holcomb suffered a head injury in the first quarter of the Bills' Week 10 game against the Kansas City Chiefs, Losman returned to the lineup and threw two quick touchdown strikes to Lee Evans, leading the Bills to a 14–3 victory. The Bills went on to lose all but one of their remaining games in 2005 with Holcomb and Losman splitting time under center.

==== 2006 ====
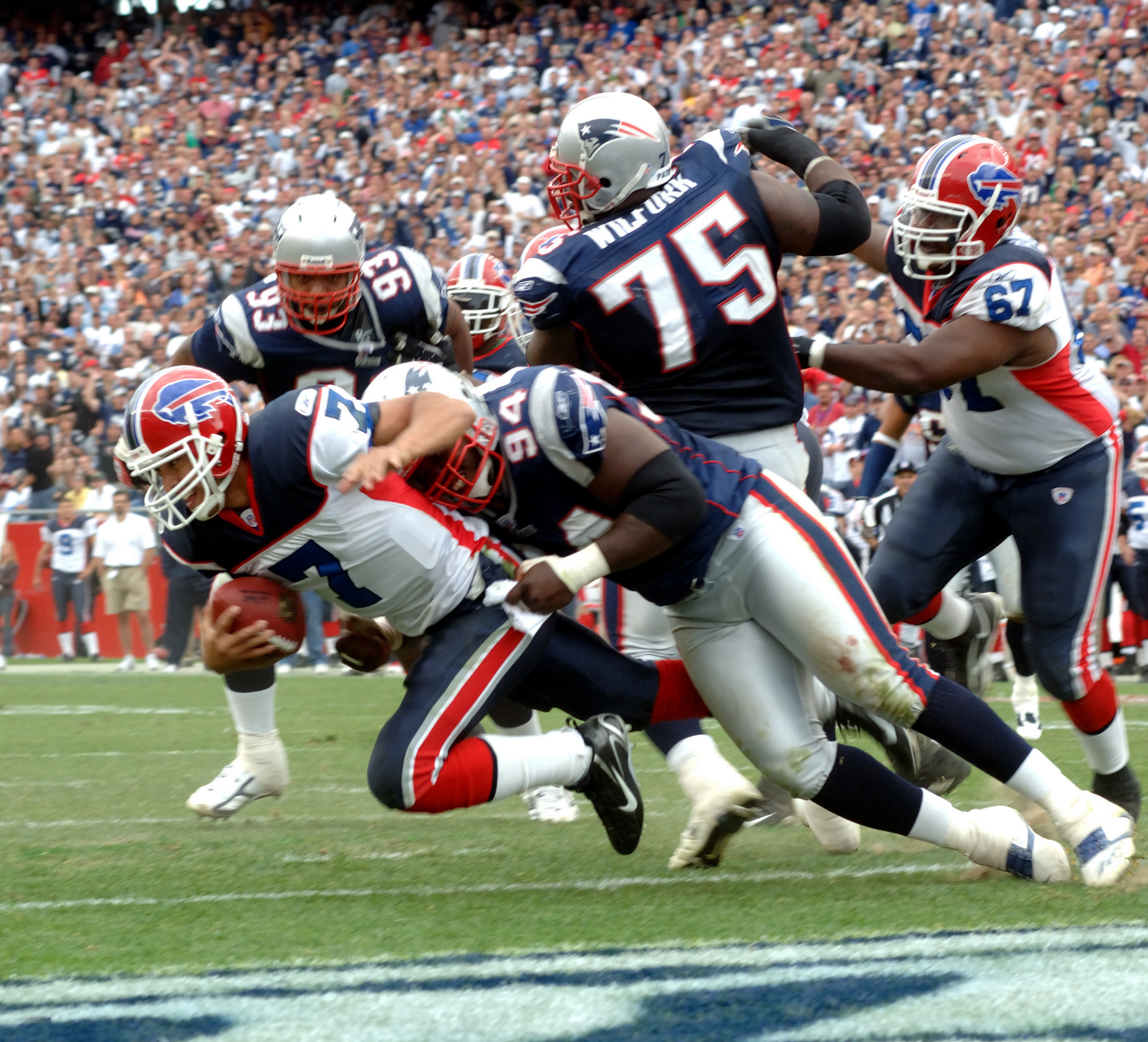
Losman is tackled by New England's Ty Warren for a safety, Week 1, 2006.

The Bills cleaned house during there following off-season, with changes in management and the coaching staff. Marv Levy, the team's new general manager and former Bills head coach, and Dick Jauron, the new head coach, planned to have Losman compete for the starting job against Holcomb and free-agent signee Craig Nall. Losman won the job during the preseason.

Losman was considered by many to be a bust until his much-improved 2006 season, in which he threw 19 touchdowns and 14 interceptions in 16 games, with 300-yard games against the New York Jets and Houston Texans. He led last-minute, fourth quarter scoring drives to beat the Texans and Jacksonville Jaguars. Losman had a 62.5 completion percentage for the season, a record for Buffalo Bill quarterbacks in a full 16-game season. He was rated the 11th best passer in the NFL, with an 84.9 passer rating.

Losman's performance over the last half of the 2006 season was greatly improved. However, the offense as a whole was hurt by a below-average rushing attack which created many third down and long situations. After the season, the Bills traded Willis McGahee to the Baltimore Ravens and drafted University of California running back Marshawn Lynch with the 12th overall selection of the 2007 Draft and Fresno State College running back Dwayne Wright in the 4th round.

Losman was also mired behind a sieve-like offensive line for most of the first half of the 2006 season; subsequent personnel changes made during the Bills bye week resulted in improved offensive line play and, consequently, more improved and consistent production from Losman. After the season, the Bills further bolstered their offensive line in free agency, signing guard Derrick Dockery, right tackle Langston Walker, and guard/center Jason Whittle.

==== 2007 ====
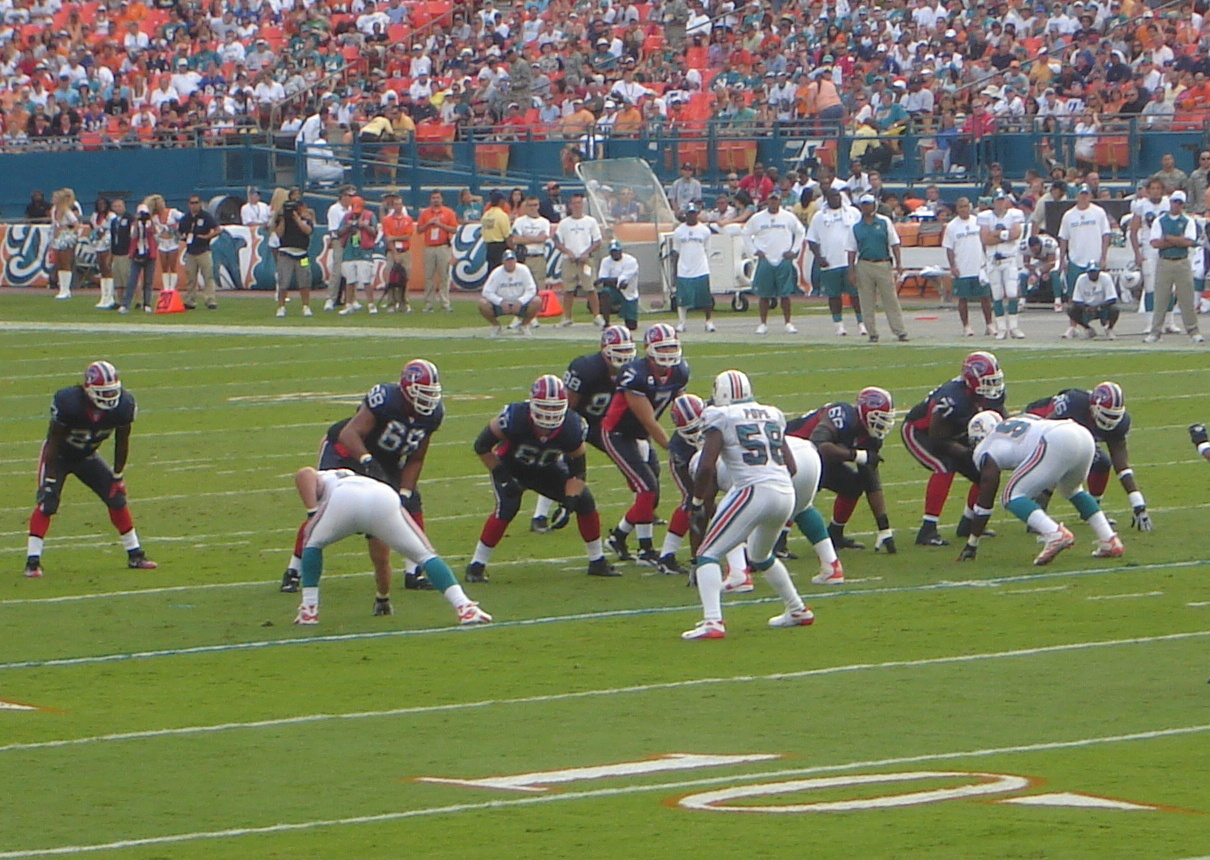
Losman (#7) leading the Bills offense against Miami in 2007

The Bills drafted Stanford University quarterback Trent Edwards with the 92nd overall pick in the 2007 NFL draft. Edwards was considered by many to be the 3rd best available quarterback prospect in the draft (behind #1 overall JaMarcus Russell and #22 overall Brady Quinn), but waited until late in the 3rd round prior to the Bills selection. After the draft, statements from both Bills' coaching staff and management reaffirmed Losman's position as the starting quarterback.

For 2007, Buffalo offensive coordinator Steve Fairchild indicated that with the improved offensive line he plans to employ a more wide-open offense utilizing multiple wide receiver sets and taking greater advantage of the running backs in the passing game. On September 23, Losman suffered a grade one sprain of his left knee in the first series of plays in a game against New England. He was hit late after completing a four-yard pass to Marshawn Lynch by New England Patriots nose tackle Vince Wilfork, who was assessed a 15-yard roughing the passer penalty. "It was just a simple swing pass to get an early completion. The guy came in, hit me in the knee," said Losman, who stayed in the game for two plays "I knew something was wrong from the get-go, but I figured I'd play a few plays and maybe the pain would go away."

Losman was out for the next two games and was available for the October 21 home game against the Baltimore Ravens, but Dick Jauron chose to give Edwards the nod, just for the week. Edwards performance impressed Jauron enough that on October 23, Trent Edwards was named the starting quarterback for the Bills, having won 2 of the 3 games he started. Reports surfaced, however, that many players on the team were unhappy about Losman losing his job. The reports continued to allege that team owner Ralph Wilson, Jr. wanted Losman benched so that he could not reach the statistical milestones needed for his bonus.

In an October 28, 2007 game at the New York Jets, Edwards injured his wrist and was replaced by Losman. Losman led the Bills on two consecutive scoring drives, including one that ended with an 85-yard touchdown pass to wide receiver Lee Evans. Starting the next game for injured Trent Edwards, Losman threw for almost 300 yards and one touchdown to lead the Bills to a win. He started three more games, including a narrow win over the then-winless Miami Dolphins and a 56-10 blowout loss to New England on NBC Sunday Night Football, before being benched again for Edwards.

At the end of the season, Losman was upset about losing his job to Edwards and wanted to be traded, but said he would play out the season if necessary. Following the season, Gabe Ehrlichmann of Bleacher Report argued that Losman was not given a fair chance by the Bills organization that year.

==== 2008 ====
Though he wanted to be traded, Losman continued playing for the Bills in 2008, filling in for an injured Trent Edwards intermittently throughout the season with limited success. The team did not win a game with Losman as the starter, including a game in which he lost a fumble to the New York Jets defense that resulted in the Jets' game-winning touchdown.

Losman's contract expired at the end of the 2008 season and the Bills made no effort to keep him, instead replacing him with Ryan Fitzpatrick. Looking back at Losman's stint with Buffalo, former Bills vice president of player personnel John Guy was quoted as saying "J.P. never had a fair chance. I'll never forget his first day of practice and they were blitzing him every which way. I remember saying, 'This isn't the way to break in a quarterback.'" In his five-year stint with the team, Losman had three different offensive coordinators.

=== Las Vegas Locomotives ===
Losman was signed by the Las Vegas Locomotives of the United Football League (UFL). He signed with the Locomotives on July 21, 2009. On November 27, he helped the Locomotives win the inaugural UFL Championship. Losman recorded 9 touchdowns and two interceptions on 1,193 passing yards for the Locomotives in 2009.

Losman worked out for the Indianapolis Colts on December 4, 2009, after their backup quarterback Jim Sorgi was injured in practice.

=== Oakland Raiders ===
With injury to starting quarterback Bruce Gradkowski, the Oakland Raiders signed Losman on December 15, 2009. Losman made his first appearance for the team against the Denver Broncos on December 20, throwing one incomplete pass after both quarterbacks Charlie Frye and JaMarcus Russell suffered injuries and had to leave the game.

=== Seattle Seahawks ===
On May 18, 2010, Losman signed with the Seattle Seahawks. He was released by the Seahawks on September 4. On November 10, Seahawks head coach Pete Carroll reported on Sirius Radio that the Seahawks had signed Losman again. Losman participated in the January 8, 2011, playoff game between the Seahawks and the New Orleans Saints.

=== Miami Dolphins ===
The Miami Dolphins signed Losman on October 25, 2011. On December 11, he came in for injured quarterback Matt Moore in the third quarter. Losman retired after the end of the season.

== Career statistics ==
Legend
**Bold**	Career high

=== NFL ===
Year	Team	Games			Passing									Rushing					Sacks		Fumbles	
Year	Team	GP	GS	Record	Cmp	Att	Pct	Yds	Avg	Lng	TD	Int	Rtg	Att	Yds	Avg	Lng	TD	Sck	SckY	Fum	Lost
2004	BUF	4	0	–	3	5	60.0	32	6.4	17	0	1	39.2	2	15	**7.5**	10	0	1	0	1	1
2005	BUF	9	8	1–7	119	228	49.6	1,340	5.9	58	8	8	64.9	31	**154**	5.0	**30**	0	26	197	7	3
2006	BUF	16	16	**7–9**	**268**	**429**	62.5	**3,051**	**7.1**	83	**19**	**14**	**84.9**	**38**	140	3.7	15	1	**47**	**332**	**13**	**7**
2007	BUF	8	7	2–5	111	175	**63.4**	1,204	6.9	85	4	6	76.9	20	110	5.5	17	0	14	103	5	2
2008	BUF	5	2	0–2	63	104	60.6	584	5.6	**87**	2	5	62.3	12	70	5.8	17	**2**	15	119	8	4
2009	OAK	1	0	–	0	1	0.0	0	0.0	0	0	0	39.6	0	0	0.0	0	0	0	0	0	0
2010	SEA	0	0	–	DNP																	
2011	MIA	2	0	–	6	10	60.0	60	6.0	25	0	0	77.1	2	1	0.5	1	0	5	38	1	1
Career		45	33	10–23	564	952	59.2	6,271	6.6	87	33	34	75.6	105	490	4.7	30	3	108	789	35	17

=== UFL ===
Year	Team	Games		Passing								Rushing				Sacks	
Year	Team	GP	GS	Cmp	Att	Pct	Yds	Y/A	TD	Int	Rtg	Att	Yds	Avg	TD	Sck	YdsL
2009	LV	6	6	102	163	62.6	1,193	7.3	9	2	97.1	23	56	2.4	0	15	113
Career		6	6	102	163	62.6	1,193	7.3	9	2	97.1	23	56	2.4	0	15	113

=== College ===
Year	Team	Passing							
Year	Team	Cmp	Att	Pct	Yds	Y/A	TD	Int	Rtg
2000	Tulane	58	115	50.4	722	6.3	4	2	111.2
2001	Tulane	31	49	**63.3**	487	**9.9**	4	1	**169.6**
2002	Tulane	230	401	57.4	2,468	6.2	19	10	119.7
2003	Tulane	**251**	**422**	59.5	**3,077**	7.3	**33**	**14**	139.9
Career		570	987	57.8	6,754	6.8	60	27	129.8

== Coaching career ==
After his NFL career, Losman became a volunteer coach with the New Canaan High School football team. His wife encouraged him to pursue a full-time coaching career after two years. In 2017, Losman joined Clemson University in Clemson, South Carolina as a coaching intern. He eventually became an offensive coach and in March 2019, while taking part in throwing drills at Clemson's Pro Day, was asked by an NFL scout if he would consider returning to the league despite not having played since 2011; Losman declined.

In 2022, Losman was hired as a player personnel and football administration assistant at the University of Oklahoma in Norman.

Losman was eventually hired by the University of Washington in 2025. He served as the Offensive Quality coach in his first year before being promoted to Quarterbacks coach in 2026.
