= Willie Andrews =

American football player (born 1983)

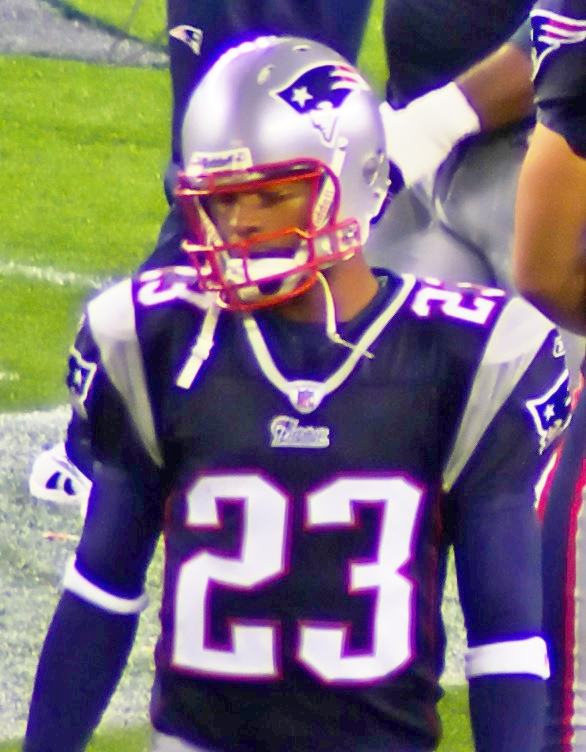
- Andrews with the New England Patriots in 2007

No. 23, 31
- Position: Safety

Personal information
- Born: November 2, 1983 (age 43); Longview, Texas, U.S.
- Listed height: 5 ft 10 in (1.78 m)
- Listed weight: 190 lb (86 kg)

Career information
- High school: Longview
- College: Baylor
- NFL draft: 2006: 7th round, 229th overall pick

Career history
- New England Patriots (2006–2007); Florida Tuskers (2009); Omaha Nighthawks (2010)

Awards and highlights
- First-team All-Big 12 (2004)

Career NFL statistics
- Total tackles: 23
- Return yards: 149
- Return touchdowns: 1
- Stats at Pro Football Reference

Willie Thedric Andrews (born November 2, 1983) is an American former professional football player who was a safety in the National Football League (NFL). He was selected by the New England Patriots in the seventh round of the 2006 NFL draft. He played college football for the Baylor Bears.

Andrews was also a member of the Florida Tuskers and Omaha Nighthawks.

== College career ==
Andrews was a three-year starter at Baylor and was awarded All-Big 12 honors in 2004 and 2005. Andrews ran a 4.38 40-yard dash at the 2006 NFL Combine in Indianapolis, Indiana.

== Professional career ==
Pre-draft measurables
Height	Weight	Arm length	Hand span	40-yard dash	10-yard split	20-yard split	20-yard shuttle	Three-cone drill	Vertical jump	Broad jump	Bench press
5 ft 9 3/8 in (1.76 m)	193 lb (88 kg)	29 3/4 in (0.76 m)	9 1/4 in (0.23 m)	4.47 s	1.58 s	2.57 s	4.27 s	6.99 s	36.5 in (0.93 m)	10 ft 4 in (3.15 m)	7 reps
All values from NFL Combine

=== New England Patriots ===
After being selected in the seventh round of the 2006 NFL draft with the 229th overall pick by the New England Patriots. Andrews played primarily on special teams; in 2007 Andrews returned a kickoff 74 yards for a touchdown in the Patriots' Week 7 game against the Miami Dolphins.

After multiple arrests in the 2008 offseason (see "Legal troubles" below), the Patriots released Andrews.

=== Florida Tuskers ===
Andrews was signed by the Florida Tuskers of the United Football League on September 3, 2009.

== Legal troubles ==
In July 2002, Andrews was sentenced to 30 days in jail after pleading guilty to a misdemeanor gun charge. The gun was found in his car by Texas State Troopers during a traffic stop. At the time, Andrews was serving a two-year probation for a March 2002 conviction for misdemeanor criminal mischief.

On February 5, 2008, two days after Super Bowl XLII, Andrews was arrested in Lowell, Massachusetts and charged with possession of marijuana with intent to distribute and operating an unregistered motor vehicle. Andrews was seen driving a black Ford Crown Victoria when police received a call that there was possible drug activity in the area. Police found $6,800 in cash and one-half pound (230 g) of marijuana in Andrews' unregistered car.

On June 30, 2008, Andrews was arrested at his home in Mansfield, Massachusetts and charged with assault with a dangerous weapon and unlawful possession of a firearm when police responded to a call that Andrews allegedly pointed a handgun at his girlfriend's head during an argument. The handgun Andrews allegedly used was found near a dumpster at Andrews apartment complex. Andrews was released by the Patriots the next day, July 1, 2008. The charges against Andrews were dropped in March 2009 after the victim refused to testify against him in court.

In May 2011, Andrews and 12 other individuals were arrested as part of a federal investigation.
