= Taye Biddle =

American gridiron football player (born 1983)

No. 11, 17, 15, 84
- Position: Wide receiver

Personal information
- Born: February 27, 1983 (age 43); Decatur, Alabama, U.S.
- Listed height: 6 ft 1 in (1.85 m)
- Listed weight: 185 lb (84 kg)

Career information
- College: Ole Miss
- NFL draft: 2006: undrafted

Career history
- Carolina Panthers (2006); Tampa Bay Buccaneers (2007–2008)*; Detroit Lions (2008)*; New York Giants (2008); Florida Tuskers (2009); Minnesota Vikings (2010)*; Sacramento Mountain Lions (2010); Edmonton Eskimos (2011)*; Pittsburgh Power (2012)*
- * Offseason or practice squad member only

Career NFL statistics
- Receptions: 3
- Receiving yards: 37
- Stats at Pro Football Reference

RaTavious Anton "Taye" Biddle (born February 27, 1983) is an American former professional football player who was a wide receiver in the National Football League (NFL). He played college football for the Ole Miss Rebels. He was signed by the Carolina Panthers as an undrafted free agent in 2006.

Biddle was also a member of the Tampa Bay Buccaneers, Detroit Lions, New York Giants, Florida Tuskers, Minnesota Vikings, Sacramento Mountain Lions, Edmonton Eskimos and Pittsburgh Power.

== College career ==
Biddle played college football for the Ole Miss Rebels. He also competed for the Rebels track and field team, where he was an All-American sprinter in 2002.

== Professional career ==
=== Carolina Panthers ===
He was signed as an undrafted free agent out of Ole Miss by the Carolina Panthers and played with them through the 2007 pre-season before being released in the final roster cuts. Biddle attracted national attention after catching 2 passes for 108 yards and 2 touchdowns in a pre-season game against the New York Giants on August 11, 2007.

=== Detroit Lions ===
On July 29, 2008, Biddle was signed by the Detroit Lions. On August 18, he was waived/injured by the team and subsequently placed on injured reserve. He was later released with an injury settlement.

=== New York Giants ===
On September 8, 2008, Biddle was signed to the practice squad of the New York Giants. The team released wide receiver Marcus Monk from the practice squad to make room for Biddle. On September 24, Biddle was promoted to the active roster after wide receiver Plaxico Burress was suspended for one game. The Giants released waived Biddle on October 8 and re-signed him to the practice squad the following day.

Following the 2008 season, Biddle was re-signed to a future contract on January 12, 2009. He was waived on August 31.

=== Florida Tuskers ===
Biddle played for the Florida Tuskers of the United Football League in 2009, catching 30 passes for 525 yards and two touchdowns.

=== Minnesota Vikings ===
Biddle worked out for the Minnesota Vikings on December 1, 2009. He was signed to a future contract on January 22, 2010. Biddle was waived as part of final cuts before the beginning of the 2010 season.

=== Sacramento Mountain Lions ===
Biddle played for the Mountain Lions of the United Football League for the 2010 season, recording 23 receptions for 310 yards and 1 touchdown.

=== Edmonton Eskimos ===
On March 3, 2011, Biddle signed with the Eskimos.

=== Pittsburgh Power ===
On February 27, 2012, Biddle signed with the Power. He was released by the Power on March 1, 2012.

== Personal life ==
Biddle was shot two times, once in the leg and the other in his hand in his hometown of Decatur, Alabama on January 18, 2009, while in his vehicle outside of his mothers apartment building. His injuries were non-life-threatening.

Biddle is also currently in a Florida prison for kidnapping.
