= 2009 UFL championship game =

American football game

Las Vegas Locomotives (4–2)	Florida Tuskers (6–0)
20	17
Head coach: Jim Fassel	Head coach: Jim Haslett
	1	2	3	4	OT	Total
LV	0	3	0	14	3	20
FL	7	0	0	10	0	17
- Date: November 27, 2009
- Stadium: Sam Boyd Stadium; Whitney, Nevada
- MVP: DeDe Dorsey
- Referee: Dave Cutaia
- Attendance: 14,801

Ceremonies
- National anthem: Joe Barbara
- Coin toss: Dave Cutaia
- Halftime show: "The Las Vegas Circus Train"

TV in the United States
- Network: Versus
- Announcers: Dave Sims (play-by-play); Doug Flutie (color analysis); Anita Marks and Kordell Stewart (reports)

The 2009 UFL championship game was the concluding game of the United Football League's inaugural season. The game was staged at Sam Boyd Stadium in Whitney, Nevada on Friday, November 27, 2009 (one day after Thanksgiving), and was won by the Las Vegas Locomotives, who defeated the previously unbeaten Florida Tuskers 20–17 on a 33-yard field goal in overtime.

== Background ==
The United Football League originally intended to begin play in 2008, and in March of that year selected Sam Boyd Stadium in Whitney, Nevada to host its championship game on the day after that year's Thanksgiving holiday. (The league intended to bill the game as "The United Bowl," but was unable to gain rights from the United Indoor Football or its successor, the Indoor Football League, to use the name; the IFL continues to use the United Bowl name.) When the UFL delayed its start until 2009, the game was moved to the corresponding date in 2009 and kept in Las Vegas.

The Tuskers were the top team in the UFL's premiere season, finishing the regular season with a perfect 6–0 record. Coached by Jim Haslett, the Tuskers led the league in scoring, putting up 217 points behind an offense featuring quarterback Brooks Bollinger (the league leader in completion percentage, passing yards, and TD throws), running back Tatum Bell, and receiver Taye Biddle (the league leader in receiving yards). The Tuskers' defense included such players as Dexter Jackson, a former Super Bowl MVP with the Tampa Bay Buccaneers. The Tuskers secured a spot in the championship game with an October 30 win over the Locos at Tropicana Field in St. Petersburg, Florida.

The Locomotives, victors of the first game in UFL history (30–17 over the California Redwoods on October 8, 2009), sported a roster including quarterback J. P. Losman, running back DeDe Dorsey (the league's 2nd leading rusher), linebacker Teddy Lehman (the league leader in tackles), and lineman Eric Henderson (who shared the regular season lead in sacks with Tuskers lineman Patrick Chukwurah). Coached by Jim Fassel, the Locos finished with a 4–2 record after starting the season 1–2 (both losses were to the Tuskers—a 29–15 home loss on October 14 and the above-mentioned loss in St. Petersburg); they secured their berth in the title game with a 16–10 win at California on November 14. The game was held in Florida

== Game recap ==
=== First half ===
Florida (the designated home team by virtue of their 1st place regular season finish) took the ball first after winning the opening coin toss, but they and Las Vegas traded punts on their opening possessions. The Tuskers' second possession saw Brooks Bollinger connect with long throws to Taye Biddle for 32 yards, and Jayson Foster for 15 yards, and ended with Bollinger connecting up the middle with Marcus Maxwell on an 8-yard touchdown throw with 5:13 left in the first quarter. After scoring, Maxwell celebrated by slam dunking the ball over the crossbar, noticeably budging the goal post out of alignment and causing a minor delay for repairs before the extra point.

Las Vegas moved the ball into Tuskers territory on the ensuing drive; after changing ends during the quarter break, they moved the ball to the Florida 2-yard line where, on 2nd and Goal, Tuskers linebacker Odell Thurman forced a fumble by Locos running back Marcel Shipp that was recovered by defensive end Patrick Chukwurah. After a 3-and-out by the Tuskers' offense, the ensuing Locos drive nearly ended with a Darius Vinnett interception, but the pick was called back due to an offsides penalty. On the next play, Losman connected with Samie Parker on a 16-yard completion for a 1st down before having to depart with an injury. Tim Rattay finished the drive at QB, moving the Locos to the Florida 35, where Graham Gano missed wide on a 53-yard field goal attempt. The ensuing Tuskers drive also ended on a missed field goal, as Matt Bryant hooked a 51-yard try to the left.

Losman returned at QB for the Locos on the next drive, connecting with John Madsen on its second play. Madsen appeared to fumble the ball away to the Tuskers, but a replay challenge determined that Madsen fumbled while his foot was on the boundary line, making him out of bounds and ending the play. The Locos drive ended two plays later in a punt. In fact, the next two drives ended in punts, the second of which featured what appeared to be a serious injury to the Locos' Josh Scobey, who leaned in with his head when tackling Tuskers return man Willie Andrews. Though Scobey left under his own power, he would not return due to back spasms. The Tuskers' next drive ended in an interception, which the Locos turned into a 45-yard field goal by Gano to end the half and make the score 7–3 in favor of the Tuskers.

=== Second half ===
Ending a Locomotives' drive that carried over from a scoreless 3rd quarter (when both teams had 3 possessions that ended in punts), DeDe Dorsey sprinted down the right sideline for a 38-yard TD run, giving the Locos their first lead at 10–7 with 12:53 left. Unbowed, the Tuskers responded in quick fashion; starting from his own 20, Bollinger connected with Taye Biddle on a 15-yard pass play, immediately followed by a 10-yard Tatum Bell run. On 2nd and 5 from the 50-yard line, Bollinger went deep and connected with Marcus Maxwell on a 40-yard throw, the longest offensive play of the game. The Tuskers regained the lead on the next play, as Bollinger threw up the middle to Frank Murphy on a 10-yard TD catch. The five-play, 80-yard drive gave Florida a 14-10 lead with 10:27 left.

After a 3-and-out drive by Las Vegas that featured the Tuskers' fourth sack of the day on Losman, the Tuskers got the ball back on their 35-yard line with 8:19 remaining. One play after Bollinger connected on a 14-yard pass to Bobby Sippio, Locos defensive end Josh Mallard forced a Tatum Bell fumble that was quickly recovered by Bollinger. On the next play, Bollinger was hit just before the throw by Adrian Awasom and fumbled the ball, which was recovered and returned by Locos lineman Ross Kolodziej. The play was ruled a touchdown (Kolodziej fumbled and another Locos player recovered in the end zone), but Florida immediately challenged the call. After a replay review, Bollinger's fumble remained as called, but the ball was ruled down at the Tuskers' 2-yard line, which was moved ahead to the 1-yard line after the Tuskers' Michael Pittman was penalized for a Horse-collar tackle that led to Kolodziej's fumble. Three plays later, Dorsey snuck into the end zone up the middle for his second touchdown of the quarter, giving Las Vegas a 17-14 lead with 5:58 left.

Much in the same way as they responded after the first Locos' touchdown, Florida quickly moved the ball down the field on the next drive. Bollinger started with 2 quick completions to Biddle (18 yards) and Maxwell (15 yards). Two plays later, on 2nd and 6 from the Locos 41, Bollinger found Jayson Foster, who broke a tackle and sprinted 41-yards down the left sideline to the end zone. Fassel and the Locos immediately challenged the call, and after review it was determined that Foster was down by contact at the Las Vegas 35-yard line. After the reversal, the Locos' defense clamped down, despite allowing a 22-yard throw to Pittman to the Las Vegas 11-yard line. The Tuskers would settle for a 27-yard field goal by Bryant, which tied the game at 17.

Florida regained possession after a Locos 3-and-out. On the 3rd play of the drive (after a Locos pass interference penalty gave the Tuskers a first down), Bollinger connected with Pittman for a 22-yard play to the Vegas 49 (Pittman was injured on the play). After three incomplete passes (the first being a Marcus Maxwell attempt at a spectacular one-handed 30-yard catch), Florida punted away to Las Vegas. Though he initially called a pass play in an attempt to drive up the field for a game-winning field goal, Las Vegas coach Jim Fassel decided on a kneel down play to run out the clock and send the championship game into overtime, the first OT game in UFL history.

=== Overtime ===
Winning the coin toss, Florida elected to receive the ball. Micheal Spurlock's kickoff return was pushed back to the Tuskers' own 9-yard line after a holding penalty. Two plays later, on 3rd and 7, Bollinger escaped a sack but his pass was intercepted by Locos' defensive back Isaiah Trufant. Trufant fumbled but the ball was immediately recovered by Locos' cornerback Trey Young. After one running play to center the ball for a field goal attempt, Graham Gano hit a 33-yard field goal, sneaking the ball just inside the right upright to give the Locomotives the first UFL title, and denying the Tuskers a perfect season, with a final score of 20-17.

== Scoring summary ==
Team	Qtr	Time Left	Scoring Info	Plays	Yards	T.O.P.	LV	FL
FL	1st	5:13	Maxwell 8-yd TD pass from Bollinger (Bryant kick)	8	64	5:13	0	7
LV	2nd	0:00	Gano 46-yard FG	4	21	0:24	3	7
LV	4th	12:53	Dorsey 38-yd TD run (Gano kick)	5	67	2:40	10	7
FL	4th	10:27	Murphy 10-yd TD pass from Bollinger (Bryant kick)	5	80	2:25	10	14
LV	4th	5:58	Dorsey 1-yd TD run (Gano kick)	3	1	0:54	17	14
FL	4th	2:10	Bryant 27-yd FG	11	69	3:48	17	17
LV	OT	13:13	Gano 33-yd FG	2	(-1)	0:43	20	17

Attendance: 14,801

== Most Valuable Player ==
Las Vegas running back DeDe Dorsey was awarded the game's Most Valuable Player award thanks to his 98 all-purpose yards (32 receiving, 66 rushing) and two 4th-quarter touchdowns that gave the Locomotives the lead on both occasions. The MVP award was chosen through a text message vote, the options of which were presented to fans in attendance and to viewers on Versus during the 4th quarter; voting was then open until the conclusion of the game.

== Notes ==
- By virtue of their win, the Locomotives became the first recipients the William Hambrecht Trophy, the UFL's championship trophy that is named for Bill Hambrecht, the Locos' owner and a founding investor in the United Football League. The Locos are also the only recipients of the Hambrecht Trophy in its original arcing design, as the trophy was redesigned for 2010.
- The game was the only one during the UFL's Premiere Season to have a daytime start (just after 12PM Las Vegas time, or 3PM Eastern).
- Kicker Graham Gano, who scored the first points in league history, also scored the last points in the premiere season with his championship winning field goal.
