= Virginia Destroyers =

American football team of the United Football League (2009–2012)

Logo

General information
- Founded: 2009
- Folded: 2012
- Stadium: Tropicana Field (2009); Citrus Bowl (2009–2010); Virginia Beach Sportsplex (2011–2012)
- Headquartered: Virginia Beach, Virginia
- Colors: Cardinal red, navy blue, gray

Personnel
- Owner: Bill Mayer

Championships
- League championships: 1: 2011

The Virginia Destroyers were a professional American football team based in Virginia Beach, Virginia. They began play in the United Football League (UFL) in the 2011 season. They played their home games at the Virginia Beach Sportsplex.

The team succeeded the Florida Tuskers, a charter UFL franchise based in Orlando, Florida, from 2009 to 2010. The Tuskers appeared in the first two UFL championship games, losing both to the Las Vegas Locomotives. In 2010, the league suspended the Tuskers' operations and moved the remnants of the team to Virginia Beach to assume the identity (and some executive staff) of a previously announced expansion team that was to begin play in 2011.

The Destroyers' business license expired on March 1, 2013; the team had effectively ceased operations several weeks earlier.

== Franchise history ==
=== Florida Tuskers (2009–2010) ===
==== 2009 season ====
Orlando was awarded a franchise for the UFL's 2009 season. Former New Orleans Saints and St. Louis Rams head coach Jim Haslett was named the first head coach of the team on March 11, 2009.

Tryouts for the four teams that would play in the 2009 season took place in Orlando and Las Vegas during the summer, with the draft taking place on June 19. With their first selection, the Tuskers picked Fred Bledsoe, who had gone undrafted in the 2008 NFL draft before signing with the Green Bay Packers as a practice squad member.

The team's name, along with its colors and uniforms, were unveiled to the public in August, two months before the start of the season. On the same day it was announced that the Tampa Bay Rays had bought interest in the team.

In their inaugural season, the Tuskers were led by quarterback Brooks Bollinger, and wide receiver Taye Biddle. Bollinger was the league leader in passing yards, while Biddle led in receiving yards. On the defensive side of the ball, Odell Thurman led the team in tackles, Patrick Chukwurah was the league leader in sacks, and Jerome Carter led the league in interceptions.

The team had a large number of former players from the nearby Tampa Bay Buccaneers. Among the Buccaneer alumni was Matt Bryant, who once kicked a game-winning 62-yard field goal as time expired, which ranked as the third-longest successful attempt in NFL history. Other ex-Bucs included Micheal Spurlock, the first player in Tampa Bay history to return a kickoff for a touchdown, and Super Bowl XXXVII MVP Dexter Jackson.

The Tuskers put together a league-best undefeated 6–0 record in the regular season, clinching a spot in the championship game in Week 4. However, in the championship game, the Tuskers were beaten by the Las Vegas Locomotives, losing on a game-winning field goal in overtime. Despite the team being unable to complete a perfect season, Jim Haslett was named Coach of the Year, while Bollinger was given the league's MVP award.

==== 2010 season ====
Florida Tuskers logo

In January 2010, head coach Jim Haslett left the team to become the defensive coordinator for the Washington Redskins of the National Football League. On February 9, 2010, UFL commissioner Michael Huyghue named Jay Gruden as head coach and general manager. On the same day it was announced that the Tampa Bay Rays had sold their interest in the team, meaning the Tuskers would be fully based in Orlando for the 2010 season. After several months of league ownership, a group led by Joe Theismann purchased the team in October 2010. The Tuskers signed WYGM as their radio affiliate, becoming the second UFL team to have one.

Florida extended their regular season winning streak to seven games when they defeated the Las Vegas Locos in their opener on September 18, 27–20. The Tuskers lost their first regular season game in franchise history in Week 2 when they were defeated by the Sacramento Mountain Lions, 24–20. They dropped their next contest on September 30 against the Locos, 20–17, the first time Las Vegas had beaten Florida in a regular season match-up. After splitting their next two games, the Tuskers were 2–3 and in danger of being eliminated from championship contention. After backup quarterback Chris Greisen became the new starter in Week 8, the Tuskers went on to win their final three games, sending them back to the championship game, once again facing, and losing to, Las Vegas.

=== Virginia Destroyers ===
==== 2011 season ====
The UFL originally announced an expansion team based in Norfolk, Virginia, to begin play in 2011. Jim Speros, owner of the Baltimore Stallions and (briefly) the Montreal Alouettes of the Canadian Football League, was named as the team's owner, but relinquished control of the team to the league on August 23, 2010, in a dispute over the league's ownership structure. The radio broadcast team of 2011 was handled by play-by-play Hampton Roads area veteran John Castleberry and colour by ex-USFL/NFL defensive lineman William Fuller who is a Chesapeake, Virginia native. Daily Press Paul White handled the local coverage in press and online. Former NFL and USFL quarterback Doug Williams later was named the team's general manager. On February 21, 2011, Williams resigned from the Destroyers to become the head coach at Grambling State University.

Joe Moglia, chairman of TD Ameritrade and a former college coordinator who last coached football on a paid basis in the 1980s, was given the head coaching position at the behest of league commissioner Michael Huyghue in November 2010; Williams had no input on the hire. However, in January 2011, the league announced Moglia would instead coach the Omaha Nighthawks.

Meanwhile, on January 12, 2011, the league announced that the Tuskers had ceased operations in Orlando and moved to Virginia, with Jay Gruden remaining as the Destroyers' coach. Bret Munsey, the Tuskers' director of player personnel, assumed authority over player personnel upon Williams' resignation. Theismann, a minority owner of the team in Florida, was relegated to being a consultant for the league but eventually left that role, expressing disgust in the way he was treated by the league's ownership during his time as the Tuskers' director of football operations. In February 2011, Gruden was hired by the Cincinnati Bengals of the NFL as their offensive coordinator.

On March 23, 2011, former NFL coach Marty Schottenheimer was hired as head coach and general manager.

On July 28, 2011, after unsuccessfully searching for another investor to replace the departures of Speros and Theismann, Bill Mayer was installed as owner of the Destroyers. Mayer had previously owned the New York Sentinels/Hartford Colonials in the UFL; that team was suspended at the same time (and eventually folded outright prior to the 2012 season). The league confirmed the contraction of the Colonials on August 10 and Mayer was installed as Destroyers' owner September 7.

==== 2012 season ====
Schottenheimer abruptly resigned shortly before the start of the 2012 season. Though failure to pay was a factor in his departure, it became known several years later that he was in the early stages of Alzheimer's disease. Kurt Schottenheimer, Marty's younger brother and longtime defensive assistant, was given the head coach position on September 18. The assistant coaches were Bret Munsey, Bill Lavoroni, Kurt Gouveia, and Terry Shea. The front office in 2012 was staffed by John Wuerhmann and Vice President of Sales John Castleberry, who was also the play-by-play broadcaster in 2011. Print journalists included Paul White of the Hampton Daily Press; Tom Robinson covered the Destroyers (albeit in an often disparaging manner) for The Virginian-Pilot.

After a promising 2011 season in which the Destroyers drew over 12,000 fans to all three home games, attendance plummeted in 2012, prompted in part by uncertainty over whether the league would even play their 2012 season. The team's second home game was so poorly attended that the league refused to release an attendance total for the first and only time in league history. On the field, the team's performance also suffered, tying for last place in the league at the time of the league's suspension.

== Season-by-season records ==
UFL Champions

Season	Team	League	Regular season				Playoff results	Awards
Season	Team	League	Finish	Wins	Losses	Ties	Playoff results	Awards
Florida Tuskers
2009	2009	UFL	1st	6	0	0	Lost UFL championship game (Las Vegas) 23–20 (OT)	
2010	2010	UFL	2nd	5	3	0	Lost UFL championship game (Las Vegas) 20–17	
Virginia Destroyers
2011	2011	UFL	1st	3	1	0	Won UFL championship game (1) (Las Vegas) 17–3	Marty Schottenheimer 2011 UFL Coach of the Year; Aaron Rouse 2011 UFL championship game MVP; Dominic Rhodes 2011 UFL Offensive POY
2012	2012	UFL	3rd	1	3	0	did not qualify	
Total				15	7	0	(2009–2012, includes only regular season)	
Total				1	2	0	(2009–2012, includes only playoffs)	
Total				16	9	0	(2009–2012, includes both regular season and playoffs)	

=== Records vs. teams ===
Team	Record	Percent
Hartford Colonials/New York Sentinels	4–0	1.000
Las Vegas Locomotives	5–4	.556
Omaha Nighthawks	3–0	1.000
Sacramento Mountain Lions/California Redwoods	4–3	.571

- Note: This includes postseason games.

=== Home, away, and neutral records ===
Location	Record	Percent
Home	8–2	.800
Away	7–3	.700
Neutral	0–2	.000

=== Starting quarterbacks ===
Season(s)	Regular season
Florida Tuskers
2009	Brooks Bollinger (6)
2010	Brooks Bollinger (5) / Chris Greisen (3)
Virginia Destroyers
2011	Chris Greisen (4)
2012	Chris Greisen (4)

Season(s)	Postseason
Florida Tuskers
2009	Brooks Bollinger (1)
2010	Chris Greisen (1)
Virginia Destroyers
2011	Chris Greisen (1)

== See also ==
- United Football League
