= Las Vegas Locomotives =

American football team of the United Football League

Helmet
Logo

General information
- Founded: 2009
- Folded: 2012
- Stadium: Sam Boyd Stadium (2009–2012)
- Headquartered: Las Vegas, Nevada
- Colors: Metallic Silver, Locos Red, Black, White

Personnel
- Owners: Bill Hambrecht & Rob Ryan
- Head coach: Jim Fassel

Nickname
- "Locos"

League / conference affiliations
- United Football League

Championships
- League championships: 2; 2009, 2010

The Las Vegas Locomotives (called the Locos for short) were a professional American football team based in Las Vegas, Nevada that played in the United Football League. The team played their home games at Sam Boyd Stadium, home field for the University of Nevada, Las Vegas. Jim Fassel was the franchise's head coach, president, and general manager. The Locomotives appeared in all three UFL championship games, winning both the 2009 and 2010 iterations; the Locos were also the last of the four charter UFL franchises to remain in their original home city, to retain their original head coach, and to have played all of their home games at the same venue.

== Franchise history ==
Las Vegas was one of the first markets to be considered for a UFL team, being mentioned as a location from the beginning. When the league released their tentative list of six markets for their inaugural season in early 2008, it included Las Vegas, Los Angeles, New York, Hartford, Orlando, and San Francisco. When the league contracted to four teams prior to the start of the 2009 season, Las Vegas merged with Los Angeles, while New York merged with Hartford. Eventually, despite New York and Los Angeles being the larger markets, Las Vegas and Hartford were given sole rights to the teams, and Las Vegas never played a game in the Los Angeles metro area.

=== 2009 season ===
Las Vegas was awarded a franchise for the inaugural season of the UFL in 2009. The team named Jim Fassel as head coach. Fassel led his team to a 4–2 record in his first season. In the 2009 UFL championship game, the Locos defeated the then-undefeated Florida Tuskers to become the league's first champions.

=== 2010 season ===
Prior to the 2010 season, head coach Jim Fassel added the title of general manager, replacing league-wide general manager Rick Mueller, who handled the duties in 2009. The team also made a small tweak to their color scheme with red replacing the league-standard teal color in the trim of the logo for the 2010 season. On November 27, 2010, the Locomotives won their second UFL championship, again beating the Florida Tuskers with a final score of 23-20.

=== 2011 season ===
Prior to the 2011 season, head coach and general manager Jim Fassel added the title of team president. Fassel assumed more authority over the team as part of the league's efforts to transform their original top-down business model into one in which teams are given more authority over their own operations. Among the reforms Fassel implemented was an increase in direct marketing and the establishment of the league's first team-run Web site separate from the main UFL Web site. The move initially doubled the team's season ticket base.

Despite the gain in season ticket base, the Locomotives drew only 6,500 fans to their first home game, which was a factor in the league deciding to cut their season short and cancel the Locomotives' two remaining games.

=== 2012 season ===
The increasingly poor attendance at Sam Boyd Stadium jeopardized the Locomotives' future in Las Vegas. Hambrecht openly considered relocating the team to Salt Lake City, Utah, setting a late January deadline for his decision. On January 31, 2012, Hambrecht announced (the same day the league commissioner resigned) that, should the fall 2012 season go on, the Locomotives would stay in Las Vegas. The league also considered moving to Cashman Field, the home of the minor-league baseball Las Vegas 51s, but the team returned to Sam Boyd Stadium for the first two games in 2012.

By the start of the 2012 season, the Locomotives proved to be the best team on the field in the UFL, decisively winning their first two contests against Virginia and Omaha. However, the Locomotives' off-field problems were becoming even worse. According to official figures, only 2,500 fans arrived at Sam Boyd Stadium for the first contest, followed by a paltry 601 fans at the start of the second contest, the worst attendance for a league of the UFL's caliber in modern professional football history. In both cases, the actual attendance was reportedly even smaller. Both games were held early on Wednesday evenings, which may have held down attendance. With already low attendance numbers dropping further across the league, the UFL suspended operations four weeks into the season, never to return.

On January 16, 2013, the majority of the Locomotives' roster filed a class-action lawsuit against Hambrecht for unpaid salaries. The lawsuit was ultimately successful, although Hambrecht still has not paid the salaries.

== Season-by-season records ==
2009 Locos logo

UFL Champions

| Season | Team | League | Regular season | | | | Playoff results | Awards |
| Season | Team | League | Finish | Wins | Losses | Ties | Playoff results | Awards |
|---|---|---|---|---|---|---|---|---|
Las Vegas Locomotives
| 2009 | 2009 | UFL | 2nd | 4 | 2 | 0 | Won UFL championship game (Florida Tuskers) 23-20 (OT) | Championship game MVP – DeDe Dorsey |
| 2010 | 2010 | UFL | 1st | 5 | 3 | 0 | Won UFL championship game (Florida Tuskers) 20-17 | Championship game MVP – Chase Clement |
| 2011 | 2011 | UFL | 2nd | 3 | 1 | 0 | Lost UFL championship game (Virginia Destroyers) 17-3 | |
| 2012 | 2012 | UFL | 1st | 4 | 0 | 0 | Season cancelled | |
| Total | | | | 16 | 6 | 0 | (2009–2012), includes only regular season) | |
| Total | | | | 2 | 1 | 0 | (2009–2011, includes only playoffs) | |
| Total | | | | 18 | 7 | 0 | (2009–2012, includes both regular season and playoffs) | |

| Opponent | Wins | Losses | Pct. |
|---|---|---|---|
| Virginia Destroyers | 4 | 5 | .444 |
| Hartford Colonials | 3 | 1 | .750 |
| Omaha Nighthawks | 4 | 0 | 1.000 |
| Sacramento Mountain Lions | 4 | 1 | .800 |

=== Home, away and neutral records ===
| Location | Wins | Losses | Pct. |
|---|---|---|---|
| Home | 4 | 3 | .571 |
| Away | 5 | 2 | .714 |
| Neutral | 2 | 1 | .666 |

=== Starting quarterbacks ===
Regular season

| Season(s) | Quarterback(s) | Notes | Ref |
|---|---|---|---|
| 2009 | J. P. Losman (3–2) / Tim Rattay (1–0) | | |
| 2010 | Tim Rattay (3–1) / Drew Willy (2–1) / Chase Clement (0–1) | | |
| 2011 | Chase Clement (3–1) | | |
| 2012 | Chase Clement (4–0) | | |

Postseason

| Season(s) | Quarterback(s) | Notes | Ref |
|---|---|---|---|
| 2009 | J. P. Losman (1–0) | | |
| 2010 | Chase Clement (1–0) | MVP | |
| 2011 | Chase Clement (0–1) | | |

== Logos and uniforms ==
In the inaugural 2009 season, all teams were to adopt color schemes from the UFL logo. The Locos were given silver as their primary color. They would wear silver helmets on both road and home, with silver jerseys at home and white on the road. The Locos also wore blue pants.

For the 2010 season, teams were able to change their colors. The Locos kept the silver, but replaced the UFL blue with UNLV red. In an attempt to "match with their environment", the Locos adapted the main color scheme of the stadium into their uniforms, emulating the colors of UNLV. The Locos had red jerseys at home and white on the road, with silver pants.
