= 2009 UFL season =

American football league season

2009 United Football League season

Regular season
- Duration: October 8, 2009 – November 20, 2009

2009 UFL Championship Game
- Date: November 27, 2009
- Site: Sam Boyd Stadium, Whitney, Nevada
- Champion: Las Vegas Locomotives
- Runner-up: Florida Tuskers

The 2009 United Football League season—referred to by the professional American football league as the UFL Premiere Season—was the inaugural season of the United Football League. The regular season featured 4 teams playing 6 games each (twice against each of the other teams), and both began and ended at Sam Boyd Stadium in Las Vegas. Sam Boyd Stadium was the site of the 2009 UFL Championship Game on November 27, a game that saw the Locomotives defeat the previously unbeaten Florida Tuskers 20–17 in overtime.

== Pre-season and off-field preparations ==
Preparations for the UFL Premiere Season kicked off in the summer with player signings and a draft. Training camps for the players began on September 9 in Casa Grande, Arizona for the Western teams and September 10 in Orlando, Florida for the Eastern teams.

The league announced its game schedule in the first week of August, a schedule that features games in teams' primary cities as well as secondary sites (a few of which are potential future UFL homes). Certain game sites were not finalized, however, and changes were made both before the schedule's release and after play had begun:

- The season opener, originally planned for San Francisco, was played instead in Las Vegas.
- James M. Shuart Stadium in Hempstead, New York was considered a probable game venue before the schedule's release, but the league did not set a game for that site until moving the New York Sentinels' November 4 home game that was originally set for Citi Field in Flushing, a move that was announced on October 22.
- Sacramento's Hornet Stadium and San Jose's Spartan Stadium were also mentioned as potential playing venues. The league did not choose Hornet Stadium for a site in 2009, and did not set a game for Spartan Stadium until moving the Redwoods' November 14 home game from AT&T Park, a move also announced on October 22. (The Redwoods would relocate permanently to Sacramento in 2010.)
- The November 20th regular season finale, originally set for Home Depot Center in the Los Angeles area, a candidate for UFL expansion in 2010, was moved back to Sam Boyd Stadium, the Las Vegas Locomotives' regular home. It was the first of the in-season venue change announcements made by the league, which publicized the change during week 2 of the season.
- Secondary market games were played as scheduled at Tropicana Field in St. Petersburg, where Florida defeated Las Vegas on October 30, and Rentschler Field in Hartford, where the Tuskers defeated New York on November 12. (The New York Sentinels moved to Hartford following the 2009 season.)

During the week of August 10, the four team names and their uniform jerseys were revealed. Each of the uniforms (and the team logos and helmets that were unveiled on October 2) incorporated the UFL's signature color scheme into their designs, including silver (primary color for the Las Vegas Locomotives), blue (Florida Tuskers), black (New York Sentinels), and lime green and white (California Redwoods). Each of the team jerseys had the same design template, complete with a horizontal arc across the top front that resembles the arc on the UFL's logo.

== Regular season ==
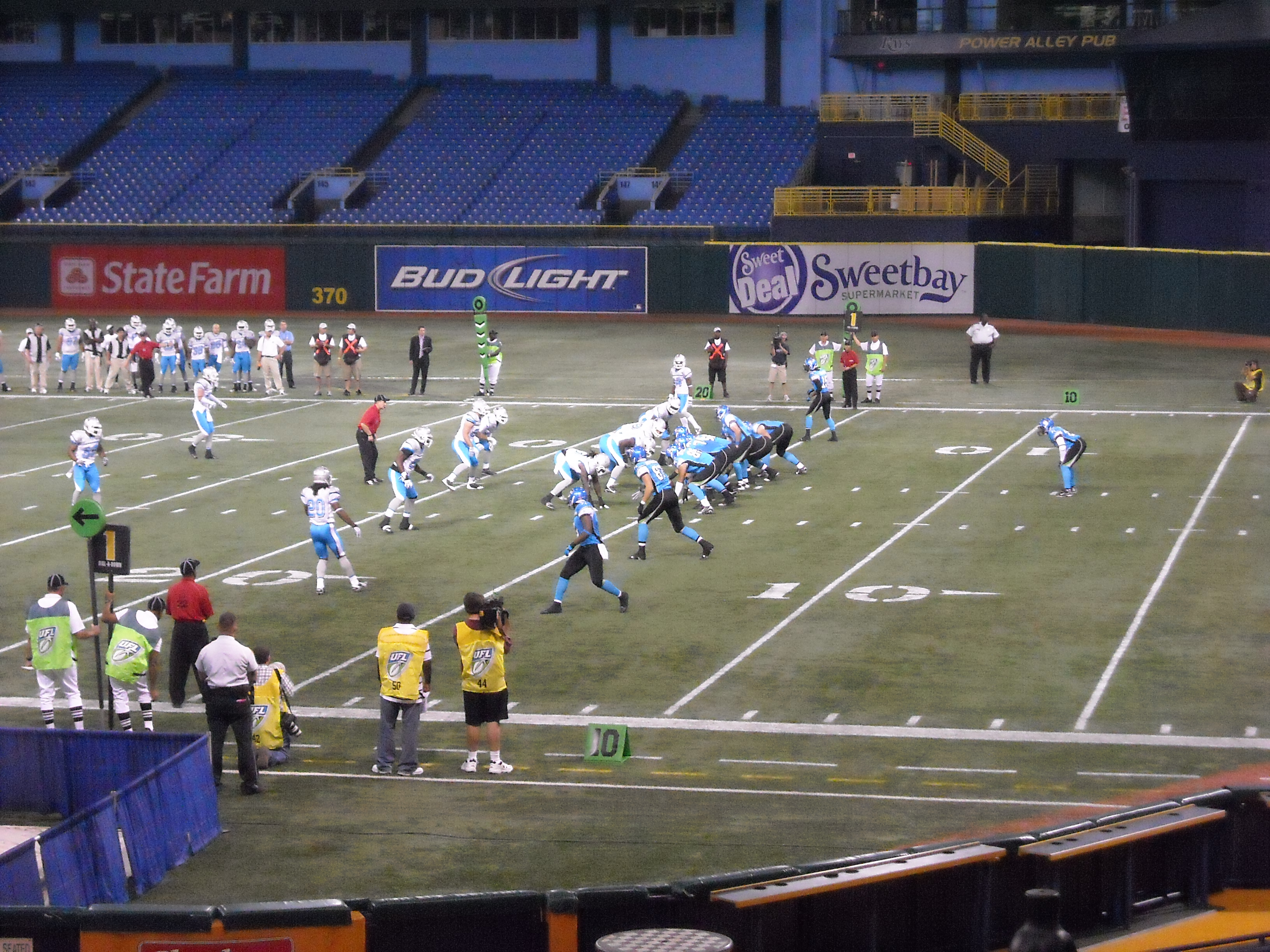
The Florida Tuskers (right) against the Las Vegas Locomotives (left) at Tropicana Field on October 30

The UFL launched play on October 8, 2009, with the Las Vegas Locomotives defeating the California Redwoods 30–17 at Sam Boyd Stadium in Las Vegas. Locos' kicker Graham Gano's 33-yard field goal with 3:20 remaining in the 1st quarter were the first points in league history, while a 5-yard run by Redwoods' quarterback Shane Boyd was the league's first touchdown. The Locos, who trailed 14–3 at one point in the 2nd quarter, rallied for the win via 2 touchdown passes by quarterback J. P. Losman.

The top team during the regular season was the Florida Tuskers; with a roster of players including quarterback Brooks Bollinger and receiver Taye Biddle, the Tuskers finished the season with a perfect 6–0 record, officially securing a berth in the UFL Championship Game with an October 30 win over Las Vegas. The Locomotives clinched 2nd place and the other title game spot with a November 14 win over California.

=== Attendance ===
Sparsely attended games were a noticeable part of the UFL's regular season, with announced crowds ranging from as low as 4,312 for California's November 14 home game in San Jose to as high as 18,187 for the October 8 inaugural game in Las Vegas, (though media observers at the game suggested the actual in-house attendance for that first game was considerably less). The twelve regular-season contests drew a total of 116,132 fans, or an average of 9,678 a game. Florida led the league in average attendance (13,225), while California (5,836) and New York (6,637), hampered in part by shifts in game sites and competing in major markets with an NFL presence, brought up the rear in attendance average. Further, two New York home games were held the same nights as Games 2 and 6 of the 2009 World Series, featuring the New York Yankees. Other factors—including the lack of a season ticket package, large-scale college football in Florida, the death of UConn football player Jasper Howard and Tim Lincecum's Cy Young Award press conference just prior to a Redwoods home game—hampered attendance severely.

Though Florida Tuskers' coach Jim Haslett was among those expressing some disappointment in the league's marketing approach for the season (a possible cause of low attendance), league commissioner Michael Huyghue was among league and team executives who countered that rather than heavily marketing the UFL, the league's premiere season was meant to be a "dress rehearsal"—start small, promote modestly, emphasize quality of product, and take the results and lessons learned from the season in determining the league's plans for 2010 and beyond.

==== Chart ====
Team	Wk 1	Wk 2	Wk 3	Wk 4	Wk 5	Wk 6	Wk 7	Total	Avg
California Redwoods	—	6,341	—	—	—	4,312	6,837	17,490	5,830
Florida Tuskers	11,203	—	12,021	11,354	—	—	—	34,578	11,526
Las Vegas Locomotives	18,187	12,160	—	—	—	—	13,306	43,653	14,551
New York Sentinels	—	—	—	10,818	4,392	5,201	—	20,411	6,804
League total	29,390	18,501	12,021	22,172	4,392	9,513	20,143	116,132	—
League avg	14,695	9,251	12,021	11,086	4,392	4,757	10,072	—	9,678

== Standings ==
United Football League
	W	L	T	PCT	PF	PA	STK
y-Florida Tuskers	6	0	0	1.000	183	92	W6
y-Las Vegas Locomotives	4	2	0	.667	167	100	W3
California Redwoods	2	4	0	.333	105	134	L2
New York Sentinels	0	6	0	.000	56	185	L6

y-denotes team advanced to 2009 UFL championship game

== Championship game ==
The UFL's Premiere Season concluded on November 27, 2009 (one day after Thanksgiving) with the championship game at Sam Boyd Stadium in Las Vegas. The matchup between the Florida Tuskers and Las Vegas Locomotives was dominated by defense until the 4th quarter, when a total of 24 points were scored, highlighted by 2 touchdown runs by Locos running back DeDe Dorsey. A 33-yard field goal by Graham Gano in overtime (the first overtime game in UFL history) gave Las Vegas the championship (and denied Florida an undefeated season) by a 20–17 score. The final score of the game was set up by a Locos takeaway deep in Tusker territory on Florida's first overtime possession.

Date	Kickoff	Teams	Final score	Game site	Attendance	TV
Friday, November 27	3:00 p.m. ET	Las Vegas Locomotives vs. Florida Tuskers	Las Vegas, 20–17 (OT)	Sam Boyd Stadium	14,801	Versus

== Statistics and awards ==
=== Statistical leaders ===
Note: Statistical numbers cover both the regular season and Championship Game

Team
Points scored	Florida Tuskers (234)
Total yards gained	Florida Tuskers (2,604)
Rushing yards	Las Vegas Locomotives (761)
Passing yards	Florida Tuskers (1,898)
Fewest points allowed	Las Vegas Locomotives (117)
Fewest total yards allowed	California Redwoods (1,766)
Fewest rushing yards allowed	California Redwoods (496)
Fewest passing yards allowed	New York Sentinels (1,187)
Individual
Scoring	Graham Gano, Las Vegas (59 points)
Touchdowns	DeDe Dorsey, Las Vegas (6 TDs)
Most field goals made	Graham Gano, Las Vegas (13 FGs in 16 attempts)
Rushing yards	Cory Ross, California (462)
Passing touchdowns	Brooks Bollinger, Florida (16 TDs)
Passing yards	Brooks Bollinger, Florida (1,825)
Pass receptions	Taye Biddle, Florida (30)
Pass receiving yards	Taye Biddle, Florida (525)
Punt returns	Willie Andrews, Florida (14 returns for 164 yards, 11.7 yard average)
Kickoff returns	B. J. Sams, California (22 returns for 375 yards, 17.0 yard average)
Interceptions	Nick Turnbull, Las Vegas (3)
Punting	Danny Baugher, Las Vegas (30 punts for 1,301 yards, 43.4 yard average)
Tackles	Teddy Lehman, Las Vegas (43.5)
Sacks	Darrion Scott, Florida (3.5)

=== Awards ===
- Motorola Season MVP: Brooks Bollinger, Quarterback, Florida Tuskers
- Men's Wearhouse Coach of the Year: Jim Haslett, Florida Tuskers

== See also ==
- United Football League (2009–2012)
- UFL premiere season draft
