= 2006 Pittsburgh Steelers season =

Pittsburgh Steelers 74th US football season

- Owner: The Rooney Family
- General manager: Kevin Colbert
- Head coach: Bill Cowher
- Offensive coordinator: Ken Whisenhunt
- Defensive coordinator: Dick LeBeau
- Home stadium: Heinz Field

Results
- Record: 8–8
- Division place: 3rd AFC North
- Playoffs: Did not qualify
- All-Pros: Alan Faneca (1st team)
- Pro Bowlers: 4: G Alan Faneca; NT Casey Hampton; RB Willie Parker; SS Troy Polamalu
- Team MVP: Willie Parker
- Team ROY: Santonio Holmes

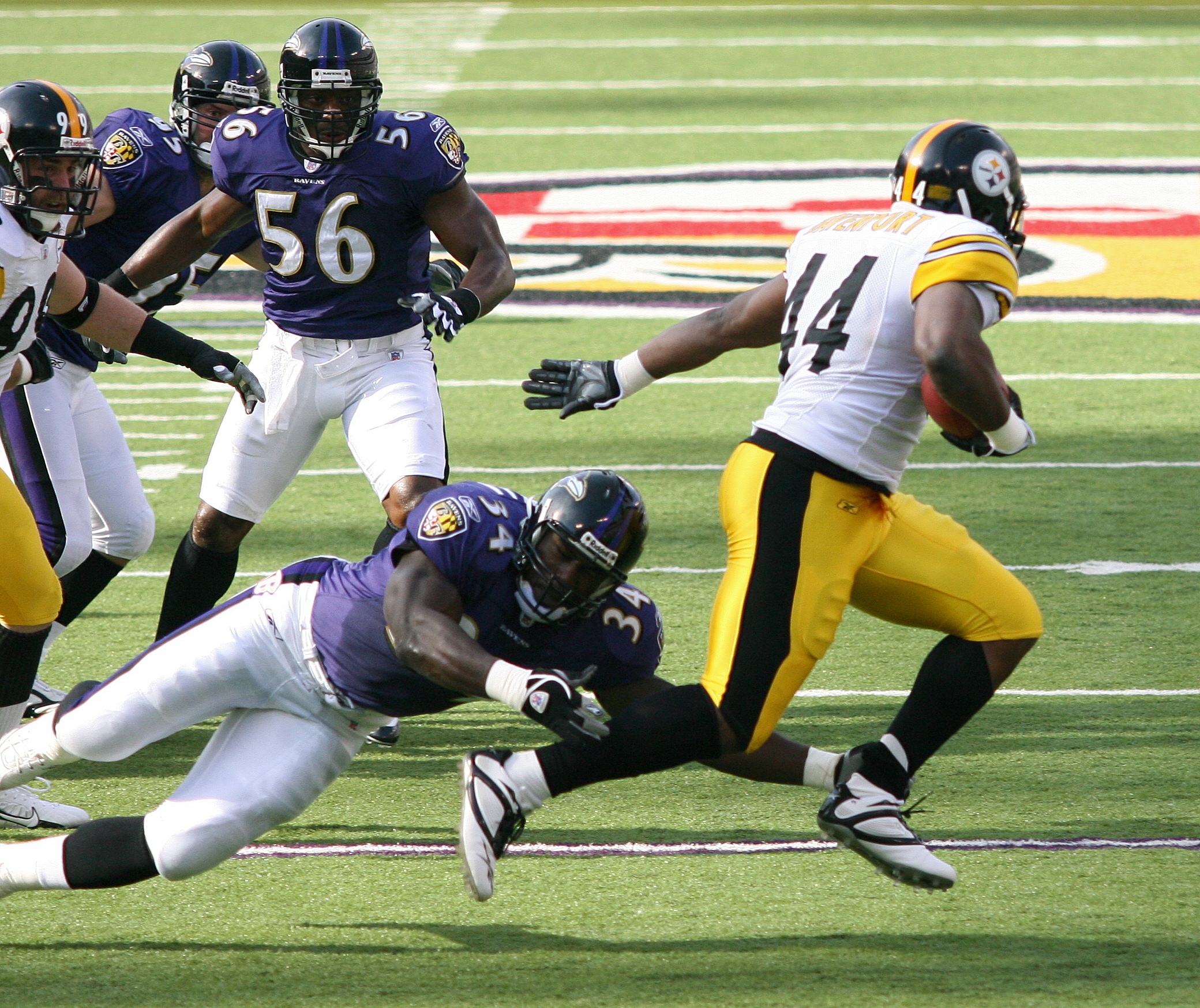
Steelers' running back Najeh Davenport against the Baltimore Ravens, 2006.

The 2006 Pittsburgh Steelers season was the franchise's 74th season as a professional sports franchise and as a member of the National Football League (NFL). It was the 7th season under the leadership of general manager Kevin Colbert and the 15th and last under head coach Bill Cowher, as he retired on January 5, 2007. The team failed to improve on their 11–5 record from 2005 and also failed to defend their Super Bowl XL championship, Instead, they finished the season with an 8–8 record and missed the playoffs for the first time since 2003. In the first half of the season, the Steelers record was 2–6. However, the team dramatically improved during the second half of the season, flipping their record from the first eight games and going 6–2 in their last eight.

This was the first season since 1995 that Jerome Bettis was not on the opening day roster, as he retired after Super Bowl 40.

== Personnel ==
=== Staff ===
2006 Pittsburgh Steelers staff
Front office: Chairman – Daniel M. Rooney; President – Arthur J. Rooney II; Vice president – John R. McGinley; Vice president – Arthur J. Rooney, Jr.; Administration advisor – Chuck Noll; Administrative assistant – Diane Lowe; Administrative assistant – Janet Rusnak; Business office; Director of business – Mark Hart; Controller – Jim Ellenberger; Human relations/office coordinator – Geraldine Glenn; Business operations coordinator – Omar Khan; Accounting manager – Jodie Spagnolli; Payroll/benefits administrator – Meghan Matesa; Administrative assistant – Rebecca Mihalcik; Administrative assistant – Kelly Serafin; Media relations; Communications coordinator – Dave Lockett; Public relations/media manager – Burt Lauten; Administrative assistant – Vicky Iuni; Intern – Sam Kasan; Community relations; Community relations manager – Michele Rosenthal; Administrative assistant – Stacie Lawrence; Photography; Team photographer – Mike Fabus; Intern – Karl Roser; Information technology; Information technology administrator – Scott Phelps; Intern – Jon Pugliano; Steelers.com/Steelers Digest; Editor – Bob Labriola; Assistant editor/website – Teresa Varley; Football operations; Director of football operations – Kevin Colbert; Pro scouting coordinator – Doug Whaley; College scouting coordinator – Ron Hughes; Special assistant/pro and college personnel – Joe Greene; Pro/college scout – Phil Kreidler; College scout – Mark Gorscak; College scout – Kelvin Fisher; College scout – Bruce McNorton; College scout – Dan Rooney; Blesto scout – David Petett; College personnel – Bill Nunn; Administrative assistant – Maureen Mannion; Administrative assistant – Karen Mercalde; Intern – Brandon Hunt; Head coaches: Head coach – Bill Cowher; Assistant head coach/offensive line – Russ Grimm; Offensive coaches: Offensive coordinator – Ken Whisenhunt; Quarterbacks – Mark Whipple; Running backs – Dick Hoak; Wide receivers – Bruce Arians; Tight ends – James Daniel; Offensive assistant – Matt Raich	Defensive coaches: Defensive coordinator – Dick LeBeau; Defensive line – John Mitchell; Linebackers – Keith Butler; Defensive backs – Darren Perry; Assistant defensive backs – Ray Horton; Defensive assistant – Lou Spanos; Special teams coaches: Special teams – Kevin Spencer; Strength and conditioning: Conditioning coach – Chet Fuhrman; Conditioning assistant – Marcel Pastoor; Player development – Raymond Jackson; Administrative assistant – Chrissy Bulger; Administrative assistant – Mia Daudet; Medical staff; Physician, orthopedic – Dr. James P. Bradley; Ophthalmologist – Dr. Francis Mah; Neurological surgeon – Dr. Joseph Maroon; Physician, M.D. – Dr. Richard Rydze; Physician, consultant – Dr. Abraham J. Twerski; Physician, M.D. – Dr. Anthony P. Yates; Athletic training staff; Head athletic trainer – John Norwig; Assistant athletic trainer – Ryan Grove; Assistant athletic trainer – Ariko Iso; Football equipment staff; Equipment manager – Rodgers Freyvogel; Field manager – Rich Baker; Video; Video coordinator – Bob McCartney; Video assistant – Andy Lizanich; Video assistant – Rob Brakel

Notable additions include Santonio Holmes, Ryan Clark and Willie Colon

== Offseason ==
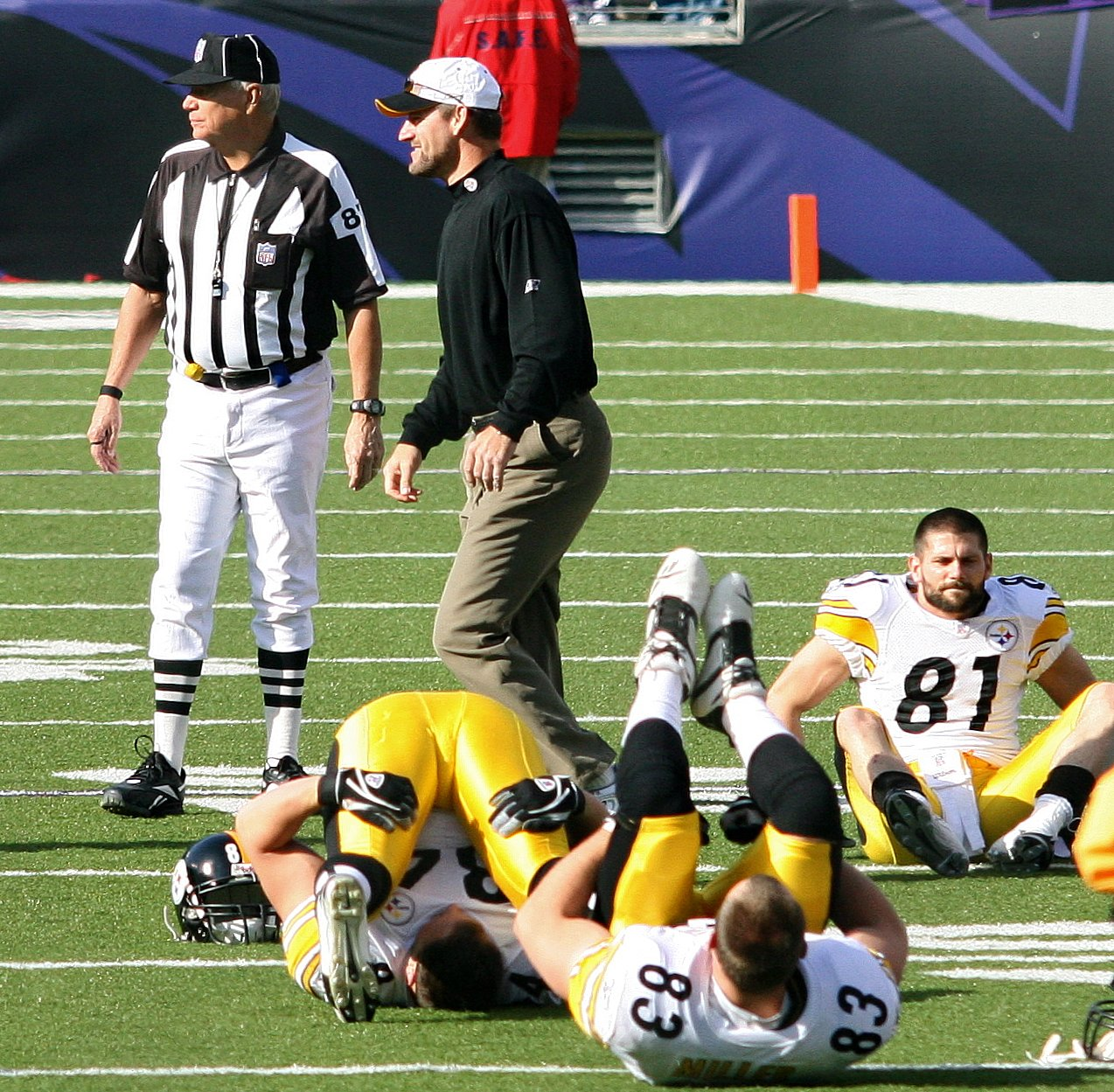
Bill Cowher and the Steelers before the Baltimore Ravens game on November 26

On March 3, 2006, backup quarterback Tommy Maddox and cornerback Willie Williams (a member of the Super Bowl XL Steelers team) were released for salary cap reasons. Later on, the team lost wide receiver Antwaan Randle El, defensive end Kimo von Oelhoffen, and free safety Chris Hope to free agency, but picked up safety Ryan Clark from the Washington Redskins.

The team used the 2006 NFL draft to fill in the remaining holes on the depth chart. In the first round, Pittsburgh traded up to select Ohio St. wide receiver Santonio Holmes. Then, they used their next pick (acquired from the Vikings) on Syracuse Safety Anthony Smith. The rest of their picks included Florida St. wide receiver Willie Reid, Hofstra guard Willie Colon, Miami University (Fl.) defensive end Orien Harris, Bowling Green quarterback Omar Jacobs, Purdue tight end Charles Davis, California center Marvin Philip, and Virginia Tech running back Cedric Humes.

On June 2, members of the Super Bowl Champion Steelers were invited to the White House to meet President George W. Bush in a celebration to honor the Steelers' successful 2005 season.

=== Ben Roethlisberger's motorcycle accident ===
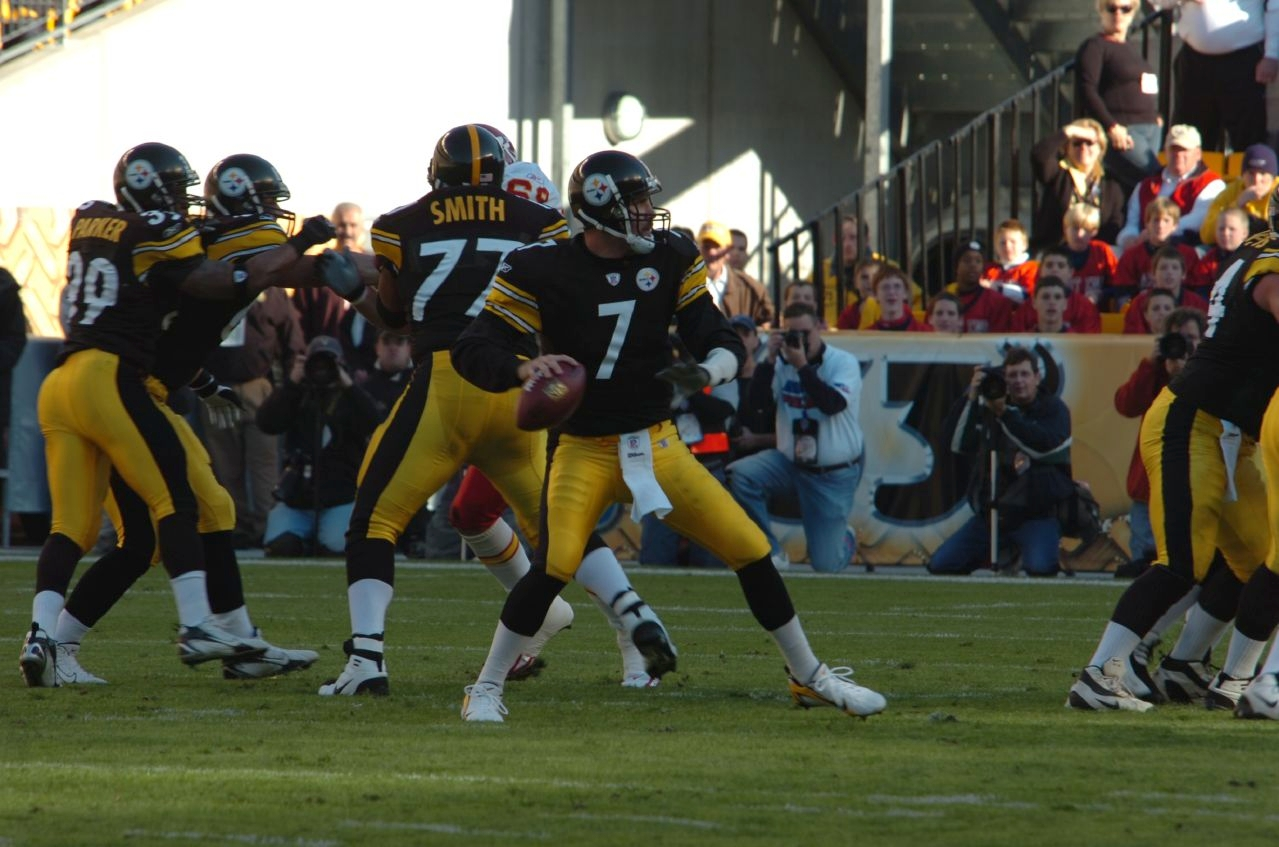
Roethlisberger in action against the Chiefs, October 15, 2006

On June 12, Ben Roethlisberger suffered a near-death accident while riding his motorcycle in downtown Pittsburgh. He was not at fault, and an out-of-state vehicle failed to yield and hit him. Ben reportedly was moments away from dying due to a cut artery, however medics stopped the bleeding in time.

This accident set Ben back for training camp and the preseason. However, he managed to play in part of the preseason games.

Shortly after the preseason, however, Ben required an emergency appendectomy, causing him to miss the season opener against the Miami Dolphins. Between both of these events, Ben reportedly lost 15 pounds and was not up to form with the team due to lack of practice time and time spent in camp. His health early in the year is pointed to as the cause for a rough season. He experienced continued problems against Atlanta in week 7. After throwing the ball, he was hit by multiple defenders, one of whom caused a helmet-to-helmet collision. Roethlisberger was diagnosed with a concussion, had to sit out the rest of the game, and appeared to have difficulties in the next two games against Oakland and Denver.

== 2006 NFL draft ==
2006 Pittsburgh Steelers draft
Round	Pick	Player	Position	College	Notes
1	25	Santonio Holmes	WR	Ohio State	
3	83	Anthony Smith	FS	Syracuse	
3	95	Willie Reid	WR	Florida State	
4	131	Willie Colon	T	Hofstra	
4	133	Orien Harris	NT	Miami	
5	164	Omar Jacobs	QB	Bowling Green	
5	167	Charles Davis	FB	Purdue	
6	201	Marvin Philip	G	California	
Made roster † Pro Football Hall of Fame * Made at least one Pro Bowl during career

== Preseason ==
=== Schedule ===
Week	Date	Kickoff (ET)	Opponent	Result	TV	Game Site	Record	NFL Recap
1	August 12	4:00 p.m.	at Arizona Cardinals	L 13–21	KDKA	University of Phoenix Stadium	0–1	
2	August 19	8:00 p.m.	Minnesota Vikings	L 10–17	KDKA	Heinz Field	0–2	
3	August 25	8:00 p.m.	at Philadelphia Eagles	L 7–16	ESPN	Lincoln Financial Field	0–3	
4	August 31	7:30 p.m.	Carolina Panthers	L 13–15	KDKA	Heinz Field	0–4	

== Regular season ==
=== Schedule ===
Week	Date	Opponent	Result	Record	Venue	Recap
1	September 7	Miami Dolphins	**W** 28–17	1–0	Heinz Field	Summary
2	September 18	at Jacksonville Jaguars	**L** 0–9	1–1	Alltel Stadium	Summary
3	September 24	**Cincinnati Bengals**	**L** 20–28	1–2	Heinz Field	Summary
4	October 1	Bye week				
5	October 8	at San Diego Chargers	**L** 13–23	1–3	Qualcomm Stadium	Summary
6	October 15	Kansas City Chiefs	**W** 45–7	2–3	Heinz Field	Summary
7	October 22	at Atlanta Falcons	**L** 38–41 (OT)	2–4	Georgia Dome	Summary
8	October 29	at Oakland Raiders	**L** 13–20	2–5	McAfee Coliseum	Summary
9	November 5	Denver Broncos	**L** 20–31	2–6	Heinz Field	Summary
10	November 12	New Orleans Saints	**W** 38–31	3–6	Heinz Field	Summary
11	November 19	at **Cleveland Browns**	**W** 24–20	4–6	Cleveland Browns Stadium	Summary
12	November 26	at **Baltimore Ravens**	**L** 0–27	4–7	M&T Bank Stadium	Summary
13	December 3	Tampa Bay Buccaneers	**W** 20–3	5–7	Heinz Field	Summary
14	December 7	**Cleveland Browns**	**W** 27–7	6–7	Heinz Field	Summary
15	December 17	at Carolina Panthers	**W** 37–3	7–7	Bank of America Stadium	Summary
16	December 24	**Baltimore Ravens**	**L** 7–31	7–8	Heinz Field	Summary
17	December 31	at **Cincinnati Bengals**	**W** 23–17 (OT)	8–8	Paul Brown Stadium	Summary

Note: Intra-divisional opponents are in bold text.

=== Week 1 roster ===
Pittsburgh Steelers 2006 Week 1 roster
**Quarterbacks**: 16 Charlie Batch; 7 Ben Roethlisberger; 2 Brian St. Pierre; **Running backs**: -- Patrick Cobbs; 34 Verron Haynes; 35 Dan Kreider FB; 39 Willie Parker; 22 Duce Staley; **Wide receivers**: 10 Santonio Holmes; 81 Sean Morey; 15 Willie Reid; 86 Hines Ward; 85 Nate Washington; 80 Cedrick Wilson; **Tight ends**: 87 Tim Euhus; 83 Heath Miller; 84 Jerame Tuman	**Offensive linemen**: 74 Willie Colon T; 79 Trai Essex T; 66 Alan Faneca G; 64 Jeff Hartings C; 68 Chris Kemoeatu G; 56 Chukky Okobi C; 62 Marvin Philip G; 73 Kendall Simmons G; 77 Marvel Smith G; 78 Max Starks T; **Defensive linemen**: 93 Rodney Bailey DE; 98 Casey Hampton NT; 76 Chris Hoke NT; 99 Brett Keisel DE; 90 Travis Kirschke DE; 91 Aaron Smith DE	**Linebackers**: 51 James Farrior ILB; 50 Larry Foote ILB; 97 Arnold Harrison OLB; 92 James Harrison OLB; 53 Clark Haggans OLB; 57 Clint Kriewaldt ILB; 55 Joey Porter OLB; 54 Rian Wallace ILB; **Defensive backs**: 23 Tyrone Carter FS; 25 Ryan Clark FS; 21 Ricardo Colclough CB; 31 Mike Logan FS; 20 Bryant McFadden CB; 43 Troy Polamalu SS; 27 Anthony Smith FS; 24 Ike Taylor CB; 26 Deshea Townsend CB; **Special teams**: 3 Jeff Reed K; 17 Chris Gardocki P; 60 Greg Warren LS	**Reserve lists**: 69 Ulish Booker T (IR); 72 Barrett Brooks T (IR); 30 Cedric Humes HB (IR); **Practice squad**: 88 Jonathan Dekker TE; 71 Orien Harris DE; 42 John Kuhn FB; 4 Omar Jacobs QB; 37 Anthony Madison CB; 96 Shaun Nua NT; 74 Scott Paxson DE; 21 Kuan Sanchez RB; 47 Ronald Stanley OLB; 71 Brandon Torrey T; Rookies in italics; 53 Active, 3 Inactive, 9 Practice Squad

=== Game summaries ===
==== Week 1 (Thursday September 7, 2006): vs. Miami Dolphins ====
Quarter	1	2	3	4	Total
Dolphins	0	10	7	0	**17**
**Steelers**	0	14	0	14	**28**

at Heinz Field, Pittsburgh, Pennsylvania

- Game time: 8:15 p.m. EDT
- Game weather: 72 °F (22 °C) (Partly Cloudy)
- Game attendance: 64,927
- Referee: Walt Coleman
- TV announcers (NBC): Al Michaels (play by play), John Madden (color commentator), Andrea Kremer (sideline reporter)

The Steelers opened the regular season in the annual Thursday NFL Kickoff game at home against the Miami Dolphins on September 7. The Steelers drew first blood in the second quarter with a 27-yard touchdown pass to Nate Washington. After the Dolphins tied the game up on a 1-yard touchdown run by Ronnie Brown, Super Bowl XL MVP Hines Ward caught a 7-yard TD pass in the back of the end zone. After a Miami field goal, the Steelers led 14–10 at halftime. In the second half, Miami running back Ronnie Brown scored on a four-yard touchdown run for the Dolphins' second touchdown in the third quarter. The Steelers rebounded as tight end Heath Miller caught an 87-yard pass for a touchdown and linebacker Joey Porter returned an interception 42 yards for a touchdown to give the Steelers a 28–17 victory. Steelers quarterback Charlie Batch completed 15 of 25 passes for 209 yards, and threw 3 touchdowns and no interceptions in the absence of Ben Roethlisberger for Pittsburgh, while the Dolphins' Daunte Culpepper completed 18 of 37 passes for 262 yards, with two interceptions (the first interception by Troy Polamalu, and the second to Joey Porter, who returned it for a touchdown) late in the fourth quarter. Batch dedicated the win to late Pittsburgh mayor Bob O'Connor, who was laid to rest earlier in the day. With the win, the Steelers improved to 1–0 and won their regular season opener for the 4th straight season. Stats

==== Week 2 (Monday September 18, 2006): at Jacksonville Jaguars ====
Quarter	1	2	3	4	Total
Steelers	0	0	0	0	**0**
**Jaguars**	0	0	3	6	**9**

at Alltel Stadium, Jacksonville, Florida

- Game time: 8:30 p.m. EDT
- Game weather: 86 °F (30 °C) (Clear)
- Game attendance: 67,164
- Referee: Terry McAulay
- TV announcers (ESPN): Mike Tirico (play by play), Joe Theismann & Tony Kornheiser (color commentators), Michele Tafoya & Suzy Kolber (sideline reporters)

The Steelers traveled to play the Jacksonville Jaguars on Monday night on September 18. Despite not allowing a touchdown, the Steelers gave up three field goals to the Jaguars, with Kicker Josh Scobee making a 31, a 32, and a 41-yard field goal. The Steelers were defeated 9–0. They became the first defending Super Bowl champion team to be shut out since the 1981 Oakland Raiders, and it was the lowest-scoring game in Monday Night Football history. With the shutout loss, the Steelers fell to 1–1. Stats

==== Week 3 (Sunday September 24, 2006): vs. Cincinnati Bengals ====
Quarter	1	2	3	4	Total
**Bengals**	0	14	0	14	**28**
Steelers	7	0	10	3	**20**

at Heinz Field, Pittsburgh, Pennsylvania

- Game time: 1:00 p.m. EDT
- Game weather: 70 °F (21 °C) (Partly Sunny)
- Game attendance: 64,922
- Referee: Jeff Triplette
- TV announcers (CBS): Jim Nantz (play by play), Phil Simms (color commentator)

The Steelers went back home for an AFC North fight against the Cincinnati Bengals. In the first quarter, running back Willie Parker scored on a 3-yard touchdown run. However, on the very first play of the second quarter, quarterback Ben Roethlisberger threw an interception and Cincinnati was able to score shortly after with quarterback Carson Palmer completing a 16-yard touchdown pass to wide receiver Chris Henry. On Cincinnati's next drive, the Bengals scored on a three-yard touchdown pass to Henry.

In the third quarter, the Steelers rallied a comeback, as kicker Jeff Reed kicked a 37-yard field goal. Shortly after, Parker scored on a one-yard touchdown run to give the Steelers a 17–14 lead. Pittsburgh's lead deteriorated as Ricardo Colclough muffed a punt, allowing the Bengals to recover. Carson Palmer then helped put Cincinnati ahead on 9-yard touchdown pass to T. J. Houshmandzadeh. Cincinnati was able to increase their lead when Pittsburgh's running back, Verron Haynes lost a fumble, allowing Palmer to complete a 30-yard touchdown pass to Houshmandzadeh on the next drive. Reed helped out Pittsburgh with a 36-yard field goal.

On the very last drive, the Steelers tried to fight back and tie the game, but the game ended as Roethlisberger was intercepted by DB Kevin Kaesviharn, eliminating any hope of a comeback. The Steelers headed into their bye week at 1–2. Stats

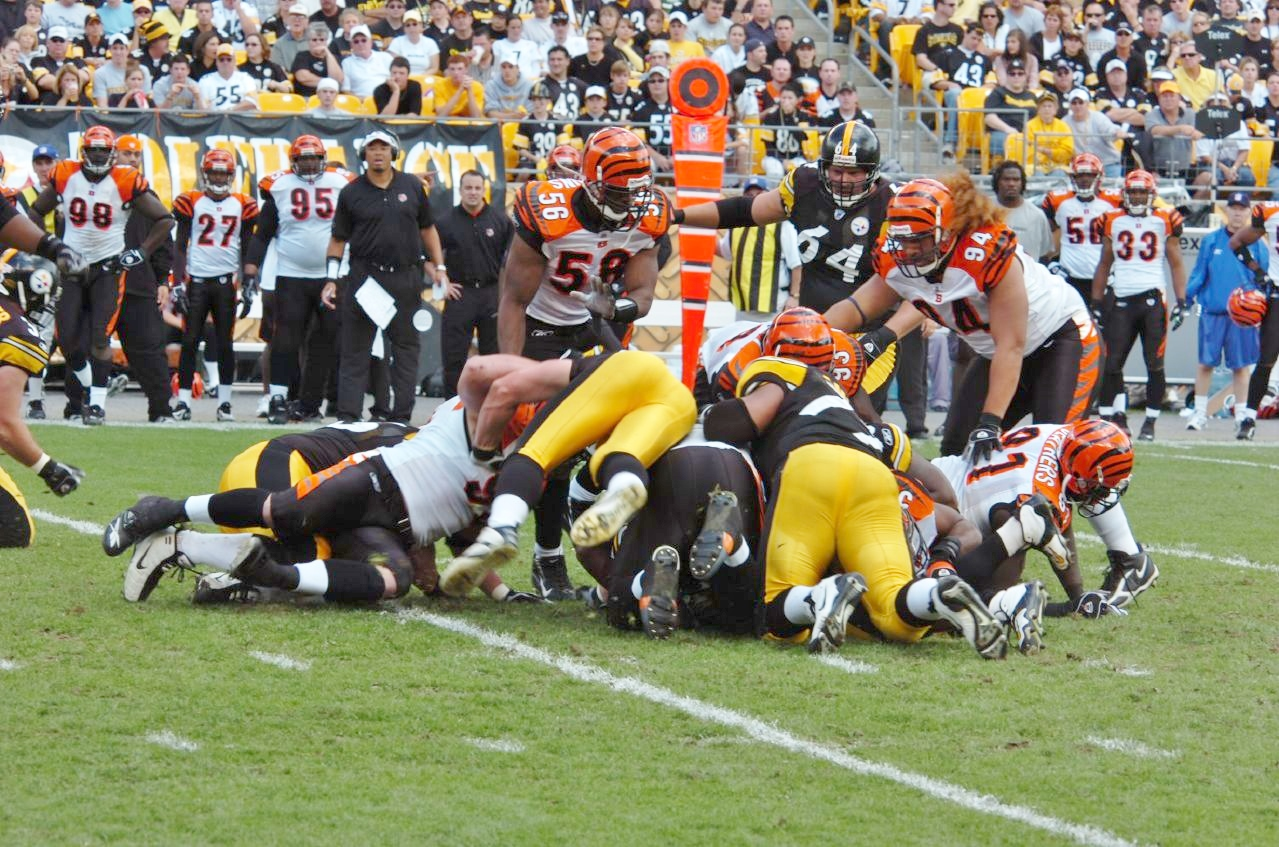
Pittsburgh on offense against the Bengals

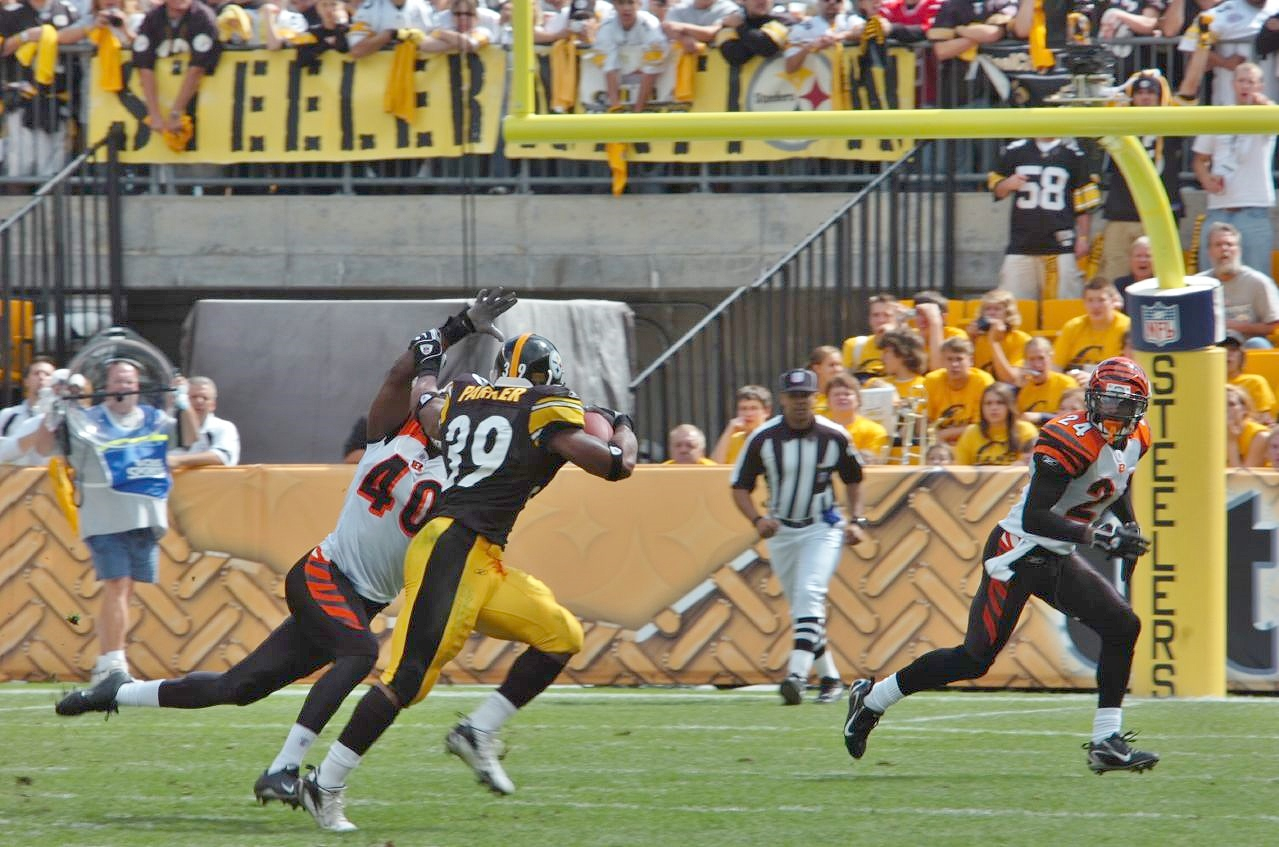
Willie Parker and Deltha O'Neal

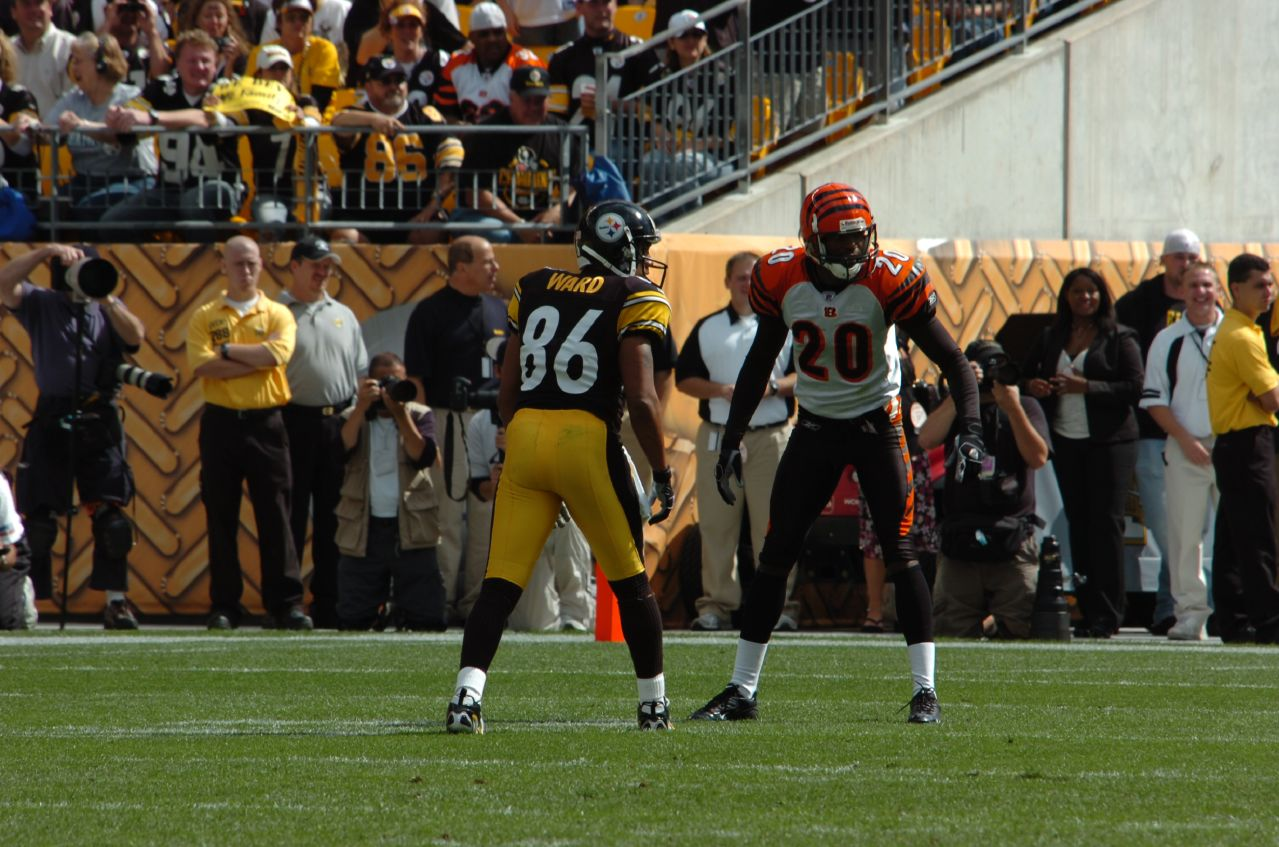
Hines Ward and Tory James

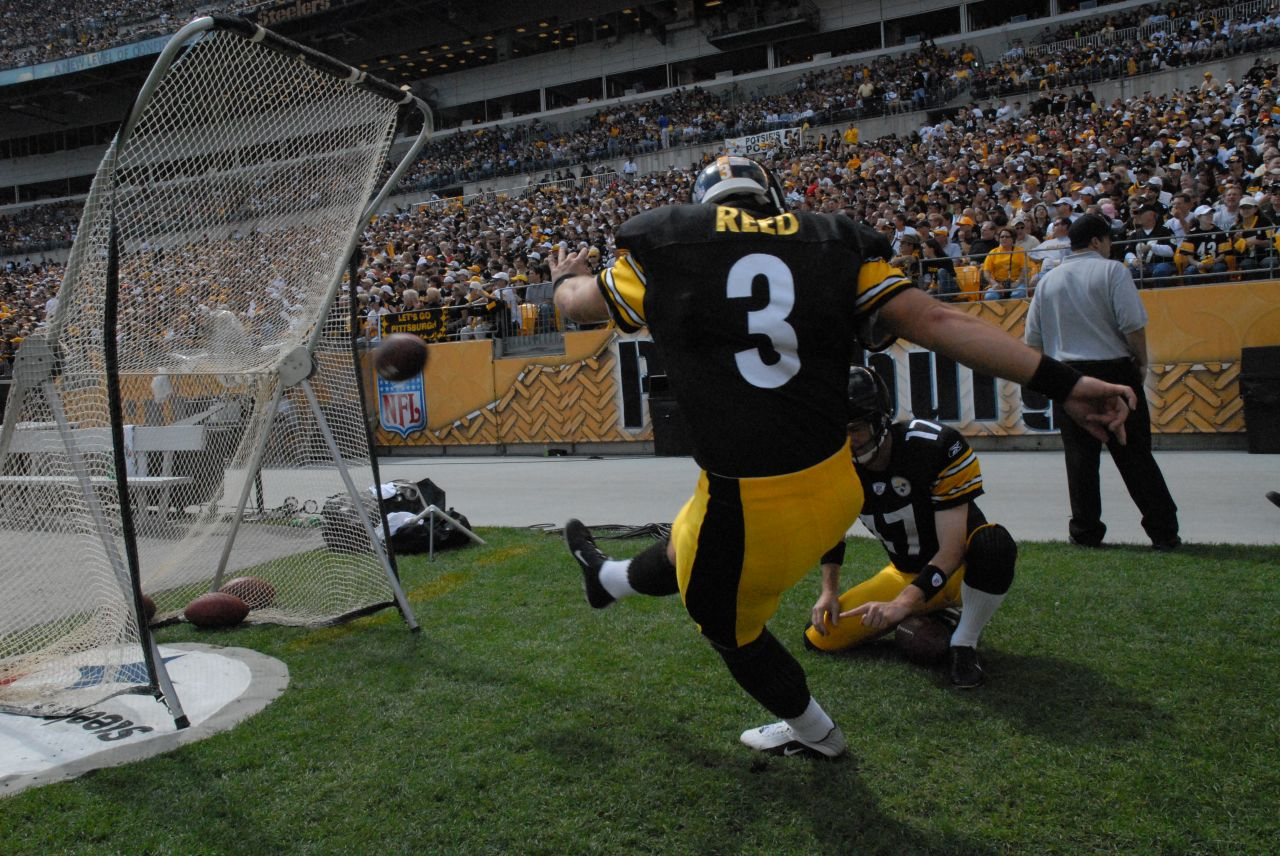
Kicker Jeff Reed warms up against Cincinnati

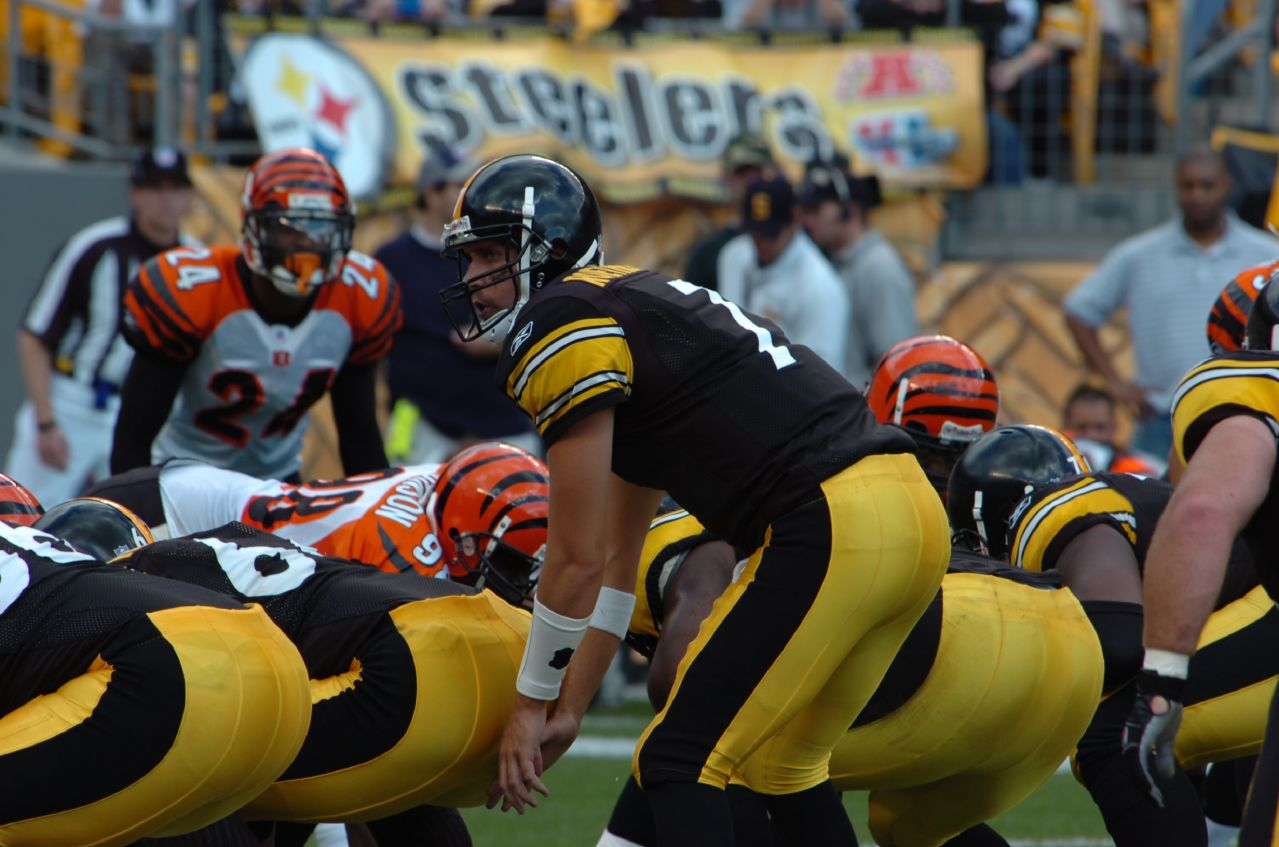
Cincinnati prepares to face a Ben Roethlisberger snap

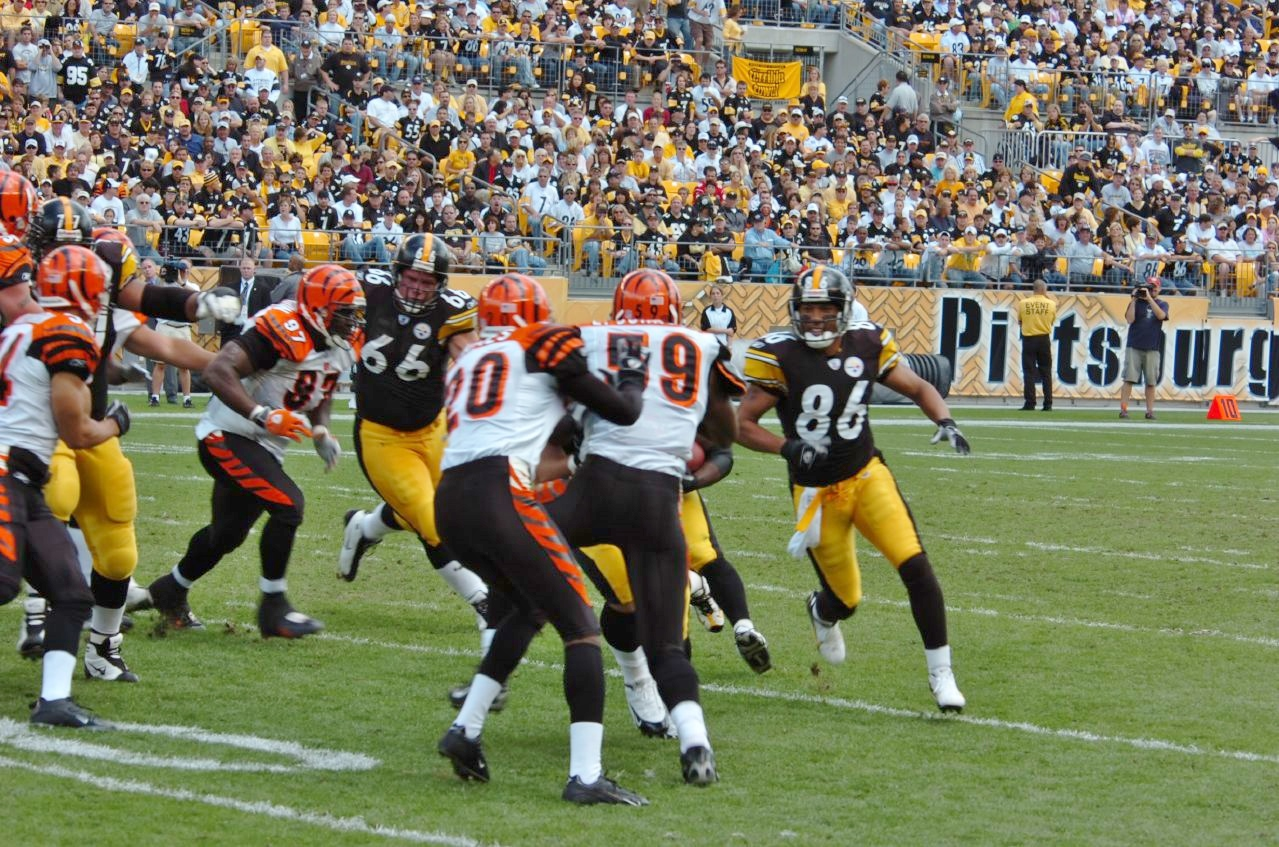
Pittsburgh with possession against Cincinnati

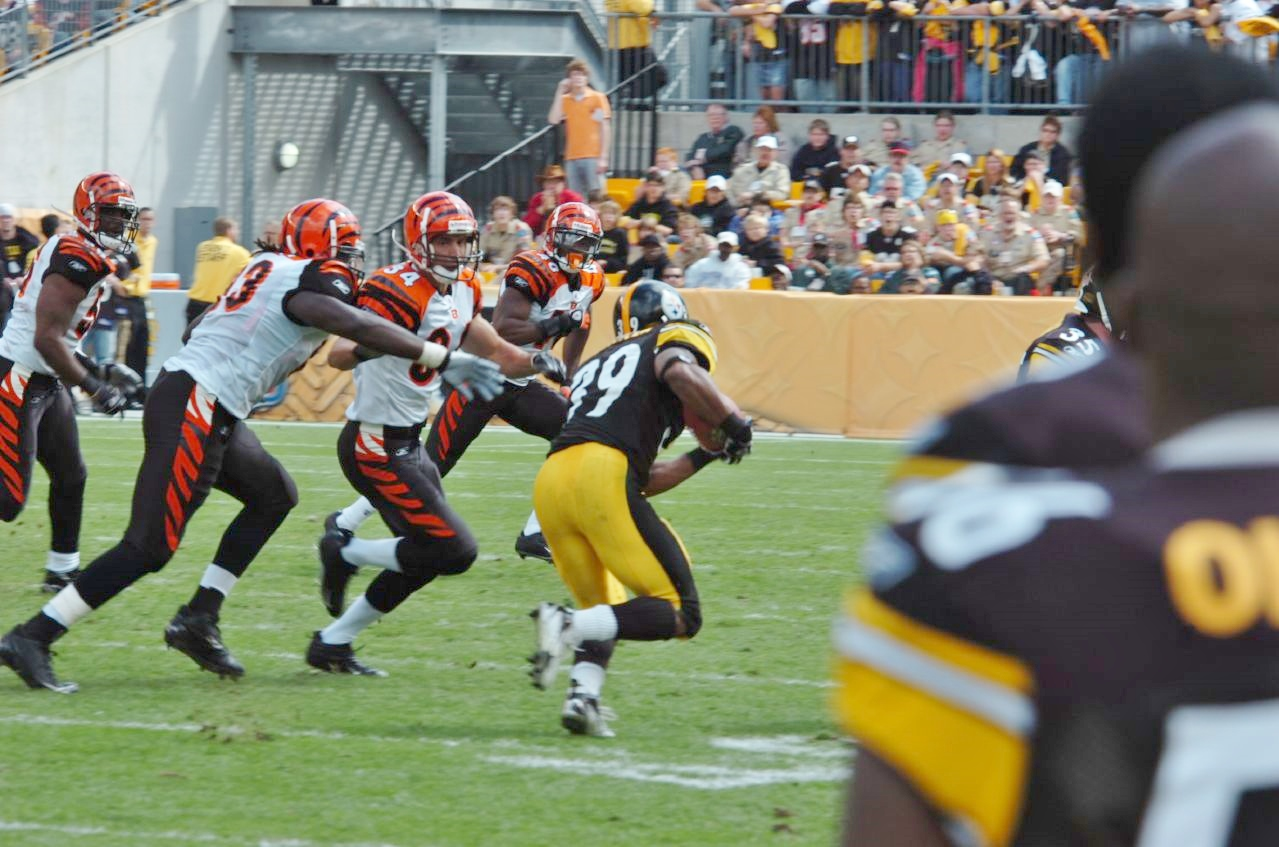
Willie Parker is pursued by the Bengals defense

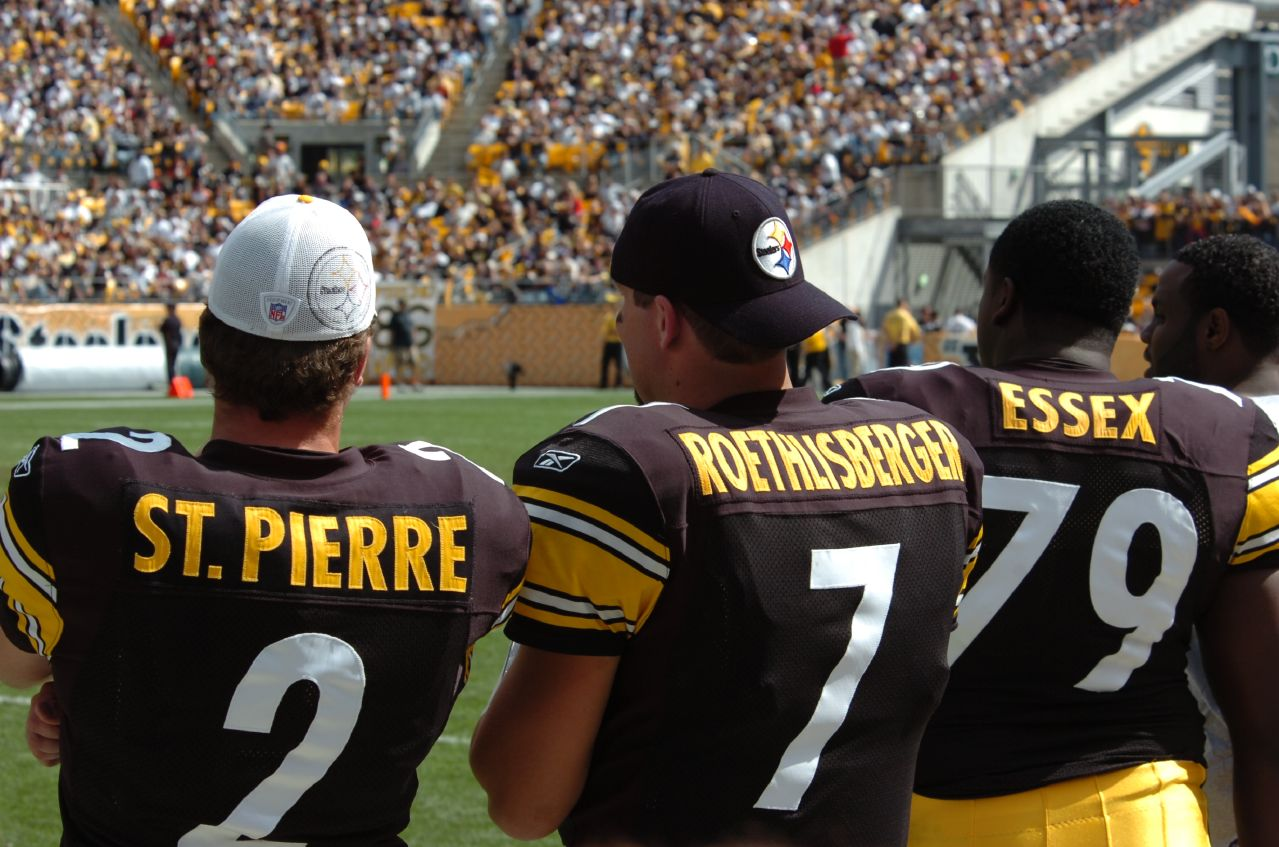
Ben Roethlisberger, Brian St. Pierre, and Trai Essex

==== Week 5 (Sunday October 8, 2006): at San Diego Chargers ====
Quarter	1	2	3	4	Total
Steelers	7	6	0	0	**13**
**Chargers**	0	7	10	6	**23**

at Qualcomm Stadium, San Diego, California

- Game time: 8:15 p.m. EDT
- Game weather: 72 °F (22 °C) (Clear)
- Game attendance: 67,837
- Referee: Bill Vinovich
- TV announcers (NBC): Al Michaels (play by play), John Madden (color commentator), Andrea Kremer (sideline reporter)

Hoping to end their two-game skid, the Steelers traveled to Qualcomm Stadium for a Sunday night match-up with the throwback-clad San Diego Chargers. Pittsburgh was able to capitalize early, as running back Willie Parker scored on a nine-yard touchdown run for the only score of the first quarter. In the second quarter, kicker Jeff Reed kicked a 39-yard field goal to give the Steelers a 10–0 lead. The Chargers cut the lead to a field goal when quarterback Philip Rivers completed a 9-yard TD pass to WR Malcom Floyd. Reed gave Pittsburgh a 13–7 halftime lead with a 44-yard field goal. The Steelers continued their recent struggles in the third quarter, as Charger kicker Nate Kaeding kicked a 28-yard field goal, while Rivers completed a 22-yard touchdown pass to tight end Antonio Gates. In the fourth quarter, Kaeding sealed a Charger victory as he kicked a 33-yard and a 22-yard field. With their third-straight loss, the Steelers became the first team since the 1999 Denver Broncos to start a season 1–3 or 0–4 after winning a Super Bowl in the previous year. Stats

==== Week 6 (Sunday October 15, 2006): vs. Kansas City Chiefs ====
Quarter	1	2	3	4	Total
Chiefs	0	0	7	0	**7**
**Steelers**	14	17	0	14	**45**

at Heinz Field, Pittsburgh, Pennsylvania

- Game time: 4:15 p.m. EDT
- Game weather: 49 °F (9 °C) (Sunny)
- Game attendance: 64,727
- Referee: Scott Green
- TV announcers (CBS): Greg Gumbel (play by play), Dan Dierdorf (color commentator)

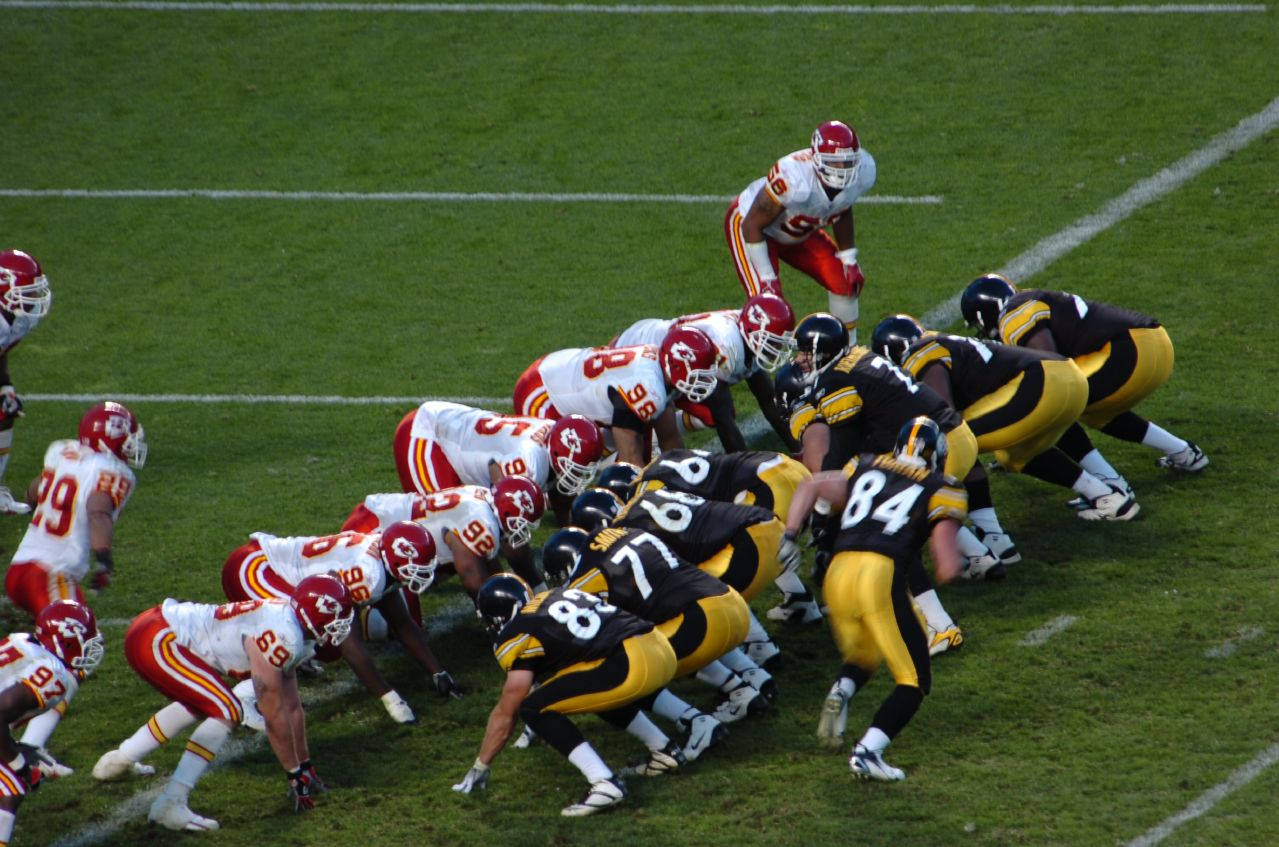
The Steelers and Chiefs line up on the goal line

Hoping to end their three-game losing skid, the Steelers went home for a Week 6 battle with the Kansas City Chiefs, who were visiting Pittsburgh for the first time since 1989. Pittsburgh dominated the entire game, as quarterback Ben Roethlisberger completed 16 of 19 passes, with 238 yards and two touchdowns. Running back Willie Parker ran 21 times for 109 yards and 2 TD's, while running back Najeh Davenport ran 12 times for 78 yards and a TD. Wide receiver Nate Washington caught three passes for 68 yards and a touchdown, while receiver Hines Ward caught five passes for 59 yards and a touchdown. Kicker Jeff Reed nailed a 32-yard field goal for himself, while back-up LB Rian Wallace returned an interception 30 yards for a touchdown. Chiefs running back Larry Johnson gave Kansas City their only score of the day on a two-yard touchdown run. Pittsburgh broke its three-game losing streak and improved to 2–3. Stats

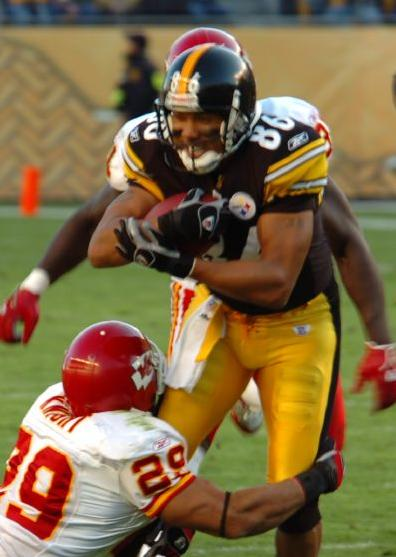
Hines Ward attempts to break an opponent's tackle

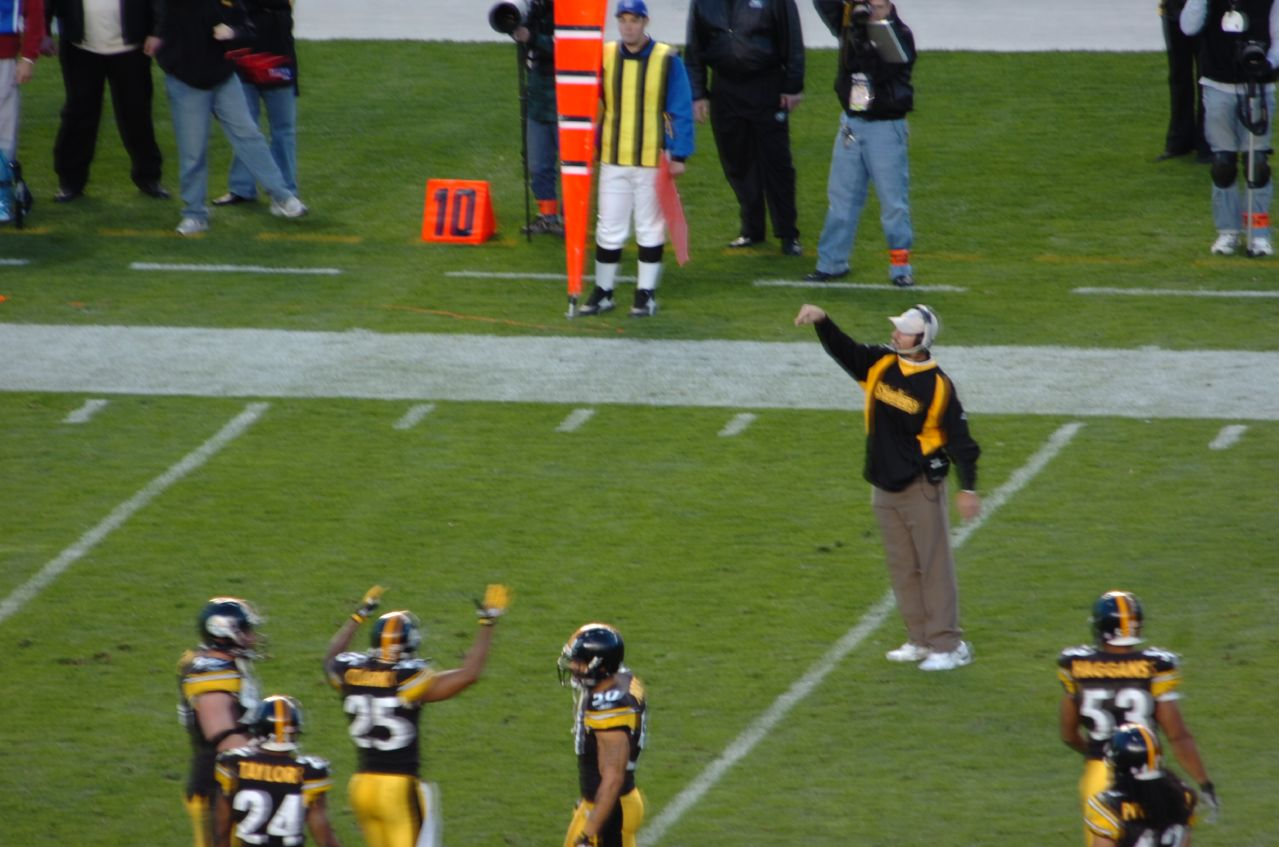
Bill Cowher challenges a call on the field

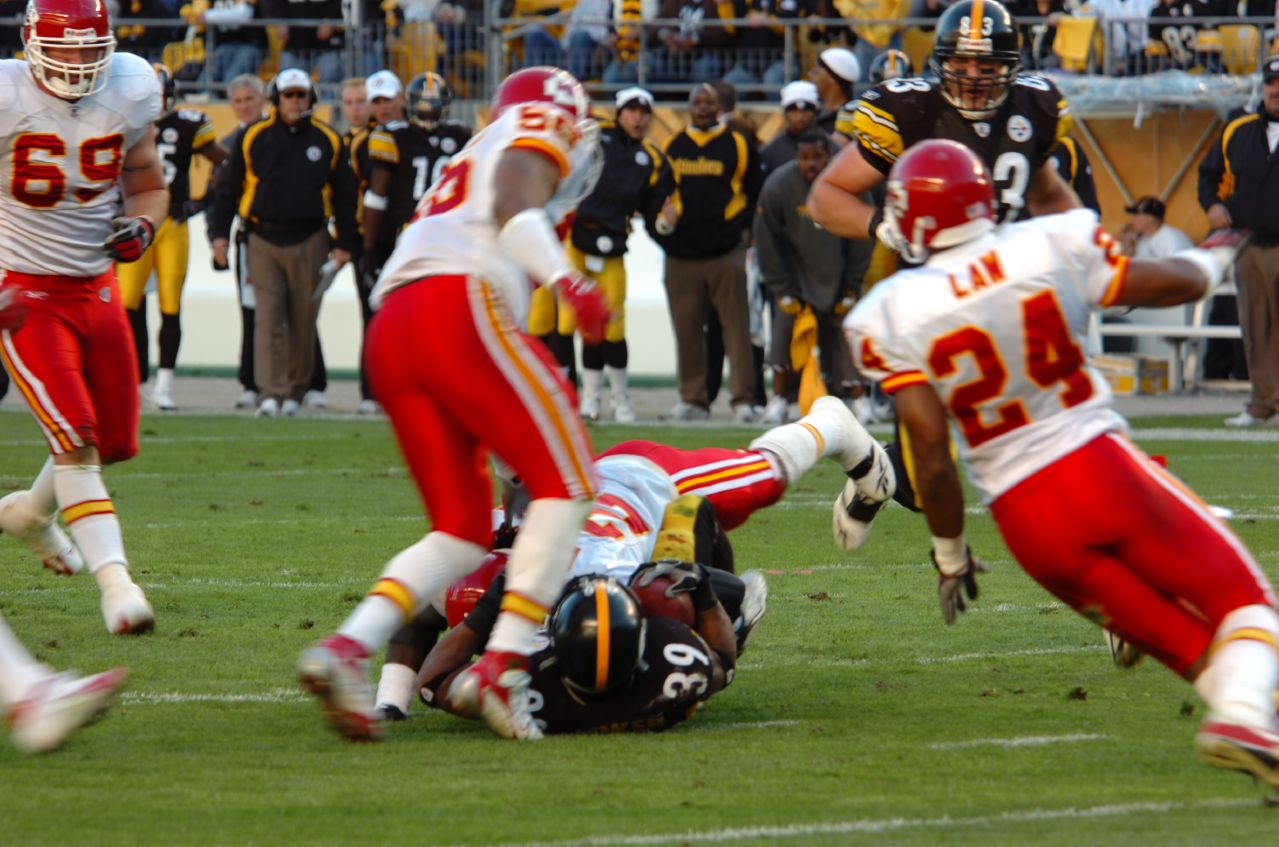
Willie Parker is tackled by the Chiefs

==== Week 7 (Sunday October 22, 2006): at Atlanta Falcons ====
Quarter	1	2	3	4	OT	Total
Steelers	10	14	7	7	0	**38**
**Falcons**	7	14	14	3	3	**41**

at Georgia Dome, Atlanta, Georgia

- Game time: 1:00 p.m. EDT
- Game weather: Dome
- Game attendance: 71,151
- Referee: Ron Winter
- TV announcers (CBS): Jim Nantz (play by play), Phil Simms (color commentator)

Hoping to build on their dominating win over the Chiefs, the Steelers flew to the Georgia Dome to face the Atlanta Falcons. In the first quarter, a Santonio Holmes fumble on a punt return helped set up quarterback Michael Vick's 22-yard touchdown pass to tight end Alge Crumpler. Afterwards, the Steelers took the lead with a 28-yard field goal by Jeff Reed and QB Ben Roethlisberger completing an 11-yard touchdown pass to wide receiver Hines Ward. In the second quarter, Roethlisberger completed a one-yard touchdown pass to Heath Miller. A fumble by Pittsburgh quarterback Ben Roethlisberger led to a second Vick touchdown pass to Crumpler. Then, a surprise onside kick recovered by the Falcons lead to Vick completing a 17-yard TD pass to receiver Michael Jenkins. The Steelers responded with Roethlisberger completing a 10-yard touchdown pass to receiver Nate Washington. In the third quarter, things became grim for Pittsburgh. First, Roethlisberger was injured on a pass to Miller, which caused him to leave the game with a concussion. Second, Atlanta retook the lead with running back Warrick Dunn completing a one-yard touchdown run, which was started from a fumble by Willie Parker. The Steelers responded as quarterback Charlie Batch completed a 70-yard touchdown pass to Ward. However, the Falcons retook the lead with Vick and Crumpler hooking up with each other for a third touchdown pass, this time for 31 yards. In the fourth quarter, Atlanta kicker Morten Andersen nailed a 25-yard field goal to give the Falcons a 7-point lead. Pittsburgh responded with a 17-yard touchdown pass to Ward, his third touchdown. Near the end of regulation, things got complicated for Atlanta on a field goal attempt. Kicker Michael Koenen nailed a 56-yard field goal, but it got negated due to a late Steelers time-out. Koenan rekicked it. It was no good, yet safety Troy Polamalu was called for running into the kicker. The Falcons brought in kicker Andersen to make a 52-yard field goal, yet it came up short. On the following drive, the Steelers could not score after a controversial false start call with the Steelers in field goal range prompted a 10-second runoff, which ended regulation. In overtime the Falcons won the coin toss. Falcons kicker Morten Andersen, after an 11 play 65 yard drive, won the game with a 32-yard field goal and gave the Steelers their fourth loss of the season while they fell to 2–4 (0-1 against the NFC South and 0-2 on the road). As of 2026, this remains the Steelers last loss to Atlanta. Stats

==== Week 8 (Sunday October 29, 2006): at Oakland Raiders ====
Quarter	1	2	3	4	Total
Steelers	0	6	0	7	**13**
**Raiders**	7	3	3	7	**20**

at McAfee Coliseum, Oakland, California

- Game time: 4:15 p.m. EST
- Game weather: 70 °F (21 °C) (Sunny)
- Game attendance: 62,385
- Referee: Tony Corrente
- TV announcers (CBS): Kevin Harlan (play by play), Rich Gannon (color commentator)

Hoping to rebound from their loss to the Falcons, the Steelers flew to McAfee Coliseum to take on the Oakland Raiders. In the first quarter, Pittsburgh trailed early as Raiders cornerback Nnamdi Asomugha returned an interception 24 yards for a touchdown for the only score of the quarter. In the second quarter, Pittsburgh came within one point when kicker Jeff Reed kicked two field goals, a 29-yarder and a 39-yarder. Oakland responded with kicker Sebastian Janikowski kicking a 19-yard field goal. In the third quarter, Janikowski increased the Raiders lead with a 41-yard field goal for the only score of the quarter. In the fourth quarter Raiders defensive-back Chris Carr returned an interception 100 yards for a touchdown. Pittsburgh tried to rally with quarterback Ben Roethlisberger completing a 25-yard touchdown pass to running back Willie Parker. The Raiders were able to hold off the Steelers in the closing seconds of the game, earning a victory as the Steelers fell to 2–5. Stats

Despite the Steelers out-gaining the Raiders 360–98 in total offense, Roethlisberger threw four interceptions (two of which were returned for touchdowns), which led to Oakland's first back-to-back victory of the year.

==== Week 9 (Sunday November 5, 2006): vs. Denver Broncos ====
Quarter	1	2	3	4	Total
**Broncos**	14	0	7	10	**31**
Steelers	0	10	7	3	**20**

at Heinz Field, Pittsburgh, Pennsylvania

- Game time: 4:15 p.m. EST
- Game weather: 51 °F (11 °C) (Partly Sunny)
- Game attendance: 64,661
- Referee: Walt Anderson
- TV announcers (CBS): Jim Nantz (play by play), Phil Simms (color commentator)

Hoping to rebound from their two-game losing streak, the Steelers came back home to host the 5–2 Denver Broncos. Despite Ben Roethlisberger throwing for 433 yards and one touchdown, the Steelers had six turnovers with three interceptions and three fumbles in a 31–20 loss to the Broncos. The Steelers were trailing by four points at halftime, but in the third quarter, wide receiver Javon Walker scored on a 72-yard reverse to put the Broncos up 21–10. It looked like the Steelers had a comeback when receiver Hines Ward caught a pass and jumped towards the end zone, but the ball popped out and the Broncos recovered and were able to run out the clock. With a third-straight loss, the Steelers fell to 2–6. There was a suspected terror event that day. Stats

==== Week 10 (Sunday November 12, 2006): vs. New Orleans Saints ====
Quarter	1	2	3	4	Total
Saints	7	17	0	7	**31**
**Steelers**	14	3	7	14	**38**

at Heinz Field, Pittsburgh, Pennsylvania

- Game time: 4:15 p.m. EST
- Game weather: 39 °F (4 °C) (Cloudy)
- Game attendance: 61,911
- Referee: Bill Carollo
- TV announcers (Fox): Joe Buck (play by play), Troy Aikman (color commentator), Pam Oliver (sideline reporter)

The Pittsburgh Steelers hosted the New Orleans Saints on Sunday in a shoot out. Pittsburgh jumped to a 14–0 lead in the first quarter after Hines Ward caught a touchdown pass and when the Steelers capitalized on a Saints turnover with another touchdown pass to Heath Miller. The Saints came marching back and took the lead with Reggie Bush's rush TD on the double reverse and pulled further ahead with a Deuce McAllister 4-yd TD run near the end of the half. A Reggie Bush fumble, a missed field goal, and Willie Parker's two 70+ yard runs set up two scores, which allowed the Steelers to come back and take the lead to win. The Steelers went to 3–6 with the win while the Saints fell to 6–3. Stats

==== Week 11 (Sunday November 19, 2006): at Cleveland Browns ====
Quarter	1	2	3	4	Total
**Steelers**	0	0	3	21	**24**
Browns	0	10	0	10	**20**

at Cleveland Browns Stadium, Cleveland, Ohio

- Game time: 1:00 p.m. EST
- Game weather: 38 °F (3 °C) (Cloudy)
- Game attendance: 73,296
- Referee: Gerry Austin
- TV announcers (CBS): Gus Johnson (play by play), Steve Tasker (color commentator)

Hoping to build off their victory over the Saints, the Steelers flew to Cleveland Browns Stadium for Round 1 of the Rust Belt series with the Cleveland Browns. After a scoreless first quarter, the Steelers trailed as DB Daven Holly returned an interception 57 yards for a touchdown. Afterwards, kicker Phil Dawson nailed a 23-yard field goal. In the third quarter, Pittsburgh finally scored as kicker Jeff Reed completed a 43-yard field goal for the only score of the quarter. In the fourth quarter, Dawson made a 35-yard field goal for the Browns, while the Steelers responded with QB Ben Roethlisberger completed a 20-yard TD pass to rookie WR Santonio Holmes. However, things looked grim as Browns WR Joshua Cribbs returned a kickoff 92 yards for a touchdown. RB Willie Parker answered with a 1-yard TD run and a 4-yard touchdown reception. Afterwards, the Pittsburgh managed to hold off a late drive by Cleveland. With the win, not only did the Steelers get back-to-back wins for the first time this year, but they also got their first road win of the year. With the victory, Pittsburgh advanced to 4–6. Stats

==== Week 12 (Sunday November 26, 2006): at Baltimore Ravens ====
Quarter	1	2	3	4	Total
Steelers	0	0	0	0	**0**
**Ravens**	7	10	7	3	**27**

at M&T Bank Stadium, Baltimore, Maryland

- Game time: 1:00 p.m. EST
- Game weather: 53 °F (12 °C) (Cloudy)
- Game attendance: 70,946
- Referee: Gene Steratore
- TV announcers (CBS): Greg Gumbel (play by play), Dan Dierdorf (color commentator)

Coming off a two-game winning streak, the Steelers flew to M&T Bank Stadium for their AFC North fight with the Baltimore Ravens. However, the problems that had plagued Pittsburgh all season continued to haunt them. In the first quarter, QB Steve McNair completed a 20-yard TD pass to TE Todd Heap for the only score of the quarter. In the second quarter, RB Jamal Lewis got a 1-yard TD run, while kicker Matt Stover nailed a 37-yard field goal. In the third quarter, things worsened as QB Ben Roethlisberger was hit and fumbled the ball, which was recovered by Ravens OLB Adalius Thomas. Thomas returned it 57 yards for a touchdown and the only score of the quarter. In the fourth quarter, Stover put the game away with a 40-yard field goal. Stats

Not only did Baltimore's offense help contribute to the Steelers dropping to 4–7, the Ravens defense (anchored by the return of veteran LB Ray Lewis) was also a huge factor, as they sacked Roethlisberger nine times and forced two interceptions.

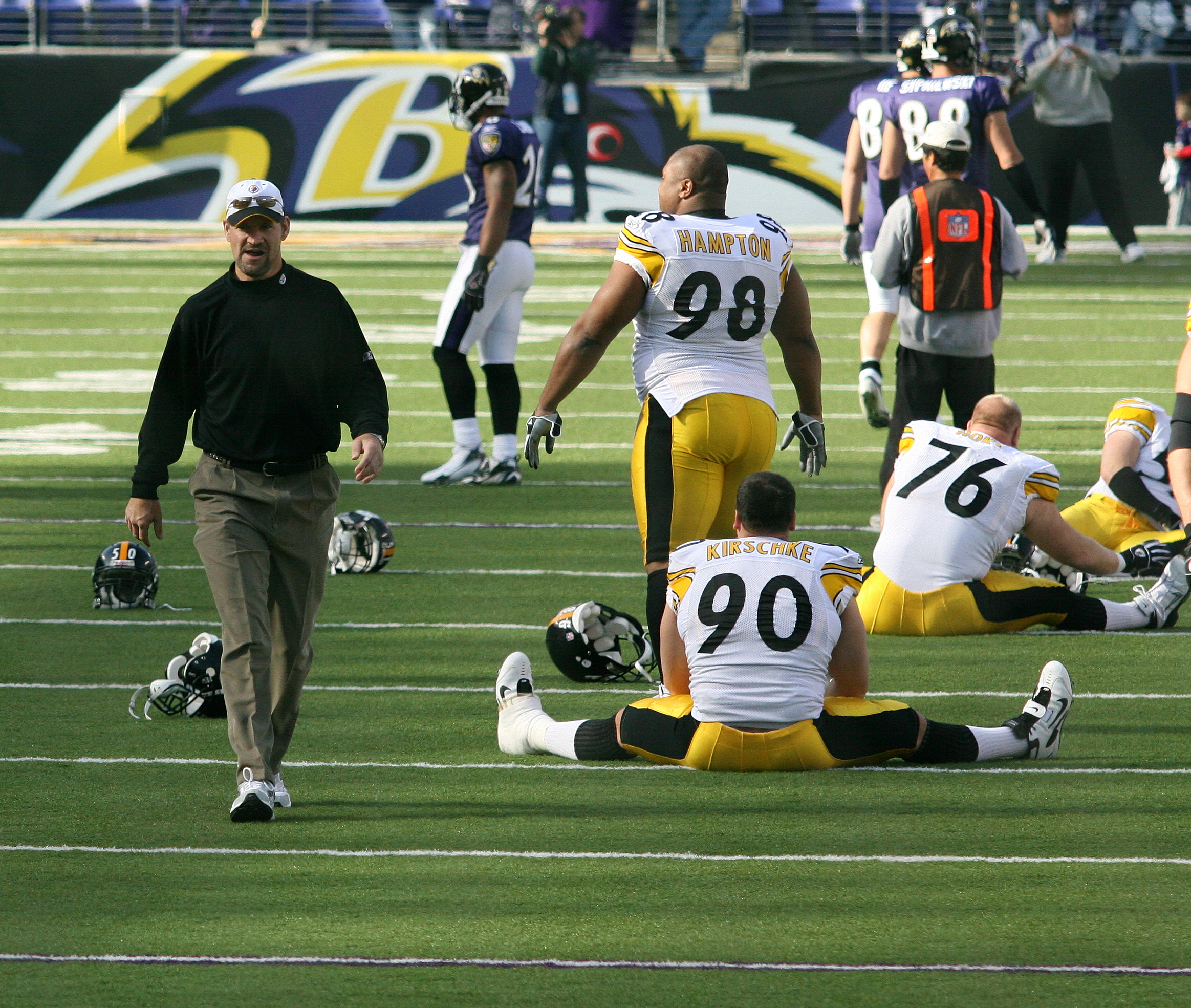
Casey Hampton and Bill Cowher during the warmup

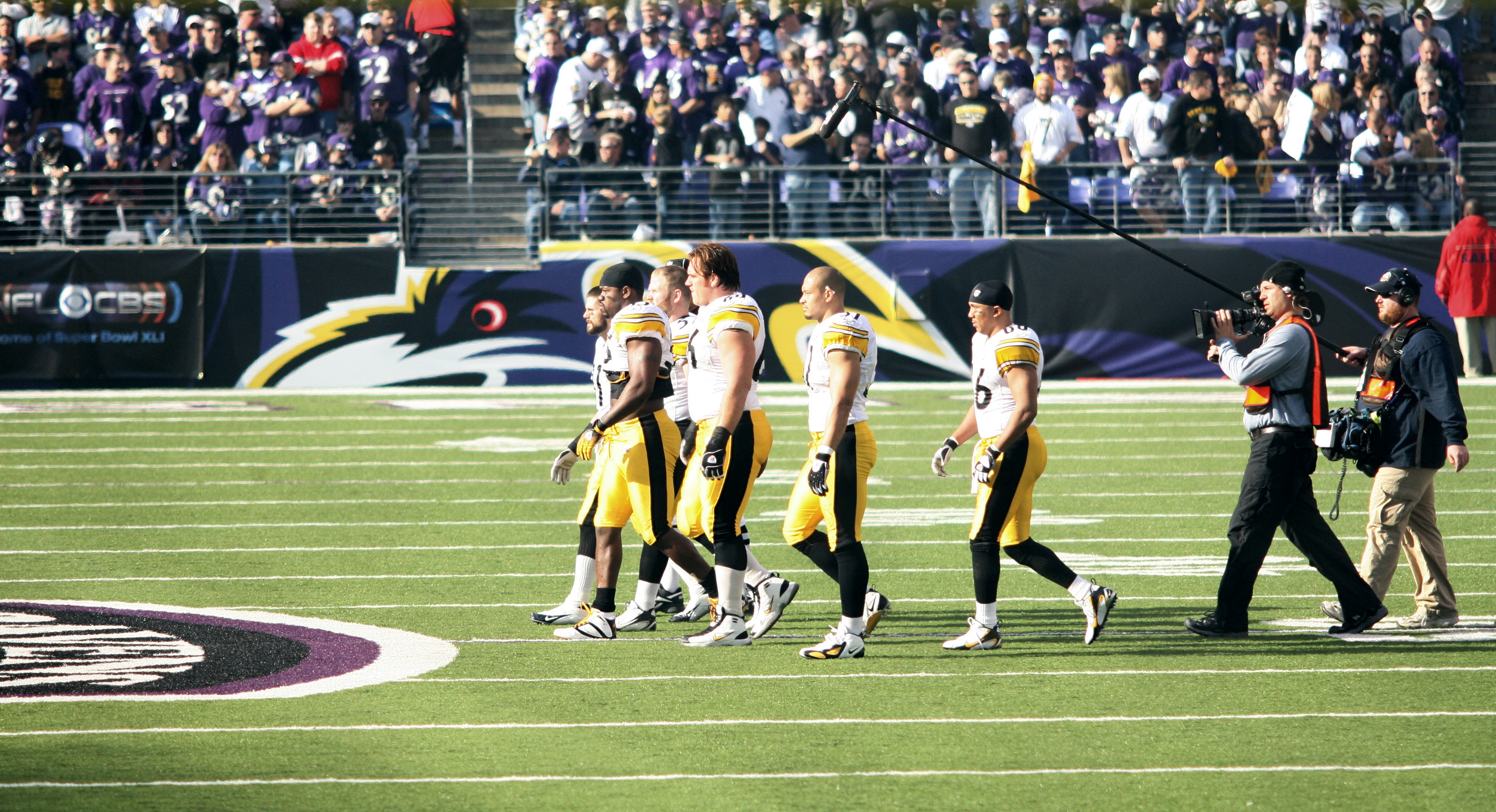
Pittsburgh captains approach midfield for the coin toss

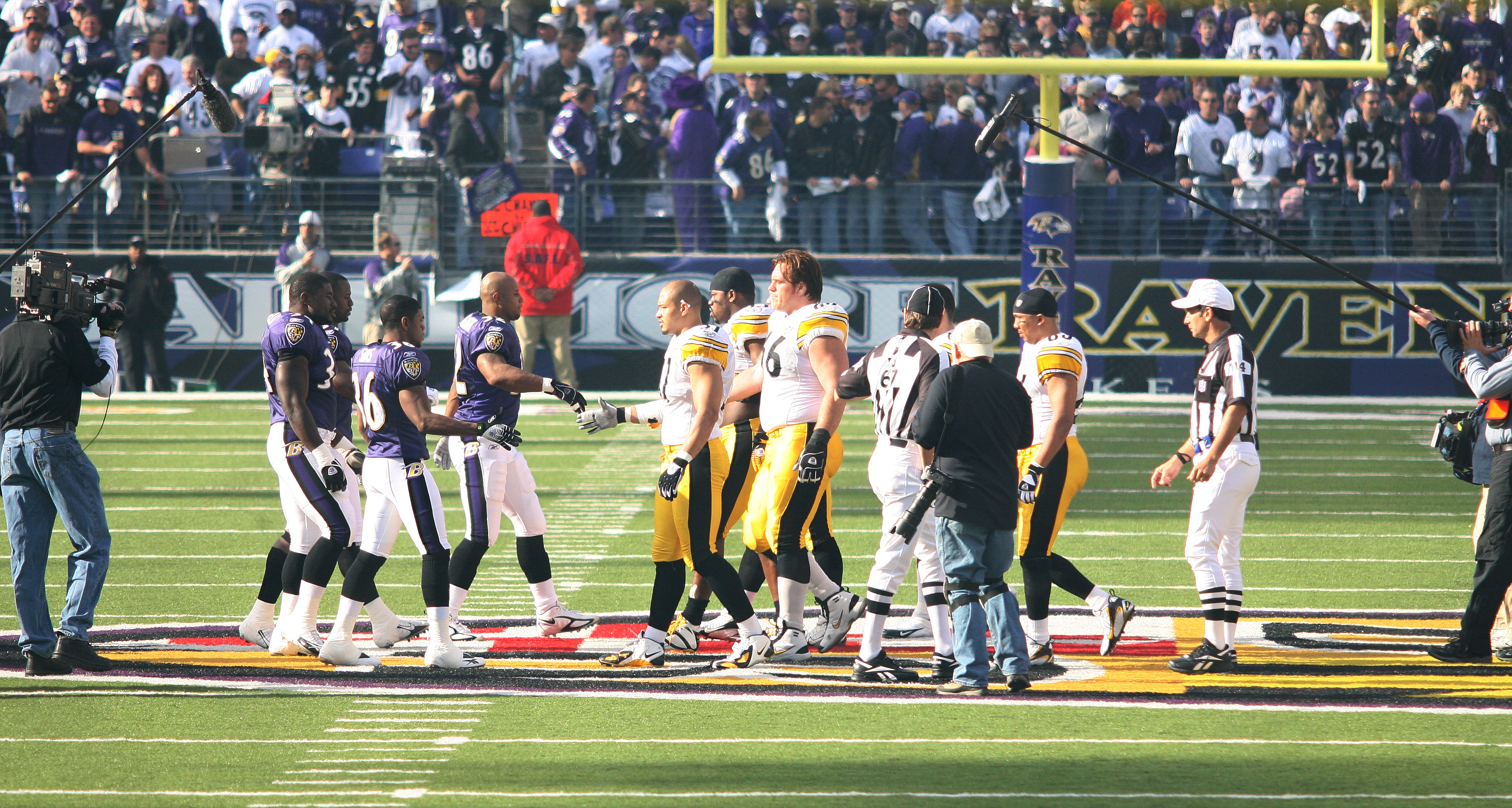
Steelers and Ravens players before the coin toss

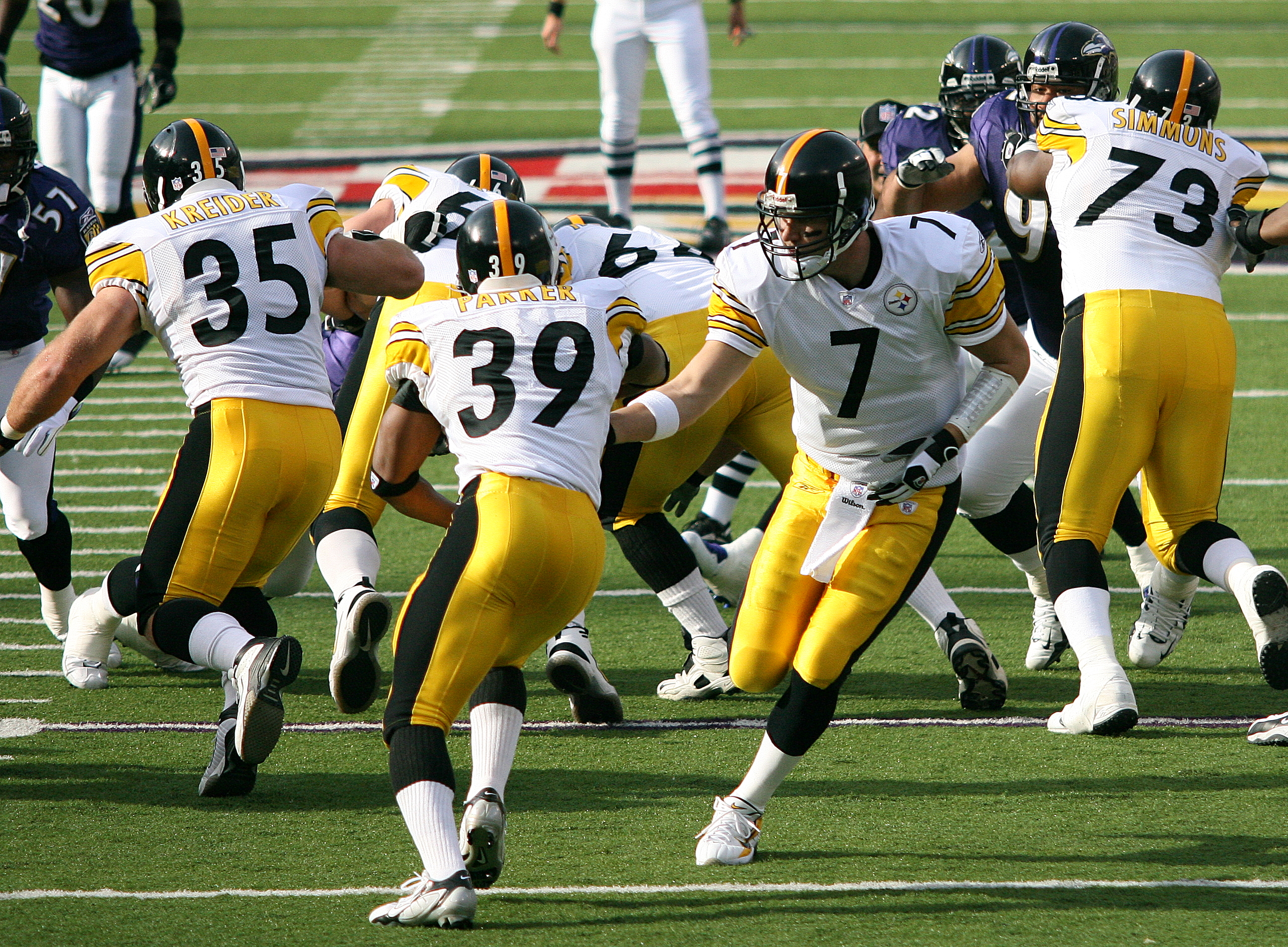
Ben Roethlisberger hands off to Willie Parker

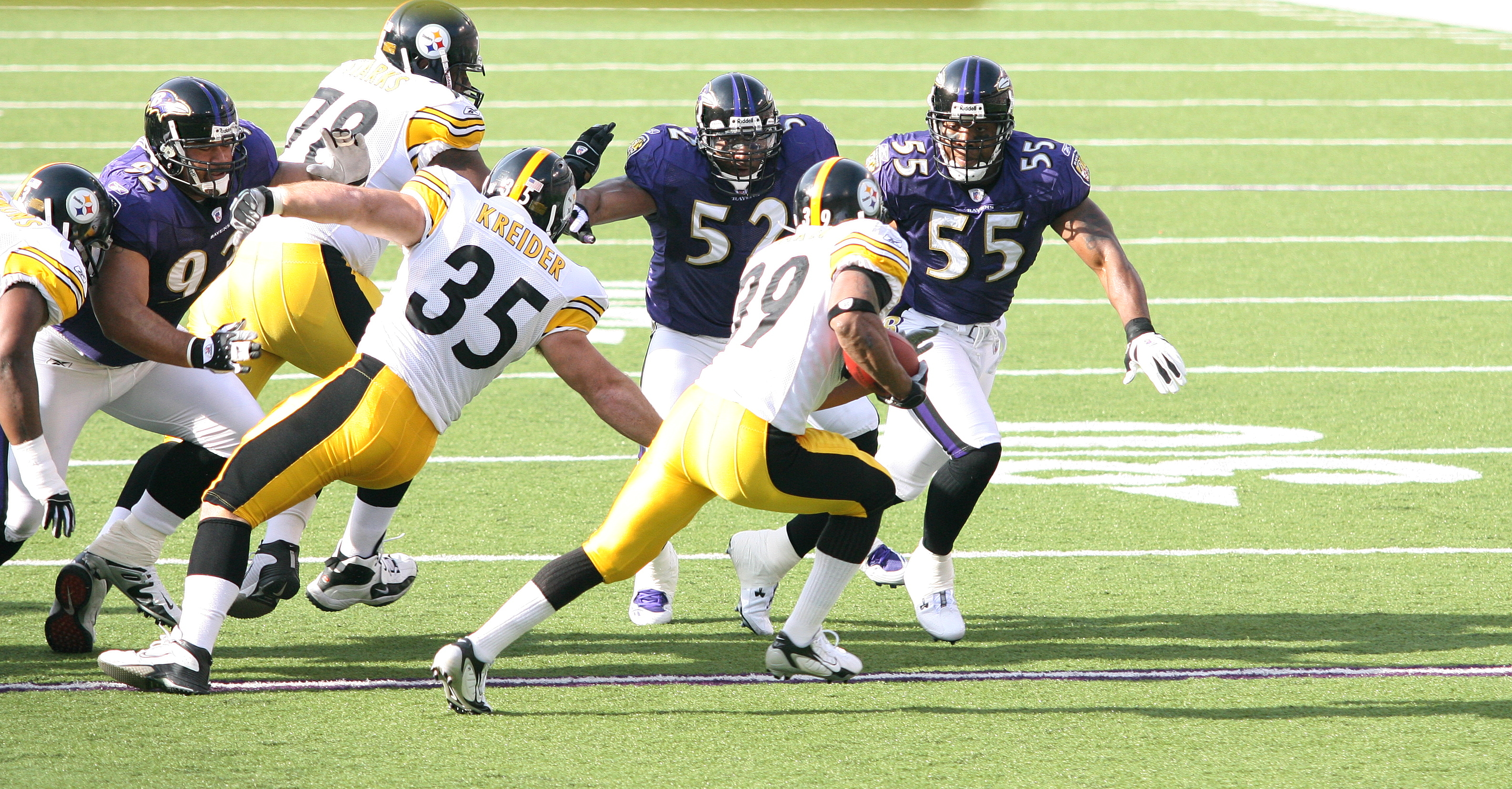
The Ravens face Willie Parker

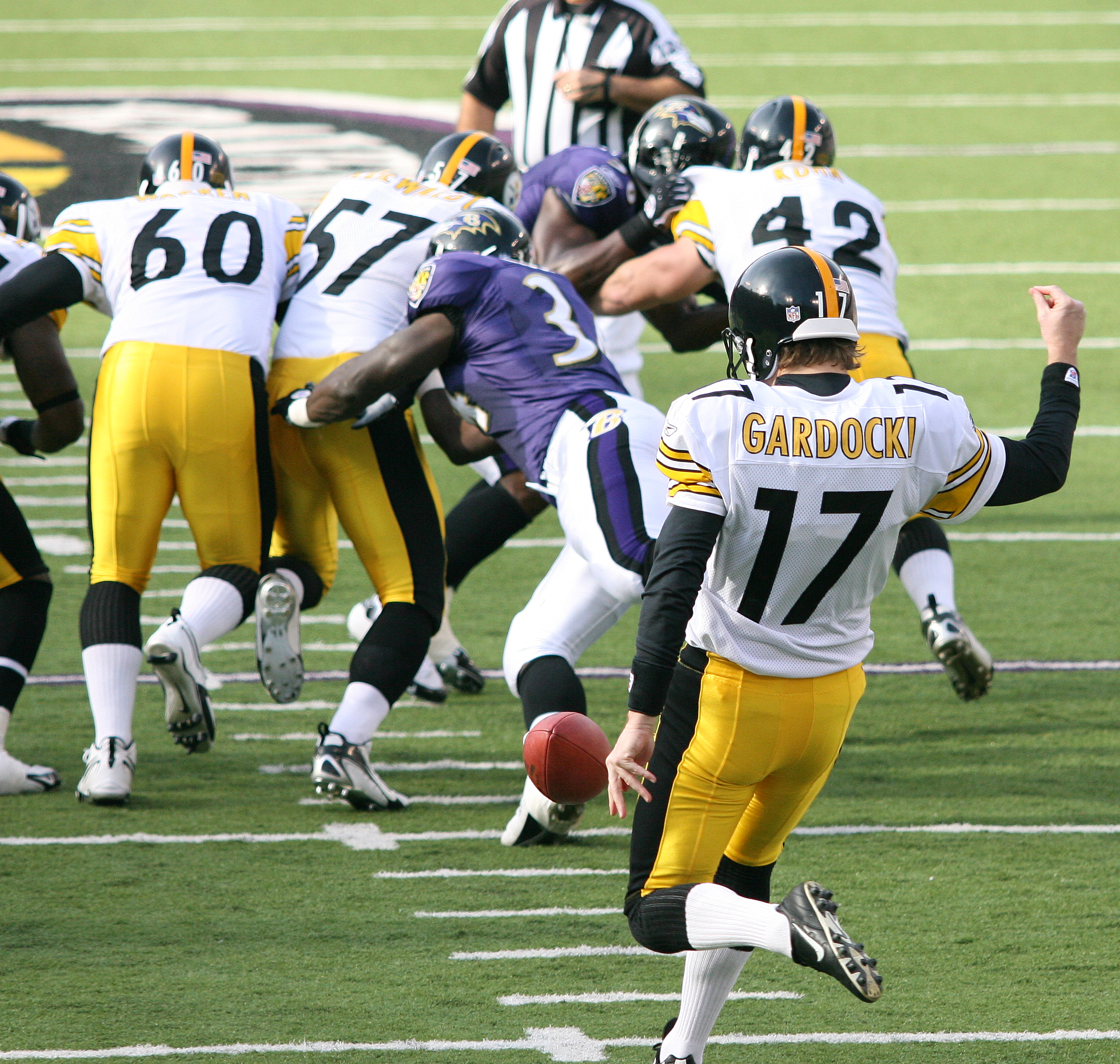
Chris Gardocki punts for Pittsburgh

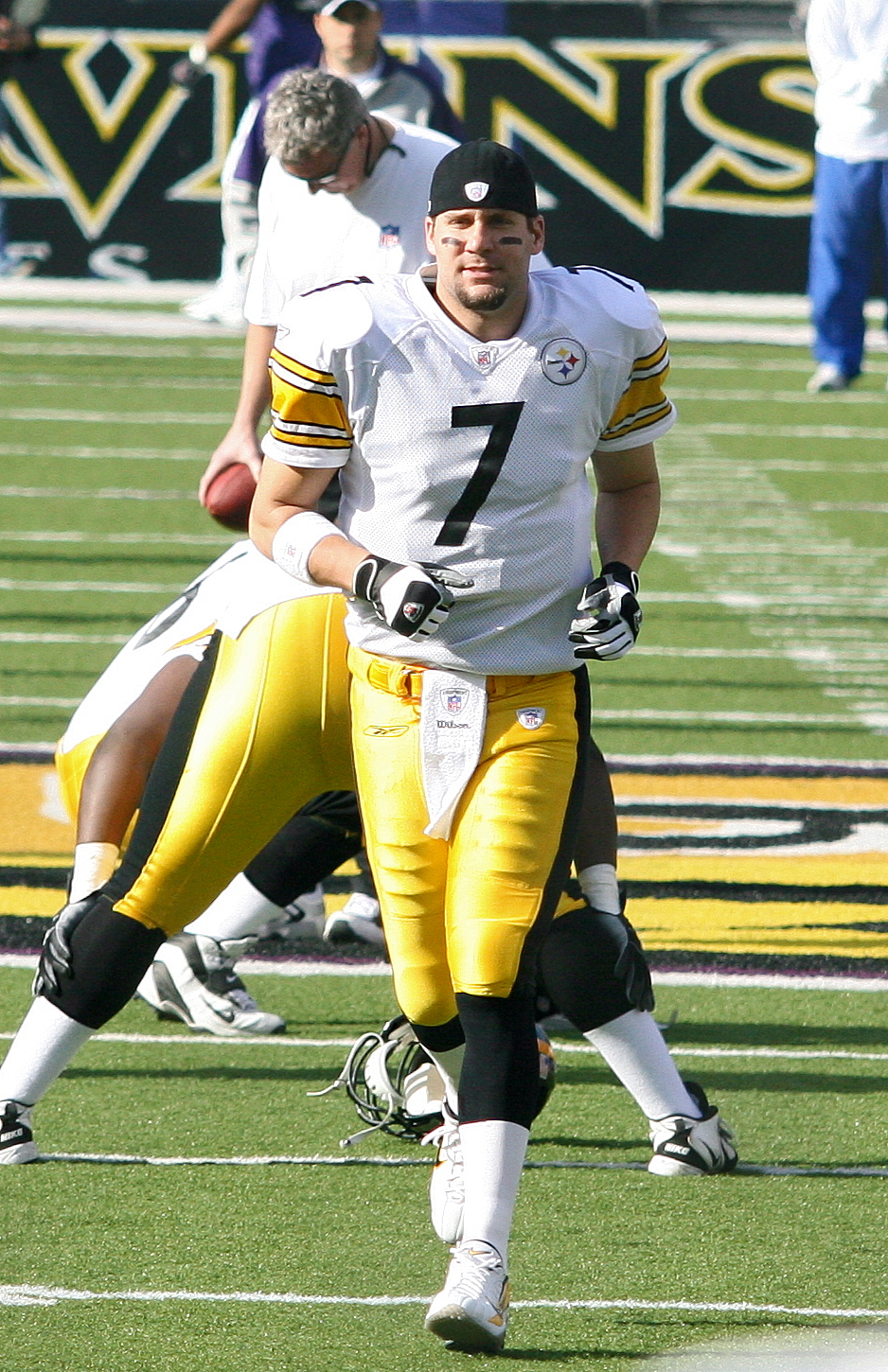
Roethlisberger warming up for the week 12 game

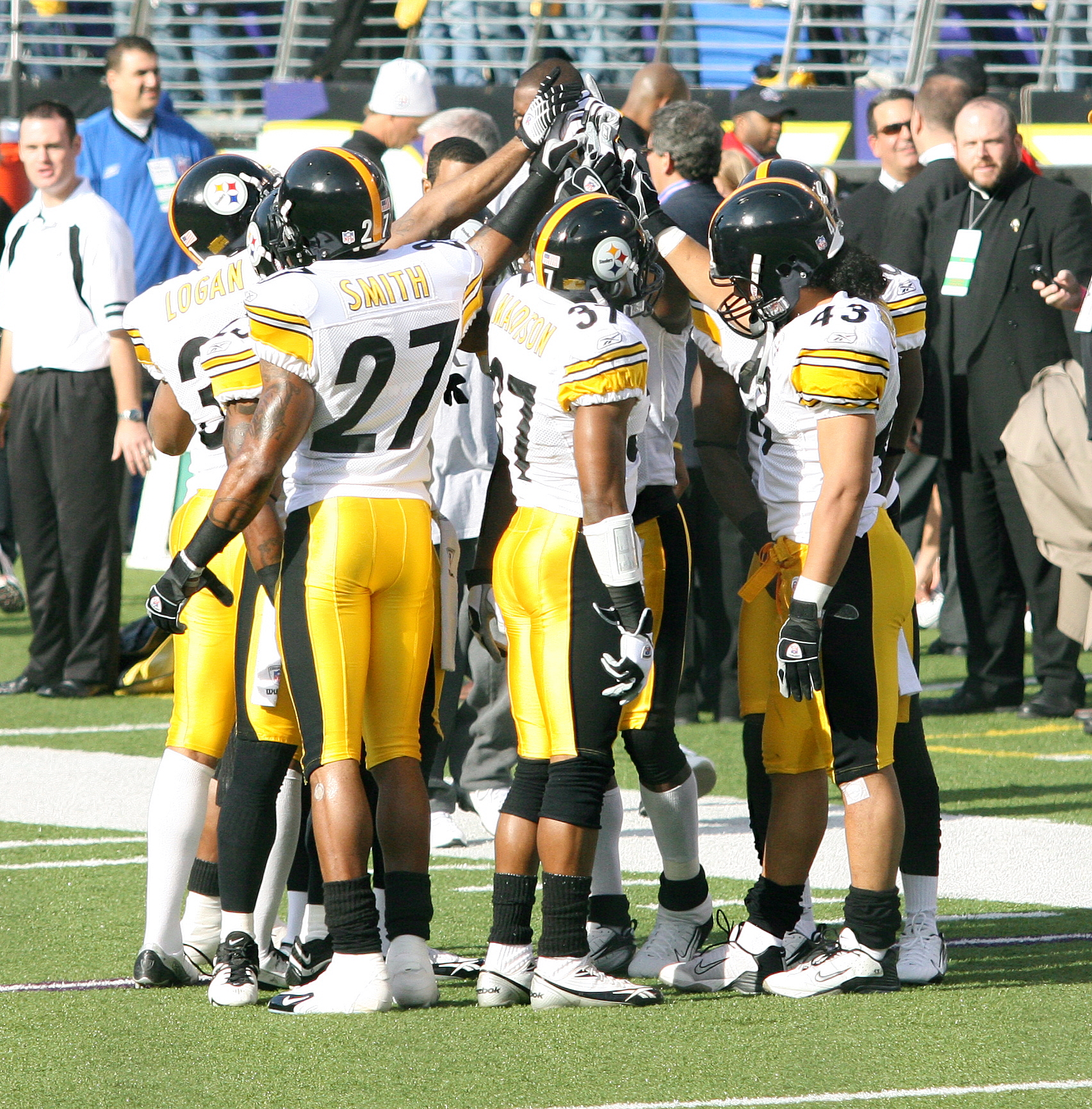
Steelers pregame huddle

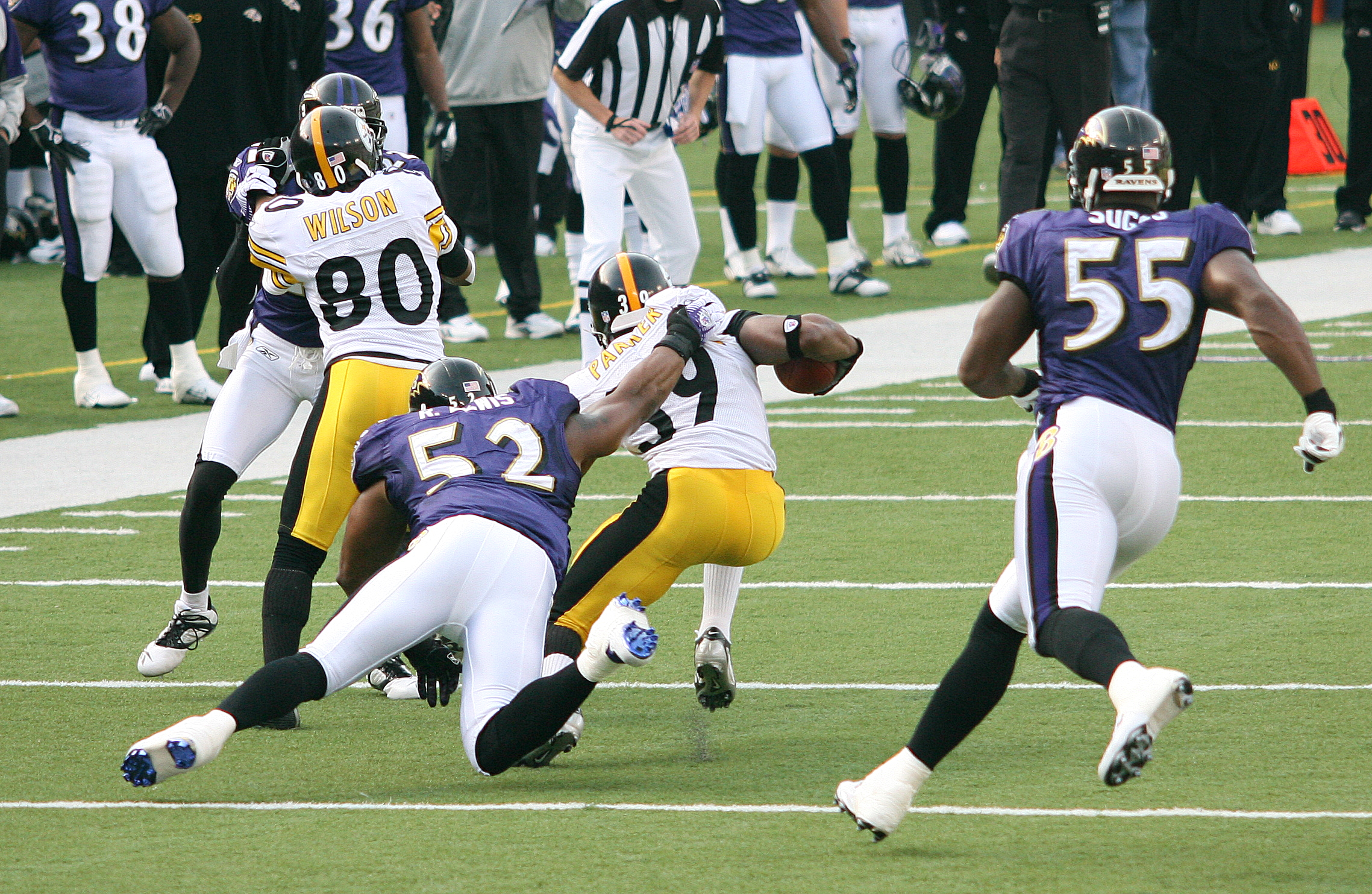
Ray Lewis tackles Willie Parker

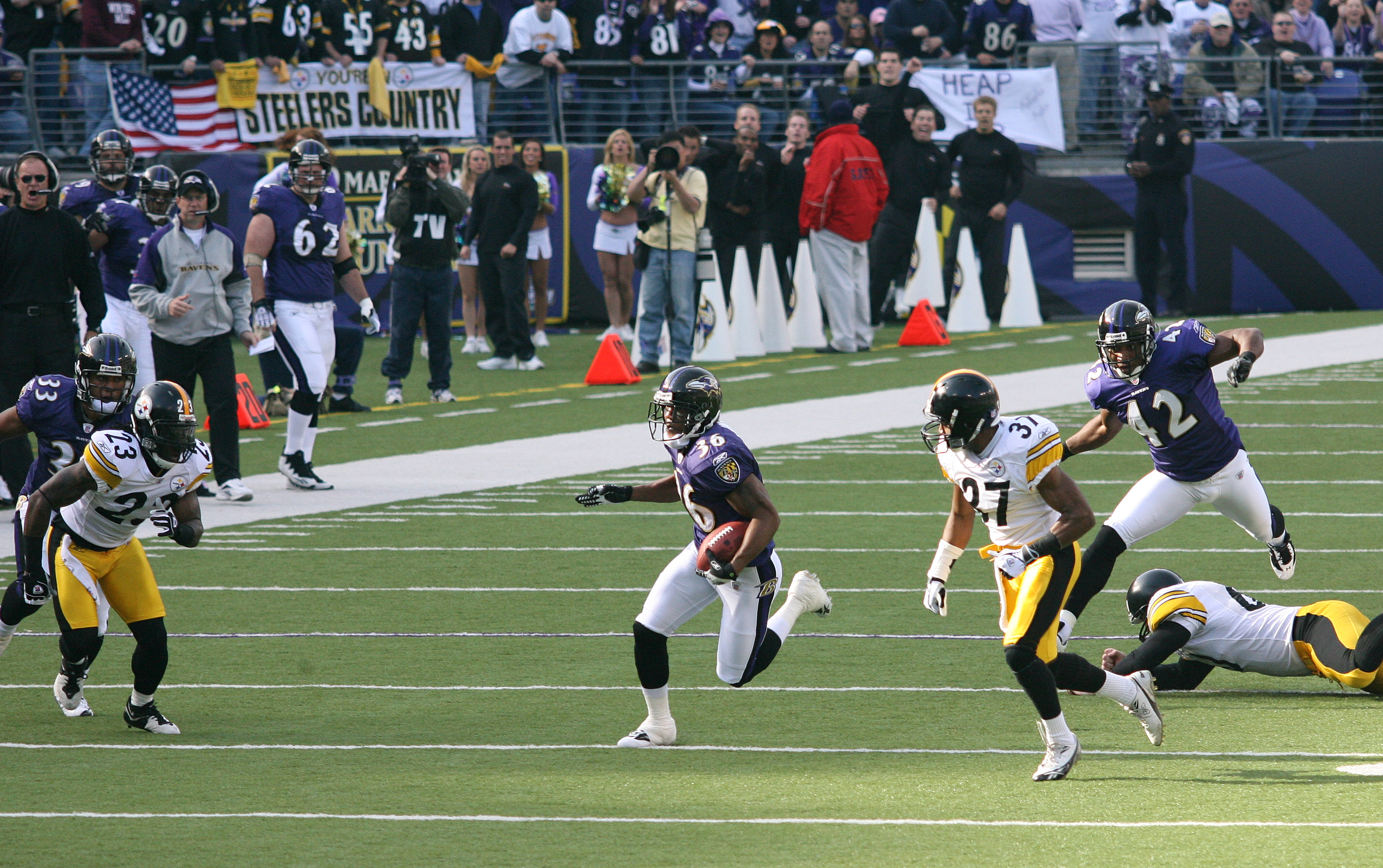
Baltimore on offense

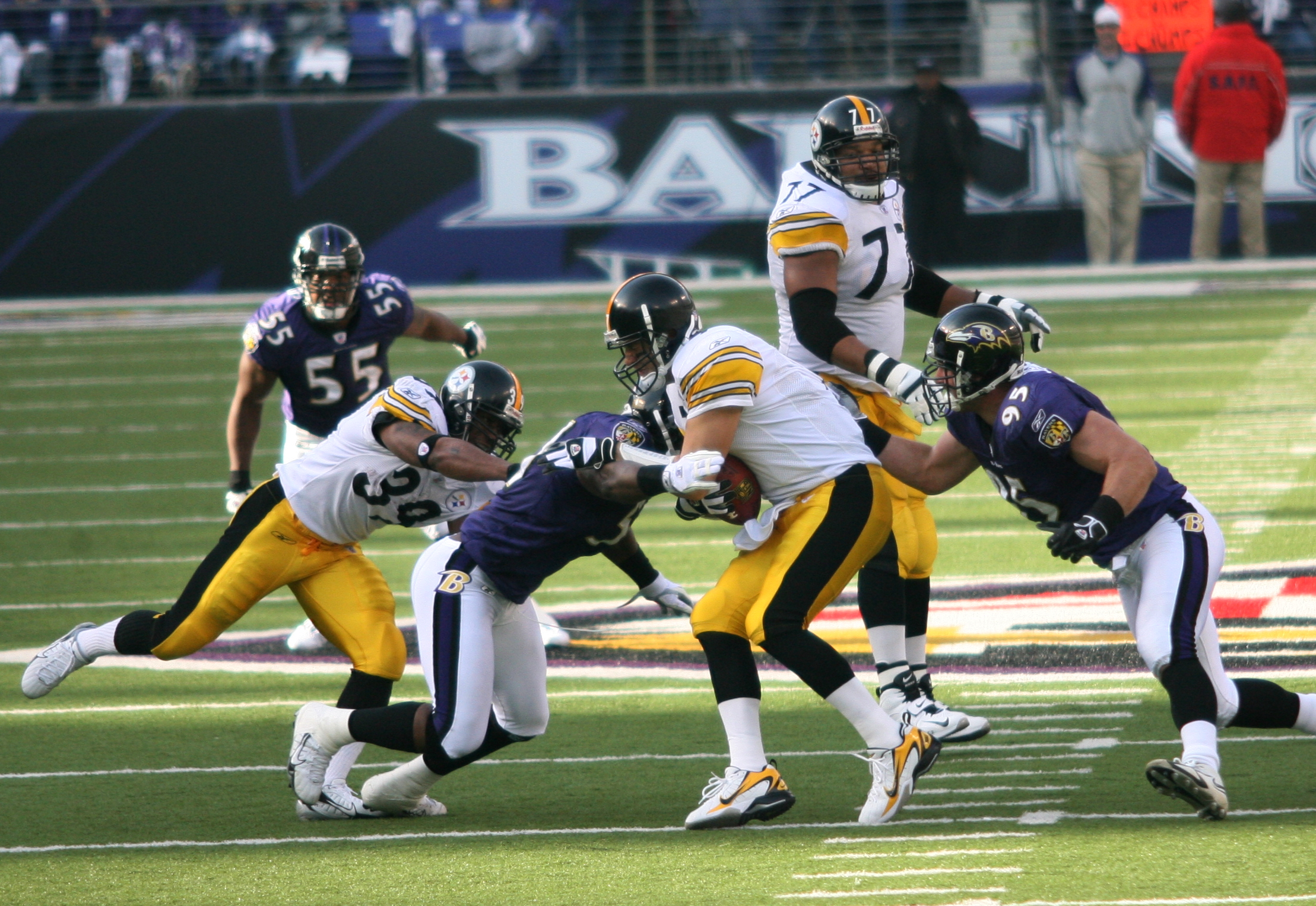
Baltimore sacks Ben Roethlisberger

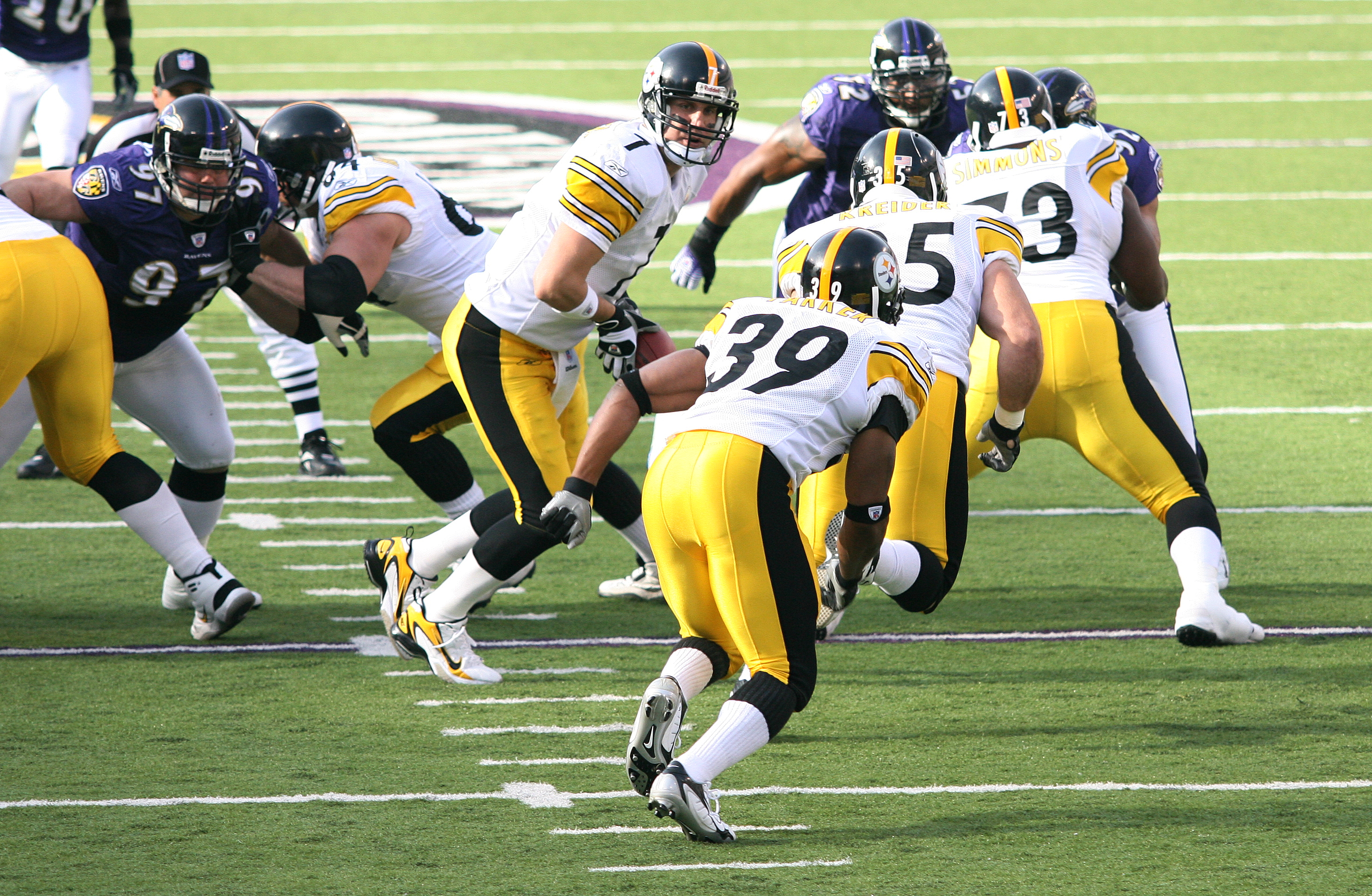
Handoff to Parker

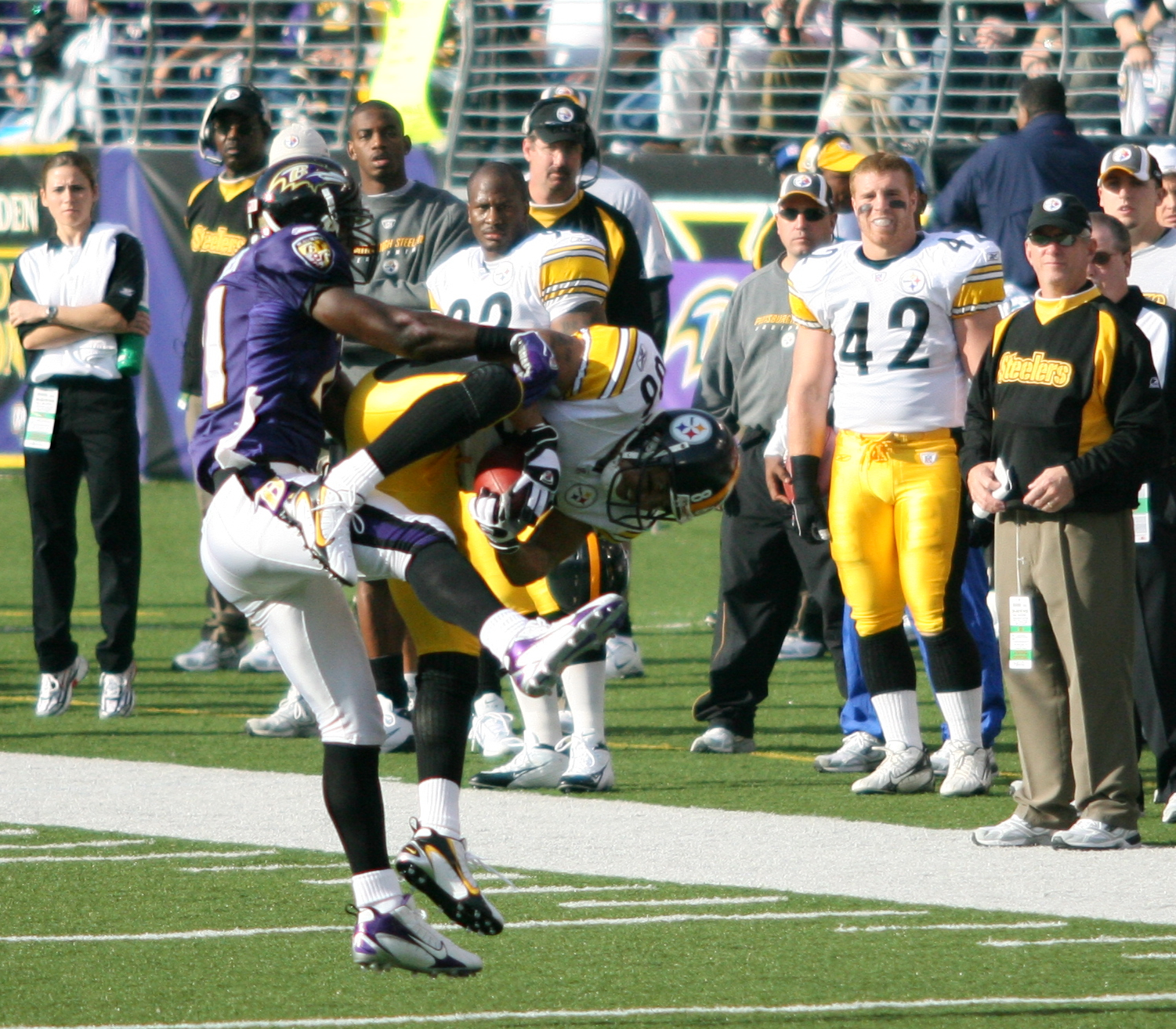
Hines Ward catches

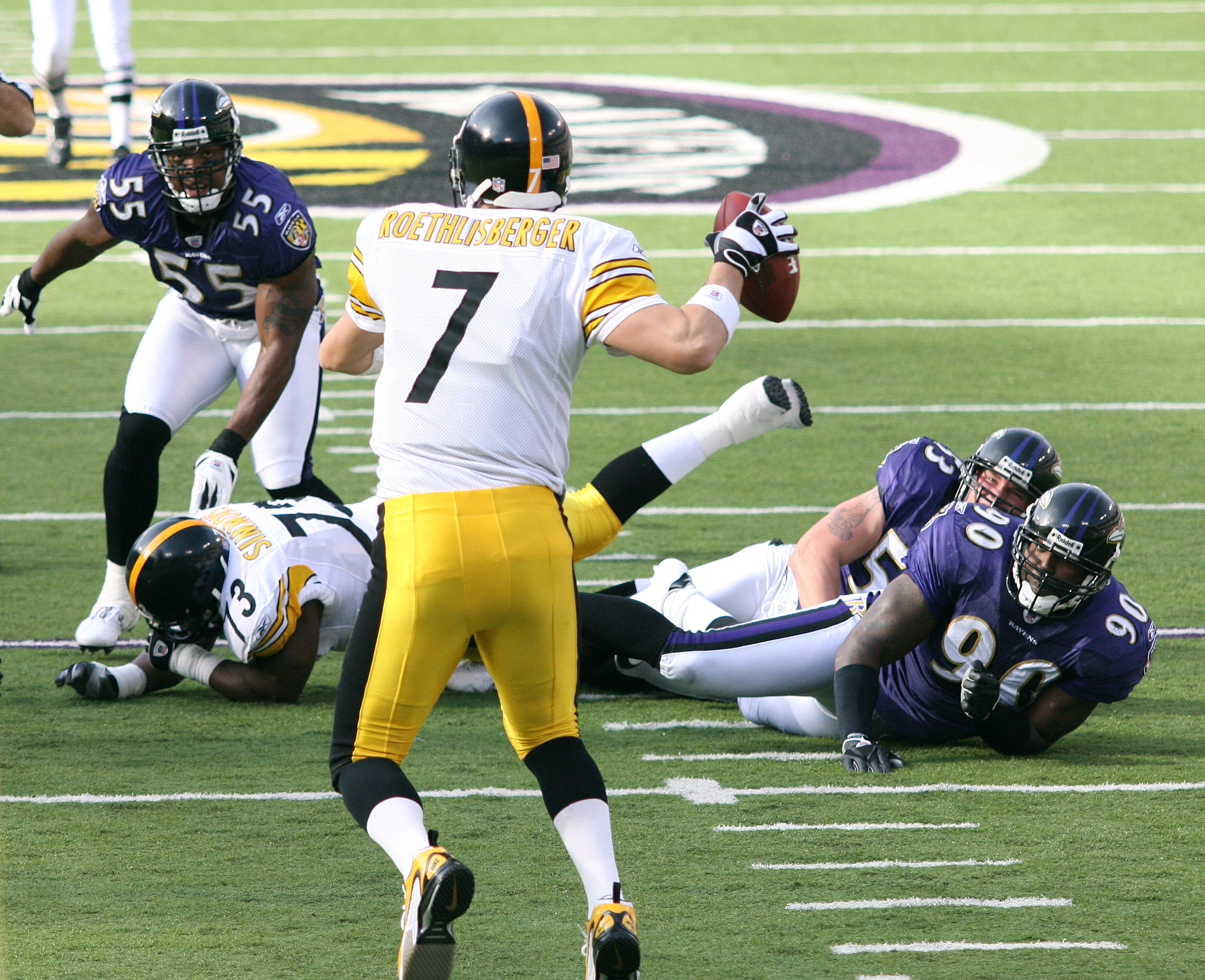
Roethlisberger prepares to throw

==== Week 13 (Sunday, December 3, 2006): vs. Tampa Bay Buccaneers ====
Quarter	1	2	3	4	Total
Buccaneers	0	0	0	3	**3**
**Steelers**	7	3	0	10	**20**

at Heinz Field, Pittsburgh, Pennsylvania

- Game time: 4:15 p.m. EST
- Game weather: 40 °F (4 °C) (cloudy)
- Game attendance: 59,843
- Referee: Terry McAulay
- TV announcers (Fox): Ron Pitts (play by play), Jesse Palmer (color commentator)

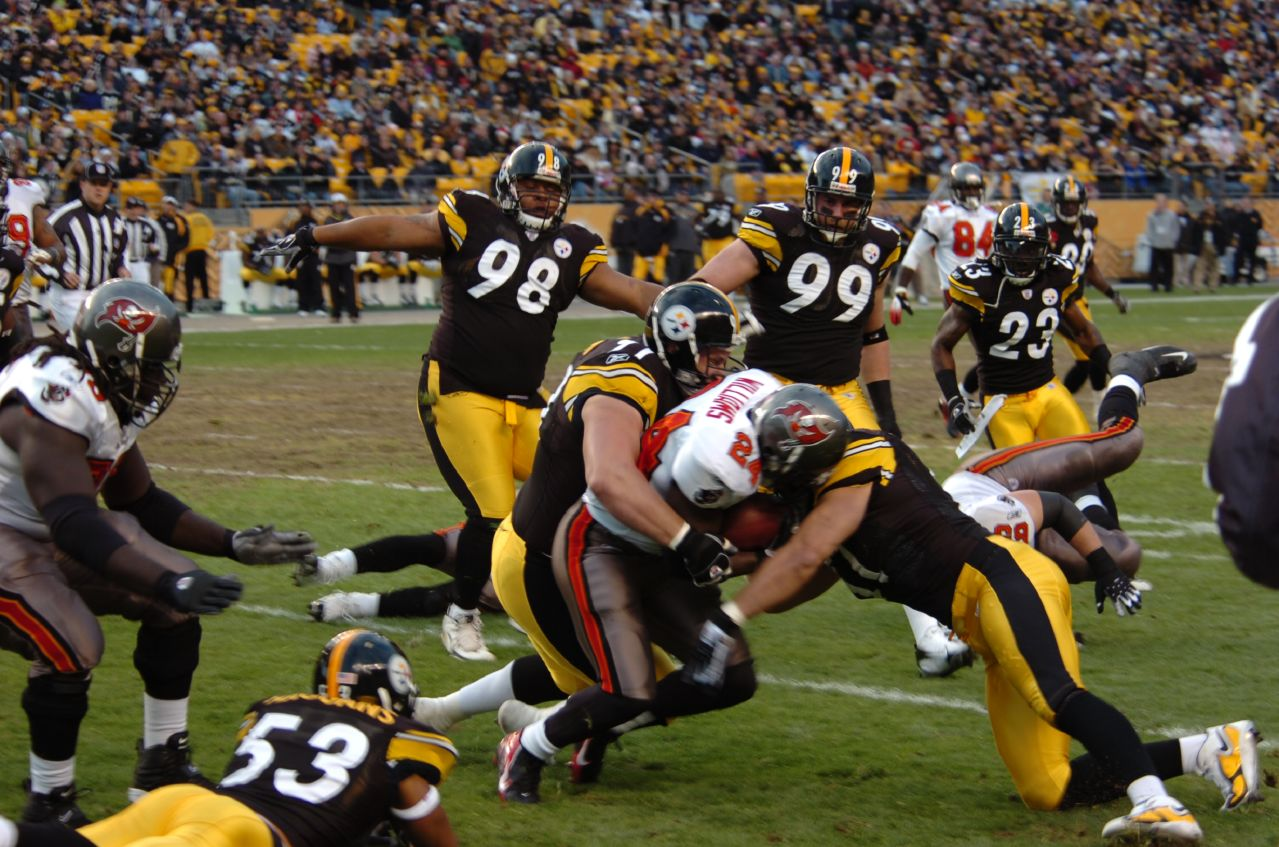
Pittsburgh's defense held the Bucs to three points.

Following a road loss to the Ravens, the Steelers went home for a Week 13 fight with the Tampa Bay Buccaneers, who were visiting Pittsburgh for the first time since 1983. In the first quarter, the Steelers scored first with QB Ben Roethlisberger's 2-yard TD pass to TE Jerame Tuman for the only score of the quarter. In the second quarter, Pittsburgh increased its lead with kicker Jeff Reed's 50-yard field goal for the only score of the quarter. After a scoreless third quarter, the Steelers continued their dominance in the fourth quarter. Roethlisberger completed a 16-yard TD pass to TE Heath Miller, while Reed nailed a 39-yard field goal. The only response from the Bucs was on the final play of the game, when kicker Matt Bryant spoiled Pittsburgh's chance for a shutout with a 27-yard field goal. The win improved the Steelers' record to 5–7.

==== Week 14 (Thursday December 7, 2006): vs. Cleveland Browns ====
Quarter	1	2	3	4	Total
Browns	0	0	0	7	**7**
**Steelers**	7	3	14	3	**27**

at Heinz Field, Pittsburgh, Pennsylvania

- Game time: 8:30 p.m. EST
- Game weather: 18 °F (−8 °C) (Snow)
- Game attendance: 55,246
- Referee: Bill Vinovich
- TV announcers (NFL Network): Bryant Gumbel (play by play), Cris Collinsworth (color commentator)

After a rebounding win against the Bucs, the Steelers stayed at home for a Thursday night fight in Round 2 of the Rust Belt rivalry against the Cleveland Browns. In the first quarter, the Steelers started off strong with QB Ben Roethlisberger completing a 49-yard TD pass to WR Nate Washington for the only score of the quarter. In the second quarter, Pittsburgh continued its domination with kicker Jeff Reed nailing a 23-yard field goal for the only score of the quarter. In the third quarter, the Steelers had its breakout with Roethlisberger getting a touchdown on a 2-yard QB sneak, while RB Willie Parker got a 3-yard TD run. In the fourth quarter, Pittsburgh managed to wrap the game up with Reed kicking a 28-yard field goal. The Browns managed to get their only score of the game with QB Derek Anderson completing a 45-yard TD pass to WR Braylon Edwards. With yet another season-sweep over Cleveland, not only did the Steelers improve to 6–7, but "Fast Willie" managed to set a franchise record for the most rushing yards with 223 yards and he became the first Steeler RB to have a pair of 200-yard games in one season. The Steelers also tied their all-time series against the Browns, at 55–55. Stats

==== Week 15 (Sunday December 17, 2006): at Carolina Panthers ====
Quarter	1	2	3	4	Total
**Steelers**	0	17	10	10	**37**
Panthers	0	3	0	0	**3**

at Bank of America Stadium, Charlotte, North Carolina

- Game time: 1:00 p.m. EST
- Game weather: 68 °F (20 °C) (Sunny)
- Game attendance: 73,798
- Referee: Ron Winter
- TV announcers (CBS): Dick Enberg (play by play), Randy Cross (color commentator)

Following their season-sweep over the Browns, the Steelers flew to Bank of America Stadium for a Week 15 interconference fight with the Carolina Panthers. After a scoreless first quarter, Pittsburgh began their dominance in the second quarter. It started with QB Ben Roethlisberger's 1-yard TD run. Afterwards, kicker Jeff Reed nailed a 19-yard field goal, while Roethlisberger completed a 13-yard TD pass to RB Najeh Davenport. The Panthers got their only score of the game with kicker John Kasay's 37-yard field goal. In the third quarter, Reed improved the Steelers' lead with a 45-yard field goal, while RB Willie Parker got a 41-yard TD run. In the fourth quarter, rookie WR Santonio Holmes (who was plagued all year with fumbles on special teams) returned a punt 65 yards for a touchdown. Afterwards, Reed helped Pittsburgh wrap the game up with a 26-yard field goal. With the win, the Steelers improved to 7–7. Stats

==== Week 16 (Sunday December 24, 2006): vs. Baltimore Ravens ====
Quarter	1	2	3	4	Total
**Ravens**	7	7	7	10	**31**
Steelers	0	7	0	0	**7**

at Heinz Field, Pittsburgh, Pennsylvania

- Game time: 1:00 p.m. EST
- Game weather: 42 °F (6 °C) (Partly Sunny)
- Game attendance: 63,224
- Referee: Larry Nemmers
- TV announcers (CBS): Kevin Harlan (play by play), Rich Gannon (color commentator)

The Baltimore Ravens defeated the Steelers on December 24, 2006, therefore eliminating the Steelers from playoff contention, and ending their defense of their Super Bowl championship. The Steelers became the first Super Bowl champion since the Tampa Bay Buccaneers in 2003 to not reach the playoffs the following season. They fell to 7–8 and were swept by the Ravens for the first time.Stats

==== Week 17 (Sunday December 31, 2006): at Cincinnati Bengals ====
Quarter	1	2	3	4	OT	Total
**Steelers**	0	7	0	10	6	**23**
Bengals	0	3	0	14	0	**17**

at Paul Brown Stadium, Cincinnati, Ohio

- Game time: 1:00 p.m. EST
- Game weather: 54 °F (12 °C) (Cloudy)
- Game attendance: 66,049
- Referee: Bill Carollo
- TV announcers (CBS): Ian Eagle (play by play), Solomon Wilcots (color commentator)

Hoping to end their season on a high note, the Steelers flew to Paul Brown Stadium for an AFC North rematch with the Cincinnati Bengals. After a scoreless first quarter, Pittsburgh drew first blood in the second quarter with RB Willie Parker getting a 1-yard TD run. Afterwards, the Bengals managed to salvage a 34-yard field goal by kicker Shayne Graham. After a scoreless third quarter, Cincinnati took the lead by getting a Willie Parker fumble and ending it with QB Carson Palmer completing a 66-yard TD pass to WR Chris Henry. Parker managed to make amends with another 1-yard TD run. However, the Bengals went back into the lead with Palmer completing a 5-yard TD pass to TE Tony Stewart. The Steelers tied the game late with kicker Jeff Reed nailing a 35-yard field goal. Cincinnati quickly managed to get into field goal range, but Graham's 39-yard field goal went wide right. In overtime, Pittsburgh took advantage and won with QB Ben Roethlisberger's 67-yard TD pass to rookie WR Santonio Holmes. With the win, not only did the Steelers end their season at 8–8, but they also wiped out any hope that the Bengals had of reaching the playoffs. Stats

=== Final roster ===
2006 Pittsburgh Steelers roster
**Quarterbacks (QB)**: 16 Charlie Batch; 7 Ben Roethlisberger; 2 Brian St. Pierre; **Running backs (RB)**: 44 Najeh Davenport; 35 Dan Kreider FB; 42 John Kuhn FB; 39 Willie Parker; **Wide receivers (WR)**: 10 Santonio Holmes; 89 Lee Mays; 81 Sean Morey; 86 Hines Ward; 85 Nate Washington; 80 Cedrick Wilson; **Tight ends (TE)**: 83 Heath Miller; 84 Jerame Tuman	**Offensive linemen (OL)**: 74 Willie Colon G; 79 Trai Essex T; 66 Alan Faneca G; 64 Jeff Hartings C; 68 Chris Kemoeatu G; 56 Chukky Okobi C; 62 Marvin Philip G; 73 Kendall Simmons G; 77 Marvel Smith G; 78 Max Starks T; **Defensive linemen (DL)**: 93 Rodney Bailey DE; 98 Casey Hampton NT; 76 Chris Hoke NT; 99 Brett Keisel DE; 90 Travis Kirschke DE; 91 Aaron Smith DE	**Linebackers (LB)**: 51 James Farrior ILB; 50 Larry Foote ILB; 53 Clark Haggans OLB; 92 James Harrison OLB; 57 Clint Kriewaldt ILB; 55 Joey Porter OLB; 95 Richard Seigler OLB; 54 Rian Wallace ILB; **Defensive backs (DB)**: 23 Tyrone Carter SS; 25 Ryan Clark FS; 28 Jovon Johnson CB; 31 Mike Logan SS; 41 Andre Lott SS; 37 Anthony Madison CB; 20 Bryant McFadden CB; 43 Troy Polamalu SS; 27 Anthony Smith FS; 24 Ike Taylor CB; 26 Deshea Townsend CB; **Special teams (ST)**: 17 Chris Gardocki P; 3 Jeff Reed K; 60 Greg Warren LS	**Practice squad**: 13 Marvin Allen WR (IPP); 38 Carey Davis FB; 88 Jonathan Dekker TE; 45 Mike Lorello S; 96 Shaun Nua NT; 65 Scott Paxson DE; 47 Ronald Stanley LB; 71 Brandon Torrey T; 18 Walter Young WR; **Reserve**: 69 Ulish Booker T (IR); 72 Barrett Brooks T (IR); 94 Chad Brown LB (IR); 21 Ricardo Colclough CB (IR); 97 Arnold Harrison LB (IR); 34 Verron Haynes RB (IR); 29 Chidi Iwuoma CB (IR); 15 Willie Reid WR (IR); 19 Isaac West WR (IR); Rookies in italics 53 active, 9 reserve, 9 practice squad

== Standings ==
AFC North
	W	L	T	PCT	DIV	CONF	PF	PA	STK
^{(2)} Baltimore Ravens	13	3	0	.813	5–1	10–2	353	201	W4
Cincinnati Bengals	8	8	0	.500	4–2	6–6	373	331	L3
Pittsburgh Steelers	8	8	0	.500	3–3	5–7	353	315	W1
Cleveland Browns	4	12	0	.250	0–6	3–9	238	356	L4
