= Rian Wallace =

American football player (born 1982)

No. 54
- Position: Linebacker

Personal information
- Born: May 24, 1982 (age 44); Pottstown, Pennsylvania, U.S.
- Listed height: 6 ft 2 in (1.88 m)
- Listed weight: 235 lb (107 kg)

Career information
- High school: Pottstown
- College: Temple
- NFL draft: 2005: 5th round, 166th overall pick

Career history
- Pittsburgh Steelers (2005–2006); Washington Redskins (2008); New York Sentinels (2009); Winnipeg Blue Bombers (2010)

Awards and highlights
- Super Bowl champion (XL); 2× All-Big East (2003-2004)

Career NFL statistics
- Total tackles: 11
- Pass deflections: 1
- Interceptions: 1
- Defensive touchdowns: 1
- Stats at Pro Football Reference

Rian T. Wallace (born May 24, 1982) is an American former professional football player who was a linebacker in the National Football League (NFL). He was selected by the Pittsburgh Steelers in the fifth round of the 2005 NFL draft. He won Super Bowl XL with the team, beating the Seattle Seahawks. He played college football for the Temple Owls. Wallace was also a member of the Washington Redskins, New York Sentinels, and Winnipeg Blue Bombers.

== Professional career ==
Pre-draft measurables
| Height | Weight | Arm length | Hand span | 40-yard dash | 20-yard shuttle | Three-cone drill | Vertical jump | Broad jump | Bench press |
|---|---|---|---|---|---|---|---|---|---|
| 6 ft 2 1/4 in (1.89 m) | 241 lb (109 kg) | 32 3/8 in (0.82 m) | 9 7/8 in (0.25 m) | 4.73 s | 3.97 s | 7.46 s | 35.5 in (0.90 m) | 9 ft 4 in (2.84 m) | 10 reps |
All values from NFL Combine/Pro Day

Wallace was signed by the New York Sentinels of the United Football League on September 9, 2009.

== Personal life ==
Wallace's cousin is college football running back, Rahsul Faison.
