= Brandon Torrey =

American football player (born 1987)

Georgia Tech Yellow Jackets
- Title: Assistant offensive line coach

Personal information
- Born: May 18, 1987 (age 39); Durham, North Carolina, U.S.
- Listed height: 6 ft 5 in (1.96 m)
- Listed weight: 295 lb (134 kg)

Career information
- High school: Northern (Durham, North Carolina)
- College: Howard
- NFL draft: 2005: undrafted

Career history

Playing
- Cologne Centurions (2006); Pittsburgh Steelers (2006–2007); Baltimore Ravens (2007)*; Arizona Cardinals (2007); New York Giants (2007–2008); Tennessee Titans (2008)*; Oakland Raiders (2008); Houston Texans (2009)*; Las Vegas Locomotives (2011)
- * Offseason or practice squad member only

Coaching
- Howard (2015–2016) (Offensive line coach); Monroe College (2017–2018) (Tight ends coach); Norfolk State (2019–2022) (Offensive line coach); Central Michigan (2023–2025) (Tight ends/Tackles coach); Georgia Tech (2026–present) (Assistant offensive line coach)

Awards and highlights
- Super Bowl champion (XLII); 3× All-MEAC (2002-2004)

Brandon Torrey (born May 18, 1985) is an American former professional football player who was an offensive lineman in the National Football League (NFL). He played college football for the Howard Bison and was signed by the Pittsburgh Steelers as an undrafted free agent in 2006.

Torrey accepted an athletic scholarship to attend Howard University in Washington, DC, where he played from 2001 to 2005 and is remembered as a notable alumnus. While at Howard, Torrey set the record for most consecutive starts, and was voted top 10 Guard in the nation for Division 1AA in 2003. In 2004 Torrey won the "Metropolitan Player of the Year" and the Pig Skin Award. He received these awards alongside, Larry Fitzgerald who won college offensive player of the year and Kenechi Udeze who won college defensive player of the year. Other notable names that year were Jeremiah Trotter, Nick Novak. During his time as a Bison, Torrey earned the nickname "Franchise", and received First-team All MEAC (2002-2004), Second-team All-American (2004) and was selected and started in the 2004 HBCU All Star Classic Game.

Torrey was also a member of the Baltimore Ravens, Arizona Cardinals, New York Giants, Tennessee Titans, Houston Texans, and Las Vegas Locomotives. Torrey earned a Super Bowl ring while on the roster of the Giants in Super Bowl XLII, although he was not eligible to play.

In 2011, Torrey joined the Las Vegas Locomotives as an Offensive Tackle and Guard and served as team Captain. This was the 3rd consecutive year this UFL team made it to the championship game.

Torrey served as a volunteer assistant at Howard in 2015 as he finished his degree. He was named the offensive line coach in 2016. In 2019, Torrey was hired as the offensive line coach at Norfolk State. In 2023, Torrey was hired as the tight ends and tackles coach at Central Michigan. In 2026, Torrey was hired as the assistant offensive line coach at Georgia Tech.
