= Marvin Philip =

American football player (born 1982)

No. 62, 50
- Position: Center

Personal information
- Born: February 3, 1982 (age 44); Redwood City, California, U.S.
- Listed height: 6 ft 1 in (1.85 m)
- Listed weight: 300 lb (136 kg)

Career information
- High school: El Dorado Hills (CA) Oak Ridge
- College: California
- NFL draft: 2006: 6th round, 201st overall pick

Career history
- Pittsburgh Steelers (2006–2007); Cleveland Browns (2007); Baltimore Ravens (2008)*; New Orleans Saints (2008)*; Buffalo Bills (2009); Omaha Nighthawks (2010)
- * Offseason or practice squad member only

Awards and highlights
- Second-team All-American (2004); 2× First-team All-Pac-10 (2004, 2005)

Marvin Ashley Philip (born February 3, 1982) is an American former professional football center. He was selected by the Pittsburgh Steelers in the sixth round of the 2006 NFL draft. He played college football at California.

Philip was also a member of the Cleveland Browns, Baltimore Ravens, New Orleans Saints, Buffalo Bills and Omaha Nighthawks.

== Early life ==
He played football at San Mateo High School in San Mateo, California, and Oak Ridge High School in El Dorado Hills, California.

== College career ==
Philip played college football at the University of California, Berkeley, interrupting school for two years to serve on a mission in the Dakotas for the Church of Jesus Christ of Latter-day Saints. He was an All-American in 2004 and 2005. He was also named the team's offensive MVP in his senior year.

== Professional career ==
Pre-draft measurables
Height	Weight	Arm length	Hand span	40-yard dash	10-yard split	20-yard split	20-yard shuttle	Three-cone drill	Vertical jump	Broad jump	Bench press
6 ft 1 in (1.85 m)	307 lb (139 kg)	33 1/4 in (0.84 m)	10 1/8 in (0.26 m)	5.24 s	1.83 s	2.98 s	4.69 s	7.59 s	27.0 in (0.69 m)	8 ft 0 in (2.44 m)	27 reps
All values from NFL Combine/Pro Day

Philip was selected in the sixth round of the 2006 NFL draft by the Pittsburgh Steelers. He played in eight preseason games for Pittsburgh between 2006 and 2007, but never made the field in a regular season game. He was out of the NFL by 2008. Philip was signed by Omaha Nighthawks of the United Football League on August 21, 2010.

== Personal life ==
Philip is of Tongan descent. He appeared as an entrepreneur on the October 5, 2012, episode of the ABC television show Shark Tank. He was seeking investors for his product, a specialized laundry hamper called Lifter Hamper. All of the "sharks" declined to invest. The product was later acquired & is currently sold globally by Honey-Can-Do, as the “Bounce Back Hamper”.
