= 2010 Florida Tuskers season =

American football league season

- Owner: Joe Theismann
- General manager: Jay Gruden
- Head coach: Jay Gruden
- Home stadium: Citrus Bowl

Results
- Record: 5–3
- Division place: 2nd
- Playoffs: Lost Championship Game (Las Vegas) 23–20

Uniform

The 2010 Florida Tuskers season was the second and final season for the Virginia Destroyers as the Florida Tuskers. They finished with a 5–3 regular season record and lost in the 2010 UFL Championship Game to the Las Vegas Locomotives for a second straight season.

== Offseason ==
Head coach Jim Haslett left the team in January 2010, becoming the new defensive coordinator for the Washington Redskins. On February 9, 2010, Jay Gruden was named the team's new head coach and general manager by UFL commissioner Michael Huyghue. On the same day of Gruden's appointment, the Tampa Bay Rays were announced to have sold their interest in the franchise, which meant that all home games for the Tuskers would be played at the Citrus Bowl in Orlando.

Along with the league's other teams, the Tuskers unveiled new uniforms during an event at Fashion Show Mall in Las Vegas on July 28, 2010.

=== UFL draft ===
2010 Florida Tuskers UFL draft selections
Draft order		Player name	Position	College
Round	Choice	Player name	Position	College
1	4	Weston Dacus	LB	Arkansas
2	9	Arnold Harrison	LB	Georgia
3	14	John Standeford	WR	Purdue
4	19	Erik Pedersen	LB	Portland State
5	24	Tyrrell Herbert	S	Toledo
6	29	Adrien Clarke	OL	Ohio State
7	33	Kevin Harris	FB	Wake Forest
8	37	Cortez Hankton	WR	Texas Southern
9	41	Corey Small	DB	Florida Atlantic
10	50	Chris Perri	DE	Stony Brook
11	54	Greg Middleton	DE	Indiana
12	58	Melvin Fowler	C	Maryland

== Staff ==
2010 Florida Tuskers staff
Front office: Owner/president – Joe Theismann; Director of football operations – Diane Clark; Director of player personnel – Bret Munsey; Head coaches: Head coach/general manager – Jay Gruden; Offensive coaches: Running backs – Kurt Beathard; Wide receivers – Ike Hilliard; Tight ends – Robert McFarland; Offensive line – Bill Laveroni; Offensive line assistant – Jerry Sisemore; Offensive quality control – James MacPherson	Defensive coaches: Defensive coordinator/linebackers – Chuck Bresnahan; Defensive line – Kerry Locklin; Defensive backs – Bill Bradley; Assistant defensive backs – Bret Munsey; Defensive quality control – Fred Pagac, Jr.; Special teams coaches: Special teams – Al Roberts; Special teams assistant – Jim Lanford; Strength and conditioning: Strength and conditioning – John Hastings; Equipment staff: Head manager - Casey Turley; Assistant - Bryan Wright; Assistant - Tom Dillard

== Roster ==
2010 Florida Tuskers final roster
Quarterbacks: 8 Brooks Bollinger; 14 Chris Greisen; Running backs: 40 James Develin; 43 Maurice Hicks; 33 Dominic Rhodes; 38 J. D. Runnels; Wide receivers: 87 Brian Clark; 19 Chas Gessner; 81 Cortez Hankton; 17 Maurice Price; 88 Calvin Russell; 82 John Standeford; Tight ends: 80 Jason Pociask; 84 Galen Stone; 85 Jermaine Wiggins	Offensive linemen: 65 Josh Beekman G/C; 63 Adrien Clarke G; 66 Anthony Davis G; 76 Na'Shan Goddard T; 71 Steve Justice G; 58 Enoka Lucas C; 70 Shane Olivea T; 73 Torrin Tucker T; 75 Seth Wand T; 72 Kyle Young G/C; Defensive linemen: 68 McKinley Boykin DT; 56 Patrick Chukwurah DE; 53 Joe Clermond DE; 74 Grady Jackson DT; 96 Eric Moore DE; 98 Bryan Save DT; 93 Darrion Scott DE; 95 Claude Wroten DT	Linebackers: 57 Darryl Blackstock OLB; 97 Arnold Harrison OLB; 54 Jeremy Leman OLB; 59 Tim McGarigle MLB; 55 Terrence Melton OLB; 50 Tony Taylor MLB; 52 Odell Thurman OLB; Defensive backs: 23 Jerome Carter FS; 26 Simeon Castille CB; 29 Keith Davis SS; 21 Cletis Gordon CB; 44 Herana-Daze Jones SS; 34 Kevin Kaesviharn FS; 20 Keiwan Ratliff CB; 27 Corey Small CB; 24 Darius Vinnett CB	Special teams: 9 Nick Novak K; 13 Ken Parrish P; 49 Ryan Senser LS; Reserve lists: 34 Fakhir Brown CB (IR); 57 Weston Dacus OLB (IR); 96 Chris Harrington DE (IR); 74 Langston Moore DT (IR); 91 Eric Powell DE (IR); 32 J. R. Reed SS (IR); 22 Nate Salley FS (IR); 51 Anthony Schlegel MLB (IR); 31 DeJuan Tribble CB (IR); 15 Huey Whittaker WR (IR); rookies in italics 52 Active, 10 Inactive

== Schedule ==
Round	Date	Opponent	Result	Record	Venue	Attendance
1	September 18	at Las Vegas Locomotives	W 27–20	1–0	Sam Boyd Stadium	9,103
2	September 25	at Sacramento Mountain Lions	L 20–24	1–1	Hornet Stadium	20,000
3	September 30	Las Vegas Locomotives	L 17–20	1–2	Citrus Bowl	9,053
4	October 9	at Hartford Colonials	W 33–20	2–2	Rentschler Field	14,468
5	Bye					
6	October 21	Sacramento Mountain Lions	L 17–21	2–3	Citrus Bowl	10,066
7	Bye					
8	November 5	Omaha Nighthawks	W 31–14	3–3	Citrus Bowl	9,203
9	November 11	Hartford Colonials	W 41–7	4–3	Citrus Bowl	9,367
10	November 19	at Omaha Nighthawks	W 27–10	5–3	Rosenblatt Stadium	21,106

=== Championship game ===
Round	Date	Opponent	Result	Record	Venue
Championship	November 27	Las Vegas Locomotives	L 20–23	0–1	Rosenblatt Stadium

== Standings ==
United Football League
	W	L	T	PCT	PF	PA	STK
y-Las Vegas Locomotives	5	3	0	.625	174	142	L2
y-Florida Tuskers	5	3	0	.625	213	136	W3
Sacramento Mountain Lions	4	4	0	.500	169	164	W2
Hartford Colonials	3	5	0	.375	169	194	W1
Omaha Nighthawks	3	5	0	.375	113	202	L4

y-denotes team has clinched a 2010 UFL championship game berth

== Game summaries ==
=== Week 1: at Las Vegas Locomotives ===
Quarter	1	2	3	4	Total
Tuskers	0	17	10	0	27
Locomotives	10	0	7	3	20

at Sam Boyd Stadium, Whitney, Nevada

- Date: Saturday, September 18
- Game time: 11:00 p.m. ET
- Game attendance: 9,103
- Referee: Jon Bible
- TV announcers (HDNet): Kenny Rice (play-by-play) and Paul Maguire (analyst)
- Tuskers at Locomotives recap

Game information

1st quarter

- Las vegas – Teddy Lehman 26-yard interception return (Parker Douglass kick), 9:00
- Las vegas – Parker Douglass 32-yard field goal, 2:46

2nd quarter

- Florida – Dominic Rhodes 8-yard pass from Brooks Bollinger (Nick Novak kick), 12:36
- Florida – Dominic Rhodes 1-yard run (Nick Novak kick), 9:20
- Florida – Nick Novak 54-yard field goal, 0:52

3rd quarter

- Las vegas – Bobby Rome 1-yard pass from Tim Rattay (Parker Douglass kick), 8:09
- Florida – Nick Novak 24-yard field goal, 2:52
- Florida – Calvin Russell 68-yard pass from Brooks Bollinger (Nick Novak kick), 0:10

4th quarter

- Las vegas – Parker Douglass 25-yard field goal, 4:49

Passing

- Florida – Brooks Bollinger: 22/37, 308 yards, 2 TD, 1 INT
- Las vegas – Tim Rattay: 22/38, 173 yards, 1 TD, 2 INT

Rushing

- Florida – Aveion Cason: 14 att, 83 yards
- Las vegas – Marcel Shipp: 13 att, 48 yards

Receiving

- Florida – Cortez Hankton: 6 rec, 93 yards
- Las vegas – Adam Bergen: 7 rec, 54 yards

=== Week 2: at Sacramento Mountain Lions ===
Quarter	1	2	3	4	Total
Tuskers	3	7	7	3	20
Mountain Lions	0	7	0	17	24

at Hornet Stadium, Sacramento, California

- Date: Saturday, September 25
- Game time: 11:00 p.m. ET
- Game attendance: 20,000
- Referee: David Cutaia
- TV announcers (Versus): Craig Minervini (play-by-play) and Doug Flutie (analyst)
- Tuskers at Mountain Lions recap

Game information

1st quarter

- Florida – Nick Novak 48-yard field goal, 9:41

2nd quarter

- Sacramento – Rod Windsor 4-yard pass from Daunte Culpepper (Fabrizio Scaccia kick), 8:56
- Florida – Cortez Hankton 14-yard pass from Brooks Bollinger (Nick Novak kick), 1:22

3rd quarter

- Florida – Dominic Rhodes 1-yard run (Nick Novak kick), 8:21

4th quarter

- Sacramento – Fabrizio Scaccia 54-yard field goal, 14:48
- Sacramento – Darrell Strong 2-yard pass from Daunte Culpepper (Fabrizio Scaccia kick), 7:04
- Florida – Nick Novak 30-yard field goal, 2:53
- Sacramento – Rod Windsor 33-yard pass from Daunte Culpepper (Fabrizio Scaccia kick), 0:37

Passing

- Florida – Brooks Bollinger: 23/41, 328 yards, 1 TD, 1 INT
- Sacramento – Daunte Culpepper: 26/42, 374 yards, 3 TD, 1 INT

Rushing

- Florida – Dominic Rhodes: 13 att, 51 yards, 1 TD
- Sacramento – Cory Ross: 14 att, 28 yards

Receiving

- Florida – Cortez Hankton: 6 rec, 110 yards, 1 TD
- Sacramento – Cory Ross: 8 rec, 57 yards

=== Week 3: vs. Las Vegas Locomotives ===
Quarter	1	2	3	4	Total
Locomotives	7	3	0	10	20
Tuskers	0	10	0	7	17

at Citrus Bowl, Orlando, Florida

- Date: Thursday, September 30
- Game time: 6:00 p.m. ET
- Game attendance: 9,054
- Referee: Perry Havener
- TV: Versus
- Locomotives at Tuskers recap

Game information

1st quarter

- Las vegas – Samie Parker 68-yard pass from Tim Rattay (Parker Douglass kick), 0:02

2nd quarter

- Las vegas – Parker Douglass 20-yard field goal, 7:24
- Florida – Nick Novak 45-yard field goal, 2:33
- Florida – Dominic Rhodes 14-yard run (Nick Novak kick), 1:31

3rd quarter

no scoring

4th quarter

- Florida – Cortez Hankton 13-yard pass from Brooks Bollinger (Nick Novak kick), 6:36
- Las vegas – Andrae Thurman 15-yard pass from Tim Rattay (Parker Douglass kick), 4:13
- Las vegas – Parker Douglass 21-yard field goal, 0:00

Passing

- Las vegas – Tim Rattay: 28/38, 328 yards, 2 TD, 1 INT
- Florida – Brooks Bollinger: 19/30, 136 yards, 1 TD

Rushing

- Las vegas – DeDe Dorsey: 14 att, 99 yards
- Florida – Dominic Rhodes: 11 att, 54 yards, 1 TD

Receiving

- Las vegas – DeDe Dorsey: 7 rec, 105 yards
- Florida – Jason Pociask: 3 rec, 46 yards

=== Week 4: at Hartford Colonials ===
Quarter	1	2	3	4	Total
Tuskers	3	7	13	10	33
Colonials	3	10	0	7	20

at Rentschler Field, East Hartford, Connecticut

- Date: Saturday, October 9, 2010
- Game time: 3:00 p.m. ET
- Game attendance: 14,468
- Referee: Jon Bible
- TV: Versus
- Tuskers at Colonials recap

Game information

1st quarter

- Hartford – Taylor Mehlhaff 19-yard field goal, 6:43
- Florida – Nick Novak 29-yard field goal, 3:04

2nd quarter

- Florida – Aveion Cason 1-yard run (Nick Novak kick), 5:11
- Hartford – Taylor Mehlhaff 35-yard field goal, 3:34
- Hartford – Gerard Lawson 41-yard interception return (Taylor Mehlhaff kick), 2:13

3rd quarter

- Florida – Nick Novak 42-yard field goal, 9:39
- Florida – Nick Novak 24-yard field goal, 2:37
- Florida – Jermaine Wiggins 2-yard pass from Brooks Bollinger (Nick Novak kick), 0:56

4th quarter

- Hartford – Ronnie Ghent 2-yard pass from Josh McCown (Taylor Mehlhaff kick), 9:12
- Florida – Nick Novak 38-yard field goal, 2:29
- Florida – Dominic Rhodes 16-yard run (Nick Novak kick), 1:53

Passing

- Florida – Brooks Bollinger: 15/33, 155 yards, 1 TD, 1 INT
- Hartford – Josh McCown: 18/36, 223 yards, 1 TD, 1 INT

Rushing

- Florida – Dominic Rhodes: 20 att, 103 yards, 1 TD
- Hartford – Andre Dixon: 11 att, 24 yards

Receiving

- Florida – Jermaine Wiggins: 4 rec, 18 yards, 1 TD
- Hartford – Lorenzo Booker: 5 rec, 32 yards

=== Week 6: vs. Sacramento Mountain Lions ===
Quarter	1	2	3	4	Total
Mountain Lions	0	7	2	12	21
Tuskers	10	0	0	7	17

at Citrus Bowl, Orlando, Florida

- Date: Thursday, October 21, 2010
- Game time: 7:00 p.m. ET
- Game attendance: 10,066
- Referee: Chris Snead
- TV: HDNet
- Mountain Lions at Tuskers recap

Game information

1st quarter

- Florida – Nick Novak 48-yard field goal, 10:13
- Florida – Dominic Rhodes 3-yard run (Nick Novak kick), 1:37

2nd quarter

- Sacramento – Marcus Maxwell 6-yard pass from Daunte Culpepper (Fabrizio Scaccia kick), 2:07

3rd quarter

- Sacramento – Maurice Crum safety, 3:25

4th quarter

- Sacramento – Fabrizio Scaccia 27-yard field goal, 11:28
- Florida – Dominic Rhodes 4-yard run (Nick Novak kick), 8:34
- Sacramento – Daunte Culpepper 10-yard run (Daunte Culpepper pass no good), 2:00
- Sacramento – Fabrizio Scaccia 39-yard field goal, 0:33

Passing

- Sacramento – Daunte Culpepper: 31/49, 237 yards, 1 TD, 1 INT
- Florida – Brooks Bollinger: 12/23, 102 yards, 1 INT

Rushing

- Sacramento – Cory Ross: 25 att, 70 yards
- Florida – Dominic Rhodes: 18 att, 60 yards, 2 TD

Receiving

- Sacramento – Cory Ross: 10 rec, 66 yards
- Florida – Maurice Hicks: 4 rec, 41 yards

=== Week 8: vs. Omaha Nighthawks ===
Quarter	1	2	3	4	Total
Nighthawks	0	0	0	14	14
Tuskers	7	7	17	0	31

at Citrus Bowl, Orlando, Florida

- Date: Friday, November 5, 2010
- Game time: 8:00 p.m. ET
- Game attendance: 9,203
- Referee: Jon Bible
- TV: HDNet
- Nighthawks at Tuskers recap

Game information

1st quarter

- Florida – Huey Whittaker 2-yard pass from Chris Greisen (Nick Novak kick), 2:42

2nd quarter

- Florida – Calvin Russell 26-yard pass from Chris Greisen (Nick Novak kick), 7:03

3rd quarter

- Florida – Dominic Rhodes 65-yard run (Nick Novak kick), 10:32
- Florida – Keiwan Ratliff 29-yard interception return (Nick Novak kick), 10:17
- Florida – Nick Novak 42-yard field goal, 0:48

4th quarter

- Omaha – Jeb Putzier 2-yard pass from Matt Gutierrez (Jeff Wolfert kick), 11:16
- Omaha – Robert Ferguson 0-yard fumble recovery (Jeff Wolfert kick), 5:15

Passing

- Omaha – Matt Gutierrez: 17/34, 188 yards, 1 TD, 1 INT
- Florida – Chris Greisen: 23/31, 215 yards, 2 TD, 1 INT

Rushing

- Omaha – Shaud Williams: 7 att, 18 yards
- Florida – Dominic Rhodes: 11 att, 111 yards, 1 TD

Receiving

- Omaha – Maurice Clarett: 5 rec, 38 yards
- Florida – Calvin Russell: 6 rec, 61 yards, 1 TD

=== Week 9: vs. Hartford Colonials ===
Quarter	1	2	3	4	Total
Colonials	0	0	7	0	7
Tuskers	14	24	3	0	41

at Citrus Bowl, Orlando, Florida

- Date: Thursday, November 11, 2010
- Game time: 7:00 p.m. ET
- Game attendance: 9,367
- Referee: David Cuttia
- TV: HDNet
- Colonials at Tuskers recap

Game information

1st quarter

- Florida – Dominic Rhodes 2-yard run (Nick Novak kick), 11:46
- Florida – Terrence Melton 70-yard fumble return (Nick Novak kick), 5:54

2nd quarter

- Florida – Nick Novak 39-yard field goal, 14:56
- Florida – Chas Gessner 15-yard pass from Chris Greisen (Nick Novak kick), 10:57
- Florida – Dominic Rhodes 30-yard run (Nick Novak kick), 4:36
- Florida – Chas Gessner 7-yard pass from Chris Greisen (Nick Novak kick), 0:11

3rd quarter

- Florida – Nick Novak 44-yard field goal, 4:41
- Hartford – Ryan Perrilloux 12-yard run (Sam Swank kick), 0:42

4th quarter

no scoring

Passing

- Hartford – Ryan Perrilloux: 16/35, 184 yards
- Florida – Chris Greisen: 17/23, 237 yards, 2 TD, 1 INT

Rushing

- Hartford – Tory Harrison: 8 att, 22 yards
- Florida – Dominic Rhodes: 20 att, 102 yards, 2 TD

Receiving

- Hartford – Ronnie Ghent: 3 rec, 42 yards
- Florida – Calvin Russell: 3 rec, 55 yards

=== Week 10: at Omaha Nighthawks ===
Quarter	1	2	3	4	Total
Tuskers	7	3	10	7	27
Nighthawks	0	3	0	7	10

at Johnny Rosenblatt Stadium, Omaha, Nebraska

- Date: Friday, November 19, 2010
- Game time: 8:30 p.m. ET
- Game attendance: 21,106
- Referee: Perry Havener
- TV: HDNet
- Tuskers at Nighthawks recap

Game information

1st quarter

- Florida – Darius Vinnett 45-yard interception return (Nick Novak kick), 13:32

2nd quarter

- Florida – Nick Novak 46-yard field goal, 7:01
- Omaha – Jeff Wolfert 24-yard field goal, 1:44

3rd quarter

- Florida – Calvin Russell 35-yard pass from Chris Greisen (Nick Novak kick), 6:36
- Florida – Nick Novak 51-yard field goal, 1:22

4th quarter

- Omaha – Roy Hall 13-yard pass from Jeff Garcia (Jeff Wolfert kick), 6:28
- Florida – Keiwan Ratliff 58-yard interception return (Nick Novak kick), 0:56

Passing

- Omaha – Jeff Garcia: 17/35, 133 yards, 1 TD, 2 INT
- Florida – Chris Greisen: 17/26, 200 yards, 1 TD

Rushing

- Omaha – Maurice Clarett: 12 att, 69 yards
- Florida – Dominic Rhodes: 22 att, 52 yards

Receiving

- Omaha – Devard Darling: 5 rec, 51 yards
- Florida – Brian Clark: 2 rec, 59 yards

== Championship game ==
Quarter	1	2	Total
Tuskers			0
Locomotives			0

at Johnny Rosenblatt Stadium, Omaha, Nebraska

- Date: Saturday, November 27, 2010
- Game time: Noon ET
- TV: Versus
