= 2010 Las Vegas Locomotives season =

American football team season

- Owner: Bill Hambrecht
- General manager: Jim Fassel
- Head coach: Jim Fassel
- Home stadium: Sam Boyd Stadium

Results
- Record: 5–3
- Division place: 1st
- Playoffs: Won Championship Game (Florida) 23–20

The 2010 Las Vegas Locomotives season was the team's second season in the United Football League. They finished with a 5–3 record and defended their UFL Championship by defeating the Florida Tuskers, 23–20, in the 2010 UFL Championship Game.

== Offseason ==
=== UFL draft ===
2010 Las Vegas Locomotives UFL draft selections
Draft order		Player name	Position	College
Round	Choice	Player name	Position	College
1	5	Dominic Payne	LB	Western State
2	10	Michael Ray Garvin	CB	Florida State
3	15	Brian Coulter	DE	Missouri
4	20	Ryan Considine	OT	Louisiana Tech
5	25	Jovonte Taylor	WR	Hawaii
6	30	Russ Weil	FB	Illinois
7	34	Cliff Washburn	OT	The Citadel
8	38	Eddy Newton	WR	Baylor
9	42	Tony Parrish	S	Washington
10	46	Lewis Baker	S	Oklahoma
11	55	Alex Henderson	RB	Northern Arizona
12	59	Gabe Long	DT	Utah

== Staff ==
2010 Las Vegas Locomotives staff
Front office: Owner – Bill Hambrecht; Owner – Rob Ryan; Director of football operations – Chuck Shelton; Player personnel – Randy Ball; Football operations – Mike Fassel; Head coaches: Head coach/general manager – Jim Fassel; Offensive coaches: Quarterbacks – Eric Van Heusen; Running backs – Amp Lee; Wide receivers – Mike Wilson; Tight ends – Gregg Brandon; Offensive line – Don Eck	Defensive coaches: Defensive coordinator/special teams coordinator – Larry Mac Duff; Defensive line – Kevin Wolthausen; Linebackers/Assistant Special Teams – Dennis Therrell; Secondary – Isaac Carter; Secondary – Larry Marmie; Strength and conditioning: Head strength – Chris Clausen

== Roster ==
2010 Las Vegas Locomotives final roster
Quarterbacks: 2 Chase Clement; 12 Russ Michna; 16 Drew Willy; Running backs: 1 DeDe Dorsey; 22 Hakim Hill; 35 Bobby Rome II; 26 Marcel Shipp; Wide receivers: 11 B. J. Dennard; 18 Brian Hernandez; 85 Samie Parker; 13 Tab Perry; 81 Andrae Thurman; Tight ends: 87 Adam Bergen; 88 Dezmond Sherrod; 84 George Wrighster	Offensive linemen: 79 Jesse Boone C; 75 Branndon Braxton T; 70 Jason Capizzi T; 63 Andrew Crummey C; 53 Frank Davis G; 62 Anthony Oakley G; 76 Herb Taylor G/T; 72 Albert Toeaina T; 73 Brandon Walker G; Defensive linemen: 95 Adrian Awasom DE; 91 Ryan Boschetti DT; 92 Josh Cooper DE; 50 Eric Henderson DE; 78 Ross Kolodziej DT; 96 Antwan Lake DT; 98 Alfred Malone DT; 97 Lauvale Sape DT	Linebackers: 59 Ezra Butler OLB; 54 Kris Griffin OLB; 90 Edgerton Hartwell MLB; 57 Teddy Lehman OLB; 56 Brandon Moore OLB; 55 Marcus Riley MLB; 51 Brian Toal OLB; Defensive backs: 43 Lewis Baker FS; 24 Wale Dada CB; 32 Jameel Dowling CB; 25 Coye Francies CB; 23 Kevin Hobbs CB; 34 Jamal Lewis FS; 20 Brandon Sumrall CB; 36 Isaiah Trufant CB; 27 C. J. Wallace SS; 33 Trey Young SS	Special teams: 8 Danny Baugher P; 9 Stephen Hauschka K; 60 Rigo Morales LS; Reserve lists: 3 Tim Rattay QB (IR); rookies in italics 52 Active, 1 Inactive

== Schedule ==
Round	Date	Opponent	Result	Record	Venue	Attendance
1	September 18	Florida Tuskers	L 20–27	0–1	Sam Boyd Stadium	9,103
2	Bye					
3	September 30	at Florida Tuskers	W 20–17	1–1	Citrus Bowl	9,053
4	October 8	Omaha Nighthawks	W 22–10	2–1	Sam Boyd Stadium	9,767
5	October 15	at Sacramento Mountain Lions	W 26–3	3–1	Hornet Stadium	19,000
6	October 23	Hartford Colonials	W 24–21 (OT)	4–1	Sam Boyd Stadium	8,451
7	October 28	at Omaha Nighthawks	W 24–10	5–1	Rosenblatt Stadium	23,554
8	November 6	Sacramento Mountain Lions	L 24–27	5–2	Sam Boyd Stadium	13,622
9	Bye					
10	November 20	at Hartford Colonials	L 14–27	5–3	Rentschler Field	14,554

== Standings ==
United Football League
	W	L	T	PCT	PF	PA	STK
y-Las Vegas Locomotives	5	3	0	.625	174	142	L2
y-Florida Tuskers	5	3	0	.625	213	136	W3
Sacramento Mountain Lions	4	4	0	.500	169	164	W2
Hartford Colonials	3	5	0	.375	169	194	W1
Omaha Nighthawks	3	5	0	.375	113	202	L4

y-denotes team has clinched a 2010 UFL championship game berth

== Game summaries ==
=== Week 1: vs. Florida Tuskers ===
Week One: Florida Tuskers at Las Vegas Locomotives – Game summary

Quarter	1	2	3	4	Total
Tuskers	0	17	10	0	27
Locomotives	10	0	7	3	20

at Sam Boyd Stadium, Whitney, Nevada

- Date: Saturday, September 18
- Game time: 8:00 p.m. PT
- Game attendance: 9,103
- Referee: Jon Bible
- TV announcers (HDNet): Kenny Rice (play-by-play) and Paul Maguire (analyst)
- Recap

Game information

1st quarter

- LV – Teddy Lehman 26 yard interception return (Parker Douglass kick), 9:00
- LV – Parker Douglass 32 yard field goal, 2:46

2nd quarter

- FL – Dominic Rhodes 8 yard pass from Brooks Bollinger (Nick Novak kick), 12:36
- FL – Dominic Rhodes 1 yard run (Nick Novak kick), 9:20
- FL – Nick Novak 54 yard field goal, 0:52

3rd quarter

- LV – Bobby Rome 1 yard pass from Tim Rattay (Parker Douglass kick), 8:09
- FL – Nick Novak 24 yard field goal, 2:52
- FL – Calvin Russell 68 yard pass from Brooks Bollinger (Nick Novak kick), 0:10

4th quarter

- LV – Parker Douglass 25 yard field goal, 4:49

Top passers

- FL – Brooks Bollinger – 22/37, 308 yards, 2 touchdowns, 1 interception
- LV – Tim Rattay – 22/38, 173 yards, 1 touchdown, 2 interceptions

Top rushers

- FL – Aveion Cason – 14 rushes, 83 yards
- LV – Marcel Shipp – 13 rushes, 48 yards

Top receivers

- FL – Cortez Hankton – 6 receptions, 93 yards
- LV – Adam Bergen – 7 receptions, 54 yards

=== Week 3: at Florida Tuskers ===
Week Three: Las Vegas Locomotives at Florida Tuskers – Game summary

Quarter	1	2	3	4	Total
Locomotives	7	3	0	10	20
Tuskers	0	10	0	7	17

at Citrus Bowl, Orlando, Florida

- Date: Thursday, September 30
- Game time: 3:00 p.m. PT
- Game attendance: 9,054
- Referee: Perry Havener
- TV announcers (Versus): Craig Minervini (play-by-play) and Doug Flutie (analyst)
- Recap

=== Week 4: vs. Omaha Nighthawks ===
Week Four: Omaha Nighthawks at Las Vegas Locomotives – Game summary

Quarter	1	2	3	4	Total
Nighthawks	7	3	0	0	10
Locomotives	3	13	0	6	22

at Sam Boyd Stadium, Whitney, Nevada

- Date: Friday, October 8
- Game time: 7:00 p.m. PT
- Game attendance: 9,767
- Referee: Chris Snead
- TV announcers (HDNet): Kenny Rice (play-by-play) and Paul Maguire (analyst)
- Recap

=== Week 5: at Sacramento Mountain Lions ===
Week Five: Las Vegas Locomotives at Sacramento Mountain Lions – Game summary

Quarter	1	2	3	4	Total
Locomotives	6	3	0	17	26
Mountain Lions	0	3	0	0	3

at Hornet Stadium, Sacramento, California

- Date: Friday, October 15
- Game time: 8:00 p.m. PT
- Game attendance: 19,000
- Referee: Perry Havener
- TV announcers (HDNet): Kenny Rice (play-by-play) and Paul Maguire (analyst)
- Recap

=== Week 6: vs. Hartford Colonials ===
Week Six: Hartford Colonials at Las Vegas Locomotives – Game summary

Quarter	1	2	3	4	OT	Total
Colonials	0	13	0	8	0	21
Locomotives	0	7	7	7	3	24

at Sam Boyd Stadium, Whitney, Nevada

- Date: Saturday, October 23
- Game time: 12:30 p.m. PT
- Game attendance: 8,451
- Referee: Perry Havener
- TV announcers (Versus): Craig Minervini (play-by-play) and Doug Flutie (analyst)
- Recap

=== Week 7: at Omaha Nighthawks ===
Week Seven: Las Vegas Locomotives at Omaha Nighthawks – Game summary

Quarter	1	2	3	4	Total
Locomotives	0	7	3	14	24
Nighthawks	0	7	3	0	10

at Johnny Rosenblatt Stadium, Omaha, Nebraska

- Date: Thursday, October 28
- Game time: 5:00 p.m. PT
- Game attendance: 23,554
- Referee: Dave Cutaia
- TV announcers (HDNet): Kenny Rice (play-by-play) and Paul Maguire (analyst)
- Recap

=== Week 8: vs. Sacramento Mountain Lions ===
Week Six: Sacramento Mountain Lions at Las Vegas Locomotives – Game summary

Quarter	1	2	3	4	Total
Mountain Lions	7	14	0	6	27
Locomotives	0	3	7	14	24

at Sam Boyd Stadium, Whitney, Nevada

- Date: Saturday, November 6
- Game time: 10:00 p.m. PT
- Game attendance: 13,622
- Referee: Dave Cutaia
- TV announcers (Versus): Craig Minervini (play-by-play) and Doug Flutie (analyst)
- Recap

Sacramento attempted to avenge a 26–3 home loss earlier in the season to Las Vegas and did so with a 27–24 win on the road at Sam Boyd Stadium. The Mountain Lions survived a scare after the Locos tied the game at 24 in the fourth quarter, after Sacramento lead 21–0 in the second. Chase Clement was stellar in his debut for the Locos, throwing a touchdown and running for two in Las Vegas's comeback attempt that came up just a bit short.

=== Week 10: at Hartford Colonials ===
Week Ten: Las Vegas Locomotives at Hartford Colonials – Game summary

Quarter	1	2	3	4	Total
Locomotives	0	7	0	7	14
Colonials	10	10	7	0	27

at Rentschler Field, East Hartford, Connecticut

- Date: Saturday, November 20
- Game time: 12:30 p.m. PT
- Game attendance: 14,554
- Referee: Chris Snead
- TV announcers (Versus): Craig Minervini (play-by-play) and Doug Flutie (analyst)
- Recap
