= 2010 Sacramento Mountain Lions season =

- Owner: Paul Pelosi
- General manager: Dennis Green
- Head coach: Dennis Green
- Home stadium: Hornet Stadium

Results
- Record: 4–4
- Division place: 3rd
- Playoffs: did not qualify

Uniform

The 2010 Sacramento Mountain Lions season was the second season for the Sacramento Mountain Lions and the first season after the team relocated from the San Francisco Bay Area. The team finished with a 4–4 record and third in the league.

== Offseason ==
After unusually poor attendance at the California Redwoods' 2009 home games (the team was the only one to not have a single game with an attendance of over 10,000 fans), the Redwoods announced they would be leaving AT&T Park in San Francisco for either San Jose, California or Sacramento, California. Sacramento (and Hornet Stadium) was ultimately chosen, and the team was renamed the "Sacramento Mountain Lions" in a fan contest.

=== UFL draft ===
2010 Sacramento Mountain Lions UFL draft selections
Draft order		Player name	Position	College
Round	Choice	Player name	Position	College
1	3	Justin Goltz	QB	Occidental
2	8	Tavita Thompson	OT	Oregon State
3	13	Tim Clark	CB	Oregon State
4	18	Udeme Udofia	DT	Stanford
5	23	Ryan McFoy	S	Arizona State
6	28	Antonio Chatman	WR	Cincinnati
7	32	Carl Spitale	OT	Florida Atlantic
8	36	Dennis Keyes	S	UCLA
9	45	Bobby Guillory	WR	Central Missouri
10	49	Curtis Young	DE	Cincinnati
11	53	Willie Glasper	CB	Oregon
12	57	Terrence Blevins	RB	Eastern Michigan

== Staff ==
2010 Sacramento Mountain Lions staff
Front office: Majority owner – Paul Pelosi; Minority owner – Angelo Tsakopoulos; Minority owner – George Zimmer; Minority owner – Dave Lucchetti; Minority owner – George Marcus; Director of football operations – Sid Pillai; Player personnel – Robert Griffith; Head coaches: Head coach/general manager – Dennis Green; Offensive coaches: Offensive coordinator/quarterbacks – Mike Kruczek; Running backs – Mike McDaniel; Wide receivers – Charles Collins; Tight ends/assistant offensive line – Bill Khayat; Offensive line – Art Kehoe	Defensive coaches: Defensive coordinator/linebackers – Ricky Hunley; Defensive line – DeChon Burns; Defensive backs – Steve Shafer; Safeties – Robert Griffith; Special teams coaches: Special teams coordinator/defensive assistant – Martin Bayless; Special teams assistant – Steven Hoppe; Strength and conditioning: Strength and conditioning – Michael Rehfeldt

== Roster ==
2010 Sacramento Mountain Lions final roster
Quarterbacks: 12 Richard Bartel; 8 Daunte Culpepper; 7 Liam O'Hagan; Running backs: 26 Steve Baylark; 44 Tyler Clutts; 20 Cory Ross; 28 John David Washington; Wide receivers: 18 Otis Amey; 17 Taye Biddle; 80 Jayson Foster; 13 Marcus Maxwell; 19 Joe West; 11 Rod Windsor; 83 Aaron Woods; Tight ends: 41 Kai Brown; 84 Nate Lawrie; 82 Darrell Strong	Offensive linemen: 66 Martin Bibla G; 67 Matt Lentz T/G; 75 Sam Lightbody T; 77 Tyler Luellen T; 65 Mike Mabry C; 62 Erik Robertson G/C; 60 Matt Spanos G; 63 Mike Tepper T; Defensive linemen: 98 Antwon Burton DT; 93 John Faletoese DT; 93 Josh Leonard DE; 94 Eric Moncur DE; 90 Jason Parker DE; 97 Josh Savage DE; 91 A. J. Schable DE/DT; 99 Jason Stewart DT	Linebackers: 55 Maurice Crum, Jr. OLB; 52 Prince Kwateng MLB; 57 Zeke Moreno MLB; 54 Ronnie Palmer OLB; 53 Clinton Snyder OLB; 51 Mike Tauiliili OLB; 56 Dontarrious Thomas OLB; Defensive backs: 30 Tim Clark CB; 31 Lendy Holmes SS; 27 David Irons CB; 22 Dennis Keyes FS; 24 Kelly Malveaux CB; 25 Terrell Maze CB; 32 Marcus McCauley CB; 21 Ronnie Prude CB; 34 Andrew Sendejo SS	Special teams: 42 Aaron King LS; 1 Tom Malone P; 9 Fabrizio Scaccia K; Reserve lists: 31 Robert Bourne CB (IR); -- Kevin Myers T (IR); 29 Scott Ware FS (IR); 50 Worrell Williams MLB (IR); rookies in italics 52 Active, 4 Inactive

== Schedule ==
Week	Date	Opponent	Result	Record	Venue	Attendance
1	September 18	at Hartford Colonials	L 10–27	0–1	Rentschler Field	14,384
2	September 25	Florida Tuskers	W 24–20	1–1	Hornet Stadium	20,000
3	October 2	at Omaha Nighthawks	L 17–20	1–2	Rosenblatt Stadium	23,416
4	Bye					
5	October 15	Las Vegas Locomotives	L 3–26	1–3	Hornet Stadium	19,000
6	October 21	at Florida Tuskers	W 21–17	2–3	Citrus Bowl	10,066
7	October 30	Hartford Colonials	L 26–27	2–4	Hornet Stadium	13,500
8	November 6	at Las Vegas Locomotives	W 27–24	3–4	Sam Boyd Stadium	13,622
9	November 13	Omaha Nighthawks	W 41–3	4–4	Hornet Stadium	20,000
10	Bye					

== Standings ==
United Football League
	W	L	T	PCT	PF	PA	STK
y-Las Vegas Locomotives	5	3	0	.625	174	142	L2
y-Florida Tuskers	5	3	0	.625	213	136	W3
Sacramento Mountain Lions	4	4	0	.500	169	164	W2
Hartford Colonials	3	5	0	.375	169	194	W1
Omaha Nighthawks	3	5	0	.375	113	202	L4

y-denotes team has clinched a 2010 UFL championship game berth

== Game summaries ==
=== Week 1: at Hartford Colonials ===
Quarter	1	2	3	4	Total
Mountain Lions	0	0	3	7	10
Colonials	7	13	7	0	27

at Rentschler Field, East Hartford, Connecticut

- Date: Saturday, September 18
- Game time: 11:30 a.m. PT
- Game attendance: 14,384
- Referee: Perry Havener
- TV announcers (NESN): Mike Logan (play-by-play) and Scott Zolak (analyst)
- Recap

Game information

1st Quarter

- HAR – Markee White 4-yard pass from Josh McCown (Taylor Mehlhaff kick), 9:22

2nd Quarter

- HAR – Taylor Mehlhaff 34-yard field goal, 11:33
- HAR – Jason Chery 59-yard pass from Josh McCown (Taylor Mehlhaff kick), 8:34
- HAR – Taylor Mehlhaff 20-yard field goal, 5:00

3rd Quarter

- HAR – Lorenzo Booker 80-yard pass from Josh McCown (Taylor Mehlhaff kick), 14:03
- SAC – Fabrizio Scaccia 21-yard field goal, 6:45

4th Quarter

- SAC – Joe West 5-yard pass from Daunte Culpepper (Fabrizio Scaccia kick), 7:37

Passing

- SAC – Daunte Culpepper – 21/40, 174 yards, 1 TD, 1 INT
- HAR – Josh McCown – 11/21, 265 yards, 3 TD

Rushing

- SAC – Cory Ross – 14 att, 22 yards
- HAR – Andre Dixon – 21 att, 94 yards

Receiving

- SAC – Rod Windsor – 5 rec, 55 yards
- HAR – Jason Chery – 2 rec, 103 yards, 1 TD

=== Week 2: vs. Florida Tuskers ===
Quarter	1	2	3	4	Total
Tuskers	3	7	7	3	20
Mountain Lions	0	7	0	17	24

at Hornet Stadium, Sacramento, California

- Date: Saturday, September 25
- Game time: 8:00 p.m. PT
- TV announcers (Versus): Craig Minervini (play-by-play) and Doug Flutie (analyst)

Over 20,000 Sacramento fans filed into Hornet Stadium to watch the Mountain Lions overcome a ten-point fourth-quarter deficit to become the first team to beat the Florida Tuskers in the regular season (snapping a seven-game win streak for Florida), 24–20. Daunte Culpepper completed 26 of 42 passes for 374 yards, three touchdowns, and an interception. This included the 33-yard go-ahead touchdown pass with thirty-one seconds left to play. Brooks Bollinger threw for his sixth career 300-yard game in the UFL with 328, completing 23 of 41 yards for a touchdown and an interception. The win gave the Mountain Lions (1–1) their first win since relocating to Sacramento and the loss gave Florida (1–1) their first ever even .500 record.

=== Week 7: vs. Hartford Colonials ===
Quarter	1	2	3	4	Total
Colonials	7	7	0	13	27
Mountain Lions	14	6	0	6	26

at Hornet Stadium, Sacramento, California

- Date: Saturday, October 30
- Game time: 8:00 p.m. PT
- Game attendance: 13,500
- Referee: Jon Bible
- TV announcers (Versus): Craig Minervini (play-by-play) and Doug Flutie (analyst)
- Recap

The thirty-four combined points at halftime was the most scored in the first thirty minutes in a game this season, and the Colonials also gave up the league's first ever punt return for a touchdown. But Hartford overcame an early 14-0 deficit to defeat the Sacramento Mountain Lions, 27-26 in front of a crowd of over 13,000 at Hornet Stadium. After missing a potential game-winning field goal against Las Vegas the previous week, plus 34 and 22-yard field goals earlier in the game, Taylor Mehlhaff redeemed himself by nailing a 23-yarder as time expired to beat the Mountain Lions for only their second win of the season. (both coming against Sacramento)

=== Week 8: at Las Vegas Locomotives ===
Quarter	1	2	3	4	Total
Mountain Lions	7	14	0	6	27
Locomotives	0	3	7	14	24

at Sam Boyd Stadium, Whitney, Nevada

- Date: Saturday, November 6
- Game time: 10:00 p.m. PT
- Game attendance: 13,622
- TV: Versus

Sacramento attempted to avenge a 26-3 home loss earlier in the season to Las Vegas and did so with a 27-24 win on the road at Sam Boyd. The Mountain Lions survived a scare after the Locos tied the game at 24 in the fourth quarter, after Sacramento lead 21-0 in the second. Chase Clement was stellar in his debut for the Locos, throwing a touchdown and running for two in Las Vegas's comeback attempt that came up just a bit short. The Mountain Lions are the only team not named Florida to defeat the Locos.
