= 2010 Hartford Colonials season =

- Owner: Bill Mayer
- General manager: Chris Palmer
- Head coach: Chris Palmer
- Home stadium: Rentschler Field

Results
- Record: 3–5
- Division place: 4th
- Playoffs: did not qualify

Uniform

The 2010 Hartford Colonials season was the second season for the Hartford Colonials and the first since relocating to Hartford from New York City. The team finished with a 3–5 record and fourth in the league.

== Offseason ==
=== UFL draft ===
2010 Hartford Colonials UFL draft selections
Draft order		Player name	Position	College
Round	Choice	Player name	Position	College
1	2	Andre Dixon	RB	Connecticut
2	7	Anthony Montgomery	DL	Minnesota
3	12	Shawn Bayes	WR	Kent State
4	17	Andre Barbour	OL	Eastern Kentucky
5	22	Simoni Lawrence	LB	Minnesota
6	27	Tim Mattran	OL	Stanford
7	31	Robert Ortiz	WR	San Diego State
8	40	Asaph Schwapp	FB	Notre Dame
9	44	Brandon Drumgoole	DL	Greensboro College
10	48	Ben Benshoof	OL	Wingate
11	52	Clint McPeek	LB	New Mexico
12	56	Kendall Briscoe	DT	New Mexico

== Staff ==
2010 Hartford Colonials staff
Front office: Owner – Bill Mayer; Director of football operations – Jason McKay; Director of player personnel – David Turner; Head coaches: Head coach/general manager – Chris Palmer; Offensive coaches: Quarterbacks – Dave Ragone; Running backs – Michael Jenkins; Wide receivers – Shane Waldron; Tight ends/offensive line – Oji Fagan; Offensive line – Todd Washington	Defensive coaches: Defensive coordinator – Osia Lewis; Defensive line – Ted Daisher; Assistant defensive line – Tony Sparano Jr.; Linebackers – Frank Hauser; Secondary – Jerry Holmes; Safeties – Doug Mandigo; Special teams coaches: Special teams coordinator – Kevin O'Dea; Special teams quality control/video assistant – James Stanley; Strength and conditioning: Strength and conditioning – Mark Asanovich

== Roster ==
2010 Hartford Colonials final roster
Quarterbacks: 12 Josh McCown; 11 Ryan Perrilloux; Running Backs: 28 Lorenzo Booker; 33 Jason Davis; 26 Andre Dixon; 31 Tory Harrison; 32 Chris Jennings; Wide Receivers: 16 Patrick Carter; 13 Jason Chery; 81 Shaheer McBride; 84 Syndric Steptoe; 17 Aaron Valentin; 88 Markee White; Tight Ends: 87 Charles Davis; 85 Tyson DeVree; 86 Ronnie Ghent	Offensive Linemen: 72 Jacob Bender G; 74 Colin Brown T; 68 Ryan Cave G; 75 Pete Clifford T; 70 Keith Gray C; 77 Greg Isdaner G; 62 Tim Mattran C/G; 79 Isaac Sowells G; 65 Orrin Thompson T; Defensive Linemen: 55 Auston English DE; 98 Marlon Favorite DT; 99 Maurice Fountain DE; 90 Adrian Grady DT; 96 Vince Oghobaase DT; 69 Jonas Seawright DT; 97 Michale Spicer DE; 95 Derek Walker DT	Linebackers: 57 Harry Coleman OLB; 91 Kenny Ingram OLB; 51 Frantz Joseph MLB; 58 Danny Lansanah MLB; 53 Simoni Lawrence OLB; 50 Clint McPeek OLB; 56 Joe Mortensen OLB; Defensive Backs: 27 Tra Battle SS; 24 Emanuel Cook SS; 30 Manny Collins CB; 35 Quintin Demps FS; 20 Ben Hannula FS; 22 Gerard Lawson; 23 Ryan Palmer CB; 36 David Pittman CB; 21 Kyle Whitehurst CB	Special Teams: 6 Jy Bond P; 61 Jared Retkofsky LS; 3 Sam Swank K; Reserve Lists: 52 Tank Daniels OLB (IR); 39 Trevor Ford CB (Susp.); 25 Kevin Jones RB (IR); 68 Rueben Riley G/T (IR); -- Andrew Robinson WR (IR); 44 Asaph Schwapp FB (IR); rookies in italics 52 Active, 6 Inactive

== Schedule ==
Round	Date	Opponent	Result	Record	Venue	Attendance
1	September 18	Sacramento Mountain Lions	W 27–10	1–0	Rentschler Field	14,384
2	September 24	at Omaha Nighthawks	L 26–27	1–1	Rosenblatt Stadium	23,067
3	Bye					
4	October 9	Florida Tuskers	L 20–33	1–2	Rentschler Field	14,468
5	October 16	Omaha Nighthawks	L 14–19	1–3	Rentschler Field	14,056
6	October 23	at Las Vegas Locomotives	L 21–24 (OT)	1–4	Sam Boyd Stadium	8,451
7	October 30	at Sacramento Mountain Lions	W 27–26	2–4	Hornet Stadium	13,500
8	Bye					
9	November 11	at Florida Tuskers	L 7–41	2–5	Citrus Bowl	9,637
10	November 20	Las Vegas Locomotives	W 27–14	3–5	Rentschler Field	14,554

== Standings ==
United Football League
	W	L	T	PCT	PF	PA	STK
y-Las Vegas Locomotives	5	3	0	.625	174	142	L2
y-Florida Tuskers	5	3	0	.625	213	136	W3
Sacramento Mountain Lions	4	4	0	.500	169	164	W2
Hartford Colonials	3	5	0	.375	169	194	W1
Omaha Nighthawks	3	5	0	.375	113	202	L4

y-denotes team has clinched a 2010 UFL championship game berth

== Game summaries ==
=== Week 1: vs. Sacramento Mountain Lions ===
Quarter	1	2	3	4	Total
Mountain Lions	0	0	3	7	10
Colonials	7	13	7	0	27

at Rentschler Field, East Hartford, Connecticut

- Date: Saturday, September 18
- Game time: 2:38 p.m. ET
- Game attendance: 14,384
- Referee: Perry Havener
- TV announcers (NESN): Mike Logan (play-by-play) and Scott Zolak (analyst)
- Recap

Game information

1st Quarter

- HAR – Markee White 4-yard pass from Josh McCown (Taylor Mehlhaff kick), 9:22

2nd Quarter

- HAR – Taylor Mehlhaff 34-yard field goal, 11:33
- HAR – Jason Chery 59-yard pass from Josh McCown (Taylor Mehlhaff kick), 8:34
- HAR – Taylor Mehlhaff 20-yard field goal, 5:00

3rd Quarter

- HAR – Lorenzo Booker 80-yard pass from Josh McCown (Taylor Mehlhaff kick), 14:03
- SAC – Fabrizio Scaccia 21-yard field goal, 6:45

4th Quarter

- SAC – Joe West 5-yard pass from Daunte Culpepper (Fabrizio Scaccia kick), 7:37

Passing

- SAC – Daunte Culpepper – 21/40, 174 yards, 1 TD, 1 INT
- HAR – Josh McCown – 11/21, 265 yards, 3 TD

Rushing

- SAC – Cory Ross – 14 att, 22 yards
- HAR – Andre Dixon – 21 att, 94 yards

Receiving

- SAC – Rod Windsor – 5 rec, 55 yards
- HAR – Jason Chery – 2 rec, 103 yards, 1 TD

The first game in the second season of the UFL was a battle of the two teams that relocated during the offseason, the Sacramento Mountain Lions, formerly the California Redwoods, and the Hartford Colonials, formerly the New York Sentinels. Hartford took scored the first 27 points of the game en route to the franchise's first victory in its two-year history, 27–10. Hartford's QB Josh McCown completed 11 of 21 passes for 265 passes and three touchdowns. Daunte Culpepper of the Mountain Lions threw forty passes, completing twenty-one, threw for 174 yards with a touchdown and an interception. Sacramento lost on opening day for the second consecutive season. A record-crowd of 14,384 attended the first professional football game in Hartford since 1973.

=== Week 2: at Omaha Nighthawks ===
Quarter	1	2	3	4	Total
Colonials	7	13	3	3	26
Nighthawks	7	3	0	17	27

at Johnny Rosenblatt Stadium, Omaha, Nebraska

- Date: Friday, September 24
- Game time: 8:00 p.m. ET
- Game attendance: 23,067
- Referee: Chris Snead
- TV announcers (HDNet): Kenny Rice (play-by-play) and Paul Maguire (analyst)
- Recap

Game information

1st Quarter

- HAR – Tyson DeVree 14-yard pass from Josh McCown (Taylor Mehlhaff kick), 10:00
- OMA – Rendrick Taylor 10-yard pass from Jeff Garcia (Jeff Wolfert kick), 6:54

2nd Quarter

- HAR – Taurus Johnson 6-yard pass from Ryan Perrilloux (Taylor Mehlhaff kick), 10:05
- OMA – Jeff Wolfert 26-yard field goal, 1:13
- HAR – Patrick Carter 35-yard pass from Josh McCown (Taylor Mehlhaff kick failed), 0:13

3rd Quarter

- HAR – Taylor Mehlhaff 37-yard field goal, 5:53

4th Quarter

- OMA – Jeff Wolfert 24-yard field goal, 14:13
- OMA – Devard Darling 2-yard pass from Jeff Garcia (Jeff Wolfert kick), 8:05
- HAR – Taylor Mehlhaff 25-yard field goal, 2:43
- OMA – Robert Ferguson 12-yard pass from Jeff Garcia (Jeff Wolfert kick), 0:12

Passing

- HAR – Josh McCown – 22/25, 264 yards, 2 TD
- OMA – Jeff Garcia – 23/40, 226 yards, 3 TD

Rushing

- HAR – Andre Dixon – 21 att, 59 yards
- OMA – Ahman Green – 12 att, 49 yards

Receiving

- HAR – Lorenzo Booker – 5 rec, 50 yards
- OMA – Devard Darling – 5 rec, 48 yards, 1 TD

=== Week 4: vs. Florida Tuskers ===
Quarter	1	2	3	4	Total
Tuskers	3	7	13	10	33
Colonials	3	10	0	7	20

at Rentschler Field, East Hartford, Connecticut

- Date: Saturday, October 9
- Game time: 3:00 p.m. ET
- Game attendance: 14,468

=== Week 5: vs. Omaha Nighthawks ===
Quarter	1	2	3	4	Total
Nighthawks	0	7	3	9	19
Colonials	7	7	0	0	14

at Rentschler Field, East Hartford, Connecticut

- Date: Saturday, October 16
- Game time: 3:00 p.m. ET
- Game attendance: 14,056

=== Week 6: at Las Vegas Locomotives ===
Quarter	1	2	3	4	OT	Total
Colonials	0	13	0	8	0	21
Locomotives	0	7	7	7	3	24

at Sam Boyd Stadium, Whitney, Nevada

- Date: Saturday, October 23
- Game time: 3:30 p.m. ET
- TV announcers (Versus): Craig Minervini (play-by-play) and Doug Flutie (analyst)

=== Week 7: at Sacramento Mountain Lions ===
Quarter	1	2	3	4	Total
Colonials	7	7	0	13	27
Mountain Lions	14	6	0	6	26

at Hornet Stadium, Sacramento, California

- Date: Saturday, October 30
- Game time: 11:00 p.m. ET
- Game attendance: 13,500
- Referee: Jon Bible
- TV announcers (Versus): Craig Minervini (play-by-play) and Doug Flutie (analyst)
- Recap

=== Week 9: at Florida Tuskers ===
Quarter	1	2	Total
Colonials			0
Tuskers			0

at Citrus Bowl, Orlando, Florida

- Date: Thursday, November 11
- Game time: 7:00 p.m. ET

=== Week 10: vs. Las Vegas Locomotives ===
Quarter	1	2	Total
Locomotives			0
Colonials			0

at Rentschler Field, East Hartford, Connecticut

- Date: Saturday, November 20
- Game time: 3:30 p.m. ET
