= 2010 Omaha Nighthawks season =

- Head coach: Jeff Jagodzinski
- Home stadium: Rosenblatt Stadium

Results
- Record: 3–5
- Division place: 5th
- Playoffs: did not qualify

The 2010 Omaha Nighthawks season was the first season for the United Football League franchise. The team finished with a 3–5 record and last in the league.

== Offseason ==
=== Expansion draft ===
2010 Omaha Nighthawks expansion draft selections
Player name	Position	College	Former team
P. J. Alexander	OG	Syracuse	Florida
Willie Andrews	S	Baylor	Florida
Martin Bibla	OG	Miami (FL)	Las Vegas
Wendell Bryant	DT	Wisconsin	Las Vegas
Mike Fladell	OT	Rutgers	New York Sentinels
Ryan Hoag	WR	Gustavus Adolphus	New York Sentinels
Christian Hopkins	TE	Toledo	New York Sentinels
Ross Kolodziej	DT	Wisconsin	Las Vegas
Fred Matua	OG	Southern California	Florida
Terrell Maze	CB	San Diego State	New York Sentinels
Adrian McCovy	LB	Arizona	California
Frank Murphy	WR	Kansas State	Florida
Ryan Neufeld	TE	UCLA	Florida
Josh Savage	DE	Utah	Florida
Adam Speer	OG	Oregon State	California
Gary Stills	LB	West Virginia	Las Vegas
Craphonso Thorpe	WR	Florida State	New York Sentinels
DeJuan Tribble	CB	Boston College	Florida
Shaud Williams	RB	Alabama	Florida
Willie Williams	DT	Louisville	Florida

=== UFL draft ===
2010 Omaha Nighthawks UFL draft selections
Draft order		Player name	Position	College
Round	Choice	Player name	Position	College
1	1	Dewayne White	DE	Louisville
2	6	Chike Okeafor	DE	Purdue
3	11	Shawn Andrews	OT	Arkansas
4	16	Adrian Jones	OT	Kansas
5	21	Kenny Peterson	DT	Ohio State
6	26	Ronald Curry	WR	North Carolina
7	35	DeMarcus Faggins	CB	Kansas State
8	39	Devard Darling	WR	Washington State
9	43	Nate Webster	LB	Miami (FL)
10	47	Frank Walker	CB	Tuskegee
11	51	Hollis Thomas	DT	Northern Illinois
12	60	Nick Ferguson	S	Georgia Tech

== Staff ==
2010 Omaha Nighthawks staff
Front office: General manager – Rick Mueller; Director of football operations – Matt Boockmeier; Director of player personnel – Ted Sundquist; Head coaches: Head coach/offensive coordinator – Jeff Jagodzinski; Offensive coaches: Quarterbacks – Ron Hudson; Running backs – Wardell Smith; Wide receivers – Roger Hughes; Tight ends – Vince Marrow; Offensive line – Keith Uecker; Offensive quality control/assistant offensive line – Michael Ketchum	Defensive coaches: Defensive coordinator/linebackers/special teams – Kirk Doll; Defensive line – Carl Hairston; Assistant defensive line – Rick Lantz; Defensive backs – Joe Tresey; Defensive quality control/assistant defensive backs – Patrick Madden; Special teams coaches: Assistant special teams/assistant linebackers – Jim Ryan; Strength and conditioning: Strength and conditioning – Andy Williams; Football Video staff: Video director – Joe Riker; Assistant video director/sideline video – Tony Parks; Assistant video director/endzone video – Pat Kelly; Equipment Management: Equipment manager – Cale Kirby; Assistant equipment manager – Alex Moede; Assistant equipment manager – Alex Koskinen

== Roster ==
2010 Omaha Nighthawks final roster
Quarterbacks: 7 Jeff Garcia; 15 Matt Gutierrez; 3 D. J. Shockley; Running Backs: 13 Maurice Clarett; 30 Ahman Green; 36 Rendrick Taylor; 21 Shaud Williams; Wide Receivers: 19 Andrew Brewer; 82 Michael Clayton; 81 Devard Darling; 89 Robert Ferguson; 88 Roy Hall; 85 Mike Hass; Tight Ends: 84 Christian Hopkins; 80 Jeb Putzier; 86 Lee Vickers	Offensive Linemen: 69 P. J. Alexander C; 74 Damion Cook G; 66 Mitch Erickson G; 72 George Foster T; 71 Dan Gay T; 75 Adrian Jones T; 73 Erik Pears T; 61 Marvin Philip C/G; 78 Julius Wilson G/T; Defensive Linemen: 90 Kevin Basped DE; 77 Wendell Bryant DT; 94 Dusty Dvoracek DT; 44 Jay Moore DE; 97 Demetrin Veal DT; 95 Dewayne White DE; 92 Willie Williams DT; 93 Renaldo Wynn DE	Linebackers: 56 Morlon Greenwood MLB; 53 Nick Greisen MLB; 59 Cato June OLB; 50 Joey LaRocque OLB; 52 Alex Lewis OLB; 55 Gary Stills OLB; 54 Pat Thomas OLB; Defensive Backs: 23 Ricardo Colclough CB; 38 DeMarcus Faggins CB; 24 Eric Green CB; 42 Clinton Hart SS; 35 Corey Ivy CB; 37 Calvin Lowry FS; 33 Matt O'Hanlon FS; 32 Jermaine Phillips SS; 20 Stuart Schweigert SS	Special Teams: 16 Justin Brantly P; 47 Matt Overton LS; 6 Jeff Wolfert K; Reserve Lists: 26 Aaron Rouse FS (Susp.); rookies in italics 52 Active, 1 Inactive

== Schedule ==
Round	Date	Opponent	Result	Record	Venue	Attendance
1	Bye					
2	September 24	Hartford Colonials	W 27–26	1–0	Rosenblatt Stadium	23,067
3	October 2	Sacramento Mountain Lions	W 20–17	2–0	Rosenblatt Stadium	23,416
4	October 8	at Las Vegas Locomotives	L 10–22	2–1	Sam Boyd Stadium	9,767
5	October 16	at Hartford Colonials	W 19–14	3–1	Rentschler Field	14,056
6	Bye					
7	October 28	Las Vegas Locomotives	L 10–24	3–2	Rosenblatt Stadium	23,554
8	November 5	at Florida Tuskers	L 14–31	3–3	Citrus Bowl	9,203
9	November 13	at Sacramento Mountain Lions	L 3–41	3–4	Hornet Stadium	20,000
10	November 19	Florida Tuskers	L 10–27	3–5	Rosenblatt Stadium	21,106

== Standings ==
United Football League
	W	L	T	PCT	PF	PA	STK
y-Las Vegas Locomotives	5	3	0	.625	174	142	L2
y-Florida Tuskers	5	3	0	.625	213	136	W3
Sacramento Mountain Lions	4	4	0	.500	169	164	W2
Hartford Colonials	3	5	0	.375	169	194	W1
Omaha Nighthawks	3	5	0	.375	113	202	L4

y-denotes team has clinched a 2010 UFL championship game berth

== Game summaries ==
=== Week 2: vs. Hartford Colonials ===
Quarter	1	2	3	4	Total
Colonials	7	13	3	3	26
Nighthawks	7	3	0	17	27

at Johnny Rosenblatt Stadium, Omaha, Nebraska

- Date: Friday, September 24
- Game time: 7:00 p.m. CT
- Game attendance: 23,067
- Referee: Chris Snead
- TV announcers (HDNet): Kenny Rice (play-by-play) and Paul Maguire (analyst)
- Recap

Game information

1st Quarter

- HAR – Tyson DeVree 14-yard pass from Josh McCown (Taylor Mehlhaff kick), 10:00
- OMA – Rendrick Taylor 10-yard pass from Jeff Garcia (Jeff Wolfert kick), 6:54

2nd Quarter

- HAR – Taurus Johnson 6-yard pass from Ryan Perrilloux (Taylor Mehlhaff kick), 10:05
- OMA – Jeff Wolfert 26-yard field goal, 1:13
- HAR – Patrick Carter 35-yard pass from Josh McCown (Taylor Mehlhaff kick failed), 0:13

3rd Quarter

- HAR – Taylor Mehlhaff 37-yard field goal, 5:53

4th Quarter

- OMA – Jeff Wolfert 24-yard field goal, 14:13
- OMA – Devard Darling 2-yard pass from Jeff Garcia (Jeff Wolfert kick), 8:05
- HAR – Taylor Mehlhaff 25-yard field goal, 2:43
- OMA – Robert Ferguson 12-yard pass from Jeff Garcia (Jeff Wolfert kick), 0:06

Passing

- HAR – Josh McCown – 22/25, 264 yards, 2 TD
- OMA – Jeff Garcia – 23/40, 226 yards, 3 TD

Rushing

- HAR – Andre Dixon – 21 car, 59 yards
- OMA – Ahman Green – 12 car, 49 yards

Receiving

- HAR – Lorenzo Booker – 5 rec, 50 yards
- OMA – Devard Darling – 5 rec, 48 yards, 1 TD

In what is regarded as the best UFL game played so far, Jeff Garcia completed a pass to Robert Ferguson with six seconds left to give the Nighthawks a win 27–26.
