= Willie Williams (defensive tackle) =

American football player (born 1984)

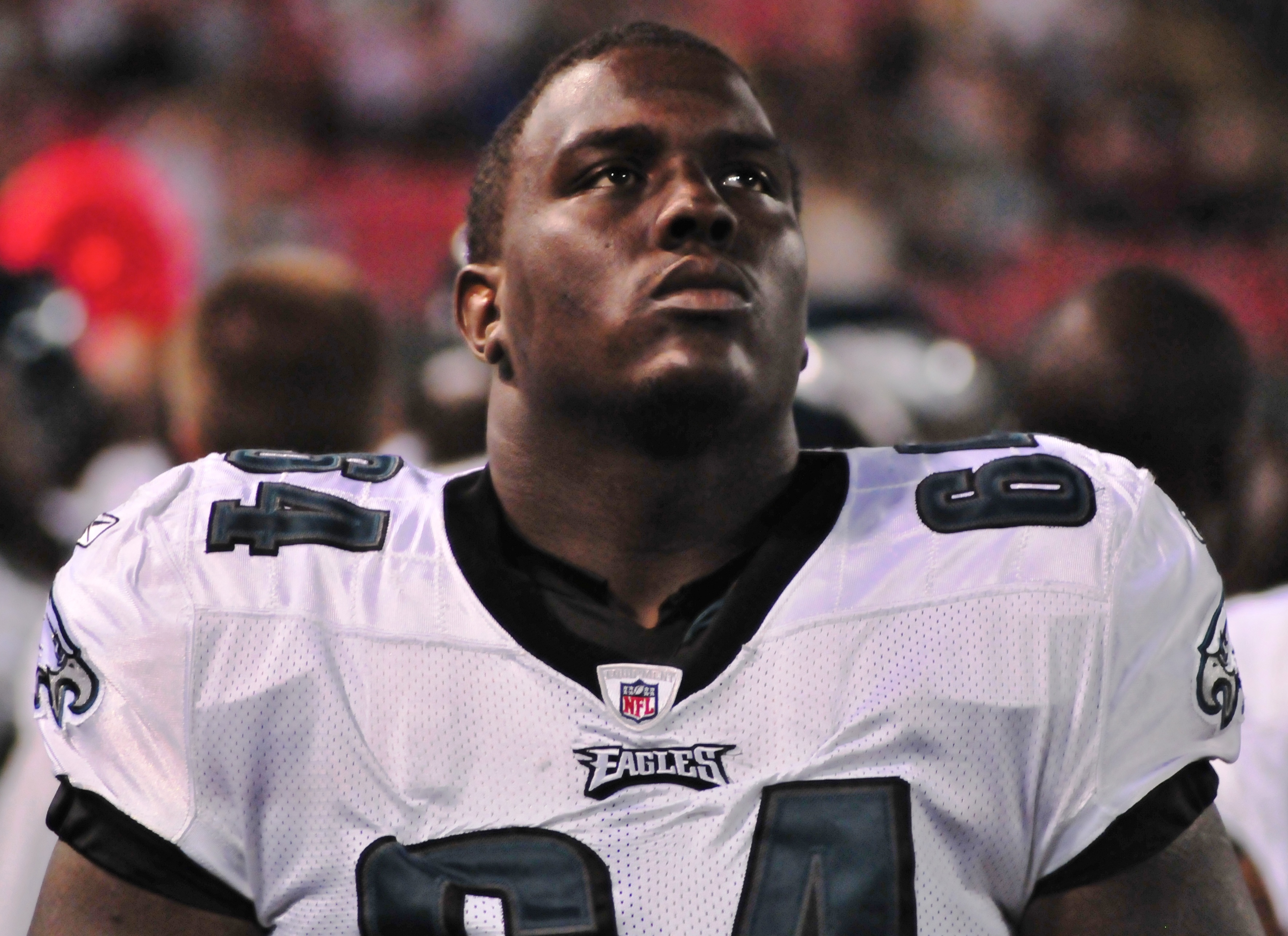
- Williams with the Philadelphia Eagles in 2009

No. 91, 92
- Position: Defensive tackle

Personal information
- Born: September 19, 1984 (age 42); Milledgeville, Georgia, U.S.
- Listed height: 6 ft 4 in (1.93 m)
- Listed weight: 305 lb (138 kg)

Career information
- High school: Thomson (GA)
- College: Louisville
- NFL draft: 2008: undrafted

Career history
- St. Louis Rams (2008–2009); Philadelphia Eagles (2009)*; Florida Tuskers (2009); Omaha Nighthawks (2010); Sacramento Mountain Lions (2011)
- * Offseason or practice squad member only

Willie Williams Jr. (born September 19, 1984) is an American former football defensive tackle. He was signed by the St. Louis Rams as an undrafted free agent in 2008. He played college football at Louisville.

Williams was also a member of the Philadelphia Eagles, Florida Tuskers, Omaha Nighthawks, and Sacramento Mountain Lions.

== Early life ==
Williams played high school football at Thomson High School, in Thomson, Georgia.

== College career ==
Williams played two seasons at Louisville after transferring from Georgia Military College in Milledgeville, Georgia. In 2007, he played in 12 games with eight starts and had 31 tackles with 8 sacks. In 2006, he played in 11 games with one start as a junior and recorded 10 tackles with 3 sacks. Williams also had a stint at Hutchinson Community College in Hutchinson, Kansas.

== Professional career ==
=== St. Louis Rams ===
Williams was signed by the St. Louis Rams as an undrafted free agent. He was waived on July 29, 2009.

=== Philadelphia Eagles ===
Williams was signed by the Philadelphia Eagles on August 1, 2009. He was waived on September 4, 2009.
