= Stevo Klotz =

American football player (born 2001)

Profile
- Position: Tight end

Personal information
- Born: December 28, 2001 (age 24); Chaska, Minnesota, U.S.
- Listed height: 6 ft 4 in (1.93 m)
- Listed weight: 260 lb (118 kg)

Career information
- High school: Chaska (MN)
- College: Iowa State (2020–2024)
- NFL draft: 2025: undrafted

Career history
- Los Angeles Chargers (2025)*
- * Offseason or practice squad member only

Awards and highlights
- 2× Second-team All-Big 12 (2023–2024)

Stevo Klotz (born December 28, 2001) is an American professional football tight end. He played college football for the Iowa State Cyclones.

== Early life ==
Klotz attended Chaska High School in Chaska, Minnesota, and committed to play college football for the Iowa State Cyclones, joining the team as a walk-on.

== College career ==
In his first three seasons in 2020 through 2022, Klotz combined to play in 13 games with one start, while also utilizing a redshirt season. In week 7 of the 2023 season, he hauled in his first career touchdown reception in a 30-10 win over Cincinnati. Klotz finished the 2023 season with seven receptions for 60 yards and a touchdown. In week 12 of the 2024 season, he brought down a 26-yard touchdown reception and rushed 22 yards on a fake punt in a victory versus Cincinnati. During the 2024 season, Klotz finished the season with eight receptions for 89 yards and a touchdown.

== Professional career ==
Pre-draft measurables
Height	Weight	Arm length	Hand span	40-yard dash	10-yard split	20-yard split	20-yard shuttle	Three-cone drill	Vertical jump	Broad jump	Bench press
6 ft 3 7/8 in (1.93 m)	247 lb (112 kg)	32 5/8 in (0.83 m)	9 5/8 in (0.24 m)	4.80 s	1.65 s	2.80 s	4.44 s	7.52 s	34.0 in (0.86 m)	9 ft 3 in (2.82 m)	12 reps
All values from Pro Day

=== Los Angeles Chargers ===
After not being selected during the 2025 NFL draft, Klotz signed with the Los Angeles Chargers as an undrafted free agent. He was waived on August 26, 2025.

=== Orlando Storm ===
On January 14, 2026, Klotz was selected by the Orlando Storm in the 2026 UFL Draft.
