= Tim Mattran =

American football player (born 1984)

No. 62
- Position: Center

Personal information
- Born: October 23, 1984 (age 42); Chanhassen, Minnesota, U.S.
- Listed height: 6 ft 5 in (1.96 m)
- Listed weight: 298 lb (135 kg)

Career information
- High school: Chaska (Chaska, Minnesota)
- College: Stanford
- NFL draft: 2008: undrafted

Career history
- Minnesota Vikings (2008)*; Jacksonville Jaguars (2008)*; St. Louis Rams (2009)*; Oakland Raiders (2009)*; St. Louis Rams (2010)*; Hartford Colonials (2010)
- * Offseason or practice squad member only

Tim Mattran (born October 23, 1984) is an American former football center. He was signed by the Minnesota Vikings as an undrafted free agent in 2008. He played college football at Stanford.

Mattran was also a member of the Jacksonville Jaguars, St. Louis Rams, Oakland Raiders and Hartford Colonials.

== Early life ==
Mattran was raised in Chanhassen, Minnesota and attended Chaska High School in Chaska, Minnesota.

Mattran also participated in the State Science Bowl for two years at Chaska Senior High.

== College career ==
A walk-on at Stanford, Mattran did not play during his first two seasons. During his third year, however, he was used as a reserve and, by 2005, was the starting center. A serious ankle injury prevented him from playing in 2006, but he returned as a starter in 2007 after the NCAA granted him a sixth year of eligibility. He was named to the All-Academic Pac-10 team four times.

== Professional career ==
=== Minnesota Vikings ===
Ranked as the 22nd best center prospect in the draft by Scout Magazine Mattran signed with the Minnesota Vikings as an undrafted free agent following the 2009 NFL draft. He chose Minnesota over the Baltimore Ravens because he wanted the chance to be close to home and also to learn from Pro Bowl center Matt Birk.

Mattran was waived by the Vikings during final cuts on August 30. He was re-signed to the team's practice squad the following day, but released on September 17.

=== Jacksonville Jaguars ===
Mattran was signed to the practice squad of the Jacksonville Jaguars after the team released fullback Chris Brown. He spent the final five weeks of 2008 season as a member of the Jaguars practice squad.

=== St. Louis Rams ===
Mattran was signed by the St. Louis Rams on March 16, 2009.

=== Oakland Raiders ===
Mattran was signed to the Oakland Raiders practice squad on December 18, 2009.

=== Hartford Colonials ===
Mattran was drafted by the Hartford Colonials in the 2010 UFL draft.
