= Dennis Keyes =

American football player (born 1985)

No. 22
- Position: Safety

Personal information
- Born: March 26, 1985 (age 41); Van Nuys, California, U.S.
- Listed height: 6 ft 2 in (1.88 m)
- Listed weight: 199 lb (90 kg)

Career information
- College: UCLA
- NFL draft: 2008: undrafted

Career history
- Arizona Cardinals (2008–2009)*; Sacramento Mountain Lions (2010–2011)
- * Offseason or practice squad member only

Dennis Paul Keyes, II (born March 26, 1985) is an American former football safety for the Sacramento Mountain Lions of the United Football League (UFL), and signed with the Arizona Cardinals as an undrafted free agent in 2008, is a high school football coach and an artist.

== Early life and education ==
Keyes grew up one of six children in San Fernando Valley, California, and attended Lake Balboa Birmingham High, where in 2002 he was the City Section player of the year. He then played college football at UCLA as a starting safety for three years. Keyes graduated from UCLA with a bachelor's degree in history.

== Football career ==
=== UCLA Bruins ===
When he signed in 2003 with the Bruins, Keyes was the No. 14 ranked safety in the nation. During his senior year at UCLA, he was the team's defensive Most Valuable Player, and in 2007 he completed 100-plus tackles in a single season.

=== Arizona Cardinals ===
Keyes was signed by the Arizona Cardinals as an undrafted free agent in 2008. He was waived during final cuts on August 30, but he was re-signed to the practice squad on December 24, 2008. He was signed to a future contract on February 4, 2009. Keyes injured his calf during training camp, was waived/injured on August 18 and subsequently reverted to injured reserve. He was released with an injury settlement on August 25, 2009.

=== High school coaching ===
At Campbell Hall School, Keyes started a new league to teach young players how to play tackle football in a non-contact environment. USAToday reported that Keyes' program, if successful, "will provide a viable alternative to players focusing solely on flag football, particularly as concerns over head trauma continue to rise." At Campbell Hall, he has hired on his staff fellow former UCLA players, including Jarrad Page as defensive coordinator, Marcus Everett as passing game coordinator, Chris Markey as run coordinator, and Kevin Brown as line coach.

== Personal life ==
Keyes lives in Los Angeles with his wife Krystan and their three children. He began sketching charcoal as a child and has returned to school to finish a master’s degree in fine art from the Academy of Art University. The walls of Campbell Hall include some of his sketches.
