= Weston Dacus =

American football player (born 1985)

No. 57
- Position: Linebacker

Personal information
- Born: September 19, 1985 (age 41); Searcy, Arkansas, U.S.
- Listed height: 6 ft 1 in (1.85 m)
- Listed weight: 232 lb (105 kg)

Career information
- College: Arkansas
- NFL draft: 2008: undrafted

Career history
- Kansas City Chiefs (2008–2009); Florida Tuskers (2010); Virginia Destroyers (2011)

Career NFL statistics
- Total tackles: 8
- Stats at Pro Football Reference

Robert Weston Dacus [DAY-cus] (born September 19, 1985) is an American former professional football player who was a linebacker for the Kansas City Chiefs of the National Football League (NFL). He played college football for the Arkansas Razorbacks.

Dacus was a member of Arkansas' 2004 signing class, and went on to play middle linebacker for the Hogs for four seasons. Dacus was a junior starter on the 2006 Arkansas team that won the SEC West division championship, finishing 10–4. His senior season, Arkansas finished 8–5 after losing to Missouri in the 2008 Cotton Bowl. During his career at Arkansas, Dacus was teammates with future NFL players like Darren McFadden, Felix Jones, Peyton Hillis, Damian Williams, Jamaal Anderson, and Mitch Petrus. Dacus was signed by the Kansas City Chiefs as an undrafted free agent in 2008, but was released by the Chiefs in 2009. He played two seasons in the minor league United Football League for the Florida Tuskers, which became the Virginia Destroyers. The league folded in 2012.
