= Arnold Harrison =

American football player (born 1982)

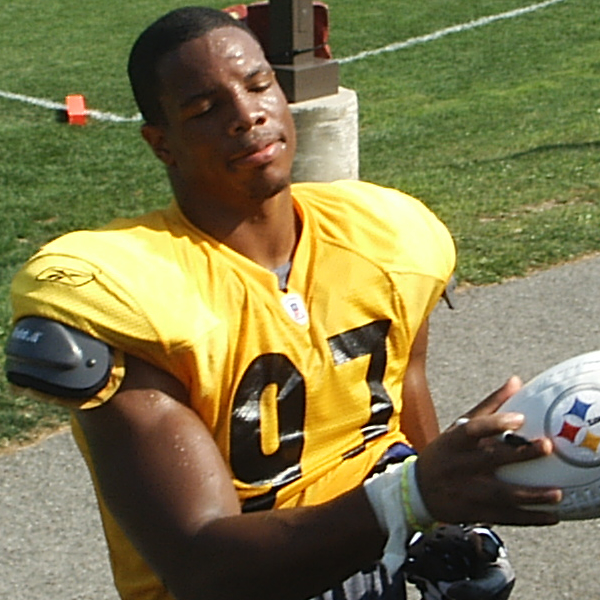
- Harrison signing autographs in 2008

No. 97, 94
- Position: Linebacker

Personal information
- Born: September 20, 1982 (age 44); Augusta, Georgia, U.S.
- Listed height: 6 ft 3 in (1.91 m)
- Listed weight: 241 lb (109 kg)

Career information
- College: Georgia
- NFL draft: 2005: undrafted

Career history
- Pittsburgh Steelers (2005–2009); Cleveland Browns (2009); Florida Tuskers (2010); Virginia Destroyers (2011)

Awards and highlights
- 2× Super Bowl champion (XL, XLIII)

Career NFL statistics
- Total tackles: 41
- Pass deflections: 1
- Stats at Pro Football Reference

Arnold Harrison II (born September 20, 1982) is an American former professional football player who was a linebacker in the National Football League (NFL). He was signed by the Pittsburgh Steelers as an undrafted free agent in 2005. He played college football for the Georgia Bulldogs.

Harrison also played for the Cleveland Browns and Florida Tuskers.

== College career ==
Harrison played college football at the University of Georgia where he majored in economics.

== Professional career ==
=== Pittsburgh Steelers ===
Harrison was signed by the Pittsburgh Steelers as an undrafted free agent in 2005, but did not make any appearances for the team in his rookie season.

In 2006, he played in seven games and finished the season with ten tackles. He appeared in 13 games in 2007 and recorded 13 tackles.

After spending the entire 2008 season on injured reserve with a torn ACL, Harrison was non-tendered as a restricted free agent in the 2009 offseason. However, the Steelers re-signed him to a one-year contract on March 16.

Harrison appeared in eight games and recorded seven tackles for the Steelers in 2009 before being waived on November 17 to make room for linebacker Donovan Woods.

=== Cleveland Browns ===
Harrison was claimed off waivers by the Cleveland Browns on November 18. He appeared in four games and recorded five tackles for the Browns before being waived on December 29 when the team re-signed offensive tackle Scott Kooistra.
