= Chaska High School =

Coordinates: 44.8242289°N 93.5895252°W

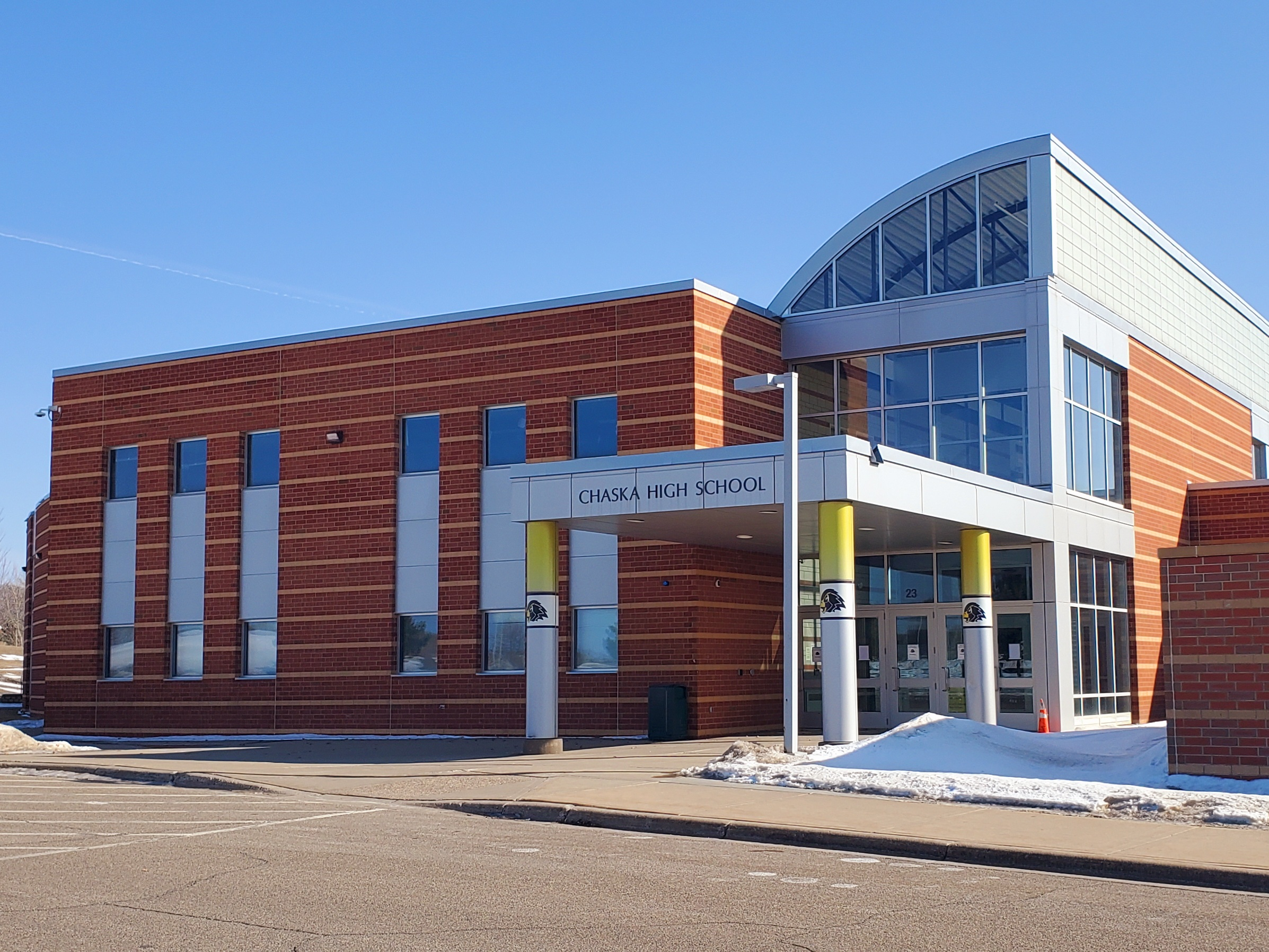

Location
- 545 Pioneer Trail; Chaska, Minnesota, United States

Information
- Type: Public high school
- Motto: Excellence. Tradition. Community. (Academics) Soar Hawks. (Athletics)
- Established: 1905
- School district: Eastern Carver Country Schools (ISD 112)
- Dean: Susana DeLeon, Chuck Nelson
- Principal: Victor Johnson
- Faculty: 180
- Teaching staff: 71.81 (FTE)
- Grades: 9–12
- Enrollment: 1,538 (2023-2024)
- Student to teacher ratio: 21.42
- Colors: Purple, white, gold
- Mascot: Hawk
- Website: chs.district112.org

Chaska Senior High School (CHS) is a public high school located in Chaska, Minnesota, United States, a southwestern suburb of the Minneapolis-St. Paul area. CHS is a 9–12 grade school that is attended by more than 1,500 students.

The school mascot is the "Hawk," with the school colors being purple and gold.

== History ==
Chaska High School first opened in the early 20th-century with its first graduating class in 1906. Since then, Chaska High School has moved to newer facilities three times. Currently, Chaska High School resides at 545 Pioneer Trail. The present facility opened in 1996.

The high school was plagued with a series of racist incidents, starting with media coverage in September 2018 of students who attended a home football game in blackface and an African American-style wig. The issue was echoed in 2019 with another blackface incident in February.

Several black students responded by naming themselves Black History Uncensored and leading a peaceful protest on March 1, 2019 at Chaska High School. They created posters that were presented at a community center event later that month. The protest was against what they and others saw as inequitable censorship of their efforts to share what they viewed as important stories in American history.

Responding to news media coverage of an image circulating on students' social media and posted to a lacrosse channel by Chaska students, Bach and superintendent of schools Clint Christopher admitted they'd known about the images for "about a week," and apologized for not at the meeting being transparent about it with parents. The image featured the faces of 25 black students photoshopped on a map with "Negro Hill" written on it.

== Current facilities ==
Chaska's current facilities feature auditorium, several gymnasiums, a cafeteria, tech-ed labs, computer labs, a media center, a stadium, and several athletic fields. Originally designed for 1,600 students, the school received a substantial addition in 2004.

=== The South Wing ===
This takes up about half the school's area. It consists of the band room, choir room, cafeteria, the auditorium, four gymnasiums, the weight room, locker rooms, workshops, additional classrooms, the activities office, athletic locker rooms, and other athletic-related areas. It is connected through the blue house and the media center. The cafeteria is one story with a high cone glass roof, but the athletic area is two stories.

== Activities ==
=== Music ===
Chaska High School has four choirs, three bands, and many extracurricular groups that offer a wide range of music styles and levels. The choirs are called Cantare, Vivace, Bel Canto, and Concert Choir; the bands are Concert Band, Symphonic Band, and Wind Symphony.

=== Academic teams ===
Chaska High School actively participates in several academic competitions, including Knowledge Bowl, Quiz Bowl, and Science Bowl.

Chaska won the Minnesota State Knowledge Bowl Meet in 1992, 1993, 1995, 1997, 2003, 2009, and 2012. It also won the Minnesota High School Quiz Bowl League in 1992, 1993, 1999, 2000, 2003, 2004, and 2009.

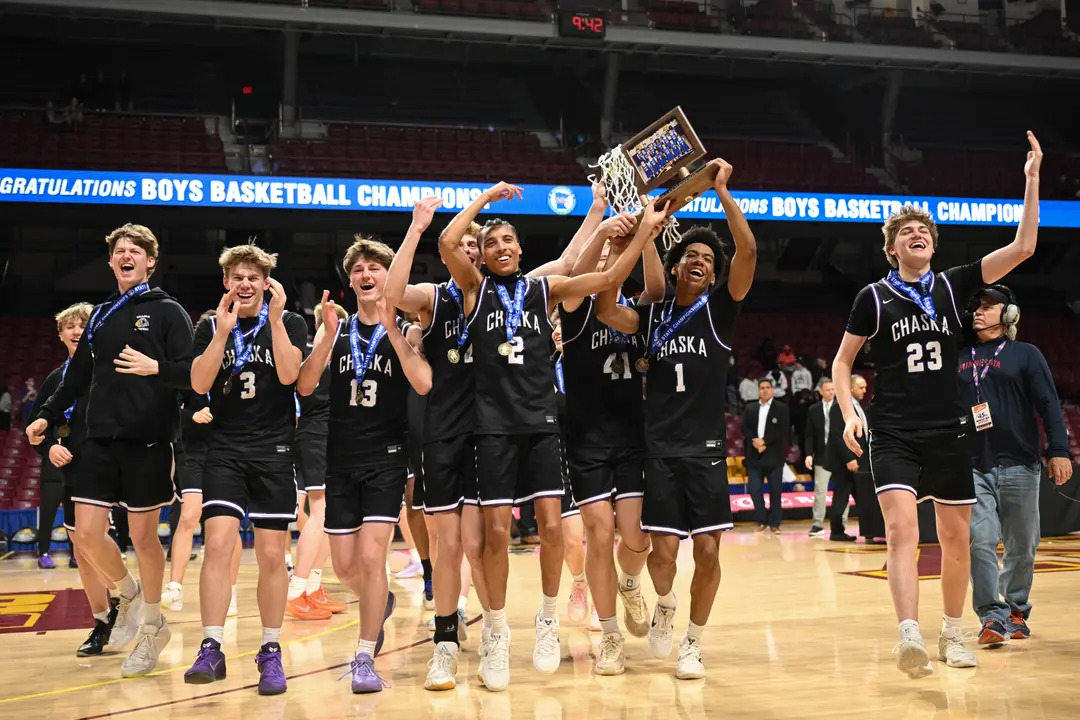
Chaska players celebrate after defeating Apple Valley to win the 2026 Minnesota State Boys Basketball Championship at Williams Arena, in Minneapolis, Minnesota.

=== Sports ===
Chaska High School is part of the Metro West Conference in the Minnesota State High School League.

State Championships
| Season | Sport | Number of Championships | Year |
|---|---|---|---|
| Fall | Football | 1 | 2019 |
| Winter | Volleyball | 7 | 1991, 1993, 1994, 1996, 2005, 2006, 2014 |
| Winter | Dance | 5 | 1999 (high kick), 2012 (jazz), 2012 (high kick), 2013 (jazz), 2013 (high kick) |
| Winter | Basketball, Boys | 2 | 2004, 2026 |
| Winter | Basketball, Girls | 1 | 2021 |
| Spring | Golf, Girls | 1 | 1979 |
| Winter | Speech | 1 | 2023 (Great Speeches) |
| Total | | 15 | |

== Notable alumni ==
- Andy Bisek, American Greco-Roman wrestler, competed at the 2016 Summer Olympics
- Tony Denman, actor (Fargo)
- Brad Gulden, retired MLB player
- Brad Hand, Major League Baseball pitcher (Florida/Miami Marlins, San Diego Padres)
- Mike Lindell, founder of My Pillow
- Tim Mattran, football player (St. Louis Rams)
- Erik Paulsen, United States Representative, businessman
- Sam Rinzel, hockey player and Chicago Black Hawks draftee
- Jimmy Snuggerud, hockey player and St. Louis Blues draftee
- Scott Wolter, geologist and host of H2 television show America Unearthed
- Stevo Klotz, Football player (Iowa State and Los Angeles Chargers)
- Ross Travis, Football player ( Indianapolis Colts and Kansas City Chiefs)
