= Jeff Jagodzinski =

American football player and coach (born 1963)

Louisville Kings
- Title: Tight ends coach

Personal information
- Born: October 12, 1963 (age 63); Milwaukee, Wisconsin, U.S.

Career information
- College: Wisconsin–Whitewater (1981–1984)
- NFL draft: 1985: undrafted

Career history
- Wisconsin–Whitewater (1985) Running backs coach; Northern Illinois (1986) Offensive line coach; LSU (1987–1988) Graduate assistant; East Carolina (1989–1991) Tight ends coach & assistant offensive line coach; East Carolina (1992–1996) Offensive line coach; Boston College (1997–1998) Offensive coordinator & offensive line coach; Green Bay Packers (1999–2003) Tight ends coach; Atlanta Falcons (2004) Tight ends coach; Atlanta Falcons (2005) Offensive line coach; Green Bay Packers (2006) Offensive coordinator; Boston College (2007–2008) Head coach; Tampa Bay Buccaneers (2009) Offensive coordinator; Omaha Nighthawks (2010) Head coach; Ave Maria (2012) Wide receivers coach; Georgia State (2013–2015) Offensive coordinator; Georgia State (2016) Associate head coach; Notre Dame HS (TN) (2017–2019) Offensive coordinator; Dallas Renegades (2020) Offensive coordinator & offensive line coach; Panthers Wrocław (2021) Offensive line coach; Philadelphia Stars (2022–2023) Offensive line coach; Louisville Kings (2026–present) Tight ends coach

Awards and highlights
- UFL champion (2026); 2× ACC Atlantic Division (2007, 2008)

Head coaching record
- Regular season: 23–13 (.639)
- Postseason: 1–1 (.500)
- Career: 24–14 (.632)

Jeff Jagodzinski (born October 12, 1963) is an American football coach and former player who is currently the Tight ends coach for the Louisville Kings of the United Football League (UFL). He was previously the offensive coordinator at Georgia State University. Jagodzinski served as head football coach at Boston College in 2007 and 2008, leading the Eagles to a record of 20–8 and consecutive appearances in the ACC Championship Game. In 2010, he was the head coach of the United Football League's Omaha Nighthawks.

== Playing career and family ==
A graduate of the University of Wisconsin–Whitewater, Jagodzinski played college football there, starting three years at fullback. He was all-conference at West Allis Central High School in Wisconsin.

== Coaching career ==
=== Early coaching experience ===
Jagodzinski began his coaching career as the running back coach for the University of Wisconsin–Whitewater in 1985. He was the offensive line coach for Northern Illinois University in 1986. He held a Graduate Assistant position with LSU from 1987 through 1988. In 1989, he became the tight ends/assistant offensive line coach for East Carolina University and remained in that position until 1996. In 1997 and 1998 he served as the offensive coordinator/offensive line coach at Boston College.

=== NFL experience ===
Jagodzinski made the transition to the National Football League (NFL) in 1999, becoming the tight ends coach for the Green Bay Packers under head coach Ray Rhodes. Rhodes and most of his staff were fired after that season, but new head coach Mike Sherman kept Jagodzinski until 2003 when he was released. He was quickly picked up by the Atlanta Falcons to be the offensive line coach.

Jagodzinski was hired by Green Bay Packers head coach Mike McCarthy on January 15, 2006, to replace offensive coordinator Tom Rossley. He was the fifth individual to hold the title of Packers offensive coordinator. Jagodzinski joined Paul Roach (1975–76), Lindy Infante (1988–91), Sherman Lewis (1992–99), and Tom Rossley (2000–05). Bob Schnelker (1969–71), John Polonchek (1972–74), Lew Carpenter (1975–79), and Tom Coughlin (1986–87) served as passing game coordinators on staffs that didn't necessarily carry an offensive coordinator.

During his time with the Atlanta Falcons, Jagodzinski learned offensive zone blocking schemes from Alex Gibbs, the architect of successful NFL offensive lines such as the Denver Broncos that won Super Bowl XXXII.

=== Boston College ===
Jagodzinski was named head coach at Boston College in January 2007 to replace Tom O'Brien. He inherited a talent laden BC team, which he led to an 11–3 record, a #10 finish in the polls and an ACC Atlantic Division Championship. At one point in the season, the Eagles were ranked second in the Bowl Championship Series standings. Along with Steve Logan, Jagodzinski brought a high flying offensive attack which was very different from Tom O'Brien's short passing game style. He has been nicknamed "Jags" by BC fans and the media. After his first season at BC, Tom O'Brien protegees Matt Ryan and Gosder Cherilus were selected in the first round of the NFL draft. In the 2008 season BC's record dropped to 9–5, including a loss at the Music City Bowl.

Following the 2008 season, Jagodzinski interviewed for the vacant New York Jets head coaching job, despite being warned not to do so by athletic director Gene DeFilippo. He interviewed for the position, and was fired the next day. He only completed two years of his five-year contract with Boston College. The Jets ultimately hired Rex Ryan, who was previously the defensive coordinator and assistant head coach for the Baltimore Ravens.

=== Tampa Bay ===
Jagodzinski was hired as the offensive coordinator of the Tampa Bay Buccaneers on January 29, 2009, following the promotion of Raheem Morris, who had been elevated to head coach following Jon Gruden's departure. On September 3, 2009, the day before the team's final preseason game, the Buccaneers announced that they had dismissed Jagodzinski from his role and replaced him with quarterbacks coach Greg Olson. The firing came due to concerns about Jagodzinski's ability to communicate plays in a timely manner. He had been asked by the head coach to provide details to the team's offensive play calling, however he was unable to provide familiarity with the Tampa Bay playbook, (deferring to a subordinate to answer questions), thus exposing his over reliance on subordinates. Morris offered to let him stay on as quarterbacks coach, but Jagodzinski declined.

=== Omaha Nighthawks ===
On April 15, 2010, when the United Football League announced the franchise which would be known as the Omaha Nighthawks, Jagodzinski was introduced as the team's first head coach. He was fired January 3, 2011, after posting a 3–5 record in his lone campaign with the team. The Nighthawks started 3–1, yet finished 0–4 in the final weeks of the 2010 UFL season. He was replaced by Joe Moglia.

=== Return to college coaching ===
After serving a season as wide receiver coach at Ave Maria University, he took the position of offensive coordinator at Georgia State University under Trent Miles.

=== XFL ===
On May 25, 2019, Bob Stoops hired Jagodzinski to be the offensive line coach for the Dallas Renegades.

On March 9, 2020, Jagodzinski was promoted to offensive coordinator after previous OC Hal Mumme suffered an injury in a collision with a player and accepted an advisor role with the team.

=== Kentucky ===
On November 15, 2020, Jagodzinski was hired to coach Kentucky's offensive line for the remainder of the 2020 season after previous offensive line coach John Schlarman died.

== Head coaching record ==
=== College ===
Year	Team	Overall	Conference	Standing	Bowl/playoffs	Coaches^{#}	AP^{°}
Boston College Eagles (Atlantic Coast Conference) (2007–2008)
2007	Boston College	11–3	6–2	1st (Atlantic)	W Champs Sports	11	10
2008	Boston College	9–5	5–3	1st (Atlantic)	L Music City		
Boston College:		20–8	11–5				
Total:		20–8					
National championship Conference title Conference division title or championship game berth
^{#}Rankings from final Coaches Poll.; ^{°}Rankings from final AP Poll.

=== United Football League ===
Team	Year	Regular season					Postseason			
Team	Year	Won	Lost	Ties	Win %	Finish	Won	Lost	Win %	Result
OMA	2010	3	5	0	.375	5th in League	–	–	–	–
OMA total		3	5	0	.375		–	–	–	
Total		3	5	0	.375		–	–	–	
