= Kevin Hobbs =

American football player (born 1983)

No. 32, 23
- Position: Cornerback

Personal information
- Born: November 8, 1986 (age 39); Tampa, Florida, U.S.
- Listed height: 6 ft 0 in (1.83 m)
- Listed weight: 188 lb (85 kg)

Career information
- High school: Tampa Bay Technical
- College: Auburn
- NFL draft: 2006: undrafted

Career history
- Seattle Seahawks (2006)*; Atlanta Falcons (2006–2007)*; Seattle Seahawks (2007–2008); Detroit Lions (2009); Miami Dolphins (2010)*; Las Vegas Locomotives (2010)
- * Offseason or practice squad member only

Awards and highlights
- UFL champion (2010)

Career NFL statistics
- Total tackles: 50
- Forced fumbles: 2
- Pass deflections: 2
- Stats at Pro Football Reference

Kevin Hobbs (born April 30, 1983) is an American former professional football player who was a cornerback in the National Football League (NFL). He played college football for the Auburn Tigers and was signed by the Seattle Seahawks as an undrafted free agent in 2006.

Hobbs also played for the Atlanta Falcons, Detroit Lions and Miami Dolphins.

== Early life ==
Hobbs played high school football at Tampa Bay Tech in Tampa, Florida. He was a two-year starter on varsity - he had a team high in interceptions as a junior and senior. Hobbs was a two-time All Western Conference selection at cornerback. As a senior, he participated in the Hillsborough County All Star Game and was selected as a National Football Foundation Scholar-Athlete. He was a member of the senior class that won the school's first ever District Championship in 2000.

== Professional career ==
=== Seattle Seahawks ===
Hobbs was undrafted in the National Football League after graduating from Auburn University. He started his second professional season on the Seattle Seahawks practice squad, but was signed to the active roster as the team's 5th cornerback on October 2, 2007.

On November 12, 2007, the Seahawks released him. He was re-signed to the practice squad, but later promoted to the full roster again after safety C. J. Wallace was placed on injured reserve.

Hobbs was waived on September 5, 2009.

=== Detroit Lions ===
On September 6, 2009, Hobbs was claimed off waivers by the Detroit Lions. He was released on April 16, 2010.

=== Miami Dolphins ===
Hobbs signed with the Miami Dolphins on August 12, 2010. He was released on September 4, 2010.
