= Lewis Baker (gridiron football) =

American gridiron football player (born 1984)

No. 43
- Position: Safety

Personal information
- Born: October 12, 1984 (age 42); Carrollton, Texas, U.S.
- Listed height: 6 ft 2 in (1.88 m)
- Listed weight: 202 lb (92 kg)

Career information
- High school: Hebron (Carrollton, Texas)
- College: Oklahoma
- NFL draft: 2008: undrafted

Career history
- San Francisco 49ers (2008–2009)*; Hamilton Tiger-Cats (2009)*; Las Vegas Locomotives (2010–2011)
- * Offseason or practice squad member only

Awards and highlights
- UFL champion (2010)

Lewis Baker (born October 12, 1984) is a former gridiron football safety who played for the Las Vegas Locomotives of the United Football League (UFL). He played college football for Oklahoma and was signed as an undrafted free agent in 2008 by the San Francisco 49ers. He also was a member of the Hamilton Tiger-Cats of the Canadian Football League (CFL).

== Professional career ==
=== San Francisco 49ers ===
After going unselected in the 2008 NFL draft, Baker was signed by the San Francisco 49ers as an undrafted free agent. He was released prior to the start of the regular season. Baker was re-signed by the team in March 2009, only to be released on July 24.

=== Hamilton Tiger-Cats ===
Baker was signed by the Hamilton Tiger-Cats of the Canadian Football League (CFL) on October 8, 2009. He spent the season on the practice roster, and did not make any appearances. He was released in early 2010.

=== Las Vegas Locomotives ===
After being released by the Tiger-Cats, Baker was signed by the Las Vegas Locomotives in the United Football League (UFL). He appeared in six games during the 2010 season, and was a member of their league championship team. He played appeared in four games the following season before being released, ending his professional career.
