= Eric Moncur =

American football player (born 1984)

No. 61, 94
- Position: Defensive end

Personal information
- Born: November 28, 1984 (age 41); Miami, Florida, U.S.
- Listed height: 6 ft 2 in (1.88 m)
- Listed weight: 249 lb (113 kg)

Career information
- High school: Miami Carol City (FL)
- College: Miami (Fla.)
- NFL draft: 2010: undrafted

Career history
- Philadelphia Eagles (2010)*; Sacramento Mountain Lions (2010)
- * Offseason or practice squad member only

Awards and highlights
- The Sporting News freshman All-ACC honors (2005)

Eric Moncur (born November 28, 1984) is an American former football defensive end. He was signed by the Philadelphia Eagles as an undrafted free agent in 2010. He played college football at Miami (Fla.). He is now a highschool football coach for Mater Academy charter highschool in Hialeah Florida.

Moncur also played for the Sacramento Mountain Lions.

== Early life ==
Moncur attended Miami Carol City High School in Miami Gardens, Florida.

== College career ==
Moncur played college football at the University of Miami. He earned The Sporting News freshman All-ACC honors in 2005.

== Professional career ==
=== Philadelphia Eagles ===
Moncur was signed by the Philadelphia Eagles as an undrafted free agent following the 2010 NFL draft on April 27, 2010. He was waived on August 2. He was re-signed on August 16. He was waived during final cuts on September 4.
