= Alfred Malone =

American football player (born 1982)

No. 97, 98
- Position: Defensive tackle

Personal information
- Born: February 21, 1982 (age 44); Frisco City, Alabama, U.S.
- Listed height: 6 ft 4 in (1.93 m)
- Listed weight: 312 lb (142 kg)

Career information
- College: Troy
- NFL draft: 2005: undrafted

Career history
- Houston Texans (2005–2006); Green Bay Packers (2007–2008); Las Vegas Locomotives (2010–2011)

Awards and highlights
- UFL champion (2010)

Career NFL statistics
- Total tackles: 16
- Sacks: 1.5
- Pass deflections: 2
- Stats at Pro Football Reference

Alfred Wayne Malone (born February 21, 1982) is an American former professional football player who was a defensive tackle in the National Football League (NFL). He played college football for the Troy Trojans and was signed by the Houston Texans as an undrafted free agent in 2005.

Malone also played for the Green Bay Packers and Las Vegas Locomotives.

== Early life ==
Malone attended Frisco City High School where he played defensive end and tight end.

== College career ==
Malone started his college career at Georgia Tech before transferring to Troy University. During his college time he recorded 50 sacks.
