= Christian Hopkins =

American football player (born 1985)

No. 48, 84
- Position: Tight end

Personal information
- Born: February 26, 1985 (age 41)
- Listed height: 6 ft 5 in (1.96 m)
- Listed weight: 255 lb (116 kg)

Career information
- High school: Chicago (IL) Hyde Park
- College: Toledo
- NFL draft: 2008: undrafted

Awards and highlights
- Super Bowl champion (XLVI)

Christian "Chris" James Hopkins (born February 26, 1985) is an American former football tight end. He played college football at the university of Toledo and high school football at Hyde Park High School in Chicago. He was signed by the New York Giants as an undrafted free agent on July 30, 2011. Hopkins earned a Super Bowl ring as a member of the Giants team who topped the New England Patriots by a score of 21–17 in Super Bowl XLVI on February 5, 2012.
