= Calvin Russell (American football) =

American football player (born 1983)

No. 88
- Position: Wide receiver

Personal information
- Born: June 14, 1983 (age 43); Fairburn, Georgia, U.S.
- Listed height: 6 ft 0 in (1.83 m)
- Listed weight: 190 lb (86 kg)

Career information
- College: Tuskegee
- NFL draft: 2006: undrafted

Career history
- Green Bay Packers (2006–2007)*; Columbus Destroyers (2008); Florida Tuskers (2010); Cincinnati Bengals (2011)*; Virginia Destroyers (2011–2012)
- * Offseason or practice squad member only

Awards and highlights
- UFL champion (2011)
- Stats at Pro Football Reference

Calvin Leon Russell (born June 14, 1983) is an American former football wide receiver. He was signed by the Green Bay Packers as an undrafted free agent in 2008. He played college football at Tuskegee.

Russell was also a member of the Columbus Destroyers, Florida Tuskers, Cincinnati Bengals and Virginia Destroyers.
