= Darrell Strong =

American football player (born 1986)

No. 82
- Position: Tight end

Personal information
- Born: May 21, 1986 (age 40); Fort Lauderdale, Florida, U.S.
- Listed height: 6 ft 5 in (1.96 m)
- Listed weight: 265 lb (120 kg)

Career information
- High school: Plantation (Plantation, Florida)
- College: Pittsburgh
- NFL draft: 2008: undrafted

Career history
- Oakland Raiders (2008); Sacramento Mountain Lions (2010)

Career NFL statistics
- Games played: 1
- Stats at Pro Football Reference

Darrell Strong (born May 21, 1986) is an American former professional football player who was a tight end for the Oakland Raiders of the National Football League (NFL). He played college football for the Pittsburgh Panthers and was signed by the Raiders as an undrafted free agent in 2008.

== Early life ==
Darrel Strong was born in Ft. Lauderdale, Florida, and played for Plantation High School.

== College career ==
Strong played college football at the University of Pittsburgh for the Panthers in Pittsburgh, Pennsylvania. During his tenure at the Pittsburgh program he played the tight end position.

== Professional career ==
Strong was signed as an undrafted free agent by the Oakland Raiders in 2008. He played one game for the team. He was signed to the Sacramento Mountain Lions of the United Football League, this being where he recorded his only professional football touchdown.
