= Daunte Culpepper =

American football player (born 1977)

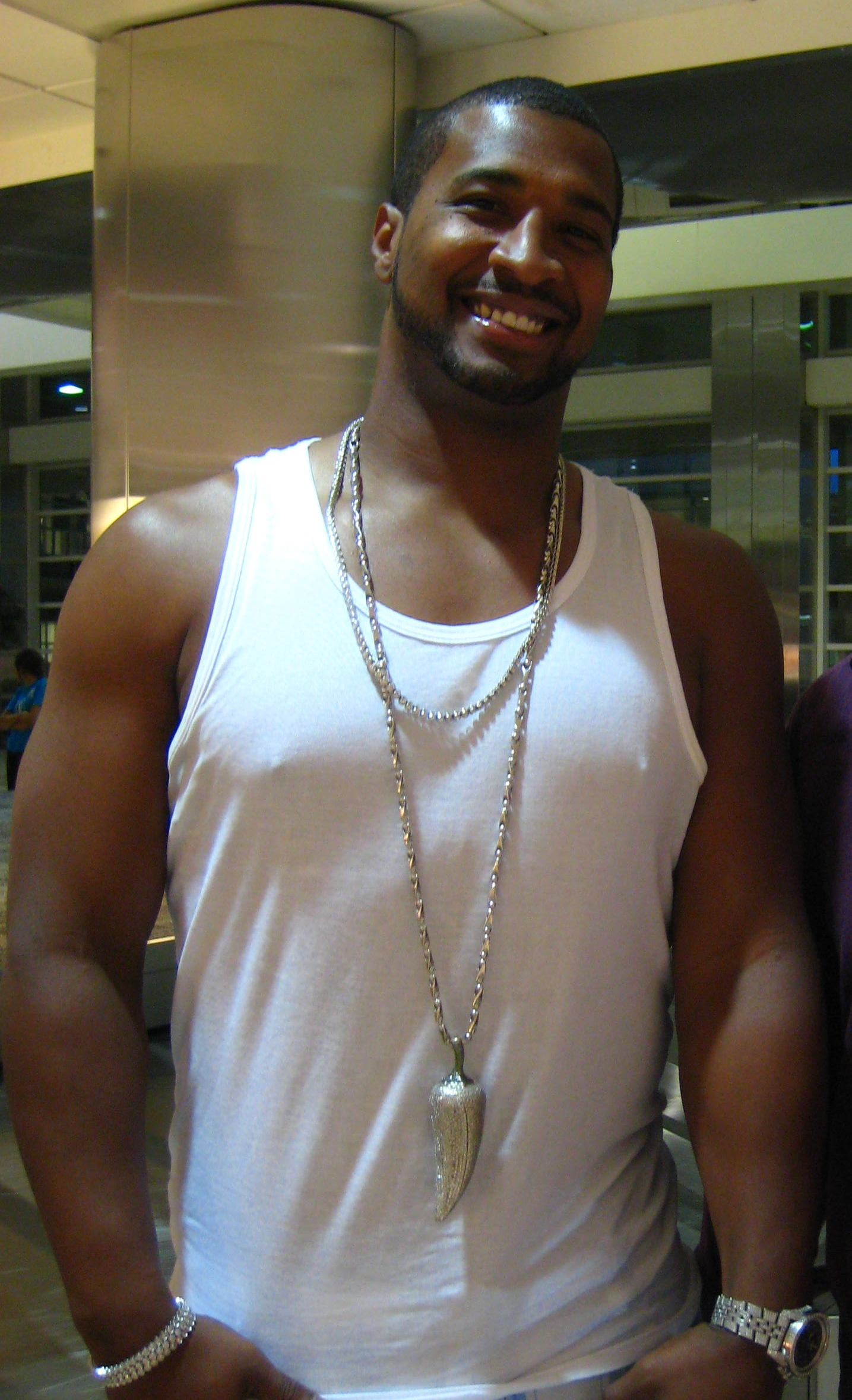
- Culpepper in 2009

No. 12, 11, 8
- Position: Quarterback

Personal information
- Born: January 28, 1977 (age 49); Ocala, Florida, U.S.
- Listed height: 6 ft 4 in (1.93 m)
- Listed weight: 260 lb (118 kg)

Career information
- High school: Vanguard (Ocala)
- College: UCF (1995–1998)
- NFL draft: 1999: 1st round, 11th overall pick

Career history
- Minnesota Vikings (1999–2005); Miami Dolphins (2006); Oakland Raiders (2007); Detroit Lions (2008–2009); Sacramento Mountain Lions (2010)

Awards and highlights
- 3× Pro Bowl (2000, 2003, 2004); NFL passing yards leader (2004); NFL passing touchdowns leader (2000); 50 Greatest Vikings; Minnesota Vikings All-Mall of America Field Team; Sammy Baugh Trophy (1998); NCAA completion percentage leader (1998); UCF Knights No. 8 honored

Career NFL statistics
- Passing attempts: 3,199
- Passing completions: 2,016
- Completion percentage: 63.0%
- Passing yards: 24,153
- TD–INT: 149–106
- Passer rating: 87.8
- Rushing yards: 2,652
- Rushing touchdowns: 34
- Stats at Pro Football Reference

Daunte Rachard Culpepper (born January 28, 1977) is an American former professional football quarterback who played in the National Football League (NFL) for 11 seasons, primarily with the Minnesota Vikings. He played college football for the UCF Knights, winning the Sammy Baugh Trophy in 1998 after leading the NCAA in completion percentage. Culpepper was selected by the Vikings in the first round of the 1999 NFL draft.

During his seven seasons with the Vikings, Culpepper led the team to two playoff runs, one division title, and an NFC Championship Game appearance, along with earning three Pro Bowl selections. He also set the single season record for the most total yardage produced by an NFL quarterback in 2004. After suffering a devastating knee injury the following season that ended his Vikings tenure, Culpepper played sparingly for the Miami Dolphins, Oakland Raiders, and Detroit Lions. Culpepper last played professionally for the Sacramento Mountain Lions of the United Football League (UFL).

== Early life ==
Culpepper was born to single mother Barbara Henderson, who is the sister of former NFL linebacker Thomas "Hollywood" Henderson. While his mother was pregnant with him, she was imprisoned for armed robbery. Culpepper was adopted when he was a day old and raised as one of over 15 children of the late Emma Lewis Culpepper, who worked in the correctional facility where his mother was held. They lived in Ocala, Florida, where Culpepper attended Vanguard High School. He played football, coached by Phillip (Phil) Yancey, as well as basketball and baseball. After his senior season in 1994, Culpepper was named Mr. Football in the state of Florida. In 2007, Culpepper was named to the FHSAA's All-Century Team of the top 33 football players in Florida's 100-year history of high school football.

Near the end of his high school team's state basketball championship game, the referee called Culpepper for traveling when he was driving for the game-winning lay-up. Later in his career, Culpepper celebrated football touchdowns by mimicking the motion a basketball referee makes when calling traveling, also known as "the roll".

Culpepper was selected in the 26th round (730th overall) by the New York Yankees in the 1995 Major League Baseball draft, but did not sign and chose to attend college.

== College career ==
Culpepper struggled to get into college, because of low SAT scores. Top football schools such as the University of Miami and University of Florida backed off from recruiting him when it was assumed he would not qualify. As a Division II school, however, the University of Central Florida did not have to abide by the rules of Division I concerning SAT scores. With this, the University of Central Florida offered to tutor and help him achieve the necessary scores, and he qualified. Although big college programs returned to recruit him, as a show of loyalty, Culpepper enrolled at UCF.

Although he had a love for baseball, Culpepper committed to play football at UCF as a quarterback. He rewrote virtually all the school's quarterback records, approximately 30 in all, many held by Darin Slack since 1987. Culpepper also set an NCAA record for single-season completion percentage at 73.6%, breaking a 15-year-old mark set by Steve Young (71.3%). This record stood until Colt McCoy (Texas) finished the 2008 season with a completion percentage of 77.6%. Culpepper accomplished a feat equaled by only two others in NCAA history when he topped the 10,000-yard passing mark and the 1,000-yard rushing mark in his career. He finished his career sixth on the NCAA's all-time total offense list for all divisions with 12,459 yards and was responsible for 108 career touchdowns (84 passing).

After his junior season, Culpepper was being lured out of the collegiate ranks to enter the draft and join the NFL, but instead returned to UCF to play his senior year. UCF posted a 9–2 record, losing only to Purdue and Auburn.

== Professional career ==
=== Pre-draft ===
Pre-draft measurables
Height	Weight	Arm length	Hand span	40-yard dash	10-yard split	20-yard split	20-yard shuttle	Three-cone drill	Vertical jump	Broad jump	Wonderlic
6 ft 3 3/4 in (1.92 m)	255 lb (116 kg)	30 1/4 in (0.77 m)	9 1/2 in (0.24 m)	4.52 s	1.57 s	2.60 s	4.13 s	7.21 s	39 in (0.99 m)	10 ft 2 in (3.10 m)	18
All values from NFL Combine

=== Minnesota Vikings ===
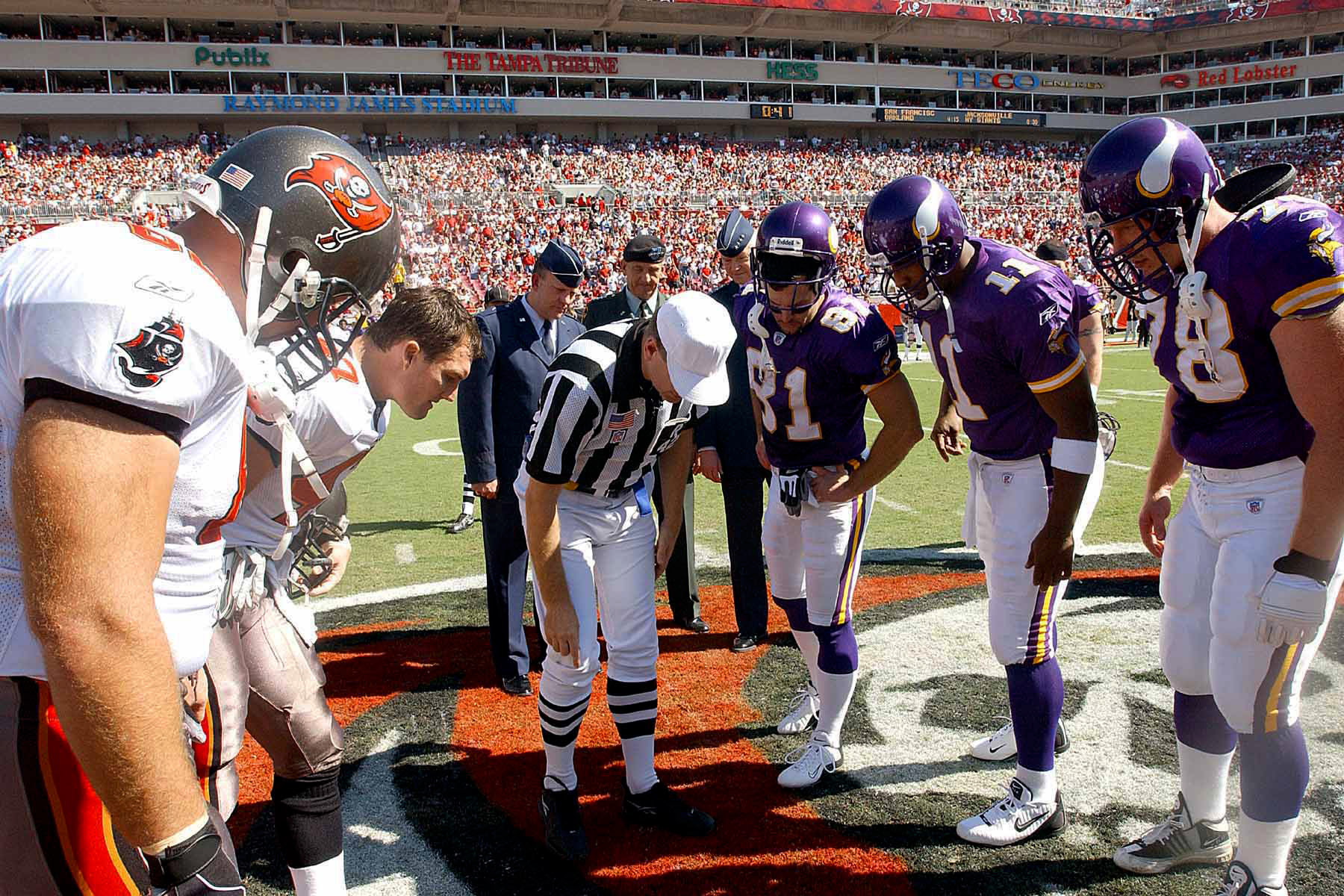
Culpepper (#11) in 2002

==== Early career and immediate success ====
Culpepper was selected 11th overall in the first round of the 1999 NFL draft by the Minnesota Vikings; he was the fourth quarterback chosen, after Tim Couch (first overall), Donovan McNabb (second) and Akili Smith (third). In his first year Culpepper played in one game, rushing three times for six yards and did not attempt a pass in Week 7 against the San Francisco 49ers.

In 2000, Culpepper was named Minnesota's starting quarterback. In the 2000 regular season opener for the Vikings, Culpepper had three rushing touchdowns in the 30–27 win over the Chicago Bears. He was named NFC Offensive Player of the Week for a Week 6 performance against the Tampa Bay Buccaneers, where he helped lead the team to a fourth-quarter comeback. He led the Vikings to victory in the first seven games and helped them finish 11–5. The Vikings defeated the New Orleans Saints in the Divisional Round 34–16 with Culpepper passing for 302 yards and three touchdowns. In the NFC Championship, they lost to the New York Giants 41–0 with Culpepper throwing three interceptions to go with 78 passing yards. During the season, Culpepper passed for 3,937 yards, 33 touchdowns and 16 interceptions. He also rushed 89 times for 470 yards and seven touchdowns. At the end of the year, he was selected to his first Pro Bowl.

==== Struggles and comeback ====
Culpepper struggled over the next two seasons beginning in 2001, throwing 14 touchdowns to 13 interceptions. The Vikings finished the season 5–11. Culpepper started all 11 games in which he appeared, and missed the final five games of the season with a knee injury suffered in a December 2 game against the Pittsburgh Steelers. Culpepper's rushing total ranked third among NFL quarterbacks, trailing only Pittsburgh's Kordell Stewart (537) and Philadelphia’s Donovan McNabb (482).

In Week 15 of the 2002 season, Culpepper threw for 312 yards and two touchdowns in a 32–31 win over the Saints to earn NFC Offensive Player of the Week. Overall, Culpepper continued to struggle in 2002. He threw 18 touchdowns to 23 interceptions and leading the Vikings to a 6–10 record. He also fumbled an NFL record 23 times, losing nine of them. Culpepper's ten rushing scores led all NFL QBs in 2002 and also marked the sixth-highest total by a quarterback in NFL history.

Culpepper was named NFC Offensive Player of the Month for September. In Week 10, on the road against the San Diego Chargers, he passed for 370 yards, four touchdowns, and one interception in the 42–28 loss. In the next game, a road loss to the Oakland Raiders, he had 396 passing yards, one passing touchdown, and three interceptions to go with a rushing touchdown. Overall, he made a comeback in 2003, leading the Vikings to a 9–7 record, although they missed the playoffs. He passed for 3,479 yards, 25 touchdowns, and 11 interceptions to with 73 carries for 422 rushing yards and four touchdowns, and earned his second trip to the Pro Bowl.

==== 2004 season ====
Culpepper enjoyed his best statistical season as a professional in the 2004 season. In Week 1, he passed for 242 yards and five touchdowns in a 35–17 win over the Dallas Cowboys. In Week 3, passed for 360 yards and two touchdowns to go with a rushing touchdown in a 27–22 win over the Chicago Bears. In Week 5, a 34–28 road overtime win over the Houston Texans, he had 396 yards and five touchdowns. In Week 6, he passed for 425 yards, five touchdowns, and two interceptions in a 38–31 win on the road against the New Orleans Saints. He was named NFC Offensive Player of the Month for October. In Week 10, a 34–31 road loss to the Green Bay Packers, he passed for 363 yards and four touchdowns. In Week 15, a 28–27 road win over the Detroit Lions, he passed for 404 yards, three touchdowns, and one interception. Passing for a league-leading 4,717 yards, a Viking-record 39 touchdowns, and only 11 interceptions, Culpepper was named to his third career Pro Bowl. He also broke Dan Marino's NFL record for combined passing and rushing yards, amassing 5,123 total yards. His 2,323 rushing yards from 2000–2004 also made him only the fourth quarterback in NFL history to run for more than 2,300 yards in a five-season period. (Michael Vick had 3,570 from 2002–2006; Randall Cunningham had 3,232 from 1986–1990; and Steve McNair had 2,387 from 1997–2001). Culpepper’s career rushing average of 26.1 yards per game is fourth-best in history among quarterbacks. Only Vick (47.3 yds/g), Cunningham (30.6 yds/g), and Bobby Douglass (29.8 yds/g) averaged more rushing yards per game during their professional careers. He was named NFC Offensive Player of the Week four times (Weeks 1, 3, 6, and 15). After the 2004 season, Culpepper said the game had "slowed down" for him, saying, "I feel like a Jedi Knight." The 8–8 Vikings reached the playoffs for the second time under Culpepper.

In the Wild Card Round, Culpepper passed for 284 yards and four touchdowns in a 31–17 win over the Packers. In the Divisional Round, against the Philadelphia Eagles, he passed for 316 yards, one touchdown, and two interceptions while having a rushing touchdown in the 27–14 loss.

==== Injury ====
His first two games of the 2005 season were disappointments, as the Vikings went 0–2 while Culpepper threw no touchdown passes, eight interceptions, and fumbled twice at home against the Tampa Bay Buccaneers and on the road against the Cincinnati Bengals. Culpepper rebounded in the third week, throwing for 300 yards and three touchdowns while beating the New Orleans Saints. He was named NFC Offensive Player of the Week for his Week 7 performance against the Green Bay Packers with 280 passing yards and two touchdowns in a 23–20 win. In 2005, he had six touchdowns, twelve interceptions, and five fumbles before being injured in the seventh game (only winning two games). On October 30, he suffered a knee injury during a 38–13 loss to the Carolina Panthers. Culpepper sustained damage to three of the four major ligaments in the knee: the ACL, PCL and MCL. He was placed on injured reserve and began rehabilitation treatment near his home in Florida. Backup Brad Johnson took over in the Carolina game and after losing that one, they won the next six straight games and the team ended up with a 9–7 record. Daunte's final career win–loss record as a starter for the Vikings was 37–40 (48.1% winning percentage).

On December 14, 2005, Culpepper and three other players were charged with indecent conduct, disorderly conduct and lewd or lascivious conduct for their involvement in the 2005 Minnesota Vikings boat cruise scandal, according to court papers and news reports. The maximum penalty they could have faced was 90 days in jail. His defense contended there was racial discrimination among the prosecution. On April 4, 2006, however, the charges against Culpepper were dropped owing to a lack of probable cause.

Culpepper was in negotiations with Zygi Wilf, the new owner of the Vikings, concerning his contract with the team. Rumors surfaced that Culpepper was unhappy with his status in Minnesota due to Johnson's re-emergence following his injury. The Vikings wanted him to rehabilitate in Minnesota because they were not satisfied with his level of treatment in Florida. Culpepper refused this request.

Later, Culpepper expressed his desire to be out of Minnesota. According to the Associated Press, Culpepper said that if he was not traded, he wanted to be released. Culpepper said

because of the fundamental differences I have with management regarding the approach to my personal and professional life, I think it is the best business decision for both parties to go our separate ways.

Culpepper did not insist on being traded to the Miami Dolphins, and orchestrated his trade without the services of his former agent. New Vikings coach Brad Childress likened his dealings with Culpepper to his dealings with Terrell Owens and said he never had a conversation with Daunte that did not involve his contract and getting more money instead of football and the team.

=== Miami Dolphins ===
==== Struggle to return from injury ====
Culpepper was traded to Nick Saban’s Miami Dolphins in exchange for a second-round draft pick. He changed his number from 11 (which he wore in Minnesota, after wearing #12 his rookie season in honor of Randall Cunningham) back to his original number 8, the same number he had at Vanguard High School and the University of Central Florida.

The Dolphins debated whether to pursue Culpepper or Drew Brees during the offseason. The Dolphins decided to bring in Culpepper based on a medical evaluation of the two players. Brees was coming back from a shoulder injury suffered the last game during the 2005 season.

Although still recovering from a serious knee injury the previous year, Culpepper attended and participated in all the Dolphins' offseason practices, including training camp. In early August, he made it public that he felt his knee was only about 85–90% recovered. In Culpepper's preseason game against Carolina, he walked up to cornerback Chris Gamble and thanked him for injuring him, Daunte saying if Gamble had not hit him like that he would still have been in Minnesota.

Culpepper got off to a rocky start in his first two regular-season games, losing both while fans booed him and called for backup Joey Harrington in the second game. However, he had an improved performance in the third game, winning 13–10 over the Tennessee Titans, who had the second-to-last ranked defense in the NFL. However, the next week the Houston Texans with the last ranked defense in the NFL won their first game of the season against the Dolphins.

At this point, the Dolphins were 1–3 and their opponents were 1–11 when not playing Miami. After the Houston loss, Saban noticed Culpepper having trouble in practice due to a nagging bruised shoulder injury and decided to rest Culpepper for a couple of practices. During that Friday's practice, Culpepper and Saban got into a loud, heated argument. Saban had decided to bench Daunte until his shoulder recovered and he got more of the mobility back that he lost due to his knee injury.

On November 30, 2006, Culpepper underwent arthroscopic surgery on his previously injured knee to remove a piece of loose cartilage that was causing him difficulty. On December 12, 2006, Culpepper was placed on injured reserve, officially ending his 2006 season. Saban stated that although Culpepper was progressing in rehabilitation, he and the medical staff felt it would be difficult for Culpepper to play in the next three weeks.

On December 25, 2006, Steve Young appeared as a guest announcer during the Dolphins’ penultimate game and criticized Culpepper's work ethic. Culpepper saw this on TV from his box suite at Dolphin Stadium and immediately walked to the ESPN booth and waited for Steve Young to finish, then confronted Young and said he has not missed any meetings and that was not who he was. Young apologized and said though he heard Culpepper had been missing meetings, he should have checked with Culpepper first before repeating it. After the season, Saban left for a head coaching job at the University of Alabama. On January 21, 2007, the South Florida Sun-Sentinel reported that despite public assertions by Saban, his decision to bench Culpepper actually had little to do with his knee and more to do with his head.

==== Departure ====
Without Culpepper, the Dolphins relied on quarterbacks Cleo Lemon and Gibran Hamdan, both of whom were considered unproven, and had until then combined for only one regular season start. In the Dolphins’ initial mini-camp under first-year coach Cam Cameron, both players struggled to move the offense. This poor performance led to an April 15 report stating a much-discussed trade for Kansas City’s Trent Green was imminent, for Culpepper could not participate in minicamp as he continued to recover from knee surgery. The weekend before the report, Culpepper revealed that the second surgery, designed to address scar tissue in the knee, was more serious than anyone originally divulged and required a rehabilitation period of 4–6 months. Culpepper said his surgeon Dr. James Andrews told him to "begin to ease into things" after May 1.

On June 5, 2007, the Dolphins completed the long-awaited trade for Trent Green; a few hours before the Green trade became official, the Dolphins told Culpepper they “are going in a different direction at the QB position,” according to Culpepper, who resisted that plan.

On June 7, Culpepper, acting as his own agent, asked to be released from his contract with the Dolphins.

Culpepper was on the Dolphins' practice field for the start of a weekend minicamp on June 8, one day after asking for his release and two days after Miami completed a trade with Kansas City for Trent Green, who took over at quarterback.

Informed by quarterbacks coach Terry Shea that he would not be permitted to take part in any team drills during the Dolphins' June 8–10 minicamp, Culpepper stated that he would seek intervention from the NFL Players Association to end the stalemate. He was finally released by the Dolphins on July 17.

=== Oakland Raiders ===
Culpepper was first and most often linked to the Jacksonville Jaguars, but Jaguars head coach Jack Del Rio said he did not feel Culpepper would be a good fit. Culpepper worked out for the Tampa Bay Buccaneers soon after his release, but was not acquired by the team. On July 31, Culpepper signed a one-year contract with the Oakland Raiders, as an insurance policy after the Raiders struggled to sign number-one draft pick JaMarcus Russell, with whom they were engaging in contract negotiations. In 2007, Culpepper replaced the injured Josh McCown for the Raiders' matchup against his former team, the Miami Dolphins. Culpepper finished the 35–17 victory with two passing and three rushing touchdowns. Culpepper started a total of six games for Oakland. Before the Week 13 game against the Denver Broncos, Culpepper was nursing a sore quadriceps. He said he suffered the injury during the Week 12 game against the Kansas City Chiefs but it did not begin to bother him until Wednesday. Some sources said Culpepper suffered the injury when he ran a race with Oakland cornerback and former college sprinter Stanford Routt after practice but head coach Lane Kiffin declined knowledge of the alleged incident. Due to his injury, Culpepper did not play again that season and was placed on injured reserve on December 26. He finished the 2007 season with six starts with 1,331 passing yards, five passing touchdowns, and five interceptions to go with three rushing touchdowns.

=== 2008 retirement and comeback ===
Culpepper visited the Green Bay Packers on April 23 and 24, 2008. He later turned down their offer of $1 million for a one-year contract, claiming the deal was not good. He said he was in contact with a few other teams. In July 2008, it was reported that the Detroit Lions were interested in signing Culpepper, but they never made him an offer. He worked out with the Pittsburgh Steelers in August 2008, but the Steelers elected to sign Byron Leftwich instead to replace the injured Charlie Batch. On August 29, 2008, Culpepper then changed his mind and stated he would consider a backup role in Green Bay if they were still interested in him, but the team did not put forth an offer.

On September 4, 2008, Culpepper announced his retirement. He expressed his frustrations with the NFL in a brief retirement letter. The main reason of his retirement was because he felt he could still be a starting quarterback in the NFL.

The Kansas City Chiefs had spoken to Culpepper about coming out of retirement for the 2008 season after Brodie Croyle was declared out for the season with an injury. On October 23, Culpepper stated in an email to Adam Schefter that he would come out of retirement and give the NFL another shot. On October 27, Culpepper told the Chiefs that he would not make another meeting with the team due to a “better opportunity with another team”.

=== Detroit Lions ===
On November 2, 2008, ESPN reported that Culpepper agreed to a two-year deal with the Detroit Lions and would join the team the following week. After passing a physical, Culpepper officially signed with the Lions on November 3. The Lions assigned Culpepper number 11, the number Roy Williams wore before he was traded to Dallas on October 14. Culpepper played four games with the Lions before suffering a shoulder injury. On December 28, 2008, the Lions became the first team in NFL history to go 0–16.

==== 2009 ====
In an interview with Sirius NFL Radio, former Lions wide receiver Mike Furrey said he had heard through former Lions teammates that the Lions planned to make Culpepper the starter for the 2009 season.

On February 16, 2009, the Lions reached an agreement with Culpepper for a restructured deal that would keep him on the team in the second year of his two-year contract. He had been due a $2.5 million roster bonus later in February prior to the restructuring.

On September 7, 2009, it was reported first overall draft pick Matthew Stafford was named the starter for the Lions regular season opener against the Saints. During the preseason, Culpepper had suffered a foot injury. Culpepper said he would respect Matthew Stafford as the starter, but was not opposed to being traded.

On December 14, 2009, Culpepper played in what the Detroit Free Press headlined as “Lions suffer one of their biggest defeats in history.” Played in Baltimore, the Ravens won the game 48–3. In week 14, versus the Arizona Cardinals, Culpepper was benched in favor of third-string quarterback Drew Stanton after a poor performance. He ended up starting Week 17 against the Chicago Bears and passing for two touchdowns and one interception in a 37–23 loss. In the 2009 season, he started five games and finished with 945 passing yards, three touchdowns, and six interceptions.

=== Sacramento Mountain Lions ===
Culpepper signed with the Sacramento Mountain Lions of the United Football League on June 7, 2010. The signing reunited Culpepper with Dennis Green, his former head coach in Minnesota, and Mike Kruczek, his former head coach at the University of Central Florida. Culpepper was named UFL Offensive Player of the Week, twice in the 2010 season. His best game came in week 2, beating the Florida Tuskers 24–20, throwing for 374 yards and two passing touchdowns and one rushing touchdown. In April 2011, Culpepper was placed on the protected players' list, for the 2011 UFL season.

=== 2011 ===
On August 14, 2011, San Francisco 49ers head coach Jim Harbaugh announced that Culpepper was working out for the team on the following Monday to possibly add him to the 49ers roster. However, the 49ers opted to sign Culpepper's former Oakland Raider teammate Josh McCown instead.

Culpepper was named the 45th best quarterback of the modern era by Football Nation.

== Career statistics ==
Legend
	NFL record
	Led the league
**Bold**	Career high

=== NFL ===
==== Regular season ====
Year	Team	Games			Passing								Rushing				Sacks		Fumbles	
Year	Team	GP	GS	Record	Cmp	Att	Pct	Yds	Avg	TD	Int	Rtg	Att	Yds	Avg	TD	Sck	SckY	Fum	Lost
1999	MIN	1	0	—	0	0	0.0	0	0.0	0	0	0.0	3	6	2.0	0	0	0	1	0
2000	MIN	16	16	**11–5**	297	474	62.7	3,937	8.3	33	16	98.0	89	470	5.3	7	34	181	11	3
2001	MIN	11	11	4–7	235	366	64.2	2,612	7.1	14	13	83.3	71	416	5.9	5	33	186	16	6
2002	MIN	16	16	6–10	333	**549**	60.7	3,853	7.0	18	**23**	75.3	**106**	**609**	5.7	**10**	**47**	**244**	**23**	**9**
2003	MIN	14	14	7–7	295	454	65.0	3,479	7.7	25	11	96.4	73	422	5.8	4	37	196	16	6
2004	MIN	16	16	8–8	**379**	548	**69.2**	**4,717**	**8.6**	**39**	11	**110.9**	88	406	4.6	2	46	238	9	2
2005	MIN	7	7	2–5	139	216	64.4	1,564	7.2	6	12	72.0	24	147	**6.1**	1	31	169	5	3
2006	MIA	4	4	1–3	81	134	60.4	929	6.9	2	3	77.0	10	20	2.0	1	21	150	3	0
2007	OAK	7	6	2–4	108	186	58.1	1,331	7.2	5	5	78.0	20	40	2.0	3	21	130	9	3
2008	DET	5	5	0–5	60	115	52.2	786	6.8	4	6	63.9	12	25	2.1	1	14	95	5	1
2009	DET	8	5	0–5	89	157	56.7	945	6.0	3	6	64.8	18	91	5.1	0	14	107	4	0
Career		105	100	41–59	2,016	3,199	63.0	24,153	7.6	149	106	87.8	514	2,652	5.2	34	298	1,696	102	33

==== Postseason ====
Year	Team	Games			Passing								Rushing				Sacks		Fumbles	
Year	Team	GP	GS	Record	Cmp	Att	Pct	Yds	Avg	TD	Int	Rtg	Att	Yds	Avg	TD	Sck	SckY	Fum	Lost
1999	MIN	0	0	Did not play																
2000	MIN	2	2	1–1	30	59	50.8	380	6.4	3	**3**	67.1	6	61	**10.2**	0	4	18	**2**	**1**
2004	MIN	2	2	1–1	**43**	**75**	**57.3**	**600**	**8.0**	**5**	2	**94.3**	**12**	**72**	6.0	**1**	**6**	**44**	1	0
Career		4	4	2–2	73	134	54.5	980	7.3	8	5	82.3	18	133	7.4	1	10	62	3	1

=== UFL ===
Year	Team	Games		Passing							
Year	Team	GP	GS	Cmp	Att	Pct	Yds	Avg	TD	Int	Rtg
2010	SAC	8	8	183	300	61.0	1,944	6.5	10	12	74.4
Career		8	8	183	300	61.0	1,944	6.5	10	12	74.4

=== College ===
Season	Team	GP	Passing							Rushing		
Season	Team	GP	Cmp	Att	Pct	Yds	TD	Int	Rtg	Att	Yds	TD
1995	UCF	11	168	294	57.1	2,071	12	10	123.0	85	17	5
1996	UCF	11	187	314	59.6	2,565	19	**15**	138.6	94	102	2
1997	UCF	11	238	381	62.5	3,086	25	10	146.9	136	438	5
1998	UCF	11	**296**	**402**	**73.6**	**3,690**	**28**	7	**170.2**	**141**	**463**	**12**
Career		44	889	1,391	63.9	11,412	84	42	146.7	456	1,020	24

== Awards and honors ==
NFL

- 3× Pro Bowl (2000, 2003, 2004)
- NFL passing yards leader (2004)
- NFL passing touchdowns leader (2000)
- 50 Greatest Vikings
- Minnesota Vikings All-Mall of America Field Team
- AFC Offensive Player of the Week (Week 4, 2007)
- Vikings Ed Block Courage Award (2001)
- Best Breakthrough Athlete ESPY Award (2001)
- Extra Effort Award (2003)
- 2× Korey Stringer Good Guy Award (2003, 2004)

UFL

- UFL Offensive Co-Player of the Week (Week 2, 2010)
- UFL Offensive Player of the Week (Week 7, 2010)

College

- Sammy Baugh Trophy (1998)
- NCAA completion percentage leader (1998)
- UCF Knights No. 8 honored

== Other appearances ==
Culpepper appeared in an episode of George Lopez along with Donovan McNabb. In the episode Culpepper is trying to recruit Jason McNamara to play for Central Florida, competing against McNabb who wants Jason to go to Syracuse.

Culpepper also appeared in the movie 50 First Dates.

Culpepper was a guest star at the 2013 Super Bash event hosted by NFL UK in London.

== See also ==
- Most consecutive games with at least five touchdown passes
- Madden NFL Cover Athletes
- Madden Curse
