= 2010 UFL season =

American football league season

2010 United Football League season

Regular season
- Duration: September 18, 2010 – November 20, 2010

2010 UFL Championship Game
- Date: November 27, 2010
- Site: Johnny Rosenblatt Stadium, Omaha, Nebraska
- Champion: Las Vegas Locomotives
- Runner-up: Florida Tuskers

The 2010 United Football League season was the second season of the United Football League. The regular season ran from September 18 to November 20 and featured five teams playing eight games each (twice against each of the other teams) over a 10-week span. The 2010 season was a relatively competitive one as no team won more than five games, and no team lost more than five. The season ended with the 2010 UFL Championship Game on November 27 at Johnny Rosenblatt Stadium in Omaha, Nebraska, where the Las Vegas Locomotives defeated the Florida Tuskers, 23–20.

== League changes for 2010 ==
The UFL based its plans for 2010 in part on the lessons learned from its inaugural season in 2009, a year the league considered a modest "dress rehearsal". One of the lessons learned from 2009 was that the league performed better in cities that did not have an NFL presence. To that end, the league relocated two of their 2009 franchises away from NFL markets: The New York Sentinels were relocated to Hartford, Connecticut (where they played one home game in 2009) and were renamed the Hartford Colonials, while the California Redwoods, a team based in the San Francisco Bay Area in 2009, were moved to Sacramento, California and became the Sacramento Mountain Lions. Rentschler Field and Hornet Stadium were the respective home venues for the Colonials and Mountain Lions.

Along with the above franchise shifts, the league set forth to add two new franchises; San Antonio, Texas was considered as the leading candidate for a new team along with Salt Lake City, Los Angeles, and Omaha. Civic leaders in San Antonio were cool to the league's advances, however, citing previous failed football teams in the city and the fear that the UFL's presence would hinder the University of Texas at San Antonio's launch of its Division I college football team in 2011. Instead, the league added just one franchise for 2010, the Omaha Nighthawks, who spent 2010 at Rosenblatt Stadium before moving downtown to TD Ameritrade Park Omaha for 2011.

Three of the four charter teams retained their ownership from the previous year, though some sold portions of their teams to minority owners. The lone exception was the Florida Tuskers; Stuart Sternberg pulled out of ownership after the 2009 season and filed legal action against the league for funds he believes is owed to his company, Sunburst Entertainment Group. After spending the offseason and the first four weeks of the season under league ownership, a group led by Joe Theismann purchased the Tuskers in October 2010. NetSuite CEO Zach Nelson agreed to purchase the Omaha Nighthawks. Mark Cuban also loaned the league $5 million in April 2010; in January 2011, he filed a federal lawsuit against the league after they had yet to repay the loan.

To account for the odd number of teams (five), each team played an eight-game schedule over a 10-week span (as opposed to six games in seven weeks during 2009); two bye weeks for each team were included. The schedule's double round robin format remained intact. Also, all of the games were being played in the teams' home stadiums, as opposed to the neutral site "barnstorming" approach used for some of the 2009 games.

In another change from 2009, the UFL strengthened local exposure of its teams, including radio coverage (see Broadcasting below) and the establishment of training camps and practices at sites in each team's market. (During 2009, the teams trained and practiced in two sites, Orlando and Casa Grande, Arizona.) Additionally, each team gained their own uniform identity for 2010, loosening them from the standard league colors (green, blue, black, silver) and uniform template used in 2009.

- The Hartford Colonials adopted a navy blue and gold color scheme.
- The Omaha Nighthawks' colors are metallic silver, black and slate gray, as well as donning the league's first ever alternate jersey of a camouflage color scheme.
- The Sacramento Mountain Lions sport shades of gold and tan along with black trim.
- The Las Vegas Locomotives kept silver and black in their palette, but replaced UFL blue with crimson (which replaced silver as the main color on their home jerseys).
- The Florida Tuskers retained their UFL blue/black/silver palette, with black replacing blue as the primary home jersey color.

The 2010 season was a high-water mark for the league. The Sacramento and Omaha franchises were rousing successes with their fanbases, regularly playing to sold-out stadiums with over 20,000 fans a week. The league's salaries would be the highest in its history, peaking at $200,000 a year for a starting quarterback (a level comparable to the National Football League's minimum per-game salary); as such, the league was able to sign prominent NFL veterans such as Daunte Culpepper (Sacramento) and Jeff Garcia (Omaha). The inability to sustain that level of spending and the systemic lack of sustainable revenue sources to match it became evident shortly after the season, prompting the league's slow unraveling over the course of the next two seasons. The league had intended to lose money the first two seasons in an effort to sell their product to television for a rights fee high enough to sustain spending at 2010 levels, but the networks refused to buy a rights package, instead insisting on payment from the league for television coverage.

== Coaching changes for 2010 ==
Team	2010 Coach	2009 Coach	Reason for leaving	Story/Accomplishments
Hartford Colonials	Chris Palmer	Ted Cottrell	Fired	Cottrell compiled an 0-6 (.000) record in his lone season as the head coach of the New York Sentinels. Upon the team's move to Hartford, Palmer, a longtime NFL assistant and the first head coach of the revived Cleveland Browns, was named head coach and general manager.
Florida Tuskers	Jay Gruden	Jim Haslett	Resigned	Before leaving to become defensive coordinator for the NFL's Washington Redskins, Haslett compiled a 6-1 (.857) record, including a perfect 2009 regular season and an overtime loss in the championship game. He was replaced by Gruden, the Tuskers' offensive coordinator and a former coach of the Arena Football League's Orlando Predators; he is the brother of current Oakland Raiders' head coach Jon Gruden.
Omaha Nighthawks	Jeff Jagodzinski	N/A	N/A	Jagodzinski was named as the expansion franchise's first head coach on April 15, 2010. He has coached in the NFL and college football for over 20 years, including a 2-year stint as Boston College head coach.

== Broadcasting ==
The 2010 season was the second and final year in the UFL's initial broadcast deals with HDNet and Versus; HDNet carried 10 regular season games, while Versus carried eight games plus the championship game. In addition, the league gained its first partnership with a regional network—the New England–based NESN, which carried two Hartford Colonials home games. The league website provided live and archived video streaming for all games, while YouTube provided a live HD simulcast of Versus' Championship Game broadcast with additional content.

Also, UFL games were carried on radio for the first time, with each team having their own flagship station:

Team	2010 Radio broadcaster
Florida Tuskers	WYGM (740 AM) (primary); WFLF (540 AM) (secondary)
Hartford Colonials	WPOP (1410 AM)
Las Vegas Locomotives	KWWN (1100 AM) (primary); KBAD (920 AM) (secondary)
Omaha Nighthawks	KOZN (1620 AM)
Sacramento Mountain Lions	KHTK (1140 AM)

== Standings ==
United Football League
	W	L	T	PCT	PF	PA	STK
y-Las Vegas Locomotives	5	3	0	.625	174	142	L2
y-Florida Tuskers	5	3	0	.625	213	136	W3
Sacramento Mountain Lions	4	4	0	.500	169	164	W2
Hartford Colonials	3	5	0	.375	169	194	W1
Omaha Nighthawks	3	5	0	.375	113	202	L4

y-denotes team has clinched a 2010 UFL championship game berth

== Championship Game ==
The 2010 UFL Championship was held on November 27, 2010 (two days after Thanksgiving) and involved the Las Vegas Locomotives and Florida Tuskers, who finished first and second, respectively, in the league standings. The Locomotives won the championship game for the second straight year, beating the Tuskers 23-20 behind an MVP performance by quarterback Chase Clement and a blocked field goal by defensive lineman Alfred Malone on the final play. The game was played at Johnny Rosenblatt Stadium in Omaha, Nebraska, which was chosen as host venue on October 18, 2010, after the league employed a formula that took into consideration "advance ticket and merchandise sales, energy for all events prior to the season starting, and team record" to determine the site. (The first-year Nighthawks sold out each of their 4 home games, including the first UFL game with over 20,000 in attendance.)

== Attendance ==
The UFL's attendance generally improved from its inaugural season; in that year, the average attendance was 9,678 spectators per game, with one game as low as 4,312 fans and the highest-attended game at less than 18,187. For the 20 home dates in the 2010 regular season, crowd numbers ranged from a high of 23,554 (Las Vegas at Omaha on October 28) to a low of 8,451 (Hartford at Las Vegas on October 23). The league's newest markets—Omaha, Sacramento, and Hartford—were the front runners in attendance, with the Nighthawks selling out all 4 of their home games and never failing to draw less than 21,000 to Johnny Rosenblatt Stadium. The Mountain Lions and Colonials saw marked improvements from their 2009 seasons in the San Francisco and New York markets, respectively.

After being the attendance leaders in 2009, both Las Vegas and Florida suffered noticeable declines at the turnstiles during 2010. The crowd decrease for the Locos, coupled with a high rate of rent at Sam Boyd Stadium, led the league and team management to consider a smaller, more affordable home stadium for 2011, such as Cashman Field.

Note that in the table below, numbers for the Sacramento Mountain Lions are rounded to the nearest 500 spectators; Sacramento did not give out exact ticket counts and only offered estimates.

Team	Home Gms	Home Total	Home Avg	Top Home Crowd	Road Gms	Road Total	Road Avg	Overall Gms	Overall Total	Overall Avg
Omaha Nighthawks	4	91,143	22,785	23,554 (10/28 vs. LV)	4	53,026	13,256	8	144,169	18,021
Sacramento Mountain Lions	4	72,500	18,125	20,000 (9/25 vs. FLA and 11/13 vs. OMA)	4	61,488	15,372	8	133,988	16,749
Hartford Colonials	4	57,462	14,366	14,554 (11/20 vs. LV)	4	54,655	13,664	8	112,117	14,015
Las Vegas Locomotives	4	40,943	10,236	13,622 (11/6 vs. SAC)	4	66,161	16,540	8	107,104	13,388
Florida Tuskers	4	37,689	9,422	10,066 (10/21 vs. SAC)	4	64,677	16,169	8	102,366	12,796
League	20	299,737	14,987	23,554 (LV at OMA on 10/23)	20	300,007	15,000	-	-	-

== Awards ==
=== Players of the week ===
Week	Offense	Defense	Special Teams
1	Josh McCown, QB, Hartford	Brandon Moore, LB, Las Vegas	Nick Novak, K, Florida
2	Daunte Culpepper, QB, Sacramento; Jeff Garcia, QB, Omaha	Zeke Moreno, LB, Sacramento	Fabrizio Scaccia, K, Sacramento
3	DeDe Dorsey, RB, Las Vegas	Eric Henderson, DE, Las Vegas	Tom Malone, P, Sacramento
4	Dominic Rhodes, RB, Florida	Isaiah Trufant, CB, Las Vegas	Nick Novak, K, Florida
5	Jeff Garcia, QB, Omaha	Lewis Baker, S, Las Vegas	Steve Hauschka, K, Las Vegas
6	Daunte Culpepper, QB, Sacramento	Derek Walker, DE, Hartford	Steve Hauschka, K, Las Vegas
7	Lorenzo Booker, RB, Hartford	Kevin Hobbs, CB, Las Vegas	Aaron Woods, KR, Sacramento
8	Chris Greisen, QB, Florida	Keiwan Ratliff, CB, Florida	Fabrizio Scaccia, K, Sacramento
9	Cory Ross, RB, Sacramento; Dominic Rhodes, RB, Florida	Eric Moncur, DE, Sacramento	Nick Novak, K, Florida
10	Chris Greisen, QB, Florida	Darius Vinnett, CB, Florida	Nick Novak, K, Florida

=== Players and Coach of the Year ===
- Offensive Player of the Year: Cory Ross, Running Back, Sacramento Mountain Lions
- Defensive Player of the Year: Isaiah Trufant, Cornerback, Las Vegas Locomotives
- Special Teams Player of the Year: Nick Novak, Kicker, Florida Tuskers
- Coach of the Year: Jim Fassel, Las Vegas Locomotives
