= 2008 Baltimore Ravens season =

NFL team season

- Owner: Steve Bisciotti
- General manager: Ozzie Newsome
- Head coach: John Harbaugh
- Offensive coordinator: Cam Cameron
- Defensive coordinator: Rex Ryan
- Home stadium: M&T Bank Stadium

Results
- Record: 11–5
- Division place: 2nd AFC North
- Playoffs: Won Wild Card Playoffs (at Dolphins) 27–9; Won Divisional Playoffs (at Titans) 13–10; Lost AFC Championship (at Steelers) 14–23
- Pro Bowlers: FB LeRon McClain; OLB Terrell Suggs; MLB Ray Lewis; FS Ed Reed; ST Brendon Ayanbadejo

Uniform
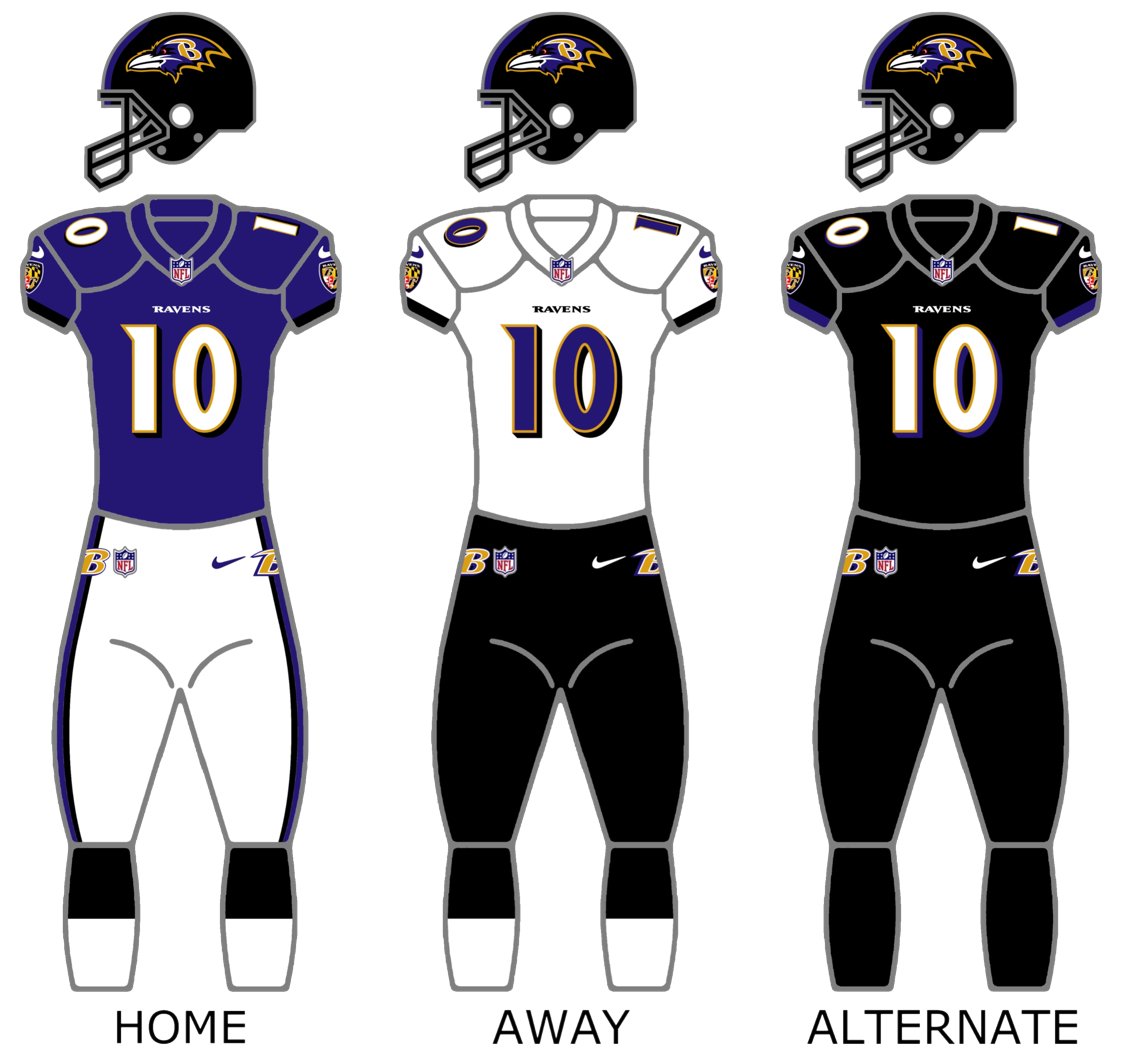

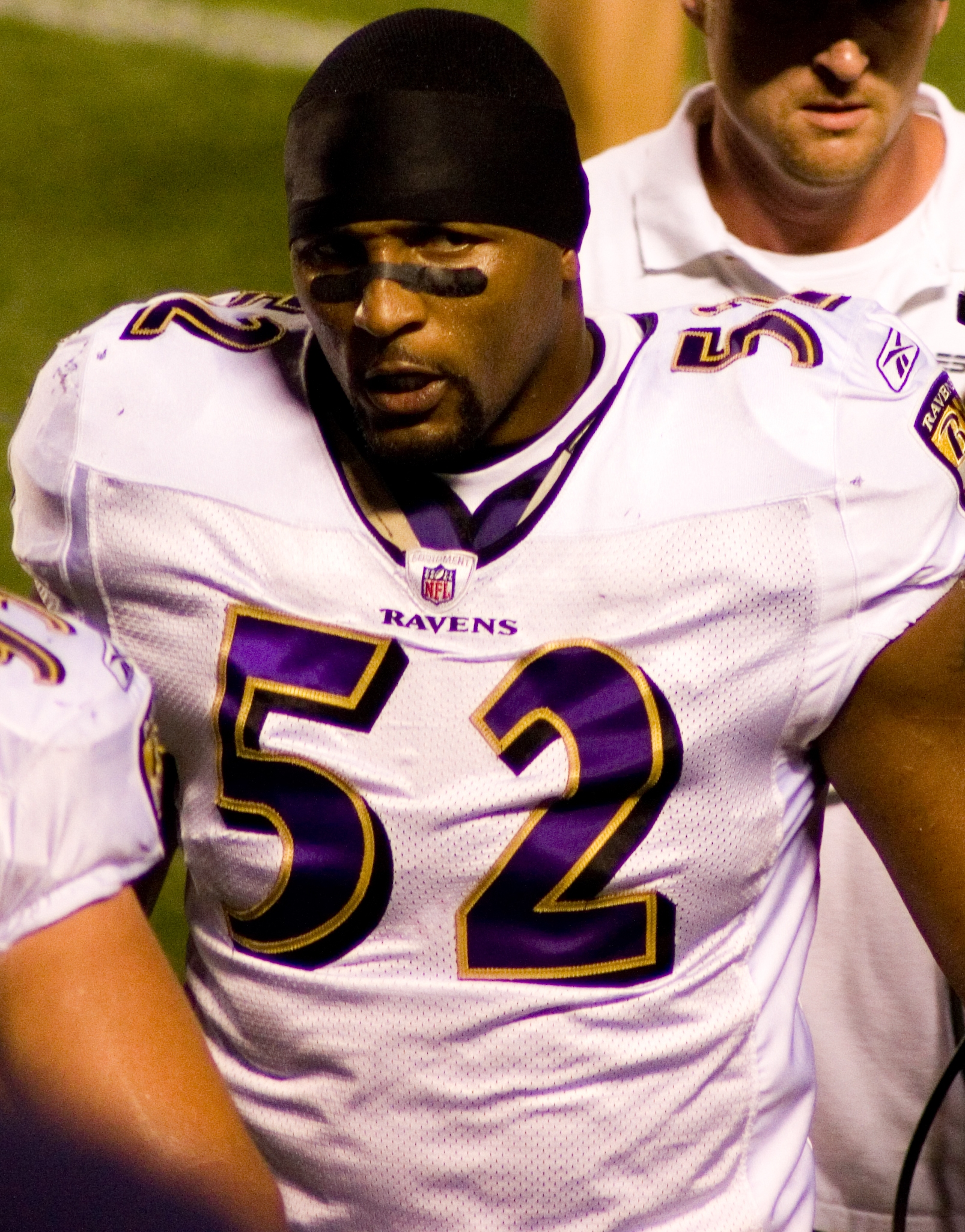
Ravens' linebacker Ray Lewis, 2008

The 2008 season was the Baltimore Ravens' 13th in the National Football League (NFL), their 1st under head coach John Harbaugh, and their 12th season under general manager Ozzie Newsome.

The Ravens completed a major turnaround from the 2007 season, finishing the season with an 11–5 record and a playoff berth. They defeated the Miami Dolphins in the wild-card round of the playoffs, and then in the divisional round they defeated the Tennessee Titans, who had compiled the best record in the NFL over the regular season. However, in the AFC championship game, the Ravens' season came to an end as they were defeated by their division rival and eventual Super Bowl XLIII champion Pittsburgh Steelers 23–14, denying what would have been a bird-themed Super Bowl, with the other finalists being the Arizona Cardinals and Philadelphia Eagles.

Quarterback Joe Flacco, drafted 18th overall in the 2008 draft, became the first quarterback in NFL history to win multiple playoff games in his rookie season. Flacco would be joined by Mark Sanchez of the New York Jets the following year. That team would be led by Rex Ryan, formerly the Ravens' defensive coordinator.

== Offseason ==
=== Coaching staff ===
==== Head coach ====
On December 31, 2007, Brian Billick was fired after coaching the team to a 5–11 record, finishing last overall in the AFC North Division. Three weeks later, on January 18, 2008, John Harbaugh was hired to replace Brian Billick as the third head coach in the franchise's young history. Harbaugh was the defensive secondary coach for the Philadelphia Eagles, coaching such players as Pro Bowl cornerback Lito Sheppard and free safety Brian Dawkins.

==== Coordinators ====
After not having a true offensive coordinator during the 2007 season (Billick had assumed those duties early in the 2006 season after firing Jim Fassel, although Rick Neuheisel had been listed on the coaching staff in that capacity), addressing this position was as much of a priority for new head coach John Harbaugh as it was for owner Steve Bisciotti to find a new head coach for his team, at the time. Recently dismissed as head coach from the Miami Dolphins, Malcolm 'Cam' Cameron was highly sought after for his offensive expertise from his time in San Diego with the Chargers. After some deliberation amongst offers he received from around the league, Cameron chose to come to the Ravens, and John Harbaugh announced him as the offensive coordinator on January 23, 2008.

Rex Ryan was 'released from duty' as the team's defensive coordinator, but was still under contract to the Ravens as a defensive coordinator in name for one more year, should new head coach John Harbaugh decide to hire him onto his staff, thus making him ineligible to accept the same position with any other NFL football team. Ryan, at the time was applying for a head coaching position himself, but got no offers for any of the four head coaching vacancies in Atlanta, his own team in Baltimore, Miami, or in Washington. On January 28, 2008, Ryan was re-hired as the Ravens' defensive coordinator and was subsequently promoted to assistant head coach and defensive coordinator after rumors of potential Redskins head coach Jim Zorn circulated that he wanted Ryan to coach the Redskins as its defensive coordinator.

=== Personnel ===
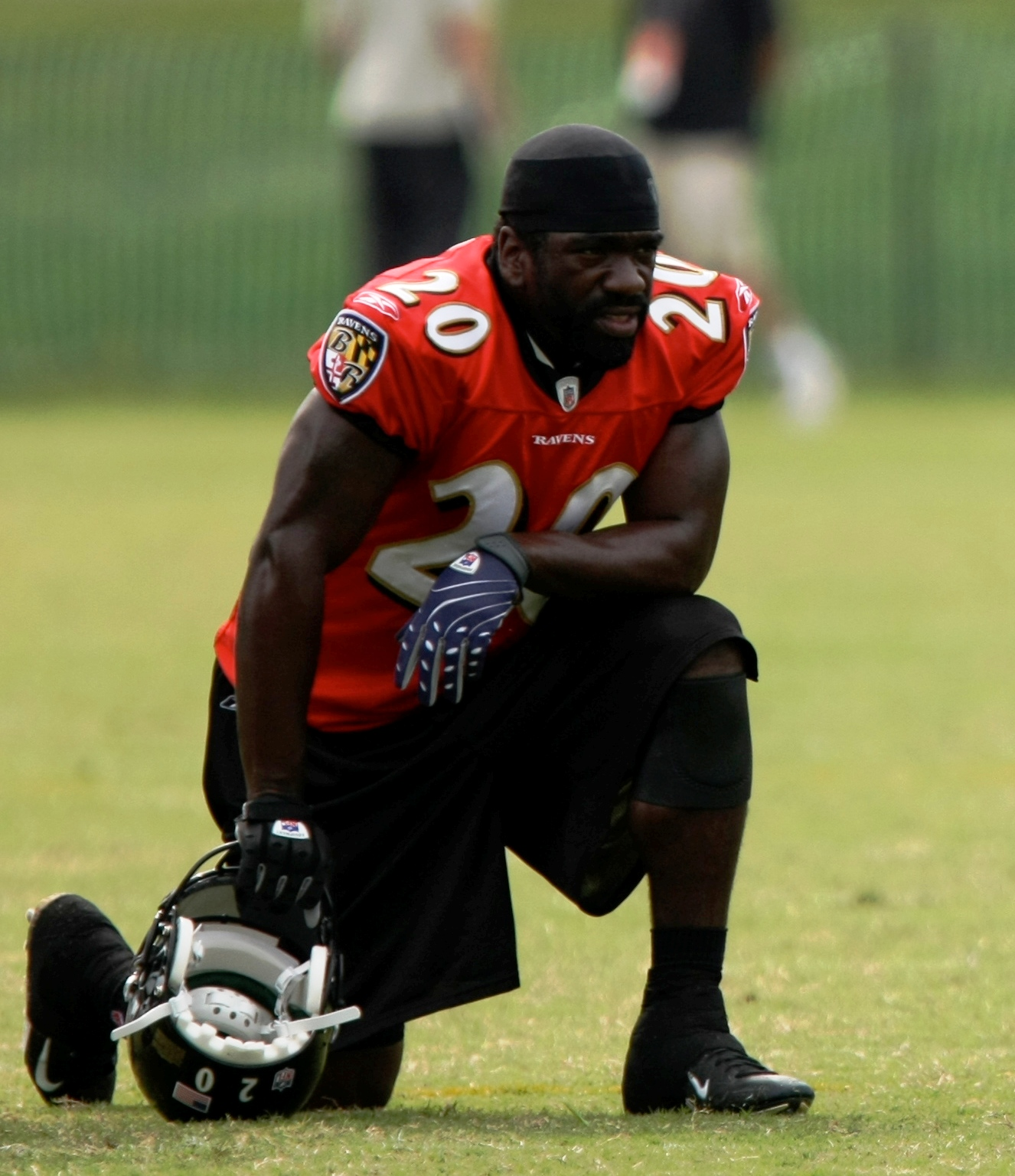
Ravens' free safety Ed Reed at training camp, 2008

==== Offseason / Free agency ====
During the 2008 free agency period, the Ravens acquired linebacker Brendan Ayanbadejo from the Chicago Bears and cornerback Frank Walker from the Green Bay Packers. Both were added to the Ravens roster primarily for their special teams ability, but also to fulfill a pressing need for depth at two positions which were diminished by injuries as the 2007 season wore on. On February 28, 2008, center Mike Flynn was released after failing his annual physical. Flynn was one of the few players remaining from the team's Super Bowl championship season in 2000. After suffering multiple injuries and having to be placed on injured reserve during the 2007 season, veteran quarterback Steve McNair announced his retirement on April 17, 2008, from the NFL. McNair had played a combined 13 seasons with the Ravens and Titans. After being voted to 11 Pro Bowls in 12 seasons, (but only playing in 10 due to a hyperextended big toe) veteran left tackle and the first ever draft selection by the newly created Baltimore Ravens franchise in 1996, Jonathan Ogden announced his retirement on June 12, 2008.

==== 2008 NFL draft ====
The Baltimore Ravens had nine selections going into the 2008 NFL draft, including four compensatory selections. The Ravens traded the eighth overall pick to the Jaguars for Jacksonville's first-round choice (26th overall) as well as two third-round selections (71st and 89th) and a fourth-round (125th) pick. The Ravens then traded the 26th overall pick as well as their third-round (89th) and sixth-round (173) picks to Houston for its first-round (18th) pick. The Ravens traded their 38th overall pick to the Seattle Seahawks for their second-round pick and gained another selection in the third-round, which were at 55 and 86, respectively. The Ravens then traded their second fourth-round pick (125th overall) to the Oakland Raiders for cornerback Fabian Washington.

2008 Baltimore Ravens draft
Round	Pick	Player	Position	College	Notes
1	18	Joe Flacco	QB	Delaware	
2	55	Ray Rice *	RB	Rutgers	
3	71	Tavares Gooden	LB	Miami (FL)	
3	86	Tom Zbikowski	S	Notre Dame	
3	99	Oniel Cousins	OT	UTEP	
4	106	Marcus Smith	WR	New Mexico	
4	133	David Hale	OT	Weber State	
6	206	Haruki Nakamura	S	Cincinnati	
7	215	Justin Harper	WR	Virginia Tech	
7	240	Allen Patrick	RB	Oklahoma	
Made roster † Pro Football Hall of Fame * Made at least one Pro Bowl during career

== Personnel ==
=== Staff / Coaches ===
Baltimore Ravens 2008 staff
Front office: Owner – Steve Bisciotti; Minority owner – Art Modell; President – Dick Cass; General manager/Executive Vice President – Ozzie Newsome; Vice president of football administration – Pat Moriarty; Director of pro personnel – George Kokinis; Assistant director of pro personnel – Vincent Newsome; Director of college scouting – Eric DeCosta; Head coaches: Head coach – John Harbaugh; Special assistant to the head coach – Vic Fangio; Offensive coaches: Offensive coordinator – Cam Cameron; Quarterbacks – Hue Jackson; Running backs – Wilbert Montgomery; Wide receivers – Jim Hostler; Tight ends/assistant offensive line – Wade Harman; Offensive line – John Matsko; Assistant offensive line – Andy Moeller; Offensive assistant – Craig Ver Steeg	Defensive coaches: Assistant head coach/defensive coordinator – Rex Ryan; Defensive line – Clarence Brooks; Linebackers – Greg Mattison; Outside linebackers – Mike Pettine; Defensive backs – Mark Carrier; Secondary – Chuck Pagano; Coaching assistant – Roy Anderson; Special teams coaches: Special teams coordinator – Jerry Rosburg; Assistant special teams – Marwan Maalouf; Kicking consultant – Randy Brown; Strength and conditioning: Strength and conditioning – Bob Rogucki; Assistant strength and conditioning – John Dunn

=== Final roster ===
Baltimore Ravens 2008 final roster
Quarterbacks: 2 Todd Bouman; 5 Joe Flacco; 10 Troy Smith; Running backs: 33 Le'Ron McClain FB; 23 Willis McGahee; 42 Lorenzo Neal FB; 38 Jalen Parmele; 27 Ray Rice KR; Wide receivers: 89 Mark Clayton; 15 Terrance Copper; 16 Yamon Figurs KR/PR; 85 Derrick Mason; 17 Marcus Maxwell; 81 Marcus Smith; Tight ends: 86 Todd Heap; 84 Edgar Jones; 83 Daniel Wilcox	Offensive linemen: 79 Willie Anderson T; 60 Jason Brown C; 65 Chris Chester G; 64 Oniel Cousins G/T; 71 Jared Gaither T; 66 Ben Grubbs G; 76 David Hale C/G; 69 Chad Slaughter T; 78 Adam Terry T; Defensive linemen: 94 Justin Bannan DE; 91 Marques Douglas DE; 68 Brandon McKinney NT; 92 Haloti Ngata NT; 90 Trevor Pryce DE	Linebackers: 51 Brendon Ayanbadejo ILB; 50 Antwan Barnes OLB; 59 Nick Greisen ILB; 95 Jarret Johnson OLB; 52 Ray Lewis ILB; 53 Jameel McClain OLB; 57 Bart Scott ILB; 55 Terrell Suggs OLB; Defensive backs: 35 Corey Ivy CB; 36 Jim Leonhard SS/KR/PR; 43 Haruki Nakamura FS; 25 Evan Oglesby CB; 20 Ed Reed FS; 22 Samari Rolle CB; 39 Daren Stone FS; 41 Frank Walker CB; 31 Fabian Washington CB; 28 Tom Zbikowski SS; Special teams: 6 Stephen Hauschka K; 70 Matt Katula LS; 4 Sam Koch P; 3 Matt Stover K	Reserve lists: 7 Kyle Boller QB (IR); 54 Prescott Burgess LB (IR); 30 P. J. Daniels RB (IR); 96 Lamar Divens NT (IR); 93 Dwan Edwards DE (IR); 56 Tavares Gooden LB (IR); 97 Kelly Gregg NT (IR); 47 Scott Kuhn TE (IR); 26 Dawan Landry S (IR); 29 Derrick Martin CB (IR); 21 Chris McAlister CB (IR); 88 Quinn Sypniewski TE (IR); 98 Kelly Talavou NT (IR); 87 Demetrius Williams WR (IR); 73 Marshal Yanda G (IR); Practice squad: 67 Sean Conover DE; 14 Justin Harper WR (IR); 61 Brian Johnson G; 32 Matt Lawrence RB; 72 Bryan Mattison DE (IR); 24 Anwar Phillips CB; 77 Joe Reitz T (IR); 80 Isaac Smolko TE; 62 Salomón Solano NT ^{Int'l}; 63 Tre' Stallings G; 12 Ernie Wheelwright WR; 18 Edward Williams WR; rookies in italics 53 active, 18 inactive, 9 practice squad

== Schedule ==
=== Preseason ===
Week	Date	Opponent	Result	Record	Venue	Recap
1	August 7	at New England Patriots	**W** 16–15	1–0	Gillette Stadium	Recap
2	August 16	Minnesota Vikings	**L** 15–23	1–1	M&T Bank Stadium	Recap
3	August 23	at St. Louis Rams	**L** 10–24	1–2	Edward Jones Dome	Recap
4	August 28	Atlanta Falcons	**L** 9–10	1–3	M&T Bank Stadium	Recap

=== Regular season ===
Week	Date	Opponent	Result	Record	Venue	Recap
1	September 7	**Cincinnati Bengals**	**W** 17–10	1–0	M&T Bank Stadium	Recap
2	Bye (Note: The Ravens' game at the Houston Texans was postponed from September 14 to November 9 due to Hurricane Ike. Therefore, the Ravens' bye week was moved up from Week 10 to Week 2.)					
3	September 21	**Cleveland Browns**	**W** 28–10	2–0	M&T Bank Stadium	Recap
4	September 29	at **Pittsburgh Steelers**	**L** 20–23 (OT)	2–1	Heinz Field	Recap
5	October 5	Tennessee Titans	**L** 10–13	2–2	M&T Bank Stadium	Recap
6	October 12	at Indianapolis Colts	**L** 3–31	2–3	Lucas Oil Stadium	Recap
7	October 19	at Miami Dolphins	**W** 27–13	3–3	Dolphin Stadium	Recap
8	October 26	Oakland Raiders	**W** 29–10	4–3	M&T Bank Stadium	Recap
9	November 2	at **Cleveland Browns**	**W** 37–27	5–3	Cleveland Browns Stadium	Recap
10	November 9	at Houston Texans	**W** 41–13	6–3	Reliant Stadium	Recap
11	November 16	at New York Giants	**L** 10–30	6–4	Giants Stadium	Recap
12	November 23	Philadelphia Eagles	**W** 36–7	7–4	M&T Bank Stadium	Recap
13	November 30	at **Cincinnati Bengals**	**W** 34–3	8–4	Paul Brown Stadium	Recap
14	December 7	Washington Redskins	**W** 24–10	9–4	M&T Bank Stadium	Recap
15	December 14	**Pittsburgh Steelers**	**L** 9–13	9–5	M&T Bank Stadium	Recap
16	December 20	at Dallas Cowboys	**W** 33–24	10–5	Texas Stadium	Recap
17	December 28	Jacksonville Jaguars	**W** 27–7	11–5	M&T Bank Stadium	Recap
Note: Intra-divisional opponents are in **bold** text.

== Division standings ==
AFC North
	W	L	T	PCT	DIV	CONF	PF	PA	STK
^{(2)} Pittsburgh Steelers	12	4	0	.750	6–0	10–2	347	223	W1
^{(6)} Baltimore Ravens	11	5	0	.688	4–2	8–4	385	244	W2
Cincinnati Bengals	4	11	1	.281	1–5	3–9	204	364	W3
Cleveland Browns	4	12	0	.250	1–5	3–9	232	350	L6

== Game summaries ==
=== Regular season ===
==== Week 1: vs. Cincinnati Bengals ====
Week One: Cincinnati Bengals vs. Baltimore Ravens — Summary

- Game time: 1:00 PM EDT
- Game weather: Sunny, 78 °F or 25.6 °C
- Referee: Scott Green

First quarter

- BAL – Clayton 42-yard run (Stover kick) 2:27

Second quarter

- BAL – Stover 21-yard field goal 1:46
- CIN – Graham 43 yd field goal 0:09

Third quarter

- BAL – Flacco 38-yard run (Stover kick) 0:27

Fourth quarter

- CIN – Joseph 65-yard fumble recovery (Graham PAT) 10:29
- Game attendance: 70,978 at M&T Bank Stadium in Baltimore, Maryland
- TV announcers: (CBS) Kevin Harlan and Rich Gannon
- Game coverage: NFL Game summary, NFL Films highlights

Top passers

- BAL – Joe Flacco – 15/29, 129 yards
- CIN – Carson Palmer – 10/25, 99 yards, INT

Top rushers

- BAL – Le'Ron McClain – 19 rushes, 86 yards
- CIN – Chris Perry – 18 rushes, 37 yards

Top receivers

- BAL – Derrick Mason – 4 receptions, 44 yards
- CIN – T. J. Houshmandzadeh – 3 receptions, 44 yards

	1	2	3	4	Total
Bengals	0	3	0	7	10
Ravens	7	3	7	0	17

The Ravens began their 2008 campaign at home against their toughest AFC North foe, the Cincinnati Bengals. In the first quarter, Baltimore opened the scoring with WR Mark Clayton scoring on a 42-yard TD run from a double-reverse play. In the second quarter, the Ravens increased their advantage with Matt Stover kicking a 21-yard field goal. The Bengals responded with Shayne Graham kicking a 43-yard field goal to end the first half. In the third quarter, Baltimore responded with rookie quarterback Joe Flacco scoring on a 38-yard TD run. In the fourth quarter, Cincinnati tried to rally as CB Johnathan Joseph returned a fumble 65 yards for a touchdown. Ultimately, the Ravens defense stopped a potential Bengals scoring drive on fourth down late in the fourth quarter and won the game.

With the win, the Ravens began their season at 1–0.

Joe Flacco in his rookie debut, completed 15 of 29 passes for 129 yards (along with a touchdown run).

==== Week 2: Bye week ====
The Ravens' Week 2 game against the Houston Texans was postponed from September 14 to November 9, the Ravens' original bye week, due to structural damage to Houston's Reliant Stadium caused by Hurricane Ike.

==== Week 3: vs. Cleveland Browns ====
Week Three: Cleveland Browns vs. Baltimore Ravens — Summary

- Game time: 4:15 PM EDT
- Game weather: Partly Cloudy, 77 °F or 25 °C
- Referee: Ed Hochuli

First quarter

Second quarter

- CLE – Anderson 19-yard pass to Harrison (Dawson kick) 14:52
- BAL – McGahee 5-yard run (Stover kick) 6:40
- CLE – Dawson 38-yard field goal 1:04

Third quarter

- BAL – McClain 1-yard run (Stover kick) 11:13
- BAL – Reed 32-yard interception return (Stover kick) 10:23
- BAL – McClain 1-yard run (Stover kick) 4:49

Fourth quarter

- Game attendance: 71,104 at M&T Bank Stadium in Baltimore, Maryland
- TV announcers: (CBS) Bill Macatee & Steve Beuerlein
- Game coverage: NFL Game summary, NFL Films Highlights

Top passers

- BAL – Joe Flacco – 13/19, 129 yards, 2 INT
- CLE – Derek Anderson – 14/37, 125 yards, TD, 3 INT

Top rushers

- BAL – Le'Ron McClain – 17 rushes, 66 yards, 2 TD
- CLE – Jamal Lewis – 12 rushes, 56 yards

Top receivers

- BAL – Derrick Mason – 4 receptions, 42 yards
- CLE – Braylon Edwards – 3 receptions, 27 yards

	1	2	3	4	Total
Browns	0	10	0	0	10
Ravens	0	7	21	0	28

Coming off an unexpected bye week, the Ravens looked to improve their division standing in the AFC North, playing host to the 0–2 Cleveland Browns. Joe Flacco threw his first career interception in the first quarter, which was scoreless for both teams. The Browns, however, capitalized on the turnover by driving 52 yards for a touchdown, finishing the drive with Derek Anderson completing a 19-yard pass to Jerome Harrison. Baltimore would respond with Willis McGahee scoring on a 5-yard touchdown run, his first of the season. The Browns closed out the first half with a Phil Dawson Field goal to make the score 10 – 7, Browns, at the half. Strong Safety Dawan Landry suffered a mild spinal injury and was taken to the hospital, where X-rays were negative for damage. In the second half, Baltimore won the turnover battle and their defense proved to be the deciding factor in this contest. After Ray Lewis delivered a big hit on Browns' Tight End Kellen Winslow while deflecting a pass, Chris McAlister intercepted the tipped ball and returned the interception to the Browns 10-yard line. Four plays later, Fullback Le'Ron McClain would score on a 1-yard run. On the next possession, Ed Reed intercepted a Derek Anderson pass intended for Tight End Steve Heiden and returned it 32 yards for a touchdown. After forcing another 3-and-out, Baltimore capitalized on a Browns personal foul from the 50-yard line, driving 35 yards for a touchdown, finishing the drive with a 1-yard run from Le'Ron McClain. The Browns tried to rally late in the game, but Samari Rolle intercepted Derek Anderson with less than two minutes to play, ensuring no chance of a comeback.

With the win, and the Pittsburgh Steelers losing 15–6 to the Philadelphia Eagles, the Ravens not only improve to 2–0; they now lead the AFC North after 3 weeks.

==== Week 4: at Pittsburgh Steelers ====
Week Four: Baltimore Ravens vs. Pittsburgh Steelers — Summary

- Game time: 8:30 PM EDT
- Game weather: 65 °F or 18.3 °C, Fair
- Referee: Gene Steratore

First quarter

- PIT – Reed 49-yard field goal 6:44
- BAL – Stover 33-yard field goal 0:22

Second quarter

- BAL – Stover 20-yard field goal 3:52
- BAL – Flacco 4-yard pass to Wilcox (Stover kick) 0:22

Third quarter

- PIT – Roethlisberger 38-yard pass to Holmes (J. Reed kick) 4:09
- PIT – Woodley 7-yard fumble return (J. Reed kick) 3:54

Fourth quarter

- PIT – Jeff Reed 19-yard field goal 9:19.
- BAL – McClain 2-yard run (Stover kick) 4:07

Overtime

- PIT – Reed 46-yard field goal 9:47
- Game attendance: 64,038 at Heinz Field in Pittsburgh, Pennsylvania
- TV announcers: (ESPN) Mike Tirico (play-by-play), Ron Jaworski and Tony Kornheiser (color commentators), Suzy Kolber and Michele Tafoya (sideline reporters)
- Game coverage: NFL Game summary, NFL Films Highlights

Top passers

- PIT – Ben Roethlisberger – 14/24, 191 yards, 1 TD, 1 INT
- BAL – Joe Flacco – 16/31, 192 yards, 1 TD

Top rushers

- PIT – Rashard Mendenhall – 9 rushes, 30 yards
- BAL – Le'Ron McClain – 16 rushes, 63 yards

Top receivers

- PIT – Santonio Holmes – 3 receptions, 61 yards, 1 TD
- BAL – Derrick Mason – 8 receptions, 137 yards

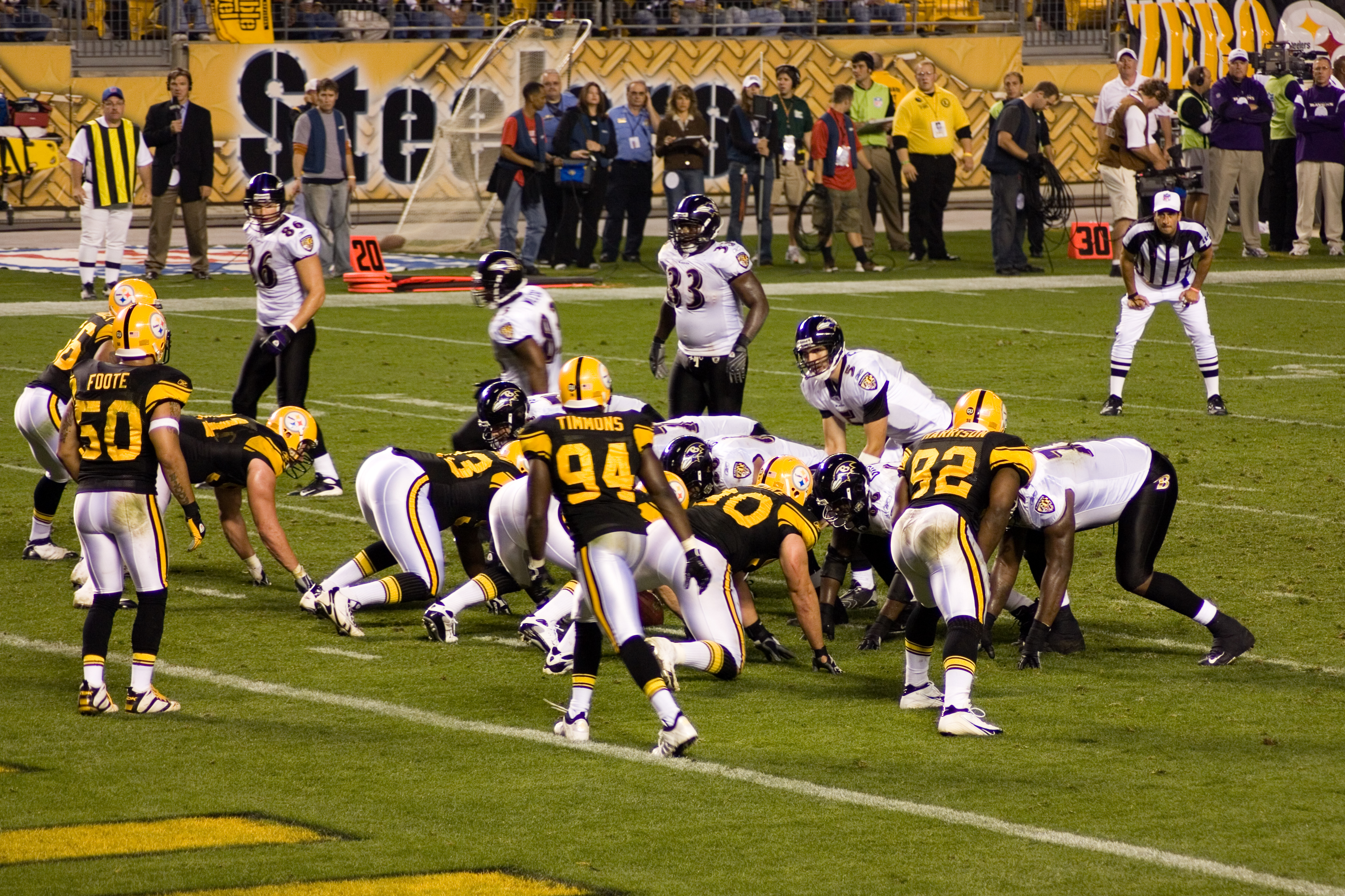
Ravens at Steelers Week 4

	1	2	3	4	OT	Total
Ravens	3	10	0	7	0	20
Steelers	3	0	14	3	3	23

Coming off their home win over the Browns, the Ravens flew to Heinz Field for their first road game of the year, as they played a Week 4 MNF duel with the throwback-clad Pittsburgh Steelers. In the first quarter, Baltimore trailed early as Steelers kicker Jeff Reed got a 49-yard field goal. The Ravens responded with kicker Matt Stover getting a 33-yard field goal. Baltimore gained the lead in the second quarter as Stover kicked a 20-yard field goal, while rookie quarterback Joe Flacco completed his first career touchdown pass as he hooked up with TE Daniel Wilcox from 4 yards out.

In the third quarter, Pittsburgh took the lead with quarterback Ben Roethlisberger completing a 38-yard TD pass to WR Santonio Holmes, along with LB James Harrison forcing a fumble from Flacco with LB LaMarr Woodley returning the fumble 7 yards for a touchdown. In the fourth quarter, the Steelers increased their lead with Reed getting a 19-yard field goal. Afterwards, the Ravens tied the game with RB Le'Ron McClain getting a 2-yard TD run. However, despite winning the coin toss in overtime, Baltimore was unable to gain ground. In the end, Pittsburgh sealed Baltimore's fate as Reed nailed the game-winning 46-yard field goal.

With the loss, the Ravens then fell to 2–1.

==== Week 5: vs. Tennessee Titans ====
Week Five: Tennessee Titans vs. Baltimore Ravens — Summary

- Game time: 1:00 PM EDT
- Game weather: 69 °F or 20.6 °C (Partly Cloudy)
- Referee: Bill Carollo

First quarter

- BAL – Stover 38-yard field goal 5:52

Second quarter

- TEN – Bironas 35-yard field goal 7:56

Third quarter

- BAL – McClain 1-yard run (Stover kick) 9:26

Fourth quarter

- TEN – Bironas 26-yard field goal 12:49
- TEN – Collins 11-yard pass to Crumpler (Bironas kick) 1:56
- Game attendance: 71,131 at M&T Bank Stadium in Baltimore, Maryland
- TV announcers: Ian Eagle & Solomon Wilcots
- Game coverage: CBS

Top passers

- BAL – Joe Flacco – 18/27, 153 yards, 2 INT
- TEN – Kerry Collins – 17/32, 163 yards, 1 TD, 2 INT

Top rushers

- BAL – Willis McGahee – 22 rushes, 64 yards
- TEN – Chris Johnson – 18 rushes, 44 yards

Top receivers

- BAL – Derrick Mason – 5 receptions, 38 yards
- TEN – Bo Scaife – 7 receptions, 72 yards

	1	2	3	4	Total
Titans	0	3	0	10	13
Ravens	3	0	7	0	10

Hoping to rebound from their tough divisional road loss to the Steelers, the Ravens went home for a Week 5 defensive duel with the Tennessee Titans. Baltimore scored in the first quarter on a 38-yard field goal by kicker Matt Stover. In the second quarter, the Titans tied the game as kicker Rob Bironas made a 35-yard field goal. In the third quarter, the Ravens reclaimed the lead on a 1-yard TD run by RB Le'Ron McClain. However, in the fourth quarter, Tennessee pulled away with Bironas nailing a 26-yard field goal and quarterback Kerry Collins completing an 11-yard TD pass to TE Alge Crumpler.

With the loss, Baltimore fell to 2–2.

==== Week 6: at Indianapolis Colts ====
Week Six: Baltimore Ravens vs. Indianapolis Colts — Summary

- Game time: 1:00 PM EDT
- Game weather: 75 °F or 23.9 °C (Sunny)
- Referee: Jerome Boger

First quarter

- IND – P. Manning 67-yard pass to Harrison (Vinatieri kick) 9:43
- IND – P. Manning 22-yard pass to Wayne (Vinatieri kick) 2:43
- IND – Vinatieri 37-yard field goal 0:38

Second quarter

- IND – P. Manning 5-yard pass to Harrison (Vinatieri kick) 1:48

Third quarter

- IND – Rhodes 1-yard run (Vinatieri kick) 9:25
- BAL – Stover 37-yard field goal 1:15
- Game attendance: at Lucas Oil Stadium in Indianapolis, Indiana
- TV announcers: Jim Nantz and Phil Simms
- Game coverage: CBS

Top passers

- IND – Peyton Manning – 19/28, 271 yards, 3 TD
- BAL – Joe Flacco – 28/38, 241 yards, 3 INT

Top rushers

- IND – Dominic Rhodes – 25 rushes, 73 yards, 1 TD
- BAL – Ray Rice – 6 rushes, 23 yards

Top receivers

- IND – Reggie Wayne – 8 receptions, 118 yards, 1 TD
- BAL – Derrick Mason – 6 receptions, 70 yards

	1	2	3	4	Total
Ravens	0	0	3	0	3
Colts	17	7	7	0	31

Trying to snap a two-game losing streak, the Ravens flew to Lucas Oil Stadium for a Week 6 duel with the Indianapolis Colts. In the first quarter, Baltimore trailed early as Colt quarterback Peyton Manning completed a 67-yard TD pass to WR Marvin Harrison and a 22-yard TD pass to WR Reggie Wayne, along with kicker Adam Vinatieri getting a 37-yard field goal. In the second quarter, the Ravens continued to struggle as Manning completed a 5-yard TD pass to Harrison. In the third quarter, Indianapolis pulled away as RB Dominic Rhodes got a 1-yard TD run. Baltimore would get its only score as kicker Matt Stover got a 37-yard field goal.

With their third-straight loss, the Ravens fell to 2–3.

==== Week 7: at Miami Dolphins ====
Week Seven: Baltimore Ravens vs. Miami Dolphins — Summary

- Game time: 1:00 PM EDT
- Game weather: 80 °F or 26.7 °C (Partly Cloudy)
- Referee: Bill Leavy

First quarter

- MIA – Carpenter 21-yard field goal 8:26
- BAL – Stover 47-yard field goal 1:36

Second quarter

- BAL – Terrell Suggs 44-yard interception return (Stover kick) 8:57
- MIA – Carpenter 26-yard field goal 4:36
- BAL – Joe Flacco 11-yard pass to Derrick Mason (Stover kick) 0:35

Third quarter

- BAL – Stover 28-yard field goal 8:36
- MIA – Chad Pennington 7-yard pass to Davone Bess (Carpenter kick) 5:01

Fourth quarter

- BAL – Willis McGahee 5-yard run (Stover kick) 6:34
- Game attendance: at Dolphin Stadium in Miami, Florida
- TV announcers: (CBS) Bill Macatee and Steve Beuerlein
- Game coverage:

Top passers

- MIA – Chad Pennington – 24/35, 295 yards, TD, INT
- BAL – Joe Flacco – 17/23, 232 yards, TD

Top rushers

- MIA – Ronnie Brown – 13 rushes, 27 yards
- BAL – Willis McGahee – 19 rushes, 105 yards, TD

Top receivers

- MIA – Greg Camarillo – 6 receptions, 74 yards
- BAL – Derrick Mason – 6 receptions, 87 yards, TD

	1	2	3	4	Total
Ravens	3	14	3	7	27
Dolphins	3	3	7	0	13

Trying to snap a three-game losing streak, the Ravens flew to Dolphin Stadium for a Week 7 duel with the Miami Dolphins. In the first quarter, Baltimore trailed early as Dolphins kicker Dan Carpenter got a 21-yard field goal. The Ravens would respond with kicker Matt Stover getting a 47-yard field goal. In the second quarter, Baltimore took the lead as LB Terrell Suggs returned an interception 44 yards for a touchdown. Miami would answer with Carpenter making a 26-yard field goal, yet the Ravens replied with rookie quarterback Joe Flacco completing an 11-yard TD pass to WR Derrick Mason.

In the third quarter, Baltimore increased its lead with Stover nailing a 28-yard field goal. The Dolphins tried to rally as quarterback Chad Pennington completed a 7-yard TD pass to WR Davone Bess. Fortunately for the Ravens, in the fourth quarter, the Ravens scored on a 5-yard TD run by RB Willis McGahee.

With the win, Baltimore improved to 3–3.

==== Week 8: vs. Oakland Raiders ====
Week Eight: Oakland Raiders vs. Baltimore Ravens — Summary

- Game time: 1:00 PM EDT
- Game weather: 65 °F or 18.3 °C (Sunny)
- Referee: Jeff Triplette

First quarter

- BAL – Russell sacked by McClain in the endzone for a safety 10:32

Second quarter

- BAL – Willis McGahee 1-yard run (Stover kick) 14:26
- BAL – Flacco 70-yard pass to Williams (Stover kick) 7:26
- BAL – Stover 38-yard field goal 0:10

Third quarter

- OAK – Janikowski 22-yard field goal 10:13
- BAL – Stover 30-yard field goal 3:18
- OAK – Russell 2-yard pass to Griffith (Janikowski kick) 0:36

Fourth quarter

- BAL – Flacco 12-yard run (Stover kick) 3:35
- Game attendance: 71,254 at M&T Bank Stadium in Baltimore, Maryland
- TV announcers: Ian Eagle and Solomon Wilcots
- Game coverage: NFL on CBS

Top passers

- BAL – Joe Flacco – 12/24, 140 yards, TD
- OAK – JaMarcus Russell – 15/33, 228 yards, TD, INT

Top rushers

- BAL – Ray Rice – 8 rushes, 64 yards
- OAK – Justin Fargas – 12 rushes, 24 yards

Top receivers

- BAL – Demetrius Williams – 1 reception, 70 yards, TD
- OAK – Chaz Schilens – 3 receptions, 76 yards

	1	2	3	4	Total
Raiders	0	0	10	0	10
Ravens	2	17	3	7	29

Coming off their road win over the Dolphins, the Ravens went home for a Week 8 duel with the Oakland Raiders. In the first quarter, Baltimore rookie LB Jameel McClain sacked Raiders quarterback JaMarcus Russell in his own endzone for a safety. In the second quarter, the Ravens increased their lead with a 1-yard TD run by RB Willis McGahee, a 70-yard TD pass to WR Demetrius Williams by rookie quarterback Joe Flacco, and a 38-yard field goal by kicker Matt Stover.

In the third quarter, Oakland responded with a 22-yard field goal by kicker Sebastian Janikowski, yet Baltimore answered with Stover 30-yard field goal. The Raiders tried to rally as Russell completed a 2-yard TD pass to RB Justin Griffith. In the fourth quarter, the Ravens extended their lead on a Flacco 12-yard TD run.

With the win, Baltimore improved to 4–3.

==== Week 9: at Cleveland Browns ====
Week Nine: Baltimore Ravens vs. Cleveland Browns — Summary

- Game time: 1:00 PM EST
- Game weather: 55 °F or 12.8 °C (Sunny)
- Referee: Scott Green

First quarter

- BAL – Stover 41-yard field goal 10:40
- BAL – Flacco 47-yard pass to Clayton (Stover kick) 5:19
- CLE – Cribbs 92-yard kickoff return (Dawson kick) 5:05

Second quarter

- CLE – Dawson 23-yard field goal 5:50
- BAL – Stover 32-yard field goal 0:29
- CLE – Dawson 54-yard field goal 0:03

Third quarter

- CLE – Anderson 28-yard pass to Edwards (Dawson kick) 13:05
- CLE – Anderson 7-yard pass to Wright (Dawson kick) 6:07
- BAL – McClain 1-yard run (Stover kick) 1:10

Fourth quarter

- BAL – Flacco 28-yard pass to Mason (Stover kick) 13:57
- BAL – Stover 22-yard field goal 5:36
- BAL – Suggs 42-yard interception return (Stover kick) 2:43
- Game attendance: 73,078 at Cleveland Municipal Stadium in Cleveland, Ohio
- TV announcers: Kevin Harlan and Rich Gannon
- Game coverage: NFL on CBS

Top passers

- CLE – Derek Anderson – 17/33, 219 yards, 2 TD, INT
- BAL – Joe Flacco – 17/29, 248 yards, 2 TD

Top rushers

- CLE – Jamal Lewis – 19 rushes, 49 yards
- BAL – Ray Rice – 21 rushes, 154 yards

Top receivers

- CLE – Braylon Edwards – 4 receptions, 86 yards, TD
- BAL – Derrick Mason – 9 receptions, 136 yards, TD

	1	2	3	4	Total
Ravens	10	3	7	17	37
Browns	7	6	14	0	27

Coming off their home win over the Raiders, the Ravens traveled to Cleveland Browns Stadium for a Week 9 AFC North rematch with the Cleveland Browns. In the first quarter, Baltimore's first drive ended with a 41-yard field goal by kicker Matt Stover, while rookie quarterback Joe Flacco completed a 47-yard TD pass to WR Mark Clayton. The Browns immediately responded with WR Joshua Cribbs returning a kickoff 92 yards for a touchdown. In the second quarter, Cleveland tied the game with a 23-yard field goal by kicker Phil Dawson. The Ravens answered with Stover making a 32-yard field goal, yet the Browns closed out the half with Dawson making a 54-yard field goal.

In the third quarter, Cleveland took the lead as quarterback Derek Anderson completed a 28-yard TD pass to WR Braylon Edwards and a 7-yard TD pass to RB Jason Wright. Baltimore closed out the quarter with a 1-yard TD run by FB Le'Ron McClain. In the fourth quarter, the Ravens rallied with Flacco completing a 28-yard TD pass to WR Derrick Mason, Stover nailing a 22-yard field goal, and LB Terrell Suggs returning an interception 42 yards for a touchdown.

With the season-sweep, Baltimore improved to 5–3.

==== Week 10: at Houston Texans ====
Week Ten: Baltimore Ravens vs. Houston Texans — Summary

- Game time: 1:00 PM EDT
- Game weather: 69 °F or 20.6 °C (Sunny)
- Referee: Jerome Boger

First quarter

- BAL – Flacco 43-yard pass to Figurs (Stover kick) 7:05

Second quarter

- HOU – Brown 23-yard field goal 6:48
- BAL – Penalty on Brown enforced in the end zone for a safety 4:01
- BAL – Hauschka 54-yard field goal 1:01
- HOU – Brown 48-yard field goal 0:00

Third quarter

- BAL – McGahee 1-yard run (Stover kick) 9:16
- HOU – Roenfels 60-yard pass to Walter (Brown kick) 3:01

Fourth quarter

- BAL – Flacco 1-yard pass to Heap (Flacco-Mason pass) 14:03
- BAL – Smith 14-yard pass to Heap (Stover kick) 6:29
- BAL – McGahee 4-yard run (Stover kick) 4:37
- Game attendance: at Reliant Stadium in Houston, Texas
- TV announcers: Ian Eagle and Solomon Wilcots
- Game coverage: NFL on CBS

Top passers

- BAL – Joe Flacco – 15/23, 185 yards, 2 TD
- HOU – Sage Rosenfels – 23/38, 294 yards, TD, 4 INT

Top rushers

- BAL – Willis McGahee – 25 rushes, 112 yards, 2 TD
- HOU – Ryan Moats – 7 rushes, 34 yards

Top receivers

- BAL – Todd Heap – 5 receptions, 58 yards, 2 TD
- HOU – Kevin Walter – 4 receptions, 85 yards, TD

	1	2	3	4	Total
Ravens	7	5	7	22	41
Texans	0	6	7	0	13

Coming off their season-sweep over the Browns, the Ravens flew to Reliant Stadium for a Week 10 duel with the Houston Texans. Both Baltimore and Houston were originally scheduled to play each other during Week 2 of the 2008 NFL season, but the game was rescheduled to Week 10 due to structural damage to Reliant Stadium, which was caused by Hurricane Ike. Week 10 was originally set to be the team's bye week. This contest would be the eighth of a record fifteen consecutive games for the Ravens.

In the first quarter, Baltimore took flight as rookie quarterback Joe Flacco completed a 43-yard TD pass to WR Yamon Figurs. In the second quarter, the Texans responded with a 23-yard field goal by kicker Kris Brown. The Ravens would punt on the ensuing drive, pinning the Texans at their 3-yard line. On the next play, Texans OT Duane Brown committed a holding penalty while in his own endzone, giving the Ravens a safety. Baltimore would increase their lead as rookie kicker Steven Hauschka got a 54-yard field goal. The Texans would close out the half as Brown nailed a 48-yard field goal.

In the third quarter, the Ravens increased their lead as RB Willis McGahee got a 1-yard TD run. Houston would answer as quarterback Sage Rosenfels completed a 60-yard TD pass to WR Kevin Walter. In the fourth quarter, Baltimore steamrolled their way to victory with Flacco completing a 1-yard TD pass to TE Todd Heap (with a two-point conversion pass to WR Derrick Mason), QB Troy Smith completing a 14-yard TD pass to Heap, and McGahee rushing four yards for a TD.

With the win, the Ravens improved to 6–3.

==== Week 11: at New York Giants ====
Week Eleven: Baltimore Ravens vs. New York Giants — Summary

- Game time: 1:00 PM EST
- Game weather: 49 °F or 9.4 °C (Cloudy)
- Referee: Ron Winter

First quarter

- NYG – Jacobs 1-yard run (Tynes kick) 8:45
- NYG – Jacobs 1-yard run (kick failed) 0:19

Second quarter

- NYG – E. Manning 1-yard pass to Johnson (Tynes kick) 7:14
- BAL – Stover 38-yard field goal 4:08

Third quarter

- BAL – Flacco 10-yard pass to McClain (Stover kick) 4:26
- NYG – Ross 50-yard interception return (Tynes kick) 0:14

Fourth quarter

- NYG – Tynes 19-yard field goal 12:02
- Game attendance: 78,849 at Giants Stadium in East Rutherford, New Jersey
- TV announcers: Greg Gumbel and Dan Dierdorf
- Game coverage: NFL on CBS

Top passers

- NYG – Eli Manning – 13/23, 153 yards, TD, INT
- BAL – Joe Flacco – 20/33, 164 yards, TD, INT

Top rushers

- NYG – Ahmad Bradshaw – 9 rushes, 96 yards
- BAL – Joe Flacco – 6 rushes, 57 yards

Top receivers

- NYG – Derrick Ward – 4 receptions, 54 yards
- BAL – Derrick Mason – 7 receptions, 82 yards

	1	2	3	4	Total
Ravens	0	3	7	0	10
Giants	13	7	7	3	30

Coming off their road win over the Texans, the Ravens flew to Giants Stadium for a Week 11 interconference duel with the defending Super Bowl champions, the New York Giants. In the first quarter, Baltimore trailed early as Giants RB Brandon Jacobs got back-to-back 1-yard TD runs (with a failed PAT on the latter). In the second quarter, the Ravens continued to struggle as quarterback Eli Manning completed a 1-yard TD pass to TE Darcy Johnson. Baltimore closed out the half with kicker Matt Stover getting a 38-yard field goal.

In the third quarter, the Ravens tried to rally as rookie quarterback Joe Flacco completed a 10-yard TD pass to FB Le'Ron McClain. However, New York answered with CB Aaron Ross returning an interception 50 yards for a touchdown. In the fourth quarter, the Giants closed out the game as kicker Lawrence Tynes nailed a 19-yard field goal.

With the loss, Baltimore fell to 6–4.

The Ravens' top-ranked rushing defense gave up 207 yards, which is the most since October 1997 against the Pittsburgh Steelers.

==== Week 12: vs. Philadelphia Eagles ====
Week Twelve: Philadelphia Eagles (5–4–1) at Baltimore Ravens (6–4)

Quarter	1	2	3	4	Total
Eagles	0	7	0	0	7
Ravens	0	10	2	24	36

at M&T Bank Stadium, Baltimore, Maryland

- Date: November 23, 2008
- Game time: 1:00 p.m. EST
- Game weather: Sunny, 39 °F or 3.9 °C
- Game attendance: 71,379
- Referee: Walt Anderson
- TV announcers (Fox): Sam Rosen, Tim Ryan and Chris Myers
- Recap

Game information

First quarter

- No scoring plays.

Second quarter

- BAL – Matt Stover 44-yard field goal, 3:00. Ravens 3–0. Drive: 4 plays, 2 yards, 1:30.
- BAL – Daniel Wilcox 1-yard pass from Joe Flacco (Matt Stover kick), 1:49. Ravens 10–0. Drive: 3 plays, 6 yards, 0:49.
- PHI – Quintin Demps 100-yard kickoff return (David Akers kick), 1:37. Ravens 10–7.

Third quarter

- BAL – Jameel McClain blocked punt out of end zone for a safety, 6:01. Ravens 12–7.

Fourth quarter

- BAL – Matt Stover 42-yard field goal, 14:52. Ravens 15–7. Drive: 6 plays, 27 yards, 2:25.
- BAL – Mark Clayton 53-yard pass from Joe Flacco (Matt Stover kick), 11:30. Ravens 22–7. Drive: 3 plays, 60 yards, 1:36.
- BAL – Ed Reed 107-yard interception return (Matt Stover kick), 7:24. Ravens 29–7.
- BAL – Le'Ron McClain 1-yard run (Matt Stover kick), 3:10. Ravens 36–7. Drive: 5 plays, 36 yards, 3:06.

Top passers

- PHI – Kevin Kolb – 10/23, 73 yards, 2 INT
- BAL – Joe Flacco – 12/26, 183 yards, 2 TD

Top rushers

- PHI – Brian Westbrook – 14 rushes, 39 yards
- BAL – Le'Ron McClain – 18 rushes, 88 yards, TD

Top receivers

- PHI – DeSean Jackson – 5 receptions, 47 yards
- BAL – Mark Clayton – 2 receptions, 76 yards, TD

Hoping to rebound from their road loss to the Giants, the Ravens went home for a Week 12 interconference duel with the Philadelphia Eagles. Baltimore scored the first points of the game late in the second half with a 44-yard field goal by kicker Matt Stover, while rookie quarterback Joe Flacco and TE Daniel Wilcox connected on a 1-yard TD pass, set up by an interception by safety Ed Reed. The Eagles would close out the half with safety Quintin Demps returning a kickoff 100 yards for a touchdown. In the third quarter, the Ravens answered with rookie LB Jameel McClain blocking a punt that resulted in a safety. In the fourth quarter, Baltimore scored additional unanswered points as Stover nailed a 42-yard field goal, Flacco completed a 53-yard TD pass to WR Mark Clayton, Reed set an NFL record with a 107-yard interception return for a touchdown, and FB Le'Ron McClain scored on a 1-yard TD run. This was John Harbaugh's first game against his previous team. He was the Eagles' special teams coordinator from 1998 to 2006, and the Eagles' defensive backs coach in 2007.

With the win, the Ravens improved to 7–4.

==== Week 13: at Cincinnati Bengals ====
Week Thirteen: Baltimore Ravens vs. Cincinnati Bengals — Summary

- Game time: 1:00 PM EST
- Game weather: 42 °F or 5.6 °C (Cloudy with Showers)
- Referee: Carl Cheffers

First quarter

- BAL- Stover 27-yard field goal 6:06

Second quarter

- BAL- Stover 21-yard field goal 12:52
- BAL- Flacco 4-yard pass to Heap (Stover kick) 3:06
- CIN- Graham 21-yard field goal 0:00

Third quarter

- BAL- Clayton 32-yard pass to Mason (Stover kick) 8:12
- BAL- Flacco 70-yard pass to Clayton (Stover kick) 5:53

Fourth quarter

- BAL- Leonhard 35-yard interception return (Stover kick) 2:28
- Game attendance: at Paul Brown Stadium in Cincinnati, Ohio
- TV announcers: (CBS) Ian Eagle and Solomon Wilcots
- Game coverage:

Top passers

- CIN – Ryan Fitzpatrick 12/31, 124 yards
- BAL – Joe Flacco 19/29, 280 yards, 2 TD

Top rushers

- CIN – Ryan Fitzpatrick 3 rushes, 29 yards
- BAL – Le'Ron McClain 25 rushes, 86 yards

Top receivers

- CIN – T. J. Houshmandzadeh 4 receptions, 64 yards
- BAL – Mark Clayton 5 receptions, 164 yards, TD

	1	2	3	4	Total
Ravens	3	10	14	7	34
Bengals	0	3	0	0	3

Coming off their home win over the Eagles, the Ravens flew to Paul Brown Stadium for a Week 13 AFC North rematch with the Cincinnati Bengals. In the first quarter, Baltimore scored first with a 27-yard field goal by kicker Matt Stover. In the second quarter, the Ravens increased their lead as Stover made a 21-yard field goal, while rookie quarterback Joe Flacco completed a 4-yard TD pass to TE Todd Heap. The Bengals would close out the half as kicker Shayne Graham nailed a 21-yard field goal.

In the third quarter, Baltimore pulled away as WR Mark Clayton (on a trick play) threw a 32-yard TD pass to WR Derrick Mason and caught a 70-yard TD pass from Flacco. In the fourth quarter, the Ravens sealed the victory as safety Jim Leonhard returned an interception 35 yards for a touchdown.

With the win, not only did Baltimore improve to 8–4, but they swept the season series from Cincinnati for the first time since 2002.

==== Week 14: vs. Washington Redskins ====
Week Fourteen: Washington Redskins vs. Baltimore Ravens — Summary

- Game time: 8:15 PM EST
- Game weather:
- Referee: Terry McAulay

First quarter

- BAL – Le'Ron McClain 8-yard run (Matt Stover kick). Ravens 7–0.
- BAL – Ed Reed 22-yard fumble return (Matt Stover kick). Ravens 14–0.

Second quarter

- No scoring plays.

Third quarter

- BAL – Matt Stover 32-yard field goal. Ravens 17–0.

Fourth quarter

- WAS – Shaun Suisham 43-yard field goal. Ravens 17–3.
- WAS – Antwaan Randle El 5-yard pass from Jason Campbell (Shaun Suisham kick). Ravens 17–10.
- BAL – Derrick Mason 28-yard pass from Joe Flacco (Matt Stover kick). Ravens 24–10.
- Game attendance: at M&T Bank Stadium in Baltimore, Maryland
- TV announcers: (NBC) Al Michaels and John Madden
- Game coverage:

Top passers

- BAL – Joe Flacco – 10/21, 134 yards, TD, INT
- WAS – Jason Campbell – 21/37, 218 yards, TD, 2 INT

Top rushers

- BAL – Le'Ron McClain – 20 rushes, 61 yards
- WAS – Clinton Portis – 11 rushes, 32 yards

Top receivers

- BAL – Derrick Mason – 3 receptions, 60 yards, TD
- WAS – Ladell Betts – 3 receptions, 57 yards

	1	2	3	4	Total
Redskins	0	0	0	10	10
Ravens	14	0	3	7	24

The Ravens wore their alternate uniforms in the game, hosting cross-conference rivals The Washington Redskins at M&T Bank Stadium. The Ravens scored early following an Ed Reed interception that set up a short touchdown pass from Joe Flacco to Le'Ron McClain. With just under ten minutes to go, Washington ran Clinton Portis up the middle for a first down, but Portis fumbled. Raven Ed Reed recovered the ball and advanced it for a touchdown; the Redskins unsuccessfully challenged, contending Portis was down by contact. Those would be the only points on the board for either team in the first half.

In the second half, a long Ravens drive beginning at just under eleven minutes to go in the third quarter set up a 32-yard Matt Stover field goal. The Redskins answered with a drive starting late in the third quarter and ending in the early fourth quarter that set up a 43-yard Shaun Suisham field goal. Receiving the kickoff, Baltimore ran just two plays before surrendering the ball to Washington on a Willis McGahee fumble that led to a short drive capped by a touchdown pass from Jason Campbell to Antwaan Randle El. Another kickoff led to a very long Baltimore drive that consumed most of the remaining time. Ten of twelve plays were runs by Le'Ron McClain. A 28-yard touchdown pass to Derrick Mason capped this drive. With three and a half minutes left, the Redskins next drive ended in an Ed Reed interception that enabled Baltimore to burn most of the remaining time. The Redskins took possession for their final series with 0:16 remaining but could not score.

With the win, Baltimore improved to 9–4.

==== Week 15: vs. Pittsburgh Steelers ====
Week Fifteen: Pittsburgh Steelers vs. Baltimore Ravens — Summary

- Game time: 4:15 PM EST
- Game weather:
- Referee: Walt Coleman

Second quarter

- BAL – Stover 28-yard field goal 12:30
- PIT – Reed 31-yard field goal 5:44
- BAL – Stover 26-yard field goal 0:49

Third quarter

- BAL – Stover 28-yard field goal 6:02

Fourth quarter

- PIT – Reed 30-yard field goal 9:26
- PIT – Roethlisberger 4-yard pass to Holmes (J. Reed kick) 0:43
- Game attendance: at M&T Bank Stadium in Baltimore, Maryland
- TV announcers: (CBS) Jim Nantz and Phil Simms
- Game coverage:

Top passers

- BAL – Joe Flacco – 11/28, 115 yards, 2 INT
- PIT – Ben Roethlisberger – 22/40, 246 yards, TD

Top rushers

- BAL – Le'Ron McClain – 23 rushes, 87 yards
- PIT – Willie Parker – 14 rushes, 47 yards

Top receivers

- BAL – Mark Clayton – 3 receptions, 38 yards
- PIT – Hines Ward – 8 receptions, 107 yards

	1	2	3	4	Total
Steelers	0	3	0	10	13
Ravens	0	6	3	0	9

Coming off their win over the Redskins, the Ravens stayed at home for a crucial Week 15 AFC North rematch with the Pittsburgh Steelers with the division title on the line.

After a scoreless first quarter, Baltimore scored in the second quarter with a 28-yard field goal by kicker Matt Stover. The Steelers would respond with a 31-yard field goal from kicker Jeff Reed, yet the Ravens gained the halftime lead as Stover kicked a 26-yard field goal. Baltimore would increase their lead in the third quarter as Stover made a 28-yard field goal. However, in the fourth quarter, Pittsburgh would win the game as Reed nailed a 30-yard field goal, followed by quarterback Ben Roethlisberger completing a 4-yard touchdown pass to wide receiver Santonio Holmes.

With the loss, the Ravens fell to 9–5 being swept by the Steelers for the first time since 2002.

==== Week 16: at Dallas Cowboys ====
Week Sixteen: Baltimore Ravens vs. Dallas Cowboys — Summary

- Game time: 8:15 PM EST
- Game weather: 45 °F or 7.2 °C (Clear)
- Referee: Ed Hochuli

First quarter

- DAL – Choice 2-yard run (Folk kick) 11:05
- BAL – Stover 26-yard field goal 6:14

Second quarter

- BAL – Stover 29-yard field goal 10:54
- BAL – Stover 37-yard field goal 0:00

Third quarter

- BAL – Flacco 13-yard pass to Mason (Stover kick)

Fourth quarter

- DAL – Folk 35-yard field goal 11:28
- BAL – Stover 37-yard field goal 6:30
- DAL – Romo 7-yard pass to Owens (Folk kick) 3:50
- BAL – McGahee 77-yard run (Stover kick) 3:32
- DAL – Romo 21-yard pass to Witten (Folk kick) 1:36
- BAL – McClain 82-yard run (Stover kick) 1:18
- Game attendance: 63,800 at Texas Stadium in Irving, Texas
- TV announcers: (NFL Network) Bob Papa, Deion Sanders, & Marshall Faulk
- Game coverage:

Top passers

- DAL – Tony Romo – 24/45, 252 yards, 2 TD, 2 INT
- BAL – Joe Flacco – 17/25, 149 yards, TD

Top rushers

- DAL – Tashard Choice – 17 rushes, 90 yards, TD
- BAL – Le'Ron McClain – 22 rushes, 139 yards, TD

Top receivers

- DAL – Jason Witten – 5 receptions, 87 yards, TD
- BAL – Derrick Mason – 6 receptions, 66 yards, TD

	1	2	3	4	Total
Ravens	3	6	7	17	33
Cowboys	7	0	0	17	24

Hoping to rebound from an upsetting home loss to the Steelers, the Ravens flew to Texas Stadium for a Week 16 interconference duel with the Dallas Cowboys. Baltimore would trail early in the first quarter as Cowboys running back Tashard Choice got a 2-yard touchdown run. The Ravens would respond with a 26-yard field goal from kicker Matt Stover. In the second quarter, Baltimore would take the lead as Stover made a 29-yard and a 37-yard field goal. The Ravens would then use the third quarter to add onto their lead as rookie quarterback Joe Flacco completed a 13-yard touchdown pass to wide receiver Derrick Mason. In the fourth quarter, Dallas would answer with kicker Nick Folk getting a 35-yard field goal, yet Baltimore equally answered with Stover's 35-yard field goal. The Cowboys would try to rally as quarterback Tony Romo completed a 7-yard touchdown pass to wide receiver Terrell Owens, yet the Ravens immediately responded with running back Willis McGahee scoring on a 77-yard touchdown run. Dallas tried to come back as Romo completed a 21-yard touchdown pass to tight end Jason Witten, yet Baltimore closed out the game with fullback Le'Ron McClain rushing for an 82-yard touchdown (the longest TD run by a Cowboys opponent in Texas Stadium).

With the win, the Ravens kept their playoff hopes alive at 10–5.

==== Week 17: vs. Jacksonville Jaguars ====
Week Seventeen: Jacksonville Jaguars vs. Baltimore Ravens — Summary

- Game time: 4:15 PM EST
- Game weather: 62 °F or 16.7 °C (Cloudy)
- Referee: Alberto Riveron

First quarter

- BAL – Stover 32-yard field goal 9:25
- JAC – Garrard 23-yard pass to Pearman (Scobee kick) 0:48

Second quarter

- BAL – McClain 5-yard run (Stover kick) 10:58
- BAL – McGahee 13-yard run (Stover kick) 4:52
- BAL – McClain 1-yard run (Stover kick) 0:44

Third quarter

- BAL – Stover 41-yard field goal 3:26
- Game attendance: at M&T Bank Stadium in Baltimore, Maryland
- TV announcers: (CBS) Dick Enberg and Randy Cross
- Game coverage:

Top passers

- BAL – Joe Flacco – 17/23, 297 yards
- JAX – David Garrard – 14/25, 127 yards, TD, 2 INT

Top rushers

- BAL – Le'Ron McClain – 25 rushes, 70 yards, 2 TD
- JAX – Maurice Jones-Drew – 23 rushes, 78 yards

Top receivers

- BAL – Mark Clayton – 4 receptions, 128 yards
- JAX – Dennis Northcutt – 5 receptions, 35 yards

	1	2	3	4	Total
Jaguars	7	0	0	0	7
Ravens	3	21	3	0	27

With the New England Patriots leading the Buffalo Bills 13–0 late in the fourth quarter of their game, the Ravens knew at kick-off that the only sure way to secure the final AFC play-off berth would be to beat the Jaguars. The Ravens tallied 3 points on an opening drive that featured a 48-yard pass completion from Joe Flacco to Mark Clayton. With 55 seconds remaining in the 1st quarter, the Jaguars answered with a David Garrard pass to Alvin Pearman for 23-yard touchdown. The Ravens running game dominated the second quarter with Le'Ron McClain scoring two touchdowns and Willis McGahee adding a third. The Ravens defense, featuring a Ray Lewis fumble recovery and an Ed Reed interception, shutout the Jaguars the rest of the game with Matt Stover adding a second-half field goal.

With the win, the Ravens completed the regular season at 11–5 and secured the sixth and final playoff spot in the AFC. They traveled to Miami, Florida to play the AFC East division champion Miami Dolphins.

=== Postseason ===
Week	Date	Opponent	Result	Record	Venue	Game recap
Wild Card Round	January 4, 2009	at Miami Dolphins	W 27–9	1–0	Dolphin Stadium	
Divisional Round	January 10, 2009	at Tennessee Titans	W 13–10	2–0	LP Field	
AFC Championship	January 18, 2009	at Pittsburgh Steelers	L 14–23	2–1	Heinz Field	

==== AFC Wild Card Round: at Miami Dolphins ====
AFC Wild Card Round: Baltimore Ravens vs. Miami Dolphins — Summary

- Game time: 1:00 PM EDT
- Game weather: 79 °F (26 °C) (Cloudy)
- Referee: Ed Hochuli

First quarter

- MIA – Carpenter 19-yard field goal 8:17
- BAL – Stover 23-yard field goal 2:47

Second quarter

- BAL – Reed 64-yard interception return (Stover kick) 2:30
- BAL – Stover 31-yard field goal 0:16

Third quarter

- BAL – McClain 8-yard run (Stover kick) 7:33

Fourth quarter

- MIA – Pennington 2-yard pass to Brown (kick blocked) 13:09
- BAL – Flacco 5-yard run (Stover kick) 3:53
- Game attendance: 74,240 at Dolphin Stadium in Miami, Florida
- TV announcers: (CBS) Jim Nantz and Phil Simms
- Game coverage:

Top passers

- MIA – Chad Pennington – 25/38, 252 yards, TD, 4 INT
- BAL – Joe Flacco – 9/23, 135 yards

Top rushers

- MIA – Ronnie Brown – 12 rushes, 19 yards
- BAL – Le'Ron McClain – 19 rushes, 75 yards, TD

Top receivers

- MIA – Patrick Cobbs – 4 receptions, 55 yards
- BAL – Derrick Mason – 4 receptions, 71 yards

	1	2	3	4	Total
Ravens	3	10	7	7	27
Dolphins	3	0	0	6	9

Entering the postseason as the AFC's sixth seed, the Ravens began their playoff run at Dolphin Stadium in the AFC Wild Card round against the #3 Miami Dolphins, a rematch of their game played during Week 7 of the 2008 season. Baltimore trailed early in the first quarter as Dolphins kicker Dan Carpenter hit a 19-yard field goal. The Ravens responded with 2:52 left in the first quarter when Matt Stover drove a ball through the uprights from 23-yards. In the second quarter, Baltimore took the lead when safety Ed Reed intercepted a Chad Pennington pass and returned it 64 yards for a touchdown. Stover nailed a 31-yard field goal after quarterback Joe Flacco hit Derrick Mason with a 31-yard bomb.

In the third quarter, the Ravens increased their lead as running back Le'Ron McClain got an 8-yard touchdown run. Miami tried to rally in the fourth quarter as quarterback Chad Pennington completed a 2-yard touchdown pass to running back Ronnie Brown. With 4:00 left, the Ravens shut the door when Flacco scooted 5 yards on a quarterback draw for a touchdown.

With the win, the Ravens improved their overall record to 12–5 and traveled to Nashville to play the Tennessee Titans in the divisional round of the play-offs.

Baltimore's defense forced five turnovers from a Dolphins squad that only committed 13 turnovers throughout the entire regular season.

==== AFC Divisional Round: at Tennessee Titans ====
AFC Divisional Round: Baltimore Ravens vs. Tennessee Titans — Summary

- Game time: 4:30 PM EDT
- Game weather: 53 °F (12 °C) (Cloudy)
- Referee: Terry McAulay

First quarter

- TEN – Johnson 8-yard run (Bironas kick) 4:38
- BAL – Flacco 48-yard pass to Mason (Stover kick) 1:20

Second quarter No Scoring

Third quarter No Scoring

Fourth quarter

- BAL – Stover 21-yard field goal 14:10
- TEN – Bironas 27-yard field goal 4:23
- BAL – Stover 43-yard field goal 0:53
- Game attendance: 69,143 at LP Field in Nashville, Tennessee
- TV announcers: (CBS) Greg Gumbel and Dan Dierdorf
- Game coverage:

Top passers

- TEN – Kerry Collins – 26/42, 281 yards, INT
- BAL – Joe Flacco – 11/22, 161 yards, TD

Top rushers

- TEN – Chris Johnson – 11 rushes, 72 yards, TD
- BAL – Willis McGahee – 12 rushes, 32 yards

Top receivers

- TEN – Justin Gage – 10 receptions, 135 yards
- BAL – Derrick Mason – 5 receptions, 78 yards, TD

	1	2	3	4	Total
Ravens	7	0	0	6	13
Titans	7	0	0	3	10

Coming off their wild card road win over the Dolphins, the Ravens flew to LP Field for their AFC Divisional showdown with the top-seeded Tennessee Titans, in an attempt to avenge their Week 5 loss. The Titans struck first with 4:45 remaining in the 1st quarter, with running back Chris Johnson capping off a 65-yard drive with an 8-yard touchdown run. The Ravens responded with an 80-yard drive, ending with a 48-yard touchdown pass from rookie quarterback Joe Flacco to wide receiver Derrick Mason. The Ravens were then held to 87 net total yards in the 2nd and 3rd quarters. The Titans drove inside the Ravens 30-yard line three times in the 2nd quarter, but couldn't score. Their first drive ended on downs after Kerry Collins fumbled the snapped on 4th down and 8 from the Ravens 30-yard line. The second drive ended with an interception by Samari Rolle at the Ravens 9-yard line. Right before halftime, LenDale White fumbled at Ravens 17-yard line with the recovery made by Jim Leonhard. Rob Bironas also missed a 51-yard field goal in the 3rd quarter. Early in the 4th quarter, following a long pass completion to the Ravens 4-yard line by Mark Clayton from Joe Flacco, Baltimore kicker Matt Stover kicked a 21-yard field goal, which gave the Ravens a 10–7 lead. Tennessee would try to respond, by going 10 plays and using up 5 minutes of clock to drive down inside the Ravens 10-yard line, but Collin's pass to Crumpler was fumbled and recovered by Ravens' cornerback Fabian Washington at the Ravens 1. This was the third turnover of the game for the Titans. Unable to move the ball, the Ravens punted the ball back to the Titans. From the Ravens 42, Tennessee drove down inside the 10-yard line again, but settled for a 27-yard field goal from kicker Rob Bironas to tie the game at 10–10. With 4:17 left in the game, the Ravens started a drive from their own 26-yard line. On a crucial 3rd down and 2, Flacco completed a 23-yard pass to tight end Todd Heap, although the officials missed that play clock had run out prior to the snap. The drive ended with Stover kicking a 43-yard field goal to give the Ravens the lead with :57 remaining in the game. The Ravens' defense then held, turning the Titans over on downs with :12 to go, preserving the victory.

With the win, not only did Baltimore improve their overall record to 13–5, but they also advanced to the AFC Championship Game against their AFC North Rival, the Pittsburgh Steelers. Joe Flacco also became the first quarterback in NFL history to win two playoff games in his rookie year.

==== AFC Championship Round: at Pittsburgh Steelers ====
AFC Championship Round: Baltimore Ravens vs. Pittsburgh Steelers — Summary

- Game time: 6:30 PM EDT
- Game weather: 26 °F (−3 °C) (Cloudy)
- Referee: Bill Carollo

First quarter

- PIT – Reed 34-yard field goal 11:22
- PIT – Reed 42-yard field goal 6:11

Second quarter

- PIT – Roethlisberger 65-yard pass to Holmes (Reed kick) 13:58
- BAL – McGahee 3-yard run (Stover kick) 2:40

Third quarter

- PIT – Reed 46-yard field goal 3:38

Fourth quarter

- BAL – McGahee 1-yard run (Stover kick) 9:29
- PIT – Polamalu 40-yard interception return (Reed kick) 4:24
- Game attendance: at Heinz Field in Pittsburgh, Pennsylvania
- TV announcers (CBS): Jim Nantz, Phil Simms, & Steve Tasker
- Game coverage:

Top passers

- PIT – Ben Roethlisberger – 16/33, 255 yards, TD
- BAL – Joe Flacco – 13/30, 141 yards, 3 INT

Top rushers

- PIT – Willie Parker – 24 rushes, 47 yards
- BAL – Willis McGahee – 20 rushes, 60 yards, TD

Top receivers

- PIT – Santonio Holmes – 2 receptions, 70 yards, TD
- BAL – Ray Rice – 3 receptions, 43 yards

	1	2	3	4	Total
Ravens	0	7	0	7	14
Steelers	6	7	3	7	23

Coming off their road win over the top-seeded Titans, the Ravens flew to Heinz Field for the AFC Championship Game against their hated divisional rival, the #2 Pittsburgh Steelers (in Round 3 of their 2008 series).

Baltimore would trail early in the first quarter as Steelers kicker Jeff Reed kicked a 34-yard and a 42-yard field goal. Pittsburgh would add onto their lead in the second quarter as quarterback Ben Roethlisberger completed a 65-yard touchdown pass to wide receiver Santonio Holmes. The Ravens would close out the half as running back Willis McGahee scored a touchdown on a 3-yard run.

In the third quarter, the Steelers would respond to Baltimore's score with Reed nailing a 46-yard field goal. The Ravens would creep closer as McGahee rushed for a 1-yard touchdown. However, in the fourth quarter, Pittsburgh pulled away as safety Troy Polamalu returned an interception 40 yards for a touchdown. Baltimore tried to mount a comeback, but the Steelers' defense was too much to overcome.

With the loss, the Ravens' season ended with an overall record of 13–6.

McGahee, near the end of the fourth quarter, was in a vicious collision with Pittsburgh safety Ryan Clark. He was conscious, yet had to be carted off the field, due to some neck pains. On January 19, 2009, the Ravens released news that McGahee is expected to make a full recovery.
