= Willis McGahee =

American football player (born 1981)

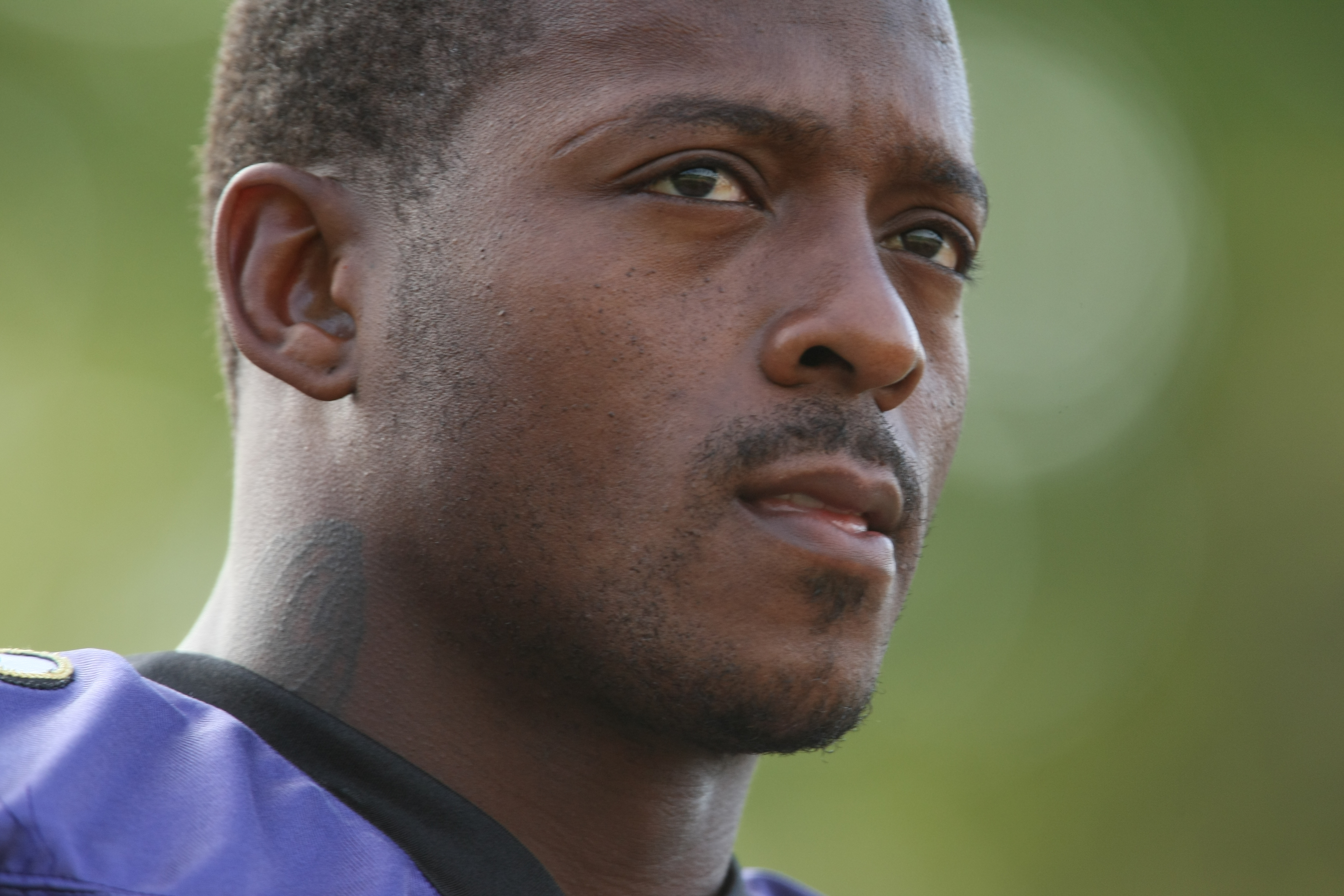
- McGahee with the Baltimore Ravens in 2009

No. 21, 23, 26
- Position: Running back

Personal information
- Born: October 21, 1981 (age 45); Miami, Florida, U.S.
- Listed height: 6 ft 0 in (1.83 m)
- Listed weight: 235 lb (107 kg)

Career information
- High school: Miami Central (West Little River, Florida)
- College: Miami (FL) (2000–2002)
- NFL draft: 2003: 1st round, 23rd overall pick

Career history
- Buffalo Bills (2003–2006); Baltimore Ravens (2007–2010); Denver Broncos (2011–2012); Cleveland Browns (2013)

Awards and highlights
- PFWA NFL Comeback Player of the Year (2004); 2× Pro Bowl (2007, 2011); BCS national champion (2001); Big East Offensive Player of the Year (2002); Consensus All-American (2002); First-team All-Big East (2002)

Career NFL statistics
- Rushing attempts: 2,095
- Rushing yards: 8,474
- Rushing touchdowns: 65
- Receptions: 210
- Receiving yards: 1,339
- Receiving touchdowns: 5
- Stats at Pro Football Reference

Willis Andrew McGahee III (born October 21, 1981) is an American former professional football player who was a running back in the National Football League (NFL). He played college football for the Miami Hurricanes, earning consensus All-American honors in 2002. McGahee was selected by the Buffalo Bills in the first round of the 2003 NFL draft. In addition to his time with the Bills, he played for the Baltimore Ravens, Denver Broncos, and Cleveland Browns.

In 2015, McGahee signed on as an athlete for the Miami Surge of the National Pro Grid League.

== Early life ==
McGahee was born in Miami, Florida. He attended Miami Central High School for one year after transferring from Miami Springs High School, where he previously attended for three years.

== College career ==
McGahee received an athletic scholarship to attend the University of Miami, where he played for coach Butch Davis and coach Larry Coker's Miami Hurricanes football teams from 2000 to 2002.

McGahee was a member of the 2001 University of Miami team, which won the National Championship over Nebraska in the 2002 Rose Bowl that year.

In 2002, McGahee, along with Ken Dorsey, Andre Johnson, Kellen Winslow II, and others helped lead Miami to an undefeated regular season and a #1 ranking, which included a trip to the National Championship game against second ranked Ohio State. On December 7 against Virginia Tech, he had 39 carries for 205 yards and six rushing touchdowns in the win. His six touchdowns were a Big East record. McGahee broke several records in the 2002 season. He shattered school season records, carrying the ball 282 times for 1,753 yards, for a 6.2 average, and 28 touchdowns. Only UCF's Kevin Smith (29 in 2007), Florida Atlantic's Devin Singletary (32 in 2017), Nebraska's Mike Rozier (29 in 1983), Colorado State's Kapri Bibbs (31 in 2013), Wisconsin's Montee Ball (33 in 2011), and Oklahoma State's Barry Sanders (37 in 1988) ran for more touchdowns in an NCAA Division I-A season. Following his 2002 sophomore season, he was a first-team All-Big east selection and was recognized as a consensus first-team All-American. McGahee's ten 100-yard performances broke the Hurricanes' season record of eight, set by Ottis Anderson in 1978; he added 355 yards on 25 receptions, for a 14.2 average, that season. He gained 2,108 all-purpose yards during 2002, which remains a Hurricanes' season record. He was a finalist for the Heisman Trophy, given to the nation's top player, finishing fourth in the voting (660 votes), while teammate Ken Dorsey finished fifth with 643 votes.

In the early part of the fourth quarter during the 2003 Fiesta Bowl National Championship Game, McGahee suffered an injury after catching a screen pass from Dorsey. He was immediately hit by Buckeye safety Will Allen, turning his left knee into a swivel joint and causing tears of the ACL, PCL, and MCL. Prior to getting hurt, he had rushed for 67 yards and a touchdown, as Miami would lose the game in double-overtime, 31–24. This injury required several surgeries and extensive rehabilitation before he would be able to play again. At the season's end, McGahee announced he would not collect on a $2.5 million insurance policy he had taken out before the Championship game, and therefore would enter the 2003 NFL draft.

At the conclusion of his collegiate career, he had rushed for 2,067 yards and 31 touchdowns. He majored in criminology while at the University of Miami.

== Professional career ==
=== Pre-draft ===
Pre-draft measurables
Height	Weight	Arm length	Hand span
6 ft 0 3/8 in (1.84 m)	223 lb (101 kg)	30 in (0.76 m)	9 1/4 in (0.23 m)
All values from NFL Combine

Prior to his knee injury in the 2003 Fiesta Bowl, McGahee was considered "a cinch top-five pick." Afterwards, McGahee was projected a late third round pick due to risk of "a long rehabilitation process".

=== Buffalo Bills ===
==== 2003 season ====
Eventually, he was selected in the first round with the 23rd overall pick in the 2003 NFL draft by the Buffalo Bills. The Bills originally acquired the pick in a trade that sent Peerless Price to the Atlanta Falcons.

Due to the length of the rehabilitation for his knee, he missed the entire 2003 season.

==== 2004 season ====
McGahee made his NFL debut in Week 1 of the 2004 season against the Jacksonville Jaguars and had nine carries for 31 rushing yards in the 13–10 loss. In Week 6, McGahee assumed the starting role over Travis Henry and had 26 carries for 111 rushing yards in the 20–13 victory over the Miami Dolphins. In Week 8, he scored his first two professional touchdowns in a 38–14 victory over the Arizona Cardinals. In the following game, a 22–17 victory over the New York Jets, he had season-highs with 37 carries for 132 rushing yards and a rushing touchdown in the 22–17 victory. In Week 12, a 38–9 victory over the Seattle Seahawks, he had 28 carries for 116 rushing yards and four rushing touchdowns. The close out the 2004 season, McGahee had two games going over the 100-yard rushing mark while scoring two rushing touchdowns in both of the games. He finished the 2004 season with 284 carries for 1,128 rushing yards and 13 rushing touchdowns to go along with 22 receptions for 169 receiving yards. He was named by the PFWA as Comeback Player of the Year for the 2004 season.

==== 2005 season ====
McGahee started the 2005 season strong with 22 carries for 117 rushing yards in the 22–7 victory over the Houston Texans. In Week 3 against the Atlanta Falcons, he had 27 carries for 140 rushing yards and one rushing touchdown in the 24–16 loss. In Week 6, against the New York Jets, he had 29 carries for 143 rushing yards and one rushing touchdown in the 27–17 victory. In Week 8, against the New England Patriots, he had 31 carries for 136 rushing yards in the 21–16 loss. McGahee closed out the 2005 regular season with 22 carries for 113 rushing yards in a 30–26 loss to the Jets in Week 17. In the 2005 season, McGahee finished with 325 carries for 1,247 rushing yards and five rushing touchdowns to go along with 28 receptions for 178 receiving yards.

==== 2006 season ====
In Week 3, McGahee had 26 carries for 150 rushing yards in the 28–20 loss to the New York Jets. In Week 12, against the Jacksonville Jaguars, he had two rushing touchdowns in the 27–24 victory. In Week 14 against the Jets, he had 16 carries for 125 rushing yards and a rushing touchdown in the 31–13 victory. He finished the 2006 season with 259 carries for 990 rushing yards and six rushing touchdowns to go along with 18 receptions for 156 receiving yards.

Following the 2006 season, after McGahee had made disparaging remarks about the city of Buffalo—including an implication that the Bills should move to Toronto—the Bills traded him to the Baltimore Ravens. The Bills received third and seventh round picks in the 2007 NFL draft and a third round pick in the 2008 NFL draft.

=== Baltimore Ravens ===
==== 2007 season ====
McGahee was traded to the Baltimore Ravens before the 2007 season. He replaced Jamal Lewis, who left the team to play for the Cleveland Browns. He was slated to earn $40.12 million through a seven-year contract, making him one of the league's highest paid running backs. In his first season with Baltimore, he had 294 carries for 1,207 rushing yards and seven rushing touchdowns. McGahee made his first Pro Bowl in 2007, on the strength of five 100+ yard games, and a streak of seven straight games with a rushing touchdown. In addition, he recorded his first career receiving touchdown, along with a career-high 231 receiving yards on 43 receptions. Due to a cracked rib injury suffered against the Seattle Seahawks late in the season, he came up just short of having his best career rushing season, as he had been on pace to do so at the time with his best yards-per-carry average and his best career yards-per-game average.

==== 2008 season ====
McGahee was slated to be the starting running back under new head coach John Harbaugh in 2008, but various injuries through the season, including eye, shoulder, knee and ankle injuries, kept him from achieving his fourth 1,000-yard season in the NFL. Fullback LeRon McClain wound up taking a majority of the snaps that season, as both McGahee and rookie Ray Rice suffered injuries during the season. Despite his injuries, McGahee still rushed for 671 yards and seven touchdowns, including a career-long 77-yard touchdown run against the Dallas Cowboys. He was instrumental in what Baltimore dubbed their "Three-Headed-Monster" rushing attack and still played a key role in the team's 11–5 record and playoff berth.

McGahee's first career post-season play came in 2008, and he did not disappoint. With minor injuries to McClain and Rice, the Ravens relied on McGahee to carry their rushing attack in the playoffs, where he was vital in a 27–9 victory over the Miami Dolphins in the Wild Card Round, and in a close 13–10 victory over the top rated Tennessee Titans in the Divisional Round. During the 2008 AFC Championship, Willis was the Ravens' primary offensive weapon, scoring two touchdowns against the Pittsburgh Steelers to keep the game close. However, following a hard hit by Ryan Clark, he was taken off the field on a stretcher to be evaluated by team physicians. He would later be diagnosed with no serious injury.

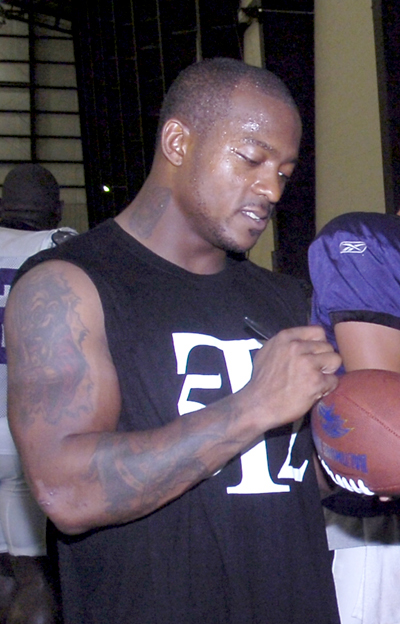
McGahee signing autographs at Andrews Air Force Base, 2007

==== 2009 season ====
McGahee spent the 2009 offseason more seriously dedicated to rehabbing and coming back better than ever. Despite McGahee's extra training, the Ravens decided to go with second-year player Ray Rice as their starter. McClain's carries were drastically reduced, as he took on his traditional run blocking FB role, but McGahee's carries were also severely limited during several games, as the team either tried to have a pass-heavy attack, or relied almost entirely on Rice. Despite this, Willis remained fresh and injury free the entire season, and would actually become the teams' leading scorer, with 14 touchdowns (12 rushing, 2 receiving). In Week 2 against the San Diego Chargers, he scored two rushing touchdowns and two receiving touchdowns in one game, another career record, in the 31–26 victory. In the following game, a 34–3 victory over the Cleveland Browns, he had two more rushing touchdowns. In Week 14, a 48–3 victory over the Detroit Lions, he had a third game with two rushing touchdowns. His 14 regular season touchdowns saw him tied for second most touchdowns in the league in 2009. McGahee ended the season with his best career game, racking up 167 rushing yards on 16 carries and three rushing touchdowns in a 21–13 victory over the Oakland Raiders. He earned AFC Offensive Player of the Week for his game against Oakland. He recorded 20 carries for 62 rushing yards and a rushing touchdown in a Wild Card Round 33–14 blowout of the New England Patriots.

==== 2010 season ====
During the 2010 offseason, McGahee opted to remain with the Baltimore Ravens, instead of going to another team as a possible starter. He appeared in 15 games and recorded 100 carries for 380 rushing yards and five rushing touchdowns to go along with 14 receptions for 55 receiving yards and one receiving touchdown. In the Wild Card Round against the Kansas City Chiefs, McGahee scored a 25-yard touchdown run late in the fourth quarter that sealed the win for Baltimore. The Ravens won by a score of 30–7.

The Ravens released McGahee on July 28, 2011, to allow the team to free up salary cap space. In his four seasons as a Baltimore Raven, he accrued over 3,300 total yards from scrimmage, as well as 35 total regular season touchdowns, including 31 rushing touchdowns.

=== Denver Broncos ===
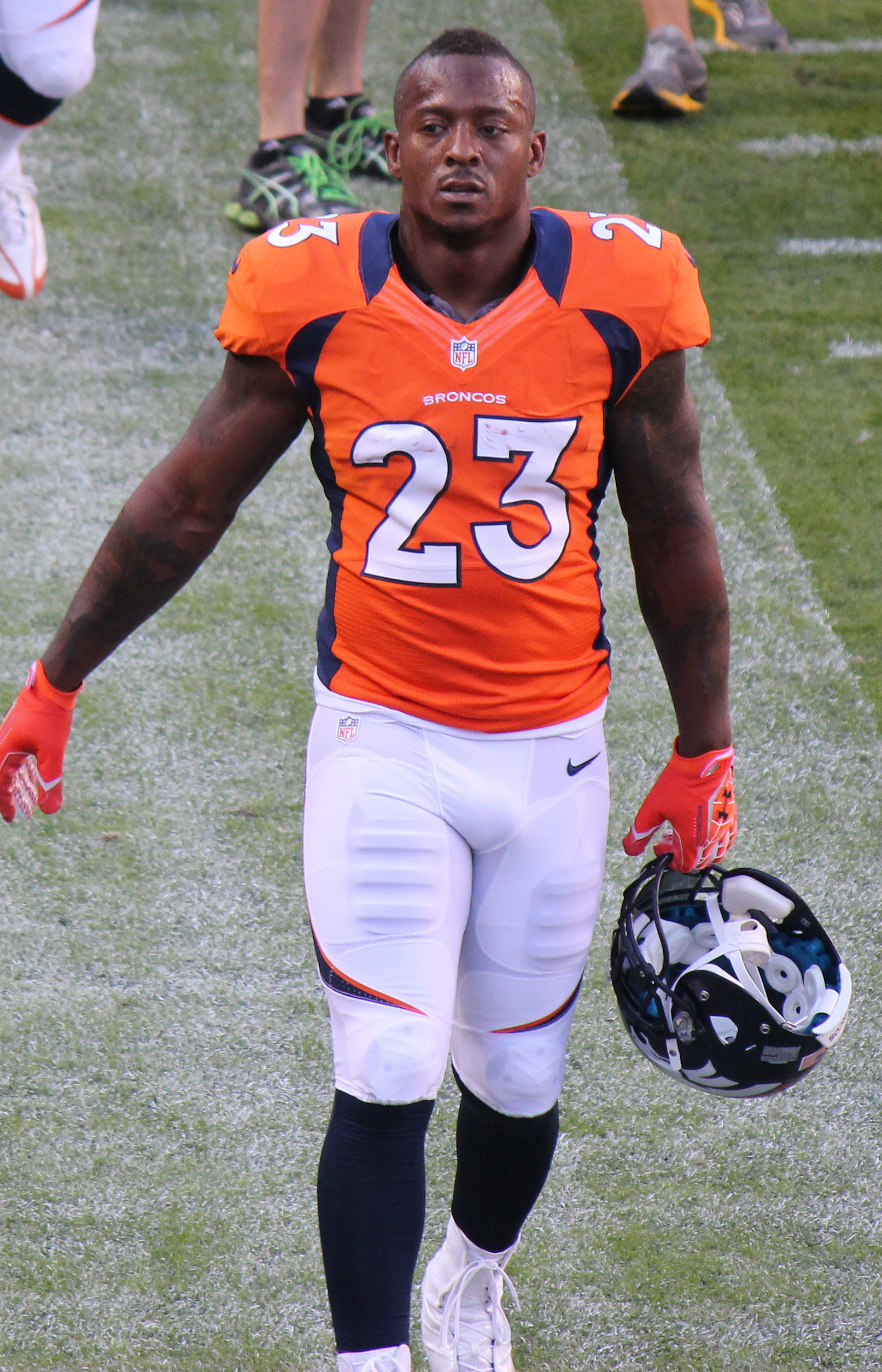
McGahee with the Denver Broncos, 2012

==== 2011 season ====
On July 30, 2011, McGahee signed a four-year deal with the Denver Broncos worth $9.5 million, $3 million being guaranteed. Following an injury in Week 1 to Knowshon Moreno, McGahee became the primary running back for the Broncos and in Week 2 versus the Cincinnati Bengals, he rushed for 101 yards on 28 carries and one rushing touchdown in the 24–22 victory. In a Week 3 loss to the Tennessee Titans, McGahee ran for 52 yards on 22 carries and had a 5-yard reception for a touchdown. During a Week 4 loss to the Green Bay Packers, McGahee rushed 15 times for 103 yards in the 49–23 loss In a Week 5 loss to the Chargers, McGahee rushed for 125 yards on 16 carries. In the Week 7 win against the Dolphins, in the early second half McGahee already racked up 76 yards with an average of 4.2 yards per carry. It looked as if McGahee was on pace for his third-straight 100 yard game, and fourth of the season. However, McGahee fractured his hand early in the second half as well. In that game, McGahee could have moved up from 10th in the NFL in rushing to 8th. McGahee was unable to play the following week against the Lions due to his injury. The Broncos lost 45–10. However, the following week against the Raiders, McGahee came back with a strong performance. He put up 163 rushing yards, which included a 60-yard touchdown and 24-yard touchdown in the 38–24 victory. In a Week 10 game against the Kansas City Chiefs, McGahee ran up one of his blockers legs, and suffered a left hamstring injury. He was taken to the locker room and listed as questionable to return. Head coach John Fox stated in a post-game press conference that McGahee was fine and could've returned in an emergency situation. Fox said McGahee would most likely be able to play in the next game.

On November 23, 2011, McGahee was named a team captain after the release of captain and backup quarterback Kyle Orton. Coach Fox attributed this to the fact that McGahee "had the next most votes when we took the vote [for team captain] back before the season started." In the Week 12 versus the Chargers, he rushed for 117 yards on 23 carries. The 117 yards included two 20-plus yard runs. One of which was a 24-yard run in overtime which set up the Broncos inside of the 20-yard line. This critical run set up the game-winning field goal for Denver. In a Week 13 win against the Vikings, he picked up 111 yards on the ground, which included a 24-yard touchdown run.

In Week 15 against the New England Patriots, McGahee rushed for 70 yards averaging 10 yards per carry but was unfortunately pulled out of the game due to a hamstring injury. With only 10 yards to go to eclipse the 1,000-yard mark, Willis was able to accomplish that feat on a 24-yard run against the Buffalo Bills in week 16. He ended the game with only 64 yards rushing and 15 carries. The next week against the Kansas City Chiefs, McGahee rushed for 145 yards on 28 carries in the 7–3 loss. On January 17, 2012, McGahee was added to the 2012 Pro Bowl Roster to replace Arian Foster. He was ranked 98th by his fellow players on the NFL Top 100 Players of 2012.

==== 2012 season ====
For the 2012 season, McGahee started as the number one running back on the Broncos depth chart. McGahee played well, averaging 4.4 yards per carry through his first ten starts. In Week 2, against the Atlanta Falcons, he had 22 carries for 113 rushing yards and two rushing touchdowns in the 27–21 loss. He had two other games with one rushing touchdowns and a rushing touchdown, in Weeks 4 and 8. McGahee suffered a season-ending injury in Week 11 in a game against the San Diego Chargers on November 18, 2012. The injury occurred when his knee was hit by the helmet of Chargers cornerback Quentin Jammer during the second quarter of the Broncos' 30–23 win. Coach John Fox initially stated that McGahee would not be placed on Injured Reserve, but on November 19, McGahee underwent an MRI that revealed a torn medial collateral ligament and compression fracture in his right knee. McGahee was placed on Injured Reserve on November 21, while the Broncos used the NFL's new "Designated for Return" label, meaning that he could potentially play in the post season. He finished the 2012 season with 167 carries for 731 rushing yards and four rushing touchdowns to go along with 26 receptions for 221 receiving yards.

McGahee was designated for assignment on June 13, 2013, due to health concerns and then waived on June 16.

=== Cleveland Browns ===
After the Cleveland Browns traded Trent Richardson, their first-round (third overall) pick in the 2012 NFL draft, to the Indianapolis Colts for their first-round choice in 2014, the Browns brought in McGahee to replace him. After passing his team physical, McGahee agreed to terms with the Browns.

In the 2013 season, McGahee appeared in 12 games and had 138 carries for 377 rushing yards and two rushing touchdowns.

== Personal life ==
In 2016, he starred on the E! reality television series Famously Single.

McGahee made several appearances in television commercials for Easterns Automotive Group, a local car dealership group in the Washington, D.C., and Baltimore areas, alongside Chief Zee, Antwaan Randle El and Santana Moss.

In a 2023 interview with The Athletic, McGahee stated that he had contemplated suicide "a couple of times" since retiring from the NFL.

== Career statistics ==
=== NFL ===
Legend
**Bold**	Career high

Year	Team	Games		Rushing					Receiving					Fumbles	
Year	Team	GP	GS	Att	Yds	Avg	Lng	TD	Rec	Yds	Avg	Lng	TD	Fum	Lost
2003	BUF	0	0	Did not play due to injury											
2004	BUF	16	11	284	1,128	4.0	41	**13**	22	169	7.7	16	0	4	2
2005	BUF	16	15	**325**	**1,247**	3.8	27	5	28	178	6.4	19	0	1	1
2006	BUF	14	14	259	990	3.8	57T	6	18	156	**8.7**	**56**	0	4	2
2007	BAL	15	15	294	1,207	4.1	46T	7	**43**	**231**	5.4	30	1	4	3
2008	BAL	13	8	170	671	3.9	**77T**	7	24	173	7.2	35	0	3	3
2009	BAL	16	1	109	544	**5.0**	**77T**	12	15	85	5.7	14	**2**	1	1
2010	BAL	15	2	100	380	3.8	30T	5	14	55	3.9	32T	1	2	2
2011	DEN	15	14	249	1,199	4.8	60T	4	12	51	4.3	12	1	4	3
2012	DEN	10	9	167	731	4.4	31	4	26	221	8.5	31	0	**5**	**4**
2013	CLE	12	6	138	377	2.7	16	2	8	20	2.5	9	0	1	1
Career		142	95	2,095	8,474	4.0	77	65	210	1,339	6.4	56	5	29	22

=== College ===
Year	Team	GP	Rushing				Receiving		
Year	Team	GP	Att	Yards	Avg	TDs	Rec	Yards	TDs
2001	Miami	8	67	314	4.7	3	1	−7	0
2002	Miami	13	**282**	**1,753**	**6.2**	**28**	**27**	**355**	0
**Total**		21	349	2,067	5.9	31	28	348	0
