= George Washington High School (Philadelphia) =

Location
- 10175 Bustleton Avenue; Philadelphia, Pennsylvania 19116; United States; 40°06′22″N 75°01′35″W

Information
- School type: Public high school
- Established: 1962
- School district: The School District of Philadelphia
- NCES District ID: 4218990
- CEEB code: 393323
- NCES School ID: 421899006527
- Principal: Susan Thompson
- Staff: 122.40 (FTE)
- Grades: 9–12
- Enrollment: 1,886 (2023-2024)
- Student to teacher ratio: 15.41
- Education system: Secondary school
- Campus type: Urban
- Colors: Blue and Gold
- Team name: Eagles
- Rival: Northeast High School
- Website: George Washington High School

George Washington High School is a public high school in the Somerton section of Philadelphia, Pennsylvania, near Bustleton. The school serves Northeast Philadelphia, including Somerton, Bustleton, and Fox Chase. Named after the first president of the United States, George Washington, it is located on Bustleton Ave.

The school currently has four programs:

- Business and Finance
- Culinary arts (including baking, hospitality administration and management, and travel and tourism)
- International Baccalaureate Program
- Creative and Performing Arts

The school also maintains three career and technology education (CTE) programs:

- Business Technology
- Culinary Arts
- Sports Marketing and Management

== History ==
Beginning on January 8, 2001, there were two fights involving racial issues. Six black students had received criminal charges for ethnic intimidation while the white students had received no charges. The Philadelphia area NAACP chapter's president, J. Whyatt Mondesire, had criticized the lack of charges for the white students.

== School uniforms ==
The school requires its students to wear school uniforms.

For male students, this consists of a jet black or khaki (tan) collared shirt and jet black or khaki (tan) slacks. For female students it is jet black or khaki (tan) collared shirt or blouse and jet black or khaki (tan) slacks or skirt (knee length or longer). The students are also permitted to wear anything with the school's logo or school team/club related wears. This includes gym uniforms, team jackets, team shirts, club shirts, and anything along the line. During the winter, students are also permitted to wear sweater or hoodie of solid black color. Student are not permitted to have hoodies on at any time, nor are any students allowed to wear a hat.

== Feeder patterns ==
Feeder middle schools include Baldi Middle School and General Harry LaBrum Middle School. Feeder K-8 schools include Stephen Decatur School, A. L. Fitzpatrick School, and Joseph Greenberg School. Feeder elementary schools include Anne Frank, Watson T. Comly, Fox Chase, and W. Loesche.

== Transportation ==
SEPTA bus routes 58 and 67 serve Washington.

== Notable alumni ==
- David Berenbaum, writer, Elf, Zoom, The Haunted Mansion, and The Spiderwick Chronicles
- Stephen Costello, Grammy-nominated opera singer (tenor)
- Robert Firth, actor
- Sharrif Floyd, former professional football player, Minnesota Vikings
- Danny Garcia, boxer
- Barton Gellman, Pulitzer Prize-winning journalist
- Kevin Hart, actor and comedian
- Dave Jacobs, former professional football player and entrepreneur
- Dan Master, producer, Little People, Big World, Push Girls, Why Not? with Shania Twain and The Judds
- Adam Mazer, writer and Emmy Award winner, You Don't Know Jack
- Jameel McClain, former professional football player, Baltimore Ravens and New York Giants
- Scott Mantz, American film critic, writer and producer
- Perry Shall, Grammy-nominated artist and musician
- Marc Zumoff, sportscaster
- Aaron Wilmer, former professional football player, Canadian Football League
