= Le'Ron McClain =

American football player (born 1984)

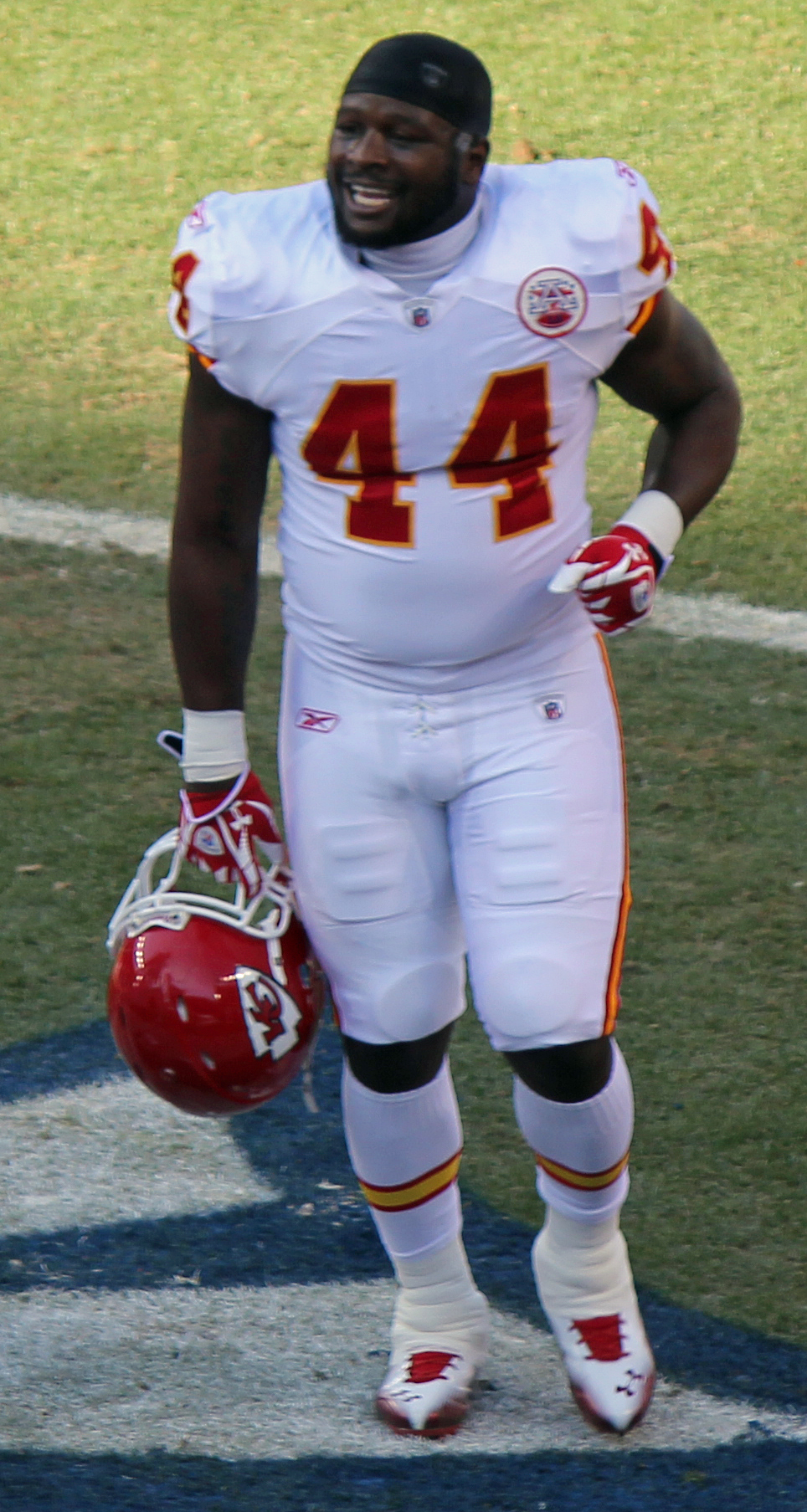
- McClain with the Kansas City Chiefs in 2011

No. 37, 33, 44
- Position: Fullback

Personal information
- Born: December 27, 1984 (age 41); Fort Wayne, Indiana, U.S.
- Listed height: 6 ft 0 in (1.83 m)
- Listed weight: 260 lb (118 kg)

Career information
- High school: Tuscaloosa County (Northport, Alabama)
- College: Alabama (2003–2006)
- NFL draft: 2007: 4th round, 137th overall pick

Career history
- Baltimore Ravens (2007–2010); Kansas City Chiefs (2011); San Diego Chargers (2012–2013)

Awards and highlights
- First-team All-Pro (2008); Second-team All-Pro (2009); 2× Pro Bowl (2008, 2009)

Career NFL statistics
- Rushing yards: 1,310
- Rushing average: 3.7
- Rushing touchdowns: 13
- Receptions: 94
- Receiving yards: 557
- Receiving touchdowns: 3
- Stats at Pro Football Reference

Le'Ron De'Mar McClain (born December 27, 1984) is an American former professional football player who was a fullback in the National Football League (NFL). He played college football for the Alabama Crimson Tide, and was selected by the Baltimore Ravens 137th overall in the fourth round of the 2007 NFL draft.

== Early life and college ==
McClain was born in Fort Wayne, Indiana. He played high school football at Tuscaloosa County High School for the Wildcats.

He accepted an athletic scholarship to attend the University of Alabama, where he played for coach Mike Shula's Alabama Crimson Tide football team from 2003 to 2006.

== Professional career ==
=== Pre-draft ===
McClain was considered one of the best fullbacks available in the 2007 NFL draft, and drew comparisons to William Henderson.

Pre-draft measurables
Height	Weight	Arm length	Hand span	40-yard dash	10-yard split	20-yard split	20-yard shuttle	Three-cone drill	Vertical jump	Broad jump	Bench press
6 ft 0 1/8 in (1.83 m)	256 lb (116 kg)	33 1/2 in (0.85 m)	9 5/8 in (0.24 m)	4.75 s	1.64 s	2.76 s	4.47 s	7.08 s	29.5 in (0.75 m)	9 ft 7 in (2.92 m)	15 reps
All values from NFL Combine/Pro Day

=== Baltimore Ravens ===
McClain was selected with the 137th pick during the fourth round by the Baltimore Ravens.

McClain signed with the Ravens on July 27, 2007. He scored his first career touchdown on a Kyle Boller pass against the San Diego Chargers on November 25, 2007. He finished his rookie season with eight carries for 18 yards, nine receptions for 55 yards, and 1 touchdown.

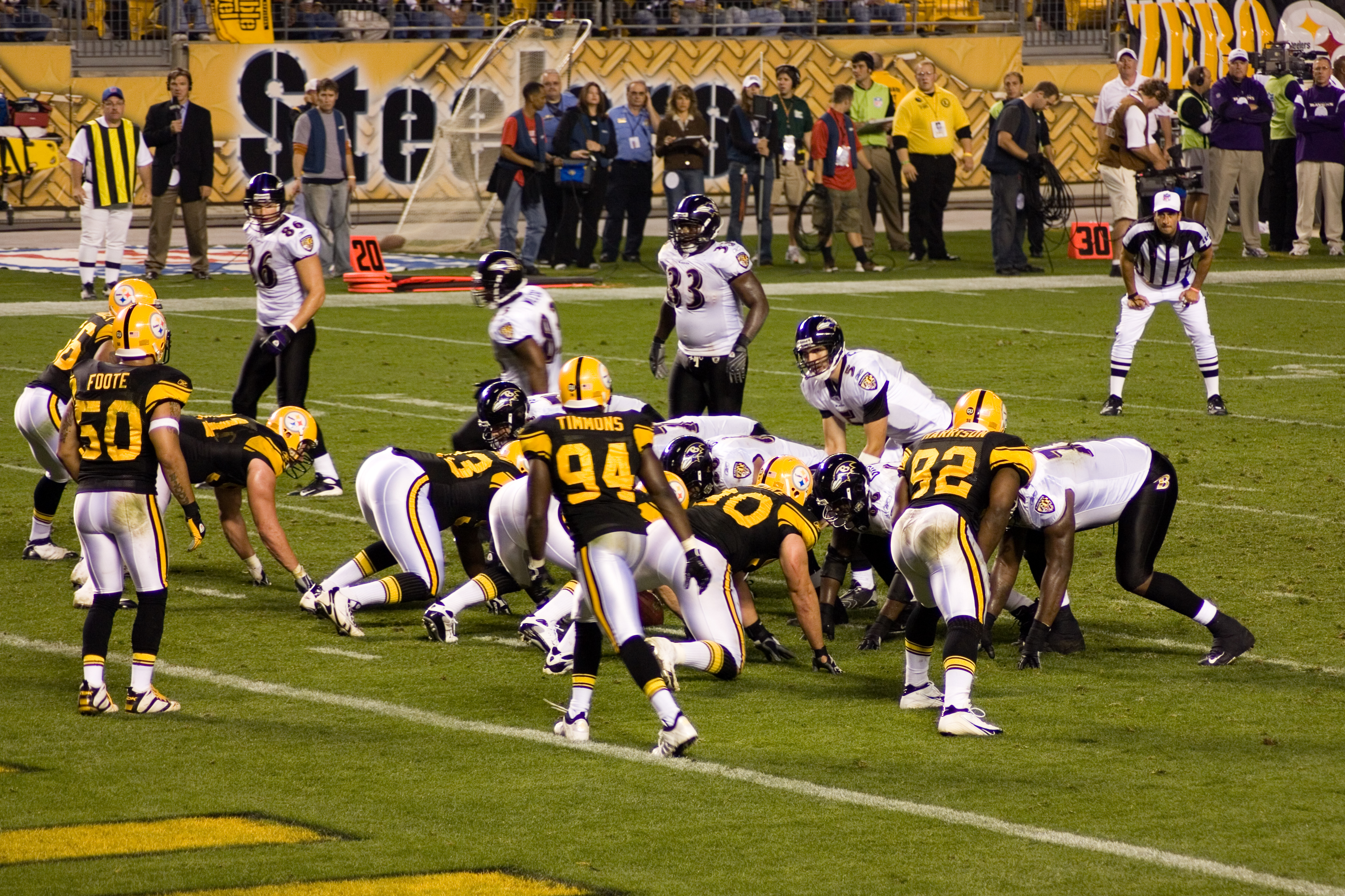
McClain (33, standing) playing against the Pittsburgh Steelers in 2008.

During the 2008 season, McClain became the team's primary running-back as he rushed for a team-high 902 yards and 10 touchdowns on 232 carries (3.9 yards per carry). He also caught 19 passes for 123 yards and a touchdown. On December 20, 2008, McClain ran for 82 yards to score the final touchdown in Texas Stadium against the Dallas Cowboys. Along with teammate Willis McGahee's 77-yard touchdown run on the previous Ravens drive, he and McGahee became the first players ever to run two 70+ touchdown runs on back-to-back drives. The run was also the longest run by an opponent in Texas Stadium. In addition, McClain had 139 rushing yards on the day. McClain's performance earned him a Pro Bowl selection, in which he scored a touchdown off of a Fumblerooski play handed off by former Denver Broncos quarterback Jay Cutler. Cutler put the ball between McClain's legs in which he ran in for a touchdown.

During his last two years as a Raven, McClain lost carries to Willis McGahee and Ray Rice. He publicly complained about not getting enough touches, which led to his departure from the Ravens.

=== Kansas City Chiefs ===
McClain signed a one-year deal with the Kansas City Chiefs on August 3, 2011, after the Baltimore Ravens signed fullback Vonta Leach.

=== San Diego Chargers ===
McClain signed a three-year deal with the San Diego Chargers on March 14, 2012.

On March 3, 2014, McClain was released by the Chargers.

== NFL career statistics ==
Legend
	Led the league
**Bold**	Career high

=== Regular season ===
Year	Team	Games		Rushing					Receiving				
Year	Team	GP	GS	Att	Yds	Avg	Lng	TD	Rec	Yds	Avg	Lng	TD
2007	BAL	**16**	11	8	18	2.3	4	0	9	55	6.1	13	**1**
2008	BAL	**16**	**16**	**232**	**902**	**3.9**	**82**	**10**	19	123	6.5	**25**	**1**
2009	BAL	**16**	14	46	180	**3.9**	20	2	**21**	**141**	**6.7**	19	0
2010	BAL	15	13	28	85	3.0	16	0	**21**	134	6.4	19	0
2011	KAN	**16**	10	15	51	3.4	12	1	14	82	5.9	14	**1**
2012	SDG	**16**	9	14	42	3.0	17	0	8	29	3.6	12	0
2013	SDG	**16**	2	11	32	2.9	7	0	2	-7	-3.5	7	0
		111	75	354	1,310	3.7	82	13	94	557	5.9	25	3

=== Playoffs ===
Year	Team	Games		Rushing					Receiving				
Year	Team	GP	GS	Att	Yds	Avg	Lng	TD	Rec	Yds	Avg	Lng	TD
2008	BAL	**3**	**3**	**32**	**90**	**2.8**	**11**	**1**	0	0	0.0	0	0
2009	BAL	2	2	6	11	1.8	4	**1**	**1**	-4	-4.0	0	0
2010	BAL	2	0	1	1	1.0	1	0	0	0	0.0	0	0
2013	SDG	2	0	1	0	0.0	0	0	0	0	0.0	0	0
		9	5	40	102	2.6	11	2	1	-4	-4.0	0	0

== Personal life ==
His cousin, Rolando McClain, is a linebacker who last played for the Dallas Cowboys.

On November 5, 2014, he was arrested on felony charges of trafficking in synthetic marijuana.
