= Jameel McClain =

American football player (born 1985)

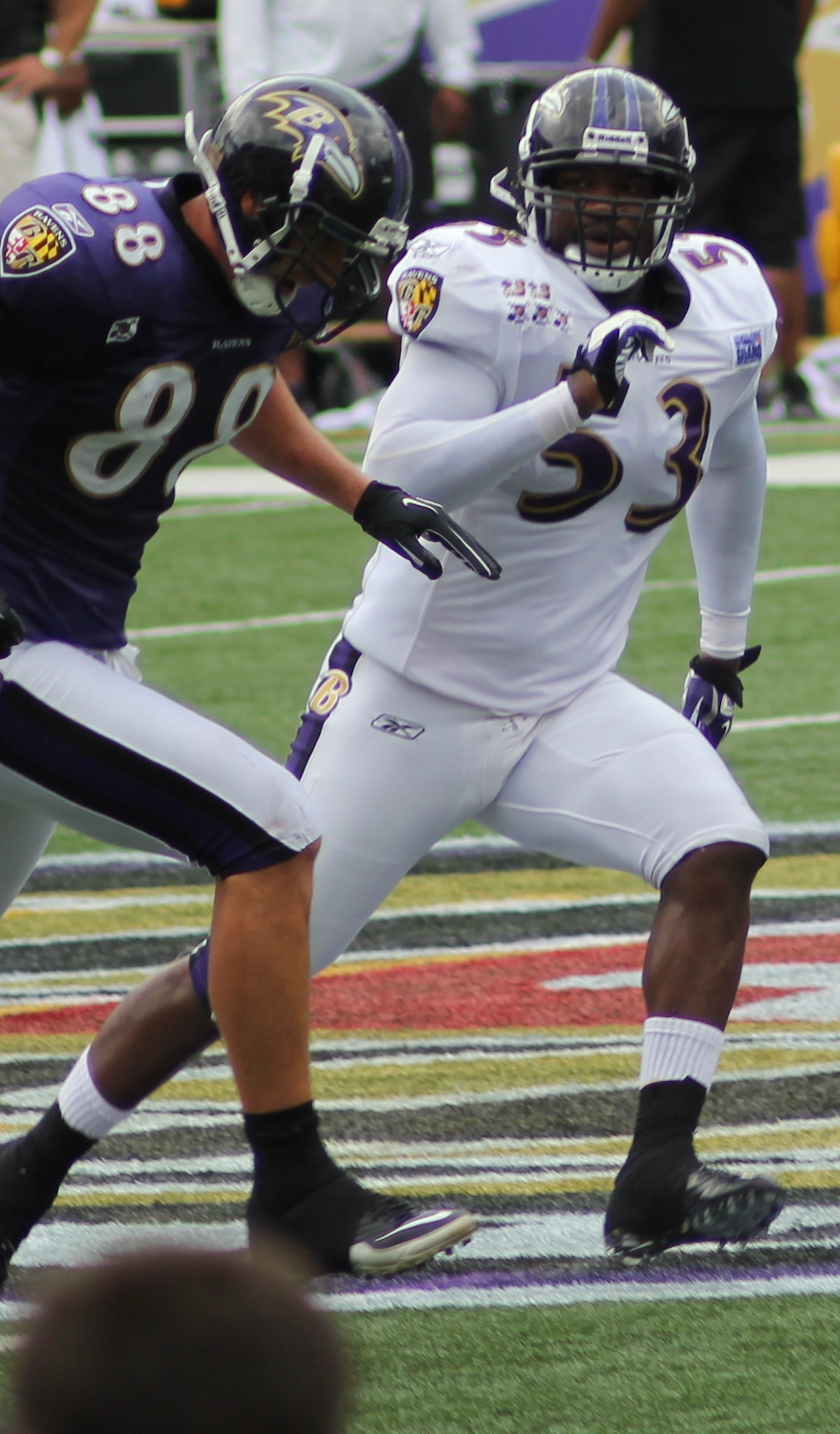
- McClain practicing at M&T Bank Stadium in 2011

Baltimore Ravens
- Position: Director of player engagement

Personal information
- Born: July 25, 1985 (age 41); Philadelphia, Pennsylvania, U.S.
- Listed height: 6 ft 1 in (1.85 m)
- Listed weight: 245 lb (111 kg)

Career information
- High school: George Washington (Philadelphia)
- College: Syracuse
- NFL draft: 2008: undrafted

Career history
- Baltimore Ravens (2008−2013); New York Giants (2014)

Awards and highlights
- Super Bowl champion (XLVII); Second-team All-Big East (2006)

Career NFL statistics
- Total tackles: 448
- Sacks: 7
- Forced fumbles: 2
- Fumble recoveries: 4
- Interceptions: 1
- Defensive touchdowns: 1
- Stats at Pro Football Reference

Jameel Lashawn McClain (born July 25, 1985) is an American former professional football linebacker who is currently the director of player engagement for the Baltimore Ravens. After playing college football for Syracuse University, he was signed by the Ravens as an undrafted free agent in 2008. He was also a member of the New York Giants.

== Early life ==
McClain was born in Philadelphia, Pennsylvania to a Barbara Flood and Ralph McClain and has five siblings. Jameel was raised by his mother and spent many nights in Philadelphia's salvation Army. At the age of 14 his aunt and uncle took him in permanently providing him and his siblings with a better education and future.

Before football, Jameel was an aspiring boxer during his grade school years, training at the city gym and competing in Gold Glove competitions. Jameel attended George Washington High School in Philadelphia where he recorded 230 tackles, 22 sacks, 8 FFs and 13 FRs in his career. Jameel served as caption of his football team during his senior season at George Washington.

== College career ==
McClain played college football at Syracuse University as defensive end, while double majoring in communications/rhetorical studies and sociology. During his collegiate career he recorded 177 tackles, 21.5 tackles-for-loss, 11 sacks, 3 fumble recoveries, one forced fumble and one interception. Jameel was ranked 7th on SU’s record list for tackles by a down lineman and is tied for 11th on the career tackle-for-loss record list. Prior to his 2006 Spring practice, Jameel moved from linebacker to defensive end and was a member of the 2006 Spring, 2006 Fall and 2007 Spring Athletic Director’s Honor Roll.

== Professional career ==
=== Baltimore Ravens ===
McClain signed with the Baltimore Ravens as an undrafted free agent in 2008 as the only rookie free agent to make the Ravens 53 man roster that year. During his debut season he played spot duty and some special teams work. He recorded 16 combined tackles, a blocked punt, 2 safeties, 4 assists and 2.5 sacks in the regular season. Jameel established a franchise record with 2 safeties in one season.

McClain started his first career game in 2009 against the Indianapolis Colts on November 22 and finished the season with 30 combined tackles. He started 16 out of 16 games in 2010 finishing with 71 tackles, 2 PD, 1 FR, and 1 sack.

In the 2011 season, McClain had a career high of 84 tackles, 34 assists, 2 FR, 4 PD, and 1 sack.

McClain remained a consistent presence and one of the pillars of the Ravens defense with 79 tackles in 2012 and earned a Super Bowl championship and AFC championship. During Week 14’s game against the Washington Redskins, McClain suffered a spinal cord contusion and was placed on injured reserve and told by at least one doctor that he would never play football again.

After McClain’s life changing spinal injury, he sat out the required six weeks then returned to action in Week 7 of the 2013 season against the Pittsburgh Steelers. After 10 months of rehabilitation, Jameel returned to the Ravens lineup as a starter. During his 2013 season, he played 13 games, recorded 52 tackles, 22 assists and 3 PD.

On February 27, 2014, McClain was released by the Ravens.

=== New York Giants ===
On March 13, 2014, McClain signed with the New York Giants.

In his 1st season with the Giants in 2014, McClain played in all 16 games with 14 starts – 9 at middle linebacker and 5 at strongside backer. He led the Giants with a career-high 117 tackles (75 solo and tied his career high with 2.5 sacks, forced a fumble and had 2 passes defensed.

On September 5, 2015, he was cut by the Giants.

=== NFL statistics ===
Year	Team	GP	COMB	TOTAL	AST	SACK	FF	FR	FR YDS	INT	IR YDS	AVG IR	LNG	TD	PD
2008	BAL	16	16	12	4	2.5	0	0	0	0	0	0	0	0	0
2009	BAL	16	30	21	9	0.0	0	0	0	0	0	0	0	0	0
2010	BAL	16	71	46	25	1.0	0	1	9	0	0	0	0	0	2
2011	BAL	16	84	50	34	1.0	0	2	6	1	8	8	8	0	4
2012	BAL	13	79	57	22	0.0	0	1	0	0	0	0	0	0	3
2013	BAL	10	52	29	23	0.0	1	0	0	0	0	0	0	0	0
2014	NYG	16	116	74	42	2.5	1	0	0	0	0	0	0	0	2
Career		103	448	289	159	7.0	2	4	15	1	8	8	8	0	11

== Personal life ==
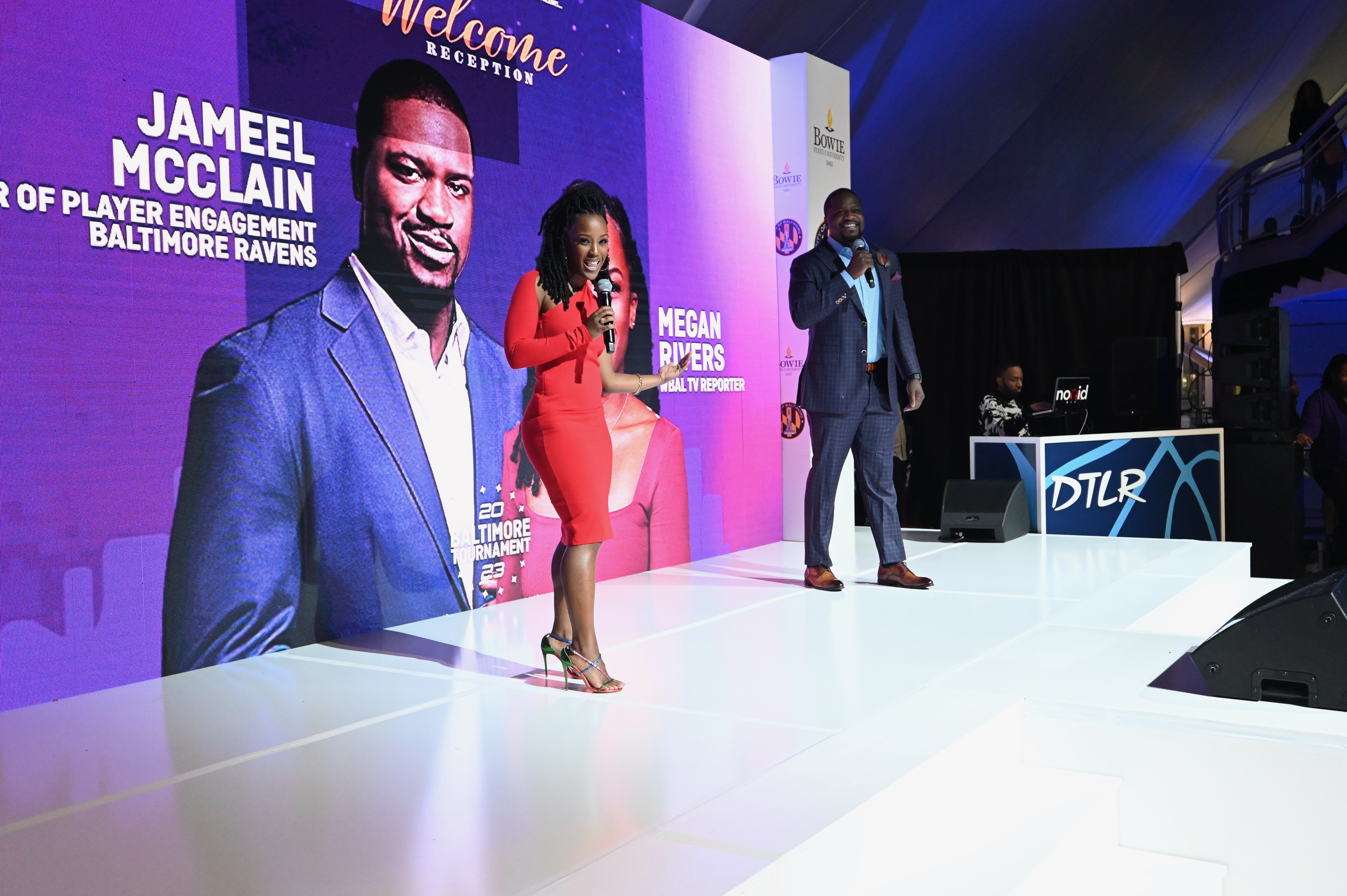
McClain at the CIAA Welcome Reception in Baltimore in 2023.

Off the field McClain has participated in many philanthropic events. During his upbringing in Philadelphia, Jameel often found himself with his three siblings and mother relying on the Salvation Army Rescue Shelter for food and a bed. “You’d just have nights where food was a figment of your stomach's imagination, where you would go to bed hungry," McClain recalls "Having the same jeans weeks at a time, sharing a room at the shelter with strangers and having to be there at a certain time, worrying that people were going to come in your room after you were asleep and mess with you...there were some tough times."

He has channeled his experiences and lessons into dedicating himself to the community and giving to those less fortunate. McClain used his experiences at the Salvation Army to help build the foundation for his future, earning a scholarship from Syracuse University to play football and joining the Baltimore Ravens 53 man roster. Since joining the Baltimore community in 2008 he has built a lasting relationship with the Salvation Army, becoming their spokesperson and speaking at their annual Red Kettle Campaign. In 2009 McClain and a few of his Ravens teammates participated in the Salvation Army’s Holiday Gift Distribution by distributing gift packages to local families in need. He has also worked with the United Way on a number of their “Extreme Makeover” projects, helping to renovate the Woodmoor Police Athletic League Center and the Medfield Recreation Center.

In 2009 Jameel spearheaded a Thanksgiving event called the “53 Families Dinner,” an affair benefiting members of the Salvation Army by providing a hot Thanksgiving meal to those in need. 53 Families Dinner continues to run successfully each Thanksgiving for Baltimore’s Salvation Army, with the help of Jameel and Ravens players. Jameel has also helped organized and run the “Jameel McClain Coat Drive,” benefitting about 300 children from around the Baltimore area with a new, warm winter coat. From the third annual “Lardarius Webb Charity Softball Game” to being a spokesperson at the Salvation Army “Kettle Kickoff,” McClain not only participates in these events but finds new ways to positively impact the community.

He has remained a constant contributor to the Salvation Army and was honored by the NAACP for his tireless efforts on behalf of the youth and the disadvantaged in Baltimore. In 2013 Jameel was honored with the Ed Block Courage Award for his outstanding work and charitable efforts to the Baltimore community.

On July 2, 2016, he married Mrs. Keisha Nichole McClain (née Sullivan) in Baltimore, Maryland.
