= Daniel Wilcox =

American football player (born 1977)

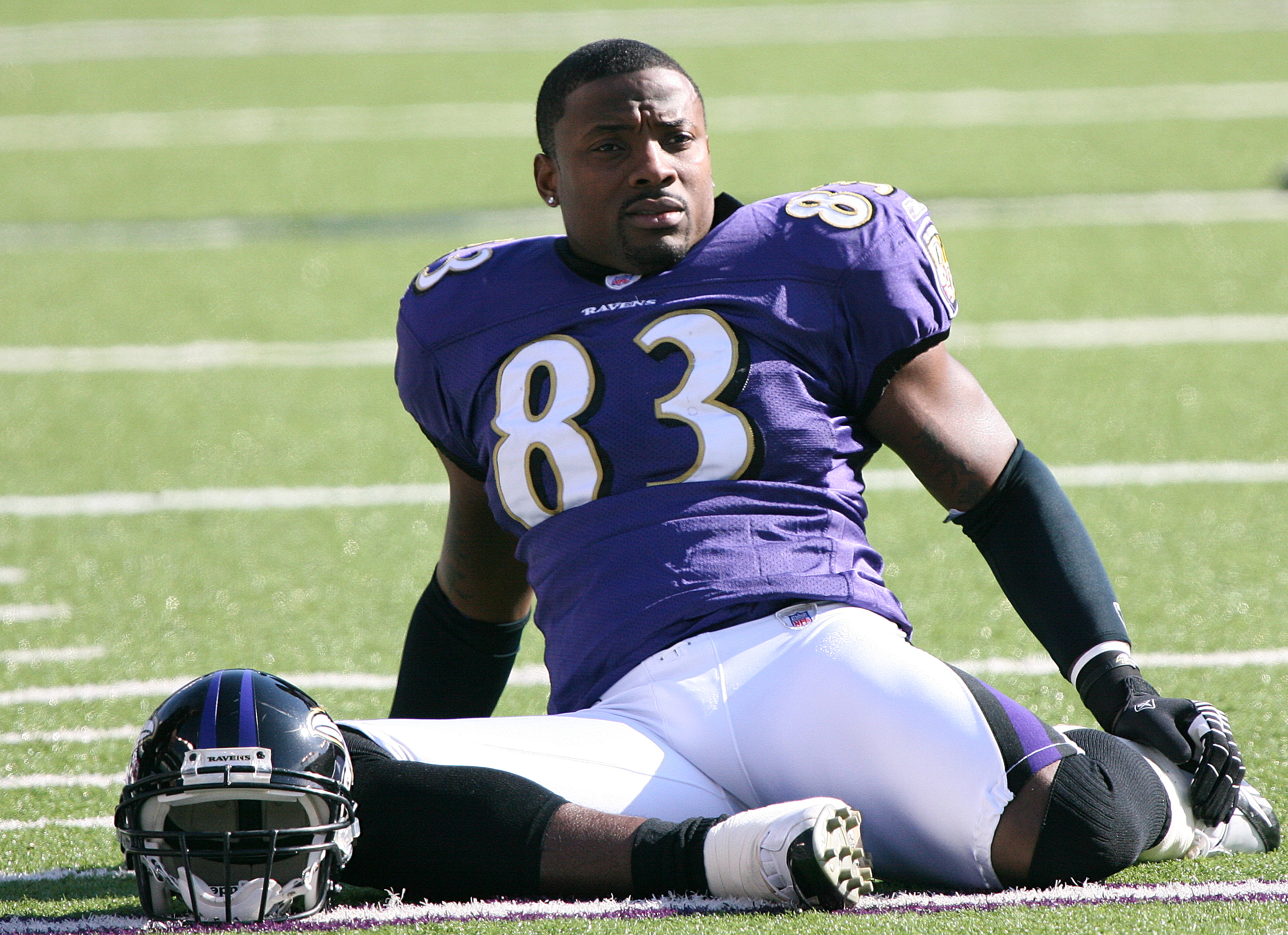
- Wilcox with the Baltimore Ravens in 2006

No. 86, 41, 43, 44, 83
- Position: Tight end

Personal information
- Born: March 23, 1977 (age 49); Atlanta, Georgia, U.S.
- Listed height: 6 ft 1 in (1.85 m)
- Listed weight: 245 lb (111 kg)

Career information
- High school: Decatur (Decatur, Georgia)
- College: Appalachian State
- NFL draft: 2001: undrafted

Career history
- New York Jets (2001); Tampa Bay Buccaneers (2002–2003); Rhein Fire (2004); Baltimore Ravens (2004–2008)

Awards and highlights
- Super Bowl champion (XXXVII)

Career NFL statistics
- Receptions: 76
- Receiving yards: 576
- Receiving touchdowns: 8
- Stats at Pro Football Reference

Daniel Wilcox (born March 23, 1977) is an American former professional football player who was a tight end in the National Football League (NFL) for the New York Jets, Tampa Bay Buccaneers, and Baltimore Ravens. He attended Appalachian State University.

== Early life ==
Wilcox attended Decatur High School in Decatur, Georgia

== College career ==
Wilcox played college football at Georgia Military Junior College, where he graduated with an associate's degree. He then transferred to FCS powerhouse Appalachian State University. He finished his career with 91 receptions for 940 yards and seven touchdowns. He majored in communications and advertising.

== Professional career ==
=== New York Jets ===
Wilcox signed for the New York Jets as an undrafted free agent on April 26, 2001. In his rookie season, he only saw action in two games. His 1st NFL game was Monday night football vs the Pittsburgh Steelers. His second career game came in the 1st round of the playoffs vs the Oakland Raiders.

=== Tampa Bay Buccaneers ===
On December 17, 2002, Wilcox was signed to the Tampa Bay Buccaneers' active roster, where they won their first Super Bowl in franchise history. The game was called the Pirate Bowl, being that it featured the "Buccaneers vs the Raiders". In 2003, he started and played in two games, recording one special teams tackle before being released by the Bucs in week three.

=== Rhein Fire ===
Played for the Rhein Fire (NFL Europe) in 2004. Wore #45 as TE for the Rhein Fire... 20 Catches, 208 Yards & 3 TD's for Rhein Fire.

=== Baltimore Ravens ===
Wilcox signed with the Baltimore Ravens on June 21, 2004. In his debut season with the Ravens, he played in all 16 games, making five starts. He finished the season with 25 receptions for 219 yards. He caught his first NFL touchdown with the Philadelphia Eagles on October 31. In the 2005 season, he played in 13 games, making three starts before an ankle injury placed him on the injured reserve list., He made 20 receptions for 154 yards and a touchdown. In 2006, he played in 14 games with six starts, making 20 catches for 166 yards. He finished the season with three touchdowns, a career-high. On March 1, 2006, Wilcox signed a three-year contract extension. Wilcox showed off his nice hands with a one-handed touchdown catch in week 13 against the Philadelphia Eagles in the 2008 season.

== Personal life ==
Married to the former pageant winner, Ms. Belize of New York, Shauna Chin, on June 28, 2008. Mr. & Mrs. Daniel Wilcox's wedding was featured on Style Network's Whose Wedding is it Anyway?.
