= Edward Williams (American football) =

American football player (born 1982)

Profile
- Position: Wide receiver

Personal information
- Born: November 24, 1982 (age 43); Montgomery, Alabama
- Listed height: 6 ft 4 in (1.93 m)
- Listed weight: 215 lb (98 kg)

Career information
- College: Lane
- NFL draft: 2008: undrafted

Career history
- Tennessee Titans (2008)*; Baltimore Ravens (2008–2009)*; Cleveland Browns (2009)*
- * Offseason or practice squad member only

Edward Williams (born November 24, 1982) is an American former football wide receiver. He was signed by the Tennessee Titans as an undrafted free agent in 2008. He played college football at Lane.

Williams has been a member of the Baltimore Ravens and Cleveland Browns.
