= Tavares Gooden =

American football player (born 1984)

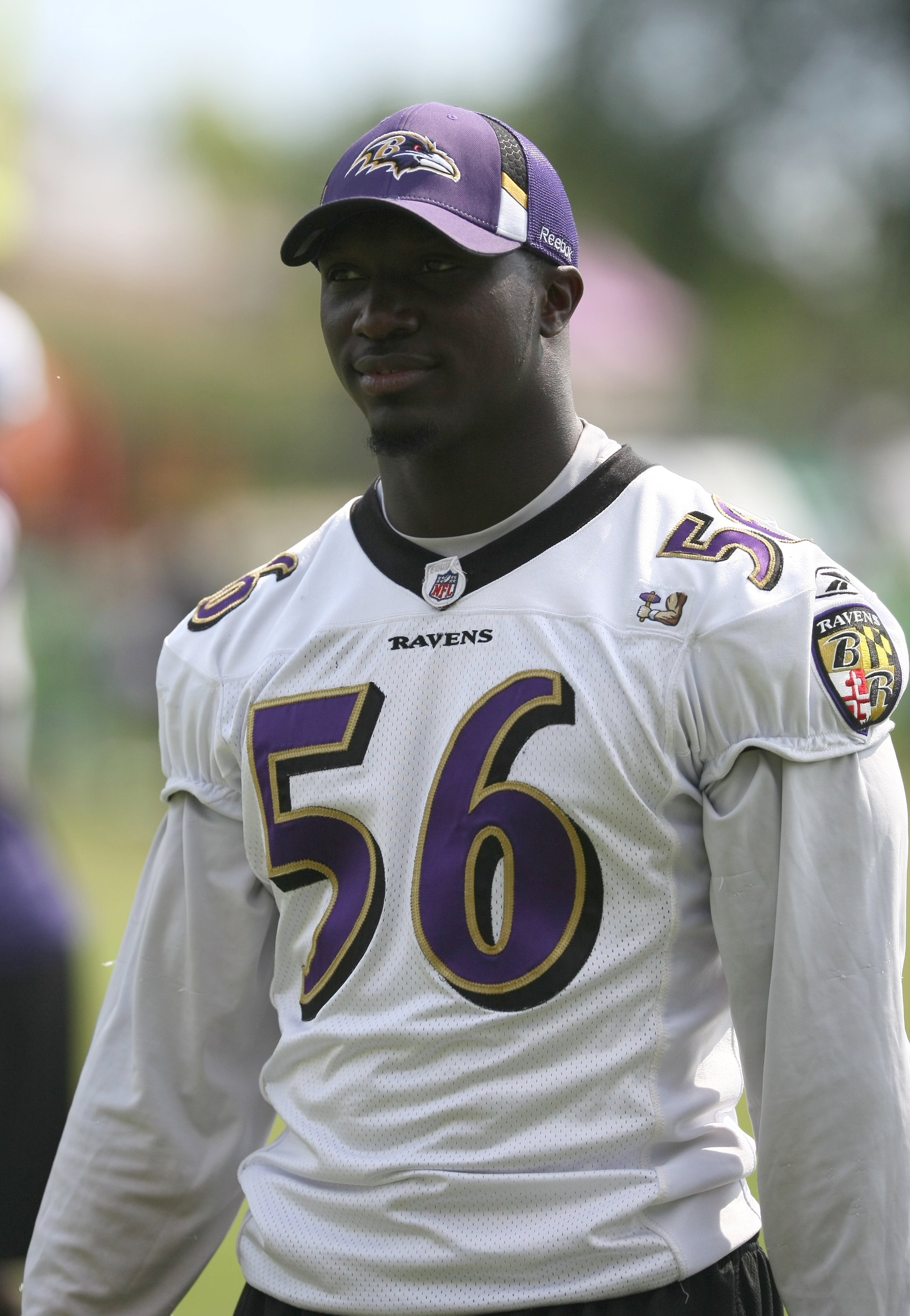
- Gooden with the Baltimore Ravens in 2009

No. 56, 52
- Position: Linebacker

Personal information
- Born: October 7, 1984 (age 42); Fort Lauderdale, Florida, U.S.
- Listed height: 6 ft 1 in (1.85 m)
- Listed weight: 242 lb (110 kg)

Career information
- High school: St. Thomas Aquinas (Fort Lauderdale)
- College: Miami (FL)
- NFL draft: 2008: 3rd round, 71st overall pick

Career history
- Baltimore Ravens (2008−2010); San Francisco 49ers (2011−2012); Houston Texans (2013)

Career NFL statistics
- Total tackles: 91
- Forced fumbles: 2
- Stats at Pro Football Reference

Tavares Gooden (born October 7, 1984) is an American former professional football player who was a linebacker in the National Football League (NFL). He was selected by the Baltimore Ravens in the third round of the 2008 NFL draft. He played college football for the Miami Hurricanes.

== Early life ==
Gooden played high school football at St. Thomas Aquinas High School in Fort Lauderdale, Florida, where he was a three-sport star in football, track and basketball. He was a two-time Class 4A All-State selection. One of his teammates was Nate Salley. As a junior in 2001, he made 87 tackles, 12.5 sacks and three forced fumbles. In his senior year, he was a first-team All-Broward selection at defensive end.

Also a standout track and field athlete, Gooden was the 2002 state champion in the discus at 181 feet (and had a personal best of 197 feet). He had bests of 21 feet in the long jump and 6–8 in the high jump. Also a member of the 4x100 relay (42.10 s).

=== Recruiting ===
Regarded as a four-star recruit by Rivals.com, Gooden was listed as the No. 5 inside linebacker prospect of the class of 2003. He chose Miami over Ohio State and LSU.

== College career ==
In his true freshman season with the University of Miami, Gooden played in all 13 games, almost entirely on special teams, where he made 10 tackles (six solo). By his sophomore year he became starting weakside linebacker, but suffered a shoulder injury and did not start the final three regular-season games, though he did see action. For the season, Gooden totaled 83 tackles (third on the team), 10 tackles for loss, a half sack and three pass breakups. He started in the 2004 Peach Bowl and made six tackles (two solo), one tackle for loss, and one pass breakup.

Starting his junior season at strongside linebacker, Gooden suffered a dislocated left shoulder in the first quarter of the season opener vs. Florida State, and missed the remainder of the year. He received a medical redshirt and underwent surgery on October 3, 2005.

In 2006, he returned as the Hurricanes' strongside linebacker, playing in 11 games and making four starts. He totalled 41 tackles (27 solo), adding five tackles for loss, three quarterback pressures, and two pass breakups. Gooden also made a season-high nine tackles in the 2006 MPC Computers Bowl.

He was one of the students involved in the underground rap group 7th Floor Crew, which consisted of former and current University of Miami students who recorded a rap song that contained lewd sexual references. He went by the name "T-Good".

== Professional career ==
=== Pre-draft ===
Although considered one of the better linebacker prospects in the 2008 NFL draft, Gooden raised some concerns due to his history of injuries, including a dislocated left shoulder.

Pre-draft measurables
| Height | Weight | Arm length | Hand span | 40-yard dash | 10-yard split | 20-yard split | Vertical jump | Broad jump | Bench press |
|---|---|---|---|---|---|---|---|---|---|
| 6 ft 1 1/4 in (1.86 m) | 234 lb (106 kg) | 32 1/2 in (0.83 m) | 10 1/4 in (0.26 m) | 4.57 s | 1.57 s | 2.63 s | 35 in (0.89 m) | 9 ft 10 in (3.00 m) | 22 reps |
All values from NFL Combine/Pro Day Did not participate in shuttle/cone drill, because of hip injury.

=== Baltimore Ravens ===
Gooden was selected by the Baltimore Ravens in the third round (71st overall) of the 2008 NFL Draft.

Gooden had only five total tackles in four games of the 2008 season. Gooden started at inside linebacker alongside Ray Lewis for the 2009 season, but was oft-injured and only played 12 games while making 47 tackles. A backup again in 2010, Gooden recorded only 18 tackles, and was often hurt.

He was released on September 3, 2011.

=== San Francisco 49ers ===
On September 4, Gooden signed with the San Francisco 49ers, playing primarily on special teams.

At the end of the 2012 season, Gooden and the 49ers appeared in Super Bowl XLVII. In the game, he contributed on special teams, but the 49ers fell to his former team, the Baltimore Ravens, by a score of 34–31.

=== Houston Texans ===
On October 28, 2013, Gooden signed with the Houston Texans as a free agent. He was released on November 8, 2013.
