= 2009 Baltimore Ravens season =

NFL team season

- Owner: Steve Bisciotti
- General manager: Ozzie Newsome
- Head coach: John Harbaugh
- Offensive coordinator: Cam Cameron
- Defensive coordinator: Greg Mattison
- Home stadium: M&T Bank Stadium

Results
- Record: 9–7
- Division place: 2nd AFC North
- Playoffs: Won Wild Card Playoffs (at Patriots) 33–14; Lost Divisional Playoffs (at Colts) 3–20
- All-Pros: MLB Ray Lewis (1st team); RB Ray Rice (2nd team); FB Le'Ron McClain (2nd team); DT Haloti Ngata (2nd team); S Ed Reed (2nd team)
- Pro Bowlers: RB Ray Rice; FB LeRon McClain; DT Haloti Ngata; MLB Ray Lewis; FS Ed Reed

Uniform
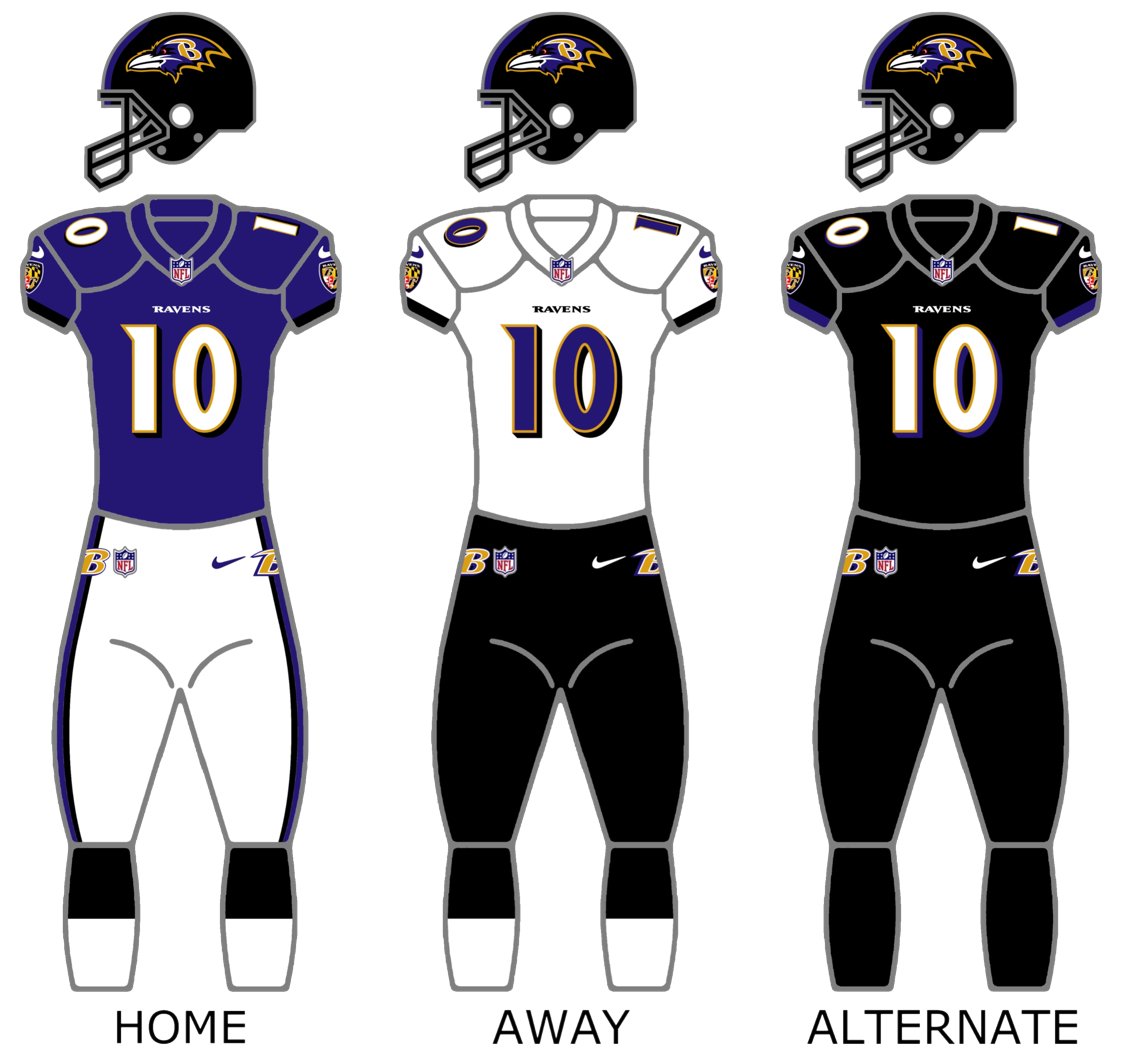

The 2009 season was the Baltimore Ravens' 14th in the National Football League (NFL). The franchise entered the season off an 11–5 record in their previous season, a playoff berth, but a loss in the American Football Conference (AFC) Championship game against the eventual Super Bowl XLIII champions, the Pittsburgh Steelers. The Ravens recorded nine victories to seven losses, although they were unable to win the AFC North division title. However, due to various playoff clinching scenarios in the AFC, the Ravens were able to clinch a wild card berth against the Oakland Raiders in Week 17. As the sixth seed in the AFC for the second straight year, they defeated the third seeded New England Patriots in Foxboro in the AFC Wild Card playoffs, handing Tom Brady's first ever playoff loss at home and New England's first home playoff loss since 1978. They, however, lost in the AFC Divisional playoffs against the top seeded and eventual AFC champion Indianapolis Colts; with this loss, the 2009 season came to an end for the Ravens. For head coach John Harbaugh, this was his second year with the franchise, compiling an overall record of 20–12 in the regular season.

== Offseason ==
Rex Ryan, a longtime fixture on the Ravens' sidelines, departed for New York to become the New York Jets head coach after the Ravens fell to the Steelers in the 2008 AFC Championship game.

Other notable offseason departures include linebacker Bart Scott and safety Jim Leonhard, both of whom left Baltimore to follow Rex Ryan to New York, and longtime placekicker Matt Stover. On March 5, 2009, Stover told reporters that the Ravens were "going in a different direction." When Stover's tenure ended with the Ravens, the team severed ties with one of its two remaining players from the Ravens' first season in 1996; the other being Ray Lewis.

=== 2009 NFL draft ===
The Baltimore Ravens had six selections going into the 2009 NFL draft, which was held in Radio City Music Hall in New York City, New York on April 25 and April 26, 2009.

2009 Baltimore Ravens draft
Round	Pick	Player	Position	College	Notes
1	23	Michael Oher	OT	Ole Miss	
2	57	Paul Kruger	DE	Utah	
3	88	Lardarius Webb	CB	Nicholls State	
5	137	Jason Phillips	LB	TCU	
5	149	Davon Drew	TE	East Carolina	
6	185	Cedric Peerman *	RB	Virginia	
Made roster † Pro Football Hall of Fame * Made at least one Pro Bowl during career

== Roster ==
=== Opening training camp roster ===
Baltimore Ravens 2009 opening training camp roster
Quarterbacks: 12 John Beck; 5 Joe Flacco; 10 Troy Smith; Running backs: 39 Jason Cook FB; 32 Matt Lawrence; 33 Le'Ron McClain FB; 34 Jalen Parmele; 38 Cedric Peerman; 27 Ray Rice; Wide receivers: 18 Drew Bennett; 89 Mark Clayton; 8 Biren Ealy; -- Jayson Foster; 14 Justin Harper; 85 Derrick Mason; 13 Eron Riley; 81 Marcus Smith; 15 Kelley Washington; 17 Ernie Wheelwright; 87 Demetrius Williams; Tight ends: 83 Davon Drew; 86 Todd Heap; 84 Edgar Jones; 82 L. J. Smith; 80 Isaac Smolko	Offensive linemen: 77 Matt Birk C; 65 Chris Chester G; 64 Oniel Cousins T; 60 Robby Felix G; 71 Jared Gaither T; 62 David Hale C; 72 Bryan Mattison G; 76 Joe Reitz T; 69 Stefan Rodgers T; 63 Tre' Stallings G; 78 Adam Terry T; Defensive linemen: 94 Justin Bannan DE; 96 Lamar Divens NT; 93 Dwan Edwards DE; 97 Kelly Gregg NT; 67 Will Johnson DE; 91 Brandon McKinney NT; 92 Haloti Ngata DE; 90 Trevor Pryce DE; 98 Kelly Talavou NT	Linebackers: 51 Brendon Ayanbadejo ILB; 50 Antwan Barnes OLB; 54 Prescott Burgess OLB; 48 Dannell Ellerbe ILB; 45 Tony Fein ILB; 56 Tavares Gooden ILB; 95 Jarret Johnson OLB; 99 Paul Kruger OLB; 52 Ray Lewis ILB; 53 Jameel McClain ILB; 58 Jason Phillips ILB; 55 Terrell Suggs OLB; 68 Willie VanDeSteeg OLB; Defensive backs: 30 Chris Carr CB; 24 Domonique Foxworth CB; 40 K. J. Gerard CB; 26 Dawan Landry SS; 29 Derrick Martin CB; 43 Haruki Nakamura FS; 25 Evan Oglesby CB; 20 Ed Reed FS; 22 Samari Rolle CB; 41 Frank Walker CB; 31 Fabian Washington CB; 21 Lardarius Webb CB; 28 Tom Zbikowski SS; Special teams: 7 Graham Gano K; 6 Stephen Hauschka K; 70 Matt Katula LS; 4 Sam Koch P	Reserve lists: 16 Yamon Figurs WR (Active/PUP); 66 Ben Grubbs G (Active/PUP); 23 Willis McGahee RB (Active/PUP); 59 Greg Ryan C (IR); 79 Lou Saucedo T (W/I); 73 Marshal Yanda G (Active/PUP); Unsigned draft picks: 74 Michael Oher T; 79 active, 2 inactive, 1 unsigned

=== Week 1 roster ===
Baltimore Ravens 2009 week 1 roster
Quarterbacks: 12 John Beck; 5 Joe Flacco; 10 Troy Smith; Running backs: 32 Matt Lawrence; 33 Le'Ron McClain FB; 23 Willis McGahee; 34 Jalen Parmele; 27 Ray Rice; Wide receivers: 89 Mark Clayton; 85 Derrick Mason; 15 Kelley Washington; 87 Demetrius Williams; Tight ends: 86 Todd Heap; 84 Edgar Jones; 82 L. J. Smith	Offensive linemen: 77 Matt Birk C; 65 Chris Chester G; 64 Oniel Cousins T; 71 Jared Gaither T; 66 Ben Grubbs G; 62 David Hale C; 79 Tony Moll G; 74 Michael Oher T; 73 Marshal Yanda G; Defensive linemen: 94 Justin Bannan DE; 93 Dwan Edwards DE; 97 Kelly Gregg NT; 91 Brandon McKinney NT; 92 Haloti Ngata DE; 90 Trevor Pryce DE; 98 Kelly Talavou NT	Linebackers: 51 Brendon Ayanbadejo ILB; 50 Antwan Barnes OLB; 54 Prescott Burgess OLB; 59 Dannell Ellerbe ILB; 56 Tavares Gooden ILB; 95 Jarret Johnson OLB; 99 Paul Kruger OLB; 52 Ray Lewis ILB; 53 Jameel McClain ILB; 55 Terrell Suggs OLB; Defensive backs: 25 Chris Carr CB; 24 Domonique Foxworth CB; 26 Dawan Landry SS; 43 Haruki Nakamura SS; 20 Ed Reed FS; 41 Frank Walker CB; 31 Fabian Washington CB; 21 Lardarius Webb CB; 28 Tom Zbikowski FS; Special teams: 6 Stephen Hauschka K; 70 Matt Katula LS; 4 Sam Koch P	Reserve lists: 96 Lamar Divens NT (IR); -- Brian Johnson G (IR); 58 Jason Phillips ILB (IR); 22 Samari Rolle CB (PUP); -- Greg Ryan C (IR); -- Lou Saucedo T (IR); 81 Marcus Smith WR (IR); 88 Quinn Sypniewski TE (PUP); 78 Adam Terry T (IR); Practice squad: 40 K. J. Gerard FS; 14 Justin Harper WR; 72 Bryan Mattison G; 76 Joe Reitz T; 13 Eron Riley WR; 69 Stefan Rodgers T; 80 Isaac Smolko TE; 68 Willie VanDeSteeg OLB; 53 active, 9 inactive, 8 PS

=== Final roster ===
2009 Baltimore Ravens roster
Quarterbacks (QB): 12 John Beck; 5 Joe Flacco; 10 Troy Smith; Running backs (RB): 33 Le'Ron McClain FB; 23 Willis McGahee; 34 Jalen Parmele; 27 Ray Rice; Wide receivers (WR): 89 Mark Clayton; 14 Justin Harper; 85 Derrick Mason; 17 David Tyree; 15 Kelley Washington; 87 Demetrius Williams; Tight ends (TE): 86 Todd Heap; 84 Edgar Jones; 82 L. J. Smith	Offensive linemen (OL): 77 Matt Birk C; 65 Chris Chester G; 64 Oniel Cousins T; 71 Jared Gaither T; 66 Ben Grubbs G; 62 David Hale C; 79 Tony Moll G; 74 Michael Oher T; 73 Marshal Yanda G; Defensive linemen (DL): 94 Justin Bannan DE; 93 Dwan Edwards DE; 97 Kelly Gregg NT; 99 Paul Kruger DE; 92 Haloti Ngata DE; 90 Trevor Pryce DE; 98 Kelly Talavou NT	Linebackers (LB): 50 Antwan Barnes OLB; 54 Prescott Burgess ILB; 59 Dannell Ellerbe ILB; 56 Tavares Gooden ILB; 95 Jarret Johnson OLB; 52 Ray Lewis ILB; 53 Jameel McClain ILB; 55 Terrell Suggs OLB; Defensive backs (DB): 25 Chris Carr CB; 37 Keith Fitzhugh FS; 24 Domonique Foxworth CB; 35 Corey Ivy CB; 26 Dawan Landry SS; 30 Marcus Paschal SS; 20 Ed Reed FS; 41 Frank Walker CB; 29 Cary Williams CB; 28 Tom Zbikowski FS; Special teams (ST): 7 Billy Cundiff K; 70 Matt Katula LS; 4 Sam Koch P	Practice squad: 83 Davon Drew TE; 72 Bryan Mattison G; 16 Maurice Price WR; 76 Joe Reitz T; 13 Eron Riley WR; 69 Stefan Rodgers T; 63 Nick Sundberg LS; 68 William VanDeSteeg LB; Reserve: 51 Brendon Ayanbadejo LB (IR); 96 Lamar Divens NT (IR); 40 K. J. Gerard S (IR); 32 Matt Lawrence RB (IR); 91 Brandon McKinney NT (IR); 43 Haruki Nakamura S (IR); 58 Jason Phillips LB (IR); 22 Samari Rolle CB (PUP); -- Greg Ryan C (IR); -- Lou Saucedo T (IR); 81 Marcus Smith WR (IR); 88 Quinn Sypniewski TE (PUP); 78 Adam Terry T (IR); 31 Fabian Washington CB (IR); 21 Lardarius Webb CB (IR); Rookies in italics 53 active, 15 reserve, 8 practice squad

== Staff ==
Baltimore Ravens 2009 staff
Front office: Owner – Steve Bisciotti; Minority owner – Art Modell; President – Dick Cass; general manager/Executive Vice President – Ozzie Newsome; Vice president of football administration – Pat Moriarty; Director of player personnel – Eric DeCosta; Director of pro personnel – Vincent Newsome; Director of college scouting – Joe Hortiz; Head coaches: Head coach – John Harbaugh; Head coach's assistant – Matt Weiss; Offensive coaches: Offensive coordinator – Cam Cameron; Quarterbacks – Hue Jackson; Running backs – Wilbert Montgomery; Wide receivers – Jim Hostler; Tight ends – Wade Harman; Offensive line – John Matsko; Assistant offensive line – Andy Moeller; Offensive assistant – Craig Ver Steeg; Offensive consultant – Al Saunders; Assistant to the offense – Jason Brooks	Defensive coaches: Defensive coordinator – Greg Mattison; Defensive line – Clarence Brooks; Linebackers – Vic Fangio; Defensive backs – Mark Carrier; Secondary – Chuck Pagano; Defensive assistant – Roy Anderson; Special teams coaches: Associate head coach/special teams coordinator – Jerry Rosburg; Assistant special teams – Marwan Maalouf; Kicking consultant – Randy Brown; Strength and conditioning: Strength and conditioning – Bob Rogucki; Assistant strength and conditioning – John Dunn; Assistant athletic trainer - Kevin Domboski

== Schedule ==
=== Preseason ===
Week	Date	Opponent	Result	Record	Venue	Recap
1	August 14	Washington Redskins	**W** 23–0	1–0	M&T Bank Stadium	Recap
2	August 24	New York Jets	**W** 24–23	2–0	M&T Bank Stadium	Recap
3	August 29	at Carolina Panthers	**W** 17–13	3–0	Bank of America Stadium	Recap
4	September 3	at Atlanta Falcons	**W** 20–3	4–0	Georgia Dome	Recap

=== Regular season ===
The 2009 NFL schedule was released on April 14, 2009.

Week	Date	Opponent	Result	Record	Venue	Recap
1	September 13	Kansas City Chiefs	**W** 38–24	1–0	M&T Bank Stadium	Recap
2	September 20	at San Diego Chargers	**W** 31–26	2–0	Qualcomm Stadium	Recap
3	September 27	**Cleveland Browns**	**W** 34–3	3–0	M&T Bank Stadium	Recap
4	October 4	at New England Patriots	**L** 21–27	3–1	Gillette Stadium	Recap
5	October 11	**Cincinnati Bengals**	**L** 14–17	3–2	M&T Bank Stadium	Recap
6	October 18	at Minnesota Vikings	**L** 31–33	3–3	Mall of America Field	Recap
7	Bye					
8	November 1	Denver Broncos	**W** 30–7	4–3	M&T Bank Stadium	Recap
9	November 8	at **Cincinnati Bengals**	**L** 7–17	4–4	Paul Brown Stadium	Recap
10	November 16	at **Cleveland Browns**	**W** 16–0	5–4	Cleveland Browns Stadium	Recap
11	November 22	Indianapolis Colts	**L** 15–17	5–5	M&T Bank Stadium	Recap
12	November 29	**Pittsburgh Steelers**	**W** 20–17 (OT)	6–5	M&T Bank Stadium	Recap
13	December 7	at Green Bay Packers	**L** 14–27	6–6	Lambeau Field	Recap
14	December 13	Detroit Lions	**W** 48–3	7–6	M&T Bank Stadium	Recap
15	December 20	Chicago Bears	**W** 31–7	8–6	M&T Bank Stadium	Recap
16	December 27	at **Pittsburgh Steelers**	**L** 20–23	8–7	Heinz Field	Recap
17	January 3, 2010	at Oakland Raiders	**W** 21–13	9–7	Oakland–Alameda County Coliseum	Recap

Note: Intra-division opponents are in bold text.

== Division standings ==
AFC North
	W	L	T	PCT	DIV	CONF	PF	PA	STK
^{(4)} Cincinnati Bengals	10	6	0	.625	6–0	7–5	305	291	L1
^{(6)} Baltimore Ravens	9	7	0	.563	3–3	7–5	391	261	W1
Pittsburgh Steelers	9	7	0	.563	2–4	6–6	368	324	W3
Cleveland Browns	5	11	0	.313	1–5	5–7	245	375	W4

== Game summaries ==
=== Regular season ===
==== Week 1: vs. Kansas City Chiefs ====
Week 1: Kansas City Chiefs at Baltimore Ravens – Game summary

Quarter	1	2	3	4	Total
Chiefs	0	7	7	10	24
Ravens	10	0	7	21	38

at M&T Bank Stadium, Baltimore, Maryland

- Date: September 13
- Game time: 1:00 pm. EDT
- Game weather: Partly cloudy, 76 °F (24 °C)
- Game attendance: 71,099
- Referee: Gene Steratore
- TV announcers (CBS): Ian Eagle and Rich Gannon
- Recap, Game Book

Game information

First quarter

- BAL – Stephen Hauschka 44-yard field goal, 10:19. Ravens 3–0. Drive: 9 plays, 54 yards, 3:16.
- BAL – Willis McGahee 3-yard pass from Joe Flacco (Stephen Hauschka kick), 2:04. Ravens 10–0. Drive: 13 plays, 70 yards, 6:44.

Second quarter

- KC – Jon McGraw blocked punt recovery in the end zone (Ryan Succop kick), 9:55. Ravens 10–7.

Third quarter

- KC – Dwayne Bowe 2-yard pass from Brodie Croyle (Ryan Succop kick), 8:52. Chiefs 14–10. Drive: 2 plays, 6 yards, 0:50.
- BAL – Todd Heap 9-yard pass from Joe Flacco (Stephen Hauschka kick), 3:57. Ravens 17–14. Drive: 11 plays, 64 yards, 4:55.

Fourth quarter

- KC – Ryan Succop 53-yard field goal, 11:57. Tied 17–17. Drive: 7 plays, 55 yards, 2:51.
- BAL – LeRon McClain 1-yard run (Stephen Hauschka kick), 8:10. Ravens 24–17. Drive: 9 plays, 76 yards, 3:47.
- KC – Sean Ryan 10-yard pass from Brodie Croyle (Ryan Succop kick), 5:21. Tied 24–24. Drive: 6 plays, 80 yards, 2:49.
- BAL – Mark Clayton 31-yard pass from Joe Flacco (Stephen Hauschka kick), 2:06. Ravens 31–24. Drive: 8 plays, 74 yards, 3:15.
- BAL – Willis McGahee 1-yard run (Stephen Hauschka kick), 0:31. Ravens 38–24. Drive: 4 plays, 9 yards, 1:03.

Top passers

- KC – Brodie Croyle – 16/24, 177 yards, 2 TD
- BAL – Joe Flacco – 26/43, 307 yards, 3 TD, INT

Top rushers

- KC – Larry Johnson – 11 rushes, 20 yards
- BAL – Ray Rice – 19 rushes, 108 yards

Top receivers

- KC – Mark Bradley – 4 receptions, 73 yards
- BAL – Mark Clayton – 5 receptions, 77 yards, TD

The Baltimore Ravens began the 2009 season at home for the second season in a row. They hosted the Kansas City Chiefs, who struggled to a franchise-worst 2–14 record in 2008. The Ravens dominated time of possession and offensive production throughout the game, but their special teams miscues made the game much closer than the score would indicate. The Ravens found the end zone halfway through the first quarter for their first touchdown of the season when Flacco found Willis McGahee for a 3-yard touchdown pass. The Ravens would later increase their advantage with a Stephen Hauschka field goal. In the second quarter, a special teams miscue led to Chiefs safety Jon McGraw blocking a Sam Koch punt into the end zone, where he recovered for a touchdown. Early in the third quarter, Derrick Johnson intercepted an errant Joe Flacco pass and returned it to the Ravens 3-yard line. Chiefs quarterback Brodie Croyle found standout receiver Dwayne Bowe for a touchdown three plays later. The Ravens would respond with an 11-play, five-minute drive capped off by a 9-yard touchdown to Todd Heap. After trading touchdowns halfway through the fourth quarter, the Ravens defense forced a turnover on downs and their offense capitalized with a 1-yard touchdown run by Le'Ron McClain. McGahee added an additional touchdown for the Ravens in the final minute of the game to open their season with a 38–24 win, their second successful home opener in a row. With the win, not only do the Ravens improve to 1–0, they are the only team in the AFC North to win their home opener on Kickoff Sunday; the Pittsburgh Steelers defeated the Tennessee Titans 13–10 on Kickoff Night the Thursday prior.

==== Week 2: at San Diego Chargers ====
Week 2: Baltimore Ravens at San Diego Chargers – Game summary

Quarter	1	2	3	4	Total
Ravens	7	14	7	3	31
Chargers	10	6	7	3	26

at Qualcomm Stadium, San Diego, California

- Date: September 20
- Game time: 4:15 pm. EDT
- Game weather: Sunny, 83 °F (28 °C)
- Game attendance: 66,882
- Referee: Tony Corrente
- TV announcers (CBS): Dick Enberg and Dan Fouts
- Recap, Game Book

Game information

First quarter

- SD – Darren Sproles 81-yard pass from Philip Rivers (Nate Kaeding kick), 9:18. Chargers 7–0. Drive: 6 plays, 99 yards, 2:22.
- BAL – Willis McGahee 5-yard run (Stephen Hauschka kick), 4:49. Tied 7–7. Drive: 9 plays, 68 yards, 4:29.
- SD – Nate Kaeding 29-yard field goal, 0:44. Chargers 10–7. Drive: 7 plays, 56 yards, 4:05.

Second quarter

- BAL – Willis McGahee 3-yard run (Stephen Hauschka kick), 10:50. Ravens 14–10. Drive: 11 plays, 78 yards, 4:54.
- SD – Nate Kaeding 22-yard field goal, 3:00. Ravens 14–13. Drive: 8 plays, 58 yards, 3:34.
- BAL – Kelley Washington 27-yard pass from Joe Flacco (Stephen Hauschka kick), 1:38. Ravens 21–13. Drive: 5 plays, 75 yards, 1:22.
- SD – Nate Kaeding 23-yard field goal, 0:08. Ravens 21–16. Drive: 9 plays, 37 yards, 1:30.

Third quarter

- BAL – Todd Heap 9-yard pass from Joe Flacco (Stephen Hauschka kick), 8:24. Ravens 28–16. Drive: 4 plays, 22 yards, 1:42.
- SD – Vincent Jackson 35-yard pass from Philip Rivers (Nate Kaeding kick), 2:26. Ravens 28–23. Drive: 9 plays, 60 yards, 5:58.

Fourth quarter

- SD – Nate Kaeding 25-yard field goal, 7:11. Ravens 28–26. Drive: 9 plays, 49 yards, 4:04.
- BAL – Stephen Hauschka 33-yard field goal, 2:54. Ravens 31–26. Drive: 4 plays, −2 yards, 1:34.

Top passers

- BAL – Joe Flacco – 17/26, 190 yards, 2 TD, INT
- SD – Philip Rivers – 25/45, 436 yards, 2 TD, 2 INT

Top rushers

- BAL – Willis McGahee – 15 rushes, 79 yards, 2 TD
- SD – Darren Sproles – 10 rushes, 26 yards

Top receivers

- BAL – Ray Rice – 6 receptions, 46 yards
- SD – Darren Sproles – 9 receptions, 124 yards, TD

The Chargers host the Ravens in their home debut in San Diego after a narrow escape in the second of two AFL 50th Anniversary-themed division rivalry Monday Night matchups against the Raiders in Oakland. The Chargers jumped out to an early lead when a blown coverage led to an easy 81-yard touchdown pass from Philip Rivers to Darren Sproles. The Ravens answered with Willis McGahee on a 5-yard touchdown run, but the Chargers would increase their advantage on a Nate Kaeding field goal. The offensive display would continue in the second quarter, but the Ravens touchdowns were only answered by Chargers field goals. McGahee found the end zone a second time to take the lead 14–10, but the Chargers pulled within one on the second Kaeding field goal. Flacco then found Kelley Washington for Flacco's first touchdown pass of the day and Washington's first touchdown reception as a Raven just inside the 2-minute halftime warning. Rivers led the Chargers down the field in an attempt to answer, but the drive stalled and had to settle for the third of four Kaeding field goals. In the second half, both defenses stiffened. Todd Heap would get his second touchdown catch of the season from Flacco from 9 yards out, but the Chargers responded with a 35-yard touchdown catch from Vincent Jackson. Late in the fourth quarter, interceptions from Flacco and Rivers led to trading field goals. After a Ravens punt, Rivers led the Chargers all the way down to the Ravens 15. The Chargers went for the first down on fourth down to go for the win, but Sproles was stopped by Ray Lewis five yards in the backfield, allowing the Ravens to run the clock out. With the win, not only do the Ravens improve to 2–0, the Ravens take sole possession of first place in the AFC North with the Steelers' loss to the Bears.

==== Week 3: vs. Cleveland Browns ====
Week 3: Cleveland Browns at Baltimore Ravens – Game summary

Quarter	1	2	3	4	Total
Browns	0	0	0	3	3
Ravens	10	10	7	7	34

at M&T Bank Stadium, Baltimore, Maryland

- Date: September 27
- Game time: 1:00 pm. EDT
- Game weather: Partly cloudy, 72 °F (22 °C)
- Game attendance: 70,950
- Referee: Terry McAulay
- TV announcers (CBS): Gus Johnson and Steve Tasker
- Recap, Game Book

Game information

First quarter

- BAL – Willis McGahee 7-yard run (Stephen Hauschka kick), 10:15. Ravens 7–0. Drive: 6 plays, 31 yards, 2:01.
- BAL – Stephen Hauschka 36-yard field goal, 1:16. Ravens 10–0. Drive: 12 plays, 68 yards, 6:03.

Second quarter

- BAL – Stephen Hauschka 33-yard field goal, 5:37. Ravens 13–0. Drive: 16 plays, 82 yards, 7:34.
- BAL – Willis McGahee 15-yard run (Stephen Hauschka kick), 0:55. Ravens 20–0. Drive: 8 plays, 80 yards, 2:31.

Third quarter

- BAL – Ray Rice 9-yard run (Stephen Hauschka kick), 7:32. Ravens 27–0. Drive: 4 plays, 53 yards, 1:54.

Fourth quarter

- CLE – Billy Cundiff 29-yard field goal, 14:55. Ravens 27–3. Drive: 13 plays, 66 yards, 7:37.
- BAL – Derrick Mason 72-yard pass from Joe Flacco (Stephen Hauschka kick), 8:05. Ravens 34–3. Drive: 1 play, 72 yards, 0:13.

Top passers

- CLE – Derek Anderson – 11/19, 92 yards, 3 INT
- BAL – Joe Flacco – 25/35, 342 yards, TD

Top rushers

- CLE – Jerome Harrison – 16 rushes, 52 yards
- BAL – Willis McGahee – 7 rushes, 67 yards, 2 TD

Top receivers

- CLE – Jerome Harrison – 5 receptions, 33 yards
- BAL – Derrick Mason – 5 receptions, 118 yards, TD

After another high scoring affair in San Diego, the Ravens returned to Baltimore with a one-game lead on the Steelers and Bengals and hosted their first AFC North Division game against the Cleveland Browns. (Coincidentally, the Bengals host the Steelers in divisional play in Week 3 as well.) Although this was the third consecutive high-scoring game for the Ravens, this was not a close contest. The Ravens struck early on the first of two touchdown runs from Willis McGahee and increased their advantage on a Hauschka field goal. In the second quarter, after another Hauschka field goal, McGahee found the end zone again. His second rushing touchdown leads the NFL with five. Although the Browns wanted to prove they were up to the challenge of contending with a quality football team, miscues thoroughly undid the Browns as quarterbacks Derek Anderson and Brady Quinn combined for four interceptions. Quinn was benched at the half in favor of Anderson, but Anderson was no better than his maligned counterpart. The third quarter only saw another touchdown for the Ravens, but was a special one for Ray Rice, as it was his first career NFL touchdown. The final minutes of the third quarter also saw the Browns' longest drive of the day, but as time expired in the third quarter, the Browns were stopped short of the end zone. The fourth quarter opened with the Browns' only points of the game on a field goal from Billy Cundiff, a free-agent signee since kicker Phil Dawson was inactive due to a leg injury. The final points of the contest came on the third Anderson interception, which was Ed Reed's first of the season. Flacco's touchdown was not only the longest of the season for him to date, but was the only passing touchdown all day. He hit a wide-open Derrick Mason after a blown coverage in the Browns secondary for a 72-yard touchdown. With the win, the Ravens improve to 3–0 and improve to 1–0 in the AFC North.

==== Week 4: at New England Patriots ====
Week 4: Baltimore Ravens at New England Patriots – Game summary

Quarter	1	2	3	4	Total
Ravens	7	0	7	7	21
Patriots	3	14	7	3	27

at Gillette Stadium, Foxborough, Massachusetts

- Date: October 4
- Game time: 1:00 pm. EDT
- Game weather: Cloudy, 64 °F (18 °C)
- Game attendance: 68,756
- Referee: Ron Winter
- TV announcers (CBS): Jim Nantz and Phil Simms
- Recap, Game Book

Game information

First quarter

- NE – Stephen Gostkowski 32-yard field goal, 13:34
- BAL – Derrick Mason 20-yard pass from Joe Flacco (Stephen Hauschka kick), 6:59

Second quarter

- NE – Tom Brady 1-yard run (Stephen Gostkowski kick), 14:08
- NE – Sammy Morris 12-yard run (Stephen Gostkowski kick), 3:57

Third quarter

- BAL – Dwan Edwards fumble recovery in the end zone (Stephen Hauschka kick), 6:19
- NE – Randy Moss 14-yard pass from Tom Brady (Gostkowski kick), 2:27

Fourth quarter

- BAL – Willis McGahee 13-yard pass from Joe Flacco (Stephen Hauschka kick), 14:17
- NE – Stephen Gostkowski 33-yard field goal, 7:10

Top passers

- BAL – Joe Flacco – 27/47, 264 yards, 2 TD, INT
- NE – Tom Brady – 21/32, 258 yards, TD

Top rushers

- BAL – Ray Rice – 11 rushes, 103 yards
- NE – Fred Taylor – 7 rushes, 25 yards

Top receivers

- BAL – Derrick Mason – 7 receptions, 88 yards, TD
- NE – Benjamin Watson – 2 receptions, 51 yards

Coming off their divisional home win over the Browns, the Ravens flew to Gillette Stadium for a Week 4 battle with the New England Patriots. After Patriots kicker Stephen Gostkowski got a 32-yard field goal in the first quarter, Baltimore got into the game with quarterback Joe Flacco hooking up with wide receiver Derrick Mason on a 20-yard touchdown pass. In the second quarter, New England came back with quarterback Tom Brady's 1-yard touchdown run and running back Sammy Morris' 12-yard touchdown run.

The Ravens would reply in the third quarter with defensive end Terrell Suggs sacking Brady, causing a fumble which rolled into the Patriots' endzone, where defensive end Dwan Edwards would land on it for a touchdown. New England would come right back with Brady's 14-yard touchdown pass to wide receiver Randy Moss. Baltimore would play some catch-up in the fourth quarter as Flacco found running back Willis McGahee on a 13-yard touchdown pass, but the Patriots willingly replied with Gostkowski's 33-yard field goal. Flacco would lead a last-minute drive, but New England's stiffened, stopping the Ravens on a fourth down deep in Patriots' territory to preserve the win.

With the tough loss, the Ravens fell to 3–1.

==== Week 5: vs. Cincinnati Bengals ====
Week 5: Cincinnati Bengals at Baltimore Ravens – Game summary

Quarter	1	2	3	4	Total
Bengals	0	3	7	7	17
Ravens	0	7	0	7	14

at M&T Bank Stadium, Baltimore, Maryland

- Date: October 11
- Game time: 1:00 pm. EDT
- Game weather: Sunny, 64 °F (18 °C)
- Game attendance: 71,161
- Referee: Jeff Triplette
- TV announcers (CBS): Gus Johnson and Steve Tasker
- Recap, Game Book

Game information

First quarter

- No scoring plays.

Second quarter

- BAL – Ed Reed 52-yard interception return (Stephen Hauschka kick), 12:17
- CIN – Shayne Graham 33-yard field goal, 10:11

Third quarter

- CIN – Cedric Benson 28-yard run (Shayne Graham kick), 0:52

Fourth quarter

- BAL – Ray Rice 48-yard pass from Joe Flacco (Stephen Hauschka kick), 6:59
- CIN – Andre Caldwell 20-yard pass from Carson Palmer (Shayne Graham kick), 0:22

Top passers

- CIN – Carson Palmer – 18/31, 271 yards, TD, INT
- BAL – Joe Flacco – 22/31, 186 yards, TD, 2 INT

Top rushers

- CIN – Cedric Benson – 27 rushes, 120 yards, TD
- BAL – Ray Rice – 14 rushes, 69 yards

Top receivers

- CIN – Chad Ochocinco – 7 receptions, 94 yards
- BAL – Ray Rice – 7 receptions, 74 yards, TD

Hoping to rebound from their tough road loss to the Patriots, the Ravens went home for a Week 5 AFC North duel with the Cincinnati Bengals. The winner would take the lead in the division after five weeks.

After a scoreless first quarter, Baltimore's defense went to work in the second quarter with safety Ed Reed returning an interception 52 yards for a touchdown. The Bengals would answer with a 32-yard field goal from kicker Shayne Graham. Near the end of the third quarter, Cincinnati would take the lead on a 28-yard touchdown run from running back Cedric Benson. The Ravens would respond in the fourth quarter as quarterback Joe Flacco hooked up with running back Ray Rice 48-yard touchdown pass. However, late in the game, the Bengals would deliver the final strike as quarterback Carson Palmer completed a 20-yard touchdown pass to wide receiver Andre Caldwell. Baltimore tried to rally, but an interception from cornerback Leon Hall eliminated any chance of a comeback.

With the loss, the Ravens fell to 3–2.

Also, the defense's 40-game streak of keeping a single rusher under 100 yards was snapped. The last time that Baltimore allowed a 100-yard rusher was Dec. 10, 2006 against the Chiefs' Larry Johnson.

==== Week 6: at Minnesota Vikings ====
Week 6: Baltimore Ravens at Minnesota Vikings – Game summary

Quarter	1	2	3	4	Total
Ravens	0	3	7	21	31
Vikings	14	0	6	13	33

at Hubert H. Humphrey Metrodome, Minneapolis, Minnesota

- Date: October 18
- Game time: 1:00 pm. EDT
- Game weather: None (indoor stadium)
- Game attendance: 63,689
- Referee: Mike Carey
- TV announcers (CBS): Greg Gumbel and Dan Dierdorf
- Recap, Game Book

Game information

First quarter

- MIN – Visanthe Shiancoe 19-yard pass from Brett Favre (Ryan Longwell kick), 11:25
- MIN – Bernard Berrian 4-yard pass from Brett Favre (Ryan Longwell kick), 6:16

Second quarter

- BAL – Stephen Hauschka 29-yard field goal, 0:02

Third quarter

- MIN – Ryan Longwell 40-yard field goal, 7:16
- BAL – Ray Rice 22-yard run (Stephen Hauschka kick), 4:13
- MIN – Ryan Longwell 22-yard field goal, 2:05

Fourth quarter

- MIN – Visanthe Shiancoe 1-yard pass from Brett Favre (Ryan Longwell kick), 10:08
- BAL – Mark Clayton 32-yard pass from Joe Flacco (Stephen Hauschka kick), 8:35
- MIN – Ryan Longwell 29-yard field goal, 6:01
- BAL – Derrick Mason 12-yard pass from Joe Flacco (Stephen Hauschka kick), 5:12
- BAL – Ray Rice 33-yard run (Stephen Hauschka kick), 3:37
- MIN – Ryan Longwell 31-yard field goal, 1:56

Top passers

- BAL – Joe Flacco – 28/43, 385 yards, 2 TD
- MIN – Brett Favre – 21/29, 278 yards, 3 TD

Top rushers

- BAL – Ray Rice – 10 rushes, 77 yards, 2 TD
- MIN – Adrian Peterson – 22 rushes, 143 yards

Top receivers

- BAL – Ray Rice – 10 receptions, 117 yards
- MIN – Sidney Rice – 6 receptions, 176 yards

Trying to snap a two-game losing streak, the Ravens flew to the Hubert H. Humphrey Metrodome for a Week 6 interconference duel with the Minnesota Vikings. Baltimore would trail in the first quarter as Vikings quarterback Brett Favre completed a 19-yard touchdown pass to tight end Visanthe Shiancoe and a 4-yard touchdown pass to wide receiver Bernard Berrian. Afterwards, the Ravens would snag the only points of the second quarter with kicker Stephen Hauschka making a 29-yard field goal.

In the third quarter, Minnesota would extend its lead as kicker Ryan Longwell nailed a 40-yard field goal. Baltimore would come right back into the game with running back Ray Rice's 22-yard touchdown run, but Longwell helped out the Vikings with a 22-yard field goal. In a nerve-wracking fourth quarter, Minnesota increased its lead with Favre finding Shiancoe again on a 1-yard touchdown run. The Ravens would respond with quarterback Joe Flacco's 32-yard touchdown pass to wide receiver Mark Clayton. After Longwell gave the Vikings a 29-yard field goal, Baltimore would take the lead as Flacco completed a 12-yard touchdown pass to wide receiver Derrick Mason and Rice getting a 33-yard touchdown run. Minnesota would regain the lead as Longwell booted a 31-yard field goal. Flacco would get the Ravens into scoring range, but Hauschka's 44-yard field goal attempt sailed wide left, preserving the Vikings' so-far perfect season.

With the loss, Baltimore went into its bye week at 3–3.

This also marked the first time that the Ravens defense allowed back-to-back 100-yard rushers since 2005 (Bengals' Rudi Johnson and Texans' Domanick Williams).

==== Week 8: vs. Denver Broncos ====
Week 8: Denver Broncos at Baltimore Ravens – Game summary

Quarter	1	2	3	4	Total
Broncos	0	0	7	0	7
Ravens	3	3	10	14	30

at M&T Bank Stadium, Baltimore, Maryland

- Date: November 1
- Game time: 1:00 pm. EST
- Game weather: Cloudy, 56 °F (13 °C)
- Game attendance: 71,132
- Referee: Walt Coleman
- TV announcers (CBS): Greg Gumbel and Dan Dierdorf
- Recap, Game Book

Game information

First quarter

- BAL – Stephen Hauschka 43-yard field goal, 0:56

Second quarter

- BAL – Stephen Hauschka 35-yard field goal, 4:58

Third quarter

- BAL – Lardarius Webb 95-yard kickoff return (Stephen Hauschka kick), 14:46
- DEN – Knowshon Moreno 1-yard run (Matt Prater kick), 9:46
- BAL – Stephen Hauschka 31-yard field goal, 4:55

Fourth quarter

- BAL – Derrick Mason 20-yard pass from Joe Flacco (Stephen Hauschka kick), 13:07
- BAL – Ray Rice 7-yard run (Stephen Hauschka kick), 1:59

Top passers

- DEN – Kyle Orton – 23/37, 152 yards
- BAL – Joe Flacco – 20/25, 175 yards, TD

Top rushers

- DEN – Knowshon Moreno – 10 rushes, 39 yards, TD
- BAL – Ray Rice – 23 rushes, 84 yards, TD

Top receivers

- DEN – Jabar Gaffney – 3 receptions, 43 yards
- BAL – Kelley Washington – 4 receptions, 58 yards

Coming off their bye week, the Ravens went home for a Week 8 duel with the undefeated Denver Broncos. Baltimore took flight in the first half with kicker Stephen Hauschka nailing a 43-yard field goal in the first quarter and a 35-yard field goal in the second quarter. The Ravens would immediately make their domination felt in the third quarter as rookie cornerback Lardarius Webb returned the second half's opening kickoff 95 yards for a touchdown. The Broncos would get on the board with running back Knowshon Moreno getting a 1-yard touchdown run, yet Baltimore answered with Hauschka booting a 31-yard field goal. Afterwards, the Ravens closed the game out in the fourth quarter as quarterback Joe Flacco found wide receiver Derrick Mason on a 20-yard touchdown pass, while running back Ray Rice got a 7-yard touchdown run.

With the win, Baltimore improved to 4–3.

==== Week 9: at Cincinnati Bengals ====
Week 9: Baltimore Ravens at Cincinnati Bengals – Game summary

Quarter	1	2	3	4	Total
Ravens	0	0	0	7	7
Bengals	14	3	0	0	17

at Paul Brown Stadium, Cincinnati, Ohio

- Date: November 8
- Game time: 1:00 pm. EST
- Game weather: Sunny, 67 °F (19 °C)
- Game attendance: 64,313
- Referee: Alberto Riveron
- TV announcers (CBS): Dick Enberg and Dan Fouts
- Recap, Game Book

Game information

First quarter

- CIN – Andre Caldwell 6-yard pass from Carson Palmer (Shayne Graham kick), 8:55
- CIN – Cedric Benson 1-yard run (Shayne Graham kick), 2:23

Second quarter

- CIN – Shayne Graham 23-yard field goal, 7:45

Third quarter

- No scoring plays.

Fourth quarter

- BAL – Ray Rice 2-yard run (Stephen Hauschka kick), 12:54

Top passers

- BAL – Joe Flacco – 18/32, 195 yards, 2 INT
- CIN – Carson Palmer – 20/33, 224 yards, TD

Top rushers

- BAL – Ray Rice – 12 rushes, 48 yards, TD
- CIN – Cedric Benson – 34 rushes, 117 yards, TD

Top receivers

- BAL – Ray Rice – 8 receptions, 87 yards
- CIN – Laveranues Coles – 6 receptions, 72 yards

Coming off their dominating home win over the Broncos, the Ravens flew to Paul Brown Stadium for a Week 9 AFC North rematch with the Cincinnati Bengals. Baltimore would trail in the first quarter as Bengals quarterback Carson Palmer completed a 6-yard touchdown pass to wide receiver Andre Caldwell, followed by running back Cedric Benson getting a 1-yard touchdown run. Cincinnati would increase their lead in the second quarter as kicker Shayne Graham booted a 23-yard field goal. After a scoreless third quarter, the Ravens got on the board with a 2-yard touchdown run from running back Ray Rice. However, the Bengals' defense would stop any further progress from Baltimore.

With the loss, the Ravens fell to 4–4.

==== Week 10: at Cleveland Browns ====
Week 10: Baltimore Ravens at Cleveland Browns – Game summary

Quarter	1	2	3	4	Total
Ravens	0	0	16	0	16
Browns	0	0	0	0	0

at Cleveland Browns Stadium, Cleveland, Ohio

- Date: November 16
- Game time: 8:30 pm. EDT
- Game weather: Chilly, 46 °F (8 °C)
- Game attendance: 69,023
- Referee: Carl Cheffers
- TV announcers (ESPN): Mike Tirico, Ron Jaworski, Jon Gruden and Michele Tafoya
- Recap, Game Book

Game information

First quarter

- No scoring plays.

Second quarter

- No scoring plays.

Third quarter

- BAL – Ray Rice 13-yard run (Stephen Hauschka kick), 12:35
- BAL – Dawan Landry 41-yard interception return (kick blocked), 12:20
- BAL – Stephen Hauschka 44-yard field goal, 7:25

Fourth quarter

- No scoring plays.

Top passers

- BAL – Joe Flacco – 13/18, 155 yards
- CLE – Brady Quinn – 13/31, 99 yards, 2 INT

Top rushers

- BAL – Ray Rice – 20 rushes, 89 yards, TD
- CLE – Jamal Lewis – 10 rushes, 36 yards

Top receivers

- BAL – Derrick Mason – 3 receptions, 78 yards
- CLE – Mohamed Massaquoi – 1 reception, 30 yards

Hoping to rebound from their season-sweeping losses to the Bengals, the Ravens flew to Cleveland Browns Stadium for a Week 10 Monday night duel with their AFC North rival, the Cleveland Browns. After a scoreless first half, Baltimore acquired all of their points in the third quarter. It began with running back Ray Rice getting a 13-yard touchdown run, safety Dawan Landry returning an interception 48 yards for a touchdown and kicker Stephen Hauschka booting a 44-yard field goal. Afterwards, the defense consistently shut down the Browns' inept offense.

With the win, the Ravens improved to 5–4.

==== Week 11: vs. Indianapolis Colts ====
Week 11: Indianapolis Colts at Baltimore Ravens – Game summary

Quarter	1	2	3	4	Total
Colts	7	7	0	3	17
Ravens	6	6	0	3	15

at M&T Bank Stadium, Baltimore, Maryland

- Date: November 22
- Game time: 1:00 pm. EST
- Game weather: Sunny, 56 °F (13 °C)
- Game attendance: 71,320
- Referee: John Parry
- TV announcers (CBS): Greg Gumbel and Dan Dierdorf
- Recap, Game Book

Game information

First quarter

- IND – Dallas Clark 3-yard pass from Peyton Manning (Matt Stover kick), 11:24
- BAL – Billy Cundiff 46-yard field goal, 5:09
- BAL – Billy Cundiff 44-yard field goal, 4:01

Second quarter

- BAL – Billy Cundiff 38-yard field goal, 4:43
- IND – Joseph Addai 5-yard run (Matt Stover kick), 1:23
- BAL – Billy Cundiff 36-yard field goal, 0:02

Third quarter

- No scoring plays.

Fourth quarter

- BAL – Billy Cundiff 20-yard field goal, 10:12
- IND – Matt Stover 25-yard field goal, 7:02

Top passers

- IND – Peyton Manning – 22/31, 299 yards, TD, 2 INT
- BAL – Joe Flacco – 23/35, 256 yards, INT

Top rushers

- IND – Joseph Addai – 19 rushes, 74 yards, TD
- BAL – Ray Rice – 20 rushes, 71 yards

Top receivers

- IND – Pierre Garçon – 6 receptions, 108 yards
- BAL – Derrick Mason – 9 receptions, 142 yards

Coming off their shutout road win over the Browns, the Ravens went home for a Week 11 duel with the Indianapolis Colts. Baltimore would trail in the first quarter as Colts quarterback Peyton Manning threw a 1-yard touchdown pass to tight end Dallas Clark. The Ravens would answer with recently signed kicker Billy Cundiff (after Stephen Hauschka was cut) making a 46-yard and a 44-yard field goal. Baltimore would take the lead in the second quarter with Cundiff's 38-yard field goal, but Indianapolis would answer with a 5-yard touchdown run from running back Joseph Addai. The Ravens would close out the half with Cundiff nailing a 36-yard field goal. After a scoreless third quarter, Baltimore regained the lead again in the fourth quarter with a 20-yard field goal from Cundiff, but the Colts would get the last laugh as former Ravens kicker Matt Stover booted a 25-yard field goal.

With the loss, Baltimore fell to 5–5.

==== Week 12: vs. Pittsburgh Steelers ====
Week 12: Pittsburgh Steelers at Baltimore Ravens – Game summary

Quarter	1	2	3	4	OT	Total
Steelers	0	7	3	7	0	17
Ravens	7	7	0	3	3	20

at M&T Bank Stadium, Baltimore, Maryland

- Date: November 29
- Game time: 8:20 pm. EST
- Game weather: Clear, 61 °F (16 °C)
- Game attendance: 71,314
- Referee: Ed Hochuli
- TV announcers (NBC): Al Michaels, Cris Collinsworth and Andrea Kremer
- Recap, Game Book

Game information

First quarter

- BAL – Willis McGahee 2-yard run (Billy Cundiff kick), 2:00

Second quarter

- PIT – Santonio Holmes 33-yard pass from Dennis Dixon (Jeff Reed kick), 3:37
- BAL – Derrick Mason 10-yard pass from Joe Flacco (Billy Cundiff kick), 2:26

Third quarter

- PIT – Jeff Reed 44-yard field goal, 1:40

Fourth quarter

- PIT – Dennis Dixon 24-yard run (Reed kick), 5:09
- BAL – Billy Cundiff 24-yard field goal, 4:33

Overtime

- BAL – Billy Cundiff 29-yard field goal, 3:23

Top passers

- PIT – Dennis Dixon – 12/26, 145 yards, TD, INT
- BAL – Joe Flacco – 23/39, 289 yards, TD

Top rushers

- PIT – Rashard Mendenhall – 24 rushes, 95 yards
- BAL – Ray Rice – 19 rushes, 88 yards

Top receivers

- PIT – Santonio Holmes – 6 receptions, 74 yards, TD
- BAL – Mark Clayton – 7 receptions, 129 yards

Following a close loss to the Colts the prior week, the much-hated Steelers came to town for a rematch of last year's AFC Championship Game. Steelers starting QB Ben Roethlisberger, who suffered a concussion in the previous week's overtime loss to the Chiefs did not start and was the designated third-string quarterback. Backup Charlie Batch also was hurt in that game, which left second-year QB Dennis Dixon, who previously had one pass in his NFL career, to start. The Steelers received the opening kickoff, but went three-and-out. On the ensuing possession, the Ravens drove down the field with ease, capping off their drive with a touchdown run by Willis McGahee. In the second quarter, Dixon hit WR Santonio Holmes on a play-action pass for a 33-yard touchdown, tying the game. The Ravens answered on the following drive, with a 52-yard strike from Joe Flacco to Mark Clayton, setting up a 10-yard touchdown pass to Derrick Mason. In the third quarter, on the Ravens opening possession, Clayton made a 9-yard reception but fumbled the ball. The ball was kicked 20 yards towards the Steelers endzone by a Pittsburgh player, but recovered by Tyrone Carter. The Steelers drove, but were held to a field goal by Jeff Reed. Later in the fourth quarter, Joe Flacco was sacked by Lawrence Timmons and fumbled the ball, recovered by the Steelers near midfield. The drive resulted in a 24-yard run on a QB option by Dixon, giving the Steelers their first lead of the night. On the Ravens next possession, things were looking bad when the offense was facing a third-and-22 with around three minutes left. Joe Flacco completed a pass to Derrick Mason for 17 yards, leaving John Harbaugh with a critical decision. Harbaugh opted to go for it and Joe Flacco found Ray Rice for a 44-yard reception, setting the Ravens up inside the Steeler 10-yard line with less than 2 minutes left. Billy Cundiff tied the game with a 24-yard field goal. On the following Steeler possession, Dennis Dixon was nearly intercepted by Lardarius Webb. The Steelers were forced to punt, giving the ball back to the Ravens with about 1:30 left in the game. A very good punt return into Steeler territory by Chris Carr was wiped off by a block in the back. Despite the setback, the Ravens managed to drive to the Steeler 40-yard line, where their drive stalled. On third-and-9 with 25 seconds left, Joe Flacco was sacked and fumbled, but the ball was recovered by Ben Grubbs. With the clock counting inside 10 seconds left and no timeouts, the field goal team managed to get into formation and get the kick off. The 56-yard attempt by Billy Cundiff was dead center, but about 2 yards short. In overtime, the Steelers won the toss and got the ball, but were forced to punt. The Ravens, also forced to punt deep in their own territory, gave the ball to Pittsburgh around the Steeler 40-yard line. On a third-and-5, Dennis Dixon threw an interception to LB Paul Kruger, who returned the ball 26 yards to the Steeler 28-yard line. Already in field goal range, the Ravens ran the ball down to the Pittsburgh 11-yard line where Billy Cundiff made a 29-yard field goal to win the game.

With the win, both teams' records is 6–5. The Ravens hold the final wild card seed in the AFC due to the head-to-head tiebreaker over Pittsburgh.

==== Week 13: at Green Bay Packers ====
Week 13: Baltimore Ravens at Green Bay Packers – Game summary

Quarter	1	2	3	4	Total
Ravens	0	0	14	0	14
Packers	3	14	0	10	27

at Lambeau Field, Green Bay, Wisconsin

- Date: December 7
- Game time: 8:30 pm. EDT
- Game weather: Mostly clear, 21 °F (−6 °C)
- Game attendance: 70,286
- Referee: Walt Anderson
- TV announcers (ESPN): Mike Tirico, Ron Jaworski, Jon Gruden and Michele Tafoya
- Recap, Game Book

Game information

First quarter

- GB – Mason Crosby 28-yard field goal, 8:43

Second quarter

- GB – Jermichael Finley 2-yard pass from Aaron Rodgers (Mason Crosby kick), 4:39
- GB – Donald Driver 8-yard pass from Aaron Rodgers (Mason Crosby kick), 0:38

Third quarter

- BAL – Kelley Washington 12-yard pass from Joe Flacco (Billy Cundiff kick), 3:35
- BAL – Willis McGahee 1-yard run (Billy Cundiff kick), 3:01

Fourth quarter

- GB – Jermichael Finley 19-yard pass from Aaron Rodgers (Mason Crosby kick), 10:38
- GB – Mason Crosby 32-yard field goal, 2:00

Top passers

- BAL – Joe Flacco – 15/36, 137 yards, TD, 3 INT
- GB – Aaron Rodgers – 26/40, 263 yards, 3 TD, 2 INT

Top rushers

- BAL – Ray Rice – 14 rushes, 54 yards
- GB – Ryan Grant – 18 rushes, 41 yards

Top receivers

- BAL – Todd Heap – 5 receptions, 52 yards
- GB – Jermichael Finley – 7 receptions, 79 yards, 2 TD

With injuries to Ed Reed and Mark Clayton, both the offense and defense failed to play up to standards and the team endured another painful defeat. With the loss, the Ravens fell to 6–6.

==== Week 14: vs Detroit Lions ====
Week 14: Detroit Lions at Baltimore Ravens – Game summary

Quarter	1	2	3	4	Total
Lions	0	3	0	0	3
Ravens	3	17	21	7	48

at M&T Bank Stadium, Baltimore, Maryland

- Date: December 13
- Game time: 1:00 pm. EDT
- Game weather: Rain, 36 °F (2 °C)
- Game attendance: 70,673
- Referee: Don Carey
- TV announcers (Fox): Chris Myers and Tim Ryan
- Recap, Game Book

Game information

First quarter

- BAL – Billy Cundiff 38-yard field goal, 0:40

Second quarter

- BAL – Mason 62-yard pass from Joe Flacco (Billy Cundiff kick), 11:56
- DET – Hanson 22-yard field goal, 4:32
- BAL – Ray Rice 1-yard run (Cundiff kick), 3:32
- BAL – Billy Cundiff 25-yard field goal, 1:10

Third quarter

- BAL – McClain 3-yard run (Cundiff kick), 8:50
- BAL – Willis McGahee 8-yard run (Cundiff kick), 4:16
- BAL – Willis McGahee 19-yard run (Cundiff kick), 0:51

Fourth quarter

- BAL – Smith 15-yard run (Cundiff kick), 5:02

Top passers

- DET – Daunte Culpepper – 16/34, 135 yards, INT
- BAL – Joe Flacco – 13/20, 230 yards, TD

Top rushers

- DET – Kevin Smith – 21 rushes, 69 yards
- BAL – Ray Rice – 13 rushes, 166 yards, TD

Top receivers

- DET – Dennis Northcutt – 3 receptions, 39 yards
- BAL – Derrick Mason – 5 receptions, 94 yards, TD

With the win, the Ravens improved to 7–6 and allowed them outright second place in the AFC North with the Steelers' loss to the Browns. Also, the Ravens would set a record of most points scored in a single game until Week 10 of the 2012 season when they defeated the Raiders scoring 55 points against them.

==== Week 15: vs Chicago Bears ====
Week 15: Chicago Bears at Baltimore Ravens – Game summary

Quarter	1	2	3	4	Total
Bears	0	7	0	0	7
Ravens	14	0	17	0	31

at M&T Bank Stadium, Baltimore, Maryland

- Date: December 20
- Game time: 4:15 pm. EDT
- Game weather: Clear, 32 °F (0 °C)
- Game attendance: 71,011
- Referee: Bill Leavy
- TV announcers (Fox): Thom Brennaman and Brian Billick
- Recap, Game Book

Game information

First quarter

- BAL – Todd Heap 14-yard pass from Joe Flacco (Billy Cundiff kick), 11:59
- BAL – Todd Heap 7-yard pass from Joe Flacco (Billy Cundiff kick), 2:20

Second quarter

- CHI – Earl Bennett 49-yard punt return (Robbie Gould kick), 5:45

Third quarter

- BAL – Demetrius Williams 32-yard pass from Joe Flacco (Billy Cundiff kick), 12:24
- BAL – Derrick Mason 18-yard pass from Joe Flacco (Billy Cundiff kick), 10:20
- BAL – Billy Cundiff 40-yard field goal, 7:55

Fourth quarter

- No scoring plays.

Top passers

- CHI – Jay Cutler – 10/27, 94 yards, 3 INT
- BAL – Joe Flacco – 21/29, 234 yards, 4 TD

Top rushers

- CHI – Matt Forte – 20 rushes, 69 yards
- BAL – Ray Rice – 16 rushes, 87 yards

Top receivers

- CHI – Earl Bennett – 2 receptions, 50 yards
- BAL – Derrick Mason – 6 receptions, 87 yards, TD

With the win, the Ravens improved to 8–6.

==== Week 16: at Pittsburgh Steelers ====
Week 16: Baltimore Ravens at Pittsburgh Steelers – Game summary

Quarter	1	2	3	4	Total
Ravens	3	7	10	0	20
Steelers	6	14	0	3	23

at Heinz Field, Pittsburgh, Pennsylvania

- Date: December 27
- Game time: 1:00 pm. EDT
- Game weather: Mostly cloudy, 39 °F (4 °C)
- Game attendance: 64,068
- Referee: Pete Morelli
- TV announcers (CBS): Dick Enberg and Dan Fouts
- Recap, Game Book

Game information

First quarter

- PIT – Jeff Reed 26-yard field goal, 9:21
- BAL – Billy Cundiff 27-yard field goal, 5:18
- PIT – Jeff Reed 39-yard field goal, 1:09

Second quarter

- PIT – Rashard Mendenhall 4-yard run (Jeff Reed kick), 12:52
- BAL – Todd Heap 30-yard pass from Joe Flacco (Billy Cundiff kick), 9:55
- PIT – Santonio Holmes 24-yard pass from Ben Roethlisberger (Jeff Reed kick), 0:35

Third quarter

- BAL – Todd Heap 7-yard pass from Joe Flacco (Billy Cundiff kick), 9:30
- BAL – Billy Cundiff 35-yard field goal, 6:16

Fourth quarter

- PIT – Jeff Reed 38-yard field goal, 5:25

Top passers

- BAL – Joe Flacco – 13/25, 166 yards, 2 TD, INT
- PIT – Ben Roethlisberger – 17/33, 259 yards, TD, INT

Top rushers

- BAL – Ray Rice – 30 rushes, 141 yards
- PIT – Rashard Mendenhall – 17 rushes, 36 yards, TD

Top receivers

- BAL – Derrick Mason – 7 receptions, 77 yards
- PIT – Santonio Holmes – 5 receptions, 86 yards, TD

Even with the loss to the Steelers, the Ravens playoff hopes were not yet vanished. All the Ravens needed was a win the following against the Oakland Raiders to clinch a playoff berth. The loss dropped the team to 8–7.

==== Week 17: at Oakland Raiders ====
Week 17: Baltimore Ravens at Oakland Raiders – Game summary

Quarter	1	2	3	4	Total
Ravens	7	7	0	7	21
Raiders	0	10	3	0	13

at Oakland–Alameda County Coliseum, Oakland, California

- Date: January 3
- Game time: 4:15 pm. EDT
- Game weather: Sunny, 54 °F (12 °C)
- Game attendance: 38,400
- Referee: Tony Corrente
- TV announcers (CBS): Jim Nantz and Phil Simms
- Recap, Game Book

Game information

First quarter

- BAL – Willis McGahee 2-yard run (Billy Cundiff kick), 3:47

Second quarter

- OAK – Sebastian Janikowski 37-yard field goal, 14:49
- BAL – Willis McGahee 77-yard run (Billy Cundiff kick), 3:54
- OAK – Zach Miller 12-yard pass from Charlie Frye (Sebastian Janikowski kick), 0:47

Third quarter

- OAK – Sebastian Janikowski 39-yard field goal, 4:06

Fourth quarter

- BAL – Willis McGahee 2-yard run (Billy Cundiff kick), 13:16

Top passers

- BAL – Joe Flacco – 11/19, 102 yards
- OAK – Charlie Frye – 18/25, 180 yards, TD

Top rushers

- BAL – Willis McGahee – 16 rushes, 167 yards, 3 TD
- OAK – Michael Bush – 10 rushes, 18 yards

Top receivers

- BAL – Todd Heap – 2 receptions, 40 yards
- OAK – Chaz Schilens – 8 receptions, 99 yards

This victory allowed the dethroning of the defending world champion Pittsburgh Steelers and ending the latter team's run at a repeat title. In turn, the Ravens got their Wild Card spot.

=== Postseason ===
Round	Date	Opponent (seed)	Result	Record	Venue	Recap
Wild Card	January 10, 2010	at New England Patriots (3)	W 33–14	1–0	Gillette Stadium	Recap
Divisional	January 16, 2010	at Indianapolis Colts (1)	L 3–20	1–1	Lucas Oil Stadium	Recap

==== AFC Wild Card Round: at New England Patriots ====
AFC Wild Card Round: Baltimore Ravens at New England Patriots – Game summary

Quarter	1	2	3	4	Total
Ravens	24	0	3	6	33
Patriots	0	7	7	0	14

at Gillette Stadium, Foxborough, Massachusetts

- Date: January 10
- Game time: 1:00 pm. EDT
- Game weather: Sunny, 20 °F (−7 °C)
- Game attendance: 68,756
- Referee: Gene Steratore
- TV announcers (CBS): Jim Nantz and Phil Simms
- Recap, Game Book

Game information

First quarter

- BAL – Ray Rice 83-yard run (Billy Cundiff kick), 14:43. Ravens 7–0. Drive: 1 play, 83 yards, 0:17.
- BAL – Le'Ron McClain 1-yard run (Billy Cundiff kick), 10:29. Ravens 14–0. Drive: 5 plays, 17 yards, 2:44.
- BAL – Ray Rice 1-yard run (Billy Cundiff kick), 3:55. Ravens 21–0. Drive: 6 plays, 25 yards, 2:54.
- BAL – Billy Cundiff 27-yard field goal, 1:19. Ravens 24–0. Drive: 4 plays, 0 yards, 1:37.

Second quarter

- NE – Julian Edelman 6-yard pass from Tom Brady (Stephen Gostkowski kick), 11:23. Ravens 24–7. Drive: 6 plays, 16 yards, 2:45.

Third quarter

- BAL – Billy Cundiff 23-yard field goal, 6:18. Ravens 27–7. Drive: 6 plays, 18 yards, 3:31.
- NE – Julian Edelman 1-yard pass from Tom Brady (Stephen Gostkowski kick), 1:47. Ravens 27–14. Drive: 10 plays, 53 yards, 4:31.

Fourth quarter

- BAL – Willis McGahee 3-yard run (run failed), 10:32. Ravens 33–14. Drive: 12 plays, 52 yards, 6:15.

Top passers

- NE – Tom Brady – 23/42, 154 yards, 2 TD, 3 INT
- BAL – Joe Flacco – 4/10, 34 yards, INT

Top rushers

- NE – Kevin Faulk – 14 rushes, 52 yards
- BAL – Ray Rice – 22 rushes, 159 yards, 2 TD

Top receivers

- NE – Randy Moss – 5 receptions, 48 yards
- BAL – Mark Clayton – 1 reception, 17 yards

Entering the postseason as the AFC's sixth seed, the Ravens began their playoff run at Gillette Stadium in the AFC Wild Card round against the #3 seeded New England Patriots. This game was a rematch of their game played during Week 4 of the 2009 season. The Ravens drew first blood as Ray Rice took the handoff from Flacco and ran through a hole in the defense on his way to an 83-yard touchdown on the first offensive play of the game. It was the longest rush of his career and the second longest rush in NFL postseason history. Less than two minutes later, LB and DE Terrell Suggs, forced a fumble from New England quarterback Tom Brady's hand on a third-and-11 pass attempt and recovered for the Ravens on the New England 17. Le'Ron McClain then capped a five-play Ravens scoring drive with a 2-yard touchdown plunge, extending the lead to 14–0. The Ravens capitalized on another New England miscue when cornerback Chris Carr intercepted a Tom Brady pass. After a 6-play, 26-yard drive, Ray Rice hopped into the end-zone for his second touchdown of the quarter. On the Patriots very next possession, another Tom Brady pass was intercepted by safety Ed Reed. Reed took the interception and returned it 25 yards before handing it off to Dawan Landry, who took it another 25 yards. This led to a Ravens field goal and a 24–0 first-quarter lead. The Ravens went on to defeat the Patriots by a final score of 33–14. The Ravens would advance to face the top-seeded Colts in the Divisional Round.

==== AFC Divisional Round: at Indianapolis Colts ====
AFC Divisional Round: Baltimore Ravens at Indianapolis Colts – Game summary

Quarter	1	2	3	4	Total
Ravens	3	0	0	0	3
Colts	3	14	0	3	20

at Lucas Oil Stadium, Indianapolis, Indiana

- Date: January 16
- Game time: 8:15 pm. EDT
- Game weather: None (indoor stadium)
- Game attendance: 67,535
- Referee: Carl Cheffers
- TV announcers (CBS): Greg Gumbel and Dan Dierdorf
- Recap, Game Book

Game information

First quarter

- IND – Matt Stover 44-yard field goal, 10:44. Colts 3–0. Drive: 10 plays, 54 yards, 4:16.
- BAL – Billy Cundiff 25-yard field goal, 2:57. Tied 3–3. Drive: 15 plays, 87 yards, 7:47.

Second quarter

- IND – Austin Collie 10-yard pass from Peyton Manning (Matt Stover kick), 2:00. Colts 10–3. Drive: 14 plays, 75 yards, 8:00.
- IND – Reggie Wayne 3-yard pass from Peyton Manning (Matt Stover kick), 0:03. Colts 17–3. Drive: 8 plays, 64 yards, 1:23.

Third quarter

- No scoring plays.

Fourth quarter

- IND – Matt Stover 33-yard field goal, 13:26. Colts 20–3. Drive: 14 plays, 56 yards, 7:21.

Top passers

- IND – Peyton Manning – 30/44, 246 yards, 2 TD, INT
- BAL – Joe Flacco – 20/35, 189 yards, 2 INT

Top rushers

- IND – Joseph Addai – 11 rushes, 23 yards
- BAL – Ray Rice – 13 rushes, 67 yards

Top receivers

- IND – Reggie Wayne – 8 receptions, 63 yards, TD
- BAL – Ray Rice – 9 receptions, 60 yards

Coming off their impressive road win over the Patriots in the Wild Card round, the Ravens flew to Lucas Oil Stadium for the AFC Divisional Round against the top-seeded Indianapolis Colts. Baltimore would trail to begin the first quarter as former Ravens kicker Matt Stover got a 44-yard field goal. The Ravens would respond with kicker Billy Cundiff making a 25-yard field goal. However, the Colts rebounded in the second quarter as quarterback Peyton Manning completed a 10-yard touchdown pass to wide receiver Austin Collie and a 3-yard touchdown pass to wide receiver Reggie Wayne. Following a scoreless third quarter, Baltimore's deficit increased in the fourth quarter as Stover gave Indianapolis a 33-yard field goal.

With the loss, the Ravens' season ended with an overall record of 10–8.
