= Matt Katula =

American football player (born 1982)

No. 70, 48
- Position: Long snapper

Personal information
- Born: August 22, 1982 (age 44); Brookfield, Wisconsin, U.S.
- Listed height: 6 ft 6 in (1.98 m)
- Listed weight: 265 lb (120 kg)

Career information
- High school: Catholic Memorial (Waukesha, Wisconsin)
- College: Wisconsin
- NFL draft: 2005: undrafted

Career history
- Baltimore Ravens (2005–2009); New England Patriots (2010); Minnesota Vikings (2011); Pittsburgh Steelers (2012)*
- * Offseason or practice squad member only

Career NFL statistics
- Games played: 93
- Total tackles: 19
- Stats at Pro Football Reference

Matthew Charles Katula (born August 22, 1982) is an American former professional football player who was a long snapper in the National Football League (NFL). He played college football for the Wisconsin Badgers and was signed by the Baltimore Ravens as undrafted free agent in 2005.

He was also a member of the New England Patriots, Minnesota Vikings and Pittsburgh Steelers.

== Early life ==
Katula attended Catholic Memorial High School in Waukesha, Wisconsin, and was a letterman in football. As a senior, he won first-team All-Conference honors on offense, and second-team All-Conference honors on defense as a linebacker. His younger brother, Sam, was a standout basketball player at UW Parkside.

== College career ==
Katula attended the University of Wisconsin–Madison, where he redshirted as a freshman in 2000. He went on to long snap for the Badgers in his final four seasons, playing in 48 of 51 possible games.

== Professional career ==
=== Baltimore Ravens ===
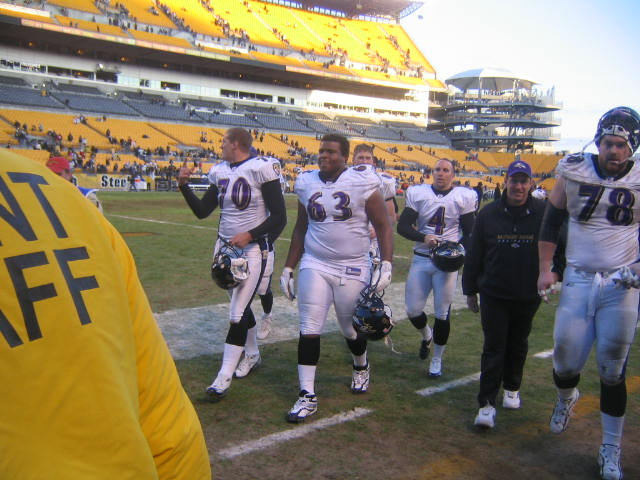
Katula (70) in 2006.

Katula joined the Baltimore Ravens as an undrafted free agent on April 29, 2005. In 2005 and 2006, he played in every regular season game. In 2005, he recorded 10 special teams tackles, the most by a long snapper. After playing in every game again in 2007, Katula was signed by the Ravens to a five-year contract extension on September 6, 2008. He played in every game again in 2008 and 2009. In 2010, he lost his long snapping job to rookie Morgan Cox and was released on August 13, 2010.

=== New England Patriots ===
The New England Patriots signed Katula on November 10, 2010, after waiving former long snapper Jake Ingram. He played in the final eight games of the season for the Patriots. He was waived on August 29, 2011.

=== Minnesota Vikings ===
On November 29, 2011, Katula signed with the Minnesota Vikings to replace the injured Cullen Loeffler. He performed the Vikings' long-snapping duties in the team's final five games.

=== Pittsburgh Steelers ===
Katula signed with Pittsburgh on June 13, 2012.
