= Isaac Smolko =

American football player (born 1983)

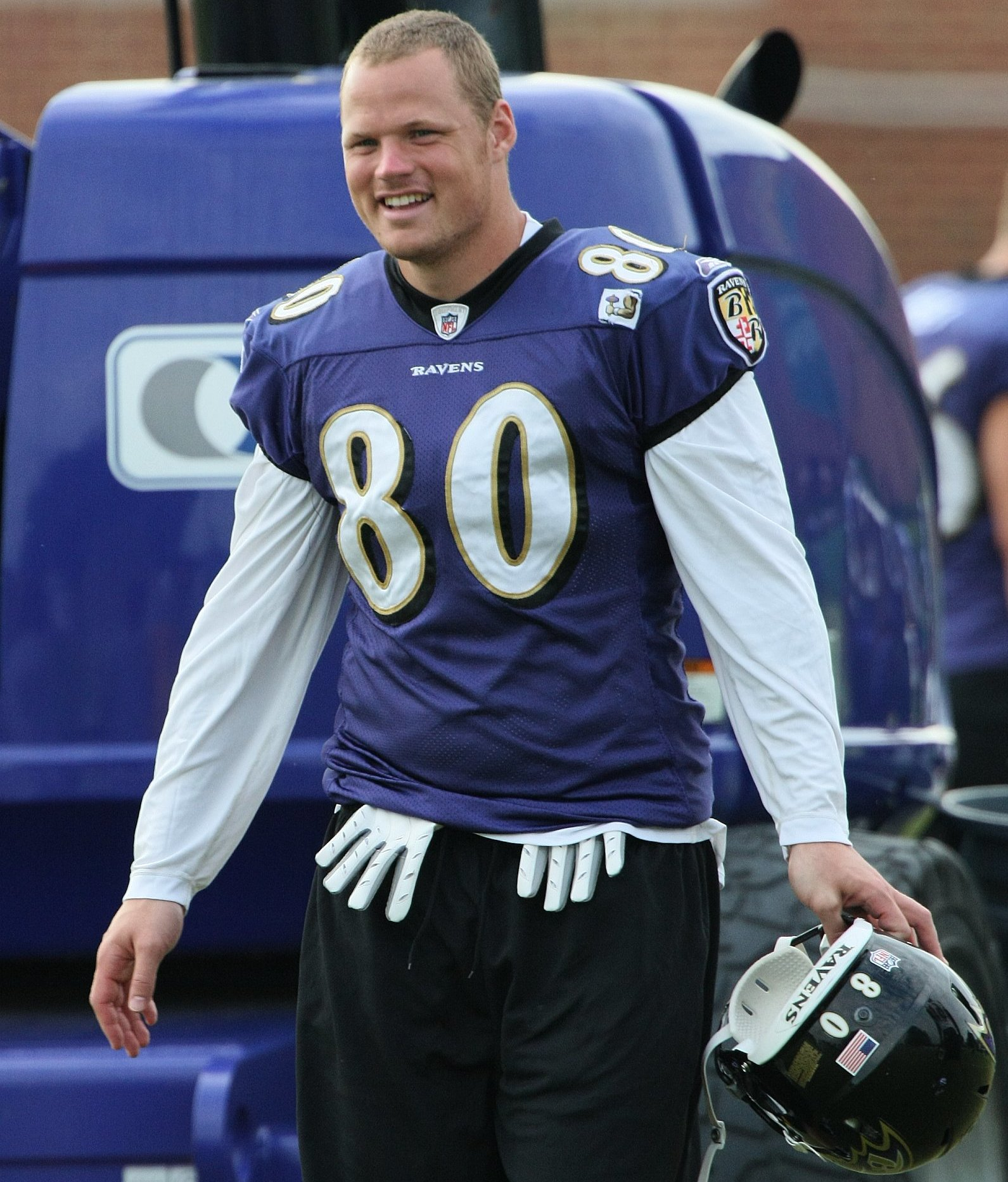
- Smolko with the Baltimore Ravens in 2009

No. 80
- Position: Tight end

Personal information
- Born: February 28, 1983 (age 43); Youngstown, Ohio, U.S.
- Listed height: 6 ft 5 in (1.96 m)
- Listed weight: 260 lb (118 kg)

Career information
- College: Penn State
- NFL draft: 2006: undrafted

Career history
- Pittsburgh Steelers (2006)*; Jacksonville Jaguars (2007); Indianapolis Colts (2008)*; Baltimore Ravens (2008–2009)*; Indianapolis Colts (2009)*
- * Offseason or practice squad member only

Career NFL statistics
- Receptions: 1
- Receiving yards: 5
- Stats at Pro Football Reference

Isaac Joseph Smolko (born February 28, 1983) is an American former professional football player who was a tight end in the National Football League (NFL). He played college football for the Penn State Nittany Lions and was signed by the Pittsburgh Steelers as an undrafted free agent in 2006.

Smolko was also a member of the Jacksonville Jaguars, Baltimore Ravens and Indianapolis Colts.

== College career ==
Smolko was a four-year letterman at Penn State University where he earned a Bachelor of Science in Kinesiology in 2006. He played high school football at Springfield High School in New Middletown, Ohio.

== Professional career ==
=== Pittsburgh Steelers ===
He signed as an undrafted rookie free agent with the National Football League's Pittsburgh Steelers following the 2006 NFL draft. Despite a productive training camp—including an athletic touchdown catch in Game 1 of the preseason versus the Arizona Cardinals—Smolko was released at the end of the preseason.

=== Jacksonville Jaguars ===
He signed with the Jacksonville Jaguars prior to the 2007 season. Despite another promising preseason, including a game against the Washington Redskins where he was used in six positions—tight end, fullback, linebacker, defensive end and two positions on special teams—Smolko was released on September 1, 2007. He spent the first 8 weeks of the 2007 season on the practice squad before being activated for the Jaguars' week 9 game against New Orleans. He was waived and re-signed to the practice squad until his activation prior to the Jaguars' Week 13 game at Indianapolis. All told, he would see action in six games that season.

On June 16, 2008, Smolko was waived by the Jaguars before training camp, only to be re-signed on August 4, after rookie fullback Anthony Cotrone was placed on the injured reserve list. He was again released on August 26.

=== First stint with Colts ===
Smolko was signed to the practice squad of the Indianapolis Colts on September 11, 2008. He was released on October 2.

=== Baltimore Ravens ===
Smolko was signed to the practice squad of the Baltimore Ravens on October 29, 2008. He was released on December 4, only to be re-signed on December 10. He was re-signed to a one-year future contract at the conclusion of the 2008 season.

He was released on September 5 and re-signed to the practice squad. After the Ravens signed tight end Davon Drew to the practice squad he was released on September 15.

=== Second stint with Colts ===
Smolko was re-signed to the Indianapolis Colts' practice squad on January 6, 2010. He was released on January 27.

== Personal life ==
Smolko was given the name "Ivan" by his position coach, Mike Tice, during the Jaguars 2007 training camp. The nickname received widespread exposure when head coach Jack Del Rio erroneously referred to Smolko as Ivan during his postgame press conference following the preseason finale. Jaguars.com senior editor Vic Ketchman later took to calling him "Ivan 'Don't Call Me Isaac' Smolko" on the team's website.

Smolko and his wife Katie reside in Ponte Vedra, FL. His father Joseph "Buckey" Smolko and mother Marie, as well as sisters Lori and Carrie still reside in his hometown.
