= Chris Carr (American football) =

American football player (born 1983)

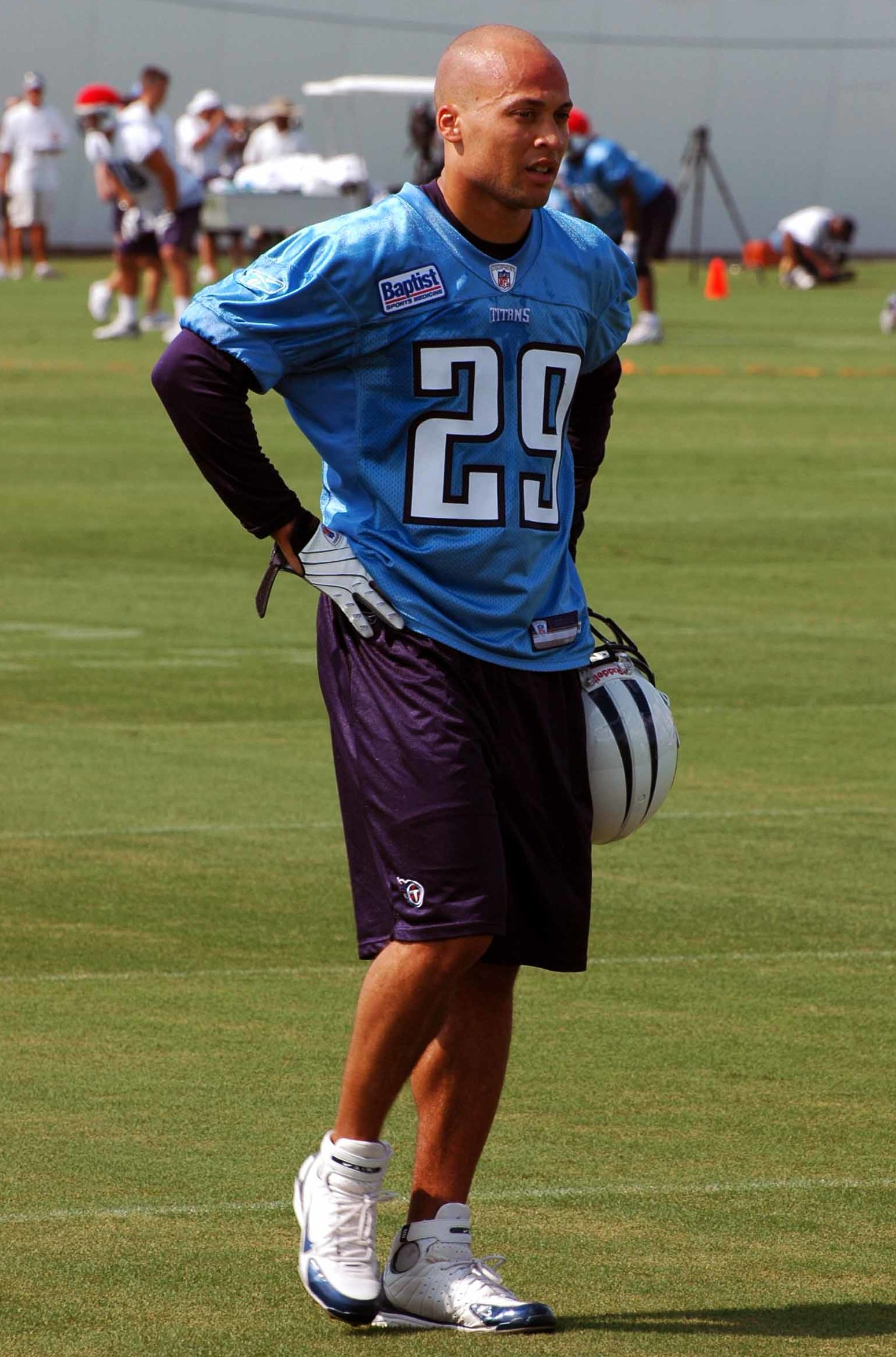
- Carr with the Tennessee Titans in 2008

No. 23, 29, 25, 22, 31
- Positions: Cornerback, kick returner

Personal information
- Born: April 30, 1983 (age 43); Reno, Nevada, U.S.
- Listed height: 5 ft 10 in (1.78 m)
- Listed weight: 182 lb (83 kg)

Career information
- High school: Robert McQueen (Reno)
- College: Boise State
- NFL draft: 2005: undrafted

Career history
- Oakland Raiders (2005−2007); Tennessee Titans (2008); Baltimore Ravens (2009−2011); Minnesota Vikings (2012)*; San Diego Chargers (2012); New Orleans Saints (2013)
- * Offseason or practice squad member only

Career NFL statistics
- Total tackles: 233
- Sacks: 2.5
- Forced fumbles: 7
- Interceptions: 7
- Total return yards: 7,349
- Total touchdowns: 1
- Stats at Pro Football Reference

Charles Christopher Carr (born April 30, 1983) is an American former professional football player who was a cornerback, punt returner, and kick returner in the National Football League (NFL). He was signed by the Oakland Raiders as an undrafted free agent in 2005. He was also a member of the Tennessee Titans, Baltimore Ravens, Minnesota Vikings, San Diego Chargers and New Orleans Saints. He played college football for the Boise State Broncos.

Chris is currently a Partner and attorney at Murray Osorio, PLLC in Fairfax, Virginia.

== Early life ==
Born in Reno, Nevada, he played both football and basketball at Robert McQueen High School in Reno. He also played for the Reno Steelers Pop Warner team. He played defensive back and was an All-State running back as a sophomore, junior and senior. He was also named Northern Nevada Player of the Year and Offensive Player of the Year his senior year, where he rushed for 1,944 yards on 206 carries and 34 touchdowns.

== College career ==
He played his college ball at Boise State University in Boise, Idaho, lettered all four years, played in all 12 games as a true freshman in 2001 and posted 32 tackles. Carr was the Pat Fuller Memorial Award winner for Academic Achievement. As a senior, in 2004, he finished the season as the NCAA active career leader in average yardage per punt return, with 19.8 (22 punt returns for 432 yards). Even though he missed the last six games of regular season, as a senior, he was named honorable mention All-WAC as a safety and kick returner.

== Professional career ==
Pre-draft measurables
Height	Weight	40-yard dash	20-yard shuttle	Three-cone drill	Vertical jump	Broad jump	Bench press
5 ft 9 1/8 in (1.76 m)	182 lb (83 kg)	4.61 s	3.95 s	6.74 s	38.5 in (0.98 m)	9 ft 7 in (2.92 m)	15 reps
All values from Pro Day

=== Oakland Raiders ===
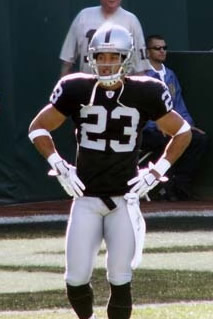
Carr with the Raiders in 2007.

He was signed by the Oakland Raiders in 2005 as an undrafted free agent. Carr's main contribution to the Raiders was as a kickoff and punt returner on special teams. He played in all 16 games in the 2005 NFL season for the Raiders, and had seven tackles, two assists and two pass deflections. As a kick returner, he ran 73 times for 1752 yards (an average of 24 per carry) with a long of 62 yards. As a punt returner, he ran 32 times for 186 yards (an average of 5.5) with a long of 34. He only gave up 2 fumbles.

His first touchdown came while playing as a cornerback, when he intercepted a pass by Pittsburgh Steelers quarterback Ben Roethlisberger and returned it 100 yards for a touchdown on October 29, 2006, at McAfee Coliseum. It was the second longest interception for a touchdown in Raiders history (6th longest in NFL history) and helped seal an upset win over the defending Super Bowl champions.

Carr is the Raiders all-time leader in kickoff return yardage, with a total of 4,841 yards on 201 attempts.

=== Tennessee Titans ===
Carr became a restricted free agent in the 2008 offseason. On March 29, the Titans signed Carr to a one-year, $2 million offer sheet. On April 5, the Raiders declined to match the offer after seven days and Carr became a member of the Titans. Carr had 31 tackles and an interception with the Titans in 2008. He also had his best year as a return man as a member of the Tennessee Titans Averaging 28.1 yards per kick return and 10.1 yards per punt return. The Titans finished the season with the best return average in the NFL.

=== Baltimore Ravens ===
Carr signed a two-year, $5 million contract with the Baltimore Ravens on March 18, 2009. In the 2009 season, Carr started off as primarily a returner, but injuries to Fabian Washington and Lardarius Webb made him a more prominent part of the defense. He finished the year strongly in his new role, recording career highs with 44 tackles and 2 interceptions. The year was capped off with an interception of Tom Brady in the playoffs when facing the New England Patriots.

At the start of training camp the following year, Dominique Foxworth suffered a tear to his ACL. With Washington and Webb still recovering from ACL tears of their own, Carr was upgraded to a starter in drills and the preseason alongside former Seattle Seahawk Josh Wilson. He began the season as a starter opposite the returning Washington. Carr was used much less as a returner and much more on defense, having his best defensive year of his career. In 2010, Carr set a career-high in tackles (61) and tied a previous career high set in 2009 with two interceptions.

On July 30, 2011, the Baltimore Ravens re-signed Carr (four-year deal) as an unrestricted free agent, retaining experience in an otherwise very young cornerback group that included 2011 first-round pick Jimmy Smith. Carr, however, missed much of 2011 with injuries, and became expendable. He recorded only 19 tackles that year (plus a sack). Carr had previously never missed a game in his career.

=== Minnesota Vikings ===
Carr signed with the Minnesota Vikings on April 4, 2012. On August 31, 2012, as the Vikings reduced their roster to league maximum of 53 players, he was released.

=== San Diego Chargers ===
After spending the first four weeks of the 2012 season out of football, Carr joined his fifth career team by signing a one-year contract with the San Diego Chargers. The Chargers had sustained multiple injuries to their secondary.

While with the team, he recorded four tackles, returned five kickoffs, and two punts. He played in nine games.

=== New Orleans Saints ===
On June 11, 2013, Carr signed a one-year deal with the New Orleans Saints. He was cut on August 31, 2013. After cornerback Patrick Robinson was injured in the Saints' second game, Carr was re-signed on September 17, 2013. On December 17, 2013, Carr was released.

== NFL career statistics ==
Legend
**Bold**	Career high

=== Regular season ===
Year	Team	Games		Tackles					Interceptions					Fumbles			
Year	Team	GP	GS	Cmb	Solo	Ast	Sck	TFL	Int	Yds	TD	Lng	PD	FF	FR	Yds	TD
2005	OAK	**16**	0	11	8	3	0.0	0	0	0	0	0	2	0	**3**	-1	0
2006	OAK	**16**	2	18	12	6	0.0	0	1	**100**	**1**	**100**	2	2	1	0	0
2007	OAK	**16**	2	28	24	4	0.0	2	0	0	0	0	1	0	0	0	0
2008	TEN	**16**	2	32	29	3	0.0	2	1	0	0	0	5	0	1	0	0
2009	BAL	**16**	4	44	38	6	**1.5**	**3**	**2**	24	0	13	4	2	0	0	0
2010	BAL	**16**	**16**	**61**	**54**	**7**	0.0	2	**2**	13	0	12	**8**	**3**	0	0	0
2011	BAL	9	1	19	16	3	1.0	2	0	0	0	0	3	0	0	0	0
2012	SD	9	0	4	3	1	0.0	0	0	0	0	0	0	0	0	0	0
2013	NO	11	0	16	11	5	0.0	0	1	0	0	0	4	0	0	0	0
		125	27	233	195	38	2.5	11	7	137	1	100	29	7	5	-1	0

=== Playoffs ===
Year	Team	Games		Tackles					Interceptions					Fumbles			
Year	Team	GP	GS	Cmb	Solo	Ast	Sck	TFL	Int	Yds	TD	Lng	PD	FF	FR	Yds	TD
2009	BAL	**2**	**2**	**11**	**10**	**1**	0.0	**3**	**1**	**3**	0	**3**	**2**	0	0	0	0
2010	BAL	**2**	**2**	8	7	**1**	0.0	1	0	0	0	0	0	0	**1**	0	0
		4	4	19	17	2	0.0	4	1	3	0	3	2	0	1	0	0

=== Retirement ===
On March 19, 2014, Carr announced his intention to retire.

In May 2017, Carr graduated from the George Washington University Law School. He is currently a Partner and attorney at Murray Osorio PLLC, a full-service immigration law firm with offices throughout the United States.
