= Justin Bannan =

American football player (born 1979)

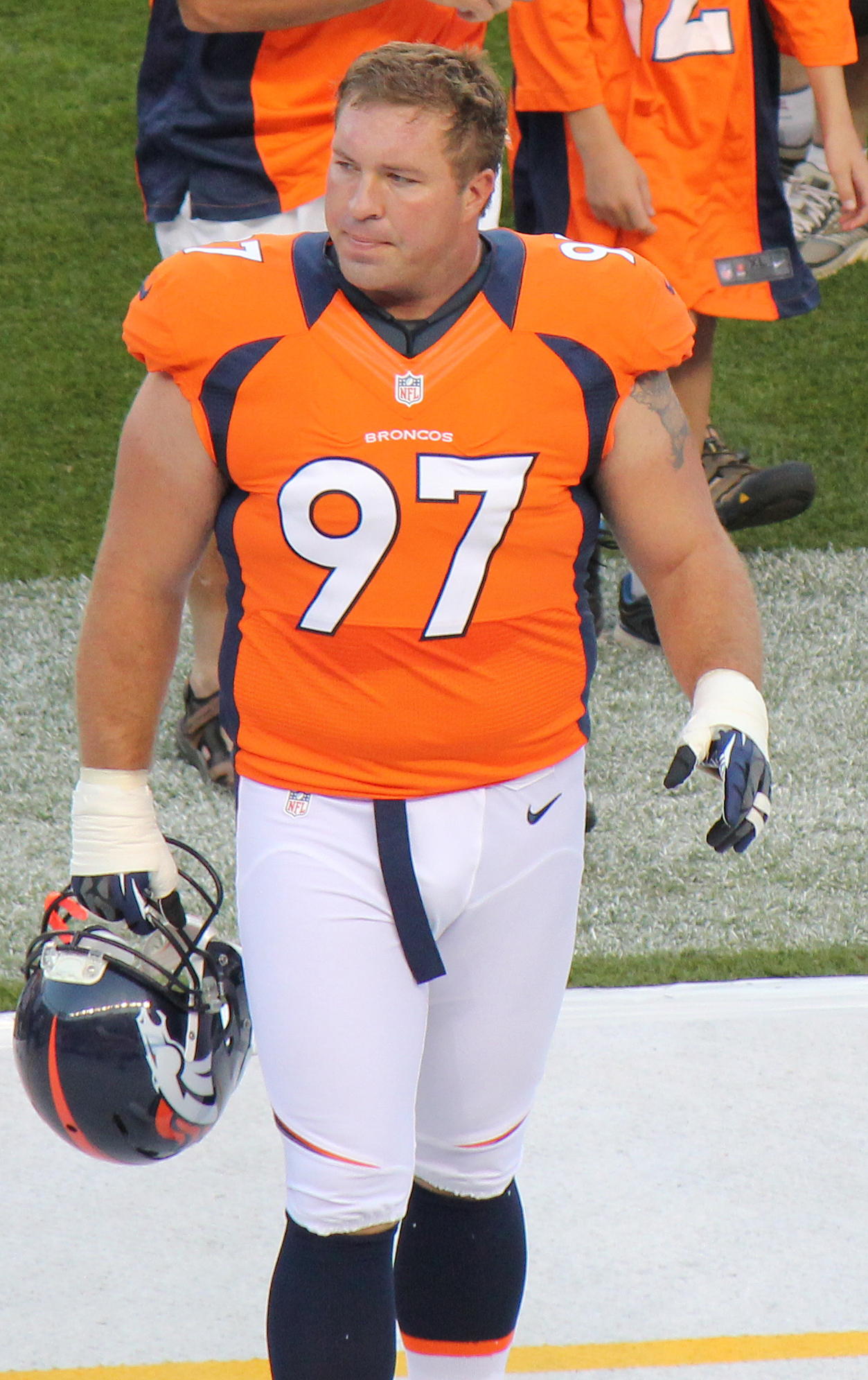
- Bannan with the Denver Broncos in 2012

No. 97, 94, 95
- Position: Defensive tackle

Personal information
- Born: April 18, 1979 (age 47); Sacramento, California, U.S.
- Listed height: 6 ft 3 in (1.91 m)
- Listed weight: 312 lb (142 kg)

Career information
- High school: Bella Vista (Fair Oaks, California)
- College: Colorado
- NFL draft: 2002: 5th round, 139th overall pick

Career history
- Buffalo Bills (2002−2005); Baltimore Ravens (2006−2009); Denver Broncos (2010); St. Louis Rams (2011); Denver Broncos (2012); Detroit Lions (2013)

Awards and highlights
- First-team All-Big 12 (2001); Second-team All-Big 12 (1999)

Career NFL statistics
- Total tackles: 313
- Sacks: 6.5
- Forced fumbles: 5
- Fumble recoveries: 2
- Pass deflections: 14
- Interceptions: 1
- Stats at Pro Football Reference

Justin Lewis Bannan (born April 18, 1979) is an American former professional football player who was a defensive tackle in the National Football League (NFL). He played college football for the Colorado Buffaloes before being selected by the Buffalo Bills in the fifth round of the 2002 NFL draft. Bannan also played for the Baltimore Ravens, Denver Broncos, St. Louis Rams, and Detroit Lions.

In 2019, Bannan wounded an acupuncturist when he shot her in the shoulder as she entered her treatment room, where he had been hiding. Bannan was sentenced to sixteen years imprisonment for attempted murder and felony assault in 2022.

== Early life ==
Bannan graduated from Bella Vista High School in Fair Oaks, California, in 1997 and was a letterman in football and basketball. Bannan received a scholarship to play football at the University of Colorado Boulder, where he was a starter for the Buffaloes from 1997 to 2001.

== Professional career ==
Pre-draft measurables
Height	Weight	Arm length	Hand span	40-yard dash	10-yard split	20-yard split	20-yard shuttle	Three-cone drill	Vertical jump	Broad jump	Bench press
6 ft 2 3/4 in (1.90 m)	300 lb (136 kg)	31 1/8 in (0.79 m)	9 3/4 in (0.25 m)	5.01 s	1.74 s	2.92 s	4.24 s	7.31 s	29.0 in (0.74 m)	8 ft 3 in (2.51 m)	24 reps
All values from NFL Combine

=== Buffalo Bills ===
Bannan was selected by the Buffalo Bills in the fifth round (139th overall) of the 2002 NFL draft and played for them through the 2005 season.

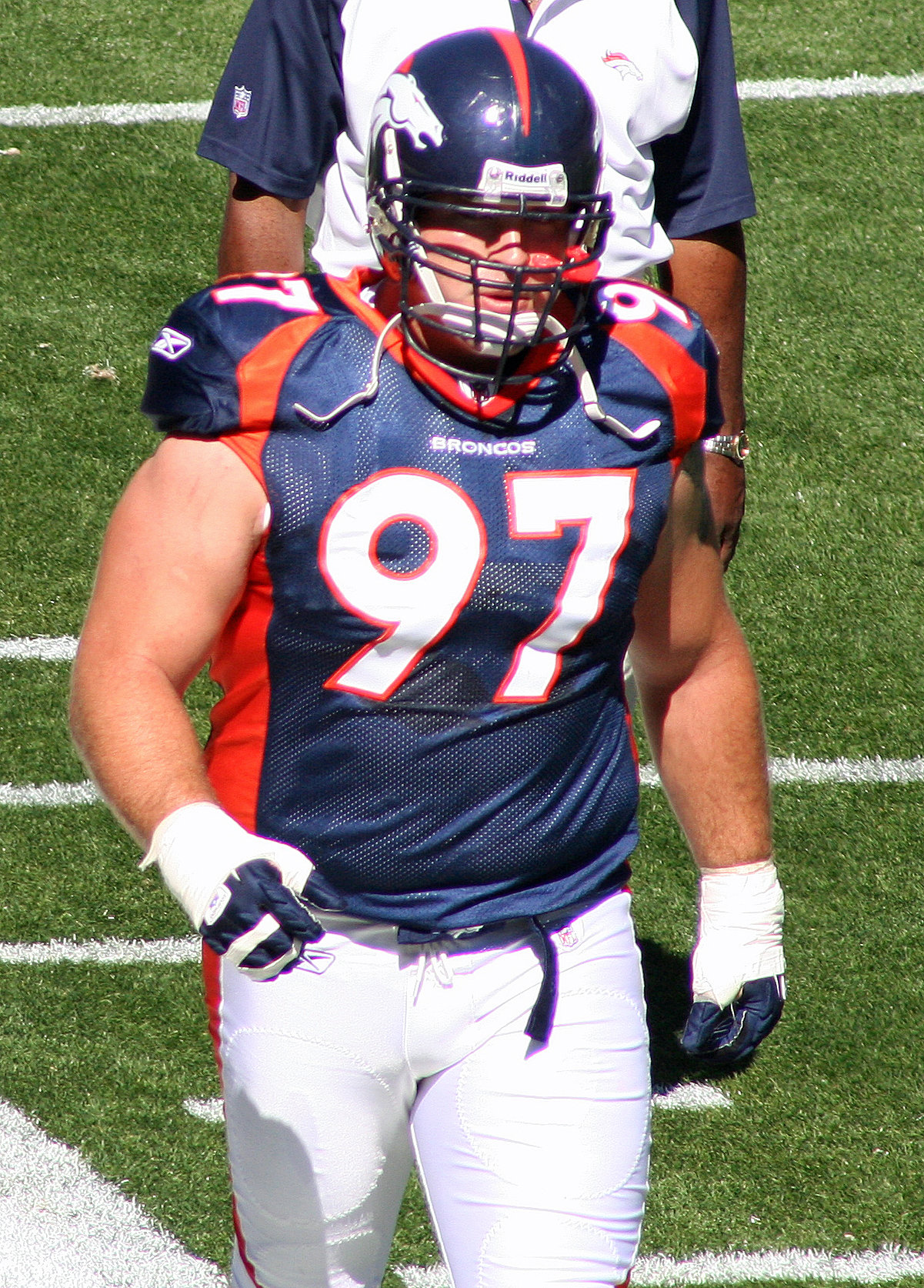
Bannan with the Broncos in 2010

=== Baltimore Ravens ===
Bannan joined the Baltimore Ravens before the 2006 season and played for them until 2009. In the 2008 season, he set a personal-best with 30 solo tackles (56 total), one sack and one interception.

=== Denver Broncos (first stint) ===
On March 5, 2010, Bannan signed a five-year contract with the Denver Broncos. On March 3, 2011, the Broncos released Bannan.

=== St. Louis Rams ===
Bannan signed with the St. Louis Rams on July 30, 2011. He was released following the 2011 season on March 12, 2012.

=== Denver Broncos (second stint) ===
On April 11, 2012, Bannan signed a one-year deal with the Broncos.

=== Detroit Lions ===
On August 15, 2013, Bannan signed a contract with the Detroit Lions. Bannan was released from the Lions on September 25, 2013.

== NFL career statistics ==
Legend
**Bold**	Career high

=== Regular season ===
Year	Team	Games		Tackles					Interceptions					Fumbles			
Year	Team	GP	GS	Cmb	Solo	Ast	Sck	TFL	Int	Yds	TD	Lng	PD	FF	FR	Yds	TD
2002	BUF	15	0	21	15	6	1.0	2	0	0	0	0	0	**1**	**1**	0	0
2003	BUF	14	1	15	9	6	0.0	1	0	0	0	0	0	0	0	0	0
2004	BUF	10	0	2	1	1	0.0	0	0	0	0	0	0	0	0	0	0
2005	BUF	**16**	7	40	23	**17**	1.5	4	0	0	0	0	0	0	0	0	0
2006	BAL	11	1	15	13	2	0.0	0	0	0	0	0	0	**1**	0	0	0
2007	BAL	15	1	30	21	9	**2.0**	**5**	0	0	0	0	0	**1**	0	0	0
2008	BAL	**16**	15	**45**	**30**	15	1.0	4	**1**	-4	0	-4	3	0	0	0	0
2009	BAL	**16**	2	35	29	6	0.0	2	0	0	0	0	0	0	0	0	0
2010	DEN	**16**	**16**	35	25	10	1.0	3	0	0	0	0	**4**	**1**	0	0	0
2011	STL	15	14	32	26	6	0.0	4	0	0	0	0	3	0	0	0	0
2012	DEN	**16**	15	42	28	14	0.0	2	0	0	0	0	**4**	**1**	**1**	0	0
2013	DET	3	0	1	0	1	0.0	0	0	0	0	0	0	0	0	0	0
Career		163	72	313	220	93	6.5	27	1	-4	0	0	14	5	2	0	0

=== Playoffs ===
Year	Team	Games		Tackles					Interceptions					Fumbles			
Year	Team	GP	GS	Cmb	Solo	Ast	Sck	TFL	Int	Yds	TD	Lng	PD	FF	FR	Yds	TD
2008	BAL	**3**	**3**	**11**	**9**	**2**	0.0	**1**	0	0	0	0	0	0	0	0	0
2009	BAL	2	0	2	2	0	0.0	0	0	0	0	0	0	0	0	0	0
2012	DEN	1	1	7	5	**2**	0.0	0	0	0	0	0	**1**	0	0	0	0
Career		6	4	20	16	4	0.0	1	0	0	0	0	1	0	0	0	0

== Post-football career ==
Bannan partnered with his former Broncos teammate Chris Kuper to co-found Black Lab Sports, a sports technology incubator and venture capital firm. The company opened an office in Boulder, Colorado in 2015. The company made its first investment into iSplack, a company that manufactures custom eye black.

== Criminal conviction ==
On October 16, 2019, Bannan shot and wounded an acupuncturist as she was entering her locked treatment room. Bannan had been crouching in the corner of the office, which was located in a building shared by Bannan's Black Lab Sports company. When he was arrested, he told police that he was hiding from the Russian mafia and had disposed of his cell phone because he believed someone was tracking him. He also told police he was suffering from hydrocephalus. He had a backpack with him that contained two .45-caliber handguns, as well as a rolled bill containing cocaine residue.

Bannan pleaded not guilty by reason of insanity, and his lawyer argued that multiple head injuries sustained over his football career could have contributed to chronic traumatic encephalopathy (CTE), a neurodegenerative disease that has been linked to repetitive head trauma. Prosecutors argued that his paranoia was linked to his drug abuse. Bannan was found guilty on one count of first-degree attempted murder, one count of second-degree attempted murder, and two counts of felony assault. He was sentenced to sixteen years in prison, which was the mandatory minimum sentence for his conviction. The victim had requested he receive the minimum sentence, but maximum probation and mandatory drug treatment. The victim filed a civil lawsuit against Bannan and Black Lab sports in 2020.

== Personal life ==
Bannan grew up in Sacramento, California, where his father ran a construction company. He has a brother who is six years older than him. Bannan became interested in finance when he joined the NFL, and described investing as a hobby.

Bannon married his wife Sommer in 2011. The couple has one child together. They divorced in 2014. In 2015, Bannan had a child from a different relationship.
