= K. J. Gerard =

American football player (born 1986)

No. 40
- Position: Cornerback

Personal information
- Born: April 22, 1986 (age 40); Orange County, California U.S.
- Listed height: 6 ft 1 in (1.85 m)
- Listed weight: 187 lb (85 kg)

Career information
- High school: Fountain Valley (Fountain Valley, California)
- College: Northern Arizona
- NFL draft: 2009: undrafted

Career history
- Baltimore Ravens (2009–2010); Chicago Bears (2010–2011)*; Miami Dolphins (2011)*
- * Offseason or practice squad member only
- Stats at Pro Football Reference

K. J. Gerard (born April 22, 1986) is an American former professional football safety. He was signed by the Baltimore Ravens as an undrafted free agent in 2009. He played college football at Northern Arizona.

He was also a member of the Chicago Bears and Miami Dolphins.
