= Haruki Nakamura =

American football player (born 1986)

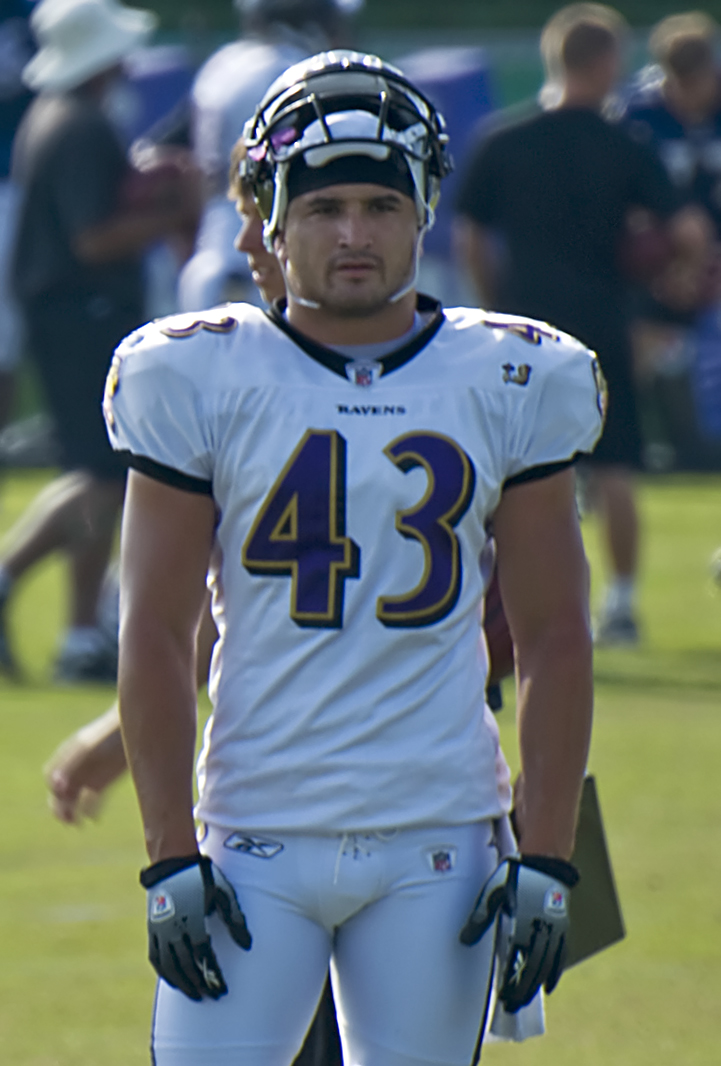
- Nakamura with the Baltimore Ravens in 2009

No. 43
- Position: Safety

Personal information
- Born: April 18, 1986 (age 40); Elyria, Ohio, U.S.
- Listed height: 5 ft 10 in (1.78 m)
- Listed weight: 190 lb (86 kg)

Career information
- High school: St. Edward (Lakewood, Ohio)
- College: Cincinnati
- NFL draft: 2008: 6th round, 206th overall pick

Career history
- Baltimore Ravens (2008–2011); Carolina Panthers (2012)

Awards and highlights
- First-team All-Big East (2007)

Career NFL statistics
- Total tackles: 106
- Forced fumbles: 1
- Pass deflections: 7
- Interceptions: 2
- Stats at Pro Football Reference

Haruki Robert Nakamura (born April 18, 1986) is an American former professional football player who was a safety in the National Football League (NFL). He was selected by the Baltimore Ravens in the sixth round of the 2008 NFL draft. He played college football for the Cincinnati Bearcats.

== Early life ==
Nakamura's parents, Karen and Ryozo, were each competitive in international judo competitions. His Irish American mother is a fourth-degree black belt and his late Japanese father Ryozo was an eighth-degree black belt. His brothers Mako and Yoshi were each international judo champions. Yoshi was a two-time Ohio state wrestling champion and also competed in the U.S. Olympic Trials. Nakamura's sister, Kimi, was a national champion in judo and played college volleyball at the University of Cincinnati. Brother Mako is also an international hat model. Brother Yoshi has also been cast in two feature films, Foxcatcher and The Wolf of Wall Street.

Nakamura attended St. Edward High School, an all-boys Catholic high school on Cleveland's west side. He played football as both a wide receiver and defensive back. In 2003, he was instrumental in the team's runner-up finish in the Ohio Division I "big school" playoffs. He earned second-team "All-Ohio" honors as a defensive back his senior season. He graduated in 2004.

He attended the University of Cincinnati, where he majored in criminal justice. He played college football for the Bearcats, playing free safety and on special teams, eventually earning first-team "All-Big East" honors.

== Professional football ==
=== Baltimore Ravens ===
On April 26, 2008, he was selected by the Ravens in the sixth round of the 2008 NFL draft, the 206th player overall. For the 2008 season, Nakamura had 12 tackles in 16 games.

On January 10, 2009, Nakamura recorded a career-high five tackles in the Baltimore Ravens 13-10 upset of the AFC's top-seeded Tennessee Titans.

On November 16, 2009, Nakamura was injured on the opening kickoff of a Monday Night Football game versus the Cleveland Browns in his hometown of Cleveland. He suffered a broken right ankle attempting to make a tackle on special teams. Two days later, he was placed on the injured reserve list, ending his season. For the season, he played in nine games with seven special teams tackles and one tackle on defense.

In the 2010 preseason, Nakamura showed signs of a breakout season as evidenced in the pre-season week-three game against the New York Giants. Nakamura made an interception that coach John Harbaugh described as being "as good a play as you're ever going to see . . . I don't know how he came up with the ball. He's just a tremendous athlete. He's a football player, through and through." Nakamura also sacked the Giants' quarterback for a loss in that same game. He also returned a fake kickoff against the Washington Redskins.

During the 2010 regular season, Nakamura played in all 16 games and recorded 16 tackles, plus he was second in special teams tackles with 13. He played in all three of the Ravens' post-season games, and in the AFC wild card game he intercepted a pass from Kansas City Chiefs quarterback Matt Cassel.

In 2011, he played in 15 games (he was inactive for one) and tied for second on the team with nine special teams tackles while posting three tackles backing up safety Ed Reed on defense. In a Week 4 game against the St. Louis Rams in 2011, Nakamura was injured and missed a month. He played in two post-season games, leading the team with four special teams tackles.

=== Carolina Panthers ===
Nakamura signed with the Carolina Panthers on March 16, 2012. He started a career-high 13 games at free safety, recorded a career-high in tackles with 52, tied for the team lead in interceptions with two and had 10 special teams tackles. His season ended when he suffered a groin injury versus the Atlanta Falcons on December 9 and was placed on injured reserve two days later.

In 2013, during the preseason, he suffered a concussion. On September 2 the Panthers placed him on injured reserve and two days later his status was revised to "released/injury settlement".
