= Brandon McKinney =

American football player (born 1983)

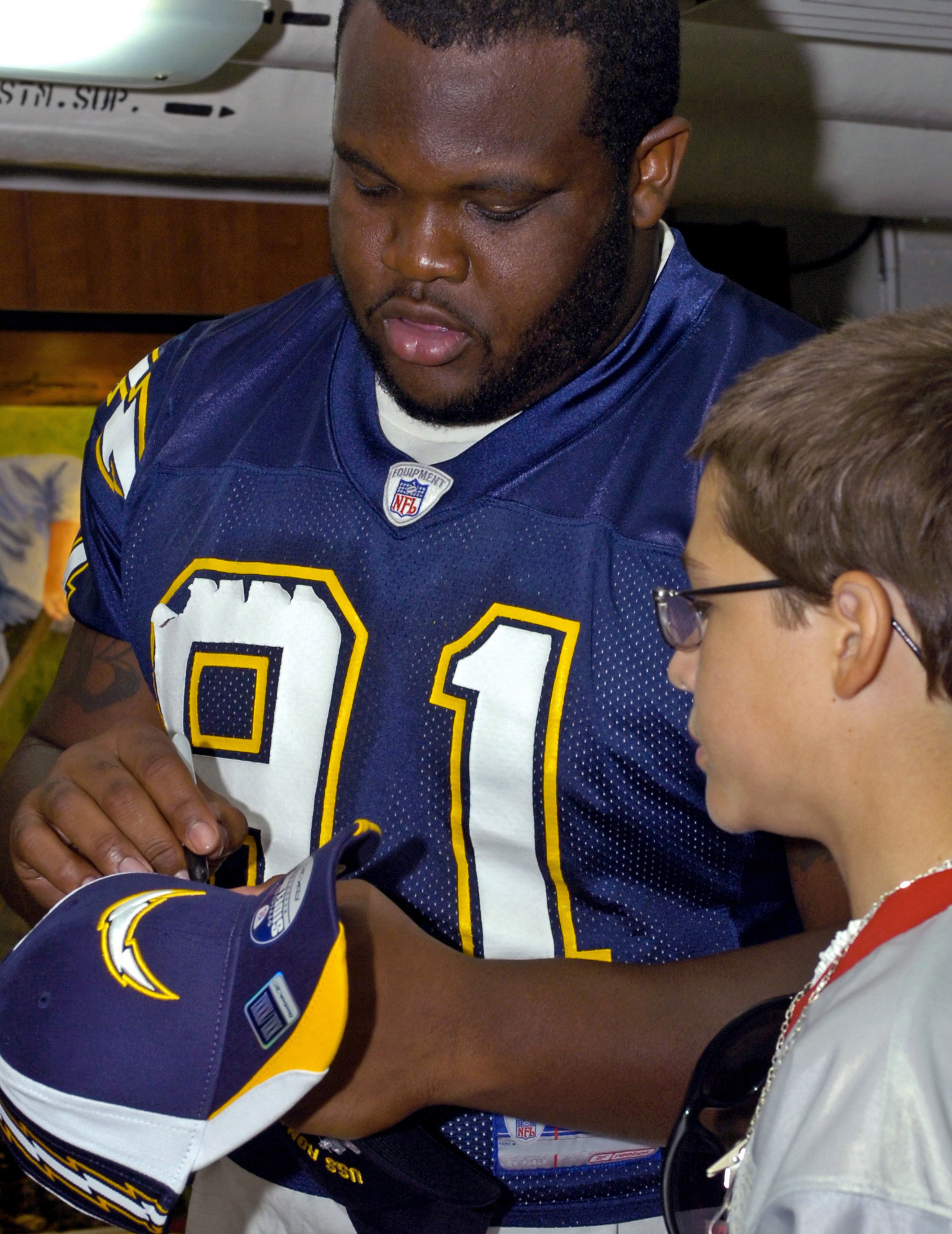
- McKinney (left) on the USS Ronald Reagan in 2006

No. 91, 68
- Position: Nose tackle

Personal information
- Born: August 24, 1983 (age 43); Dayton, Ohio, U.S.
- Listed height: 6 ft 2 in (1.88 m)
- Listed weight: 345 lb (156 kg)

Career information
- High school: Chaminade-Julienne (Dayton)
- College: Michigan State
- NFL draft: 2006: undrafted

Career history
- San Diego Chargers (2006–2008); Baltimore Ravens (2008–2011); Indianapolis Colts (2012–2014)

Career NFL statistics
- Total tackles: 60
- Forced fumbles: 1
- Fumble recoveries: 1
- Stats at Pro Football Reference

Brandon McKinney (born August 24, 1983) is an American former professional football player who was a nose tackle in the National Football League (NFL). He was signed by the San Diego Chargers as an undrafted free agent in 2006. He played college football for the Michigan State Spartans. He graduated from Chaminade-Julienne High School.

McKinney has also played for the Baltimore Ravens and Indianapolis Colts.

== Professional career ==
=== San Diego Chargers ===
Brandon McKinney made his NFL debut for the San Diego Chargers in 2006. He was a quality backup nose tackle for two seasons there. McKinney was released by the Chargers on October 4, 2008 following the return of suspended linebacker Stephen Cooper.

=== Baltimore Ravens ===
McKinney was signed by the Baltimore Ravens on October 8, 2008 after nose tackle Kelly Gregg was placed on season-ending injured reserve. McKinney, then #68, recovered a fumble from Pittsburgh Steelers QB Ben Roethlisberger.

McKinney was re-signed by the Ravens on February 17, 2009, preventing him from becoming a restricted free agent in the offseason.

In December 2009, the Ravens placed McKinney (now back to #91, which he wore for the San Diego Chargers) on injured reserve due to a back injury after just two tackles in 2009. In 2010, he would come back from injury and record 10 tackles for the Baltimore Ravens.

=== Indianapolis Colts ===
McKinney signed with the Indianapolis Colts on April 4, 2012. On August 6, 2013, McKinney was released with an injury settlement. On June 19, 2014, McKinney was re-signed by the Colts, but the Colts cut McKinney on August 30, 2014.
