= Edgar Jones (linebacker) =

American football player (born 1984)

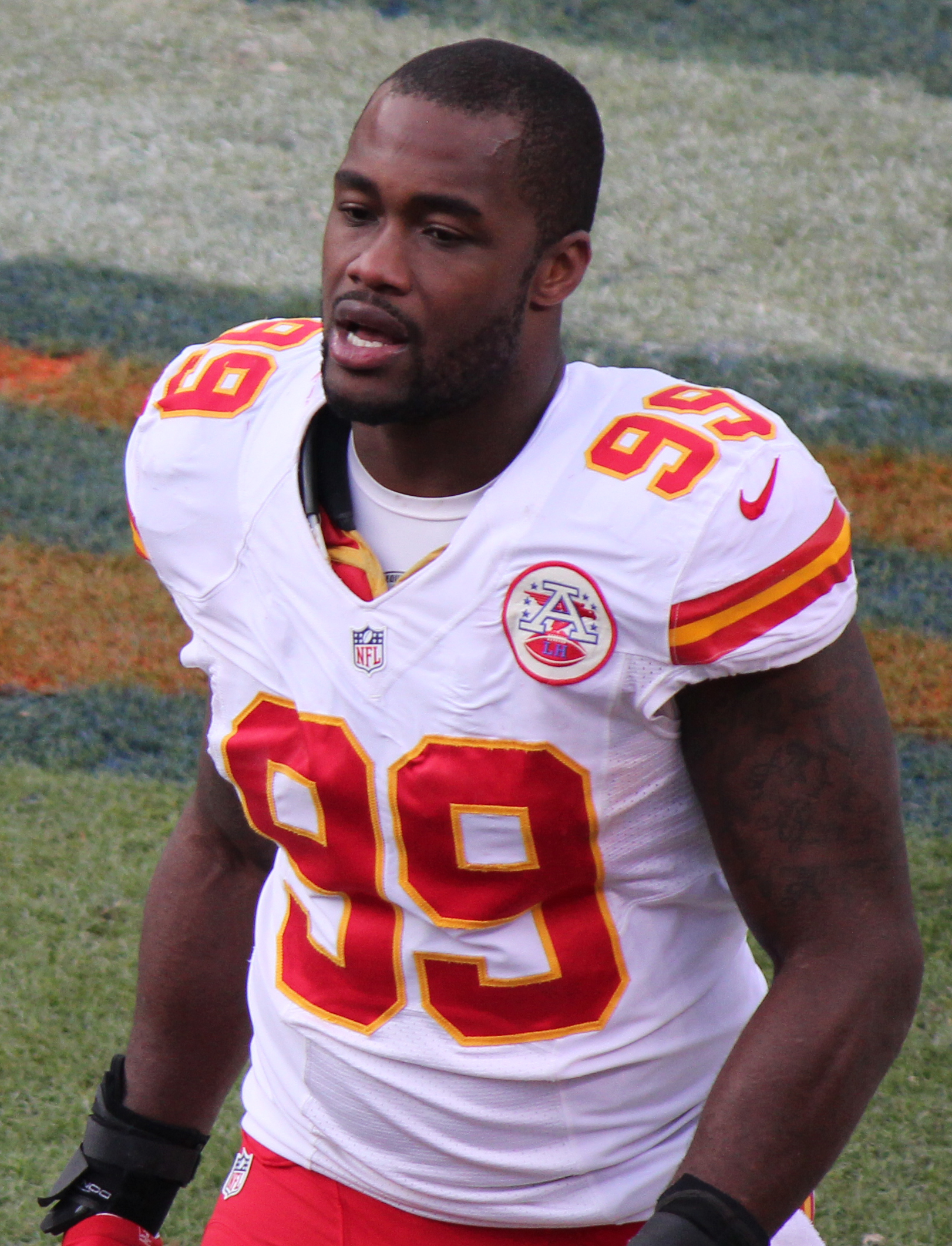
- Jones in 2012

No. 91, 84, 50, 56, 99, 55
- Position: Linebacker

Personal information
- Born: December 1, 1984 (age 41); Rayville, Louisiana, U.S.
- Listed height: 6 ft 3 in (1.91 m)
- Listed weight: 263 lb (119 kg)

Career information
- High school: Rayville
- College: Southeast Missouri State
- NFL draft: 2007: undrafted

Career history
- Baltimore Ravens (2007−2010); Washington Redskins (2011)*; Baltimore Ravens (2011); Kansas City Chiefs (2012); Dallas Cowboys (2013); Cleveland Browns (2014)*
- * Offseason or practice squad member only

Awards and highlights
- First-team All-American (2006); First-team All-OVC (2006)

Career NFL statistics
- Total tackles: 38
- Sacks: 1.5
- Fumble recoveries: 2
- Defensive touchdowns: 1
- Stats at Pro Football Reference

Edgar Devon Jones (born December 1, 1984) is an American former professional football player who was a linebacker in the National Football League (NFL). After playing college football for the Southeast Missouri State Redhawks, he was signed by the Baltimore Ravens as an undrafted free agent in 2007. He played for the Ravens for five seasons from 2007 to 2011. He also played for the Kansas City Chiefs and the Dallas Cowboys.

== College career ==
He played college football at Southeast Missouri State, where he was named a first-team All-American following his senior season with he led all of Division I-AA with 12.0 quarterback sacks. He was named the MVP of the Magnolia Gridiron Classic - a postseason All-Star Game - after recording 4.0 sacks in that contest.

== Professional career ==
=== Baltimore Ravens ===
Jones was signed by the Baltimore Ravens as an undrafted free agent in 2007. He filled a number of different roles as a Raven, including outside linebacker, defensive end, and tight end. His biggest contributions, however, came on special teams, where he established himself as one of their top special teams tacklers and blockers.

=== Kansas City Chiefs ===
Jones signed with the Kansas City Chiefs on July 29, 2012. He became one of the team's most valuable special teams players, leading the Chiefs with seven tackles and two fumbles recoveries on special teams, including one returned for his first NFL touchdown at the Tampa Bay Buccaneers on October 14, 2012.

On August 31, 2013, Jones and a seventh round draft choice (#238-Will Smith) were traded to the Dallas Cowboys in exchange for a sixth round draft choice (#193-Zach Fulton).

=== Dallas Cowboys ===
On October 18, 2013, Jones was placed on the injured reserve-designated to return list with a hernia. He was activated from injury reserve on December 14. He wasn't re-signed at the end of the season.

=== Cleveland Browns ===
Jones signed with the Cleveland Browns on July 24, 2014. He was released on August 4. He announced his retirement on February 25, 2015.
