= Kelly Talavou =

American football player (born 1984)

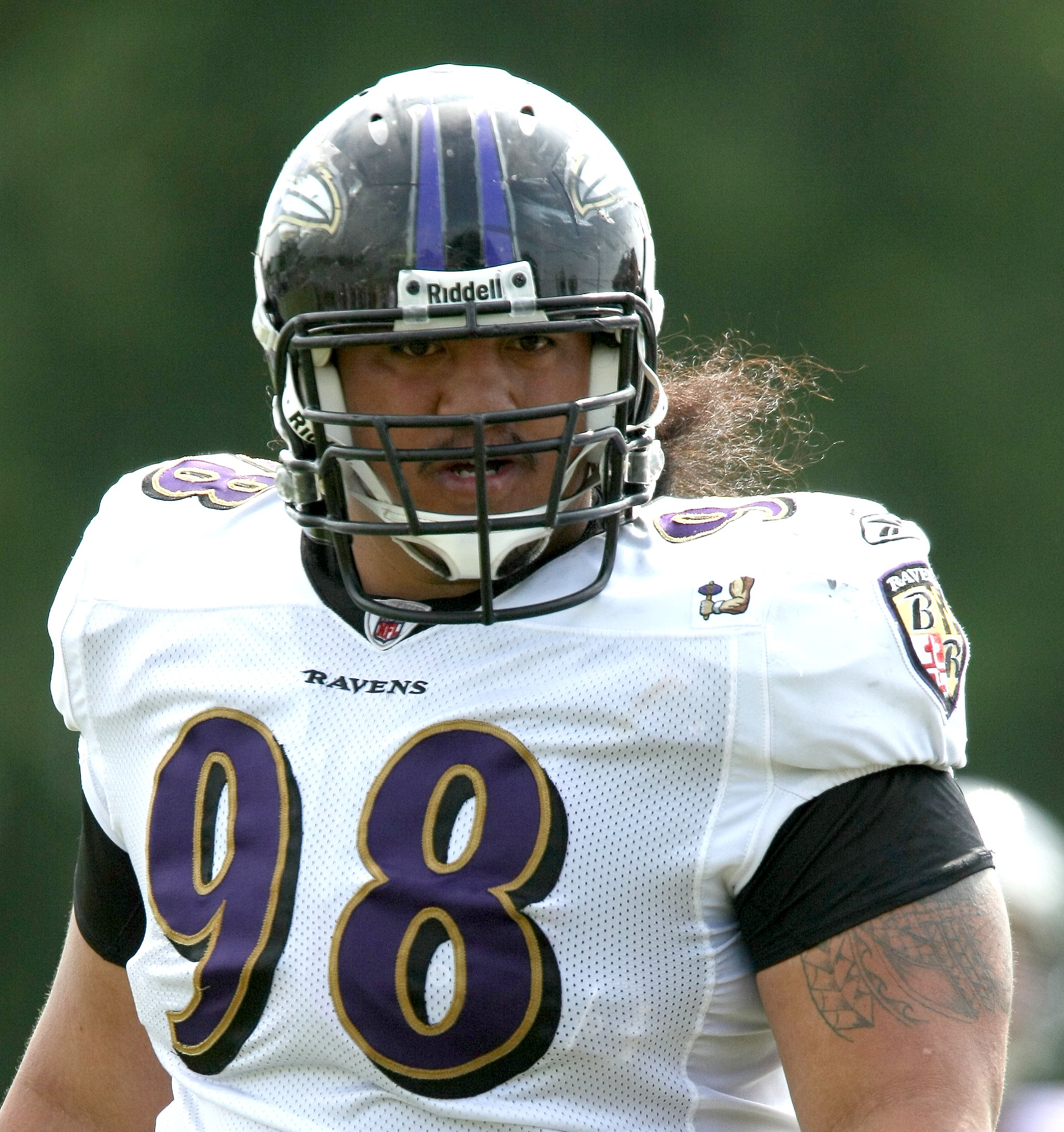
- Talavou with the Baltimore Ravens in 2009

No. 98
- Position: Defensive tackle

Personal information
- Born: October 4, 1984 (age 42); Santa Ana, California, U.S.
- Listed height: 6 ft 2 in (1.88 m)
- Listed weight: 334 lb (151 kg)

Career information
- College: Utah
- NFL draft: 2007: undrafted

Career history
- Atlanta Falcons (2007)*; Oakland Raiders (2007)*; Seattle Seahawks (2007–2008)*; Baltimore Ravens (2008–2010)
- * Offseason or practice squad member only

Awards and highlights
- First-team All-MW (2006)

Career NFL statistics
- Total tackles: 1
- Stats at Pro Football Reference

Kelly Simone Talavou (born October 4, 1984) is an American former professional football player who was a defensive tackle in the National Football League (NFL). He was signed by the Atlanta Falcons as an undrafted free agent in 2007, and was also a member of the Oakland Raiders, Seattle Seahawks and Baltimore Ravens.

Talavou played his junior and senior season college football for the Utah Utes, where he transferred from the University of Idaho in 2004. He lettered in his freshman and sophomore season with the Vandals. He spent his senior year in high school at Fountain Valley High School, where he was a two-way starter.
