= Jared Gaither =

American football player (born 1986)

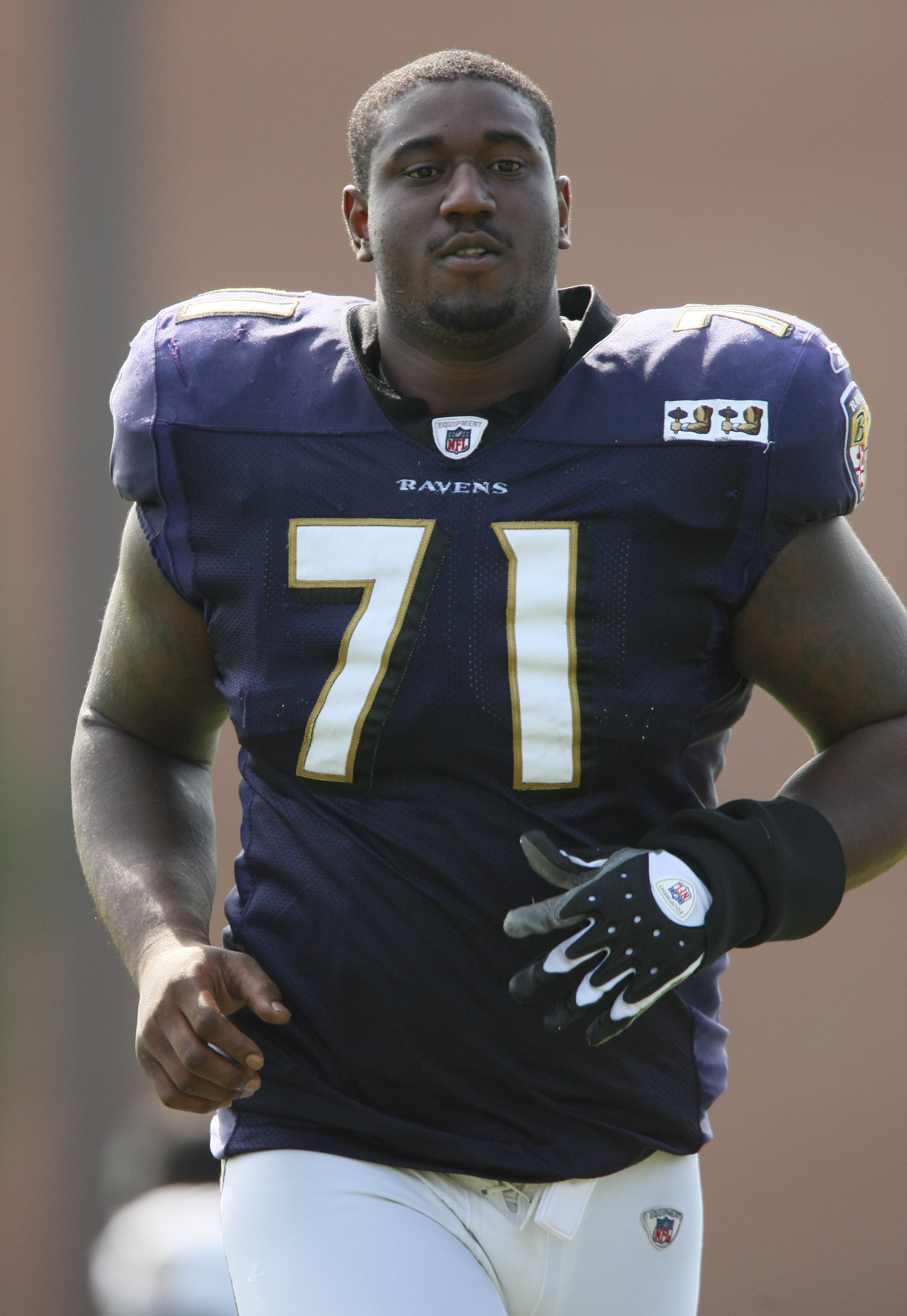
- Gaither with the Baltimore Ravens in 2009

No. 71, 78
- Position: Offensive tackle

Personal information
- Born: March 18, 1986 (age 40); White Plains, Maryland, U.S.
- Listed height: 6 ft 9 in (2.06 m)
- Listed weight: 335 lb (152 kg)

Career information
- High school: Hargrave Military (Chatham, Virginia)
- College: Maryland
- Supplemental draft: 2007: 5th round

Career history
- Baltimore Ravens (2007−2010); Kansas City Chiefs (2011); San Diego Chargers (2011−2012)

Career NFL statistics
- Games played: 52
- Games started: 37
- Stats at Pro Football Reference

Jared Dwight Gaither (born March 18, 1986) is an American former professional football player who was an offensive tackle in the National Football League (NFL). He was selected by the Baltimore Ravens in the fifth round of the 2007 supplemental draft. He played college football for the Maryland Terrapins.

Gaither played for the Ravens, Kansas City Chiefs, and San Diego Chargers.

== Early life ==
Gaither played basketball for his first three years of high school at Eleanor Roosevelt High School before playing football in his senior year at Hargrave Military Academy. He originally verbally committed to the University of South Carolina basketball team, but later changed to football. He played defensive tackle and tight end. He recorded 89 tackles, 9 sacks, 1 forced fumble, and 4 passes deflected.

== College career ==
As a true freshman at the University of Maryland in 2005, Gaither played in all 11 games and started the last 8. He was named a third-team Freshman All-American by College Football News and honorable mention by The Sporting News. He allowed no sacks in 583 snaps played (all at left tackle) and committed 2 penalties.

As a sophomore, Gaither played in twelve games and helped the Terps offensive line allow just 19 sacks all season. He was a member of the 2006 preseason watch list for the Outland Trophy, a consensus preseason All-ACC choice, and ranked No. 7 nationally among offensive tackles by The Sporting News.

== Professional career ==
Pre-draft measurables
Height	Weight	40-yard dash	10-yard split	20-yard split	20-yard shuttle	Three-cone drill	Vertical jump	Bench press
6 ft 8 5/8 in (2.05 m)	324 lb (147 kg)	4.98 s	1.70 s	2.86 s	4.49 s	7.12 s	32.0 in (0.81 m)	15 reps
All values from Pro Day

=== Baltimore Ravens ===
Gaither did not participate in 2007 spring practices at Maryland because of academic problems. On June 25, Terps coach Ralph Friedgen told reporters that Gaither's grades failed to meet his expectations, that he would not be able to play in 2007 and he would be eligible to return in 2008. Instead, Gaither declared for the NFL's supplemental draft and on July 12 was taken by the Baltimore Ravens in the fifth round. Gaither took over Jonathan Ogden's starting left tackle role after Ogden's retirement. At the time, Gaither, at 6' 9", was one of the tallest players in the NFL, with Demar Dotson of the Tampa Bay Buccaneers also being 6' 9" while Dennis Roland of the Cincinnati Bengals was even taller at 6' 10".

During the start of off-season camps for the 2008 NFL season, offensive coordinator Cam Cameron declared Gaither would be the starting left tackle. Despite an early ankle injury during the beginning of training camp, he played surprisingly well and was a big reason for the improved offensive line of the Baltimore Ravens.

On October 4, 2009, he suffered a head injury in a game vs. the New England Patriots and was sent to the hospital. He was taken to Massachusetts General Hospital, and had movement in his arms and legs. In addition, x-rays on his neck and shoulder were negative. Gaither missed all of 2010 after an injury put him on Injured Reserve (IR).

=== Kansas City Chiefs ===
On August 11, 2011, Gaither signed with the Kansas City Chiefs. He was waived on November 29, 2011.

=== San Diego Chargers ===
On November 30, 2011, Gaither was claimed off waivers by the San Diego Chargers. On March 14, 2012, Gaither signed a 4-year contract with the Chargers. Gaither was released on March 27, 2013.

== Personal life ==
He has advocated for the passage of the FIT Kids Act, federal legislation that would require school districts to report on students' physical activity and to give children health and nutritional information.
