= Bryan Mattison =

American football player (born 1984)

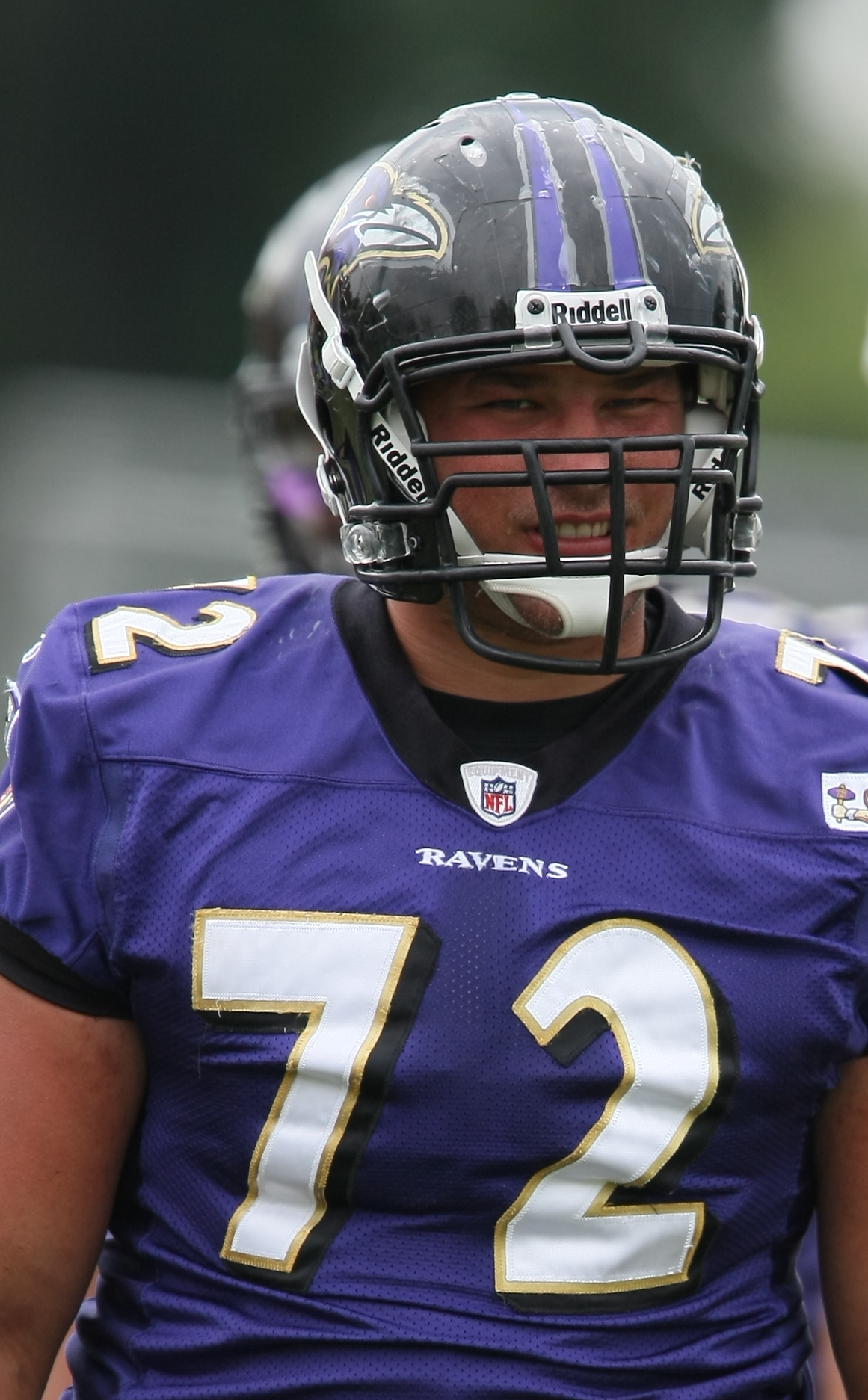
- Mattison with the Baltimore Ravens in 2009

No. 72, 67, 64
- Position: Center

Personal information
- Born: May 15, 1984 (age 42); Kalamazoo, Michigan, U.S.
- Listed height: 6 ft 3 in (1.91 m)
- Listed weight: 310 lb (141 kg)

Career information
- High school: Penn (Mishawaka, Indiana)
- College: Iowa
- NFL draft: 2008: undrafted

Career history
- New York Jets (2008)*; Baltimore Ravens (2008–2011); St. Louis Rams (2011); Kansas City Chiefs (2012)
- * Offseason or practice squad member only

Awards and highlights
- Sporting News Freshman All-Big Ten (2004); Second-team All-Big Ten (2007)

Career NFL statistics
- Games played: 19
- Games started: 4
- Fumble recoveries: 1
- Stats at Pro Football Reference

Bryan Mattison (born May 15, 1984) is an American former professional football player who was a center in the National Football League (NFL). He played college football as a defensive end for the Iowa Hawkeyes. He was signed by the New York Jets as an undrafted free agent in 2008, and was also a member of the Baltimore Ravens, St. Louis Rams, and the Kansas City Chiefs.

Mattison is the son of football coach Greg Mattison. Sister to the two-time Clinton Classic Mixed Division Champion, Lisa 'Mattison' Roberts.

== Early life ==
Mattison was born in Kalamazoo, Michigan, during his father's employment as an assistant football coach with Western Michigan University. Due to the nature of his father's profession, the Mattison family moved several times in Bryan's youth, living in Michigan, Maryland, Texas, Michigan again, and Indiana. Mattison graduated from Penn High School in Mishawaka, Indiana while his father was serving as an assistant at nearby Notre Dame.

While at Penn High School, Mattison was named one of the top 50 players in the State of Indiana by the Indiana Football Coaches Association and was also an Associated Press first-team all-state selection. As a senior, he collected 70 tackles, seven sacks and 16 tackles for loss en route to leading his team to a Class 5-A sectional championship. He was a two-year starter and also led his rugby union team to a state championship. He played in the 2003 U.S. Army All-American Bowl alongside fellow Iowa Hawkeye Drew Tate. Despite his father's presence on the Notre Dame staff, Mattison was not offered a scholarship to play for the Fighting Irish. Instead, he chose Iowa over offers from Colorado, Illinois, and Indiana.

== College career ==
After redshirting in 2003, Mattison played in all 12 games for the Hawkeyes in 2004. In limited playing time, he collected five tackles, one tackle for loss and one pass breakup.

Starting in all 12 games in 2005, Mattison amassed 46 tackles, 10 tackles for loss, four sacks, one pass breakup and one fumble recovery. His game against Indiana might have been his best, as he had a career-high nine tackles along with two tackles for loss, one sack and one pass breakup. Mattison also had three tackles against Minnesota as the Hawkeyes held the top rushing team in the nation to only 129 rushing yards.

As a junior in 2006, Mattison he recorded 59 tackles, seven sacks, 11 tackles for loss, six pass breakups, four forced fumbles and one fumble recovery. The game against Ohio State was one of his best, as he recorded eight tackles and one forced fumble. He also performed well against Michigan, recording five tackles, two sacks and a forced fumble as the Hawkeyes lost to the number two team in the nation. Named honorable mention all-Big Ten by both the media and the coaches, his four forced fumbles were fourth in the Big Ten and his seven sacks ranked eighth in the Big Ten.

== Professional career ==
Mattison was shifted from defensive end to guard in 2009 with the Baltimore Ravens. He spent parts of four seasons with Baltimore, before being waived on November 24, 2011. On November 25, 2011, he was signed by the St. Louis Rams. On September 26, 2012, he was signed by the Kansas City Chiefs. On May 2, 2013, Mattison was released by the Chiefs.

== Post-playing career ==
Mattison decided to retire from professional football in the spring of 2013, and turned down an opportunity to tryout for the Carolina Panthers. He spent the 2013 fall season serving as a volunteer assistant football coach at Penn High School, his alma mater in his hometown of Mishawaka.
