= Stefan Rodgers =

American gridiron football player (born 1981)

No. 64, 75
- Position: Offensive tackle

Personal information
- Born: November 3, 1981 (age 45); Little Rock, Arkansas, U.S.
- Listed height: 6 ft 5 in (1.96 m)
- Listed weight: 310 lb (141 kg)

Career information
- College: Lambuth
- NFL draft: 2005: undrafted

Career history
- Tennessee Titans (2005)*; Tampa Bay Buccaneers (2005–2006)*; Philadelphia Eagles (2006–2007); New York Jets (2008)*; Jacksonville Jaguars (2008); Baltimore Ravens (2009–2010)*; Hamilton Tiger-Cats (2011)*; Edmonton Eskimos (2011)*
- * Offseason or practice squad member only

Awards and highlights
- Second-team All-MSC (2003); First-team All-MSC (2004)

Stefan Lemar Rodgers (born November 3, 1981) is an American former professional football offensive tackle. He was signed by the Tennessee Titans as an undrafted free agent in 2005. He played college football at Lambuth.

Rodgers was also a member of the Tampa Bay Buccaneers, Philadelphia Eagles, New York Jets, Jacksonville Jaguars, Baltimore Ravens, Hamilton Tiger-Cats, and Edmonton Eskimos.
