= Davon Drew =

American football player (born 1985)

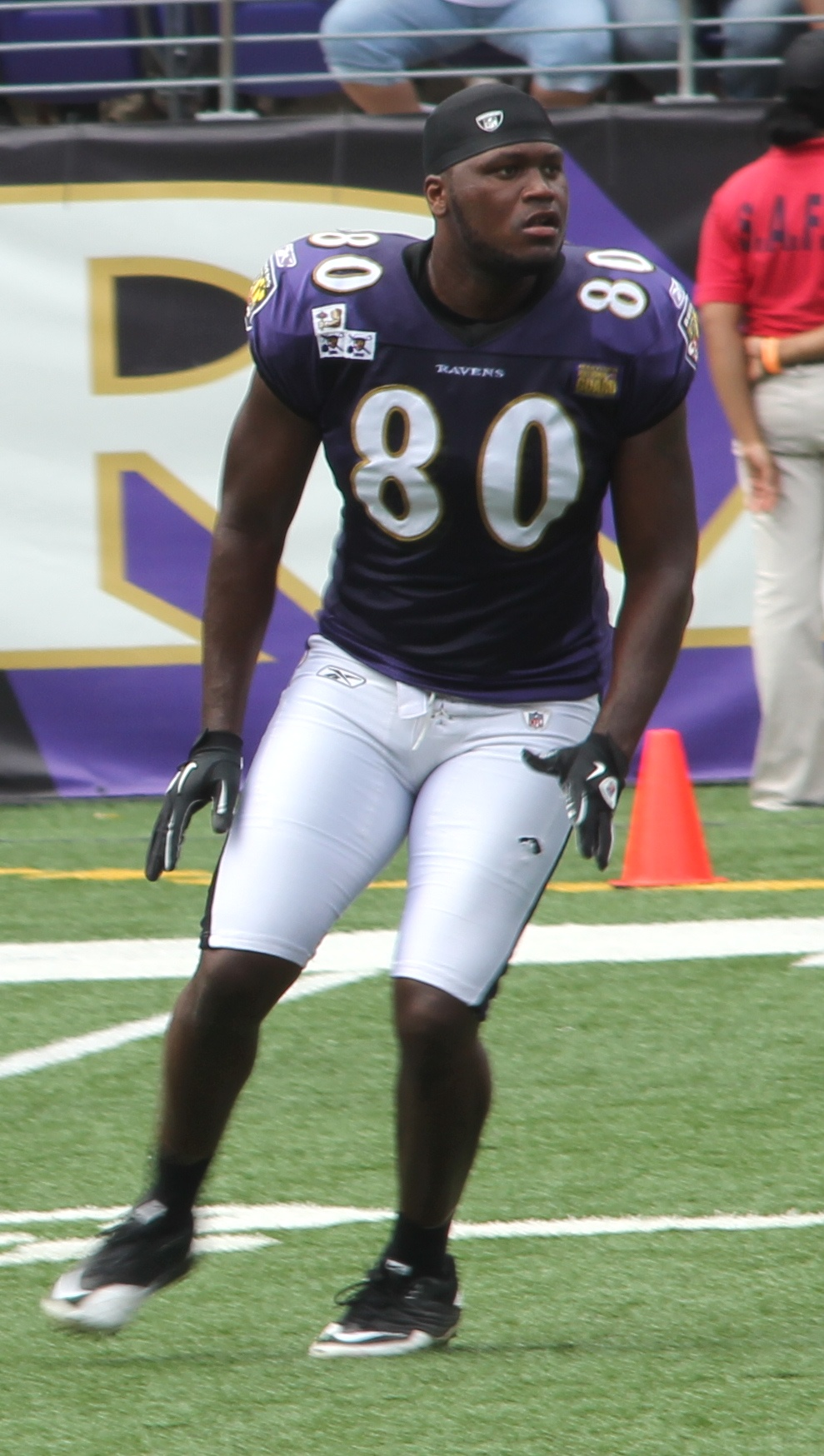
- Drew at M&T Bank Stadium practice in August 2011

No. 80
- Position: Tight end

Personal information
- Born: December 9, 1985 (age 40); New Bern, North Carolina, U.S.
- Listed height: 6 ft 4 in (1.93 m)
- Listed weight: 255 lb (116 kg)

Career information
- High school: New Bern
- College: East Carolina
- NFL draft: 2009: 5th round, 149th overall pick

Career history
- Baltimore Ravens (2009)*; Miami Dolphins (2009)*; Baltimore Ravens (2009–2011)
- * Offseason or practice squad member only

Awards and highlights
- Third-team All-Conference USA (2006)
- Stats at Pro Football Reference

Davon Anthony Drew (born December 9, 1985) is an American former professional football player who was a tight end in the National Football League (NFL). He was selected 149th overall by the Baltimore Ravens in the fifth round of the 2009 NFL draft. He played college football for the East Carolina Pirates as a quarterback before switching to tight end because of his size and speed. Drew also played for the Miami Dolphins at one point in his career.
