= Devard Darling =

American football player (born 1982)

No. 81
- Position: Wide receiver

Personal information
- Born: April 16, 1982 (age 44); Nassau, Bahamas
- Listed height: 6 ft 1 in (1.85 m)
- Listed weight: 213 lb (97 kg)

Career information
- High school: Stephen F. Austin (Sugar Land, Texas, U.S.)
- College: Washington State
- NFL draft: 2004: 3rd round, 82nd overall pick

Career history
- Baltimore Ravens (2004–2007); Kansas City Chiefs (2008–2009); Omaha Nighthawks (2010); Houston Texans (2011)*
- * Offseason or practice squad member only

Career NFL statistics
- Receptions: 37
- Receiving yards: 578
- Receiving touchdowns: 4
- Stats at Pro Football Reference

Devard Loran Darling (born April 16, 1982) is a Bahamian-American former professional football wide receiver. After playing college football at Florida State University and Washington State, he was selected by the Baltimore Ravens in the third round of the 2004 NFL draft and went on to play for the Kansas City Chiefs and Houston Texans.

== Early life ==
Born in the Bahamas, Darling attended Nassau Christian Academy before relocating to the United States. He attended Stephen F. Austin High School in Sugar Land, Texas and won three varsity letters in football, two in track, and one in basketball. In football, he won All-District honors and was named the 28th best prospect in the state of Texas by SuperPrep.

== College career ==
Darling attended Florida State University until the death of his identical twin brother, Devaughn Darling. After his brother died during practice, due to exhaustion, possibly tied to a sickle cell trait, FSU doctors would not clear him medically to return to the football team. He subsequently transferred to Washington State University, and finished his career with 105 receptions for 1,630 yards (15.7 yards per reception average) and 30 receiving touchdowns.

== Professional career ==
=== Baltimore Ravens ===
Darling was selected by the Baltimore Ravens in the third round of the 2004 NFL draft. He signed a three-year contract worth about $1.5 million with the team on July 26, 2004. He was placed on injured reserve on October 29 due to a heel injury. Darling missed most of 2005 and 2006 to injuries as well. He was tendered to a one-year contract worth $850,000 on March 1, 2007. On September 27, he was fined $7,500 by the league for an unsportsmanlike conduct penalty he received in week 3 after following Yamon Figurs into the stands following a touchdown. He had a breakout game on November 18, 2007 against the Cleveland Browns with four catches for 107 yards and his first NFL touchdown.

Darling had 20 catches for 331 yards and three touchdowns in his career with the Ravens.

=== Kansas City Chiefs ===
On March 11, 2008, Darling signed a three-year contract with the Kansas City Chiefs. On September 7, Darling broke free for what looked to be a game-tying touchdown against the New England Patriots, but he was tackled on 5-yard line. Kansas City ended up losing the game. He ultimately would score only one touchdown while with the Chiefs. He was placed on injured reserve on September 1, 2009. He was released by the Chiefs on March 3, 2010.

=== Omaha Nighthawks ===
Darling was signed by the Omaha Nighthawks of the United Football League on September 8, 2010.

=== Houston Texans ===
On August 8, 2011, Darling signed with the Houston Texans. He was released on September 3, 2011.

== Personal life ==
Darling is the younger brother of Bahamian track athlete Dennis Darling and the brother-in-law of his wife Tonique Williams-Darling.

Devard's twin brother, Devaughn Darling, died in 2001 during a football practice at Florida State University. In 2005, the university agreed to pay the Darling family $2 million in a wrongful death settlement, but under Florida state law, they could only pay a maximum of $200,000 unless a claims bill was passed allowing them to pay any more that that. In 2017, the bill allowing for the remaining $1.8 million to be paid out was finally passed, bringing the twelve-year-long legal proceedings to an end.
