= Baltimore Ravens Ring of Honor =

Commemorative decoration in M&T Bank Stadium

Coordinates: 39°16′41″N 76°37′22″W

The Baltimore Ravens Ring of Honor is a display encircling the field of M&T Bank Stadium in Baltimore, Maryland, honoring former players and personnel who have made outstanding contributions to the Baltimore Ravens and Baltimore Colts football organizations.

The Ring of Honor began in 2000, with the induction of Earnest Byner. In 2002, eight former Baltimore Colts players were added, followed by the induction of then-owner Art Modell a year later. Ten players and former head coach Brian Billick have been inducted since. Terrell Suggs became the latest member after being inducted on October 22, 2023.

== Inductees ==
Key/Legend

| Inducted or Enshrined in the Pro Football Hall of Fame |
| Pro Football Hall of Fame finalist |
**Bold** numbers indicate jersey numbers not in circulation

**Baltimore Ravens Ring of Honor members**
| # | **Inductee** | **Position(s)** | **Seasons in Baltimore** | **Date of Induction** | **Achievements in Baltimore** |
| 21 | Earnest Byner | RB, executive | 1996–2003 (8) | November 26, 2000 | The "tie between two cities" |
| **19** | Johnny Unitas | QB | 1956–1972 (17) | October 20, 2002 | 10 Pro Bowl selections, 7 All-Pro selections, 4× NFL MVP |
| 24 | Lenny Moore | HB | 1956–1967 (12) | October 20, 2002 | 7 Pro Bowl selections, 7 All-Pro selections |
| 70 | Art Donovan | DT | 1953–1961 (9) | October 20, 2002 | 5 Pro Bowl selections, 4 All-Pro selections |
| 77 | Jim Parker | OL | 1957–1967 (11) | October 20, 2002 | 8 Pro Bowl selections, 10 All-Pro selections |
| 82 | Raymond Berry | WR | 1955–1967 (13) | October 20, 2002 | 6 Pro Bowl selections, 5 All-Pro selections |
| 83 | Ted Hendricks | LB | 1969–1973 (5) | October 20, 2002 | 3 Pro Bowl selections, 3 All-Pro selections |
| 88 | John Mackey | TE | 1963–1971 (9) | October 20, 2002 | 5 Pro Bowl selections, 3 All-Pro selections |
| 89 | Gino Marchetti | DE | 1953–1966 (14) | October 20, 2002 | 11 Pro Bowl selections, 10 All-Pro selections |
| — | Art Modell | Principal owner | 1996–2003 (8) | January 3, 2004 | Returned the NFL to Baltimore |
| 99 | Michael McCrary | DE | 1997–2002 (6) | October 4, 2004 | 2 Pro Bowl selections, 1 All-Pro selection |
| 58 | Peter Boulware | LB | 1997–2005 (9) | November 5, 2006 | 4 Pro Bowl selections, 1 All-Pro selection, Defensive Rookie of the Year |
| **75** | Jonathan Ogden | OT | 1996–2007 (12) | October 26, 2008 | 11 Pro Bowl selections, 9 All-Pro selections |
| 3 | Matt Stover | PK | 1996–2008 (13) | November 20, 2011 | 1 Pro Bowl selection, 2 All-Pro selections |
| 31 | Jamal Lewis | RB | 2000–2006 (7) | September 27, 2012 | 1 Pro Bowl selection, 1 All-Pro selection, Offensive Player of the Year, 2,000-yard club |
| **52** | Ray Lewis | LB | 1996–2012 (17) | September 22, 2013 | 13 Pro Bowl selections, 10 All-Pro selections, 2× Defensive Player of Year, Super Bowl MVP |
| 86 | Todd Heap | TE | 2001–2010 (10) | September 28, 2014 | 2 Pro Bowl selections, 1 All-Pro selection |
| **20** | Ed Reed | FS | 2002–2012 (11) | November 22, 2015 | 9 Pro Bowl selections, 8 All-Pro selections, Defensive Player of Year |
| — | Brian Billick | Head coach | 1999–2007 (9) | September 29, 2019 | Super Bowl champion (XXXV), AFC champion, 2 AFC North championships, 4 Playoff Berths |
| 92 | Haloti Ngata | DT | 2006–2014 (9) | October 11, 2021 | 5 Pro Bowl selections, 5 All-Pro selections |
| **73** | Marshal Yanda | OG | 2007–2019 (13) | December 4, 2022 | 8 Pro Bowl selections, 7 All-Pro selections |
| **55** | Terrell Suggs | LB | 2003–2018 (16) | October 22, 2023 | 7 Pro Bowl selections, 2 All-Pro selections, Defensive Player of Year, Defensive Rookie of the Year |
