= Brian Billick =

American football player, coach and commentator (born 1954)

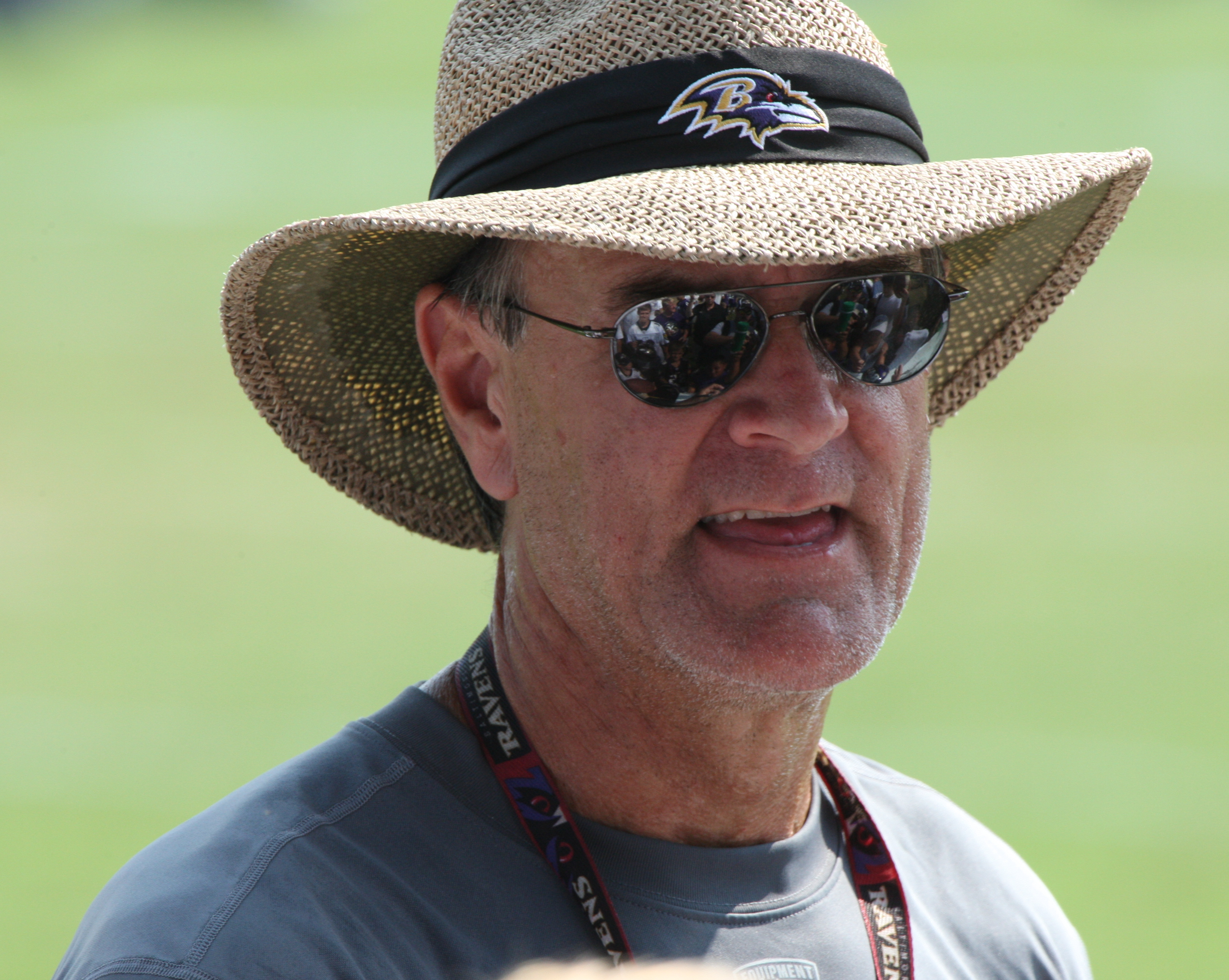
- Billick during 2007 training camp

Personal information
- Born: February 28, 1954 (age 72); Fairborn, Ohio, U.S.
- Listed height: 6 ft 5 in (1.96 m)
- Listed weight: 235 lb (107 kg)

Career information
- High school: Redlands (Redlands, California)
- College: Air Force (1972); BYU (1973–1976)
- NFL draft: 1977: 11th round, 295th overall pick

Career history

Playing
- San Francisco 49ers (1977)*; Dallas Cowboys (1977)*
- * Offseason or practice squad member only

Coaching
- Redlands (1977–1978) Volunteer wide receivers coach; BYU (1978) Graduate assistant; San Diego State (1981–1985) Tight ends; Utah State (1986–1988) Offensive coordinator; Stanford (1989–1991) Assistant head coach & tight ends coach; Minnesota Vikings (1992–1993) Tight ends coach; Minnesota Vikings (1994–1998) Offensive coordinator; Baltimore Ravens (1999–2007) Head coach; Arizona State (2022) Advisor to head coach & offensive analyst

Awards and highlights
- Super Bowl champion (XXXV); PFWA NFL Assistant Coach of the Year (1998); Baltimore Ravens Ring of Honor

Head coaching record
- Regular season: 80–64 (.556)
- Postseason: 5–3 (.625)
- Career: 85–67 (.559)
- Coaching profile at Pro Football Reference

Brian Harold Billick (born February 28, 1954) is an American former football coach and commentator. He was the offensive coordinator for the Minnesota Vikings from 1994 to 1998; the team broke the NFL scoring record in the 1998 season. He then spent nine seasons as head coach of the Baltimore Ravens from January 19, 1999, to December 31, 2007.

On January 28, 2001, Billick won Super Bowl XXXV as the Ravens' head coach in a 34–7 victory over the New York Giants. It was the Ravens' first Super Bowl appearance. He was inducted into the Baltimore Ravens Ring of Honor in 2019.

== Early life ==
Brian Billick was born in Fairborn, Ohio and grew up in the city of Redlands, California with five siblings. He played both football and basketball at Redlands High School; the school retired his football jersey number in 2001 and inducted him into the school's hall of fame in 2004. Billick was teammates with future Major League Baseball player Julio Cruz on the school's basketball team.

== Playing career ==
Billick started his college career playing linebacker at the United States Air Force Academy. He transferred to Brigham Young University after his freshman year, where he played tight end. In his senior season, Billick earned all-Western Athletic Conference honors and an All-America honorable mention.

Billick was selected in the 11th round with the 295th overall pick of the 1977 NFL draft by the San Francisco 49ers. After being released by the 49ers, he was signed and then released by the Dallas Cowboys; he retired as a player without playing in a National Football League game.

== Coaching career ==
=== College ===
In 1977, after being cut by the 49ers, Billick appeared as a contestant on TV's Match Game PM. He later returned to his hometown of Redlands, California, and served as a volunteer wide receivers coach for the University of Redlands football team (NAIA), under coach Frank Serrao. That season, he also split time as an assistant coach at Redlands High School. Billick said he coached the high school team's practice from 2 to 4 p.m., then headed over to the university for the college practice.

Billick worked as a graduate assistant at Brigham Young for one season (1978) before joining the 49ers as the assistant director of public relations for two years (1979–1980).

He returned to coaching with San Diego State University, serving as the tight ends coach and recruiting coordinator for five seasons (1981–1985) under Doug Scovil. After being named the offensive coordinator of Utah State University, Billick improved the second-worst offense in Division I-A into a top-10 offense in three seasons (1986–1988).

Billick was then hired as the assistant head coach and tight ends coach at Stanford by Dennis Green, serving both roles for three seasons (1989–91).

=== National Football League ===
==== Assistant coach ====
Billick, following newly named Vikings head coach Denny Green, was hired as an assistant coach by the Vikings for the 1992 season. The Vikings made the playoffs during six of the seven seasons (1992–1998) that Billick spent with the team, and set several offensive records in the process. In 1998, Minnesota set an NFL record for most points scored in a season (556) (which has since been broken by the 2007 New England Patriots and the 2013 Denver Broncos), and set a team record with 41 touchdown passes. His work under Minnesota head coach Dennis Green put Billick in the Bill Walsh coaching tree.

==== Head coach ====
Billick became the second head coach in Baltimore Ravens history on January 20, 1999, when he was appointed to replace Ted Marchibroda. He had an 85–67 record in nine seasons (1999–2007) with the team, including 5–3 in the playoffs. He won a Super Bowl title in Super Bowl XXXV over the New York Giants.

Although Billick had the opportunity to interview for the head coach job of the reactivated Cleveland Browns and was rumored to be their top candidate, he chose to interview with the Ravens first. He signed with Baltimore in under 24 hours after his initial interview.

In his first season with the Ravens in 1999, Billick led the team to its first non-losing record (8–8) in the franchise's four-year history.

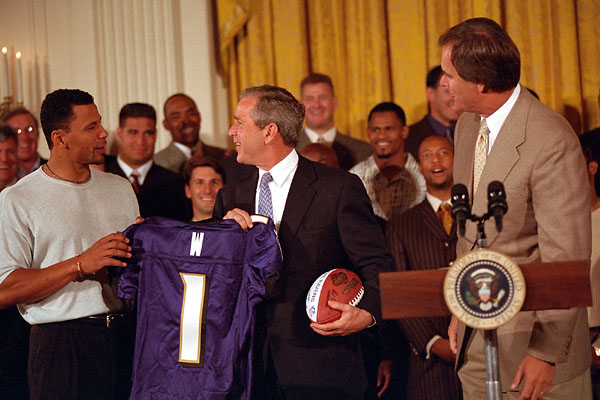
Billick (far right) and the rest of the 2000 Ravens meet U.S. president George W. Bush in 2001.

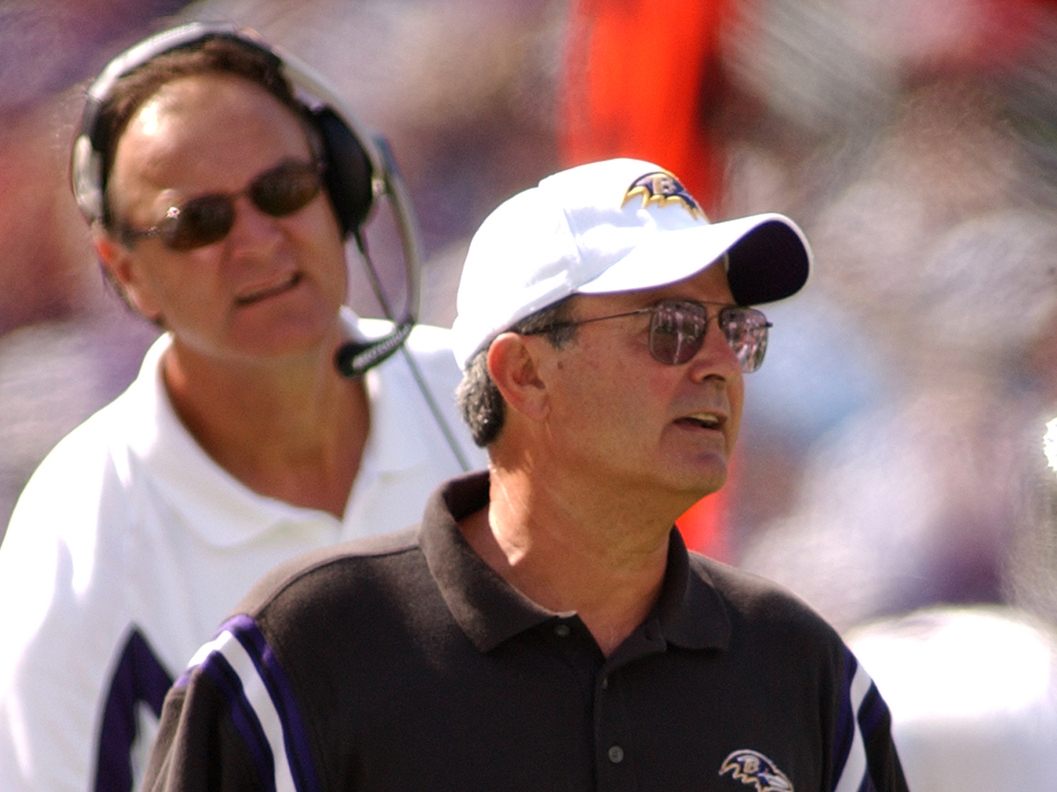
Billick and Gary Zauner in 2003.

The next season in 2000, the Ravens finished with a 12–4 record and earned their first playoff berth. Prior to reaching the playoffs, Billick forbade his players from using either the term "playoffs" or the term "Super Bowl," with the idea of keeping them focused on winning each game instead of on a more distant prize. Billick felt this approach would help them reach that goal, and went so far as to fine Tony Siragusa for violating the rule. In response, the players borrowed the term "Festivus" from the television series Seinfeld for the playoffs, and the term Festivus Maximus for the Super Bowl. When they reached the playoffs, Billick lifted this ban. The Ravens took advantage of their vaunted defense, which allowed an NFL record-low 165 points in the regular season (for a point differential of 168; the Ravens also led the league in turnover differential at +23) during the playoffs to advance to Super Bowl XXXV against the New York Giants. It was a blowout 34–7 victory, giving Billick his only Super Bowl victory.

Billick led the Ravens to a 10–6 record in 2001 and a victory over the Miami Dolphins in the Wild Card Round before losing to their division rivals, the Pittsburgh Steelers in the Divisional Round. Baltimore finished 7–9 and missed the playoffs in 2002, but bounced back in 2003 with a 10–6 record and the franchise's first division title; the key game of this season was a 44–41 overtime win over the Seattle Seahawks in which the Ravens scored 20 unanswered points from the 10:14 mark of the fourth quarter through overtime; the win launched the then 5–5 Ravens into the division title. The Ravens lost to the Tennessee Titans, 20–17, in the Wild Card Round of the playoffs.

The Ravens missed the playoffs in 2004 with a 9–7 record and in 2005 with a 6–10 record before bouncing back in the 2006 season. Billick fired offensive coordinator Jim Fassel on October 17, 2006, assuming the role for the remainder of the season, as the Ravens earned a franchise best 13–3 record, won the AFC North, and earned the first playoff bye in team history. Baltimore, however, lost to the eventual Super Bowl XLI champion Indianapolis Colts, 15–6, in the Divisional Round.

Billick was fired on December 31, 2007, one day after the conclusion of a 5–11 season punctuated by a Week 15 22–16 overtime loss to the previously winless Miami Dolphins at Dolphin Stadium on December 16. He was succeeded by John Harbaugh on January 19, 2008.

For his contributions to the organization, including leading them to their first Super Bowl victory, Billick would eventually be inducted into the Baltimore Ravens Ring of Honor on September 29, 2019.

Billick's 85 victories were the most in Ravens history until 2015 when John Harbaugh surpassed him with his 86th win.

=== Post-NFL career ===
Billick coached the Team Kai squad of college football all-stars in the 2022 Hula Bowl, winning the game, 21–20. He was later hired as an offensive analyst and advisor to the head coach for the Arizona State Sun Devils football program. Billick returned to coach Team Kai in the 2023 Hula Bowl, which his team again won. In 2026, he participated in The American Bowl as coach of the Guardians.

== Broadcasting career ==
When the Ravens were eliminated in the playoffs in 2003, Billick was used as a studio analyst by ABC Sports. After being fired by the Ravens, Billick became a draft analyst for the NFL Network during the 2008 NFL draft. Billick then became a game analyst for the NFL on Fox during the 2008 NFL season, working alongside Thom Brennaman. Billick related in 2019 an exchange with Jimmy Johnson (also a former champion coach-turned-broadcaster for Fox) that gave Billick perspective on if he wanted to return to coaching (while Billick fully intended to do): "Don’t go back unless it’s in your bones. Too many of us go back. I was one of them. I went back for the wrong reasons. If you go back for ego, if you go back for money, it’s the wrong reason." Billick grew to like the broadcasting job and the increased free time it gave to him. On NFL on Fox, his broadcasting partner for the 2009 NFL season was Brennaman. On NFL Network, Billick appeared alongside Dennis Green on The Coaches Show, as well as Sterling Sharpe and Brian Baldinger on Thursday and Friday editions of Playbook, the ultimate NFL “Xs and Os” program utilizing the same “all 22” game film that coaches and players use to preview upcoming games. He also serves as an analyst on NFL Network's signature show NFL Total Access and has provided on location analysis for the Network's coverage of the NFL Scouting Combine and NFL draft. He often appeared on ESPN's Mike and Mike in the Morning to discuss football matchups and news. Billick left Fox after the 2013 season.

== Personal life ==
Billick and his wife, Kim have two daughters, Aubrey and Keegan. Billick recently relocated to Columbus, Ohio to be near his daughter while she attends Ohio State University.

Through his daughter Keegan, Billick is the father-in-law of former NBA player Jon Leuer. Billick is also the brother-in-law to fellow former NFL head coach Mike Smith.

== Head coaching record ==
Team	Year	Regular season					Postseason			
Team	Year	Won	Lost	Ties	Win %	Finish	Won	Lost	Win %	Result
BAL	1999	8	8	0	.500	3rd in AFC Central	-	-	-	-
BAL	2000	12	4	0	.750	2nd in AFC Central	4	0	1.000	Super Bowl XXXV champions
BAL	2001	10	6	0	.625	2nd in AFC Central	1	1	.500	Lost to Pittsburgh Steelers in AFC Divisional Game
BAL	2002	7	9	0	.438	3rd in AFC North	-	-	-	-
BAL	2003	10	6	0	.625	1st in AFC North	0	1	.000	Lost to Tennessee Titans in AFC wild card game
BAL	2004	9	7	0	.563	2nd in AFC North	-	-	-	-
BAL	2005	6	10	0	.375	3rd in AFC North	-	-	-	-
BAL	2006	13	3	0	.813	1st in AFC North	0	1	.000	Lost to Indianapolis Colts in AFC Divisional Game
BAL	2007	5	11	0	.313	4th in AFC North	-	-	-	-
BAL Total		80	64	0	.556		5	3	.625	
Total		80	64	0	.556		5	3	.625	
