= Terrell Suggs =

American football player (born 1982)

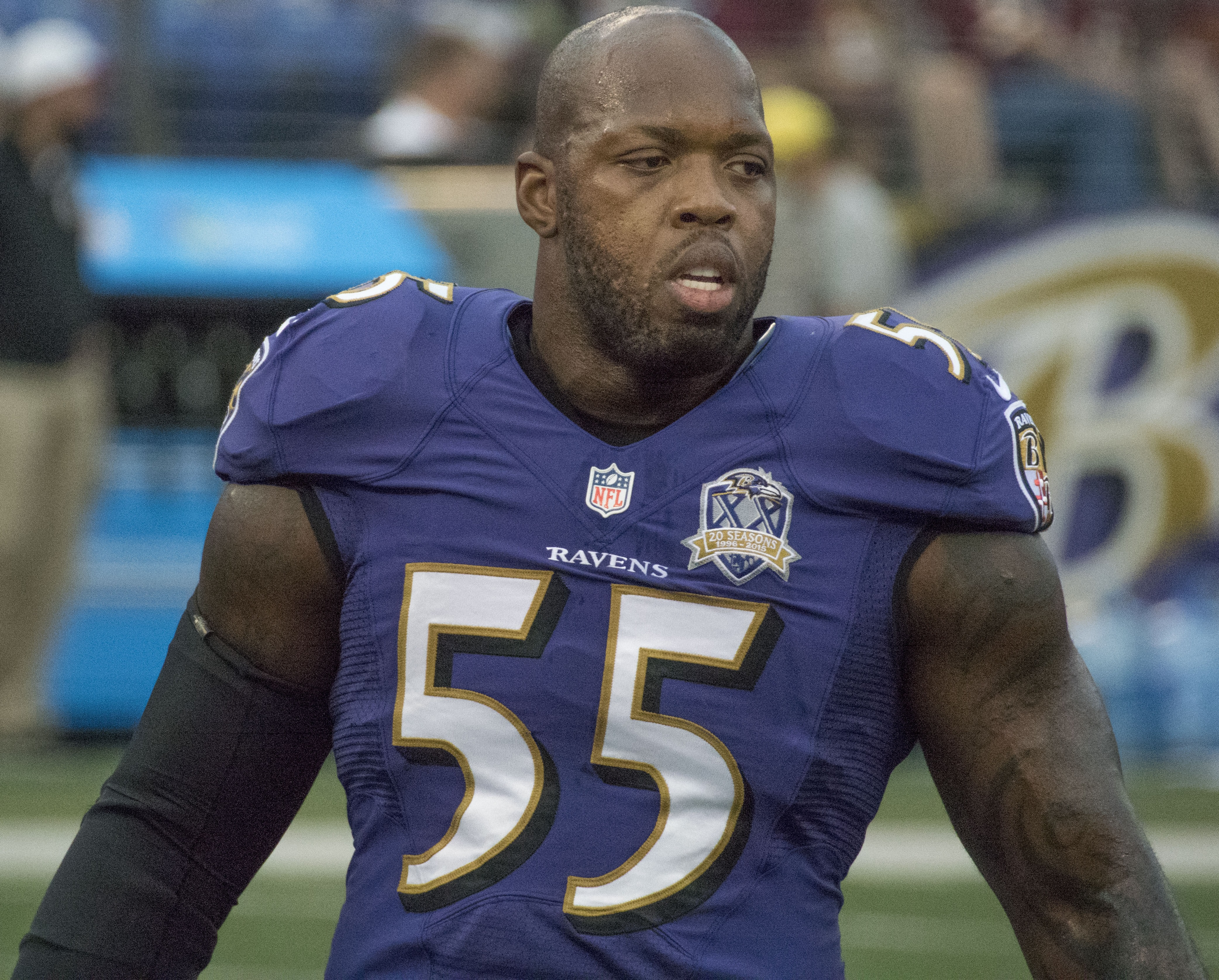
- Suggs with the Baltimore Ravens in 2015

No. 55, 56, 94
- Position: Linebacker

Personal information
- Born: October 11, 1982 (age 44); Minneapolis, Minnesota, U.S.
- Listed height: 6 ft 3 in (1.91 m)
- Listed weight: 265 lb (120 kg)

Career information
- High school: Hamilton (Chandler, Arizona)
- College: Arizona State (2000–2002)
- NFL draft: 2003: 1st round, 10th overall pick

Career history
- Baltimore Ravens (2003–2018); Arizona Cardinals (2019); Kansas City Chiefs (2019)

Awards and highlights
- 2× Super Bowl champion (XLVII, LIV); NFL Defensive Player of the Year (2011); NFL Defensive Rookie of the Year (2003); First-team All-Pro (2011); Second-team All-Pro (2008); 7× Pro Bowl (2004, 2006, 2008, 2010, 2011, 2013, 2017); 2× NFL forced fumbles leader (2003, 2011); Butkus Award (pro) (2011); PFWA All-Rookie Team (2003); Baltimore Ravens Ring of Honor; Ted Hendricks Award (2002); Lombardi Award (2002); Bronko Nagurski Trophy (2002); Bill Willis Trophy (2002); Morris Trophy (2002); Unanimous All-American (2002); Pac-10 Defensive Player of the Year (2002); 2× First-team All-Pac-10 (2001, 2002); Pac-10 Freshman of the Year (2000); NFL record: Most career tackles for loss: 202

Career NFL statistics
- Tackles: 886
- Sacks: 139
- Forced fumbles: 39
- Fumble recoveries: 15
- Pass deflections: 60
- Interceptions: 7
- Defensive touchdowns: 3
- Stats at Pro Football Reference

Terrell Raymonn Suggs (born October 11, 1982), nicknamed "T-Sizzle", is an American former professional football player who was a linebacker for 17 seasons in the National Football League (NFL). He played college football for the Arizona State Sun Devils, and was recognized as a unanimous All-American. He was selected by the Baltimore Ravens with the 10th overall pick in the 2003 NFL draft, and is the franchise's all-time leader in sacks. He also played for the Arizona Cardinals and the Kansas City Chiefs.

Suggs is a seven-time Pro Bowl selection, a two time All-Pro, and was named NFL Defensive Player of the Year in 2011. Suggs won two Super Bowls in his career, Super Bowl XLVII in 2012 with the Ravens and Super Bowl LIV in 2019 with the Chiefs. Suggs is eighth on the NFL's all-time sacks list (tracked since 1982) and first all-time in tackles for loss (tracked since 1999). He is fourth all-time in postseason sacks.

== Early life ==
Suggs was born in Minneapolis, Minnesota, and raised in St. Paul. While growing up in Saint Paul, he played youth football, as a center, with future major league MVP baseball player Joe Mauer as quarterback. Suggs moved to Arizona after the eighth grade. As a teenager, he attended multiple schools, the first being Chandler High School. He later transferred to Hamilton High School where he set the Arizona Class 5A record for rushing yards in a game with 367 against Yuma Kofa as a junior in 1999.

As a senior, Suggs was named a Parade high school All-American in 2000, Gatorade Arizona Player of the Year, the No. 1 jumbo athlete in the nation by SuperPrep Magazine, Arizona Player of the Year by USA Today as well as an All-American by USA Today and the 60th-best player in the nation by Sporting News.

In addition to football, Suggs played AAU basketball.

== College career ==
Suggs decided to attend Arizona State University, where he played defensive end for coach Bruce Snyder and coach Dirk Koetter's Arizona State Sun Devils football teams from 2000 to 2002. He finished his career with 163 tackles, including a school, career-record 65.5 tackles for losses, and 44 quarterback sacks, 14 forced fumbles, three fumble recoveries, two interceptions, and nine passes deflected. He set an NCAA single-season record with 24 sacks in 2002. Following his 2002 junior season, he was a first-team All-Pac-10 selection and the Pac-10 Defensive Player of the Year. He won the Bronko Nagurski Award, the Ted Hendricks Award, and the Vince Lombardi Award. He was recognized as a unanimous first-team All-American.

== Professional career ==
Pre-draft measurables
Height	Weight	Arm length	Hand span	40-yard dash	10-yard split	20-yard split	20-yard shuttle	Vertical jump	Bench press	Wonderlic
6 ft 3 3/8 in (1.91 m)	262 lb (119 kg)	32 in (0.81 m)	8 7/8 in (0.23 m)	4.84 s	1.66 s	2.78 s	4.47 s	33.0 in (0.84 m)	19 reps	31
All values from NFL Combine/Pro Day

=== Baltimore Ravens ===
==== 2003 ====
Suggs was selected by the Baltimore Ravens in the first round with the 10th overall pick in the 2003 NFL draft, becoming one of the youngest defensive players ever drafted at only 20 years old.

Suggs enjoyed immediate success as a rookie in 2003 as he tied an NFL record by posting a sack in each of his first four games. He finished the season with 27 tackles (19 solo), 12 sacks (a Ravens franchise rookie record), six forced fumbles, two pass deflections, and one interception, earning him Defensive Rookie of the Year honors while only starting one game that year.

==== 2004 ====
In 2004, Suggs was elected to his first Pro Bowl as he recorded 10.5 sacks and 60 tackles (45 solo).

==== 2005 ====
In 2005, the Ravens' new defensive coordinator Rex Ryan, son of famous defensive coordinator Buddy Ryan, moved Suggs from outside linebacker to defensive end in many of the defensive schemes. In Week 13, Suggs earned AFC Defensive Player of the Week for his game against the Houston Texans. Despite registering a then-career-low eight sacks, Suggs also set new career-highs in tackles with 69 (46 solo) and interceptions with two.

==== 2006 ====
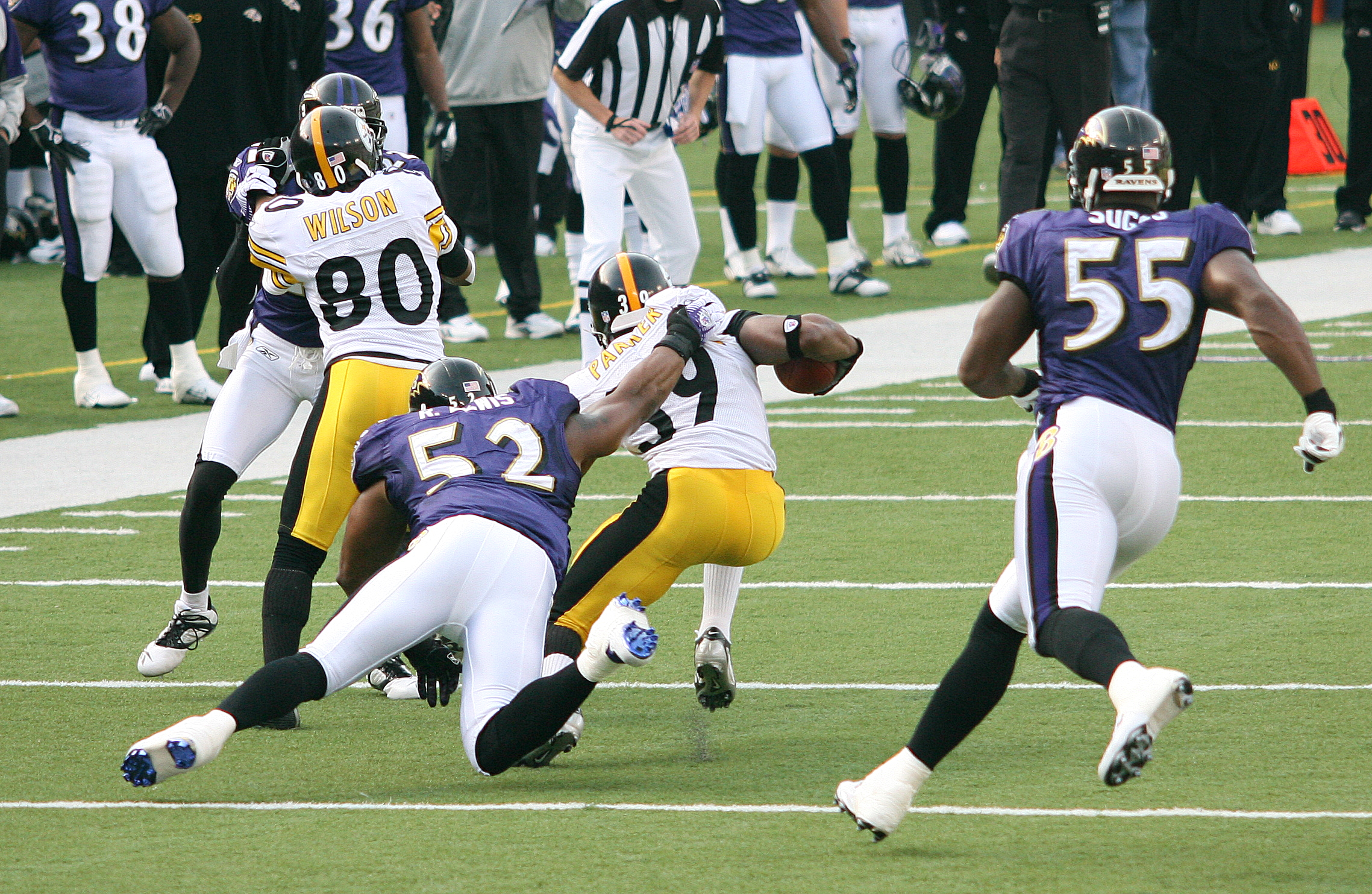
Suggs (55) and Ray Lewis playing against the Pittsburgh Steelers in 2006.

In 2006, Suggs was part of the NFL's best overall defense, the unit allowing a league-low 12.6 points per game. He recorded 64 tackles (46 solo), 9.5 sacks, and set a new career-high in pass deflections with eight. After the season, he was voted to the Pro Bowl for the second time. He was a major contributor as the Ravens went 13–3. For the season, Suggs started nine games at right defensive end in the Ravens base 4–3 and seven games at outside linebacker when the Ravens started game in a base 3–4 defense. Suggs earned attention for his flashy playing style, "Suggs evolved into one of the league's best pass-rushers whether he is blitzing as a linebacker or rushing from defensive end with one hand on the ground."

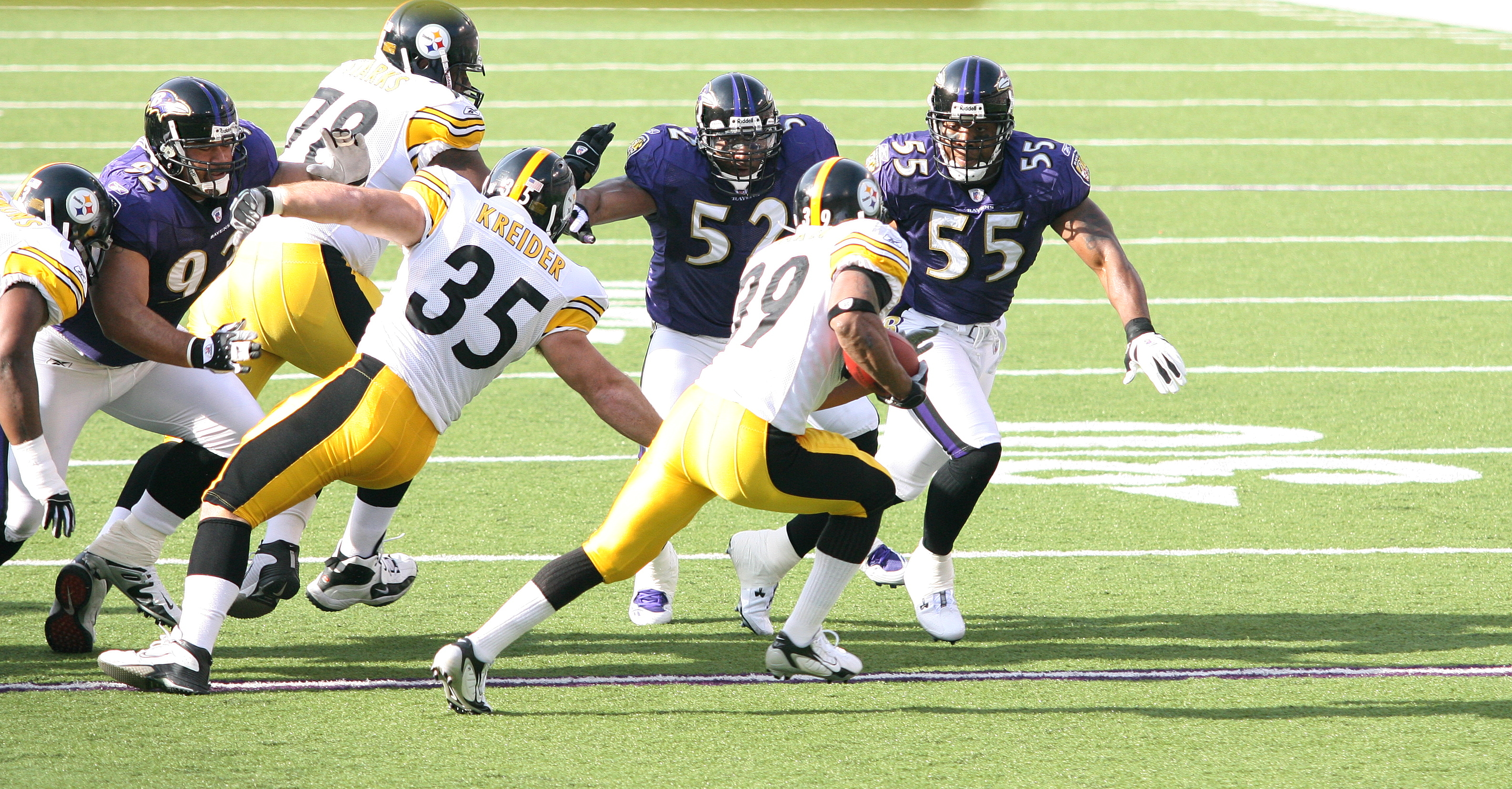
From left to right: Haloti Ngata, Lewis, and Suggs chasing down Willie Parker of the Steelers in 2006.

==== 2007 ====
The following season in 2007, Suggs made 80 tackles (52 solo) and five sacks, as he and the Ravens plummeted to 5–11. Like the season before, Suggs was a hybrid defensive end/linebacker, playing 50 percent of the defensive snaps at defensive end in the Ravens base 4–3 defense.

==== 2008 ====
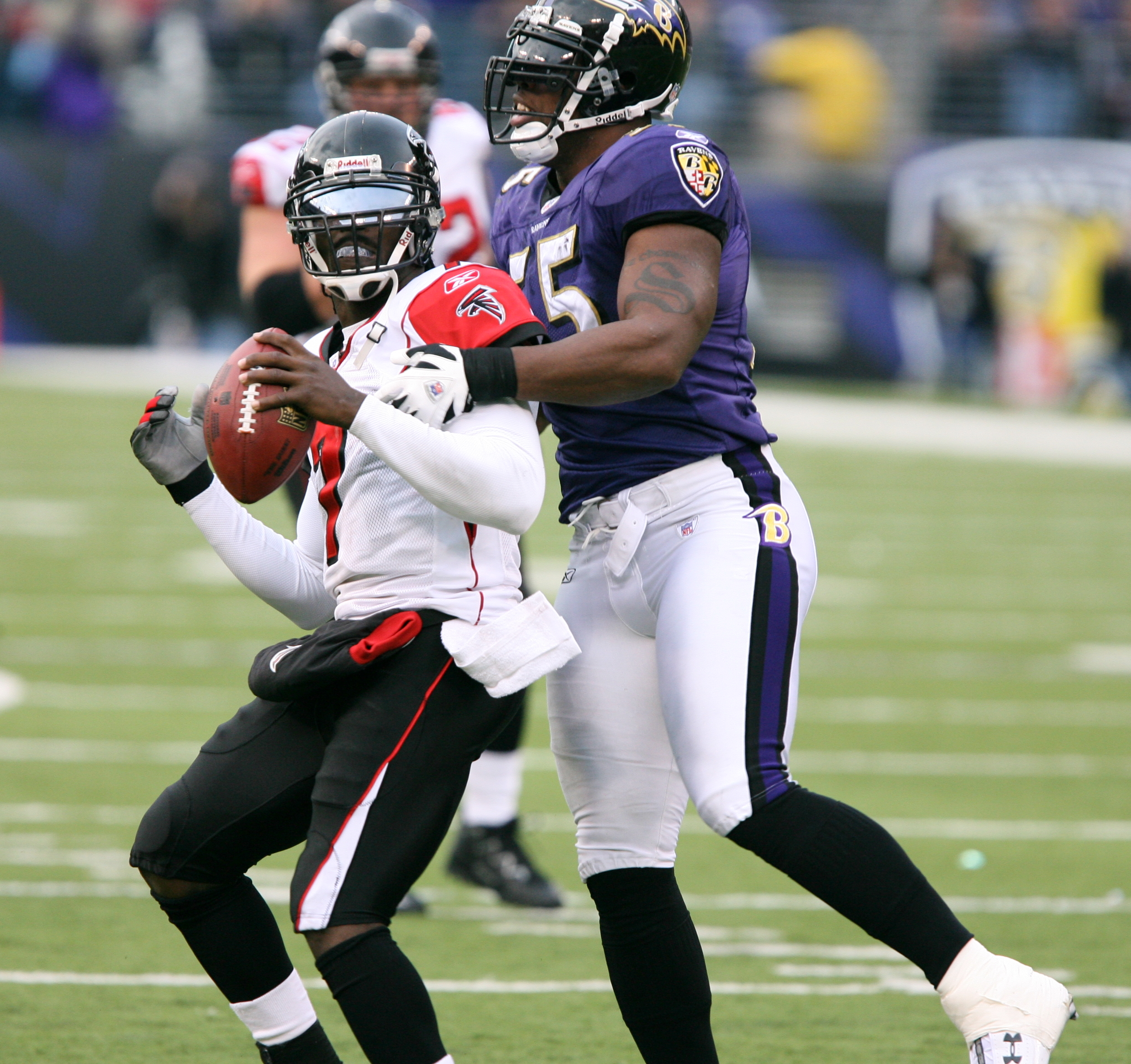
Suggs (right) and Michael Vick of the Atlanta Falcons in 2006.

On February 19, 2008, the Ravens placed the franchise tag on Suggs. He initially filed a grievance because the team had designated him as a LB with the franchise tag rather than a DE, which resulted in a monetary difference of about $800,000. Despite being unhappy with the franchise tag, Suggs reported to off-season mini-camps to practice with the team. On May 13, 2008, he reached an agreement with the team to split the difference in the franchise tag amounts of a LB and a DE and drop his grievance.

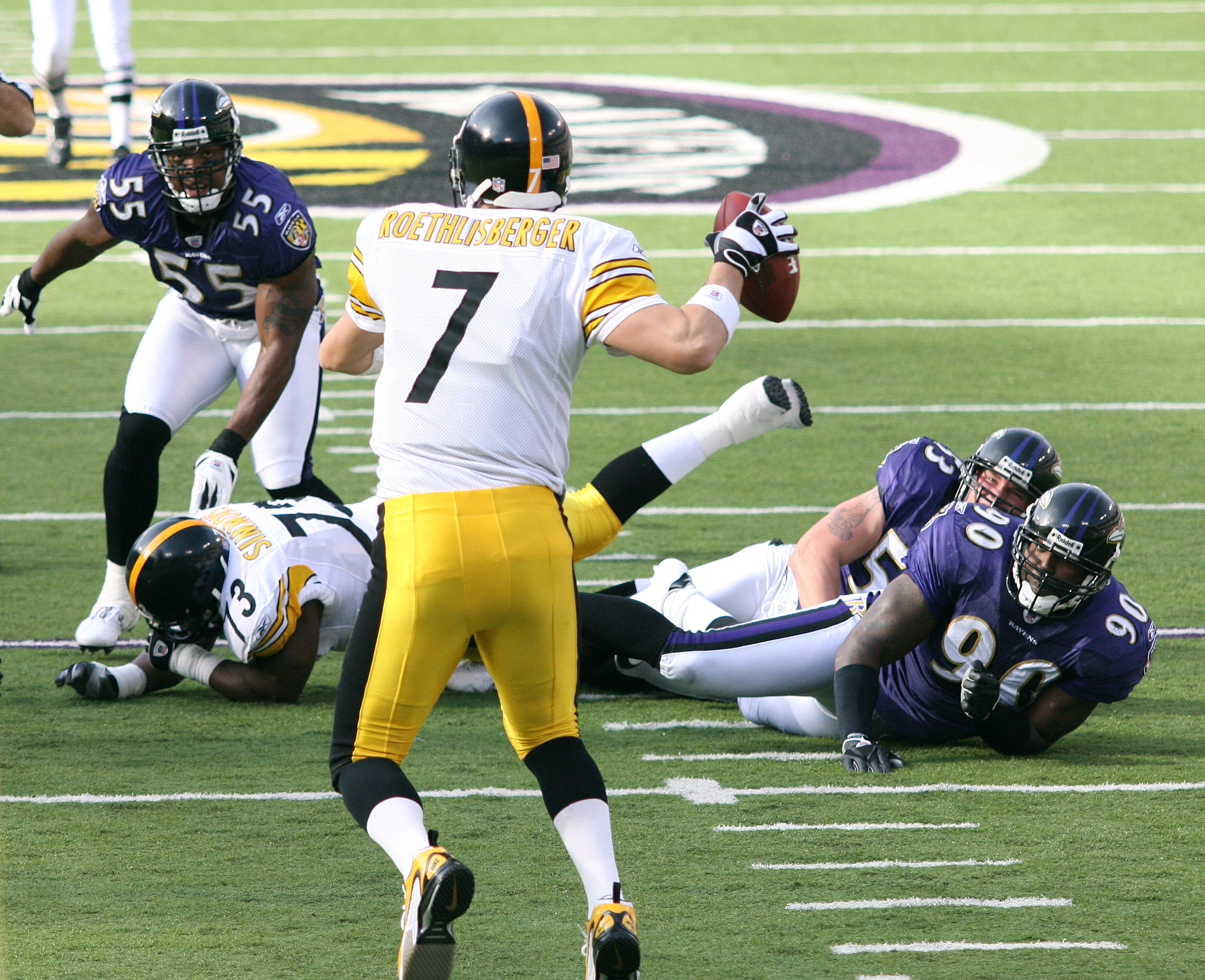
Suggs (55) pressures Ben Roethlisberger in 2006. Trevor Pryce is #90.

In Week 7 of the 2008 NFL season, Suggs intercepted a pass from Chad Pennington of the Miami Dolphins and returned it 44 yards for a touchdown, the first pick six of his professional career. He earned AFC Defensive Player of the Week for his game against Miami. Two weeks later, he intercepted Derek Anderson of the Cleveland Browns for a game-sealing touchdown. At season's end, he was named to his third Pro Bowl after producing 68 tackles (53 solo), two forced fumbles and eight sacks to go along with the two interceptions, a new career-high nine pass break-ups and two touchdowns. During the 2008–09 NFL playoffs, Suggs recorded sacks in all three of the Ravens' post-season games, including two in the AFC Championship against Ben Roethlisberger and the division-winning Pittsburgh Steelers.

On February 18, 2009, he was once again given the Ravens' franchise tag. On July 15, 2009, the Ravens signed him to a 6-year, $62.5 million contract. His bonus money ($33.1 million) made him the highest paid linebacker in NFL history.

==== 2009 ====
The 2009 season was not as productive for Suggs as he recorded a career-low in sacks with 4.5. Playing above his normal playing weight, he also missed the first three games of his career due to injury after quarterback Brady Quinn dove at his legs after cornerback Chris Carr intercepted a pass. In the Wild Card Round against the New England Patriots, Suggs sacked and forced a Tom Brady fumble before recovering the ball on the Patriots' opening drive, helping the Ravens ultimately win 33–14.

==== 2010 ====
In 2010, Suggs compiled 68 tackles (53 solo), 11.5 sacks, two forced fumbles and two pass deflections. In the playoff win over the Kansas City Chiefs in the Wild Card Round, he made four tackles (all solo) and two sacks. Against the Pittsburgh Steelers in the Divisional Round, he recorded six tackles (five solo), a career-high three sacks, and a forced fumble that was recovered and returned for a touchdown by fellow defensive end Cory Redding, but the Ravens would go on to lose 24–31 after squandering a 21–7 halftime lead. He earned a fourth Pro Bowl nomination. He was ranked 40th by his fellow players on the NFL Top 100 Players of 2011.

==== 2011: Defensive Player of the Year ====
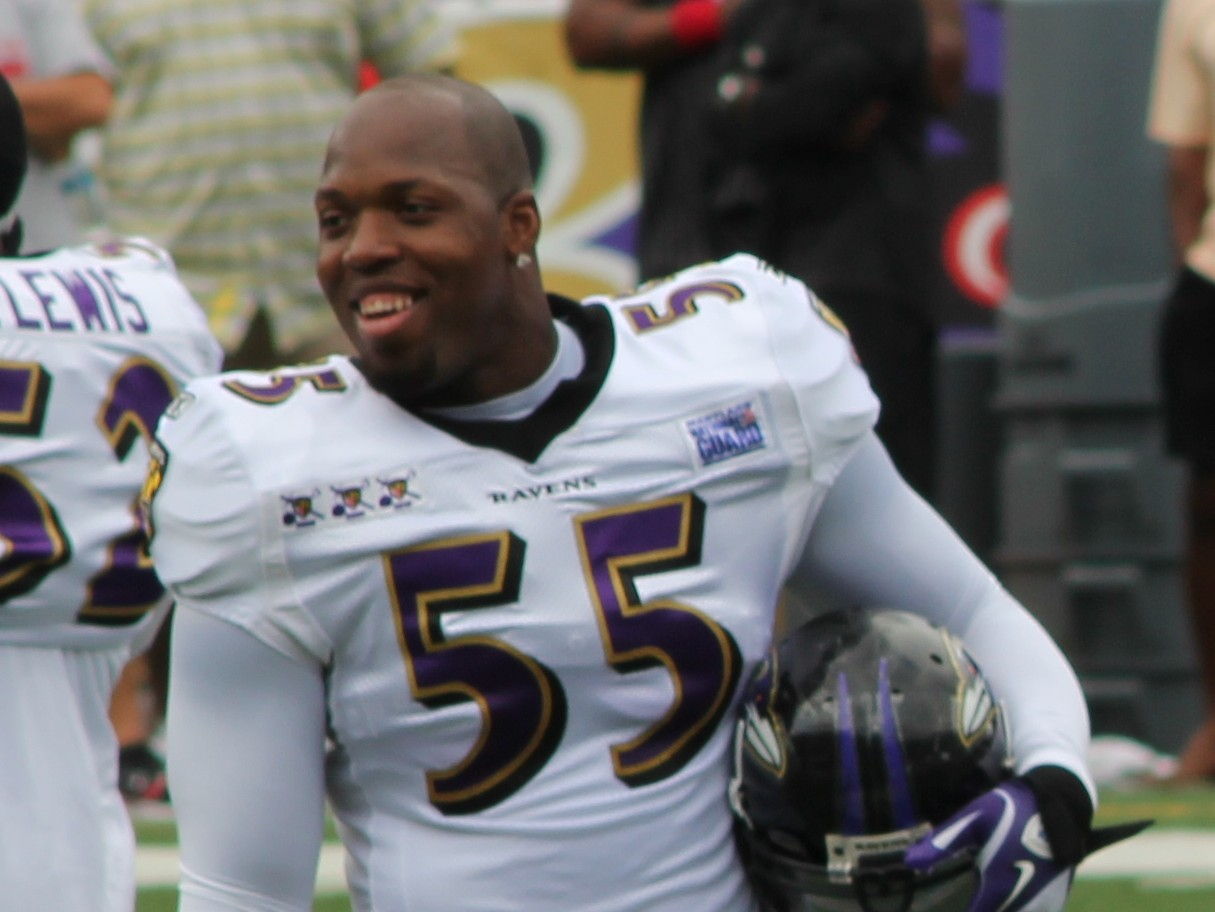
Suggs in 2011

2011 saw Suggs have the best season of his career, which started with a Defensive Player of the Week-winning performance against the Steelers. In a 35–7 blowout, Suggs recorded three sacks and two forced fumbles, contributing heavily to the defense's seven turnovers.

Suggs had two more games that season with three sacks, the second on Thanksgiving in a 16–6 win over the NFC's number-two-seeded San Francisco 49ers and the third in a 24–10 win over the Indianapolis Colts. He earned AFC Defensive Player of the Week honors for both performances. He finished the season with career highs in sacks (14) and forced fumbles (7), tied his career high for interceptions (2), and also had 50 total tackles and six passes defended. He was named to his fifth Pro Bowl and first All-Pro first team.

The Ravens entered the playoffs with a 12–4 record and the number-two seed in the AFC. They had their season ended by the New England Patriots in the AFC Championship after a dropped touchdown by Lee Evans and a notorious missed field goal by Billy Cundiff. On February 4, 2012, Suggs was named the NFL's Defensive Player of the Year. He was ranked 11th by his fellow players on the NFL Top 100 Players of 2012.

==== 2012: Super Bowl XLVII run ====
During the 2012 offseason, Suggs tore his Achilles tendon allegedly while playing basketball; though Suggs and his agent have claimed that he was hurt while doing conditioning workouts. Owner Steve Bisciotti stated that it was no concern where he hurt it and the Ravens will not try to avoid paying him his contract. Some medical experts believed that Suggs' injury should have forced him to miss the 2012 season, however Suggs claimed he would return by November 2012. On October 20, 2012, Suggs was removed from the physically unable to perform (PUP) list, allowing him to play the next day against the Houston Texans. Suggs has been the first player in NFL history to recover so quickly from such a serious injury. Suggs' return surprised many, as he finished the game with four tackles (three solo), one pass defended, and one sack, less than five and a half months after having Achilles tendon surgery. He finished the 2012 season with 22 total tackles, two sacks, and four passes defensed in eight games.

Suggs was key in the Ravens win over the Denver Broncos in the Divisional Round of the playoffs with two sacks on Broncos quarterback Peyton Manning, after which, the Ravens advanced to New England in a rematch of the previous year's AFC Championship Game where they defeated the New England Patriots by a score of 28–13. The win gave Suggs his first ever AFC Championship and his first appearance in the Super Bowl, being Super Bowl XLVII against the San Francisco 49ers. In that game, the Ravens won 34–31, earning Suggs his first Super Bowl ring. He was ranked 56th by his fellow players on the NFL Top 100 Players of 2013.

==== 2013 ====
In the 2013 season, Suggs started all 16 games with 80 tackles, a fumble recovery, and ten sacks. Suggs was elected to participate in the Pro Bowl for his sixth such nomination. He was ranked 26th by his fellow players on the NFL Top 100 Players of 2014.

==== 2014 ====
In Weeks 6–8, Suggs had one sack in each game. In Week 7, the sack he recorded on Falcons quarterback Matt Ryan was for a safety, and he recovered a fumble.

From Weeks 10–17, Suggs recorded at least one sack in each game, with the one exception being the Week 16 loss to the Houston Texans. In Week 10, Suggs had 1.5 sacks on Titans rookie quarterback Zach Mettenberger. Two weeks later, in a Monday Night Football matchup against the New Orleans Saints, Suggs accounted for a sack against Saints quarterback Drew Brees. With the hit, Suggs became the 31st player in NFL history to register over 100 sacks, and the first member of the Baltimore Ravens to achieve such a milestone.

In the Ravens' season finale, Suggs recorded a sack, a defended pass and a fumble recovery, all on Browns first-time-starting quarterback Connor Shaw. The Ravens clinched a Wild Card spot in the playoffs that day. Suggs finished the year with 12 sacks, a pass defended, a fumble recovery, and a safety. He and Elvis Dumervil led the league in sacks by a pair with 29.

In the Wild Card Round of the playoffs, Suggs intercepted a pass from Ben Roethlisberger in the fourth quarter. The ball bounced off the hands of running back Ben Tate, the intended receiver on the play, and landed between a diving Suggs's legs. The Ravens won this game 30–17 and moved onto the Divisional Round against the New England Patriots, where they lost to the eventual Super Bowl champions. He was ranked 84th by his fellow players on the NFL Top 100 Players of 2015.

==== 2015 ====
In the regular season opener against the Denver Broncos on September 13, 2015, Suggs suffered an achilles injury and left the game. Hours later, an MRI revealed that his achilles was torn, which prematurely ended his 2015 season.

==== 2016 ====
In the 2016 season, Suggs appeared in 15 games. He recorded 8.0 sacks, 28 tackles, seven assisted tackles, four passes defended, and three forced fumbles. He led the team in sacks, forced fumbles, tackles-for-loss, and quarterback hits.

==== 2017 ====
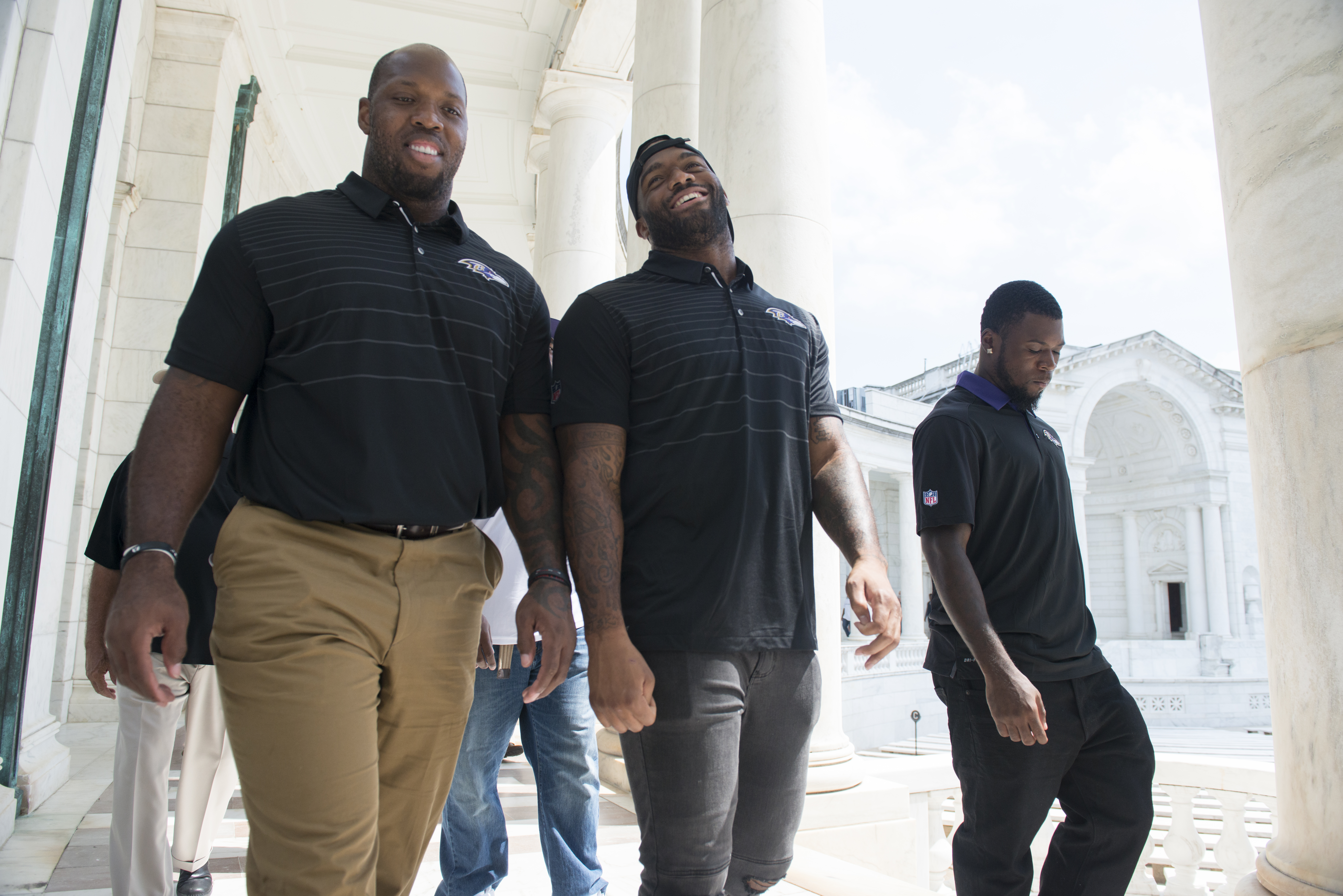
Suggs and other Ravens players in 2017

In the 2017 season opener against the Cincinnati Bengals, Suggs recorded two sacks and forced a fumble off of quarterback Andy Dalton in the third quarter of the 20–0 victory. The fumble, which was recovered by teammate Michael Pierce, occurred in the Ravens' red zone and helped preserve the eventual shutout victory. In Week 2, against the Cleveland Browns, he forced a fumble off DeShone Kizer, which helped set up the Ravens' offense on an eventual touchdown scoring drive in the 24–10 victory. In Weeks 11 and 12, he had two sacks in each game, helping the Ravens win back-to-back times against the Green Bay Packers and Houston Texans. On December 19, 2017, Suggs was named to his seventh Pro Bowl.

The Ravens finished the season with a 9–7 record, but missed the playoffs due to blowing the lead in the last fifty seconds of the fourth quarter in their season finale against the Bengals.

==== 2018 ====
In 2018, Suggs finished tied for second on the team with seven sacks, along with 34 combined tackles, six passes defended, a forced fumble, and a fumble recovery he returned for a touchdown in Week 12 against the Oakland Raiders.

=== Arizona Cardinals ===
On March 13, 2019, Suggs signed a one-year, $7 million deal with the Arizona Cardinals. Suggs made his debut with the Cardinals in Week 1 against the Detroit Lions. In the game, Suggs sacked Matthew Stafford twice in the 27–27 tie. Week 2 of the 2019 season saw Suggs go to Baltimore for the first time in an opposing team's jersey. As Suggs ran onto the field he received a standing ovation from Ravens fans. He had one solo tackle during the Cardinals' 23–17 loss. Also, in Week 4 against the Seattle Seahawks, Suggs sacked Russell Wilson 1.5 times in the 27–10 loss.

On December 13, 2019, Suggs was released by the Cardinals. He had registered 5.5 sacks and 4 forced fumbles during his time with the team. However, his playing time was reduced during his last two games with Arizona, where he did not register a single tackle. Cardinals head coach Kliff Kingsbury said the team wanted to go with the younger players, and said the decision to release Suggs was a mutual agreement.

=== Kansas City Chiefs ===
After his release from the Cardinals, Suggs was eligible to be claimed on waivers. Initial reports stated that Suggs only wanted to be claimed by the Ravens and would not report to any other team. However, on December 16, 2019, Suggs was claimed by the Kansas City Chiefs. Suggs was enticed to sign with the team after speaking with head coach Andy Reid, and was excited at the prospect of playing with reigning MVP Patrick Mahomes.

Suggs moved to the defensive end position in the Chiefs' 4–3 defense. He won the second Super Bowl of his career in Super Bowl LIV when the Chiefs beat the San Francisco 49ers 31–20 in a fourth-quarter comeback. He had two total tackles and a quarterback hit in the Super Bowl.

== NFL career statistics ==
Legend
	NFL record
	NFL Defensive Player of the Year
	Won the Super Bowl
	Led the league
**Bold**	Career high

=== Regular season ===
Year	Team	Games		Tackles					Fumbles				Interceptions					
Year	Team	GP	GS	Cmb	Solo	Ast	Sck	TFL	FF	FR	Yds	TD	Int	Yds	Avg	Lng	TD	PD
2003	BAL	16	1	27	19	8	12.0	9	6	**4**	7	0	1	11	11.0	11	0	3
2004	BAL	16	16	60	45	15	10.5	17	1	2	24	0	0	0	0.0	0	0	1
2005	BAL	16	16	69	46	23	8.0	6	4	1	0	0	**2**	38	19.0	38	0	4
2006	BAL	16	15	65	47	18	9.5	15	3	2	0	0	0	0	0.0	0	0	8
2007	BAL	16	16	**80**	52	28	5.0	13	1	0	0	0	0	0	0.0	0	0	6
2008	BAL	16	16	68	**53**	15	8.0	19	2	1	0	0	**2**	**86**	**43.0**	**44**	**2**	**9**
2009	BAL	13	13	59	44	15	4.5	9	1	1	0	0	0	0	0.0	0	0	5
2010	BAL	16	16	68	**53**	15	11.0	18	2	0	0	0	0	0	0.0	0	0	2
2011	BAL	16	16	70	50	20	**14.0**	**20**	**7**	0	0	0	**2**	9	4.5	9	0	6
2012	BAL	8	8	22	17	5	2.0	3	0	0	0	0	0	0	0.0	0	0	0
2013	BAL	16	16	**80**	47	**33**	10.0	13	0	1	0	0	0	0	0.0	0	0	0
2014	BAL	16	16	61	36	25	12.0	16	0	1	0	0	0	0	0.0	0	0	1
2015	BAL	1	1	0	0	0	0.0	0	0	0	0	0	0	0	0.0	0	0	0
2016	BAL	15	15	35	28	7	8.0	11	3	0	0	0	0	0	0.0	0	0	4
2017	BAL	16	16	49	37	12	11.0	11	4	0	0	0	0	0	0.0	0	0	4
2018	BAL	16	16	34	25	9	7.0	13	1	1	**43**	**1**	0	0	0.0	0	0	6
2019	AZ	13	13	37	23	14	5.5	8	4	1	0	0	0	0	0.0	0	0	0
2019	KC	2	0	3	1	2	1.0	1	0	0	0	0	0	0	0.0	0	0	0
Career		244	226	886	622	264	139	202	39	15	74	1	7	144	20.6	44	2	63

=== Postseason ===
Year	Team	Games		Tackles					Fumbles				Interceptions					
Year	Team	GP	GS	Cmb	Solo	Ast	Sck	TFL	FF	FR	Yds	TD	Int	Yds	Avg	Lng	TD	PD
2003	BAL	1	1	1	0	1	0.0	0	0	0	0	0	0	0	0.0	0	0	0
2006	BAL	1	1	7	5	2	0.0	1	**1**	0	0	0	0	0	0.0	0	0	0
2008	BAL	3	3	11	10	1	4.0	**4**	0	**1**	0	0	0	0	0.0	0	0	0
2009	BAL	2	2	6	4	2	1.0	1	**1**	**1**	0	0	0	0	0.0	0	0	0
2010	BAL	2	2	10	9	1	**5.0**	**4**	**1**	0	0	0	0	0	0.0	0	0	0
2011	BAL	2	2	11	7	4	0.0	0	0	0	0	0	0	0	0.0	0	0	**1**
2012	BAL	4	4	**21**	**13**	**8**	2.0	1	**1**	0	0	0	0	0	0.0	0	0	**1**
2014	BAL	2	2	8	3	5	0.5	1	0	0	0	0	**1**	**3**	**3.0**	**3**	0	**1**
2018	BAL	1	1	1	1	0	0.0	0	0	0	0	0	0	0	0.0	0	0	0
2019	KC	3	0	4	0	4	0.0	0	0	0	0	0	0	0	0.0	0	0	**1**
Career		21	18	80	52	28	12.5	12	4	2	0	0	1	3	3.0	3	0	4

== Career highlights ==
=== Awards and honors ===
NFL

- 2× Super Bowl champion (XLVII, LIV)
- NFL Defensive Player of the Year (2011)
- NFL Defensive Rookie of the Year (2003)
- First-team All-Pro (2011)
- Second-team All-Pro (2008)
- 7× Pro Bowl (2004, 2006, 2008, 2010, 2011, 2013, 2017)
- NFL forced fumbles leader (2011)
- Butkus Award (pro) (2011)
- PFWA All-Rookie Team (2003)
- 100 sacks club
- Baltimore Ravens Ring of Honor
- 5× NFL Top 100 — 40th (2011), 11th (2012), 56th (2013), 26th (2014), 84th (2015)

College

- Ted Hendricks Award (2002)
- Lombardi Award (2002)
- Bronko Nagurski Trophy (2002)
- Bill Willis Trophy (2002)
- Morris Trophy (2002)
- Unanimous All-American (2002)
- Pac-10 Defensive Player of the Year (2002)
- 2× First-team All-Pac-10 (2001, 2002)
- Pac-10 Freshman of the Year (2000)

=== Records ===
NFL records

- Most career tackles for loss: 202

Ravens franchise records

- Most career sacks (132.5)
- Most career forced fumbles (35)

== Personal life ==
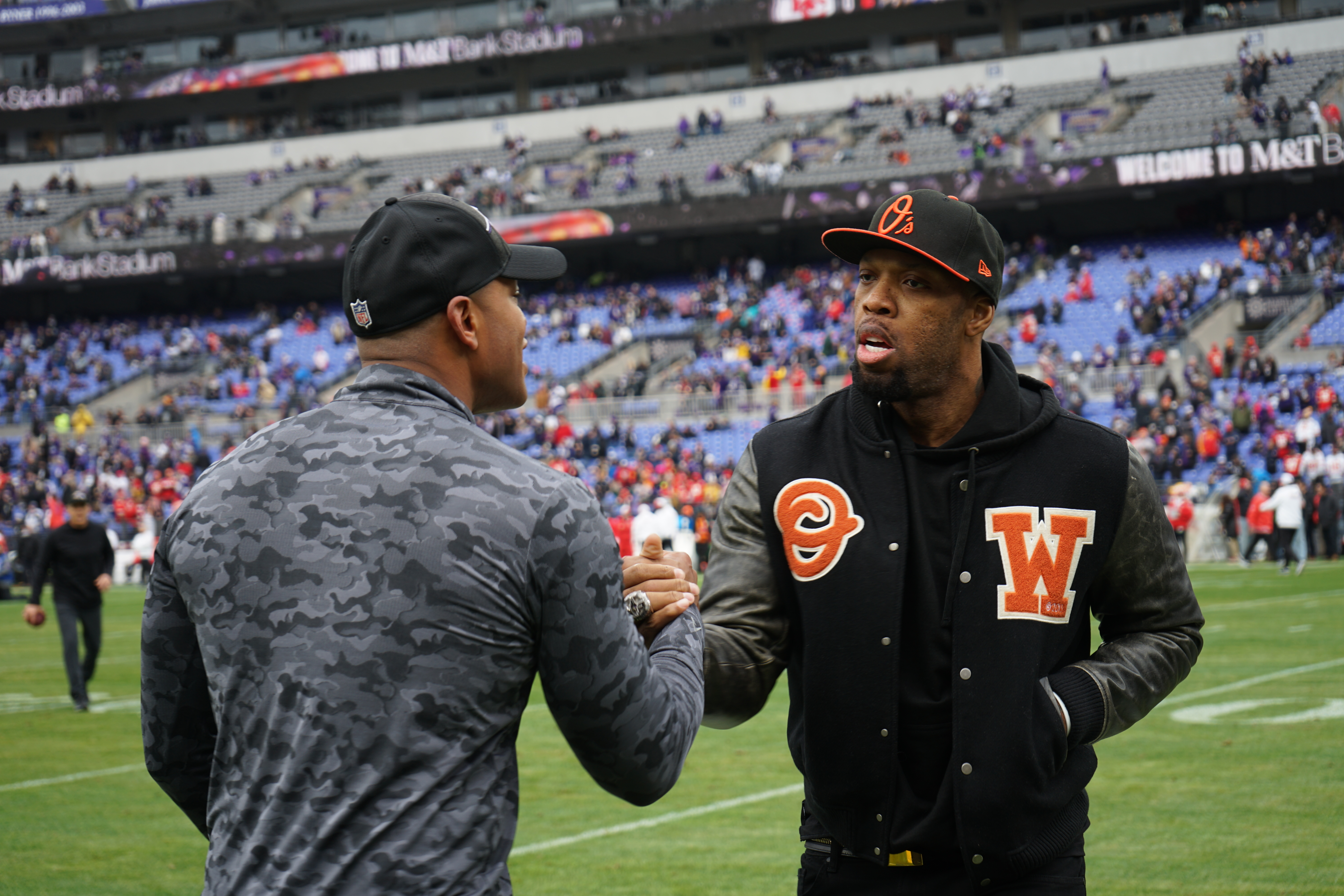
Wes Moore and Suggs in 2024

Suggs guest starred as himself in eight episodes of the series Ballers.

Suggs has Jewish ancestry through his paternal grandfather. He has had a Jewish star tattooed on his right arm since 2009, which he says he got "to remind me of who I am," and wears a Star of David necklace. Suggs wore a Star of David on his cleats during a game in October 2019 to commemorate the one-year anniversary of the deadly Tree of Life – Or L'Simcha Synagogue shooting in Pittsburgh.

Despite Suggs' rocky relationship with his former girlfriend, Candace Williams, the two married on December 14, 2012, and the protective order against Suggs was removed. The couple have two children together. Williams filed for divorce in 2015.

Suggs is the second cousin of Larry Suggs, the father of NBA player Jalen Suggs.

=== Legal issues ===
In December 2003, Suggs was charged with felony aggravated assault stemming from a March 2003 incident in Arizona, in which it was alleged that a verbal altercation after a basketball tournament led to Suggs assaulting a man with a piece of reinforcement rod. Apparently the parties had a disagreement during the tournament, and it was claimed that Suggs swung at the victim and broke his nose and cheekbone. In June 2005, however, Suggs was acquitted of the charges, with a juror commenting that guilt beyond a reasonable doubt was not established.

A series of allegations were made by his girlfriend, Candace Williams; in 2009 she alleged he threw a soap dispenser at her head, struck her in the chest with his hand and held a bottle of bleach over her and their 1-year-old son. No criminal charges were filed against Suggs, however, and Williams' subsequent lawsuit was dismissed. In September 2012, he was accused of punching and dragging Williams beside his car while his two children were inside. A temporary protective order was placed against Suggs, who was required to surrender his seven firearms, which included an AK-47. A judge dismissed the order on December 12. After marrying Williams in 2012, the protective order against Suggs was removed.

On April 10, 2024, Suggs was arrested in Scottsdale, Arizona, on charges of threatening and intimidating, as well as disorderly conduct with a weapon. The arrest stemmed from a March 10 incident in which Suggs made contact with another vehicle in a Starbucks drive–thru, and ensuing arguments led to Suggs threatening to kill the other vehicle's driver and brandishing a handgun in his left hand. In November 2024 it was reported that the trial wouldn't be held until 2025 amid indications that plea negotiations were ongoing. In February 2025, Suggs entered into a plea agreement that calls for him to perform 100 hours of community service, spend time on supervised probation, and complete anger management counseling.
