= Haloti Ngata =

American football player (born 1984)

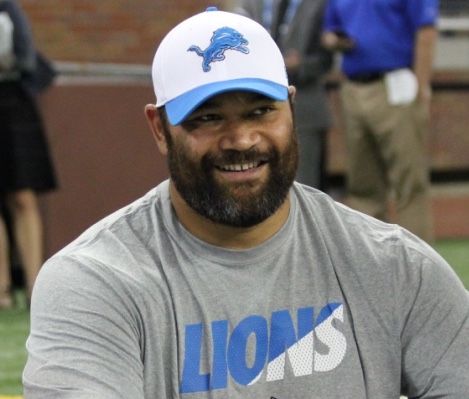
- Ngata in 2015

No. 92, 94
- Position: Defensive tackle

Personal information
- Born: January 21, 1984 (age 42); Inglewood, California, U.S.
- Listed height: 6 ft 4 in (1.93 m)
- Listed weight: 340 lb (154 kg)

Career information
- High school: Highland (Salt Lake City, Utah)
- College: Oregon (2002–2005)
- NFL draft: 2006: 1st round, 12th overall pick

Career history
- Baltimore Ravens (2006–2014); Detroit Lions (2015–2017); Philadelphia Eagles (2018)

Awards and highlights
- Super Bowl champion (XLVII); 2× First-team All-Pro (2010, 2011); 3× Second-team All-Pro (2008, 2009, 2012); 5× Pro Bowl (2009–2013); PFWA All-Rookie Team (2006); Baltimore Ravens Ring of Honor; Consensus All-American (2005); Morris Trophy (2005); Pac-10 Co-Defensive Player of the Year (2005); First-team All-Pac-10 (2005); Second-team All-Pac-10 (2004)

Career NFL statistics
- Total tackles: 515
- Sacks: 32.5
- Forced fumbles: 7
- Fumble recoveries: 5
- Interceptions: 5
- Defensive touchdowns: 1
- Stats at Pro Football Reference
- College Football Hall of Fame

Etuini Haloti Ngata (Tongan pronunciation: [ˈŋata]; born January 21, 1984) is an American former professional football player who was a defensive tackle in the National Football League (NFL) for thirteen seasons. He played college football for the Oregon Ducks, earning consensus All-American honors. Ngata was selected by the Baltimore Ravens in the first round of the 2006 NFL draft, and was voted to the Pro Bowl five times. Ngata played for the Ravens for nine seasons before being traded to the Detroit Lions before the 2015 NFL season. Ngata was also a member of the Philadelphia Eagles for one season in 2018 before retiring. He was inducted into the College Football Hall of Fame in 2025.

== Early life ==
Ngata, of Tongan ancestry, was born in Inglewood, California. He attended Highland High School, where he played on the football team in Salt Lake City, Utah. He was a three-year starter on the defensive line. As a senior, he recorded over 200 tackles and led his team to the state quarterfinals, following a 12–2 record and a berth in the State Championship as a junior. Ngata was named the 2001 Utah Gatorade Player of the Year and a first-team USA Today All-USA selection. He played in the 2002 U.S. Army All-American Bowl.

Ngata was listed as a five-star recruit and the No. 2 overall prospect in the nation by Rivals.com. He chose Oregon over BYU, Nebraska, Texas A&M, and Washington.

Ngata also played rugby in high school, and helped lead the Highland Rugby Club to the National Rugby Championship. He was red carded in the championship match.

== College career ==
A devout member of the Church of Jesus Christ of Latter-Day Saints, Ngata said he felt most at home at Brigham Young University, but struggled to make his college decision. He eventually signed a national letter of intent to play for the Oregon Ducks football team of the University of Oregon. Ngata tore his anterior cruciate ligament (ACL) on a punt coverage play in 2003 and missed the rest of that season. But over the next two seasons, Ngata became one of the best players in college football. Ngata totaled 107 tackles, 17.5 tackles for a loss, and 6.5 sacks total in the 2004 and 2005 seasons. He was a second-team All-Pac-10 selection in 2004, a first-team All-Pac-10 selection in 2005. Following his junior season in 2005, he was recognized as the Pac-10 Defensive Player of the Year and a consensus first-team All-American, Oregon's first in 43 years. Ngata also earned praise as a dangerous special teams player, blocking seven kicks during his three-year career at Oregon.

He had a 495 lb (225 kg) bench press max, which ranks second all-time among Oregon Ducks football players, behind only Igor Olshansky's 505 lb (229 kg).

== Professional career ==
=== Pre-draft ===
Ngata decided to leave Oregon a year early because his mother, 'Ofa, was in the early stages of kidney dialysis. She died from her illness on January 13, 2006.

Pre-draft measurables
Height	Weight	Arm length	Hand span	40-yard dash	10-yard split	20-yard split	20-yard shuttle	Three-cone drill	Vertical jump	Broad jump	Bench press
6 ft 4 1/8 in (1.93 m)	338 lb (153 kg)	33 1/8 in (0.84 m)	9 7/8 in (0.25 m)	5.16 s	1.73 s	2.94 s	4.65 s	7.95 s	31.5 in (0.80 m)	9 ft 2 in (2.79 m)	37 reps
All values from NFL Combine

=== Baltimore Ravens ===
==== 2006–2007 ====
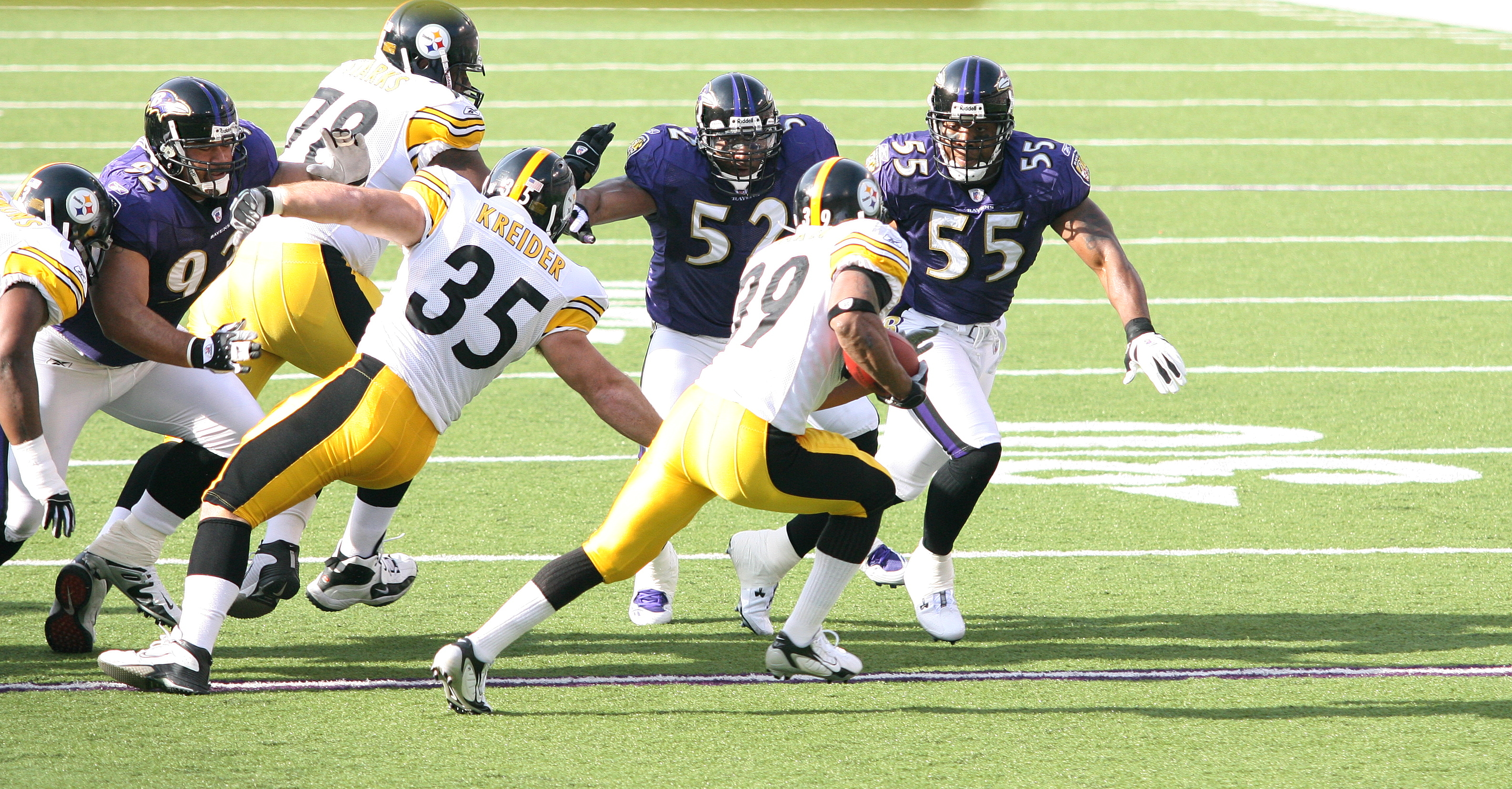
Ngata (far left), Ray Lewis, and Terrell Suggs chase down Pittsburgh Steelers running back Willie Parker in 2006.

Ngata was selected by the Baltimore Ravens in the first round with the 12th overall pick in the 2006 NFL draft. It was the first time in franchise history the Ravens used a first round pick on a defensive lineman. Ngata became the highest selected defensive lineman from the old Pac-12 conference since Andre Carter in 2001.

On July 28, 2006, Ngata ended a brief contract holdout by agreeing to a 5-year contract worth up to $14 million with the Baltimore Ravens. In his first game in Week 1 against the Tampa Bay Buccaneers, he returned an interception 60 yards to the Tampa Bay 9 yard-line which led to a field goal in a 27–0 win. In a Week 16 game against the Pittsburgh Steelers, he recorded his first career sack in the second quarter on a 3-yard sack of Ben Roethlisberger in a 31–7 win. In his rookie season, he started in all 16 games and finished the campaign with 31 tackles, one sack, and an interception. The following season, he made 63 tackles and three sacks.

==== 2008 ====
In the 2008 season, Ngata started all 16 regular season and three postseason games. He led the Ravens defensive line with 77 total tackles (43 solo, 34 assist), one sack, a career-high two interceptions, and five passes deflected as part of the NFL's #2 passing defense. He was named to the Pro Bowl as a first alternate and earned Second-team All-Pro honors by the Associated Press for the first time in his career.

==== 2009 ====
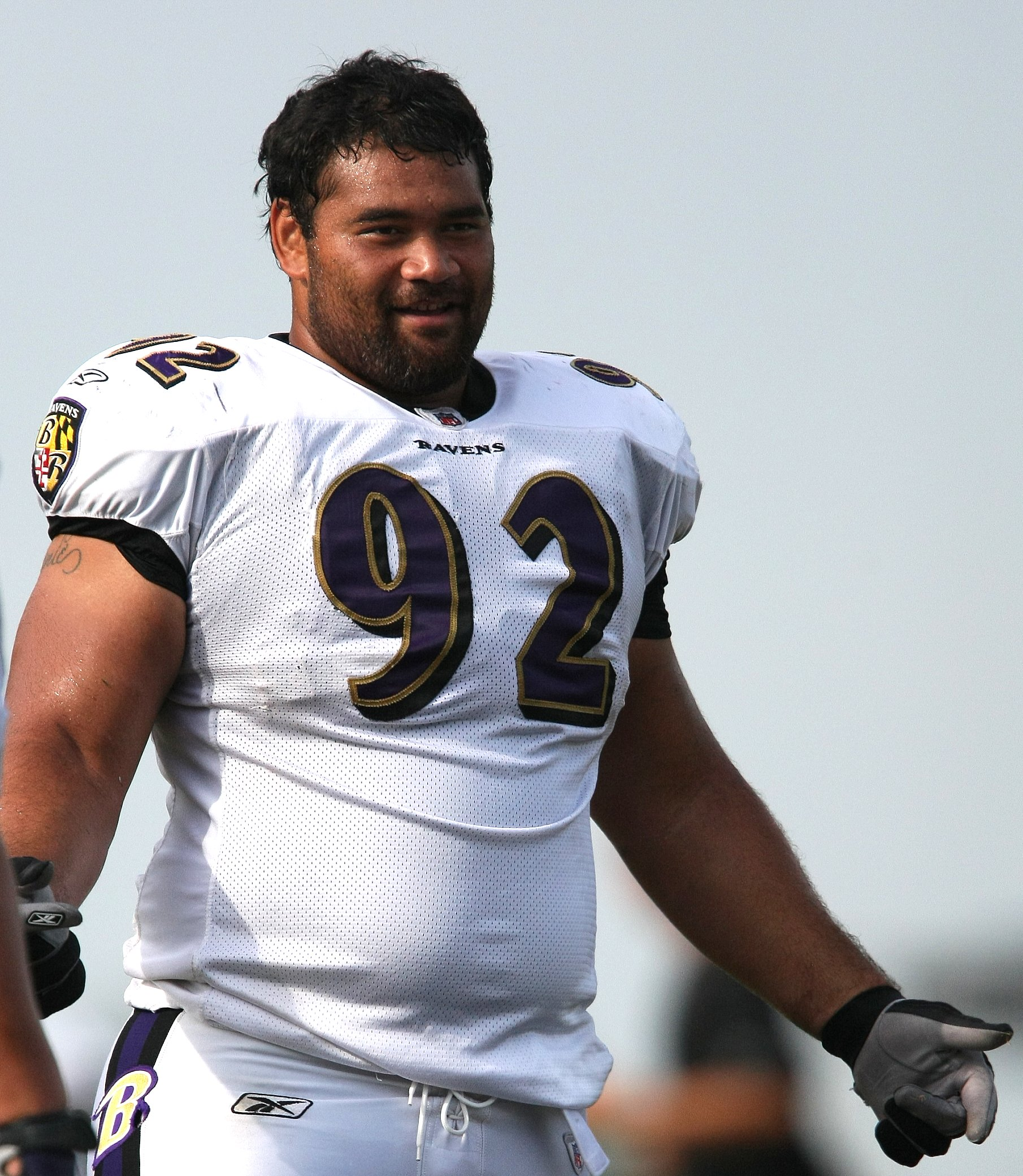
Ngata in 2009

During the 2009 season, Ngata started all 16 Ravens regular season and both post-season games. During the regular season, he recorded 36 tackles, of which 26 were unassisted and 1.5 sacks. He was selected for the first time in his career to play in the NFL Pro Bowl.

==== 2010 ====
After an outstanding 2010 season which included 63 tackles and 5.5 sacks, Ngata was selected to the 2010 All-Fundamentals Team by USA Football and the NFL Players Association. He was ranked 17th by his fellow players on the NFL Top 100 Players of 2011.

==== 2011 ====
On February 15, the Ravens placed their franchise tag on Ngata. On September 20, he was signed to a 5-year deal worth $61 million.

The Ravens opened the 2011 season at home against the Pittsburgh Steelers on September 11. In the game Ngata forced a fumble and tipped a pass that led to a Ray Lewis interception; the Ravens won 35–7. Two weeks later against the St. Louis Rams, Ray Lewis sacked Sam Bradford. Bradford fumbled, and the ball was recovered by Ngata who scored his first career regular season touchdown.

On October 2, 2011, during the Ravens game against the New York Jets, Ngata sacked Jets quarterback Mark Sanchez, causing Sanchez to fumble the ball. Ravens linebacker Jarrett Johnson picked up the fumble and returned it for a touchdown. The Ravens won the game by a score of 34–17. After reviewing the hit, the NFL levied a $15,000 fine against Ngata for roughing the passer even though no penalty was called by officials during the game.

Ngata finished the season with a career-high 64 tackles (36 unassisted), along with 5 sacks, 2 forced fumbles, and 5 passes defended. Ngata also earned his third straight Pro Bowl appearance. He was ranked ninth by his fellow players on the NFL Top 100 Players of 2012.

==== 2012 ====
During the 2012 season, Ngata played mostly defensive tackle and sometimes defensive end, collecting 5 sacks and 51 tackles overall. Ngata played in all four games of the Ravens 2012 postseason, recording 10 solo tackles and 3 assisted tackles as he helped the Ravens to victory in Super Bowl XLVII. A notable incident that occurred in this season happened in Week 14, when he hit Washington Redskins' rookie quarterback Robert Griffin III in his right knee, twisting it. Griffin would re-injure this knee later in the season, forcing him to undergo surgery. Ngata was ranked 42nd by his fellow players on the NFL Top 100 Players of 2013.

==== 2013 ====
In 2013, Ngata played mostly as a nose tackle making 33 tackles, 1.5 sacks, and 3 passes defended in 15 games played. He was ranked 45th by his fellow players on the NFL Top 100 Players of 2014.

==== 2014 ====
On August 29, 2014, Ngata was fined $8,268 for intentionally kicking Washington Redskins guard Shawn Lauvao during the final preseason game.

On December 4, 2014, Ngata was suspended for four games after he violated the NFL's policy on performance-enhancing substances. In 12 games, he finished with two sacks, 32 total tackles (19 solo), two interceptions, seven passes defended, and two forced fumbles. He was ranked 82nd by his fellow players on the NFL Top 100 Players of 2015.

During the offseason, the Ravens attempted to renegotiate Ngata's contract, as he carried an upcoming $16 million cap hit. However, Ngata refused to restructure his deal, raising the possibility of leaving the team that drafted him.

=== Detroit Lions ===
==== 2015 ====
On March 10, 2015, Ngata was traded to the Detroit Lions in exchange for a 2015 4th round pick (used to select Za'Darius Smith) and a 2015 5th round pick (used by the Arizona Cardinals to select Shaquille Riddick) to play defensive tackle. Ngata struggled in the first half of the season with an injury, but gained momentum and finished with 2.5 sacks and 24 tackles.

==== 2016 ====
On March 9, 2016, the Detroit Lions re-signed Ngata to a two-year, $12 million contract, with $6 million guaranteed. Ngata was hampered by a shoulder injury that limited his playing time. Overall, he played 13 games and finished the 2016 season with 22 tackles, 1.5 sacks, and three passes defended.

==== 2017 ====
On October 11, 2017, Ngata was placed on injured reserve after suffering a torn biceps in Week 5 against the Carolina Panthers. He started all five games before the injury and recorded seven tackles and a pass deflection.

=== Philadelphia Eagles ===
On March 15, 2018, Ngata signed a one-year contract with the Philadelphia Eagles. In his lone season with the Eagles he appeared in 13 games and had 17 tackles, including a sack.

=== Retirement ===
On March 18, 2019, Ngata announced his retirement from the NFL with an Instagram post of him atop of Mount Kilimanjaro with a banner "I'm retiring from the NFL on top". On May 28, 2019, the Ravens announced he will sign a one-day ceremonial contract with the team to retire as a Raven. At his retirement press conference, it was also announced that Ngata will be inducted into the Baltimore Ravens Ring of Honor. He was inducted on October 11, 2021.

== NFL career statistics ==
Legend
	Won the Super Bowl
**Bold**	Career high

=== Regular season ===
Year	Team	Games		Tackles					Fumbles				Interceptions					
Year	Team	GP	GS	Cmb	Solo	Ast	Sck	TFL	FF	FR	Yds	TD	Int	Yds	Avg	Lng	TD	PD
2006	BAL	**16**	**16**	31	13	18	1.0	2	0	0	0	0	1	**60**	**60.0**	**60**	0	2
2007	BAL	**16**	**16**	63	43	20	3.0	6	1	0	0	0	0	0	0.0	0	0	1
2008	BAL	**16**	**16**	55	43	12	1.0	6	0	0	0	0	**2**	8	4.0	7	0	6
2009	BAL	14	13	35	25	10	1.5	7	1	1	0	0	0	0	0.0	0	0	1
2010	BAL	**16**	15	63	**46**	17	**5.5**	**12**	0	1	0	0	0	0	0.0	0	0	5
2011	BAL	**16**	**16**	**64**	36	28	5.0	6	**2**	**3**	**28**	**1**	0	0	0.0	0	0	6
2012	BAL	14	14	51	33	18	5.0	7	0	0	0	0	0	0	0.0	0	0	1
2013	BAL	15	15	52	23	**29**	1.5	3	0	0	0	0	0	0	0.0	0	0	3
2014	BAL	12	12	31	19	12	2.0	2	**2**	0	0	0	**2**	16	8.0	13	0	**7**
2015	DET	14	14	24	15	9	2.5	6	0	0	0	0	0	0	0.0	0	0	3
2016	DET	13	13	22	11	11	1.5	0	0	0	0	0	0	0	0.0	0	0	3
2017	DET	5	5	7	7	0	0.0	2	0	0	0	0	0	0	0.0	0	0	1
2018	PHI	13	9	17	11	6	1.0	4	1	0	0	0	0	0	0.0	0	0	1
Career		180	174	515	325	190	32.5	83	7	5	28	1	5	84	16.8	60	0	40

=== Playoffs ===
Year	Team	Games		Tackles					Fumbles				Interceptions					
Year	Team	GP	GS	Cmb	Solo	Ast	Sck	TFL	FF	FR	Yds	TD	Int	Yds	Avg	Lng	TD	PD
2006	BAL	1	1	3	2	1	0.0	0	0	0	0	0	0	0	0	0	0	0
2008	BAL	3	3	12	**10**	2	**1.0**	**4**	0	0	0	0	0	0	0	0	0	0
2009	BAL	2	2	4	2	2	**1.0**	1	0	0	0	0	0	0	0	0	0	0
2010	BAL	2	2	4	3	1	0.5	0	0	0	0	0	0	0	0	0	0	**1**
2011	BAL	2	2	6	2	**4**	0.0	0	**1**	0	0	0	0	0	0	0	0	**1**
2012	BAL	**4**	**4**	**13**	**10**	3	0.0	0	0	0	0	0	0	0	0	0	0	**1**
2014	BAL	2	2	3	3	2	**1.0**	1	0	0	0	0	0	0	0	0	0	**1**
2016	DET	1	1	3	3	1	**1.0**	1	0	0	0	0	0	0	0	0	0	0
2018	PHI	2	1	2	2	1	0.0	0	0	0	0	0	0	0	0	0	0	0
Career		19	18	50	33	17	4.5	7	1	0	0	0	5	0	0.0	0	0	4

== Awards and honors ==
=== NFL ===
- Super Bowl champion (XLVII)
- 2× First-team All-Pro (2010, 2011)
- 3× Second-team All-Pro (2008, 2009, 2012)
- 5× Pro Bowl (2009–2013)
- PFWA All-Rookie Team (2006)
- 4× NFL Top 100 — 17th (2011), 9th (2012), 42nd (2013), 45th (2014)
- Baltimore Ravens Ring of Honor

=== College ===
- Consensus All-American (2005)
- First-team All-Pac-10 (2005)
- Second-team All-Pac-10 (2004)
- Pac-10 Co-Defensive Player of the Year (2005)
- Morris Trophy (2005)

== Personal life ==
Ngata was born in Inglewood, California, to Solomone Ngata and 'Ofa (née Moala), who had emigrated from Tonga to the United States in the early 1970s. He has two older brothers, Solomone Jr. and Finau, a younger brother, Vili, and a younger sister, Ame. Haloti Ngata was named after his maternal uncle, Haloti Moala-Liava'a, who was a middle linebacker for the Utah Utes (1984–1988). The family moved to Salt Lake City, Utah, in 1990. In December 2002, Ngata's father died in a single-vehicle truck accident, while trying to climb the on-ramp to Interstate 80 from Route 215 just outside Salt Lake City. His mother, having battled with chronic kidney disease/diabetic nephropathy for years, died in January 2006.

Ngata's extended family includes numerous athletes. One of his cousins, Tevita Moala, was a starting linebacker on Oregon State's 2000 Fiesta Bowl team. Another cousin, Fili Moala, was an All-American defensive lineman at Southern California (2004–2008), and subsequently played for the Indianapolis Colts. Ngata is also a distant relative of basketball player Jabari Parker and PGA Tour golfer Tony Finau.

Ngata resides in Park City, Utah with his wife Christina Ngata (née Adams) whom he married in June 2007. The couple has three sons: Solomon (born July 2009), named after his late grandfather; Haloti Maximus (born August 2012); and Colt (born January 2014).
