= 2007 Baltimore Ravens season =

NFL team season

- Owner: Steve Bisciotti
- General manager: Ozzie Newsome
- Head coach: Brian Billick
- Offensive coordinator: Rick Neuheisel
- Defensive coordinator: Rex Ryan
- Home stadium: M&T Bank Stadium

Results
- Record: 5–11
- Division place: 4th AFC North
- Playoffs: Did not qualify
- Pro Bowlers: RB Willis McGahee; T Jonathan Ogden; MLB Ray Lewis; FS Ed Reed

Uniform
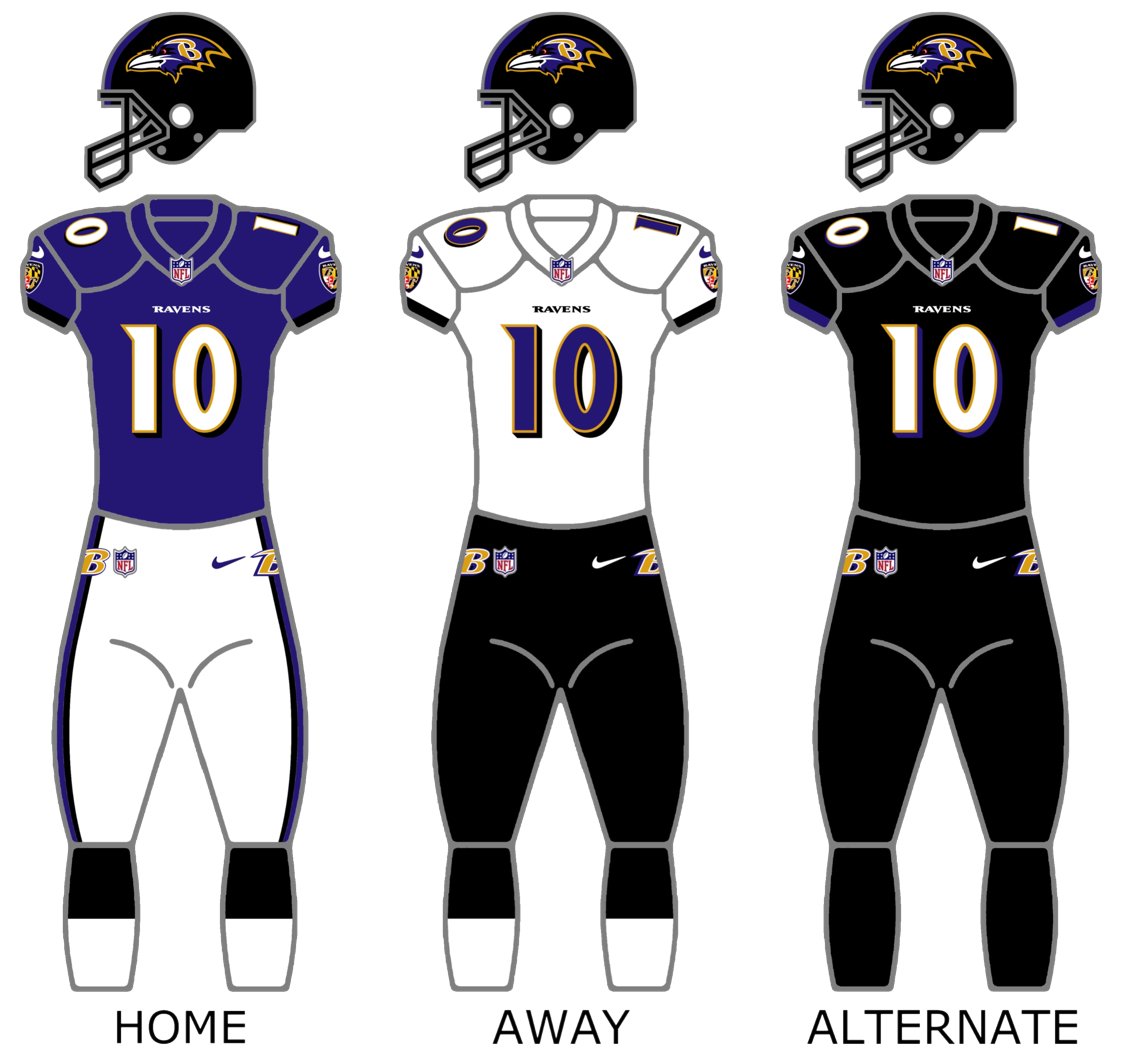

The 2007 season was the Baltimore Ravens' 12th in the National Football League (NFL), their 9th and final under head coach Brian Billick, and their 6th season under general manager Ozzie Newsome.

They entered the season hoping to improve on their 13–3 record from 2006, but failed to improve on that record. After a 4–2 start, the Ravens went on a franchise record 9-game losing streak. However, the Ravens defeated the Pittsburgh Steelers in week 17 and finished the season with a record of 5–11. They were eliminated from playoff contention with a loss to the undefeated New England Patriots in Week 13.

== Offseason ==
During the offseason the Ravens cut Jamal Lewis, with the intent of re-signing him at a lower salary. However, he then signed with the Cleveland Browns. The Ravens also choose not to place the franchise tag on Adalius Thomas, who then signed with the New England Patriots. Fullback Ovie Mughelli was also lost in free agency, signing with the Atlanta Falcons.

The Ravens then traded a 3rd and 7th round draft pick in the 2007 draft and a 3rd round pick in 2008 for Willis McGahee. In the 1st round of the draft, the Ravens selected Auburn offensive tackle Ben Grubbs. In the 5th round, the Baltimore Ravens drafted Ohio State quarterback Troy Smith.

=== NFL Draft ===
2007 Baltimore Ravens draft
Round	Pick	Player	Position	College	Notes
1	29	Ben Grubbs *	G	Auburn	
3	74	Yamon Figurs	WR	Kansas State	
3	86	Marshal Yanda *	OT	Iowa	
4	134	Antwan Barnes	LB	Florida International	
4	137	Le'Ron McClain *	FB	Alabama	
5	174	Troy Smith	QB	Ohio State	
6	207	Prescott Burgess	LB	Michigan	
Made roster † Pro Football Hall of Fame * Made at least one Pro Bowl during career

== Personnel ==
=== Staff / Coaches ===
Baltimore Ravens 2007 staff
Front office: Owner – Steve Bisciotti; Minority owner – Art Modell; President – Dick Cass; General manager/Executive Vice President – Ozzie Newsome; Vice president of football administration – Pat Moriarty; Director of pro personnel – George Kokinis; Assistant director of pro personnel – Vince Newsome; Director of college scouting – Eric DeCosta; Head coaches: Head coach – Brian Billick; Assistant Head coach/Offensive line – Chris Foerster; Special assistant to the Head coach - Vic Fangio; Offensive coaches: Offensive coordinator/Quarterbacks – Rick Neuheisel; Assistant quarterbacks - Jedd Fisch; Running backs – Tony Nathan; Wide receivers – Mike Johnson; Tight ends/Assistant offensive line – Wade Harman; Assistant offensive line – Greg Roman	Defensive coaches: Assistant head coach/defensive coordinator – Rex Ryan; Defensive line – Clarence Brooks; Linebackers – Jeff FitzGerald; Outside linebackers – Mike Pettine; Defensive backs – Mark Carrier; Secondary – Dennis Thurman; Special teams coaches: Special teams coordinator – Frank Gansz, Jr.; Assistant special teams – John Fassel; Strength and conditioning: Strength and conditioning – Jeff Friday; Assistant strength and conditioning – Paul Ricci

=== Final roster ===
2007 Baltimore Ravens roster
Quarterbacks (QB): 7 Kyle Boller; 8 Cullen Finnerty; 10 Troy Smith; Running backs (RB): 38 Mike Anderson; 33 Justin Green FB; 37 Le'Ron McClain FB; 23 Willis McGahee; 34 Cory Ross KR/PR; 32 Musa Smith; Wide receivers (WR): 89 Mark Clayton; 81 Devard Darling; 16 Yamon Figurs KR/PR; 85 Derrick Mason; 87 Demetrius Williams; 17 Matt Willis; Tight ends (TE): 82 Jake Nordin; 88 Quinn Sypniewski; 80 Lee Vickers; 83 Daniel Wilcox	Offensive linemen (OL): 60 Jason Brown G; 65 Chris Chester C/G; 62 Mike Flynn C; 71 Jared Gaither T; 66 Ben Grubbs G; 75 Jonathan Ogden T; 78 Adam Terry T; 73 Marshal Yanda T; Defensive linemen (DL): 94 Justin Bannan DE; 93 Dwan Edwards DE; 76 Amon Gordon NT; 97 Kelly Gregg NT; 92 Haloti Ngata DE; 72 J'Vonne Parker DE	Linebackers (LB): 50 Antwan Barnes OLB; 59 Nick Greisen ILB; 95 Jarret Johnson OLB; 91 Edgar Jones OLB; 52 Ray Lewis ILB; 58 Robert McCune ILB; 57 Bart Scott ILB; 56 Gary Stills OLB; 55 Terrell Suggs OLB; Defensive backs (DB): 44 Willie Gaston CB; 35 Corey Ivy CB; 26 Dawan Landry SS; 29 Derrick Martin CB/S; 24 David Pittman CB; 27 Ronnie Prude CB; 20 Ed Reed FS/PR; 28 Jamaine Winborne CB; Special teams (ST): 70 Matt Katula LS; 4 Sam Koch P; 3 Matt Stover K	Practice squad: 98 Zarnell Fitch DT; 74 Mike Kracalik T; 40 Jeff Shoate CB; Reserve: 54 Prescott Burgess LB (IR); 53 Dan Cody LB (PUP); 30 P. J. Daniels RB (IR); 86 Todd Heap TE (IR); 21 Chris McAlister CB (IR); 9 Steve McNair QB (IR); 90 Trevor Pryce DE (IR); 22 Samari Rolle CB (IR); 36 B. J. Sams RB (IR); 42 Gerome Sapp S (IR); 51 Mike Smith LB (IR); Rookies in italics 53 active, 11 reserve, 3 practice squad

== Schedule ==
=== Preseason ===
Week	Date	Opponent	Result	Record	Venue	Recap
1	August 13	Philadelphia Eagles	W 29–3	1–0	M&T Bank Stadium	Recap
2	August 19	New York Giants	L 12–13	1–1	M&T Bank Stadium	Recap
3	August 25	Washington Redskins	L 7–13	1–2	FedEx Field	Recap
4	August 31	Atlanta Falcons	L 10–13	1–3	Georgia Dome	Recap

=== Regular season ===
Week	Date	Opponent	Result	Record	Venue	Recap
1	September 10	at Cincinnati Bengals	L 20–27	0–1	Paul Brown Stadium	Recap
2	September 16	New York Jets	W 20–13	1–1	M&T Bank Stadium	Recap
3	September 23	Arizona Cardinals	W 26–23	2–1	M&T Bank Stadium	Recap
4	September 30	at Cleveland Browns	L 13–27	2–2	Cleveland Browns Stadium	Recap
5	October 7	at San Francisco 49ers	W 9–7	3–2	Monster Park	Recap
6	October 14	St. Louis Rams	W 22–3	4–2	M&T Bank Stadium	Recap
7	October 21	at Buffalo Bills	L 14–19	4–3	Ralph Wilson Stadium	Recap
8	Bye					
9	November 5	at Pittsburgh Steelers	L 7–38	4–4	Heinz Field	Recap
10	November 11	Cincinnati Bengals	L 7–21	4–5	M&T Bank Stadium	Recap
11	November 18	Cleveland Browns	L 30–33 (OT)	4–6	M&T Bank Stadium	Recap
12	November 25	at San Diego Chargers	L 14–32	4–7	Qualcomm Stadium	Recap
13	December 3	New England Patriots	L 24–27	4–8	M&T Bank Stadium	Recap
14	December 9	Indianapolis Colts	L 20–44	4–9	M&T Bank Stadium	Recap
15	December 16	at Miami Dolphins	L 16–22 (OT)	4–10	Dolphin Stadium	Recap
16	December 23	at Seattle Seahawks	L 6–27	4–11	Qwest Field	Recap
17	December 30	Pittsburgh Steelers	W 27–21	5–11	M&T Bank Stadium	Recap

== Game summaries ==
=== Week 1: at Cincinnati Bengals ===
Quarter	1	2	3	4	Total
Ravens	0	10	0	10	20
Bengals	9	3	7	8	27

at Paul Brown Stadium, Cincinnati

- Game time: 7:00 pm EDT
- Game weather: Mostly cloudy, 82 °F (28 °C)
- Game attendance: 66,093
- Referee: Terry McAulay
- TV announcers (ESPN): Mike Tirico, Tony Kornheiser, Ron Jaworski, Michele Tafoya & Suzy Kolber

Game information
First quarter
- CIN – Chad Johnson 39-yard pass from Carson Palmer (kick blocked), 8:38. Bengals 6–0.
- CIN – Shayne Graham 23-yard field goal, 4:07. Bengals 9–0.

Second quarter

- BAL – Musa Smith 6-yard run (Matt Stover kick), 11:56. Bengals 9–7.
- CIN – Shayne Graham 40-yard field goal, 1:07. Bengals 12–7.
- BAL – Matt Stover 36-yard field goal, 0:06. Bengals 12–10.

Third quarter

- CIN – Landon Johnson 34-yard fumble return (Shayne Graham kick), 8:57. Bengals 19–10.

Fourth quarter

- BAL – Matt Stover 23-yard field goal, 14:05. Bengals 19–13.
- BAL – Ed Reed 63-yard punt return (Matt Stover kick), 12:25. Ravens 20–19.
- CIN – T. J. Houshmandzadeh 7-yard pass from Carson Palmer (Rudi Johnson run), 8:53. Bengals 27–20.

The Ravens began their 2007 campaign on the road against their AFC North foe, the Cincinnati Bengals, in the first game of a Monday Night Football doubleheader. In the first quarter, Baltimore lost two fumbles early on, with the Bengals turning the second fumble into QB Carson Palmer’s 39-yard TD pass to WR Chad Johnson. Later, another Raven fumble allowed Cincinnati to cash in as Bengals kicker Shayne Graham nailed a 23-yard field goal. In the second quarter, Baltimore finally managed to get on the board as RB Musa Smith got a 6-yard TD run. Later, Cincinnati increased its advantage with Graham kicking a 40-yard field goal. The Ravens ended the half with kicker Matt Stover getting a 36-yard field goal.

In the third quarter, Baltimore's turnover problems continued as QB Steve McNair fumbled the ball as he got sacked, allowing Bengals LB Landon Johnson to return the fumble 34 yards for a touchdown for the only score of the period. In the fourth quarter, the Ravens finally took the lead with Stover kicking a 23-yard field goal and Safety Ed Reed returning a punt 63 yards for a touchdown. However, later in the period, a McNair pass was intercepted by DE Robert Geathers. The Bengals quickly cashed in as Palmer completed a 7-yard TD pass to WR T. J. Houshmandzadeh, followed by a 2-point conversion run by RB Rudi Johnson. With McNair having groin problems, QB Kyle Boller took over. He threw a pass in the red zone to tight end Todd Heap that was overturned for an offensive pass interference penalty – a call that drew anger from Ravens fans as replays showed that if anything, Heap had been interfered against. Near the end of the game, he almost helped the Ravens score, but a Michael Myers interception ended any hope of Baltimore's comeback. In the end, the Ravens ended up with six turnovers on the night.

With the loss, Baltimore began its season at 0–1 while the Bengals started out 1–0.

=== Week 2: vs. New York Jets ===
Quarter	1	2	3	4	Total
Jets	0	3	0	10	13
Ravens	7	10	0	3	20

at M&T Bank Stadium, Baltimore

- Game time: 4:15 pm EDT
- Game weather: Sunny, 69 °F (21 °C)
- Game attendance: 71,246
- Referee: Scott Green
- TV announcers (CBS): Dick Enberg (play-by-play) and Randy Cross (color commentator)

Hoping to rebound from their turnover-plagued loss to the Bengals, the Ravens flew home for their Week 2 home-opener against the New York Jets. With Steve McNair still recovering from a groin injury, QB Kyle Boller was given the start for this Back-Up Bowl (due to the fact Kellen Clemens was filling in for an injured Chad Pennington). In the first quarter, Baltimore took to the skies early with Boller completing a 2-yard TD pass to RB Willis McGahee for the only score of the period. In the second quarter, the Jets responded with kicker Mike Nugent getting a 50-yard field goal. The Ravens responded with kicker Matt Stover getting a 28-yard field goal and Boller completing a 4-yard TD pass to TE Todd Heap.

After a scoreless third quarter, Baltimore increased its lead with Stover kicking a 43-yard field goal. However, the Jets began to show some fight within them as Nugent kicked a 21-yard field goal, while Clemens completed a 3-yard TD pass to TE Chris Baker. The Ravens’ defense held its ground and LB Ray Lewis managed to get the game-winning interception.

With the win, not only did Baltimore improve to 1–1, but it made the Ravens 4–0 against the Jets while under Head Coach Brian Billick.

=== Week 3: vs. Arizona Cardinals ===
Quarter	1	2	3	4	Total
Cardinals	0	3	3	17	23
Ravens	3	17	3	3	26

- Game time: 1:00 pm. EST
- Game weather: Sunny, 75 °F (24 °C)
- Game attendance: 71,372
- Referee: Jerome Boger
- TV announcers (Fox): Thom Brennaman (play-by-play) and Tim Hasselbeck (color commentator)

After their win over the Jets, the Ravens stayed at home for a Week 3 interconference fight with the Arizona Cardinals. In the first quarter, Baltimore took flight first with kicker Matt Stover getting a 21-yard field goal for the only score of the period. In the second quarter, the Ravens increased its lead with Stover getting a 28-yard field goal. The Cardinals responded with kicker Neil Rackers getting a 48-yard field goal. Afterwards, Baltimore began to unload with QB Steve McNair completing a 13-yard TD pass to WR Derrick Mason, while rookie WR Yamon Figurs returned a punt 75 yards for a touchdown.

In the third quarter, Arizona managed to get a 40-yard field goal from Rackers, while the Ravens had Stover kick a 43-yard field goal. However, in the fourth quarter, the Cardinals started to work their way back into the game with QB Kurt Warner completing a 5-yard and a 32-yard TD pass to WR Anquan Boldin, along with Rackers getting a 41-yard field goal to tie the game. Stover helped Baltimore close out the game with a win as he nailed the game-winning 46-yard field goal as time expired.

With the win, the Ravens improved to 2–1.

=== Week 4: at Cleveland Browns ===
Quarter	1	2	3	4	Total
Ravens	0	6	0	7	13
Browns	14	10	3	0	27

- Game time: 1:00 pm. EST
- Game weather: 77 °F (25 °C)
- Game attendance: 73,024
- Referee: Ron Winter
- TV announcers (CBS): Kevin Harlan (play-by-play) & Rich Gannon (color commentator)

Coming off their last-second home win over the Cardinals, the Ravens flew to Cleveland Browns Stadium for an AFC North duel with the Cleveland Browns. The matchup was notable with former Ravens RB Jamal Lewis now playing for Cleveland. In the first quarter, Baltimore trailed early as the Browns took their opening drive and ended it with QB Derek Anderson (another former Raven) completing a 2-yard TD pass to WR Joe Jurevicius. Also, immediately after QB Steve McNair got intercepted, Cleveland cashed in with Anderson completing a 78-yard TD pass to WR Braylon Edwards. In the second quarter, Baltimore managed to get on the board with kicker Matt Stover getting a 21-yard field goal. However, the Browns continued their offensive surge with kicker Phil Dawson getting a 41-yard field goal, along with Lewis getting a 1-yard TD run. Even though instant replay showed that the ball was just shy of breaking the plane of the goal line, the Ravens’ coaching staff was unable to challenge the play in time. They ended the half with Stover kicking a 29-yard field goal.

In the third quarter, Cleveland continued its surge with Dawson kicking a 20-yard field goal for the only score of the period. In the fourth quarter, Baltimore tried to come back, but the only thing from their comeback was McNair's 4-yard TD pass to TE Quinn Sypniewski. With the surprising loss, the Ravens fell to 2–2, despite outgaining the Browns 418–303 in total offense. On the positive note, RB Willis McGahee got his first 100-yard game as a Raven, as he ran 14 times for 104 yards.

=== Week 5: at San Francisco 49ers ===
Quarter	1	2	3	4	Total
Ravens	0	6	3	0	9
49ers	0	0	7	0	7

- Game time: 4:15 pm. EST
- Game weather: Sunny, 63 °F (17 °C)
- Game attendance: 67,885
- Referee: Bill Leavy
- TV announcers (CBS): Ian Eagle (play-by-play) and Solomon Wilcots (color commentator)

Hoping to rebound from their divisional road loss to the Browns, the Ravens flew to Bill Walsh Field at Monster Park for an interconference duel with the San Francisco 49ers. Baltimore even went up against the QB that helped them win Super Bowl XXXV, Trent Dilfer, because QB Alex Smith was out with a separated shoulder.

After a scoreless first quarter, the Ravens got the first punch with kicker Matt Stover getting a 26-yard and a 32-yard field goal. In the third quarter, Stover gave Baltimore a 49-yard field goal. However, the 49ers threatened with Dilfer completing a 23-yard TD pass to WR Arnaz Battle. The 49ers’ kicker Joe Nedney missed the potential game-winning field goal from 52 yards out, and the Ravens held on for the lead.

With their win, Baltimore improved to 3–2.

=== Week 6: vs. St. Louis Rams ===
Quarter	1	2	3	4	Total
Rams	0	0	3	0	3
Ravens	3	10	3	6	22

at M&T Bank Stadium, Baltimore

- Game time: 1:02 pm EDT
- Game weather: Sunny, 68 °F (20 °C)
- Game attendance: 71,175
- Referee: Tony Corrente
- TV announcers (Fox): Sam Rosen (play-by-play) and Tim Ryan (color commentator)

Coming off of their road win over the 49ers, the Ravens went home for a Week 6 interconference duel with the winless St. Louis Rams. With QB Steve McNair out with injuries, back-up Kyle Boller was given the start.

In the first quarter, Baltimore took flight early with kicker Matt Stover getting a 43-yard field goal for the only score of the period. In the second quarter, the Raven continued to take advantage of an injury-plagued Rams team with Stover kicking a 42-yard field goal, along with RB Willis McGahee getting a 6-yard TD run. In the third quarter, Baltimore increased its lead with Stover nailing a 23-yard field goal. Afterwards, St. Louis got its only score of the game as kicker Jeff Wilkins got a 32-yard field goal. In the fourth quarter, the Ravens sealed their easy win with Stover kicking a 31-yard and a 36-yard field goal.

With the win, Baltimore improved to 4–2.

During the win, the Ravens defense forced six turnovers, which included a franchise-best 5 interceptions.

=== Week 7: at Buffalo Bills ===
Quarter	1	2	3	4	Total
Ravens	0	0	7	7	14
Bills	3	6	10	0	19

- Game time: 1:00 pm. EST
- Game weather: Sunny, 66 °F (19 °C)
- Game attendance: 70,727
- Referee: Terry McAulay
- TV announcers (CBS): Kevin Harlan (play-by-play) & Rich Gannon (color commentator)

Coming off their easy home win over the Rams, the Ravens flew to Ralph Wilson Stadium for a Week 7 duel with the Buffalo Bills. This game was notable for RB Willis McGahee, as he returned to Buffalo to play against his former team, who made their first-ever visit to Buffalo in their twelfth NFL season. With McNair still out with injuries, QB Kyle Boller was given the start.

In the first quarter, Baltimore trailed early as Bills kicker Rian Lindell got a 29-yard field goal for the only score of the period. In the second quarter, the Ravens continued to struggle as Lindell increased Buffalo's lead with 26-yard and a 35-yard field goal. In the third quarter, Baltimore got back into the game as McGahee ran 43 yards for a touchdown. However, the Bills responded with Lindell getting a 41-yard field goal, along with RB Marshawn Lynch getting a 1-yard TD run. In the fourth quarter, the Ravens got within striking range as Boller completed a 15-yard TD pass to WR Derrick Mason. Buffalo held on to get the win.

With the loss, Baltimore entered its bye week at 4–3.

=== Week 9: at Pittsburgh Steelers ===
Quarter	1	2	3	4	Total
Ravens	0	7	0	0	7
Steelers	14	21	3	0	38

at Heinz Field, Pittsburgh

- Game time: 8:30 pm EDT
- Game weather: Rainy, 52 °F (11 °C)
- Game attendance: 63,457
- Referee: Ed Hochuli
- TV announcers (ESPN): Mike Tirico, Tony Kornheiser, Ron Jaworski, Michele Tafoya & Suzy Kolber

Coming off their bye week, the Ravens flew to Heinz Field for a Monday Night divisional duel with the throwback-clad Pittsburgh Steelers. In the first quarter, Baltimore fell behind early as Steelers QB Ben Roethlisberger completed a 17-yard TD pass to TE Heath Miller and a 15-yard TD pass to WR Santonio Holmes. In the second quarter, the Ravens continued to struggle as Roethlisberger completed a 30-yard TD pass to WR Nate Washington, a 35-yard TD pass to Holmes, and 7-yard TD pass to Washington. Afterwards, Baltimore got its only score of the game as RB Willis McGahee got a 33-yard TD run. In the third quarter, Pittsburgh increased its lead with kicker Jeff Reed nailing a 22-yard field goal. Afterwards, the Steelers’ defense continued to shut down any hope of a comeback.

With the loss, the Ravens fell to 4–4.

The Ravens offense committed four turnovers and 11 penalties, and was held to a franchise-worst 104 total yards. QB Steve McNair had a dismal night, as he completed 13 out of 22 passes for only 63 yards and an interception.

=== Week 10: vs. Cincinnati Bengals ===
Quarter	1	2	3	4	Total
Bengals	0	6	3	12	21
Ravens	0	0	0	7	7

- Game time: 1:00 pm. EST
- Game weather: Clear, 50 °F (10 °C)
- Game attendance: 71,130
- Referee: Jerome Boger
- TV announcers (CBS): Dick Enberg (play-by-play) & Randy Cross (color commentator)

Trying to snap a two-game losing skid, the Ravens went home for an AFC North rematch with the Cincinnati Bengals. After a scoreless first quarter, Baltimore struggled as Cincinnati kicker Shayne Graham got a 34-yard and a 19-yard field goal. In the third quarter, the Ravens continued to fall behind as Graham gave the Bengals a 22-yard field goal. In the fourth quarter, Graham helped Cincinnati pull away as he nailed two 35-yarders, a 21-yarder, and a 33-yard field goal. Baltimore's only score of the game came with RB Willis McGahee getting a 1-yard TD run.

With their third-straight loss, the Ravens fell to 4–5.

During this season, Baltimore has committed a total of 12 turnovers in their series against the Bengals (6 from this game).

=== Week 11: vs. Cleveland Browns ===
Quarter	1	2	3	4	OT	Total
Browns	3	10	14	3	3	33
Ravens	0	7	7	16	0	30

- Game time: 1:00 pm. EST
- Game weather: Light rain, 53 °F (12 °C)
- Game attendance: 71,055
- Referee: Pete Morelli
- TV announcers (CBS): Ian Eagle (play-by-play) and Solomon Wilcots (color commentator)

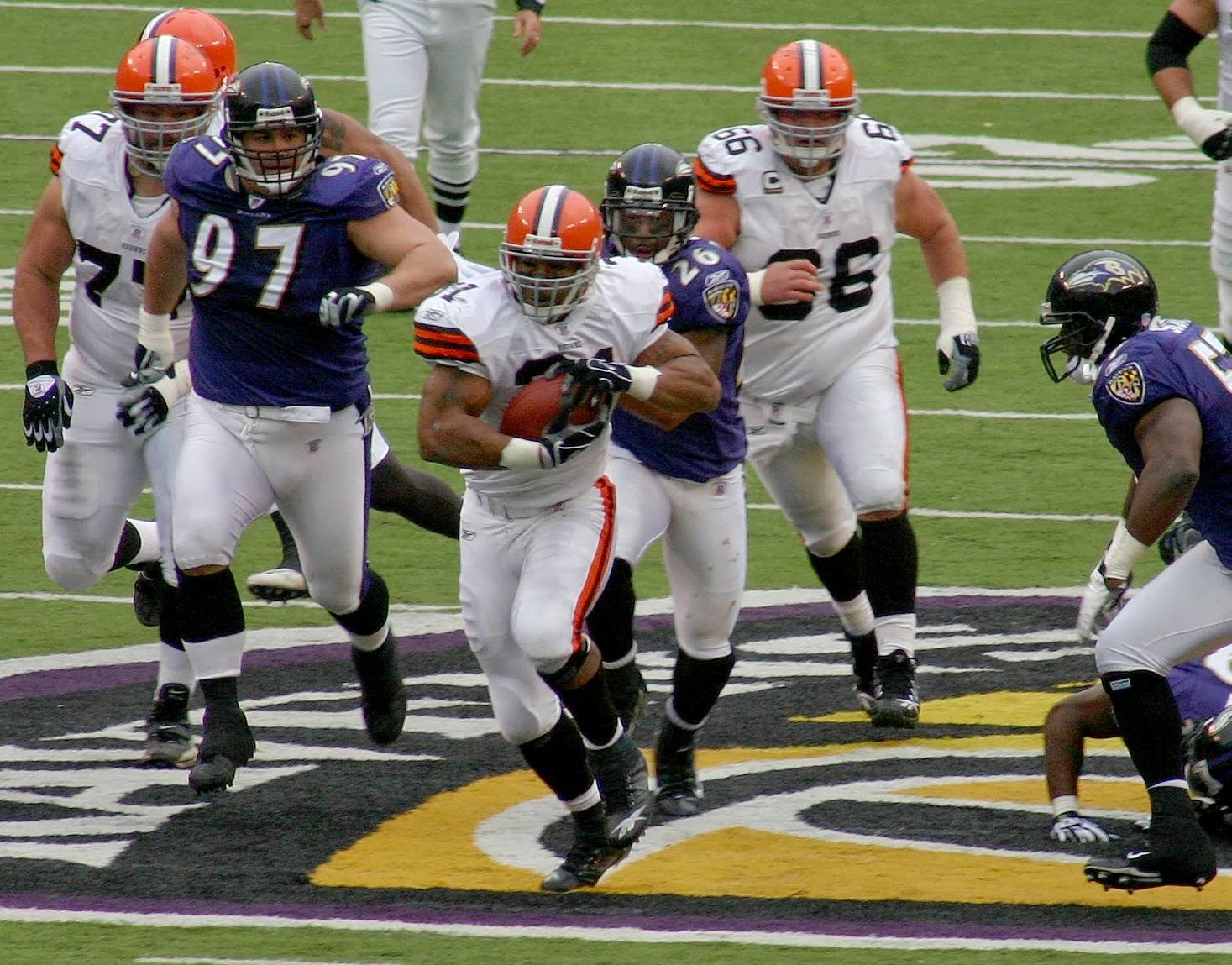
The Ravens defense chases Cleveland's Jamal Lewis in week 11 of 2007

Trying to snap a three-game skid, the Ravens stayed at home for an AFC North rematch with the Cleveland Browns. This game was RB Jamal Lewis' return to Baltimore as a Cleveland Brown.

In the first quarter, Baltimore trailed early as Browns kicker Phil Dawson managed to get a 28-yard field goal for the only score of the period. In the second quarter, the Ravens continued to struggle as Lewis got a 1-yard TD run. Baltimore managed to get on the board with LB Ray Lewis returning an interception 35 yards for a touchdown. Cleveland got one last score prior to halftime, as Dawson kicked a 39-yard field goal.

In the third quarter, the Ravens took the lead with RB Willis McGahee getting a 2-yard TD run. However, the Browns responded as QB Derek Anderson (another former Raven) got a 1-yard TD run, while Safety Brodney Pool returned an interception 100 yards for a touchdown. In the fourth quarter, Baltimore began to come back as kicker Matt Stover made 34-yard and 41-yard field goals, while QB Kyle Boller completed a 27-yard TD pass to WR Devard Darling (his first career touchdown reception). Afterwards, Stover helped the Ravens retake the lead with a 47-yard field goal. Cleveland got into field goal range. Initially, Dawson's 51-yard attempt was ruled no good. However, it turned out that the ball bounced off the upright, then bounced off the support bar, and then went back into play. In the end, the Browns were awarded the field goal. In overtime, Cleveland sealed the win as Dawson made the game-winning 33-yard field goal.

With their fourth-straight loss, not only did Baltimore fall to 4–6, but it marked the first time since 2001 that they were swept by Cleveland.

=== Week 12: at San Diego Chargers ===
Quarter	1	2	3	4	Total
Ravens	0	7	7	0	14
Chargers	0	22	7	3	32

- Game time: 4:15 pm. EST
- Game weather: Clear, 69 °F (21 °C)
- Game attendance: 63,337
- Referee: Tony Corrente
- TV announcers (CBS): Dick Enberg (play-by-play) & Randy Cross (color commentator)

Trying to snap a four-game skid, the Ravens flew to Qualcomm Stadium for a Week 12 duel with the San Diego Chargers. After a scoreless first quarter, Baltimore trailed as Chargers kicker Nate Kaeding managed to get a 27-yard field goal. The Ravens took the lead with RB Willis McGahee getting a 1-yard TD run. San Diego retook the lead with QB Philip Rivers completing a 35-yard TD pass to TE Antonio Gates (with a failed PAT), Kaeding kicking a 46-yard field goal, Rivers completing a 5-yard TD pass to WR Chris Chambers, and Kaeding kicking a 41-yard field goal.

In the third quarter, Baltimore's struggles continued as Rivers and Gates hooked up with each other again on a 25-yard TD pass. The Ravens’ QB Kyle Boller completed a 13-yard TD pass to rookie FB Le'Ron McClain. In the fourth quarter, the Chargers sealed the win with Kaeding nailing a 41-yard field goal.

With the loss, not only did Baltimore fall to 4–7, but it marked the first time in franchise history that the Ravens had lost five straight games.

=== Week 13: vs. New England Patriots ===
Quarter	1	2	3	4	Total
Patriots	3	7	7	10	27
Ravens	7	3	7	7	24

at M&T Bank Stadium, Baltimore, Maryland

- Game time: 8:30 pm. EST
- Game weather: Clear, 40 °F (4 °C)
- Game attendance: 71,382
- Referee: Walt Anderson
- TV announcers (ESPN): Mike Tirico (play-by-play), Ron Jaworski, Tony Kornheiser (color commentators), Michele Tafoya, and Suzy Kolber (field reporters)

Trying to snap a five-game losing skid, the Ravens went home for a Week 13 Monday Night intra conference duel with the New England Patriots, who were undefeated at 11–0. In the first quarter, Baltimore trailed early as Patriots kicker Stephen Gostkowski made a 21-yard field goal. Afterwards, the Ravens took the lead with QB Kyle Boller completing a 4-yard TD pass to WR Derrick Mason. In the second quarter, Baltimore increased its lead with kicker Matt Stover getting a 29-yard field goal. Later, New England tied the game prior to halftime as FB Heath Evans got a 1-yard TD run.

In the third quarter, the Ravens regained the lead with RB Willis McGahee getting a 17-yard TD run. Afterwards, the Patriots tied the game with QB Tom Brady completing a 3-yard TD pass to WR Randy Moss. In the fourth quarter, Baltimore took the lead again as Boller completed a 1-yard TD pass to TE Daniel Wilcox. Afterwards, New England drew closer with Gostkowski making a 38-yard field goal. The Ravens had a chance to win and stuffed Tom Brady on a quarterback sneak on 4th and 1. However, defensive coordinator Rex Ryan called a timeout right before the play, giving the Patriots another chance. Brady then successfully did the QB Sneak to get the 1st down. The Patriots retook the lead with Brady completing an 8-yard TD pass to WR Jabar Gaffney. Boller's hail-mary pass was completed to WR Mark Clayton at New England's 2-yard line; he was tackled as time expired.

With the loss, the Ravens fell to 4–8, and were eliminated from postseason contention for the first time since 2005.

=== Week 14: vs. Indianapolis Colts ===
Quarter	1	2	3	4	Total
Colts	23	14	7	0	44
Ravens	0	7	0	13	20

at M&T Bank Stadium, Baltimore, Maryland

- Game time: 8:15 pm. EST
- Game weather: Showers, 40 °F (4 °C)
- Game attendance: 70,513
- Referee: Walt Coleman
- TV announcers (NBC): Al Michaels (play-by-play), John Madden (color commentator), and Andrea Kremer (field reporter)

Trying to snap a six-game losing skid, the Ravens stayed at home for a Week 14 Sunday Night duel with the Indianapolis Colts in the rematch of last year's AFC Divisional game. In the first quarter, Baltimore trailed early as Colts QB Peyton Manning completed a 34-yard TD pass to WR Reggie Wayne, while RB Joseph Addai got a 1-yard TD run. Afterwards, Indianapolis’ Manning completed a 19-yard TD pass to Addai, while CB Michael Coe blocked a punt, causing it to go out of bounds through the Ravens’ endzone for a safety. In the second quarter, the Colts’ Addai ran for an 11-yard TD run. Baltimore responded with rookie WR Yamon Figurs returning the ensuing kickoff 94 yards for a touchdown. Afterwards, Indianapolis struck again with Manning completing a 57-yard TD pass to WR Anthony Gonzalez.

In the third quarter, the Colts’ Manning completed a 40-yard TD pass to Gonzalez for the only score of the period. In the fourth quarter, the Ravens’ QB Kyle Boller completed a 4-yard TD pass to WR Devard Darling, while rookie QB Troy Smith got a 6-yard TD run.

With their seventh-straight loss, Baltimore fell to 4–9 and to last place in the AFC North with the Bengals’ win over the Rams.

=== Week 15: at Miami Dolphins ===
Quarter	1	2	3	4	OT	Total
Ravens	3	10	0	3	0	16
Dolphins	0	3	7	6	6	22

at Dolphin Stadium, Miami Gardens, Florida

- Game time: 1:00 p.m. EST
- TV announcers (CBS): Kevin Harlan (play-by-play) & Rich Gannon (color commentator)

Trying to snap a seven-game slide, the Ravens flew to Dolphin Stadium for a Week 15 intraconference duel with winless Miami Dolphins. In the first quarter, Baltimore took flight early as kicker Matt Stover managed to get a 27-yard field goal for the only score of the period. In the second quarter, the Ravens increased their lead as Stover kicked a 39-yard field goal. The Dolphins got on the board with kicker Jay Feely getting a 23-yard field goal. Baltimore ended the half as QB Kyle Boller completed a 17-yard TD pass to WR Derrick Mason.

In the third quarter, Miami began to rally as RB Samkon Gado got a 7-yard TD run for the only score of the period. In the fourth quarter, the Dolphins took the lead as Feely kicked a 22-yard and a 29-yard field goal. The Ravens tied the game with Stover nailing an 18-yard field goal. However, in overtime, the Dolphins sealed their first and only win of the year as QB Cleo Lemon completed a 64-yard TD pass to WR Greg Camarillo.

With their eighth-straight loss, the Ravens fell to 4–10. The win for the Dolphins turned out to be their only victory of the season as they improved to 1–13.

=== Week 16: at Seattle Seahawks ===
Quarter	1	2	3	4	Total
Ravens	0	0	0	6	6
Seahawks	0	21	6	0	27

at Qwest Field, Seattle

- Game time: 4:15 p.m. EST
- Game weather: Rainy, 43 °F (6 °C)
- Game attendance: 68,164
- Referee: Bill Carollo
- TV announcers (CBS): Bill Macatee (play-by-play) & Steve Beuerlein (color commentator)

Trying to snap an eight-game skid, the Ravens flew to Qwest Field for a Week 16 interconference duel with the Seattle Seahawks. Although the team was in its twelfth season, this was the Ravens’ first-ever regular season contest in Seattle. After a scoreless first quarter, Baltimore's seasonal struggles continued as in the second quarter, Seahawks QB Matt Hasselbeck completed a 21-yard TD pass to WR Nate Burleson, along with LB Leroy Hill returning a fumble 20 yards for a touchdown and Hasselbeck completing a 14-yard TD pass to RB Shaun Alexander.

In the third quarter, Seattle increased its lead with kicker Josh Brown nailing a 42-yard and a 39-yard field goal. In the fourth quarter, the Ravens got their only score of the game as rookie QB Troy Smith completing a 79-yard TD pass to WR Derrick Mason (with a failed two-point conversion).

With the loss, Baltimore fell to 4–11.

=== Week 17: vs. Pittsburgh Steelers ===
Quarter	1	2	3	4	Total
Steelers	0	7	0	14	21
Ravens	10	10	7	0	27

at M&T Bank Stadium, Baltimore

- Game time: 4:15 p.m. EST
- Game weather: Rainy, 42 °F (6 °C)
- Game attendance: 71,353
- Referee: Gerald Austin
- TV announcers (CBS): Jim Nantz (play-by-play) & Phil Simms (color commentator)

Hoping to end a horrendous season on a high note, the Ravens went home for a Week 17 AFC North rematch with the season's AFC North champion Pittsburgh Steelers. In the first quarter, Baltimore took flight as RB Musa Smith got a 2-yard TD run, along with kicker Matt Stover getting a 28-yard field goal. In the second quarter, the Ravens increased their lead as RB Cory Ross got a 32-yard TD run. The Steelers responded with RB Najeh Davenport getting a 1-yard TD run. Baltimore ended the half with Stover nailing a 31-yard field goal.

In the third quarter, the Ravens continued to lead as rookie QB Troy Smith completed a 15-yard TD pass to WR Devard Darling for the only score of the period. In the fourth quarter, Pittsburgh began to come back as QB Charlie Batch completed a 59-yard TD pass to WR Santonio Holmes and a 7-yard TD pass to WR Cedric Wilson. Afterwards, Baltimore's defense held on for the victory.

With the win, not only did the Ravens end their season at 5–11, but they also snapped their franchise-worst nine-game losing streak. The win also gained the Ravens their 100th regular-season win in franchise history.

== Standings ==
AFC North
	W	L	T	PCT	DIV	CONF	PF	PA	STK
^{(4)} Pittsburgh Steelers	10	6	0	.625	5–1	7–5	393	269	L1
Cleveland Browns	10	6	0	.625	3–3	7–5	402	382	W1
Cincinnati Bengals	7	9	0	.438	3–3	6–6	380	385	W2
Baltimore Ravens	5	11	0	.313	1–5	2–10	275	384	W1
