= Yamon Figurs =

American gridiron football player (born 1983)

No. 16, 13, 82
- Positions: Wide receiver, return specialist

Personal information
- Born: January 10, 1983 (age 43); Fort Pierce, Florida, U.S.
- Listed height: 5 ft 11 in (1.80 m)
- Listed weight: 185 lb (84 kg)

Career information
- High school: Westwood (Fort Pierce)
- College: Kansas State
- NFL draft: 2007: 3rd round, 74th overall pick

Career history
- Baltimore Ravens (2007–2008); Detroit Lions (2009); Tampa Bay Buccaneers (2009); Oakland Raiders (2010); Cleveland Browns (2010); Tennessee Titans (2011)*; Edmonton Eskimos (2012); Saskatchewan Roughriders (2013)*
- * Offseason or practice squad member only

Awards and highlights
- PFWA All-Rookie Team (2007); First-team All-Big 12 (2006)

Career NFL statistics
- Receptions: 5
- Receiving yards: 103
- Receiving touchdowns: 1
- Return yards: 2,296
- Return touchdowns: 2
- Stats at Pro Football Reference

Yamon Figurs (born January 10, 1983) is an American former professional football player who played as a wide receiver and return specialist in the National Football League (NFL) and Canadian Football League (CFL). He played college football for the Kansas State Wildcats and was selected by the Baltimore Ravens in the third round of the 2007 NFL draft.

Figurs was also a member of the Detroit Lions, Tampa Bay Buccaneers, Oakland Raiders, Cleveland Browns, Tennessee Titans, Edmonton Eskimos and Saskatchewan Roughriders.

== Early life ==
Figurs played high school football at Westwood High School in Fort Pierce, Florida. While there he was a three-year starter and earned All-Conference and All-Area honors as a senior. He also lettered in track and field and basketball.

== College career ==
Figurs played college football at Kansas State. During his senior year, he earned first-team All-Big 12 honors as a return specialist. He finished his career with 73 receptions for 1,144 yards, and 2,275 all-purpose yards. In 2006, he received a bachelor's degree in social science.

== Professional career ==
Pre-draft measurables
Height	Weight	40-yard dash	10-yard split	20-yard split	20-yard shuttle	Three-cone drill	Vertical jump	Broad jump
5 ft 11 in (1.80 m)	174 lb (79 kg)	4.30 s	1.47 s	2.49 s	4.21 s	6.85 s	32.5 in (0.83 m)	10 ft 3 in (3.12 m)
All values from NFL Combine

=== Baltimore Ravens ===
Figurs was selected by the Baltimore Ravens in the third round of the 2007 NFL draft. During his rookie season, he was the Ravens main kick and punt returner after their starting kick returner B. J. Sams suffered a torn Anterior cruciate ligament on September 10, 2007. He finished the season with one returned kick for a touchdown, one punt return for a touchdown, and one catch for 36 yards.

During the 2008 season, safety Jim Leonhard took over the main return duties. And again Figurs only recorded one catch; however, it was a 43-yard touchdown.

He stayed with the Ravens through the 2009 preseason but failed to make final cuts as he was waived on September 5.

=== Detroit Lions ===
Figurs was claimed off waivers by the Detroit Lions on September 6, 2009. He was waived on September 30.

=== Tampa Bay Buccaneers ===
Figurs was signed by the Tampa Bay Buccaneers on October 13. He was waived on December 22 when the team re-signed wide receiver Micheal Spurlock.

=== Oakland Raiders ===
Figurs signed a future contract with the Oakland Raiders on January 13, 2010. He was cut on September 15, 2010, due in part to a fumble. He caught two passes while on the roster.

=== Cleveland Browns ===
On October 20, 2010 Figurs signed a contract with the Cleveland Browns to replace injured receivers Josh Cribbs and Mohamed Massaquoi. He was waived on October 26. His only statistic occurred when he lost four yards on a handoff.

=== Tennessee Titans ===
On January 13, 2011 Figurs signed a future contract with the Tennessee Titans, but was waived on September 2.

=== Edmonton Eskimos ===
On April 16, 2012 Figurs signed with the Edmonton Eskimos of the Canadian Football League. He was released on June 23, 2012.

=== Saskatchewan Roughriders ===
Figurs left the 2013 Saskatchewan Roughriders training camp after realizing he wasn't going to make the team.
