= Jimmy Spencer (American football) =

American football player (born 1969)

No. 37, 22, 33
- Position: Cornerback

Personal information
- Born: March 29, 1969 (age 57); Manning, South Carolina, U.S.
- Listed height: 5 ft 9 in (1.75 m)
- Listed weight: 188 lb (85 kg)

Career information
- High school: Glades Central (Belle Glade, Florida)
- College: Florida
- NFL draft: 1991: 8th round, 215th overall pick

Career history
- Washington Redskins (1991)*; New Orleans Saints (1992–1995); Cincinnati Bengals (1996–1997); San Diego Chargers (1998–1999); Denver Broncos (2000–2003)
- * Offseason or practice squad member only

Awards and highlights
- Super Bowl champion (XXVI)

Career NFL statistics
- Games played: 177
- Games started: 81
- Tackles: 418
- Interceptions: 26
- Fumble recoveries: 8
- Stats at Pro Football Reference

James Arthur Spencer, Jr. (born March 29, 1969) is an American former professional football player who was a cornerback for 12 seasons in the National Football League (NFL) during the 1990s and early 2000s. Spencer played college football for the Florida Gators, and thereafter, he played in the NFL for the New Orleans Saints, Cincinnati Bengals, San Diego Chargers and Denver Broncos.

== Early life ==
Spencer was born in Manning, South Carolina. He attended Glades Central High School in Belle Glade, Florida, and he played high school football for the Glades Central Raiders.

== College career ==
Spencer accepted an athletic scholarship to attend the University of Florida in Gainesville, Florida, where he played for coach Galen Hall and coach Steve Spurrier's Gators teams from 1988 to 1990. In 1990, he blocked a punt late in the fourth quarter, which Richard Fain recovered and returned twenty-five yards for a touchdown and providing the margin of victory in the Gators' 17–13 victory over the Alabama Crimson Tide in Tuscaloosa, Alabama. Spencer decided to forgo his final year of NCAA eligibility after his junior season in 1990, and made himself eligible for the NFL draft.

== Professional career ==
The Washington Redskins selected Spencer in the eighth round (215th pick overall) of the 1991 NFL draft. Spencer played for the New Orleans Saints from 1992 to 1995, the Cincinnati Bengals in 1996 and 1997, the San Diego Chargers in 1998 and 1999, and the Denver Broncos from 2000 to 2003. Statistically, his best seasons were 1994, 1995 and 1996, when he was a regular starter for New Orleans and then Cincinnati.

In his twelve NFL seasons, Spencer played in 177 regular season games, and started eighty-one of them. He finished his NFL career with twenty-six interceptions, two touchdown returns, eight fumble recoveries and one fumble recovery for a touchdown.

In 2003, Spencer worked as an assistant defensive back coach with the Broncos in addition to playing, making him the first simultaneous player/coach in the NFL since Dan Reeves in 1972.

== See also ==
- Florida Gators football, 1980–89
- Florida Gators football, 1990–99
- History of the Denver Broncos
- List of Florida Gators in the NFL draft
- List of New Orleans Saints players
