= Johnnie Dixon =

Johnnie Dixon may refer to:

- Johnnie Dixon (defensive back) (born 1988), American former defensive back
- Johnnie Dixon (wide receiver) (born 1994), American wide receiver
- Johnnie Bob Dixon (1899–1985), American baseball pitcher
