= Eagle Academy =

Eagle Academy is the name of several schools in the United States and other countries:

- Eagle Academy (Belle Glade), a boot camp–styled school or behavior modification facility in Belle Glade country, Florida
- Eagle Academy (Eagle, Idaho), an alternative high school in Eagle, Idaho
- Eagle Academy for Young Men, an all-boys' public middle school in the Bronx, New York

== See also ==
- EAGLES Academy, a public high school for LGBT students in Hollywood, Los Angeles, California
