= Rhondy Weston =

American football player (born 1966)

No. 77
- Positions: Defensive tackle, defensive end

Personal information
- Born: June 7, 1966 (age 60); Belle Glade, Florida, U.S.
- Listed height: 6 ft 5 in (1.96 m)
- Listed weight: 275 lb (125 kg)

Career information
- High school: Glades Central (Belle Glade)
- College: Florida
- NFL draft: 1989: 3rd round, 68th overall pick

Career history
- Dallas Cowboys (1989)*; Tampa Bay Buccaneers (1989); Cleveland Browns (1990)
- * Offseason or practice squad member only

Awards and highlights
- First-team All-SEC (1987); Second-team All-SEC (1988)

Career NFL statistics
- Sacks: 2
- Fumble recoveries: 1
- Stats at Pro Football Reference

Rhondy Weston (born June 7, 1966) is an American former professional football player who was a defensive tackle in the National Football League (NFL) for the Tampa Bay Buccaneers. He played college football at the University of Florida. The Dallas Cowboys selected him in the third round of the 1989 NFL draft.

== Early life ==
Weston was born in Belle Glade, Florida. He attended Glades Central High School, where he played defensive tackle for the Glades Central Raiders.

As a senior, he was recognized as a high school All-American. One of his teammates was future NFL player Louis Oliver.

== College career ==
Weston accepted a football scholarship from the University of Florida, and played for head coach Galen Hall's Florida Gators football team from 1985 to 1988.

As a freshman, he was a backup and had 2 sacks in the third game of the season against Mississippi State University. The next year he was named the starter at right defensive tackle and posted 96 tackles, including a season-high 15 tackles against the University of Georgia.

As a junior in 1987, he was a first-team All-SEC selection and an honorable-mention All-American, after finishing the year with 54 tackles, 14 tackles for loss (second on the team) and 6 sacks (second on the team), although he played the final four games with a broken jaw he suffered in a nightclub fight. He was a part of a defense that was third in the nation in pass defense (123.6 yards per game), fourth in total defense (247.8) and recorded back-back shutouts for the first time in school history since 1956.

As a senior, Weston was part of a dominant defensive line, along with Trace Armstrong and Jeff Roth. He suffered injuries in the preseason that kept him from starting 2 of the season's first 5 games. He returned against Mississippi State University, tallying 4 tackles (2 for loss), 2 passes defensed and his only career interception. Against Memphis State University, he had a season-high 10 tackles, one sack and one forced fumble. He finished the year with 49 tackles, 15 tackles for loss (led the team), 10 sacks (led the team), 5 passes defensed, one forced fumble, was a second-team All-SEC selection and an honorable-mention All-American.

== Professional career ==
=== Dallas Cowboys ===
Weston was selected by the Dallas Cowboys in the third round (68th overall pick) of the 1989 NFL draft. After having a disappointing training camp, he was waived on August 29 and replaced with defensive tackle Dean Hamel.

=== Tampa Bay Buccaneers ===
In 1989, Weston was claimed by the Tampa Bay Buccaneers and eventually released on September 4. He was signed to the team's practice squad on September 6. He was promoted to the active roster during the regular season and played in twelve games, with two starts, at defensive end. He had two quarterback sacks and a fumble recovery.

=== Cleveland Browns ===
On March 8, 1990, Weston signed with the Cleveland Browns as a free agent, but suffered a right knee injury and was placed on the injured reserve list on September 8. He never fully recovered and was waived injured on August 19, 1991.

== Personal life ==
Weston's mother died in a car accident when he was a junior in college. He donated one of his kidneys to childhood friend Tommy Duhart, who had battled severe diabetes.

He later returned to Gainesville and completed his bachelor's degree in health and human performance, graduating from the University of Florida in 2010.

== See also ==
- Florida Gators football, 1980–89
- History of the Tampa Bay Buccaneers
- List of Florida Gators in the NFL draft
- List of University of Florida alumni
