= 2011 Baltimore Ravens season =

NFL team season

- Owner: Steve Bisciotti
- General manager: Ozzie Newsome
- Head coach: John Harbaugh
- Offensive coordinator: Cam Cameron
- Defensive coordinator: Chuck Pagano
- Home stadium: M&T Bank Stadium

Results
- Record: 12–4
- Division place: 1st AFC North
- Playoffs: Won Divisional Playoffs (vs. Texans) 20–13; Lost AFC Championship (at Patriots) 20–23
- Pro Bowlers: RB Ray Rice; FB Vonta Leach; G Marshal Yanda; DT Haloti Ngata; OLB Terrell Suggs; MLB Ray Lewis; FS Ed Reed

Uniform
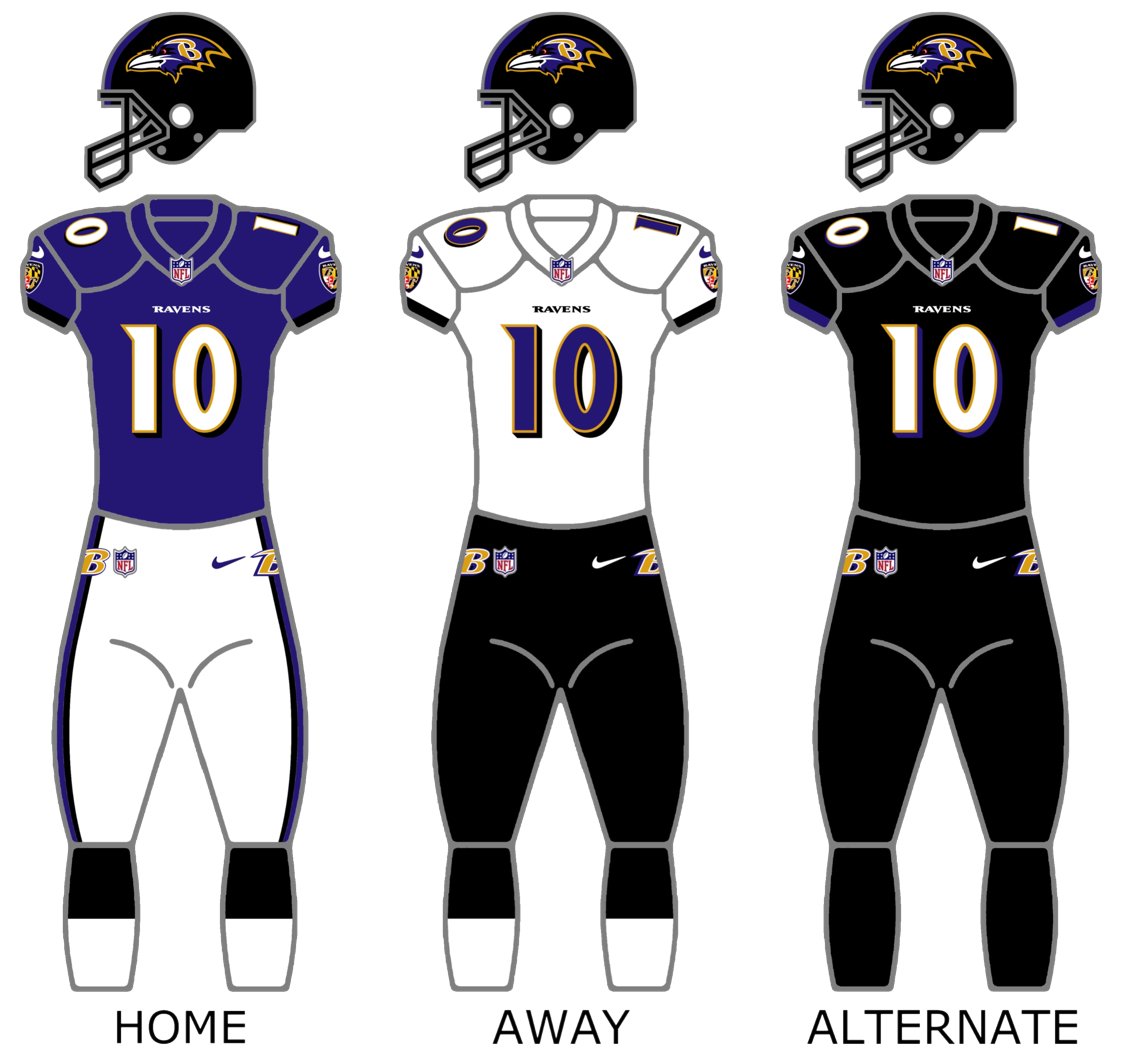

The 2011 season was the Baltimore Ravens' 16th in the National Football League (NFL), their fourth under head coach John Harbaugh and their 10th under general manager Ozzie Newsome.

The 2011 season marked one of the most successful seasons in Baltimore Ravens franchise history. The Ravens completed the season with a 12–4 record, matching their record from 2010, and winning the AFC North division title for the third time in franchise history. By earning a playoff berth in 2011, the Ravens set a franchise record by going to the postseason for four consecutive seasons. This was also the first and only season so far the Ravens went 6-0 in their division.

Over his first four years, Harbaugh compiled an overall record of 44–20 in the regular season and 5–4 in the postseason. The Ravens avenged their 2010 divisional round playoff loss against the Steelers in week 1 of the season with a big 35–7 victory at home. The 2011 campaign also marked the first time the Ravens played a Thanksgiving game: the Ravens played the San Francisco 49ers and won 16–6. (San Francisco was coached by John Harbaugh's brother Jim, and many dubbed the Thanksgiving game the "Harbaugh Bowl.") Coincidentally the Ravens and 49ers would meet next year in Super Bowl XLVII, which saw the Ravens win their 2nd title in franchise history.

After defeating the Cincinnati Bengals in week 17, the Ravens earned the first-round bye for the first time since 2006 as the second seed in the AFC. They won the Divisional Round against the Houston Texans but were defeated by the New England Patriots in the Conference Championship game, 23–20 after wide receiver Lee Evans failed to catch what likely would have been the game-winning touchdown on 2nd down and 1, and placekicker Billy Cundiff missed a game-tying 32-yard field goal attempt with 11 seconds remaining in regulation.

Linebacker Terrell Suggs was named Defensive Player of the Year.

== Offseason ==
=== Signings and Re-signings ===
On July 26, 2011 it was announced that the Ravens had agreed to terms on re-signing G/T Marshal Yanda to a 5-year contract. However, the Ravens could not officially sign him until July 29, 2011.

On July 30, 2011 the Ravens re-signed Cornerback Chris Carr.

On July 31, 2011 the Ravens signed former Texans FB Vonta Leach.

On August 8, 2011 the Ravens signed former Dolphins RB Ricky Williams.

Later on during the pre season, the Ravens added Left tackle Bryant McKinnie from the Minnesota Vikings, Wide Receiver Lee Evans from the Buffalo Bills, and Offensive Center Andre Gurode from the Dallas Cowboys.

=== Departures and Releases ===
On July 26, 2011, the Ravens announced that they would release 4 former/current starters, TE Todd Heap, WR Derrick Mason, NT Kelly Gregg, and HB Willis McGahee. The Ravens also said they hope to bring back Heap, Mason, and Gregg at reduced salaries.

Signings by Team:

- WR Donté Stallworth, G/C Chris Chester and CB Josh Wilson signed with the Washington Redskins.
- NT Kelly Gregg, FB Le'Ron McClain and LT Jared Gaither signed with the Kansas City Chiefs.
- HB Willis McGahee signed with the Denver Broncos.
- SS Dawan Landry signed with the Jacksonville Jaguars.
- TE Todd Heap signed with the Arizona Cardinals.
- WR Derrick Mason signed with the New York Jets.

=== 2011 NFL draft ===
2011 Baltimore Ravens draft
Round	Pick	Player	Position	College	Notes
1	27	Jimmy Smith	CB	Colorado	
2	58	Torrey Smith	WR	Maryland	
3	85	Jah Reid	OT	Central Florida	
4	123	Tandon Doss	WR	Indiana	
5	164	Chykie Brown	CB	Texas	
5	165	Pernell McPhee	DE	Mississippi State	
6	180	Tyrod Taylor *	QB	Virginia Tech	
7	225	Anthony Allen	RB	Georgia Tech	
Made roster † Pro Football Hall of Fame * Made at least one Pro Bowl during career

^{^[a]} The Ravens traded its original fifth-round selection (#157 overall) to the Seattle Seahawks in exchange for CB Josh Wilson.
^{^[b]} Compensatory selection.
^{^[c]} The Ravens acquired this sixth-round selection from the St. Louis Rams in exchange for its original seventh-round selection (#228 overall) and WR Mark Clayton.
^{^[d]} The Ravens acquired this seventh-round selection in a trade that sent DE Antwan Barnes to the Philadelphia Eagles.
^{^[e]} The Ravens held the #26 overall pick, but allowed their 10-minute window to expire before making their selection. Before the Ravens made their pick, the Kansas City Chiefs holding the following selection picked WR Jon Baldwin, making the Ravens selection #27 overall.
^{^[f]} The Ravens traded the 90th overall pick and a sixth round selection (191st overall) to the Eagles who picked CB Curtis Marsh and Guard Jason Kelce for the 85th overall pick (Jah Reid)

=== Undrafted free agents ===
Name	Position	College
Tim Barnes	Center	Missouri
Justin Boren	Guard	Ohio State
Josh Bynes	Linebacker	Auburn
Damien Berry	Running back	Miami (FL)
Ryan Mahaffey	Fullback	Northern Iowa
Patrick Scales	Long snapper	Utah State
Eric Vanden Heuvel	Tackle	Wisconsin

== Personnel ==
=== Staff ===
Baltimore Ravens 2011 staff
Front office: Owner – Steve Bisciotti; Minority owner – Art Modell; President – Dick Cass; general manager/Executive Vice President – Ozzie Newsome; Vice president of football administration – Pat Moriarty; Senior personnel assistant – George Kokinis; Director of player personnel – Eric DeCosta; Director of pro personnel – Vince Newsome; Director of college scouting – Joe Hortiz; Assistant director of pro personnel – Chad Alexander; Head coaches: Head coach – John Harbaugh; Head coach's assistant – Matt Weiss; Offensive coaches: Offensive coordinator – Cam Cameron; Running backs – Wilbert Montgomery; Wide receivers – Jim Hostler; Tight ends – Wade Harman; Offensive line – Andy Moeller; Assistant offensive line – Todd Washington; Offensive assistant/quarterbacks – Craig Ver Steeg; Offensive quality control – Jason Brooks	Defensive coaches: Defensive coordinator – Chuck Pagano; Defensive line – Clarence Brooks; Linebackers – Dean Pees; Outside linebackers – Ted Monachino; Secondary – Teryl Austin; Defensive assistant/secondary – Roy Anderson; Defensive coaching assistant – Drew Wilkins; Special teams coaches: Associate head coach/special teams coordinator – Jerry Rosburg; Assistant special teams – Marwan Maalouf; Kicking consultant – Randy Brown; Strength and conditioning: Strength and conditioning – Bob Rogucki; Assistant strength and conditioning – John Dunn; Assistant athletic trainer – Kevin Domboski; Assistant athletic trainer – Ron Medlin

=== Final roster ===
2011 Baltimore Ravens roster
Quarterbacks (QB): 5 Joe Flacco; 2 Tyrod Taylor; Running backs (RB): 35 Anthony Allen; 44 Vonta Leach FB; 27 Ray Rice; 34 Ricky Williams; Wide receivers (WR): 81 Anquan Boldin; 17 Tandon Doss; 83 Lee Evans; 82 Torrey Smith; 15 LaQuan Williams; Tight ends (TE): 84 Ed Dickson; 88 Dennis Pitta; 87 Kris Wilson	Offensive linemen (OL): 77 Matt Birk C; 66 Ben Grubbs G; 65 Andre Gurode C; 71 D. J. Jones T; 78 Bryant McKinnie T; 74 Michael Oher T; 76 Jah Reid T; 73 Marshal Yanda G; Defensive linemen (DL): 62 Terrence Cody NT; 97 Arthur Jones DE; 91 Brandon McKinney NT; 90 Pernell McPhee DE; 92 Haloti Ngata DE; 93 Cory Redding DE	Linebackers (LB): 51 Brendon Ayanbadejo ILB; 59 Dannell Ellerbe ILB; 95 Jarret Johnson OLB; 56 Edgar Jones OLB; 94 Sergio Kindle OLB; 99 Paul Kruger OLB; 52 Ray Lewis ILB; 53 Jameel McClain ILB; 50 Albert McClellan OLB; 55 Terrell Suggs OLB; Defensive backs (DB): 23 Chykie Brown CB; 25 Chris Carr CB; 37 Emanuel Cook SS; 36 Danny Gorrer CB; 43 Haruki Nakamura FS; 31 Bernard Pollard SS; 20 Ed Reed FS; 22 Jimmy Smith CB; 21 Lardarius Webb CB; 29 Cary Williams CB; 28 Tom Zbikowski SS; Special teams (ST): 46 Morgan Cox LS; 12 Shayne Graham K; 7 Billy Cundiff K; 4 Sam Koch P	Practice squad: 30 Damien Berry RB; 67 Justin Boren G; 10 Rodney Bradley WR (IR); 49 Josh Bynes LB; 80 Davon Drew TE; 68 Bryan Hall DT; 60 Cecil Newton C; 63 Kenny Wiggins T; 14 Patrick Williams WR; Reserve: 24 Domonique Foxworth CB (IR); 70 Ramon Harewood T (IR); 32 Matt Lawrence RB (IR); 58 Mike McAdoo OLB (IR); 16 David Reed WR (IR); 47 Chavis Williams OLB (IR); Rookies in italics 53 active, 7 reserve, 8 practice squad

== Schedule ==
=== Preseason ===
Week	Date	Opponent	Result	Record	Venue	Recap
1	August 11	at Philadelphia Eagles	L 6–13	0–1	Lincoln Financial Field	Recap
2	August 19	Kansas City Chiefs	W 31–13	1–1	M&T Bank Stadium	Recap
3	August 25	Washington Redskins	W 34–31	2–1	M&T Bank Stadium	Recap
4	September 1	at Atlanta Falcons	W 21–7	3–1	Georgia Dome	Recap

=== Regular season ===
Week	Date	Opponent	Result	Record	Venue	Recap
1	September 11	Pittsburgh Steelers	W 35–7	1–0	M&T Bank Stadium	Recap
2	September 18	at Tennessee Titans	L 13–26	1–1	LP Field	Recap
3	September 25	at St. Louis Rams	W 37–7	2–1	Edward Jones Dome	Recap
4	October 2	New York Jets	W 34–17	3–1	M&T Bank Stadium	Recap
5	Bye					
6	October 16	Houston Texans	W 29–14	4–1	M&T Bank Stadium	Recap
7	October 24	at Jacksonville Jaguars	L 7–12	4–2	EverBank Field	Recap
8	October 30	Arizona Cardinals	W 30–27	5–2	M&T Bank Stadium	Recap
9	November 6	at Pittsburgh Steelers	W 23–20	6–2	Heinz Field	Recap
10	November 13	at Seattle Seahawks	L 17–22	6–3	CenturyLink Field	Recap
11	November 20	Cincinnati Bengals	W 31–24	7–3	M&T Bank Stadium	Recap
12	November 24	San Francisco 49ers	W 16–6	8–3	M&T Bank Stadium	Recap
13	December 4	at Cleveland Browns	W 24–10	9–3	Cleveland Browns Stadium	Recap
14	December 11	Indianapolis Colts	W 24–10	10–3	M&T Bank Stadium	Recap
15	December 18	at San Diego Chargers	L 14–34	10–4	Qualcomm Stadium	Recap
16	December 24	Cleveland Browns	W 20–14	11–4	M&T Bank Stadium	Recap
17	January 1	at Cincinnati Bengals	W 24–16	12–4	Paul Brown Stadium	Recap

== Game summaries ==
=== Regular season ===
==== Week 1: vs. Pittsburgh Steelers ====
Week One: Pittsburgh Steelers at Baltimore Ravens – Game summary

Quarter	1	2	3	4	Total
Steelers	0	7	0	0	7
Ravens	14	7	11	3	35

at M&T Bank Stadium, Baltimore, Maryland

- Date: September 11
- Game time: 1:00 p.m. EDT
- Game weather: 75 °F or 23.9 °C (Partly Cloudy)
- Game attendance: 71,434
- Referee: Tony Corrente
- TV announcers (CBS): Jim Nantz and Phil Simms

Game information

First quarter

- BAL – Anquan Boldin 27 yd. pass from Joe Flacco (Billy Cundiff kick), Ravens 7–0
- BAL – Ray Rice 1 yd. run (Billy Cundiff kick), Ravens 14–0

Second quarter

- PIT – Emmanuel Sanders 11 yd. pass from Ben Rothlisberger (Shaun Suisham kick), Ravens 14–7
- BAL -Ray Rice 11 yd. pass from Joe Flacco (Billy Cundiff kick), Ravens 21–7

Third quarter

- BAL – Ed Dickson 18 yd. pass from Joe Flacco (Sam Koch run), Ravens 29–7
- BAL – Billy Cundiff 29 yd. Field Goal, Ravens 32–7

Fourth quarter

- BAL – Billy Cundiff 30 yd. Field Goal, Ravens 35–7

Top passers

- PIT – Ben Roethlisberger – 22/41, 280 yards, 1 TD, 3 INTs
- BAL – Joe Flacco – 17/29, 224 yards, 3 TDs

Top rushers

- PIT – Rashard Mendenhall – 12 rushes, 45 yards
- BAL – Ray Rice – 19 rushes, 107 yards, 1 TD

Top receivers

- PIT – Mike Wallace – 8 receptions, 107 yards
- BAL – Anquan Boldin – 4 receptions, 74 yards, 1 TD

Top tacklers

- PIT – Lawrence Timmons – 10 tackles, 2 assists
- BAL – Lardarius Webb – 9 tackles, 2 assists, 0.5 sack

On the first play from scrimmage, Ray Rice scampered for 36 yards and would finish the game with 107 rushing yards, in the previous season the Steelers had given up an average of 62.8 rushing yards per game. Two plays later Joe Flacco threw a 27-yard strike to Anquan Boldin, giving the Ravens a lead they would never relinquish. Defense would be the story of this game, however, as Terrell Suggs strip-sacked Ben Roethlisberger during the Steelers second possession and Haloti Ngata recovered at the Pittsburgh 37-yard line. Suggs ended the game with 3 sacks and the Ravens forced 7 turnovers. With this win not only did the Ravens improve to 1–0, but they handed the Steelers their first opening day loss since 2002.

==== Week 2: at Tennessee Titans ====
Week Two: Baltimore Ravens at Tennessee Titans – Game summary

Quarter	1	2	3	4	Total
Ravens	0	10	0	3	13
Titans	0	10	10	6	26

at LP Field, Nashville, Tennessee

- Date: September 18
- Game time: 1:00 pm. EDT/12:00 p.m. CDT
- Game weather: 76 °F or 24.4 °C (Sunny)
- Game attendance: 69,143
- Referee: Clete Blakeman
- TV announcers (CBS): Bill Macatee and Steve Tasker

Game information

First quarter

- No scoring plays

Second quarter

- TEN – Rob Bironas 25 yd. Field Goal, Titans 3–0
- BAL – Ray Rice 31 yd. pass from Joe Flacco (Billy Cundiff kick), Ravens 7–3
- TEN – Kenny Britt 4 yd. pass from Matt Hasselbeck (Rob Bironas kick), Titans 10–7
- BAL – Billy Cundiff 41 yd. Field Goal, Tied 10–10

Third quarter

- TEN – Javon Ringer 10 yd. run (Rob Bironas kick), Tians 17–10
- TEN – Rob Bironas 43 yd. Field Goal, Tians 20–10

Fourth quarter

- TEN – Rob Bironas 39 yd. Field Goal, Titans 23–10
- BAL – Billy Cundiff 29 yd. Field Goal, Titans 23–13
- TEN – Rob Bironas 33 yd. Field Goal, Tians 26–13

Top passers

- BAL – Joe Flacco – 15/32, 197 yards, 1 touchdown, 2 interceptions
- TEN – Matt Hasselbeck – 30/42, 358 yards, 1 touchdown, 1 interception

Top rushers

- BAL – Ray Rice – 13 carries, 43 yards
- TEN – Chris Johnson – 24 carries, 53 yards

Top receivers

- BAL – Ray Rice – 5 receptions, 53 yards
- TEN – Kenny Britt – 9 receptions, 153 yards, 1 touchdown

Top tacklers

- BAL – Lardarius Webb – 8 tackles, 1 assist
- TEN – Dave Ball – 4 tackles

With this loss, the Ravens fell to 1–1.

==== Week 3: at St. Louis Rams ====
Week Three: Baltimore Ravens at St. Louis Rams – Game summary

Quarter	1	2	3	4	Total
Ravens	21	6	3	7	37
Rams	0	0	7	0	7

at Edward Jones Dome, St. Louis, Missouri

- Date: September 25
- Game time: 4:05 pm. EDT/3:05 pm. CDT
- Game weather: Played indoors (dome stadium)
- Game attendance: 56,289
- Referee: Scott Green
- TV announcers (CBS): Kevin Harlan and Solomon Wilcots

Game information

First quarter

- BAL – Torrey Smith 74 yd. pass from Joe Flacco (Billy Cundiff kick), Ravens 7–0
- BAL – Torrey Smith 41 yd. pass from Joe Flacco (Billy Cundiff kick), Ravens 14–0
- BAL – Torrey Smith 18 yd. pass from Joe Flacco (Billy Cundiff kick), Ravens 21–0

Second quarter

- BAL – Billy Cundiff 21 yd. Field Goal, Ravens 24–0
- BAL – Billy Cundiff 31 yd. Field Goal, Ravens 27–0

Third quarter

- BAL – Billy Cundiff 38 yd. Field Goal, Ravens 30–0
- STL – Brandon Gibson 34 yd. pass from Sam Bradford (Josh Brown kick), Ravens 30–7

Fourth quarter

- BAL – Haloti Ngata 28 yd. fumble return, Ravens 37–7

Top passers

- BAL – Joe Flacco – 27/48, 389 yards, 3 touchdowns
- STL – Sam Bradford – 16/32, 166 yards, 1 touchdown, 1 interception

Top rushers

- BAL – Ray Rice – 9 carries, 81 yards
- STL – Carnell Williams – 18 carries, 75 yards

Top receivers

- BAL – Anquan Boldin – 7 receptions, 74 yards
- STL – Brandon Gibson – 5 receptions, 55 yards, 1 touchdown

Top tacklers

- BAL – Ray Lewis – 10 tackles
- STL – Bradley Fletcher – 6 tackles

Coming off a week 2 loss, the Ravens were determined to bounce back and fight hard. On their second offensive play from scrimmage, Flacco threw a 74-yard touchdown pass to rookie wide receiver Torrey Smith. It was the first catch of Smith's career and the longest pass of Flacco's. Before the first quarter was up, Flacco would throw two more touchdown passes to Smith for 41 and 18 yards respectively, marking the 12th time in NFL history that any receiver caught three touchdown passes in a single quarter, and the first time ever for a rookie. The Ravens would later add 16 more points on three Billy Cundiff field goals and a fumble forced by Ray Lewis and recovered by Haloti Ngata and then run into the end zone (Cundiff also missed two 51-yard field goals). This marked the first and as of 2018 only touchdown in Ngata's career. Offensively, the Ravens gained 553 yards in the entire game, a franchise record. The only score for the Rams came in the third quarter, when quarterback Sam Bradford threw a 34-yard touchdown pass to Brandon Gibson.

With this win, the Ravens improved to 2–1.

==== Week 4: vs. New York Jets ====
Week Four: New York Jets at Baltimore Ravens – Game summary

Quarter	1	2	3	4	Total
Jets	7	10	0	0	17
Ravens	17	10	7	0	34

at M&T Bank Stadium, Baltimore, Maryland

- Date: October 2
- Game time: 8:20 pm. EDT
- Game weather: 51 °F or 10.6 °C (Cloudy)
- Game attendance: 71,247
- Referee: Mike Carey
- TV announcers (NBC): Al Michaels, Cris Collinsworth and Michele Tafoya

Game information

First quarter

- BAL – Jameel McClain 6 yd. fumble return (Billy Cundiff kick), Ravens 7–0
- NYJ – Joe McKnight 107 yd. kickoff return (Nick Folk kick), Tied 7–7
- BAL – Billy Cundiff 38 yd. Field Goal, Ravens 10–7
- BAL – Ray Rice 3 yd. run (Billy Cundiff kick), Ravens 17–7

Second quarter

- BAL – Billy Cundiff 38 yd. Field Goal, Ravens 20–7
- BAL – Jarret Johnson 26 yd. fumble return (Billy Cundiff kick), Ravens 27–7
- NYJ – David Harris 35 yd. interception return (Nick Folk kick), Ravens 27–14
- NYJ – Nick Folk 40 yd. Field Goal, Ravens 27–17

Third quarter

- BAL – Lardarius Webb 73 yd. interception return (Billy Cundiff kick), Ravens 34–17

Fourth quarter

- No scoring plays

Top passers

- NYJ – Mark Sanchez- 11/35, 119 yards, 1 interception
- BAL – Joe Flacco- 10/31, 163 yards, 1 interception

Top rushers

- NYJ – Shonn Greene- 10 rushes, 23 yards
- BAL – Ray Rice- 25 rushes, 66 yards

Top receivers

- NYJ – Plaxico Burress- 3 receptions, 33 yards
- BAL – Ed Dickson- 4 receptions, 45 yards

Top tacklers

- NYJ – Sione Pouha- 8 tackles, 1 tackle for loss
- BAL – Cary Williams- 8 tackles

Coming off their dominating road win over the Rams, the Ravens went home, donned their alternate uniforms, and played a Week 4 Sunday night duel with the New York Jets. Baltimore delivered the game's opening punch with safety Ed Reed forcing a sack-fumble from Jets quarterback Mark Sanchez, allowing linebacker Jameel McClain to recover the fumble and go 6 yards for a touchdown. New York would respond with running back Joe McKnight returning a kickoff 107 yards for a touchdown. Afterwards, the Ravens regained the lead with a 38-yard field goal from kicker Billy Cundiff, followed by a 3-yard touchdown run from running back Ray Rice. Baltimore added onto their lead in the second quarter with another 38-yard field goal from Cundiff, followed by defensive end Haloti Ngata forcing a fumble from Sanchez, allowing linebacker Jarret Johnson to return the fumble 26 yards for a touchdown. The Jets responded with linebacker David Harris returning an interception 36 yards for a touchdown, followed by kicker Nick Folk booting a 40-yard field goal. The Ravens struck back in the third quarter with cornerback Lardarius Webb returning an interception 73 yards for a touchdown. From there, Baltimore's defense prevented any comeback attempt from the Jets.

With this win, the Ravens went into their bye week at 3–1.

==== Week 6: vs. Houston Texans ====
Week Six: Houston Texans at Baltimore Ravens – Game summary

Quarter	1	2	3	4	Total
Texans	0	7	7	0	14
Ravens	7	3	6	13	29

at M&T Bank Stadium, Baltimore, Maryland

- Date: October 16
- Game time: 4:05 pm. EDT
- Game weather: 72 °F or 22.2 °C (Partly Cloudy)
- Game attendance: 71,154
- Referee: Gene Steratore
- TV announcers (CBS): Greg Gumbel and Dan Dierdorf

Game information

First quarter

- BAL – Joe Flacco 1-yard run (Billy Cundiff kick), Ravens 7–0

Second quarter

- HOU – Wade Smith fumble recovery in the end zone (Neil Rackers kick), Tied 7–7
- BAL – Billy Cundiff 43-yard Field Goal, Ravens 10–7

Third quarter

- BAL – Billy Cundiff 48-yard Field Goal, Ravens 13–7
- HOU – Jacoby Jones 32-yard pass from Matt Schaub (Neil Rackers kick), Texans 14–13
- BAL – Billy Cundiff 25-yard Field Goal, Ravens 16–14

Fourth quarter

- BAL – Billy Cundiff 33-yard Field Goal, Ravens 19–14
- BAL – Ricky Williams 4-yard run (Billy Cundiff kick), Ravens 26–14
- BAL – Billy Cundiff 40-yard Field Goal, Ravens 29–14

Top passers

- HOU – Matt Schaub – 21/37, 220 yards, 1 touchdown
- BAL – Joe Flacco – 20/33, 305 yards, 1 interception

Top rushers

- HOU – Arian Foster – 15 carries, 49 yards
- BAL – Ray Rice – 23 carries, 101 yards

Top receivers

- HOU – Kevin Walter – 6 receptions, 52 yards
- BAL – Anquan Boldin – 8 receptions, 132 yards

Top tacklers

- HOU – Danieal Manning – 9 tackles, 2 assists
- BAL – Ray Lewis – 8 tackles, 4 assists

With stadium flags lowered to half-mast in remembrance of the passing of Pat Modell, wife of former owner Art Modell, the Ravens set the tone early with a 9-minute, 93-yard drive for a touchdown. Joe Flacco who scored on a quarterback sneak to cap the drive, also threw for 305 yards while Ray Rice ran for 101 yards. Ray Lewis became the first player in NFL history with 40 sacks and 30 interceptions when he sacked Matt Schaub in the first quarter. With this win, the Ravens improved to 4–1.

==== Week 7: at Jacksonville Jaguars ====
Week Seven: Baltimore Ravens at Jacksonville Jaguars – Game summary

Quarter	1	2	3	4	Total
Ravens	0	0	0	7	7
Jaguars	3	3	3	3	12

at EverBank Field, Jacksonville, Florida

- Date: October 24
- Game time: 8:30 pm. EDT
- Game weather: 72 °F or 22.2 °C (Scattered Clouds)
- Game attendance: 62,976
- Referee: Carl Cheffers
- TV announcers (ESPN): Mike Tirico, Ron Jaworski, Jon Gruden and Sal Paolantonio

Game information

First quarter

- JAC – Josh Scobee 54-yard field goal, Jaguars 3–0. Drive: 4 plays, −3 yards, 1:22.

Second quarter

- JAC – Josh Scobee 54-yard field goal, Jaguars 6–0. Drive: 6 plays, 38 yards, 2:40.

Third quarter

- JAC – Josh Scobee 22-yard field goal, Jaguars 9–0. Drive: 17 plays, 76 yards, 8:30.

Fourth quarter

- BAL – Anquan Boldin 5-yard pass from Joe Flacco (Billy Cundiff kick), Jaguars 9–7. Drive: 13 plays, 90 yards, 3:20.
- JAC – Josh Scobee 51-yard field goal, Jaguars 12–7. Drive: 4 plays, 4 yards, 0:19.

Top passers

- BAL – Joe Flacco – 21/38, 137 yards, 1 TD, 1 INT
- JAC – Blaine Gabbert – 9/20, 93 yards

Top rushers

- BAL – Ray Rice – 8 rushes, 28 yards
- JAC – Maurice Jones-Drew – 30 rushes, 105 yards

Top receivers

- BAL – Anquan Boldin – 4 receptions, 40 yards, 1 TD
- JAC – Jason Hill – 4 receptions, 62 yards

Top tacklers

- BAL – Ray Lewis – 6 tackles, 2 assists
- JAC – Daryl Smith – 6 tackles, 1 sack, 1 forced fumble

With this loss, the Ravens fell to 4–2.

==== Week 8: vs. Arizona Cardinals ====
Week Eight: Arizona Cardinals at Baltimore Ravens – Game summary

Quarter	1	2	3	4	Total
Cardinals	3	21	0	3	27
Ravens	0	6	14	10	30

at M&T Bank Stadium, Baltimore, Maryland

- Date: October 30
- Game time: 1:00 pm. EDT
- Game weather: 48 °F or 8.9 °C (Sunny)
- Game attendance: 71,022
- Referee: Jeff Triplette
- TV announcers (Fox): Sam Rosen, Brian Billick and Laura Okmin

Game information

First quarter

- ARI – Jay Feely 32-yard Field Goal, Cardinals 3–0

Second quarter

- BAL – Billy Cundiff 26-yard Field Goal, Tied 3–3
- ARI – Chris Wells 1-yard run (Jay Feely kick), Cardinals 10–3
- ARI – Patrick Peterson 82-yard punt return (Jay Feely kick), Cardinals 17–3
- ARI – Early Doucet 10-yard pass from Kevin Kolb (Jay Feely kick), Cardinals 24–3
- BAL – Billy Cundiff 47-yard Field Goal, Cardinals 24–6

Third quarter

- BAL – Ray Rice 1-yard run (Billy Cundiff kick), Cardinals 24–13
- BAL – Ray Rice 1-yard run (Billy Cundiff kick), Cardinals 24–20

Fourth quarter

- BAL – Ray Rice 3-yard run (Billy Cundiff kick), Ravens 27–24
- ARI – Jay Feely 45-yard Field Goal, Tied 27–27
- BAL – Billy Cundiff 25-yard Field Goal, Ravens 30–27

Top passers

- ARI – Kevin Kolb – 10/21, 153 yards, 1 touchdown, 1 interception
- BAL – Joe Flacco – 31/51, 336 yards, 1 interception

Top rushers

- ARI – Chris Wells – 22 carries, 83 yards, 1 touchdown
- BAL – Ray Rice – 18 carries, 63 yards, 3 touchdowns

Top receivers

- ARI – Larry Fitzgerald – 3 receptions, 98 yards
- BAL – Anquan Bolden – 7 receptions, 145 yards

Top tacklers

- ARI – Rashad Johnson – 7 tackles, 1 assist
- BAL – Terrell Suggs – 9 tackles, 4 assists, 1 sack

With this win, the Ravens improved to 5–2.

==== Week 9: at Pittsburgh Steelers ====
Week Nine: Baltimore Ravens at Pittsburgh Steelers – Game summary

Quarter	1	2	3	4	Total
Ravens	3	6	7	7	23
Steelers	0	6	0	14	20

at Heinz Field, Pittsburgh, Pennsylvania

- Date: November 6
- Game time: 8:20 pm. EST
- Game weather: 50 °F or 10 °C (Partly Cloudy)
- Game attendance: 64,851
- Referee: Walt Coleman
- TV announcers (NBC): Al Michaels, Cris Collinsworth and Michele Tafoya

Game information

First quarter

- BAL – Billy Cundiff 18 yd. Field Goal, Ravens 3–0

Second quarter

- PIT – Shaun Suisham 36 yd. Field Goal, Tied 3–3
- BAL – Billy Cundiff 43 yd. Field Goal, Ravens 6–3
- PIT – Shaun Suisham 30 yd. Field Goal, Tied 6–6
- BAL – Billy Cundiff 51 yd. Field Goal, Ravens 9–6

Third quarter

- BAL – Ray Rice 4 yd. run (Billy Cundiff kick), Ravens 16–6

Fourth quarter

- PIT – Rashard Mendenhall 1 yd. run (Shaun Suisham kick), Ravens 16–13
- PIT – Mike Wallace 25 yd. pass from Ben Rothlisberger (Shaun Suisham kick), Steelers 20–16
- BAL – Torrey Smith 26 yd. pass from Joe Flacco (Billy Cundiff kick), Ravens 23–20

Top passers

- BAL – Joe Flacco – 28/47, 300 yards, 1 TD
- PIT – Ben Roethlisberger – 20/37, 330 yards, 1 TD, 1 INT

Top rushers

- BAL – Ray Rice – 18 rushes, 43 yards, 1 TD
- PIT – Rashard Mendenhall – 13 rushes, 52 yards, 1 TD

Top receivers

- BAL – Anquan Boldin – 7 receptions, 88 yards
- PIT – Antonio Brown – 5 Receptions, 109 Yards

Top tacklers

- BAL – Lardarius Webb – 6 tackles
- PIT – James Harrison – 8 tackles

As in their previous match this year, the Ravens scored first with an 18-yard field goal by kicker Billy Cundiff, the only points scored in the first quarter by either team. Steelers kicker Shaun Suisham answered with a 36-yard field goal early in the second quarter, and a 30-yard field goal near the end, but both of these were quickly matched by Baltimore's Cundiff with a 43-yard and 51-yard field goal, respectively, giving Baltimore a 9–6 lead at halftime. The Ravens then increased their lead in the third quarter when Ray Rice scored the first touchdown of the game on a 4-yard run. The Steelers rallied in the fourth quarter, with running back Rashard Mendenhall making a 1-yard run to score a touchdown, and then taking the lead for the first time in the game when quarterback Ben Roethlisberger hit Mike Wallace in the endzone with a 25-yard pass for a second touchdown. During the game's final minutes the Ravens began a 92-yard drive, culminating in a 26-yard touchdown pass by quarterback Joe Flacco to wide receiver Torrey Smith leaving 8 seconds on the clock improving the Ravens’ record to 6–2.

==== Week 10: at Seattle Seahawks ====
Week Ten: Baltimore Ravens at Seattle Seahawks – Game summary

Quarter	1	2	3	4	Total
Ravens	0	7	3	7	17
Seahawks	10	9	3	0	22

at CenturyLink Field, Seattle, Washington

- Date: November 13
- Game time: 4:05 pm. EST/1:05 p.m. PST
- Game weather: 50 °F or 10 °C (Cloudy)
- Game attendance: 66,522
- Referee: Scott Green
- TV announcers (CBS): Greg Gumbel and Dan Dierdorf

Game information

First quarter

- SEA – Marshawn Lynch 1-yard run (Steven Hauschka kick), Seahawks 7–0
- SEA – Steven Hauschka 22-yard Field Goal, Seahawks 10–0

Second quarter

- BAL – Ed Dickson 1-yard pass from Ray Rice (Billy Cundiff kick), Seahawks 10–7
- SEA – Steven Hauschka 38-yard Field Goal, Seahawks 13–7
- SEA – Steven Hauschka 39-yard Field Goal, Seahawks 16–7
- SEA – Steven Hauschka 35-yard Field Goal, Seahawks 19–7

Third quarter

- SEA – Steven Hauschka 30-yard Field Goal, Seahawks 22–7
- BAL – Billy Cundiff 35-yard Field Goal, Seahawks 22–10

Fourth quarter

- BAL – Ed Dickson 11-yard pass from Joe Flacco (Billy Cundiff kick), Seahawks 22–17

Top passers

- BAL – Joe Flacco – 29/52, 255 yards, 1 touchdown, 1 interception
- SEA – Tarvaris Jackson – 17/27, 217 yards

Top rushers

- BAL – Ray Rice – 5 receptions, 27 yards
- SEA – Marshawn Lynch – 32 carries, 109 yards, 1 touchdown

Top receivers

- BAL – Ed Dickson – 10 receptions, 79 yards, 2 touchdowns
- SEA – Marshawn Lynch – 5 receptions, 58 yards

Top tacklers

- BAL – Haloti Ngata – 3 tackles, 8 assists
- SEA – David Hawthorne – 5 tackles, 2 assists

With this loss, the Ravens fell to 6–3.

==== Week 11: vs. Cincinnati Bengals ====
Week Eleven: Cincinnati Bengals at Baltimore Ravens – Game summary

Quarter	1	2	3	4	Total
Bengals	7	0	7	10	24
Ravens	0	14	10	7	31

at M&T Bank Stadium, Baltimore, Maryland

- Date: November 20
- Game time: 1:00 pm. EST
- Game weather: 67 °F or 19.4 °C (Partly Cloudy)
- Game attendance: 74,320
- Referee: Ron Winter
- TV announcers (CBS): Greg Gumbel and Dan Dierdorf

Game information

First quarter

- CIN – Cedric Benson 7-yard run (Mike Nugent kick), Bengals 7–0

Second quarter

- BAL – Anquan Bolden 35-yard pass from Joe Flacco (Billy Cundiff kick), Tied 7–7
- BAL – Ray Rice 1-yard run (Billy Cundiff kick), Ravens 14–7

Third quarter

- BAL – Billy Cundiff 22-yard Field Goal, Ravens 17–7
- CIN – Cedric Benson 3 run (Mike Nugent kick), Ravens 17–14
- BAL – Ray Rice 3-yard run (Billy Cundiff kick), Ravens 24–14

Fourth quarter

- BAL – Torrey Smith 38-yard pass from Joe Flacco (Billy Cundiff kick), Ravens 31–14
- CIN – Andre Caldwell 49-yard pass from Andy Dalton (Mike Nugent kick), Ravens 31–21
- CIN – Mike Nugent 27-yard Field Goal, Ravens 31–24

Top passers

- CIN – Andy Dalton – 24/45, 373 yards, 1 touchdown, 3 interceptions
- BAL – Joe Flacco – 17/27, 270 yards, 2 touchdowns, 1 interception

Top rushers

- CIN – Cedric Benson – 15 carries, 41 yards, 2 touchdowns
- BAL – Ray Rice – 20 carries, 104 yards, 2 touchdowns

Top receivers

- CIN – Jerome Simpson – 6 receptions, 152 yards
- BAL – Torrey Smith – 6 receptions, 165 yards, 1 touchdown

Top tacklers

- CIN – Adam Jones – 7 tackles
- BAL – Bernard Pollard – 7 tackles, 2 assists

With this win, the Ravens improved to 7–3.

==== Week 12: vs. San Francisco 49ers ====
Thanksgiving Day game

Week Twelve: San Francisco 49ers at Baltimore Ravens – Game summary

Quarter	1	2	3	4	Total
49ers	3	0	3	0	6
Ravens	3	3	0	10	16

at M&T Bank Stadium, Baltimore, Maryland

- Date: November 24
- Game time: 8:20 pm. EST
- Game weather: 53 °F or 11.7 °C (Clear)
- Game attendance: 71,345
- Referee: John Parry
- TV announcers (NFLN): Brad Nessler, Mike Mayock and Alex Flanagan

Game information

First quarter

- BAL – Billy Cundiff 39-yard field goal, Ravens 3–0. Drive: 10 plays, 55 yards, 4:39.
- SF – David Akers 45-yard field goal, Tied 3–3. Drive: 9 plays, 41 yards, 4:42.

Second quarter

- BAL – Billy Cundiff 23-yard field goal, Ravens 6–3. Drive: 6 plays, 60 yards, 3:24.

Third quarter

- SF – David Akers 52-yard field goal, Tied 6–6. Drive: 13 plays, 46 yards, 7:30.

Fourth quarter

- BAL – Dennis Pitta 8-yard pass from Joe Flacco (Billy Cundiff kick), Ravens 13–6. Drive: 16 plays, 76 yards, 7:34.
- BAL – Billy Cundiff 39-yard field goal, Ravens 16–6. Drive: 8 plays, 39 yards, 4:16.

Top passers

- SF – A. Smith 15-24 140 YDS, INT
- BAL – J. Flacco 161 YDS, 1 TD

Top rushers

- SF – F. Gore 14 CAR, 39 YDS
- BAL – R. Rice 21 CAR, 59 YDS

Top receivers

- SF – M. Crabtree 6 REC 54 YDS
- BAL – A. Boldin 4 REC 63 YDS

Top tacklers

- SF – N. Bowman 4 solo, 5 assists
- BAL – B. Pollard 6 solo, 2 assists

Coming off their divisional home win over the Bengals, head coach John Harbaugh and the Ravens stayed at home for a Week 12 interconference duel with the San Francisco 49ers and their head coach (John's brother) Jim Harbaugh, on Thanksgiving. (The game was jokingly nicknamed "The Harbaugh Bowl.")

Baltimore delivered the game's opening punch in the first quarter with a 39-yard field goal from kicker Billy Cundiff, but the 49ers answered with kicker David Akers getting a 45-yard field goal. The Ravens regained the lead in the second quarter with a 23-yard field goal from Cundiff.

San Francisco began the third quarter with Akers nailing a 52-yard field goal, yet Baltimore regained the lead in the fourth quarter with quarterback Joe Flacco finding tight end Dennis Pitta on an 8-yard touchdown pass, followed by a 39-yard field goal from Cundiff. Afterwards, the defense would hold to prevent any comeback attempt from the 49ers.

With this win, the Ravens improved to 8–3.

Linebacker Terrell Suggs (3 tackles, 3 sacks, & 1 forced fumble) was named NFL Network’s Puddin' Pie Award winner.

==== Week 13: at Cleveland Browns ====
Week Thirteen: Baltimore Ravens at Cleveland Browns – Game summary

Quarter	1	2	3	4	Total
Ravens	0	10	7	7	24
Browns	0	0	3	7	10

at Cleveland Browns Stadium, Cleveland, Ohio

- Date: December 4
- Game time: 4:05 pm. EST
- Game weather: 54 °F or 12.2 °C (Rain)
- Game attendance: 63,648
- Referee: Ed Hochuli
- TV announcers (CBS): Bill Macatee and Steve Tasker

Game information

First quarter

- No scoring plays

Second quarter

- BAL – Ray Rice 6-yard TD run (Billy Cundiff XP is good)
- BAL – Billy Cundiff 21-yard field goal

Third quarter

- CLE – Phil Dawson 21-yard field goal
- BAL – Ricky Williams 1-yard TD run (Billy Cundiff XP is good)

Fourth quarter

- BAL – Lardarius Webb 68-yard punt return (Billy Cundiff XP is good)
- CLE – Evan Moore 22-yard pass from Colt McCoy (Phil Dawson XP is good)

Top passers

- BAL – Joe Flacco – 10/23, 158 yards
- CLE – Colt McCoy – 17/35, 192 yards, 1 touchdown, 1 interception

Top rushers

- BAL – Ray Rice – 24 carries, 209 yards, 1 touchdown
- CLE – Peyton Hillis – 12 carries, 45 yards

Top receivers

- BAL – Ed Dickson – 3 receptions, 47 yards
- CLE –Chris Ogbonnaya – 5 receptions, 28 yards

Top tacklers

- BAL – Jameel McClain – 5 tackles, 2 assists
- CLE –D'Qwell Jackson – 8 tackles, 4 assists

The Ravens entered the game concerned that they would have trouble, having lost three matches in the year to teams with losing records on the road. This increased their determination. On their first possession, they came within field goal range on 4th and 1, and decided to attempt to convert, which failed. But on their next possession, Ray Rice scored a touchdown for a 7–0 lead. Billy Cundiff missed two moderate field goals in the first half, but toward the end, made one that increased the lead to 10–0. The Browns forced a fumble in the third quarter and capitalized on it with a field goal, cutting this lead to 10–3. But on the ensuing drive, Ray Rice, who rushed for over 200 yards in the entire game, had a 67-yard gain which led to a touchdown, increasing the lead to 17–3. They would later add to that cushion when Lardarius Webb returned a punt 68 yards for a touchdown. The Browns made one more touchdown, making what would be the final score of 24–10. But when the Ravens got their final possession, following the 2-minute warning, they were able to run out the clock as they won their seventh straight game over the Browns and improved to 9–3.

==== Week 14: vs. Indianapolis Colts ====
Week Fourteen: Indianapolis Colts at Baltimore Ravens – Game summary

Quarter	1	2	3	4	Total
Colts	0	3	0	7	10
Ravens	10	7	7	0	24

at M&T Bank Stadium, Baltimore, Maryland

- Date: December 11
- Game time: 1:00 pm. EST
- Game weather: 43 °F or 6.1 °C (Sunny)
- Game attendance: 71,187
- Referee: Clete Blakeman
- TV announcers (CBS): Bill Macatee and Steve Tasker

Game information

First quarter

- BAL – Torrey Smith 8 yd. pass from Joe Flacco (Billy Cundiff kick), Ravens 7–0
- BAL – Billy Cundiff 36 yd. Field Goal, Ravens 10–0

Second quarter

- BAL – Ray Rice 6 yd. run (Billy Cundiff kick), Ravens 17–0
- IND – Adam Vinateri 22 yd. Field Goal, Ravens 17–3

Third quarter

- BAL – Dennis Pitta 7 yd. pass from Joe Flacco, Ravens 24–3

Fourth quarter

- IND – Jacob Tamme 13 yd. pass from Dan Orlovsky(Adam Vinateri kick), Ravens 24–10

Top passers

- IND – Dan Orlovsky – 17/37, 136 yards, 1 touchdown, 1 interception
- BAL – Joe Flacco – 23/31, 227 yards, 2 touchdown, 1 interception

Top rushers

- IND – Donald Brown – 9 carries, 28 yards
- BAL – Ray Rice – 26 carries, 103 yards, 1 touchdown

Top receivers

- IND – Pierre Garçon – 5 receptions, 46 yards
- BAL – Ray Rice – 6 receptions, 46 yards

Top tacklers

- IND – Antoine Bethea – 5 tackles, 6 assists
- BAL – Jameel McClain – 6 tackles, 1 assist

With this win, the Ravens improved to 10–3.

==== Week 15: at San Diego Chargers ====
Week Fifteen: Baltimore Ravens at San Diego Chargers – Game summary

Quarter	1	2	3	4	Total
Ravens	0	7	0	7	14
Chargers	7	10	14	3	34

at Qualcomm Stadium, San Diego, California

- Date: December 18
- Game time: 8:20 pm. EST/5:20 pm. PST
- Game weather: 58 °F or 14.4 °C (Cloudy)
- Game attendance: 67,242
- Referee: Carl Cheffers
- TV announcers (NBC): Al Michaels, Cris Collinsworth and Michele Tafoya

Game information

First quarter

Second quarter

Third quarter

Fourth quarter

Top passers

- BAL –
- SD –

Top rushers

- BAL –
- SD –

Top receivers

- BAL –
- SD –

Top tacklers

- BAL –
- SD –

With this loss, the Ravens fell to 10–4.

==== Week 16: vs. Cleveland Browns ====
Week Sixteen: Cleveland Browns at Baltimore Ravens – Game summary

Quarter	1	2	3	4	Total
Browns	0	0	7	7	14
Ravens	10	7	3	0	20

at M&T Bank Stadium, Baltimore, Maryland

- Date: December 24
- Game time: 1:00 pm. EST
- Game weather: 44 °F or 6.7 °C (Partly Cloudy)
- Game attendance: 71,083
- Referee: Walt Coleman
- TV announcers (CBS): Spero Dedes and Rich Gannon

Game information

First quarter

Second quarter

Third quarter

Fourth quarter

Top passers

- CLE –
- BAL –

Top rushers

- CLE –
- BAL –

Top receivers

- CLE –
- BAL –

Top tacklers

- CLE –
- BAL –

With their 8th-straight win over the Browns, the Ravens improved to 11–4.

==== Week 17: at Cincinnati Bengals ====
Week Seventeen: Baltimore Ravens at Cincinnati Bengals – Game summary

Quarter	1	2	3	4	Total
Ravens	10	7	0	7	24
Bengals	3	0	7	6	16

at Paul Brown Stadium, Cincinnati, Ohio

- Date: January 1
- Game time: 4:15 pm. EST
- Game weather: 40 °F or 4.4 °C (Cloudy & Windy)
- Game attendance: 63,439
- Referee: Tony Corrente
- TV announcers (CBS): Ian Eagle & Dan Fouts

Game information

First quarter

- BAL – Ray Rice 70 yd. run (Billy Cundiff run), Ravens 7–0
- BAL – Billy Cundiff 42 yd. Field Goal, Ravens 10–0
- CIN – Mike Nugent 46 yd. Field Goal, Ravens 10–3

Second quarter

- BAL – Dennis Pitta 9 yd. pass from Joe Flacco (Billy Cundiff kick), Ravens 17–3

Third quarter

- CIN – Bernard Scott 25 yd. run (Mike Nugent kick), Ravens 17–10

Fourth quarter

- CIN – Mike Nugent 23 yd. Field Goal, Ravens 17–13
- BAL – Ray Rice 51 yd. run (Billy Cundiff kick), Ravens 24–13
- CIN – Mike Nugent 46 yd. Field Goal, Ravens 24–16

Top passers

- BAL – Joe Flacco – 15/19, 130 yards, 1 touchdown
- CIN – Andy Dalton – 22/44, 232 yards

Top rushers

- BAL – Ray Rice – 24 carries, 191 yards, 2 touchdowns
- CIN – Cedric Benson – 13 carries, 51 yards

Top receivers

- BAL – Dennis Pitta – 6 receptions, 62 yards, 1 touchdown
- CIN – Jermaine Gresham – 5 receptions, 72 yards

Top tacklers

- BAL – Ray Lewis – 5 tackles, 2 assists
- CIN – Domata Peko – 3 tackles, 3 assists

Ray Rice took over the offensive by totaling 191 rushing yards and two long touchdowns on 24 carries in the Ravens' victory that closed out the regular season at 12–4 and the team clinched first division crown since 2006. Rice's touchdown runs came on rushes of 70 and 51 yards and for the effort he was named the AFC's offensive player of the week by the NFL. The Ravens also set records such as going 6–0 against division rivals and winning their 8th-straight division rival game as they swept the Bengals for the first time since 2008. From here, the Ravens would then play six of their next nine Week 17 games against the Bengals, losing five straight before finally defeating them in 2020.

=== Postseason ===
Playoff round	Date	Opponent (seed)	Result	Record	Venue	Recap
Wild Card	First-round bye					
Divisional	January 15	Houston Texans (3)	W 20–13	1–0	M&T Bank Stadium	Recap
AFC Championship	January 22	at New England Patriots (1)	L 20–23	1–1	Gillette Stadium	Recap

==== AFC Divisional Playoffs: vs. (3) Houston Texans ====
AFC Divisional Playoffs: (3) Houston Texans at (2) Baltimore Ravens – Game summary

Quarter	1	2	3	4	Total
Texans	3	10	0	0	13
Ravens	17	0	0	3	20

at M&T Bank Stadium, Baltimore, Maryland

- Date: January 15
- Game time: 1:00 p.m. EST
- Game weather: 31 °F (−1 °C), sunny
- Game attendance: 71,547
- Referee: Pete Morelli
- TV announcers (CBS): Greg Gumbel (play-by-play) and Dan Dierdorf (color commentator)
- Recap

Game information

1st quarter

- HOU – Neil Rackers 40-yard field goal, 12:24. Texans 3–0. Drive: 5 plays, 20 yards, 2:36
- BAL – Kris Wilson 1-yard pass from Joe Flacco (Billy Cundiff kick), 9:51. Ravens 7–3. Drive: 3 plays, 2 yards, 1:21
- BAL – Billy Cundiff 48-yard field goal, 6:02. Ravens 10–3. Drive: 6 plays, 30 yards, 2:47
- BAL – Anquan Boldin 10-yard pass from Joe Flacco (Billy Cundiff kick), 1:08. Ravens 17–3. Drive: 5 plays, 34 yards, 2:05

2nd quarter

- HOU – Neil Rackers 33-yard field goal, 11:42. Ravens 17–6. Drive: 11 plays, 59 yards, 4:26
- HOU – Arian Foster 1-yard run (Neil Rackers kick), 4:48. Ravens 17–13. Drive: 12 plays, 86 yards, 5:49

3rd quarter

- None

4th quarter

- BAL – Billy Cundiff 44-yard field goal, 2:52. Ravens 20–13. Drive: 10 plays, 45 yards, 4:29

Leading passers

- HOU – T. J. Yates – 17/35, 184 yards, 3 INT
- BAL – Joe Flacco – 14/27, 176 yards, 2 TD

Leading rushers

- HOU – Arian Foster – 27 rushes, 132 yards, TD
- BAL – Ray Rice – 21 rushes, 60 yards

Leading receivers

- HOU – Andre Johnson – 8 rec, 111 yards
- BAL – Anquan Boldin – 4 rec, 73 yards, TD

After a 60-yard return on the opening kick-off, the Texans drove the ball to the Baltimore 21 where they settled for a 40 field goal and took an early 3–0 lead. The Ravens go three and out and punt the ball back to Houston, but Texans punt returner Jacoby Jones misplays the punt and the Ravens recover inside the Houston 5-yard line. Joe Flacco would hit tight end Kris Wilson (his first catch of the season) for a touchdown and the Ravens took a lead they would never surrender. Baltimore dominated Houston's passing game, intercepting rookie quarterback T. J. Yates 3 times and held the Texans scoreless in the second half. The Ravens committed no penalties during the game and never turned the ball over by fumble or interception. Arian Foster ran for 132 yards, the first 100-yard plus performance ever against the Ravens in post season. After the game, Foster and Ray Lewis exchanged game jerseys.

==== AFC Championship: at (1) New England Patriots ====
AFC Championship: (2) Baltimore Ravens at (1) New England Patriots – Game summary

Quarter	1	2	3	4	Total
Ravens	0	10	10	0	20
Patriots	3	10	3	7	23

at Gillette Stadium, Foxborough, Massachusetts

- Date: January 22
- Game time: 3:00 pm. EST
- Game weather: 29 °F (−2 °C), cloudy and cold
- Game attendance: 68,756
- Referee: Alberto Riveron
- TV announcers (CBS): Jim Nantz (play-by-play), Phil Simms (color commentator), and Steve Tasker (sideline reporter)
- Recap

Game information

1st quarter

- NE – Stephen Gostkowski 29-yard field goal, 5:49. Patriots 3–0. Drive: 13 plays, 50 yards, 5:20

2nd quarter

- BAL – Billy Cundiff 20-yard field goal, 14:21. Tied 3–3. Drive: 8 plays, 67 yards, 4:20
- NE – BenJarvus Green-Ellis 7-yard run (Stephen Gostkowski kick), 10:35. Patriots 10–3. Drive: 10 plays, 75 yards, 3:46
- BAL – Dennis Pitta 6-yard pass from Joe Flacco (Billy Cundiff kick), 6:03. Tied 10–10. Drive: 8 plays, 80 yards, 4:32
- NE – Stephen Gostkowski 35-yard field goal, 3:00. Patriots 13–10. Drive: 10 plays, 63 yards, 3:03

3rd quarter

- NE – Stephen Gostkowski 24-yard field goal, 9:06. Patriots 16–10. Drive: 14 plays, 74 yards, 5:54
- BAL – Torrey Smith 29-yard pass from Joe Flacco (Billy Cundiff kick), 3:38. Ravens 17–16. Drive: 11 plays, 78 yards, 5:28
- BAL – Billy Cundiff 39-yard field goal, 0:50. Ravens 20–16. Drive: 6 plays, 7 yards, 2:36

4th quarter

- NE – Tom Brady 1-yard run (Stephen Gostkowski kick), 11:29. Patriots 23–20. Drive: 11 plays, 63 yards, 4:21

Leading passers

- BAL – Joe Flacco – 22/36, 306 yards, 2 TD, INT
- NE – Tom Brady – 22/36, 239 yards, 2 INT

Leading rushers

- BAL – Ray Rice – 21 rushes, 67 yards
- NE – BenJarvus Green-Ellis – 15 rushes, 68 yards, TD

Leading receivers

- BAL – Anquan Boldin – 6 rec, 101 yards
- NE – Rob Gronkowski – 5 rec, 87 yards

With the loss, the Ravens finished their season with a 13–5 record preventing them from reaching their first Super Bowl in 11 years. Lee Evans, who only recorded four receptions all regular season, failed to catch a potential game-winning touchdown on 2nd & 1, as he dropped the pass. Billy Cundiff then missed a 32-yard field goal with 0:11 left in regulation, which would have sent the game into overtime.

== Division standings ==
AFC North
	W	L	T	PCT	DIV	CONF	PF	PA	STK
^{(2)} Baltimore Ravens	12	4	0	.750	6–0	9–3	378	266	W2
^{(5)} Pittsburgh Steelers	12	4	0	.750	4–2	9–3	325	227	W2
^{(6)} Cincinnati Bengals	9	7	0	.563	2–4	6–6	344	323	L1
Cleveland Browns	4	12	0	.250	0–6	3–9	218	307	L6

== Awards ==
- Defensive Player of the Year Terrell Suggs.
