= Roosevelt Blackmon =

American football player (born 1974)

No. 23, 37
- Position: Cornerback

Personal information
- Born: September 10, 1974 (age 52); Pahokee, Florida, U.S.
- Listed height: 6 ft 1 in (1.85 m)
- Listed weight: 185 lb (84 kg)

Career information
- High school: Glades Central (Belle Glade, Florida)
- College: Morris Brown (1994–1997)
- NFL draft: 1998: 4th round, 121st overall pick

Career history
- Green Bay Packers (1998); Cincinnati Bengals (1998–1999); BC Lions (2001)*; Dallas Desperados (2002)*
- * Offseason or practice squad member only

Career NFL statistics
- Tackles: 18
- Interceptions: 1
- Passes defended: 4
- Stats at Pro Football Reference

Roosevelt Blackmon III (born September 10, 1974) is an American former professional football player who was a cornerback for two seasons in the National Football League (NFL). He played college football for the Morris Brown Wolverines and was selected by the Green Bay Packers in the fourth round of the 1998 NFL draft. He split the 1998 season with the Packers and the Cincinnati Bengals before playing the 1999 season with the Bengals. Blackmon later was a member of the BC Lions of the Canadian Football League (CFL) and the Dallas Desperados of the Arena Football League (AFL). After his playing career, he served as a high school coach.

== Early life ==
Blackmon was born on September 10, 1974, in Pahokee, Florida, but grew up in nearby Belle Glade. His father was nicknamed "Frog", leading to Blackmon receiving the nickname "Tadpole". In seventh grade, he failed to make his middle school football team and instead served as a trainer, which Blackmon said meant water boy. Although he was successful in making the team the next year, he saw limited action and only caught one pass, which was a 42-yard touchdown. Blackmon attended Glades Central High School but was not allowed to play football until his senior year. Weighing 98 pounds (44 kg) as a freshman and 120 pounds (54 kg) as a sophomore, he was told by coaches that he was not big enough to play football.

Blackmon served as the team's trainer until he was finally successful in making the team as a senior after increasing his weight to 155 pounds (70 kg). A wide receiver, he was named second-team all-area in his lone season, but had no college teams that sent him scholarship offers. After high school, he decided to attend Bethune–Cookman University.

== College career ==
Blackmon only attended Bethune–Cookman for a semester before returning home. For eight months, he worked as a gravedigger and used car salesman, while continuing to train in football. He said, "A lot of times it was 95 to 98 degrees, and the dirt is hard. It was a challenge to get the grave dug." After eight months, he decided he would try to play college football at Morris Brown College for the Wolverines, as his cousin was a student there. According to The Post-Crescent, "Blackmon bought a bus ticket and showed up on campus, much to the surprise of the team's coach, since it was too late to enroll for the fall semester". Unable to enroll, he "begged to be the assistant equipment manager" and gained this position, serving as waterboy and handling "towels [and] balls". In addition to serving as assistant equipment manager, Blackmon also worked night shifts for the supermarket chain Winn-Dixie, "working from 11 p.m. to 7 a.m. each day".

While serving as assistant equipment manager, Blackmon practiced in drills with the football team. He was able to enroll at Morris Brown in January 1994 and later walked-on to the football team as a defensive back, quickly winning a starting role. During his freshman year in 1994, Blackmon recorded five interceptions and returned one for an 88-yard touchdown. He posted his first two interceptions, as well as two fumble recoveries, in his first game. He later was put on scholarship and also joined Morris Brown's track and field team as a sprinter, earning All-America honors in 1996 and 1997 while placing top six in the 100 metres at the NCAA Division II championships. During the 1996 football season, Blackmon also served as the team's return specialist and in a 16–8 win over Alabama A&M, he had two punt return touchdowns, both 87 yards long, on back-to-back punts. He also had a 95-yard interception return touchdown during the 1996 season. Blackmon was a first-team All-American return specialist and an All-Southern Intercollegiate Athletic Conference (SIAC) selection at cornerback for his junior year.

Blackmon suffered a hairline fracture in his back in the first game of his senior year but returned after a five-game absence, serving as a key player in several of their victories. During the season, Morris Brown won five of six games in which Blackmon played, while they lost four of five games in which he was inactive. One of his coaches said, "He's meant the difference between W's and L's. Besides his leadership, he's a guy who is going to make something happen. Having him out there means you're going to shut down one side in the secondary. His ability to return punts is a bonus. The kid is special." At the conclusion of his collegiate career, he competed at the 1998 Senior Bowl, where he impressed against many players from the NCAA Division I level. Across his four years playing for Morris Brown, Blackmon posted thirteen interceptions and had eight touchdowns.

== Professional career ==
Prior to the 1998 NFL draft, Blackmon was, along with eventual first-overall pick Peyton Manning, one of two subjects of an NFL Films documentary, depicting "a classic rags-to-riches story in Blackmon and the media darling story in Manning". He ended up being selected by the Green Bay Packers in the fourth round (121st overall) of the draft. The Green Bay Press-Gazette noted that he had "the tangibles the Packers seek in their cornerbacks", citing his size of 6 feet 1 inch (1.85 m) and his ability to run the 40-yard dash in under 4.5 seconds, while the paper noted that what he needed to improve on was "experience and polish". Prior to the regular season, he suffered a turf toe injury. Nevertheless, Blackmon made the final roster and appeared in the first three games of the 1998 season for the Packers, recording no statistics while the team won each game. However, he was waived by the Packers on September 30.

One day after his waiving by the Packers, Blackmon was claimed off waivers by the Cincinnati Bengals. He appeared in 12 games for the Bengals as a special teams player, recording no statistics. The 1998 Bengals compiled a record of 3–13. Blackmon returned for the 1999 season. In preseason, he also practiced as a wide receiver; his ability to play there as well as at cornerback and on special teams led teammates to nickname him "Jim Thorpe". After being inactive for three of the first four games in 1999, he saw playing time at cornerback due to injuries in the Bengals' Week 5 game against the Cleveland Browns, recording an interception which helped them win 18–17. Blackmon started for the first time in his NFL career the next week against the Pittsburgh Steelers, recording a pass deflection which prevented a touchdown. He started the next two games, including being tasked with covering future Pro Football Hall of Famer Marvin Harrison against the Indianapolis Colts, but suffered a severe sprained ankle and then did not appear in any games the rest of the season, officially being placed on injured reserve on December 24. In five games played, three as a starter, Blackmon tallied 18 tackles and four pass deflections, while the Bengals compiled a record of 4–12. He was released by the Bengals on August 14, 2000, prior to the 2000 regular season.

In April 2001, Blackmon signed with the BC Lions of the Canadian Football League (CFL), although he later left the team before the regular season. He signed with the Dallas Desperados of the Arena Football League (AFL) on March 14, 2002, but then was released four days later. Blackmon concluded his NFL career with 20 games played, three as a starter, while posting 18 tackles, four pass deflections and an interception.

== Later life ==
During the 1999 offseason, Blackmon established a children's football camp in his hometown. After his football career, he served as an assistant football coach at Glades Central until being promoted to head coach in 2011. He served three seasons in that position and compiled a record of 25–12, with an appearance in the Class 5A regional finals in his first season. He did not return as football coach in 2014, but remained with the school as track and field coach. Blackmon later became a defensive assistant for the football team at Oxbridge Academy in 2017.
