= Chykie Brown =

American football player (born 1986)

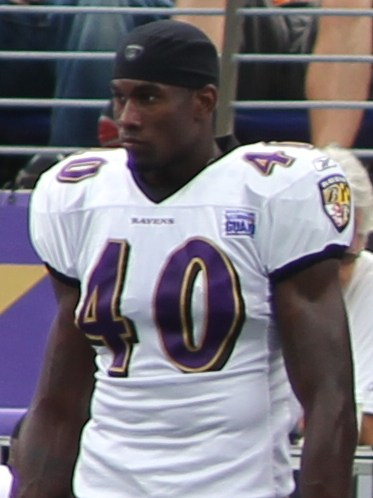
- Brown with the Baltimore Ravens in 2011

No. 23, 39
- Position: Cornerback

Personal information
- Born: December 26, 1986 (age 39); Houston, Texas, U.S.
- Listed height: 5 ft 11 in (1.80 m)
- Listed weight: 191 lb (87 kg)

Career information
- High school: North Shore (Houston)
- College: Texas
- NFL draft: 2011: 5th round, 164th overall pick

Career history
- Baltimore Ravens (2011–2014); New York Giants (2014); Cincinnati Bengals (2016)

Awards and highlights
- Super Bowl champion (XLVII)

Career NFL statistics
- Total tackles: 80
- Pass deflections: 9
- Stats at Pro Football Reference

Chykie Jerrod Brown (born December 26, 1986) is an American former professional football player who was a cornerback in the National Football League (NFL). He was selected by the Baltimore Ravens in the fifth round of the 2011 NFL draft. He played college football for the Texas Longhorns.

== Early life ==
Brown was an all-state high school player who played at multiple positions - safety, cornerback, running back and wide receiver; was a two-time all-district athlete, and earned three letters. He was selected to the first-team 5A all-state team by The Associated Press and Texas Sports Writers Association in his Senior season in high school. He also was selected to the first-team all-district team. He finished high school with a total of 120 tackles, 10 interceptions, and 4 forced fumbles. Brown is a 2006 graduate of North Shore High School, where he was an honor roll student.

== College career ==
Brown played college football for head coach Mack Brown at the University of Texas at Austin in Austin, Texas, from 2007-2010. He red-shirted as a freshman. In four seasons as a player he appeared in 47 career games, starting 29. College career stats include 106 tackles (71 solo), two INTs, four QB sacks, and two forced fumbles. In 2007 he helped the team win the Holiday Bowl and finish ranked #10. The next year he helped the Longhorns to win a share of the Big 12 South Championship and then the Fiesta Bowl. In his junior year, he helped the team win the Big 12 Championship and go to the 2010 BCS National Championship Game which they lost to Alabama, finishing the season ranked #2.

== Professional career ==
Pre-draft measurables
Height	Weight	Arm length	Hand span	Wingspan	40-yard dash	10-yard split	20-yard split	20-yard shuttle	Three-cone drill	Vertical jump	Broad jump
5 ft 11 1/4 in (1.81 m)	190 lb (86 kg)	33 7/8 in (0.86 m)	8 3/4 in (0.22 m)	6 ft 6 5/8 in (2.00 m)	4.37 s	1.54 s	2.47 s	4.00 s	6.50 s	39.5 in (1.00 m)	10 ft 0 in (3.05 m)
All values from NFL Combine/Pro Day

=== Baltimore Ravens ===
Brown was selected in the fifth round (164 overall) in the 2011 NFL draft by the Baltimore Ravens.

In the 2011 season, Brown saw very little playing time and ended the year with seven total tackles and one pass defensed.

Brown saw slightly more playing time in the 2012 season due to season-ending ACL injury to Lardarius Webb, ending the regular season with 25 total tackles and 5 passes defensed. In the first quarter of the AFC Divisional playoff game against the top-seeded Denver Broncos, Brown broke up a Peyton Manning pass intended for Eric Decker that Corey Graham returned for a touchdown. The Ravens went on to win the game 38–35 in double overtime and defeated the San Francisco 49ers in Super Bowl XLVII three weeks later, earning Brown a Super Bowl ring.

In the 2013 season, Brown mostly played on special teams and ended the year with ten tackles. He was released on November 4, 2014.

=== New York Giants ===
Brown was signed off waivers by the New York Giants on November 5, 2014. On September 5, 2015, he was cut by the Giants.

=== Cincinnati Bengals ===
On February 8, 2016, Brown signed a future contract with the Cincinnati Bengals. On September 3, 2016, he was released by the Bengals but was re-signed the next day. He was placed on injured reserve on November 28, 2016, after being carted off with a knee injury in Week 12.
