= Rashaad Duncan =

American football player (born 1986)

No. 45
- Position: Defensive tackle

Personal information
- Born: December 10, 1986 (age 39); Belle Glade, Florida
- Listed height: 6 ft 2 in (1.88 m)
- Listed weight: 315 lb (143 kg)

Career information
- High school: Glades Central (Belle Glade, Florida)
- College: Pittsburgh
- NFL draft: 2009: undrafted

Career history
- Tampa Bay Buccaneers (2009)*; Carolina Panthers (2009)*; Buffalo Bills (2009–2010)*; Jacksonville Sharks (2010)*; Washington Redskins (2010–2011)*; Jacksonville Sharks (2012–2014)
- * Offseason or practice squad member only

Career NFL statistics
- Tackles: --
- Sacks: --
- Forced fumbles: --
- Stats at Pro Football Reference

Career AFL statistics
- Tackles: 24
- Sacks: 11
- Forced fumbles: 3
- Stats at ArenaFan.com

Rashaad Khimbrel Lawrence Duncan (born December 10, 1986) is an American former professional football defensive tackle. He was signed by the Tampa Bay Buccaneers as an undrafted free agent in 2009. He played college football at Pittsburgh.

He was also a member of the Carolina Panthers, Buffalo Bills, Jacksonville Sharks, and Washington Redskins.

== Early life ==
Duncan was born in Belle Glade, Florida and played high school football at Glades Central High School. As a senior, he compiled 62 tackles, 16 tackles for losses and nine quarterback sacks and the team finished 10-1, advancing to the regional finals of the Florida 3A playoffs. He was named All-Palm Beach County, All-Western Conference, and was selected to play in the Outback Steakhouse All-Star Game. As an All-Florida Class 3A second-team honoree, Duncan helped lead Glades Central to undefeated regular seasons each of his last two years.

Duncan also participated in baseball and track and field.

== College career ==
Duncan played in 48 consecutive games over his last four years at Pitt and was named the Defensive Line MVP in 2008 by the coaching staff. He compiled 55 tackles and 1.5 sacks as a senior.

Duncan graduated Pittsburgh with a degree in Administration of Justice.

== Professional career ==
Duncan was signed by the Tampa Bay Buccaneers as an undrafted free agent on May 1, 2009. He was signed to the practice squad on September 7, 2009 and was released on October 13, 2009. He was then signed to the Carolina Panthers' practice squad on October 20, 2009 and was released on October 27, 2009. Duncan was signed to the Buffalo Bills’ practice squad on December 1, 2009.

Duncan was signed to the Washington Redskins' practice squad on December 22, 2010. He was waived on July 30, 2011.
