= Lakeside Academy (Belle Glade) =

School in Florida, United States

Coordinates: 26.6779°N 80.6704°W

Information
- Established: 1998
- Closed: 2016
- Grades: K-6

Lakeside Academy Charter School was established in 1998 in Belle Glade, Florida, by Barbara Litinski. It closed in 2016. The school served a predominantly underprivileged K-6 student population from the Glades area of Palm Beach County.
