= Johnnie Dixon (defensive back) =

American gridiron football player (born 1988)

No. 21, 28
- Positions: Defensive back, linebacker

Personal information
- Born: December 11, 1988 (age 37); Belle Glade, Florida, U.S.
- Listed height: 6 ft 0 in (1.83 m)
- Listed weight: 190 lb (86 kg)

Career information
- High school: Glades Central (Belle Glade)
- College: Pearl River
- NFL draft: 2010: undrafted

Career history
- Calgary Stampeders (2010–2011); Toronto Argonauts (2012); Alabama Hammers (2015); Saskatchewan Roughriders (2016)*
- * Offseason or practice squad member only

Awards and highlights
- Grey Cup champion (2012)

Career CFL statistics
- Tackles: 21
- Sacks: 0
- Interceptions: 0
- Stats at CFL.ca (archived)

Johnnie Dixon (born December 11, 1988) is an American former professional football defensive back. He signed as a free agent with the Toronto Argonauts on October 30, 2012. Dixon was a member of the 100th Grey Cup winning team. He also played college football for the Pearl River Community College Wildcats.

On May 29, 2013, Dixon retired from the CFL.
