= James Lee (offensive lineman) =

American football player (born 1985)

No. 77
- Position: Offensive tackle

Personal information
- Born: August 17, 1985 (age 41); Belle Glade, Florida, U.S.
- Listed height: 6 ft 4 in (1.93 m)
- Listed weight: 305 lb (138 kg)

Career information
- High school: Glades Central (Belle Glade)
- College: South Carolina State
- NFL draft: 2008: undrafted

Career history
- Cleveland Browns (2008)*; Tampa Bay Buccaneers (2008–2011); Washington Redskins (2012)*; Saskatchewan Roughriders (2013); Ottawa Redblacks (2014)*
- * Offseason or practice squad member only

Career NFL statistics
- Games played: 18
- Games started: 9
- Stats at Pro Football Reference
- Stats at CFL.ca (archive)

James Lee (born August 17, 1985) is an American former professional football player who was an offensive tackle in the National Football League (NFL) and Canadian Football League (CFL). He was signed by the Cleveland Browns as an undrafted free agent in 2008. He played college football for the South Carolina State Bulldogs.

Lee was also a member of the Tampa Bay Buccaneers, Washington Redskins, Saskatchewan Roughriders, and Ottawa Redblacks.

== Professional career ==
=== Cleveland Browns ===
Lee signed with the Cleveland Browns on April 29, 2008. He was waived on August 30, 2008.

=== Tampa Bay Buccaneers ===
On September 1, 2008, Lee signed with the Tampa Bay Buccaneers. He was waived on September 5, 2008 and signed to the team's practice squad the next day. Lee was promoted to the 53-man active roster on October 27, 2008.

On July 29, 2011, Lee re-signed with the Buccaneers as a restricted free agent.

=== Washington Redskins ===
Lee was signed by the Washington Redskins on April 9, 2012 as an unrestricted free agent. He was released on August 27.

=== Saskatchewan Roughriders ===
Lee played in one game, a start, for the Saskatchewan Roughriders of the Canadian Football League (CFL) in 2013.

=== Ottawa Redblacks ===
Lee later signed with the Ottawa Redblacks of the CFL. He was released on June 21, 2014.
