= Damien Berry =

American football player (born 1989)

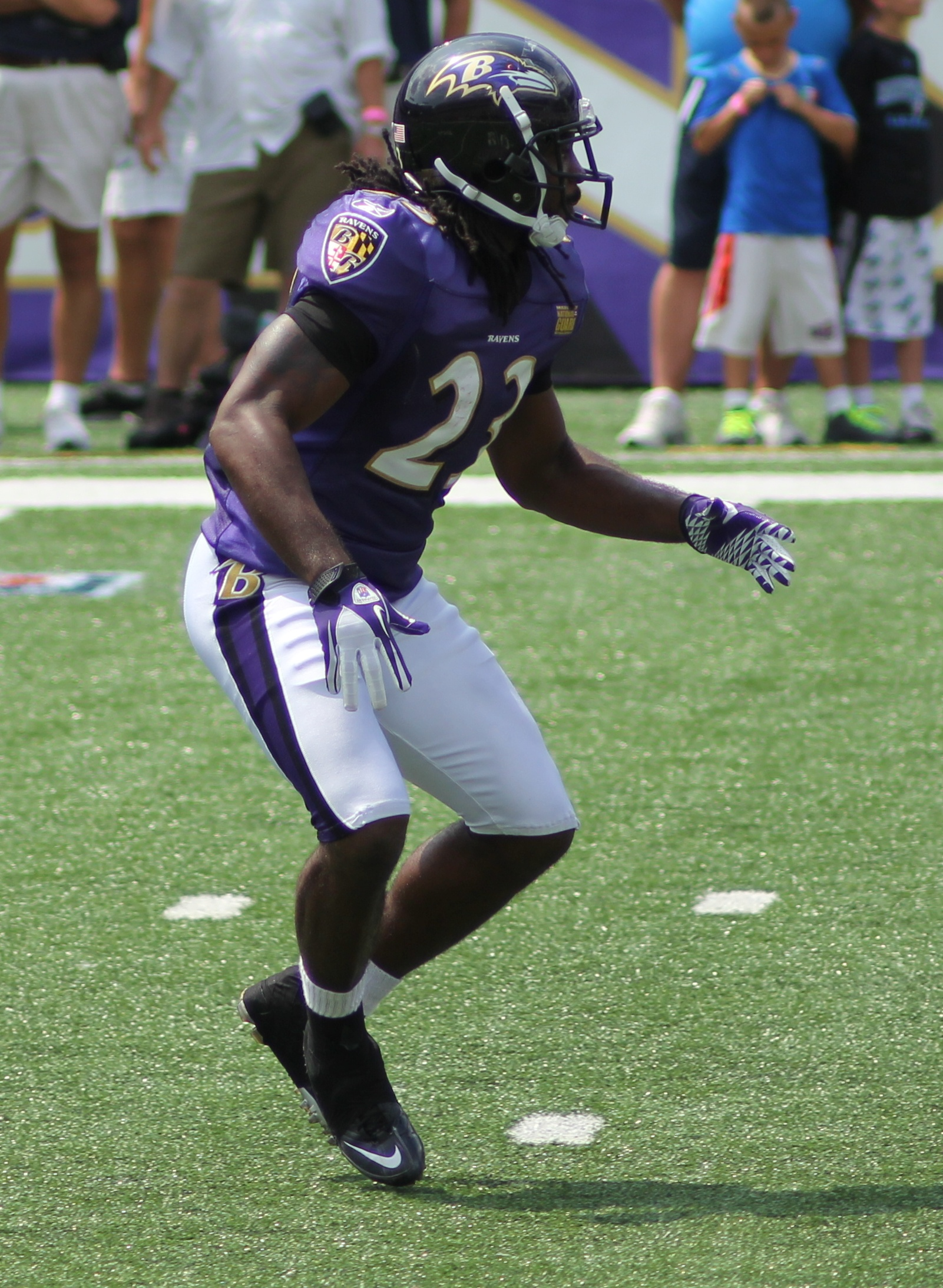
- Berry during practice at M&T Bank Stadium in 2011

No. 30, 23, 28
- Position: Running back

Personal information
- Born: October 21, 1989 (age 37); Belle Glade, Florida, U.S.
- Listed height: 5 ft 10 in (1.78 m)
- Listed weight: 223 lb (101 kg)

Career information
- High school: Glades Central (Belle Glade)
- College: Miami
- NFL draft: 2011: undrafted

Career history
- Baltimore Ravens (2011−2013)*
- * Offseason or practice squad member only

Awards and highlights
- Super Bowl champion (XLVII); Second-team All-ACC (2010); Hurricane Media "Good Guy" Award (2010)
- Stats at Pro Football Reference

Damien Berry (born October 21, 1989) is an American former professional football player who was a running back in the National Football League (NFL). He played college football for the Miami Hurricanes, leading the team in rushing and earning second-team All-Atlantic Coast Conference (ACC) honors in 2010. He was signed by the Ravens as an undrafted free agent in 2011.

== Early life ==
Damien Berry was born in 1989 at Belle Glade, Florida. His father, Kenny Berry, played college football for the Miami Hurricanes from 1987 to 1989. Berry attended Suncoast High School where he played running back and safety, though he was mainly used as a safety. As a sophomore for Suncoast, Berry had four interceptions, more than 500 rushing yards, and 300 more all-purpose yards, and finished the season with 14 touchdowns. As a junior, Berry rushed for 530 yards and five touchdowns to go along with three interceptions on defense. As a senior, Berry transferred to Glades Central High School, where he rushed for 1,080 yards and 19 touchdowns. Despite suffering a torn anterior cruciate ligament (ACL), Berry played through the injury as a senior and helped lead Glades Central to a state title. He later had surgery to repair tears in the meniscus and ACL.

Berry was recruited as a safety and was rated the No. 7 safety prospect and the No. 14 player in Florida by Rivals.com. He was also ranked No. 9 player in Florida by the Orlando Sentinel.

== College career ==
Berry saw action in all 12 games as a freshman. He played only on special teams in the first 11 games, registering three solo tackles and five tackle assists. He played safety in the season finale against Boston College, registering one solo tackle.

Berry was moved to running back his sophomore season. He played in seven games on the kickoff cover team and recorded three tackles.

In March 2009, Berry secured a spot for himself when he rushed for 124 yards, including a 54-yard touchdown run, during Miami's annual spring game.

As a junior, Berry rushed for a career-high 162 yards against the Florida A&M. Interviewed after the game, Berry gave the credit to his offensive line: "Everything went great, and, I mean, yeah, that's thanks to my O-line." He became a fan favorite as Miami supporters "rhythmically chanted" his last name ("Berry, Berry, Berry ...") when he entered games. Asked in November 2009 about whether he lacked the moves to shake defenders, Berry replied:

"If you're not a defensive lineman or a legit linebacker, I'm going to run through you. When I look up and see nothing but one guy (in front of him), I'm going through him. ... They say I can't shake (defenders). I got moves, but why use it when you don't need it? I'm more of a power back. I'd rather run straight through you than try to run around you."

During the 2009 season, Berry rushed for 616 yards, averaging 6.6 yards per carry, and led the Hurricanes with eight touchdowns.

In October 2010, Berry became one of only five running backs in Miami Hurricanes history to have three consecutive 100-yard rushing games. The other four are Damien Berry is carrying the football with such brute force, he joined Willis McGahee, Edgerrin James, Clinton Portis, and Frank Gore. He added a fourth consecutive 100-yard rushing performance the following week. Despite injury problems, Berry rushed for 899 yards during the 2010 season. He was Miami's leading rusher in 2010, was selected as a second-team All-ACC player.

== Professional career ==
=== Baltimore Ravens ===
Berry was signed by the Baltimore Ravens as an undrafted free agent in 2011. Berry was assigned No. 23 by the Ravens, the same number worn by Willis McGahee, another Miami Hurricanes running back who went on to play for the Ravens. After receiving the jersey, Berry told reporters, "It was a total surprise. I came in and they had No. 23 in my locker. I'm proud to wear it. I'm definitely going to represent for Willis and try to build on what he left here."

On August 25, 2013, he was waived by the Ravens.
