= Glades Central High School =

Glades Central Community High School

Location
- 1001 SW Ave M Belle Glade, Palm Beach, Florida 33430; United States; 26.669238°N 80.681241°W

Information
- School type: Public secondary
- Opened: 1970
- Status: Open
- School district: Palm Beach County School District
- Principal: Melanie Bolden-Morris
- Teaching staff: 51.00 (FTE)
- Grades: 9–12
- Enrollment: 869 (2023–2024)
- Student to teacher ratio: 17.04
- Colors: Maroon and Gold
- Nickname: Raiders
- Rival: Pahokee Blue Devils
- Website: gchs.palmbeachschools.org

Glades Central Community High School is a high school in Belle Glade, Florida. In the 2014–15 school year, its enrollment numbered 992 students. The school is a football powerhouse. In 2001, The New York Times reported that Glades Central had produced more current National Football League players than any other high school in the country with 7 during the 2001 season. The school has a football rivalry with fellow powerhouse Pahokee High School.

Belle Glade High School opened in 1943. It was whites only. Golden Rams were the mascot. Black students attended Lake Shore High School. Bobcats were the mascot.

The Raiders have won six Florida High School football titles, tying for the second most in state history with Lakeland and University Christian. Their main rivals are the Pahokee Blue Devils. The Blue Devils play the Raiders each year in the so-called "Muck Bowl," one of the most famous high school rivalry games in the nation, which can draw up to 25,000 spectators each year. Glades Central has won 17 out of the 25 games since 1995.

In 2024 its 868 students were 61 percent black, 36 percent hispanic and 2 percent white. Most students were from economically disadvantaged families.

The student body has been predominantly black. Students come from African American, Jamaican and Haitian backgrounds. Bryan Mealer wrote the 2012 book Muck City about the school, its football history, and community.

The area has been struck by devastating hurricanes.

Alumnus Omar Haugabook, a police officer and former Troy University quarterback, became head football coach in 2024. He had been interim head coach.

== Athletics ==
The football team plays on Effie C. Grear Field. Grear was the school's principal.

The Lawrence E. Will Museum held an exhibit on football stars from the school.

== Notable football players from Glades Central High School ==
- Reidel Anthony – NFL wide receiver, Tampa Bay Buccaneers, Washington Redskins
- Brad Banks – CFL quarterback, Winnipeg Blue Bombers, 2002 Heisman Trophy runner-up
- Kelvin Benjamin – NFL wide receiver, Carolina Panthers, Buffalo Bills
- Travis Benjamin – NFL wide receiver, Cleveland Browns, Los Angeles Chargers, Miami Hurricanes
- Damien Berry – NFL running back, Baltimore Ravens
- Roosevelt Blackmon – NFL defensive back, Green Bay Packers, Cincinnati Bengals
- Jatavis Brown - NFL linebacker, Los Angeles Chargers
- Johnnie Dixon – CFL defensive back, Calgary Stampeders
- Rashaad Duncan – NFL defensive end, Tampa Bay Buccaneers, Carolina Panthers, Buffalo Bills
- Jessie Hester – NFL wide receiver, Florida State Seminoles and NFL's St. Louis Rams, Indianapolis Colts, Atlanta Falcons, Los Angeles Raiders
- Santonio Holmes – NFL wide receiver, Pittsburgh Steelers, New York Jets, Chicago Bears, Super Bowl MVP
- James Jackson – NFL running back, Cleveland Browns, Green Bay Packers, Arizona Cardinals
- Cre'Von LeBlanc – NFL defensive back, Philadelphia Eagles
- James Lee – NFL offensive tackle, Tampa Bay Buccaneers
- Ray McDonald – NFL defensive lineman, New England Patriots
- Louis Oliver – defensive back, Miami Dolphins, Cincinnati Bengals
- Davius Richard – college football quarterback, North Carolina Central Eagles
- Johnny Rutledge – NFL linebacker, Arizona Cardinals, Denver Broncos
- Jimmy Spencer – NFL defensive back, New Orleans Saints, Cincinnati Bengals, San Diego Chargers, Denver Broncos
- Fred Taylor – NFL running back, Jacksonville Jaguars (selected to 2008 Pro Bowl), New England Patriots
- Deonte Thompson – NFL wide receiver, Buffalo Bills
- Clive Walford – NFL tight end, Oakland Raiders
- Rhondy Weston – NFL defensive tackle, Tampa Bay Buccaneers
