= Louis Oliver =

American football player (born 1966)

No. 25, 29
- Position: Safety

Personal information
- Born: March 9, 1966 (age 60); Belle Glade, Florida, U.S.
- Listed height: 6 ft 2 in (1.88 m)
- Listed weight: 224 lb (102 kg)

Career information
- High school: Glades Central (Belle Glade)
- College: Florida
- NFL draft: 1989: 1st round, 25th overall pick

Career history
- Miami Dolphins (1989–1993); Cincinnati Bengals (1994); Miami Dolphins (1995–1996)

Awards and highlights
- Second-team All-Pro (1992); Consensus All-American (1988); First-team All-American (1987); 2× First-team All-SEC (1987, 1988); University of Florida Athletic Hall of Fame

Career NFL statistics
- Total tackles: 544
- Sacks: 2
- Forced fumbles: 4
- Fumble recoveries: 8
- Interceptions: 27
- Defensive touchdowns: 2
- Stats at Pro Football Reference

Louis Oliver, III (born March 9, 1966) is an American former professional football player who was a safety for eight seasons in the National Football League (NFL) during the 1980s and 1990s. Oliver played college football for the Florida Gators, earning All-American honors twice. He was a first-round pick in the 1989 NFL draft, and played professionally for the Miami Dolphins and the Cincinnati Bengals of the NFL.

== Early life ==
Oliver was born in Belle Glade, Florida in 1966. He attended Glades Central High School in Belle Glade, and was a standout high school football player for the Glades Central Raiders. Memorably, Oliver blocked two punts in the same game as a junior.

== College career ==
After graduating from high school, Oliver attended the University of Florida in Gainesville, Florida, where he was a walk-on player on head coach Galen Hall's Florida Gators football team in 1985. Subsequently, Oliver not only earned an athletic scholarship, he became a starting free safety and team captain, and totaled 11 career interceptions. He was a first-team All-Southeastern Conference (SEC) selection in 1987 and 1988, a first-team All-American in 1987 and a consensus first-team All-American in 1988, and a two-time SEC Academic Honor Roll honoree. Oliver was also the recipient of the Gators' Fergie Ferguson Award recognizing the "senior football player who displays outstanding leadership, character and courage."

Oliver graduated from Florida with a bachelor's degree in criminal justice in 1989, and was inducted into the University of Florida Athletic Hall of Fame as a "Gator Great" in 2000. In one of a series of articles written for The Gainesville Sun in 2006, the Sun sports editors chose him as No. 24 among the greatest 100 Gators from the first century of Florida football.

== Professional career ==
Oliver was selected by the Miami Dolphins in the first round (25th overall) of the 1989 NFL Draft. He played seven seasons for the Dolphins (1989–1993, 1995–1996) and one season for the Cincinnati Bengals (1994). Oliver was reunited in the Dolphins' defensive backfield with his former Gators teammate Jarvis Williams, and the pair were the Dolphins' starting safeties for the next five seasons. Arguably Oliver's greatest career highlight was an October 4, 1992 interception of a pass thrown by Buffalo Bills quarterback Jim Kelly, which he returned 103 yards for a touchdown, and is the longest interception return in Dolphins history. With two additional interceptions on that day, Oliver set the record for the most interception return yards in a single NFL game with 170 yards, which remains the most as of 2025 (the second most in history, if the AFL is included).

During his eight-year NFL career, Oliver played in 117 regular season games, started 101 of them, and recorded 544 tackles and 27 interceptions, two of which he returned for touchdowns.

== See also ==
- 1987 College Football All-America Team
- 1988 College Football All-America Team
- Florida Gators football, 1980–89
- List of Florida Gators football All-Americans
- List of Florida Gators in the NFL draft
- List of Miami Dolphins first-round draft picks
- List of Miami Dolphins players
- List of University of Florida alumni
- List of University of Florida Athletic Hall of Fame members
