= Eagle Academy (Belle Glade, Florida) =

Coordinates: 26°43′19″N 80°39′50″W

Location
- 33800 State Road 80; Belle Glade, Palm Beach County, Florida; United States

Information
- Age: 13 to 16

Eagle Academy is a behavior modification facility. The facility is located on 33800 State Road 80, Belle Glade, Florida. The academy featured in the show High School Boot Camp.

The target group is "at-risk" girls and boys between 13 and 16 years of age. They have to be resident in Palm Beach County. They also need to have no felonies on their police record.

== Discipline ==
Eagle Academy strictly enforces discipline: a button not done up, a word out of place or any non conformity could result in 10 push-ups or 20 jumping jacks or more, depending on the infraction.

The program claims to have helped about 80 percent of the detainees to lead a productive life.

According to the new budget of 2013, The Eagle Academy was closed, saving $4.5M a year.

== In the news ==
One of the drill instructors was arrested for aggressively handling a student. Another staff member was arrested and charged of trying to cover up the incident.

In February 2008, in a separate incident, another staff member was charged with abuse.

In August 2008, a January 2008 graduate was shot while driving a stolen car.

January–June 2010 students DeLaney, Gousse and Dew were the first to ever perform music that was written at the academy, DeLaney being the first to ever have a guitar there.
