= Belle Glade, Florida =

- City
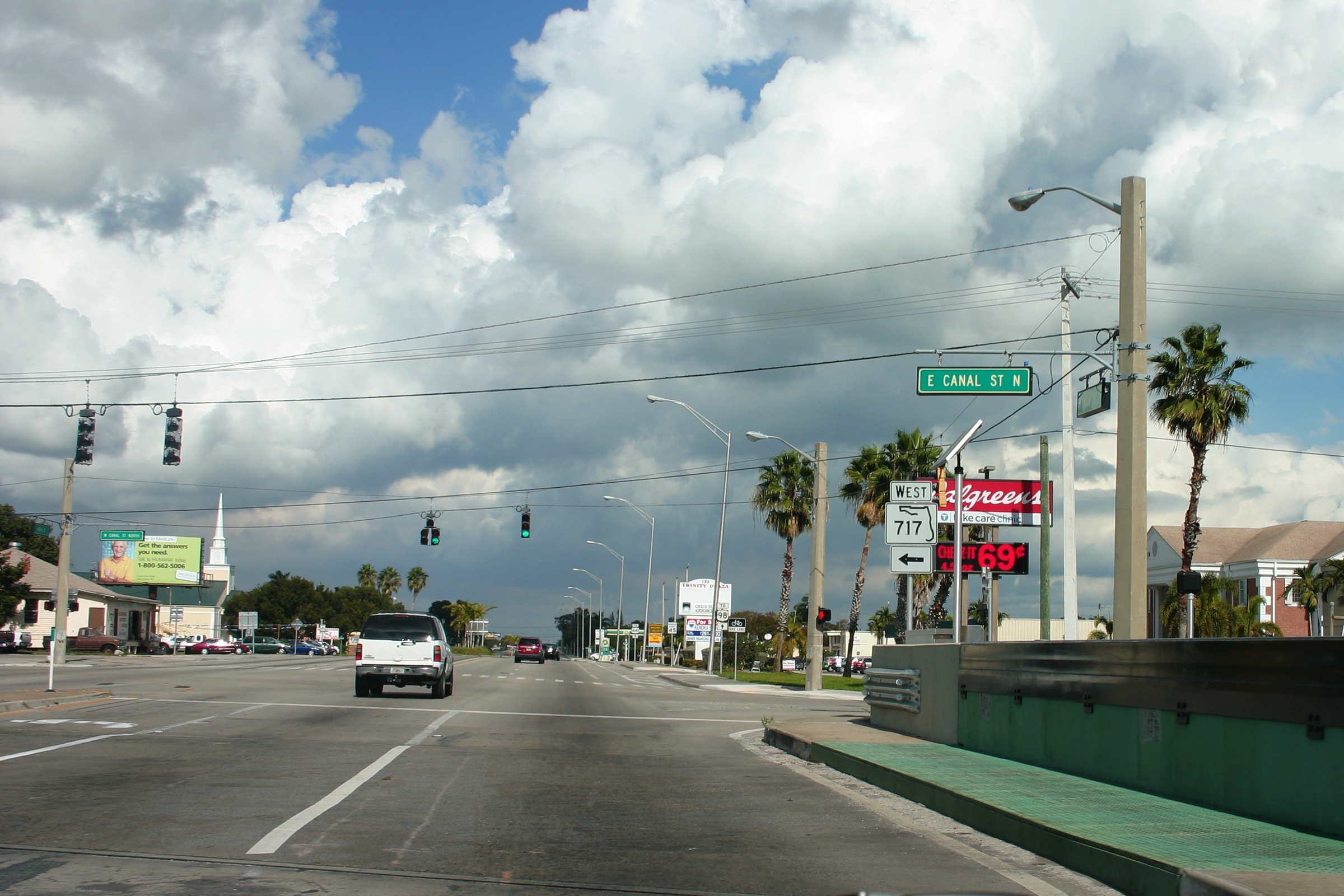
- Main Street in Belle Glade

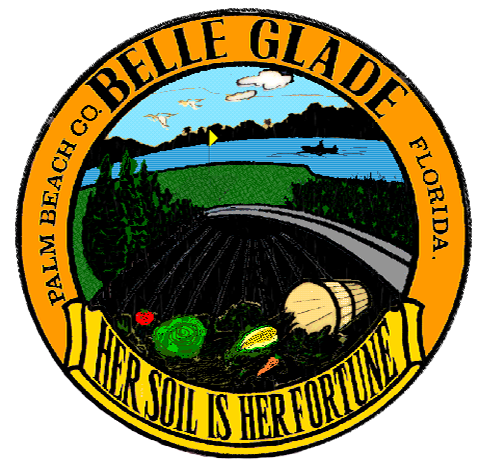
- Seal
- Nickname: Muck City
- Motto: Her Soil is Her Fortune
- Location of Belle Glade in Florida
- Coordinates: 26°41′34″N 80°38′35″W
- Country: United States
- State: Florida
- County: Palm Beach
- Settled (Hillsboro Settlement): c. 1912–April 8, 1928
- Incorporated (Town of Belle Glade): April 9, 1928
- Incorporated (City of Belle Glade): September 11, 1945

Government
  - Type: Commissioner-Manager

Area
  - Total: 7.03 sq mi (18.21 km^{2})
  - Land: 6.97 sq mi (18.06 km^{2})
  - Water: 0.058 sq mi (0.15 km^{2})
- Elevation: 13 ft (4.0 m)

Population (2020)
  - Total: 16,698
  - Density: 2,394.9/sq mi (924.66/km^{2})
- Time zone: UTC-5 (Eastern (EST))
  - Summer (DST): UTC-4 (EDT)
- ZIP code: 33430
- Area codes: 561, 728
- FIPS code: 12-05200
- GNIS feature ID: 2403837
- Website: http://www.bellegladegov.com/

Belle Glade is a city in south-central Florida in the far western part of Palm Beach County, Florida, United States, on the southeastern shore of Lake Okeechobee. It is part of the Miami metropolitan area of South Florida. As of the 2020 census, Belle Glade had a population of 16,698.

Belle Glade (and the surrounding area) is sometimes referred to as "Muck City" due to the large quantity of muck, in which sugarcane grows, found in the area. Despite being located in the South Florida region of the state, Belle Glade is culturally more associated with the Florida Heartland.

For a time during the early to mid 1980s, the city had the highest rate of AIDS infection per capita (37 cases in a population of roughly 19,000) in the United States. According to the FBI, in 2003, the city had the second highest violent crime rate in the country at 298 per 10,000 residents. In 2010, the Palm Beach County Sheriff's Office estimated that half of the young men in Belle Glade between the ages of 18 and 25 had felony convictions.

== History ==
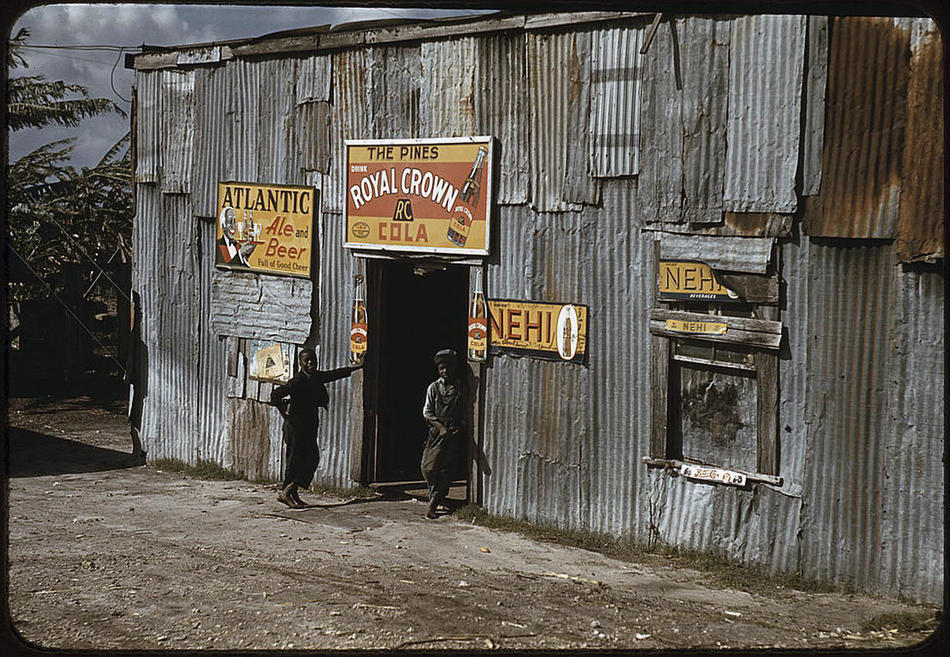
African American migratory workers by a juke joint in Belle Glade, 1941. Photo by Marion Post Wolcott.

=== Pre-historic ===
The Belle Glade or Okeechobee culture was an archaeological culture that extended around Lake Okeechobee and included the lower Kissimmee River valley. It existed from as early as 1000 BCE until about 1700 CE. The culture is named for the Belle Glade site, which was excavated in the mid-1930s as part of a Civil Works Administration project. The Belle Glade site included a midden and a burial mound.

=== Settlement ===
The town of Belle Glade was founded during the Florida land boom of the 1920s. During that period, there were a series of efforts made to put in place drainage systems to reclaim dry land from the Everglades, including land around Lake Okeechobee. It was hoped that the reclaimed acreage could be put to better use, including agriculture. In 1921 the Florida legislature established an agricultural research station at Belle Glade to study methods of growing crops on reclaimed Everglades land. At that time, there were already 16 settlements on and around Lake Okeechobee, inhabited by around 2,000 people.

A settlement, originally named Hillsboro, was built at what is now Belle Glade in 1925. In 1926 the Florida East Coast Railway extended its system to Belle Glade, which helped the town's development.

=== 1928 hurricane ===
A powerful hurricane struck the area on September 16, 1928. The storm winds caused Lake Okeechobee to overflow its banks, inundating towns around the lake and causing widespread damage in Belle Glade. According to figures compiled by the Florida Department of Health, the storm killed 611 people in Belle Glade alone, and a total of over 1,800 statewide. Contemporary accounts stated that most of the dead were Black migrant farmworkers, a "large percentage" of whom were believed to be from the Bahamas. Belle Glade was rebuilt, and a large dike was erected to protect towns around the lake from storm-driven overflows.

=== World War II ===
German prisoners of war were confined in camps located at Belle Glade and nearby Clewiston during World War II.

=== HIV/AIDS ===
In the early 1980s, researchers began to notice a large number of people with AIDS in Belle Glade. The disease had first been identified by doctors in New York and California in 1981, and it was largely associated with communities of gay men in and around large cities. In Belle Glade, however, people with AIDS mainly identified as heterosexual, and around half were women. Some researchers, and notably Dr. Mark Whiteside and Dr. Carolyn MacLeod of the Institute of Tropical Medicine, in Miami, hypothesized that AIDS in Belle Glade might be connected to poverty and poor living conditions in the city's "colored town," where many people diagnosed with the disease also lived. Their theory, along with the very high per capita AIDS rate in Belle Glade, brought notoriety to the town as the "AIDS capital of the world." Whiteside and MacLeod's theory turned out to be incorrect, but subsequent research conducted in Belle Glade shaped scientific knowledge about the transmission of HIV, the virus that causes AIDS, through heterosexual sex.

=== In recent years ===
Today, the area around Lake Okeechobee is fertile and farming is an important industry. Sugar cane and vegetables are grown.

Migrant farmworkers are an important part of the labor force. Belle Glade received national attention when a 1960 CBS television documentary, Harvest of Shame, graphically depicted the local migrant farmerworkers' daily existence and working conditions.

Men and women still gather around 5 a.m. in the same lot you see at the beginning of Harvest of Shame, waiting for buses to take them to the fields. The "loading ramp," as it's called, is a bleak, empty lot, surrounded by some small buildings with bars on the windows and a boarded up storefront.

As of May 2014 the city has plans "to demolish the loading ramp and turn it into a park."

The town is known for its football tradition, and together with nearby Pahokee has "sent at least 60 players to the National Football League".

== Geography ==
According to the United States Census Bureau, the city has a total area of 4.7 square miles (12 km^{2}), of which 4.7 square miles (12 km^{2}) are land and 0.21% is water.

=== Climate ===
Climate data for Belle Glade, Florida, 1991–2020 normals, extremes 1924–2006
Month	Jan	Feb	Mar	Apr	May	Jun	Jul	Aug	Sep	Oct	Nov	Dec	Year
Record high °F (°C)	90 (32)	92 (33)	93 (34)	95 (35)	99 (37)	98 (37)	100 (38)	99 (37)	97 (36)	96 (36)	91 (33)	89 (32)	100 (38)
Mean daily maximum °F (°C)	75.9 (24.4)	78.7 (25.9)	81.7 (27.6)	86.0 (30.0)	89.2 (31.8)	91.1 (32.8)	92.3 (33.5)	92.3 (33.5)	90.8 (32.7)	87.3 (30.7)	81.4 (27.4)	77.9 (25.5)	85.4 (29.7)
Daily mean °F (°C)	63.9 (17.7)	65.9 (18.8)	69.3 (20.7)	73.2 (22.9)	77.5 (25.3)	80.9 (27.2)	82.4 (28.0)	82.5 (28.1)	81.4 (27.4)	77.3 (25.2)	70.8 (21.6)	66.7 (19.3)	74.3 (23.5)
Mean daily minimum °F (°C)	51.8 (11.0)	53.1 (11.7)	56.9 (13.8)	60.5 (15.8)	65.9 (18.8)	70.7 (21.5)	72.4 (22.4)	72.7 (22.6)	72.0 (22.2)	67.3 (19.6)	60.1 (15.6)	55.6 (13.1)	63.3 (17.4)
Record low °F (°C)	21 (−6)	27 (−3)	27 (−3)	33 (1)	44 (7)	54 (12)	62 (17)	61 (16)	60 (16)	39 (4)	32 (0)	24 (−4)	21 (−6)
Average precipitation inches (mm)	2.27 (58)	1.90 (48)	3.03 (77)	2.14 (54)	4.55 (116)	9.49 (241)	7.01 (178)	8.63 (219)	7.29 (185)	4.26 (108)	2.55 (65)	2.10 (53)	55.22 (1,402)
Average precipitation days (≥ 0.01 in)	9.1	7.3	7.6	7.6	8.6	16.2	17.0	17.1	17.5	11.7	7.7	7.8	135.2
Source 1: NOAA
Source 2: XMACIS2

== Demographics ==
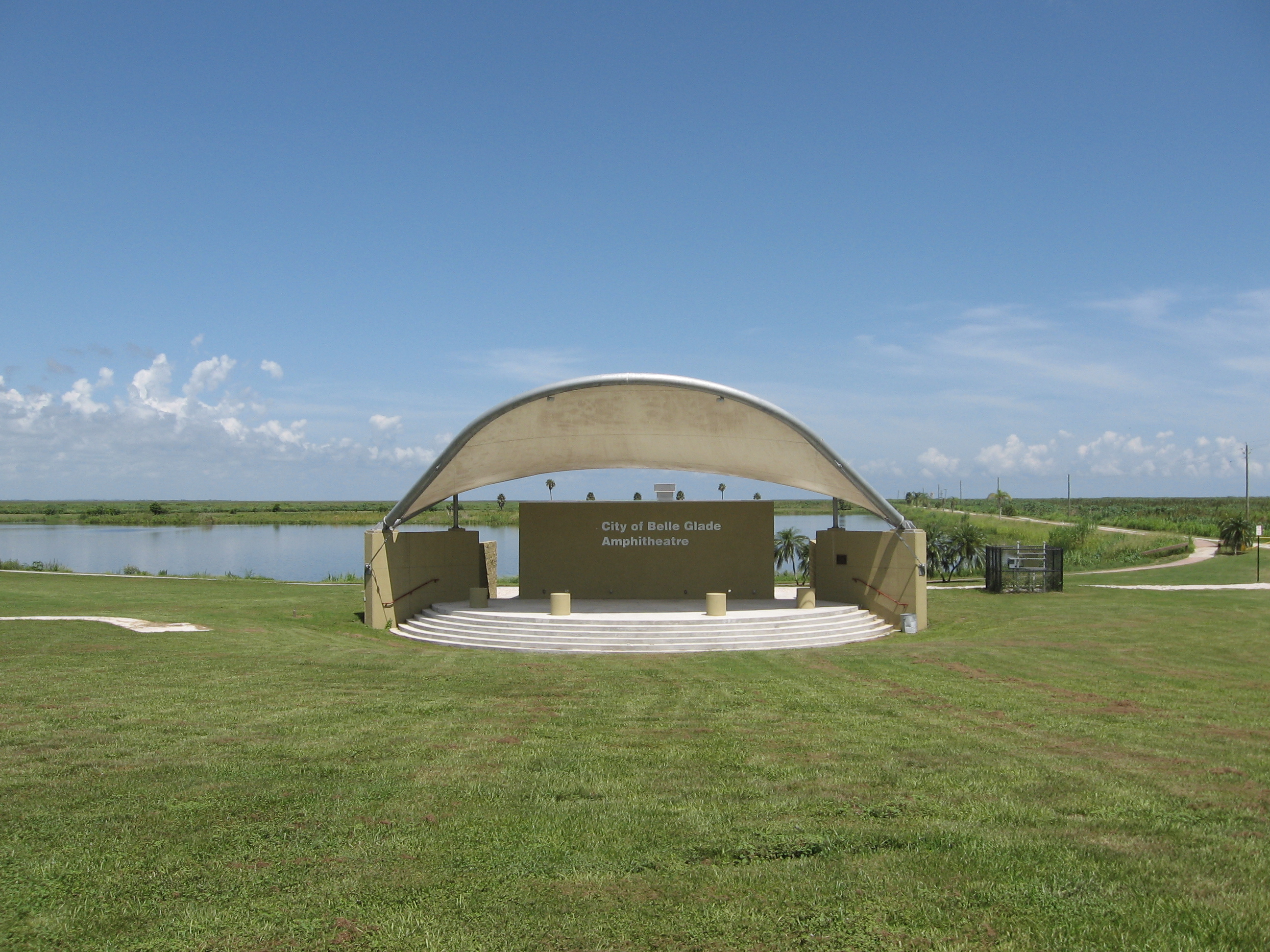
Belle Glade Amphitheater

Historical population
Census	Pop.	Note	%±
1930	926		—
1940	3,806		311.0%
1950	7,219		89.7%
1960	11,273		56.2%
1970	15,949		41.5%
1980	16,535		3.7%
1990	16,177		−2.2%
2000	14,906		−7.9%
2010	17,467		17.2%
2020	16,698		−4.4%
U.S. Decennial Census

=== Racial and ethnic composition ===
Belle Glade city, Florida – Racial and ethnic composition Note: the US Census treats Hispanic/Latino as an ethnic category. This table excludes Latinos from the racial categories and assigns them to a separate category. Hispanics/Latinos may be of any race.
Race / Ethnicity (NH = Non-Hispanic)	Pop 2000	Pop 2010	Pop 2020	% 2000	% 2010	% 2020
White alone (NH)	2,058	1,540	1,091	13.81%	8.82%	6.53%
Black or African American alone (NH)	7,471	9,716	9,432	50.12%	55.62%	56.49%
Native American or Alaska Native alone (NH)	23	9	3	0.15%	0.05%	0.02%
Asian alone (NH)	27	79	77	0.18%	0.45%	0.46%
Native Hawaiian or Pacific Islander alone (NH)	6	1	3	0.04%	0.01%	0.02%
Other race alone (NH)	30	10	31	0.20%	0.06%	0.19%
Mixed race or Multiracial (NH)	1,181	133	259	7.92%	0.76%	1.55%
Hispanic or Latino (any race)	4,110	5,979	5,802	27.57%	34.23%	34.75%
Total	14,906	17,467	16,698	100.00%	100.00%	100.00%

=== 2020 census ===
As of the 2020 census, Belle Glade had a population of 16,698. The median age was 35.5 years. 27.3% of residents were under the age of 18 and 14.9% of residents were 65 years of age or older. For every 100 females there were 96.8 males, and for every 100 females age 18 and over there were 94.9 males age 18 and over.

96.8% of residents lived in urban areas, while 3.2% lived in rural areas.

There were 5,837 households in Belle Glade, of which 38.6% had children under the age of 18 living in them. Of all households, 34.3% were married-couple households, 23.4% were households with a male householder and no spouse or partner present, and 34.5% were households with a female householder and no spouse or partner present. About 27.2% of all households were made up of individuals and 11.0% had someone living alone who was 65 years of age or older.

There were 6,623 housing units, of which 11.9% were vacant. The homeowner vacancy rate was 1.4% and the rental vacancy rate was 4.3%.

=== 2020 ACS estimates ===
The 2020 American Community Survey 5-year estimates reported 4,052 families residing in the city.

=== 2010 census ===
As of the 2010 United States census, there were 17,467 people, 5,832 households, and 3,879 families residing in the city.

=== 2000 census ===
In 2000, 39.0% had children under the age of 18 living with them, 40.9% were married couples living together, 22.0% had a female householder with no husband present, and 29.3% were non-families. 23.3% of all households were made up of individuals, and 6.1% had someone living alone who was 65 years of age or older. The average household size was 3.04 and the average family size was 3.62.

In 2000, the population was spread out, with 33.5% under the age of 18, 10.0% from 18 to 24, 27.1% from 25 to 44, 20.7% from 45 to 64, and 8.7% who were 65 years of age or older. The median age was 30 years. For every 100 females, there were 103.5 males. For every 100 females age 18 and over, there were 102.6 males.

In 2000, the median income for a household in the city was $22,715, and the median income for a family was $26,756. Males had a median income of $26,232 versus $21,410 for females. The per capita income for the city was $11,159. About 28.5% of families and 32.9% of the population were below the poverty line, including 41.1% of those under age 18 and 21.4% of those age 65 or over.

As of 2000, speakers of English as a first language accounted for 61.03% of all residents, while Spanish as a mother tongue consisted of 26.87%, Haitian Creole comprised 11.00%, and French made up 1.07% of the population.

As of 2000, Belle Glade had the tenth highest percentage of Haitian residents in the United States, at 11.50% of the populace. It also had the sixtieth highest percentage of Cuban residents nationally, at 5.98% of the population.

== Economy ==
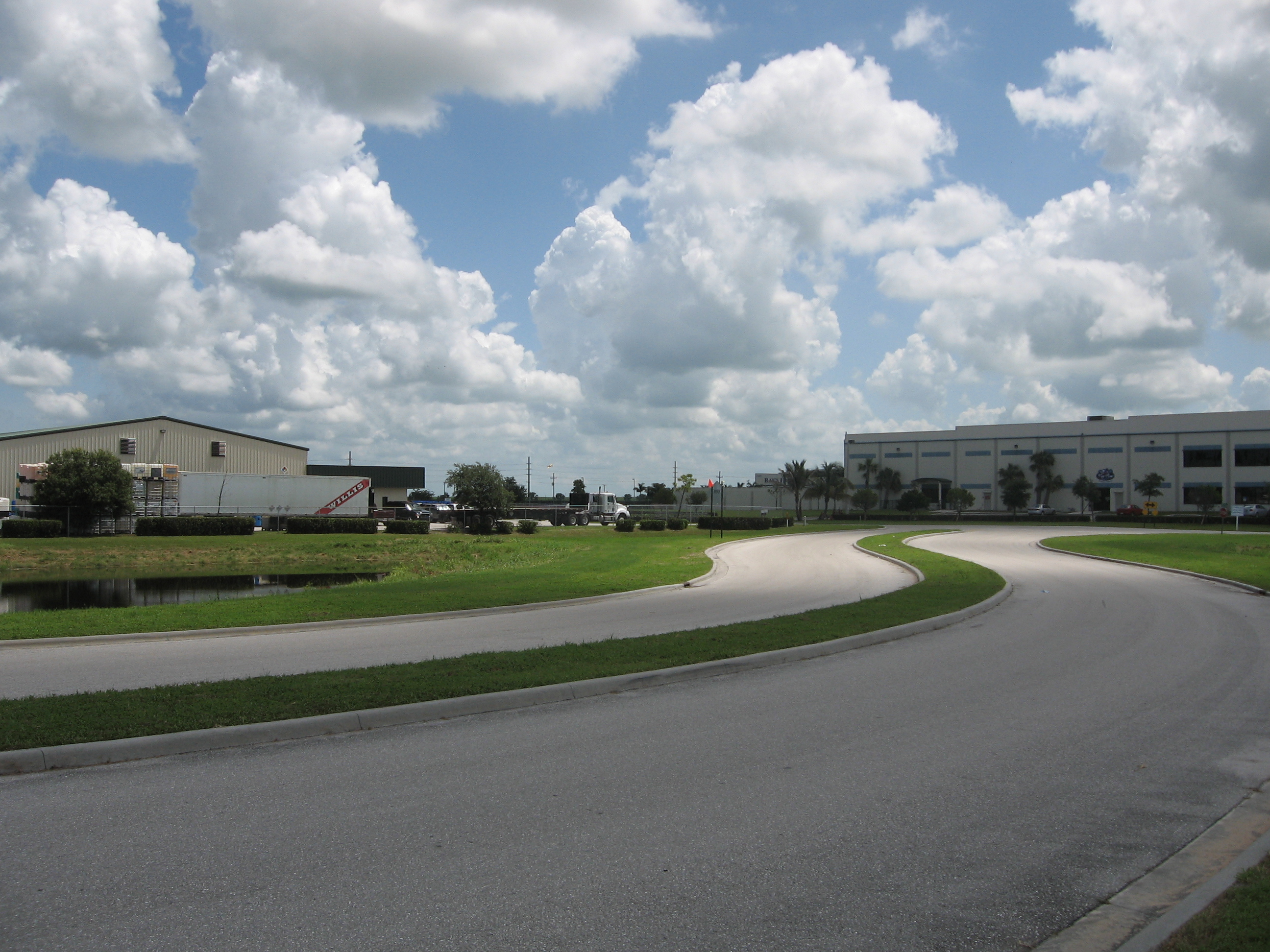
Belle Glade Industrial Park

The cane sugar mill of the "Sugar Cane Growers Cooperative" (SCGC) is located at Belle Glade. During the crop season the factory employs 550 people.

As of Feb. 2013, the official unemployment rate was about 15%; however, the town's mayor suggested the actual unemployment rate was closer to 40%. The number of jobs available locally dropped as local agriculture shifted from vegetables to sugarcane, a more highly mechanized crop.

The United States Postal Service operates the Belle Glade Post Office.

The Florida Department of Corrections operated the Glades Correctional Institution in an unincorporated area in Palm Beach County near Belle Glade. It was founded in 1932, employed about 350, had a capacity of 918 inmates and was scheduled for closure in December 2011.

== Parks and recreation ==
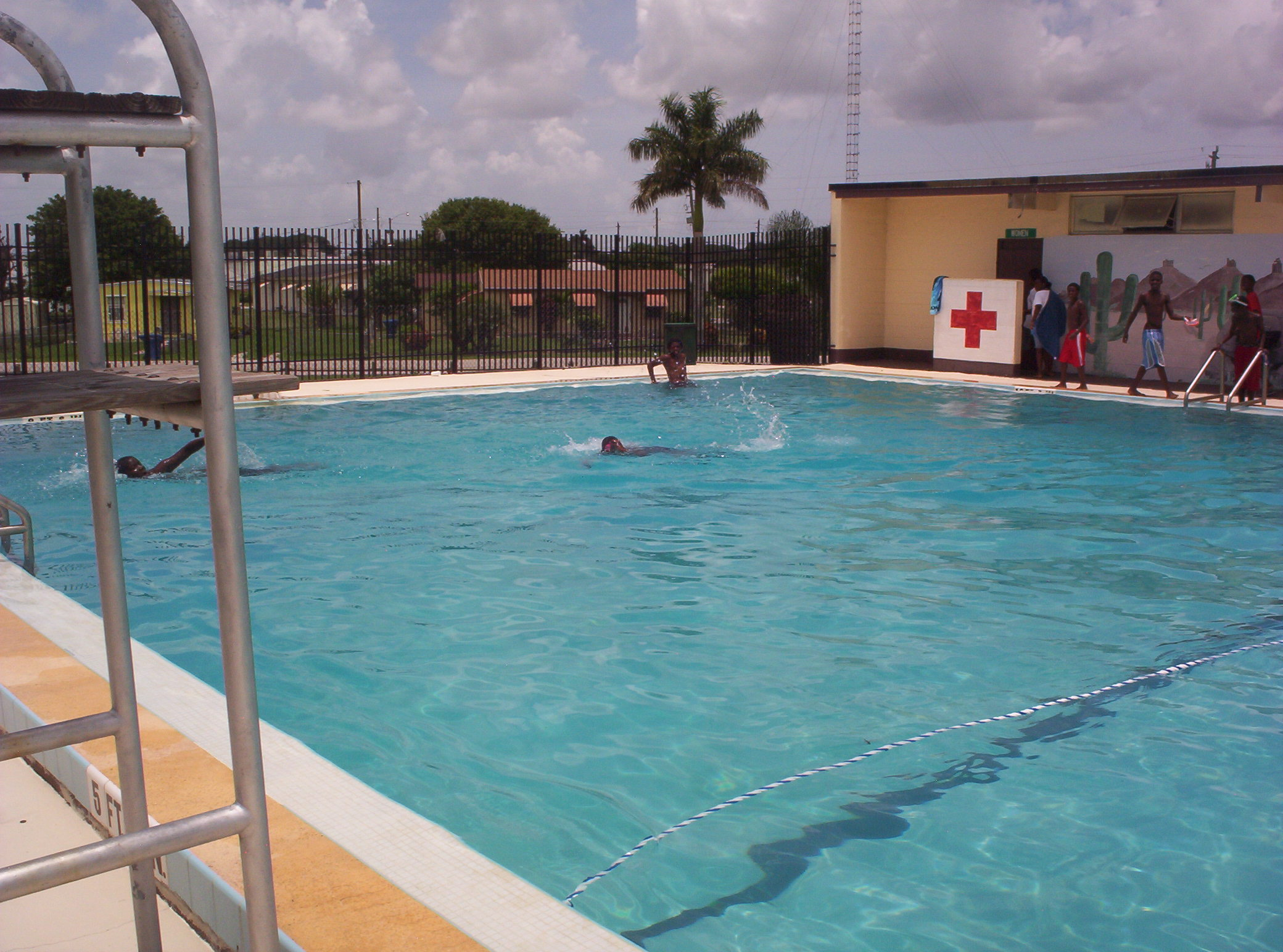
Pool at Lakeshore in Belle Glade

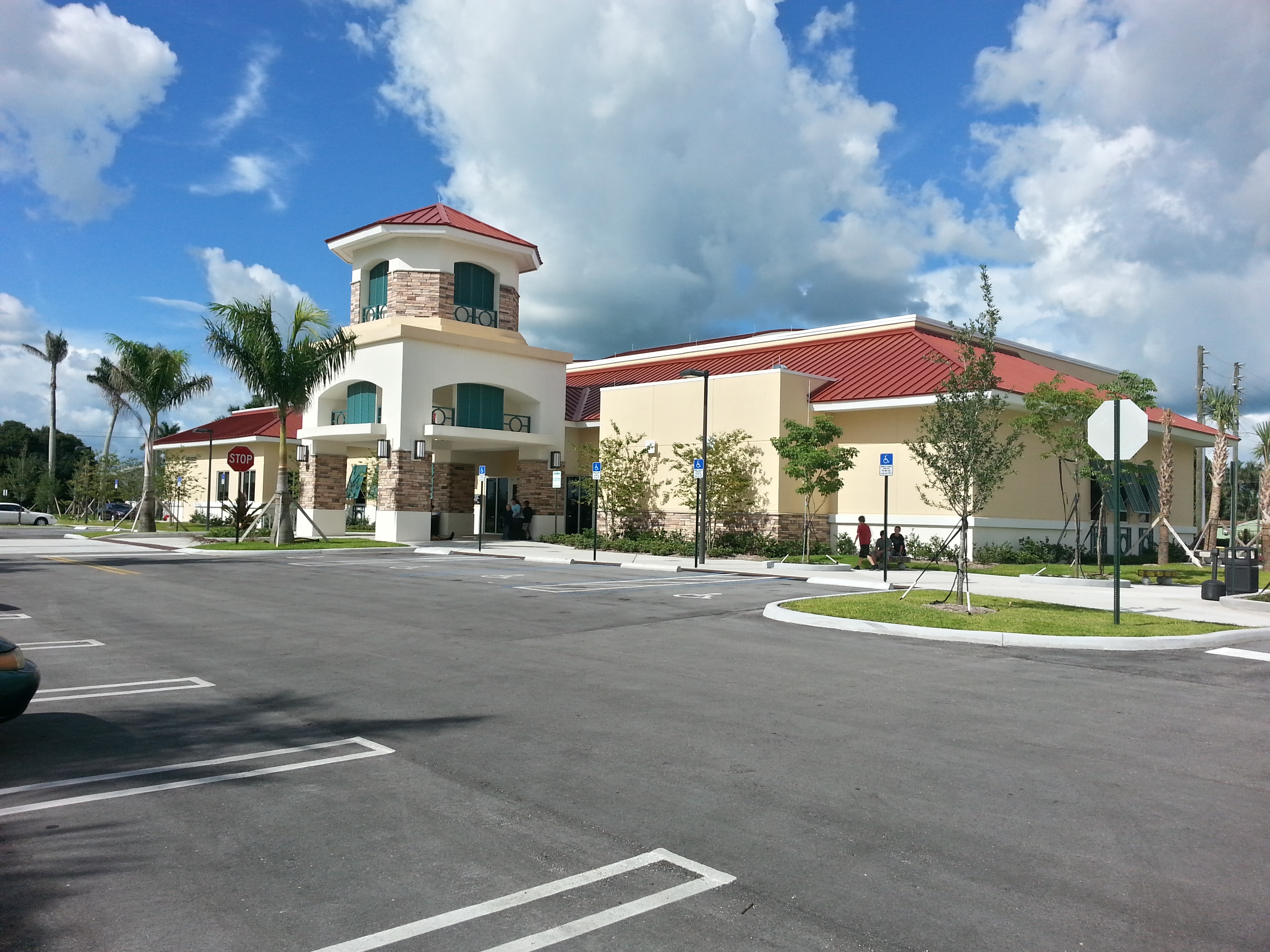
The Belle Glade Branch Library is operated by the Palm Beach County Library System

The Lake Okeechobee Scenic Trail runs through Belle Glade.

== Education ==
School District of Palm Beach County operates public schools.

=== Elementary schools ===
- Gove Elementary
- Belle Glade Elementary
- Glade View Elementary
- Pioneer Park Elementary
- Sellew Belle Glade Excel Charter School

=== Middle schools ===
- Lake Shore Middle School

=== High schools ===
- Glades Central High School

=== Private schools ===
- Glades Day School
- Lakeside Academy

=== College ===
- Palm Beach State College – Belle Glade Campus

== Notable people ==
- Reidel Anthony, former NFL wide receiver, Tampa Bay Buccaneers
- Brad Banks, CFL quarterback, Winnipeg Blue Bombers; 2002 Heisman Trophy first runner-up for the University of Iowa
- Kelvin Benjamin, NFL wide receiver
- Travis Benjamin, NFL wide receiver and punt returner
- Roosevelt Blackmon, NFL cornerback, Green Bay Packers, Cincinnati Bengals
- Rashaad Duncan, Former NFL Defensive Tackle for Tampa Bay, Buffalo Bills, Washington Redskins
- Jessie Hester, former NFL wide receiver for four teams
- Santonio Holmes, NFL wide receiver for three teams; Super Bowl XLIII MVP
- James Lee, NFL offensive lineman, Tampa Bay Buccaneers
- Barkevious Mingo, NFL linebacker, Arizona Cardinals
- Jimmy Moreland, NFL cornerback, Washington Football Team
- Louis Oliver, former NFL safety, Miami Dolphins and Cincinnati Bengals
- Fred Taylor, former NFL running back, Jacksonville Jaguars
- Deonte Thompson, NFL wide receiver
- Andre Waters, former NFL safety, Philadelphia Eagles and Arizona Cardinals
- Rhondy Weston, former NFL defensive lineman for three teams

== In popular culture ==
The refinery scenes from Empire of the Ants (1977) were shot in Belle Glade.

== See also ==
- Eagle Academy (Belle Glade)
