= 2006 USC Trojans football team =

American college football season

2006 USC Trojans football

Pac-10 co-champion Rose Bowl champion

Rose Bowl, W 32–18 vs. Michigan
- Conference: Pac-10 Conference

Ranking
- Coaches: No. 4
- AP: No. 4
- Record: 11–2 (7–2 Pac-10)
- Head coach: Pete Carroll (6th season)
- Offensive coordinator: Lane Kiffin (2nd season)
- Offensive scheme: Multiple pro-style
- Defensive coordinator: Nick Holt (1st season)
- Base defense: 3–4
- Captains: John David Booty; Ryan Kalil; Oscar Lua; Dallas Sartz
- Home stadium: Los Angeles Coliseum

2006 Pacific-10 Conference football standings
	Conf.			Overall
Team	W		L	W		L
No. 4 USC +	7	–	2	11	–	2
No. 14 California +	7	–	2	10	–	3
No. 21 Oregon State	6	–	3	10	–	4
UCLA	5	–	4	7	–	6
Arizona State	4	–	5	7	–	6
Oregon	4	–	5	7	–	6
Arizona	4	–	5	6	–	6
Washington State	4	–	5	6	–	6
Washington	3	–	6	5	–	7
Stanford	1	–	8	1	–	11
+ – Conference co-champions; Rankings from AP Poll

The 2006 USC Trojans football team represented the University of Southern California during the 2006 NCAA Division I FBS football season, winning the Pacific-10 Conference (Pac-10) and playing in the Rose Bowl. The team was coached by Pete Carroll, led on offense by quarterback John David Booty, and played its home games in the Los Angeles Memorial Coliseum.

The previous year's team had played for the national championship, however, with many starters gone, including two Heisman Trophy-winners, there were doubts the team could repeat the success. With a highly ranked recruiting class, however, the Trojans were ranked in the top-5 in many pre-season polls. USC's 13–9 loss to rival UCLA snapped its NCAA-record streak of 63 consecutive 20-point games, and eliminated their hopes of playing in the BCS National Championship game. The team finished the regular season with a 10–2 record and were invited to the Bowl Championship Series (BCS) to play at the 2007 Rose Bowl, where they beat the Michigan Wolverines. With a final record of 11–2, they finished the season ranked fourth in both the Associated Press (AP) and Coaches Polls. Following the season, a number of players won national awards, while five players left the team as they were selected in the 2007 NFL draft.

== Before the season ==
The four previous Trojan teams were very successful. Since the 2002 season, the Trojans won four Pacific-10 Conference (Pac-10) titles, two national championships, and three players won the Heisman Trophy. The 2003 team won the Associated Press (AP) national championship, while the 2004 team won the Bowl Championship Series (BCS) and AP championships. Additionally, the 2005 team, named by some of the media as one of the best offenses in the history of college football, played for the national championship where they lost to the Texas Longhorns. Eleven starters returned from that team, and the Trojans were picked by the Pac-10 media to win the conference. The team began the season ranked sixth in the AP Poll and third in the Coaches Poll.

=== Coaching changes ===
After the 2005 season, defensive coordinator, Jethro Franklin, took an assistant coaching position with the Tampa Bay Buccaneers. Idaho coach, Nick Holt, a former assistant at USC, was hired to replace him. Holt had previously served as linebackers coach for three years at USC.

=== Roster changes ===
Although returning 11 starters from 2005, the team lost eleven players to the National Football League (NFL), including 2004 Heisman Trophy winner, Matt Leinart, and 2005 Heisman winner, Reggie Bush. Bush, who had one year left of eligibility, announced his plans to skip his senior season a week after the team's loss in the Rose Bowl. Bush was eventually selected as the second pick in the 2006 NFL draft, while Leinart was the second Trojan selected in the first round. In all the team lost eight players on offense and three on defense.

=== Recruiting ===
The Trojans signed 25 recruits for the new class. Included in the top ranked class were four five-star recruits on defense, three five-star recruits on offense, and another thirteen four-star recruits.

College recruiting (2006)
Name	Hometown	School	Height	Weight	40^{‡}	Commit date
Kenny Ashley; RB	Venice, California	Venice Senior High School	5 ft 8 in (1.73 m)	205 lb (93 kg)	4.47	Jan 28, 2006
Kenny Ashley; RB	Recruit ratings: Scout: Rivals: (74)					
Walker Ashley; DT	Eden Prairie, Minnesota	Eden Prairie High	6 ft 4 in (1.93 m)	300 lb (140 kg)	4.96	Feb 3, 2006
Walker Ashley; DT	Recruit ratings: Rivals: (40)					
David Ausberry; WR	Lemoore, California	Lemoore High School	6 ft 4 in (1.93 m)	214 lb (97 kg)	4.65	Jan 7, 2006
David Ausberry; WR	Recruit ratings: Scout: Rivals:					
Allen Bradford; LB	Colton, California	Colton High School	6 ft 0 in (1.83 m)	220 lb (100 kg)	4.55	Jan 7, 2006
Allen Bradford; LB	Recruit ratings: Scout: Rivals: (87)					
C.J. Gable; S	Sylmar, California	Sylmar Senior High School	6 ft 0 in (1.83 m)	185 lb (84 kg)	4.55	Jan 19, 2006
C.J. Gable; S	Recruit ratings: Scout: Rivals: (84)					
Garrett Green; QB	Sherman Oaks, California	Notre Dame High School	6 ft 2 in (1.88 m)	190 lb (86 kg)	4.5	Feb 1, 2006
Garrett Green; QB	Recruit ratings: Scout: Rivals: (78)					
Stanley Havili; RB	Salt Lake City, Utah	Cottonwood High School	6 ft 0 in (1.83 m)	210 lb (95 kg)	4.52	Jan 14, 2006
Stanley Havili; RB	Recruit ratings: Scout: Rivals: (71)					
Vidal Hazleton; WR	Chatham, Virginia	Hargrave Military Academy	6 ft 3 in (1.91 m)	195 lb (88 kg)	4.5	Dec 30, 2005
Vidal Hazleton; WR	Recruit ratings: Scout: Rivals: (93)					
Zack Heberer; OL	San Pedro, California	San Pedro Senior High School	6 ft 4 in (1.93 m)	277 lb (126 kg)	5.1	Jun 12, 2005
Zack Heberer; OL	Recruit ratings: Scout: Rivals: (77)					
Jamere Holland; WR	Woodland Hills, California	William Howard Taft High School	6 ft 1 in (1.85 m)	175 lb (79 kg)	4.35	Feb 1, 2006
Jamere Holland; WR	Recruit ratings: Scout: Rivals: (82)					
Stafon Johnson; RB	Los Angeles	Susan Miller Dorsey High School	5 ft 11 in (1.80 m)	200 lb (91 kg)	4.45	Jan 27, 2006
Stafon Johnson; RB	Recruit ratings: Scout: Rivals: (90)					
Vincent Joseph; DB	Long Beach, California	Polytechnic High School	5 ft 9 in (1.75 m)	175 lb (79 kg)	4.5	Jan 29, 2006
Vincent Joseph; DB	Recruit ratings: Scout: Rivals: (81)					
Butch Lewis; OT	Aurora, Colorado	Regis Jesuit High School	6 ft 6 in (1.98 m)	280 lb (130 kg)	5.0	Jan 7, 2006
Butch Lewis; OT	Recruit ratings: Scout: Rivals: (81)					
Taylor Mays; S	Seattle, Washington	O'Dea High School	6 ft 3 in (1.91 m)	220 lb (100 kg)	4.55	Aug 14, 2005
Taylor Mays; S	Recruit ratings: Scout: Rivals: (92)					
Anthony McCoy; TE	Fresno, California	Bullard High School	6 ft 4 in (1.93 m)	230 lb (100 kg)	4.6	Dec 9, 2005
Anthony McCoy; TE	Recruit ratings: Scout: Rivals: (79)					
Emmanuel Moody; RB	Coppell, Texas	Coppell High School	6 ft 0 in (1.83 m)	190 lb (86 kg)	4.5	Jan 7, 2006
Emmanuel Moody; RB	Recruit ratings: Scout: Rivals: (85)					
Michael Morgan; LB	Dallas, Texas	Skyline High School	6 ft 2 in (1.88 m)	190 lb (86 kg)	4.55	Jan 31, 2006
Michael Morgan; LB	Recruit ratings: Scout: Rivals: (82)					
Alex Parsons; DT	Irvine, California	Woodbridge High School	6 ft 4 in (1.93 m)	255 lb (116 kg)	4.85	Dec 18, 2005
Alex Parsons; DT	Recruit ratings: Scout: Rivals: (75)					
Travon Patterson; WR	Long Beach, California	Polytechnic High School	5 ft 9 in (1.75 m)	165 lb (75 kg)	4.45	Jan 26, 2006
Travon Patterson; WR	Recruit ratings: Scout: Rivals: (79)					
Antwine Perez; S	Camden, New Jersey	Woodrow Wilson High School	6 ft 1 in (1.85 m)	200 lb (91 kg)	4.5	Sep 25, 2005
Antwine Perez; S	Recruit ratings: Scout: Rivals: (91)					
Alfred Rowe; LB	Long Beach, California	Polytechnic High School	6 ft 1 in (1.85 m)	195 lb (88 kg)	4.5	Jan 31, 2006
Alfred Rowe; LB	Recruit ratings: Scout: Rivals: (68)					
Derek Simmons; DE	Fairfield, California	Armijo High School	6 ft 4 in (1.93 m)	270 lb (120 kg)	4.9	Jun 28, 2005
Derek Simmons; DE	Recruit ratings: Scout: Rivals: (78)					
Joshua Tatum; LB	Oakland, California	McClymonds Senior High School	6 ft 1 in (1.85 m)	220 lb (100 kg)	4.6	Dec 11, 2005
Joshua Tatum; LB	Recruit ratings: Scout: Rivals: (82)					
Gerald Washington; TE	Rancho Cucamonga, California	Chaffey	6 ft 6 in (1.98 m)	253 lb (115 kg)	4.6	May 29, 2005
Gerald Washington; TE	Recruit ratings: Scout: Rivals:					
Shareece Wright; CB	Colton, California	Colton High School	5 ft 11 in (1.80 m)	182 lb (83 kg)	4.51	Dec 31, 2005
Shareece Wright; CB	Recruit ratings: Scout: Rivals: (76)					
Overall recruit ranking: Scout: #1 Rivals: #1
‡ Refers to 40-yard dash; Note: In many cases, Scout, Rivals, 247Sports, On3, and ESPN may conflict in their listings of height, weight and 40 time.; In these cases, the average was taken. ESPN grades are on a 100-point scale.; Sources: "2006 USC Football Commitment List". Rivals.; "Scout.com Football Recruiting: USC". Scout.; "2006 Player Commitments – USC". ESPN.; "Scout.com Team Recruiting Rankings". Scout.; "2006 Team Ranking". Rivals.com.

=== Pre-season honors ===
Eleven Trojan players were named to pre-season national award watchlists.

- Sam Baker–Lombardi Award and Outland Trophy
- John David Booty–Maxwell Award
- Brian Cushing–Chuck Bednarik Award
- Fred Davis–John Mackey Award
- Lawrence Jackson–Lombardi Award, Bronko Nagurski Trophy, Chuck Bednarik Award, Ted Hendricks Award, and Lott Trophy
- Dwayne Jarrett–Maxwell Award and Walter Camp Award
- Ryan Kalil–Lombardi Award, Outland Trophy, and Dave Rimington Trophy
- Oscar Lua–Chuck Bednarik Award
- Rey Maualuga–Butkus Award
- Keith Rivers–Chuck Bednarik Award and Butkus Award
- Steve Smith–Maxwell Award

In addition to the awards, five players were named to various pre-season All-America teams. Playboy, Athlon, Lindy's, Street & Smith's, Rivals.com, and NationalChamps.Net each named Jarrett and Baker to their first teams, with Jarrett also named to Sporting News, Blue Ribbon's, Phil Steele's, and Collegefootballnews.com first teams. Both ESPN.com and Street & Smith named Jackson and Kalil to their first teams, and Jackson was additionally named to Sporting News Athlon, and Phil Steele's first teams. Rivers was named to various second teams.

== Season ==
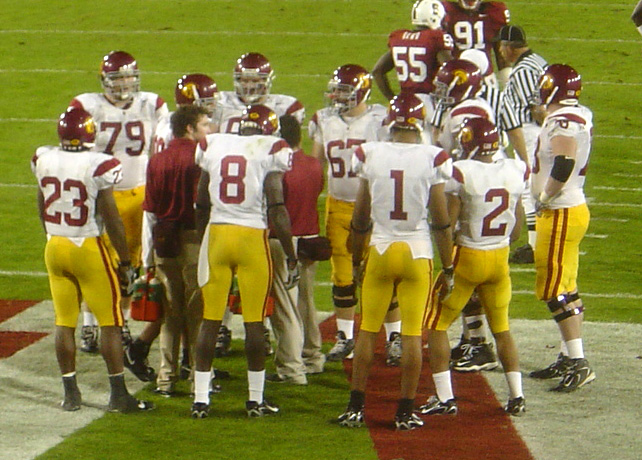
The 2006 Trojans in a huddle during a game against Stanford

=== Roster ===
(as of August 21, 2006)
Wide receivers: 1 Patrick Turner – Sophomore; 2 Steve Smith – Senior; 7 Vidal Hazelton – Freshman; 8 Dwayne Jarrett – Junior; 9 David Ausberry – Freshman; 17 Travon Patterson – Freshman; 18 Jamere Holland – Freshman; 19 Christian Allen – (redshirt) Junior; 24 Ben Malcolmson – (redshirt) Senior; 46 Sean Calcagnie – Freshman; 47 Scott Stephens – Freshman; 48 Brad Walker – Junior; 80 Spencer Vigoren – Freshman; 82 Chris McFoy – (redshirt) Senior; 85 Akeem Wade – Freshman; Offensive line: 50 Will Collins – (redshirt) Junior; 53 Jeff Byers – (redshirt) Sophomore; 60 Drew Radovich – (redshirt) Junior; 62 Dominique Wise – (redshirt) Senior; 63 Travis Draper – (redshirt) Sophomore; 66 Chilo Rachal – (redshirt) Sophomore; 67 Ryan Kalil – Senior; 68 Butch Lewis – Freshman; 69 Matt Spanos – (redshirt) Junior; 70 Alatini Malu – (redshirt) Junior; 71 Charles Brown – (redshirt) Freshman; 73 Jonathan Richert – (redshirt) Senior; 74 Zack Heberer – Freshman; 76 Nick Howell – (redshirt) Freshman; 77 Thomas Herring – (redshirt) Freshman; 78 Kyle Williams – (redshirt) Senior; 79 Sam Baker – (redshirt) Junior; Tight ends: 83 Fred Davis – Junior; 81 Gerald Washington – Junior; 85 Cooper Stephenson – Freshman; 86 Anthony McCoy – Freshman; 87 Nick Vanderboom – (redshirt) Senior; 88 Jimmy Miller – (redshirt) Sophomore; 89 Dale Thompson – Junior	Quarterbacks: 6 Mark Sanchez – (redshirt) Freshman; 9 Tyler Davis – Freshman; 10 John David Booty – (redshirt) Junior; 15 Duron Sylvester – Freshman; 16 Michael McDonald – (redshirt) Junior; Fullbacks: 30 Mike Brittingham – (redshirt) Senior; 31 Stanley Havili – Freshman; 35 Jody Adewale – (redshirt) Junior; 37 Ryan Powdrell – (redshirt) Senior; 40 Brandon Hancock – (redshirt) Senior; 41 Thomas Williams – (redshirt) Junior; Running backs: 13 Stafon Johnson – Freshman; 21 Allen Bradford – Freshman; 22 Desmond Reed – (redshirt) Junior; 23 Chauncey Washington – (redshirt) Junior; 25 C.J. Gable – Freshman; 26 Emmanuel Moody – Freshman; 27 Michael Coleman – Sophomore; 29 John Griffin – (redshirt) Junior; 34 Hershel Dennis – (redshirt) Senior; Defensive line: 44 Rashaad Goodrum – (redshirt) Senior; 49 Sedrick Ellis – (redshirt) Junior; 54 Jeff Schweiger – Junior; 56 Alex Parsons – Freshman; 64 Mike Davis – (redshirt) Senior; 75 Fili Moala – (redshirt) Sophomore; 84 Kyle Moore – Sophomore; 90 Derek Simmons – Freshman; 91 Chris Barrett – (redshirt) Junior; 93 Lawrence Miles – (redshirt) Sophomore; 94 Walker Lee Ashley – Freshman; 95 Travis Tofi – (redshirt) Senior; 96 Lawrence Jackson – (redshirt) Junior; 97 Alex Morrow – (redshirt) Junior; 99 Averell Spicer – (redshirt) Freshman	Linebackers: 10 Brian Cushing – Sophomore; 37 Dan Deckas – Freshman; 42 Dallas Sartz – (redshirt) Senior; 43 Kaluka Maiava – Sophomore; 45 Oscar Lua – Senior; 46 Michael Morgan – Freshman; 47 Clay Matthews III – (redshirt) Sophomore; 51 Joshua Tatum – Freshman; 52 Luthur Brown – (redshirt) Freshman; 55 Keith Rivers – Junior; 57 Nick Garratt – (redshirt) Freshman; 58 Rey Maualuga – Sophomore; 59 Lou Ferrigno Jr. – (redshirt) Senior; Defensive backs: 4 Kevin Ellison – Sophomore; 6 Antwine Perez – Freshman; 7 Cary Harris – Sophomore; 9 Mozique McCurtis – (redshirt) Sophomore; 14 Garrett Green – Freshman; 15 Kevin Thomas – Sophomore; 22 Jim Abbott – (redshirt) Sophomore; 23 Vincent Joseph – Freshman; 24 Shareece Wright – Freshman; 25 Chase McWhorter – (redshirt) Junior; 26 Will Harris – Sophomore; 27 Brent Yoshida – (redshirt) Senior; 28 Terrell Thomas – (redshirt) Junior; 29 Taylor Mays – Freshman; 30 Jerry Williams – (redshirt) Junior; 31 Jamel Williams – (redshirt) Junior; 35 Justin Hart – (redshirt) Freshman; 36 Josh Pinkard – Junior; 38 Robert Erickson – Freshman; 39 Alfred Rowe – Freshman; 48 Matthew Jordan – (redshirt) Freshman; Punters: 16 Taylor Odegard – (redshirt) Sophomore; 44 Greg Woidneck – (redshirt) Sophomore; Kickers: 17 Troy Van Blarcom – Sophomore; 18 David Buehler – Sophomore; 19 Mario Danelo – (redshirt) Junior
† Starter at position Injured; will not play in 2006

The Trojans went into the 2006 campaign having suffered many season-ending injuries. Redshirt senior and 2003 starting fullback Brandon Hancock tore his knee ligaments in fall camp, ending his career. Hancock was expected to start at fullback. Redshirt senior running back and 2003 starter Hershel Dennis re-tore his knee ligaments in spring practice after initially tearing them during the 2005 FedEx Orange Bowl, finishing his time at USC unless he gets a sixth year of eligibility. Dennis was expected to compete for the starting tailback job with redshirt junior Chauncey Washington and a host of talented freshmen. Sophomore safety Will Harris suffered torn knee ligaments during the off-season while recovering from a 2005 knee injury and was not expected to return in 2006. Senior defensive end Rashaad Goodrum suffered a back and rib injury in 2005 and was not expected to play again for USC. Redshirt sophomore defensive end Lawrence Miles missed the season while recovering from shoulder surgery and was expected to miss the season. Redshirt senior walk-on linebacker Lou Ferrigno Jr. suffered a season-ending knee injury in spring practice and is out of eligibility. Freshman wide receiver Jamere Holland was lost for the season with a shoulder injury. Freshman linebacker Joshua Tatum suffered a knee injury. Redshirt junior offensive lineman Matt Spanos was academically ineligible.

By the Trojans' first game at Arkansas, the starting lineup had undergone some revisions from the expected one from the summer. True freshman tailback C.J. Gable beat out talented freshmen Emmanuel Moody, Allen Bradford, and Stafon Johnson along with upperclassmen Desmond Reed and Michael Coleman for the starting job after junior Chauncey Washington was not ready to go due to injuries. Redshirt junior fullback Ryan Powdrell won the starting job after Hancock's season ended before it began. Redshirt junior Drew Radovich beat out Jeff Byers for the starter's job at left guard. Sophomore linebacker Brian Cushing was installed in Kyle Moore's starting spot at defensive end. Redshirt junior cornerback Terrell Thomas became the other starter with Kevin Thomas. Redshirt senior linebacker Oscar Lua was the first starting middle linebacker. Finally, redshirt sophomore walk-on Greg Woidneck won the starting punter's job.

=== Coaching staff ===
The Trojan team was coached by sixth-year head coach, Pete Carroll and his staff, most of whom returned from 2005.

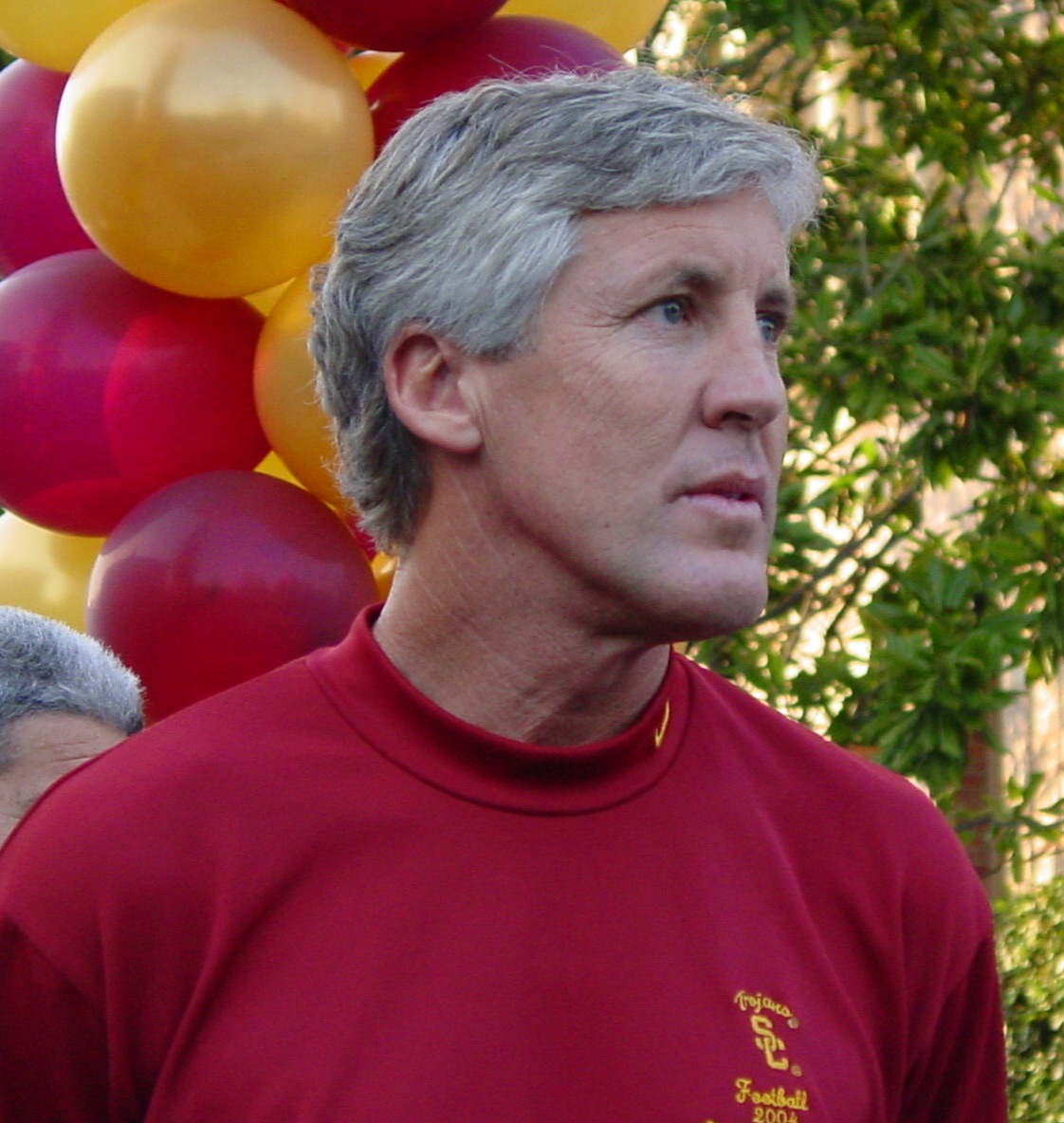
Head coach Pete Carroll

Name	Position	Year at USC	Alma mater (year)
Pete Carroll	Head coach	6th	Pacific (1973)
Lane Kiffin	Offensive coordinator Wide receivers Recruiting coordinator	6th	Fresno State (1998)
Steve Sarkisian	Assistant head coach Quarterbacks	5th 2001–2003, 2005 – present	BYU (1997)
Nick Holt	Defensive coordinator Defensive line	4th 2001–2003, 2006 – present	Pacific (1986)
Todd McNair	Running backs Special teams coordinator	3rd	Temple
Brennan Carroll	Assistant head coach Tight ends	5th	Pittsburgh (2001)
Ken Norton Jr.	Linebackers	3rd	UCLA (1988)
Pat Ruel	Offensive line	2nd	Miami (1972)
Rocky Seto	Secondary	8th	USC (1999)
David Watson	Defensive line	2nd	Western Illinois (2001)
Chris Carlisle	Strength and conditioning	6th	Chadron State (1985)

=== Schedule ===
Date	Time	Opponent	Rank	Site	TV	Result	Attendance
September 2	5:45 p.m.	at Arkansas*	No. 6	Donald W. Reynolds Razorback Stadium; Fayetteville, AR	ESPN	W 50–14	76,564
September 16	5:00 p.m.	No. 19 Nebraska*	No. 4	Los Angeles Memorial Coliseum; Los Angeles, CA (College GameDay)	ABC	W 28–10	92,000
September 23	5:00 p.m.	at Arizona	No. 3	Arizona Stadium; Tucson, AZ	ABC	W 20–3	58,801
September 30	4:00 p.m.	at Washington State	No. 3	Martin Stadium; Pullman, WA	TBS	W 28–22	35,117
October 7	12:30 p.m.	Washington	No. 3	Los Angeles Memorial Coliseum; Los Angeles, CA	FSN	W 26–20	90,282
October 14	5:00 p.m.	Arizona State	No. 3	Los Angeles Memorial Coliseum; Los Angeles, CA	ABC	W 28–21	91,126
October 28	12:30 p.m.	at Oregon State	No. 3	Reser Stadium; Corvallis, OR	FSN	L 31–33	42,871
November 4	4:00 p.m.	at Stanford	No. 9	Stanford Stadium; Stanford, CA (rivalry)	FSN	W 42–0	49,371
November 11	7:15 p.m.	No. 21 Oregon^{†}	No. 7	Los Angeles Memorial Coliseum; Los Angeles, CA	FSN	W 35–10	92,000
November 18	5:00 p.m.	No. 17 California	No. 4	Los Angeles Memorial Coliseum; Los Angeles, CA	ABC	W 23–9	91,672
November 25	5:00 p.m.	No. 6 Notre Dame*	No. 3	Los Angeles Memorial Coliseum; Los Angeles, CA (rivalry, College GameDay)	ABC	W 44–24	91,800
December 2	1:30 p.m.	at UCLA	No. 2	Rose Bowl; Pasadena, CA (Victory Bell)	ABC	L 9–13	90,622
January 1, 2007	2:00 p.m.	vs. No. 3 Michigan*	No. 8	Rose Bowl; Pasadena, CA (Rose Bowl, College GameDay)	ABC	W 32–18	93,952
*Non-conference game; ^{†}Homecoming; Rankings from AP Poll released prior to the game; All times are in Pacific time

== Rankings ==
Ranking movements Legend: ██ Increase in ranking ██ Decrease in ranking т = Tied with team above or below ( ) = First-place votes
	Week															
Poll	Pre	1	2	3	4	5	6	7	8	9	10	11	12	13	14	Final
AP	6 (3)	3 (3)	4 (2)	3 (2)	3 (2)	3 (1)	3	3	3	9	7	4	3	2	8	4
Coaches	3T (1)	3 (4)	2 (2)	2 (2)	2 (2)	2	2	2	2	9	7	4	2	2	7	4
Harris	Not released				2 (4)	2 (4)	2 (1)	3 (1)	3	9	7	3	2	2	7	Not released
BCS	Not released							2	3	8	7	3	3	2	5	Not released

== Game summaries ==
USC began the season with many impressive streaks intact despite having lost the 2006 Rose Bowl to Texas.

- 27 straight home games (Pac-10 and school record)
- 23 straight Pac-10 games (Pac-10 and school record)
- 19 straight Pac-10 home games (Pac-10 and school record)
- 15 straight road games
- 11 straight Pac-10 road games
- 8 straight non-conference home games
- 5 straight non-conference road games
- 16 straight October games
- 16 straight November games
- 52 straight 20-point games

=== Arkansas ===
	1	2	3	4	Total
No. 6 Trojans	3	13	14	20	50
Razorbacks	0	7	0	7	14

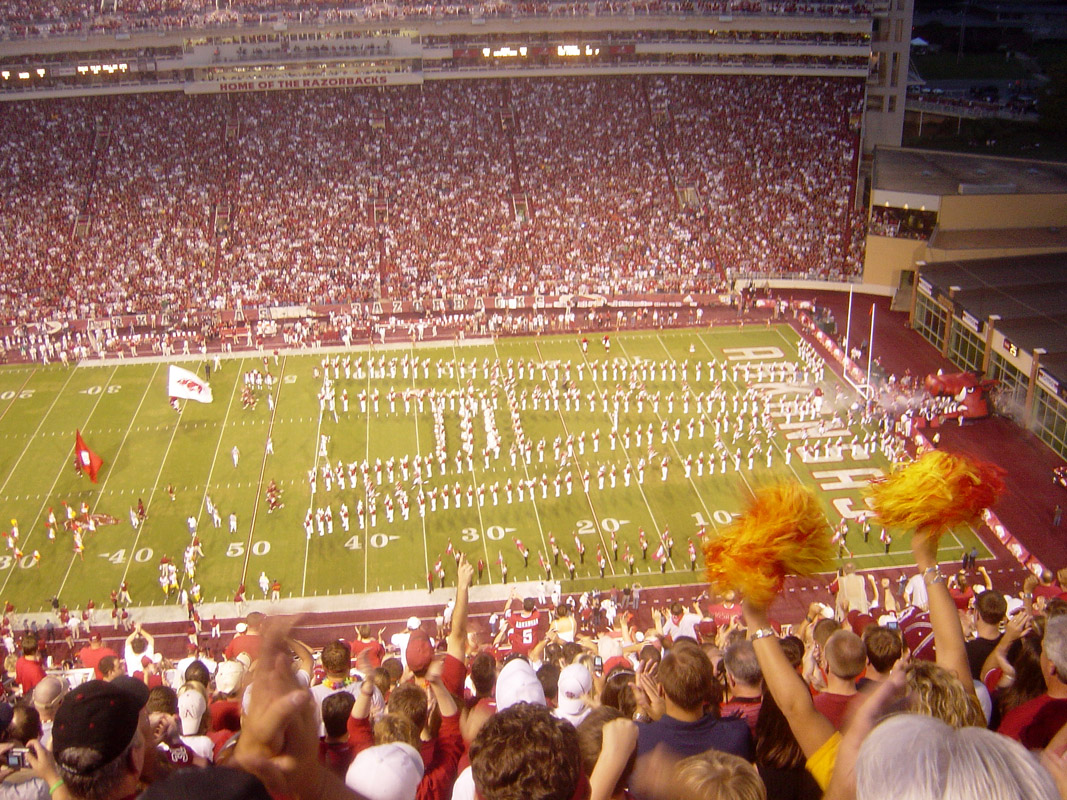
The Razorbacks take the field for their game against the visiting Trojans.

Although both ESPN and Arkansas asked for the game to be moved, the Trojans opened their season playing at the Arkansas Razorbacks, who were led by ninth-year head coach Houston Nutt and by running back Darren McFadden. Although USC won the game in 2005, 70–17, this game looked to be closer as the Trojans had to replace two Heisman Trophy winners, Leinart and Bush. However, with John David Booty taking over for Leinart and C.J. Gable becoming the first true freshman to start at running back in USC history, the Trojans outmatched the Razorbacks. Although Razorback freshman quarterback, Mitch Mustain, ran for the first touchdown of his career and one Razorback running back ran for a touchdown, Booty threw three touchdowns, three Trojan running backs ran for a touchdown each, and Mario Danelo kicked two field goals to outscore them, 50–14. A crowd of 76,564, a record in Razorback Stadium, attended the game. With the win, the Trojans extended their record-setting streak of games where they scored at least 20 points to 53.

=== Nebraska ===
	1	2	3	4	Total
No. 19 Cornhuskers	3	0	0	7	10
No. 4 Trojans	7	7	7	7	28

The Nebraska Cornhuskers, led by second-year head coach Bill Callahan, traveled to face the Trojans in the Coliseum, where the Trojans held a 27-home-game winning streak. Although the Cornhuskers had an early 3–0 lead, three unanswered touchdown passes by Booty gave the Trojans a 21–3 lead in the third quarter. Although quarterback Zac Taylor ran for a touchdown to cut the Trojans' lead, a rushing touchdown by Chauncey Washington sealed the win for the Trojans, 28–10. During the game, wide receiver Dwayne Jarrett, with two receiving touchdowns, became USC's all-time leader in touchdown receptions, with 31. With the win, the Trojans extended their streak of games where they scored at least 20 points to 54 and extended their Pac-10-record home winning streak to 28.

=== Arizona ===
	1	2	3	4	Total
No. 3 Trojans	0	3	7	10	20
Wildcats	0	0	0	3	3

The Trojans next traveled to face the Arizona Wildcats, led by third-year head coach, Mike Stoops. Both offenses struggled early in the game, and the Trojans took a 3–0 lead before half-time. The Trojans finally increased their lead in the third quarter when Jarrett scored the first touchdown of the game to tie the Pac-10 record for career receiving touchdowns with 32. A fourth-quarter field goal by the Wildcats brought them within a touchdown, but the Trojans answered with a Danelo field goal. Emmanuel Moody ran for the last score of the game to give the Trojans a 20–3 win and extend their streak of games where they scored at least 20 points to 55. With the conference win, the Trojans increased their winning streak over conference foes to 24 games. The win did not come without a price, however, as the Trojans, who had already lost fullbacks, Brandon Hancock and Ryan Powdrell to season-ending injuries, lost freshman fullback, Stanley Havili, to an ankle injury.

=== Washington State ===
	1	2	3	4	Total
No. 3 Trojans	7	7	7	7	28
Cougars	3	0	9	10	22

The Trojans next traveled to face the Washington State Cougars, led by fourth-year head coach, Bill Doba, and quarterback, Alex Brink. Although Jarrett came into the game tied for the Pac-10 career record of receiving touchdowns, he would sit out the game with an ankle injury. Steve Smith took his place, however, and scored two touchdowns to lead the Trojans in the 28–22 win. Although the Cougars lost their only lead in the first quarter, they had a chance to score and tie the game on the final play of the game before Brink's pass was intercepted. The Trojans continued their conference winning streak and moved to 25 games and increased their streak of scoring 20 points to 56 games.

=== Washington ===
	1	2	3	4	Total
Huskies	3	7	3	7	20
No. 3 Trojans	7	10	6	3	26

The Washington, led by first-year head coach, Tyrone Willingham, and quarterback, Isaiah Stanback, next visited the Trojans. Willingham was the last coach to beat the Trojans at the Coliseum in 2001 with Stanford, but the Huskies were large underdogs. Despite this, the Huskies kept the game close, as, after two early Trojan touchdowns, their only other scores came from four Danelo field goals. The Huskies scored on two Stanback touchdown passes and two field goals, but the time clock ran out during their final drive, giving the Trojans a 26–20 win. With the win, the Trojans continued their home winning streak, their conference winning streak, and their streak of games scoring over 20 points.

=== Arizona State ===
	1	2	3	4	Total
Sun Devils	0	7	14	0	21
No. 3 Trojans	14	7	0	7	28

The Arizona State Sun Devils, led by sixth-year head coach, Dirk Koetter, and quarterback, Rudy Carpenter, next visited the Trojans. Though the Sun Devils started the season with three wins, they had been blown out in both of their next two games and were a three touchdown underdog to the Trojans. The Trojans dominated the first half with three touchdowns before the Sun Devils could score. Their third touchdown, a pass to Jarrett, made him the Pac-10 leader in career touchdown receptions with 33. The Sun Devils, however, finally answered with a rushing touchdown before half-time. The Sun Devils tied the game in the third quarter with Carpenter's touchdown pass and a returned interception for a touchdown, however, Chauncey Washington ran for the game-winning touchdown late in the fourth quarter to give the final score of 28–21 in favor of the Trojans. Once again scoring over 20 points, they won another home conference game to extend their streaks.

=== Oregon State ===
	1	2	3	4	Total
No. 3 Trojans	0	10	7	14	31
Beavers	7	9	17	0	33

The Trojans next visited the Oregon State Beavers, led by head coach, Mike Riley. The Beavers took an early lead, and, after the Trojans tied the game, scored three field goals to take a nine-point lead. A Danelo field goal at the end of the first half brought the Trojans within six points at half-time. The Beavers took control of the game in the second half, passing for a touchdown, returning a punt for a touchdown, and kicking another field goal to take a 33–10 lead. The Trojans finally answered at the end of the third quarter to bring their deficit to 16 points. In the fourth quarter, Booty threw his second touchdown of the game, and, after a two-point conversion, brought the score to 33–25 in favor of the Beavers. Booty threw his third touchdown of the game with seven seconds remaining, however, their second two-point conversion attempt was batted away by the Beavers to preserve their 33–31 win. Though the Trojans continued their streak of games scoring over 20 points, they ended their streaks of, among others, 38 wins in the regular season, 27 wins against Pac-10 opponents, and 18 wins on the road.

=== Stanford ===
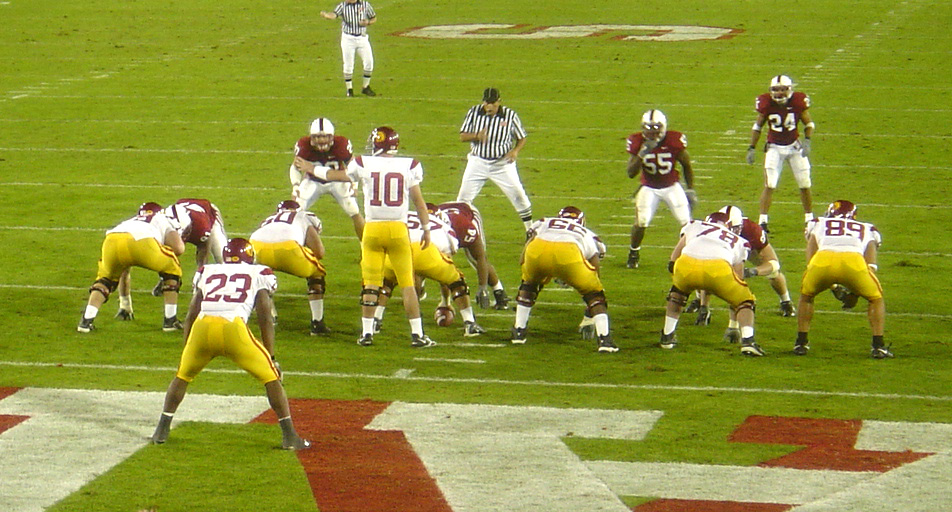
Booty (#10) leading a drive against the Stanford Cardinal

	1	2	3	4	Total
No. 9 Trojans	7	21	7	7	42
Cardinal	0	0	0	0	0

=== Oregon ===
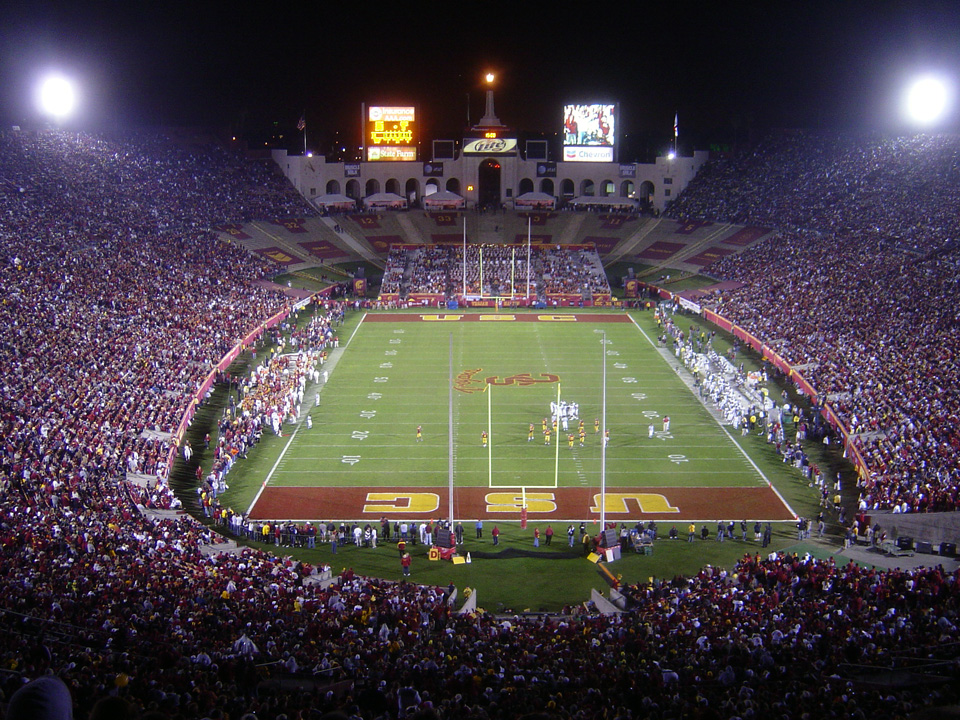
The Coliseum during the 2006 USC-UO game

#21 Oregon at #7 USC

Team	1	2	3	4	Total
No. 21 Oregon	0	0	3	7	10
• No. 7 USC	0	14	14	7	35

- Date: November 11
- Location: Los Angeles Memorial Coliseum, Los Angeles
- Game start: 10:15 p.m. EST

Scoring summary
Q2	USC	Gable 2 yard run (Danelo kick)	USC 7–0
Q2	USC	Washington 5 yard run (Danelo kick)	USC 14–0
Q3	ORE	Martinez 22 yard field goal	USC 14–3
Q3	USC	Washington 2 yard run (Danelo kick)	USC 21–3
Q3	USC	Washington 43 yard run (Danelo kick)	USC 28–3
Q4	ORE	Stewart 8 yard pass from Leaf (Martinez kick)	USC 28–10
Q4	USC	Jarrett 12 yard pass from Booty (Danelo kick)	USC 35–10

=== California ===
	1	2	3	4	Total
No. 17 Bears	2	7	0	0	9
No. 4 Trojans	3	3	3	14	23

=== Notre Dame ===
Team	1	2	3	4	Total
No. 6 Notre Dame	3	7	7	7	24
• No. 3 USC	14	7	7	16	44

- Date: November 25
- Location: Los Angeles Memorial Coliseum, Los Angeles
- Game start: 8:00 p.m. EST

Scoring summary
1	8:38	USC	Dwayne Jarrett 9-yard pass from John David Booty (Mario Danelo kick)	USC 7-0
1	5:16	USC	Dwayne Jarrett 5-yard pass from John David Booty (Mario Danelo kick)	USC 14-3
1	0:36	ND	Carl Gioia 27-yard field goal	USC 14-3
2	11:37	USC	John David Booty 1-yard run (Mario Danelo kick)	USC 21-3
2	7:20	ND	Marcus Freeman 7-yard pass from Brady Quinn (Carl Gioia kick)	USC 21-10
3	10:03	USC	Chauncey Washington 2-yard run (Mario Danelo kick)	USC 28-10
3	1:57	ND	Rhema McKnight 2-yard pass from Brady Quinn (Carl Gioia kick)	USC 28-17
4	11:43	USC	Mario Danelo 34-yard field goal	USC 31-17
4	8:21	USC	Dwayne Jarrett 43-yard pass from John David Booty (kick failed)	USC 37-17
4	3:39	ND	Jeff Samardzija 2-yard pass from Brady Quinn (Carl Gioia kick)	USC 37-24
4	3:31	USC	Brian Cushing 42-yard kickoff return (Mario Danelo kick)	USC 44-24

Notre Dame visited the Coliseum with a four-game losing streak to the Trojans, however an eight-game winning streak in the season. After the epic 2005 game, the Irish thought they might break the losing streak, and would be assured of a BCS Bowl game. With a win, the Trojans knew that they would still be in the national title hunt. The game started with the Irish receiving the ball and Brady Quinn throwing a quick 38-yard pass to Rhema McKnight. The Irish drive stalled afterwards and turned the ball over after Quinn's fourth down pass flew errantly into the endzone. The Trojans took over and quarterback John David Booty led them on a 61-yard drive that ended with a 9-yard touchdown pass to Dwayne Jarrett. After the next Irish drive ended with a punt and a return by the Trojans to the Irish 26, Booty completed another touchdown pass to Jarrett to put the Trojans ahead 14–0. On the ensuing Irish drive, Quinn and Darius Walker brought the Irish downfield, allowing Carl Gioia to kick a field goal. The first quarter ended with the Trojans winning 14–3. In the first drive of the second quarter, Booty led the Trojans to the Irish 1-yard line where he snuck the ball in for USC's third touchdown of the game. On the ensuing drive for the Irish, on a third down, Quinn scrambled for 59-yards, Notre Dame's longest run of the season, to bring the Irish to the USC 17-yard line. Four plays later, a Darius Walker fumble was recovered by the Trojans giving them the ball back. The Irish defense, however, held the Trojans for the first time forcing a punt. The punt was partially blocked giving the Irish the ball back on the 7-yard line. On the next play, Quinn threw a touchdown to Marcus Freeman. The next two drives by the Trojans both ended when Booty threw an interception, but the Irish couldn't capitalize on either, turning the ball over on downs two more times. The half ended with the Trojans leading 21–10.

The second half began with a Trojan drive of 65-yards capped with a Chauncey Washington 2-yard touchdown run. The only other score of the third quarter came on Notre Dame's second drive of 58-yards, when Quinn hit Rhema McKnight for a 2-yard touchdown pass on fourth down. The fourth quarter began with the Trojans driving to an eventual 32-yard field goal by Mario Danelo. After the Irish were held, Booty threw a 43-yard touchdown pass to Dwayne Jarrett to give the Trojans a 37–17 lead (Danelo missed the extra point). Quinn drove the Irish 78-yards and threw a 2-yard touchdown pass to Jeff Samardzija to put the Irish deficit to 13 points. However, the onside kick attempt, was recovered by Brian Cushing, who ran it back to give the Trojans a 20-point lead again. Notre Dame's last drive would end on another failed fourth down attempt, giving the Trojans the 44–24 win.

=== UCLA ===
	1	2	3	4	Total
No. 2 Trojans	2	7	0	0	9
Bruins	7	0	3	3	13

UCLA's defensive performance snapped USC's NCAA-record streak of 63 consecutive 20-point games.

=== Michigan ===
	1	2	3	4	Total
No. 8 Trojans	3	0	16	13	32
No. 3 Wolverines	0	3	0	15	18

In the month leading to the Rose Bowl, starting kicker Troy Van Blarcom was dismissed by the university because of his grades, leaving all duties to Mario Danelo.

The Rose Bowl crowd marked USC's 11th sell out, a single season school record.

== Legacy ==
USC is the first team to win five Pac-10 championships in a row, although the Trojans shared the 2002 championship with Washington State and the 2006 championship with California.

USC's popularity continued to remain high, setting a school record with 11 sold-out games over the season and a total attendance of 995,778, shy of the all-time record set in 2005 of 1,037,565—attributable to the smaller stadiums at away games in the 2006 season.

At the end of the 2006 season, with only Dwayne Jarrett departing early for the NFL and returning many of the starters from the 2006 team, major media sources projected the 2007 USC Trojans football team as the presumptive pre-season No. 1 team and national title contender for the 2007 season.

== 2006 team players in the NFL ==
- Sam Baker
- Fred Davis
- Sedrick Ellis
- Ryan Kalil
- Lawrence Jackson
- Dwayne Jarrett
- Oscar Lua
- Chris McFoy
- Ryan Powdrell
- Drew Radovich
- Chilo Rachal
- Keith Rivers
- Dallas Sartz
- Steve Smith
- Matt Spanos
- Terrell Thomas
- Chauncey Washington
- Kyle Williams
- Thomas Williams
- David Buehler
- Brian Cushing
- Taylor Mays
- Kevin Ellison
- Cary Harris
- Kaluka Maiava
- Clay Matthews III
- Rey Maualuga
- Fili Moala
- Kyle Moore
- Mark Sanchez
- Patrick Turner

== Deaths ==
USC placekicker Mario Danelo was found dead at the bottom of a cliff in San Pedro, California, on the night of January 6, 2007.
