= Thomas Williams (American football) =

American football player (born 1984)

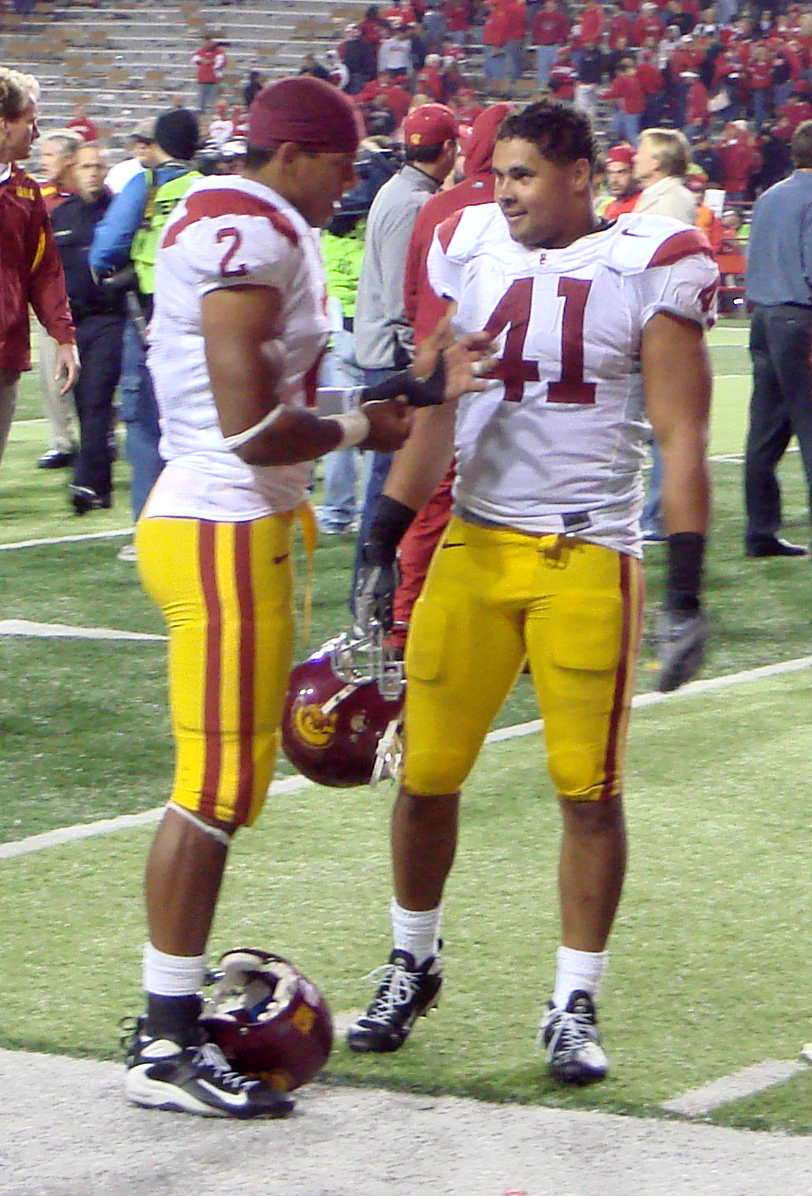
- Williams (#41) celebrates a USC victory with teammate Taylor Mays (#2)

No. 53, 93, 56
- Position: Linebacker

Personal information
- Born: December 25, 1984 (age 41); Vacaville, California, U.S.
- Listed height: 6 ft 2 in (1.88 m)
- Listed weight: 244 lb (111 kg)

Career information
- High school: Vacaville
- College: USC
- NFL draft: 2008: 5th round, 155th overall pick

Career history
- Jacksonville Jaguars (2008); Seattle Seahawks (2009)*; New England Patriots (2009); Buffalo Bills (2010); Carolina Panthers (2010–2011); Tampa Bay Buccaneers (2012)*
- * Offseason or practice squad member only

Career NFL statistics
- Total tackles: 14
- Forced fumbles: 1
- Pass deflections: 2
- Stats at Pro Football Reference

Thomas Ray Williams (born December 25, 1984) is an American former professional football player who was a linebacker in the National Football League (NFL). He was selected by the Jacksonville Jaguars in the fifth round of the 2008 NFL draft. He played college football for the USC Trojans. Williams has been a member of the Seattle Seahawks, New England Patriots, Buffalo Bills, Carolina Panthers, and Tampa Bay Buccaneers. In 2011, he suffered a neck injury that ended his season. The next year, the same injury forced him to retire from his football career.

Williams is now a motivational speaker. He has traveled worldwide speaking to different corporations, athletes and students on how to "fully maximize their potential." In 2014 Thomas R. Williams became a published author after writing his autobiography, "Permission to DREAM." Williams is also a collegiate guest lecturer.

Thomas works close with the Wounded Warrior Project. He focuses on helping soldiers transitioning back from combat.

== Early life ==
Williams played high school football at Vacaville High School. When it came to deciding where to attend college, his final choices were University of Notre Dame and the University of Southern California. Finding them equals in many areas; Williams decided on USC due in part to the diversity of the Los Angeles area as well as the career networking, as he was uncertain he would be able to eventually move on to the NFL.

== College career ==
Thomas R. Williams entered USC in the 2003 recruiting class that included Reggie Bush and LenDale White. Williams started 14 games at 3 different positions (including fullback) while playing college football at USC. He was all-Pac-10 honorable mention in 2007 and was invited to the East West Shrine Game and the Hula Bowl. Williams career stats include, 74 tackles, 1 sack, 3 fumbles forced, 5 passes defensed, 5 tackles for loss, 3 interceptions, and 37 interception return yards. In 2007 Williams had 56 tackles. He had 6 tackles in the 2008 Rose Bowl.

During his time with the Trojans, Williams received guidance and feedback from veteran linebackers such as Lofa Tatupu, Matt Grootegoed, Dallas Sartz, Collin Ashton, and Oscar Lua. In order to see more playing time against the more experienced linebackers ahead of him, Williams focused and excelled at special teams play, particularly kickoff coverage. During his redshirt freshman year he was an active member of the 2004 National Championship team, where he played behind Sartz at the strong-side spot. Early in the 2004 season, Williams was nicknamed "The Hitman" by coach Pete Carroll for his performance on special teams; the name stuck with him for his career at USC.

During the 2005 season, Williams again backed up Sartz, but moved into the starting lineup for six games after Sartz suffered a shoulder injury; he also started twice in the middle and learned the weak-side responsibilities as well. During the 2006 season, when the Trojans fullbacks were decimated by injury, members of the offense such as Ryan Kalil, Sam Baker, and John David Booty, asked him to switch positions to fullback, a position he had played in high school. Thus Williams started twice at fullback and played several games that season on both offense and defense. Over the years, Williams played all three linebacker positions. Williams teammates voted him the team's most inspirational player in the 2007 season; he finished the regular season as the third-leading tackler among linebackers with 3½ tackles for losses, an interception and two forced fumbles on a defense that ranked second nationally.

Thomas R. Williams graduated from USC in May 2008 with a degree in sociology.

== Professional career ==
=== Pre-draft ===
Williams was invited to the NFL Combine.

=== Jacksonville Jaguars ===
Williams was selected 155th overall by the Jacksonville Jaguars in the 2008 NFL draft; he was the first person from his high school to be drafted in the NFL since Vince Newsome was drafted 97th overall in 1983. Williams signed a four-year contract with the Jaguars. He played in six games for the Jaguars in 2008, recording one tackle. He was waived on September 5, 2009.

=== Seattle Seahawks ===
Williams was signed to the Seattle Seahawks practice squad on September 8, 2009. He was released on September 30.

=== New England Patriots ===
Williams was signed to the New England Patriots practice squad on November 10, 2009. He was promoted to the Patriots' active roster on January 6, 2010, in advance of their playoff game against the Baltimore Ravens, for which he was inactive. He was waived during final cuts on September 4, 2010.

=== Buffalo Bills ===
Williams was signed to the Buffalo Bills practice squad on October 12, 2010 and later added to the active roster. He played in two games for the Bills before being waived on December 11, 2010.

=== Carolina Panthers ===
Williams was signed to the Carolina Panthers practice squad on December 15, 2010, and was released on March 13, 2012.

=== Tampa Bay Buccaneers ===
On July 26, 2012, Williams was signed to a 2-year deal by the Tampa Bay Buccaneers.
