= 2007 Rose Bowl =

American college football game

2007 Rose Bowl presented by Citi
- 93rd Rose Bowl Game
USC Trojans	Michigan Wolverines
(10–2)	(11–1)
Pac-10	Big Ten
32	18
Head coach: Pete Carroll	Head coach: Lloyd Carr
AP / Coaches / BCS; 8 / 7 / 5	AP / Coaches / BCS; 3 / 3 / 3
	1	2	3	4	Total
USC	3	0	16	13	32
Michigan	0	3	0	15	18
- Date: January 1, 2007
- Season: 2006
- Stadium: Rose Bowl
- Location: Pasadena, California
- MVP: Offensive: Dwayne Jarrett (USC WR); Defensive: Brian Cushing (USC OLB)
- Favorite: Michigan by 1.5
- National anthem: Michigan Marching Band
- Referee: Jack Childress (ACC)
- Halftime show: Michigan Marching Band; Spirit of Troy
- Attendance: 93,852
- Payout: US$17 million per team

United States TV coverage
- Network: ESPN on ABC
- Announcers: Brent Musburger, Bob Davie, Kirk Herbstreit, and Lisa Salters.

The 2007 Rose Bowl Game presented by Citi was a college football bowl game played on January 1, 2007, at the Rose Bowl in Pasadena, California. It was the 93rd Rose Bowl Game and part of the 2006–2007 Bowl Championship Series (BCS) at the conclusion of the 2006 NCAA Division I FBS football season. In the game, the University of Southern California Trojans, champions of the Pacific-10 Conference, defeated the University of Michigan Wolverines, second-place finishers in the Big Ten Conference, 32–18. USC wide receiver Dwayne Jarrett and USC outside linebacker Brian Cushing were named the Rose Bowl Players of the Game.

Historically, the Rose Bowl has pitted the champions the Big Ten and Pac-10. What made the 2007 Rose Bowl a not-so-traditional matchup is that Michigan entered as the runner-up of the Big Ten. The Big Ten champions, Ohio State, were ranked #1 and instead participated in the 2007 BCS National Championship Game. Michigan won their first 11 games in 2006, but lost their last regular season game to the undefeated Buckeyes in Columbus, 42–39.

== Pre-game ==
A moment of silence prior to the national anthem was held in memory of former Michigan center, 38th President of the United States, and 1978 Tournament of Roses Grand Marshal Gerald Ford, who died six days earlier. George Lucas, Southern California alum, the creator of the Star Wars and Indiana Jones series of films, and 2007 Tournament of Roses grand marshal, flipped the coin. The coin used featured Southern California's logo on one on side and Michigan's logo on the other. Neither team called a side as the team's logo that landed up won the coin toss. Southern California deferred after winning the coin toss, and Michigan elected to receive the ball on the kickoff. The game officially started at 2:00 pm PST (UTC−8).

== Scoring summary ==
Scoring summary

Quarter	Time	Drive			Team	Scoring information	Score	
Quarter	Time	Plays	Yards	TOP	Team	Scoring information	USC	MICH
1	4:02	10	49	4:38	USC	26-yard field goal by Mario Danelo	3	0
2	13:35	13	54	5:23	MICH	43-yard field goal by Garrett Rivas	3	3
3	8:43	4	38	1:50	USC	Chris McFoy 2-yard touchdown reception from John David Booty, Mario Danelo kick good	10	3
3	5:17	5	70	1:13	USC	Dwayne Jarrett 22-yard touchdown reception from John David Booty, Mario Danelo kick no good	16	3
3	0:48	11	23	1:19	USC	26-yard field goal by Mario Danelo	19	3
4	13:25	8	80	2:18	MICH	Adrian Arrington 11-yard touchdown reception from Chad Henne, 2-point run good	19	11
4	11:18	6	73	1:55	USC	Dwayne Jarrett 62-yard touchdown reception from John David Booty, Mario Danelo kick no good	25	11
4	6:52	4	85	1:10	USC	Steve Smith 7-yard touchdown reception from John David Booty, Mario Danelo kick good	32	11
4	1:09	6	70	1:11	MICH	Steve Breaston 41-yard touchdown reception from Chad Henne, Garrett Rivas kick good	32	18
"TOP" = time of possession. For other American football terms, see Glossary of American football.							32	18

== Game notes ==
Many times the participants of the Rose Bowl game have been the winners of the respective UCLA–USC rivalry and Michigan-Ohio State rivalry games, although there have been instances where the loser of the rivalry game still won the conference championship. In the 2007 Rose Bowl game, the participants both were the losers of those games, and Michigan was an at-large BCS participant with a second place Big Ten finish.
