= Rey Maualuga =

American football player (born 1987)

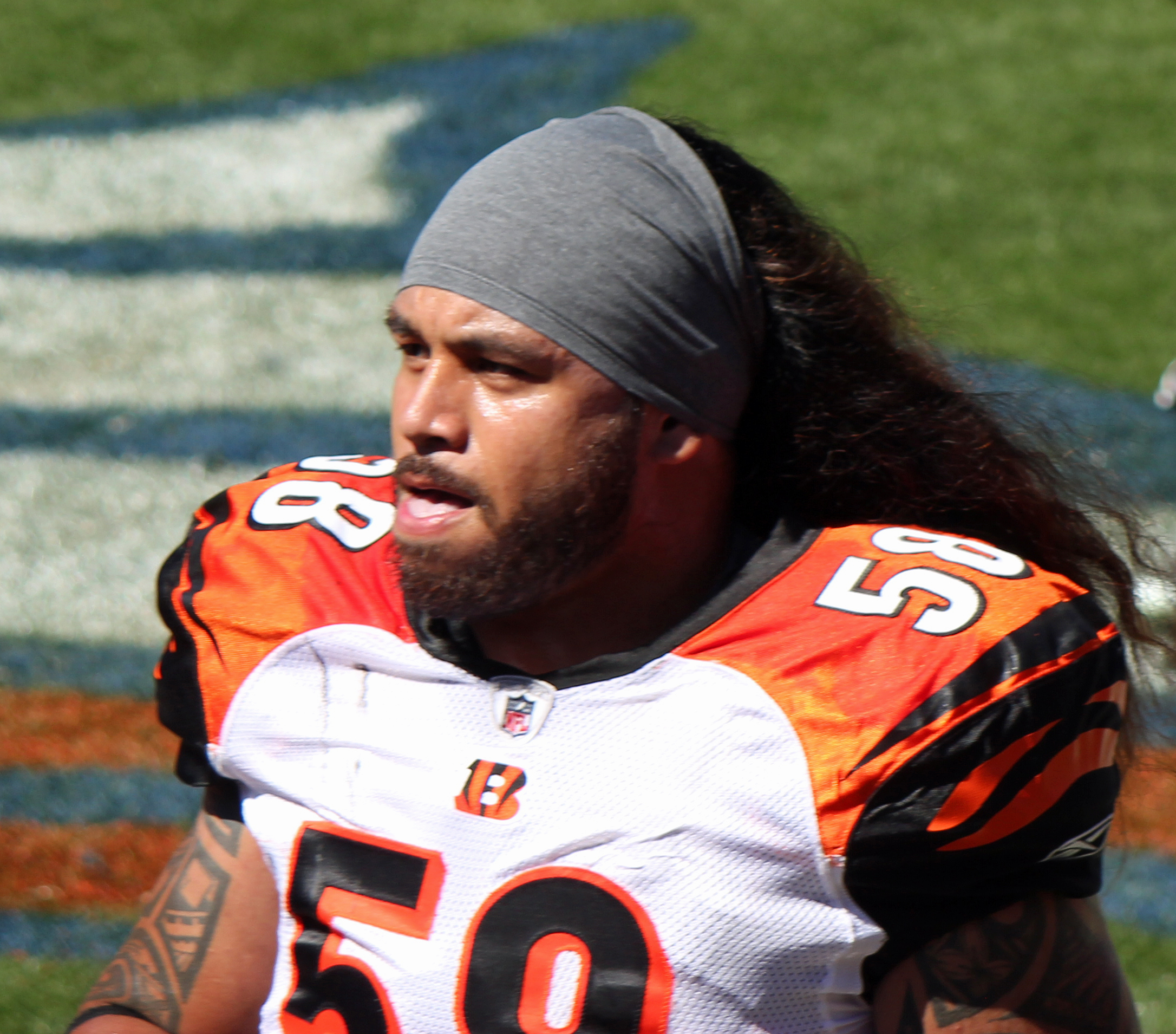
- Maualuga with the Cincinnati Bengals in 2011

No. 58
- Position: Linebacker

Personal information
- Born: January 20, 1987 (age 39); Fort Sill, Oklahoma, U.S.
- Listed height: 6 ft 2 in (1.88 m)
- Listed weight: 258 lb (117 kg)

Career information
- High school: Eureka (Eureka, California)
- College: USC (2005–2008)
- NFL draft: 2009: 2nd round, 38th overall pick

Career history
- Cincinnati Bengals (2009–2016); Miami Dolphins (2017)

Awards and highlights
- Chuck Bednarik Award (2008); Unanimous All-American (2008); Pac-10 Defensive Player of the Year (2008); 3× First-team All-Pac-10 (2006–2008)

Career NFL statistics
- Total tackles: 607
- Sacks: 4.0
- Forced fumbles: 6
- Fumble recoveries: 3
- Interceptions: 7
- Stats at Pro Football Reference

Reynold Tala Maualuga (born January 20, 1987) is an American former professional football player who was a linebacker in the National Football League (NFL). He played college football for the USC Trojans, and was recognized as a unanimous All-American. He was selected by the Cincinnati Bengals in the second round of the 2009 NFL draft. He also played for the Miami Dolphins.

== Early life ==
Maualuga attended St. Bonaventure High School in Ventura, California where he played on a team with Lorenzo Booker. He moved to Eureka, California before his sophomore year where he played with future Cincinnati Bengals wide receiver Maurice Purify. His team, the Eureka High School Loggers completed their perfect 13–0 season with a North Coast Section championship at the Redwood Bowl during his junior year. That year, he posted 146 tackles, 43 tackles for loss, 11 sacks and one interception. In his senior year he had 96 tackles, 37 tackles for loss, four interceptions (two returned for touchdowns), two fumble recoveries, and one kickoff return for a touchdown. Eureka achieved an impressive 20-2-1 win–loss–tie record during his junior and senior seasons. Following his high school senior season, Maualuga played in the by-invitation 2005 U.S. Army All-American Bowl.

=== High school honors ===
- Student Sports Junior All-American
- Cal-Hi Sports All-State Underclass first team
- PARADE All-American
- USA Today All-USA first team
- SuperPrep Elite 50
- PrepStar Top 100 Dream Team
- Student Sports Top 100
- Rivals 10
- SuperPrep All-American
- PrepStar All-American
- Tom Lemming All-American
- Scout.com All-American first team
- EA Sports All-American second team
- SuperPrep All-Farwest
- PrepStar All-West
- Long Beach Press-Telegram Best in the West first team
- Tacoma News Tribune Western 100
- The Orange County Register Fab 15 first team
- Cal-Hi Sports All-State first team honors as a senior linebacker
- U.S. Army All-American Bowl participant

== College career ==
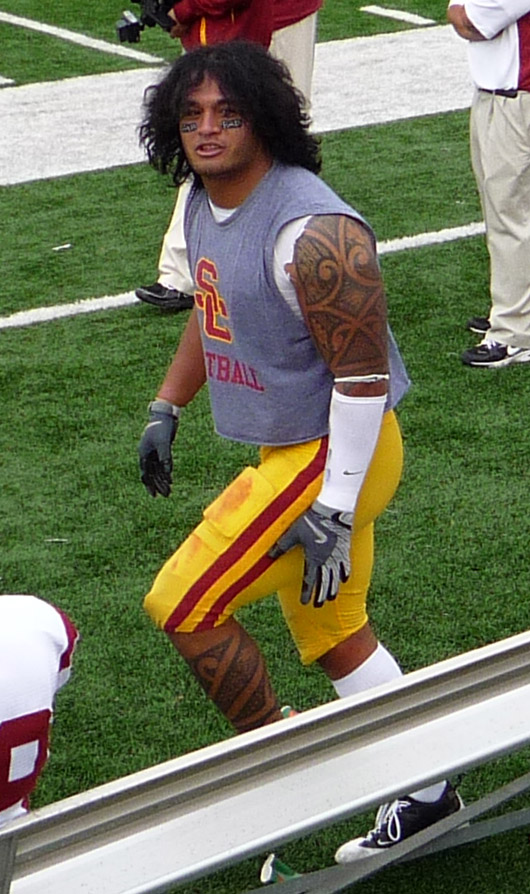
Maualuga with the USC Trojans

Maualuga attended the University of Southern California, and played for coach Pete Carroll's USC Trojans football team from 2005 to 2008. He was known for his emotional intensity both on the field and off. Carroll's Trojans had previously developed strong linebackers such as Lofa Tatupu and Keith Rivers, as well as Maualuga's fellow senior teammates Brian Cushing, Kaluka Maiava and Clay Matthews III, which were touted as one of the most talented linebacker corps in college football.

As a freshman in 2005, Maualuga earned Freshman All-American first-team honors from the Football Writers Association of America and Scout.com; also he won USC's John McKay Award (most competitive spirit). Off the field his career started with occasional spirited and reckless partying that led to an October 2005 incident where he got into a fight at a Halloween party and was arrested for misdemeanor battery. He agreed in an arraignment diversion program that included counseling, Alcoholics Anonymous meetings and community service resulting in the charges being dismissed. Maualuga later noted that: "You learn that you're only given a certain number of chances. If you keep going back to the same things you were doing, it shows that you don't learn from anything."

In 2006, Maualuga returned in full form and was nominated for the Butkus Award and second team All-Pac-10. He made his first start in place of injured senior Oscar Lua against Nebraska.

Maualuga was considered a top choice for the 2008 NFL draft, but he decided to stay for his senior year in college.

At the end of the 2007 regular season, Maualuga was selected to the All-Pacific-10 Conference first team for the second year in a row by league coaches. He was the defensive player-of-the-game in the 2008 Rose Bowl.

Maualuga wears jersey number 58, which was previously worn by former Trojan linebacker and NFL Pro Bowl player Lofa Tatupu, who, like Maualuga, is also of Samoan descent. Mindful of his heritage, Maualuga displays many bold, warrior-like Polynesian tattoos on his arms and legs. Some NFL scouts have compared Maualuga to former Trojan and NFL linebacker Junior Seau and former Trojan and retired Pittsburgh Steelers safety Troy Polamalu, both of Samoan descent, for their sideline-to-sideline aggressive style of defense play, and Polamalu's shared preference for displaying long Polynesian warrior-style hair tucked under their football helmet.

In addition to being named the 2008 winner of the Chuck Bednarik Award, Maualuga was recognized as a unanimous first-team All-American, receiving first-team honors from the Associated Press, American Football Coaches Association, Football Writers Association of America, Sporting News, Walter Camp Football Foundation, CBS Sportsline.com, College Football News, ESPN and Rivals.com. Maualuga was also chosen to participate in the 2009 Senior Bowl with some of his other USC teammates.

== Professional career ==
=== Pre-draft ===
Maualuga was one of twelve graduating 2008 senior USC players, including the four senior linebackers (Maualuga, Cushing, Maiava, and Matthews), invited to the 2009 NFL Scouting Combine.

Pre-draft measurables
Height	Weight	Arm length	Hand span	40-yard dash	10-yard split	20-yard split	20-yard shuttle	Vertical jump	Broad jump	Bench press	Wonderlic
6 ft 1 3/4 in (1.87 m)	249 lb (113 kg)	31 3/4 in (0.81 m)	10 in (0.25 m)	4.58 s	1.57 s	2.65 s	4.35 s	31.0 in (0.79 m)	9 ft 6 in (2.90 m)	23 reps	15
All values from NFL Combine/USC's Pro Day

In the lead up to the 2009 NFL draft, Maualuga was ranked as one of the top middle linebackers entering the draft, alongside Ohio State's James Laurinaitis. USC linebackers Maualuga, Cushing, and Matthews were all featured on the cover of Sports Illustrated's 2009 NFL Draft Preview magazine, as all three were regarded as potential first round selections.

=== Cincinnati Bengals ===
Despite being projected as a first-round pick, Maualuga was picked in the second round by the Cincinnati Bengals. He was projected by some, and expecting, to go 16th overall to the San Diego Chargers, who instead opted to select hybrid linebacker/defensive end Larry English out of Northern Illinois. After being selected, Maualuga cried as he gave thanks to his late father and said he was thankful for his opportunity as "Nothing like this was ever expected for our family." His selection came one year after the Bengals used a first-round pick to select Maualuga's college teammate, linebacker Keith Rivers.

On December 30, 2009, Maualuga was placed on injured reserve due to a dislocated elbow. He finished his rookie season with 64 tackles, one sack, three forced fumbles, and three pass deflections in 15 games started.

On November 16, 2012, Maualuga was fined $15,750 for unnecessary roughness against the New York Giants.

Maualuga signed a new two-year, $6.5 million contract with the Bengals on March 18, 2013.

On March 25, 2017, Maualuga was released by the Bengals.

=== Miami Dolphins ===
On August 19, 2017, Maualuga signed with the Miami Dolphins. He was released on November 18, 2017, following his arrest the previous night.

=== NFL statistics ===
Year	Team	GP	COMB	TOTAL	AST	SACK	FF	FR	FR YDS	INT	IR YDS	AVG IR	LNG	TD	PD
2009	CIN	15	63	39	24	1.0	3	0	0	0	0	0	0	0	2
2010	CIN	16	75	44	31	1.0	0	0	0	2	58	29	47	0	2
2011	CIN	13	88	53	35	0.0	3	1	0	1	2	2	2	0	2
2012	CIN	16	122	62	60	1.0	0	1	0	0	0	0	0	0	4
2013	CIN	13	75	52	23	1.0	0	0	0	1	14	14	14	0	2
2014	CIN	12	59	33	26	0.0	0	0	0	1	4	4	4	0	4
2015	CIN	15	75	43	32	0.0	0	0	0	1	15	15	15	0	3
2016	CIN	14	27	17	10	0.0	0	0	0	1	9	9	9	0	2
2017	MIA	6	23	14	9	0.0	0	0	0	0	0	0	0	0	0
Career		120	607	357	250	4.0	6	2	0	7	102	15	47	0	21

== Personal life ==
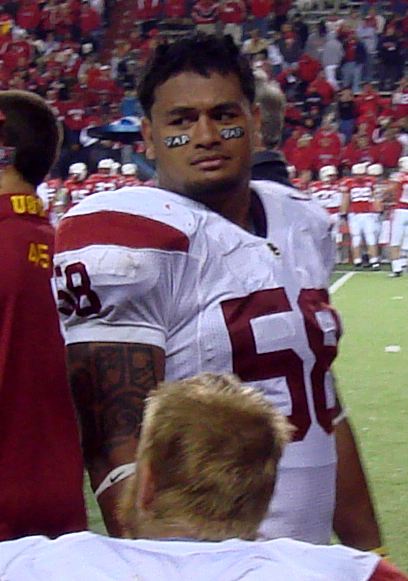
After his father died, Maualuga began honoring him with a message on his eye blacks.

Maualuga was born at Reynolds Army Community Hospital in Fort Sill, Oklahoma, to American Samoan parents, Talatonu and Tina Maualuga. His father, Talatonu, was in Oklahoma serving with the United States Army. Within a few months, the family moved to Waipahu, Hawaii, on the island of Oahu. Financially, the family struggled in Hawaii. While in sixth grade, Maualuga started playing football because he saw the popular kids played football and carried their pads and helmets to school. Not only was Maualuga passionate about football, he also had a love for attending church with his family. His family attended First Samoan Full Gospel Pentecostal Church in Waipahu and Moanalua, where Rey was a member of the FSFGPC youth group. After sixth grade, his family moved to Oxnard, California as his father pursued Pentecostal ministry. He spent his first year of high school in nearby Ventura before moving up to Eureka in Northern California where his father practiced ministry.

During Maualuga's freshman year he wrote "RIP" on the eye black paint under his right eye and "DAD" under his left eye in honor of his dad who died two days before the BCS National Championship Game following the 2005 season. His dad died after battling brain cancer, and from at least his junior season, black eye paint under both eyes read "DAD" in silver. He has two younger brothers.

Maualuga also played fictional NFL player Popo Vanauta in the 2014 baseball film Million Dollar Arm.

He has one daughter.

== Legal troubles ==
Maualuga was arrested on January 29, 2010, on charges of drunken driving and careless driving at the Kenton County jail in Covington, Kentucky. That same day, the TMZ website published a photo purportedly showing Maulauga's arrest at the crash scene, and reported that Maualuga's blood alcohol level at the time of the crash was about double the legal limit. On February 2, 2010, Maualuga pleaded guilty to the drunken driving charge. He was given a 7-day suspended jail sentence, two years probation, drivers' license suspension for 90 days, and fined $350. He apologized for his actions when he made his plea.

On November 18, 2017, Maualuga was arrested for battery in Miami, Florida. He was accused for grabbing and shoving a man, who was deemed to be an employee at an E11EVEN nightclub, over a $40 bar tab dispute. Shortly thereafter, the Miami Dolphins waived Maualuga.

On July 20, 2020, Maualuga was arrested for intoxicated driving and reckless driving in Villa Hills, Kentucky.

On August 12, 2021, Maualuga was arrested for operating a motor vehicle while under the influence, criminal mischief, and wanton endangerment in Villa Hills, Kentucky. Police said that Maualuga drove through multiple yards and ran over mailboxes before hitting a parked car. Maualuga hit the parked car so hard that part of his Mercedes went underneath it and wedged it between a tree. Maualuga spent 120 days in jail, completed an in-patient substance abuse program, and was entered into a pre-trial diversion program by which the charges will be dismissed if he meets the requirements of the program. On May 7, 2024, Maualuga celebrated 1000 days of sobriety.
