= Ryan Powdrell =

American football player (born 1983)

No. 39, 43
- Position: Fullback

Personal information
- Born: December 20, 1983 (age 42); Rancho Santa Margarita, California, U.S.
- Listed height: 5 ft 11 in (1.80 m)
- Listed weight: 255 lb (116 kg)

Career information
- College: Southern California
- NFL draft: 2007: undrafted

Career history
- Green Bay Packers (2007); Tampa Bay Buccaneers (2008)*; Pittsburgh Steelers (2009)*; Seattle Seahawks (2010)*; Omaha Nighthawks (2010)
- * Offseason or practice squad member only

Awards and highlights
- Consensus JUCO All-American (2003)

Ryan Marcus Powdrell (born December 20, 1983) is an American former professional football fullback. He was signed by the Green Bay Packers as an undrafted free agent in 2007. He played college football at Southern California, and was also a member of the Tampa Bay Buccaneers, Pittsburgh Steelers, and Seattle Seahawks.

== Early life ==
Prior to his HS days Ryan played on some talented Pop Warner teams as a tailback, corner, and punter. Having played numerous positions started but did not stop in his youth days.

Powdrell prepped at powerhouse Mission Viejo High School where he graduated in 2002 playing Middle Linebacker & Fullback. He helped lead Mission Viejo to their first of four consecutive CIF-SS Championship game appearances in his senior season (2001) an 18-9 win over Chino High School. Powdrell also prepped with fellow Trojans Drew Radovich and Mark Sanchez

== College career ==
Powdrell played college football at the University of Southern California after transferring from Saddleback College in Mission Viejo, California. Switched from linebacker to fullback before his first season with USC, Powdrell rushed for 9 yards on 2 carries, and caught 4 passes for 72 yards and a touchdown in USC Trojans' 2006 season opening 50-14 win against the Arkansas Razorbacks but suffered a season-ending injury early in the second game against Nebraska.

== Professional career ==
=== Green Bay Packers ===
After going undrafted in the 2007 NFL draft, Powdrell signed with the Green Bay Packers on May 4, 2007. He spent his rookie season on injured reserve. Powdrell was released by the Packers on August 25, 2008.

=== Tampa Bay Buccaneers ===
Powdrell was signed to the practice squad of the Tampa Bay Buccaneers on October 15, 2008. He was released on October 22.

=== Pittsburgh Steelers ===
Powdrell was signed by the Pittsburgh Steelers on February 12, 2009. He was released on June 18, 2009.

=== Seattle Seahawks ===
Powdrell signed with the Seattle Seahawks on April 15, 2010. Powdrell was released on August 7, 2010 due to a calf injury he sustained in practice.

=== Omaha Nighthawks ===
Powdrell was signed by the Omaha Nighthawks of the United Football League on September 2, 2010, but was released by the Nighthawks the next day after Powdrell re-injured his calf.

== Personal life ==
Powdrell currently resides in Wareham, Massachusetts. Powdrell currently plays for the Taunton Gladiators, a premier semi-pro football team based out of Taunton, Massachusetts. Powdrell led Taunton to the 2010 Eastern Football League Championship with a 32-21 victory over the Clinton Irish Blizzard.

Powdrell led Taunton back to the EFL Championship Game in 2011, but were defeated 20-9 by their neighboring rival, the Middleboro Cobras. The Middleboro Cobras are considered a powerhouse football team, and are viewed as one of the best semi-pro football organizations in the country.
