= Brian Cushing =

American football player and coach (born 1987)

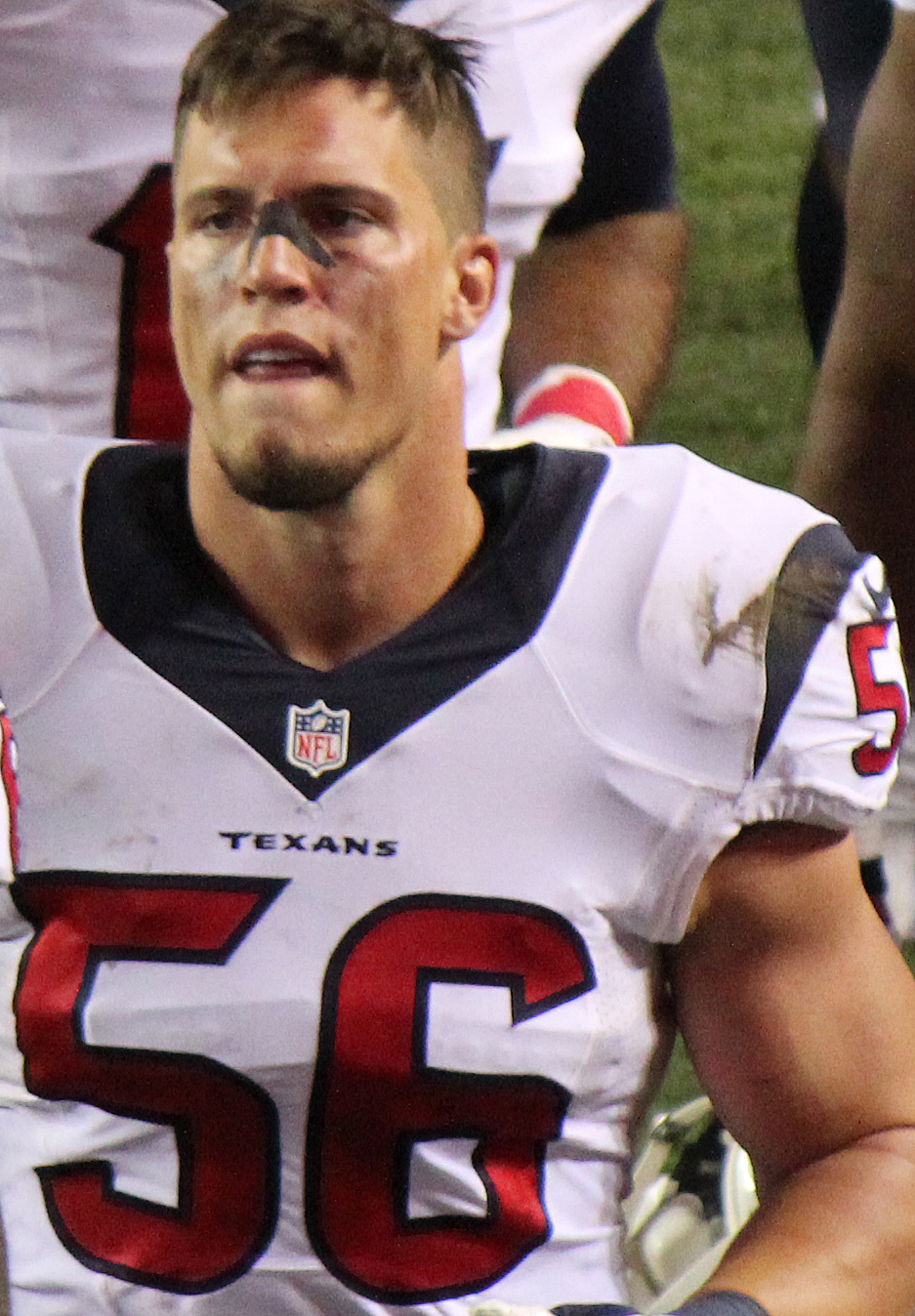
- Cushing with the Houston Texans in 2014

No. 56
- Position: Linebacker

Personal information
- Born: January 24, 1987 (age 39); Park Ridge, New Jersey, U.S.
- Listed height: 6 ft 3 in (1.91 m)
- Listed weight: 250 lb (113 kg)

Career information
- High school: Bergen Catholic (Oradell, New Jersey)
- College: USC (2005–2008)
- NFL draft: 2009: 1st round, 15th overall pick

Career history

Playing
- Houston Texans (2009–2017)

Coaching
- Houston Texans (2019–2020) Assistant strength and conditioning coach

Awards and highlights
- As player: NFL Defensive Rookie of the Year (2009); Second-team All-Pro (2011); Pro Bowl (2009); PFWA All-Rookie Team (2009); First-team All-American (2008); First-team All-Pac-10 (2008); Second-team All-Pac-10 (2006)

Career NFL statistics
- Total tackles: 664
- Sacks: 13.5
- Forced fumbles: 9
- Pass deflections: 30
- Interceptions: 8
- Defensive touchdowns: 1
- Stats at Pro Football Reference

Brian Patrick Cushing (born January 24, 1987) is an American former professional football player who was a linebacker for the Houston Texans of the National Football League (NFL). He played college football for the USC Trojans, and was selected by the Texans in the first round of the 2009 NFL draft. He played his entire nine-year career with Houston from 2009 to 2017 and became the team's all-time leading tackler.

== Early life ==
Cushing trained throughout his childhood in Park Ridge, New Jersey. He attended Bergen Catholic High School in Oradell, New Jersey and went on to lead the Crusaders to the 2004 Group IV State Championship as a linebacker, tight end, and running back against Don Bosco Preparatory High School, providing huge plays in the 13–10 win. He was named "2004 North Jersey Player of the Year" by The Record, and played in the 2005 U.S. Army All-American Bowl alongside future USC teammates Patrick Turner, Rey Maualuga, and Mark Sanchez.

Cushing was recruited by top colleges, including Notre Dame, Georgia, and Penn State before eventually committing to the University of Southern California.

== College career ==
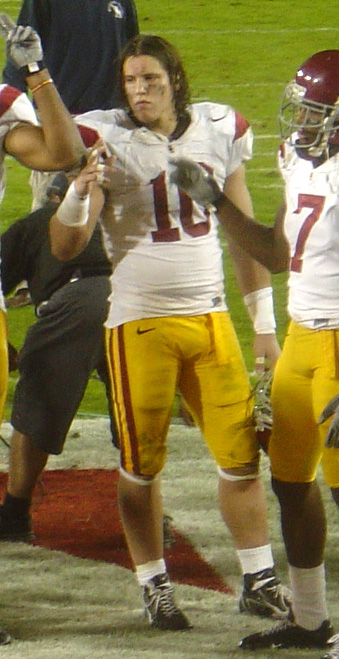
Cushing celebrating a 2006 victory over Stanford.

Cushing attended the University of Southern California and played for the USC Trojans football team from 2005 to 2008 under head coach Pete Carroll. Cushing shared the No. 10 jersey with Trojans starting quarterback John David Booty from 2005 to 2007.

Cushing was on Phil Steele's 2007 pre-season All-America team and on the 2007 Bednarik Award and Lott Trophy watch lists.

Cushing returned a failed onside kick attempted by Notre Dame at the Los Angeles Memorial Coliseum for a late fourth-quarter touchdown on November 25, 2006.

On January 1, 2007, Cushing was named the Defensive MVP of the Rose Bowl Game, after recording 2 1/2 sacks and forcing a third-quarter fumble that changed the momentum of the game.

Cushing was named AP 2nd Team All-American as a senior despite having pedestrian statistics (73 tackles, 10 1/2 tackles for loss, and 3 sacks). NFL scouts did not admire Cushing for his statistics, but for his versatility. Fast enough to play inside and outside linebacker and big and strong enough to play defensive end.

Cushing was one of twelve senior USC players, including the four senior linebackers Cushing, Kaluka Maiava, Clay Matthews III and Rey Maualuga, invited to the 2009 NFL Scouting Combine. He also participated in the 2009 Senior Bowl with Maualuga, Matthews, Patrick Turner and others. Alongside fellow USC linebackers Maualuga and Matthews, he was featured on the cover of Sports Illustrated's 2009 NFL Draft Preview magazine, as all three were regarded as potential first-round selections.

Cushing, along with Archie Griffin of Ohio State University, are the only two players in college football history to have competed in the Rose Bowl as starters in all four seasons of their college careers.

=== College awards and honors ===
- 2005 Scout.com Freshman All-American
- 2006 All-Pac-10 Second-team
- 2007 All-Pac-10 Honorable Mention
- 2007 Rose Bowl Defensive MVP
- 2008 All-Pac-10 First-team selection by the conference's head coaches and Rivals.com
- 2008 Rivals.com First-team All-American
- 2008 SI.com First-team All-American
- 2008 Associated Press First-team All-American

== Professional career ==
Pre-draft measurables
Height	Weight	Arm length	Hand span	40-yard dash	10-yard split	20-yard split	20-yard shuttle	Three-cone drill	Vertical jump	Broad jump	Bench press	Wonderlic
6 ft 2 7/8 in (1.90 m)	243 lb (110 kg)	32 1/2 in (0.83 m)	10 in (0.25 m)	4.66 s	1.58 s	2.71 s	4.14 s	6.84 s	35 in (0.89 m)	10 ft 0 in (3.05 m)	30 reps	23
All values from NFL Combine/Pro Day

=== 2009 season ===
Cushing was selected in the first round with the 15th overall pick in the 2009 NFL draft by the Houston Texans. He had one of the best defensive seasons by a rookie in NFL history.

He scored his first career points on October 4, 2009, when he recorded a safety against the Oakland Raiders. This was the first recorded safety by a Texan since the 2002 season.

Cushing was named AFC Defensive Player of the Week for Week 6 of the 2009 NFL season, becoming the first rookie to earn the award in the 2009 season. In Week 8, Cushing was again named AFC Defensive Player of the Week, becoming the first Texans rookie to win the award twice in one season. Cushing was also named the NFL Defensive Rookie of the Month for November 2009.

Cushing finished tied with Ray Lewis for the AFC lead with 133 tackles and added 4 sacks, 10 pass deflections, 4 interceptions, and 2 forced fumbles. He was selected to the 2010 Pro Bowl as a starter. Cushing was one of three rookies to make it to the Pro Bowl, another being a former USC teammate (Clay Matthews).

On January 5, 2010, Cushing was named the NFL Defensive Rookie of the Year. Cushing is the second Texan to win the award, the first being DeMeco Ryans in 2006.

=== 2010 season ===
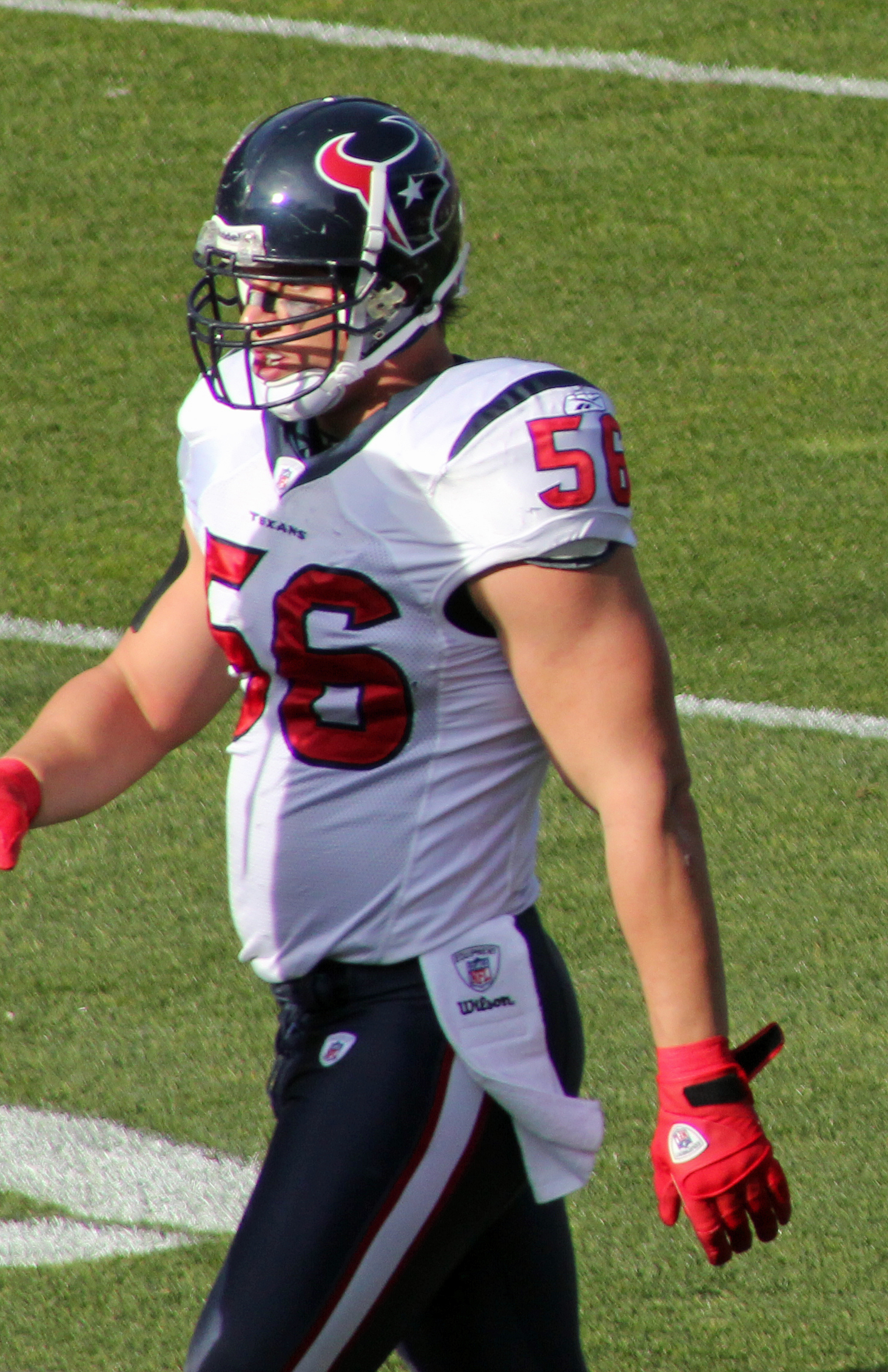
Cushing in 2010.

On May 7, 2010, Adam Schefter of ESPN reported that Cushing would be suspended for the first four games of the 2010 season for violating the NFL's performance-enhancing substances policy, after he tested positive in September 2009 for having above-normal levels of the human chorionic gonadotropin (hCG) hormone in his system. Cushing had previously denied rumors of having used performance-enhancing substances prior to being drafted. He then stated that he would undergo further medical tests to determine how hCG entered his system. Cushing still denies that he ever ingested or injected any performance enhancers and claimed the test result could have been from a cancerous tumor.

On May 12, 2010, in a revote of the AP Defensive Rookie of the Year award after his suspension was made public, Cushing again received the most votes, thus retaining his award. His second-team All-Pro status from his rookie season, however, was rescinded by the AP.

In the final 12 games, he totaled 76 tackles, 1+1/2 sacks, 4 pass deflections, and 1 forced fumble.

=== 2011 season ===
During training camp heading into the 2011 season, Cushing was told that he would be switching from outside to inside linebacker due to the new 3–4 defense. They believed that he would not have the speed to get to the outside, despite the fact that he had always been an outside linebacker all through high school.

In 2011, the Houston Texans finished the season with a 10–6 record and made it to the playoffs for the first time in team history. Cushing was named Team MVP and while he wasn't voted to the Pro-Bowl he earned AP 2nd Team All-Pro honors after finishing the season with 114 tackles, 4 sacks, 5 pass deflections, 2 interceptions, and 2 forced fumbles. Houston Texans defensive coordinator, Wade Phillips, called Cushing a "holy phenom" and also said that "he's one of the best I've ever coached, and I've been at it a long time." Cushing said that he will use the fact that he did not make the Pro-Bowl as "motivation and a driving force" to become better. The Texans defeated the Cincinnati Bengals 31–10 in the first round but were defeated by the Baltimore Ravens 20–13 in the Divisional Round.

=== 2012 season ===
During the second quarter of the Houston Texans win over the New York Jets on Monday October 8, 2012, Cushing left the game with what appeared to be a knee injury, which was later confirmed to be a torn ACL. He was placed on injured reserve, ending his 2012 season.

=== 2013 season ===
Cushing inked a six-year deal with the Houston Texans, a contract extension worth $55.6 million, which included $21 million guaranteed. Averaging $9.2 million for the next six years, the contract was the largest at the time for any inside linebacker, and made him the third highest paid inside linebacker in the NFL.

During the October 20, 2013, game against Kansas City, Cushing broke his fibula and tore his fibular collateral ligament after a low block from Chiefs running back Jamaal Charles in the third quarter. The Texans later announced that he would miss the remainder of the season.

=== 2014 season ===
Cushing started the 2014 NFL season well despite being brought along slowly at the start of the season, collecting 37 tackles in the first four games as the Texans opened with an impressive 3–1 record. Cushing had 17 tackles in their loss to the New York Giants, tying the franchise record for tackles in a game.

=== 2015 season ===
After being plagued by injuries in the previous two seasons, Cushing completed the 2015 season with 110 tackles. The Texans qualified for the first round of the playoffs but fell to the Kansas City Chiefs 30–0.

=== 2016 season ===
During Week 1 against the Chicago Bears on September 11, 2016, Cushing suffered a partially torn MCL but he did not require surgery.

=== 2017 season ===
On September 13, 2017, Cushing was suspended for ten games for again violating the NFL's policy on performance-enhancing substances.

On February 20, 2018, Cushing was released by the Texans after nine seasons as the franchise's all-time leading tackler.

== NFL career statistics ==
=== Regular season ===
Year	Team	GP	GS	Tackles					Interceptions						FF
Year	Team	GP	GS	Comb	Solo	Ast	Sck	Sfty	PD	Int	Yds	Avg	Lng	TD	FF
2009	HOU	16	16	133	86	47	4.0	1	10	4	26	6.5	20	—	2
2010	HOU	12	12	76	53	23	1.5	—	4	—	—	—	—	—	1
2011	HOU	16	16	114	76	38	4.0	—	5	2	5	2.5	5	—	2
2012	HOU	5	5	30	23	7	—	—	2	1	1	1.0	1	—	1
2013	HOU	7	7	48	36	12	1.5	—	3	1	18	18.0	18T	1	1
2014	HOU	14	14	72	41	31	1.0	—	2	—	—	—	—	—	1
2015	HOU	16	16	110	63	47	—	—	3	—	—	—	—	—	1
2016	HOU	13	13	65	38	27	—	—	1	—	—	—	—	—	—
2017	HOU	5	5	16	8	8	1.5	—	—	—	—	—	—	—	—
Total		104	104	664	424	240	13.5	1	30	8	50	6.0	20	1	9

=== Playoffs ===
Year	Team	GP	GS	Tackles					Interceptions						FF
Year	Team	GP	GS	Comb	Solo	Ast	Sck	Sfty	PD	Int	Yds	Avg	Lng	TD	FF
2011	HOU	2	2	19	10	9	—	—	1	—	—	—	—	—	—
2012	HOU	0	0	Did not play due to injury											
2015	HOU	1	1	13	9	4	—	—	1	1	—	—	—	—	—
2016	HOU	2	2	8	3	5	1.0	—	—	—	—	—	—	—	—
Total		5	5	40	22	18	1.0	—	2	1	—	—	—	—	—

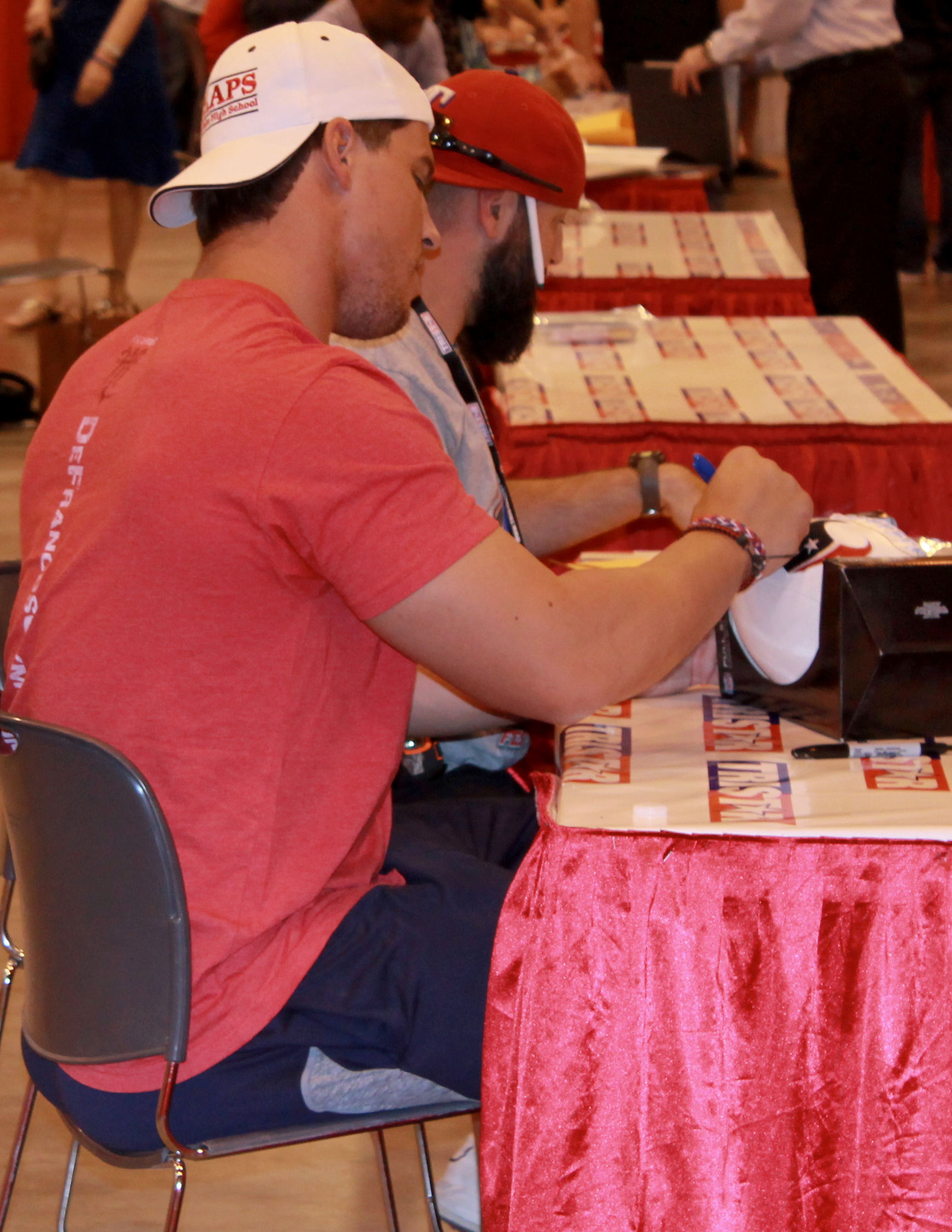
Cushing signs autographs at a Houston sports collectors show in June 2014.

=== NFL awards and honors ===
- 2× AFC Defensive Rookie of the Month (November 2009 & December 2009)
- 2× AFC Defensive Player of the Week (2009 weeks 6 & 8)
- 2009 AFC Defensive Player of the Month of November
- 2009 Pro Bowl selection (starter)
- 2009 SN-2nd Team All-Pro
- 2009 All-Rookie Selection (Sporting News, Pro Football Writers Association)
- 2009 NFL Defensive Rookie of the Year
- 2011 Team Captain
- 2011 Team MVP
- 2011 AP-2nd Team All-Pro
- Ranked No. 54 in the Top 100 Players of 2012

== Coaching career ==
On January 29, 2019, Cushing was hired to work with strength and conditioning coaches and offer some assistance to players on defense with the Texans.

== Personal life ==
Cushing's mother, Antoinette, is of Polish descent; she was born in 1944 at a German forced labor camp. His father, Frank, was an intelligence officer in the Vietnam War. His great great uncle was American Civil War veteran Alonzo Cushing, who was killed at the Battle of Gettysburg and posthumously received the Medal of Honor. His brother Michael, was an AP-1st Team All-American in both his junior & senior year seasons (95 & 96), playing Division 1 Rugby at Providence College.1996 SI.com First-team All-American.

Cushing is married to his college sweetheart Megan Ohai, an athlete who had success on USC's women's soccer squad; they began dating just prior to Cushing's NFL draft. His sister-in-law is soccer player Kealia Ohai, who is married to his former Texans teammate J. J. Watt. The Cushings have three sons together.
