= Brandon Hancock =

American football player and sports journalist (born 1983)

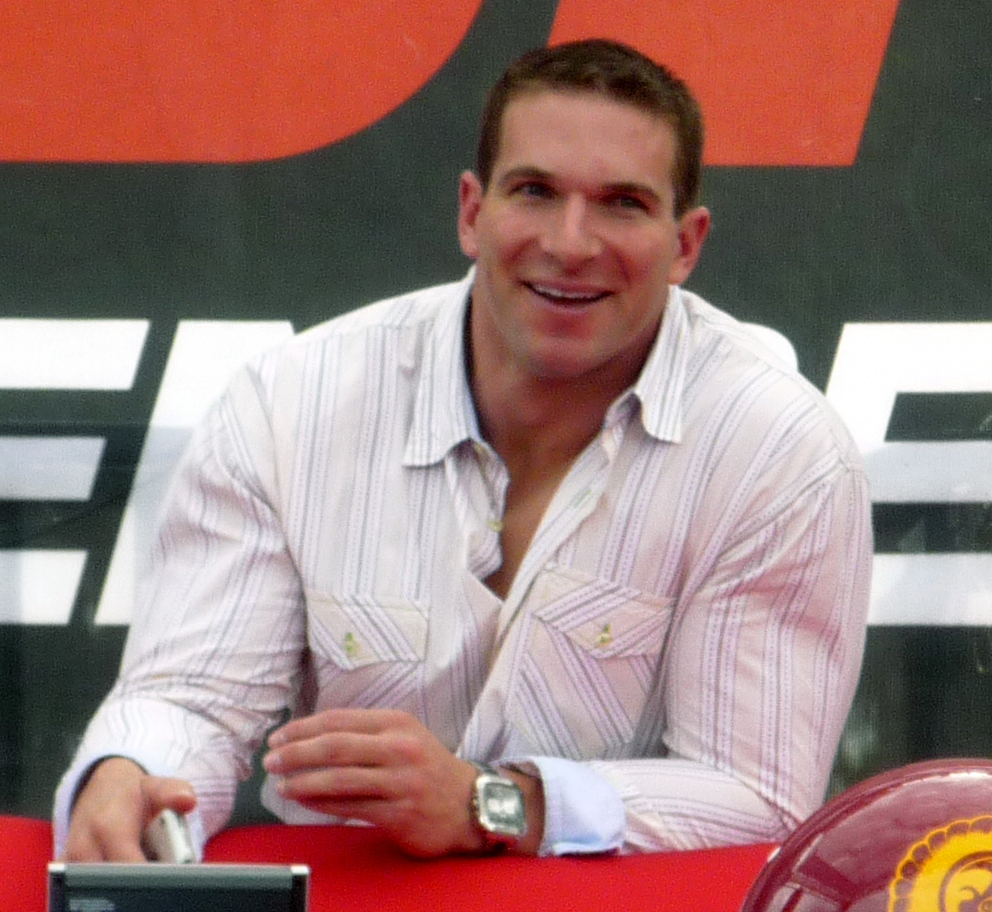
Brandon Hancock on the set of an ESPN Radio 710 broadcast from outside the Los Angeles Memorial Coliseum

Brandon Hancock (born June 13, 1983) is an American sports journalist and former football player at the position of fullback, who played for the University of Southern California Trojans football team.

== Early life ==
Hancock attended Clovis West High School (Fresno, California) and was a student and a letterman in football. In football, he won All-League and All-CIF honors. Hancock graduated from Clovis West High School in 2002 as Valedictorian. He narrowed his college choices between USC and Stanford, ultimately choosing the Trojans because of the school's proximity to the entertainment industry, as well as Trojan head coach Pete Carroll.

== College career ==
He majored in communications at the University of Southern California where he graduated with a 3.91 GPA and was a member of Phi Beta Kappa; he was also a member of the debate team. He is currently obtaining his master's degree in Communication Management and Entertainment from the USC Annenberg School for Communication. He works part-time at ESPN Radio 710 AM for USC Trojans games, is a post-game anchor/analyst for KABC-TV in Los Angeles, and has appeared on Fox Sports.

== Personal life ==
Hancock began bodybuilding at age 13, and earned the nickname "the Hulk". He grew in size and went from playing quarterback to linebacker to fullback. He has appeared in Flex, Muscle & Fitness, Men's Health, and Muscle Magazine International.
