= Cary Harris =

American football player (born 1987)

No. 47
- Position: Defensive back

Personal information
- Born: March 22, 1987 (age 39); Los Angeles, California, U.S.
- Listed height: 6 ft 0 in (1.83 m)
- Listed weight: 180 lb (82 kg)

Career information
- High school: Notre Dame (Sherman Oaks, California)
- College: Southern California
- NFL draft: 2009: 6th round, 183rd overall pick

Career history
- Buffalo Bills (2009–2010); Minnesota Vikings (2010)*; Cincinnati Bengals (2010)*; New York Giants (2011)*; Edmonton Eskimos (2013)*
- * Offseason or practice squad member only
- Stats at Pro Football Reference

Cary Harris (born March 22, 1987) is an American former professional football safety. He was selected by the Buffalo Bills in the sixth round of the 2009 NFL draft. He played college football at Southern California as a cornerback.

Harris was also a member of the Minnesota Vikings, Cincinnati Bengals, New York Giants, and Edmonton Eskimos.

== Early life ==
Harris prepped at Notre Dame High School in Sherman Oaks, California where he played running back and cornerback and ran a 10.75 100 meter dash in track.

== College career ==
Harris was a three-year starter between 2006 and 2008. He played reserve in 2005. He was a two-time All-Pac-10 honorable mention player in 2007 and 2008 and was considered a top cornerback for the 2009 NFL draft.

Harris was one of twelve USC players invited to the 2009 NFL Scouting Combine that season.

== Professional football ==
=== Buffalo Bills ===
Harris was drafted by the Buffalo Bills in the sixth round (183rd overall) of the 2009 NFL draft. He was waived during final cuts on September 5, 2009, but was re-signed to the team's practice squad on September 6. He was promoted to the active roster on November 20, and recorded two interceptions in the final game of the 2009 season against the Indianapolis Colts. He was re-signed on March 29, 2010.

He was released by the Bills on October 22, 2010, and worked out for the Philadelphia Eagles shortly afterward, but was not offered a contract.

=== Minnesota Vikings ===
On November 24, 2010, Harris was signed to the Minnesota Vikings' practice squad, but was released on December 1.

=== Cincinnati Bengals ===
Harris was signed to the Cincinnati Bengals' practice squad on December 14, 2010.

=== New York Giants ===
Harris signed a reserve/future contract with the New York Giants on January 13, 2011. He was waived/injured on August 16 and later reverted to injured reserve. He was released with an injury settlement on August 28.

=== Edmonton Eskimos ===
Harris later signed with the Edmonton Eskimos. He was released on June 23, 2013.

== Coaching career ==
Harris currently is the head football coach at Calabasas High School, (Calabasas, California).
