= Drew Radovich =

American football player (born 1985)

Profile
- Position: Offensive tackle

Personal information
- Born: June 20, 1985 (age 41); Mission Viejo, California, U.S.
- Listed height: 6 ft 5 in (1.96 m)
- Listed weight: 305 lb (138 kg)

Career information
- High school: Mission Viejo
- College: Southern California
- NFL draft: 2008: undrafted

Career history
- Minnesota Vikings (2008); San Francisco 49ers (2009)*; Indianapolis Colts (2009)*; Minnesota Vikings (2009–2010)*
- * Offseason or practice squad member only

Drew Radovich (born June 20, 1985) is an American former professional football offensive tackle. He played college football at Southern California.

Radovich was a member of the Minnesota Vikings, San Francisco 49ers and Indianapolis Colts.

== Early life ==
He graduated from Mission Viejo High School where Ryan Powdrell and Mark Sanchez went. He played in the 2003 U.S. Army All-American Bowl.

== Professional career ==
=== Minnesota Vikings (first stint) ===
On April 27, 2008, Radovich was signed as an undrafted free agent by the Minnesota Vikings.

Radovich made the 53 man active roster his rookie year. He suffered a shoulder injury during his first preseason game against the Seahawks. Midway through the season, Radovich was placed on IR and underwent shoulder surgery to focus on entering the 2009 fully healthy. Radovich was cut in early September 2009.

=== San Francisco 49ers ===
Radovich was signed to the San Francisco 49ers practice squad September 2009 where he spent half of the season until being released to make room for an injury to another position group.

=== Indianapolis Colts ===
Radovich was signed to the Indianapolis Colts' practice squad on December 2, 2009.

=== Minnesota Vikings (second stint) ===
Radovich was re-signed to the Vikings practice squad on December 9.

He played in all four preseason games, starting the fourth and final game against the Dallas Cowboys.

Radovich was cut from the Vikings on September 4, 2010.
