= Chauncey Washington =

American football player (born 1985)

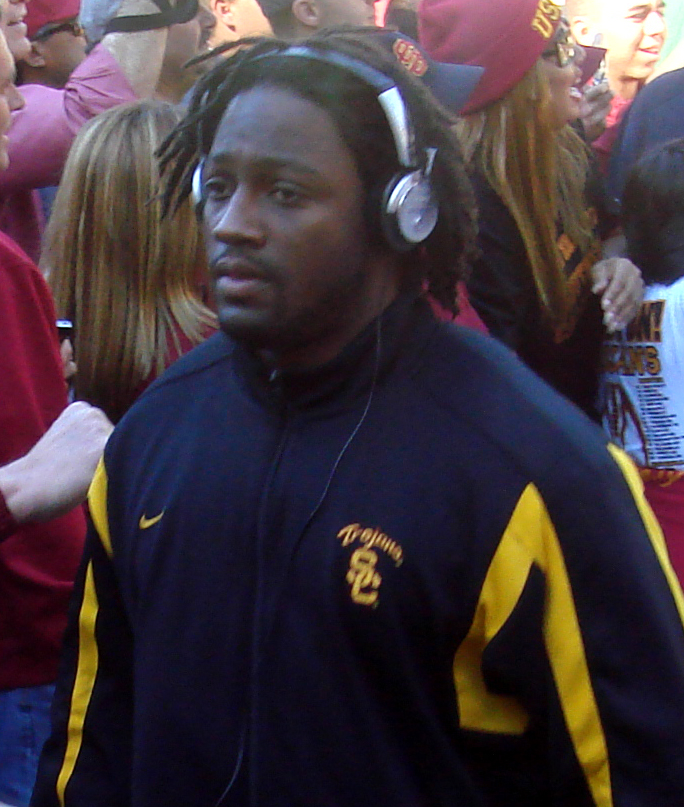
- Washington with the USC Trojans in 2007

No. 34, 31, 33, 30
- Position: Running back

Personal information
- Born: April 29, 1985 (age 41); Carson, California, U.S.
- Listed height: 6 ft 1 in (1.85 m)
- Listed weight: 215 lb (98 kg)

Career information
- High school: South (Torrance, California)
- College: USC
- NFL draft: 2008: 7th round, 213th overall pick

Career history
- Jacksonville Jaguars (2008); Dallas Cowboys (2009); New York Jets (2009–2010); St. Louis Rams (2010); Dallas Cowboys (2011)

Career NFL statistics
- Rushing attempts: 5
- Rushing yards: 8
- Receptions: 3
- Receiving yards: 22
- Stats at Pro Football Reference

Chauncey Jamal Tolbert Washington (born April 29, 1985) is an American former professional football player who was a running back in the National Football League (NFL) for the Jacksonville Jaguars, St. Louis Rams, and Dallas Cowboys. He was selected by the Jaguars in the seventh round of the 2008 NFL draft. He played college football for the USC Trojans.

== Early life ==
Washington had a heralded career as an athlete at South Torrance High School. In his Senior 2002 season, he earned numerous All-American honors, running for 1,549 yards on 140 carries (11.1 avg.) with 23 TDs while catching 13 passes for 200 yards (15.4 avg.) with 2 TDs in 2002 despite missing 5 games with a knee injury. He also earned substantial notice as a sophomore and junior player.

As a Senior, Washington was ranked as the #12 running back in the nation by ESPN.com was aggressively recruited by USC and Michigan State, as well as Wisconsin, Oregon, Oregon State, ASU, Arizona, Boston College and Washington State.

== College career ==
Although Washington admitted he grew up as a rival-UCLA fan, he became USC's second commitment to the 2003 recruiting class in May 2002. That class also included two other highly touted running backs: 2005 Heisman Trophy-winner Reggie Bush as well as Colorado high school all-star and future USC touchdown leader LenDale White. Going into their freshman 2003 season, all three backs were considered to be talented enough to challenge for the starting position and all three played during the USC opener at Auburn.

Washington's freshman season was limited by a nagging ankle injury suffered in the second game of the season that caused him to miss half the season and the 2004 spring practice due to a stress fracture in the ankle.

He was ruled academically ineligible for the 2004 season and was redshirted. Washington was again academically ineligible for the 2005 season and lost his athletic scholarship. After considering entering the NFL draft, leaving USC or transferring to a different school (with easier academic requirements), Washington was encouraged by his parents, teammates and university staff to stay in school and focus on academics while paying his own way through school.

After much focus and hard work, Washington finally regained academic eligibility in the spring of 2006, and regained his scholarship that August.

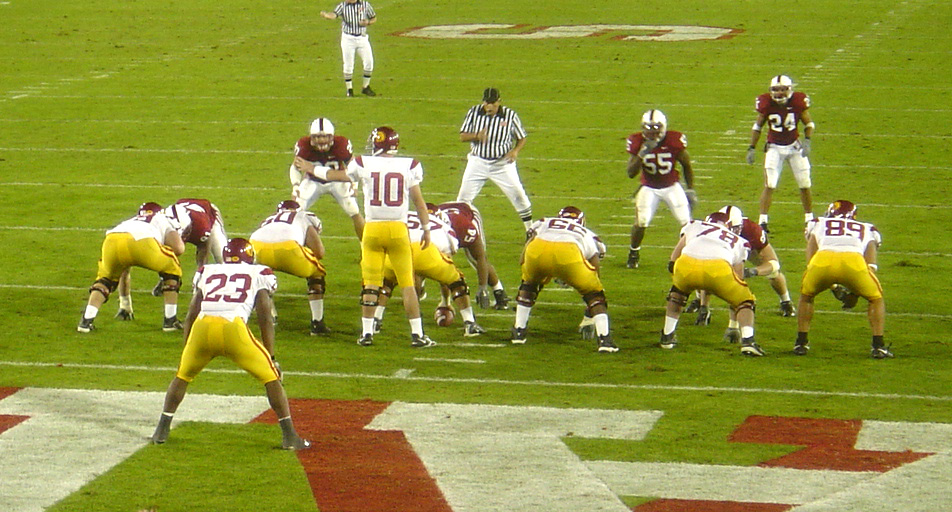
Washington (#23) as the Trojans running back against the Stanford Cardinal.

Initially planned as the starting running back for the 2006 USC Trojans, the redshirt junior suffered a hamstring injury in pre-season practice, but had re-gained the starting position by midseason. He told the Los Angeles Times' Gary Klein that he had decided to forego the 2007 NFL draft and return for his redshirt senior season.

Going into 2007 spring practice, Washington's grades again became a concern. At the start of the 2007 season, Washington was again sidelined with an injury and did not play in the Trojans' opener. However, he rushed for over 900 yards and was a Pac-10 honorable mention player.

== Professional career ==
Pre-draft measurables
Height	Weight	40-yard dash	10-yard split	20-yard split	20-yard shuttle	Three-cone drill	Vertical jump	Broad jump	Bench press	Wonderlic
6 ft 1 3/8 in (1.86 m)	212 lb (96 kg)	4.31 s	1.51 s	2.53 s	4.58 s	7.53 s	41 in (1.04 m)	9 ft 11 in (3.02 m)	23 reps	x
All from USC Pro Day.

=== Jacksonville Jaguars ===
Washington was selected by the Jacksonville Jaguars in the seventh round, overall pick 213, of the 2008 NFL draft. On June 26, 2008 Washington signed a contract of four years worth $1.6 million. He was waived by the Jaguars on September 5, 2009.

=== Dallas Cowboys (first stint) ===
On September 22, 2009, Washington was signed to the Dallas Cowboys' practice squad. On October 3, he was promoted to the active roster because of injuries to Marion Barber III and Felix Jones. Safety Marvin White was waived to make room for Washington on the roster. After playing in the team's loss to the Denver Broncos on October 4, the Cowboys waived Washington the following day and signed cornerback Cletis Gordon. He was re-signed to the practice squad on October 6, only to be promoted a second time to the active roster on October 10. He was waived again on October 12 and signed to the team's practice squad the next day.

=== New York Jets ===
Washington was signed off the Cowboys' practice squad on December 14, 2009 by the New York Jets. Washington would be waived by the team on September 5, 2010. Washington would later be re-signed to the team's practice squad on September 7, 2010.

=== St. Louis Rams ===
Washington was signed off of the New York Jets practice squad on September 28, 2010 by the St. Louis Rams. He was waived on October 18 and signed to the Rams practice squad on October 19. He was released by the Rams on August 4, 2011.

=== Dallas Cowboys (second stint) ===
On November 30, 2011, he was signed to the Cowboys' practice squad. On December 23, he was promoted to the active roster. His only stats came against the Philadelphia Eagles, recording one carry for minus-1 yard and 2 receptions for 13 yards. He wasn't re-signed after the season.
