= John David Booty =

American football player (born 1985)

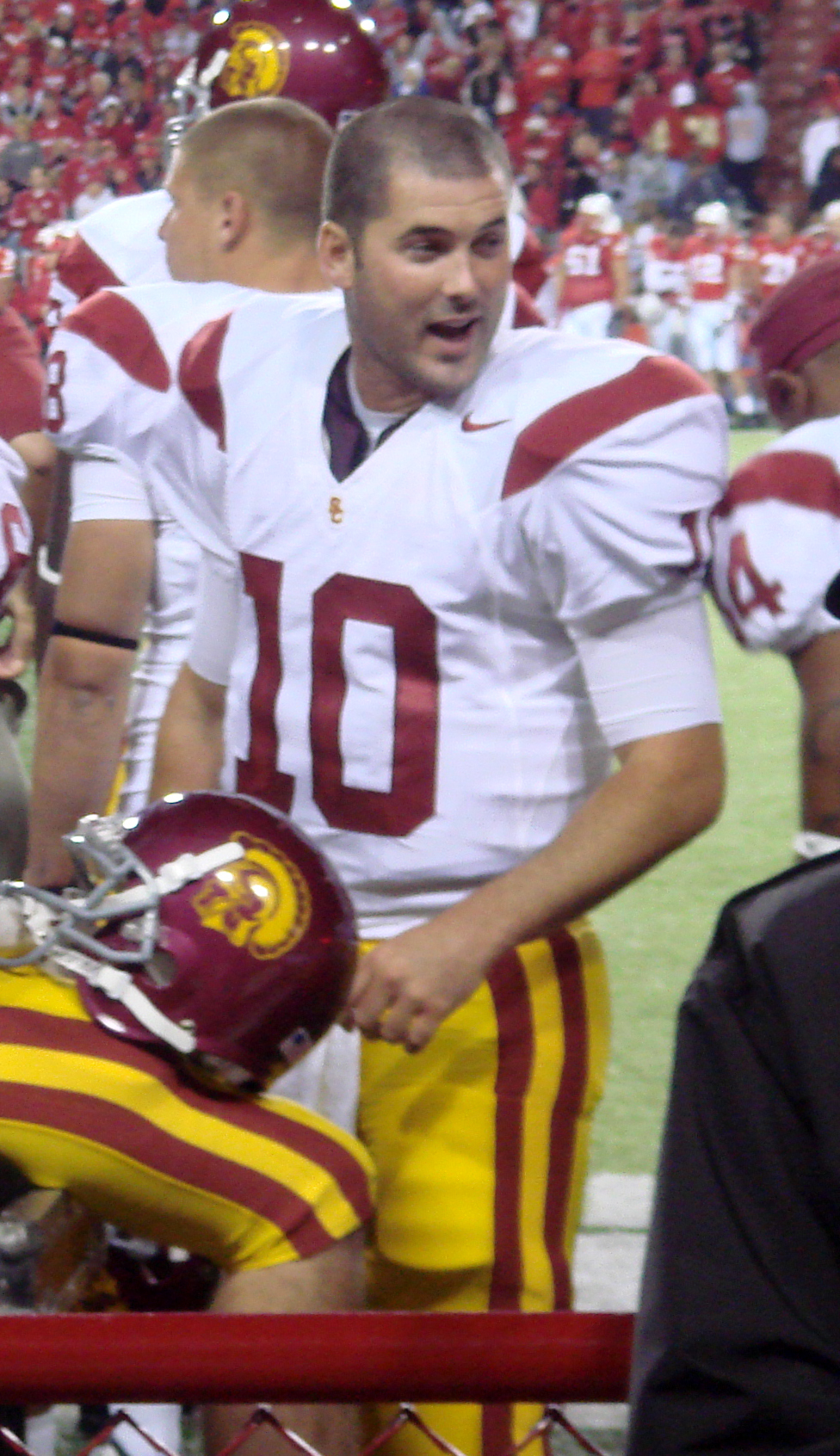
- Booty with the USC Trojans in 2007

No. 4, 9, 10
- Position: Quarterback

Personal information
- Born: January 3, 1985 (age 41); Shreveport, Louisiana, U.S.
- Listed height: 6 ft 2 in (1.88 m)
- Listed weight: 213 lb (97 kg)

Career information
- High school: Evangel Christian Academy (Shreveport)
- College: USC (2003–2007)
- NFL draft: 2008: 5th round, 137th overall pick

Career history
- Minnesota Vikings (2008−2009); Tennessee Titans (2009)*; Houston Texans (2010)*
- * Offseason or practice squad member only

Awards and highlights
- First-team All-Pac-10 (2006)
- Stats at Pro Football Reference

John David Booty (born January 3, 1985) is an American former football quarterback. He played college football for the USC Trojans and was selected by the Minnesota Vikings in the fifth round of the 2008 NFL draft.

Booty was also a member of the Tennessee Titans and Houston Texans. He is the brother of former NFL quarterback and Florida Marlins third baseman Josh Booty.

== Early life ==
Booty prepped at the Evangel Christian Academy in Shreveport, Louisiana, but reclassified and left a year early after his father (who was the team's quarterback coach) left the staff, having already earned enough credits to graduate. Despite leaving after his junior year, Booty's final passing stats were 8,474 yards on 555 of 864 attempts (64.2%) with 88 touchdowns and 26 interceptions. Booty succeeded his brother, former Louisiana State University quarterback Josh Booty, and former Miami quarterback Brock Berlin. In 2001 and 2002 he led Evangel Christian Academy to state-championship game victories held at the Louisiana Superdome in New Orleans.

Booty reclassified to the class of 2003, becoming what is believed to be the first player ever to leave high school a whole year early to play college football. He headlined a class that was considered the best that season, and included other NFL-bound recruits such as Reggie Bush, LenDale White, Steve Smith, and Sam Baker.

== College career ==
=== 2003–2005 ===
Although he entered USC as a highly regarded quarterback prospect, Booty spent his first three years at USC as the back-up to eventual Heisman Trophy winner Matt Leinart, who had replaced former Heisman winner Carson Palmer. When he arrived at USC, the competition for the starting quarterback in the 2003 season had not seen any particular player separating himself from the pack, so when Matt Leinart was eventually chosen as the starter there was some question as to whether he would merely hold the starting position until Booty could learn the offense. Booty earned the spot as the number two quarterback as a freshman, but had to redshirt his second season after suffering an elbow injury in August 2004. When Leinart opted to stay for his final year at USC, there were questions as to whether Booty would transfer to a different school. He opted to remain at USC. Booty had back surgery to repair a bulging disc in his spine at the end of March 2006, but fully recovered and earned the starting spot for the 2006 season.

=== 2006 ===
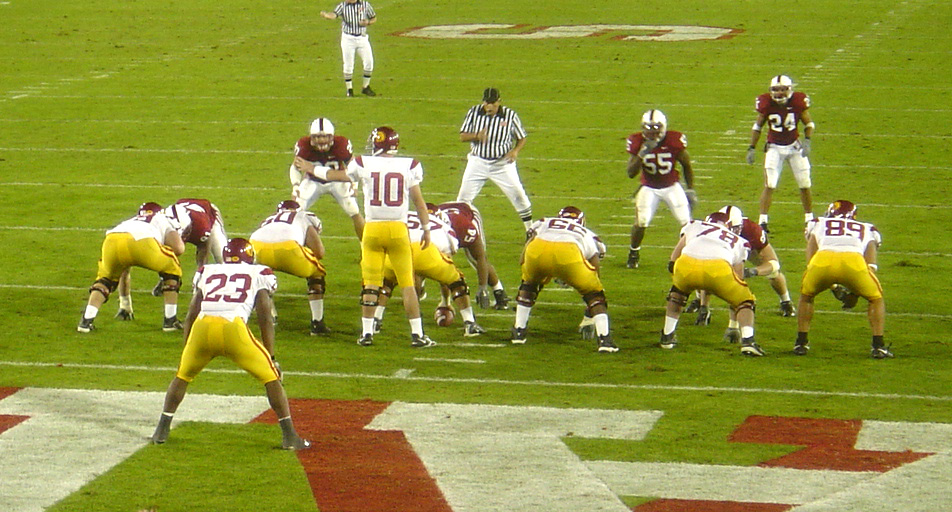
Booty (#10) leading a drive against the Stanford Cardinal

Booty entered the 2006 season as a redshirt junior.

At the beginning of the 2006 season, Booty was one of fifteen players on the official watch list for the Maxwell Award for the best player in college football, although the list states that it "may change without notice based on performance ... during the 2006 season and is not designed to represent an all-inclusive listing of eligible candidates for the collegiate football awards presented by the Maxwell Football Club."

In the 2006 season, Booty was ranked the tenth best quarterback in college football and the number one quarterback in the Pac-10 by Rivals.com.

He started all of the games for the USC Trojans at quarterback in 2006 and was named to the rivals.com and Pacific-10 conference coaches 2006 All-Pac-10 team First-team.

Booty led the Trojans to a victory over Michigan in the 2007 Rose Bowl, throwing for 391 yards and four touchdowns.

=== 2007 ===
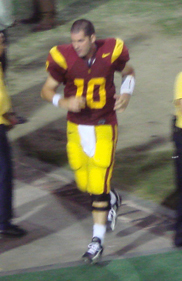
Booty running off the field at the Los Angeles Memorial Coliseum

Booty chose to return for the 2007 season, foregoing the NFL draft. Rivals.com named him one of the top-10 quarterbacks going into the 2007 season, Sports Illustrated as one of the "Top 20 Players Heading into 2007," and he was considered a front-runner for the 2007 Heisman Trophy.

Booty was a 2007 pre-season All-American for Athlon, The Sporting News, and Blue Ribbon and was on the 2007 Maxwell Award and Manning Award watch list. In the summer before the season, he worked out with Indianapolis Colts quarterback Peyton Manning.

On October 6, Booty suffered a broken finger in his throwing hand during a 24–23 loss to Stanford. He sat out the following three games before returning as the starting quarterback against Oregon State on November 3.

On his return, the Trojans finished the season 5–0 and outscored opponents 165–68, culminating in a victory in the 2008 Rose Bowl, a sixth straight Pac-10 title and making the Trojans the first college football team to achieve six straight 11-win seasons. In leading the Trojans to a 49–17 Rose Bowl victory over the Illinois Fighting Illini, Booty set a Rose Bowl record with seven career touchdowns (in the 2007 and 2008 games) and was chosen as the Offensive MVP.

Booty ended his career at USC with a 9–0 record against top-25 teams.

=== College statistics ===
Season	Passing							Rushing			
Season	Cmp	Att	Pct	Yds	TD	Int	Rtg	Att	Yds	Avg	TD
2003	7	14	50.0	90	0	0	104.0	1	-10	-10.0	0
2005	27	42	64.3	327	3	2	143.7	4	-11	-2.8	0
2006	269	436	61.7	3,347	29	9	144.0	33	-53	-1.6	1
2007	215	340	63.2	2,361	23	10	138.0	23	-106	-4.6	1
Totals	518	832	62.3	6,125	55	21	140.9	61	-180	-3.0	2

== Professional career ==
Pre-draft measurables
Height	Weight	Arm length	Hand span	40-yard dash	10-yard split	20-yard split	20-yard shuttle	Vertical jump	Broad jump	Wonderlic
6 ft 2 3/8 in (1.89 m)	218 lb (99 kg)	31 1/2 in (0.80 m)	8 1/2 in (0.22 m)	4.82 s	1.67 s	2.76 s	4.58 s	22.5 in (0.57 m)	8 ft 3 in (2.51 m)	14
All values from NFL Combine

=== Minnesota Vikings ===
Booty at 2008 Minnesota Vikings training camp

Booty broke from convention and stated on a national television broadcast, more than a week before the NFL draft, that he hoped to be selected by the Minnesota Vikings. He was drafted by the Vikings in the fifth round (137th overall) of the 2008 NFL draft. Booty made the team after a pre-season battle for the third spot on the depth chart with Brooks Bollinger. He did not take a snap in 2008, but after starter Gus Frerotte went down with a lower back injury, Booty was listed as the second-string quarterback during the week 15 meeting with the Arizona Cardinals and Tarvaris Jackson made the start.

With the signing of Brett Favre in the 2009 off season, Booty switched his jersey from #4 to #9. After an unimpressive performance in the pre-season, Booty was waived by the Vikings on September 5, 2009; he was subsequently signed to the team's practice squad. He was released from the practice squad on October 14, 2009, only to be re-signed to it on October 17. He was subsequently released from the Vikings again on October 21, 2009.

=== Tennessee Titans ===
Booty was signed to Tennessee Titans practice squad on October 28, 2009.

=== Houston Texans ===
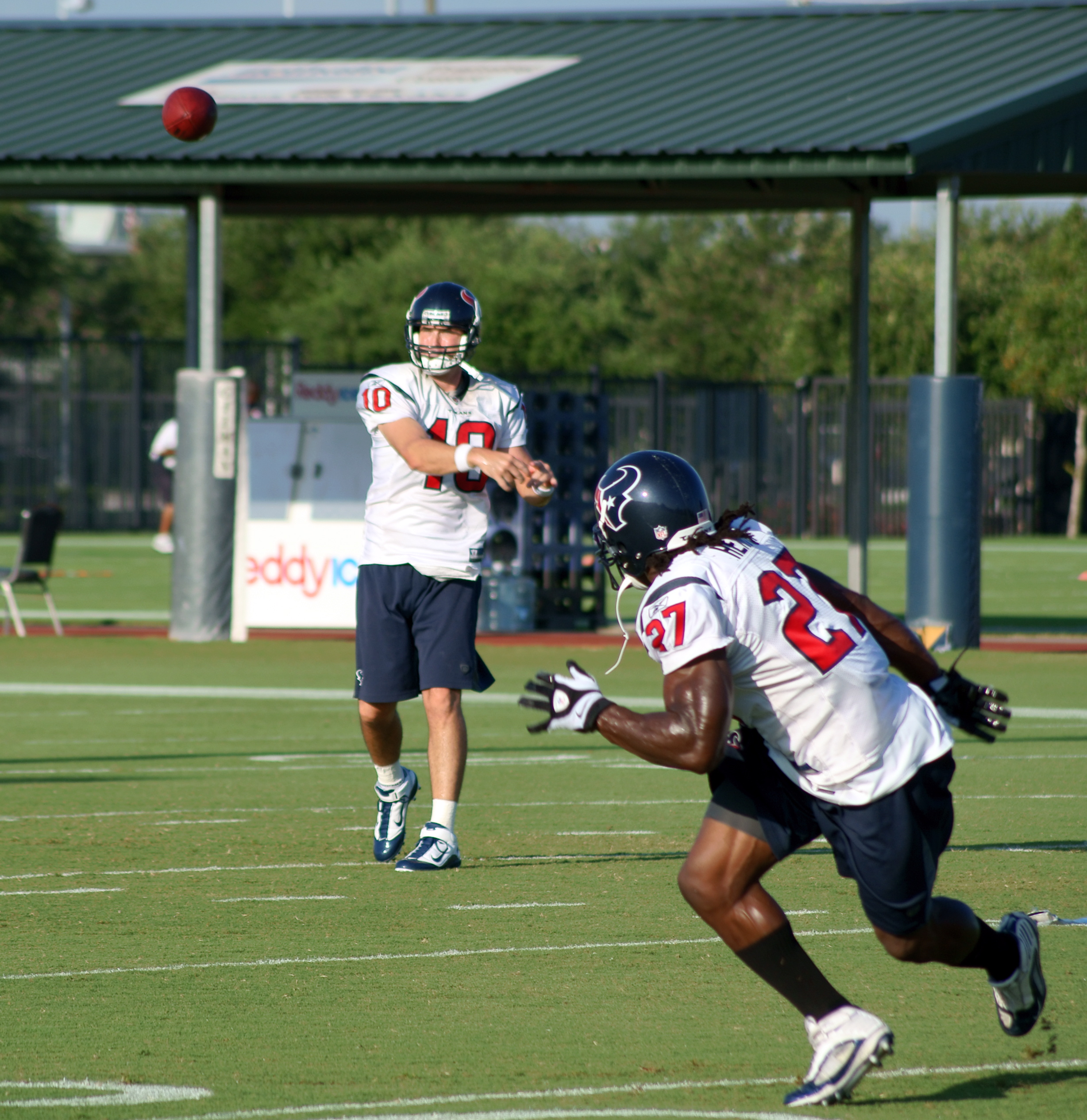
Booty with the Texans in 2010

After his contract with the Titans expired at the end of the 2009 season, Booty signed a future contract with the Houston Texans. Booty was waived as part of final cuts before the 2010 NFL season.

== Personal life ==
Booty is the younger brother of former Cleveland Browns and Oakland Raiders quarterback Josh Booty (who threw for 3,951 yards and 24 touchdowns during two years with LSU's football team) and former LSU and Valdosta State University wide receiver Abram Booty (who caught 117 passes for 1,768 yards during three years at LSU). His nephew, General, plays quarterback for the Louisiana-Monroe Warhawks. Josh also played baseball for the Florida Marlins. He is from the same hometown as Terry Bradshaw, Tommy Maddox and Art Carmody. Booty was high school backfield mates with former LSU and former San Diego Chargers running back Jacob Hester. Booty was roommates with then-USC center Ryan Kalil during the 2006 season. He is sometimes called "J.D.". Booty married his fiancée Jill in July 2009.
