= Matt Spanos =

American football player (born 1984)

No. 69, 60
- Position: Guard / Center

Personal information
- Born: December 31, 1984 (age 41); Chicago, Illinois, U.S.
- Listed height: 6 ft 5 in (1.96 m)
- Listed weight: 305 lb (138 kg)

Career information
- High school: Corona (Corona, California)
- College: USC
- NFL draft: 2008: undrafted

Career history
- Miami Dolphins (2008)*; Dallas Cowboys (2009)*; San Francisco 49ers (2009)*; Hamilton Tiger-Cats (2009); Arizona Rattlers (2010)*; Omaha Nighthawks (2010); Sacramento Mountain Lions (2010–2012); San Jose SaberCats (2013); Orlando Predators (2013); Los Angeles Kiss (2014)*
- * Offseason or practice squad member only
- Stats at ArenaFan.com

Matt Spanos (born December 31, 1984) is an American former professional football player who was a guard in the United Football League (UFL). He played college football for the USC Trojans.

== Early life ==
Spanos graduated from Corona High School where he played on the defensive line as well.

== College career ==
Spanos played all thirteen games as a redshirt sophomore. He would have started in 2006 as an offensive tackle but was academically ineligible.

Spanos started nearly every game (he only missed the first three due to an injury) at center He was selected for the Pacific-10 Conference honorable mention team.

== Professional career ==
=== Pre-draft ===
He was invited to the 2008 NFL Combine.

=== Miami Dolphins ===
He signed a free agent contract with the National Football League's Miami Dolphins on May 19, 2008. However, he was waived by the Dolphins during final cuts on August 30 and spent the season out of football.

=== Dallas Cowboys ===
Spanos was signed to a future contract by the Dallas Cowboys on January 12, 2009. He was waived on July 2, 2009.

=== San Francisco 49ers ===
Spanos was signed by the San Francisco 49ers on July 31, 2009. He was later released by the team on September 5, 2009

=== Hamilton Tiger-Cats ===
On October 20, 2009, Spanos was signed by the Hamilton Tiger-Cats of the Canadian Football League, and added to their practice roster. He was released on June 24, 2010.
