= Steve Smith (wide receiver, born 1985) =

American football player

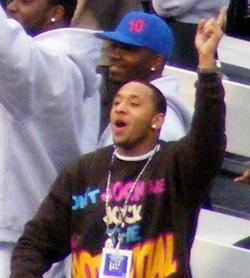
- Smith (back) at the Giants' Super Bowl XLII victory rally

No. 12, 11
- Position: Wide receiver

Personal information
- Born: May 6, 1985 (age 41); Anchorage, Alaska, U.S.
- Listed height: 6 ft 0 in (1.83 m)
- Listed weight: 195 lb (88 kg)

Career information
- High school: William Howard Taft (Woodland Hills, California)
- College: USC (2003–2006)
- NFL draft: 2007: 2nd round, 51st overall pick

Career history
- New York Giants (2007–2010); Philadelphia Eagles (2011); St. Louis Rams (2012); Tampa Bay Buccaneers (2013)*
- * Offseason or practice squad member only

Awards and highlights
- Super Bowl champion (XLII); Pro Bowl (2009); First-team All-American (2006); First-team All-Pac-10 (2006)

Career NFL statistics
- Receptions: 245
- Receiving yards: 2,641
- Receiving touchdowns: 12
- Stats at Pro Football Reference

Steven Smith (born May 6, 1985) is an American former professional football player who was a wide receiver in the National Football League (NFL). He played college football for the University of Southern California (USC), and earned All-American honors. He was selected by the New York Giants in the second round of the 2007 NFL draft, and was also a member of the Philadelphia Eagles, St. Louis Rams, and Tampa Bay Buccaneers.

== Early life ==
Smith was born in Anchorage, Alaska. He played at Taft High School in the San Fernando Valley, where he set the state records for most receptions (271) and yardage (4486) in a varsity career, and led the Toreadors to two consecutive Los Angeles City Section Championship games (although they lost both games). His career yardage record was surpassed by Canyon High School Wide Receiver, Drew Wolitarsky on October 5, 2012. He played in the 2003 U.S. Army All-American Bowl with several of his USC Trojan teammates including Reggie Bush, LenDale White, and Sam Baker. He also played high school basketball and was a teammate with former Los Angeles Lakers point guard Jordan Farmar.

== College career ==
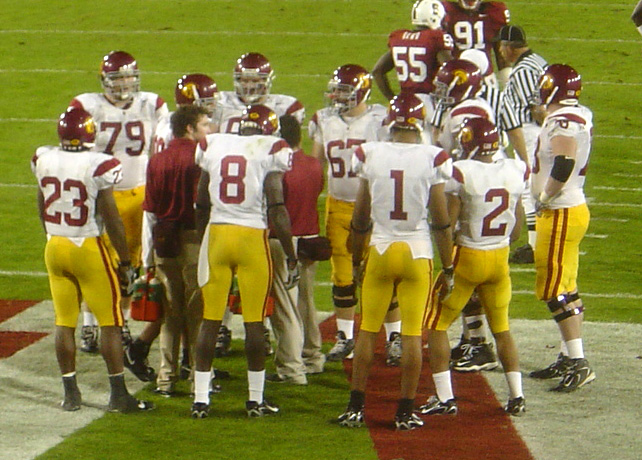
Smith (#2) in the huddle during a 2006 game.

Smith attended the University of Southern California, where he was one of the top two wide receivers by yardage for the USC Trojans football team. He was on the Maxwell Award 2006 watch list for the best player in college football and was named to the 2006 All-Pac-10 team First Team and to the 2006 All-Pac-10 Second Team by rivals.com. Smith was named honorable mention on the SI.com All-American team and First-team All-American by CBS Sportsline. Smith was voted team MVP in 2006 by teammates of his 4th ranked Trojans team. Smith caught three touchdown passes from Heisman Trophy winner Matt Leinart in USC's 55-19 national championship/Orange Bowl victory over Oklahoma.

== Professional career ==
Pre-draft measurables
Height	Weight	Arm length	Hand span	40-yard dash	10-yard split	20-yard split	20-yard shuttle	Three-cone drill	Vertical jump	Broad jump
5 ft 11 3/4 in (1.82 m)	197 lb (89 kg)	32 1/4 in (0.82 m)	9 3/8 in (0.24 m)	4.45 s	1.54 s	2.58 s	4.19 s	6.68 s	38 in (0.97 m)	10 ft 0 in (3.05 m)
All values from NFL Combine

=== New York Giants ===
Smith was selected in the second round (51st overall) by the New York Giants in the 2007 NFL draft. He wore number 12. Smith only played in five games in the 2007 regular season (Weeks 1, 2, 15, 16, 17), recording eight catches for 63 yards and no touchdowns. However, after returning from a shoulder and hamstring injury, Smith turned in an outstanding postseason as he became a reliable third down receiver for quarterback Eli Manning. He made two big catches at the end of the first half in Dallas, which set up a game-tying touchdown and caught five passes in Super Bowl XLII, including four on third down, one of which was a 12-yard reception on a third and 11 with 45 seconds remaining in the fourth quarter. Smith and the Giants prevailed over the New England Patriots 17-14. In the 2008 regular season, Smith became one of Manning's favorite targets, and not just on 3rd down as Smith led the Giants in receptions over Amani Toomer and Plaxico Burress, who both started over Smith. Smith helped the Giants win the NFC East division.

In the 2009 season, with the Giants' loss of Burress and Toomer, Smith and Domenik Hixon were named the starting wideouts. Smith opened the season explosively, and by the end of week 4, Smith led the NFL in receptions (34), receiving yards (411), and touchdown receptions (4).

In Week 15, in a game against the Redskins, Smith broke the Giants franchise record for most receptions in a single season, also becoming the first Giants receiver in history to make 90 catches in one season.

Smith was selected as an alternate in the 2010 Pro Bowl. He later replaced Arizona Cardinals wide receiver Larry Fitzgerald on the 2010 Pro Bowl roster after Fitzgerald withdrew due to an injury.

=== Philadelphia Eagles ===
On August 10, 2011, Smith agreed to a one-year, $2 million deal with the Philadelphia Eagles. He was placed on the active/physically unable to perform list on August 13. He was activated from the list on August 27.

He had eleven catches for 124 yards and a touchdown before he was placed on injured reserve on December 12 due to a bone bruise in his knee. He played in nine games for the Eagles, with one start against the Arizona Cardinals on November 13, in which he made five catches for 47 yards.

=== St. Louis Rams ===
The St. Louis Rams signed Smith on March 26, 2012.

=== Tampa Bay Buccaneers ===
On April 2, 2013, Smith signed with the Tampa Bay Buccaneers. Smith announced his retirement on May 29, 2013. Five years later, in his first year of eligibility, Smith was mistakenly announced as a modern-era nominee to the Pro Football Hall of Fame.

== Career statistics ==
=== NFL ===
Legend
**Bold**	Career high

Year	Team	Games		Receiving				
Year	Team	GP	GS	Rec	Yds	Avg	Lng	TD
2007	NYG	5	0	8	63	7.9	12	0
2008	NYG	16	4	57	574	10.1	30	1
2009	NYG	16	15	**107**	**1,220**	**11.4**	**51**	**7**
2010	NYG	9	7	48	529	11.0	45	3
2011	PHI	9	1	11	124	11.3	20	1
2012	STL	9	2	14	131	9.4	25	0
Total		64	29	245	2,641	10.8	51	12

=== College ===
Season	Team	GP	Receiving			
Season	Team	GP	Rec	Yds	Avg	TD
2003	USC	12	17	319	18.8	2
2004	USC	8	42	660	15.7	6
2005	USC	13	60	957	16.0	5
2006	USC	13	71	1,083	15.3	9
Total		46	190	3,019	15.9	22

== Personal life ==
Smith's brother, Malcolm Smith, was the MVP of Super Bowl XLVIII with the Seattle Seahawks. According to his biography page from the New York Giants, Steve was a Public Policy/Management and Planning major at USC. He was born in Anchorage, Alaska, raised in Woodland Hills, California and Canoga Park, California, and currently resides in the San Fernando Valley.
