= Oscar Lua =

American football player (born 1984)

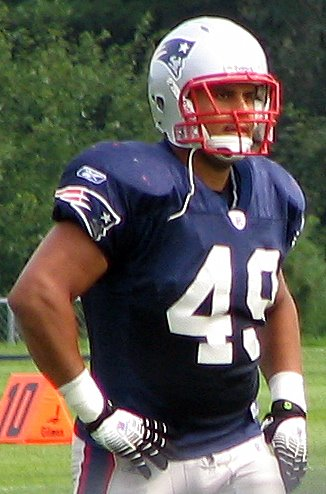
- Lua with the New England Patriots in 2007

No. 49
- Position: Linebacker

Personal information
- Born: May 9, 1984 (age 42); Indio, California, U.S.
- Listed height: 6 ft 2 in (1.88 m)
- Listed weight: 280 lb (127 kg)

Career information
- High school: Indio
- College: USC
- NFL draft: 2007: 7th round, 211th overall pick

Career history
- New England Patriots (2007)

Oscar Lua (born May 9, 1984) is an American former professional football player who was a linebacker in the National Football League (NFL). He was selected by the New England Patriots in the seventh round of the 2007 NFL draft. He played college football for the USC Trojans.

== Early life ==
The son of Mexican immigrants, Lua attended Indio High School in Indio, California. During his senior year, he earned various awards and honors, including: 2001 Prep Star All-American; Max Emfinger All-American; Super Prep All-Farwest Defensive MVP; Prep Star All-Western Region; Tom Lemming All-West; Tacoma News Tribune Western 100; Cal-Hi Sports All-State Medium Schools first team; All-CIF Division VIII first team; Los Angeles Times All-Southern California first team; Los Angeles Times All-Desert/Mountain first team; Riverside Press-Enterprise All-Riverside County first team; and All-Desert Valley League Defensive MVP.

Despite missing three games with an injury in 2001, Lua made 148 tackles (108 solo) with three sacks while averaging 13 stops a game, plus had three interceptions (one returned for a TD), four fumble recoveries, six forced fumbles and scored twice on blocked punts. He also was an outfielder on Indio's baseball team, hitting .485 with 11 home runs in 2001 to earn All-League honors for the second consecutive season. He then went on to hit .456 with 13 home runs and 38 RBIs in 2002.

== College career ==
Lua played college football at the University of Southern California. He hoped to push for the starting middle linebacker job as a sophomore in 2003, but missed spring practice while recuperating from a knee injury suffered late in 2002. He eventually re-injured the knee, causing him to miss most of the 2003 season. However, he was able to redshirt because of the early-season injury.

In 2004, Lua was a backup linebacker and key special teams player. Overall, he appeared in all 13 games, making 13 tackles, including one for loss. He collected two stops against both Virginia Tech and Oregon State.

In 2005, Lua emerged from fall camp as the starting middle linebacker and did a commendable job. He appeared in 12 games (starting 11) and had a team-high 66 tackles to go along with one-half sack, one fumble recovery, two forced fumbles, one interception and two pass defenses. He was named 2005 All-Pac-10 honorable mention. On the season, Lua registered: three tackles at Hawaii; a team-best eight stops against Arkansas; another eight at Oregon; three tackles and an interception at Arizona State; a team-best 10 tackles against Arizona; 10 tackles and a pass defended at Notre Dame; seven stops at Washington; three tackles and a fumble recovery against Washington State; six tackles and a forced fumble against Fresno State; two tackles and a pass defended against UCLA; and six tackles and forced a fumble against Texas.

In his senior year in 2006, Lua was injured during the season-opener against Arkansas. The injury caused him to lose his starting job, which he was never able to re-acquire. After returning from injury, Lua finished the year with 36 tackles.

== Professional career ==
Lua was selected by the New England Patriots in the seventh round (211th overall pick) of the 2007 NFL draft. He was placed on the team's injured reserve list before the season. On February 26, 2008, he was waived by the Patriots.

== Post NFL career ==
Lua is now director of the Trojan Club of the Desert. He is also General Partner at Statewide Services, Inc & involved in general contractor and construction services
