= Daniel Reynolds =

Daniel Reynolds or Dan Reynolds may refer to:

- Dan Reynolds (born 1987), American singer and songwriter, member of Imagine Dragons
- Dan Reynolds (cartoonist) (born 1960), American cartoonist
- Daniel H. Reynolds (1832–1902), Confederate States Army brigadier general, lawyer, and politician in Arkansas
- Daniel J. Reynolds (1944–2019), American judge
- Danny Reynolds (baseball) (1919–2007), American baseball player
- Danny Reynolds (footballer) (born 1997), English footballer
- Daniel Reynolds, designer of Malabar (typeface)
