= Tim Johnson (linebacker) =

American gridiron football player (born 1978)

No. 51, 50
- Position: Linebacker

Personal information
- Born: February 7, 1978 (age 48); Fairfield, Alabama, U.S.
- Listed height: 6 ft 0 in (1.83 m)
- Listed weight: 245 lb (111 kg)

Career information
- High school: Fairfield (AL)
- College: Youngstown State
- NFL draft: 2001: undrafted

Career history
- Baltimore Ravens (2001)*; Chicago Bears (2001–2002)*; → Rhein Fire (2002); Oakland Raiders (2002–2005); Baltimore Ravens (2006); Calgary Stampeders (2009)
- * Offseason or practice squad member only

Awards and highlights
- I-AA Defensive P.O.Y. finalist (2000); All-NFL Europe (2002)

Career NFL statistics
- Tackles: 111
- Sacks: 0.5
- Passes defended: 7
- Stats at Pro Football Reference

Tim Maurice Johnson (born February 7, 1978) is a former NFL Linebacker. He was signed by the Baltimore Ravens as an undrafted free agent in 2001. He played college football at Youngstown State. Johnson was also a member of the Chicago Bears, Oakland Raiders and Calgary Stampeders.

== Professional career ==
A native of Fairfield, Alabama, Tim Johnson graduated from Fairfield High School in 1996 where he excelled in football, baseball, and basketball. After graduating, he attended the University of West Alabama, East Mississippi Junior College, and later transferring to Youngstown State University in Ohio where he played for two seasons emerging as a star linebacker. Tim was a finalist for the NCAA Division 1-AA Defensive Player of the Year award in 2000 and was inducted into the YSU Athletics Hall of Fame in 2010. His professional football career launched when he was signed as an un-drafted free agent by the Baltimore Ravens in 2001, where he starred on HBO's Hard Knocks.

During his six-year NFL career, Tim played for the Baltimore Ravens, Chicago Bears, NFL-Europe Rhein Fire (World Bowl X), and Oakland Raiders. In 2002, Johnson assisted the Raiders in advancing to Super Bowl XXXVII, where he blocked a Tampa Bay punt that Oakland returned for a touchdown. Tim ended his professional football career in 2009 with the Canadian Football League's Calgary Stampeders.

Tim Johnson is most known for his impression of teammate Shannon Sharpe on HBO's first season of Hard Knocks in 2001, his Blocked Punt for the Oakland Raiders against Tampa Bay Buccaneers in Super Bowl XXXVII which was returned for a touchdown and was awarded Special Teams Player Of The Year by teammate Jerry Rice.

Johnson is CEO of Head Impact Prevention Football League (HIP) which includes the use of modified helmets and shoulder pads in an attempt to address the concussion issues.

== NFL career statistics ==
Legend
**Bold**	Career high

=== Regular season ===
Year	Team	Games		Tackles					Interceptions					Fumbles			
Year	Team	GP	GS	Cmb	Solo	Ast	Sck	TFL	Int	Yds	TD	Lng	PD	FF	FR	Yds	TD
2002	OAK	6	0	6	4	2	0.0	0	0	0	0	0	0	0	0	0	0
2003	OAK	12	**4**	**42**	**34**	8	0.0	1	0	0	0	0	2	0	0	0	0
2004	OAK	**16**	0	39	26	**13**	**0.5**	**2**	**1**	**8**	0	**8**	**4**	0	0	0	0
2005	OAK	**16**	0	20	15	5	0.0	**2**	0	0	0	0	1	0	0	0	0
2006	BAL	4	0	4	4	0	0.0	0	0	0	0	0	0	0	0	0	0
		54	4	111	83	28	0.5	5	1	8	0	8	7	0	0	0	0

=== Playoffs ===
Year	Team	Games		Tackles					Interceptions					Fumbles			
Year	Team	GP	GS	Cmb	Solo	Ast	Sck	TFL	Int	Yds	TD	Lng	PD	FF	FR	Yds	TD
2002	OAK	**3**	0	**10**	**8**	**2**	0.0	**2**	0	0	0	0	0	**2**	0	0	0
2006	BAL	1	0	1	1	0	0.0	0	0	0	0	0	0	0	0	0	0
		4	0	11	9	2	0.0	2	0	0	0	0	0	2	0	0	0

== Coaching career ==
Johnson later returned to his alma mater Youngstown State where he was hired as Director of Player Personnel. At a February 27, 2021 game against the Northern Iowa Panthers, Johnson lowered his shoulder and hit a UNI player that was running out of bounds. Johnson was banned from the sidelines for the remainder of the season action.
