= 2006 Baltimore Ravens season =

NFL team season

- Owner: Steve Bisciotti
- General manager: Ozzie Newsome
- Head coach: Brian Billick
- Offensive coordinator: Jim Fassel (fired Oct 17)
- Defensive coordinator: Rex Ryan
- Home stadium: M&T Bank Stadium

Results
- Record: 13–3
- Division place: 1st AFC North
- Playoffs: Lost Divisional Playoffs (vs. Colts) 6–15
- Pro Bowlers: T Jonathan Ogden; OLB Adalius Thomas; OLB Terrell Suggs; MLB Ray Lewis; MLB Bart Scott; CB Chris McAlister; FS Ed Reed

Uniform
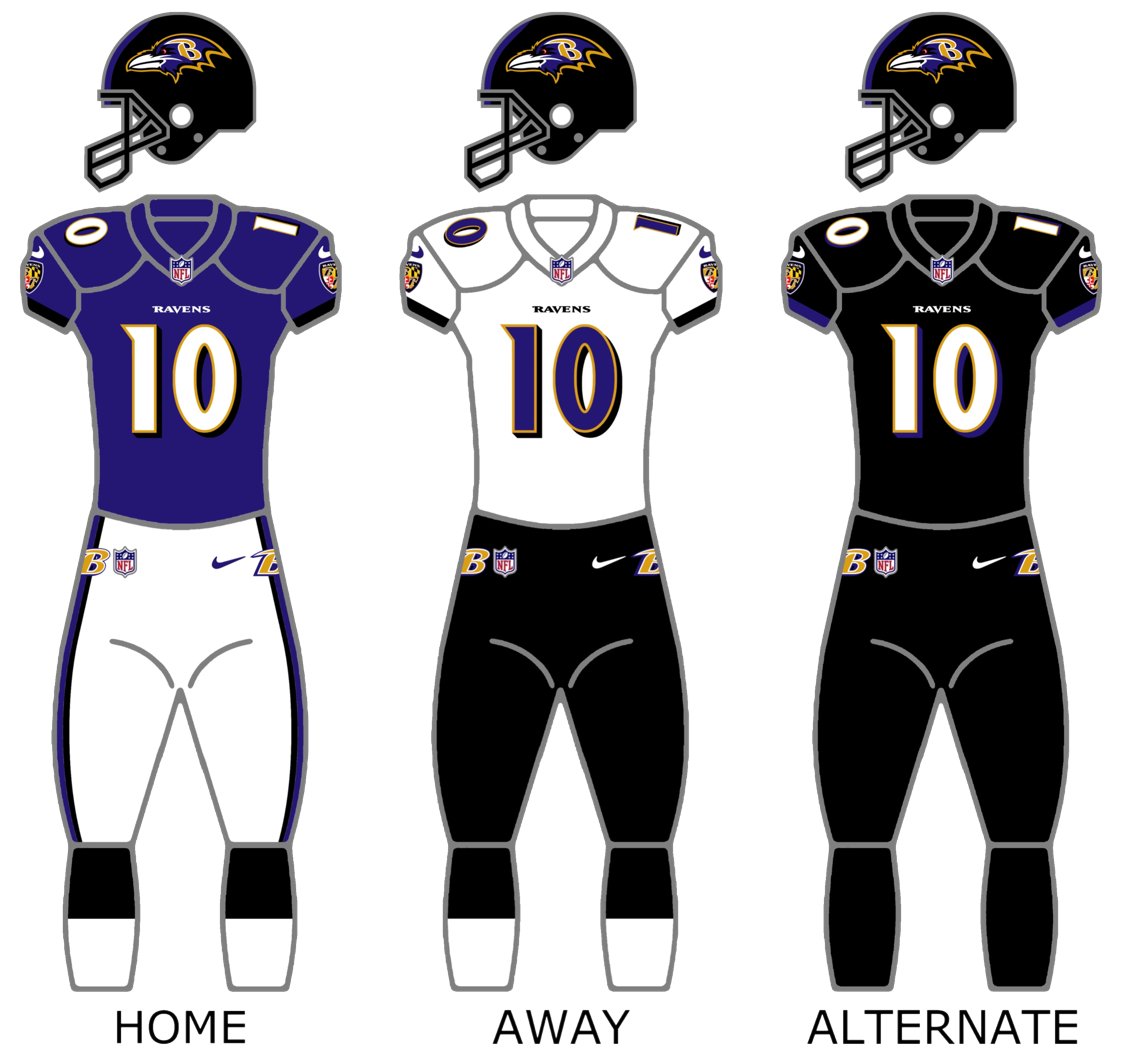

The 2006 season was the Baltimore Ravens' 11th in the National Football League (NFL), their 8th under head coach Brian Billick, and their 5th season under general manager Ozzie Newsome.

The team improved on their 6–10 record from 2005 to a 13–3 record and marks their greatest-single season turnaround for the team. The Ravens, for the first time in franchise history, started 4–0. The Ravens ended the regular season with a then-franchise record thirteen wins (that stood until a fourteen-win season in 2019). The Ravens clinched the AFC North title and a 1st-round playoff bye, their first playoff berth since 2003. However, their season came to an end, with a 15–6 upset loss to the eventual Super Bowl XLI champions Indianapolis Colts in the divisional round.

== Offseason ==
In the 2006 offseason, the Baltimore Ravens were in negotiations to try to obtain veteran quarterback Steve McNair from the Tennessee Titans. On Sunday, April 30, 2006, the Titans allowed McNair to speak with the Ravens and on May 1, 2006, the Baltimore Sun stated that the Baltimore Ravens had been waiting for McNair to be released by the Titans since it was the free agency period. The deal was completed in June 2006.

McNair and the Ravens agreed to an $11 million signing bonus on May 5, 2006.

On June 7, 2006, the Ravens and Titans agreed to trade a 4th round pick in the 2007 draft for McNair, pending a physical.

Steve McNair brought a calm leadership presence to the quarterback role that had been absent from the franchise since its inception. The critical issue in the 2006 season remained whether McNair would hearken back to his Pro Bowl performance days or whether the cumulative effect of injuries would continue to hamper his performance.

During the 2006 NFL draft the Ravens acquired future star defensive tackle Haloti Ngata as well as safety Dawan Landry and punter Sam Koch.

During free agency, the Ravens also picked up former Denver Broncos RB Mike Anderson, who in 2005 posted a 1,000-yard plus season. He was expected to back up Jamal Lewis and to be insurance if Lewis posted stats similar to 2005. The Ravens also acquired DE Trevor Pryce of the Denver Broncos who would prove a strong addition the Ravens defensive line, which had some pressuring problems the previous season.

The Ravens also changed flagship radio stations, from WQSR "Jack FM" to WBAL 1090AM and WIYY "98 Rock." The announcing team was not retained; Scott Garceau now co-hosts an "uncensored" pro football discussion program, with former Baltimore Colt Tom Matte, simulcast on WHFS "Free FM" and WJZ, ESPN Radio 1300AM.

=== Draft ===
2006 Baltimore Ravens draft
Round	Pick	Player	Position	College	Notes
1	12	Haloti Ngata *	DT	Oregon	
2	56	Chris Chester	G	Oklahoma	
3	87	David Pittman	CB	Northwestern State	
4	111	Demetrius Williams	WR	Oregon	
4	132	P. J. Daniels	RB	Georgia Tech	
5	146	Dawan Landry	S	Georgia Tech	
5	166	Quinn Sypniewski	TE	Colorado	
6	203	Sam Koch *	P	Nebraska	
6	208	Derrick Martin.	CB	Wyoming	
7	219	Ryan LaCasse	DE	Syracuse	
Made roster † Pro Football Hall of Fame * Made at least one Pro Bowl during career

== Personnel ==
=== Staff / Coaches ===
Baltimore Ravens 2006 staff
Front office: Owner – Steve Bisciotti; Minority owner – Art Modell; President – Dick Cass; General manager/Executive Vice President – Ozzie Newsome; Vice president of football administration – Pat Moriarty; Director of pro personnel – George Kokinis; Assistant director of pro personnel – Vince Newsome; Director of player development - O. J. Brigance; Director of college scouting – Eric DeCosta; Head coaches: Head coach – Brian Billick; Assistant Head coach/Offensive line – Chris Foerster; Special assistant to the Head coach/Defensive assistant - Vic Fangio; Offensive coaches: Offensive coordinator - Jim Fassel; Quarterbacks – Rick Neuheisel; Running backs – Tony Nathan; Wide receivers – Mike Johnson; Assistant Wide receivers/quarterbacks - Jedd Fisch; Tight ends/Assistant offensive line – Wade Harman; Assistant offensive line – Greg Roman	Defensive coaches: Assistant head coach/defensive coordinator – Rex Ryan; Defensive line – Clarence Brooks; Linebackers – Jeff FitzGerald; Outside linebackers – Mike Pettine; Defensive backs – Mark Carrier; Secondary – Dennis Thurman; Special teams coaches: Special teams coordinator – Frank Gansz, Jr.; Assistant special teams – John Fassel; Strength and conditioning: Strength and conditioning – Jeff Friday; Assistant strength and conditioning – Paul Ricci

=== Final roster ===
2006 Baltimore Ravens roster
Quarterbacks (QB): 7 Kyle Boller; 9 Steve McNair; Running backs (RB): 38 Mike Anderson; 30 P. J. Daniels; 31 Jamal Lewis; 39 Nick Luchey FB; 34 Ovie Mughelli FB; 40 Cory Ross; Wide receivers (WR): 80 Alex Bannister; 89 Mark Clayton; 81 Devard Darling; 85 Derrick Mason; 84 Clarence Moore; 87 Demetrius Williams; Tight ends (TE): 86 Todd Heap; 88 Quinn Sypniewski; 83 Daniel Wilcox	Offensive linemen (OL): 60 Jason Brown G; 65 Chris Chester G; 62 Mike Flynn C; 74 Mike Kracalik T; 63 Ikechuku Ndukwe G/T; 75 Jonathan Ogden T; 79 Tony Pashos T; 78 Adam Terry T; 68 Keydrick Vincent G; Defensive linemen (DL): 93 Dwan Edwards DE/DT; 91 Aubrayo Franklin DT; 97 Kelly Gregg DT; 92 Haloti Ngata DT; 90 Trevor Pryce DE; 56 Gary Stills DE; 55 Terrell Suggs DE	Linebackers (LB): 58 Dennis Haley MLB; 95 Jarret Johnson OLB; 50 Tim Johnson OLB; 52 Ray Lewis MLB; 57 Bart Scott OLB; 96 Adalius Thomas OLB; Defensive backs (DB): 35 Corey Ivy CB; 26 Dawan Landry SS; 29 Derrick Martin CB/S; 21 Chris McAlister CB; 25 Evan Oglesby CB; 24 David Pittman CB; 27 Ronnie Prude CB; 20 Ed Reed FS; 22 Samari Rolle CB; 42 Gerome Sapp SS; 23 Jamaine Winborne CB; Special teams (ST): 70 Matt Katula LS; 4 Sam Koch P; 3 Matt Stover K	Practice squad: 43 Rob Abiamiri TE; 66 Remi Ayodele DT; 14 Romby Bryant WR; 48 Jim Cottrell LB; 73 Samuel Gutekunst T ^{Int'l}; 44 Bobby Iwuchukwu LB; 10 Drew Olson QB; 66 Chris Pino T; Reserve: 94 Justin Bannan DT (IR); 53 Dan Cody LB (IR); 99 Atiyyah Ellison DT (IR); 33 Justin Green FB (IR); 64 Edwin Mulitalo G (IR); 69 Brian Rimpf G (IR); 36 B. J. Sams (IR); 51 Mike Smith LB (IR); 32 Musa Smith RB (IR); Rookies in italics 53 active, 9 reserve, 8 practice squad

== Schedule ==
=== Preseason ===
Week	Date	Opponent	Result	Record
1	August 11	New York Giants	**L** 16–17	0–1
2	August 17	Philadelphia Eagles	**W** 20–10	1–1
3	August 25	at Minnesota Vikings	**L** 7–30	1–2
4	August 31	at Washington Redskins	**W** 17–10	2–2

=== Regular season ===
Apart from their AFC North division games, the Ravens played against the AFC West and NFC South according to the conference rotation, and played the Titans and Bills based on 2005 divisional positions.

Week	Date	Opponent	Result	Record	Attendance
1	September 10	at Tampa Bay Buccaneers	**W** 27–0	1–0	65,087
2	September 17	Oakland Raiders	**W** 28–6	2–0	70,744
3	September 24	at **Cleveland Browns**	**W** 15–14	3–0	72,474
4	October 1	San Diego Chargers	**W** 16–13	4–0	70,743
5	October 9	at Denver Broncos	**L** 3–13	4–1	76,355
6	October 15	Carolina Panthers	**L** 21–23	4–2	70,762
7	Bye				
8	October 29	at New Orleans Saints	**W** 35–22	5–2	69,152
9	November 5	**Cincinnati Bengals**	**W** 26–20	6–2	70,792
10	November 12	at Tennessee Titans	**W** 27–26	7–2	69,143
11	November 19	Atlanta Falcons	**W** 24–10	8–2	70,790
12	November 26	**Pittsburgh Steelers**	**W** 27–0	9–2	70,946
13	November 30	at **Cincinnati Bengals**	**L** 7–13	9–3	65,973
14	December 10	at Kansas City Chiefs	**W** 20–10	10–3	77,232
15	December 17	**Cleveland Browns**	**W** 27–17	11–3	70,857
16	December 24	at **Pittsburgh Steelers**	**W** 31–7	12–3	63,224
17	December 31	Buffalo Bills	**W** 19–7	13–3	70,913
Note: Intra-division opponents are in **bold** text.

=== Postseason ===
Week	Date	Opponent	Result	Attendance
Wild Card	First-round bye			
Divisional	January 13	Indianapolis Colts	**L** 6–15	71,162

== Division standings ==
AFC North
	W	L	T	PCT	DIV	CONF	PF	PA	STK
^{(2)} Baltimore Ravens	13	3	0	.813	5–1	10–2	353	201	W4
Cincinnati Bengals	8	8	0	.500	4–2	6–6	373	331	L3
Pittsburgh Steelers	8	8	0	.500	3–3	5–7	353	315	W1
Cleveland Browns	4	12	0	.250	0–6	3–9	238	356	L4

== Game summaries ==
=== Regular season ===
==== Week 1: at Tampa Bay Buccaneers ====
	1	2	3	4	Total
Ravens	7	10	3	7	27
Buccaneers	0	0	0	0	0

at Raymond James Stadium, Tampa, Florida
TV Time: CBS 1:00 pm eastern

The Ravens opened the regular season on the road against the Tampa Bay Buccaneers on September 10. In QB Steve McNair’s inaugural start as a Raven, the team gave a dominating performance. RB Jamal Lewis got the team's first points as he ran into the endzone on a four-yard touchdown strike in the first quarter. Then, in the second quarter, CB Chris McAlister intercepted a pass from Tampa Bay QB Chris Simms and ran 60 yards for another touchdown. Rookie Haloti Ngata recorded his first career interception and also returned for 60 yards to set up kicker Matt Stover with a 20-yard field goal to put the Ravens up 17–0 at halftime. Baltimore continued to suppress Tampa Bay in the second half, as Stover kicked a 42-yard field goal in the third quarter to put Baltimore up 20–0. In the fourth quarter, McNair put the game away with a 4-yard pass to TE Daniel Wilcox. While the Ravens offense had a very good start to the 2006 season, the defense also showed much promise, as they forced Simms into throwing three interceptions and limited star RB Carnell "Cadillac" Williams to just 22 yards on eight carries. For his efforts in this game Ray Lewis was named NFL Defensive Player of the Week after recording 10 tackles and a sack. With the win, the Ravens were 1–0 and 1–0 against NFC Opponents.

==== Week 2: vs. Oakland Raiders ====
	1	2	3	4	Total
Raiders	0	3	0	3	6
Ravens	9	7	2	10	28

at M&T Bank Stadium, Baltimore, Maryland
TV Time: CBS 1:00 pm eastern

The Ravens opened Week 2 with a home-opener against the visiting Oakland Raiders. From the get-go, the Ravens dominated the game. The Ravens forced two fumbles by Oakland QB Aaron Brooks in the first quarter which led to two of Baltimore kicker's Matt Stover three field goals (25, 33, and 37-yarders). The Raiders would get on the board in the second quarter with a 34-yard field goal by opposing Sebastian Janikowski, but Baltimore would respond with QB Steve McNair completing a 1-yard touchdown pass to TE Todd Heap. In the third quarter, the only score of the period would be LB Adalius Thomas sacking QB Andrew Walter in the end zone for a safety. In the fourth quarter, Stover increased the Ravens' lead with a 23-yard field goal. Even though Oakland would get three points on Janikowski's 51-yard FG, Baltimore RB Mike Anderson put the game away on a 34-yard TD run. With another win, the Ravens advanced to 2–0.

==== Week 3: at Cleveland Browns ====
	1	2	3	4	Total
Ravens	3	0	0	12	15
Browns	0	14	0	0	14

at Cleveland Browns Stadium, Cleveland, Ohio
TV Time: CBS 4:05 pm eastern

The Ravens traveled to Cleveland, Ohio for an AFC North match-up with the Cleveland Browns. The Ravens struck first with kicker Matt Stover getting a 32-yard field goal. However, in the second quarter, their small lead was wiped out, as WR Braylon Edwards caught a 58-yard TD pass and QB Charlie Frye got a one-yard TD run. In the third quarter, both sides stiffened their defenses and prevented each other from scoring. In the fourth quarter, down by 2 points, McNair drove down the field to set Stover up for a 52-yard field goal. With 0:29 left in the 4th quarter the field goal provided the winning points. Steve McNair passed for 264 yards. He threw no interceptions and completed 23 passes out of 41. Jamal Lewis rushed for 86 yards. The leading receiver was Derrick Mason with 7 completions for 132 yards. The defense sacked Brown's quarterback Charlie Frye seven times. The defense also had one forced fumble and an interception. With their third straight win, the Ravens advanced to 3–0.

==== Week 4: vs. San Diego Chargers ====
	1	2	3	4	Total
Chargers	7	6	0	0	13
Ravens	7	0	0	9	16

at M&T Bank Stadium, Baltimore, Maryland
TV Time: CBS 1:00 pm eastern

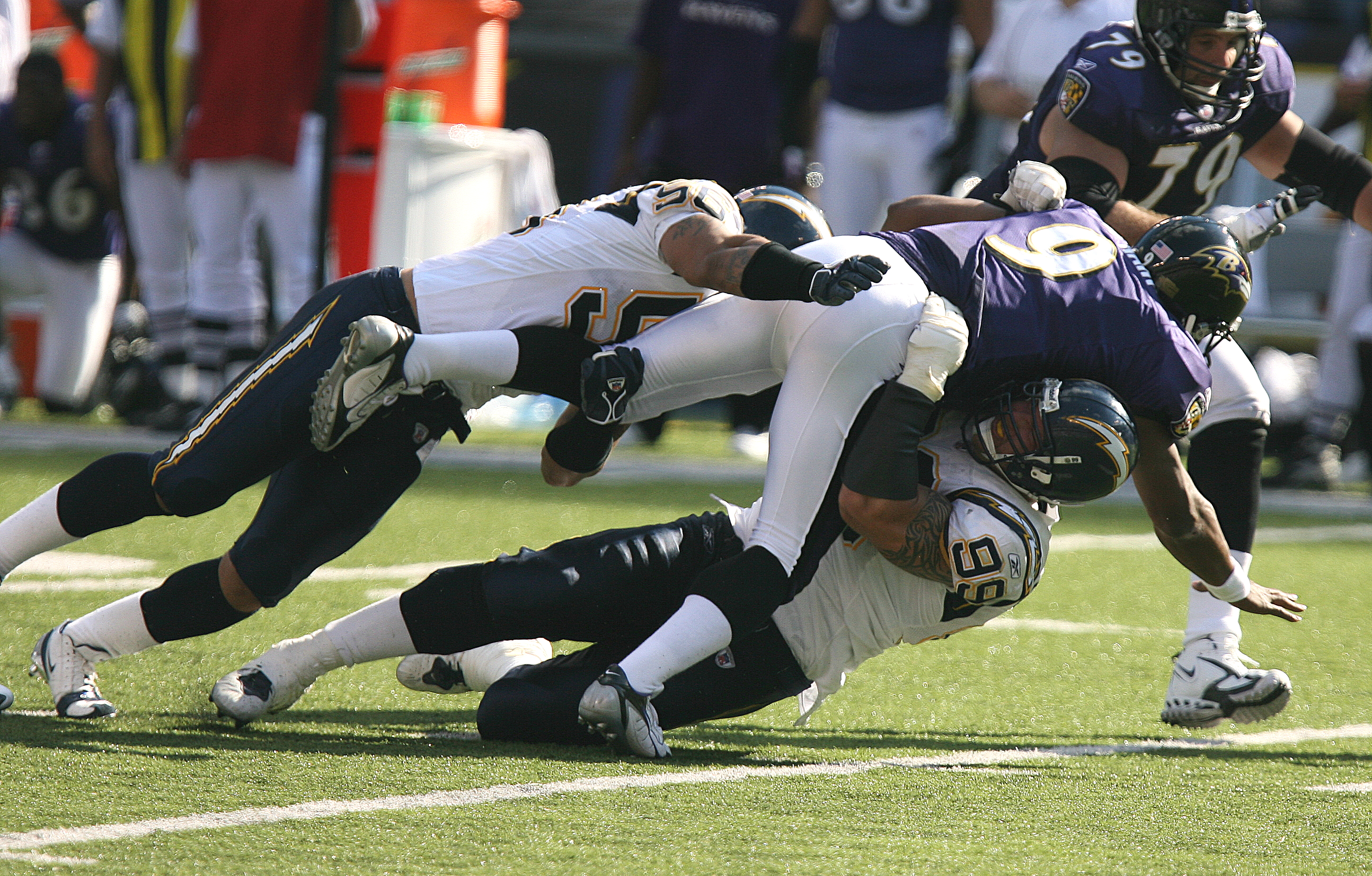
Steve McNair is tackled against San Diego

The Chargers visited Baltimore for the first time since 2000. The Chargers led down the field first with a 31-yard touchdown pass to WR Malcom Floyd. However, this was followed two drives later by an interception by OLB Bart Scott (who was named September's Defensive Player of the Month recently before the game), which led to a 5-yard touchdown pass from QB Steve McNair to TE Daniel Wilcox. In the second quarter, 2 Chargers field goals from kicker Nate Kaeding put San Diego in the lead at the half. In the third quarter, the Ravens' defense held the Chargers to no points. They were assisted by a loud stadium, which led to a fourth quarter intentional safety by Chargers punter Mike Scifres. The Ravens took the ball at the 40-yard line with 3:12 to go. After Derrick Mason dropped a possible touchdown pass early in the drive, a 10-yard pass to TE Todd Heap won the game with 30 seconds to play. On the touchdown catch, Heap broke a tackle from Shawne Merriman. With the win, the Ravens were 4–0 for the first time in their 11-year history. However, Guard Edwin Mulitalo was injured for the entire season with a triceps injury.

==== Week 5: at Denver Broncos ====
	1	2	3	4	Total
Ravens	3	0	0	0	3
Broncos	3	0	0	10	13

at Invesco Field at Mile High, Denver, Colorado
TV Time: ESPN 8:30 pm eastern

The Ravens suffered their first loss of the season as they were beaten 13–3 by the Denver Broncos. In a defensive struggle most of the game, Steve McNair was intercepted three times and Jamal Lewis was held to 43 yards rushing.

The Ravens got on the board first when Matt Stover kicked a 24-yard field goal, following a fumble by Broncos RB Tatum Bell. The Broncos responded with a 43-yard field goal of their own by Jason Elam. The Ravens drove deep into Broncos territory late at the end of the first half, but that drive was thwarted as Steve McNair was intercepted by Champ Bailey in the end zone on a pass intended for Clarence Moore. The third quarter saw no points scored by either team as the defensive struggle continued. The Broncos controlled the clock in the second half with the running game led by Tatum Bell, who atoned for his fumble in the first quarter, by bouncing back with 92 yards rushing. Ravens QB McNair was intercepted again by Darrent Williams, which led to a Jake Plummer to Rod Smith touchdown pass. McNair was intercepted a third time, ending the Ravens' final drive, this time by Domonique Foxworth. With their first loss, the Ravens dropped to 4–1.

==== Week 6: vs. Carolina Panthers ====
	1	2	3	4	Total
Panthers	3	10	0	10	23
Ravens	0	7	0	14	21

at M&T Bank Stadium, Baltimore, Maryland

The Ravens lost their second straight game in a contest with the Carolina Panthers.

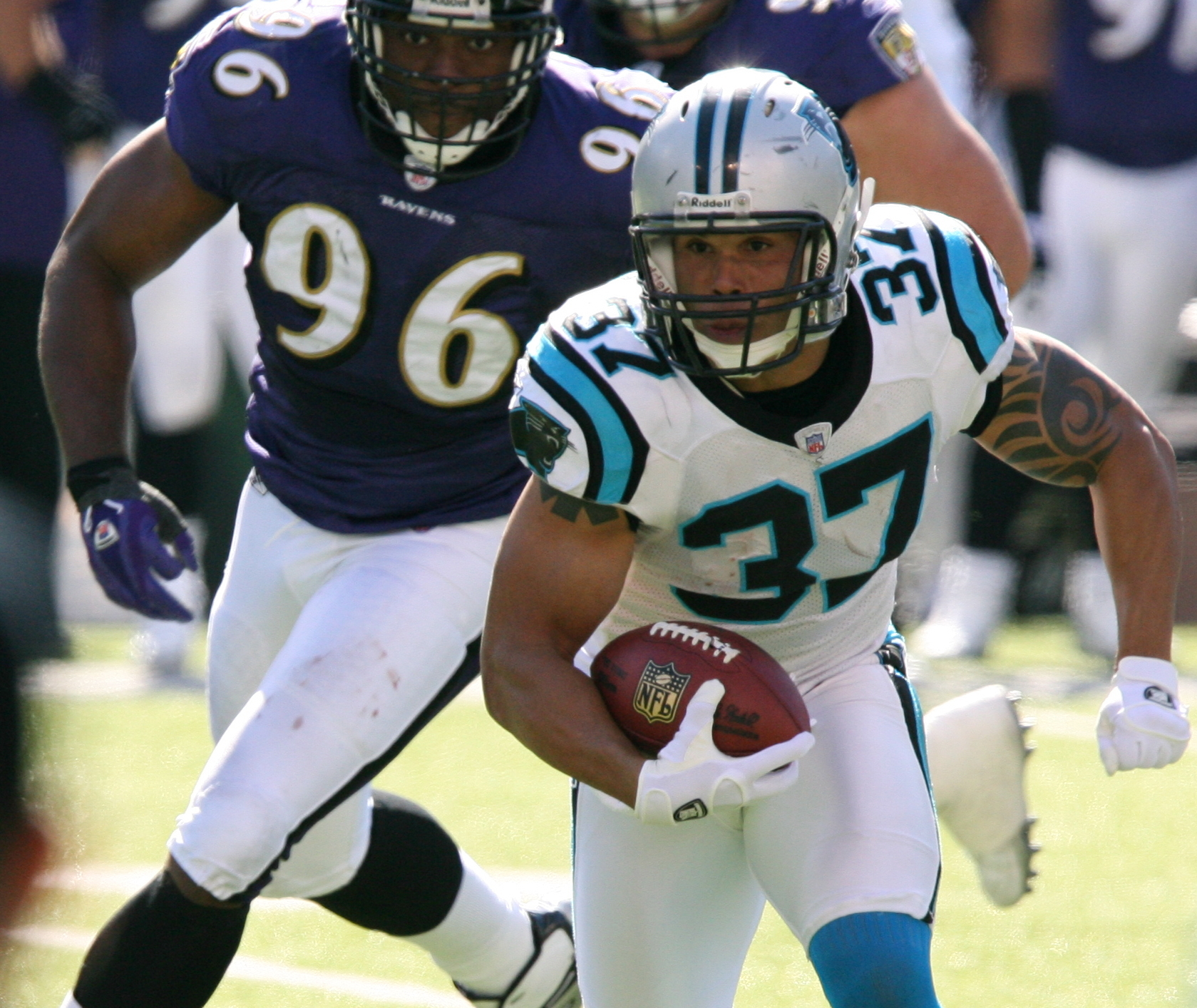
Adalius Thomas chases Carolina's Nick Goings, week 6

The Panthers got on the board first with a 21-yard field goal by kicker John Kasay. Ravens quarterback Steve McNair was knocked out in the first quarter with a concussion, and backup Kyle Boller took over, connecting on a touchdown pass with Mark Clayton, on a pass intended for Derrick Mason that was tipped to Clayton. The Panthers responded when Drew Carter caught a 42-yard touchdown pass from Jake Delhomme, and Kasay kicked another field goal, this time from 31 yards. The Panthers went into halftime with a 13–7 lead.

The third quarter was scoreless, and midway through the fourth quarter, Panthers kicker Kasay kicked his third field goal of the day from 21 yards out. Ravens wide receiver Clayton caught his second touchdown pass from Boller, again on a tipped pass, bringing the score to 16–14 Carolina. Panthers quarterback Delhomme continued his career day, this time throwing a 72-yard touchdown pass to wide receiver Steve Smith. Delhomme threw for a career-high 365 yards. Ravens tight end Todd Heap caught a 7-yard pass from Boller in the final minutes, but it wasn't enough as the Panthers extended their current winning streak to four games. The loss dropped the Ravens to 4–2, and 1–1 against NFC Opponents.

==== Week 7: Bye week ====
On Tuesday, October 17, 2006, it was reported that Ravens head coach Brian Billick fired offensive coordinator Jim Fassel and that he had taken over Fassel's job of offensive coordinator. Also with the Bengals’ loss this week the Ravens were also able to take the lead of the AFC North.

==== Week 8: at New Orleans Saints ====
	1	2	3	4	Total
Ravens	7	21	7	0	35
Saints	0	7	0	15	22

at the Louisiana Superdome, New Orleans, Louisiana

In Steve McNair's return from a strained neck and concussion last week, he dominated while running for one touchdown and threw for 2. The Baltimore Ravens snapped a 2-game losing streak with this 35–22 win October 29, 2006. The Ravens defense was excellent as well. They had four interceptions, two for touchdowns by Ronnie Prude and Dawan Landry, and a fumble recovery. Bart Scott knocked Reggie Bush out of the game with an ankle injury in the fourth quarter. This was the first game the New Orleans Saints have lost in the Louisiana Superdome since the stadium reopened for the 2006 season.

First quarter consisted of a five-yard quarterback draw by Steve McNair which made the score 7–0. Early in the second quarter, Clarence Moore caught a short four-yard pass in the endzone to make it 14–0. About 6 minutes later, Ronnie Prude intercepted Drew Brees for a 12-yard interception return. Later on, Drew Brees passed to Joe Horn for a 32-yard touchdown pass to make it 21–7. Late in the second quarter tight end Todd Heap was passed a ball that was another Baltimore touchdown to make it 28–7 at halftime.

In the third quarter Dawan Landry intercepted Drew Brees for 12 yards for another Baltimore score to make it 35–7 Baltimore. In the fourth quarter, Drew Brees passed to Marques Colston for a 47-yard touchdown to make it 35–14. Then Drew Brees passed to Marques Colston for a 25-yard touchdown catch. A 2-point conversion was made to make it 35–22. New Orleans went for an onside kick but it failed so the Baltimore Ravens won by the score of 35–22. With the win, the Ravens advanced to 5–2 and 2–1 against NFC Opponents.

Jamal Lewis ran for 109 yards on 31 attempts. Steve McNair ran for 23 yards on 5 carries and completed 17 passes out of 23 for 159 yards.

==== Week 9: vs. Cincinnati Bengals ====
	1	2	3	4	Total
Bengals	0	7	3	10	20
Ravens	14	3	6	3	26

at M&T Bank Stadium, Baltimore, Maryland

Riding high from their road win over the Saints, the Ravens returned home for an AFC North showdown with the Cincinnati Bengals. In the first quarter, RB Jamal Lewis got a touchdown on a 2-yard run. Afterwards, the defense did some stepping up, as CB Samari Rolle got an interception at the Bengals 49-yard line. He ran 24 yards and then lateraled the ball to Free Safety Ed Reed who returned it the remaining 25 yards for a touchdown. In the second quarter, kicker Matt Stover kicked a 43-yard field goal to give Baltimore a dominating lead. The Bengals would finally score, as QB Carson Palmer completed a 26-yard TD pass to WR T. J. Houshmandzadeh. In the third quarter, Stover helped the Ravens increase their lead with two more field goals (a 25-yarder and a 36-yarder). Cincinnati would have kicker Shayne Graham nail a 51-yard field goal. In the fourth quarter, the Bengals drew closer, as RB Rudi Johnson got a 4-yard TD run. Stover would give Baltimore one more field goal, which came from 35 yards out. Even though Cincinnati would get a 31-yard field goal from Graham, the Ravens held on to win and improve to 6–2.

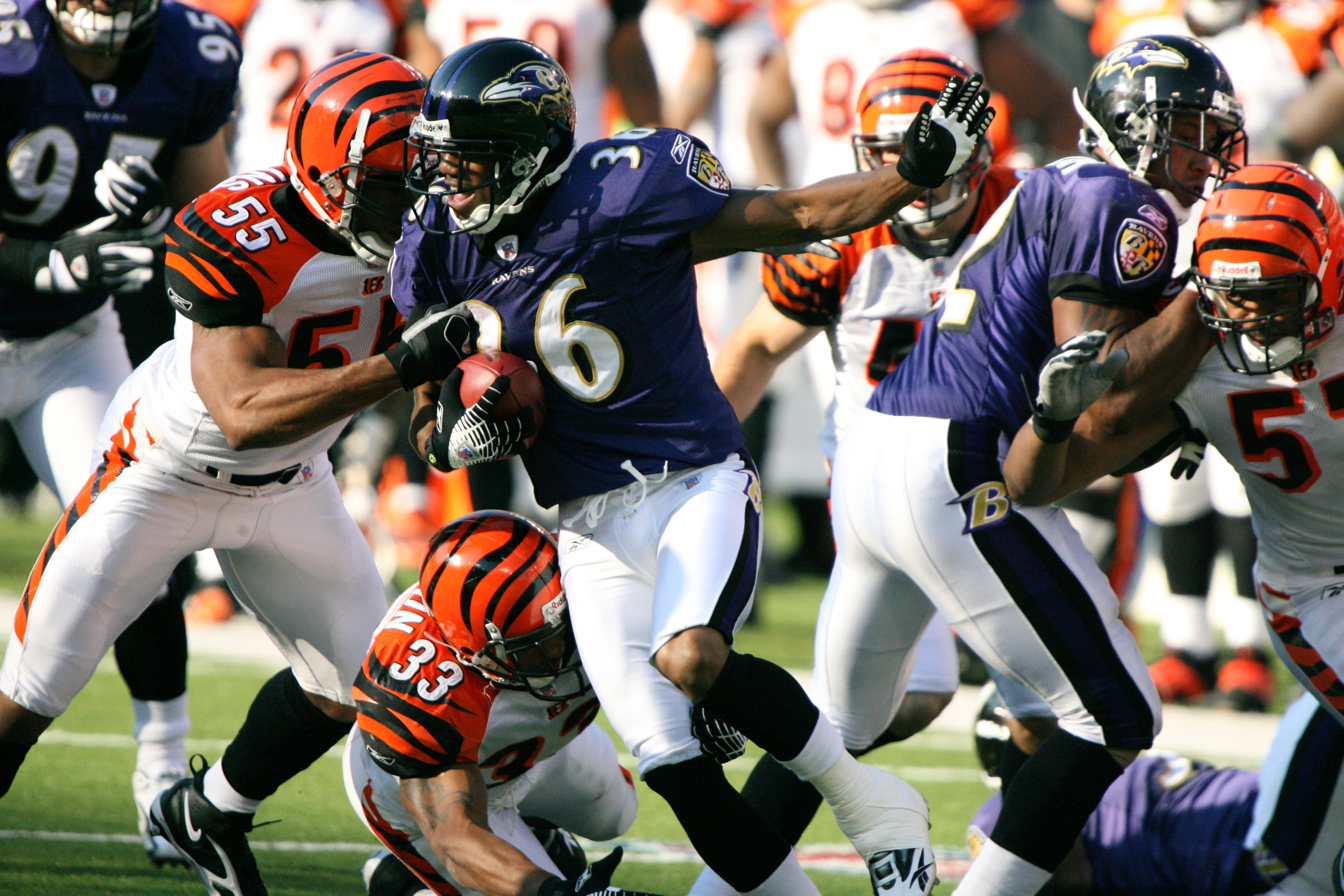
B.J. Sams against the Bengals

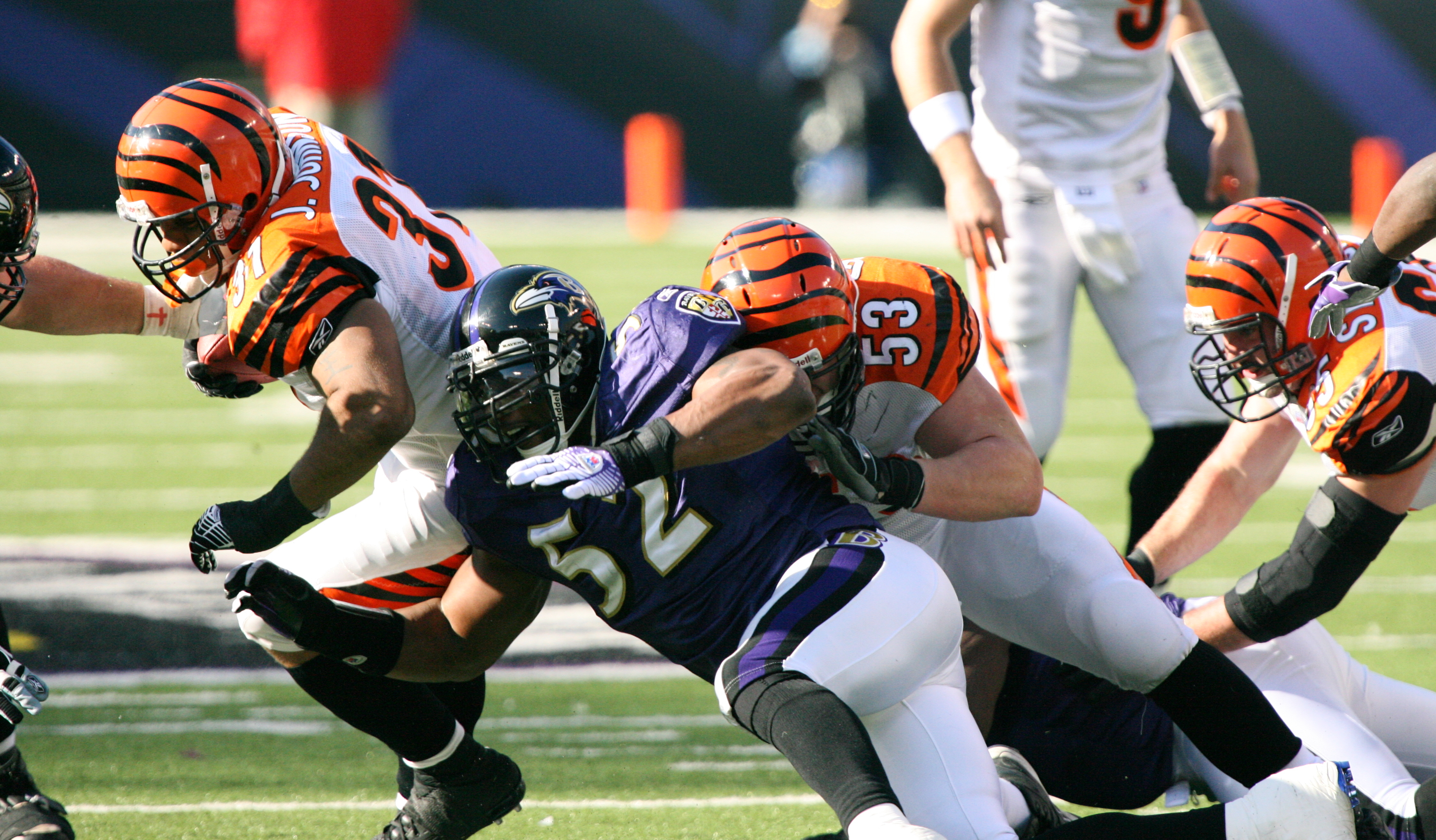
Jeremi Johnson runs the ball, Ray Lewis misses tackling him

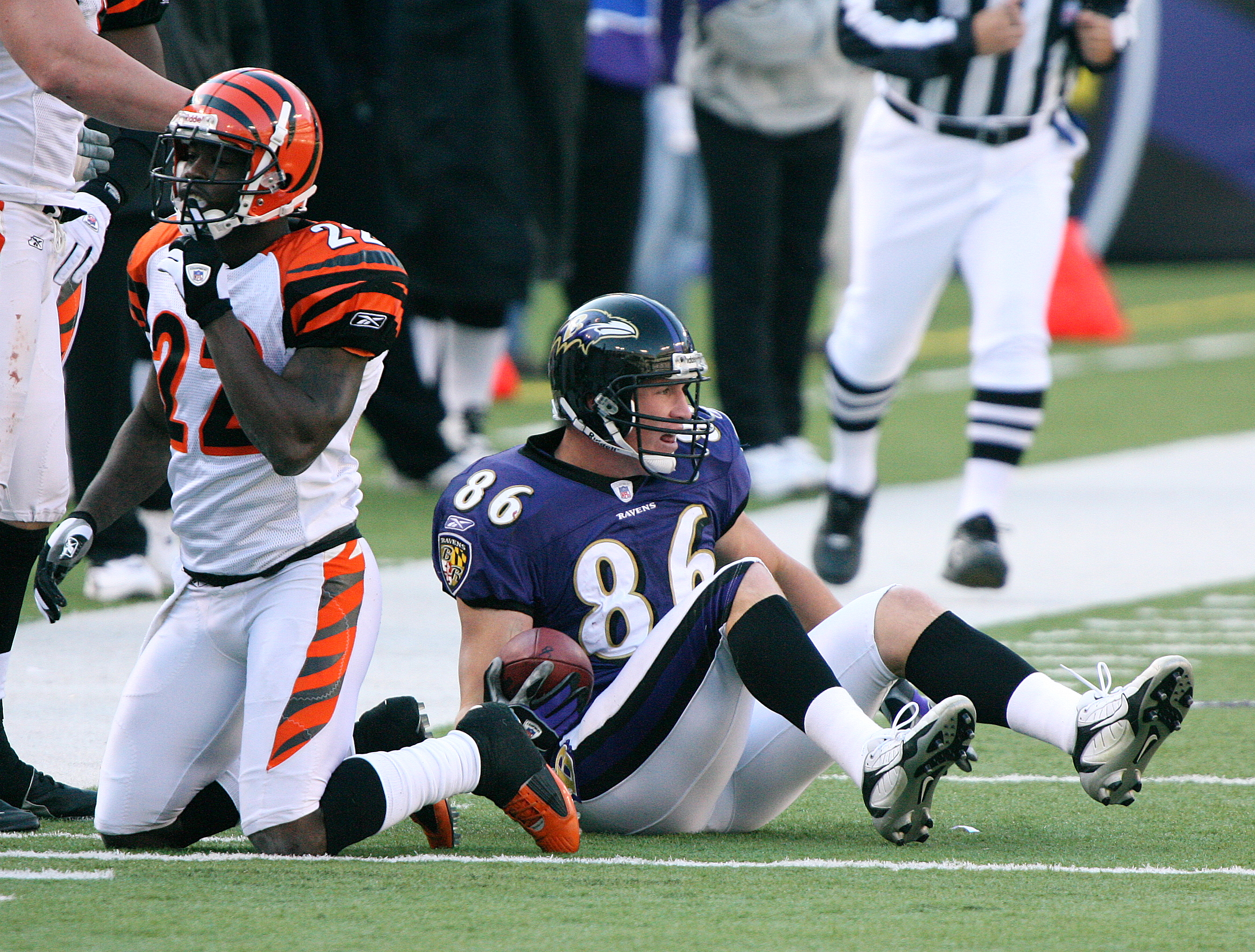
Johnathan Joseph and Todd Heap

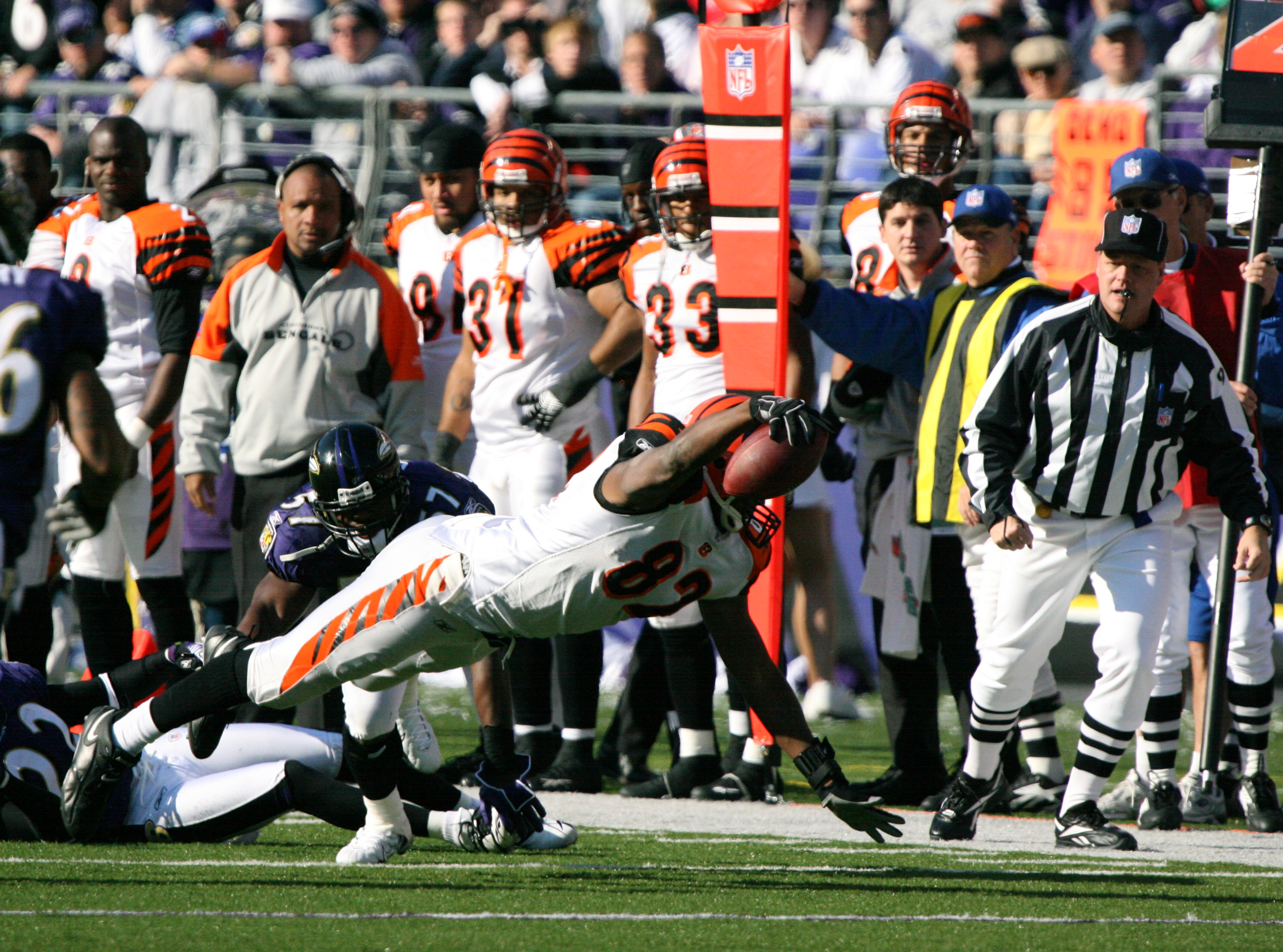
Diving catch by Reggie Kelly

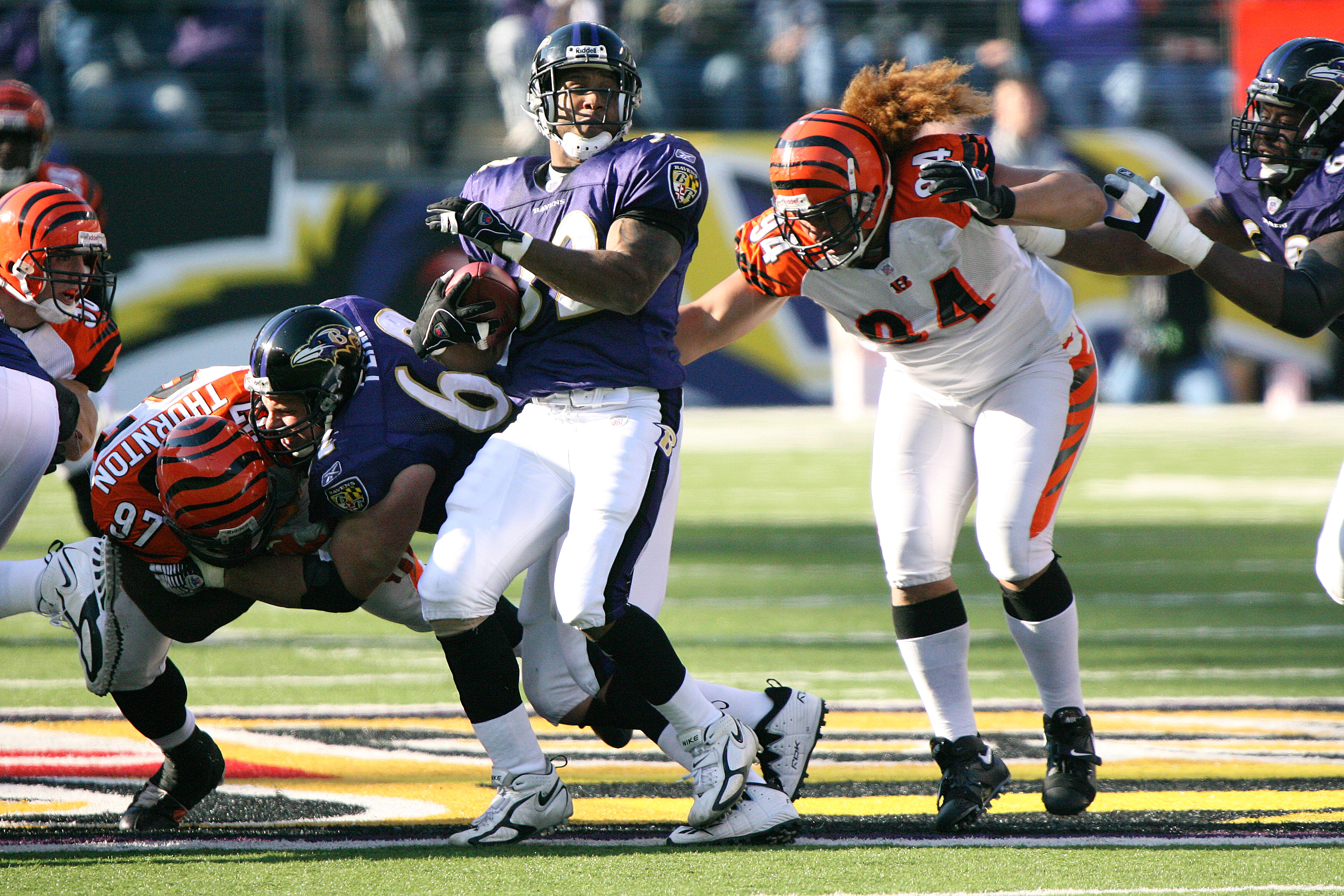
Domata Peko tackles Musa Smith

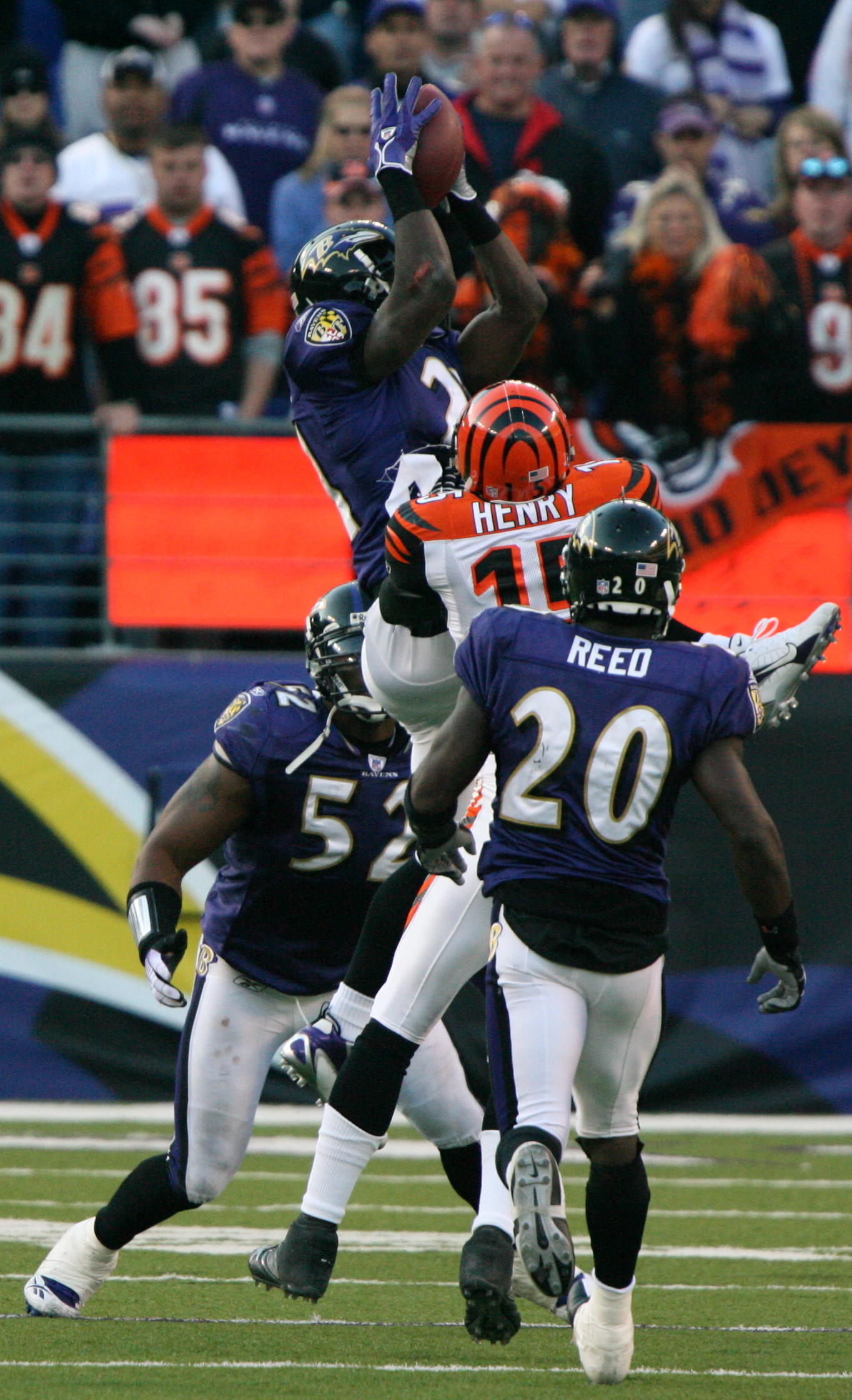
Baltimore makes an interception against Chris Henry (wide receiver)

==== Week 10: at Tennessee Titans ====
	1	2	3	4	Total
Ravens	7	10	0	10	27
Titans	12	14	0	0	26

at LP Field, Nashville, Tennessee

For this road game of former AFC Central rivals, QB Steve McNair would go up against his successor and his former team, QB Vince Young and the Tennessee Titans. In the first quarter, the Titans struck first with kicker Rob Bironas nailing a 21-yard field goal. The Ravens would respond with McNair completing a 65-yard TD pass to WR Mark Clayton. However, Tennessee started showing signs of an upset, as Young got a 2-yard TD run, while DE Tony Brown got to McNair in the endzone for a safety. In the second quarter, the Titans continued their dominance with TE Bo Scaife getting a 13-yard TD run and RB Travis Henry getting a 1-yard TD. Afterwards, Baltimore responded with McNair completing a 30-yard TD pass to FB Ovie Mughelli, along with kicker Matt Stover ending the half with a 27-yard field goal. After a scoreless third quarter, Stover completed a 40-yard field goal and McNair completed an 11-yard TD pass to WR Derrick Mason to take the lead. The Ravens ended any chance of a Titans upset by blocking a game-winning field goal attempt as time expired. With the win, they improved to 7–2.

==== Week 11: vs. Atlanta Falcons ====
	1	2	3	4	Total
Falcons	7	0	3	0	10
Ravens	0	0	17	7	24

at M&T Bank Stadium, Baltimore, Maryland

Kicker Matt Stover lost his consecutive field goals-made streak, yet the Ravens were able to beat the visiting Atlanta Falcons 24–10. Using the kick/punt returns by returner B.J. Sams, the Ravens rallied in the second half to win. After being scoreless in the first half, RB Jamal Lewis finished with a 91-yard, 3-TD performance, ending his 35-game multi-TD drought. QB Steve McNair completed 24 out of 34 passes for 236 yards. The leading receiver was Mark Clayton, who had 5 receptions for 89 yards. With the win, the Ravens improved to 8–2.

==== Week 12: vs. Pittsburgh Steelers ====
	1	2	3	4	Total
Steelers	0	0	0	0	0
Ravens	7	10	7	3	27

at M&T Bank Stadium, Baltimore, Maryland

The Ravens collected their second shutout of the season against the Steelers. The defense set a new team record by collecting 9 sacks against the strong Pittsburgh Steelers offense. Todd Heap and Steve McNair hooked up to score the first touchdown of the game in the 1st quarter. Jamal Lewis rushed for the second touchdown in the second quarter. Adalius Thomas returned a fumble by Pittsburgh quarterback Ben Roethlisberger for a touchdown in the 3rd quarter. The 27-point margin of victory was the Ravens’ largest against the Steelers to this point (since surpassed on September 11, 2011, when the Ravens won 35–7), and the second shutout recorded against the Steelers this season. After being sidelined for 2 games, Ray Lewis returned to the lineup and recorded one of the 9 sacks. With the win, the Ravens improved to 9–2.

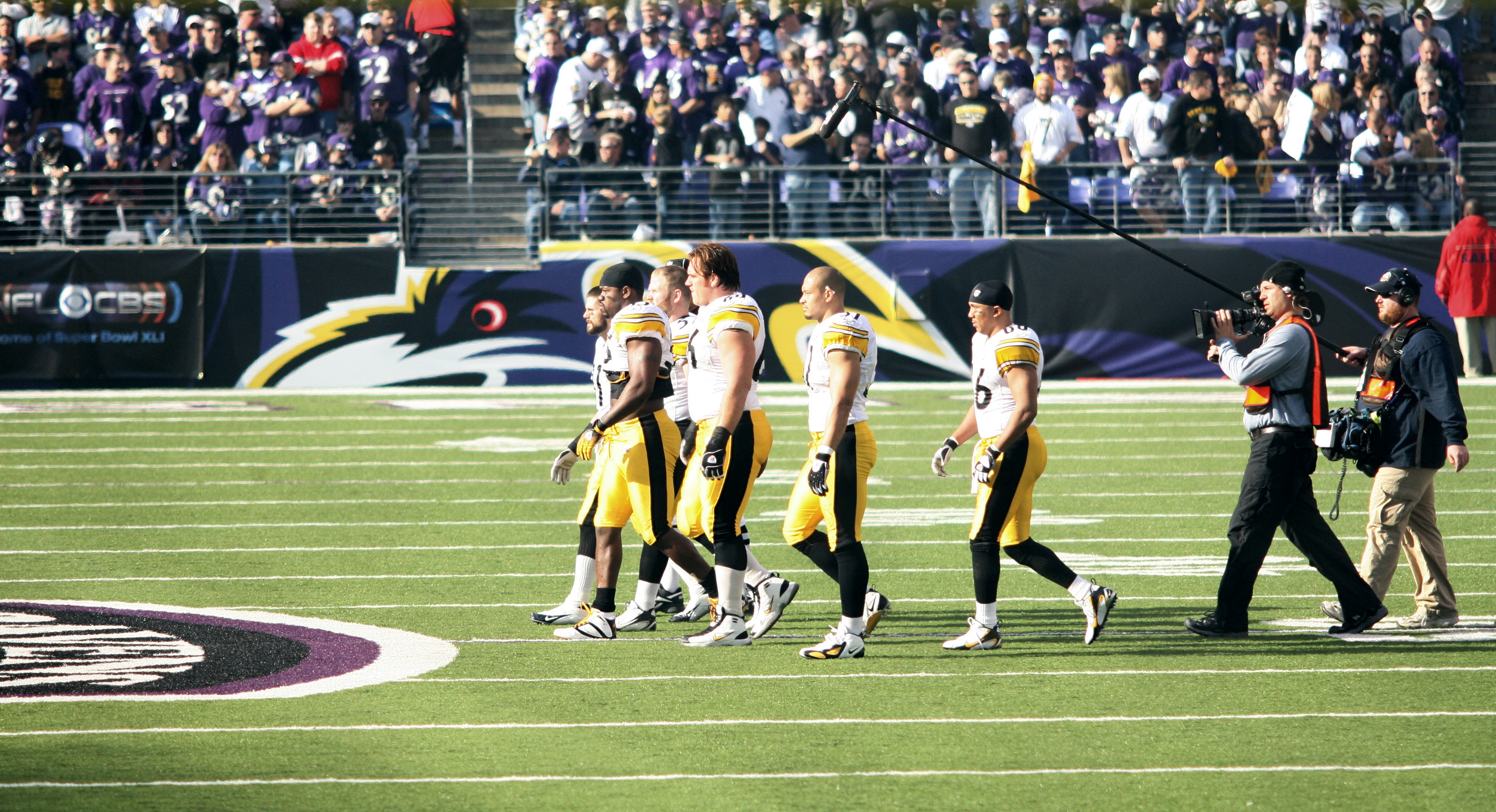
Pittsburgh captains approach midfield for the coin toss

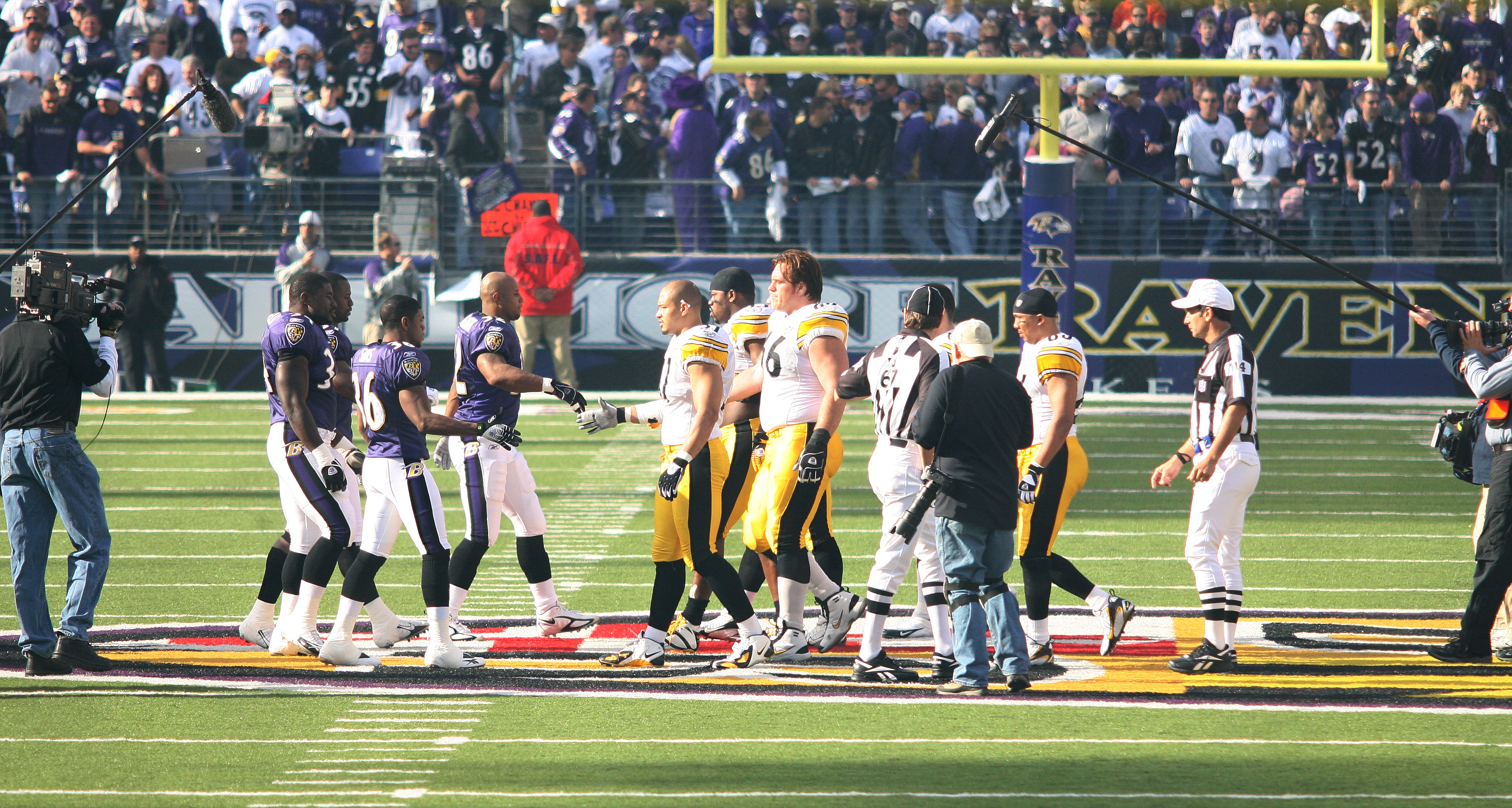
Steelers and Ravens players before the coin toss

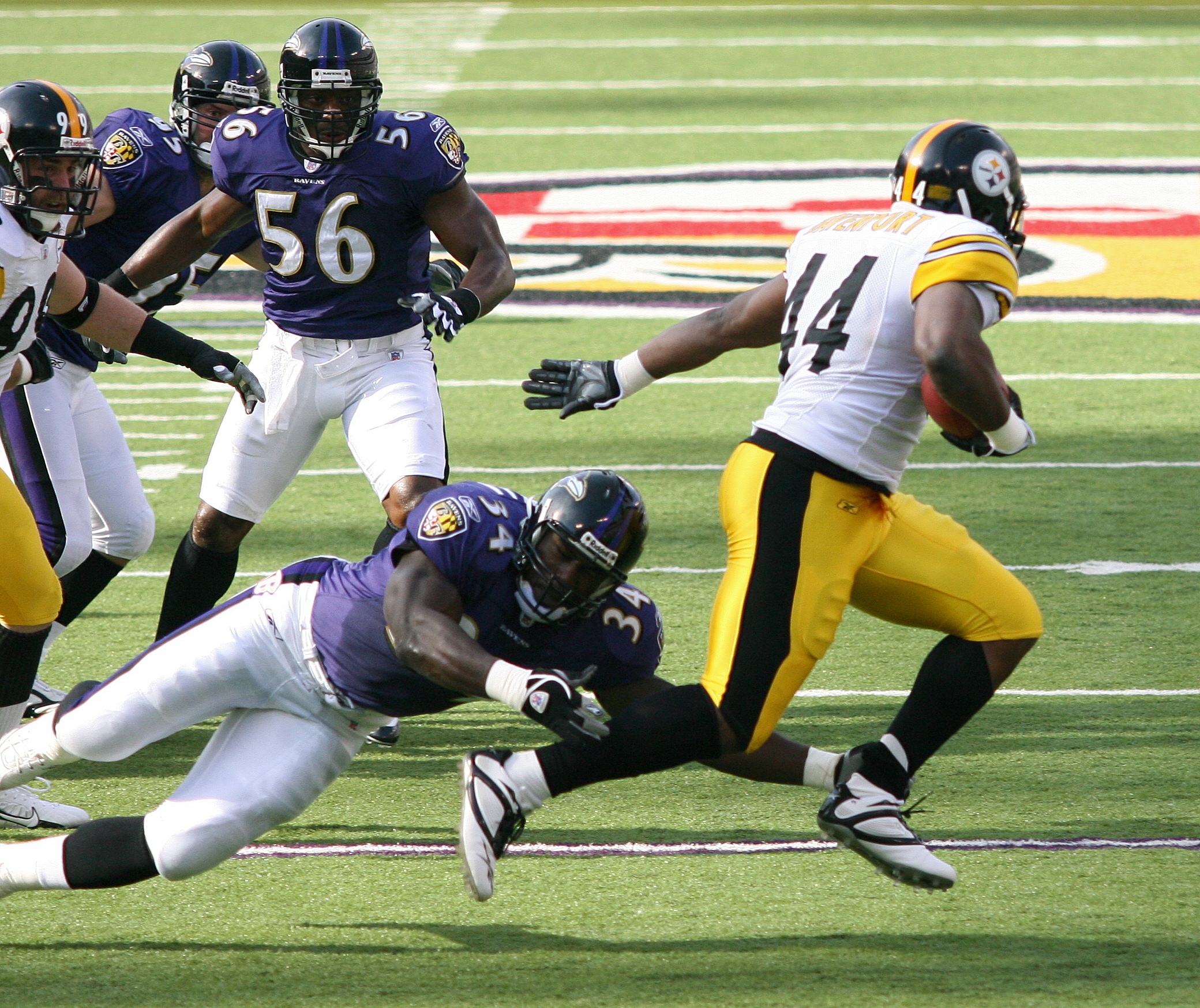
Baltimore pursue Pittsburgh's Najeh Davenport

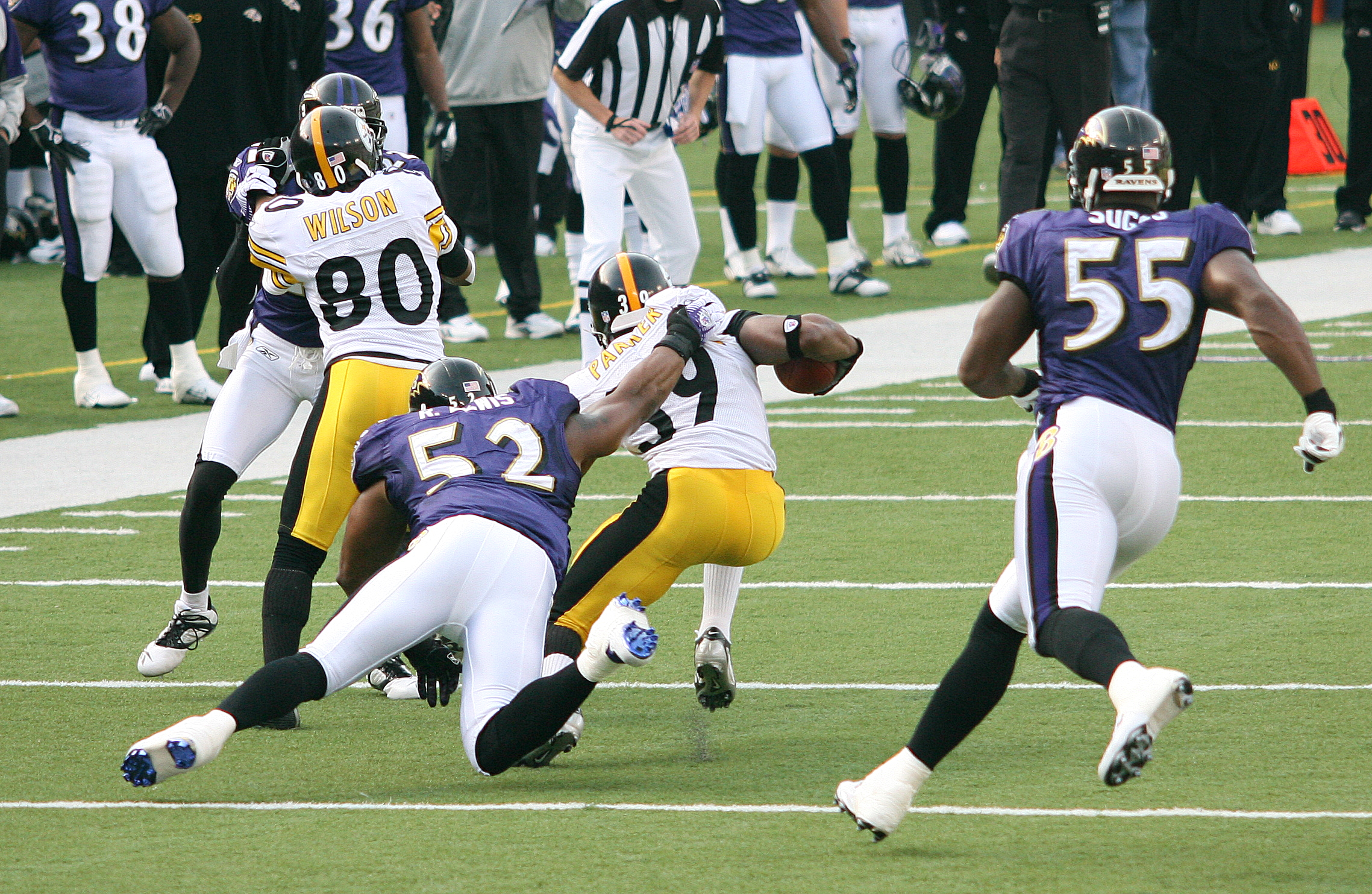
Ray Lewis tackles Willie Parker

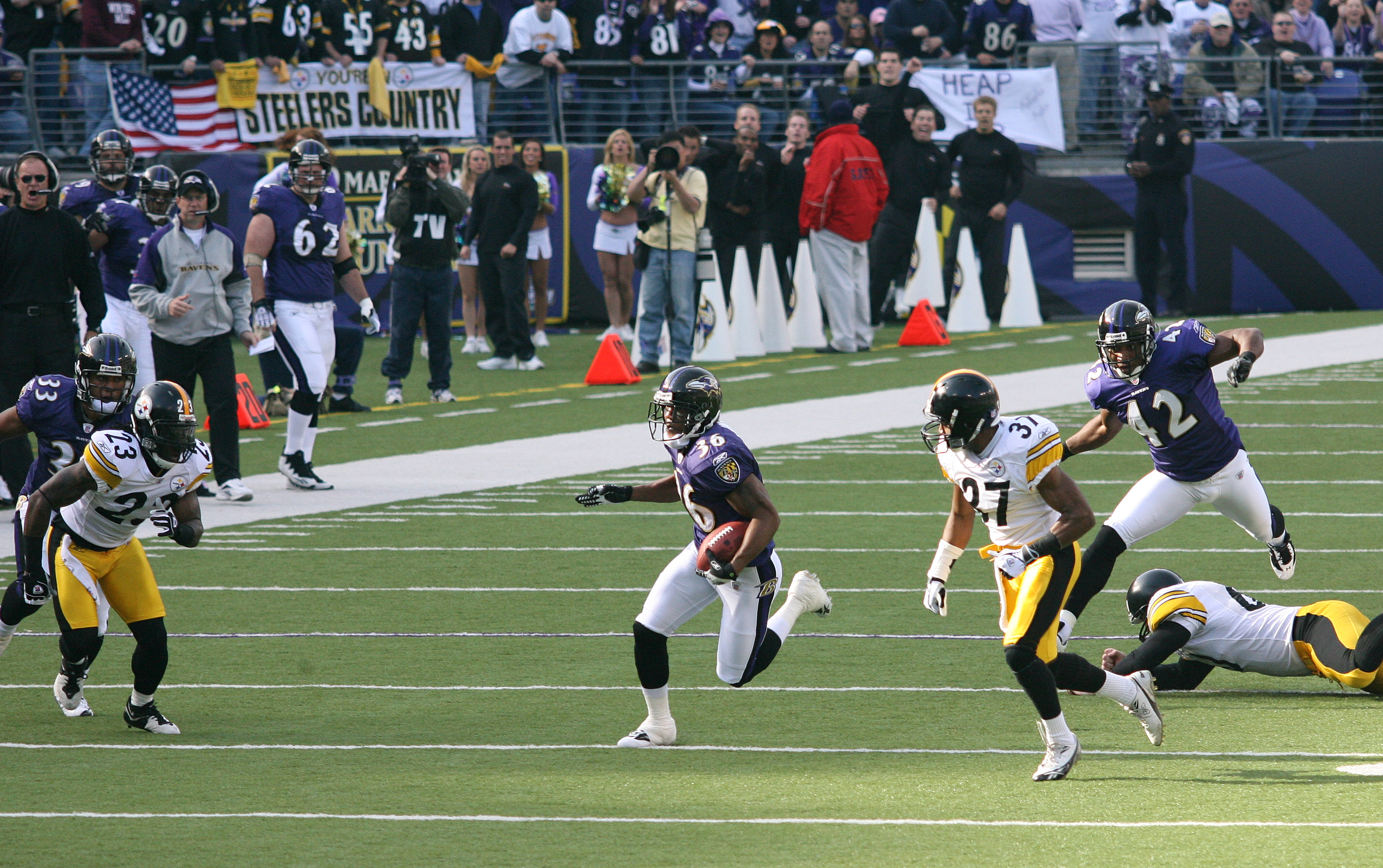
Baltimore on offense

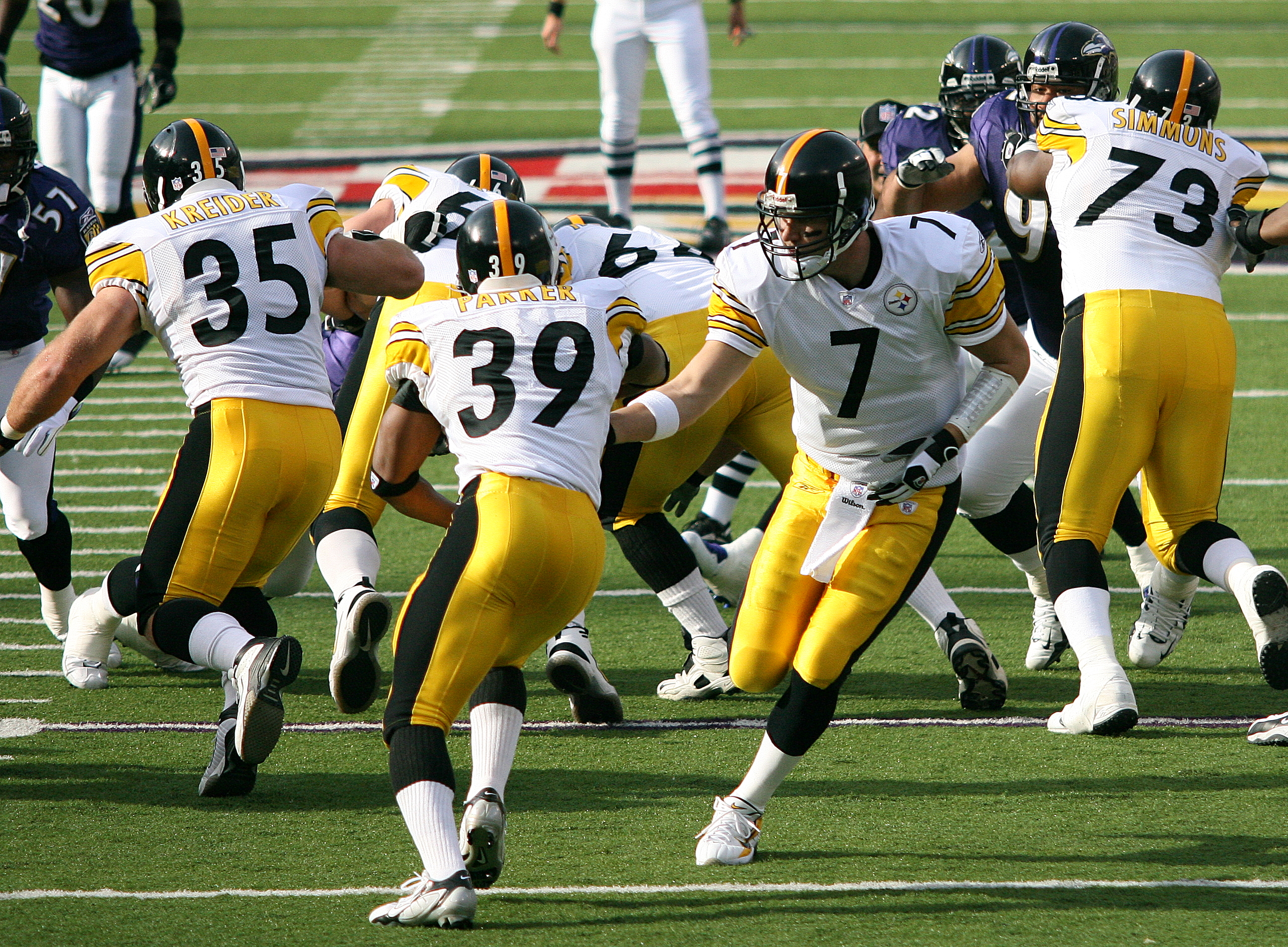
Ben Roethlisberger hands off to Willie Parker

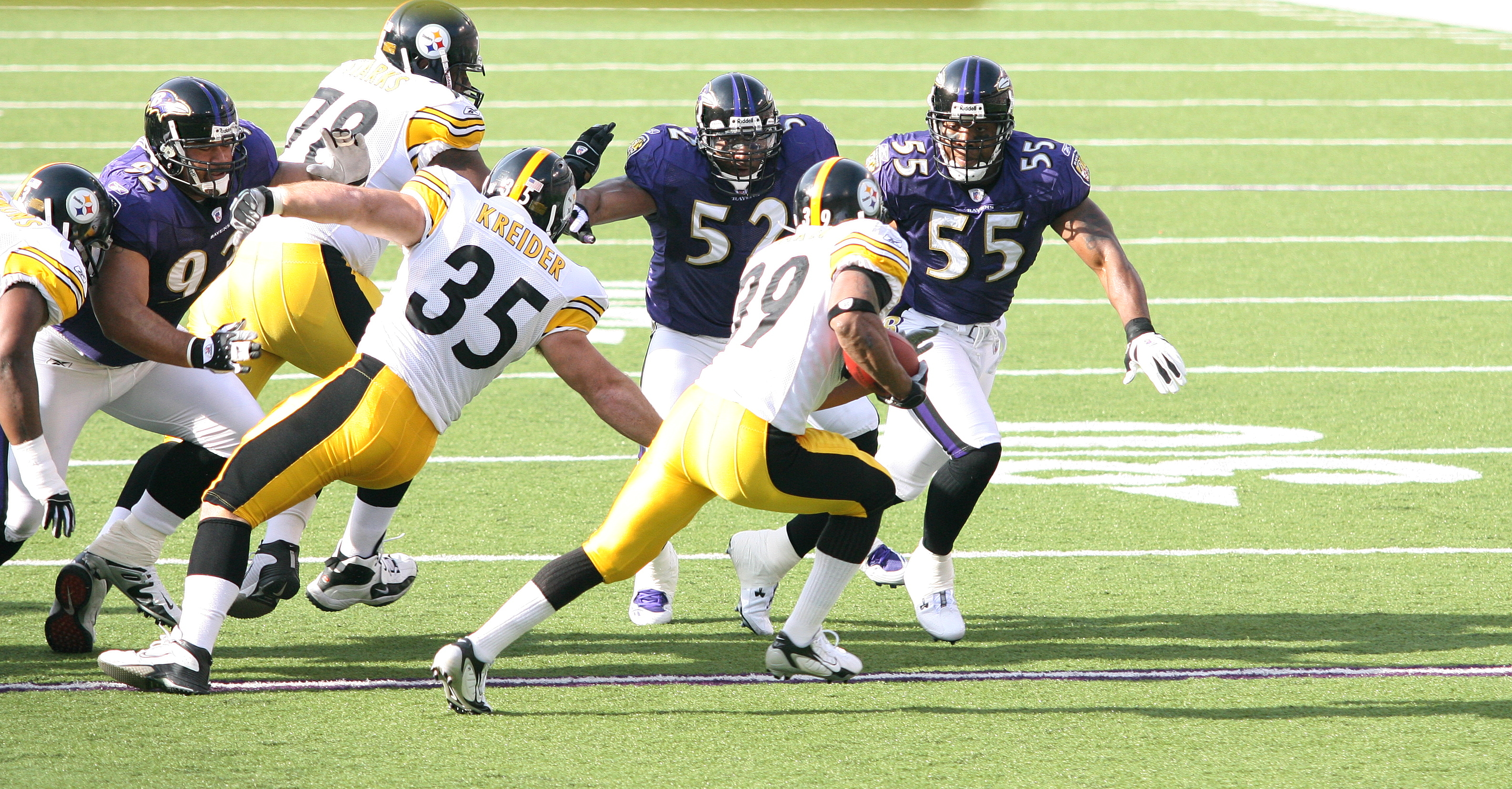
The Ravens face Willie Parker

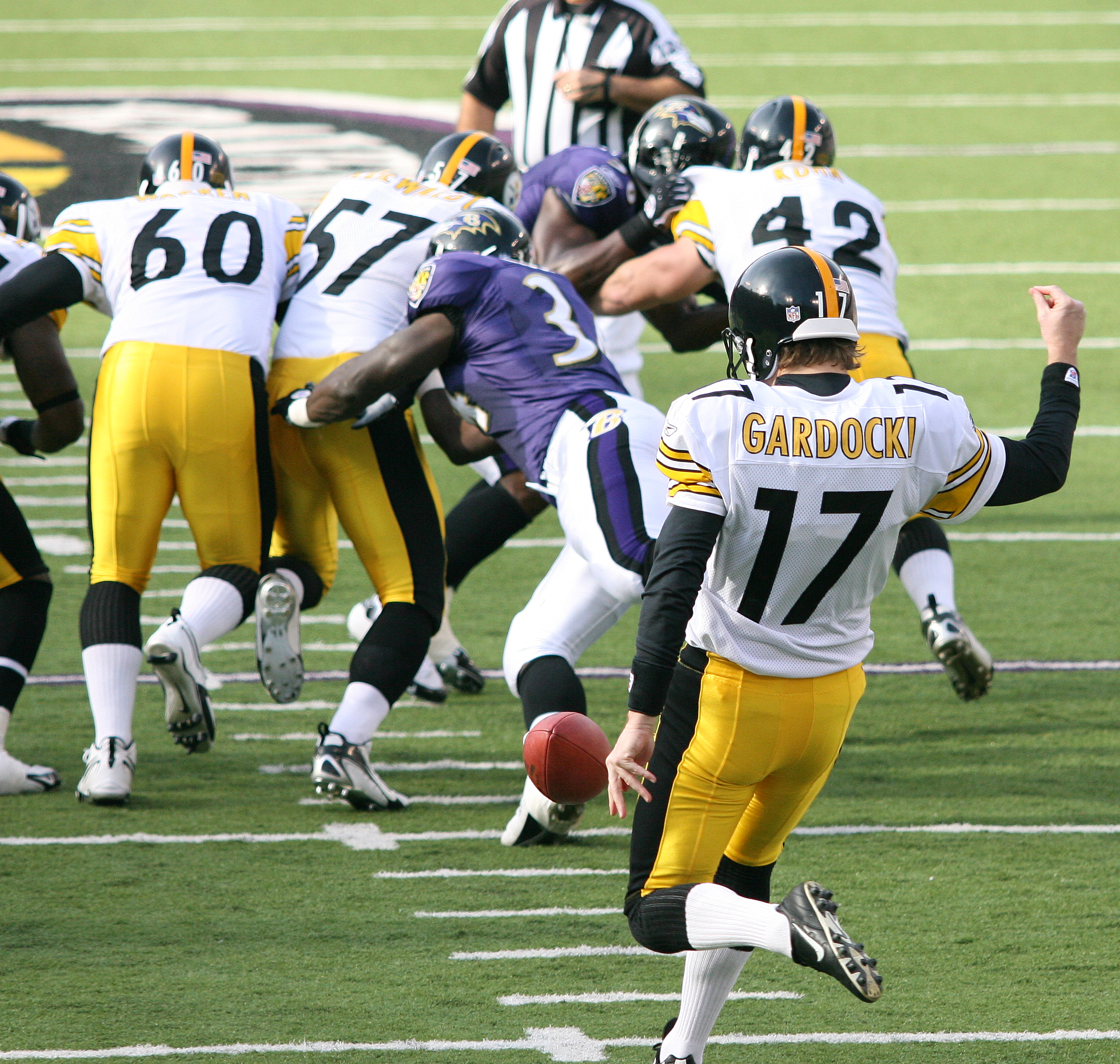
Chris Gardocki punts for Pittsburgh

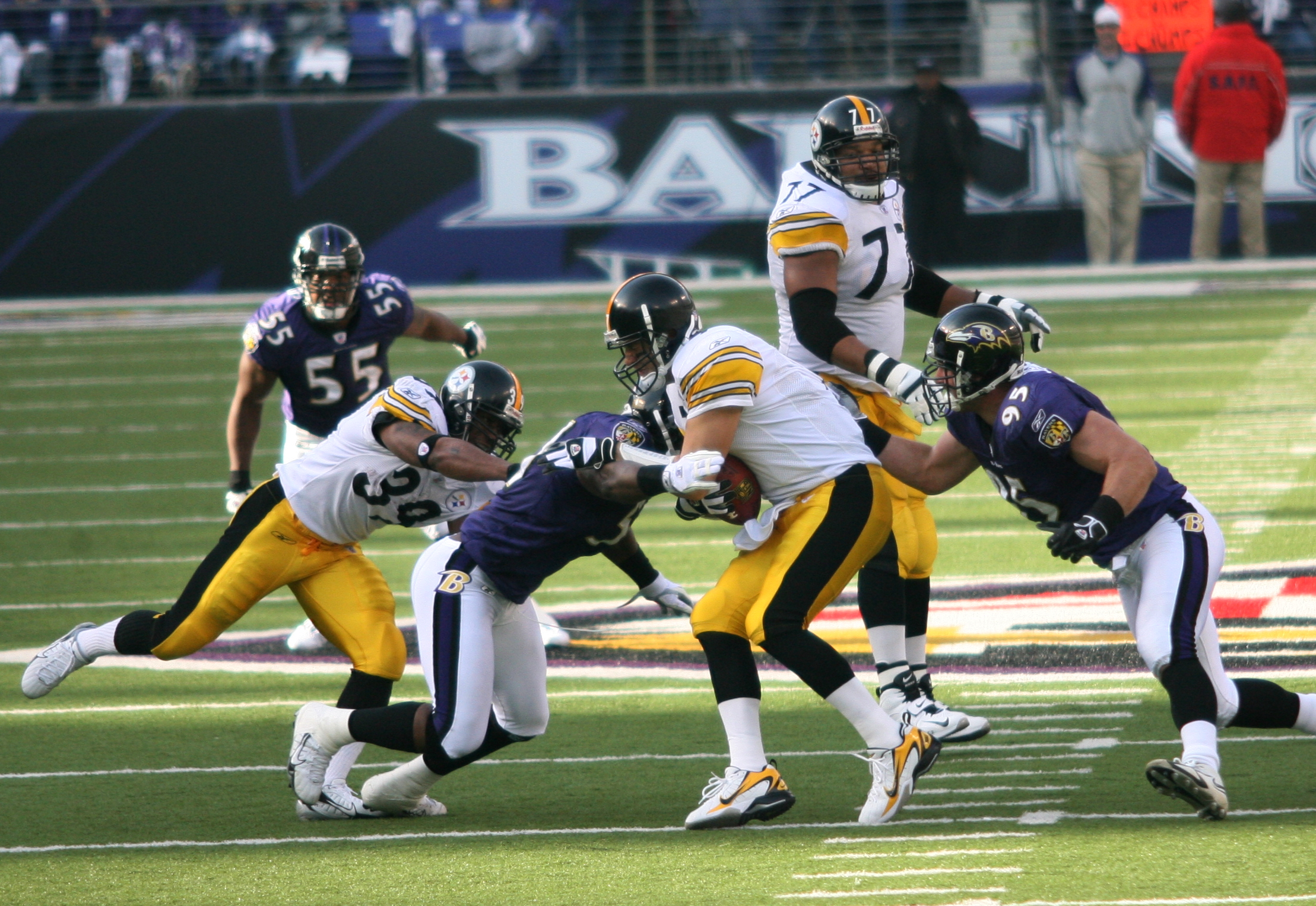
Baltimore sacks Ben Roethlisberger

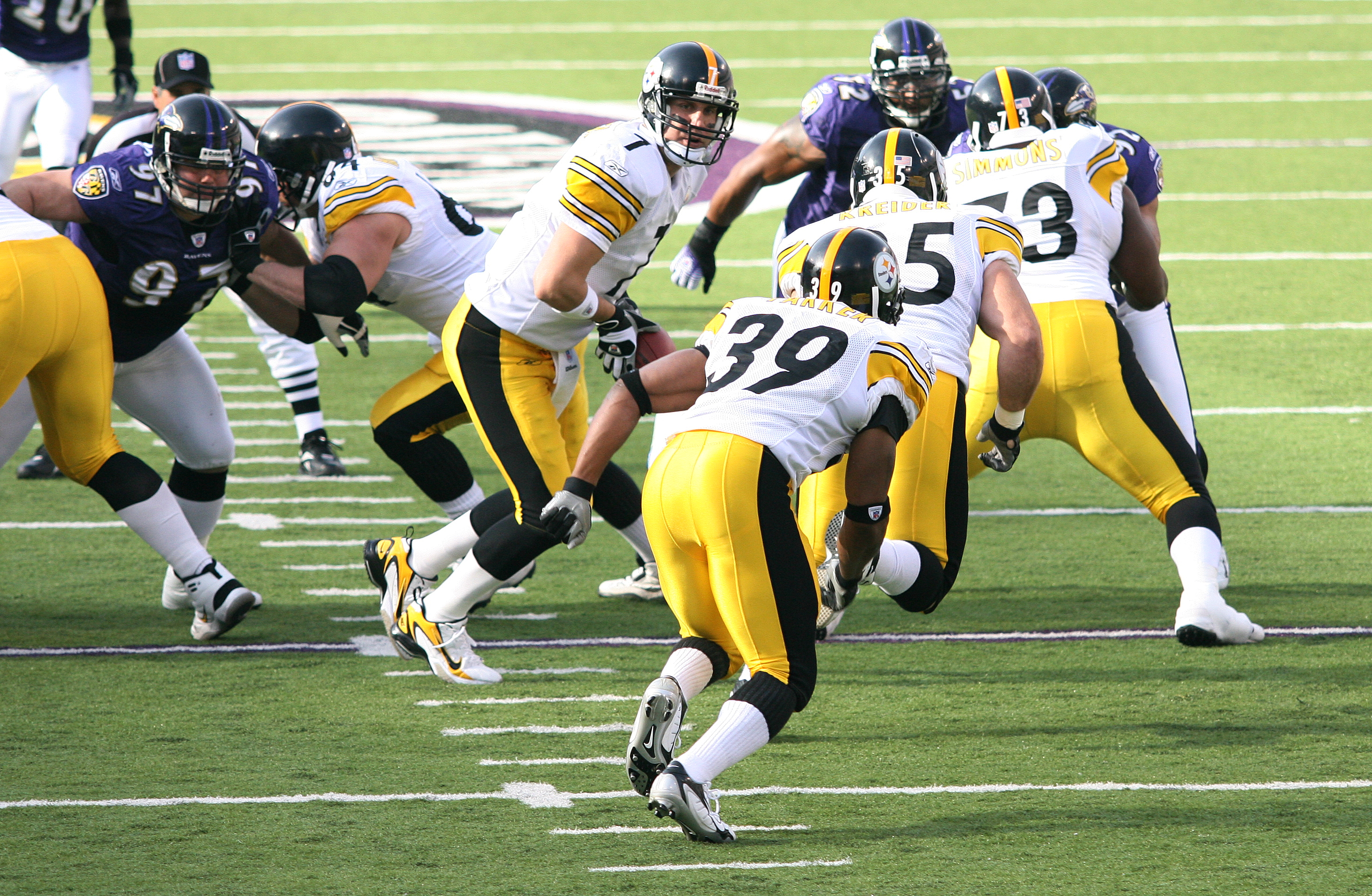
Handoff to Parker

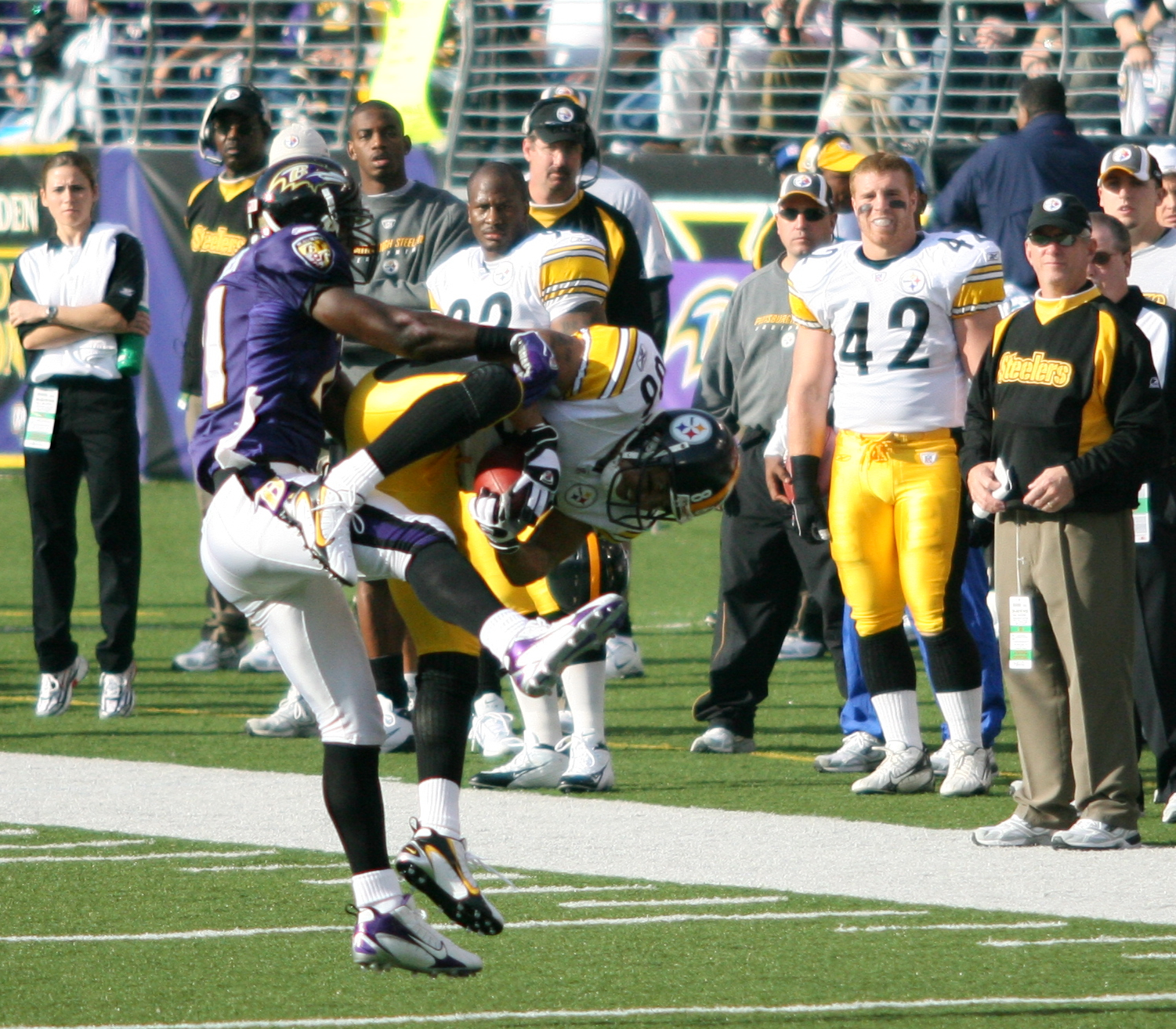
Hines Ward catches

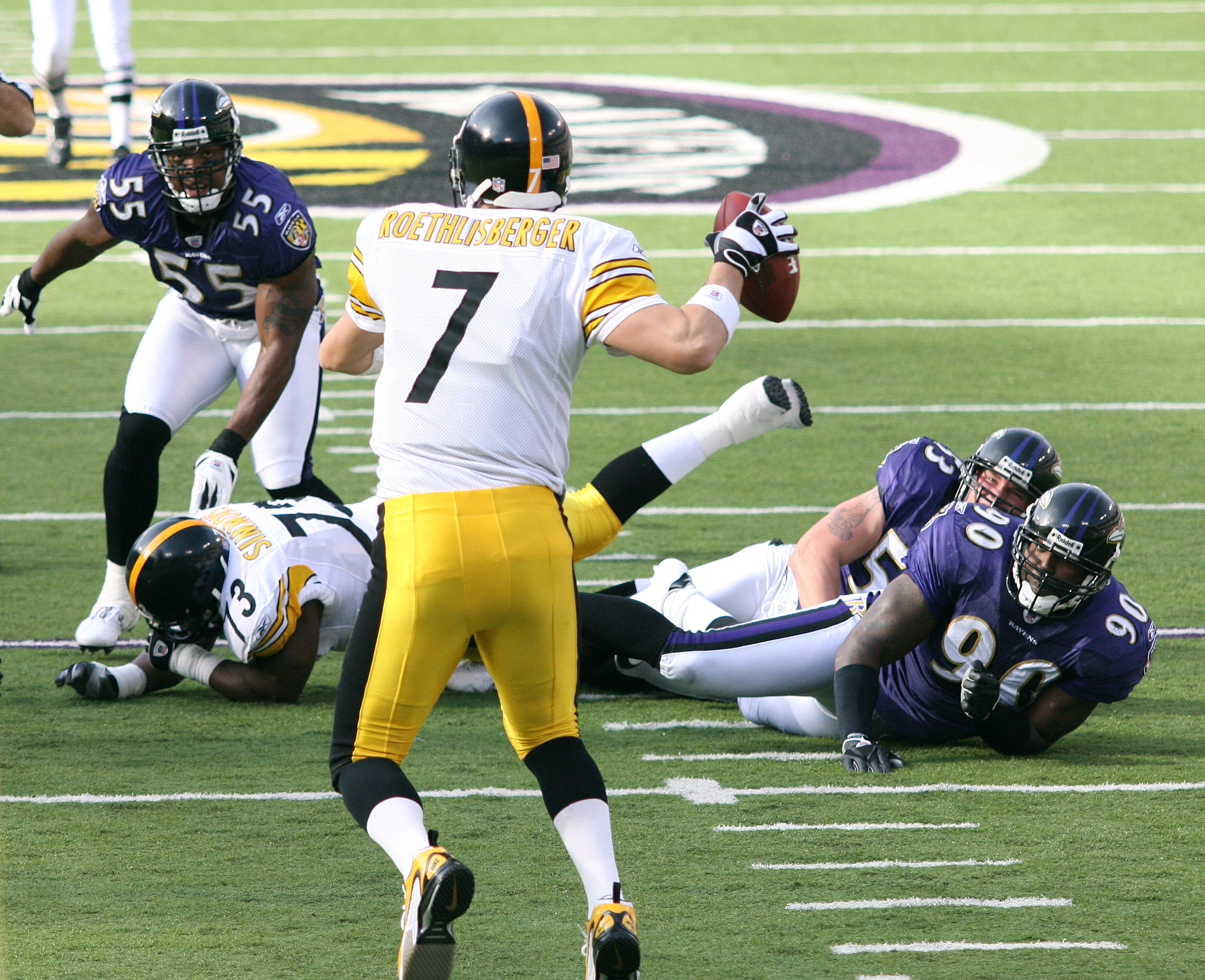
Roethlisberger prepares to throw

==== Week 13: at Cincinnati Bengals ====
	1	2	3	4	Total
Ravens	0	0	0	7	7
Bengals	0	6	7	0	13

at Paul Brown Stadium, Cincinnati

Coming off of their dominant home win over the Steelers, the Ravens flew to Paul Brown Stadium for an AFC North rematch with the Cincinnati Bengals, trying to win the division and a playoff berth on this Thursday Night fight. After a scoreless first quarter, the Ravens trailed early as Bengals kicker Shayne Graham kicked a 23-yard and a 27-yard field goal. In the third quarter, things went from bad to worse for Baltimore as QB Carson Palmer completed a 40-yard flea-flicker TD pass to WR T. J. Houshmandzadeh for the only score of the period. In the fourth quarter, the Ravens valiantly tried to fight back, as QB Steve McNair completed a 36-yard TD pass to WR Derrick Mason. However, a failed onside kick spelled Baltimore's doom. With the loss, the Ravens fell to 9–3.

==== Week 14: at Kansas City Chiefs ====
	1	2	3	4	Total
Ravens	3	3	7	7	20
Chiefs	0	0	3	7	10

at Arrowhead Stadium, Kansas City, Missouri

After a Thursday night loss at Cincinnati, the Ravens got an extra 3 days of rest before they traveled to Arrowhead Stadium in Kansas City, beating the Chiefs 20–10. This was Kansas City's first loss at home in December since the 1996 season when they fell victim to the Colts. Ravens quarterback Steve McNair threw for 283 yards and an 89-yard touchdown pass to receiver WR Mark Clayton, McNair's longest career touchdown pass. Other Baltimore scores included a 1-yard touchdown run by RB Jamal Lewis and two Matt Stover field goals. Chiefs quarterback Trent Green threw two interceptions, both to Baltimore safety Ed Reed, and one touchdown pass to Dante Hall. LB Terrell Suggs also forced a fumble, the 16th of his career making him the Ravens all-time leader in that stat. With this game, the Ravens improved to 10–3, sharing the second best record in the NFL, one game behind the San Diego Chargers. This would be the Ravens' first win against the Chiefs in franchise history.

==== Week 15: vs. Cleveland Browns ====
	1	2	3	4	Total
Browns	3	7	7	0	17
Ravens	7	10	7	3	27

at M&T Bank Stadium, Baltimore, Maryland

The Ravens beat Cleveland 27–17 in an AFC North Division match up. Baltimore's quarterback, Steve McNair, sustained an injury on his right throwing hand, and backup Kyle Boller came off the bench in the first quarter. Boller showed flashes of excellence at times, throwing two vital touchdown passes and setting up a Matt Stover field goal. Jamal Lewis also had a rushing touchdown. The Baltimore Ravens improved to an 11–3 record, clinching their first playoff appearance since the 2003 season. In addition, with a Cincinnati loss on Monday Night Football, the Ravens clinched the AFC North Division Title.

==== Week 16: vs. Pittsburgh Steelers ====
	1	2	3	4	Total
Ravens	7	7	7	10	31
Steelers	0	7	0	0	7

at Heinz Field, Pittsburgh, Pennsylvania

The Ravens beat the Pittsburgh Steelers 31–7 for the second time this season. and improved to a 12–3 record, moving up to the #2 AFC playoff seed with a Colts loss during Week 16 against the Texans. The Ravens defense held Pittsburgh RB Willie Parker to just thirty yards rushing and sacked Ben Roethlisberger five times. On offense Steve McNair threw three TD passes and was 21/31 for 256 yards with 2 interceptions. RB Jamal Lewis added 77 yards and a touchdown, and Matt Stover delivered a 26-yd field goal. This was the Ravens first win at Heinz Field since 2001. It was also the first time the Baltimore Ravens swept the season series against the Steelers in franchise history. The Ravens also tied their franchise record for wins in a season at 12 while improving to 12–3. They had last won 12 games during the 2000 season, after which they went on to win Super Bowl XXXV in Tampa.

==== Week 17: vs. Buffalo Bills ====
	1	2	3	4	Total
Bills	0	0	7	0	7
Ravens	3	3	10	3	19

at M&T Bank Stadium, Baltimore, Maryland

The Ravens beat the Buffalo Bills to end the season with a 13–3 record, clinch the #2 AFC playoff seed and clinch the first-round bye. Matt Stover kicked a 26-yard FG in the 1st quarter, a 37-yard FG in the 2nd quarter, and a 39-yard FG in the 3rd quarter. The Ravens almost shut out Buffalo, but Lee Evans caught a 44-yard TD pass from J. P. Losman midway through the 3rd quarter. The Ravens came back by recording an interception and a 31-yard interception return and TD by Chris McAlister. The Ravens ended the game in the 4th quarter by a 28-yard FG by Matt Stover.

=== Postseason ===
==== AFC Divisional Playoffs: vs. Indianapolis Colts ====
	1	2	3	4	Total
Colts	6	3	3	3	15
Ravens	0	3	3	0	6

at M&T Bank Stadium, Baltimore, Maryland

Coming off their bye week, the second-seeded Ravens began their playoff hunt at home against the third-seeded Indianapolis Colts. In the first quarter, Baltimore trailed early with kicker Adam Vinatieri getting a 23-yard and a 42-yard field goal. In the second quarter, the Ravens managed to score as kicker Matt Stover nailed a 40-yard field goal, yet Vinatieri would respond with a 51-yard field goal. In the third quarter, the Colts improved on its small lead with Vinatieri getting a 48-yard field goal. In the fourth quarter, Baltimore would manage to get a 51-yard field goal, yet Vinatieri helped the Colts get the win with a 35-yard field goal.

QB Steve McNair was 18 of 29 for 173 yards with no touchdowns and two interceptions. Overall, the Ravens lost four turnovers during the game.

With the loss, Baltimore ended its season with an overall record of 13–4.
