= Fairfield, Alabama =

City in Alabama, United States

- City
- Seal
- Motto: "An Older City Moving in a New Direction"
- Location of Fairfield in Jefferson County, Alabama.
- Coordinates: 33°28′56″N 86°54′58″W
- Country: United States
- State: Alabama
- County: Jefferson

Government
  - Mayor: Eddie Penny

Area
  - Total: 3.46 sq mi (8.96 km^{2})
  - Land: 3.46 sq mi (8.96 km^{2})
  - Water: 0 sq mi (0.00 km^{2})
- Elevation: 666 ft (203 m)

Population (2020)
  - Total: 10,000
  - Density: 2,889.9/sq mi (1,115.79/km^{2})
- Time zone: UTC-6 (Central (CST))
  - Summer (DST): UTC-5 (CDT)
- ZIP code: 35064
- Area codes: 205 & 659
- FIPS code: 01-25120
- GNIS feature ID: 2403587
- Website: https://cityoffairfieldal.org/

Fairfield is a city in western Jefferson County, Alabama, United States. It is part of the Birmingham metropolitan area and is located southeast of Pleasant Grove. The population was 10,000 at the 2020 census. Fairfield is home to Miles College, a historically black college enrolling over 1,100 students.

== History ==
This city was founded in 1910 in which the featured speaker at the dedication ceremony was former President Theodore Roosevelt. It was originally named Corey, after the President of U.S. Steel Corporation. Corey departed U.S. Steel under a cloud of scandal, and the town's name was later changed to the city in which his successor as president lived, Fairfield, Connecticut. It was planned as a model city by the Tennessee Coal, Iron and Railroad Company to house workers in their new Fairfield Works plant, now owned by U.S. Steel, similar to its northeastern city of Ensley.

It was incorporated on January 1, 1919.

In May 2020, the city entered bankruptcy. Jefferson County had declared bankruptcy in 2011.

== Geography ==
According to the U.S. Census Bureau, the city has a total area of 3.5 square miles (9.1 km^{2}), all land.

== Demographics ==
Historical population
| Census | Pop. | Note | %± |
|---|---|---|---|
| 1920 | 5,003 | | — |
| 1930 | 11,059 | | 121.0% |
| 1940 | 11,703 | | 5.8% |
| 1950 | 13,177 | | 12.6% |
| 1960 | 15,816 | | 20.0% |
| 1970 | 14,369 | | −9.1% |
| 1980 | 13,040 | | −9.2% |
| 1990 | 12,200 | | −6.4% |
| 2000 | 12,381 | | 1.5% |
| 2010 | 11,117 | | −10.2% |
| 2020 | 10,000 | | −10.0% |
| 2025 (est.) | 9,483 | ▼ | −5.2% |
U.S. Decennial Census

=== Racial and ethnic composition ===
Fairfield city, Alabama – Racial and ethnic composition Note: the US Census treats Hispanic/Latino as an ethnic category. This table excludes Latinos from the racial categories and assigns them to a separate category. Hispanics/Latinos may be of any race.
| Race / Ethnicity (NH = Non-Hispanic) | Pop 1980 | Pop 1990 | Pop 2000 | Pop 2010 | Pop 2020 | % 1980 | % 1990 | % 2000 | % 2010 | % 2020 |
|---|---|---|---|---|---|---|---|---|---|---|
| White alone (NH) | 6,049 | 3,013 | 1,086 | 442 | 217 | 46.39% | 24.70% | 8.77% | 3.98% | 2.17% |
| Black or African American alone (NH) | 6,859 | 9,141 | 11,132 | 10,489 | 9,474 | 52.60% | 74.93% | 89.91% | 94.35% | 94.74% |
| Native American or Alaska Native alone (NH) | 0 | 6 | 6 | 3 | 7 | 0.00% | 0.05% | 0.05% | 0.03% | 0.07% |
| Asian alone (NH) | 46 | 15 | 19 | 1 | 8 | 0.35% | 0.12% | 0.15% | 0.01% | 0.08% |
| Native Hawaiian or Pacific Islander alone (NH) | x | x | 1 | 2 | 3 | x | x | 0.01% | 0.02% | 0.03% |
| Other race alone (NH) | 7 | 3 | 6 | 5 | 10 | 0.05% | 0.02% | 0.05% | 0.04% | 0.10% |
| Mixed race or Multiracial (NH) | x | x | 58 | 48 | 122 | x | x | 0.47% | 0.43% | 1.22% |
| Hispanic or Latino (any race) | 79 | 22 | 73 | 127 | 159 | 0.61% | 0.18% | 0.59% | 1.14% | 1.59% |
| Total | 13,040 | 12,200 | 12,381 | 11,117 | 10,000 | 100.00% | 100.00% | 100.00% | 100.00% | 100.00% |

=== 2020 census ===
As of the 2020 census, Fairfield had a population of 10,000, 3,843 households, and 2,532 families. The median age was 38.8 years. 21.7% of residents were under the age of 18 and 19.4% were 65 years of age or older. For every 100 females there were 81.1 males, and for every 100 females age 18 and over there were 75.1 males age 18 and over.

100.0% of residents lived in urban areas, while 0.0% lived in rural areas.

There were 3,843 households in Fairfield, of which 28.8% had children under the age of 18 living in them. Of all households, 25.7% were married-couple households, 20.3% were households with a male householder and no spouse or partner present, and 49.2% were households with a female householder and no spouse or partner present. About 32.9% of all households were made up of individuals and 13.9% had someone living alone who was 65 years of age or older.

There were 4,623 housing units, of which 16.9% were vacant. The homeowner vacancy rate was 2.3% and the rental vacancy rate was 14.2%.

=== 2010 census ===
At the 2010 census, there were 11,117 people, 4,229 households, and 2,738 families living in the city. The population density was 3,176.3 inhabitants per square mile (1,226.4/km^{2}). There were 4,935 housing units at an average density of 1,410 per square mile (536.4/,/km^{2}). The racial makeup of the city was 94.6% Black or African American, 4.2% White, 0.0% Native American, 0.0% Asian, 0.0% Pacific Islander, 0.7% from other races, and 0.4% from two or more races. 1.1% of the population were Hispanic or Latino of any race.

Of the 4,229 households 24.9% had children under the age of 18 living with them, 28.3% were married couples living together, 31.4% had a female householder with no husband present, and 35.3% were non-families. 32.7% of households were one person and 12.4% were one person aged 65 or older. The average household size was 2.45 and the average family size was 3.10.

The age distribution was 23.0% under the age of 18, 14.3% from 18 to 24, 20.7% from 25 to 44, 28.9% from 45 to 64, and 13.0% 65 or older. The median age was 36.8 years. For every 100 females, there were 79.0 males. For every 100 females age 18 and over, there were 81.1 males.

The median household income was $34,242 and the median family income was $41,841. Males had a median income of $34,854 versus $29,788 for females. The per capita income for the city was $18,221. About 22.2% of families and 24.2% of the population were below the poverty line, including 40.5% of those under age 18 and 21.7% of those age 65 or over.

=== 2000 census ===
At the 2000 census, there were 12,381 people, 4,600 households, and 3,141 families living in the city. The population density was 3,503.8 inhabitants per square mile (1,352.8/km^{2}). There were 4,960 housing units at an average density of 1,403.7 per square mile (542.0/km^{2}). The racial makeup of the city was 8.90% White, 90.23% Black or African American, 0.06% Native American, 0.15% Asian, 0.02% Pacific Islander, 0.17% from other races, and 0.48% from two or more races. 0.59% of the population were Hispanic or Latino of any race.

Of the 4,600 households 34.0% had children under the age of 18 living with them, 35.6% were married couples living together, 28.4% had a female householder with no husband present, and 31.7% were non-families. 29.2% of households were one person and 12.0% were one person aged 65 or older. The average household size was 2.55 and the average family size was 3.17.

The age distribution was 26.7% under the age of 18, 11.9% from 18 to 24, 25.2% from 25 to 44, 22.3% from 45 to 64, and 13.8% 65 or older. The median age was 36 years. For every 100 females, there were 79.2 males. For every 100 females age 18 and over, there were 73.4 males.

The median household income was $27,845 and the median family income was $38,552. Males had a median income of $30,833 versus $25,143 for females. The per capita income for the city was $14,607. About 16.5% of families and 21.5% of the population were below the poverty line, including 27.7% of those under age 18 and 25.3% of those age 65 or over.

== Education ==
Fairfield has its own school system, independent from Jefferson County Schools. Fairfield City Schools includes three elementary schools, Forest Hills Middle School, Fairfield High Preparatory School (formerly Fairfield High School), and an alternative all-grades school.

The city is also home to Miles College, a historically black college operated by the CME Church. The school was founded in 1898.

== Industry and business ==
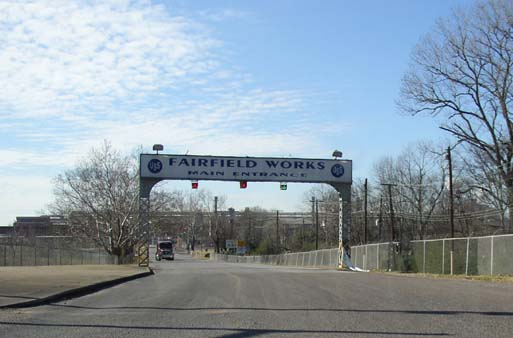
Main entrance to the U.S. Steel Fairfield Works

Though the United States' steel-making industry has gone through a decline through the last half of the 20th century, U.S. Steel's Fairfield Works continues to be a major employer, though not in the levels seen around the 1950s. Advances in steel-making technology have enabled the works to produce roughly the same amount of product as during that era, but with a much smaller workforce.

Portions of the works have been closed over the years, but many parts of the complex have been reopened by smaller industries, some of which are steel-related.

Fairfield is traversed by I-20/I-59. Three railroads serve the area: CSX Transportation (former Louisville and Nashville Railroad), Norfolk Southern Railway (former Southern Railway), and short-line Birmingham Southern Railroad, which is headquartered in Fairfield.

The city's downtown area features a number of small businesses, primarily service-related. Other retail businesses are concentrated along Aronov Drive, northwest of Western Hills Mall, though those strip malls have declined due to closures of Kmart, Winn-Dixie, and Sears locations. Walmart shut its doors in early 2016. All public bus transportation was terminated in July 2016 for failure to pay the bill. The water board has threatened to cut off all water to public buildings because of non payment. On May 20, 2020, the city of Fairfield filed for bankruptcy.

=== Western Hills Mall ===
Western Hills Mall is the city's major shopping mall.

== Notable people ==
- U. W. Clemon, federal judge who was born in Fairfield.
- Red Cochran and Jim Tolbert, former NFL players were born in Fairfield.
- Oliver W. Dillard, Major General US Army Retired, graduated from the Fairfield Industrial High School
- Cleveland Eaton, Jazz musician with the Count Basie Orchestra was born in Fairfield.
- Dennis Edwards, singer with The Temptations, was born in Fairfield.
- Walter Gilbert, member of the College Football Hall of Fame.
- Tim Johnson, former professional football linebacker.
- Doug Jones, lawyer, United States Attorney and Senator. Born in Fairfield.
- Larry Langford, former Fairfield mayor and mayor of Birmingham resided in Fairfield.
- George Lindsey, actor in The Andy Griffith Show) was born in Fairfield.
- James MacKay, Georgia congressman, born in Fairfield.
- Spider Martin, photographer was born in Fairfield.
- Willie Mays, attended school in Fairfield played baseball, football, and basketball.
- Demetrius Newton, civil rights lawyer and member of the Alabama House of Representatives.
- Allene Roberts, actress, The Red House, born in Fairfield.
