= Sam Koch =

American football player and coach (born 1982)

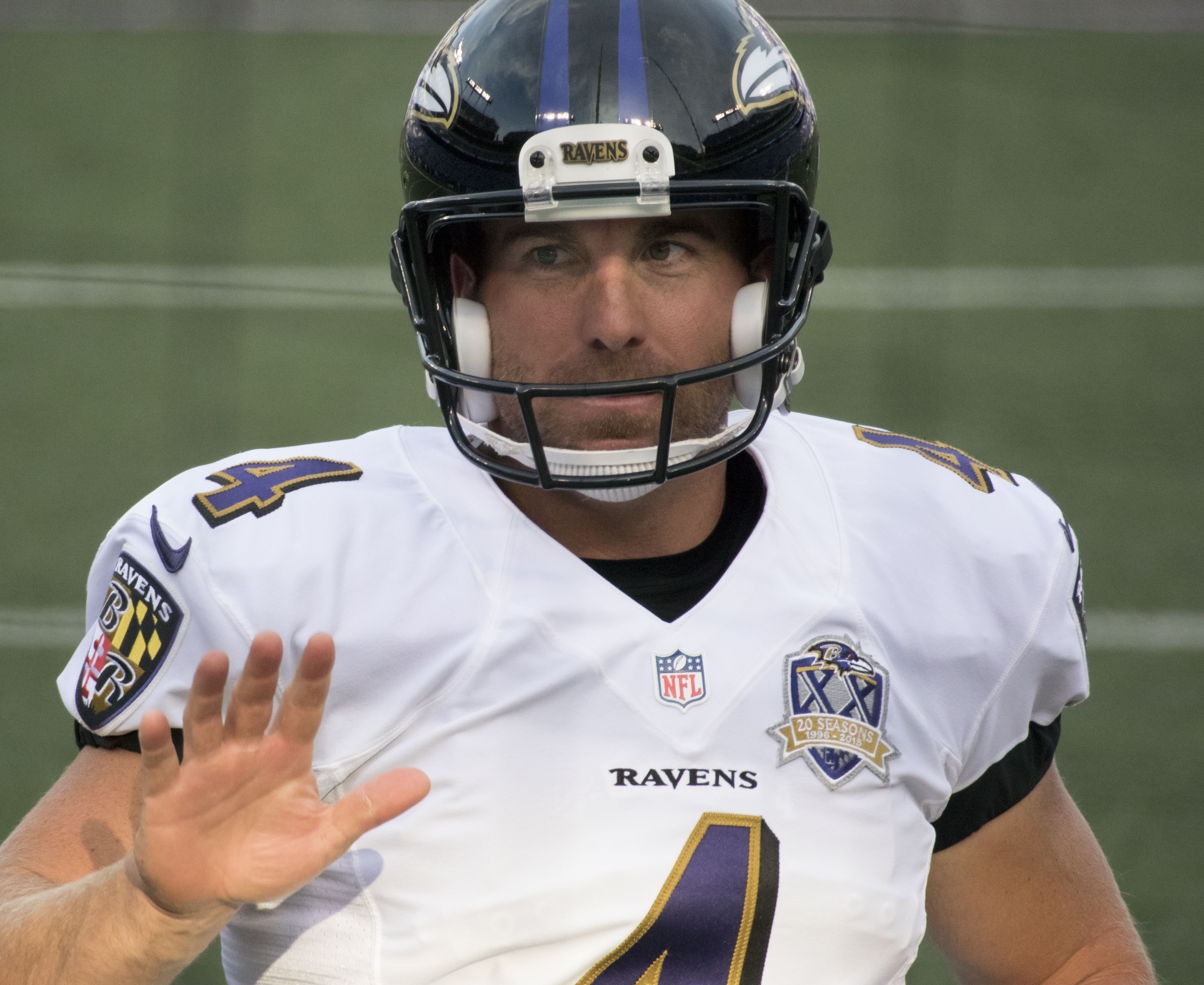
- Koch with the Baltimore Ravens in 2015

Profile
- Position: Punter

Personal information
- Born: August 13, 1982 (age 44); York, Nebraska, U.S.
- Listed height: 6 ft 1 in (1.85 m)
- Listed weight: 222 lb (101 kg)

Career information
- High school: Seward (Seward, Nebraska)
- College: Nebraska (2002–2005)
- NFL draft: 2006: 6th round, 203rd overall pick

Career history

Playing
- Baltimore Ravens (2006–2021)

Coaching
- Baltimore Ravens (2022–2024) Special teams consultant

Awards and highlights
- Super Bowl champion (XLVII); Second-team All-Pro (2015); Pro Bowl (2015)

Career NFL statistics
- Punts: 1,168
- Punting yards: 52,868
- Average punt: 45.3
- Longest punt: 74 yards
- Inside 20: 453
- Stats at Pro Football Reference

Samuel David Koch (/kʊk/ KUUK; born August 13, 1982) is an American former professional football player. He played his 16-year career as a punter for the Baltimore Ravens of the National Football League (NFL). He played college football for the Nebraska Cornhuskers and was selected by the Ravens in the sixth round of the 2006 NFL draft. He is known for developing many punting variations, revolutionizing his position in the process.

== Early life ==
Koch attended Seward High School in Seward, Nebraska and played punter, kicker, tight end, offensive lineman, fullback, and linebacker for Coach Greg Welch and the football team. Along with football, Koch played basketball, baseball, and soccer.

== College career ==
Koch walked on to the Nebraska football team, where he played punter, and later would receive a scholarship before the start of the 2004 season. He did not see game action as a redshirt freshman in 2002, but served as the backup punter. As a sophomore in 2003, he backed up Kyle Larson at punter, but did not attempt a punt. Koch was Nebraska’s punter from 2004–05 after holding kickoff duties for 7 games in 2003. He was named to the 2005 2nd-team Academic All-Big 12 squad and the 2005 Big 12 Commissioner’s Spring and Fall Academic Honor Roll. He racked up a career-punting average of 44.1 yards (with 56 kicks inside the 20 and a long of 84 yards). As a senior, Koch put together the best campaign ever at his position in school history, as he broke the single-season punting average mark with a 46.5-yard average in 2005. The 2005 average bested the previous record of 45.1 yards per punt by former Bengals punter Kyle Larson in 2003. Koch’s average ranked second nationally and helped Nebraska to a No. 2 national ranking in net punting (39.9 avg.) As a senior, he was a semifinalist for the Ray Guy Award. In his collegiate finale in the 2005 Alamo Bowl, Koch posted a 51.5-yard average on 8 punts against Michigan, including 5 punts over 50 yards each. He connected on at least 1 punt of 50 yards or more in 8 of 11 contests and surpassed the 48-yard barrier in every single game. He was the Huskers’ kickoff specialist for the 2nd half of the season and 18 of his 32 kickoffs resulted in touchbacks. In his final 6 games, opponents had just 10 returns totaling 165 yards. In December 2005, he earned a degree in business administration.

== Professional career ==
Pre-draft measurables
| Height | Weight |
|---|---|
| 6 ft 1 1/8 in (1.86 m) | 233 lb (106 kg) |
All values from Pro Day

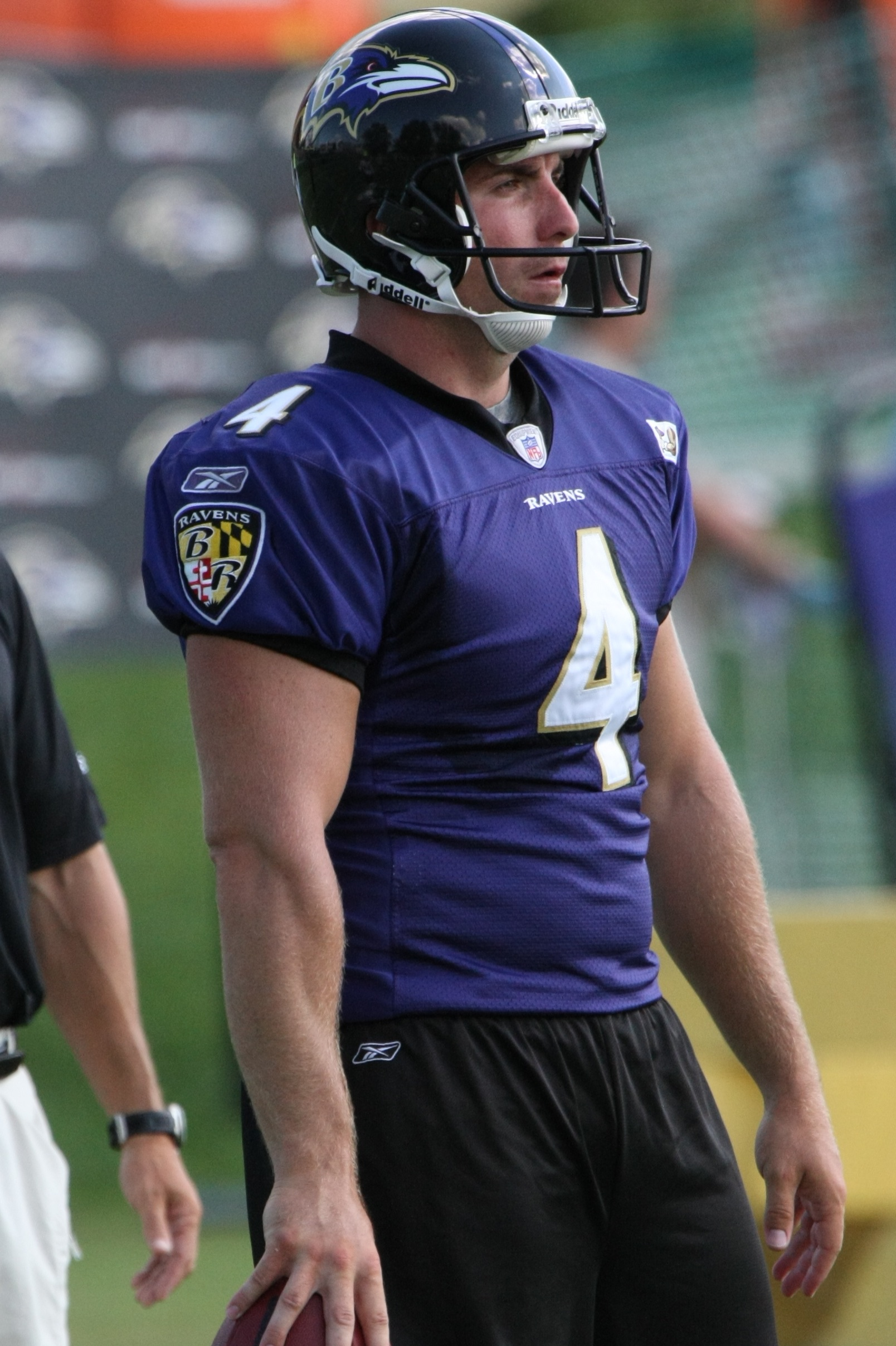
Koch at training camp in 2009

Koch was selected by the Baltimore Ravens in the sixth round (203rd overall) of the 2006 NFL draft. In his rookie season, he played in all 16 regular season games, punting 86 times for 3,695 yards and placing 30 of those inside the 20 which ranked fourth in the NFL. He made his NFL debut at the Tampa Bay Buccaneers on September 10.

In the 2007 season, Koch finished with 78 punts for 3,397 net yards for a 43.55 average.

In the 2008 season, Koch led the NFL in punts inside the 10 yard line. In Week 16, against the Dallas Cowboys, he completed his first career professional pass for nine yards. Overall, on the season, he totaled 84 punts for 3,777 net yards for a 44.96 average.

In the 2009 season, Koch finished with 73 punts for 3,188 net yards for a 43.67 average.

A restricted free agent in the 2009 offseason, Koch signed his one-year, $1.545 million tender offer on March 27.

In the 2010 season, Koch finished with 82 punts for 3,530 net yards for a 43.05 average. In addition, he completed a 13-yard pass in a game against the Miami Dolphins.

After an outstanding 2010 season, Koch was named to the 2010 All-Fundamentals Team by USA Football and the NFL Players Association.

In the 2011 season, Koch finished with 73 punts for 3,393 net yards for a 46.48 average.

During the 2012 season, Koch scored his first touchdown on a fake field goal in a Week 10 55–20 win over the Oakland Raiders on November 11, 2012. Koch was the holder on the play. Overall, he finished the 2012 season with 83 punts for 3,911 yards for a 47.42 average. Koch got his first championship title as the Ravens won against the 49ers in Super Bowl XLVII. Koch made key contributions on the final two plays of the Super Bowl, first scrambling in his own end zone to burn time off the clock before taking an elective safety with four seconds remaining. On the next play, he converted a 60-yard free-kick which left the 49ers well outside field goal range and allowed the clock to run out after the ball was fielded.

In the 2013 season, Koch finished with 90 punts for 4,138 net yards for a 45.98 average.

In the 2014 season, Koch finished with 60 punts for 2,841 yards for a 47.35 average.

On July 9, 2015, Koch was re-signed by the Ravens on a five-year, $16.25 million contract, making him one of the highest paid punters in the NFL. Overall, in the 2015 season, he finished with 74 punts for 3,454 net yards for a 46.68 average.

In Week 12 of the 2016 season, against the Cincinnati Bengals, Koch was involved in a strategic maneuver similar to his Super Bowl XLVII play at the end of the game. With the Ravens leading 19–12 with 11 seconds remaining in the game on their own 23-yard line, Koch fielded the ball and ran back 23 yards to his own endzone to take an intentional safety and run the clock out. The play was a success and the Ravens won 19–14. Overall, in the 2016 season, he finished with 80 punts for 3,665 net yards for a 45.81 average.

In Week 12 of the 2017 season, Koch completed a 22-yard pass to Chris Moore on a fake punt play, earning him AFC Special Teams Player of the Week. In Week 15, Koch punted five times for an average over 43 yards, with four punts landing inside the 20-yard line, earning him his second AFC Special Teams Player of the Week this season. Overall, in the 2017 season, he finished with 84 punts for 3,765 net yards for a 44.82 average.

In the 2018 season, Koch had 60 total punts for 2,842 net yards for a 47.37 average, which ranked fourth in the league.

In the 2019 season, Koch had 40 total punts for 1,855 net yards for a 46.38 average.

On March 18, 2020, Koch signed a two-year contract extension with the Ravens through the 2022 season. He was placed on the reserve/COVID-19 list by the team on December 30, 2020, and activated on January 9, 2021.

On September 26, 2021, Koch was the holder for placekicker Justin Tucker when the latter broke the NFL record for the longest field goal in history, kicking a 66-yard field goal as time expired to beat the Detroit Lions 19–17.

As a passer, Koch was completed seven of eight pass attempts for 82 yards in his NFL career.

On May 19, 2022, Koch announced his retirement from football, spending all his 16 years with the Ravens.

== Coaching career ==
Koch (second from right) and other Ravens players at Fort Meade, 2026

After retiring as a player, Koch joined the Ravens staff as a special teams consultant. In May 2025, The New York Times reported that Koch was no longer with the Ravens, having departed during the 2024 offseason and before Justin Tucker, with whom Koch was close, was released.

== Career statistics ==
=== NFL ===
Legend
| | Won the Super Bowl |
| **Bold** | Career high |

| Year | Team | GP | Punting | | | | | Off. | Def. |
| Year | Team | GP | Punts | Yds | Avg | Lng | Blk | Yds | Cmb |
|---|---|---|---|---|---|---|---|---|---|
| 2006 | BAL | 16 | 86 | 3,695 | 43.0 | 61 | 0 | 0 | **2** |
| 2007 | BAL | 16 | 78 | 3,397 | 43.6 | 64 | **1** | 0 | **2** |
| 2008 | BAL | 16 | 84 | 3,777 | 45.0 | **74** | 0 | 9 | **2** |
| 2009 | BAL | 16 | 73 | 3,188 | 43.7 | 60 | **1** | 0 | 0 |
| 2010 | BAL | 16 | 81 | 3,530 | 43.6 | 60 | 0 | 13 | 1 |
| 2011 | BAL | 16 | 73 | 3,393 | 46.5 | 63 | 0 | 0 | 1 |
| 2012 | BAL | 16 | 83 | 3,911 | 47.1 | 60 | 0 | 17 | **2** |
| 2013 | BAL | 16 | **90** | **4,138** | 46.0 | 69 | **1** | 0 | 1 |
| 2014 | BAL | 16 | 60 | 2,841 | **47.4** | 73 | **1** | 0 | 0 |
| 2015 | BAL | 16 | 74 | 3,454 | 46.7 | 67 | 0 | 7 | 1 |
| 2016 | BAL | 16 | 80 | 3,665 | 45.8 | 68 | 0 | −23 | 1 |
| 2017 | BAL | 16 | 84 | 3,765 | 44.8 | 67 | **1** | **38** | 0 |
| 2018 | BAL | 16 | 60 | 2,842 | **47.4** | 65 | **1** | 21 | 1 |
| 2019 | BAL | 16 | 40 | 1,855 | 46.4 | 62 | **1** | −2 | **2** |
| 2020 | BAL | 15 | 51 | 2,268 | 44.5 | 59 | 0 | 15 | 0 |
| 2021 | BAL | **17** | 71 | 3,149 | 44.4 | 61 | 0 | 0 | 1 |
| Career | | 256 | 1,168 | 52,868 | 45.3 | 74 | 7 | 92 | 17 |

=== College ===
| **Year** | **School** | **Conf** | **Class** | **Pos** | **G** | **Punts** | **Yds** | **Avg** |
| 2004 | Nebraska | Big 12 | JR | P | 11 | 63 | 2,600 | 41.3 |
| 2005 | Nebraska | Big 12 | SR | P | 12 | 71 | 3,302 | 46.5 |
| **Career** | **Nebraska** | | | | | **134** | **5,902** | **44.0** |

== Career highlights ==
=== Awards and honors ===
- Super Bowl champion (XLVII)
- Second-team All-Pro (2015)
- Pro Bowl (2015)

=== Ravens franchise records ===
- Most career punt yards: 52,868 yards
- Longest career punt: 74 yards (tied with Jordan Stout)
- Highest career yards per punt average: 45.3 yards
- Most games played: 256 games
