= Daniel J. Reynolds =

American judge (1934–2019)

Daniel J. Reynolds, Jr. (1944 – December 26, 2019), was a Circuit Judge of the 10th Judicial Circuit (Bessemer Division) in Jefferson County, Alabama. Born in 1944, he died on December 26, 2019. He was a member of the Alabama Democratic Party. He served as District Attorney of the Bessemer Division from 1973-1979. He then became a Circuit Judge serving from (1979-1997) when he retired from elective office. He then served in the private practice of law until his retirement in 2011.

== Education ==
Reynolds was a graduate of Fairfield High School in Fairfield, Alabama. He received both his undergraduate and law degree from the University of Alabama

== Personal life ==
He was married to Katha (Holston) Reynolds with whom he had three children. He served in the U.S. Army with the 101st Airborne Division during The Vietnam War. He was also a member of Pleasant Hill United Methodist Church in McCalla, Alabama.
