= Fairfield City Schools =

School district in Alabama, United States

Fairfield City Schools is an independent municipal school district in Jefferson County, Alabama. It is governed by the Fairfield Board of Education. The Board is responsible for the following:

- C. J. Donald Elementary School
- Glen Oaks Elementary School
- Robinson Elementary School
- Forest Hills Community Development Center
- Fairfield High Preparatory School

== Failing schools ==
Statewide testing ranks the schools in Alabama. Those in the bottom six percent are listed as "failing." As of early 2018, two of the seven local schools were included in this category:

- Fairfield High Preparatory School
- Glen Oaks elementary school
