= Malabar (typeface) =

Serif typeface

Malabar is a serif typeface designed by Daniel John Andrew Reynolds in 2008, and released by Linotype GmbH, now a subsidiary of Monotype Corporation.

Malabar was a gold winner of the German Design Award 2010.

Malabar is an optional font on most Nook and Kobo e-readers.
