= Ronnie Prude =

American football player (born 1982)

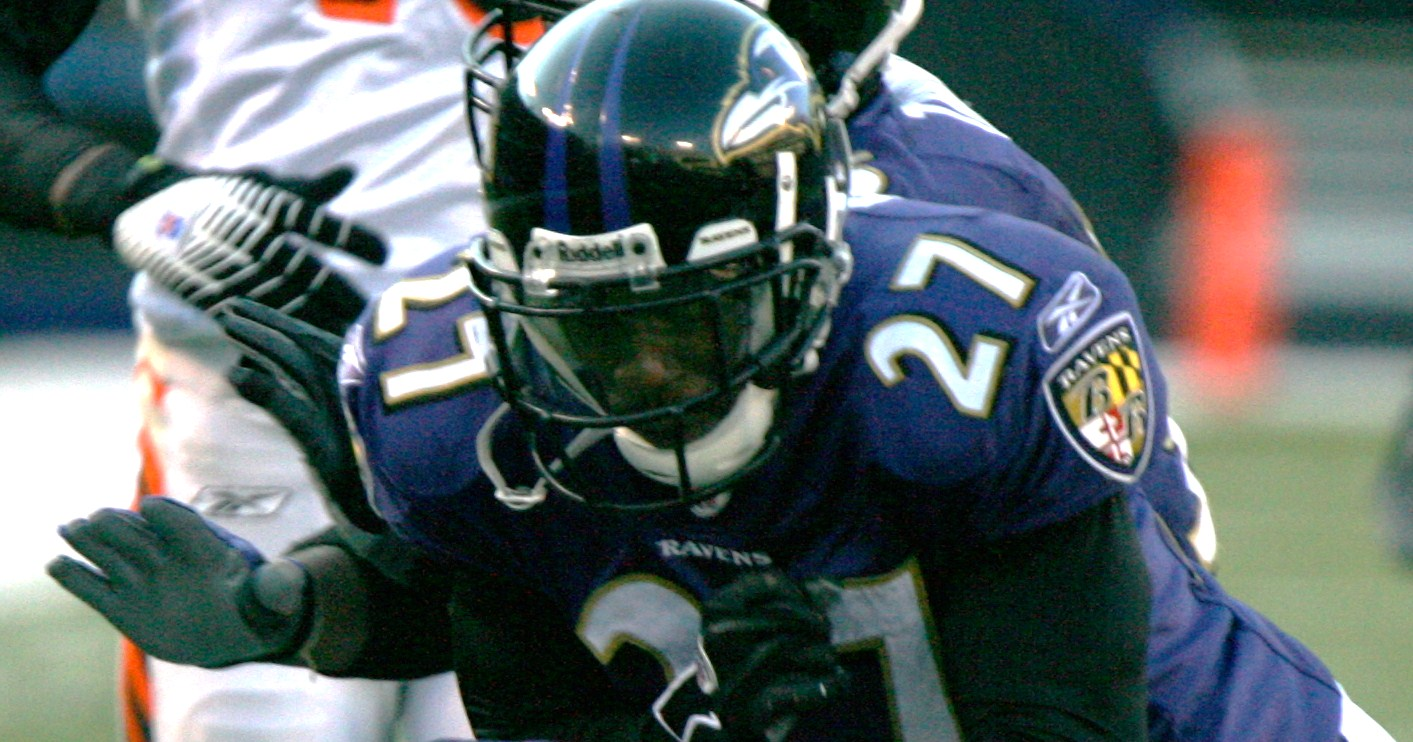
- Prude playing against the Cincinnati Bengals in 2006

No. 27, 21
- Position: Cornerback

Personal information
- Born: June 4, 1982 (age 44); Shreveport, Louisiana, U.S.
- Listed height: 5 ft 11 in (1.80 m)
- Listed weight: 190 lb (86 kg)

Career information
- High school: Fair Park (Shreveport)
- College: LSU
- NFL draft: 2006: undrafted

Career history
- Baltimore Ravens (2006–2007); Atlanta Falcons (2009)*; Sacramento Mountain Lions (2009–2011); Edmonton Eskimos (2012)
- * Offseason or practice squad member only

Awards and highlights
- BCS national champion (2003)

Career NFL statistics
- Total tackles: 22
- Pass deflections: 8
- Interceptions: 2
- Defensive touchdowns: 1
- Stats at Pro Football Reference

Ronnie Edward Prude Jr. (born June 4, 1982) is an American former professional football player who was a cornerback in the National Football League (NFL) and Canadian Football League (CFL). He played college football for the LSU Tigers and was signed by the Baltimore Ravens as an undrafted free agent in 2006.

Prude was also a member of the Atlanta Falcons, Sacramento Mountain Lions, and Edmonton Eskimos.

== College career ==
Prude played college football for the LSU Tigers. During his career he played in 52 games making 114 tackles and three interceptions. He earned a degree in communications.

== Professional career ==
=== Baltimore Ravens ===
Prude was signed by the Baltimore Ravens as a rookie free agent on May 12, 2006. In his rookie season he played in 15 games and made nine tackles he also recorded two interceptions in 2006, returning one interception against the Saints back for a touchdown. The following year, he made 13 tackles.

An exclusive-rights free agent in the 2008 offseason, Prude signed his one-year tender offer on April 23. He was waived during final cuts on August 30.

=== Atlanta Falcons ===
After spending the 2008 season out of football, Prude was signed by the Atlanta Falcons on January 7, 2009. He was waived on May 15.

=== California Redwoods ===
Prude was signed by the California Redwoods of the United Football League on August 18, 2009.

=== Edmonton Eskimos ===
On March 30, 2012, Prude signed with the Edmonton Eskimos of the Canadian Football League. On August 10, 2012, Prude suffered a neck injury and had to be taken off the field by stretcher after lying motionless for a few minutes after trying to tackle former Saskatchewan Roughrider Terence Jeffers-Harris. He was released by the Eskimos on April 18, 2013.

== Personal life ==
Prude is a cousin of former Minnesota Vikings wide receiver Anthony Carter and former Dallas Cowboys cornerback Morris Claiborne.
