= Fairfield High Preparatory School =

Coordinates: 33°29′26.65″N 86°54′29.51″W

Location
- 610 Valley Road; Fairfield, Alabama 35064; United States

Information
- Type: Public
- Motto: Our capabilities are endless
- Established: 1928 (98 years ago)
- School district: Fairfield City Schools
- CEEB code: 011055
- Principal: Timothy Perry
- Faculty: 55
- Grades: 9-12
- Enrollment: 480 (2023-2024)
- Student to teacher ratio: 21:1
- Campus type: Suburban
- Colors: Purple, gold, maroon, and white
- Athletics: AHSAA Class 5A
- Nickname: Tigers
- Feeder schools: C J Donald Middle School
- Website: www.fairfieldschoolsystem.com/o/fhps

Fairfield High Preparatory School is a public high school located in Fairfield, Alabama, United States, a suburb of Birmingham, and serves grades 9–12. It is the only high school in the Fairfield City School System. School colors are purple, gold, maroon, and white. The athletic teams are called the Tigers. Fairfield competes in AHSAA Class 5A athletics.

Fairfield High Preparatory School, historically known as Fairfield High School, was established in 1928 to serve white students living in the Fairfield area. A second high school, Fairfield Industrial High School, was established for African-American students. Fairfield High School was integrated in 1969.

== Student profile ==
Enrollment in grades 9-12 for the 2013-14 school year is 576 students. Approximately 99% of students are African-American and 1% are white. Roughly 82% of students qualify for free or reduced price lunch.

Fairfield has a graduation rate of 62%. Approximately 67% of its students meet or exceed state proficiency standards in both mathematics and reading. The average ACT score for Fairfield students is 20, and the average SAT score is 1550.

== Athletics ==
Fairfield competes in AHSAA Class 5A athletics and fields teams in the following sports:

- Baseball
- Basketball
- Cheerleading
- Flag Football
- Football
- Softball
- Volleyball
- Track
- Band

Fairfield has won a total of six ASHAA championships in boys basketball (2020), girls basketball (2010), boys' track and field (1956), and wrestling (1967, 1968, 1969).

The Fairfield Tigers football team fielded its first squad in 1923. Through the 2019 season they have amassed a won/loss record of 491-431-26 on the gridiron. The Tigers football team have won Region titles in 1974, 1975, 1976, 1977, 2004 and 2005. The team won its most lopsided game in 1926 when they defeated Leeds High School by a margin of 72-0. The Tigers have played the McAdory High School Yellowjackets 58 times, more than any other opponent. Fairfield leads the series with an overall winning record of 33-24-1.

== Notable alumni ==
- DeWanna Bonner, 2x WNBA Champion, 6x WNBA All-Star
- Doug Jones, former United States Senator from Alabama (2018-2021), former United States Attorney for the Northern District of Alabama (1997-2001)
- Willie Mays, MLB Hall of Famer
- Keith McKeller, former NFL tight end for the Buffalo Bills
- Daniel J. Reynolds, Circuit Judge-Alabama 10th Judicial Circuit, Bessemer Division
- Jim Tolbert, former NFL and AFL player from 1966 through 1976.
