= 2006 Oregon Ducks football team =

American college football season

2006 Oregon Ducks football

Las Vegas Bowl, L 8–38 vs BYU
- Conference: Pacific-10 Conference
- Record: 7–6 (4–5 Pac-10)
- Head coach: Mike Bellotti (12th season)
- Offensive coordinator: Gary Crowton (2nd season)
- Offensive scheme: Spread
- Defensive coordinator: Nick Aliotti (10th season)
- Base defense: 4–3
- Captain: Game captains
- Home stadium: Autzen Stadium

Uniform

2006 Pacific-10 Conference football standings
| | Conf. | | | Overall |
| Team | W | | L | W | | L |
|---|---|---|---|---|---|---|
| No. 4 USC + | 7 | – | 2 | 11 | – | 2 |
| No. 14 California + | 7 | – | 2 | 10 | – | 3 |
| No. 21 Oregon State | 6 | – | 3 | 10 | – | 4 |
| UCLA | 5 | – | 4 | 7 | – | 6 |
| Arizona State | 4 | – | 5 | 7 | – | 6 |
| Oregon | 4 | – | 5 | 7 | – | 6 |
| Arizona | 4 | – | 5 | 6 | – | 6 |
| Washington State | 4 | – | 5 | 6 | – | 6 |
| Washington | 3 | – | 6 | 5 | – | 7 |
| Stanford | 1 | – | 8 | 1 | – | 11 |
+ – Conference co-champions; Rankings from AP Poll

The 2006 Oregon Ducks football team represented the University of Oregon as a member of the Pacific-10 Conference (Pac-10) during the 2006 NCAA Division I FBS football season. Led by 12th-year head coach Mike Bellotti, the Ducks compiled an overall record of 7–6 with a mark of 5–4 in conference play, placing fourth in the Pac-10. Oregon was invited to the Las Vegas Bowl, where the Ducks lost to BYU. The team played home games at Autzen Stadium in Eugene, Oregon.

The Ducks began the season ranked 21st in the AP Poll, and won their first game against Stanford by a score of 48–10. Dennis Dixon was the quarterback for the Ducks during the season with Jonathan Stewart as the primary running back.

== Before the season ==
=== Recruiting ===
College recruiting
| Name | Hometown | School | Height | Weight | 40^{‡} | Commit date |
|---|---|---|---|---|---|---|
| Fenuki Tupou; OL | Rocklin, CA | Sierra CC | 6 ft 6 in (1.98 m) | 328 lb (149 kg) | 5.1 | Dec 14, 2005 |
| Fenuki Tupou; OL | Recruit ratings: Scout: Rivals: (–) | | | | | |
| Matthew Harper; S | San Francisco, CA | CC of San Francisco | 6 ft 0 in (1.83 m) | 183 lb (83 kg) | 4.5 | Dec 20, 2005 |
| Matthew Harper; S | Recruit ratings: Scout: Rivals: (–) | | | | | |
| Cody Kempt; QB | Portland, OR | Westview HS | 6 ft 3 in (1.91 m) | 205 lb (93 kg) | 4.6 | Nov 6, 2005 |
| Cody Kempt; QB | Recruit ratings: Scout: Rivals: (77) | | | | | |
| Justin Roper; QB | Buford, GA | Buford HS | 6 ft 7 in (2.01 m) | 198 lb (90 kg) | 4.9 | Dec 18, 2005 |
| Justin Roper; QB | Recruit ratings: Scout: Rivals: (76) | | | | | |
| Nathan Costa; QB | Hilmar, CA | Hilmar HS | 6 ft 1 in (1.85 m) | 195 lb (88 kg) | 4.7 | Aug 4, 2005 |
| Nathan Costa; QB | Recruit ratings: Scout: Rivals: (70) | | | | | |
| Andre Crenshaw; RB | Lancaster, CA | Antelope Valley HS | 5 ft 10 in (1.78 m) | 178 lb (81 kg) | 4.4 | Jan 31, 2005 |
| Andre Crenshaw; RB | Recruit ratings: Scout: Rivals: (40) | | | | | |
| Marvin Johnson; CB | Compton, CA | Dominguez HS | 5 ft 10 in (1.78 m) | 185 lb (84 kg) | 4.7 | Jan 2, 2006 |
| Marvin Johnson; CB | Recruit ratings: Scout: Rivals: (40) | | | | | |
| Bo Thran; OL | Gresham, OR | Sam Barlow HS | 6 ft 5 in (1.96 m) | 273 lb (124 kg) | 5.1 | Jan 23, 2006 |
| Bo Thran; OL | Recruit ratings: Scout: Rivals: (40) | | | | | |
| Jameel Dowling; S | Oroville, CA | Butte CC | 6 ft 4 in (1.93 m) | 193 lb (88 kg) | 4.5 | Dec 3, 2006 |
| Jameel Dowling; S | Recruit ratings: Scout: Rivals: (–) | | | | | |
| Jeremy Gibbs; DT | Miami, OK | Northeastern Oklahoma A&M | 6 ft 4 in (1.93 m) | 285 lb (129 kg) | 4.8 | Jan 18, 2006 |
| Jeremy Gibbs; DT | Recruit ratings: Scout: Rivals: (–) | | | | | |
| Micah Howeth; DE | Miami, OK | Northeastern Oklahoma A&M | 6 ft 2 in (1.88 m) | 245 lb (111 kg) | 4.7 | Sep 19, 2005 |
| Micah Howeth; DE | Recruit ratings: Scout: Rivals: (–) | | | | | |
| Dexter Manley; DE | Santa Monica, CA | Santa Monica CC | 6 ft 4 in (1.93 m) | 260 lb (120 kg) | 4.5 | Jan 15, 2006 |
| Dexter Manley; DE | Recruit ratings: Scout: Rivals: (–) | | | | | |
| Remene Alston; RB | Greensboro, NC | Page HS | 5 ft 9 in (1.75 m) | 182 lb (83 kg) | 4.4 | Jan 18, 2006 |
| Remene Alston; RB | Recruit ratings: Scout: Rivals: (70) | | | | | |
| Jordan Holmes; OG | Yuba City, CA | Yuba City HS | 6 ft 4 in (1.93 m) | 278 lb (126 kg) | NA | Nov 16, 2005 |
| Jordan Holmes; OG | Recruit ratings: Scout: Rivals: (40) | | | | | |
| C.E. Kaiser; OL | Veradale, WA | Central Valley HS | 6 ft 5 in (1.96 m) | 262 lb (119 kg) | NA | Nov 9, 2005 |
| C.E. Kaiser; OL | Recruit ratings: Scout: Rivals: (40) | | | | | |
| Jovan Sanford Wesley; S | San Diego, CA | Mission Bay HS | 5 ft 10 in (1.78 m) | 180 lb (82 kg) | 4.4 | Dec 14, 2005 |
| Jovan Sanford Wesley; S | Recruit ratings: Scout: Rivals: (40) | | | | | |
| Spencer Paysinger; WR | Beverly Hills, CA | Beverly Hills HS | 6 ft 3 in (1.91 m) | 208 lb (94 kg) | 4.4 | Jan 26, 2006 |
| Spencer Paysinger; WR | Recruit ratings: Scout: Rivals: (40) | | | | | |
| Chad Peppars; CB | Los Angeles, CA | Loyola HS | 5 ft 11 in (1.80 m) | 176 lb (80 kg) | 4.5 | Dec 13, 2005 |
| Chad Peppars; CB | Recruit ratings: Scout: Rivals: (40) | | | | | |
| Antwaun Harris; WR | Garland, TX | S. Garland HS | 6 ft 0 in (1.83 m) | 193 lb (88 kg) | 4.4 | Feb 1, 2006 |
| Antwaun Harris; WR | Recruit ratings: Scout: Rivals: (NA) | | | | | |
| Pat So'oalo; OL | Fresno, CA | Fresno City CC | 6 ft 5 in (1.96 m) | 305 lb (138 kg) | NA | Dec 15, 2005 |
| Pat So'oalo; OL | Recruit ratings: Scout: Rivals: (–) | | | | | |
| Brandon Bair; TE | St. Anthony, ID | South Fremont HS | 6 ft 7 in (2.01 m) | 238 lb (108 kg) | NA | Feb 1, 2006 |
| Brandon Bair; TE | Recruit ratings: Scout: Rivals: (40) | | | | | |
Overall recruit ranking: Scout: 52 Rivals: 49
‡ Refers to 40-yard dash; Note: In many cases, Scout, Rivals, 247Sports, On3, and ESPN may conflict in their listings of height, weight and 40 time.; In these cases, the average was taken. ESPN grades are on a 100-point scale.; Sources: "Oregon Football Commitment List 2006". Rivals.; "Oregon College Football Recruiting Commits 2006". Scout.; "Oregon Ducks Commits 2006". ESPN.; "Scout.com Team Recruiting Rankings". Scout.; "2006 Team Ranking". Rivals.com.

== Schedule ==
| Date | Time | Opponent | Rank | Site | TV | Result | Attendance | Source |
|---|---|---|---|---|---|---|---|---|
| September 2 | 12:30 pm | Stanford | No. 21 | Autzen Stadium; Eugene, OR (rivalry) | ABC | W 48–10 | 58,450 | |
| September 9 | 7:00 pm | at Fresno State* | No. 20 | Bulldog Stadium; Fresno, CA | ESPN2 | W 31–24 | 42,281 | |
| September 16 | 12:30 pm | No. 11 Oklahoma* | No. 18 | Autzen Stadium; Eugene, OR | ABC | W 34–33 | 59,269 | |
| September 30 | 12:30 pm | at Arizona State | No. 13 | Sun Devil Stadium; Tempe, AZ | ABC | W 48–13 | 59,526 | |
| October 7 | 5:00 pm | at No. 20 California | No. 11 | California Memorial Stadium; Berkeley, CA | ABC | L 24–45 | 72,516 | |
| October 14 | 12:30 pm | UCLA | No. 18 | Autzen Stadium; Eugene, OR | ABC | W 30–20 | 58,618 | |
| October 21 | 2:00 pm | at Washington State | No. 16 | Martin Stadium; Pullman, WA | | L 23–34 | 35,117 | |
| October 28 | 4:00 pm | Portland State* | No. 25 | Autzen Stadium; Eugene, OR | OSN | W 55–12 | 57,493 | |
| November 4 | 12:30 pm | Washington^{†} | No. 24 | Autzen Stadium; Eugene, OR (rivalry) | TBS | W 34–14 | 58,408 | |
| November 11 | 7:15 pm | at No. 7 USC | No. 21 | Los Angeles Memorial Coliseum; Los Angeles, CA (rivalry) | FSN | L 10–35 | 92,000 | |
| November 18 | 12:30 pm | Arizona | | Autzen Stadium; Eugene, OR | OSN | L 10–37 | 58,029 | |
| November 24 | 12:30 pm | at Oregon State | | Reser Stadium; Corvallis, OR (Civil War) | FSN | L 28–30 | 44,015 | |
| December 21 | 5:00 pm | vs. No. 20 BYU* | | Sam Boyd Stadium; Whitney, NV (Las Vegas Bowl) | ESPN2 | L 8–38 | 44,615 | |
*Non-conference game; ^{†}Homecoming; Rankings from AP Poll released prior to the game; All times are in Pacific time

== Rankings ==
Ranking movements Legend: ██ Increase in ranking ██ Decrease in ranking — = Not ranked RV = Received votes
| | Week | | | | | | | | | | | | | | | |
| Poll | Pre | 1 | 2 | 3 | 4 | 5 | 6 | 7 | 8 | 9 | 10 | 11 | 12 | 13 | 14 | Final |
|---|---|---|---|---|---|---|---|---|---|---|---|---|---|---|---|---|
| AP | 21 | 20 | 18 | 13 | 14 | 11 | 18 | 16 | 25 | 24 | 21 | RV | — | — | — | — |
| Coaches Poll | 20 | 20 | 18 | 12 | 12 | 11 | 18 | 15 | 24 | 22 | 20 | RV | — | — | — | — |
| Harris | Not released | | | | 13 | 11 | 20 | 15 | 24 | 22 | 20 | 25 | — | — | — | Not released |
| BCS | Not released | | | | | | | 14 | 23 | 22 | 20 | 24 | — | — | — | Not released |

== Game summaries ==
=== Stanford ===
| | 1 | 2 | 3 | 4 | Total |
|---|---|---|---|---|---|
| Cardinal | 3 | 7 | 0 | 0 | 10 |
| Ducks | 3 | 24 | 7 | 14 | 48 |

In their first game of the year, the Ducks routed Stanford 48–10. Jonathan Stewart had two touchdowns and 168 yards rushing in the game, although he was forced out due to an ankle sprain. Oregon and Stanford exchanged field goals in the first quarter, before Stewart's first touchdown run gave the Ducks a 10–3 lead with 13:36 left in the second. A 15-yard touchdown pass from Dennis Dixon to Jaison Williams extended Oregon's lead to 17–3. The Cardinal responded with a 26-yard touchdown pass by Trent Edwards, but the Ducks scored 10 points in the half's final 3:19, including Stewart's second touchdown run of the game. At halftime, Oregon held a 27–10 lead.

The only score of the third quarter was made by Dixon, who ran for two yards and a touchdown midway through the quarter to stretch the Oregon lead to 24 points. Following a missed field goal attempt by Stanford, Jeremiah Johnson had a three-yard touchdown run to give the Ducks a 41–10 lead in the fourth quarter. The scoring was concluded by Oregon's A. J. Tuitele, who picked up a blocked Stanford field goal attempt and ran for a 72-yard touchdown. A total of 58,450 people attended the game at Autzen Stadium; this was the fourth-most ever and the biggest crowd for a season-opening game.

=== Fresno State ===
| | 1 | 2 | 3 | 4 | Total |
|---|---|---|---|---|---|
| Ducks | 14 | 3 | 7 | 7 | 31 |
| Bulldogs | 3 | 7 | 7 | 7 | 24 |

The No. 20-ranked Ducks won in a tight contest at Fresno State, 31–24. At halftime, Oregon held a 17–10 lead, but on its first possession of the second half Fresno State scored a game-tying touchdown. Later in the third quarter, Oregon drove down the field and attempted a 36-yard field goal. The kick was blocked by Fresno State's Bear Pascoe, but a Bulldog went to pick up the ball instead of leaving it, which would have resulted in a turnover. He was unable to field it, and the Ducks recovered at the Fresno State five-yard line. Oregon scored on the next play through a Jeremiah Johnson run; it was his second touchdown run of the game.

Fresno State responded in the fourth quarter with another game-tying drive, which featured a 40-yard Dwayne Wright rush. Tom Brandstater scored from one yard out to force a 24–24 tie. Oregon drove down the field, but was kept out of the end zone on a third-and-goal play, apparently forcing the Ducks to settle for a field goal. However, they ran a trick play; Brady Leaf, the holder on kicks, took off running and pitched the ball to kicker Paul Martinez, who ran four yards for what turned out to be the game-winning touchdown.

This was Belotti's 92nd win as Ducks head coach, vaulting him past his former boss, Rich Brooks, to become the winningest coach in school history.

=== Oklahoma ===
| Team | 1 | 2 | 3 | 4 | Total |
|---|---|---|---|---|---|
| Oklahoma | 3 | 3 | 14 | 13 | 33 |
| • Oregon | 10 | 3 | 0 | 21 | 34 |

- Date: September 16
- Location: Autzen Stadium, Eugene, OR
- Game start: 12:30 p.m. PST
- Television network: ABC

Scoring summary
| 1 | 13:39 | ORE | Jonathan Stewart 3-yard run (Paul Martinez kick) | ORE 7–0 |
| 1 | 7:08 | ORE | Paul Martinez 22-yard field goal | ORE 10–0 |
| 1 | 2:28 | OU | Garrett Hartley 41-yard field goal | ORE 10–3 |
| 2 | 2:01 | OU | Garrett Hartley 20-yard field goal | ORE 10–6 |
| 2 | 0:00 | ORE | Paul Martinez 48-yard field goal | ORE 13–6 |
| 3 | 8:50 | OU | Paul Thompson 1-yard run (Garrett Hartley kick) | Tied 13–13 |
| 3 | 3:48 | OU | Malcolm Kelly 31-yard pass from Paul Thompson (Garrett Hartley kick) | OU 20–13 |
| 4 | 14:49 | ORE | Jaison Williams 30-yard pass from Dennis Dixon (Paul Martinez kick) | Tied 20–20 |
| 4 | 12:19 | OU | Adrian Peterson 17-yard run (Garrett Hartley kick) | OU 27–20 |
| 4 | 6:46 | OU | Garrett Hartley 20-yard field goal | OU 30–20 |
| 4 | 3:12 | OU | Garrett Hartley 22-yard field goal | OU 33–20 |
| 4 | 1:12 | ORE | Dennis Dixon 16-yard run (Paul Martinez kick) | OU 33–27 |
| 4 | 0:46 | ORE | Brian Paysinger 23-yard pass from Dennis Dixon (Paul Martinez kick) | ORE 34–33 |

Oregon, after a 16-yard TD by Dennis Dixon, trailed the Sooners 33–27 with 1:12 left. After a botched onside kick attempt which both teams claimed to recover the ruling on the field was to give Oregon the ball. Oklahoma claimed that the ball had made contact with an Oregon player before it went 10 yards (necessary on an onside kick), so the ball should still be theirs. The play was reviewed by Pac-10 replay official Gordon Riese. The angle Riese used did not clearly show the contact but did show that Oregon had not actually recovered the ball. Because this was not the challenge on the field, the call was not reversed. A 23-yard touchdown pass by Dixon with 46 seconds left gave Oregon a 34–33 lead. A squib kick was recovered by Oklahoma's Reggie Smith for 55 yards, setting Garrett Hartley up for a 44-yard field goal attempt. The kick was blocked by Oregon, clinching the Ducks' 34–33 win. Dixon had 341 passing yards and two touchdown passes, in addition to running for a touchdown.

=== Arizona State ===
| | 1 | 2 | 3 | 4 | Total |
|---|---|---|---|---|---|
| Ducks | 14 | 10 | 10 | 17 | 51 |
| Sun Devils | 0 | 3 | 10 | 0 | 13 |

The Ducks scored two touchdowns in the first quarter to take an early 14–0 lead. Following an Arizona State field goal midway through the second quarter, Oregon scored 10 points in the final 3:46 of the first half for a 24–3 halftime lead. At the start of the third quarter, Jeremiah Johnson's 4-yard touchdown was quickly answered by a kickoff return for a touchdown by Terry Richardson. Finally in the fourth, the Ducks scored 17 unanswered points to close the game with a 48–13 margin of victory.

=== California ===
| | 1 | 2 | 3 | 4 | Total |
|---|---|---|---|---|---|
| Ducks | 3 | 7 | 7 | 7 | 24 |
| Golden Bears | 14 | 14 | 10 | 7 | 45 |

In their fifth game of the season, the Ducks, ranked 11th, suffered their first loss against 16th-ranked California. Following an interception of a Dennis Dixon pass by Brandon Hampton during the first possession of the game, the Golden Bears scored a touchdown to take an early 7–0 lead. California stretched its lead to 14–3 by the end of the first quarter and added two more touchdowns in the second quarter for a 28–3 lead. With 1:04 left in the first half, the Ducks scored their first touchdown of the game, having successfully faked a field goal attempt earlier in the drive. The Golden Bears scored the first 10 points of the third quarter, extending their lead to 28 points. Dixon threw two touchdown passes in the final 15:20 of the game, but the Golden Bears finished with a 45–24 win. For California, DeSean Jackson caught a touchdown pass and returned a punt for another touchdown. Dixon threw three interceptions in the game for Oregon, and Jonathan Stewart was held to 25 yards rushing, though he did score a touchdown.

=== UCLA ===
| | 1 | 2 | 3 | 4 | Total |
|---|---|---|---|---|---|
| Bruins | 3 | 3 | 0 | 14 | 20 |
| Ducks | 20 | 7 | 0 | 3 | 30 |

This game was one of firsts. It was the first win in Autzen Stadium against UCLA since 2000. Oregon's 20-point lead in the first quarter marked the first points UCLA had given up in the first quarter this entire season.

Both teams held a record of 4 wins, 1 loss at the time of the game.

In the first quarter, Oregon scored 3 touchdowns and UCLA scored one field goal. In the second quarter, UCLA's Justin Medlock scored a field goal, bringing UCLA's score to 6 points. In the third quarter, James Finley scored a touchdown for Oregon, bringing their score to 27 points. In the fourth quarter, UCLA'S Kahil Bell scored two touchdowns and Oregon's Matt Everson also scored a touchdown. The final score was 30–20, a win for Oregon.

Throughout this season, UCLA had only allowed 50 yards defensively a game. In this game, Oregon ran 256 yards.

Both teams suffered 8 penalties, but Oregon gave up only 56 yards in contrast to UCLA, who gave up 91 yards.

The leading player for Oregon was Dennis Dixon who scored two touchdowns, completed 10 of the 17 passes, and ran 144 yards.

=== Washington State ===
| | 1 | 2 | 3 | 4 | Total |
|---|---|---|---|---|---|
| Ducks | 0 | 3 | 0 | 20 | 23 |
| Cougars | 0 | 13 | 14 | 7 | 34 |

=== Portland State ===
| | 1 | 2 | 3 | 4 | Total |
|---|---|---|---|---|---|
| Vikings | 6 | 6 | 0 | 0 | 12 |
| Ducks | 14 | 21 | 10 | 10 | 55 |

=== Washington ===
| | 1 | 2 | 3 | 4 | Total |
|---|---|---|---|---|---|
| Huskies | 0 | 7 | 7 | 0 | 14 |
| Ducks | 7 | 10 | 14 | 3 | 34 |

=== USC ===
| | 1 | 2 | 3 | 4 | Total |
|---|---|---|---|---|---|
| Ducks | 0 | 0 | 3 | 7 | 10 |
| Trojans | 0 | 14 | 14 | 7 | 35 |

The game was the first time the Oregon Ducks had played at the Los Angeles Coliseum since the 2000 season when Paul Hackett was still USC's coach. The game was USC's homecoming game.

In the first quarter, neither team scored any points. In the second quarter, USC scored 2 touchdowns, one by C. J. Gable and the other by Chauncey Washington, for a total of 14 points. In the third quarter, Oregon earned 3 points via a field goal by Paul Martinez. USC earned 2 additional touchdowns, bringing their total to 28 points. Both these touchdowns were also made by Chauncey Washington. In the fourth quarter, Oregon scored their first and only touchdown of the game, bringing their final score to 10 points. This touchdown was scored by Jonathan Stewart. USC earned a final touchdown via Dwayne Jarrett, bringing the Trojans' final score to 35. The game ended with a final score of 35–10.

=== Arizona ===
| | 1 | 2 | 3 | 4 | Total |
|---|---|---|---|---|---|
| Wildcats | 14 | 10 | 10 | 3 | 37 |
| Ducks | 3 | 7 | 0 | 0 | 10 |

=== Oregon State ===
| | 1 | 2 | 3 | 4 | Total |
|---|---|---|---|---|---|
| Ducks | 7 | 0 | 7 | 14 | 28 |
| Beavers | 7 | 13 | 7 | 3 | 30 |

Postseason

=== BYU ===
| | 1 | 2 | 3 | 4 | Total |
|---|---|---|---|---|---|
| Cougars | 0 | 17 | 7 | 14 | 38 |
| Ducks | 0 | 0 | 0 | 8 | 8 |

Oregon's final game of the season took place in Sam Boyd Stadium in Las Vegas, NV since it was a bowl game. The 2006 Las Vegas Bowl matched the Ducks against BYU.

This game marked BYU's first bowl win in 10 years since the 1996 football season. BYU ended their season with 11 wins and 2 losses.

BYU had over twice the number of total yards, 548 yds, to Oregon's 260 yds.

In the first quarter, neither team scored. In the second quarter, BYU's Jared McLaughlin had a 24yd FG; 2 touchdowns were also scored by BYU's Curtis Brown and Jonny Harline respectively. Curtis Brown scored his second touchdown of the night, bringing BYU's total score to 24 points by the end of the third quarter. Oregon scored their first and only touchdown of the night in the fourth quarter, resulting in a total score of 8 points. In the fourth quarter, BYU earned 2 additional touchdowns bringing their final score to 38 points.

The leading performers for BYU were Jonny Harline and John Beck.

== Personnel ==
=== Roster ===
| Wide receivers: 1 Garren Strong – Junior; 2 Jordan Kent – Senior; 3 Cameron Colvin – Junior; 4 Jaison Williams – Sophomore; 6 Derrick Jones – Freshman; 18 James Finely – Senior; 19 Brian Paysinger – Junior; 26 Kyle Weatherspoon – Senior; 39 Todd Crowley – Freshman; 80 Drew Larson – Senior; 86 Ryan Mattice – Sophomore; 87 Rory Cavaille – (redshirt) Freshman; 88 Brandon Bair – Freshman; 92 Aaron McVein – Freshman; 93 Nicholas Dahlen – (redshirt) Freshman; Offensive line: 51 Jeff Kendall – Sophomore; 54 Jordan Holmes – Freshman; 55 Enoka Lucas – Senior; 57 Fenuki Tupou – Junior; 60 Max Unger – Sophomore; 61 Josh Tschirgi – Sophomore; 63 Jon Teague – Sophomore; 66 Pat So'oalo – Junior; 67 Sean Cullen – Junior; 68 C.E. Kaiser – Freshman; 69 Bo Thran – Freshman; 70 Landis Provancha – Freshman; 71 Mark Lewis – Sophomore; 72 Justin Talarizadeh – Freshman; 75 Geoff Schwartz – Junior; 77 Paluni Ma Sun – Senior; 78 Jacob Hucko – Sophomore; Tight ends: 44 Dante Rosario – Senior; 81 Ryan Keeling – Sophomore; 88 Brandon Bair – Freshman | Quarterbacks: 7 Nathan Costa – Freshman; 10 Dennis Dixon – Junior; 11 Justin Roper – Freshman; 12 Cody Kempt – Freshman; 16 Brady Leaf – Junior; Fullbacks None Designated on Roster Running backs: 5 Remene Alston Jr. – Freshman; 22 Chris Vincent – Senior; 23 Andre Crenshaw – Freshman; 24 Jeremiah Johnson – Sophomore; 27 Andiel Brown – Junior; 28 Jonathan Stewart – Sophomore; Defensive line: 43 Michael Speed – Sophomore; 45 Matt Toeaina – Senior; 49 Nick Reed – Sophomore; 50 Simi Toeaina – (redshirt) Freshman; 56 Victor Filipe – Senior; 89 Michael DiVincenzo – Sophomore; 90 David Faaeteete – Junior; 91 Harris Ra'shon – Sophomore; 92 Micah Howeth – Junior; 93 Dexter Manley II – Junior; 94 Hayden Piper – Freshman; 95 Darius Sanders – Senior; 96 Jordan Spence – Freshman; 97 Cole Linehan – Sophomore; 99 Jeremy Gibbs – Junior | Linebackers: 25 Kevin Garrett – (redshirt) Freshman; 33 Blair Phillips – Senior; 34 A.J. Tuitele – Junior; 38 Chris Mulvanny – Senior; 40 John Bacon – Sophomore; 42 Brent Haberly – Senior; 47 Jason Turner – Junior; 53 Erik Elshire – Sophomore; 87 Josh Thomas-Dotson – Junior; Defensive backs: 2 Terrell Ward – (redshirt) Freshman; 6 Walter Thurmond III – (redshirt) Freshman; 7 Chad Peppars – Freshman; 8 Jackie Bates – Junior; 17 Willie Glasper – (redshirt) Freshman; 20 Matthew Harper – Junior; 23 Brian Butterfield – Freshman; 31 Jameel Dowling – Junior; 41 Marvin Johnson – Freshman; Safeties and Rovers: 9 Ryan DePalo – Junior; 13 Jerome Boyd – Sophomore; 15 Patrick Chung (ROV) – Sophomore; 27 Titus Jackson – (redshirt) Freshman; 28 J.D. Nelson – Senior; 29 Parris Moore (ROV) – Senior; 30 Kwame Agyeman – Junior; 32 Jarius Byrd – Freshman; 35 Spencer Paysinger – Freshman; 48 Jon Pope – Senior; Punters: 14 Matt Dragich – Senior; 98 Aaron Knowles – Senior; Kickers: 36 Paul Martinez – Senior; 40 Luke Bellotti – Junior; 41 Morgan Flint – (redshirt) Freshman; 85 Matt Evensen – Sophomore |
† Starter at position Injured; will not play in 2006

=== Coaching staff ===
| Name | Position | Year at Oregon | Alma mater (year) |
|---|---|---|---|
| Mike Bellotti | Head coach | 12th | UC Davis (1973) |
| Neal Zoumboukos | Assistant head coach Tight ends | 27th | UC Davis (1968) |
| Nick Aliotti | Defensive coordinator | 16th | UC Davis (1986) |
| Gary Crowton | Offensive coordinator | 2nd | BYU (1983) |
| Gary Campbell | Running backs | 23rd | UCLA (1973) |
