= 2006 Stanford Cardinal football team =

American college football season

2006 Stanford Cardinal football
- Conference: Pacific-10 Conference
- Record: 1–11 (1–8 Pac-10)
- Head coach: Walt Harris (2nd season)
- Offensive scheme: West Coast
- Defensive coordinator: A. J. Christoff (4th season)
- Base defense: 4–3
- Home stadium: Stanford Stadium

2006 Pacific-10 Conference football standings
	Conf.			Overall
Team	W		L	W		L
No. 4 USC +	7	–	2	11	–	2
No. 14 California +	7	–	2	10	–	3
No. 21 Oregon State	6	–	3	10	–	4
UCLA	5	–	4	7	–	6
Arizona State	4	–	5	7	–	6
Oregon	4	–	5	7	–	6
Arizona	4	–	5	6	–	6
Washington State	4	–	5	6	–	6
Washington	3	–	6	5	–	7
Stanford	1	–	8	1	–	11
+ – Conference co-champions; Rankings from AP Poll

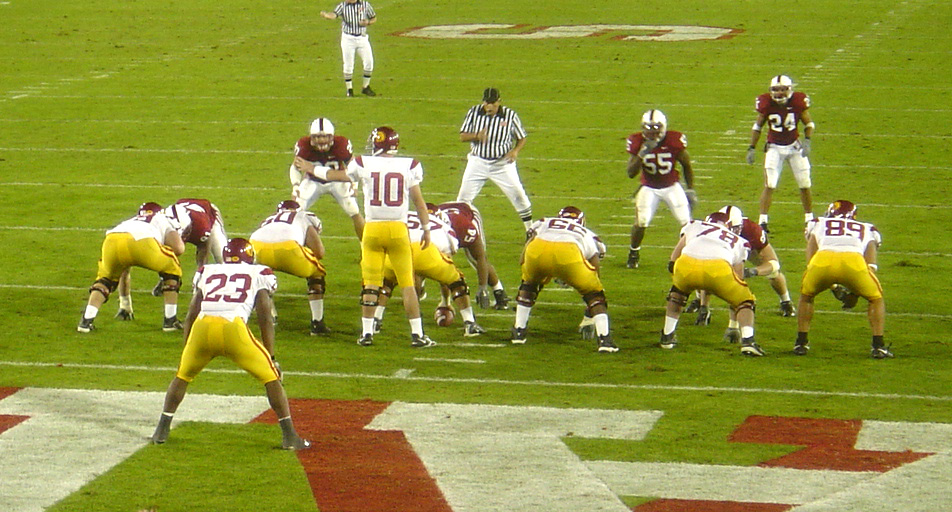

The 2006 Stanford Cardinal football team represented Stanford University in the 2006 NCAA Division I FBS football season. In head coach Walt Harris's second season at Stanford, the Cardinal won only one game, ending the season with a 1–11 record, the school's worst since a winless 1960 season. Harris was fired on December 4, 2006, two days after Stanford's regular season ended. By the end of his tenure at Stanford, Harris had surpassed Jack Curtice with the lowest winning percentage in the history of Stanford football, with a 26.1% win record.

The team played their home games at the newly renovated Stanford Stadium in Stanford, California and competed in the Pacific-10 Conference.

== Schedule ==
Date	Time	Opponent	Site	TV	Result	Attendance
September 2	12:30 p.m.	at No. 21 Oregon	Autzen Stadium; Eugene, OR (rivalry)	ABC	L 10–48	58,450
September 9	3:00 p.m.	at San Jose State*	Spartan Stadium; San Jose, CA (rivalry)	CSNW	L 34–35	29,321
September 16	7:00 p.m.	Navy*	Stanford Stadium; Stanford, CA	FSNBA	L 9–37	44,022
September 23	2:00 p.m.	Washington State	Stanford Stadium; Stanford, CA		L 10–36	37,498
September 30	7:15 p.m.	at UCLA	Rose Bowl; Pasadena, CA (rivalry)	FSN	L 0–31	72,095
October 7	11:30 a.m.	at No. 12 Notre Dame*	Notre Dame Stadium; Notre Dame, IN (Legends Trophy)	NBC	L 10–31	80,795
October 14	2:00 p.m.	Arizona^{†}	Stanford Stadium; Stanford, CA		L 7–20	39,317
October 21	12:30 p.m.	at Arizona State	Sun Devil Stadium; Tempe, AZ		L 3–38	53,323
November 4	4:00 p.m.	No. 9 USC	Stanford Stadium; Stanford, CA (rivalry)	FSN	L 0–42	49,371
November 11	12:30 p.m.	at Washington	Husky Stadium; Seattle, WA		W 20–3	55,896
November 18	12:30 p.m.	Oregon State	Stanford Stadium; Stanford, CA	FSNBA	L 7–30	38,502
December 2	12:00 p.m.	at No. 20 California	California Memorial Stadium; Berkeley, CA (109th Big Game)	FSNBA	L 17–26	72,516
*Non-conference game; ^{†}Homecoming; Rankings from AP Poll released prior to the game; All times are in Pacific time

== Coaches ==
Name	Position	Year at Stanford	Alma mater (year)
Walt Harris	Head coach Offensive coordinator Quarterbacks	2nd	Pacific (1968)
A.J. Christoff	Defensive coordinator Defensive backs	1st	Idaho (1971)
Tom Freeman	Offensive line (centers & Guards); Run Game Coordinator	2nd	San Diego State (1969)
Jeff Hammerschmidt	Outside Linebackers; Special teams	1st	Arizona (1991)
Nate Nelson	Specialists; Recruiting coordinator	2nd	UC Davis (2001)
Darrell Peterson	Inside linebackers	2nd	TCU (1984)
Buzz Preston	Running backs	4th	Hawaii (1982)
Doug Sams	Offensive line (Tackles & tight ends)	1st	Oregon State (1978)
Dave Tipton	Defensive line	18th	Stanford (1971)
Tucker Waugh	Wide receivers	2nd	DePauw (1993)
Ron Forbes	Strength and conditioning	5th	Florida (1995)

== Game summaries ==
=== Oregon ===
	1	2	3	4	Total
Cardinal	3	7	0	0	10
#21 Ducks	3	24	7	14	48

=== San Jose State ===
	1	2	3	4	Total
Cardinal	13	21	0	0	34
Spartans	7	14	14	0	35

=== Navy ===
	1	2	3	4	Total
Midshipmen	3	7	17	10	37
Cardinal	0	3	0	6	9

=== Washington State ===
	1	2	3	4	Total
Cougars	2	20	7	7	36
Cardinal	0	0	3	7	10

=== UCLA ===
	1	2	3	4	Total
Cardinal	0	0	0	0	0
Bruins	7	0	7	17	31

=== Notre Dame ===
	1	2	3	4	Total
Cardinal	3	0	0	7	10
#12 Fighting Irish	7	7	10	7	31

=== Arizona ===
	1	2	3	4	Total
Wildcats	14	3	3	10	30
Cardinal	0	7	0	0	7

=== Arizona State ===
	1	2	3	4	Total
Cardinal	0	0	3	0	3
Sun Devils	10	7	14	7	38

=== USC ===
	1	2	3	4	Total
#9 Trojans	7	21	7	7	42
Cardinal	0	0	0	0	0

=== Washington ===
	1	2	3	4	Total
Cardinal	0	3	7	10	20
Huskies	0	3	0	0	3

=== Oregon State ===
	1	2	3	4	Total
Beavers	7	13	3	7	30
Cardinal	7	0	0	0	7

=== California ===
	1	2	3	4	Total
Cardinal	0	10	7	0	17
#20 Golden Bears	3	10	10	3	26
