= 2006 Las Vegas Bowl =

2006 Pioneer PureVision Las Vegas Bowl
- 15th Las Vegas Bowl
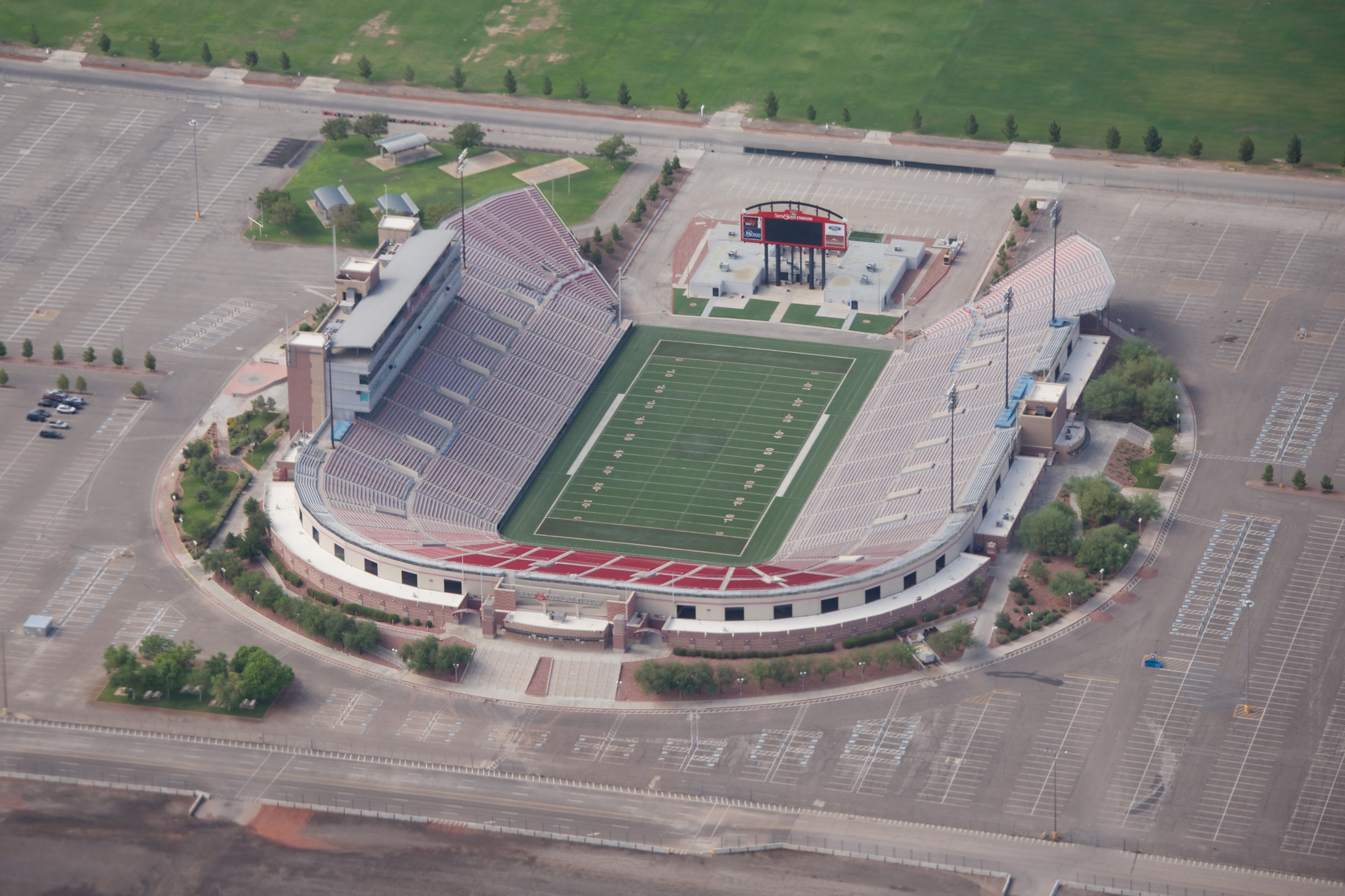
- Sam Boyd Stadium in Whitney, Nevada, hosted the Las Vegas Bowl.
BYU Cougars	Oregon Ducks
(10–2)	(7–5)
Mountain West	Pac-10
38	8
Head coach: Bronco Mendenhall	Head coach: Mike Bellotti
AP / Coaches / BCS; 19 / 20 / 20
	1	2	3	4	Total
BYU	0	17	7	14	38
Oregon	0	0	0	8	8
- Date: December 21, 2006
- Season: 2006
- Stadium: Sam Boyd Stadium
- Location: Whitney, Nevada
- MVP: Jonny Harline (TE, BYU)
- Referee: Nick Define (MAC)
- Attendance: 44,615
- Payout: US$1,000,000 per team

United States TV coverage
- Network: ESPN
- Announcers: Bob Davie, Craig James, Brent Musburger, and Lisa Salters

The 2006 Las Vegas Bowl was an NCAA-sanctioned Division I post-season college football bowl game between the Brigham Young University Cougars and the Oregon Ducks. The game was played on December 22, 2006, starting at 5 p.m. PST at 40,000-seat Sam Boyd Stadium in Whitney, Nevada, where the bowl has been played since 1992. It was televised on ESPN.

Starting in 2001, the Las Vegas Bowl featured a matchup of teams from the Mountain West Conference (MWC) and Pacific-10 Conference (Pac-10), with organizers having first choice of bowl-eligible teams from the MWC, and the fourth or fifth choice (alternating annually) of bowl-eligible teams from the Pac-10.

== Game summary ==
Riding a 9-game winning streak entering the game, a veteran BYU squad led by seniors John Beck, Curtis Brown, Jonny Harline, and Justin Robinson dominated Oregon from the start. Beck had 375 yards passing and accounted for 3 touchdowns, while Brown ran for an additional 120 yards and 2 touchdowns. Harline, an All-American tight end, earned MVP honors with 9 catches for 181 yards and a score. Robinson had 2 interceptions and led a strong effort by the Cougar defense that held the Ducks to just 120 yards through the first three quarters of play. Oregon had attempted to confuse BYU by alternating Dennis Dixon and Brady Leaf at quarterback, but it seemed to backfire, as the Ducks' offense never established any rhythm. Oregon's only touchdown came on a 47-yard pass play in the fourth quarter, after the game's outcome had already been decided. The victory was particularly satisfying for BYU, as Oregon head coach Mike Bellotti had made controversial comments prior to the game indicating that BYU (from the Mountain West conference) was not good enough to compete in the Pac-10.

== Statistics ==
Statistics	BYU	ORE
First downs	30	14
Plays–yards	78-548	64-260
Rushes–yards	31-173	30-94
Passing yards	375	166
Passing: comp–att–int	28-47-2	16-34-2
Time of possession	20:59	14:55

Team	Category	Player	Statistics
BYU	Passing	John Beck	28/46, 375 yards, 2 TD, 2 INT
BYU	Rushing	Curtis Brown	17 carries, 120 yards, 2 TD
BYU	Receiving	Johnny Harline	9 receptions, 181 yards, 1 TD
Oregon	Passing	Dennis Dixon	10/20, 122 yards, 1 TD, 1 INT
Oregon	Rushing	Dennis Dixon	10 carries, 51 yards
Oregon	Receiving	Brian Paysinger	1 reception, 47 yards, 1 TD

== Additional notes ==
- This was the Cougars' first bowl victory since defeating Kansas State in the 1997 Cotton Bowl Classic.
- Oregon wore their black-black home uniform with a unique logo-less helmet.
- The official attendance of 44,615 set a new stadium record and was the largest crowd ever attend a team sports event in the state of Nevada.
