= 2006 Holiday Bowl =

2006 Pacific Life Holiday Bowl
- Holiday Bowl logo
Texas A&M Aggies	California Golden Bears
(9–3)	(9–3)
Big 12	Pac-10
10	45
Head coach: Dennis Franchione	Head coach: Jeff Tedford
AP / Coaches / BCS; 21 / 21 / 21	AP / Coaches / BCS; 20 / 19 / 18
	1	2	3	4	Total
Texas A&M	7	3	0	0	10
California	7	7	14	17	45
- Date: December 28, 2006
- Season: 2006
- Stadium: Qualcomm Stadium
- Location: San Diego, California
- MVP: Co-Offensive: Marshawn Lynch (Cal); Co-Offensive: Nate Longshore (Cal); Defensive: Desmond Bishop (Cal)
- Referee: John O'Neill (Big Ten)
- Attendance: 62,395
- Payout: US$2,334,186 per team

United States TV coverage
- Network: ESPN
- Announcers: Chris Fowler, Kirk Herbstreit, Erin Andrews

The 2006 Pacific Life Holiday Bowl was a college football bowl game played December 28, 2006, in San Diego, California. It was part of the 2006 NCAA Division I FBS football season and one of 32 games in the 2006–07 bowl season. It featured the Texas A&M Aggies representing the Big 12 against the Pac-10 co-champion California Golden Bears. In the Golden Bears' second trip to the Holiday Bowl in three years, they routed the Aggies, 45–10. Each conference received $2.2 million for the teams playing.

== Game summary ==
=== Scoring Summary ===
Scoring summary

Quarter	Time	Drive			Team	Scoring information	Score	
Quarter	Time	Plays	Yards	TOP	Team	Scoring information	TAMU	CAL
1	11:13	6	61	2:02	TAMU	Chad Schroeder 19-yard touchdown reception from Stephen McGee, Matt Szymanski kick good	7	0
1	8:01	8	80	3:08	CAL	Nate Longshore 6-yard touchdown run, Tom Schneider kick good	7	7
2	14:28	5	68	1:51	CAL	Marshawn Lynch 2-yard touchdown run, Tom Schneider kick good	7	14
2	2:08	14	66	7:41	TAMU	32-yard field goal by Matt Szymanski	10	14
3	10:13	4	41	1:40	CAL	Marshawn Lynch 2-yard touchdown run, Tom Schneider kick good	10	21
3	2:00	9	72	4:46	CAL	Lavelle Hawkins 3-yard touchdown reception from Nate Longshore, Tom Schneider kick good	10	28
4	7:13	10	84	4:37	CAL	21-yard field goal by Tom Schneider	10	31
4	3:40	4	51	1:26	CAL	Justin Forsett 7-yard touchdown run, Tom Schneider kick good	10	38
4	1:31	3	5	1:46	CAL	Bryan Schutte 3-yard touchdown run, Tom Schneider kick good	10	45
"TOP" = time of possession. For other American football terms, see Glossary of American football.							10	45

=== Statistics ===
Statistics	TAMU	CAL
First downs	21	22
Total yards	349	476
Rushes–yards	38–163	32–241
Passing yards	198	235
Passing: Comp–Att–Int	18–29–1	19–24–1
Time of possession	21:35	15:05
