= 2006 California Golden Bears football team =

American college football season

2006 California Golden Bears football

Pac-10 co-champion Holiday Bowl champion

Holiday Bowl, W 45–10 vs. Texas A&M
- Conference: Pacific-10 Conference

Ranking
- Coaches: No. 14
- AP: No. 14
- Record: 10–3 (7–2 Pac-10)
- Head coach: Jeff Tedford (5th season)
- Offensive coordinator: Mike Dunbar (1st season)
- Offensive scheme: Pro-style
- Defensive coordinator: Bob Gregory (5th season)
- Base defense: 4–3
- Home stadium: California Memorial Stadium

2006 Pacific-10 Conference football standings
	Conf.			Overall
Team	W		L	W		L
No. 4 USC +	7	–	2	11	–	2
No. 14 California +	7	–	2	10	–	3
No. 21 Oregon State	6	–	3	10	–	4
UCLA	5	–	4	7	–	6
Arizona State	4	–	5	7	–	6
Oregon	4	–	5	7	–	6
Arizona	4	–	5	6	–	6
Washington State	4	–	5	6	–	6
Washington	3	–	6	5	–	7
Stanford	1	–	8	1	–	11
+ – Conference co-champions; Rankings from AP Poll

The 2006 California Golden Bears football team represented the University of California, Berkeley, in the 2006 NCAA Division I FBS football season. They played their home games at California Memorial Stadium in Berkeley, California, and were coached by Jeff Tedford.

The Bears began the season with a number 12 ranking. After sustaining an upset by then number 23-ranked Tennessee in their opening game, the Bears won their next eight games before suffering another upset to unranked Arizona followed by a subsequent loss to then number 4 USC. All of these defeats came in away games. The Bears qualified for a share of the Pac-10 title after USC was upset by rival UCLA the following week. The team made its second Holiday Bowl in three years, blowing out #21 Texas A&M and finishing the season ranked #14.

== Preseason ==
After Jeff Tedford took the Cal football coaching job after their 1–10 2001 campaign, Cal saw an immense improvement in its football program, having five straight winning seasons from 2002 to 2006.

This particular Bears team, with talent returning from their previous season, generated quantified preseason hype amongst NCCA fans, with the preseason AP Poll ranking the Bears 9th overall, while the Coaches Poll rated them 12th overall, resulting in their highest ranking since 1952. After a season-ending injury in the first game of the 2005 season, sophomore Nate Longshore was named the starting quarterback for the Bears over Joe Ayoob, who had struggled in the 2005 games in which he had started. After a very impressive season, Cal also launched a program to officially campaign for running back Marshawn Lynch to win the Heisman Trophy.

In the College GameDay preview on ESPN, Lee Corso predicted the Bears to win the Pac-10 championship over the USC Trojans, and even went as far to say the Bears would win the national championship over West Virginia, saying "they play a tough schedule, but they could lose to Tennessee and still run 11 straight ball games. I like Cal...I'm telling you, it's Cal versus West Virginia, and then Cal wins it; the national title goes to Cal."

== Schedule ==
Date	Time	Opponent	Rank	Site	TV	Result	Attendance	Source
September 2	2:30 p.m.	at No. 23 Tennessee*	No. 9	Neyland Stadium; Knoxville, TN	ESPN	L 18–35	106,009	
September 9	4:00 p.m.	Minnesota*	No. 22	California Memorial Stadium; Berkeley, CA	TBS	W 42–17	55,035	
September 16	3:15 p.m.	Portland State*	No. 21	California Memorial Stadium; Berkeley, CA	CSN	W 42–16	61,082	
September 23	12:30 p.m.	No. 22 Arizona State	No. 21	California Memorial Stadium; Berkeley, CA	FSN	W 49–21	58,024	
September 30	2:30 p.m.	at Oregon State	No. 20	Reser Stadium; Corvallis, OR		W 41–13	39,309	
October 7	5:00 p.m.	No. 11 Oregon^{†}	No. 16	California Memorial Stadium; Berkeley, CA	ABC	W 45–24	72,516	
October 14	2:00 p.m.	at Washington State	No. 10	Martin Stadium; Pullman, WA		W 21–3	31,441	
October 21	12:30 p.m.	Washington	No. 10	California Memorial Stadium; Berkeley, CA	FSN	W 31–24 ^{OT}	58,534	
November 4	5:00 p.m.	UCLA	No. 10	California Memorial Stadium; Berkeley, CA (rivalry)	ABC	W 38–24	72,516	
November 11	12:30 p.m.	at Arizona	No. 8	Arizona Stadium; Tucson, AZ	ABC	L 20–24	55,519	
November 18	5:00 p.m.	at No. 4 USC	No. 17	Los Angeles Memorial Coliseum; Los Angeles, CA	ABC	L 9–23	91,672	
December 2	12:00 p.m.	Stanford	No. 21	California Memorial Stadium; Berkeley, CA (Big Game)	FSN	W 26–17	72,516	
December 28	5:00 p.m.	vs. No. 21 Texas A&M*	No. 20	Qualcomm Stadium; San Diego, CA (Holiday Bowl)	ESPN	W 45–10	62,395	
*Non-conference game; ^{†}Homecoming; Rankings from AP Poll released prior to the game; All times are in Pacific time

== Rankings ==
Ranking movements Legend: ██ Increase in ranking ██ Decrease in ranking
	Week															
Poll	Pre	1	2	3	4	5	6	7	8	9	10	11	12	13	14	Final
AP	9	22	21	21	20	16	10	11	12	10	8	17	22	21	20	14
Coaches Poll	12	23	21	20	20	17	11	11	12	11	9	17	22	20	19	14
Harris	Not released				18	16	11	11	11	11	9	17	23	21	20	Not released
BCS	Not released							10	10	10	8	15	19	18	18	Not released

== Game summaries ==
=== Tennessee ===
	1	2	3	4	Total
No. 9 Golden Bears	0	0	3	15	18
No. 23 Volunteers	7	7	21	0	35

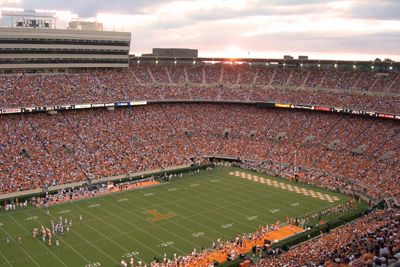
Neyland Stadium

Cal's opener was on the road against the #23 Tennessee Volunteers, a SEC team just coming off of a disappointing 5–6 season under coach Phillip Fulmer. With a hostile crowd of 106,009 watching at Neyland Stadium, Cal was torn to shreds. Tennessee quarterback Erik Ainge went 11 for 18 and passed for 291 yards and 4 touchdowns against the highly touted Cal defense. Vol receiver, Robert Meachem had a breakout game with 5 catches for 182 yards and 2 TD's. Newly appointed starting quarterback Nate Longshore struggled in his first road start, only passing for 85 yards. Heisman candidate Marshawn Lynch was held to 74 yards on 12 carries. While the Bears held Tennessee to 14 first-half points, a quick 80-yard touchdown pass from Ainge to Meachem at the start of the third quarter quickly started a tumble that ended up giving the Volunteers a 35–0 lead by the middle of the third quarter. The Tennessee secondary was then dispatched to finish the Bears off, and Joe Ayoob was substituted for Longshore, putting up 187 yards, including a touchdown. Tennessee racked up 514 yards against the Bears. Ainge later said "This game tonight wasn't just for Tennessee versus California. It was for the South versus the West Coast, the SEC versus the Pac-10."

Because the loss was so lopsided, and because Cal was expected to do highly well this season, many immediately dismissed Cal from any type of national discussion. Cal dropped 13 spots in the AP Poll to #22 and 11 spots in the Coaches Poll to #23, while Tennessee rose twelve spots in the AP poll to #11 and six spots to #17 in the Coaches Poll.

=== Minnesota ===
	1	2	3	4	Total
Golden Gophers	7	10	0	0	17
No. 22 Golden Bears	7	21	7	7	42

Cal got its first home game of the season on September 9 against the Minnesota Golden Gophers in front of a crowd of 55,035. The Gophers were 1–0 with their win against Kent State. Minnesota scored on its first drive, but the Bears bounced back with a touchdown in the first and second quarter to receivers Robert Jordan and DeSean Jackson, respectively. The Gophers' Dominic Jones responded with a 99-yard kickoff return touchdown. Eventually California pulled ahead on two touchdowns by Jackson, and led 28–17 at the half, and with two more touchdowns in the third and fourth quarter on rushes by Marshawn Lynch, the Bears put the Gophers away 42–17.

Nate Longshore bounced back in a big way from his previous start, finishing 22 for 31 with 300 yards and 4 touchdowns. He later joked about how it felt good to finally play a fourth quarter.

Lynch finished with 139 yards and 2 touchdowns on 27 carries, while backup running back Justin Forsett gathered 77 rushing yards of his own. Receivers Lavelle Hawkins and DeSean Jackson both finished with over 100 yards, with Jackson gathering three touchdowns as well. Cal got 531 yards of offense in all, compared to Minnesota's 352. Minnesota quarterback Bryan Cupito was 21 for 33 with 243 yards and 2 interceptions, both picked by Cal cornerback Daymeion Hughes.

With this loss, the Golden Gophers lost their first non-conference game in 18 tries, the longest streak in the Big Ten.

Cal rose in the polls one spot in the AP Poll to #21, and two spots in the Coaches Poll to #21, after this win.

=== Portland State ===
	1	2	3	4	Total
Vikings	3	13	0	0	16
No. 21 Golden Bears	21	21	0	0	42

Cal played at home the next week against the Portland State Vikings, a Division I Football Championship opponent that was the last team scheduled on the Bears' 2006 schedule. The Vikings were 2–0 going into this game at California Memorial Stadium before a crowd of 61,082. Portland State scored a field goal on their opening drive, but the Bears responded with three more touchdowns before the first quarter ended, one coming from a Daymeion Hughes 30-yard interception. In the second quarter, Marshawn Lynch posted a 71-yard touchdown run, and another touchdown midway through the third quarter put the Bears put 35–3. Portland State scored two quick touchdowns before the half ended, but the half closed with Cal receiver DeSean Jackson scoring on a 27-yard pass. Cal substituted many of its roster into the game in the second half, and neither team scored in the second half, as the Bears won 42–16, bringing their record to 2–1.

Cal brought in 502 total yards, 335 being in the first half. Nate Longshore passed for 225 yards, 2 touchdowns, and 1 interception. Lynch rushed for 112 yards and a touchdown on 6 carries, and Jackson had five catches for 103 yards and a score. Backup Cal quarterback Steve Levy also played, going 7 for 10 with 66 yards. Vikings quarterback Rob Freeman was 12 for 17 with 119 yards and a touchdown.

Despite this, Cal had three turnovers and 9 penalties which put them back over 100 yards. Both Jackson and Hughes seemed confident they could play better the next week in Pac-10 play.

With this win, Cal stayed steady in the AP Poll at #21, and rose one spot in the Coaches Poll to #20.

Portland State would finish the season 7–4, 6–2 in the Big Sky Conference.

=== Arizona State ===
	1	2	3	4	Total
No. 22 Sun Devils	7	7	7	0	21
No. 21 Golden Bears	14	28	0	7	49

On September 23, Cal played their first Pac-10 game of the season. This year, the Pac-10 football officials ruled to have twelve game schedules for its teams for the first time, and nine of those twelve games will be conference games, producing a full round-robin tournament in the conference to determine their champion.

They played against the Arizona State Sun Devils, ranked #22 in the AP Poll and #18 in the Coaches Poll. Many expected the Sun Devils to have a good chance to seriously compete for the conference title this year. They entered with a 3–0 record against non-conference opponents.

Arizona State scored on its opening drive, putting them up 7–0 early in the first quarter. But Cal answered back, putting up five straight touchdowns midway through the second quarter, four being passes by Nate Longshore and the fifth being an 80-yard punt return by DeSean Jackson. Arizona State scored again before the half, and just as the half winded down, Daymeion Hughes intercepted a pass for a score to put Cal up 42–14 when the first half was over. Both teams managed one more touchdown each in the second half to give Cal the 49–21 victory. Sun Devils coach Dirk Koetter confessed after the game, "When the pressure builds, even the routine plays become tough. This is exactly what happened to Cal at Tennessee."

Longshore passed for 270 yards and four touchdowns, while Marshawn Lynch added 124 rushing yards on 17 carries, including a receiving touchdown. Daymeion Hughes had his fifth interception in three games. Cal also controlled the ball for only slightly more than 23 minutes, compared to the Sun Devils 36 minutes, even though they easily outscored them.

After this win, Cal rose one spot in the AP Poll to number 20, and stayed steady in the Coaches Poll at number 20. Arizona State dropped from both polls after the loss.

The Sun Devils finished the season 7–6 (4–5 in the Pac-10), but lost the Hawaii Bowl to Hawaii and fired Koetter soon thereafter and replaced him with Dennis Erickson.

=== Oregon State ===
	1	2	3	4	Total
No. 20 Golden Bears	21	10	7	3	41
Beavers	0	3	3	7	13

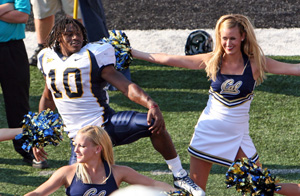
Marshawn Lynch celebrates the victory with the Cal cheerleaders

In week 5, Cal headed to Corvallis, Oregon to play the Oregon State Beavers at Reser Stadium. The Beavers had a 2–1 record going into this game, and had yet to play a Pac-10 matchup this season. Last season, the Beavers played a ranked Cal squad at Memorial Stadium in Berkeley and upset them 23–20, dropping the Bears from the rankings for the first time in over a year.

In front of a rowdy crowd, the Bears dominated the Beavers, scoring four touchdowns and hitting a field goal before the Beavers were able to score a field goal as the first half ended. In the second half, the Beavers scored another field goal and a fourth-quarter touchdown, but the Bears also managed another touchdown and field goal to end the game 41–13.

Nate Longshore had a career-high day, passing for 341 yards and four touchdowns, along with one interception. Marshawn Lynch also had a rushing touchdown, along with two receiving ones. DeSean Jackson and Lavelle Hawkins also scored on receiving touchdowns. Oregon State quarterback Matt Moore had 187 passing yards before being replaced in the fourth quarter.

This win propelled the Bears four spots in the AP Poll to #16, and shot them up three spots in the Coaches Poll to #17. Their record stood at 4–1, with a 2–0 Pac-10 record, while the Beavers left with a 2–2 record, 0–1 in the Pac-10.

With a looming game against the undefeated Oregon Ducks, Coach Tedford confessed that he would "immediately" begin thinking about the showdown.

Despite the blowout, the Beavers finished the season with a 10–4 record, and third in the Pac-10 thanks to a 7–3 conference record, a win in the 2006 Sun Bowl over Missouri, and would score a memorable upset over the former #3 USC Trojans several weeks after the Cal loss.

=== Oregon ===
	1	2	3	4	Total
No. 11 Ducks	3	7	7	7	24
No. 16 Golden Bears	14	14	10	7	45

Cal played the next Saturday, October 7, for California's Homecoming weekend, against the undefeated #11 (in both the AP Poll and Coaches Poll) Oregon Ducks, a team that was 4–0, and 1–0 in Pac-10 play. It was broadcast to the majority of the country on ABC Sports. The game at California Memorial Stadium was played in front of a sold-out crowd of 72,516. Surprisingly, Cal came into the game wearing gold jerseys, instead of their normal blue outfits. Before the game, the Cal student section gave a raucous tribute to Nobel Prize winner George Smoot, who had just won a few days earlier for his research on the Big Bang.

Cal continued to shine in its victory over the Ducks. Quarterback Nate Longshore had a touchdown pass early in the first quarter, but the Ducks bounced back with a field goal. Cal then scored three straight touchdowns, two being passes from Longshore, and one being a memorable 65-yard punt return by receiver DeSean Jackson to put the Bears up 28–3. Oregon scored a touchdown before the half ended, leaving Cal with a 28–10 lead. A field goal and another Longshore touchdown into receiver Robert Jordan's hands gave the Bears a 38–10 lead, but the Ducks countered with a touchdown pass as the third quarter ended. Another touchdown score by both teams in the fourth quarter, Cal's coming from tailback Justin Forsett's 23-yard run, gave the Bears an impressive 45–24 victory.

This was the fifth straight game in which the Bears scored more than 40 points. Longshore was 14 for 26 with 189 yards, four touchdowns (including one on the ground), and one interception. While Lynch was held to just 50 yards because of an ankle injury, Justin Forsett rushed for 163 yards on 27 carries, with one score. DeSean Jackson had two touchdowns, one passing and one 65-yard punt return. Receivers Craig Stevens and Robert Jordan also had touchdown receptions. Oregon quarterback Dennis Dixon threw for 263 yards, two touchdowns, and three interceptions. Running back Jonathan Stewart, the then-leader in Pac-10 rushing yards, was held to just 25 yards on 18 carries by the Cal defense.

This game put Cal in the prime position to challenge USC for the Pac-10 championship. Cal moved up six spots in both the AP Poll and the Coaches Poll to #10 and #11, respectively, after this win, while Oregon dropped seven spots in both polls to #18.

The Ducks finished the season with a 7–6 record (4-5 in the Pac-10).

=== Washington State ===
	1	2	3	4	Total
No. 10 Golden Bears	14	7	0	0	21
Cougars	0	3	0	0	3

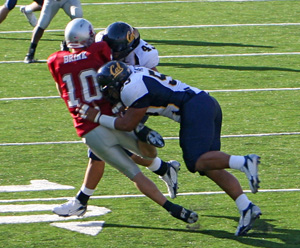
Cal defenders sack Washington State quarterback Alex Brink.

One week later, Cal traveled to Pullman, Washington to battle the Washington State Cougars at Martin Stadium. The Bears had not won in Pullman since 1979, losing nine straight games. The Cougars sported a 4–2 record, 2–1 in the Pac-10, only falling to the then-AP ranked #4 Auburn Tigers and to the then-AP ranked #3 USC Trojans in a very close contest.

Rather than a blowout victory using the offense, the Bears won this game using defense. Three touchdowns were scored in the first half, two from Marshawn Lynch and one rushing touchdown by quarterback Nate Longshore, and the Cougars were held to just a field goal. After the half, the Bears buckled down on defense and didn't allow the Cougars to score again. Washington State had an opportunity to score in the third quarter, but an official review ruled receiver Dwight Tardy's knee was down on the 1-yard line. On fourth and one, the Bears defense stopped the rush to turn the ball over on downs. A quiet second half gave Cal its six straight win, 21–3. They left with a 6–1 record, and an unblemished 4–0 Pac-10 tally. The Cougars fell to 4–3, 2–2 in the Pac-10.

Longshore threw for 176 yards and two interceptions, along with one rushing touchdown. Marshawn Lynch had 152 yards on 25 carries with Cal's two other scores. Receivers DeSean Jackson and Robert Jordan gathered 60 and 56 yards, respectively. This was the first game of the season Jackson did not score a touchdown. Daymeion Hughes got his sixth interception of the season that set up one of Lynch's touchdowns. The Cal defense stifled the Cougars running game to just 88 yards. The offensive line also kept the Cougars, who led the nation in quarterback sacks with 27, at bay, only letting them sack Longshore once.

After Cal's offense had been in full throttle for five straight games, many began to wonder if the Bears were beginning to struggle. The Bears fell one spot in the AP Poll to #11, and stayed constant at #11 in the Coaches Poll after this win. In the first BCS Standings of the season, released the next day, the Bears sported a #10 position.

The game was not broadcast in the Bay Area, angering many Cal fans. However, Slingbox gave fans an opportunity to watch the game at California Memorial Stadium. After a successful test the day before, over 3,000 fans crammed into Memorial Stadium to watch as Slingbox streamed the game from Washington to the large television in the stadium.

=== Washington ===
Washington Huskies (4–3) at #11 California Golden Bears (6–1)

Quarter	1	2	3	4	OT	Total
Washington	3	7	0	14	0	24
No. 11 California	0	3	10	11	7	31

at California Memorial Stadium • Berkeley, California

- Date: October 21
- Game time: 12:30 p.m. PDT
- Game weather: Clear • 73 °F (23 °C) • Wind
- Game attendance: 58,534
- Referee: Dave Cutaia
- Box Score

Game information

Washington

- Carl Bonnell
  17/31, 284 yds, 2 TD, 5 int
- Louis Rankin
  22 rush, 88 yds
- Anthony Russo
  3 rec, 91 yds, TD

California

- Nate Longshore
  21/36, 291 yds
- Marshawn Lynch
  21 rush, 150 yds, 2 TD
- Lavelle Hawkins
  6 rec, 99 yds

58,534 people piled into California Memorial Stadium on October 21 to watch Cal play the Washington Huskies. The Huskies, expected to finish last in the Pac-10 at the beginning of the season, exceeded that prediction, starting the season 4–1. Two straight losses, one a near-upset of the USC Trojans at Los Angeles Memorial Coliseum, and the other a shocker against Oregon State, swayed their momentum a bit, yielding a 4–3 record, 2–2 in the Pac-10. Coach Tyrone Willingham had already doubled the Huskies previous year's win total. The Bears were the clear favorite to win the game, but some predicted that the Huskies could provide a "trap game" for the Bears.

Backup Washington quarterback Carl Bonnell subbed in for the injured starting quarterback Isaiah Stanback. The Huskies struck first, driving down field to get a 33-yard field goal. In the second quarter, Bonnell pitched a 49-yard pass to receiver Anthony Russo to give the Huskies a 10–0 lead. After scoring 192 points in their last six games, the Bears only managed a half-ending field goal from Tom Schneider to end the half with Washington up 10–3.

In Cal's first possession of the second half, they drove the ball 62 yards down field, capping it off with Justin Forsett running in for a touchdown. Later in the third quarter, Schneider made a 50-yard field goal to give the Bears their first lead of the game, 13–10. The Huskies did not stay down for long, starting the fourth quarter with Bonnell rushing seven yards for a score. Cal tried to respond, but only got a field goal, leaving them one point behind. After a defensive stop, quarterback Nate Longshore on the last drive of regulation went 82 yards in 12 plays as the game winded down, converting two third-and-tens. Marshawn Lynch ran in 17 yards for the score, with Justin Forsett managed to rush in for the two-point conversion, giving the Bears a 24–17 lead with 1:52 to go. Cal seemed safe, but Bonnell kept pushing upfield on the Huskies possession, and capped it off with a 40-yard Hail Mary pass, batted off the hands of three Cal defenders into the hands of receiver Marlon Wood as the clock ran to zero.

Cal was on offense first in overtime. On the second play, Longshore passed back to Lynch, who ran 22 yards in for the touchdown. On Washington's possession, Cal defender Desmond Bishop intercepted a pass at the goal line and returned it 82 yards to the Washington 17, Cal's fifth interception of the game, giving the Bears a heart stopping 31–24 victory.

Marshawn Lynch jubilantly took a cart used to drive injured players off the field for a joyride in the middle of the stadium following the win. He gathered 150 yards on 21 carries, while sporting two sprained ankles. Longshore was 21 for 36 with 291 yards. Bonnell passed for 284 yards, but the five interceptions proved too costly. Bishop later said of the victory, "We know we can win big games now. We know it's inside us."

In a weekend full of near upsets of the Texas Longhorns, Notre Dame, and the Tennessee Volunteers, the Bears dropped one spot in both polls to #12, but stayed at #10 in the BCS Rankings. The Bears now had a 7–1 record, with a perfect 5–0 Pac-10 record. Washington dropped its third straight, falling to 4–4, 2–3 in the Pac-10.

The Washington Huskies would finish 5–7, 3–6 in the Pac-10.

Scoring summary

Quarter	Time	Drive			Team	Scoring information	Score	
Quarter	Time	Plays	Yards	TOP	Team	Scoring information	WASH	CAL
1	9:42	8	44	3:53	Washington	33-yard field goal by Michael Braunstein	3	0
2	0:47	3	68	0:59	Washington	Anthony Russo 49-yard touchdown reception from Carl Bonnell, Michael Braunstein kick good	10	0
2	0:02	4	54	0:45	California	21-yard field goal by Tom Schneider	10	3
3	10:31	6	62	3:00	California	Justin Forsett 1-yard touchdown run, Tom Schneider kick good	10	10
3	4:41	8	46	3:27	California	50-yard field goal by Tom Schneider	10	13
4	14:13	5	86	1:22	Washington	Carl Bonnell 7-yard touchdown run, Michael Braunstein kick good	17	13
4	10:21	9	68	3:52	California	29-yard field goal by Tom Schneider	17	16
4	1:52	12	82	4:58	California	Marshawn Lynch 17-yard touchdown run, 2-point run good	17	24
4	0:00	13	72	1:52	Washington	Marlon Wood 40-yard touchdown reception from Carl Bonnell, Michael Braunstein kick good	24	24
OT		2	25		California	Marshawn Lynch 22-yard touchdown run, Tom Schneider kick good	24	31
"TOP" = time of possession. For other American football terms, see Glossary of American football.							24	31

=== UCLA ===
	1	2	3	4	Total
Bruins	0	10	0	14	24
No. 10 Golden Bears	7	7	14	10	38

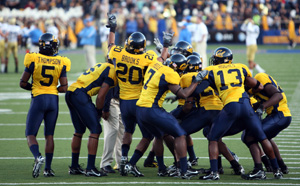
The Cal secondary prior to the game

After a bye week, which saw the Bears take sole position of first place in the Pac-10, rising two spots in the AP Poll to #10 and one spot in the Coaches Poll to #11 (staying steady at #10 in the BCS Standings), Cal faced the UCLA Bruins, a Pac-10 team and rival of the Bears, who sported a 4–4 record, 2–3 in the Pac-10. Last year, in a contest between the unbeaten, ranked teams at the Rose Bowl, the Bears fell to the Bruins 47–40, letting their 40–28 lead in the fourth quarter melt away.

The Bruins starting quarterback Ben Olson was still injured, so backup quarterback Patrick Cowan took his fourth start in California Memorial Stadium. The Bruins had a tough last three weeks after starting 4–1, losing to the Oregon Ducks on the road, losing their chance at an upset over the #10 Notre Dame Fighting Irish in the last minute of the game at Notre Dame Stadium, and losing at home to the Washington State Cougars at home 37–15. The Bears and Bruins have split their last six contests, with the home team winning each occasion.

Cal wore their gold jerseys from the Oregon game four weeks earlier in front of a sold-out crowd of 72,516, Cal's second of the year, and just their fifth from opponents besides Stanford since the 1950s. In the first quarter, Cal drove down the field to score on their first possession of the ballgame. A defensive stop against UCLA and then the Bears gave the Bruins possession, and Cowan ran in for a twelve-yard touchdown. Quarterback Nate Longshore took the helm, driving 76 yards on the next possession, the drive capped off by Marshawn Lynch's brilliant 24-yard catch-and-dash through the UCLA defense. The Bruins drove deep in the next drive, but settled for a field goal, which ended the first half scoring.

On an early third-quarter possession of Cal, Longshore threw to receiver Robert Jordan for a 44-yard touchdown. After UCLA's failed drive, DeSean Jackson, aided by a devastating block by Thomas DeCoud, returned the ensuing punt 72 yards for a touchdown, putting the Bears up 28–10. It was the fourth punt return for touchdown in Jackson's career, tying a Pac-10 record. Lynch ran in for another touchdown early in the fourth quarter. UCLA hauled in two more touchdowns, including a 70-yard run from Chris Markey, while Cal could only get off a field goal. This propelled the Bears to their eighth straight win over the Bruins, 38–24.

Longshore was 20-for-24 with 266 yards and three touchdowns. Lynch ran for 81 yards and a touchdown, and had 45 receiving yards along with another touchdown. Receiver Robert Jordan, Lynch's second cousin, had 86 receiving yards and two touchdowns on 5 catches. Lavelle Hawkins and DeSean Jackson had 60 and 58 receiving yards on 5 and 3 catches, respectively. Backup running back Justin Forsett also ran for 60 yards on just 11 carries. Desmond Bishop and Daymeion Hughes both had interceptions off of Cowan. Hughes's eighth is the current conference best. Cowan threw for 329 yards and was 22-for-40 with the two interceptions. UCLA had 516 total yards, compared to Cal's 433.

The Bears' win gave them an 8–1 record, 6–0 in the Pac-10. They saw a two spot rise in the AP Poll to #8, and another two spot rise in the Coaches Poll to #9. They are also #8 in the BCS standings, increasing two spots from the previous week.

The Bruins are now 5–5, 3–4 in the Pac-10, on the verge of bowl eligibility.

=== Arizona ===
	1	2	3	4	Total
No. 8 Golden Bears	10	7	0	3	20
Wildcats	3	0	7	14	24

Cal travelled to Tucson, Arizona Saturday to battle the Arizona Wildcats. The AP ranked #8 Golden Bears went into the game with an 8–1 record, and 6–0 in Pac-10. The Wildcats were 4–5, 2–4 in the Pac-10, coming off of an upset of the then-ranked Washington State Cougars at Pullman the week before. Quarterback Willie Tuitama missed two previous games due to a concussion, and went back in against the Cougars, passing for 159 yards. Junior running back Chris Henry had perhaps the biggest day, running for 94 yards and two touchdowns on a school-record 35 carries. Cal has blanked the Wildcats in their last two meetings, 28–0 last year in Berkeley and in 2004 at Tucson, 38–0. Despite a looming, much-anticipated showdown against the USC Trojans at Los Angeles Memorial Coliseum on November 18 that will probably decide the Pac-10 championship, Cal quarterback Nate Longshore insisted that they were solely focused on the Wildcats this week.

A 95-yard punt return by DeSean Jackson was the first score, putting the Bears up 7–0. Arizona got a field goal next, putting them on the board 7–3. Midway through the first quarter, Marshawn Lynch's 79-yard touchdown run was erased by a block-in-the-back call on Lavelle Hawkins, and the Bears had to settle for a field goal. In the middle of the second quarter, Longshore hit Jackson with a 72-yard touchdown pass to put the Bears up 17–3 at the half.

Arizona would drive the clock down on two drives in the second half and get a touchdown on both drives to tie the game at 17. Within the span of three plays on the second of these drives, Cal had two interceptions by Bernard Hicks and Daymeion Hughes nullified by two separate penalties. Hughes later argued that his case should not have given him a pass interference call, as he was just reaching for the ball. On Cal's next drive, with the score now tied, Longshore threw and the ball was intercepted by Arizona's Antoine Cason for another score, putting the Wildcats up 24–17.

The Bears would respond in their next series with a long pass to Lavelle Hawkins, but he would trip inside the 5-yard line before reaching the goal. Cal could not capitalize, having to put up a field goal, earning them a four-point deficit 24–20. A stop on the Arizona defense gave the Bears the ball again. Longshore apparently hit Jackson for a 63-yard score with just over two minutes left, but a video review ruled his foot out at the 41-yard line. A few plays later, Longshore's pass was batted and intercepted with less than two minutes to clinch the game for Arizona. The student section wildly rushed the field as Cal was taken out of the national title picture for the season.

While Cal out gained the Wildcats in yardage 356 to 262, and though Longshore passed for 250 yards, his three interceptions turned quite costly, as did all of Cal's penalties on crucial plays. Despite their 17–3 mid-third quarter lead, the Bears just made too many mistakes. Hughes later reflected on the loss, "The whole game was like plays going their way."

Cal fell to 8–2, 6–1 in the Pac-10 after this loss, and fell nine spots to #17 in the AP Poll, and eight spots in the Coaches Poll to #17. Their BCS ranking decreased seven spots to #15. Despite the upset, they still had a chance to clinch their Rose Bowl bid with a win against the conference leading USC Trojans the next week.

Arizona would finish 6–6, 4–5 in the Pac-10, but despite being eligible, would not be picked for a bowl game.

=== USC ===
	1	2	3	4	Total
No. 17 Golden Bears	2	7	0	0	9
No. 4 Trojans	3	3	3	14	23

In one of the most important Pac-10 games of the season, Cal traveled to Los Angeles to battle the USC Trojans at the Los Angeles Memorial Coliseum. A victory by either side would ensure a BCS berth for that team, since the winner would be crowned champion of the Pac-10 because they would hold the tiebreaker over the other. While the previous week's loss knocked Cal from the talks of hunting for the national title, a victory would have ensured its first Rose Bowl berth since 1959.

USC had higher aspirations; they were aiming for their third trip to the BCS National Championship Game, and with Michigan's loss to Ohio State earlier, a sweep of their final three games would guarantee them the #2 seed and a date with the Buckeyes. A win against Cal would at the very least clinch the Rose Bowl.

The Trojans and Bears would struggle to a standstill for three quarters. The Golden Bears would take a 9–6 lead into halftime thanks to a safety by Brandon Mebane and a TD throw from Nate Longshore to Lavelle Hawkins, although the margin could have been bigger if not for two turnovers in USC territory. The Trojans would score one field goal in each of the three quarters to tie the game at 9.

In the fourth quarter, USC would break the game open. Two touchdown passes on two consecutive drives from John David Booty to Dwayne Jarrett and Steve Smith respectively provided the game's final scoring. Just as critical was USC's defense shutting down Cal's offense in the second half, allowing only four first downs. USC clinched its fifth consecutive Pac-10 title and at least a trip to the Rose Bowl.

Booty struggled in the first half, but went 13 for 19 for 168 yards and 2 touchdowns in the second. Jarrett and Smith combined for 11 catches and 154 yards and the aforementioned two scores. For Cal, Marshawn Lynch was held to 88 yards on 20 carries, and Longshore went 17–38, throwing for 1 touchdown but also 2 interceptions. The Bears would go into Thanksgiving weekend (their traditional bye week) needing to win The Big Game to wrap up their second Holiday Bowl bid in three years.

Despite the victory, the Trojans would be upset by UCLA in the last week of the season to ruin their BCS title aspirations. This opened the door for the Florida Gators, who beat the Arkansas Razorbacks in the 2006 SEC Championship Game to claim a spot in the 2007 BCS National Championship Game against Ohio State. USC would go on to the Rose Bowl, where they would defeat Big Ten runner-up and BCS-ranked #3 Michigan 32–18. The Trojans would finish the season 11–2 and 7–2 in the Pac-10, ranked 4th in both the AP and Coaches Polls.

=== Stanford ===
	1	2	3	4	Total
Cardinal	0	10	7	0	17
No. 21 Golden Bears	3	10	10	3	26

After being defeated by USC two weeks previous, Cal faced their rivals the Stanford Cardinal in the 109th Big Game. It was not a particularly strong performance from the Bears, who only had one offensive touchdown. Nate Longshore threw for 217 yards and one score against a Cardinal defense that had tried their best to stop the California offense. Both Marshawn Lynch and Justin Forsett were held under 100 yards against a defense that was once the worst in the entire NCAA that season.

However, Tom Schneider kicked four field goals (including tying a school record with a 55 yarder in swirling winds) and Syd'Quan Thompson picked up a fumble recovery for a late first half score, and that was just enough for the Bears to stave off a strong performance from T.J. Ostrander and the hapless one win Cardinal squad. Pac-10 defense stats

Since Cal defeated Stanford, and USC was defeated by UCLA the same day, Cal got its first share of the Pac-10 Title since 1975, with Cal and USC both atop the Pac-10 in the final standings. Because USC beat Cal though, the Trojans would be heading to the Rose Bowl while the Golden Bears had to settle for San Diego and the Holiday Bowl.

Stanford finished 1–11, 1–8 in the conference and fired their head coach Walt Harris after the season was over. He was replaced by Jim Harbaugh.

=== Holiday Bowl ===
Team	1	2	3	4	Total
No. 21 Texas A&M	7	3	0	0	10
• No. 20 California	7	7	14	17	45

- Date: December 28
- Location: Qualcomm Stadium, San Diego, CA
- Game start: 8:00 p.m. EST

Scoring summary
Q1	TA&M	Schroeder 19 yard pass from McGee (Szymanski kick)	TA&M 7–0
Q1	CAL	Longshore 1 yard run (Schneider kick)	Tie 7–7
Q2	CAL	Lynch 2 yard run (Schneider kick)	CAL 14–7
Q2	TA&M	Szymanski 32 yard field goal	CAL 14–10
Q3	CAL	Lynch 2 yard run (Schneider kick)	CAL 21–10
Q3	CAL	Hawkins 3 yard pass from Longshore (Schneider kick)	CAL 28–10
Q4	CAL	Schneider 21 yard field goal	CAL 31–10
Q4	CAL	Forsett 7 yard run (Schneider kick)	CAL 38–10
Q4	CAL	Schutte 3 yard run (Schneider kick)	CAL 45–10

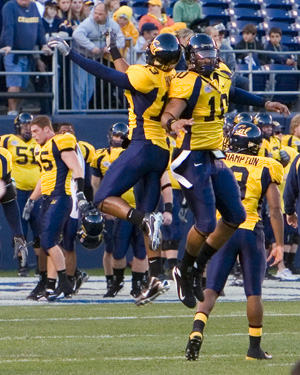
Daymeion Hughes (left) and Lynch celebrate during the Holiday Bowl

Lynch rushed for 111 yards and two touchdowns while the Golden Bears defense was able to hold the Aggie offense to a scoreless second half. Longshore threw for a touchdown, rushed for one, but also threw an interception while passing for 231 yards in the Golden Bear win. Justin Forsett also ran for 125 yards and scored once himself.

== Roster ==
(as of 9/20/2006)
Quarterbacks: 8 Kyle Reed – Sophomore; 9 Nate Longshore – Junior; 13 Kevin Riley – Sophomore; 14 Cory Smits – Sophomore; 16 Bryan Van Meter – Junior; 17 Taylor Tedford – (redshirt) Freshman; Running backs: 10 Marshawn Lynch – Junior; 20 Justin Forsett – Junior; 21 James Montgomery – (redshirt) Freshman; 22 Tracy Slocum – (redshirt) Freshman; 34 Bryan Schutte – Sophomore; Fullbacks: 23 Will Ta'ufo'ou – Junior; 32 R.J. Garrett – (redshirt) Freshman; 33 Brian Holley – Sophomore; Wide receivers: 1 DeSean Jackson – Junior; 5 Noah Smith – Senior; 7 Lavelle Hawkins – Senior; 11 Robert Jordan – Senior; 19 Jeremy Ross – Sophomore; 46 Cooper Miller – Sophomore; 48 Gavin Beeman – (redshirt) Freshman; 80 Daniel Lofton – (redshirt) Freshman; 81 Cameron Toler – (redshirt) Freshman; 84 Drew Glover – Junior; 85 LaReylle Cunningham – Junior; 86 Sam DeSa – Senior; 87 Alex Stroud – Junior; 88 Sean Young – Senior; 12 Stefon Jackman – Freshman	Tight ends: 6 Cameron Morrah – Sophomore; 45 Julian Arthur – Senior; 82 Craig Stevens – Senior; 89 Garry Graffort – (redshirt) Freshman; Offensive linemen: 50 Kevin Bemoll – (redshirt) Freshman; 51 Alex Mack – Junior; 53 Mike Gibson – Senior; 54 Chris Guarnero – (redshirt) Freshman; 55 Noris Malele – Junior; 56 Dan Lopez – (redshirt) Freshman; 58 Chet Teofilo – Junior; 63 Brian De La Puente – Senior; 70 Mark Boskovich – (redshirt) Freshman; 73 Richard Fisher – (redshirt) Freshman; 76 Matt Laird – (redshirt) Freshman; 77 Michael Costanzo – (redshirt) Freshman; 77 Mark Gray – Senior; 78 Justin Prueitt – (redshirt) Freshman; 79 Mike Tepper – Junior	Defensive ends: 57 Keith Browner – (redshirt) Freshman; 91 Cody Jones – Sophomore; 92 Tad Smith – Sophomore; 94 Rulon Davis – Junior; 99 Phillip Mbakogu – Senior; Defensive tackles: 69 Matthew Malele – Senior; 76 Derrick Hill – Sophomore; 90 Tyson Alualu – Sophomore; 93 John Allen – Senior; 95 Jonathan Karacozoff – Sophomore; 98 Mike Kane – Junior; Linebackers: 1 Worrell Williams – Junior; 10 Desmond Bishop – Senior; 15 Anthony Felder – Junior; 16 Justin Moye – Senior; 18 Michael Mohamed – (redshirt) freshman; 19 Eric Morrah – Senior; 33 Matt Russi – Sophomore; 42 Shea McIntyre – Sophomore; 44 Chris Purtz – Senior; 47 Kyle Kirst – Sophomore; 55 Greg Van Hoesen – Senior; 56 Zack Follett – Junior; 88 Eddie Young – Sophomore	Defensive backs: 2 Bernard Hicks – Junior; 3 Brandon Hampton – Senior; 4 Thomas DeCoud – Senior; 5 Syd'Quan Thompson – Sophomore; 6 Gary Doxy – Sophomore; 7 Robert Peele – Sophomore; 13 Daymeion Hughes – Senior; 20 Jesse Brooks – Sophomore; 22 Tim Mixon – Senior; 24 Brandon Jones – (redshirt) freshman; 25 Brett Johnson – Sophomore; 26 Darian Hagan – (redshirt) freshman; 27 Charles Amadi – (redshirt) freshman; 28 Kenny Frank – Senior; 29 Marcus Ezeff – Sophomore; Kickers: 14 Nick Demopoulos – (redshirt) freshman; 15 Tom Schneider – Senior; 30 Joe Robles – (redshirt) freshman; 34 Jordan Kay – Junior; Punters: 11 Andrew Larson – Senior; 41 Scott Wingert – Senior; Long snappers: 68 Nick Sundberg – Junior

== Player recognition ==
Player, position	Recognition
Daymeion Hughes, CB	• First Team All-American: AP, AFCA, ESPN.com, Rivals.com, SI.com, Scout.com • Pac-10 Defensive Player of the Year • Lott Trophy Recipient • First Team All-Pac-10
DeSean Jackson, PR	• First Team All-American: AP, FWAA, ESPN.com, Rivals.com, SI.com, Scout.com • Honorable Mention All-American: SI.com • Randy Moss Award Winner • First Team All-Pac-10 • Pac-10 Special Teams Player of the Week 11/6
Marshawn Lynch	• First Team All-American:RB: AFCA • Second Team All-American: Rivals.com • Honorable Mention: SI.com • Pac-10 Offensive Player of the Year • First Team All-Pac-10 • Pac-10 Offensive Player of the Week 10/23
Desmond Bishop, LB	• Third Team All-American: Rivals.com
Brandon Mebane, DT	• Third Team All-American: Rivals.com: Rivals.com
Alex Mack, OL	• First Team All-Pac-10 • ESPN The Magazine Academic All-District • Pac-10 Second Team All-Academic
Mike Gibson, OL	• Second Team All-Pac-10
Andrew Larson, P	• Second Team All-Pac-10
Craig Stevens, TE	• Second Team All-Pac-10
Byron Storer, ST	• Second Team All-Pac-10 • ESPN The Magazine Academic All-District • Pac-10 First Team All-Academic
Nu'u Tafisi, DL	• Second Team All-Pac-10
Andrew Cameron, OL	• Honorable Mention All-Pac-10
Zack Follett, LB	• Honorable Mention All-Pac-10
Lavelle Hawkins, WR	• Honorable Mention All-Pac-10
Robert Jordan, WR	• Honorable Mention All-Pac-10
Nate Longshore, QB	• Honorable Mention All-Pac-10
Mickey Pimentel, LB	• Honorable Mention All-Pac-10
Vincent Drake, LB	• Honorable Mention All-Pac-10
Erik Robertson, OL	• Honorable Mention All-Pac-10
Randy Bundy, DB	• Pac-10 First Team All-Academic
John Allen, DL	• Pac-10 Second Team All-Academic
Greg Van Hoesen, LB	• Pac-10 Second Team All-Academic
Noris Malele, OL	• Pac-10 Honorable Mention All-Academic
Erik Robertson, OL	• Pac-10 Honorable Mention All-Academic
Scott Smith, OL	• Pac-10 Honorable Mention All-Academic
Syd'Quan Thompson, DB	• Pac-10 All-Freshman Team: Sporting News, Scout.com
Nate Longshore, QB	• Pac-10 Offensive Player of the Week 9/11, 9/27, 11/6 • USA Today National Player Of The Week 9/25
Tom Schneider, PK	• Pac-10 Special Teams Player of the Week 10/2, 12/4
Justin Forsett, RB	• Pac-10 Offensive Player of the Week 10/9

=== Team awards ===
- Bear Backer Award (Most Valuable Player – voted on by the team): Marshawn Lynch (offense); Daymeion Hughes (defense)
- Dink Artal Award (Player Best Exemplifying Cal Spirit): Byron Storer/Mickey Pimentel
- Ken Harvey Award (Academic Commitment & Improvement): Marcus O'Keith
- Frank J. Schlessinger Coaches Award (Athletic, Academic, Community): Scott Smith
- Ken Cotton Award (Most Courageous Player): Andrew Cameron/Steve Kelly
- Everett Merriman Award (Community Service): Eric Beegun
- Stub Allison Award (Most Inspirational Player): Desmond Bishop
- Joe Roth Award (Courage, Attitude & Sportsmanship): Nu'u Tafisi
- Andy Smith Award (Most Big C Playing Time): Daymeion Hughes
- Senior Lifter of the Year: Byron Storer
- Freshman Lifter of the Year: James Montgomery
- Scout Team Player of Year: Chris Guarnero, Jeremy Ross (co-offense), Charles Amadi, Kyle Kirst (co-defense), Brian Holley (special teams)
- Berkeley Breakfast Club Award (Outstanding Big Game Player): Tom Schneider
- Bob Tessier Award (Most Improved Lineman): Alex Mack (offense); Abu Ma'afala (defense)
- Most Improved Player: Thomas DeCoud
- Bob Simmons Award (Most Valuable Freshman): Syd'Quan Thompson
- Most Valuable Back: Marshawn Lynch (running back); Daymeion Hughes (defensive back)
- J. Scott Duncan Award (Most Valuable Special Teams Player): DeSean Jackson/Byron Storer
- Cal Coaches Award : Tim Mixon
- Brick Muller Award (Most Valuable Lineman): Brandon Mebane (defense); Erik Robertson (offense)
- Cort Majors Captains Award (Team Captains): Craig Stevens (offense); Desmond Bishop (defense)
