= 2006 Arizona Wildcats football team =

American college football season

2006 Arizona Wildcats football
- Conference: Pacific-10
- Record: 6–6 (4–5 Pac-10)
- Head coach: Mike Stoops (3rd season)
- Offensive coordinator: Mike Canales (3rd season)
- Offensive scheme: Pro-style
- Defensive coordinator: Mark Stoops (3rd season)
- Base defense: 4–3
- Home stadium: Arizona Stadium

2006 Pacific-10 Conference football standings
	Conf.			Overall
Team	W		L	W		L
No. 4 USC +	7	–	2	11	–	2
No. 14 California +	7	–	2	10	–	3
No. 21 Oregon State	6	–	3	10	–	4
UCLA	5	–	4	7	–	6
Arizona State	4	–	5	7	–	6
Oregon	4	–	5	7	–	6
Arizona	4	–	5	6	–	6
Washington State	4	–	5	6	–	6
Washington	3	–	6	5	–	7
Stanford	1	–	8	1	–	11
+ – Conference co-champions; Rankings from AP Poll

The 2006 Arizona Wildcats football team represented the University of Arizona during the 2006 NCAA Division I FBS football season. They were coached by Mike Stoops in his third season with the Wildcats. The team completed the season with a record of 6–6 (4–5 against Pac-10 opponents), which was their first non-losing season since 1999 and an improvement from Stoops’ first two seasons.

The Wildcats would earn another November upset victory, when they defeated California, that became the team's top moment of the year. Despite finishing the season with six wins (which would have made them eligible for the postseason), the Wildcats did not earn an invitation to a bowl game, perhaps due to having a losing conference record.

== Schedule ==
Date	Time	Opponent	Site	TV	Result	Attendance
September 2	7:15 p.m.	BYU*	Arizona Stadium; Tucson, AZ	TBS	W 16–13	58,450
September 9	3:30 p.m.	at No. 8 LSU*	Tiger Stadium; Baton Rouge, LA	ESPN2	L 3–45	92,221
September 16	7:00 p.m.	Stephen F. Austin*	Arizona Stadium; Tucson, AZ	FSNAZ	W 28–10	47,402
September 23	5:00 p.m.	No. 3 USC	Arizona Stadium; Tucson, AZ	ABC	L 3–20	58,801
September 30	7:00 p.m.	Washington	Arizona Stadium; Tucson, AZ	FSNAZ	L 10–21	55,409
October 7	4:00 p.m.	at UCLA	Rose Bowl; Pasadena, CA	FSN	L 7–27	65,644
October 14	2:00 p.m.	at Stanford	Stanford Stadium; Stanford, CA	FSN	W 20–7	39,317
October 21	4:00 p.m.	Oregon State	Arizona Stadium; Tucson, AZ	FSN	L 10–17	57,113
November 4	3:00 p.m.	at No. 25 Washington State	Martin Stadium; Pullman, WA	FSN	W 27–17	35,117
November 11	1:30 p.m.	No. 8 California^{†}	Arizona Stadium; Tucson, AZ	ABC	W 24–20	55,519
November 18	1:30 p.m.	at Oregon	Autzen Stadium; Eugene, OR	FSN	W 37–10	58,029
November 25	4:00 p.m.	Arizona State	Arizona Stadium; Tucson, AZ (Territorial Cup)	FSN	L 14–28	57,895
*Non-conference game; ^{†}Homecoming; Rankings from AP Poll released prior to the game; All times are in Mountain time

== Game summaries ==
=== BYU ===
	1	2	3	4	Total
BYU	7	0	3	3	13
Arizona	3	3	7	3	16

The Wildcats began the season by hosting BYU in the opener. It was the first meeting between the two schools since 1977, when they were members of the WAC (the year before Arizona joined the Pac-10).

The Wildcats’ defense would come up big early, as they recovered a BYU fumble on its opening possession, which led to a field goal that put Arizona on the board for their first points of the season. However, later in the quarter, the Cougars answered back with a touchdown to take the lead. The Wildcats would add another field goal for the only points of the second quarter to get within 7–6 at halftime.

In the second half, the Cougars forced an Arizona turnover and cashed in on a field goal that extended their lead to 10–6. The Wildcats responded as they drove down the field and got a touchdown to retake the lead at 13–10. After both teams’ defenses dominated most of the fourth quarter, BYU was able to come through and tied the game with a field goal with under five minutes remaining. However, on the Wildcats’ next drive, they moved the ball into field goal range that took up most of the remainder of the clock. In the closing seconds, Arizona attempted a field goal and would successfully convert the kick to win it and begin the year at 1–0. The game was full of dominance by the defense of both teams, which led to a low-scoring matchup, but Arizona did enough to get their first win over BYU since 1975 and their first at home since 1972.

=== LSU ===
	1	2	3	4	Total
Arizona	0	0	0	3	3
LSU	17	7	14	7	45

Arizona went on their first road trip of the year and played LSU in Baton Rouge, which is known to be a difficult place for opponents. The eighth-ranked Tigers would dominate the Wildcats with a great offense and blitzing defense, with Arizona only scoring on field goal late in the fourth quarter. As a result, the Wildcats suffered another blowout loss to the Tigers, as they did in 2003, and their record dropped to 1–1.

=== Stephen F. Austin ===
	1	2	3	4	Total
Stephen F. Austin	0	10	0	0	10
Arizona	7	7	0	14	28

Arizona returned home to face Stephen F. Austin, a small Division I FCS school. A close game throughout, with the Wildcats leading 14–10 after three quarters and the Lumberjacks having a chance at an upset, Arizona, however, scored twice in the fourth quarter to break open the game and ended any hope of an upset by SFA. The win moved the Wildcats to 2–1 before the start of conference play. To date, this is Arizona's first and only meeting against SFA.

=== USC ===
	1	2	3	4	Total
USC	0	3	7	10	20
Arizona	0	0	0	3	3

In their conference opener, the Wildcats hosted third-ranked USC, who, at the time, was the toughest Pac-10 team to beat, and had not lost to a conference opponent since 2003. For most of the game, Arizona's defense would hold USC's offense in check, though their offense heavily struggled against the Trojans’ revamped defense. The Wildcats only trailed 3–0 at the half before the Trojans began to find a rhythm in the second half with a touchdown. Arizona finally got on the board with a field goal early in the fourth quarter that shrunk the Trojan lead to seven. However, USC lived up to its top-five ranking by adding ten more points in the quarter to ice the game for a 20–3 victory and dropped the Wildcats’ record to 2–2.

=== Washington ===
	1	2	3	4	Total
Washington	0	21	0	0	21
Arizona	0	3	7	0	10

Arizona hosted Washington in their next game. It was the second consecutive year that both the Wildcats and Huskies met in Tucson. After a scoreless first quarter, the Wildcats struck first in the second with a field goal. However, Washington would score 21 unanswered points in the quarter for a halftime lead. The Wildcats would score a touchdown in the third to get within 21–10, but they did not get any closer as their offense sputtered for the rest of the way despite shutting out the Huskies in the entire second half. The loss led to the Wildcats’ record to fall to 2–3.

=== UCLA ===
	1	2	3	4	Total
Arizona	0	7	0	0	7
UCLA	7	7	6	7	27

Arizona traveled to the Rose Bowl to play UCLA, who were looking to avenge their loss to the Wildcats from the previous year, in which Arizona embarrassed the Bruins in Tucson. After a back and forth first half, the Bruins put the game away with a dominant defensive effort as the Wildcats’ struggles on offense continued. In the end, Arizona would leave Pasadena with a losing streak of three games as UCLA got revenge on the Wildcats.

=== Stanford ===
	1	2	3	4	Total
Arizona	14	3	3	0	20
Stanford	0	7	0	0	7

The Wildcats remained on the road and traveled to Stanford to take on a struggling and winless Cardinal team, and believed that it was their best chance at winning. Arizona would rely mostly on a rushing offense and put up points while the defense improved to shut down Stanford. The only mistake that the Wildcats would make was an interception return for a touchdown by the Cardinal in the second quarter that prevented a shutout. The win gave Arizona its third victory of the season as well as its first Pac-10 game, and ended a three-game losing streak.

=== Oregon State ===
	1	2	3	4	Total
Oregon State	14	0	0	3	17
Arizona	0	3	7	0	10

Arizona came back home and hosted Oregon State. The Wildcats defeated the Beavers on the road the previous season and hasn't beaten them at home since 1997. Oregon State would take an early 14–0 lead and the Wildcats had trouble moving the ball though they would get a field goal before halftime. In the third quarter, Arizona made things interesting with a punt return for a touchdown to get within four at 14–10. The Beavers extended their lead to 17–10 with a field goal in the fourth quarter. Arizona tried to respond late, but a pair of interceptions on their final drives would cost them and would lead to their fifth loss and pressure began to be put on Stoops with his job in danger as a result.

=== Washington State ===
Team	1	2	3	4	Total
• Arizona	7	13	7	0	27
Washington State	10	0	7	0	17

- Date: November 4
- Location: Martin Stadium, Pullman, WA
- Game start: 2:00 p.m. MST

Scoring summary
1	13:02	ARIZ	Anthony Johnson 78-yard pass from Willie Tuitama (Nick Folk kick)	Arizona 7-0
1	7:46	WSU	Brandon Gibson 91-yard pass from Alex Brink (Romeen Abdollmohammadi kick)	Tied 7-7
1	4:50	WSU	Abdollmohammadi 37-yard field goal	Wash. St. 10-7
2	13:08	ARIZ	Chris Henry 3-yard run (Folk kick)	Arizona 14-10
2	5:10	ARIZ	Folk 48-yard field goal	Arizona 17-10
2	0:04	ARIZ	Folk 37-yard field goal	Arizona 20-10
3	10:27	WSU	Jed Collins 1-yard run (Abdollmohammadi kick)	Arizona 20-17
3	2:16	ARIZ	Henry 6-yard run (Folk kick)	Arizona 27-17

After the loss to Oregon State that led to rumors of Stoops being on the hot seat, Arizona went back on to the road to face Washington State, who was ranked in the top 25. Although the schedule was getting tougher for the Wildcats, Stoops believed that the team would hang with its opponents.

In the opening quarter, the Cougars led 10–7 after both teams scored long touchdowns. Arizona would put things together with 13 points of their own in the second to lead 20–10 at the half. In the third quarter, Washington State cut into the Wildcat lead with a score before Arizona answered back with a rushing touchdown to go back up ten. Neither team would threaten in the final frame, though it did not matter as the Wildcats would do enough to earn the upset and pick up their fourth win, which was the first time under Stoops that Arizona won more than three games in a season. Also, it was the Wildcats’ first win over the Cougars since 2000 and their first in Pullman since 1999.

=== California ===
	1	2	3	4	Total
California	10	7	0	3	20
Arizona	3	0	7	14	24

On homecoming day, Arizona hosted eighth-ranked California, who was in contention for both the Rose Bowl and a BCS berth. In the first half, the Golden Bears torched the Wildcats with a pair of long touchdowns, with one being on a punt return and the other on a catch and run, for a 17–3 halftime lead, which seemed that hope was lost for the Wildcats. However, in the second half, Arizona would slowly begin to climb back into the game and scored in the third quarter to make it 17–10, and set the stage for a wild fourth quarter.

Early in the quarter, on a drive that was helped by California penalties, the Wildcats scored again to tie it at 17. On Cal's next possession, Arizona returned an interception for another touchdown which gave the Wildcats the lead and sent Arizona Stadium into a frenzy. The Bears tried to respond, but Arizona stopped them near the goal line, and Cal settled for a field goal to cut Arizona's lead to 24–20. Later on, with time running down, Cal would again threaten and appeared to retake the lead with a touchdown, though a replay review overturned the would-be score, which gave the Wildcats yet another break. A few plays later, Arizona would force another interception with over a minute and a half remaining and the Wildcats ran out the clock for the upset victory as fans rushed the field to celebrate the win. It was the second consecutive week that the Wildcats defeated a ranked team and it was also the second straight year in which they upset a top ten-ranked Pac-10 opponent on homecoming weekend in November.

=== Oregon ===
Team	1	2	3	4	Total
• Arizona	14	10	10	3	37
Oregon	3	7	0	0	10

- Date: November 18
- Location: Autzen Stadium, Eugene, OR
- Game start: 12:30 p.m. MST
- Television network: FSN

Scoring summary
1	9:35	ORE	Paul Martinez 27-yard field goal	Oregon 3–0
1	4:06	ARIZ	Chris Henry 15-yard run (Nick Folk kick)	Arizona 7–3
1	:00	ARIZ	Earl Mitchell 37-yard pass from Willie Tuitama (Folk kick)	Arizona 14–3
2	13:18	ORE	Jeremiah Johnson 8-yard run (Martinez kick)	Arizona 14–10
2	6:16	ARIZ	Henry 21-yard pass from Tuitama (Folk kick)	Arizona 21–10
2	:41	ARIZ	Folk 29-yard field goal	Arizona 24–10
3	3:23	ARIZ	Folk 28-yard field goal	Arizona 27–10
3	:08	ARIZ	Henry 61-yard run (Folk kick)	Arizona 34–10
4	11:36	ARIZ	Folk 45-yard field goal	Arizona 37–10

After upsetting California, the Wildcats looked to continue their momentum and traveled to Oregon to face the Ducks in their final road game of the season. After Oregon grabbed an early lead with a field goal, Arizona would answer back with a pair of touchdowns, with the second one on the final play of the opening quarter, to take a 14–3 lead. The Ducks would score a touchdown early in the second quarter to cut into the Wildcats’ lead to 14–10. However, Arizona would score ten more points to increase their lead at the half. The Wildcats would dominate the second half by scoring 13 more points, including three field goals, and using a stout defense to shut down Oregon's offense, as they held the Ducks scoreless in the half, to win 37–10 for their sixth victory of the year as well as their third consecutive win. Also, the win made them at least bowl-eligible and guaranteed them of their first non-losing season since 1999. In addition, it was Arizona's first win in Eugene since 1986 after several near-misses.

=== Arizona State ===
	1	2	3	4	Total
Arizona State	21	0	7	0	28
Arizona	0	14	0	0	14

Arizona returned home to play rival Arizona State in the finale. As both teams had six wins entering the game, the winner would clinch a seventh victory and a postseason spot (with the Wildcats not having done so since 1998).

However, despite pregame hype, things would become difficult for the Wildcats, as the Sun Devils would dominate the first quarter with 21 points. Arizona managed to get back in it with two touchdowns in the second to get within 21–14 before halftime, although they would lose their quarterback with an injury, which made it the second year in a row that it happened against ASU. With a change at quarterback in the second half, it would affect the Wildcats’ offense for the rest of the game, as ASU would score a third-quarter touchdown to extend their lead to 28–14. Both teams would do nothing in the final quarter as the Devils would keep the Territorial Cup in Tempe with the victory.

With the loss, Arizona finished the season with a record of 6–6 and despite being bowl-eligible, they did not get an invitation for the postseason, mainly due to them finishing with a losing conference record (teams had to finish the regular season with a winning conference record in order to receive invitation for bowl games, and the Wildcats went 4–5 against Pac-10 teams, thus leading to them being uninvited to a bowl).

== Awards and honors ==
- Nick Folk, K/P, First-team All-Pac-10
