= 2006 Arizona State Sun Devils football team =

American college football season

2006 Arizona State Sun Devils football

Hawaii Bowl, L 24–41 vs. Hawaii
- Conference: Pacific-10 Conference
- Record: 7–6 (4–5 Pac-10)
- Head coach: Dirk Koetter (6th season)
- Offensive coordinator: Roy Wittke (1st season)
- Defensive coordinator: Bill Miller (2nd season)
- Captains: Josh Barrett; Kyle Caldwell; Jordan Hill; Zach Miller
- Home stadium: Sun Devil Stadium

Uniform

2006 Pacific-10 Conference football standings
	Conf.			Overall
Team	W		L	W		L
No. 4 USC +	7	–	2	11	–	2
No. 14 California +	7	–	2	10	–	3
No. 21 Oregon State	6	–	3	10	–	4
UCLA	5	–	4	7	–	6
Arizona State	4	–	5	7	–	6
Oregon	4	–	5	7	–	6
Arizona	4	–	5	6	–	6
Washington State	4	–	5	6	–	6
Washington	3	–	6	5	–	7
Stanford	1	–	8	1	–	11
+ – Conference co-champions; Rankings from AP Poll

The 2006 Arizona State Sun Devils football team represented Arizona State University as a member of the Pacific-10 Conference (Pac-10) during the 2006 NCAA Division I FBS football season. Led by Dirk Koetter in his sixth and final season as head coach, the Sun Devils compiled an overall record of 7–6 with a mark of 4–5 in conference play, placing in a four-way tie for fifth place in the Pac-10. Arizona State was invited to the Hawaii Bowl, where the Sun Devils lost to Hawaii. The team played home games at Sun Devil Stadium in Tempe, Arizona.

== Schedule ==
Date	Time	Opponent	Rank	Site	TV	Result	Attendance	Source
August 31	7:00 pm	Northern Arizona*	No. 24	Sun Devil Stadium; Tempe, AZ	FSNAZ	W 35–14	53,540	
September 9	7:00 pm	Nevada*	No. 25	Sun Devil Stadium; Tempe, AZ	FSNAZ	W 52–21	54,232	
September 16	5:00 pm	at Colorado*	No. 22	Folsom Field; Boulder, CO	TBS	W 21–3	47,723	
September 23	12:30 pm	at No. 21 California	No. 22	California Memorial Stadium; Berkeley, CA	FSN	L 21–49	58,024	
September 30	12:30 pm	No. 14 Oregon		Sun Devil Stadium; Tempe, AZ	ABC	L 13–48	58,526	
October 14	5:00 pm	at No. 3 USC		Los Angeles Memorial Coliseum; Los Angeles, CA	ABC	L 21–28	91,126	
October 21	12:30 pm	Stanford^{†}		Sun Devil Stadium; Tempe, AZ		W 38–3	53,323	
October 28	5:00 pm	at Washington		Husky Stadium; Seattle, WWA	FSNAZ	W 26–23 ^{OT}	58,822	
November 4	2:05 pm	at Oregon State		Reser Stadium; Corvallis, OR		L 10–44	38,274	
November 11	7:00 pm	Washington State		Sun Devil Stadium; Tempe, AZ		W 47–14	53,289	
November 18	8:15 pm	UCLA		Sun Devil Stadium; Tempe, AZ	FSN	L 12–24	54,459	
November 25	4:00 pm	at Arizona		Arizona Stadium; Tucson, AZ (rivalry)	FSN	W 28–14	57,895	
December 24	6:00 pm	at Hawaii		Aloha Stadium; Hālawa, HI (Hawaii Bowl)	ESPN	L 24–41	43,435	
*Non-conference game; ^{†}Homecoming; Rankings from AP Poll released prior to the game; All times are in Mountain time

== Rankings ==
Ranking movements Legend: ██ Increase in ranking ██ Decrease in ranking — = Not ranked RV = Received votes
	Week															
Poll	Pre	1	2	3	4	5	6	7	8	9	10	11	12	13	14	Final
AP	24	25	22	22	RV	—	—	—	—	—	—	—	—	—	—	—
Coaches	RV	RV	23	18	RV	—	—	—	—	—	—	—	—	—	—	—
Harris	Not released				—	—	—	—	—	—	—	—	—	—	—	Not released
BCS	Not released							—	—	—	—	—	—	—	—	Not released

== Game summaries ==
=== Northern Arizona ===
Team	1	2	3	4	Total
• Northern Arizona	7	7	0	0	14
Arizona St					0

- Date: August 31
- Location: Sun Devil Stadium, Tempe, Arizona
- Television network: FSN Arizona

Rudy Carpenter threw for 261 yards and 2 touchdowns and an interception as The Sun Devils needed a strong fourth quarter to beat I-AA Northern Arizona at home.

=== Nevada ===
Team	1	2	3	4	Total
Nevada	0	14	0	7	21
• Arizona St	7	24	14	7	52

- Date: September 9
- Location: Sun Devil Stadium, Tempe, Arizona
- Television network: FSN Arizona

ASU had 575 total yards, as Rudy Carpenter threw for 333 yards and 5 touchdowns (to 5 different receivers) and an interception and the Sun Devils rolled over the Wolf Pack. RB Ryan Torain led ASU with 70 yards and a touchdown on 8 carries.

=== Colorado ===
#22 Arizona State Sun Devils (2–0) at Colorado Buffaloes (0–2)

Quarter	1	2	3	4	Total
Arizona St	7	7	0	7	21
Colorado	3	0	0	0	3

at Folsom Field • Boulder, Colorado

- Date: September 16
- Game time: 5:00 p.m. MDT
- Game weather: Partly cloudy • 58 °F (14 °C) • Wind W 12 miles per hour (19 km/h; 10 kn)
- Game attendance: 47,723
- Referee: Randy Christal
- TV: FSN Arizona

Game information

Arizona St

- Rudy Carpenter
  21/37, 248 Yds, 2 TD, 2 INT
- Keegan Herring
  9 Rush, 82 Yds
- Jamaal Lewis
  3 Rec, 48 Yds

Colorado

- Bernard Jackson
  8/18, 86 Yds, INT
- Hugh Charles
  20 Rush, 109 Yds
  2 Rec, 30 Yds

ASU had 440 total yards, as Rudy Carpenter threw for 248 yards, 2 touchdowns, and 2 interceptions and the Sun Devils defeated the Buffaloes. ASU RBs Keegan Herring and Ryan Torain combined for 162 yards and 1 touchdown on 27 carries. The ASU defense held Colorado QB Bernard Jackson to 86 passing yards.

Scoring summary

Quarter	Time	Drive			Team	Scoring information	Score	
Quarter	Time	Plays	Yards	TOP	Team	Scoring information	ASU	COL
1	12:57	4	5	1:20	Colorado	29-yard field goal by Mason Crosby	0	3
1	0:04	10	71	4:29	Arizona St	Ryan Torain 8-yard touchdown run, Jesse Ainsworth kick good	7	3
2	10:44	6	40	2:06	Arizona St	Chris McGaha 18-yard touchdown reception from Rudy Carpenter, Jesse Ainsworth kick good	14	3
4	1:33	6	20	2:22	Arizona St	Zach Miller 5-yard touchdown reception from Rudy Carpenter, Jesse Ainsworth kick good	21	3
"TOP" = time of possession. For other American football terms, see Glossary of American football.							21	3

=== California ===
Team	1	2	3	4	Total
Arizona St	7	7	7	0	21
• California	14	28	0	7	49

- Date: September 23
- Location: Memorial Stadium, Berkeley, California
- Television network: FSN Arizona

Ryan Torain rushed for 185 yards and 1 touchdown, but Rudy Carpenter threw 4 INTs as the Sun Devils struggled all afternoon against the Golden Bears. The ASU defense, who had only given up 38 points all year, gave up 396 yards on defense.

=== Oregon ===
Team	1	2	3	4	Total
• Oregon	14	10	7	17	48
Arizona St	0	3	10	0	13

- Date: September 30
- Location: Sun Devil Stadium, Tempe, Arizona
- Television network: FSN Arizona

Ryan Torain rushed for 113 yards, but Rudy Carpenter completed only 6 passes for 33 yards as the Sun Devils never led against the Ducks. The Sun Devil offense only went 1-13 on 3rd down conversions, and could only muster 213 total yards. The ASU defense coughed up 584 yards, a season high.

=== USC ===
Team	1	2	3	4	Total
Arizona St	0	7	14	0	21
• USC	14	7	0	7	28

- Date: October 14
- Location: Los Angeles Memorial Coliseum, Los Angeles, California

The ASU defense caused 4 USC turnovers, but they could only manage 266 total yards as the Sun Devils lost a close one to USC, 28-21. Rudy Carpenter went 12-21 with 124 yards. Ryan Torain collected 96 total yards and a touchdown.

=== Stanford ===
Team	1	2	3	4	Total
Stanford	0	0	3	0	3
• Arizona St	10	7	14	7	38

- Date: October 21
- Location: Sun Devil Stadium, Tempe, Arizona

Scoring summary
1	10:48	ASU	Ryan Torain 27 yard pass from Rudy Carpenter (Jesse Ainsworth kick)	Arizona St 7–0
1	1:46	ASU	Jesse Ainsworth 19 yard field goal	Arizona St 10–0
2	7:32	ASU	Ryan Torain 2 yard run (Jesse Ainsworth kick)	Arizona St 17–0
3	8:49	ASU	Keegan Herring 8 yard run (Jesse Ainsworth kick)	Arizona St 24–0
3	6:20	ASU	Keegan Herring 6 yard run (Jesse Ainsworth kick)	Arizona St 31–0
3	3:53	STAN	Aaron Zagory 35 yard field goal	Arizona St 31–3
4	6:56	ASU	Dimitri Nance 13 yard run (Jesse Ainsworth kick)	Arizona St 38–3

Homecoming weekend proved to be nice to the Devils, who punished a struggling Stanford squad, 38-3. Rudy Carpenter went 14-15 with 160 yards and a touchdown. Keegan Herring rushed for 2 touchdowns. The Cardinal offense was held to only 190 yards.

=== Washington ===
Team	1	2	3	4	OT	Total
• Arizona St	0	14	6	0	6	26
Washington	0	3	3	14	3	23

- Date: October 28
- Location: Husky Stadium, Seattle, Washington

Homecoming weekend in Seattle was ruined by a walk-off Carpenter to Brent Miller touchdown pass in Overtime.

=== Oregon State ===
Team	1	2	3	4	Total
Arizona St	0	10	0	0	10
• Oregon St	17	14	3	10	44

- Date: November 4
- Location: Reser Stadium, Corvallis, Oregon

=== Washington State ===
Team	1	2	3	4	Total
Washington St	7	0	0	7	14
• Arizona St	17	13	7	10	47

- Date: November 11
- Location: Sun Devil Stadium, Tempe, Arizona

=== UCLA ===
Team	1	2	3	4	Total
• UCLA	7	7	3	7	24
Arizona St	3	6	3	0	12

- Date: November 18
- Location: Sun Devil Stadium, Tempe, Arizona

=== Arizona ===
Team	1	2	3	4	Total
• Arizona St	21	0	7	0	28
Arizona	0	14	0	0	14

- Date: November 25
- Location: Arizona Stadium, Tucson, Arizona

=== Hawaii Bowl ===
Team	1	2	3	4	Total
Arizona St	3	7	0	14	24
• Hawaii	0	3	21	17	41

- Date: December 24
- Location: Aloha Stadium, Honolulu, Hawaii
- Television network: ESPN

Colt Brennan broke the NCAA single-season record for touchdown passes with 58, throwing five in the second half to lead Hawaii to a 41-24 victory over Arizona State in the Hawaii Bowl.

Brennan, 33-of-42 for 559 yards, threw a 7-yard scoring pass to Ryan Grice-Mullen on the Warriors' second series of the second half to break the previous mark of 54 set by Houston's David Klingler in 1990, also against the Sun Devils.

Brennan tied the record with his 54th touchdown pass on the previous series, throwing a 38-yard scoring pass to Jason Rivers.

Brennan and Rivers, selected the co-MVPs for Hawaii, also teamed on the final touchdown pass, a 79-yarder late in the fourth quarter. Rivers finished the game with 308 yards on 14 catches, the most in a college bowl game since 1937, which is as far as the record books go back.

Brennan also set the WAC single-season record for most passing yards (5,549), which was previously held by BYU's Ty Detmer in 1990.

The Warrior offense racked up a season high 680 total yards, while the defense held Arizona State to 391 yards, sacked Sun Devil quarterback Rudy Carpenter four times, and forced two fumbles, one in the red zone halting an ASU drive, and another which led to a field goal.

Brennan finished the season with 5,549 yards to become just the third quarterback in college history with 5,000 yards and 50 touchdowns in a season, joining Klingler and Texas Tech's B. J. Symons. Tarryl Gano Finished the season leading the Sun Devil's in interceptions with 6.

Hawaii (11-3) matched the school mark for most wins in a season, set in 1992 when the team went 11-2. The Sun Devils (7-6) concluded their disappointing season, unable to send coach Dirk Koetter out with a win. He coached his final game after being fired the previous month. Dennis Erickson has been hired to take over the team.

- Game MVPs: Jason Rivers, WR & Colt Brennan, QB: Hawaii. Ryan Torain, RB: Arizona State

== Roster ==
2006 Arizona State Sun Devils football team roster
Players
Coaches
Offense

Pos.	#	Name	Class
WR		Rudy Burgess
QB		Rudy Carpenter
WR		Jamaal Lewis
WR		Chris McGaha
TE		Zach Miller (C)
RB		Ryan Torain

Defense {{American football roster/Player|num=|class=|first=Kyle|last=Caldwell|pos=DL|note=C}}

Pos.	#	Name	Class
DB		Tarryl Gano (4 * recruit)
DL		Jordan Hill (C)

Special teams

Pos.	#	Name	Class
K		Jesse Ainsworth

Head coach

- Dirk Koetter

Coordinators/assistant coaches

- Bill Miller
- Roy Wittke

Legend

- (C) Team captain
- (S) Suspended
- (I) Ineligible
- Injured
- Redshirt
