= 2006 Washington State Cougars football team =

American college football season

2006 Washington State Cougars football
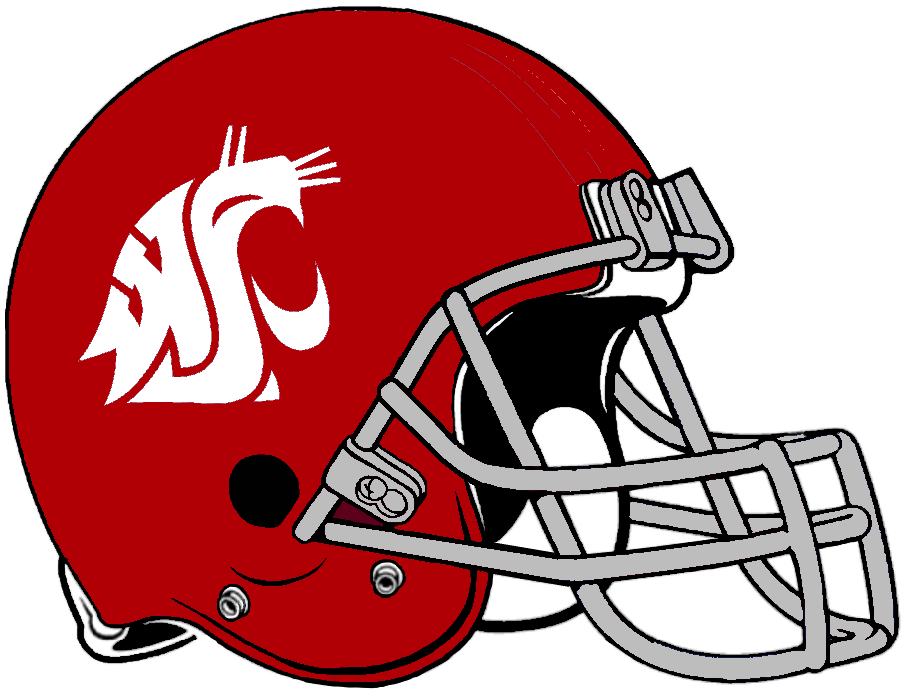
- Conference: Pacific-10 Conference
- Record: 6–6 (4–5 Pac-10)
- Head coach: Bill Doba (4th season)
- Offensive coordinator: Mike Levenseller (6th season)
- Offensive scheme: Spread
- Defensive coordinator: Robb Akey (4th season)
- Base defense: 4–3
- Home stadium: Martin Stadium (Capacity: 35,117)

2006 Pacific-10 Conference football standings
	Conf.			Overall
Team	W		L	W		L
No. 4 USC +	7	–	2	11	–	2
No. 14 California +	7	–	2	10	–	3
No. 21 Oregon State	6	–	3	10	–	4
UCLA	5	–	4	7	–	6
Arizona State	4	–	5	7	–	6
Oregon	4	–	5	7	–	6
Arizona	4	–	5	6	–	6
Washington State	4	–	5	6	–	6
Washington	3	–	6	5	–	7
Stanford	1	–	8	1	–	11
+ – Conference co-champions; Rankings from AP Poll

The 2006 Washington State Cougars football team represented Washington State University in the 2006 NCAA Division I FBS football season. The team was led by fourth-year head coach Bill Doba and played its home games on campus at Martin Stadium in Pullman, with one at Qwest Field in Seattle. The Cougars were 6–6 overall and 4–5 in the Pacific-10 Conference, tied for fifth. Ranked 25th in the AP Poll at the end of October, WSU lost its final three games.

WSU's popular mascot, "Butch T. Cougar" was named the 2006 CapitalOne Mascot of the Year.

== Pre-season ==
Washington State did not appear in any national pre-season rankings and was predicted to finish in eighth place in the Pacific-10 Conference media poll.

== Schedule ==
Date	Time	Opponent	Rank	Site	TV	Result	Attendance
September 2	4:45 pm	at No. 4 Auburn*		Jordan–Hare Stadium; Auburn, Alabama	ESPN2	L 14–40	87,451
September 9	12:45 pm	Idaho*		Martin Stadium; Pullman, Washington (Battle of the Palouse)	FSNNW	W 56–10	29,431
September 16	2:00 pm	Baylor*		Qwest Field; Seattle (Cougar Gridiron Classic)		W 17–15	41,358
September 23	2:00 pm	at Stanford		Stanford Stadium; Stanford, California		W 36–10	37,498
September 30	4:00 pm	No. 2 USC		Martin Stadium; Pullman, Washington	TBS	L 22–28	35,117
October 7	4:00 pm	at Oregon State		Reser Stadium; Corvallis, Oregon	FSNNW	W 13–6	42,951
October 14	2:00 pm	No. 11 California^{†}		Martin Stadium; Pullman, Washington		L 3–21	31,441
October 21	2:00 pm	No. 15 Oregon		Martin Stadium; Pullman, Washington		W 34–23	35,117
October 28	4:00 pm	at UCLA		Rose Bowl; Pasadena, California	ABC	W 37–15	53,058
November 4	2:00 pm	Arizona	No. 25	Martin Stadium; Pullman, Washington		L 17–27	35,117
November 11	6:00 pm	at Arizona State		Sun Devil Stadium; Tempe, Arizona		L 14–47	53,289
November 18	3:45 pm	Washington		Martin Stadium; Pullman, Washington (Apple Cup)	FSN	L 32–35	35,117
*Non-conference game; ^{†}Homecoming; Rankings from AP Poll released prior to the game; All times are in Pacific time
