= 2006 UCLA Bruins football team =

American college football season

2006 UCLA Bruins football

Emerald Bowl, L 27–44 vs. Florida State
- Conference: Pacific-10 Conference
- Record: 7–6 (5–4 Pac-10)
- Head coach: Karl Dorrell (4th season)
- Offensive coordinator: Jim Svoboda (1st season)
- Offensive scheme: Spread
- Defensive coordinator: DeWayne Walker (1st season)
- Base defense: 4–3
- Home stadium: Rose Bowl

Uniform

2006 Pacific-10 Conference football standings
	Conf.			Overall
Team	W		L	W		L
No. 4 USC +	7	–	2	11	–	2
No. 14 California +	7	–	2	10	–	3
No. 21 Oregon State	6	–	3	10	–	4
UCLA	5	–	4	7	–	6
Arizona State	4	–	5	7	–	6
Oregon	4	–	5	7	–	6
Arizona	4	–	5	6	–	6
Washington State	4	–	5	6	–	6
Washington	3	–	6	5	–	7
Stanford	1	–	8	1	–	11
+ – Conference co-champions; Rankings from AP Poll

The 2006 UCLA Bruins football team represented the University of California, Los Angeles (UCLA) in the 2006 NCAA Division I FBS football season. They played their home games at the Rose Bowl in Pasadena, California and were coached by Karl Dorrell. It was Dorrell's fourth season as the UCLA head coach. The Bruins finished 7–6 overall, and were fourth in the Pacific-10 Conference with a 5–4 record.

== Schedule ==
Date	Time	Opponent	Site	TV	Result	Attendance
September 2	4:00 pm	Utah*	Rose Bowl; Pasadena, CA	FSN	W 31–10	59,709
September 9	7:00 pm	Rice*	Rose Bowl; Pasadena, CA	FSNPT	W 26–16	46,023
September 23	4:00 pm	at Washington	Husky Stadium; Seattle, WA	TBS	L 19–29	58,255
September 30	7:15 pm	Stanford	Rose Bowl; Pasadena, CA (rivalry)	FSN	W 31–0	72,095
October 7	4:00 pm	Arizona	Rose Bowl; Pasadena, CA	FSNPT	W 27–7	65,644
October 14	12:30 pm	at No. 18 Oregon	Autzen Stadium; Eugene, OR	ABC	L 20–30	58,618
October 21	2:30 pm	at No. 10 Notre Dame*	Notre Dame Stadium; Notre Dame, IN	NBC	L 17–20	80,795
October 28	4:00 pm	Washington State^{†}	Rose Bowl; Pasadena, CA	ABC	L 15–37	53,058
November 4	5:00 pm	at No. 10 California	California Memorial Stadium; Berkeley, CA (rivalry)	ABC	L 24–38	72,516
November 11	3:15 pm	Oregon State	Rose Bowl; Pasadena, CA	FSNPT	W 25–7	67,532
November 18	7:15 pm	at Arizona State	Sun Devil Stadium; Tempe, AZ	FSN	W 24–12	54,459
December 2	1:30 pm	No. 2 USC	Rose Bowl; Pasadena, CA (Victory Bell)	ABC	W 13–9	90,622
December 27	5:00 pm	vs. Florida State*	AT&T Park; San Francisco, CA (Emerald Bowl)	ESPN	L 27–44	40,331
*Non-conference game; ^{†}Homecoming; Rankings from Coaches; All times are in Pacific time

== Game summaries ==
=== Utah ===
	1	2	3	4	Total
Utes	0	10	0	0	10
Bruins	7	7	7	10	31

Ben Olson threw for 318 yards and 3 touchdowns, with no sacks. Total rushing for the Bruins was 107 yards.

=== Rice ===
	1	2	3	4	Total
Owls	0	0	10	6	16
Bruins	6	7	3	10	26

Ben Olson passed for 124 yards and 2 touchdowns. He was also sacked 4 times. Chris Markey rushed for 208 yards, and Kahlil Bell rushed for 102.

=== Washington ===
	1	2	3	4	Total
Bruins	13	3	3	0	19
Huskies	0	7	7	15	29

UCLA's started the game strong, scoring a field goal on the first drive and then recovering a Washington fumble to score a touchdown. The next two drives of the first quarter ended with field goals, and UCLA was up at the half 16-7.

=== Stanford ===
	1	2	3	4	Total
Cardinal	0	0	0	0	0
Bruins	7	0	7	17	31

Eric McNeal blocked a Cardinal punt and returned it for a touchdown in the first quarter. Chane Moline rushed for 3 yards and 2 touchdowns. Justin Medlock kicked a 40-yard field goal in the fourth quarter. Kenneth Lombard recovered a fumble for a touchdown with 5:13 left in the game.

=== Arizona ===
	1	2	3	4	Total
Wildcats	0	7	0	0	7
Bruins	7	7	6	7	27

Patrick Cowan passed for 201 yards and 2 touchdowns. Justin Medlock kicked 2 field goals in the third quarter. Al Verner had an 89-yard interception that he returned for a touchdown with 4:19 left in the game.

=== Oregon ===
	1	2	3	4	Total
Bruins	3	3	0	14	20
Ducks	20	0	7	3	30

Kahlil Bell rushed for 6 yards and 2 touchdowns. Patrick Cowan threw for 112 yards, no touchdowns, and was sacked twice.

=== Notre Dame ===
	1	2	3	4	Total
Bruins	0	14	0	3	17
Fighting Irish	7	3	3	7	20

Justin Medlock missed a 47-yard field goal in the first quarter, and made a 29-yard field goal in the fourth. William Snead and Marcus Everett both rushed for touchdowns. Patrick Cowan threw for 217 yards, 2 touchdowns, and was sacked 3 times.

=== Washington State ===
	1	2	3	4	Total
Cougars	0	14	9	14	37
Bruins	6	9	0	0	15

Patrick Cowan threw for 252 yards and 1 touchdown.

=== California ===
	1	2	3	4	Total
Bruins	0	10	0	14	24
Bears	7	7	14	10	38

Patrick Cowan threw for 329 yards and no touchdowns. Chris Markey rushed for 136 yards and 1 touchdown. Chane Moline and Patrick Cowan also each rushed for a touchdown.

=== Oregon State ===
	1	2	3	4	Total
Beavers	0	7	0	0	7
Bruins	0	6	7	12	25

Patrick Cowan threw for 126 yards and 2 touchdowns. Justin Medlock kicked 4 field goals.

=== Arizona State ===
	1	2	3	4	Total
Bruins	7	7	3	7	24
Sun Devils	3	6	3	0	12

The Bruins became bowl eligible after beating Arizona State. Patrick Cowan threw for 187 yards and 2 touchdowns, and was sacked 3 times. Brandon Breazell rushed for 91 yards and 2 touchdowns.

=== USC ===
	1	2	3	4	Total
Trojans	0	9	0	0	9
Bruins	7	0	3	3	13

The Bruins beat the Trojans for the first time since 1998, ending the Trojans chance to play in the National Championship game. Patrick Cowan passed for 114 yards and ran for another 55.

=== Florida State ===
	1	2	3	4	Total
Seminoles	7	6	10	21	44
Bruins	10	10	7	0	27

The Bruins lost to the Seminoles in their first appearance at the Emerald Bowl. In February 2010, Florida State vacated this win due to NCAA rule violations.

== Coaching staff ==
- Karl Dorrell - head coach - fourth year
- Jim Svoboda - offensive coordinator and quarterbacks'
- DeWayne Walker - defensive coordinator and secondary
- Jim Colletto - assistant head coach and offensive line
- Mike Rutenberg - graduate assistant
