= 2006 Oregon State Beavers football team =

American college football season

2006 Oregon State Beavers football

Sun Bowl champion

Sun Bowl, W 39–38 vs. Missouri
- Conference: Pacific-10 Conference

Ranking
- Coaches: No. 22
- AP: No. 21
- Record: 10–4 (6–3 Pac-10)
- Head coach: Mike Riley (6th season)
- Offensive coordinator: Danny Langsdorf (2nd season)
- Offensive scheme: Multiple
- Defensive coordinator: Mark Banker (4th season)
- Base defense: 4–3
- Captains: Yvenson Bernard; Matt Moore; Joe Newton; Sabby Piscitelli
- Home stadium: Reser Stadium

2006 Pacific-10 Conference football standings
	Conf.			Overall
Team	W		L	W		L
No. 4 USC +	7	–	2	11	–	2
No. 14 California +	7	–	2	10	–	3
No. 21 Oregon State	6	–	3	10	–	4
UCLA	5	–	4	7	–	6
Arizona State	4	–	5	7	–	6
Oregon	4	–	5	7	–	6
Arizona	4	–	5	6	–	6
Washington State	4	–	5	6	–	6
Washington	3	–	6	5	–	7
Stanford	1	–	8	1	–	11
+ – Conference co-champions; Rankings from AP Poll

The 2006 Oregon State Beavers football team represented Oregon State University in the 2006 NCAA Division I FBS football season. The team's head coach was Mike Riley, with home games being played at Reser Stadium in Corvallis, Oregon.

== Schedule ==
Date	Time	Opponent	Rank	Site	TV	Result	Attendance	Source
August 31	7:00 pm	Eastern Washington*		Reser Stadium; Corvallis, OR	FSNNW	W 56–17	38,071	
September 7	4:30 pm	at Boise State*		Bronco Stadium; Boise, ID	ESPN	L 14–42	30,711	
September 23	7:15 pm	Idaho*		Reser Stadium; Corvallis, OR	FSNNW	W 38–0	40,317	
September 30	1:00 pm	No. 20 California		Reser Stadium; Corvallis, OR		L 13–41	39,309	
October 7	4:00 pm	Washington State		Reser Stadium; Corvallis, OR	FSNNW	L 6–13	42,951	
October 14	3:30 pm	at Washington		Husky Stadium; Seattle, WA	FSNNW	W 27–17	62,656	
October 21	4:00 pm	at Arizona		Arizona Stadium; Tucson, AZ		W 17–10	57,113	
October 28	12:30 pm	No. 3 USC		Reser Stadium; Corvallis, OR	FSN	W 33–31	42,871	
November 4	1:00 pm	Arizona State^{†}		Reser Stadium; Corvallis, OR		W 44–10	38,274	
November 11	3:15 pm	at UCLA		Rose Bowl; Pasadena, CA	FSNNW	L 7–25	67,532	
November 18	12:30 pm	at Stanford		Stanford Stadium; Stanford, CA	FSNNW	W 30–7	38,502	
November 24	12:30 pm	Oregon		Reser Stadium; Corvallis, OR (Civil War)	FSN	W 30–28	44,015	
December 2	9:00 pm	at No. 24 Hawaii*		Aloha Stadium; Halawa, HI	ESPN	W 35–32	50,000	
December 29	11:15 am	vs. Missouri*	No. 24	Sun Bowl; El Paso, TX (Sun Bowl)	CBS	W 39–38	48,732	
*Non-conference game; ^{†}Homecoming; Rankings from AP Poll released prior to the game; All times are in Pacific time

== Game summaries ==
=== Eastern Washington ===
	1	2	3	4	Total
Eastern Washington	0	7	3	7	17
Oregon State	21	21	7	7	56

=== Boise State ===
	1	2	3	4	Total
Oregon State	14	0	0	0	14
Boise State	7	21	7	7	42

=== Idaho ===
	1	2	3	4	Total
Idaho	0	0	0	0	0
Oregon State	14	3	14	7	38

=== California ===
	1	2	3	4	Total
#20 California	21	10	7	3	41
Oregon State	0	3	3	7	13

=== Washington State ===
	1	2	3	4	Total
Washington State	3	3	7	0	13
Oregon State	0	3	0	3	6

=== Washington ===
	1	2	3	4	Total
Oregon State	7	3	10	7	27
Washington	3	14	0	0	17

=== Arizona ===
	1	2	3	4	Total
Oregon State	14	0	0	3	17
Arizona	0	3	7	0	10

=== USC ===
#2 USC at Oregon State

Team	1	2	3	4	Total
USC	0	10	7	14	31
• Oregon State	7	9	17	0	33

- Date: October 28
- Location: Reser Stadium, Corvallis, Oregon
- Game start: 12:30 p.m. PDT

Scoring summary
1	10:09	OSU	Matt Moore 1-yard run (Alexis Serna kick)	OSU 7-0
2	10:47	USC	Chauncey Washington 2-yard run (Mario Danelo kick)	Tied 7-7
2	6:53	OSU	Alexis Serna 47-yard field goal	OSU 10-7
2	2:12	OSU	Alexis Serna 31-yard field goal	OSU 13-7
2	1:03	OSU	Alexis Serna 53-yard field goal	OSU 16-7
2	0:07	USC	Mario Danelo 29-yard field goal	OSU 16-10
3	9:27	OSU	Joe Newton 9-yard pass from Matt Moore (Alexis Serna kick)	OSU 23-10
3	7:55	OSU	Sammie Stroughter 70-yard punt return (Alexis Serna kick)	OSU 30-10
3	4:51	OSU	Alexis Serna 20-yard field goal	OSU 33-10
3	0:23	USC	Fred Davis 4-yard pass from John David Booty (Mario Danelo kick)	OSU 33-17
4	12:09	USC	Steve Smith 37-yard pass from John David Booty (Chauncey Washington run)	OSU 33-25
4	0:07	USC	Steve Smith 2-yard pass from John David Booty (pass failed)	OSU 33-31

After a mediocre 4–3 start, the Beavers had a historic 33–31 upset win over No. 3 USC that snapped the Trojans' 38-game regular season winning streak and 27-game Pac-10 winning streak. The Beavers won the Pontiac game changing performance award for the week in the PAC-10 and nationally after Jeff Van Orsow batted down a two-point conversion attempt, which stopped any hope of bringing the game to overtime. This was Oregon State's first victory over USC since 2000.

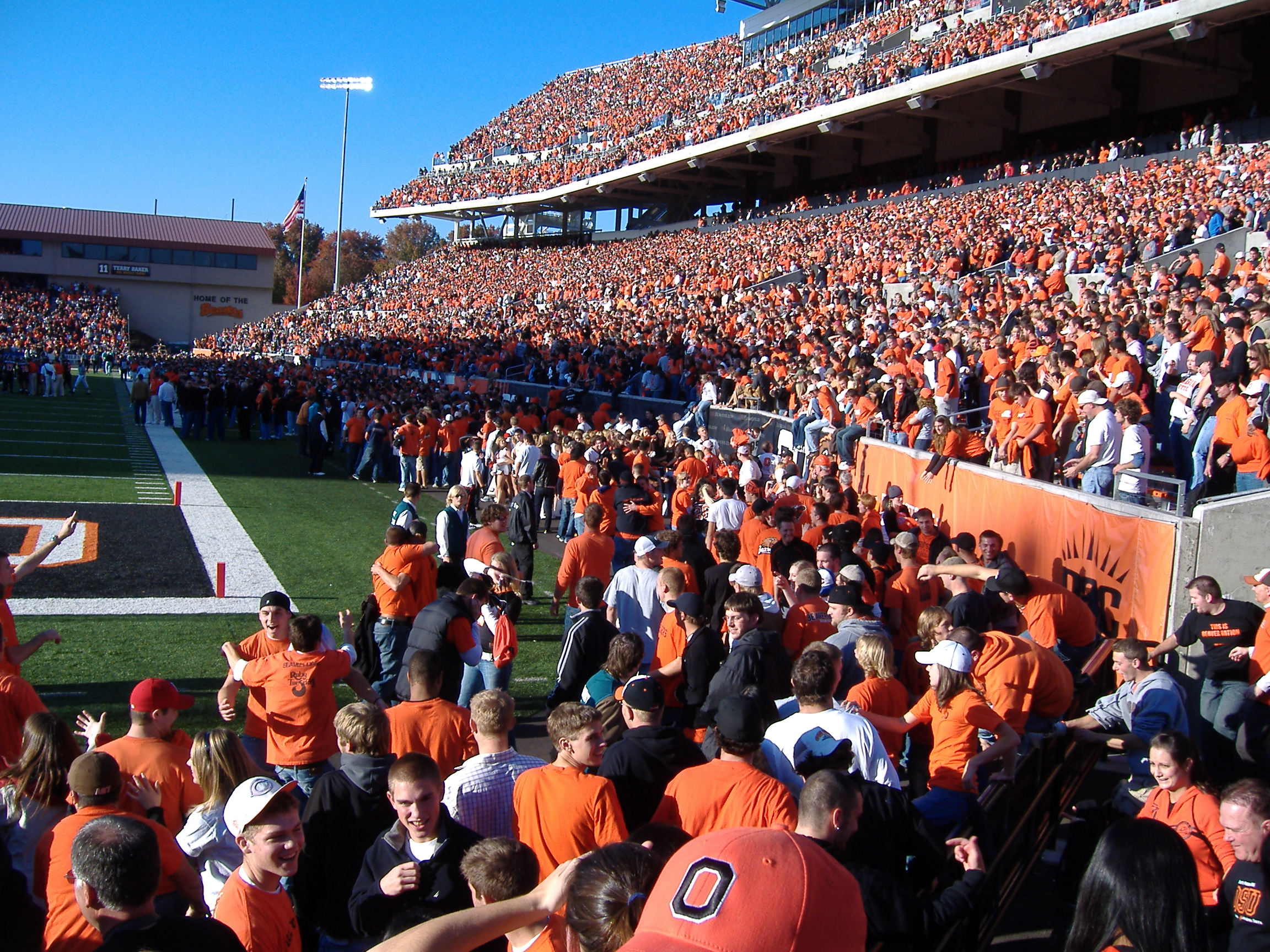
Oregon State fans prepare to rush the field in an historic upset of #3 USC in 2006

=== Arizona State ===
	1	2	3	4	Total
Arizona State	0	10	0	0	10
Oregon State	17	14	3	10	44

=== UCLA ===
	1	2	3	4	Total
Oregon State	0	7	0	0	7
UCLA	0	6	7	12	25

=== Stanford ===
	1	2	3	4	Total
Oregon State	7	13	3	7	30
Stanford	7	0	0	0	7

=== Oregon ===
Team	1	2	3	4	Total
Oregon	7	0	7	14	28
• Oregon State	7	13	7	3	30

- Date: November 24
- Location: Reser Stadium, Corvallis, Oregon
- Game start: 12:30 p.m. PST

Scoring summary
1	12:47	OSU	Jason Vandiver 11-yard pass from Matt Moore (Alexis Serna kick)	OSU 7-0
1	2:19	ORE	Jonathan Stewart 2-yard run (Paul Martinez kick)	Tied 7-7
2	12:59	OSU	Alexis Serna 49-yard field goal	OSU 10-7
2	11:43	OSU	Derrick Doggett 34-yard interception return (Alexis Serna kick)	OSU 17-7
2	0:33	OSU	Alexis Serna 50-yard field goal	OSU 20-7
3	11:41	ORE	Jonathan Stewart 22-yard run (Paul Martinez kick)	OSU 20-14
3	7:52	OSU	Yvenson Bernard 6-yard run (Alexis Serna kick)	OSU 27-14
4	6:00	ORE	Jonathan Stewart 2-yard run (kick blocked)	OSU 27-20
4	3:07	ORE	Jordan Kent 26-yard pass from Brady Leaf (Brady Leaf run)	ORE 28-27
4	1:12	OSU	Alexis Serna 40-yard field goal	OSU 31-28

The 110th Civil War was a thriller played at Reser Stadium. After scoring first, the Ducks failed to gain the lead until the 4th quarter. With 3:07 left to play and the Beavers up 27–20, the Ducks scored a touchdown and successfully made the 2-point conversion, sparking celebrations on the Oregon sideline as the Ducks went up 28–27. With 1:12 left in the game, OSU's kicker Alexis Serna kicked a clutch 40-yard field goal, that ended up being the game winner. Alexis Serna was pivotal in the Beaver victory, as he connected on field goals from 49, 40, and 50 yards. OSU defensive lineman Ben Siegert, who earlier in the game blocked a point-after attempt by the Ducks, blocked a 44-yard field goal attempt by Oregon's Matt Evensen with 20 seconds left to play. The Beavers won the Civil War 30–28.

=== Hawaii ===
	1	2	3	4	Total
Oregon State	7	14	7	7	35
#23 Hawai'i	0	21	3	8	32

=== Sun Bowl vs. Missouri ===
	1	2	3	4	Total
#25 Oregon State	14	0	7	18	39
Missouri	7	10	14	7	38

The 2006 Sun Bowl, in El Paso, Texas, and against the Missouri Tigers, was another thrilling and close game for the Beavers. After being down 14 points in the 4th quarter, the Beavers proceeded to score 7 in a drive that took about 3 and a half minutes. They next held the Tigers, and got the ball back, now only being down 7. With less than 2 minutes, and the ball, the Beavers proceed again to score. Coach Riley elected to go for a two-point conversion instead of kicking the extra point. The extra point would have been enough to tie the game and send it to overtime. The two-point conversion was successful, giving the Beavers a one-point lead with only 22 seconds left in the game, and the eventual win. The game was voted among the top three bowl games of the year by ESPN and Fox Sports.

== Roster ==
2006 Oregon State Beavers football team roster
Players
Coaches
Offense

Pos.	#	Name	Class
QB	8	Matt Moore	Sr
QB	10	Ryan Gunderson	Jr
RB	26	Yvenson Bernard	Jr

Defense

Pos.	#	Name	Class

Special teams

Pos.	#	Name	Class
K	13	Alexis Serna

Head coach

- Mike Riley

Coordinators/assistant coaches

Legend

- (C) Team captain
- (S) Suspended
- (I) Ineligible
- Injured
- Redshirt
