= Doug Sams =

American gridiron football player and coach (born 1955)

Biographical details
- Born: July 12, 1955 (age 71); Walla Walla, Washington, U.S.

Playing career
- 1974: Oregon State
- Position: Wide receiver

Coaching career (HC unless noted)
- 1978: Oregon State (assistant)
- 1979–1982: Northern Iowa (assistant)
- 1983–1985: Idaho State (assistant)
- 1986: Montreal Alouettes (OL)
- 1987: Edmonton Eskimos (DL/ST)
- 1988: Urbana
- 1989–1991: Ottawa Rough Riders (OC)
- 1992–2001: Fairmont State
- 2002–2005: Northern Michigan
- 2006: Stanford (OL/TE)
- 2007–2010: Delaware State (OC/QB)
- 2011: Edinboro (OC/QB)
- 2012: Hamilton Tiger-Cats (QB)
- 2013: Edmonton Eskimos (OC)

Head coaching record
- Overall: 70–82

Accomplishments and honors

Championships
- 2 WVIAC (1996, 2000)

Awards
- WVIAC Coach of the Year (1996)

Doug Sams (born July 12, 1955) is an American former gridiron football coach. He served as the head football coach at Urbana University in 1988, Fairmont State University from 1992 to 2001, and Northern Michigan University from 2002 to 2005, compiling a career college football coaching record of 70–82. Sams was an assistant coach for several teams in the Canadian Football League (CFL): the Montreal Alouettes, Edmonton Eskimos, Ottawa Rough Riders, and Hamilton Tiger-Cats.

== Head coaching record ==
| Year | Team | Overall | Conference | Standing | Bowl/playoffs |
|---|---|---|---|---|---|
Urbana Blue Knights (Mid-Ohio Conference) (1988)
| 1988 | Urbana | 4–6 | | | |
| Urbana: | | 4–6 | | | |
Fairmont State Fighting Falcons (West Virginia Intercollegiate Athletic Conference) (1992–2001)
| 1992 | Fairmont State | 4–6 | 3–4 | 5th | |
| 1993 | Fairmont State | 3–7 | 2–5 | 6th | |
| 1994 | Fairmont State | 3–7 | 2–4 | 5th | |
| 1995 | Fairmont State | 6–4 | 5–2 | T–3rd | |
| 1996 | Fairmont State | 6–4 | 6–1 | T–1st | |
| 1997 | Fairmont State | 5–6 | 3–4 | T–4th | |
| 1998 | Fairmont State | 5–5 | 5–2 | 2nd | |
| 1999 | Fairmont State | 8–2 | 5–1 | 2nd | |
| 2000 | Fairmont State | 7–3 | 6–1 | T–1st | |
| 2001 | Fairmont State | 6–3 | 5–2 | T–2nd | |
| Fairmont State: | | 53–47 | 42–26 | | |
Northern Michigan Wildcats (Great Lakes Intercollegiate Athletic Conference) (2002–2005)
| 2002 | Northern Michigan | 6–5 | 6–4 | 5th | |
| 2003 | Northern Michigan | 3–8 | 3–7 | 10th | |
| 2004 | Northern Michigan | 2–8 | 2–8 | 12th | |
| 2005 | Northern Michigan | 2–8 | 2–8 | 12th | |
| Northern Michigan: | | 13–29 | 13–27 | | |
| Total: | | 70–82 | | | |
National championship Conference title Conference division title or championship game berth
