= Jeremy Gibbs =

American gridiron football player (born 1985)

No. 72
- Position: Defensive tackle

Personal information
- Born: July 3, 1985 (age 41); Stillwater, Oklahoma, U.S.
- Listed height: 6 ft 3 in (1.91 m)
- Listed weight: 283 lb (128 kg)

Career information
- College: Oregon

Career history
- 2008–2010: BC Lions
- 2010: Hamilton Tiger-Cats
- Stats at CFL.ca

Jeremy Gibbs (born July 3, 1985) is an American former professional football defensive tackle. He was signed as an undrafted free agent by the BC Lions in 2008. He played college football at Oregon. On August 30, 2010, he signed as a free agent with the Hamilton Tiger-Cats of the Canadian Football League.
