= Darius Sanders =

American football player (born 1983)

No. 67
- Position: Defensive end

Personal information
- Born: September 25, 1983 (age 43); Los Angeles, California, U.S.
- Listed height: 6 ft 5 in (1.96 m)
- Listed weight: 275 lb (125 kg)

Career information
- College: Oregon
- NFL draft: 2007: undrafted

Career history
- San Francisco 49ers (2007)

Darius Sanders (born September 25, 1983) is an American former football defensive end for the San Francisco 49ers.

== Career ==
In 2002, Sanders signed with the Oregon Ducks. After his time with the Ducks ended in 2006, Sanders joined the San Francisco 49ers as a free agent.
