= 2005 Baltimore Ravens season =

NFL team season

- Owner: Steve Bisciotti
- General manager: Ozzie Newsome
- Head coach: Brian Billick
- Home stadium: M&T Bank Stadium

Results
- Record: 6–10
- Division place: 3rd AFC North
- Playoffs: Did not qualify
- Pro Bowlers: OT Jonathan Ogden

Uniform
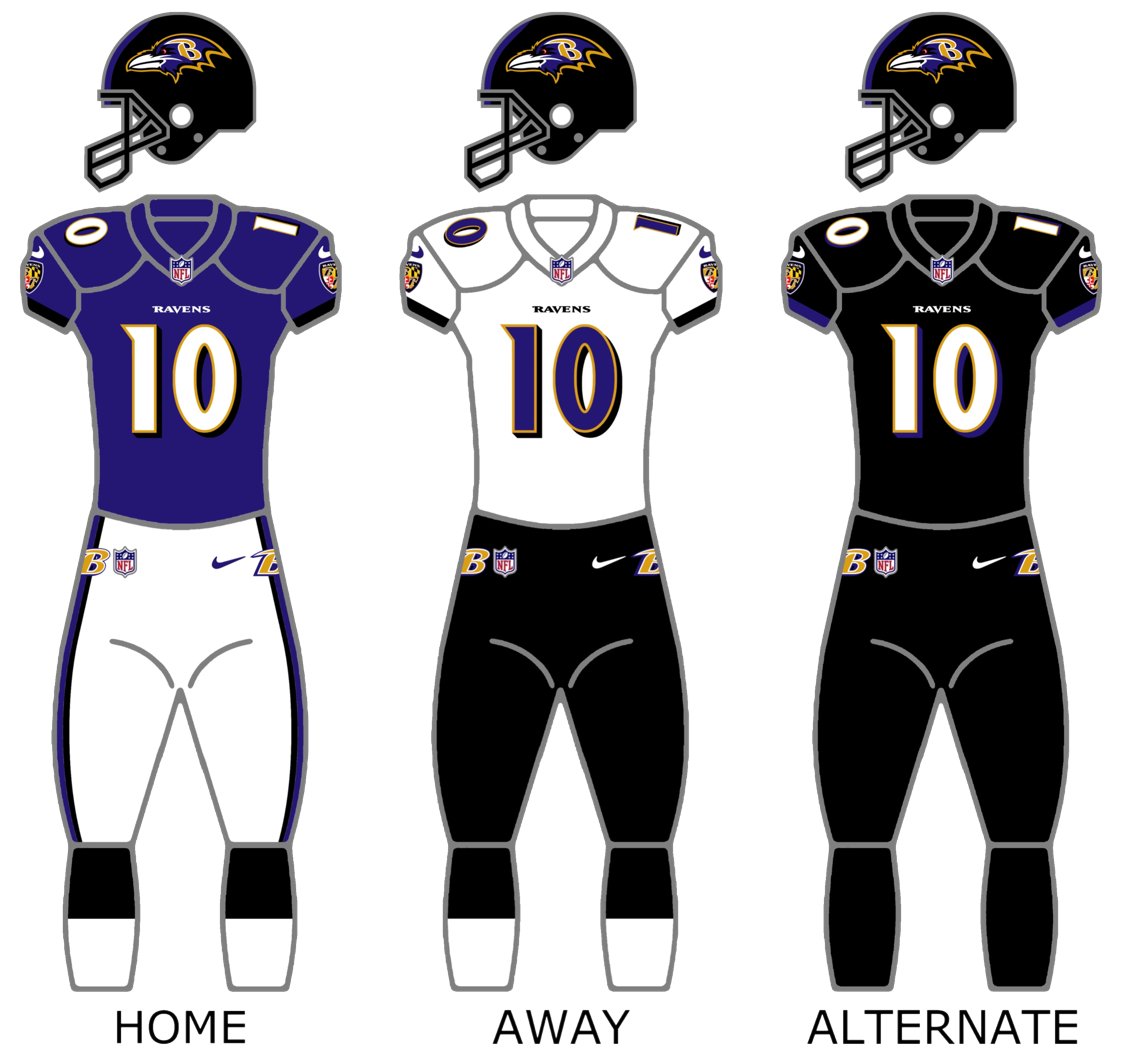

The 2005 season was the Baltimore Ravens' 10th in the National Football League (NFL), their 7th under head coach Brian Billick, and their 4th season under general manager Ozzie Newsome.

They were unable to improve upon their previous output of 9–7, instead going 6–10 and finished the season with double-digit losses for the first time since 1998. and missing the playoffs for the second straight season. The Ravens played on Christmas Day for the first time, defeating the Minnesota Vikings in Baltimore. As of 2024, Baltimore’s 48–3 win over the Green Bay Packers stands as the biggest blowout in Monday Night Football history.

The Ravens went 0–8 on the road for the first time since their inaugural season.

After the season, Peter Boulware decided he had played his final NFL game.

== Draft ==
2005 Baltimore Ravens draft
| Round | Pick | Player | Position | College | Notes |
| 1 | 22 | Mark Clayton | WR | Oklahoma | |
| 2 | 53 | Dan Cody | DE | Oklahoma | |
| 2 | 64 | Adam Terry | OT | Syracuse | |
| 4 | 124 | Jason Brown | C | North Carolina | |
| 5 | 158 | Justin Green | FB | Montana | |
| 6 | 213 | Derek Anderson * | QB | Oregon State | |
| 7 | 234 | Mike Smith | ILB | Texas Tech | |
Made roster † Pro Football Hall of Fame * Made at least one Pro Bowl during career

== Staff ==
2005 Baltimore Ravens staff
| Front office: Owner – Steve Bisciotti; Minority owner – Art Modell; President – Dick Cass; General manager/executive vice president – Ozzie Newsome; Vice president of football administration – Pat Moriarty; Director of college scouting – Eric DeCosta; Director of pro personnel – George Kokinis; Assistant director of pro personnel – Vincent Newsome; Head coaches: Head coach – Brian Billick; Assistant head coach/offensive line – Chris Foerster; Offensive coaches: Offensive coordinator – Jim Fassel; Quarterbacks – Rick Neuheisel; Assistant quarterbacks/wide receivers – Jedd Fisch; Running backs – Matt Simon; Wide receivers – David Shaw; Tight ends/assistant offensive line – Wade Harman | Defensive coaches: Defensive coordinator – Rex Ryan; Defensive line – Clarence Brooks; Linebackers – Jeff FitzGerald; Outside linebackers – Mike Pettine; Secondary – Johnnie Lynn; Secondary – Dennis Thurman; Special teams coaches: Special teams coordinator – Gary Zauner; Assistant special teams – John Fassel; Assistant special teams – Bennie Thompson; Strength and conditioning: Head athletic trainer – Bill Tessendorf; Assistant athletic trainer – Kevin Domboski; Strength and conditioning – Jeff Friday; Assistant strength and conditioning – Paul Ricci; Strength and conditioning intern – Juney Barnett |

== Roster ==
2005 Baltimore Ravens roster
| Quarterbacks (QB): 7 Kyle Boller; 14 Brian St. Pierre; 2 Anthony Wright; Running backs (RB): 33 Justin Green FB; 31 Jamal Lewis; 34 Ovie Mughelli FB; 36 B. J. Sams; 29 Chester Taylor; 30 Jamel White; Wide receivers (WR): 89 Mark Clayton; 81 Devard Darling; 80 Randy Hymes; 11 Patrick Johnson; 85 Derrick Mason; 84 Clarence Moore; Tight ends (TE): 87 Darnell Dinkins; 86 Todd Heap | Offensive linemen (OL): 60 Jason Brown G; 62 Mike Flynn C; 64 Edwin Mulitalo G; 75 Jonathan Ogden OT; 79 Tony Pashos OT; 69 Brian Rimpf G; 63 Thatcher Szalay C; 78 Adam Terry OT; Defensive linemen (DL): 93 Dwan Edwards DE; 91 Aubrayo Franklin NT; 97 Kelly Gregg NT; 95 Jarret Johnson DE; 92 Maʻake Kemoeatu NT; 72 Benard Thomas DE; 98 Anthony Weaver DE | Linebackers (LB): 58 Peter Boulware OLB; 54 Roderick Green OLB; 56 Dennis Haley ILB; 50 Tommy Polley ILB; 57 Bart Scott ILB; 55 Terrell Suggs OLB; 96 Adalius Thomas OLB; 59 Zac Woodfin ILB; Defensive backs (DB): 38 Robb Butler CB; 24 Dale Carter CB; 21 Chris McAlister CB; 25 Evan Oglesby CB; 20 Ed Reed FS; 22 Samari Rolle CB; 37 Deion Sanders CB; 46 B. J. Ward FS; 49 Chad Williams S; Special teams (ST): 8 Aaron Elling K; 70 Matt Katula LS; 3 Matt Stover K; 15 Dave Zastudil P | Practice squad: 19 Brian Bratton WR; 12 Romby Bryant WR; 43 Rob Abiamiri TE; 44 Bobby Blizzard TE; 73 Rob Droege OT; 74 Mike Kracalik OT; 28 Duvol Thompson CB; 23 Jamaine Winborne CB (IR); Reserve: 77 Orlando Brown OT (IR); 65 Drew Caylor LS (IR); 53 Dan Cody OLB (IR); 47 Will Demps S (IR); 61 Gary Gibson DE (IR); 52 Ray Lewis OLB (IR); 27 Cash Mouton CB (IR); 42 Zach Norton CB (IR); 39 Alan Ricard FB (IR); 51 Mike Smith ILB (IR); 32 Musa Smith RB (IR); 68 Keydrick Vincent G (IR); 83 Daniel Wilcox TE (IR); Rookies in italics 53 active, 12 reserve, 7 practice squad |

== Preseason ==
=== Schedule ===
| Week | Date | Opponent | Result | Record |
|---|---|---|---|---|
| 1 | August 13 | at Atlanta Falcons | L 3–16 | 0–1 |
| 2 | August 20 | Philadelphia Eagles | L 14–20 | 0–2 |
| 3 | August 26 | at New Orleans Saints | W 21–6 | 1–2 |
| 4 | September 1 | Washington Redskins | W 26–20 (OT) | 2–2 |

== Regular season ==
=== Schedule ===
In addition to their regular games with AFC North division rivals, the Ravens played games against the AFC South and NFC North according to the NFL’s division schedule, and also played against the New York Jets and the Denver Broncos, who in 2004 finished in the same position as the Ravens (second) in the two remaining AFC divisions.

| Week | Date | Opponent | Result | Record | Attendance |
|---|---|---|---|---|---|
| 1 | September 11 | Indianapolis Colts | **L** 7–24 | 0–1 | 70,501 |
| 2 | September 18 | at Tennessee Titans | **L** 10–25 | 0–2 | 69,149 |
| 3 | Bye | | | | |
| 4 | October 2 | New York Jets | **W** 13–3 | 1–2 | 70,479 |
| 5 | October 9 | at Detroit Lions | **L** 17–35 | 1–3 | 61,201 |
| 6 | October 16 | **Cleveland Browns** | **W** 16–3 | 2–3 | 70,196 |
| 7 | October 23 | at Chicago Bears | **L** 6–10 | 2–4 | 62,102 |
| 8 | October 31 | at **Pittsburgh Steelers** | **L** 19–20 | 2–5 | 64,178 |
| 9 | November 6 | **Cincinnati Bengals** | **L** 9–21 | 2–6 | 70,540 |
| 10 | November 13 | at Jacksonville Jaguars | **L** 3–30 | 2–7 | 66,107 |
| 11 | November 20 | **Pittsburgh Steelers** | **W** 16–13 _{(OT)} | 3–7 | 70,601 |
| 12 | November 27 | at **Cincinnati Bengals** | **L** 29–42 | 3–8 | 65,680 |
| 13 | December 4 | Houston Texans | **W** 16–15 | 4–8 | 69,909 |
| 14 | December 11 | at Denver Broncos | **L** 10–12 | 4–9 | 75,651 |
| 15 | December 19 | Green Bay Packers | **W** 48–3 | 5–9 | 70,604 |
| 16 | December 25 | Minnesota Vikings | **W** 30–23 | 6–9 | 70,246 |
| 17 | January 1 | at **Cleveland Browns** | **L** 16–20 | 6–10 | 69,871 |
Note: Intra-divisional games are in **bold** text.

=== Standings ===
AFC North
| | W | L | T | PCT | DIV | CONF | PF | PA | STK |
|---|---|---|---|---|---|---|---|---|---|
| ^{(3)} Cincinnati Bengals | 11 | 5 | 0 | .688 | 5–1 | 7–5 | 421 | 350 | L2 |
| ^{(6)} Pittsburgh Steelers | 11 | 5 | 0 | .688 | 4–2 | 7–5 | 389 | 258 | W4 |
| Baltimore Ravens | 6 | 10 | 0 | .375 | 2–4 | 4–8 | 265 | 299 | L1 |
| Cleveland Browns | 6 | 10 | 0 | .375 | 1–5 | 4–8 | 232 | 301 | W1 |
