= 2004 Baltimore Ravens season =

NFL team season

- Owner: Steve Bisciotti
- General manager: Ozzie Newsome
- Head coach: Brian Billick
- Home stadium: M&T Bank Stadium

Results
- Record: 9–7
- Division place: 2nd AFC North
- Playoffs: Did not qualify
- Pro Bowlers: OT Jonathan Ogden; MLB Ray Lewis; LB Terrell Suggs; CB Chris McAlister; S Ed Reed

Uniform
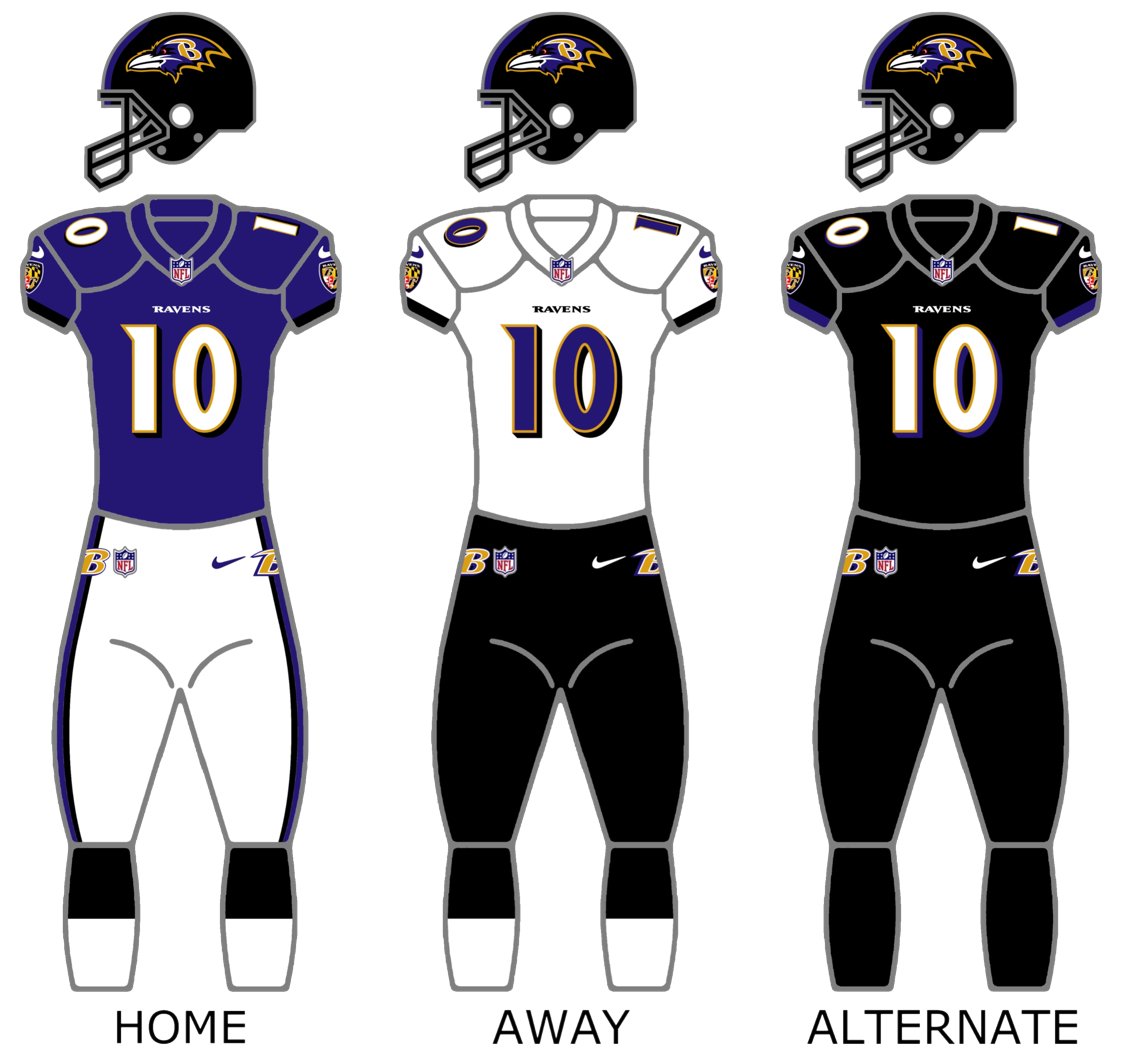

The 2004 season was the Baltimore Ravens' 9th in the National Football League (NFL), their 6th under head coach Brian Billick, and their 3rd season under general manager Ozzie Newsome.

They were unable to improve upon their previous output of 10–6 and a playoff appearance, instead going 9–7 and missing the playoffs ending in a season of disappointment.

The 2004 season was the subject of the John Feinstein non-fiction book Next Man Up; the result of Feinstein spending the season behind the scenes with the team.

It was highlighted by then-37-year-old Deion Sanders making a comeback after three years out of football. Meanwhile, Jamal Lewis, who was coming off a historic 2003 season, was arrested for drug charges and earned a two-game suspension by the NFL. He would finish the season with just 1,006 yards rushing as the Ravens were one of the worst offenses in the NFL in 2004. Ed Reed, who had 9 interceptions for the season, was named Defensive Player of the Year.

For the season, the Ravens introduced black alternate uniforms for the first time in franchise history.

== Draft ==
2004 Baltimore Ravens draft
Round	Pick	Player	Position	College	Notes
2	51	Dwan Edwards	DT	Oregon State	
3	82	Devard Darling	WR	Washington State	
5	153	Roderick Green	DE	Central Missouri	
6	187	Josh Harris	QB	Bowling Green	
6	199	Clarence Moore	WR	Northern Arizona	
7	244	Derek Abney	WR	Kentucky	
7	246	Brian Rimpf	G	East Carolina	
Made roster † Pro Football Hall of Fame * Made at least one Pro Bowl during career

== Personnel ==
=== Staff / Coaches ===
2004 Baltimore Ravens staff
Front office: Owner – Steve Bisciotti; Minority owner – Art Modell; President – Dick Cass; General manager/executive vice president – Ozzie Newsome; Director of football administration – Pat Moriarty; Director of college scouting – Eric DeCosta; Director of pro personnel – George Kokinis; Assistant director of pro personnel – Vincent Newsome; Head coaches: Head coach – Brian Billick; Offensive coaches: Offensive coordinator – Matt Cavanaugh; Quarterbacks/wide receivers – David Shaw; Running backs – Matt Simon; Tight ends/assistant offensive line – Wade Harman; Offensive line – Jim Colletto; Offensive assistant – Jedd Fisch; Senior consultant – Jim Fassel	Defensive coaches: Defensive coordinator – Mike Nolan; Defensive line – Rex Ryan; Linebackers – Jeff FitzGerald; Inside linebackers – Mike Singletary; Secondary – Johnnie Lynn; Secondary – Dennis Thurman; Defensive assistant/assistant defensive line – Mike Pettine; Defensive assistant – Phil Zacharias; Special teams coaches: Special teams coordinator – Gary Zauner; Assistant special teams – Bennie Thompson; Strength and conditioning: Head athletic trainer – Bill Tessendorf; Strength and conditioning – Jeff Friday; Assistant strength and conditioning – Paul Ricci; Strength and conditioning intern – Juney Barnett

=== Roster ===
2004 Baltimore Ravens roster
Quarterbacks (QB): 7 Kyle Boller; 10 Kordell Stewart; 2 Anthony Wright; Running backs (RB): 31 Jamal Lewis; 33 Harold Morrow FB; 39 Alan Ricard FB; 36 B.J. Sams; 29 Chester Taylor; 30 Jamel White; Wide receivers (WR): 80 Randy Hymes; 85 Kevin Johnson; 84 Clarence Moore; 89 Travis Taylor; Tight ends (TE): 87 Darnell Dinkins; 86 Todd Heap; 82 Terry Jones; 83 Daniel Wilcox	Offensive linemen (OL): 66 Bennie Anderson G; 77 Ethan Brooks OT; 78 Orlando Brown OT; 62 Mike Flynn C; 64 Edwin Mulitalo G; 75 Jonathan Ogden OT; 79 Tony Pashos OT; 61 Casey Rabach C; 69 Brian Rimpf G; Defensive linemen (DL): 94 Marques Douglas DE; 93 Dwan Edwards DE; 91 Aubrayo Franklin NT; 97 Kelly Gregg NT; 95 Jarret Johnson DE; 92 Maʻake Kemoeatu DE/NT; 98 Anthony Weaver DE	Linebackers (LB): 90 Cornell Brown OLB; 54 Roderick Green OLB; 56 Edgerton Hartwell ILB; 52 Ray Lewis ILB; 57 Bart Scott ILB; 53 T. J. Slaughter ILB; 55 Terrell Suggs OLB; 96 Adalius Thomas OLB; Defensive backs (DB): 28 Gary Baxter CB; 47 Will Demps FS; 26 Corey Fuller CB; 21 Chris McAlister CB; 20 Ed Reed SS; 37 Deion Sanders CB; 38 Raymond Walls CB; 49 Chad Williams SS; Special teams (ST): 59 Joe Maese LS; 9 Wade Richey K; 3 Matt Stover K; 15 Dave Zastudil P	Practice squad: 27 Calvin Carlyle CB; 65 Drew Caylor C; 17 Todd Devoe WR; 71 Marques Ogden OT; 35 Tellis Redmon RB; 13 Fred Stamps WR; 63 Thatcher Szalay G; 23 Jamaine Winborne CB; Reserve: 12 Derek Abney WR (IR); 58 Peter Boulware LB (PUP); 22 Dale Carter CB (NF=Ill.); 81 Devard Darling WR (IR); 34 Ovie Mughelli FB (IR); 42 Zach Norton CB (IR); 32 Musa Smith RB (IR); 48 Trent Smith TE (PUP); -- Fred Weary CB (IR); 70 Matt Zielinski NT (IR); Rookies in italics 53 active, 10 reserve, 8 practice squad

== Preseason ==
=== Schedule ===
Week	Date	Opponent	Result	Record
1	August 12	Atlanta Falcons	W 24–0	1–0
2	August 20	at Philadelphia Eagles	L 17–26	1–1
3	August 28	Detroit Lions	W 17–6	2–1
4	September 2	at New York Giants	W 27–17	3–1

== Regular season ==
=== Schedule ===
In addition to their regular games with AFC North divisional rivals, the Ravens played against the AFC East and NFC East based on the NFL’s schedule rotation introduced in 2002, and also played against the Chiefs and the Colts, who had in 2003 finished first in the two remaining AFC divisions.

Week	Date	Opponent	Result	Record	Attendance
1	September 12	at **Cleveland Browns**	**L** 3–20	0–1	73,068
2	September 19	**Pittsburgh Steelers**	**W** 30–13	1–1	69,859
3	September 26	at **Cincinnati Bengals**	**W** 23–9	2–1	65,575
4	October 4	Kansas City Chiefs	**L** 24–27	2–2	69,827
5	October 10	at Washington Redskins	**W** 17–10	3–2	90,287
6	Bye				
7	October 24	Buffalo Bills	**W** 20–6	4–2	69,809
8	October 31	at Philadelphia Eagles	**L** 10–15	4–3	67,715
9	November 7	**Cleveland Browns**	**W** 27–13	5–3	69,781
10	November 14	at New York Jets	**W** 20–17 _{(OT)}	6–3	77,826
11	November 21	Dallas Cowboys	**W** 30–10	7–3	69,924
12	November 28	at New England Patriots	**L** 3–24	7–4	68,756
13	December 5	**Cincinnati Bengals**	**L** 26–27	7–5	69,695
14	December 12	New York Giants	**W** 37–14	8–5	69,856
15	December 19	at Indianapolis Colts	**L** 10–20	8–6	57,240
16	December 26	at **Pittsburgh Steelers**	**L** 7–20	8–7	64,227
17	January 2	Miami Dolphins	**W** 30–23	9–7	69,843
Note: Intra-divisional games are in **bold** text.

=== Week 2: vs. Pittsburgh Steelers ===
Pittsburgh Steelers (1–0) at Baltimore Ravens (0–1)

Quarter	1	2	3	4	Total
Steelers	0	0	0	13	**13**
**Ravens**	7	6	7	10	**30**

at M&T Bank Stadium • Baltimore, Maryland

- Date: September 19
- Game time: 1:00 p.m. EDT
- Game weather: Clear • 67 °F or 19.4 °C
- Game attendance: 69,859
- Referee: Walt Coleman
- TV announcers (CBS): Kevin Harlan and Randy Cross
- Pro-Football-Reference.com

Game information

Steelers

- Ben Roethlisberger
  12/20, 176 Yds, 2 TD, 2 INT
- Duce Staley
  16 Rush, 57 Yds
- Hines Ward
  6 Rec, 151 Yds, TD

Ravens

- Kyle Boller
  10/18, 98 Yds
- Jamal Lewis
  24 Rush, 62 Yds, 2 TD
- Kevin Johnson
  2 Rec, 32 Yds

Steelers starting quarterback Tommy Maddox would suffer an injury during this game, sending 2004 first-round pick Ben Roethlisberger out on the field. After the game, Roethlisberger would lead the Steelers to fourteen straight victories to end the season. Thus, this marked the only loss the Steelers suffered during the regular season.

== Standings ==
AFC North
	W	L	T	PCT	DIV	CONF	PF	PA	STK
^{(1)} Pittsburgh Steelers	15	1	0	.938	5–1	11–1	372	251	W14
Baltimore Ravens	9	7	0	.563	3–3	6–6	317	268	W1
Cincinnati Bengals	8	8	0	.500	2–4	4–8	374	372	W2
Cleveland Browns	4	12	0	.250	2–4	3–9	276	390	W1

AFC
#	Team	Division	W	L	T	PCT	DIV	CONF	SOS	SOV	STK
Division leaders
1	Pittsburgh Steelers	North	15	1	0	.938	5–1	11–1	.484	.479	W14
2	New England Patriots	East	14	2	0	.875	5–1	10–2	.492	.478	W2
3 (Note: Indianapolis clinched the AFC #3 seed instead of San Diego based upon head-to-head victory.)	Indianapolis Colts	South	12	4	0	.750	5–1	8–4	.500	.458	L1
4	San Diego Chargers	West	12	4	0	.750	5–1	9–3	.477	.411	W1
Wild cards
5 (Note: New York Jets clinched the AFC #5 seed instead of Denver based upon better record against common opponents (New York Jets were 5–0 to Denver’s 3–2 against San Diego, Cincinnati, Houston, and Miami).)	New York Jets	East	10	6	0	.625	3–3	7–5	.523	.406	L2
6	Denver Broncos	West	10	6	0	.625	3–3	7–5	.484	.450	W2
Did not qualify for the postseason
7 (Note: Jacksonville and Baltimore finished ahead of Buffalo because they each defeated Buffalo head-to-head.) (Note: Jacksonville finished ahead of Baltimore based upon better record against common opponents (Jacksonville were 3–2 against Baltimore’s 2–3 versus Pittsburgh, Indianapolis, Buffalo and Kansas City).)	Jacksonville Jaguars	South	9	7	0	.563	2–4	6–6	.527	.479	W1
8	Baltimore Ravens	North	9	7	0	.563	3–3	6–6	.551	.472	W1
9	Buffalo Bills	East	9	7	0	.563	3–3	5–7	.512	.382	L1
10	Cincinnati Bengals	North	8	8	0	.500	2–4	4–8	.543	.453	W2
11 (Note: Houston finished ahead of Kansas City based upon head-to-head victory.)	Houston Texans	South	7	9	0	.438	4–2	6–6	.504	.402	L1
12	Kansas City Chiefs	West	7	9	0	.438	3–3	6–6	.551	.509	L1
13 (Note: Oakland finished ahead of Tennessee based upon head-to-head victory.)	Oakland Raiders	West	5	11	0	.313	1–5	3–9	.570	.450	L2
14	Tennessee Titans	South	5	11	0	.313	1–5	3–9	.512	.463	W1
15 (Note: Miami finished ahead of Cleveland based upon head-to-head victory.)	Miami Dolphins	East	4	12	0	.250	1–5	2–10	.555	.438	L1
16	Cleveland Browns	North	4	12	0	.250	1–5	3–9	.590	.469	W1
Tiebreakers (Note: When breaking ties for three or more teams under the NFL's rules, they are first broken within divisions, then comparing only the highest-ranked remaining team from each division.)
