= 2009 California Redwoods season =

American football team season

- Owner: Paul Pelosi
- General manager: Rick Mueller
- Head coach: Dennis Green
- Home stadium: AT&T Park; Spartan Stadium

Results
- Record: 2–4
- Division place: 3rd
- Playoffs: did not qualify

Uniform

The 2009 California Redwoods season was the first and only season for the California Redwoods. In the United Football League's Premiere Season, the team finished with a 2–4 record and in third place. This team is now known as the Sacramento Mountain Lions.

The Redwoods played in the inaugural UFL game on October 8, which they lost to the Las Vegas Locomotives by a score of 30–17.

== Draft ==
The draft took place on June 19, 2009. Those selected were among participants in earlier workouts held in Orlando as well as Las Vegas. Once a player was picked by a team, his rights were held by that team should he elect to play in the UFL.

= Indicates player signed with team

Player	Position	College
Odie Armstrong	FB	NW Oklahoma State
Obafemi Ayanbadejo	FB	San Diego State
Shane Boyd	QB	Kentucky
Larry Brackins	WR	Pearl River CC
Kai Brown	LS	Brown
Brett Dietz	QB	Hanover
Marcus Fitzgerald	WR	Marshall
Marquies Gunn	DE	Auburn
Derrell Hutsona	RB	Washington State
Prince Kwateng	LB	Northwestern
Branden Ledbetter	TE	Western Michigan
Cory Lekkerkerker	T	California-Davis
Joe Martin	LB	San Diego State
Liam O'Hagan	QB	Harvard
Brian Rimpf	T	East Carolina
B. J. Sams	WR	McNeese State
Brian Stamper	T	Vanderbilt
Jason Stewart	NT	Fresno State
Damon Suggs	DE	Georgia Southern
Ahmad Treaudo	DB	Southern
Marviel Underwood	DB	San Diego State
Jeremy Unertl	DB	Wisconsin–La Crosse
John David Washington	RB	Morehouse
Joe West	WR	Texas-El Paso

== Staff ==
2009 California Redwoods staff
Front office: Owner – Paul Pelosi; Vice President/General Manager (UFL) – Rick Mueller; Director of Football Operations – Sid Pillai; Head coaches: Head Coach – Dennis Green; Offensive coaches: Offensive Coordinator – Mike Kruczek; Running Backs/Quality Control – Mike McDaniel; Wide Receivers/Tight Ends – Charles Collins; Offensive Line – Art Kehoe; Offense Volunteer – Steven Hoppe	Defensive coaches: Defensive Coordinator – Ricky Hunley; Linebackers – Trent Bray; Defensive Backs – Martin Bayless; Defensive Assistant – Robert Griffith; Defense Volunteer – Donnie Henderson; Special teams coaches: Special Teams Coordinator – Gary Zauner

== Roster ==
2009 California Redwoods final roster
Quarterbacks: 7 Shane Boyd; 8 Mike McMahon; 18 Liam O'Hagan; Running backs: 32 Odie Armstrong; 30 Obafemi Ayanbadejo; 29 Derrell Hutsona; 20 Cory Ross; 43 John David Washington; Wide receivers: 10 Doug Gabriel; 15 Glenn Holt; 12 B. J. Sams; 80 Sonny Shackelford; 19 Joe West; Tight ends: 84 Nate Lawrie; 82 Branden Ledbetter	Offensive linemen: 74 Steve Edwards G; 66 Cory Lekkerkerker T; 67 Matt Lentz G/C; 77 Tyler Luellen T; 65 Mike Mabry C; 69 Brian Rimpf T; 79 Isaiah Ross G; 78 Todd Williams T; Defensive linemen: 96 Paul Carrington DE; 98 Earl Cochran DE; 93 Chris Cooper DT; 95 Roderick Green DE; 97 Anthony Harris DT; 90 Jason Parker DE; 91 Pernell Phillips DT; 94 A. J. Schable DE; 99 Jason Stewart DT	Linebackers: 45 Jon Abbate MLB; 59 Johnny Baldwin MLB; 53 Kai Brown OLB; 55 Maurice Crum, Jr. OLB; 44 Liam Ezekiel MLB; 52 Prince Kwateng OLB; 54 Adrian McCovy OLB; 56 Dontarrious Thomas OLB; 51 Worrell Williams MLB; Defensive backs: 22 Ray Bass FS; 27 Brandon Harrison FS; 31 Robert Herbert CB; 24 Josh Lay CB; 26 Marcus McClinton SS; 23 Dominic Patrick SS; 21 Ronnie Prude CB; 33 Ahmad Treaudo CB; Special teams: 3 Parker Douglass K; 4 Adam Graessle P; 59 Nick Sundberg LS	Reserve lists: 95 Derrick Gray DE (IR); 44 Nick Hannah OLB (IR); 71 Louis Holmes DE (IR); 27 Norman LeJeune SS (IR); 66 Adam Speer C/G (IR); 28 Marviel Underwood FS (IR); rookies in italics 52 Active, 6 Inactive

== Schedule ==
Week	Date	Opponent	Result	Record	Venue	Attendance
1	October 8	at Las Vegas Locomotives	L 17–30	0–1	Sam Boyd Stadium	18,187
2	October 17	New York Sentinels	W 24–7	1–1	AT&T Park	6,341
3	October 22	at Florida Tuskers	L 7–34	1–2	Citrus Bowl	12,021
4	October 29	at New York Sentinels	W 20–13	2–2	Giants Stadium	10,818
5	Bye					
6	November 14	Las Vegas Locomotives	L 10–16	2–3	Spartan Stadium	4,312
7	November 19	Florida Tuskers	L 27–34	2–4	AT&T Park	6,837

== Standings ==
United Football League
	W	L	T	PCT	PF	PA	STK
y-Florida Tuskers	6	0	0	1.000	183	92	W6
y-Las Vegas Locomotives	4	2	0	.667	167	100	W3
California Redwoods	2	4	0	.333	105	134	L2
New York Sentinels	0	6	0	.000	56	185	L6

y-denotes team advanced to 2009 UFL championship game

== Game summaries ==
=== Week 1: at Las Vegas Locomotives ===
Quarter	1	2	3	4	Total
Redwoods	0	14	3	0	17
Locomotives	3	7	10	10	30

at Sam Boyd Stadium, Whitney, Nevada

- Date: October 8, 2009
- Game time: 9:00 p.m. ET
- Game attendance: 18,187
- Referee: Jon Bible
- TV announcers (Versus): Dave Sims & Doug Flutie

Game information

1st quarter

- LV – Graham Gano 33-yard field goal, 3:20

2nd quarter

- CA – Shane Boyd 4-yard run (Parker Douglass kick), 11:03
- CA – Cory Ross 4-yard run (Parker Douglass kick), 8:45
- LV – DeDe Dorsey 1-yard pass from J. P. Losman (Graham Gano kick), 0:13

3rd quarter

- LV – Adam Bergen 11-yard pass from J. P. Losman (Graham Gano kick), 11:07
- LV – Graham Gano 39-yard field goal, 8:05
- CA – Parker Douglass 26-yard field goal, 0:52

4th quarter

- LV – Graham Gano 53-yard field goal, 10:20
- LV – DeDe Dorsey 9-yard run (Graham Gano kick), 2:18

Passing

- CA – Shane Boyd – 9/22, 92 yards
- LV – J. P. Losman – 21/31, 226 yards, 2 TD

Rushing

- CA – Cory Ross – 16 att, 47 yards, 1 TD
- LV – Marcel Shipp – 17 att, 69 yards

Receiving

- CA – Joe West – 3 rec, 37 yards
- LV – Andrae Thurman – 6 rec, 76 yards

=== Week 2: vs. New York Sentinels ===
Quarter	1	2	3	4	Total
Sentinels	0	7	0	0	7
Redwoods	7	0	7	10	24

at AT&T Park, San Francisco, California

- Date: October 17, 2009
- Game time: 9:00 p.m. ET
- Game attendance: 6,341
- Referee: Jon Bible
- TV announcers (HDNet): Kenny Rice & Paul Maguire

Game information

1st quarter

- CA – Kai Brown 2-yard pass from Mike McMahon (Parker Douglass kick), 9:39

2nd quarter

- NY – Chris Barclay 2-yard pass from Quinn Gray (Piotr Czech kick), 9:04

3rd quarter

- CA – Cory Ross 1-yard run (Parker Douglass kick), 5:11

4th quarter

- CA – Parker Douglass 42-yard field goal, 11:45
- CA – John David Washington 1-yard run (Parker Douglass kick), 3:19

Passing

- NY – Quinn Gray – 12/25, 115 yards, 1 TD, 1 INT
- CA – Mike McMahon – 16/29, 145 yards, 1 TD, 2 INT

Rushing

- NY – Chris Barclay – 13 att, 13 yards
- CA – Cory Ross – 22 att, 121 yards, 1 TD

Receiving

- NY – Craphonso Thorpe – 4 rec, 31 yards
- CA – Doug Gabriel – 5 rec, 66 yards

=== Week 3: at Florida Tuskers ===
Quarter	1	2	3	4	Total
Redwoods	0	0	0	7	7
Tuskers	0	17	10	7	34

at Citrus Bowl, Orlando, Florida

- Date: October 22, 2009
- Game time: 7:00 p.m. ET
- Game attendance: 12,021
- Referee: Randy Christal
- TV announcers (Versus): Dave Sims & Doug Flutie

=== Week 4: at New York Sentinels ===
Quarter	1	2	3	4	Total
Redwoods	7	10	0	3	20
Sentinels	0	6	7	0	13

at Giants Stadium, East Rutherford, New Jersey

- Date: October 29, 2009
- Game time: 7:00 p.m. ET
- Game attendance: 10,818
- Referee: Jon Bible
- TV announcers (Versus): Dave Sims & Doug Flutie

Game information

1st quarter

- CA – Cory Ross 25-yard pass from Shane Boyd (Parker Douglass kick), 10:19

2nd quarter

- NY – Piotr Czech 36-yard field goal, 12:36
- CA – Parker Douglass 27-yard field goal, 8:09
- CA – Shane Boyd 5-yard run (Parker Douglass kick), 0:26
- NY – Piotr Czech 45-yard field goal, 0:00

3rd quarter

- NY – Christian Hopkins 5-yard pass from Quinn Gray (Piotr Czech kick), 2:17

4th quarter

- CA – Parker Douglass 44-yard field goal, 2:37

Passing

- CA – Shane Boyd – 18/23, 197 yards, 1 TD, 1 INT
- NY – Quinn Gray – 22/32, 213 yards, 1 TD

Rushing

- CA – Cory Ross – 23 att, 77 yards
- NY – LaBrandon Toefield – 12 att, 51 yards

Receiving

- CA – Cory Ross – 7 rec, 68 yards, 1 TD
- NY – Craphonso Thorpe – 9 rec, 73 yards

=== Week 6: vs. Las Vegas Locomotives ===
Quarter	1	2	3	4	Total
Locomotives	0	3	3	10	16
Redwoods	7	0	3	0	10

at Spartan Stadium, San Jose, California

- Date: November 14, 2009
- Game time: 9:00 p.m. ET
- Game attendance: 4,312
- Referee: Jon Bible
- TV announcers (HDNet): Kenny Rice & Paul Maguire

Game information

1st quarter

- CA – Cory Ross 3-yard run (Parker Douglass kick), 2:10

2nd quarter

- LV – Graham Gano 35-yard field goal, 1:04

3rd quarter

- LV – Graham Gano 39-yard field goal, 8:02
- CA – Parker Douglass 28-yard field goal, 2:27

4th quarter

- LV – Andrae Thurman 8-yard pass from J. P. Losman (Graham Gano kick), 11:53
- LV – Graham Gano 33-yard field goal, 2:01

Passing

- LV – J. P. Losman – 16/29, 199 yards, 1 TD
- CA – Shane Boyd – 21/31, 194 yards, 1 INT

Rushing

- LV – Marcel Shipp – 19 att, 66 yards
- CA – Cory Ross – 19 att, 111 yards, 1 TD

Receiving

- LV – David Kircus – 4 rec, 104 yards
- CA – Joe West – 5 rec, 44 yards

=== Week 7: vs. Florida Tuskers ===
Quarter	1	2	3	4	Total
Tuskers	10	10	0	14	34
Redwoods	10	14	3	0	27

at AT&T Park, San Francisco, California

- Date: November 19, 2009
- Game time: 9:00 p.m. ET
- Game attendance: 6,837
- Referee: Dave Cutaia
- TV announcers (Versus): Dave Sims & Doug Flutie
