= List of Central Missouri Mules in the NFL draft =

The Central Missouri Mules football team representing the University of Central Missouri (UCM), has had 12 players selected in the National Football League (NFL) since the league began holding drafts in 1936). This includes one player selected in the fifth round. The Green Bay Packers lead all teams and have drafted two Mules.

Each NFL franchise seeks to add new players through the annual NFL Draft. The draft rules were last updated in 2009. The team with the worst record from the previous year picks first, the next-worst team second, and so on. Teams that did not make the playoffs are ordered by their regular-season record with any remaining ties broken by strength of schedule. Playoff participants are sequenced after non-playoff teams, based on their round of elimination (wild card, division, conference, and Super Bowl).

== Key ==
B	Back	K	Kicker	NT	Nose tackle
C	Center	LB	Linebacker	BB	Blocking back
DB	Defensive back	P	Punter	HB	Halfback
DE	Defensive end	QB	Quarterback	WR	Wide receiver
DT	Defensive tackle	RB	Running back	G	Guard
E	End	OT	Offensive tackle	TE	Tight end
FB	Fullback				
*	Selected to a Pro Bowl				
†	Won an NFL championship				
‡	Selected to a Pro Bowl and won an NFL championship				

== Players selected ==
Year	Round	Pick	Player name	Position	NFL team	Notes
1967	13	340	Keith Browne	WR	Green Bay Packers	—
1968	13	138	Mike St. Louis	T	Washington Redskins	—
1969	17	428	Bob Sams	T	Green Bay Packers	—
1970	13	333	Larry Roberts	RB	Cleveland Browns	—
1971	15	385	Ed Coates	WR	Detroit Lions	—
1974	14	349	Walter Rhone	DB	Los Angeles Rams	—
1978	11	302	Henry Mason	WR	Baltimore Colts	—
1987	8	213	Jeff Wright	DT	Buffalo Bills	—
2001	7	207	Colston Weatherington	DE	Dallas Cowboys	—
2004	5	153	Roderick Green	LB	Baltimore Ravens	—
2006	6	176	Delanie Walker	TE	San Francisco 49ers	—
2021	5	168	Zach Davidson	TE	Minnesota Vikings	—
