= Jamaine (name) =

Jamaine is a given name.

Notable people with the name include:

- Jamaine Wray (born 1984), Jamaican rugby league footballer
- Jamaine Jones (born 1998), Australian rules footballer
- Jamaine Winborne (born 1980), American football player
- Jamaine Ortiz (born 1996), American professional boxer
- Jamaine Coleman (born 1995), British steeplechaser and middle-distance runner.

== See also ==
- Jumaine Jones (born 1979), American basketball player
- P. J. Washington (born 1998), American basketball player
