= 2006 Washington Huskies football team =

American college football season

2006 Washington Huskies football
- Conference: Pacific-10 Conference
- Record: 5–7 (3–6 Pac-10)
- Head coach: Tyrone Willingham (2nd season)
- Offensive coordinator: Tim Lappano (2nd season)
- Offensive scheme: Spread
- Defensive coordinator: Kent Baer (2nd season)
- Base defense: 4–3
- MVPs: Isaiah Stanback (O); C.J. Wallace (D)
- Captains: Dashon Goldson; Sonny Shackelford; Isaiah Stanback; C. J. Wallace
- Home stadium: Husky Stadium (Capacity: 72,500)

2006 Pacific-10 Conference football standings
| | Conf. | | | Overall |
| Team | W | | L | W | | L |
|---|---|---|---|---|---|---|
| No. 4 USC + | 7 | – | 2 | 11 | – | 2 |
| No. 14 California + | 7 | – | 2 | 10 | – | 3 |
| No. 21 Oregon State | 6 | – | 3 | 10 | – | 4 |
| UCLA | 5 | – | 4 | 7 | – | 6 |
| Arizona State | 4 | – | 5 | 7 | – | 6 |
| Oregon | 4 | – | 5 | 7 | – | 6 |
| Arizona | 4 | – | 5 | 6 | – | 6 |
| Washington State | 4 | – | 5 | 6 | – | 6 |
| Washington | 3 | – | 6 | 5 | – | 7 |
| Stanford | 1 | – | 8 | 1 | – | 11 |
+ – Conference co-champions; Rankings from AP Poll

The 2006 Washington Huskies football team represented the University of Washington in the 2006 NCAA Division I FBS football season. Led by second-year head coach Tyrone Willingham, the team compiled a 5–7 record and was ninth in the Pacific-10 Conference. Home games were played on campus at Husky Stadium in Seattle. Beginning with this season, the NCAA allowed a twelve-game regular season schedule. The Pac-10 schedule was increased from eight to nine games; each team played all nine conference opponents.

== Pre-season ==
Redshirt freshman tailback J.R. Hasty was expected to have a big impact on the offense, but was declared academically ineligible. Senior Isaiah Stanback and sophomore Johnny Durocher competed for the starting quarterback position. Junior College transfers were Anthony Atkins (DE), Jason Wells (S), and Jordan Murchison (CB). All were expected to fill holes in the team.

Washington did not appear in any pre-season rankings and was predicted to finish last in the Pac-10 media poll.

=== Pre-season awards ===
Sporting News Preseason All-Pac-10

- C.J. Wallace - All-Pac-10 First Team
- Sean Douglas - All-Pac-10 First Team
- Scott White - All-Pac-10 Second Team
- J.R. Hasty - Pac-10 Offensive Newcomer of the Year

== Schedule ==
| Date | Time | Opponent | Site | TV | Result | Attendance |
|---|---|---|---|---|---|---|
| September 2 | 12:30 p.m. | San Jose State* | Husky Stadium; Seattle, WA | | W 35–29 | 52,256 |
| September 9 | 12:30 p.m. | at No. 15 Oklahoma* | Gaylord Family Oklahoma Memorial Stadium; Norman, OK | ABC | L 20–37 | 84,577 |
| September 16 | 12:30 p.m. | Fresno State* | Husky Stadium; Seattle, WA | FSN | W 21–20 | 57,012 |
| September 23 | 12:30 p.m. | UCLA | Husky Stadium; Seattle, WA | TBS | W 29–19 | 58,255 |
| September 30 | 6:00 p.m. | at Arizona | Arizona Stadium; Tucson, AZ | | W 21–10 | 55,409 |
| October 7 | 12:30 p.m. | at No. 2 USC | Los Angeles Memorial Coliseum; Los Angeles, CA | FSN | L 20–26 | 90,282 |
| October 14 | 3:30 p.m. | Oregon State | Husky Stadium; Seattle, WA | FSN | L 17–27 | 62,656 |
| October 21 | 12:30 p.m. | at No. 11 California | California Memorial Stadium; Berkeley, CA | FSN | L 24–31 ^{OT} | 58,534 |
| October 28 | 4:00 p.m. | Arizona State^{†} | Husky Stadium; Seattle, WA | FSN | L 23–26 ^{OT} | 58,822 |
| November 4 | 12:30 p.m. | at No. 24 Oregon | Autzen Stadium; Eugene, OR (rivalry) | TBS | L 14–34 | 58,408 |
| November 11 | 12:30 p.m. | Stanford | Husky Stadium; Seattle, WA | | L 3–20 | 55,896 |
| November 18 | 3:45 p.m. | at Washington State | Martin Stadium; Pullman, WA (Apple Cup) | FSN | W 35–32 | 35,117 |
*Non-conference game; ^{†}Homecoming; Rankings from AP Poll released prior to the game; All times are in Pacific time

== Game summaries ==
=== San Jose State ===
| Team | 1 | 2 | 3 | 4 | Total |
|---|---|---|---|---|---|
| San Jose State | 6 | 3 | 6 | 14 | 29 |
| • Washington | 7 | 14 | 7 | 7 | 35 |

- Date: September 2
- Location: Husky Stadium, Seattle, WA

=== Oklahoma ===
| Team | 1 | 2 | 3 | 4 | Total |
|---|---|---|---|---|---|
| Washington | 7 | 6 | 0 | 7 | 20 |
| • Oklahoma | 7 | 6 | 17 | 7 | 37 |

- Date: September 9
- Location: Gaylord Family Oklahoma Memorial Stadium, Norman, OK

=== Fresno State ===
| Team | 1 | 2 | 3 | 4 | Total |
|---|---|---|---|---|---|
| Fresno St | 7 | 0 | 7 | 6 | 20 |
| • Washington | 7 | 7 | 0 | 7 | 21 |

- Date: September 16
- Location: Husky Stadium, Seattle, WA

=== UCLA ===
| Team | 1 | 2 | 3 | 4 | Total |
|---|---|---|---|---|---|
| UCLA | 13 | 3 | 3 | 0 | 19 |
| • Washington | 0 | 7 | 7 | 15 | 29 |

- Date: September 23
- Location: Husky Stadium, Seattle, WA

=== Arizona ===
| Team | 1 | 2 | 3 | 4 | Total |
|---|---|---|---|---|---|
| • Washington | 0 | 21 | 0 | 0 | 21 |
| Arizona | 0 | 3 | 7 | 0 | 10 |

- Date: September 30
- Location: Arizona Stadium, Tucson, AZ

=== USC ===
| Team | 1 | 2 | 3 | 4 | Total |
|---|---|---|---|---|---|
| Washington | 3 | 7 | 3 | 7 | 20 |
| • USC | 7 | 10 | 6 | 3 | 26 |

- Date: October 7
- Location: Los Angeles Memorial Coliseum, Los Angeles, CA

In the fourth quarter, with 2 seconds left on the game clock, the Huskies moved the ball 15 yards shy of the end zone, stopping the clock by getting a first down. Before Isaiah Stanback could hike the ball, the clock ran out and they were unable to get off a final play. It was a controversial moment that many blamed on miscommunication from the officials regarding when the clock would start again.

=== Oregon State ===
| Team | 1 | 2 | 3 | 4 | Total |
|---|---|---|---|---|---|
| • Oregon St | 7 | 3 | 10 | 7 | 27 |
| Washington | 3 | 14 | 0 | 0 | 17 |

- Date: October 14
- Location: Husky Stadium, Seattle, WA

Linebacker Scott White intercepted two passes in the first half, setting up two touchdowns and giving Washington a 17–10 lead by halftime. However, the Huskies struggled in the second half both offensively and defensively. Oregon State quarterback Matt Moore connected with wide receiver Sammie Stroughter to give OSU a 27–17 lead. Late in the fourth quarter, Washington quarterback Isaiah Stanback suffered a Lisfranc fracture in his right foot; the injury requires surgery and Stanback will miss the remainder of the 2006 season.

=== California ===
| Team | 1 | 2 | 3 | 4 | OT | Total |
|---|---|---|---|---|---|---|
| Washington | 3 | 7 | 0 | 14 | 0 | 24 |
| • California | 0 | 3 | 10 | 11 | 7 | 31 |

- Date: October 21
- Location: California Memorial Stadium, Berkeley, CA

Back-up quarterback Carl Bonnell made his first start of the season filling in for the injured Isaiah Stanback. In his first start he threw two touchdown passes including a 40 yard hail mary pass to Marlon Wood to send the game into over time. However, Bonnell also threw five interceptions in regulation, and one in over time.

=== Arizona State ===
| Team | 1 | 2 | 3 | 4 | OT | Total |
|---|---|---|---|---|---|---|
| • Arizona St | 0 | 14 | 6 | 0 | 6 | 26 |
| Washington | 0 | 3 | 3 | 14 | 3 | 23 |

- Date: October 28
- Location: Husky Stadium, Seattle, WA

=== Oregon ===
| Team | 1 | 2 | 3 | 4 | Total |
|---|---|---|---|---|---|
| Washington | 0 | 7 | 7 | 0 | 14 |
| • Oregon | 7 | 10 | 14 | 3 | 34 |

- Date: November 4
- Location: Autzen Stadium, Eugene, OR

=== Stanford ===
| Team | 1 | 2 | 3 | 4 | Total |
|---|---|---|---|---|---|
| • Stanford | 0 | 3 | 7 | 10 | 20 |
| Washington | 0 | 3 | 0 | 0 | 3 |

- Date: November 11
- Location: Husky Stadium, Seattle, WA

=== Washington State ===
| Team | 1 | 2 | 3 | 4 | Total |
|---|---|---|---|---|---|
| • Washington | 0 | 14 | 14 | 7 | 35 |
| Washington St | 0 | 14 | 3 | 15 | 32 |

- Date: November 18
- Location: Martin Stadium, Pullman, WA
- Game start: 6:45 p.m. EST
- Television network: FSN

Scoring summary
| Q2 | WSU | Tardy 15 yard run (Abdollmohammodi kick) | WSU 7–0 |
| Q2 | WASH | Ellis 64 yard pass from Bonnell (Braunstein kick) | Tie 7–7 |
| Q2 | WSU | Frampton 43 yard interception return (Abdollmohammodi kick) | WSU 14–7 |
| Q2 | WASH | Rankin 8 yard run (Braunstein kick) | Tie 14–14 |
| Q3 | WASH | Reece 69 yard pass from Bonnell (Braunstein kick) | WASH 21–14 |
| Q3 | WSU | Abdollmohammodi 32 yard field goal | WASH 21–17 |
| Q3 | WASH | Ellis blocked punt returned for touchdown (Braunstein kick) | WASH 28–17 |
| Q4 | WSU | Boyd 15 yard pass from Brink (Gibson pass from Brink) | WASH 28–25 |
| Q4 | WASH | Rankin 77 yard run (Braunstein kick) | WASH 35–25 |
| Q4 | WSU | Gibson 13 yard pass from Brink (Abdollmohammodi kick) | WASH 35–32 |

== NFL draft ==
Two Huskies were selected in the 2007 NFL draft, which lasted seven rounds (255 selections).

| Player | Position | Round | Overall | Franchise |
| Isaiah Stanback | Quarterback | 4th | 103 | Dallas Cowboys |
| Dashon Goldson | Safety | 4th | 126 | San Francisco 49ers |
