= Dwan Edwards =

American football player (born 1981)

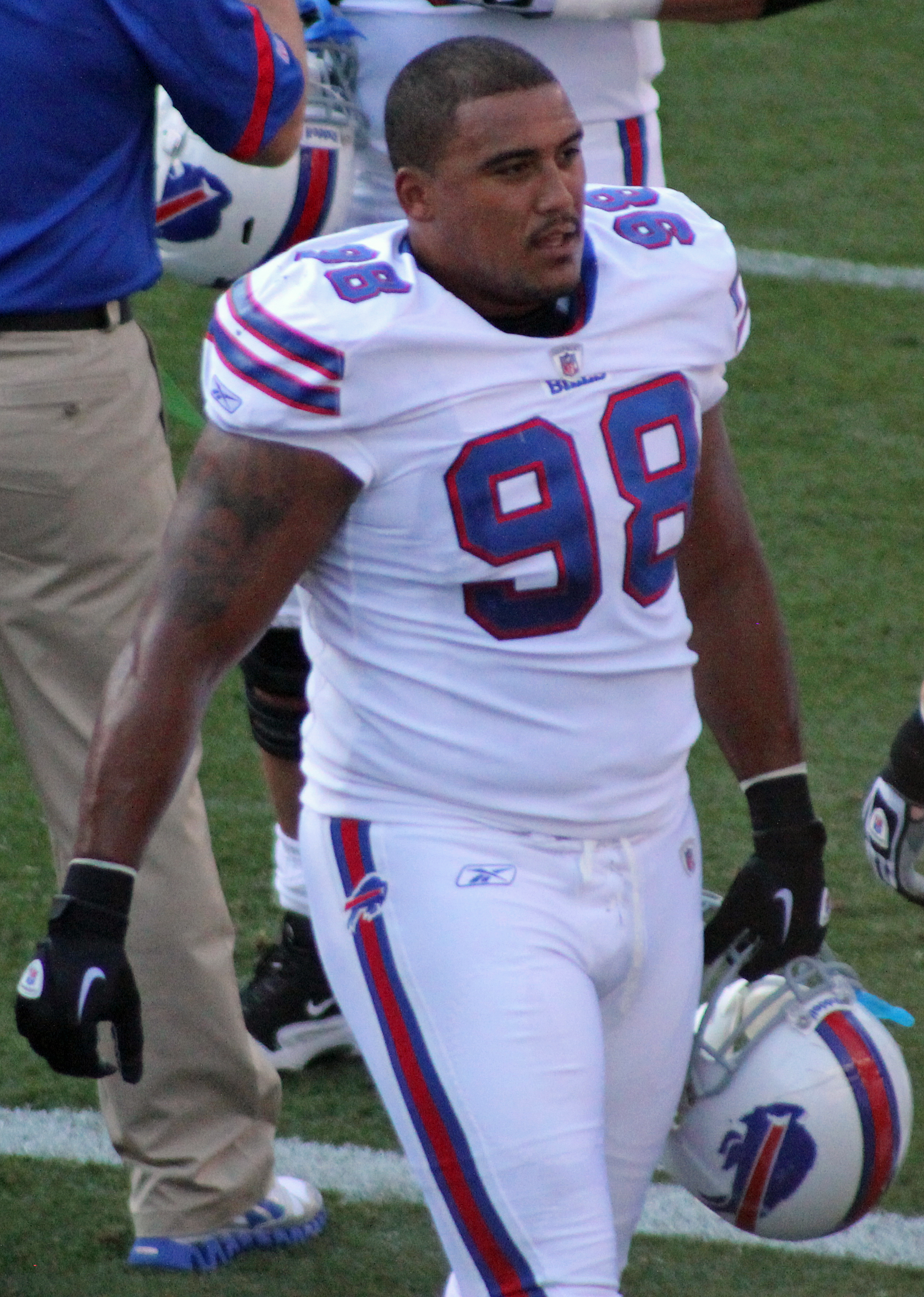
- Edwards with the Buffalo Bills in 2011

No. 92, 93, 98
- Position: Defensive tackle

Personal information
- Born: May 16, 1981 (age 45); Columbus, Montana, U.S.
- Listed height: 6 ft 3 in (1.91 m)
- Listed weight: 305 lb (138 kg)

Career information
- High school: Columbus
- College: Oregon State
- NFL draft: 2004: 2nd round, 51st overall pick

Career history
- Baltimore Ravens (2004–2009); Buffalo Bills (2010–2011); Carolina Panthers (2012–2015)

Awards and highlights
- 2× All-Pac-10 (2002–2003)

Career NFL statistics
- Total tackles: 354
- Sacks: 19.5
- Forced fumbles: 3
- Fumble recoveries: 4
- Interceptions: 3
- Defensive touchdowns: 1
- Stats at Pro Football Reference

Dwan Sedaine Edwards (born May 16, 1981) is an American former professional football player who was a defensive tackle in the National Football League (NFL). He played college football for the Oregon State Beavers and was selected by the Baltimore Ravens in the second round of the 2004 NFL draft.

== Early life ==
Edwards attended Columbus High School in Columbus, Montana. He lettered in football, basketball, and track and field, and also served as the senior class president. In football, he was a three-year starter, was a three time All-Conference honoree on both, offense and defense. In track and field, he placed third in the shot put and fourth in the discus at the District Finals.

== College career ==
Edwards attended Oregon State University. He was a two-time All-Pacific-10 Conference selection, and finished his career with 12.5 sacks, 159 tackles (30 for a loss), three fumble recoveries, two forced fumbles, and three pass deflections. He graduated in 2003 with a degree in business administration.

== Professional career ==
=== Baltimore Ravens ===
Edwards was selected by the Baltimore Ravens in the second round (51st overall) in the 2004 NFL draft. In his rookie season, he played in four games at defensive tackle and finished the season with four tackles. He made his NFL debut in the opening game of the season on September 12 at the Cleveland Browns. The following season saw Edwards get more playing time with 12 games. This was reflected in his tackle count for the season which was a career-high 38. In 2006, he saw action in eight games and finished the campaign with 12 tackles. He was hurt in the 2008 preseason, and was forced to undergo season-ending surgery. Edwards underwent a spinal fusion of the C3 and C4 vertebrae. The surgeon replaced one of his discs with a cadaver's. His contract was up in 2008 and he had to consider whether to stay or go. With little leverage after surgery, he signed a one-year deal. He became a starter in week 6 of 2009.

=== Buffalo Bills ===
On March 16, 2010, Edwards signed with the Buffalo Bills. With the team, he recorded 3.5 sacks, a forced fumble, and an interception in 2010, which Edwards returned eight yards.

=== Carolina Panthers ===
==== 2012 season ====
On September 2, Edwards signed as a free agent by Carolina after being released in the final roster cutdown by Buffalo (8/31)...Started 14 games at defensive tackle...Ranked third among NFL defensive tackles with a career-high six sacks, which equaled the second most by a defensive tackle in team history...Produced 56 tackles, eight quarterback pressures, one forced fumble and three passes defensed...Contributed to unit that ranked 10th in the NFL in total defense and ninth in sacks per pass play...Inactive with a wrist injury versus Atlanta (12/9) and at San Diego (12/16)...At Tampa Bay (9/9): Produced a single-game career-high two sacks...Caged Buccaneers quarterback Josh Freeman for losses of seven and three yards...Vs. New Orleans (9/16): Shared a two-yard sack of Saints quarterback Drew Brees with defensive end Thomas Keiser...Vs. New York Giants (9/20): Accounted for a sack and forced fumble on the same play, hitting Giants quarterback David Carr and knocking the ball out of his hand for a six-yard loss...At Chicago (10/28): Gathered a four-yard sack of Bears quarterback Jay Cutler...At Washington (11/4): Combined with defensive end Charles Johnson on a seven-yard sack of Redskins quarterback Robert Griffin III...Vs. Oakland (12/23): Wrapped up Raiders quarterback Matt Leinart for a seven-yard sack.

On September 20, 2014, Edwards was fined $8,268 for a late hit on quarterback Matthew Stafford during Week 2 against the Detroit Lions.

==== 2013 season ====
Played in 11 games with three starts and was inactive for five games for Carolina...Posted 20 tackles, three sacks, 15 quarterback pressures and two fumble recoveries...Contributed to unit that ranked second in the NFL in total defense and points allowed and led the league in sacks while finishing second in rushing defense and sixth in passing defense...Made starts in the first two games before suffering a hamstring injury at Buffalo (9/15) and was inactive for the next five games...Started the regular season finale at Atlanta (12/29) in place of an injured Colin Cole...POSTSEASON: Started NFC Divisional Playoff versus San Francisco (1/12)...Recorded two tackles and one quarterback pressure...At Buffalo (9/15): Recovered a fumble by Bills quarterback E.J. Manuel to set up a field goal...At San Francisco (11/10): Equaled career high with two sacks...Dropped 49ers quarterback Colin Kaepernick for losses of four and six yards...Part of defense that limited 49ers to 151 total net yards and 46 net passing yards, recorded six sacks and forced two turnovers...At Miami (11/24): Sealed win with a 10-yard sack of Dolphins quarterback Ryan Tannehill on the last play of the game...Vs. Tampa Bay (12/1): Recovered a fumble by Buccaneers quarterback Mike Glennon to end a Tampa Bay drive in the red zone...Takeaway led to a field goal.

==== 2014 season ====
Played in 16 games for Carolina...Tied for third on the team with four sacks and ranked third with 15 quarterback pressures...Posted 39 tackles, one interception and one pass defensed...Key member of unit that finished in the top 10 in the NFL in total defense for the third consecutive year, rating 10th...POSTSEASON: Played in NFC Wild Card versus Arizona (1/3) and NFC Divisional Playoff at Seattle (1/10)...Recorded four tackles, one sack and two quarterback pressures...At Tampa Bay (9/7): Sacked Buccaneers quarterback Josh McCown for a nine-yard loss...Vs. Detroit (9/14): Notched fourth career multi-sack game with 1.5 sacks...Corralled Lions quarterback Matthew Stafford for a five-yard sack and shared a 15-yard sack with defensive end Mario Addison...Vs. Chicago (10/5): Combined with Addison for an 11-yard sack of Bears quarterback Jay Cutler...Vs. New Orleans (10/30): Captured Saints quarterback Drew Brees for a six-yard sack...Ended Saints scoring threat by intercepting a Brees pass that careened off wide receiver Kenny Stills...NFC Wild Card vs. Arizona (1/3): Dropped Cardinals quarterback Ryan Lindley for an eight-yard sack...Part of defense that set an NFL record for the fewest yards allowed in a postseason game with 78.

==== 2015 season ====
Just hours before the free agency opened, Edwards signed a two-year contract with the Panthers.

On February 7, 2016, Edwards was part of the Panthers team that played in Super Bowl 50. In the game, the Panthers fell to the Denver Broncos by a score of 24–10.

== Personal life ==
Every summer, Edwards partners with John L. Smith to coach and run a football camp in Billings, Montana.

== NFL career statistics ==
Legend
	Led the league
**Bold**	Career high

=== Regular season ===
Year	Team	Games		Tackles					Interceptions					Fumbles			
Year	Team	GP	GS	Cmb	Solo	Ast	Sck	TFL	Int	Yds	TD	Lng	PD	FF	FR	Yds	TD
2004	BAL	4	0	1	1	0	0.0	0	0	0	0	0	0	0	0	0	0
2005	BAL	12	1	24	17	7	0.0	0	0	0	0	0	0	**1**	0	0	0
2006	BAL	8	0	7	7	0	0.0	1	0	0	0	0	1	0	0	0	0
2007	BAL	**16**	13	41	30	11	1.0	2	**1**	1	0	1	**2**	0	0	0	0
2009	BAL	**16**	9	47	**35**	12	1.0	3	0	0	0	0	1	0	**2**	0	**1**
2010	BUF	11	11	**57**	31	**26**	1.0	2	**1**	8	0	8	**2**	**1**	0	0	0
2011	BUF	**16**	13	52	29	23	2.5	3	0	0	0	0	0	0	0	0	0
2012	CAR	14	**14**	52	27	25	**6.0**	**7**	0	0	0	0	1	**1**	0	0	0
2013	CAR	11	3	19	12	7	3.0	3	0	0	0	0	0	0	**2**	0	0
2014	CAR	**16**	0	40	24	16	4.0	**7**	**1**	**24**	0	**24**	**2**	0	0	0	0
2015	CAR	12	0	14	8	6	1.0	1	0	0	0	0	0	0	0	0	0
Career		136	64	354	221	133	19.5	29	3	33	0	24	9	3	4	0	1

=== Playoffs ===
Year	Team	Games		Tackles					Interceptions					Fumbles			
Year	Team	GP	GS	Cmb	Solo	Ast	Sck	TFL	Int	Yds	TD	Lng	PD	FF	FR	Yds	TD
2006	BAL	1	0	0	0	0	0.0	0	0	0	0	0	0	0	0	0	0
2009	BAL	2	**1**	**8**	**7**	**1**	**1.0**	**1**	0	0	0	0	0	0	0	0	0
2013	CAR	1	**1**	2	1	**1**	0.0	**1**	0	0	0	0	0	0	0	0	0
2014	CAR	2	0	3	3	0	**1.0**	**1**	0	0	0	0	0	0	0	0	0
2015	CAR	**3**	0	2	2	0	**1.0**	**1**	0	0	0	0	**1**	0	0	0	0
Career		9	2	15	13	2	3.0	4	0	0	0	0	1	0	0	0	0
