= Dave Zastudil =

American football player (born 1978)

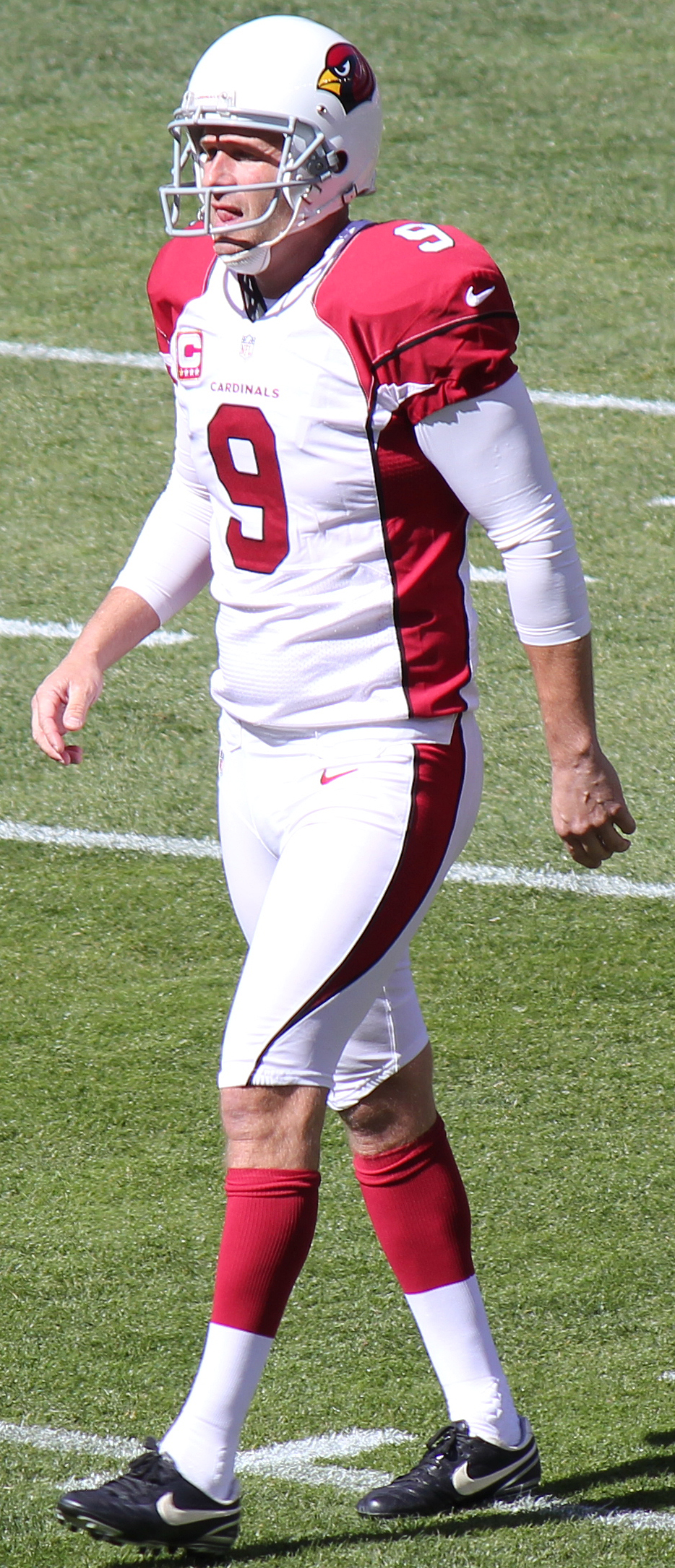
- Zastudil with the Arizona Cardinals in 2014

No. 15, 9
- Position: Punter

Personal information
- Born: October 26, 1978 (age 48); Bay Village, Ohio, U.S.
- Listed height: 6 ft 3 in (1.91 m)
- Listed weight: 220 lb (100 kg)

Career information
- High school: Bay (Bay Village)
- College: Ohio
- NFL draft: 2002: 4th round, 112th overall pick

Career history
- Baltimore Ravens (2002–2005); Cleveland Browns (2006–2010); Arizona Cardinals (2011–2014)

Awards and highlights
- NFL punting yards leader (2012); PFWA All-Rookie Team (2002); First-team All-American (2001); 2× MAC Special Teams Player of the Year (1999, 2001); 4× First-team All-MAC (1998, 1999, 2000, 2001); NFL records: Most punting yards in a season: 5,209 (2012); Most punts inside the 20 in a season: 46 (2012)

Career NFL statistics
- Punts: 869
- Punting yards: 38,016
- Punting yards average: 43.7
- Inside 20: 285
- Stats at Pro Football Reference

David Michael Zastudil (born October 26, 1978) is an American former professional football player who was a punter in the National Football League (NFL). He played college football for the Ohio Bobcats, and was selected in the fourth round of the 2002 NFL draft by the Baltimore Ravens.

== Early life ==
Zastudil attended Bay High School in Bay Village, Ohio, where he played quarterback, punter, and placekicker and helped to lead his team to an 8–2 record during his senior year. As a senior, Dave passed for 806 yards and accumulated 2,282 yards throughout his career. He averaged 40.7 yards per kick as a senior punter with a long punt of 67 yards; he also made 19 consecutive point-after attempts, made six field goals with a long field goal of 42 yards and averaged 57 yards per kickoff. He was selected twice as an all-state and all-conference punter, and made the all-district team as a kicker and the all-conference team as a quarterback.

== College career ==
Dave graduated from Bay High School and attended Ohio University, where he led the Bobcats and the Mid-American Conference in punting for four straight years. As a senior, Zastudil was selected as a first-team All-American by Football News and the Football Writers Association of America, and was selected as a second-team All-American by the Associated Press. He was also a first-team All-Mid-American Conference selection and the MAC's special teams co-player of the year, after leading the MAC in punting four times. During his senior year, Zastudil punted 50 times for 2,280 yards with a 45.6-yard average, with 16 of those punts having come from inside the 20-yard line, seven touchbacks and a long punt of 74 yards.

As an underclassman, Zastudil was a first-team All-Mid American Conference selection as a junior (averaging 44.3 yards per punt), sophomore (43.2 yards per punt) and freshman (45.3 yards per punt). As a sophomore, he was the MAC special teams player of the year and the first-team All-MAC punter after leading the conference in punting. As a freshman, he was also named to the All-America team.

Zastudil also set the school record for the longest punt with a 75-yard punt against the Akron Zips. Dave graduated from Ohio with a double major in finance and marketing.

== Professional career ==
Pre-draft measurables
Height	Weight
6 ft 3 1/8 in (1.91 m)	222 lb (101 kg)
Values from NFL Combine

=== Baltimore Ravens ===
After graduating from Ohio University, Zastudil was eligible for the 2002 NFL draft. He was one of only two punters taken during the draft (Craig Jarrett was the other), and was selected in the fourth round with the 112th pick overall by the Baltimore Ravens. As a rookie, he punted 81 times for 41.58 average. He was named to the PFWA All-Rookie Team for the 2002 season. In his only postseason appearance of his professional career, Zastudil had eight punts for a 48.75 average in a 20–17 loss to the Tennessee Titans in the Wild Card Round.

=== Cleveland Browns ===
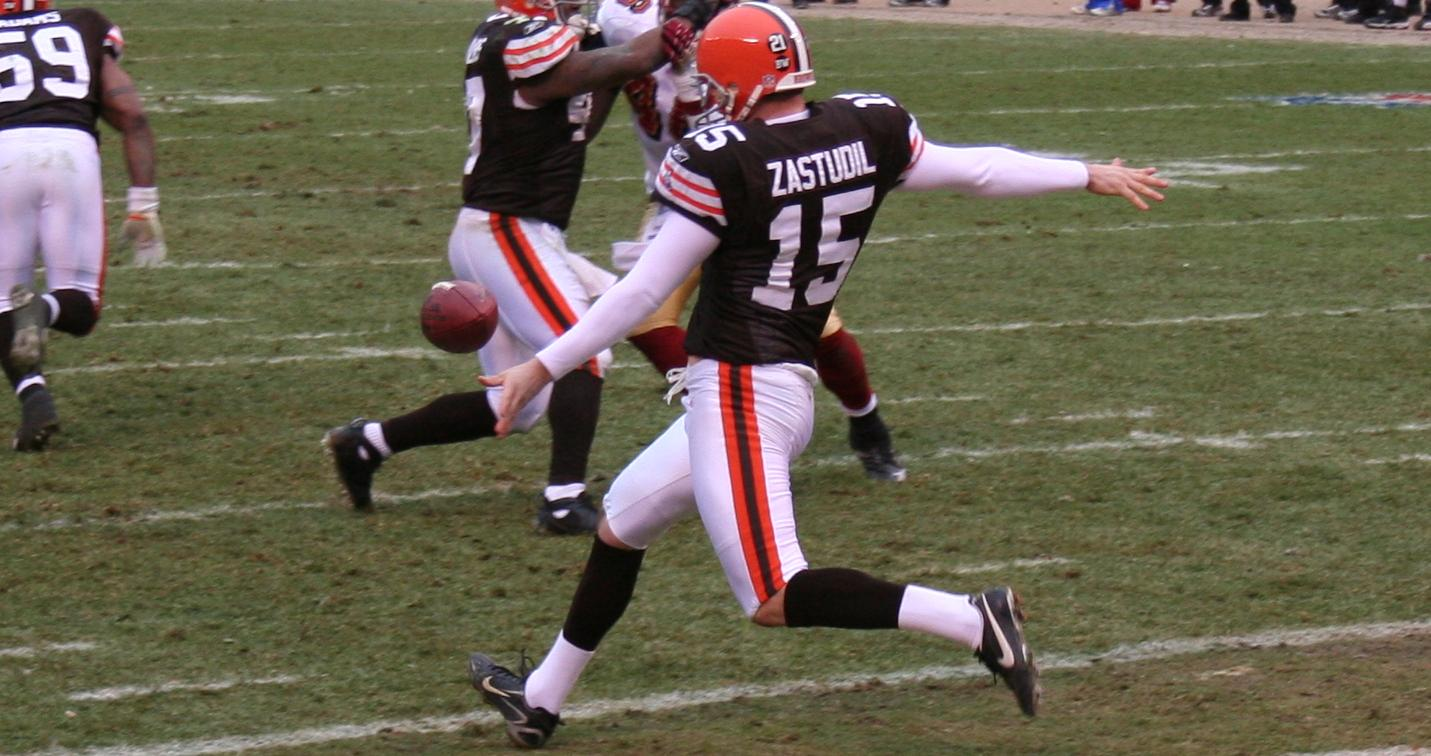
Zastudil with the Browns in 2007

On March 12, 2006, Zastudil was signed by the Cleveland Browns to the terms of a five-year contract, replacing journeyman punter Kyle Richardson. Before 2009, Zastudil had played in all but three games during his professional career; he missed those three games in 2004 after suffering a shoulder injury. In Week 5 of the 2009 season, he earned AFC Special Teams Player of the Week for his game against the Buffalo Bills, a 6–3 defensive game where he punted nine times and landed seven inside the 20. On November 18, 2009, Zastudil was put on injured reserve after a lingering knee problem. Reggie Hodges took over the punting for the Browns. The knee did not recover as well as expected after surgery, and Zastudil was placed on injured reserve again for the 2010 season on August 17, 2010. On November 16, Zastudil and quarterback Brett Ratliff were waived by the Browns.

=== Arizona Cardinals ===
Zastudil signed with the Arizona Cardinals on August 24, 2011. In the 2012 season, Zastudil set the NFL record for most net punting yards in a season with 5,209 on 112 punts, the third most in a season. In addition, he had 46 punts land inside the 20-yard line, breaking the NFL single-season record, which was originally shared by three others. On August 31, 2015, Zastudil was released by the Cardinals.

=== Career statistics ===
Year				Punting							Kickoffs
Year		G	No.	YDS	AVG	LNG	In20	TB	BLKD	No.	YDS	AVG	TB
2002	Baltimore Ravens	16	81	3,368	41.6	61	31	5	2	2	128	64.0	0
2003	Baltimore Ravens	16	89	3,649	41.0	67	21	8	0	0	0	0	0
2004	Baltimore Ravens	14	73	2,948	40.4	61	26	12	0	1	54	54.0	0
2005	Baltimore Ravens	16	84	3,653	43.5	60	11	7	1	1	16	16.0	0
2006	Cleveland Browns	16	81	3,563	44.0	61	28	7	0	0	0	0	0
2007	Cleveland Browns	12	49	2,046	41.8	64	14	4	0	0	0	0	0
2008	Cleveland Browns	16	75	3,410	45.5	65	23	11	0	0	0	0	0
2009	Cleveland Browns	8	49	2,188	44.7	60	25	5	0	0	0	0	0
2011	Arizona Cardinals	15	87	3,929	45.2	66	24	5	0	0	0	0	0
2012	Arizona Cardinals	16	112	5,209	46.5	70	46	8	0	0	0	0	0
2013	Arizona Cardinals	16	78	3,566	45.7	60	35	6	0	0	0	0	0
Totals		161	858	37,529	43.7	70	284	78	3	4	198	49.5	0

== Personal life ==
He is married to Sara Zastudil. The couple have five children. He currently resides in Bay Village, Ohio.
