= Anthony Weaver =

American football player and coach (born 1980)

Baltimore Ravens
- Title: Defensive coordinator

Personal information
- Born: July 28, 1980 (age 46); Abilene, Texas, U.S.
- Listed height: 6 ft 3 in (1.91 m)
- Listed weight: 290 lb (132 kg)

Career information
- Position: Defensive end (No. 98, 92)
- High school: Saratoga Springs (Saratoga Springs, New York)
- College: Notre Dame
- NFL draft: 2002: 2nd round, 52nd overall pick

Career history

Playing
- Baltimore Ravens (2002–2005); Houston Texans (2006–2008)

Coaching
- Florida (2010) Graduate assistant; North Texas (2011) Linebackers coach; New York Jets (2012) Assistant defensive line coach; Buffalo Bills (2013) Defensive line coach; Cleveland Browns (2014–2015) Defensive line coach; Houston Texans (2016–2020); Defensive line coach (2016–2019); Defensive coordinator & defensive line coach (2020); Baltimore Ravens (2021–2023); Defensive line coach & run game coordinator (2021); Assistant head coach & defensive line coach (2022–2023); Miami Dolphins (2024–2025) Defensive coordinator; Baltimore Ravens (2026–present) Defensive coordinator

Awards and highlights
- All-Freshman First-team by Football News (1998)

Career NFL statistics
- Total tackles: 265
- Sacks: 15.5
- Forced fumbles: 5
- Fumble recoveries: 5
- Interceptions: 3
- Stats at Pro Football Reference
- Coaching profile at Pro Football Reference

Anthony Lee Weaver (born July 28, 1980) is an American professional football coach and former player who is currently the defensive coordinator for the Baltimore Ravens of the National Football League (NFL). He previously served as an assistant coach for the New York Jets, Buffalo Bills, and Cleveland Browns, as well as the defensive coordinator for the Houston Texans and the Miami Dolphins. Weaver was a college football defensive end at Notre Dame and was drafted by the Ravens in the second round of the 2002 NFL draft. He also previously played for the Texans.

== Early life ==
Weaver was born in Abilene, Texas on July 28, 1980. He attended Saratoga Springs High School in Saratoga Springs, New York.

== Playing career ==
Pre-draft measurables
Height	Weight	Arm length	Hand span	40-yard dash	10-yard split	20-yard split	20-yard shuttle	Three-cone drill	Vertical jump	Broad jump	Bench press
6 ft 3 1/2 in (1.92 m)	296 lb (134 kg)	33 1/8 in (0.84 m)	9 3/4 in (0.25 m)	4.94 s	1.72 s	2.87 s	4.31 s	7.37 s	32.5 in (0.83 m)	9 ft 1 in (2.77 m)	24 reps
All values from NFL Combine

=== Baltimore Ravens ===
Weaver was selected by the Baltimore Ravens in the 2nd round (52nd overall) of the 2002 NFL draft. In four seasons for the Ravens, he started 54 regular season games, as well as one playoff game.

=== Houston Texans ===
In March 2006, Weaver signed a free agent contract with the Houston Texans. He spent three seasons in Houston, where he started 44 regular season games.

=== NFL statistics ===
Year	Team	GP	COMB	TOTAL	AST	SACK	FF	FR	FR YDS	INT	IR YDS	AVG IR	LNG IR	TD	PD
2002	BAL	16	29	25	4	3.5	3	0	0	0	0	0	0	0	3
2003	BAL	15	35	26	9	5.0	2	2	0	0	0	0	0	0	6
2004	BAL	16	39	35	4	4.0	0	1	0	1	1	1	1	0	4
2005	BAL	10	33	28	5	2.0	0	1	0	0	0	0	0	0	0
2006	HOU	15	35	26	9	1.0	0	1	0	1	21	21	21	0	6
2007	HOU	15	41	32	9	0.0	0	0	0	0	0	0	0	0	0
2008	HOU	16	45	28	17	0.0	0	0	0	1	8	8	8	0	1
Career		103	257	200	57	15.5	5	5	0	3	30	10	21	0	20

== Coaching career ==
=== College coaching ===
==== Florida ====
In 2010, Weaver was hired as a defensive graduate assistant at the University of Florida by Urban Meyer.

==== North Texas ====
When defensive line coach Dan McCarney took the head coaching job at the University of North Texas, Weaver was named interim defensive line coach for the Outback Bowl. Shortly after the bowl game, Weaver reunited with McCarney as the linebackers coach for the Mean Green.

=== NFL ===
==== New York Jets ====
In February 2012, Weaver was hired by the New York Jets as their assistant defensive line coach under head coach Rex Ryan. Weaver previously played for Ryan for four years as a Raven.

==== Buffalo Bills ====
In January 2013, Weaver was hired by the Buffalo Bills as their defensive line coach under head coach Doug Marrone.

==== Houston Texans ====
In 2016, Weaver was hired by the Houston Texans as their defensive line coach under head coach Bill O'Brien.

On January 20, 2020, Weaver was promoted to defensive coordinator and defensive line coach.

==== Baltimore Ravens ====
On January 22, 2021, Weaver was hired by the Baltimore Ravens as their defensive line coach and run game coordinator. In February 2022, he was promoted to assistant head coach.

In January 2024, Weaver was interviewed for the head coach position of the Atlanta Falcons, as well as the Washington Commanders.

==== Miami Dolphins ====
On February 3, 2024, Weaver was hired by the Miami Dolphins as their defensive coordinator.

==== Baltimore Ravens (second stint) ====
Weaver returned to the Baltimore Ravens on February 10, 2026, and was hired as their defensive coordinator under new head coach Jesse Minter.

== Personal life ==
Weaver is the son of Ralph and Melania Weaver. Weaver and his wife Kristin have two sons.

In 2010, Weaver was inducted into the Saratoga High Blue Streaks Hall of Fame. In 2011, he was inducted into the Capital Region Hall of Fame.
