= B. J. Sams (American football) =

American football player (born 1980)

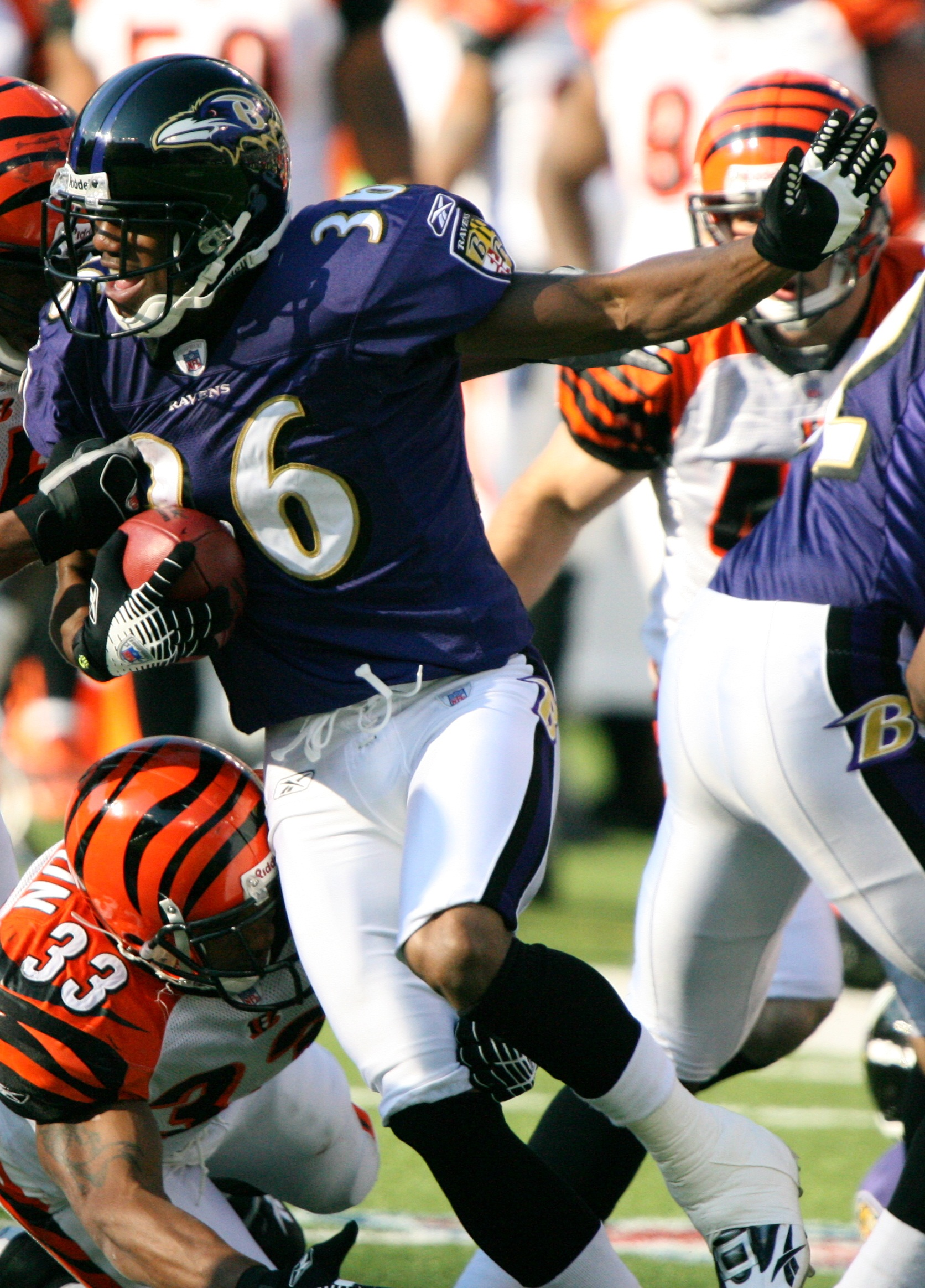
- Sams in 2006

No. 36, 30, 12
- Position: Running back

Personal information
- Born: October 29, 1980 (age 46); New Orleans, Louisiana, U.S.
- Listed height: 5 ft 11 in (1.80 m)
- Listed weight: 190 lb (86 kg)

Career information
- High school: Mandeville (Mandeville, Louisiana)
- College: McNeese State
- NFL draft: 2004: undrafted

Career history
- Baltimore Ravens (2004–2007); Kansas City Chiefs (2008); California Redwoods (2009)

Awards and highlights
- 2× First-team All-Pro (2004, 2005); NFL punt return yards leader (2004); PFWA All-Rookie Team (2004); SoCon Player of the Year (2003); NFL record: Most combined kickoff and punt returns in a season: 114 (2004; Tied with Michael Lewis, 2002)

Career NFL statistics
- Rushing attempts: 4
- Rushing yards: 19
- Rushing touchdowns: 1
- Return yards: 4,719
- Return touchdowns: 2
- Stats at Pro Football Reference

Bradley Jamar Sams (born October 29, 1980) is an American former professional football player who was a running back, wide receiver, cornerback and return specialist in the National Football League (NFL) for six seasons. He played college football at McNeese State University. He was signed by the Baltimore Ravens as an undrafted free agent in 2004, and also played for the Kansas City Chiefs and California Redwoods.

== Professional career ==
=== Baltimore Ravens ===
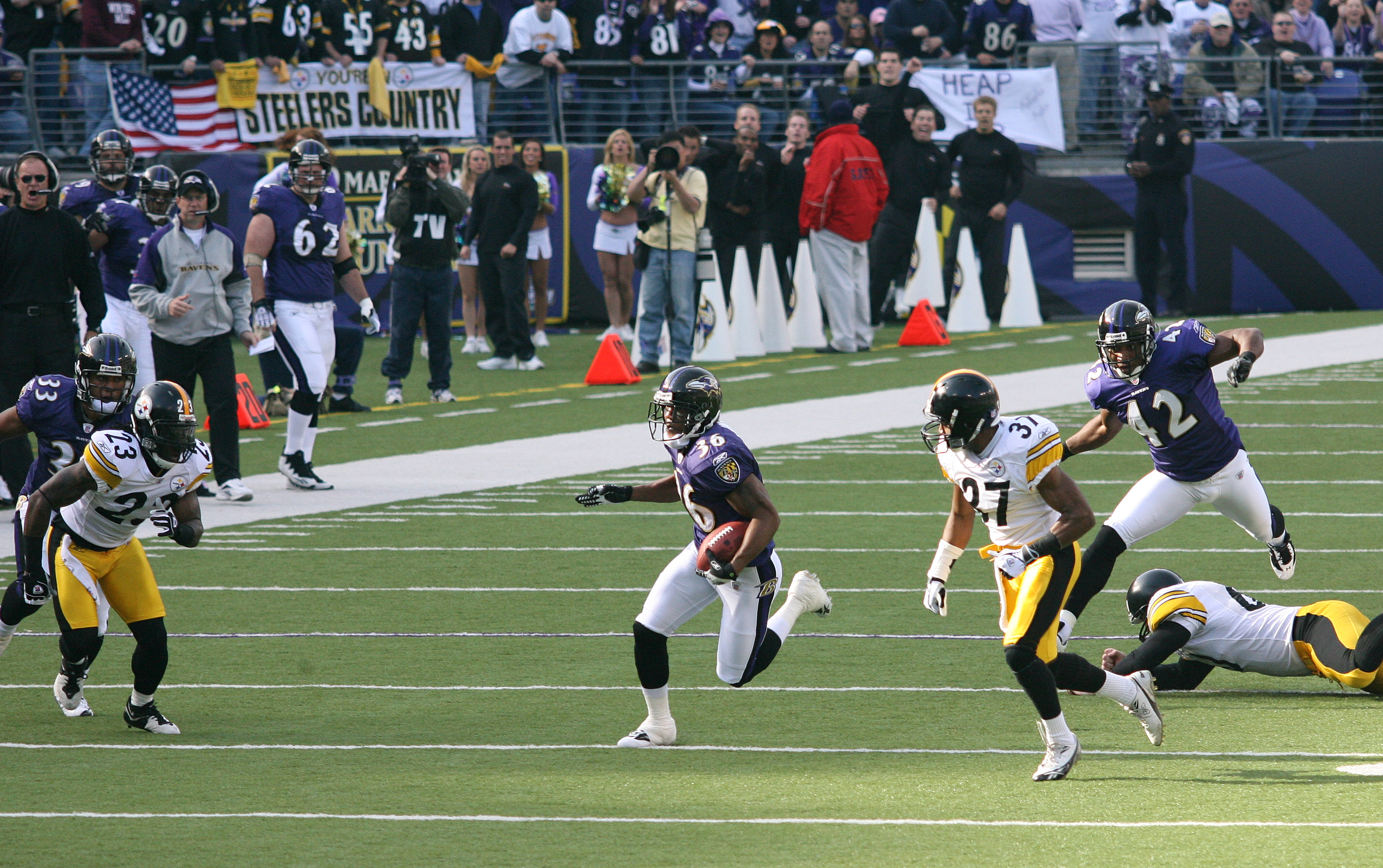
Sams (36) returns a kick against the Pittsburgh Steelers in 2006.

For the first three years of his career, Sams proved to be a valuable asset to the Ravens return game, and one of the better return men in the league. After joining the team as an undrafted free agent, his rookie season he posted 1826 total kick and punt return yards., including 2 punt return touchdowns. The following season, he missed two games, but still recorded 1,399 total return yards, with a career long of 82 yards. In 2006, he had an equally productive season, and was on pace to have the best season of his career before going down with injury in Game 12. Two weeks prior to that, against the Atlanta Falcons, he had one of the best games of his career, returning for more yards than the Falcons had rushing, combined, at 212. His best career game, his rookie season, he had 250 total yards and a touchdown against the Kansas City Chiefs.

Sams suffered a broken leg against the Cincinnati Bengals and missed the remainder of Baltimore's 2007 season. Before suffering the injury, he helped keep the team in the game with 177 return yards, though they would ultimately lose on a late flag that negated a Todd Heap touchdown.

Although he was let go following this season, in favor of Yamon Figurs, a return man who wound up being released himself in 2009, in Sams' career as a Raven prior to injury, he became the second best return specialist in Baltimore Ravens history, with 4,481 total return yards in just over three seasons. That mark is second only to Jermaine Lewis, who was the team's all-time leading return man, with 5,883 regular season return yards in six seasons.

His rookie season mark of 1,251 kick return yards, still stands as the best single season kick return total in team history.

=== Kansas City Chiefs ===
On April 9, 2008, Sams signed a one-year contract with the Kansas City Chiefs. He was released four games into the regular season on October 1 after the team signed wide receiver Mark Bradley.

=== California Redwoods ===
Sams was selected by the California Redwoods of the United Football League in the UFL Premiere Season Draft in 2009. He signed with the team on August 18.

He led the UFL's inaugural season as the league's leading kick returner, with 375 yards.

=== NFL statistics ===
Returning stats

Year	Team	Games	Punt return attempts	Punt return yards	Punts returned for touchdown	Punts fair caught	Longest punt return	Kickoff return attempts	Kickoff return yards	Kickoffs returned for touchdown	Kickoffs fair caught	Longest kickoff return
2004	BAL	16	55	575	2	12	78	59	1,251	0	0	64
2005	BAL	14	33	401	0	10	51	44	998	0	1	87
2006	BAL	12	29	307	0	4	65	30	772	0	0	72
2007	BAL	1	4	37	0	0	16	5	140	0	0	47
2008	KC	3	7	58	0	3	16	9	180	0	0	36
Career		46	128	1,378	2	29	78	147	3,341	0	1	87
