= Ahmad Treaudo =

American gridiron football player (born 1982)

No. 37, 33
- Position: Cornerback

Personal information
- Born: April 15, 1982 (age 44); New Orleans, Louisiana, U.S.
- Listed height: 5 ft 10 in (1.78 m)
- Listed weight: 181 lb (82 kg)

Career information
- High school: Warren Easton (New Orleans)
- College: Delta State; Southern
- NFL draft: 2005: undrafted

Career history
- New York Giants (2005)*; San Francisco 49ers (2005)*; Atlanta Falcons (2005); Minnesota Vikings (2006)*; New Orleans VooDoo (2007)*; Edmonton Eskimos (2007)*; Sacramento Mountain Lions (2009)
- * Offseason or practice squad member only

Career NFL statistics
- Games played: 1
- Total tackles: 1
- Stats at Pro Football Reference

Ahmad Rashad Treaudo (born April 15, 1982) is an American former professional football player who was a cornerback in the National Football League (NFL). He was signed by the New York Giants as an undrafted free agent in 2005. He spent his redshirt freshman season with the Delta State Statesmen in 2002 and transferred to the Southern Jaguars in Baton Rouge, Louisiana, where he completed his college football career before being picked up as an undrafted free agent.

Treaudo was also a member of the San Francisco 49ers, Atlanta Falcons, Minnesota Vikings, New Orleans VooDoo and Edmonton Eskimos.

== Professional career ==
Treaudo was signed by the California Redwoods of the United Football League on August 18, 2009.
