= Branden Ledbetter =

American football player (born 1986)

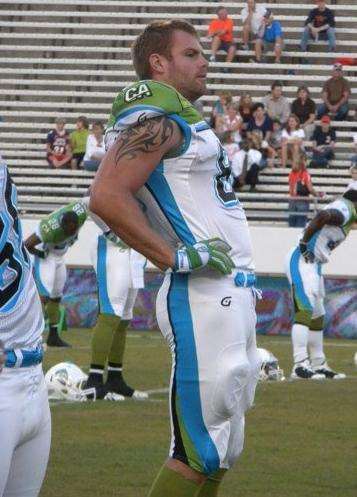
- Ledbetter in 2009

No. 82
- Position: Tight end

Personal information
- Born: May 2, 1986 (age 40); Dallas, Texas, U.S.
- Listed height: 6 ft 5 in (1.96 m)
- Listed weight: 240 lb (109 kg)

Career information
- High school: St. Thomas Aquinas (Fort Lauderdale, Florida)
- College: Western Michigan
- NFL draft: 2009: undrafted

Career history
- California Redwoods (2009); Spokane Shock (2012)*
- * Offseason or practice squad member only

Awards and highlights
- WMU all-time touchdowns record for tight ends (20); 3× All-MAC (2006, 2007, 2008); 3× John Mackey Tight End of the Week; Texas vs The Nation All-Star Game

Branden Ledbetter (born May 2, 1986) is an American former football tight end. Following his college career at Western Michigan University, he was invited to the Green Bay Packers Rookie Mini Camp as an undrafted free agent in 2009 but was cut shortly after.

== Early life ==
Ledbetter played high school football and track for Hollywood Hills High School in Hollywood, Florida, before transferring his junior year to St. Thomas Aquinas High School in Fort Lauderdale, Florida, where he graduated in 2004.

== College career ==
Ledbetter played football at Western Michigan University, and was a standout tight end. During his career at Western Michigan University, he recorded 131 receptions and 1,513 receiving yards with 20 touchdowns in his career. He finished his career ranked second among tight ends in both receptions and receiving yards in school history. He is the Broncos all-time touchdown leader for tight ends with 20 touchdowns. He was also a semi-finalist in voting for the John Mackey Award (nation's best tight end) as a senior. Following Ledbetter's final season at WMU, he was invited to the Texas vs The Nation All-Star game in El Paso, Texas, where he represented WMU on the Texas team.

== Professional career ==
Ledbetter was drafted on June 18, 2009 in the inaugural 2009 UFL draft, chosen 1st pick overall by the California Redwoods of the United Football League.

Ledbetter signed with the Spokane Shock of the Arena Football League on December 12, 2011.
