= Sonny Shackelford =

American football player (born 1985)

No. 80
- Position: Wide receiver

Personal information
- Born: April 13, 1985 (age 41); Los Angeles, California, U.S.
- Listed height: 6 ft 1 in (1.85 m)
- Listed weight: 188 lb (85 kg)

Career information
- College: Washington
- NFL draft: 2007: undrafted

Career history
- San Diego Chargers (2007)*; Spokane Shock (2009)*; Mahoning Valley Thunder (2009)*; California Redwoods (2009); Sacramento Mountain Lions (2009–2010)
- * Offseason or practice squad member only

Sonny Shackelford (born April 13, 1985) is an American former football wide receiver. He was signed by the San Diego Chargers as an undrafted free agent in 2007. He played college football at Washington.

== College career ==
Shackelford played at the University of Washington.

== Professional career ==
=== San Diego Chargers ===
Shackelford signed a free agent contract in May 2007 with the National Football League's San Diego Chargers. He was waived on August 27.

=== af2 ===
Shackelford spent time with the Spokane Shock and Mahoning Valley Thunder of af2 in early 2009, but did not appear in a game.

=== California Redwoods ===
Shackelford was signed by the California Redwoods of the United Football League on August 18, 2009.
