= Zach Norton =

American football player (born 1981)

No. 42
- Position: Defensive back

Personal information
- Born: November 19, 1981 (age 44); Fort Lauderdale, Florida, U.S.
- Listed height: 5 ft 11 in (1.80 m)
- Listed weight: 183 lb (83 kg)

Career information
- High school: Jefferson County (Monticello, Florida)
- College: Cincinnati
- NFL draft: 2004: undrafted

Career history
- Baltimore Ravens (2004–2005); Hamburg Sea Devils (2005); Kansas City Chiefs (2006–2007); BC Lions (2007); Colorado Crush (2008)
- Stats at Pro Football Reference
- Stats at ArenaFan.com

Zach K'reem Norton (born November 19, 1981) is an American former professional football player who was a defensive back for one season with the Baltimore Ravens of the National Football League (NFL). He played college football for ther Cincinnati Bearcats. He was also a member of the Hamburg Sea Devils, Kansas City Chiefs, BC Lions and Colorado Crush.

== Early life ==
Norton attended Jefferson County High School in Monticello, Florida.

== Professional career ==
Norton signed with the Baltimore Ravens on April 30, 2004 after going undrafted in the 2004 NFL draft. He was released by the Ravens on June 19, 2006.

Norton spent the 2006 season with the Kansas City Chiefs. He signed a two-year contract with the team on February 12, 2007. He was released by the Chiefs in May 2007.

Norton was signed by the BC Lions on August 28, 2007. He was released by the Lions on October 2, 2007.

Norton spent the 2008 season with the Colorado Crush. He was released by the Crush on May 12, 2008.
