= Chad Williams (safety) =

American football player and coach (born 1979)

Central Arkansas Bears
- Title: Defensive coordinator & Linebackers coach

Personal information
- Born: January 22, 1979 (age 47); Birmingham, Alabama, U.S.
- Listed height: 5 ft 9 in (1.75 m)
- Listed weight: 207 lb (94 kg)

Career information
- High school: Wenonah (Birmingham)
- College: Southern Miss
- NFL draft: 2002: 6th round, 209th overall pick

Career history

Playing
- Baltimore Ravens (2002–2005); San Francisco 49ers (2006); Kansas City Chiefs (2007)*
- * Offseason or practice squad member only

Coaching
- Morehouse (2011) Defensive assistant; Jacksonville State (2012) Graduate assistant; Middle Tennessee (2013) Graduate assistant; West Georgia (2014) Linebackers coach; Valdosta State (2015) Defensive coordinator; West Alabama (2016) Special teams coordinator & defensive backs coach; Savannah State (2016–2017) Defensive coordinator & linebackers coach; Central Arkansas (2018–2020) Defensive coordinator & linebackers coach; Southern Miss (2021–2022) Cornerbacks coach; Southern Miss (2023) Inside linebackers coach; Southern Miss (2024) Linebackers coach & defensive run game coordinator; Central Arkansas (2025–present) Defensive coordinator & linebackers coach
- Stats at Pro Football Reference

Chad Kelton Williams (born January 22, 1979) is an American college football coach and former player. He is the defensive coordinator and linebackers for the University of Central Arkansas, positions he has held since 2025. He played professionally as a safety for five seasons in the National Football League (NFL).

== Playing career ==
He attended college at the University of Southern Mississippi. He played for the Baltimore Ravens from 2002 to 2005 and San Francisco 49ers in 2006. In his five years in the NFL, Williams played in 79 career games, six of which he started. He had 164 tackles and 9 interceptions. In addition, he scored three touchdowns, recorded 7 sacks, and deflected 25 pass attempts.

Williams was selected by the Baltimore Ravens in the sixth round of the 2002 NFL draft with the 209th overall pick. On May 3, 2006, he signed with the San Francisco 49ers as an unrestricted free agent. The Kansas City Chiefs signed Williams in June 2007, but he did not play for the team.

== Coaching career ==
Williams formerly served as the defensive coordinator and linebackers coach for the University of Central Arkansas.

In December 2020 it was announced that Williams would join new head coach Will Hall's inaugural staff at Williams' alma mater, Southern Miss. He was the cornerbacks coach under Hall until 2022. In 2023, he took on the role of inside linebackers and coach before the 2024 season he was promoted to linebackers coach.
