= Dick Cass =

American lawyer

- Cass in 2013

Profile
- Position: President

Personal information
- Born: January 13, 1946 (age 80); Washington, D.C.

Career history
- Baltimore Ravens (2004–2021)

Awards and highlights
- Super Bowl champion (XLVII)

Richard W. Cass (born January 13, 1946) is an American former football executive, who was the team president for the Baltimore Ravens of the National Football League. The Ravens won Super Bowl XLVII during his 18 years with the ballclub.

Cass attended Mercersburg Academy (Class of 1964). He is also a 1968 graduate of Princeton University's Woodrow Wilson School of Public and International Affairs. He was one of the university's first two young alumni trustees in 1969. He earned his Juris Doctor from Yale Law School in 1971. He began his legal career working with Wilmer Cutler & Pickering for 31 years from 1972 to 2003. He was chairman of the firm's Business Transactions Section and a member of its Management Committee.

Prior to joining the Ravens, Cass worked as counsel for the Dallas Cowboys, where he represented Jerry Jones in his acquisition of the club. He also worked as counsel for the Washington Redskins in 1999 where he represented the Jack Kent Cooke in that team's sale to Daniel Snyder as well as the central NFL offices. He was named Baltimore Ravens team president in April 2004, succeeding David Modell. He helped Steve Bisciotti in acquisition of the Ravens from Art Modell. As president of the Ravens, he oversees all aspects of the organization. He announced his retirement on February 4, 2022.
