= Pat Moriarty (American football) =

American football player and executive (born 1955)

Baltimore Ravens
- Title: Consultant

Personal information
- Born: May 19, 1955 (age 71); Cleveland, Ohio, U.S.
- Listed height: 6 ft 0 in (1.83 m)
- Listed weight: 195 lb (88 kg)

Career information
- Position: Running back (No. 25)
- College: Georgia Tech
- NFL draft: 1978: undrafted

Career history

Playing
- Cleveland Browns (1979)

Operations
- Cleveland Browns (1994–1995) Director of business operations; Baltimore Ravens (1996–2004) Chief financial officer; Baltimore Ravens (2005–2012) Vice president of football administration; Baltimore Ravens (2013–2021) Senior vice president of football operations; Baltimore Ravens (2022–2023) Senior advisor to the general manager; Baltimore Ravens (2024–present) Consultant

Awards and highlights
- As executive: 2× Super Bowl champion (XXXV, XLVII)
- Stats at Pro Football Reference

Patrick John Moriarty (born May 19, 1955) is an American professional football executive who is currently a consultant for the Baltimore Ravens of the National Football League (NFL), where he has worked since the team's inaugural season in 1996. He played college football for the Georgia Tech Yellow Jackets football and professionally for the 1979 Cleveland Browns.
