= Thatcher Szalay =

American football player (born 1979)

No. 57
- Position: Guard

Personal information
- Born: January 18, 1979 (age 47); Whitefish, Montana, U.S.
- Listed height: 6 ft 4 in (1.93 m)
- Listed weight: 303 lb (137 kg)

Career information
- High school: Whitefish
- College: Montana
- NFL draft: 2002: undrafted

Career history
- Cincinnati Bengals (2002–2004); Baltimore Ravens (2004–2005)*; Seattle Seahawks (2005)*; Baltimore Ravens (2005); Seattle Seahawks (2006)*
- * Offseason or practice squad member only
- Stats at Pro Football Reference

Thatcher David Szalay (born January 18, 1979) is an American football player. He previously played in the National Football League (NFL) for the Baltimore Ravens, Seattle Seahawks, and the Cincinnati Bengals.

Szalay played college football for the University of Montana. While there he was named to the Big Sky all-conference team three times and was a first-team Associated Press All-American. In 2019, he was inducted into the Montana Football Hall of Fame.
