= Jamaine Winborne =

American football player (born 1980)

No. 23, 28
- Position: Cornerback

Personal information
- Born: December 26, 1980 (age 45); Chesapeake, Virginia, U.S.
- Listed height: 5 ft 10 in (1.78 m)
- Listed weight: 202 lb (92 kg)

Career information
- High school: Indian River (VA); Fork Union Military Academy (VA)
- College: Virginia
- NFL draft: 2004: undrafted

Career history
- New York Giants (2004)*; Baltimore Ravens (2004–2007); Montreal Alouettes (2009)*
- * Offseason or practice squad member only

Career NFL statistics
- Games played: 17
- Total tackles: 19
- Pass deflections: 3
- Stats at Pro Football Reference

Jamaine L. Winborne (born December 26, 1980) is an American former professional football player who was a cornerback for the Baltimore Ravens of the National Football League (NFL). He played college football for the Virginia Cavaliers.

== Early life ==
Winborne attended Indian River High School, in Chesapeake, Virginia, playing for the school's football team, which won the VHSL state championship in 1995.

== Career ==
Winborne was signed by the New York Giants as an undrafted free agent in 2004. He was waived by the Giants, but later signed with the Baltimore Ravens. He played 17 games for the Ravens over two season in the NFL. He also played for the Cologne Centurions of NFL Europe, and the Montreal Alouettes of the Canadian Football League.
