= Brian Rimpf =

American football player (born 1981)

No. 69
- Position: Offensive tackle

Personal information
- Born: February 11, 1981 (age 45); Raleigh, North Carolina, U.S.
- Listed height: 6 ft 5 in (1.96 m)
- Listed weight: 319 lb (145 kg)

Career information
- High school: Leesville Road (Raleigh)
- College: East Carolina
- NFL draft: 2004: 7th round, 246th overall pick

Career history
- Baltimore Ravens (2004–2006); New Orleans VooDoo (2008); California Redwoods (2009)

Career NFL statistics
- Games played: 16
- Games started: 7
- Stats at Pro Football Reference

Brian Timothy Rimpf (born February 11, 1981) is an American former professional football player who was an offensive tackle for the Baltimore Ravens of the National Football League (NFL). He played college football for the East Carolina Pirates and was selected by the Ravens in the seventh round of the 2004 NFL draft.

Rimpf also played for the New Orleans VooDoo and California Redwoods.

Rimpf is a former teacher and head football coach at Jack Britt High School in Fayetteville, North Carolina. He is now the head coach and athletic director at Camden High School in South Carolina.

== Early life ==
Rimpf played high school football at Leesville Road High School in Raleigh. He was taught principles of business and business law at Harnett Central High School in Angier, North Carolina.

== College career ==
Rimpf played college football at East Carolina University where he was First-team All Conference USA four times in his career.

== Professional career ==
=== Baltimore Ravens ===
Played 2004–2006

=== New Orleans VooDoo ===
Rimpf played for the New Orleans VooDoo of the Arena Football League in 2008, recording one tackle.

=== California Redwoods ===
Rimpf was selected by the California Redwoods of the United Football League in the UFL Premiere Season Draft in 2009. He signed with the team on September 2.
