= Roderick Green =

American football player (born 1982)

No. 54, 95
- Position: Defensive end

Personal information
- Born: April 26, 1982 (age 44); Brenham, Texas, U.S.
- Listed height: 6 ft 2 in (1.88 m)
- Listed weight: 274 lb (124 kg)

Career information
- High school: Brenham
- College: Central Missouri
- NFL draft: 2004: 5th round, 153rd overall pick

Career history
- Baltimore Ravens (2004–2005); San Francisco 49ers (2006–2008); California Redwoods (2009)

Career NFL statistics
- Total tackles: 44
- Sacks: 12
- Fumble recoveries: 1
- Stats at Pro Football Reference

Roderick Green (born April 26, 1982) is an American former professional football player who was a defensive end in the National Football League (NFL). He played college football for the Central Missouri Mules and was selected by the Baltimore Ravens in the fifth round of the 2004 NFL draft.

Green also played for the San Francisco 49ers and California Redwoods.

== College career ==
Green played college football at the University of Central Missouri, where he recorded 114 tackles, 13 sacks and four forced fumbles. He majored in physical education.

== Professional career ==
=== Baltimore Ravens ===
Green was selected by the Baltimore Ravens in the fifth round (153rd overall) in the 2004 NFL draft. In his rookie season, he played in nine games, recording six tackles. He made his NFL debut against the Kansas City Chiefs on October 4. In 2005, Green recorded 11 tackles and notched up his first two sacks of his NFL career.

In July 2006, he was involved in an altercation at a bowling alley in which he was stabbed. Green was available to report for training camp with the Ravens, but was released in the final cut before the 2006 regular season.

=== San Francisco 49ers ===
Green was signed by the San Francisco 49ers off waivers on September 3, 2006. In his first season with the 49ers, he played nine times amassing 12 tackles and a career high 4.5 sacks. In 2007, he only posted four tackles and two sacks. On February 26, 2008, the 49ers re-signed Green preventing him from going to free agency.

=== California Redwoods ===
Green was signed by the California Redwoods of the United Football League on October 19, 2009.
