= 2011 Sacramento Mountain Lions season =

- Owner: Paul Pelosi
- General manager: Dennis Green
- Head coach: Dennis Green
- Home stadium: Hornet Stadium

Results
- Record: 1–3
- Division place: 4th
- Playoffs: did not qualify

Uniform

The 2011 Sacramento Mountain Lions season was the third season for the United Football League franchise. The team finished with a 1–3 record and fourth in the league.

== Staff ==
2011 Sacramento Mountain Lions staff
Front office: Majority Owner – Paul Pelosi; Minority Owner – Angelo Tsakopoulos; Minority Owner – George Zimmer; Minority Owner – Dave Lucchetti; Minority Owner – George Marcus; Director of football operations – Sid Pillai; Player Personnel – Robert Griffith; Head coaches: Head coach/general manager – Dennis Green; Offensive coaches: Offensive coordinator/quarterbacks – Mike Kruczek; Running backs/quality control – James MacPherson; Wide receivers – Charles Collins; Tight ends/Assistant Offensive Line – Bill Khayat; Offensive line – Robert McFarland; Offensive assistant – Kurt Beathard	Defensive coaches: Defensive coordinator/special teams Coordinator – Martin Bayless; Defensive line – Carl Hairston; Linebackers – Kurt Gouveia; Secondary – Robert Griffith; Assistant Secondary – Randy Hanson; Defensive assistant – Jeff Burris; Special teams coaches: Defensive/special teams Assistant – Steven Hoppe; Strength and conditioning: Strength and conditioning – Chris Clausen

== Roster ==
2011 Sacramento Mountain Lions final roster
Quarterbacks: 2 McLeod Bethel-Thompson; 15 Ryan Colburn; 7 Trevor Harris; Running backs: 26 Steve Baylark; 20 Cory Ross; 44 Galen Stone; 28 John David Washington; Wide receivers: 10 Otis Amey; 89 Jayson Boyd; 80 Jayson Foster; 81 Kenny Moore; 19 Joe West; 83 Aaron Woods; Tight ends: 41 Kai Brown; 85 Dominique Jones; 84 Nate Lawrie	Offensive linemen: 72 Patrick Afif T; 76 Nick Howell T; 77 Tyler Luellen T; 63 Sean Middleton C; 67 Kurt Quarterman G; 62 Erik Robertson C; 60 Matt Spanos C/G; 73 Torrin Tucker T/G; 64 Kenny Wiggins G; Defensive linemen: 96 Brian Coulter DE; 93 John Faletoese DT; 93 Jeremy Navarre DE; 90 Jason Parker DE; 91 A. J. Schable DE; 69 Jonas Seawright DT; 99 Jason Stewart DT; 98 Ekom Udofia DT	Linebackers: 55 Victor Aiyewa OLB; 59 Shawn Crable OLB; 52 Prince Kwateng MLB; 54 Ronnie Palmer OLB; 51 Mike Tauiliili MLB; 56 Dontarrious Thomas OLB; Defensive backs: 39 Victor Anderson FS; 31 Robert Bourne CB; 40 John Busing SS; 30 Manny Collins CB; 25 Terrell Maze CB; 32 Jermaine Phillips FS; 23 Will Poole CB; 21 Ronnie Prude CB; 29 Zach Schrader SS	Special teams: 57 Ryan Coulson LS; 1 Tom Malone P; 3 Jose Martinez K; Reserve lists: 45 Charles Ali RB (IR); 17 Taye Biddle WR (IR); 55 Maurice Crum, Jr. OLB (IR); 33 Andre Dixon RB (IR); 42 Aaron King LS (IR); 75 Sam Lightbody T (IR); 13 Marcus Maxwell WR (IR); 94 Eric Moncur DE (IR); 53 Clinton Snyder OLB (IR); 91 Willie Williams DT (IR); rookies in italics 51 Active, 10 Inactive

== Schedule ==
Week	Date	Opponent	Result	Record	Venue
1	September 17	Las Vegas Locomotives	L 17–23	0–1	Hornet Stadium
2	Bye				
3	October 1	Omaha Nighthawks	L 30–33	0–2	Hornet Stadium
4	October 7	at Virginia Destroyers	L 6–28	0–3	Virginia Beach Sportsplex
5	October 15	Virginia Destroyers	W 27–20 (OT)	1–3	Hornet Stadium
6	October 21 †	at Omaha Nighthawks	W 25–19	2–3	TD Ameritrade Park Omaha
* All times are Pacific Time. † Postseason Consolation Game.

== Standings ==
United Football League
	W	L	T	PCT	PF	PA	STK
z-Virginia Destroyers	3	1	0	.750	105	63	L1
z-Las Vegas Locomotives	3	1	0	.750	83	67	W2
x-Omaha Nighthawks	1	3	0	.250	62	96	L2
x-Sacramento Mountain Lions	1	3	0	.250	80	104	W1

z-Virginia and Las Vegas were awarded berths in the 2011 UFL championship game when the balance of the regular season was cancelled on October 17
x-Omaha and Sacramento would play in a post-season consolation game

== Game summaries ==
=== Week 1: vs. Las Vegas Locomotives ===
Week One: Las Vegas Locomotives at Sacramento Mountain Lions – Game summary

Quarter	1	2	3	4	Total
Locomotives	7	10	0	6	23
Mountain Lions	3	0	7	7	17

at Hornet Stadium, Sacramento, California

- Date: Saturday, September 17, 2011
- Game time: 7:37PM (PT)
- Game attendance: 19,938
- Referee: Dave Cutaia
- TV announcers (CSN California): Grant Napear, Jerry Glanville, Mike Pawlawski, Dan Dibley
- Source: GameBook from ufl-football.com

Game information

First Quarter

SAC - Fabrizio Scaccia 43-yd FG, 6:24 remaining 3-0 Lions
LV - Chase Clement 3-yd TD run (Aaron Pettrey kick), 5:23 remaining, 7-3 Locomotives

Second Quarter

LV - DeDe Dorsey 11-yd TD run (Aaron Pettrey kick), 13:04 remaining, 14-3 Locomotives
LV - Aaron Pettrey 21-yd FG, 0:05 remaining, 17-3 Locomotives

Third Quarter

SAC - Reggie Williams 6-yd TD pass from Ryan Colburn (Fabriz Scaccia kick), 7:16 remaining, 17-10 Locomotives

Fourth Quarter

LV - Aaron Pettrey 28-yd FG, 14:46 remaining, 20-10 Locomotives
LV - Aaron Pettrey 23-yd FG, 6:51 remaining, 23-10 Locomotives
SAC - Kai Brown 1-yd TD pass from Ryan Colburn (Fabriz Scaccia kick), 1:51 remaining, 23-17 Locomotives

Passing Leaders

LV - Chase Clement - 20/28 for 233 yards
SAC - Ryan Colburn - 26/35 for 256 yards, 2 TDs, 1 INT

Rushing Leaders

LV - DeDe Dorsey - 51 yds on 9 carries, 1 TD
SAC - Cory Ross - 48 yds on 14 carries

Receiving Leaders

LV - Adam Bergen - 6 catches for 62 yds
SAC - Reggie Williams - 6 catches for 59 yds

=== Week 3: vs. Omaha Nighthawks ===
Week Three: Omaha Nighthawks at Sacramento Mountain Lions – Game summary

Quarter	1	2	3	4	Total
Nighthawks	7	3	6	17	33
Mountain Lions	0	10	7	13	30

at Hornet Stadium, Sacramento, California

- Date: Saturday, October 1, 2011
- Game time: 4:07PM (PT)
- Game weather: 73 °F (23 °C), Sunny, Winds from SW 3 miles per hour (4.8 km/h)
- Game attendance: 17,612
- Referee: Chris Snead
- TV announcers (CSN California): Grant Napear, Jerry Glanville, Mike Pawlawski, Dan Dibley
- Gamebook from ufl-football.com

Game information

First Quarter

- OMA - Shaud Williams 1-yd TD run, (Jeff Wolfert kick), 2:24 left (Drive: 9 plays, 43 yds, 3;35) 7-0 Nighthawks

Second Quarter

- SAC - Fabrizio Scaccia 23-yd Field Goal, 7:20 left (Drive: 5 plays, 53 yards, 2:39) 7-3 Nighthawks
- SAC - Kenny Moore 5-yd TD pass from Ryan Colburn (Fabrizio Scaccia kick), 4:46 left (Drive: 5 plays, 24 yds, 2:20) 10-7 Mountain Lions
- OMA - Jeff Wolfert 54-yd Field Goal, 0:58 left (Drive: 10 plays, 44 yds, 3:48) 10-10 Tie

Third Quarter

- OMA - Jeff Wolfert 56-yd Field Goal, 10:21 left (Drive: 12 plays, 35 yds, 4:39) 13-10 Nighthawks
- SAC - John David Washington 1-yd TD run (Fabrizio Scaccia kick), 7:15 left (Drive: 7 plays, 60 yds, 3:06) 17-13 Mountain Lions
- OMA - Jeff Wolfert 42-yd Field Goal, 2:48 left (Drive: 12 plays, 36 yds, 4:27) 17-16 Mountain Lions

Fourth Quarter

- SAC - Galen Stone 11-yd TD pass from Ryan Colburn (kick failed), 13:29 left (Drive: 8 plays, 73 yds, 4:19) 23-16 Mountain Lions
- OMA - Noel Devine 1-yd TD run (Jeff Wolfert kick), 9:13 left (Drive: 5 plays, 38 yds, 1:49) 23-23 Tie
- SAC - Dominique Jones 50-yd TD pass from Ryan Colburn (Fabrizio Scaccia kick), 6:57 left (Drive: 5 plays, 69 yds, 2:16) 30-23 Mountain Lions
- OMA - Shaud Williams 9-yd TD run (Jeff Wolfert kick), 4:57 left (Drive: 5 plays, 65 yds, 2:00) 30-30 Tie
- OMA - Jeff Wolfert 39-yd Field Goal, 0:00 left (Drive: 7 plays, 44 yds, 1:59) 33-30 Nighthawks

Passing Leaders

- OMA - Jeremiah Masoli, 27-42, 283 yds, 2 INT
- SAC - Ryan Colburn, 18-29, 234 yds, 3 TD, 2 INT

Rushing Leaders

- OMA - John Griffin, 12 carries, 35 yds
- SAC - John David Washington, 14 carries, 114 yds, 1 TD

Receiving Leaders

- OMA - Chris Davis, 8 catches, 77 yds
- SAC - Kenny Moore, 5 catches, 24 yds, 1 TD

Defensive Leaders

- OMA - Stuart Schweigert, 6 tackles (5 solo, 2 assisted), 1 INT; Ricardo Colclough, 4 tackles, 1 INT
- SAC - Dontarrious Thomas, 7.5 tackles (6 solo, 3 assisted); John Busing, 5.5 tackles (4 solo, 3 assisted), 1 INT; Manny Collins, 3 tackles, 1 INT

=== Week 4: at Virginia Destroyers ===
Week Four: Sacramento Mountain Lions at Virginia Destroyers – Game summary

Quarter	1	2	3	4	Total
Mountain Lions	0	6	0	0	6
Destroyers	7	0	0	21	28

at Virginia Beach Sportsplex, Virginia Beach, Virginia

- Date: Friday, October 7
- Game time: 4:00 p.m. PT
- Game weather: 68 °F (20 °C), Clear
- Game attendance: 12,617
- Referee: Perry Havener
- Recap, Gamebook

=== Week 5: Virginia Destroyers ===
Week Five: Virginia Destroyers at Sacramento Mountain Lions – Game summary

Quarter	1	2	Total
Destroyers			0
Mountain Lions			0

=== Week 6: at Omaha Nighthawks ===
Week Six: Sacramento Mountain Lions at Omaha Nighthawks – Game summary

Quarter	1	2	Total
Mountain Lions			0
Nighthawks			0
