= 2011 Omaha Nighthawks season =

- Owner: Zach Nelson
- General manager: Rick Mueller
- Head coach: Joe Moglia
- Home stadium: TD Ameritrade Park

Results
- Record: 1–4
- Division place: 3rd
- Playoffs: TBD

The 2011 Omaha Nighthawks season was the second season for the United Football League franchise.

== Offseason ==
The team fired previous head coach Jeff Jagodzinski following the 2010 season after losing the last four games and slipping out of the playoffs. Joe Moglia, an Omaha native who had originally been assigned as head coach of the expansion Virginia Destroyers, was reassigned to Omaha to replace Jagodzinski.

The Nighthawks have also changed stadiums, moving from Johnny Rosenblatt Stadium, where they spent their inaugural season, to TD Ameritrade Park in the downtown area of Omaha.

=== UFL draft ===
2011 Omaha Nighthawks UFL draft selections
Draft order		Player name	Position	College
Round	Pick	Player name	Position	College
1	2	Reynaldo Hill	CB	Florida
2	7	Jamie Cumbie	DE	Clemson
3	12	Joe Toledo	OT	Washington
4	17	Chris Smith	CB	Northern Illinois
5	23	Mike Smith	OT	Nebraska
6	28	D. J. Jones	OT	Nebraska
7	33	Kyle Nelson	TE	New Mexico State
8	38	Jeremiah Masoli	QB	Mississippi
8	39	Brian Johnston	DE	Gardner–Webb
9	43	Derrick Locke	RB	Kentucky
10	48	Akiem Hicks	DT	Regina
10	51	Mark Herzlich	LB	Boston College

=== Hartford Colonials dispersal draft ===
- R1. Orrin Thompson, OT
- R2. Chad Nkang, LB
- R3. Kyle Calloway, OT
- R4. Lorenzo Booker, RB
- R5. Cecil Newton, C

== Staff ==
2011 Omaha Nighthawks staff
Front office: Owner – Zach Nelson; General Manager – Rick Mueller; Director of Player Personnel – Greg Mohns; Director of Football Operations – Byron Ellis; Head coaches: President/Head Coach – Joe Moglia; Offensive coaches: Offensive Coordinator – Bart Andrus; Running Backs/Tight Ends – Brock Olivo; Wide Receivers – Kevin Daft; Offensive Line – Don Lawrence; Assistant Offensive Line/Quality Control – Robert Hunt; Tight Ends/Special Teams Assistant – Jesse Thompson	Defensive coaches: Defensive Coordinator – Tom Olivadotti; Defensive Line – Brandon Noble; Assistant Defensive Line/Quality Control – Mike Gallagher; Defensive Backs – Pete Kuharchek; Special teams coaches: Special Teams – Richard Kent; Strength and conditioning: Strength and Conditioning – Andy Williams

== Roster ==
2011 Omaha Nighthawks final roster
Quarterbacks: 8 Jeremiah Masoli; 3 D. J. Shockley; 1 Troy Smith; Running Backs: 13 Maurice Clarett; 7 Noel Devine; 34 John Griffin; 21 Shaud Williams; 25 Garrett Wolfe; Wide Receivers: 88 Sam Aiken; 19 Andrew Brewer; 5 Chris Davis; 83 Chad Lucas; 85 Greg Orton; 89 Aubrey Quarles; Tight Ends: 86 Lee Vickers	Offensive Linemen: 70 Garrett Anderson C; 74 Damion Cook G; 61 Mitch Erickson G; 72 George Foster T; 71 Dan Gay T; 67 Nick Hennessey T; 57 Donovan Raiola C; 77 Greg Ryan G; 65 Orrin Thompson T; Defensive Linemen: 90 Christian Anthony DT; 99 Kevin Basped DE; 96 Walter Curry DT; 94 Dusty Dvoracek DT; 93 Claude Harriott DE; 91 Curtis Johnson DE; 92 Louis Leonard DT; 44 Jay Moore DE; 95 DeMario Pressley DT	Linebackers: 55 Angelo Crowell OLB; 56 Morlon Greenwood OLB; 51 Steve Octavien MLB; 50 Kendall Smith OLB; 49 Matt Wenger MLB; 53 Michael Wilhoite OLB; Defensive Backs: 23 Ricardo Colclough CB; 38 DeMarcus Faggins CB; 29 Virgil Gray CB; 24 Eric Green FS; 27 Vic Hall CB; 42 Clinton Hart SS; 22 Reynaldo Hill CB; 20 Stuart Schweigert FS; 32 Aaron Weathers SS	Special Teams: 16 Justin Brantly P; 45 Kyle Nelson LS; 6 Jeff Wolfert K; Reserve Lists: 63 Shannon Boatman T (IR); 9 Eric Crouch QB (IR); 28 Dovonte Edwards CB (IR); 17 Chad Jackson WR (IR); 2 Tom Mante P (IR); 26 Mike O'Connell FS (IR); -- Terrell Skinner FS (IR); 54 Pat Thomas MLB (IR); rookies in italics 51 Active, 8 Inactive

== Schedule ==
Week	Date	Opponent	Result	Record	Venue
1	September 15	Virginia Destroyers	L 13–23	0–1	TD Ameritrade Park Omaha
2	Bye				
3	October 1	at Sacramento Mountain Lions	W 33–30	1–1	Hornet Stadium
4	October 8	at Las Vegas Locomotives	L 10–30	1–2	Sam Boyd Stadium
5	October 15	Las Vegas Locomotives	L 6–13	1–3	TD Ameritrade Park Omaha
6	October 21 †	Sacramento Mountain Lions	L 19–25	1–4	TD Ameritrade Park Omaha
* All times are Central Time. † Postseason Consolation Game.

== Standings ==
United Football League
	W	L	T	PCT	PF	PA	STK
z-Virginia Destroyers	3	1	0	.750	105	63	L1
z-Las Vegas Locomotives	3	1	0	.750	83	67	W2
x-Omaha Nighthawks	1	3	0	.250	62	96	L2
x-Sacramento Mountain Lions	1	3	0	.250	80	104	W1

z-Virginia and Las Vegas were awarded berths in the 2011 UFL championship game when the balance of the regular season was cancelled on October 17
x-Omaha and Sacramento would play in a post-season consolation game

== Game summaries ==
=== Week 1: vs. Virginia Destroyers ===
Week One: Virginia Destroyers at Omaha Nighthawks – Game summary

Quarter	1	2	3	4	Total
Destroyers	0	17	3	3	23
Nighthawks	0	7	0	6	13

at TD Ameritrade Park Omaha, Omaha, Nebraska

- Date: Thursday, September 15
- Game attendance: 15,836
- Recap

Game information

First quarter

- No scoring

Second quarter

- VIR – Dominic Rhodes 3 yard run (Delbert Alvarado kick), Destroyers 7–0
- OMA – Chad Jackson 18 yard pass from Jeremiah Masoli (Jeff Wolfert kick), Tied 7–7
- VIR – Billy Latsko 5 yard pass from Chris Greisen (Delbert Alvarado kick), Destroyers 14–7
- VIR – Delbert Alvarado 42 yard field goal, Destroyers 17–7

Third quarter

- VIR – Delbert Alvarado 22 yard field goal, Destroyers 20–7

Fourth quarter

- VIR – Delbert Alvarado 20 yard field goal, Destroyers 23–7
- OMA – Jeremiah Masoli 5 yard run (Pass failed), Destroyers 23–13

Leading passers

- VIR – Chris Greisen – 19/35, 167 yards, 1 touchdown
- OMA – Jeremiah Masoli – 14/30, 168 yards, 1 touchdown, 2 interceptions

=== Week 3: at Sacramento Mountain Lions ===
Week Three: Omaha Nighthawks at Sacramento Mountain Lions – Game summary

Quarter	1	2	3	4	Total
Nighthawks	7	3	6	17	33
Mountain Lions	0	10	7	13	30

at Hornet Stadium, Sacramento, California

- Date: Saturday, October 1, 2011
- Game time: 6:07PM (CT)
- Game weather: 73 °F (23 °C), Sunny, Winds from SW 3 miles per hour (4.8 km/h)
- Game attendance: 17,612
- Referee: Chris Snead
- TV announcers (Cox Cable 2 [Relay of CSN California]): Grant Napear, Jerry Glanville, Mike Pawlawski, Dan Dibley
- Gamebook from ufl-football.com

Game information

First Quarter

- OMA - Shaud Williams 1-yd TD run, (Jeff Wolfert kick), 2:24 left (Drive: 9 plays, 43 yds, 3;35) 7-0 Nighthawks

Second Quarter

- SAC - Fabrizio Scaccia 23-yd Field Goal, 7:20 left (Drive: 5 plays, 53 yards, 2:39) 7-3 Nighthawks
- SAC - Kenny Moore 5-yd TD pass from Ryan Colburn (Fabrizio Scaccia kick), 4:46 left (Drive: 5 plays, 24 yds, 2:20) 10-7 Mountain Lions
- OMA - Jeff Wolfert 54-yd Field Goal, 0:58 left (Drive: 10 plays, 44 yds, 3:48) 10-10 Tie

Third Quarter

- OMA - Jeff Wolfert 56-yd Field Goal, 10:21 left (Drive: 12 plays, 35 yds, 4:39) 13-10 Nighthawks
- SAC - John David Washington 1-yd TD run (Fabrizio Scaccia kick), 7:15 left (Drive: 7 plays, 60 yds, 3:06) 17-13 Mountain Lions
- OMA - Jeff Wolfert 42-yd Field Goal, 2:48 left (Drive: 12 plays, 36 yds, 4:27) 17-16 Mountain Lions

Fourth Quarter

- SAC - Galen Stone 11-yd TD pass from Ryan Colburn (kick failed), 13:29 left (Drive: 8 plays, 73 yds, 4:19) 23-16 Mountain Lions
- OMA - Noel Devine 1-yd TD run (Jeff Wolfert kick), 9:13 left (Drive: 5 plays, 38 yds, 1:49) 23-23 Tie
- SAC - Dominique Jones 50-yd TD pass from Ryan Colburn (Fabrizio Scaccia kick), 6:57 left (Drive: 5 plays, 69 yds, 2:16) 30-23 Mountain Lions
- OMA - Shaud Williams 9-yd TD run (Jeff Wolfert kick), 4:57 left (Drive: 5 plays, 65 yds, 2:00) 30-30 Tie
- OMA - Jeff Wolfert 39-yd Field Goal, 0:00 left (Drive: 7 plays, 44 yds, 1:59) 33-30 Nighthawks

Passing Leaders

- OMA - Jeremiah Masoli, 27-42, 283 yds, 2 INT
- SAC - Ryan Colburn, 18-29, 234 yds, 3 TD, 2 INT

Rushing Leaders

- OMA - John Griffin, 12 carries, 35 yds
- SAC - John David Washington, 14 carries, 114 yds, 1 TD

Receiving Leaders

- OMA - Chris Davis, 8 catches, 77 yds
- SAC - Kenny Moore, 5 catches, 24 yds, 1 TD

Defensive Leaders

- OMA - Stuart Schweigert, 6 tackles (5 solo, 2 assisted), 1 INT; Ricardo Colclough, 4 tackles, 1 INT
- SAC - Dontarrious Thomas, 7.5 tackles (6 solo, 3 assisted); John Busing, 5.5 tackles (4 solo, 3 assisted), 1 INT; Manny Collins, 3 tackles, 1 INT

=== Week 4: at Las Vegas Locomotives ===
Week Four: Omaha Nighthawks at Las Vegas Locomotives – Game summary

Quarter	1	2	3	4	Total
Nighthawks	0	0	3	7	10
Locomotives	3	6	7	14	30

at Sam Boyd Stadium, Whitney, Nevada

- Date: Saturday October 8, 2011
- Game time: 5:00PM (PT)
- Game weather: 72 °F (22 °C), Sunny, Winds from NNE 13 miles per hour (21 km/h)
- Game attendance: 6,500
- Referee: John Bible
- Gamebook

Game information

First Quarter

- LV - Clint Stitser 24-yd Field Goal, 1:03 left (Drive: 10 plays, 74 yards, 5:49) 3-0 Locomotives

Second Quarter

- LV - Clint Stitser 34-yd Field Goal, 14:10 left (Drive: 4 plays, 1 yard, 1:09) 6-0 Locomotives
- LV - Clint Stitser 45-yd Field Goal, 3:51 left (Drive: 15 plays, 64 yards, 7;42) 9-0 Locomotives

Third Quarter

- LV - Jamie Petrowski 15-yd TD pass from Chase Clement (Clint Stitser kick), 8:47 left (Drive: 8 plays, 52 yards, 4:36) 16-0 Locomotives
- OMA - Jeff Wolfert 43-yd Field Goal, 4:00 left (Drive: 11 plays, 63 yards, 4:34) 16-3 Locomotives

Fourth Quarter

- LV - Chase Clement 6-yd TD run (Clint Stitser kick), 7:58 left (Drive: 7 plays, 68 yards, 2:53) 23-3 Locomotives
- OMA - Aubrey Quarles 21-yd TD pass from Jeremiah Masoli (Jeff Wolfert kick), 4:40 left (Drive: 10 plays, 80 yards, 3:18) 23-10 Locomotives
- LV - Marcel Shipp 28-yd TD run (Clint Stitser kick), 2:28 left (Drive: 4 plays, 37 yards, 2:28) 30-10 Locomotives

Passing Leaders

- OMA - Jeremiah Masoli, 23-41, 203 yds, 1 TD, 1 INT
- LV - Chase Clement, 21-30, 254 yds, 1 TD

Rushing Leaders

- OMA - John Griffin, 8 carries, 52 yds
- LV - Marcel Shipp, 13 carries, 78 yds, 1TD

Receiving Leaders

- OMA - Chris Davis, 9 catches, 71 yds
- LV - Andrae Thurman, 5 catches, 86 yds; Cameron Colvin, 5 catches, 48 yds

Defensive Leaders

- OMA - Stuart Schweigert, 10.5 tackles (8 solo, 5 assisted)
- LV - Wale Dada, 7 tackles (5 solo, 4 assisted); Nick Turnbull, 1 INT

=== Week 5: vs. Las Vegas Locomotives ===
Week Four: Las Vegas Locomotives at Omaha Nighthawks – Game summary

Quarter	1	2	Total
Nighthawks			0
Locomotives			0

=== Week 6: vs. Sacramento Mountain Lions ===
Week Six: Sacramento Mountain Lions at Omaha Nighthawks – Game summary

Quarter	1	2	Total
Mountain Lions			0
Nighthawks			0
