= 2011 Virginia Destroyers season =

American football league season

- Owner: Bill Mayer
- General manager: Marty Schottenheimer
- Head coach: Marty Schottenheimer
- Home stadium: Virginia Beach Sportsplex

Results
- Record: 3–1
- Division place: 1st
- Playoffs: League champions

The 2011 Virginia Destroyers season was the third season for the United Football League franchise and its first since relocating from Orlando, where they played as the Florida Tuskers. Guided by head coach and general manager Marty Schottenheimer, the Destroyers finished the truncated regular season with a 3–1 record and defeated Las Vegas 17–3 in the October 21 Championship Game for the franchise's first UFL title.

== Offseason ==
=== UFL draft ===
2011 Virginia Destroyers UFL draft selections
Draft order		Player name	Position	College
Round	Pick	Player name	Position	College
1	4	Martail Burnett	DE	Utah
2	9	Ryan Sims	DT	North Carolina
3	14	Adrian N. Peterson	RB	Georgia Southern
4	19	Aundrae Allison	WR	East Carolina
5	25	Trevor Anderson	DT	Albany
6	30	Ian Scott	DT	Florida
7	35	Joe Monteverde	TE	Richmond
8	40	Wynel Seldon	RB	Wyoming
9	45	Derek Devine	QB	Marshall
10	50	Jahi Word-Daniels	DB	Georgia Tech
10	52	Jeff Maehl	WR	Oregon

== Staff ==
2011 Virginia Destroyers staff
Front office: President – Ed Reynolds; Assistant general manager – John Wuehrmann; Director of player personnel – Bret Munsey; Head coaches: Head coach/general manager – Marty Schottenheimer; Offensive coaches: Offensive coordinator – Terry Shea; Running backs – Gerald Carr; Wide receivers – Bobby Saunders; Offensive line – Bill Laveroni	Defensive coaches: Defensive line – John Marshall; Assistant defensive line – Delbert Cowsette; Linebackers – Johnny Holland; Linebackers – James Willis; Defensive backs – Lionel Washington; Defensive Volunteer – Kurt Schottenheimer; Special teams coaches: Special teams – Mike Stock; Strength and conditioning: Strength/tight ends – Chet Fuhrman; Equipment manager - Casey Turley; PA announcer - Henry W. Ayer III

== Roster ==
2011 Virginia Destroyers final roster
Quarterbacks: 3 Derek Devine; 14 Chris Greisen; 8 Mike McMahon; Running backs: 47 Jason Davis; 42 Billy Latsko; 33 Dominic Rhodes; 25 Wynel Seldon; 22 Clifton Smith; Wide receivers: 16 Aundrae Allison; 81 Cortez Hankton; 88 Calvin Russell; 82 John Standeford; 15 Huey Whittaker; Tight ends: 86 Ronnie Ghent; 89 Michael Matthews; 80 Jamarko Simmons	Offensive linemen: 63 Adrien Clarke G; 66 Anthony Davis G; 76 Na'Shan Goddard T; 61 Brett Helms C; 73 Clint Oldenburg T; 79 Jonathan Palmer T; 78 Seth Wand T; 72 Kyle Young C; Defensive linemen: 91 Jay Alford DT; 68 McKinley Boykin DT; 93 Antwon Burton DT; 58 Joe Clermond DE; 92 Maurice Fountain DE; 69 Orien Harris DT; 99 Jonathan Lewis DT; 96 Eric Moore DE; 54 Marques Murrell DE; 94 Stylez G. White DE	Linebackers: 53 Mike Balogun MLB; 51 Darnell Bing OLB; 59 Diyral Briggs OLB; 52 Savion Frazier MLB; 55 Terrence Melton OLB; 50 Tony Taylor MLB; Defensive backs: 36 Tra Battle SS; 28 Ahmad Carroll CB; 23 Jerome Carter FS; 27 Simeon Castille CB; 41 Bryan Evans CB; 31 Reggie Jones CB; 26 Aaron Rouse SS; 24 Darius Vinnett CB; 35 Kyle Whitehurst CB; 39 DeAngelo Willingham FS	Special teams: 4 Delbert Alvarado K; 1 Matt Henry P; 49 Ryan Senser LS; Reserve lists: 53 Neal Howey MLB (IR); 92 Quentin Moses DE (IR); 70 Shane Olivea T (IR); 29 Adrian Peterson RB (IR); 20 Keiwan Ratliff CB (IR); rookies in italics 53 Active, 5 Inactive

== Schedule ==
Week	Date	Opponent	Result	Record	Venue	Attendance
1	September 15	at Omaha Nighthawks	W 23–13	1–0	TD Ameritrade Park Omaha	15,836
2	September 24	Las Vegas Locomotives	W 34–17	2–0	Virginia Beach Sportsplex	12,167
3	Bye					
4	October 7	Sacramento Mountain Lions	W 28–6	3–0	Virginia Beach Sportsplex	12,617
5	October 15	at Sacramento Mountain Lions	L 20–27 (OT)	3–1	Hornet Stadium	18,794
All times are Eastern Time.

== Standings ==
United Football League
	W	L	T	PCT	PF	PA	STK
z-Virginia Destroyers	3	1	0	.750	105	63	L1
z-Las Vegas Locomotives	3	1	0	.750	83	67	W2
x-Omaha Nighthawks	1	3	0	.250	62	96	L2
x-Sacramento Mountain Lions	1	3	0	.250	80	104	W1

z-Virginia and Las Vegas were awarded berths in the 2011 UFL championship game when the balance of the regular season was cancelled on October 17
x-Omaha and Sacramento would play in a post-season consolation game

== Game summaries ==
=== Week 1: at Omaha Nighthawks ===
Week One: Virginia Destroyers at Omaha Nighthawks – Game summary

Quarter	1	2	3	4	Total
Destroyers	0	17	3	3	23
Nighthawks	0	7	0	6	13

at TD Ameritrade Park Omaha, Omaha, Nebraska

- Date: Thursday, September 15
- Game time: 8:06 p.m. ET
- Game weather: 57 °F (14 °C), Fair
- Game attendance: 15,836
- Referee: Chris Snead
- Recap, Gamebook

Game information

First quarter

- No scoring

Second quarter

- VIR – Dominic Rhodes 3-yard run (Delbert Alvarado kick), 10:57, Destroyers 7–0
- OMA – Chad Jackson 18-yard pass from Jeremiah Masoli (Jeff Wolfert kick), 8:46, Tied 7–7
- VIR – Billy Latsko 5-yard pass from Chris Greisen (Delbert Alvarado kick), 1:50, Destroyers 14–7
- VIR – Delbert Alvarado 42-yard field goal, 0:14, Destroyers 17–7

Third quarter

- VIR – Delbert Alvarado 22-yard field goal, 0:30, Destroyers 20–7

Fourth quarter

- VIR – Delbert Alvarado 20-yard field goal, 7:30, Destroyers 23–7
- OMA – Jeremiah Masoli 5-yard run (Pass failed), 0:50, Destroyers 23–13

Leading passers

- VIR – Chris Greisen – 19/34, 248 yards, 1 touchdown
- OMA – Jeremiah Masoli – 14/29, 169 yards, 1 touchdown, 2 interceptions

Leading rushers

- VIR – Dominic Rhodes – 23 rushes, 72 yards, 1 touchdown
- OMA – Shaud Williams – 7 rushes, 41 yards

Leading receivers

- VIR – Aundrae Allison – 4 receptions, 103 yards
- OMA – Chris Davis – 8 receptions, 77 yards

Leading tacklers

- VIR – Keiwan Ratliff – 5 tackles, 3 assists
- OMA – Angelo Crowell – 6 tackles, 4 assists

=== Week 2: vs. Las Vegas Locomotives ===
Week Two: Las Vegas Locomotives at Virginia Destroyers – Game summary

Quarter	1	2	3	4	Total
Locomotives	0	0	3	14	17
Destroyers	10	14	7	3	34

at Virginia Beach Sportsplex, Virginia Beach, Virginia

- Date: Saturday, September 24
- Game time: 7:00 p.m. ET
- Game weather: 71 °F (22 °C), Rain
- Game attendance: 12,167
- Referee: Jon Bible
- Recap, Gamebook

Game information

First quarter

- VIR – Delbert Alvarado 31-yard field goal, 12:22, Destroyers 3–0 (Drive: 6 plays, 52 yards, 2:38)
- VIR – Adrian Peterson 1-yard run (Delbert Alvarado kick), 2:57, Destroyers 10–0 (Drive: 13 plays, 73 yards, 7:46)

Second quarter

- VIR – Dominic Rhodes 1-yard run (Delbert Alvarado kick), 11:04, Destroyers 17–0 (Drive: 5 plays, 37 yards, 2:48)
- VIR – Aundra Allison 35-yard pass from Chris Greisen, 3:25, Destroyers 24–0 (Drive: 8 plays, 86 yards, 4:22)

Third quarter

- LV – Clint Stitser 45-yard field goal, 9:47, Destroyers 24–3 (Drive: 4 plays, 17 yards, 1:31)
- VIR – Huey Whittaker 31-yard pass from Chris Greisen (Delbert Alvarado kick), 3:55, Destroyers 31–3 (Drive: 9 plays, 77 yards, 5:45)

Fourth quarter

- LV – Hakim Hill 9-yard pass from Brian Brohm (Clint Stitser kick), 7:21, Destroyers 31–10 (Drive: 10 plays, 84 yards, 4:37)
- LV – Saalim Hakim 5-yard pass from Brian Brohm (Clint Stitser kick), 3:26, Destroyers 31–17 (Drive: 6 plays, 45 yards, 1:18)
- VIR – Delbert Alvarado 35-yard field goal, 2:11, Destroyers 34–17 (Drive: 5 plays, 4 yards, 1:08)

Leading passers

- LV – Brian Brohm, 10/19, 111 yards, 2 touchdowns
- VIR – Chris Greisen, 18/23, 204 yards, 2 touchdowns

Leading rushers

- LV – Hakim Hill, 6 rushes, 68 yards
- VIR – Dominic Rhodes, 20 rushes, 86 yards, 1 touchdown

Leading receivers

- LV – Saalim Hakim, 2 receptions, 37 yards, 1 touchdown
- VIR – Dominic Rhodes, 6 receptions, 53 yards

Leading tacklers

- LV – Kris Griffin, 3 tackles, 5 assists
- VIR – Tony Taylor, 6 tackles, 2 assists

=== Week 4: vs. Sacramento Mountain Lions ===
Week Four: Sacramento Mountain Lions at Virginia Destroyers – Game summary

Quarter	1	2	3	4	Total
Mountain Lions	0	6	0	0	6
Destroyers	7	0	0	21	28

at Virginia Beach Sportsplex, Virginia Beach, Virginia

- Date: Friday, October 7
- Game time: 7:00 p.m. ET
- Game weather: 68 °F (20 °C), Clear
- Game attendance: 12,617
- Referee: Perry Havener
- Recap, Gamebook

=== Week 5: at Sacramento Mountain Lions ===
Week Five: Virginia Destroyers at Sacramento Mountain Lions – Game summary

Quarter	1	2	Total
Destroyers			0
Mountain Lions			0
