= 2011 Las Vegas Locomotives season =

United Football League team season

- Owner: Bill Hambrecht
- General manager: Jim Fassel
- Head coach: Jim Fassel
- Home stadium: Sam Boyd Stadium

Results
- Record: 3–1
- Division place: 2nd
- Playoffs: L UFL Championship Game

The 2011 Las Vegas Locomotives season was the third season for the United Football League franchise.

== Staff ==
2011 Las Vegas Locomotives staff
Front office: Owner – Bill Hambrecht; Owner – Rob Ryan; Director of football administration – Mike Fassel; Director of football operations – Chuck Shelton; Director of player personnel – Randy Ball; Head coaches: President/general manager/head coach – Jim Fassel; Offensive coaches: Quarterbacks – Eric Van Heusen; Running backs – Amp Lee; Wide receivers – Tim Rattay; Offensive line – Don Eck; Assistant offensive line – Ben Norton; Offensive assistant – Turk Schonert	Defensive coaches: Defensive coordinator/special teams coordinator – Larry Mac Duff; Defensive line – Kevin Wolthausen; Linebackers/assistant special teams – Dennis Therrell; Secondary – Isaac Carter; Secondary – Larry Marmie; Strength and conditioning: Strength – I. J. Gorman

== Roster ==
2011 Las Vegas Locomotives final roster
Quarterbacks: 12 Brian Brohm; 2 Chase Clement; 5 Zac Lee; Running backs: 22 Hakim Hill; 35 Bobby Rome II; 26 Marcel Shipp; Wide receivers: 80 Cameron Colvin; 18 Eddie Drummond; 10 Saalim Hakim; 85 Samie Parker; 81 Andrae Thurman; Tight ends: 87 Adam Bergen; 89 Jamie Petrowski; 84 Dezmond Sherrod	Offensive linemen: 73 Joel Bell T; 79 Jesse Boone C; 76 Branndon Braxton T; 75 Tim Duckworth G; 78 Keith Gray C; 74 Herb Taylor G/T; 77 Brandon Torrey T; 65 Tony Ugoh G; 71 Mark Wilson T; Defensive linemen: 90 Adrian Awasom DE; 91 Ryan Boschetti DT; 94 Copeland Bryan DE; 92 Josh Cooper DE; 50 Eric Henderson DE; 98 Alfred Malone DT; 53 Michael Montgomery DE; 97 Lauvale Sape DT; 95 Marcus Smith DT; 96 Montavious Stanley DT	Linebackers: 54 Kris Griffin OLB; 58 Danny Lansanah MLB; 52 Simoni Lawrence OLB; 57 Teddy Lehman MLB; 56 Brandon Moore OLB; 55 Marcus Riley OLB; Defensive backs: 43 Lewis Baker SS; 24 Wale Dada CB; 27 Marquis Floyd CB; 25 Coye Francies CB; 28 Ron Girault FS; 38 Antonio Smith CB; 23 Patrick Stoudamire CB; 21 Nick Turnbull FS; 29 Trae Williams CB; 33 Trey Young SS	Special teams: 8 Danny Baugher P; 60 Rigo Morales LS; 3 Clint Stitser K; Reserve lists: 1 DeDe Dorsey RB (IR); 34 Jamal Lewis SS (IR); 20 Brandon Sumrall CB (IR); rookies in italics 52 Active, 3 Inactive

== Schedule ==
Week	Date	Opponent	Result	Record	Venue
1	September 17	at Sacramento Mountain Lions	W 23–17	1–0	Hornet Stadium
2	September 24	at Virginia Destroyers	L 17–34	1–1	Virginia Beach Sportsplex
3	Bye				
4	October 8	Omaha Nighthawks	W 30–10	2–1	Sam Boyd Stadium
5	October 15	at Omaha Nighthawks	W 13–6	3–1	TD Ameritrade Park Omaha
All times are Pacific Time.

== Standings ==
United Football League
	W	L	T	PCT	PF	PA	STK
z-Virginia Destroyers	3	1	0	.750	105	63	L1
z-Las Vegas Locomotives	3	1	0	.750	83	67	W2
x-Omaha Nighthawks	1	3	0	.250	62	96	L2
x-Sacramento Mountain Lions	1	3	0	.250	80	104	W1

z-Virginia and Las Vegas were awarded berths in the 2011 UFL championship game when the balance of the regular season was cancelled on October 17
x-Omaha and Sacramento would play in a post-season consolation game

== Game summaries ==
=== Week 1: at Sacramento Mountain Lions ===
Week One: Las Vegas Locomotives at Sacramento Mountain Lions – Game summary

Quarter	1	2	3	4	Total
Locomotives	7	10	0	6	23
Mountain Lions	3	0	7	7	17

at Hornet Stadium, Sacramento, California

- Date: Saturday, September 17, 2011
- Game time: 7:37PM (PT)
- Game attendance: 19,938
- Referee: Dave Cutaia
- TV announcers (Cox Cable 128 Las Vegas [simulcast of CSN California]): Grant Napear, Jerry Glanville, Mike Pawlawski, Dan Dibley
- Source: GameBook from ufl-football.com

Game information

First Quarter

SAC – Fabrizio Scaccia 43-yd FG, 6:24 remaining 3–0 Lions
LV – Chase Clement 3-yd TD run (Aaron Pettrey kick), 5:23 remaining, 7–3 Locomotives

Second Quarter

LV – DeDe Dorsey 11-yd TD run (Aaron Pettrey kick), 13:04 remaining, 14–3 Locomotives
LV – Aaron Pettrey 21-yd FG, 0:05 remaining, 17–3 Locomotives

Third Quarter

SAC – Reggie Williams 6-yd TD pass from Ryan Colburn (Fabriz Scaccia kick), 7:16 remaining, 17–10 Locomotives

Fourth Quarter

LV – Aaron Pettrey 28-yd FG, 14:46 remaining, 20–10 Locomotives
LV – Aaron Pettrey 23-yd FG, 6:51 remaining, 23–10 Locomotives
SAC – Kai Brown 1-yd TD pass from Ryan Colburn (Fabriz Scaccia kick), 1:51 remaining, 23–17 Locomotives

Passing Leaders

LV – Chase Clement – 20/28 for 233 yards
SAC – Ryan Colburn – 26/35 for 256 yards, 2 TDs, 1 INT

Rushing Leaders

LV – DeDe Dorsey – 51 yds on 9 carries, 1 TD
SAC – Cory Ross – 48 yds on 14 carries

Receiving Leaders

LV – Adam Bergen – 6 catches for 62 yds
SAC – Reggie Williams – 6 catches for 59 yds

=== Week 2: at Virginia Destroyers ===
Week Two: Las Vegas Locomotives at Virginia Destroyers – Game summary

Quarter	1	2	3	4	Total
Locomotives	0	0	3	14	17
Destroyers	10	14	7	3	34

at Virginia Beach Sportsplex, Virginia Beach, Virginia

- Date: Saturday, September 24
- Game time: 4:00 p.m. PT
- Game weather: 71 °F (22 °C), Rain
- Game attendance: 12,167
- Referee: Jon Bible
- Gamebook

Game information

First quarter

- VIR – Delbert Alvarado 31 yard field goal, 12:22, Destroyers 3–0 (Drive: 6 plays, 52 yards, 2:38)
- VIR – Adrian Peterson 1 yard run (Delbert Alvarado kick), 2:57, Destroyers 10–0 (Drive: 13 plays, 73 yards, 7:46)

Second quarter

- VIR – Dominic Rhodes 1 yard run (Delbert Alvarado kick), 11:04, Destroyers 17–0 (Drive: 5 plays, 37 yards, 2:48)
- VIR – Aundra Allison 35 yard pass from Chris Greisen, 3:25, Destroyers 24–0 (Drive: 8 plays, 86 yards, 4:22)

Third quarter

- LV – Clint Stitser 45 yard field goal, 9:47, Destroyers 24–3 (Drive: 4 plays, 17 yards, 1:31)
- VIR – Huey Whittaker 31 yard pass from Chris Greisen (Delbert Alvarado kick), 3:55, Destroyers 31–3 (Drive: 9 plays, 77 yards, 5:45)

Fourth quarter

- LV – Hakim Hill 9 yard pass from Brian Brohm (Clint Stitser kick), 7:21, Destroyers 31–10 (Drive: 10 plays, 84 yards, 4:37)
- LV – Saalim Hakim 5 yard pass from Brian Brohm (Clint Stitser kick), 3:26, Destroyers 31–17 (Drive: 6 plays, 45 yards, 1:18)
- VIR – Delbert Alvarado 35 yard field goal, 2:11, Destroyers 34–17 (Drive: 5 plays, 4 yards, 1:08)

Leading passers

- LV – Brian Brohm, 10/19, 111 yards, 2 touchdowns
- VIR – Chris Greisen, 18/23, 204 yards, 2 touchdowns

Leading rushers

- LV – Hakim Hill, 6 rushes, 68 yards
- VIR – Dominic Rhodes, 20 rushes, 86 yards, 1 touchdown

Leading receivers

- LV – Saalim Hakim, 2 receptions, 37 yards, 1 touchdown
- VIR – Dominic Rhodes, 6 receptions, 53 yards

Leading tacklers

- LV – Kris Griffin, 3 tackles, 5 assists
- VIR – Tony Taylor, 6 tackles, 2 assists

=== Week 4: vs. Omaha Nighthawks ===
Week Four: Omaha Nighthawks at Las Vegas Locomotives – Game summary

Quarter	1	2	3	4	Total
Nighthawks	0	0	3	7	10
Locomotives	3	6	7	14	30

at Sam Boyd Stadium, Whitney, Nevada

- Date: Saturday October 8, 2011
- Game time: 5:00PM (PT)
- Game weather: 72 °F (22 °C), Sunny, Winds from NNE 13 miles per hour (21 km/h)
- Game attendance: 6,500
- Referee: John Bible
- Gamebook

Game information

First Quarter

- LV – Clint Stitser 24-yd Field Goal, 1:03 left (Drive: 10 plays, 74 yards, 5:49) 3–0 Locomotives

Second Quarter

- LV – Clint Stitser 34-yd Field Goal, 14:10 left (Drive: 4 plays, 1 yard, 1:09) 6–0 Locomotives
- LV – Clint Stitser 45-yd Field Goal, 3:51 left (Drive: 15 plays, 64 yards, 7;42) 9–0 Locomotives

Third Quarter

- LV – Jamie Petrowski 15-yd TD pass from Chase Clement (Clint Stitser kick), 8:47 left (Drive: 8 plays, 52 yards, 4:36) 16–0 Locomotives
- OMA – Jeff Wolfert 43-yd Field Goal, 4:00 left (Drive: 11 plays, 63 yards, 4:34) 16–3 Locomotives

Fourth Quarter

- LV – Chase Clement 6-yd TD run (Clint Stitser kick), 7:58 left (Drive: 7 plays, 68 yards, 2:53) 23–3 Locomotives
- OMA – Aubrey Quarles 21-yd TD pass from Jeremiah Masoli (Jeff Wolfert kick), 4:40 left (Drive: 10 plays, 80 yards, 3:18) 23–10 Locomotives
- LV – Marcel Shipp 28-yd TD run (Clint Stitser kick), 2:28 left (Drive: 4 plays, 37 yards, 2:28) 30–10 Locomotives

Passing Leaders

- OMA – Jeremiah Masoli, 23–41, 203 yds, 1 TD, 1 INT
- LV – Chase Clement, 21–30, 254 yds, 1 TD

Rushing Leaders

- OMA – John Griffin, 8 carries, 52 yds
- LV – Marcel Shipp, 13 carries, 78 yds, 1TD

Receiving Leaders

- OMA – Chris Davis, 9 catches, 71 yds
- LV – Andrae Thurman, 5 catches, 86 yds; Cameron Colvin, 5 catches, 48 yds

Defensive Leaders

- OMA – Stuart Schweigert, 10.5 tackles (8 solo, 5 assisted)
- LV – Wale Dada, 7 tackles (5 solo, 4 assisted); Nick Turnbull, 1 INT

=== Week 5: at Omaha Nighthawks ===
Week Five: Las Vegas Locomotives at Omaha Nighthawks – Game summary

Quarter	1	2	Total
Locomotives			0
Nighthawks			0
