= McLeod Bethel-Thompson =

American gridiron football player (born 1988)

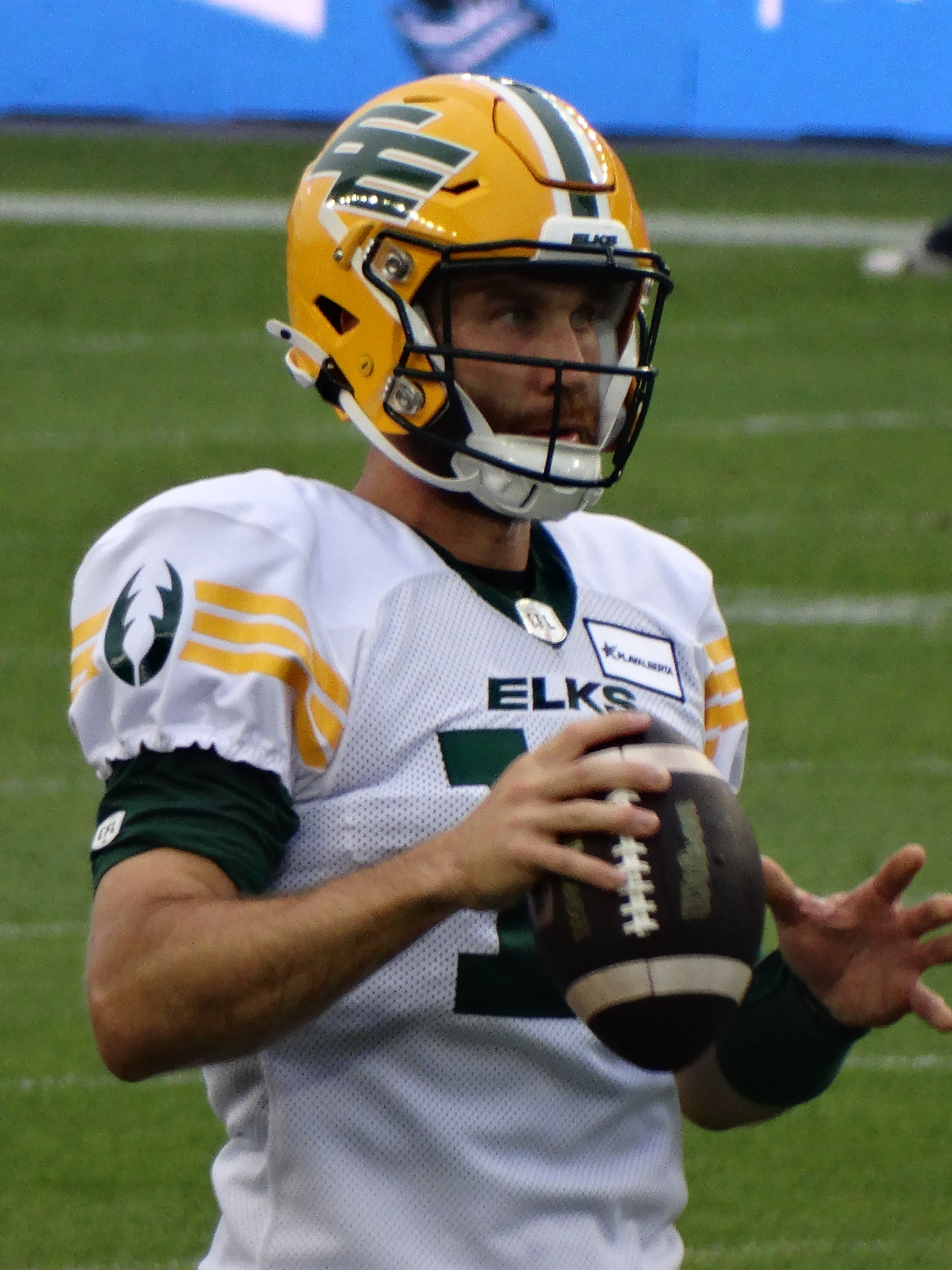
- Bethel-Thompson with the Edmonton Elks in 2024

No. 3 – Ottawa Redblacks
- Position: Quarterback
- Roster status: Active
- CFL status: American

Personal information
- Born: July 3, 1988 (age 38); San Francisco, California, U.S.
- Listed height: 6 ft 4 in (1.93 m)
- Listed weight: 236 lb (107 kg)

Career information
- High school: Balboa (San Francisco)
- College: UCLA (2006–2007); Sacramento State (2008–2010)
- NFL draft: 2011: undrafted

Career history
- San Jose SaberCats (2011); San Francisco 49ers (2011)*; Sacramento Mountain Lions (2011); Miami Dolphins (2011)*; Minnesota Vikings (2012–2013); San Francisco 49ers (2013); New England Patriots (2014)*; Minnesota Vikings (2014)*; Miami Dolphins (2014–2015)*; San Francisco 49ers (2015)*; Philadelphia Eagles (2016)*; Winnipeg Blue Bombers (2016)*; Toronto Argonauts (2017–2019, 2021–2022); New Orleans Breakers (2023); Edmonton Elks (2024); Montreal Alouettes (2025); Ottawa Redblacks (2026–present)
- * Offseason or practice squad member only

Awards and highlights
- 2× Grey Cup champion (2017, 2022); CFL passing leader (2022); CFL passing touchdowns leader (2019); 2× CFL East All-Star (2021, 2022); USFL passing yards leader (2023)

Career USFL statistics
- Passing attempts: 336
- Passing completions: 220
- Completion percentage: 65.5
- TD–INT: 14–8
- Passing yards: 2,433
- QBR: 90.8
- Stats at Pro Football Reference

Career CFL statistics as of 2025
- Passing completions: 1,598
- Passing attempts: 2,394
- Passing yards: 18,755
- TD–INT: 103–69
- Passer rating: 92.7
- Stats at CFL.ca

McLeod John Baltazar Bethel-Thompson (born July 3, 1988) is an American professional football quarterback for the Ottawa Redblacks of the Canadian Football League (CFL). He was a member of the Toronto Argonauts, winning two Grey Cup championships with the team: one as a back-up quarterback in 2017, another as the team's starter in 2022. He played college football at UCLA and Sacramento State. He is the grandson of the 1948 Olympic shot put champion Wilbur 'Moose' Thompson. Bethel-Thompson is a journeyman quarterback having been a member of five different NFL teams, five CFL teams, and one team in the Arena Football League (AFL), United Football League (UFL), and United States Football League (USFL).

== Early life ==
Bethel-Thompson graduated from San Francisco's Balboa High School in 2006, where he played football, basketball, and baseball. He was the city's Football Player of the Year in 2006 and its Back of the Year in 2005. In 2004 and 2005, he led his team to the Turkey Bowl, the city's annual championship, held on Thanksgiving Day in Kezar Stadium.

== College career ==
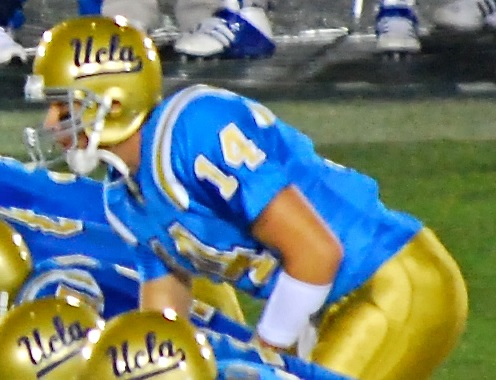
Bethel-Thompson with the UCLA Bruins in 2007

=== UCLA ===
After a redshirt year at UCLA in 2006, Bethel-Thompson shared the Bruins' quarterback duties in the 2007 season. He relieved Osaar Rasshan in the 2007 Las Vegas Bowl where the Bruins lost to BYU. Bethel-Thompson saw action in five games for UCLA in 2007, completing 23 of 55 passes for 293 yards, with one touchdown and five interceptions.

=== Sacramento State ===
Bethel-Thompson played at Sacramento State from 2008 to 2010. In 2008, Bethel-Thompson made his first Hornets start against Southern Oregon where he was 19–32 for 255 yards and a touchdown. He started the following week against Weber State where he would suffer a season ending knee injury. In 2009, he served as the team's holder for all 11 games. He led the Hornets to a come-from-behind victory over UC Davis in the season finale, throwing a game-winning touchdown pass in the twenty seconds.

As a redshirt senior, Bethel-Thompson was named the starting quarterback in the season opener against Stanford. Late in the first half, Bethel-Thompson injured his knee. The injury he sustained caused him to missing the following six games. On the season, he appeared in five games. In three seasons at Sacramento State, Bethel-Thompson appeared in 20 games, completing 113 of 197 passes for 1,322 yards, with seven touchdowns and eight interceptions.

== Professional career ==
=== San Jose SaberCats ===
After going undrafted in the 2011 NFL draft, Bethel-Thompson joined the San Jose SaberCats of the Arena Football League. Bethel-Thompson appeared in 12 total games, mostly as a holder. He relieved starting quarterback Mark Grieb in three games, completing 20 out of 43 passes for 220 yards, 3 touchdowns, and 1 interception, as well as 2 rushes for 24 yards.

=== San Francisco 49ers (first stint) ===
Bethel-Thompson signed with the San Francisco 49ers on July 28, 2011. He was released on September 3, 2011, before the start of the regular season.

=== Sacramento Mountain Lions ===
On September 3, 2011, Bethel-Thompson signed with the Sacramento Mountain Lions. Bethel-Thompson competed with Jordan Palmer, former Fresno State quarterback Ryan Colburn, and Trevor Harris for the starting job. Palmer was released and Harris signed with the Orlando Predators. In his first professional start, Bethel-Thompson was named UFL offensive Player of the Week against the Virginia Destroyers. With the final two regular season games cancelled, Bethel-Thompson and the Lions defeated the Omaha Nighthawks in a postseason consolation game.

=== Miami Dolphins (first stint) ===
Later in 2011, Bethel-Thompson signed to the Miami Dolphins practice squad.

=== Minnesota Vikings (first stint) ===
Bethel-Thompson signed a future contract with the Minnesota Vikings on January 13, 2012. He was named to the 53-man active roster just before the start of the 2012 regular season after beating out veteran Sage Rosenfels for the third-string quarterback job. He was waivers on October 8, 2013, when the Vikings signed Josh Freeman.

=== San Francisco 49ers (second stint) ===
Bethel-Thompson was claimed off waivers by the San Francisco 49ers on October 9, 2013. He was waived on November 26, 2013, then signed to the practice squad a day later. He was signed to a reserve/future deal on January 23, 2014. The 49ers waived Bethel-Thompson on August 25, 2014.

=== New England Patriots ===
Bethel-Thompson was signed to the New England Patriots practice squad on August 31, 2014. He was released by the Patriots on September 9, 2014.

=== Minnesota Vikings (second stint) ===
Bethel-Thompson was signed to the Vikings' practice squad on September 22, 2014. The signing came in part due to the injury to Matt Cassel, leaving the Vikings with only two healthy quarterbacks on the roster, in Teddy Bridgewater and Christian Ponder. After Bridgewater's week 4 injury, Chandler Harnish was signed to the practice squad and eventually the active roster to back up Ponder in Week 5 against the Green Bay Packers, leaving Bethel-Thompson on the practice squad. He was released from the team on October 7, 2014.

=== Miami Dolphins (second stint) ===
On October 15, 2014, Bethel-Thompson was signed to the Miami Dolphins' practice squad. He was released on September 5, 2015, as part of the Dolphins' final roster cuts. On September 6, 2015, Bethel-Thompson was signed to the Miami Dolphins' practice squad. On September 9, 2015, he was released by the Dolphins.

=== San Francisco 49ers (third stint) ===
On November 23, 2015, Bethel-Thompson was signed to the 49ers' practice squad.

=== Philadelphia Eagles ===
On February 18, 2016, Bethel-Thompson was signed by the Philadelphia Eagles. He was released on May 17 but re-signed on July 24. On September 3, 2016, he was released by the Eagles.

=== Winnipeg Blue Bombers ===
Bethel-Thompson was signed to the Winnipeg Blue Bombers' practice roster on September 20, 2016. He was released by the team on October 19, 2016.

=== Toronto Argonauts ===
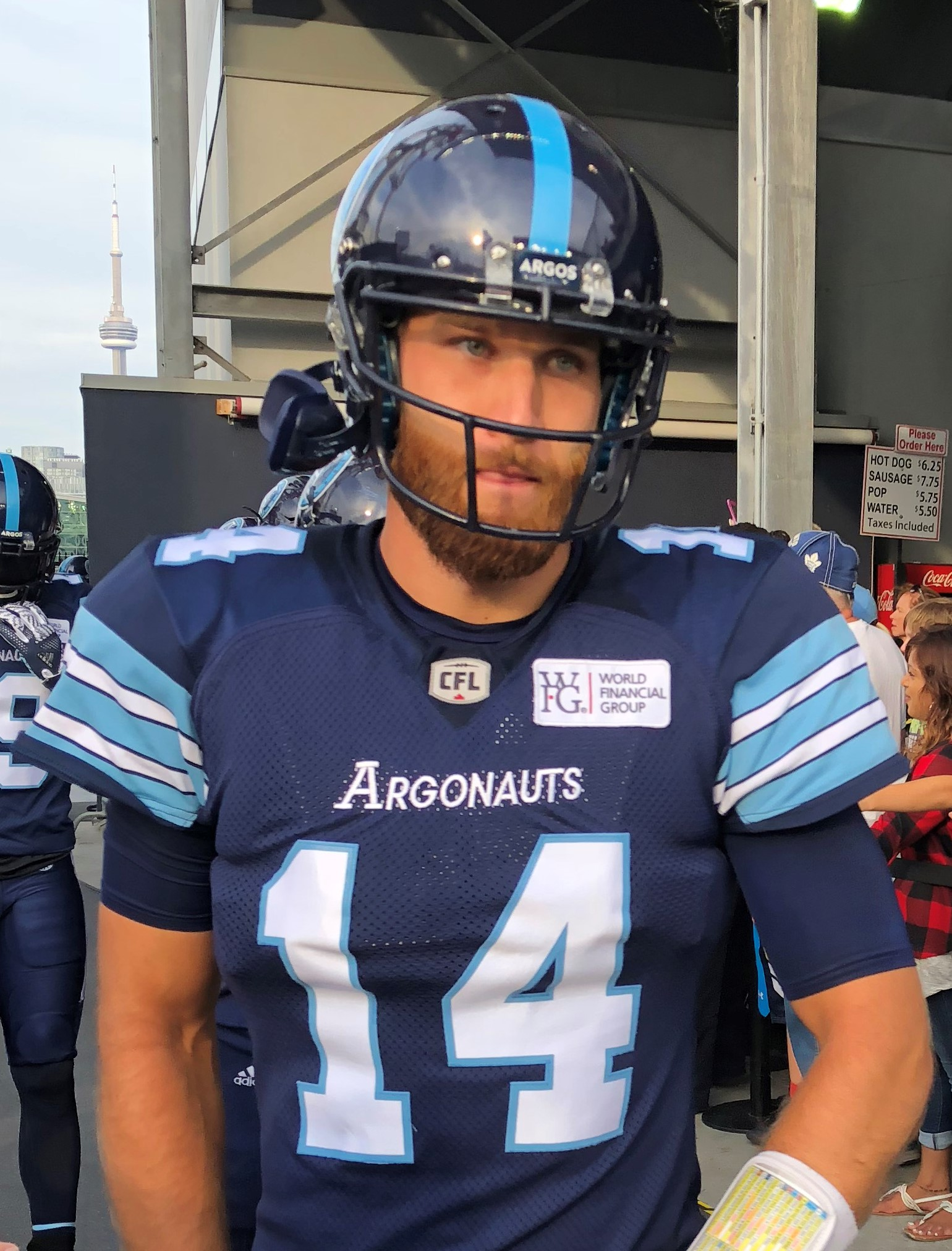
Bethel-Thompson before his first career CFL start on August 2, 2018.

In April 2017, Bethel-Thompson played with a startup developmental minor league, The Spring League. Bethel-Thompson started for the West Team in the league's inaugural game against the East Team, led by fellow quarterback Ricky Stanzi. During the second quarter, he threw a six-yard touchdown pass to tight end Jordan Thompson, the first touchdown in league history, and led the West Team to a 10–6 victory. Players were scouted by numerous NFL and CFL teams during the practices and two games played, and Bethel-Thompson earned an invite to workout at a minicamp for the New York Jets. He was not offered a contract following the Jets minicamp, and on May 23, 2017, Bethel-Thompson signed with the Toronto Argonauts of the Canadian Football League. During the 2 game preseason, Bethel-Thompson started at quarterback in one game, and completed 5 passes out of 13 attempts, throwing for 78 yards, and rushing for 1 yard for a first down on a quarterback sneak. Following the release of CFL veteran Drew Willy, Bethel-Thompson made the Argonauts' roster as the 4th quarterback. It was an irregular decision given that the Argonauts elected to keep an additional quarterback on their practice roster, giving them a total of 5 quarterbacks, whereas most CFL teams keep only the required 3 quarterbacks as part of their active roster. On June 24, Bethel-Thompson was placed on the 6-game injured list, and received several extensions. Coming off the injured list after 13 weeks, Bethel-Thompson made his debut on September 23, backing up Argos starter, and fellow Sacramento State alumni Ricky Ray. Bethel-Thompson entered the game during garbage time, and completed his only pass attempt for 8 yards in the 33–19 victory over the Montreal Alouettes. After going 2-for-2 for 10 yards during the regular season, Bethel-Thompson was the 2nd string QB as the Argonauts won the 105th Grey Cup over the Calgary Stampeders.

Bethel-Thompson was named the Argos' starting quarterback in Week 8 of the 2018 season after Ricky Ray was out for the season with a neck injury and backup quarterback James Franklin was ineffective in his first four starts. In his first CFL start, Bethel-Thompson and the Argos overcame a 24-point deficit to defeat the Ottawa Redblacks 42–41. Bethel-Thompson completed a 23-yard pass to Armanti Edwards for the game winning score with one second left in the game. After beating the Lions the following week, Bethel-Thompson went on to start and lose the next six games, resulting in the Argos elimination from playoff contention. James Franklin was announced as the team's Week 18 starter.

Bethel-Thompson began the 2019 season as the Argos' backup quarterback behind James Franklin. However, Bethel-Thompson was announced the starting quarterback after Franklin was placed on the six-game injured reserve list following the team's Week 3 loss. Bethel-Thompson remained the Argos starting quarterback until Week 16, and the team fell to a record of 2–10. The team then announced James Franklin as the starting quarterback. Nevertheless, Bethel-Thompson was promoted to starting quarterback again for the team's Week 18 match against the Redblacks after the team lost both matches with Franklin at the helm. All four wins by the 2019 Argos came with Bethel-Thompson starting at quarterback, and by the end of the season, Bethel-Thompson's career year had produced a CFL-best 26 touchdown passes.

During his first three years in the CFL, Bethel-Thompson had also been working toward his master's degree in education from UC Berkeley. The day before he defended his thesis, Bethel-Thompson signed an extension with Toronto.

After the CFL cancelled the 2020 season due to the COVID-19 pandemic, Bethel-Thompson chose to opt-out of his contract with the Argonauts on August 25, 2020.

Bethel-Thompson was selected by the Aviators of The Spring League during its player selection draft on October 12, 2020. In three games, he threw for nearly 700 yards and five touchdowns before a COVID outbreak caused the remaining games to be cancelled and the final rescheduled. While the Aviators under Bethel-Thompson earned a championship appearance, he declined to attend the game to prepare for “opportunities in more sustainable leagues with more resources available to the players.” Brian Woods, CEO of The Spring League, stated that Bethel-Thompson did not play due to injury, which was vehemently denied by Bethel-Thompson, who felt the attack on his character by Woods was "disconcerting".

Despite signing Nick Arbuckle to a free agent deal, the Argos brought back Bethel-Thompson as quarterback depth right before training camp. Due to Arbuckle dealing with a hamstring injury, Bethel-Thompson began the season as the Argos quarterback. Bethel-Thompson started the first two games of the season, before being replaced by Arbuckle who started the next four games in the middle of the season. Bethel-Thompson was reinstated as the team's starting quarterback in Week 8 and confirmed again in Week 10 after the team's second bye week. On October 26, 2021, Arbuckle was traded to the Edmonton Elks, signaling the Argos' confidence in Bethel-Thompson for the remainder of the season. Bethel-Thompson and the Argos earned a first round bye but were defeated in the Eastern Division Final by the Hamilton Tiger-Cats. Following the game, Bethel-Thompson made inappropriate on-field contact with a cameraperson, for which he later apologized. He was subsequently fined by the league for his actions. On January 30, 2022, Bethel-Thompson and the Argos agreed to a one-year contract extension.

In 2022, Bethel-Thompson began the 2022 season as the Argos' starting quarterback, with Chad Kelly serving as backup. Bethel-Thompson started 17 regular season games during the season, sitting out the final game as the club had already secured the first seed in the East Division with a record of 11–7. Bethel-Thompson led the league in pass completions, attempts, and passing yards. In the playoffs, he led the Argos past the Montreal Alouettes 34–27, advancing to the Grey Cup final on November 20, 2022. Bethel-Thompson sustained a hand injury in the 4th quarter and was replaced by back-up Chad Kelly. The Argos earned a one-point victory over the Winnipeg Blue Bombers, Bethel-Thompson's second overall Grey Cup and first as a starting quarterback.

Following the conclusion of the season there was mounting speculation that Bethel-Thompson would consider retirement from professional football. In late November 2022, he underwent surgery on the thumb of his throwing hand after suffering an injury in the 109th Grey Cup. In early February he revealed that he was intending to play football in 2023, and if he were to return to the CFL he would only consider playing for the Argos. On February 14, 2023, Bethel-Thompson became a free agent.

=== New Orleans Breakers ===
On February 22, 2023, Bethel-Thompson signed with the New Orleans Breakers of the United States Football League (USFL). Bethel-Thompson started all 10 regular seasons games for the Breakers, and was the leading passer in the USFL with 2,433 yards. With a record of 7 wins and 3 losses, the Breakers earned a playoff berth, but for the second consecutive season were eliminated by the eventual Champions, the Birmingham Stallions. He was released after the season on July 11, 2023.

=== Edmonton Elks ===
On January 7, 2024, it was announced that Bethel-Thompson had signed with the Edmonton Elks. Bethel-Thompson started the team's first seven games of the season, all losses, before getting benched for Tre Ford; though he would share starting duties with Ford for the rest of the season, Bethel-Thompson started most of the team's games, going 3–10 as a starter while passing for 3,748 yards, 24 touchdowns, and 11 interceptions.

=== Montreal Alouettes ===
On December 17, 2024, it was announced that Bethel-Thompson's rights had been traded to the Montreal Alouettes in exchange for Cody Fajardo.

Bethel-Thompson became a free agent upon the expiry of his contract on February 10, 2026.

=== Ottawa Redblacks ===
On June 23, 2026, Bethel-Thompson signed with the Ottawa Redblacks after the team traded away former starter, Dru Brown, on the same day.

== Career statistics ==
Legend
	Won the Grey Cup
	Led the league
**Bold**	Career high

=== CFL ===
==== Regular season ====
Year	Team	Games			Passing									Rushing					Sacks	
Year	Team	GD	GS	Record	Cmp	Att	Pct	Yds	Y/A	Lng	TD	Int	Rtg	Att	Yds	Avg	Lng	TD	Sck	SckY
2017	TOR	6	0	—	2	2	**100.0**	10	5.0	8	0	0	87.5	0	0	0.0	0	0	0	0
2018	TOR	**18**	8	2–6	198	303	65.3	2,193	7.2	64	9	10	82.8	22	116	5.3	**23**	**1**	12	57
2019	TOR	**18**	13	4–9	335	493	68.0	4,024	**8.2**	96	**26**	13	99.3	26	160	6.2	20	**1**	38	270
2021	TOR	14	9	7–2	203	306	66.3	2,303	7.5	81	12	11	86.8	10	71	7.1	19	0	15	93
2022	TOR	**18**	**17**	**11–6**	**387**	**579**	66.8	**4,731**	**8.2**	70	23	**15**	94.3	**35**	**166**	4.7	17	0	**41**	**281**
2024	EDM	16	13	3–10	318	468	67.9	3,748	8.0	**106**	24	11	**99.4**	11	83	**7.6**	16	0	19	131
2025	MTL	15	8	3–5	155	243	63.8	1,746	7.2	77	9	9	82.1	11	62	5.6	12	0	14	77
2026	OTT	15	4	0–4	124	200	62.0	1,553	7.8	60	9	4	92.8	6	19	3.2	5	0	9	59
Career		120	72	30–42	1,722	2,594	66.4	20,308	7.8	106	112	73	92.7	121	677	5.6	23	2	148	968

==== Postseason ====
Year	Team	Games			Passing								Rushing			
Year	Team	GD	GS	Record	Cmp	Att	Pct	Yds	Y/A	TD	Int	Rtg	Att	Yds	Avg	TD
2017	TOR	0	0	—	DNP											
2021	TOR	1	1	0–1	24	38	63.2	283	7.4	0	0	85.7	1	2	2.0	0
2022	TOR	2	2	2–0	34	55	61.8	502	9.1	2	0	103.7	0	0	0.0	0
2025	MTL	3	0	—	DNP											
Career		5	3	2–1	58	93	62.3	785	8.4	2	0	96.3	1	2	2.0	0

=== USFL ===
Regular season

Year	Team	Games			Passing								Rushing			
Year	Team	GP	GS	Record	Cmp	Att	Pct	Yds	Y/A	TD	Int	Rtg	Att	Yds	Avg	TD
2023	NO	10	10	7–3	220	336	65.5	2,433	7.2	14	8	90.8	17	46	2.7	0

Postseason

Year	Team	Games			Passing								Rushing			
Year	Team	GP	GS	Record	Cmp	Att	Pct	Yds	Y/A	TD	Int	Rtg	Att	Yds	Avg	TD
2023	NO	1	1	0–1	26	50	52.0	273	5.5	2	2	64.8	0	0	0.0	0

=== UFL ===
Regular season

Year	Team	Games			Passing								Rushing			
Year	Team	GP	GS	Record	Cmp	Att	Pct	Yds	Y/A	TD	Int	Rtg	Att	Yds	Avg	TD
2011	SAC	2	1	1–0	38	72	52.8	420	5.8	3	3	66.9	5	21	4.2	0

Postseason (Consolation Game)

Year	Team	Games			Passing								Rushing			
Year	Team	GP	GS	Record	Cmp	Att	Pct	Yds	Y/A	TD	Int	Rtg	Att	Yds	Avg	TD
2011	SAC	1	1	1–0	32	58	55.1	355	6.1	0	1	66.3	?	?	?	?

=== AFL ===
Year	Team	Games			Passing								Rushing			
Year	Team	GP	GS	Record	Cmp	Att	Pct	Yds	Y/A	TD	Int	Rtg	Att	Yds	Avg	TD
2011	SJ	12	0	0–0	20	43	46.5	220	5.1	3	1	75.7	2	24	12.0	0

=== College ===
Season	Team	Games			Passing								Rushing			
Season	Team	GP	GS	Record	Cmp	Att	Pct	Yds	Y/A	TD	Int	Rtg	Att	Yds	Avg	TD
2006	UCLA	Redshirt														
2007	UCLA	5	0	—	23	55	41.8	293	5.3	1	5	74.4	15	−32	−2.1	0
2008	SAC ST	4	2	1–1	28	49	57.1	415	8.5	2	1	137.7	16	33	2.1	1
2009	SAC ST	11	2	1–1	64	110	58.2	746	6.8	4	5	118.1	25	1	0.0	1
2010	SAC ST	5	1	0–1	21	38	55.3	161	4.2	1	2	89.0	6	−5	−0.8	0
Career		25	5	2–3	136	252	54.0	1,615	6.4	8	13	108.0	62	−3	0.0	2

== Personal life ==
Bethel-Thompson is the grandson of the 1948 Olympic shot-put champion Wilbur 'Moose' Thompson. He is also of Scottish and Salvadoran descent through his grandmother. Bethel-Thompson is in a longterm partnership with Chinaka Hodge, a poet, musician, and writer for theatre, film, and television. She is the creator of the Disney+ series Ironheart (miniseries).
