= Joe West (gridiron football) =

American gridiron football player (born 1984)

No. 16, 15, 19, 18, 85
- Position: Wide receiver

Personal information
- Born: February 1, 1984 (age 42); Melbourne, Florida, U.S.
- Listed height: 6 ft 1 in (1.85 m)
- Listed weight: 215 lb (98 kg)

Career information
- High school: Lakeview Centennial (Garland, Texas)
- College: UTEP
- NFL draft: 2008: undrafted

Career history
- Dallas Cowboys (2008)*; New Orleans Saints (2008)*; California Redwoods / Sacramento Mountain Lions (2009–2011); St. Louis Rams (2010–2011)*; Calgary Stampeders (2012–2016)
- * Offseason or practice squad member only

Awards and highlights
- Grey Cup champion (2014)
- Stats at Pro Football Reference
- Stats at CFL.ca (archive)

Joe Davis West Jr. (born February 1, 1984) is an American former professional football wide receiver. He was signed by the Dallas Cowboys as an undrafted free agent in 2008. He played college football at Texas-El Paso.

West was also a member of the New Orleans Saints, Sacramento Mountain Lions, St. Louis Rams, and Calgary Stampeders.

== Professional career ==
Pre-draft measurables
| Height | Weight | 40-yard dash | 10-yard split | 20-yard split | 20-yard shuttle | Three-cone drill | Vertical jump | Broad jump | Bench press | Wonderlic |
|---|---|---|---|---|---|---|---|---|---|---|
| 6 ft 1 1/8 in (1.86 m) | 213 lb (97 kg) | 4.52 s | 1.50 s | 2.62 s | 4.33 s | 6.96 s | 32 in (0.81 m) | 9 ft 5 in (2.87 m) | x reps | x |
Values from NFL Combine

=== Dallas Cowboys ===
After going undrafted in the 2008 NFL draft, West was signed by the Dallas Cowboys as an undrafted free agent. He was waived on June 19.

=== New Orleans Saints ===
West was signed by the New Orleans Saints, only to be waived during final cuts on August 30, 2008. He was subsequently re-signed to the team's practice squad.

=== California Redwoods ===
West was drafted by the California Redwoods of the United Football League in the UFL Premiere Season Draft in 2009. He signed with the team on August 18.

=== Calgary Stampeders ===
On May 7, 2012, West headed north to sign as a free agent with the Calgary Stampeders of the Canadian Football League.

Joe West caught his first CFL touchdown in the Stampeders' 17–10 win over the Saskatchewan Roughriders on August 25, 2012. Calgary head coach John Hufnagel commented on West after the game: "He executed his assignments well. That's exactly what we got him for." West would finish his first season in the CFL with 24 catches for 353 yards and 2 touchdowns.

West would start in 6 regular season games in the 2013 season totaling 277 yards on 19 pass receptions, with 3 touchdowns. He also added 3 receptions for 101 yards and a touchdown in the Western Final against Saskatchewan. Joe West missed 12 games of the season with a shoulder injury. On January 17, 2014, West signed a contract extension with the Calgary Stampeders.
