= Nate Lawrie =

American football player (born 1981)

No. 46, 85, 82, 80, 89
- Position: Tight end

Personal information
- Born: October 7, 1981 (age 45); Indianapolis, Indiana, U.S.
- Listed height: 6 ft 6 in (1.98 m)
- Listed weight: 255 lb (116 kg)

Career information
- High school: Roncalli (Indianapolis)
- College: Yale
- NFL draft: 2004: 6th round, 181st overall pick

Career history
- Tampa Bay Buccaneers (2004)*; Philadelphia Eagles (2004)*; Tampa Bay Buccaneers (2004–2005); New Orleans Saints (2005–2006); Cincinnati Bengals (2007); Baltimore Ravens (2008)*; Cincinnati Bengals (2008); California Redwoods (2009); Philadelphia Eagles (2010)*; Sacramento Mountain Lions (2010); San Francisco 49ers (2011)*; Sacramento Mountain Lions (2011)
- * Offseason or practice squad member only

Career NFL statistics
- Receptions: 4
- Receiving yards: 43
- Stats at Pro Football Reference

Nathan Earl Lawrie (born October 17, 1981) is an American former professional football player who was a tight end in the National Football League (NFL). He was selected by the Tampa Bay Buccaneers in the sixth round of the 2004 NFL draft. He played college football for the Yale Bulldogs.

Lawrie was also a member of the Philadelphia Eagles, New Orleans Saints, Cincinnati Bengals, Baltimore Ravens, and California Redwoods.

== Early life ==
Lawrie attended Roncalli High School in Indianapolis, Indiana and earned three varsity letters in football and track and field, and two varsity letters in basketball. In football, as a senior, Lawrie helped to lead his team to the Class 3A State Championship and an undefeated 15–0 record. In track and field, as a senior, he finished third in both the discus and shot put at the State Finals and was named his team's Most Valuable Field Athlete.

== College career ==
Lawrie played football collegiately at Yale University, from where he graduated in 2004 with a degree in political science. In his senior year he made 72 receptions, the most in a season by a Yale tight end.

== Professional career ==
=== Tampa Bay Buccaneers (first stint) ===
Lawrie was selected by the Tampa Bay Buccaneers in the sixth round (181st overall) in the 2004 NFL draft. He was waived on August 30, 2004.

=== Philadelphia Eagles (first stint) ===
Lawrie was signed to the Philadelphia Eagles' practice squad on September 6, 2004. He was released from the practice squad on September 23.

=== Tampa Bay Buccaneers (second stint) ===
Lawrie was re-signed to the Buccaneers' practice squad on September 29, 2004. He was promoted from the practice squad to the active roster on December 14. He was waived and re-signed to the practice squad on November 16, 2005. He was promoted to the active roster on November 25. He was waived on December 3.

=== New Orleans Saints ===
The New Orleans Saints claimed Lawrie off waivers near the end of the 2005 season on December 6, and he averaged 16 yards per catch, all of which were for first downs. He was waived on November 21, 2006.

=== Cincinnati Bengals (first stint) ===
Lawrie was signed by the Cincinnati Bengals to a one-year contract on August 2, 2007. He was waived on September 11 and was re-signed to the practice squad on September 13. He was promoted from the practice squad to the active roster on November 7. He played in three games during the 2007 season. He was released on August 30, 2008.

=== Baltimore Ravens ===
Lawrie was signed to the Baltimore Ravens' practice squad on September 1, 2008. He was waived from the practice squad on September 9.

=== Cincinnati Bengals (second stint) ===
Lawrie was re-signed to the Bengals' practice squad on September 11, 2008. He was promoted to the active roster on October 17. He was released on April 27, 2009.

=== California Redwoods ===
Lawrie played for the California Redwoods of the United Football League in 2009.

=== Philadelphia Eagles (second stint) ===
Lawrie was signed by the Philadelphia Eagles on August 9, 2010. He was waived on September 3.

=== San Francisco 49ers ===
On August 14, 2011, he signed a one-year contract with the San Francisco 49ers. He was released by the 49ers on September 3, 2011.
