= Erik Robertson =

American football player (born 1984)

No. 62, 60, 64
- Position: Center

Personal information
- Born: October 4, 1984 (age 42); Apple Valley, California, U.S.
- Listed height: 6 ft 2 in (1.88 m)
- Listed weight: 310 lb (141 kg)

Career information
- College: California
- NFL draft: 2007: undrafted

Career history
- San Diego Chargers (2007)*; San Diego Chargers (2008)*; Seattle Seahawks (2008)*; New York Sentinels (2009); Oklahoma City Yard Dawgz (2010); Sacramento Mountain Lions (2010–2011)
- * Offseason or practice squad member only

Career AFL statistics
- Total tackles: 1
- Stats at ArenaFan.com

Erik Robertson (born October 4, 1984) is an American former football center. He was signed by the San Diego Chargers as an undrafted free agent in 2007. He played college football at California.

Robertson was also a member of the Seattle Seahawks, New York Sentinels and Sacramento Mountain Lions.
