= Tyler Luellen =

American football player (born 1984)

No. 77
- Position: Offensive tackle

Personal information
- Born: July 25, 1984 (age 42); Bethany, Missouri, U.S.
- Listed height: 6 ft 6 in (1.98 m)
- Listed weight: 302 lb (137 kg)

Career information
- College: Missouri
- NFL draft: 2008: undrafted

Career history
- San Diego Chargers (2008)*; Sacramento Mountain Lions (2009–2011)
- * Offseason or practice squad member only

Tyler Luellen (born July 25, 1984) is an American former football offensive tackle for the Sacramento Mountain Lions of the United Football League (UFL). He was signed by the San Diego Chargers as an undrafted free agent in 2008. He played college football at Missouri.

== College career ==
During a game against Iowa State in 2004, Luellen hurt his left shoulder and was forced to undergo rotator-cuff surgery in the off-season. He sat out of spring drills in 2005, but was able to rejoin the team in time to play every game of the 2005 season. His 2006 spring was cut short by a knee injury that he again recovered from to play in each of the 2006 contests. In his final season as a Tiger, Luellen had the opportunity to participate fully in both spring and summer workouts.

== Professional career ==
=== San Diego Chargers ===
After going undrafted in the 2008 NFL draft, Luellen and was signed by the San Diego Chargers as an undrafted free agent on the April 28, 2008. He played in a single preseason game on August 9, 2008, but was released during roster cuts before the regular season. Luellen signed with the Canadian Football League's Hamilton Tiger-Cats the following October.

=== California Redwoods ===
Luellen was signed by the California Redwoods of the United Football League on August 18, 2009. He would go on to start at left tackle for the Redwoods (who later became the Sacramento Mountain Lions) from 2009-2011.
