= Dominique Jones (American football) =

American football player (born 1987)

No. 46, 86, 85
- Position: Tight end

Personal information
- Born: August 15, 1987 (age 39); San Diego, California, U.S.
- Listed height: 6 ft 3 in (1.91 m)
- Listed weight: 255 lb (116 kg)

Career information
- High school: Horizon Christian (San Diego)
- College: Shepherd (WV)
- NFL draft: 2011: undrafted

Career history
- Sacramento Mountain Lions (2011); Reading Express (2012); Indianapolis Colts (2012); Miami Dolphins (2012)*; Indianapolis Colts (2012–2013); Kansas City Chiefs (2013); Buffalo Bills (2014)*; Denver Broncos (2014); Baltimore Ravens (2015)*; New York Giants (2015)*; Minnesota Vikings (2015)*; Miami Dolphins (2016)
- * Offseason or practice squad member only

Career NFL statistics
- Receptions: 10
- Receiving yards: 103
- Receiving touchdowns: 1
- Stats at Pro Football Reference

Dominique Jones (born August 15, 1987) is an American former professional football player who was a tight end in the National Football League (NFL). He played college football for the Shepherd Rams.

== College career ==
He played college football at Shepherd University in 2010. As a tight end Jones totaled 403 yards on 34 receptions and averaged 11.9 yards a catch. He led the team in touchdown receptions with nine. The Rams had their furthest Division II playoff run in the school's history and won the WVIAC title before becoming the first WVIAC team to advance to the national semi-finals.

== Professional career ==
=== Sacramento Mountain Lions ===
He played the 2011 season for the Sacramento Mountain Lions of the United Football League.

=== Reading Express ===
He signed with the Reading Express of the Indoor Football League in 2012.

=== Indianapolis Colts ===
On April 30, 2012, he signed with the Indianapolis Colts as an undrafted free agent. On October 8, 2012, he was released and was re-signed to the practice squad the next day.

=== Miami Dolphins ===
On October 24, 2012, he was signed by the Miami Dolphins to join the practice squad. On November 19, 2012, he was released.

=== Second stint with the Indianapolis Colts ===
On November 21, 2012, he signed with the Indianapolis Colts.

Jones was released by the Colts on October 22, 2013.

=== Kansas City Chiefs ===
On October 30, 2013, he was signed by the Kansas City Chiefs to their practice squad. The Chiefs placed Jones on their active roster on December 7. He was released by the Chiefs on March 6, 2014.

=== Buffalo Bills ===
He signed with the Buffalo Bills on July 26. The Bills released Jones on August 29, 2014.

=== Denver Broncos ===
He was signed to the Denver Broncos practice squad on September 9, 2014, and cut on September 5, 2015.

=== Baltimore Ravens ===
Jones was signed to the Baltimore Ravens' practice squad on September 7, 2015. On September 24, 2015, he was released by the Ravens.

=== New York Giants ===
Jones was signed to the New York Giants' practice squad on October 7, 2015. On October 15, 2015, he was released by the Giants.

=== Minnesota Vikings ===
Jones was signed to the Minnesota Vikings' practice squad on November 17, 2015.

=== Return to Miami ===
The Dolphins signed Jones to a reserve/futures contract on January 19, 2016, along with Zac Dysert. On September 3, 2016, he was released by the Dolphins as part of final roster cuts. He was re-signed on October 3, 2016. In a Week 9 victory over the New York Jets, Jones was the Dolphins' leading receiver with 3 catches for 42 yards and 1 touchdown, the first of his career. On March 6, 2017, the Dolphins declined to sign Jones to an offer sheet, making him a free agent.
