= Jason Parker =

Jason Parker may refer to:

- Jason Parker (sport shooter) (born 1974), American sport shooter
- Jason Parker (American football) (born 1985), American football player
- Jason Parker (speed skater) (born 1975), Canadian speed skater
- Jason Parker, a fictional character in The Suite Life of Zack & Cody
