= Oakmont Regional High School =

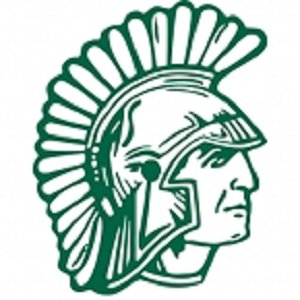

Location
- 9 Oakmont Drive; Ashburnham, Massachusetts 01430; United States; 42°36′14.48″N 71°55′20.42″W

Information
- Type: Public; Open enrollment
- Established: 1960
- School district: Ashburnham-Westminster
- Principal: Jeff Lizotte
- Teaching staff: 46.41 (FTE)
- Enrollment: 633 (2024–2025)
- Student to teacher ratio: 13.64
- Colors: Green & white
- Athletics conference: Midland Wachusett League
- Mascot: Spartan
- Rival: Fitchburg; Lunenburg
- Communities served: Ashburnham, Westminster
- Website: oak.awrsd.org

Oakmont Regional High School is a public high school in New England, located in Ashburnham, Massachusetts, United States. Its serves the towns of Ashburnham and Westminster which together comprise the regional School District. The property straddles the border between the two towns, with the athletic fields and a portion of the school building being located on the Westminster side. The superintendent is Todd Stewart.

== History ==
A regional school planning board was established by Westminster in 1954 and Ashburnham in 1955. The concept of building Oakmont Regional Junior-Senior High School was proposed by the school faculty in 1957. After it received town approval, construction was started in January 1959. The new school opened in September 1960 at a cost of $750,000. After a visit by the New England Association of Schools and Colleges in 1994 it was determined that after 34 years major renovations were needed. In the summer of 2001 construction began and was completed 26 months later at a cost of $35,561,481.

== Notable alumni ==
- John Griffin, NFL football player
