= Galen Stone (American football) =

American football player (born 1988)

No. 4, 44, 84
- Position: Tight end

Personal information
- Born: September 1, 1988 (age 38); Swartz Creek, Michigan
- Listed height: 6 ft 3 in (1.91 m)
- Listed weight: 263 lb (119 kg)

Career information
- High school: Swartz Creek (MI)
- College: Saginaw Valley State
- NFL draft: 2010: undrafted

Career history
- West Michigan ThunderHawks (2010); Florida Tuskers (2010); Sacramento Mountain Lions (2011)

Galen Stone (born September 1, 1988) is an American former football tight end. He played college football at Saginaw Valley State and professional for the Florida Tuskers and Sacramento Mountain Lions.

Stone was just one of two rookies on the Tuskers that had never played professional football before.
