= Jonathan Palmer (American football) =

American football player (born 1983)

No. 79, 77
- Positions: Guard, tackle

Personal information
- Born: December 3, 1983 (age 42); Decatur, Georgia, U.S.
- Listed height: 6 ft 4 in (1.93 m)
- Listed weight: 336 lb (152 kg)

Career information
- College: Auburn
- NFL draft: 2007: undrafted

Career history
- Philadelphia Eagles (2007)*; Pittsburgh Steelers (2007)*; Oakland Raiders (2007); New York Giants (2008)*; Cleveland Browns (2008)*; Carolina Panthers (2008–2009)*; Pittsburgh Steelers (2009)*; Arizona Cardinals (2009–2010)*; Jacksonville Jaguars (2010)*; Virginia Destroyers (2011–2012); Tennessee Titans (2012)*
- * Offseason or practice squad member only

Awards and highlights
- UFL champion (2011)

Jonathan Palmer (born December 3, 1983) is an American former football offensive lineman. He was signed by the Philadelphia Eagles as an undrafted free agent in 2007. He played college football at Auburn.

Palmer was also a member of the Carolina Panthers, Oakland Raiders, New York Giants, Cleveland Browns, Pittsburgh Steelers, Arizona Cardinals, Jacksonville Jaguars, Virginia Destroyers and Tennessee Titans.
