= Manny Collins =

American football player (born 1984)

No. 35, 30
- Position: Cornerback

Personal information
- Born: August 2, 1984 (age 42); Plainfield, New Jersey, U.S.
- Listed height: 5 ft 10 in (1.78 m)
- Listed weight: 190 lb (86 kg)

Career information
- College: Rutgers
- NFL draft: 2007: undrafted

Career history
- New York Jets (2007–2008)*; Hartford Colonials (2010); Sacramento Mountain Lions (2011)
- * Offseason or practice squad member only

Manny Collins (born August 2, 1984) is an American former football cornerback. He was signed by the New York Jets as an undrafted free agent in 2007. He played college football at Rutgers.

== Early life ==
Collins played high school football at Plainfield High School.
