= Kenneth Moore (American football) =

American football player (born 1985)

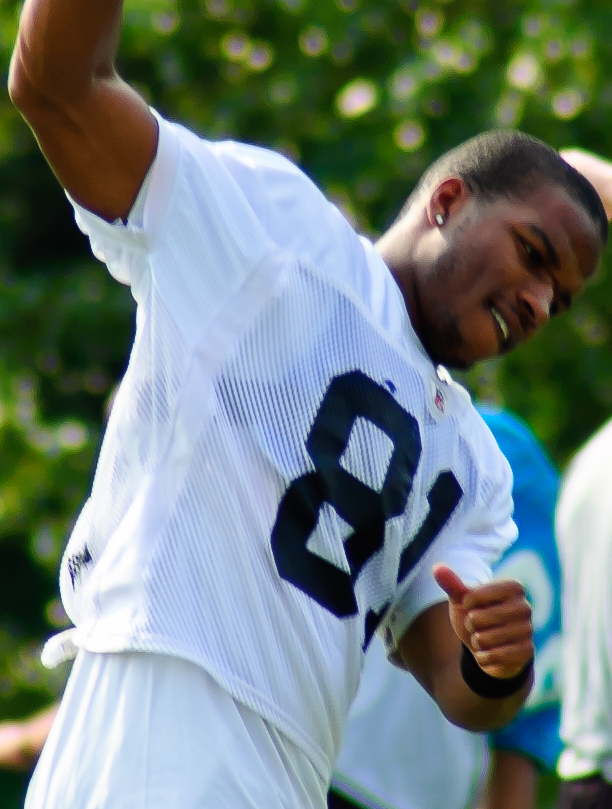
- Moore with the Carolina Panthers in 2010

No. 18, 80, 81
- Position: Wide receiver

Personal information
- Born: February 19, 1985 (age 41); Charlotte, North Carolina, U.S.
- Listed height: 5 ft 11 in (1.80 m)
- Listed weight: 195 lb (88 kg)

Career information
- High school: David W. Butler (Matthews, North Carolina)
- College: Wake Forest
- NFL draft: 2008: 5th round, 136th overall pick

Career history
- Detroit Lions (2008)*; Carolina Panthers (2008–2010); Indianapolis Colts (2010); Pittsburgh Steelers (2011)*; Sacramento Mountain Lions (2011)
- * Offseason or practice squad member only

Awards and highlights
- First-team All-ACC (2007)

Career NFL statistics
- Receptions: 6
- Receiving yards: 59
- Stats at Pro Football Reference

Kenneth Moore, Jr. (born February 19, 1985) is an American former professional football player who was a wide receiver in the National Football League (NFL). He was selected by the Detroit Lions in the fifth round of the 2008 NFL draft. He played college football for the Wake Forest Demon Deacons. Moore was also a member of the Carolina Panthers, Indianapolis Colts, Pittsburgh Steelers and Sacramento Mountain Lions.

== Early life ==
Moore played high school football at David W. Butler High School in Matthews, North Carolina.

== College career ==
Kenneth Moore earned All-Atlantic Coast Conference (ACC) honors as a senior in 2007, as he set league and school single-season records with 98 receptions, good for 1,011 yards (10.3 avg) and five touchdowns. Serving as the full-time punt returner, he gained 355 yards with a score on 34 attempts (10.4 avg). He ranked third on the team with 44 carries for 316 yards (7.2 avg) and three touchdowns. He also had 10 kickoff returns for 172 yards (17.2 avg), made a pair of solo tackles and ranked second in the ACC with an average of 142.62 all-purpose yards per game.

== Professional career ==
Pre-draft measurables
Height	Weight	Arm length	Hand span	40-yard dash	10-yard split	20-yard split	20-yard shuttle	Three-cone drill	Vertical jump	Broad jump
5 ft 10 3/4 in (1.80 m)	195 lb (88 kg)	31 1/8 in (0.79 m)	9 in (0.23 m)	4.51 s	1.53 s	2.61 s	4.29 s	6.97 s	31.5 in (0.80 m)	10 ft 0 in (3.05 m)
All values from NFL Combine/Pro Day

=== Carolina Panthers ===
After his release from the Detroit Lions, Moore spent much of the 2008 season on the practice squad for the Carolina Panthers. His play in training camp and the exhibition season earned him a roster spot with the Panthers for the 2009 season. Moore was the first native Charlottean to play a regular season game for the Panthers. Moore was waived by the Panthers on September 4, 2010.

=== Indianapolis Colts ===
Moore was signed by the Indianapolis Colts on October 5, 2010 after kick returner Devin Moore was injured. He was waived by the Indianapolis Colts on October 19, after fumbling twice against the Washington Redskins on October 17.

=== Pittsburgh Steelers ===
On August 10, 2011, Moore signed with the Pittsburgh Steelers, after they waived/injured rookie receiver Adam Mims. Moore was waived on August 28.
