= Lee Vickers =

American football player (born 1981)

No. 86
- Position: Tight end

Personal information
- Born: March 13, 1981 (age 45); Athens, Alabama, U.S.
- Listed height: 6 ft 7 in (2.01 m)
- Listed weight: 275 lb (125 kg)

Career information
- College: North Alabama
- NFL draft: 2006: undrafted

Career history
- Pittsburgh Steelers (2006)*; Philadelphia Eagles (2006–2007)*; Baltimore Ravens (2007); Pittsburgh Steelers (2008)*; New York Giants (2009)*; Washington Redskins (2010)*; Omaha Nighthawks (2010–2011)
- * Offseason or practice squad member only

Career NFL statistics
- Receptions: 2
- Receiving yards: 4
- Stats at Pro Football Reference

Lee Vickers (born March 13, 1981) is an American former professional football player who was a tight end in the National Football League (NFL). He played college football for the North Alabama Lions and was signed by the Pittsburgh Steelers as an undrafted free agent in 2006.

Vickers was also a member of the Philadelphia Eagles, Baltimore Ravens, New York Giants and Washington Redskins of the NFL, and the Omaha Nighthawks of the United Football League (UFL).

== Early life ==
Vickers attended Athens High School in Alabama and was part of the team who went to the state playoffs three years in a row. It was there he was high school teammates with former Los Angeles Chargers quarterback Philip Rivers. After graduation, he accepted a scholarship to Calhoun Community College to play baseball. He then transferred to the University of North Alabama to play football.

== College career ==
Vickers played college football at the University of North Alabama, where during his four-year career posted 67 tackles and 13.5 sacks. He majored in professional biology.

== Professional career ==
=== First stint with Steelers ===
Vickers was originally signed by the Pittsburgh Steelers as a rookie free agent on May 9, 2006. However, he was later waived by the team.

=== Philadelphia Eagles ===
Vickers was picked up by the Philadelphia Eagles on September 19, 2006. He spent a brief period on the active roster but never got any playing time and was waived.

=== Baltimore Ravens ===
Vickers was signed by the Baltimore Ravens as a free agent on September 26, 2007. He played in nine games making two receptions for four yards. He was released from the Ravens on August 12, 2008.

=== Second stint with Steelers ===
On August 16, 2008, Vickers re-signed with the Steelers and was released on August 30, 2008.

=== New York Giants ===
Vickers was signed by the New York Giants on March 4, 2009. He was waived on September 1.

=== Washington Redskins ===
On January 5, 2010, Vickers was signed to a reserve/future contract by the Washington Redskins.

=== Omaha Nighthawks ===
Vickers was signed by the Omaha Nighthawks in 2010. He was re-signed by the team on July 15, 2011.
