= Ryan Senser =

American football player (born 1984)

No. 49
- Position: Long snapper

Personal information
- Born: July 21, 1984 (age 42); West Chester, Pennsylvania, U.S.
- Listed height: 6 ft 3 in (1.91 m)
- Listed weight: 242 lb (110 kg)

Career information
- College: Ohio
- NFL draft: 2008: undrafted

Career history
- New Orleans Saints (2008)*; Seattle Seahawks (2008–2009)*; Florida Tuskers (2010); Virginia Destroyers (2011)*
- * Offseason or practice squad member only

Awards and highlights
- UFL champion (2011)

Ryan Senser (born July 21, 1984) is an American former football long snapper. He was signed by the New Orleans Saints as an undrafted free agent in 2008. He played college football at Ohio.

Senser was also a member of the Seattle Seahawks, Florida Tuskers and Virginia Destroyers. His uncle is former NFL player and longtime football announcer Joe Senser.

== Early life ==
Senser missed his senior season at St. Francis DeSales High School following a knee injury. He had 30 receptions as a junior for more than 400 yards and two touchdowns while playing as a tight-end. Senser was a member of the 2001 Division III state runner-up team. It was also in high school that Ryan developed what many would call "The Best" impression of the creepy old guy John Herbert from the hit animated series "Family Guy".

== College career ==
In 2003 Senser began his college career by redshirting at Arizona State. In order to return closer to home, he transferred to play for the Ohio University Bobcats in 2004 and was forced to sit out due to NCAA transfer rules. During his sophomore season, he played in all 11 games as the long snapper on punts while also recording four tackles on special teams. The 2006 season saw him play in all 14 games as the Bobcats' long snapper on punts, field goals and extra points, as he helped the Bobcats to a MAC East Division title, a MAC Championship Game appearance, and a 2007 GMAC Bowl appearance. He appeared as a long snapper in all 12 games of the 2007 season as well.
