= Billy Latsko =

American football player (born 1984)

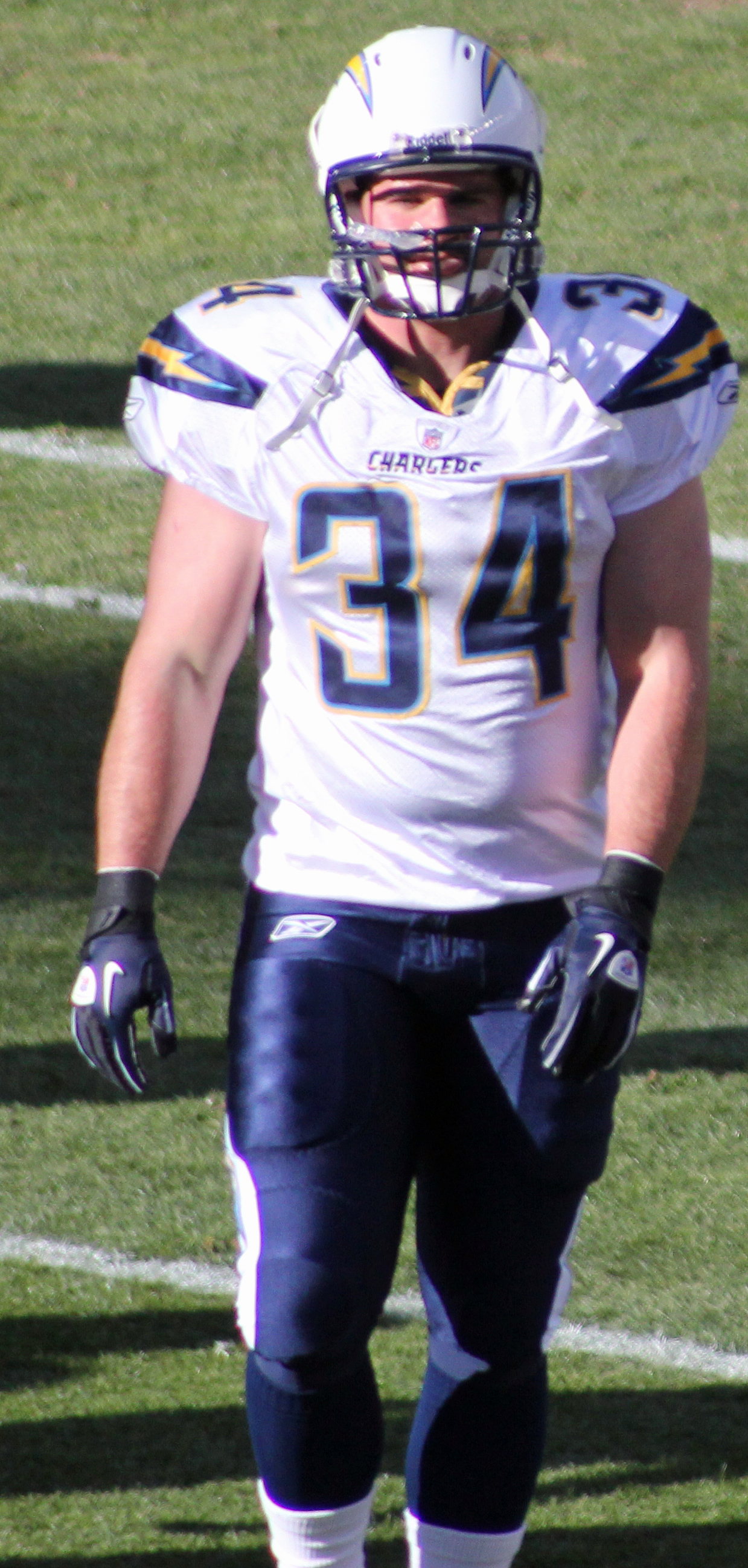
- Latsko with the San Diego Chargers in 2011

No. 34, 42
- Position: Fullback

Personal information
- Born: February 16, 1984 (age 42); Gainesville, Florida, U.S.
- Listed height: 5 ft 10 in (1.78 m)
- Listed weight: 233 lb (106 kg)

Career information
- College: Florida (2002–2006)
- NFL draft: 2007: undrafted

Career history
- Carolina Panthers (2007); Pittsburgh Steelers (2008)*; Carolina Panthers (2008)*; San Diego Chargers (2008–2010); Virginia Destroyers (2011)
- * Offseason or practice squad member only

Awards and highlights
- UFL champion (2011); BCS national champion (2006)

Career NFL statistics
- Games played: 1
- Tackles: 1
- Stats at Pro Football Reference

William Latsko (born February 16, 1984) is an American former professional football player who was a fullback in the National Football League (NFL). He played college football for the University of Florida, and was a member of a BCS National Championship team. Thereafter, he was signed by the NFL's Carolina Panthers as an undrafted free agent in 2007, and was also a member of the Pittsburgh Steelers and San Diego Chargers of the NFL, and the Virginia Destroyers of the United Football League (UFL).

== Early life ==
William Latsko was born on February 16, 1984 in Gainesville, Florida. He played high school football at Buchholz High School in Gainesville as a linebacker. He was a three-year starter and was named third-team all-state in 2000, second-team all-state in 2001, and first-team all-area in 2001. Latsko was also a leftfielder on the baseball team for four years. He was on the weightlifting team for four years as well and set the school record for the clean and jerk (325 lbs).

== College career ==
Latsko joined the Florida Gators of the University of Florida as a walk-on in 2002. He was redshirted his first year in 2002 and spent the year working with the scout team at middle linebacker. He played in all 13 games during the 2003 season as the team's main fullback, rushing three times for 14 yards and catching two passes for 31 yards in 102 total offensive snaps that season. He also led the team that year with 10 special teams tackles.

Latsko earned an athletic scholarship in February 2004. He was the team's primary fullback again in 2004 and appeared in all 12 games, starting three. He totaled 11 receptions for 76 yards and two touchdowns. He also led the team with 248 special team snaps and was named to the SEC Academic Honor Roll. Latsko spent time on offense, defense (linebacker), and special teams in 2005, playing in all 12 games while recording 5 catches for 43 yards and one touchdown, and eight total tackles on defense.

Latsko appeared in all 14 games during his senior year in 2006, catching four passes for 38 yards. The Gators defeated the Ohio State Buckeyes to win the BCS National Championship that season. He majored in building construction.

== Professional career ==
After going undrafted in the 2007 NFL draft, Latsko signed with the Carolina Panthers on May 4, 2007. He was waived on September 1, signed to the team's practice squad on September 3, released on October 2, and re-signed to the practice squad again on October 9. He was promoted to the active roster on November 6 but was waived again on November 10 and signed to the practice squad on November 13, 2007.

Latsko signed a reserve/future contract with the Pittsburgh Steelers on January 14, 2008, and was later waived on August 30, 2008.

He was signed to the Panthers' practice squad on September 1, 2008 and was released on September 30, 2008.

Latsko was signed to the practice squad of the San Diego Chargers on October 15, 2008. He was promoted to the active roster on November 29, but did not play in any games for the team during the 2008 season. He was waived on September 5, 2009, and signed to the practice squad two days later on September 7, where he spent the remainder of the 2009 season. Latsko signed a reserve/future contract with the Chargers on January 29, 2010. He was waived by the Chargers on September 4 but was later re-signed on December 30, 2010. He made his NFL debut, and only career appearance, on January 2, 2011 against the Denver Broncos and recorded one solo tackle. Latsko became a free agent after the 2010 season on July 26, 2011, the first day after the 2011 NFL lockout.

Latsko was signed by the Virginia Destroyers of the United Football League on May 19, 2011. He started all four games for the Destroyers during the 2011 season, catching four passes for 16 yards and one touchdown while also making one tackle. On October 21, 2011, the Destroyers defeated the Las Vegas Locomotives in the 2011 UFL championship game by a score of 17–3.

== Personal life ==
Latsko's grandfather, Bill Latsko, was a quarterback for the 1940 Florida Gators.

== See also ==
- List of Florida Gators in the NFL draft
