= Tony Taylor (American football) =

American gridiron football player (born 1984)

No. 53, 50
- Position: Linebacker

Personal information
- Born: July 21, 1984 (age 42); Watkinsville, Georgia, U.S.
- Listed height: 6 ft 0 in (1.83 m)
- Listed weight: 237 lb (108 kg)

Career information
- High school: Oconee County (GA)
- College: Georgia
- NFL draft: 2007: undrafted

Career history
- Atlanta Falcons (2007); Seattle Seahawks (2009)*; Florida Tuskers (2010); Virginia Destroyers (2011); Saskatchewan Roughriders (2012)*; Virginia Destroyers (2012)
- * Offseason or practice squad member only

Awards and highlights
- UFL champion (2011); Second-team All-SEC (2006); Freshman All-American (2002)

Career NFL statistics
- Total tackles: 12
- Stats at Pro Football Reference

Tony Taylor (born July 21, 1984) is an American former professional football player who was a linebacker in the National Football League (NFL). He was signed by the Atlanta Falcons as an undrafted free agent in 2007. He played college football for the Georgia Bulldogs.

Taylor was also a member of the Seattle Seahawks and the Virginia Destroyers of the United Football League (UFL).

== College career ==
Taylor had a very good senior season at the University of Georgia. He was named the MVP for the 2006 Georgia Bulldogs team after leading the team in tackles and also earned the Chick-fil-A Bowl Defensive MVP award after he helped his team to a bowl victory with 2 interceptions and 10 tackles. Taylor also played in the 2004 U.S. Army All American bowl with future college teammate Charles Johnson.

== Professional career ==
=== Atlanta Falcons ===
Taylor was signed as an undrafted free agent by the Atlanta Falcons after the 2007 NFL draft. He earned a spot on the active roster for the 2007 NFL season with the Falcons but did not make any starts and got most of his playing time on special teams. Taylor was released by the Falcons on September 1, 2008.

=== Seattle Seahawks ===
On May 21, 2009, Taylor was signed to a one-year contract as an unrestricted free agent by the Seattle Seahawks. He was waived/injured on August 5 and reverted to injured reserve. However, he was released with an injury settlement on August 11.

=== Saskatchewan Roughriders ===
On March 8, 2012, Taylor signed with the Saskatchewan Roughriders of the Canadian Football League. On May 18, 2012, he was released.
