= John Busing =

American football player (born 1983)

No. 36, 40
- Position: Safety

Personal information
- Born: September 1, 1983 (age 43); Alpharetta, Georgia, U.S.
- Listed height: 6 ft 2 in (1.88 m)
- Listed weight: 221 lb (100 kg)

Career information
- High school: Johns Creek (GA) Chattahoochee
- College: Miami (OH)
- NFL draft: 2006: undrafted

Career history
- Cincinnati Bengals (2006–2008); Houston Texans (2009); New York Giants (2010)*; Sacramento Mountain Lions (2011–2012)
- * Offseason or practice squad member only

Awards and highlights
- First-team All-MAC (2005)

Career NFL statistics
- Total tackles: 58
- Pass deflections: 3
- Interceptions: 1
- Stats at Pro Football Reference

John Busing (born September 1, 1983) is an American former professional football player who was a safety in the National Football League (NFL). He played college football for the Miami Redhawks and was signed by the Cincinnati Bengals as an undrafted free agent in 2006. Busing was also a member of the Houston Texans, New York Giants, and Sacramento Mountain Lions.

== College career ==
Busing came to Miami University as a wide receiver out of high school. He was moved to linebacker where he led the nation in interceptions by a linebacker during his junior year.

== Professional career ==
=== Cincinnati Bengals ===
Busing joined the Cincinnati Bengals as a free agent out of college and was moved to strong safety. After the 2008 season, he became a restricted free agent but was non-tendered and became an unrestricted free agent.

=== Houston Texans ===
Busing was signed by the Houston Texans on May 19, 2009. After the 2009 season, he became a restricted free agent but was non-tendered by the Texans and became an unrestricted free agent.

=== New York Giants ===
On July 31, 2010, Busing was signed by the New York Giants but was released just over a month later on September 4.

=== Sacramento Mountain Lions ===
Busing signed with the Sacramento Mountain Lions of the United Football League for the 2011 season. He started at safety and led the league in interceptions with 3 during the regular season.

== Personal life ==
Busing dated Andi Dorfman for four years. Dorfman reportedly broke up with Busing right before Season 18 of "The Bachelor" began featuring Juan Pablo Galavis.
