= Jamie Petrowski =

American football player (born 1982)

No. 85, 89
- Position: Tight end

Personal information
- Born: July 12, 1982 (age 44); Terre Haute, Indiana, U.S.
- Listed height: 6 ft 4 in (1.93 m)
- Listed weight: 262 lb (119 kg)

Career information
- College: Indiana State
- NFL draft: 2006: undrafted

Career history
- Tennessee Titans (2006–2008); Frankfurt Galaxy (2007); Indianapolis Colts (2008–2009); Carolina Panthers (2010)*; Las Vegas Locomotives (2011–2012)
- * Offseason or practice squad member only

Awards and highlights
- First-team All-Gateway (2005); Third-team AP All-American (2005)
- Stats at Pro Football Reference

James Stanley Petrowski (born July 12, 1982) is an American former professional football tight end. He was signed by the Tennessee Titans as an undrafted free agent in 2006. He played college football at Indiana State.

Petrowski was also a member of the Frankfurt Galaxy, Indianapolis Colts, Carolina Panthers and Las Vegas Locomotives.

== Professional career ==
=== Tennessee Titans ===
After going undrafted in the 2006 NFL draft, Petrowski signed as a free agent with the Tennessee Titans on May 3, 2006. He was waived during final cuts on September 2. The Titans signed him to their practice squad, where he remained for the final three games.

Following the 2006 season, Petrowski was re-signed by the Titans and allocated to the NFL Europe League where he played for the Frankfurt Galaxy. He appeared in 10 games (6 starts) for the Galaxy in 2007; he had 32 receptions for 474 yards and 5 touchdowns. The Galaxy finished with a record of 7–3 and lost the NFL Europe League title game.

Petrowski played in one playoff game for the Titans during the 2007 season.

=== Las Vegas Locomotives ===
Petrowski was signed by the Las Vegas Locomotives of the United Football League on May 11, 2011. He appeared in 7 games for the Locomotives over two seasons, he had 11 receptions for 111 yards and 1 touchdown. The Locomotives finished the 2011 season as the UFL Runner-Up and won the 2012 UFL title.
