= Jason Parker (American football) =

American football player (born 1985)

No. 90
- Position: Defensive end

Personal information
- Born: January 23, 1985 (age 41); San Diego, California, U.S.
- Listed height: 6 ft 3 in (1.91 m)
- Listed weight: 258 lb (117 kg)

Career information
- College: Arizona
- NFL draft: 2008: undrafted

Career history
- Kansas City Chiefs (2008)*; Las Vegas Locomotives (2009); California Redwoods (2009); Sacramento Mountain Lions (2010–2012)
- * Offseason or practice squad member only

Jason Anthony Parker (born January 23, 1985) is an American former football defensive end for the Sacramento Mountain Lions of the United Football League. He was signed by the Kansas City Chiefs as an undrafted free agent in 2008. He played college football at Arizona.

== Early life ==
Parker prepped at Mission Bay Senior High School in San Diego, California where he played defensive end and tight end.

== College career ==
Parker played college football at the University of Arizona.

== Professional career ==
=== Kansas City Chiefs ===
After going undrafted in the 2008 NFL draft, Parker signed with the Kansas City Chiefs as an undrafted free agent. He was waived during final cuts on August 30, only to be re-signed to the team's practice squad on September 2. He was released on October 1.

=== California Redwoods ===
Parker was signed by the California Redwoods of the United Football League on August 18, 2009.
