= John Griffin (running back) =

American football player (born 1988)

No. 21, 34
- Position: Running back

Personal information
- Born: December 17, 1988 (age 37); Austin, Texas, U.S.
- Listed height: 6 ft 0 in (1.83 m)
- Listed weight: 215 lb (98 kg)

Career information
- High school: Ashburnham (MA) Oakmont
- College: Massachusetts
- NFL draft: 2011: undrafted

Career history
- Cincinnati Bengals (2011)*; Omaha Nighthawks (2011); New York Jets (2012)*; Omaha Nighthawks (2012); New York Jets (2012–2013); Omaha Mammoths (2014)
- * Offseason or practice squad member only
- Stats at Pro Football Reference

John Anthony Griffin (born December 17, 1988) is an American former football running back. Who most recently played for the Omaha Mammoths of the Fall Experimental Football League. He signed with the Cincinnati Bengals as an undrafted free agent in 2011. He played college football at Northeastern until transferring to the University of Massachusetts for his senior season.

== Early life ==
He attended Oakmont Regional High School in Massachusetts where he just played one year on the varsity team. He broke the high school record for touchdowns in a single season with 25. He won a state title in the 100 meter dash and holds his highschool 100 meter and long jump record.

== College career ==
He played his first three seasons at Northeastern and was named to the 2009 CAA First-team before transferring to the University of Massachusetts. He was named to the 2010 CAA Third-team and was a FCS Senior Bowl Preseason All-American while at the university of Massachusetts.

== Professional career ==
=== Cincinnati Bengals ===
On July 27, 2011, he signed with the Cincinnati Bengals as an undrafted free agent. On September 3, 2011, he was released.

=== Omaha Nighthawks ===
He played for the Omaha Nighthawks of the United Football League for their 2011 season.

=== New York Jets ===
Griffin was signed to a future/reserve contract by the New York Jets on January 2, 2012. He was waived on August 8, 2012.

=== Second stint with the Nighthawks ===
He re-signed with the Omaha Nighthawks of the United Football League for their 2012 season.

=== Second stint with the Jets ===
Griffin was signed to the New York Jets' practice squad on November 5, 2012. He was signed to the active roster on December 28, 2012. On August 9, 2013, in the Jets' first preseason game against the Detroit Lions, Griffin suffered a broken leg. The injury occurred on a horse-collar tackle by linebacker Travis Lewis. Griffin was waived on August 11, 2013. He cleared waivers and was placed on the team's injured reserve list on August 13, 2013.
