= Clint Stitser =

American football player (born 1985)

No. 3
- Position: Placekicker

Personal information
- Born: May 19, 1985 (age 41); Reno, Nevada, U.S.
- Listed height: 6 ft 1 in (1.85 m)
- Listed weight: 200 lb (91 kg)

Career information
- High school: Robert McQueen (Reno)
- College: Fresno State
- NFL draft: 2008: undrafted

Career history
- New York Jets (2010)*; Seattle Seahawks (2010)*; Cincinnati Bengals (2010); Washington Redskins (2011)*; Las Vegas Locomotives (2011–2012)
- * Offseason or practice squad member only

Career NFL statistics
- Field goals made: 7
- Field goals attempted: 8
- Field goal %: 87.5
- Long Field Goal: 47
- Stats at Pro Football Reference

Clint Stitser (born May 19, 1985) is an American former professional football player who was a placekicker in the National Football League (NFL). He was signed by the New York Jets as an undrafted free agent in 2010. He played college football for the Fresno State Bulldogs. Stitser was also a member of the Seattle Seahawks, Cincinnati Bengals, Washington Redskins and Las Vegas Locomotives. He is currently a real estate broker in Reno, Nevada.

== College career ==
Stitser played college football for the Fresno State Bulldogs from 2003 to 2007. He made 71% of his field goals in his college career.

== Professional career ==
=== New York Jets ===
Stitser went undrafted in the 2008 NFL draft. He was signed by the New York Jets on April 6, 2010, but was waived on June 1.

=== Seattle Seahawks ===
He signed with the Seattle Seahawks on August 17 and played in one preseason game for the Seahawks. He made a 35-yard field goal in the game, and converted all three extra point attempts. He was waived on August 31.

=== Cincinnati Bengals ===
On November 30, he was signed by the Cincinnati Bengals, replacing ineffective starter Aaron Pettrey.

=== Washington Redskins ===
Stitser signed with the Washington Redskins on August 17, 2011, but was waived on August 30.

=== Las Vegas Locomotives ===
Stitser played for the Las Vegas Locomotives of the United Football League during the 2011 and 2012 seasons.
