= Delbert Alvarado =

Honduran gridiron football player (born 1989)

No. 4, 12, 19
- Position: Placekicker / Punter

Personal information
- Born: January 3, 1989 (age 37); La Ceiba, Honduras
- Listed height: 6 ft 0 in (1.83 m)
- Listed weight: 198 lb (90 kg)

Career information
- High school: Robinson (Tampa, Florida, U.S.)
- College: South Florida
- NFL draft: 2010: undrafted

Career history
- Dallas Cowboys (2010)*; Dallas Vigilantes (2011)*; Virginia Destroyers (2011); Dallas Cowboys (2012)*; Hamilton Tiger-Cats (2013)*; Montreal Alouettes (2013–2014)*; Ottawa Redblacks (2015); Tampa Bay Storm (2016–2017)
- * Offseason or practice squad member only

Awards and highlights
- UFL champion (2011)
- Stats at CFL.ca (archive)

Delbert Alvarado (born January 3, 1989) is a former professional Canadian football placekicker. He played for the Ottawa Redblacks of the Canadian Football League (CFL). He played college football at South Florida.

== College career ==
Alvarado played for South Florida from 2006 to 2009. He was a member of the Delta Zeta chapter of the Chi Phi fraternity.

== Professional career ==
Alvarado signed with the Dallas Cowboys in April 2010 as an undrafted free agent. He was released in July 2010.

He signed with the Dallas Vigilantes prior to the 2011 season, but he was released before the season began. He played for the Virginia Destroyers during the 2011 season.

In June 2012, he again signed with the Cowboys.

He signed with the Hamilton Tiger-Cats in May 2013. He signed with the Montreal Alouettes in June 2013. In October 2013, he was added to Montreal's practice roster. He was released in June 2014.

He signed with Ottawa prior to the 2015 season. He played in five games, making 11 of 14 field goal attempts and four of five convert attempts. He was released on August 1, 2015.

On May 19, 2016, Alvarado was assigned to the Tampa Bay Storm.
