= Ryan Colburn =

American football player (born 1986)

No. 15
- Position: Quarterback

Personal information
- Born: November 8, 1986 (age 39); Sacramento, California, U.S.
- Listed height: 6 ft 3 in (1.91 m)
- Listed weight: 220 lb (100 kg)

Career information
- High school: Central Valley Christian (Visalia, California)
- College: Fresno State
- NFL draft: 2011: undrafted

Career history
- New Orleans Saints (2011)*; Sacramento Mountain Lions (2011); Spokane Shock (2012)*
- * Offseason or practice squad member only
- Stats at Pro Football Reference

Ryan Colburn (born November 8, 1986) is an American former football quarterback. He was signed by the New Orleans Saints as an undrafted free agent in 2011. He played college football at Fresno State. Ryan attended high school at Central Valley Christian where he led his team to Valley Championships under Mark Gambini.

== Professional career ==
Colburn was signed by the New Orleans Saints as an undrafted free agent following the end of the NFL lockout in 2011. He was cut by the Saints one week later. He was then signed by the Sacramento Mountain Lions. Colburn started the first game of the 2011 season for the Mountain Lions.
