= Sacramento Mountain Lions =

American football team

Helmet	Logo
- Uniforms

General information
- Founded: 2009
- Folded: 2012
- Stadium: AT&T Park (2009); Spartan Stadium (2009); Hornet Stadium (2010–2011); Raley Field (2012)
- Headquartered: Sacramento, California
- Colors: Dark Metallic Gold, Sac Black, Sac Tan, Sac Dark Gold

Personnel
- Owner: Paul Pelosi (majority)

The Sacramento Mountain Lions were a professional American football team based in Sacramento, California, that played in the United Football League. The franchise originated as the California Redwoods, and played its home games in San Francisco and San Jose before relocating to Hornet Stadium in Sacramento in 2010, then to Raley Field in West Sacramento in 2012. The team was coached by Dennis Green for three of its four years of existence. Amid financial problems, the UFL folded in the middle of the 2012 season.

== Franchise history ==
=== California Redwoods (2009) ===
The team began play as the California Redwoods in October 2009. (Early trademark filings had suggested the UFL would name the team the "San Francisco Rockfish," a name that was dumped before any public announcement.) In the league's 2009 season, the Redwoods played were originally slated to play all of its home games at AT&T Park in San Francisco, including the first-ever UFL game. Due to a conflict with the San Francisco Giants, the UFL's first game was instead played in Las Vegas. Poor attendance in San Francisco led to the league relocating one of the Redwoods' home games to Spartan Stadium in San Jose.

Former NFL head coach Dennis Green was hired as the Redwoods' head coach prior to the season. He led the team to a 2–4 record in its first season, finishing in third place.

=== Sacramento Mountain Lions (2010–2012) ===
==== 2010 season ====
League commissioner Michael Huyghue announced shortly after the end of the 2009 regular season that the team would "likely" move permanently to San Jose for the 2010 season. On March 3, 2010, the league declared that the team would permanently relocate instead to Hornet Stadium in Sacramento, California for 2010, as part of a deal with Sacramento State University that saw the UFL provide a new artificial turf for the facility.

Despite the "California Redwoods" name still being valid (as the team remained the only UFL team in the state), league officials also announced that the California Redwoods branding would be abandoned. A new name was decided through a fan vote, though the name "Redwoods" remained a possible choice. On April 6, 2010, the league announced that the franchise would be known as the Sacramento Mountain Lions.

Additionally, head coach Dennis Green added the title of general manager following the season; he replaced league-wide general manager Rick Mueller, who handled the duties in 2009.

On September 25, the team won their first game in Sacramento, 24-20, becoming the first team to defeat the Florida Tuskers in the regular season, in front of a reported crowd of over 20,000.

==== 2012 season ====
Head coach Dennis Green left the team after the 2011 season amid dispute and legal action; he was replaced by Turk Schonert. The team also left Hornet Stadium, its home stadium of 2010 and 2011, without attempting to negotiate a lease renewal. Instead, the team signed a deal with Raley Field, a predominantly baseball-oriented park built for the Sacramento River Cats of the Pacific Coast League, for the team's four 2012 home games.

The UFL's financial woes, a new venue, less prominent coach, and continued on-field shortcomings hurt the Mountain Lions' attendance figures in 2012, although not nearly to the same extent as the other three UFL markets. Reports of players and staff not getting paid, as well as the 2011 season getting cut short, tested the devotion of fans, as many considered the UFL a dead product. The UFL abruptly halted the season again after four games and pledged to continue its season in 2013, a promise that never came to fruition because of lawsuits against the league.

== Season-by-season records ==
California Redwoods logo

Team	Season	W	L	T	Avg.	Finish	Postseason	Awards	Avg. attendance
California Redwoods	2009	2	4	0	.333	3rd			5,830
Sacramento Mountain Lions	2010	4	4	0	.500	3rd			18,125
Sacramento Mountain Lions	2011	1	3	0	.250	4th			18,775
Sacramento Mountain Lions	2012	1	3	0	.250	4th			
Totals		8	14	0	.350	–	–	–	14,171

=== Records vs. teams ===
This includes postseason games.

Team	Record	Percent
Hartford Colonials	2-2	.500
Las Vegas Locomotives	1–4	.200
Florida Tuskers/Virginia Destroyers	3–4	.429
Omaha Nighthawks	1–3	.250

=== Home, away, and neutral records ===
Location	Record	Percent
Home	3–7	.300
Away	4–6	.400
Neutral	0-0	.000

=== Starting quarterbacks ===
Season(s)	Regular season
California Redwoods
2009	Shane Boyd (4) / Mike McMahon (2)
Sacramento Mountain Lions
2010	Daunte Culpepper (8)
2011	Ryan Colburn (3) / McLeod Bethel-Thompson (2)
2012	Josh Johnson (2) / Jerrod Johnson (2)
