= 2011 UFL season =

American football league season

2011 United Football League season

Regular season
- Duration: September 15, 2011 – October 15, 2011

2011 UFL Championship Game
- Date: October 21, 2011
- Site: Virginia Beach Sportsplex, Virginia Beach, Virginia
- Champion: Virginia Destroyers
- Runner-up: Las Vegas Locomotives

The 2011 UFL season was the third season of the United Football League (UFL). The season, which was affected by franchise shifts and schedule delays due in part to the UFL's lingering financial issues (as well as a failure to capitalize on the National Football League's player lockout), began on September 15, 2011, and would have run through October 28, with a championship game set for the following weekend. The regular season was abandoned after the games of October 15 (with two weeks remaining), and the championship game moved up to October 21, when the Virginia Destroyers claimed their first UFL title by defeating the two-time defending champion Las Vegas Locomotives 17-3 at Virginia Beach Sportsplex.

== Pre-season planning and changes ==
Though it hoped for as many as six teams in place for the 2010 season, the UFL entered the 2011 season with only four, including having a presence in a new market, the Hampton Roads area of Virginia, which was granted an expansion franchise in August 2010, the Virginia Destroyers. The Destroyers' first off-season was marked with front office and coaching upheaval: Jim Speros had been named owner of the Destroyers before relinquishing control back to the league, who would assign control to former Hartford Colonials owner Bill Mayer in August 2011. The Destroyers off-season would see two coaches leave (see "Coaching Changes" below) as well as a general manager, Doug Williams, who resigned in February 2011 to accept the head football coaching position at his alma mater, Grambling State University.

The UFL went back from six to five teams on January 12, 2011, when the league announced it was "ceasing operations" of its Florida Tuskers franchise and moving the Tuskers' coaching staff and list of protected players to Virginia to serve in the same roles with the Destroyers in lieu of an expansion draft. The relocated coaching staff included Tuskers head coach Jay Gruden, who replaced original Destroyers coach Joe Moglia (who was reassigned to the open head coaching position in Omaha) but later accepted a coordinator position with Cincinnati in the NFL.

Prior to shuttering the Tuskers franchise (a move the UFL made citing decreased attendance and stadium issues in the Orlando area), the league had been aiming for as many as eight franchises for 2011; the league was "pretty committed" to a team in the Los Angeles area (a market it has explored in the past to various degrees), and plans were almost in place for a team in Portland, Oregon. Though "encouraging conversations" with franchise investors for a sixth team did take place, the UFL announced in February 2011 that new expansion plans would not be made in time for the start of the 2011 season, and that the league would remain at five teams. In March 2011, however, a report surfaced that a group in Chattanooga, Tennessee, led by Jim Bates and Jeremy Bates, was interested in pursuing a UFL team for that city. League officials acknowledged that Chattanooga was in the mix, but only for a 2012 expansion and that the 2011 season was fixed at five teams.

The UFL's franchise lineup would encounter further instability when, in late July 2011, it was revealed that the UFL was considering further contraction, with the Hartford Colonials a rumored victim. The league would confirm on August 10 that the Colonials would indeed be shuttered, with Colonials owner Bill Mayer given controlling ownership of the Virginia Destroyers. The UFL, realizing it could not afford to operate five teams at the moment, chose to contract the Colonials due to a high cost to operate out of Rentschler Field, where the team played its 2010 home schedule.

The 2011 UFL draft was held May 2, 2011, with an additional dispersal draft of Hartford Colonials players conducted on August 15 after the Colonials were shuttered. The UFL had also indicated that it would aggressively pursue the undrafted free agents that, because of the NFL's ongoing labor stoppage, could not be signed to NFL teams until said stoppage was lifted; the May 2 draft was in part designed to gain access to the undrafted free agent market.

=== Financial difficulties ===
The UFL's financial difficulties came to glaring light during the 2011 offseason, with the league delinquent on bills acquired during the previous season, having lost approximately $50 million in the 2010 season and facing about $6 million in debts to creditors. A few players and team personnel also claimed they have not received paychecks for the 2010 season.

Legal action against the UFL was also set into motion during the 2011 offseason, including:

- League investor Mark Cuban claimed the league defaulted on a $5 million loan
- A public relations firm that worked with the Sacramento Mountain Lions sought payment
- The Mayo Clinic also sought payment for medical bills and player physicals.

Most of these debts were paid in March 2011, according to reports. The Mayo Clinic's lawsuit, however, was still reported as open and pending in October 2011.

In an effort to avoid future problems, the league shifted most operation costs from the league to its teams for 2011, with each team president taking a greater role of its finances. League founder and majority owner William Hambrecht stated that this was because he was no longer interested in subsidizing an entire league and instead desired to focus his efforts on the Las Vegas Locomotives, of which he owns a greater share than the other teams.

Further news of the league's financial problems surfaced in mid-October, at the time of the season's truncation (see below). A source revealed to the UFLAccess website on October 12 that the league hadn't yet made full payments to Florida Tuskers staff who participated in the 2010 UFL championship game, which UFL VP/Communications Michael Preston confirmed was "among debts the UFL is working to clear." Additionally, UFL COO Bill Peterson filed a suit in Duval County, Florida (where the UFL is headquartered) claiming that the league owes him over $110,000 in back salary.

== Coaching changes ==
Team	2011 Coach	2010 Coach	Reason for leaving	Story/accomplishments
Hartford Colonials	Contracted	Chris Palmer, Jerry Glanville	Resigned, contracted	After leading the Colonials to a 3–5 record (.375) in 2010, Palmer resigned on February 15, 2011, to become the offensive coordinator of the Tennessee Titans of the NFL. Former NFL head coach Jerry Glanville was named as his replacement on March 21, 2011, but never got to coach the team before it was contracted on August 10. Glanville would be retained by the league as a consultant, color commentator for broadcasts on Comcast SportsNet, and liaison for potential expansion markets; his Colonials coaching staff was reassigned to other teams.
Omaha Nighthawks	Joe Moglia	Jeff Jagodzinski	Fired	After a 3–1 start in 2010, the Nighthawks lost their last four games to finish 3–5 (.375) and tied for last place, leading to Jagodzinski's dismissal on January 3, 2011. The UFL replaced Jagodzinski on January 12 with Joe Moglia, an Omaha resident who moves over from same position in Virginia. Prior to joining the UFL, Moglia's coaching experience included working as defensive coordinator for Dartmouth College in the early 1980s and most recently serving as an unpaid assistant with the Nebraska Cornhuskers. In between those stints, Mogila had spent 27 years out of football, during which he was an executive with Merrill Lynch and TD Ameritrade; he still serves as chairman of the latter company, which is also the name sponsor of the Nighthawks' new stadium.
Virginia Destroyers	Marty Schottenheimer	Joe Moglia, Jay Gruden	Reassigned, resigned	Moglia was named the Destroyers' head coach in November 2010 when the Destroyers were an expansion team, but was transferred to Omaha (see above) when the Florida Tuskers' operations, including its coaching staff, were merged into Virginia's. Jay Gruden, who went 5-4 (.556) as Tuskers coach in 2010 (including a loss in the championship game) accepted the offensive coordinator position with the NFL's Cincinnati Bengals on February 2. The Destroyers, after initially revealing they had a tentative agreement with an unstated former NFL head coach on March 4 announced Schottenheimer as their head coach March 23. Schottenheimer was a head coach in the NFL from 1984 to 1998 and 2001 to 2006, with a career record of 205–139–1 (.604).

== Stadium changes ==
Two UFL teams played in new stadiums in 2011. The Omaha Nighthawks, who played at Johnny Rosenblatt Stadium in 2010, moved to the brand new TD Ameritrade Park in downtown Omaha. The Virginia Destroyers, who as the Florida Tuskers played in Orlando's Citrus Bowl, called Virginia Beach Sportsplex in Virginia Beach their new home in 2010; the currently undersized Sportsplex underwent a temporary expansion to accommodate the Destroyers.

The Las Vegas Locomotives sought a lower-cost alternative to the high rate of rent for Sam Boyd Stadium and considered moving to the smaller Cashman Field for 2011, but instead opted to return to Sam Boyd Stadium, where they wound up playing one home game (October 8) before the league's regular season was cancelled (the Locos' two remaining home games were dropped due to the cancellation); low attendance at the stadium despite a renewed public relations push was a factor in the abbreviation of the 2011 season, as the Locos drew only 6,500 fans to their lone home game, significantly less than 2009 or 2010.

The Hartford Colonials, in part because of a change of management at Rentschler Field, experienced significant delays in renewing their lease with the stadium and had backup plans to relocate to another lower-cost stadium such as Dillon Stadium or one of the two stadiums at Willow Brook Park (New Britain Stadium or Veterans Stadium) if an agreement could not be reached, although both of these stadiums are believed to be less than ideal for the UFL. The UFL reached an agreement with the operators of Rentschler Field in late June 2011 before deciding to suspend the franchise outright.

== Season recap ==
With the tumult and delays of the offseason seemingly behind it, the UFL began its 2011 season on September 15, with the Virginia Destroyers winning 23-13 over the Omaha Nighthawks. The Destroyers were led by quarterback Chris Greisen, who directed 2nd quarter scoring drives of 81 and 62 yards; Delbert Alvarado added three field goals. The game was a debut in three ways: It was the start of the season, the first game for the Destroyers, and the first game for the Nighthawks in their new home, TD Ameritrade Park Omaha. The game attracted an announced crowd of 15,836, the first Nighthawks home game that didn't sell out.

Much in the same way as the league's first two seasons, the Destroyers and Las Vegas Locomotives were the on-field class of the league, with both teams sporting 3-1 records at the regular season's cancellation. The 2011 Destroyers roster included 21 former Florida Tuskers, who were league runners-up in each of the first two seasons. Chris Greisen led the team at quarterback, with a backfield that included the league's leading rusher and offensive player of the year, running back Dominic Rhodes, who set a league record 217 yards rushing in an October 7 game against Sacramento. The Locos, coached by Jim Fassel, were led by 2nd-year starting quarterback Chase Clement and running back Marcel Shipp.

The Locos and Destroyers would meet in the rescheduled (to October 21) UFL championship game at Virginia Beach Sportsplex. The Destroyers would prevail in the game 17-3, exacting a bit of revenge on the Locos' the league's 2-time defending champs (at the expense of the Florida Tuskers). The Destroyers were keyed by a stifling defense that overwhelmed the Locos offense, who managed only 154 total yards. The game MVP was Destroyers safety and Virginia Beach native Aaron Rouse, who had three pass interceptions on the evening and returned one for a touchdown. The win gave Destroyers head coach Marty Schottenheimer his first league title as a professional head coach.

The Sacramento Mountain Lions and Omaha Nighthawks struggled on the field during the 2011 season. The MoLos, coached by third-year coach Dennis Green, lost their first three games of the 2011 season, falling to the bottom of the standings; after a change of quarterback, they later rebounded to win what would be their last regular season game as well as their consolation game against Omaha. Sacramento was among the best-supported teams in the UFL, with all three games at Hornet Stadium being at or near sellouts. The Nighthawks were marked by Joe Moglia's return to coaching football after 27 years out of the game, and many of his unusual efforts (multiple quarterbacks and the implementation of a spread offense) were ineffective against the rest of the league. Only a narrow 33-30 win over Sacramento in Week 2 prevented the Nighthawks from achieving a perfectly bad season and was the only game in which the Nighthawks scored more than one touchdown.

== Schedule ==
The UFL initially planned to start its 2011 regular season the second weekend of August—a date that, while considerably earlier than the start dates for previous seasons, would have allowed the UFL to gain attention while the National Football League would normally be in its preseason (and had the potential to provide even more attention had the NFL's labor problems affected its preseason); the move was also intended to provide the UFL the opportunity to stage games on Sunday for the first time ever.

The league, when it was planning for six teams, intended for a 10-game regular season over 11 weeks (one bye week for each team). After several delays, the UFL released its original 2011 schedule on June 9, one that featured five teams (including the Hartford Colonials) playing eight games over a 10-week span (double round robin, two bye weeks for each team) that was to have begun the weekend of August 13–14 and culminate with the UFL championship game the weekend of October 21–23. The UFL announced a delay in training camps and the regular season on July 19, with the season to begin in mid-September, the same month its 2010 season began. When the UFL announced the Colonials' contraction on August 10, they also confirmed that the remaining four teams would each play a 6-game schedule mirroring the pattern used in the league's inaugural season in 2009 (double round robin, 1 bye week for each team), and also released the opening week games (Virginia at Omaha on September 15, Las Vegas at Sacramento on September 17), with the balance of the schedule released on August 16. The UFL championship game, under this new plan, would have been played weekend of November 4–5 at a site to be determined in a similar manner to the previous season, when the UFL awarded Omaha the title game based on advance ticket sales, team record, and fan reception.

On October 16, 2011, after the 5th week of the season had concluded, a report appeared on a Virginia Destroyers fan site that the UFL was considering canceling the final two weeks of the regular season (Weeks 6 and 7) and moving up the championship game to the weekend of October 21; a person associated with the Omaha Nighthawks would confirm that original report to the Omaha World-Herald later on the 16th. The following day (October 17), the UFL did indeed announce that the final two weeks would be canceled. Halting the season, according to UFL leadership, would save the league $3.5 million, mainly in player wages, and help ensure the possibility for a 2012 season.

The season wasn't entirely finished, however: The UFL also confirmed that the Destroyers' October 21 home game would change from a regular season game against the Nighthawks to the 2011 UFL championship game against Las Vegas (both teams finished tied for the top spot in the league's standings). The Destroyers' home, Virginia Beach Sportsplex was chosen as the title game's venue based in part on the Destroyers' home attendance (both their home games attracted crowds of over 12,000) and the teams' social media following. (Ironically, the newly rescheduled championship game would take place on the same weekend as when it was scheduled in the original 5-team schedule.)

Additionally, the 3rd and 4th place teams, Sacramento and Omaha, would play what the UFL termed a "consolation game" at TD Ameritrade Park Omaha, in effect moving the October 28 game between those teams up one week; that consolation game would also take place on October 21, concurrent with the Locos/Destroyers title game. Part of the reasoning for scheduling the consolation game in Omaha was to avoid a mass refund on the 15,000 tickets sold the Nighthawks' October 28 home game, which was one of the cancelled games.

Week	Date	Kickoff	Visitor	Home	Result	Site	Attendance	TV
1	Thursday September 15	7:00PM (CT)	Virginia Destroyers	Omaha Nighthawks	VA 23, OMA 13	TD Ameritrade Park Omaha	15,836	None
1	Saturday September 17	7:30PM (PT)	Las Vegas Locomotives	Sacramento Mountain Lions	LV 23, SAC 17	Hornet Stadium	19,938	CSN California
2 (Bye: Omaha & Sacramento)	Saturday September 24	7:00PM (ET)	Las Vegas Locomotives	Virginia Destroyers	LV 17, VA 34	Virginia Beach Sportsplex	12,167	None
3 (Bye: Las Vegas & Virginia)	Saturday October 1	4:00PM (PT)	Omaha Nighthawks	Sacramento Mountain Lions	OMA 33, SAC 30	Hornet Stadium	17,612	CSN California
4	Friday October 7	7:00PM (ET)	Sacramento Mountain Lions	Virginia Destroyers	SAC 6, VA 28	Virginia Beach Sportsplex	12,617	CSN California, CSN+ Mid-Atlantic
4	Saturday October 8	5:00PM (PT)	Omaha Nighthawks	Las Vegas Locomotives	OMA 10, LV 30	Sam Boyd Stadium	6,500	None
5	Saturday October 15	4:00PM (PT)	Virginia Destroyers	Sacramento Mountain Lions	VA 20, SAC 27 (OT)	Hornet Stadium	18,794	None
5	Saturday October 15	7:00PM (CT)	Las Vegas Locomotives	Omaha Nighthawks	LV 13, OMA 6	TD Ameritrade Park Omaha	17,697	None

Had the regular season not been cut short, the following games would have been played:

Week	Date	Kickoff	Visitor	Home	Site	TV
6	Friday October 21	7:00PM (ET)	Omaha Nighthawks	Virginia Destroyers	Virginia Beach Sportsplex	CSN+ Mid-Atlantic
6	Saturday October 22	9:00PM (PT)	Sacramento Mountain Lions	Las Vegas Locomotives	Sam Boyd Stadium	None
7	Thursday October 27	7:00PM (PT)	Virginia Destroyers	Las Vegas Locomotives	Sam Boyd Stadium	None
7	Friday October 28	7:00PM (CT)	Sacramento Mountain Lions	Omaha Nighthawks	TD Ameritrade Park Omaha	None

=== Postseason ===
Date	Game	Kickoff	Visitor	Home	Result	Site	Attendance	TV
Championship game	Friday October 21	8:00PM (ET)	Las Vegas Locomotives	Virginia Destroyers	LV 3, VA 17	Virginia Beach Sportsplex	14,172	CSN Mid-Atlantic
Consolation game	Friday October 21	7:00 PM (CT)	Sacramento Mountain Lions	Omaha Nighthawks	SAC 25, OMA 19 (OT)	TD Ameritrade Park Omaha	10,123	None

== Broadcasting ==
The UFL entered the 2011 season without any national television partner. The league's previous 2-year television contracts with Versus and HDNet expired on December 31, 2010, as did a 1-year local deal with regional cable network NESN, which carried two Hartford Colonials games in 2010. The UFL would spend its 2011 off-season seeking new TV deals that would generate revenue for the league, something the previous contracts did not do (the league had to reimburse the networks for production costs in the previous deal). Seeking a possible opportunity with the NFL players lockout, the UFL considered partnerships with networks other than Versus and HDNet, including those in partnership with the NFL; the UFL's rationale was that if the NFL lockout endangered its 2011 preseason and regular season, the NFL's TV partners would seek alternative programming such as the UFL as program filler. By the spring, CBS Sports (an NFL partner) and Turner Sports (whose TNT carried the NFL in the 1990s) were mentioned as possible UFL partners. (Fox Sports was also mentioned; ESPN was on record as not being interested.)

But by July, when the UFL announced its season delay, no new TV partnerships had been announced; the uncertainty over labor problems with the NFL (which were beginning to reach a resolution by that time) as well as the National Basketball Association (of which TNT is a broadcast partner) left the networks in a holding pattern in regards to TV sports properties. During the same offseason, Versus's parent company Comcast purchased NBC and thus gained access to that network's NFL contract, deciding not to renew its deal with the UFL. On August 10, during its announcement of the Hartford Colonials' suspension, the UFL announced it would have one national TV partner, HDNet, to cover the 2011 season, with regional sports networks in the league's markets taking up the slack. HDNet then released a statement on September 2 denying it had ever agreed to carry any UFL games in 2011, leaving the league without any television partners.

The lack of a national TV partner would force the UFL to rely solely on local TV partnerships; two UFL teams, Sacramento and Virginia, would reach deals with their regions' Comcast SportsNet networks (CSN California and CSN Mid-Atlantic, respectively) for select games, while Las Vegas and Omaha would arrange deals with local cable carriers to relay the other networks' broadcasts to their home markets. Internet streaming was also made available for the games that are televised through Veetle, a streaming video service, which also made the games available for viewers on mobile devices, a feature not available for the 2009 and 2010 seasons.

The league's original business model had anticipated the league owners absorbing their losses during its first two years of operation, then securing a paying broadcast contract in 2011; without it, even at the 20,000 fans per game that the teams in Sacramento and Omaha were drawing, each team was doomed to lose approximately $6 million per year under the league's business model. The failure to secure the television contract was thus a major factor in the league's failure.

=== Local broadcast partners ===
Team	Radio	TV
Las Vegas Locomotives	KBAD (920AM)	Cox Cable 128 (replays only)
Omaha Nighthawks	KOZN (1620AM)	Cox Cable 2 (replays only)
Sacramento Mountain Lions	KHTK (1140AM)	Comcast SportsNet California (2 home games)
Virginia Destroyers	WVSP-FM (94.1FM), WGH-AM (1310 AM)	Comcast SportsNet Mid-Atlantic(Weeks 4, 5, and 6)

== Standings ==
United Football League
	W	L	T	PCT	PF	PA	STK
z-Virginia Destroyers	3	1	0	.750	105	63	L1
z-Las Vegas Locomotives	3	1	0	.750	83	67	W2
x-Omaha Nighthawks	1	3	0	.250	62	96	L2
x-Sacramento Mountain Lions	1	3	0	.250	80	104	W1

z-Virginia and Las Vegas were awarded berths in the 2011 UFL championship game when the balance of the regular season was cancelled on October 17
x-Omaha and Sacramento would play in a post-season consolation game

== Statistical leaders ==
The following statistical leaders were for the 2011 UFL regular season (through the 5th of seven scheduled weeks), at which time each team had played four regular season games:

Team
Points scored	Virginia Destroyers (105)
Total offense	Virginia Destroyers (1178 yards gained)
Rushing offense	Virginia Destroyers (548 yards)
Passing offense	Omaha Nighthawks (779 yards)
Fewest points allowed	Virginia Destroyers (63)
Total defense	Virginia Destroyers (900 yards allowed)
Rushing defense	Virginia Destroyers (303 yards allowed)
Passing defense	Virginia Destroyers (597 yards allowed)
Individual
Scoring	Dominic Rhodes, Virginia (36 points)
Touchdowns	Dominic Rhodes, Virginia (6)
Most field goals made	Delbert Alvarado, Virginia (7)
Rushing yards	Dominic Rhodes, Virginia (410)
Passing yards	Jeremiah Masoli, Omaha (808)
Touchdown passes	Ryan Colburn, Sacramento (5)
Pass receptions	Chris Davis, Omaha (29)
Receiving yards	Chris Davis, Omaha (247)
All-purpose yards	Dominic Rhodes, Virginia (502)
Interceptions	Tony Taylor, Virginia, and John Busing, Sacramento (3 each)
Punting	Tom Malone, Sacramento (44.7 yards/punt)
Tackles	Dontarrious Thomas, Sacramento (27 total tackles)
Sacks	Jason Parker, Sacramento, and Angelo Crowell, Omaha (3 each)

== Awards ==
=== Players of the week ===
Week	Offense	Defense	Special Teams
1	Chase Clement, QB, Las Vegas; Dominic Rhodes, RB, Virginia	Marquis Floyd, CB, Las Vegas	Aaron Woods, WR/KR, Sacramento
2	Chris Greisen, QB, Virginia	Tony Taylor, LB, Virginia	Delbert Alvarado, K, Virginia
3	Jeremiah Masoli, QB, Omaha; John David Washington, RB, Sacramento	Stuart Schweigert, S, Omaha	Jeff Wolfert, K, Omaha
4	Dominic Rhodes, RB, Virginia	Tony Taylor, LB, Virginia	Clint Stitser, K, Las Vegas
5	McLeod Bethel-Thompson, QB, Sacramento	Angelo Crowell, LB, Omaha	Aaron Woods, WR, Sacramento

=== Players and Coach of the Year ===
Players of the Year

- Offense: Dominic Rhodes, RB, Virginia Destroyers
- Defense: Stuart Schweigert, S, Omaha Nighthawks
- Special Teams: Aaron Woods, WR/KR, Sacramento Mountain Lions

Coach of the Year

- Marty Schottenheimer, Virginia Destroyers

=== UFL championship game MVP ===
- Aaron Rouse, CB Virginia Destroyers
