= East–West Shrine Bowl =

US postseason college football all-star game

- See logo history
- Stadium: Ford Center at The Star
- Location: Frisco, Texas
- Previous stadiums: Kezar Stadium (1925–1941, 1943–1968, 1971–1973); Stanford Stadium (1969, 1974–2000); Tulane Stadium (1942); Oakland Coliseum (1970); AT&T Park (2001–2005); Alamodome (2006); Reliant Stadium (2007); Robertson Stadium (2008–2009); Orlando Citrus Bowl (2010–2011); Tropicana Field (2012–2020) Allegiant Stadium (2022–2023); Ford Center at The Star (2024); AT&T Stadium (2025)
- Previous locations: San Francisco, California (1925–1941, 1943–1968, 1971–1973, 2001–2005); New Orleans, Louisiana (1942); Stanford, California (1969, 1974–2000); Oakland, California (1971); San Antonio, Texas (2006); Houston, Texas (2007–2009); Orlando, Florida (2010–2011); St. Petersburg, Florida (2012–2020); Paradise, Nevada (2022–2023); Frisco, Texas (2024); Arlington, Texas (2025)
- Operated: 1925–present
- Website: shrinebowl.com

Sponsors
- Shriners (1925–present)

Former names
- East–West Shrine Game (1925–2019)

2026 matchup
- East vs. West (West 21–17)

The East–West Shrine Bowl is a postseason college football all-star game that has been played annually since 1925; through January 2019, it was known as the East–West Shrine Game. The game is sponsored by the fraternal group Shriners International, and the net proceeds are earmarked to some of the Shrine's charitable works, most notably the Shriners Hospitals for Children. The game's slogan is "Strong Legs Run That Weak Legs May Walk."

Teams consist of players from colleges across the country, and players may be college seniors or college underclassmen who have declared for the NFL Draft who are eligible to play for their schools. The game and the practice sessions leading up to it attract dozens of scouts from professional teams. Since 1985, some players of Canadian university football have also been invited, even though U Sports and the NCAA play by different football codes.

The game has been played in various locations. Most editions have been held in California, although the most recent edition played there was in 2005. The game has been played in Texas since the February 2024 edition. Since 1979, the game has been played in January or February, and has been played on January 10 or later since 1986. The later game dates allow players from teams whose schools were involved in bowl games to participate.

== History ==
=== 20th century ===
For most of its history, the game was played in the San Francisco Bay Area, usually at San Francisco's Kezar Stadium or Stanford Stadium at Stanford University, with Pacific Bell Park/SBC Park (now Oracle Park) as a host in its final years in Northern California. For more than half of the games played in the Bay Area, entertainment was provided by the marching band from Santa Cruz High School.

In January 1942, the game was played in New Orleans, due to the December 7, 1941, Japanese attack on Pearl Harbor. This one-year relocation was based upon fears that playing the game on the West Coast could make the contest and the stadium a potential target for an additional attack. The game, originally planned for January 1 in San Francisco, was played on January 3 at Tulane Stadium, two days after the 1942 Sugar Bowl was held there.

During this era, the game was not restricted to college seniors—for example, the January 1944 edition of the game featured Robert Hoernschemeyer, Dean Sensanbaugher, and Herman Wedemeyer, each then college freshmen.

A similar all-star game, the North–South Shrine Game, was played in Miami from 1948 to 1973, and a final time in Pontiac, Michigan, in 1976.

=== Logo ===
Prior to the 50th edition of the game, contested in December 1974, a player from the Boston College Eagles, running back Mike Esposito, was photographed at Shriners Hospitals for Children in San Francisco holding the hand of a young patient while walking down a hallway—the photo was adapted as the Shrine Bowl logo. Esposito and the former patient, Nicole Urteaga, met again prior to the 100th edition of the game, played in January 2025.

=== 21st century ===
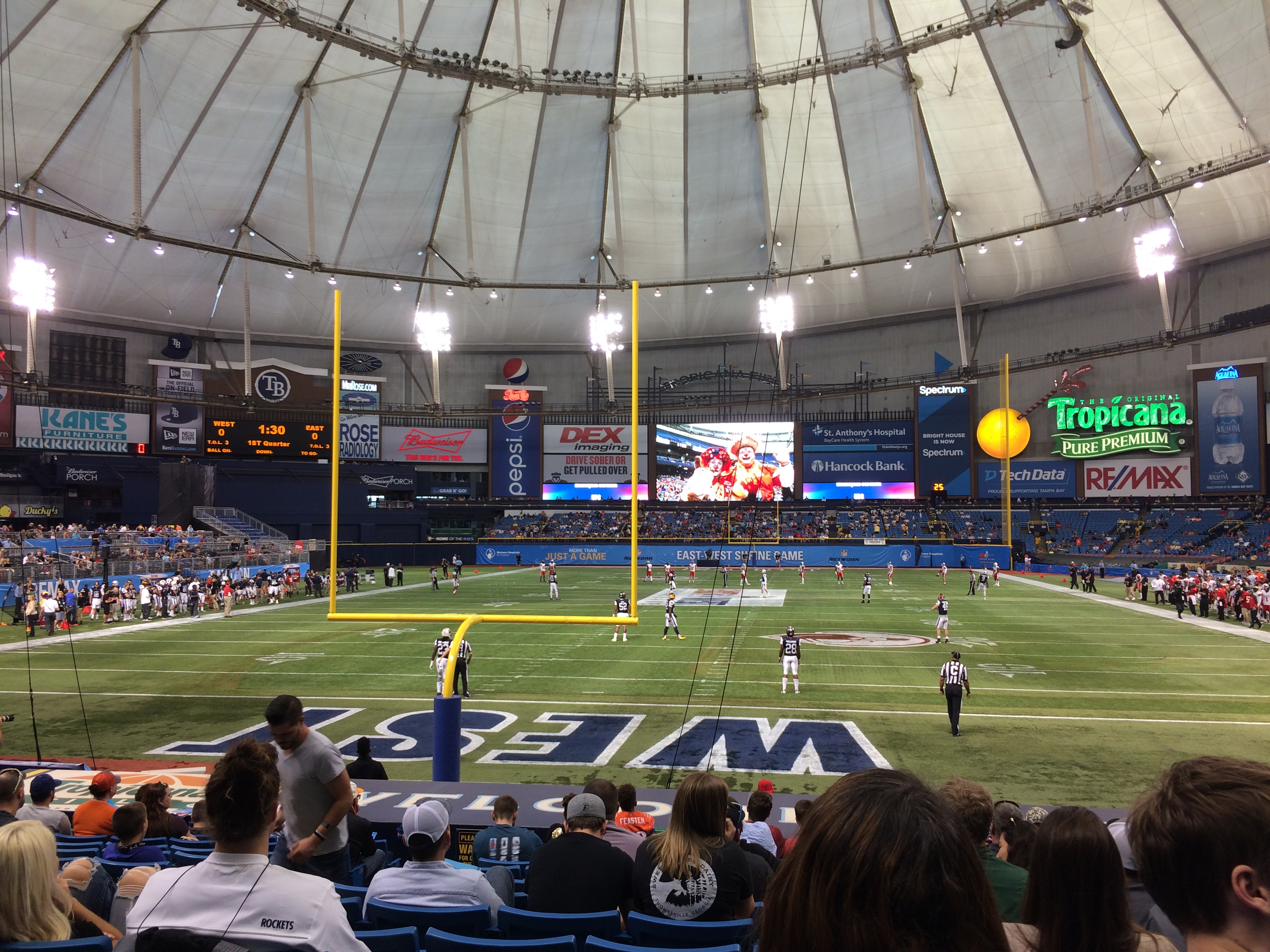
Kickoff of the 2017 game at Tropicana Field

In 2006, the game moved to Texas, leaving the San Francisco Bay area for the first time since 1942, and was played at the Alamodome in San Antonio. In 2007, the game relocated to Houston and was played at Reliant Stadium, home of the NFL's Houston Texans, to be closer to one of the 22 Shriners Hospitals for Children; Texas has two Shriner's hospitals, one in Houston and the other in Galveston. The 2008 and 2009 games were held at Robertson Stadium on the campus of the University of Houston.

In 2010, the game moved to Florida, and was held at the Citrus Bowl in Orlando. Television coverage moved from ESPN/ESPN2 to the NFL Network, starting with the 2011 game. After two years in Orlando, the 2012 game was held at Tropicana Field in St. Petersburg; it was the sixth different venue (in five cities and three states) in a span of eight contests.

Starting with the January 2017 game, the NFL supplies coaching staffs for the game, drawing from assistant coaches of teams who did not advance to the NFL postseason, and the game is now officiated by NFL officials. The game is played under NFL rules, with some restrictions, such as no motion or shifts by the offense, and no stunts or blitzes by the defense. Prior to the January 2020 playing, organizers renamed the game from East–West Shrine Game to East–West Shrine Bowl.

The 2021 edition of the game, which had been scheduled for January 23, was cancelled due to concerns related to the COVID-19 pandemic.

In July 2021, it was announced that Allegiant Stadium would host the East–West Shrine Bowl on February 3, 2022; the game was scheduled as part of festivities for the 2022 Pro Bowl being held there the following Sunday.

The game moved to Ford Center at The Star in Frisco, Texas, for its January 2024 playing. The 100th edition of the game, held in January 2025, was held at AT&T Stadium in Arlington, Texas. The January 2026 edition returned to Ford Center at The Star.

== Game results ==
Through the January 2026 game (101 editions, 100 games played), the West leads all-time with 55 wins to the East's 40 wins, while 5 games have tied.

No.	Date	Winner	Score	Location	Notes
1	December 26, 1925	West	6–0	San Francisco	†
2	January 1, 1927	West	7–3	San Francisco	
3	December 26, 1927	West	16–6	San Francisco	
4	December 29, 1928	East	20–0	San Francisco	
5	January 1, 1930	East	19–7	San Francisco	
6	December 27, 1930	West	3–0	San Francisco	
7	January 1, 1932	East	6–0	San Francisco	
8	January 2, 1933	West	21–13	San Francisco	
9	January 1, 1934	West	12–0	San Francisco	
10	January 1, 1935	West	19–13	San Francisco	
11	January 1, 1936	East	19–3	San Francisco	
12	January 1, 1937	East	3–0	San Francisco	
13	January 1, 1938	Tie	0–0	San Francisco	
14	January 2, 1939	West	14–0	San Francisco	
15	January 1, 1940	West	28–11	San Francisco	
16	January 1, 1941	West	20–14	San Francisco	
17	January 3, 1942	Tie	6–6	New Orleans	
18	January 1, 1943	East	13–12	San Francisco	
19	January 1, 1944	Tie	13–13	San Francisco	
20	January 1, 1945	West	13–7	San Francisco	
21	January 1, 1946	Tie	7–7	San Francisco	
22	January 1, 1947	West	13–9	San Francisco	
23	January 1, 1948	East	40–9	San Francisco	
24	January 1, 1949	East	14–12	San Francisco	
25	December 31, 1949	East	28–6	San Francisco	
26	December 30, 1950	West	16–7	San Francisco	
27	December 29, 1951	East	15–14	San Francisco	
28	December 27, 1952	East	21–20	San Francisco	
29	January 2, 1954	West	31–7	San Francisco	
30	January 1, 1955	East	13–12	San Francisco	
31	December 31, 1955	East	29–6	San Francisco	
32	December 29, 1956	West	7–6	San Francisco	
33	December 28, 1957	West	27–13	San Francisco	
34	December 27, 1958	East	26–14	San Francisco	
35	January 2, 1960	West	21–14	San Francisco	
36	December 31, 1960	East	7–0	San Francisco	
37	December 30, 1961	West	21–8	San Francisco	
38	December 29, 1962	East	25–19	San Francisco	
39	December 28, 1963	Tie	6–6	San Francisco	
40	January 2, 1965	West	11–7	San Francisco	
41	December 31, 1965	West	22–7	San Francisco	
42	December 31, 1966	East	45–22	San Francisco	
43	December 30, 1967	East	16–14	San Francisco	
44	December 28, 1968	West	18–7	San Francisco	
45	December 27, 1969	West	15–0	Stanford, California	
46	January 2, 1971	West	17–13	Oakland, California	
47	December 31, 1971	West	17–13	San Francisco	
48	December 30, 1972	East	9–3	San Francisco	
49	December 29, 1973	East	35–7	San Francisco	
50	December 28, 1974	East	16–14	Stanford, California	

No.	Date	Winner	Score	Location	Notes
51	January 3, 1976	West	21–14	Stanford, California	
52	January 2, 1977	West	30–14	Stanford, California	
53	December 31, 1977	West	23–3	Stanford, California	
54	January 6, 1979	East	56–17	Stanford, California	
55	January 5, 1980	West	20–10	Stanford, California	
56	January 10, 1981	East	21–3	Stanford, California	
57	January 9, 1982	West	20–13	Stanford, California	
58	January 15, 1983	East	26–25	Stanford, California	
59	January 7, 1984	East	27–19	Stanford, California	
60	January 5, 1985	West	21–10	Stanford, California	
61	January 11, 1986	East	18–7	Stanford, California	
62	January 10, 1987	West	24–21	Stanford, California	
63	January 16, 1988	West	16–13	Stanford, California	
64	January 15, 1989	East	24–6	Stanford, California	
65	January 21, 1990	West	22–21	Stanford, California	
66	January 26, 1991	West	24–21	Stanford, California	
67	January 19, 1992	West	14–6	Stanford, California	
68	January 24, 1993	East	31–17	Stanford, California	
69	January 15, 1994	West	29–28	Stanford, California	
70	January 14, 1995	West	30–28	Stanford, California	
71	January 13, 1996	West	34–18	Stanford, California	
72	January 11, 1997	East	17–13	Stanford, California	
73	January 10, 1998	West	24–7	Stanford, California	
74	January 16, 1999	East	20–10	Stanford, California	
75	January 15, 2000	East	35–21	Stanford, California	
76	January 13, 2001	West	20–10	San Francisco	
77	January 12, 2002	West	21–13	San Francisco	
78	January 11, 2003	East	20–17	San Francisco	
79	January 10, 2004	West	28–7	San Francisco	Notes
80	January 15, 2005	East	45–27	San Francisco	Notes
81	January 21, 2006	West	35–31	San Antonio	Notes
82	January 20, 2007	West	21–3	Houston	Notes
83	January 19, 2008	West	31–13	Houston	Notes
84	January 17, 2009	East	24–19	Houston	Notes
85	January 23, 2010	East	13–10	Orlando, Florida	Notes
86	January 22, 2011	East	25–8	Orlando, Florida	Notes
87	January 21, 2012	West	24–17	St. Petersburg, Florida	Notes
88	January 19, 2013	West	28–13	St. Petersburg, Florida	Notes
89	January 18, 2014	East	23–13	St. Petersburg, Florida	Notes
90	January 17, 2015	East	19–3	St. Petersburg, Florida	Notes
91	January 23, 2016	West	29–9	St. Petersburg, Florida	Notes
92	January 21, 2017	West	10–3	St. Petersburg, Florida	Notes
93	January 20, 2018	West	14–10	St. Petersburg, Florida	Notes
94	January 19, 2019	West	21–17	St. Petersburg, Florida	Notes
95	January 18, 2020	East	31–27	St. Petersburg, Florida	Notes
96	~~January 23, 2021~~	Canceled			
97	February 3, 2022	West	25–24	Paradise, Nevada	Notes
98	February 2, 2023	West	12–3	Paradise, Nevada	Notes
99	February 1, 2024	West	26–11	Frisco, Texas	
100	January 30, 2025	East	25–0	Arlington, Texas	
101	January 27, 2026	West	21–17	Frisco, Texas	

† For the December 1925 game, NCAA records list a 7–0 final score, while contemporary newspaper accounts report 6–0.

== MVP award ==
The game first named a Most Valuable Player for the January 1945 playing (Bob Waterfield, UCLA quarterback), and named a single MVP through the December 1952 game. Starting with the January 1954 game, two MVPs are selected for each game; they receive the William H. Coffman Award for Most Outstanding Offensive Player, and the E. Jack Spaulding Award for Most Outstanding Defensive Player. Coffman was managing director of the game for 40 years, while Spaulding was one of the organizers of the inaugural playing of the game. MVPs starting with the January 2000 game are listed below.

List of Shrine Bowl MVPs
Year	Offensive winner	College	Position	Defensive winner	College	Position
2000	Marcus Knight	Michigan	WR	Erik Flowers	Arizona State	DE
2001	Steve Smith	Utah	WR	Leo Barnes	Southern Mississippi	DB
2002	Deonce Whitaker	San Jose State	RB	Everick Rawls	Texas	LB
2003	Donald Lee	Mississippi State	TE	Tully Banta-Cain	Cal	DE
2004	Ryan Dinwiddie	Boise State	QB	Brandon Chillar	UCLA	LB
2005	Stefan LeFors	Louisville	QB	Alex Green	Duke	S
2006	Reggie McNeal	Texas A&M	QB	James Wyche	Syracuse	DE
2007	Jeff Rowe	Nevada	QB	Dan Bazuin	Central Michigan	DE
2008	Josh Johnson	San Diego	QB	Spencer Larsen	Arizona	LB
2009	Marlon Lucky	Nebraska	RB	Michael Tauiliili	Duke	LB
2010	Mike Kafka	Northwestern	QB	O'Brien Schofield	Wisconsin	DE
2011	Delone Carter	Syracuse	RB	Martin Parker	Richmond	DT
2012	Lennon Creer	Louisiana Tech	RB	Nick Sukay	Penn State	CB
2013	Chad Bumphis	Mississippi State	WR	Nigel Malone	Kansas State	CB
2014	Jimmy Garoppolo	Eastern Illinois	QB	Ethan Westbrooks	West Texas A&M	DE
2015	Marvin Kloss	South Florida	K	Za'Darius Smith	Kentucky	DE
2016	Vernon Adams	Oregon	QB	Michael Caputo	Wisconsin	S
2017	Elijah McGuire	Louisiana–Lafayette	RB	Trey Hendrickson	Florida Atlantic	DE
2018	Daurice Fountain	Northern Iowa	WR	Natrell Jamerson	Wisconsin	S
2019	Terry Godwin	Georgia	WR	Justin Hollins	Oregon	LB
2020	Benny LeMay	Charlotte	RB	Luther Kirk	Illinois State	S
2022	E. J. Perry	Brown	QB	Diego Fagot	Navy	LB
2023	Jake Moody	Michigan	K	Trey Dean III	Florida	S
2024	Frank Gore Jr.	Southern Miss	RB	Jarius Monroe	Tulane	CB
2025	Jacory Croskey-Merritt	Arizona	RB	O'Donnell Fortune	South Carolina	CB
2026	Mark Gronowski	Iowa	QB	Mason Reiger	Wisconsin	LB

== Canadian football invitees ==
Although the game is an American football competition, a limited number of players of Canadian university football, contested under Canadian football rules, have participated since 1985. The first Canadian football participant was offensive lineman Tom Spoletini of the Calgary Dinos, who played in the January 1985 game.

Usually, Canadian players on the West team come from Canada West schools, while Canadian players on the East team are from the other three Canadian conferences (Ontario University Athletics, Atlantic University Sport, and Quebec Student Sport Federation). One exception was Sean McEwen of the Calgary Dinos (a Canada West school), who played on the East squad in the 2016 game. The only Canadian team that competed under American football rules is the now-defunct Simon Fraser Red Leafs; the only Simon Fraser player to be invited to the game was Ibrahim Khan, who played in 2004.

In 2024, the lone Canadian invitee was Qwan'tez Stiggers, an American who did not play college football but instead became a professional player for the Toronto Argonauts of the Canadian Football League. Through the 2024 game, the Calgary Dinos had the most invitees, with 13. The 2025 and 2026 games have included Canada-born invitees from US-based college programs.

Canadian football invitees to the East–West Shrine Bowl
Year	West team	East team
1985	Tom Spoletini (OL, Calgary Dinos)	(none)
1986	Kent Warnock (DE, Calgary Dinos)	Mike Schad (OT, Queen's Gaels)
1987	Leo Groenewegen (OT, UBC Thunderbirds)	Louie Godry (OL, Guelph Gryphons)
1988	Craig Watson (OL, Calgary Dinos)	Pierre Vercheval (OL, Western Mustangs)
1989	Brent Korte (DE, Alberta Golden Bears)	Leroy Blugh (LB, Bishop's Gaiters)
1990	Mark Singer (LB, Alberta Golden Bears)	Chris Gioskos (OL, Ottawa Gee-Gees)
1991	Mike Pavelec (OL, Calgary Dinos)	Paul Vajda (OL, Concordia Stingers)
1992	Jason Rauhaus (DE, Manitoba Bisons)	Chris Morris (OL, Toronto Varsity Blues)
1993	Chris Konrad (DE, Calgary Dinos)	Mike O'Shea (LB, Guelph Gryphons)
1994	Travis Serke (OT, Saskatchewan Huskies)	Val St. Germain (OG, McGill Redmen)
1995	Rohn Meyer (OG, Calgary Dinos)	Matthieu Quiviger (OT, McGill Redmen)
1996	Don Blair (WR, Calgary Dinos)	Harry Van Hofwegen (DT, Carleton Ravens)
1997	Ben Fairbrother (OL, Calgary Dinos)	Mark Farraway (DL, St. Francis Xavier X-Men)
1998	Bob Beveridge (OL, UBC Thunderbirds)	Dave Miller-Johnston (P/K, Concordia Stingers)
1999	Scott Flory (OT, Saskatchewan Huskies)	Cameron Legault (DT, Carleton Ravens)
2000	Kevin Lefsrud (OT, Saskatchewan Huskies)	Kojo Millington (DE, Wilfrid Laurier Golden Hawks)
2001	Carlo Panaro (OL, Alberta Golden Bears)	Randy Chevrier (DL, McGill Redmen)
2002	Jason Clermont (IR, Regina Rams)	Kojo Aidoo (RB, McMaster Marauders)
2003	Israel Idonije (DT, Manitoba Bisons)	Adam MacDonald (LB, St. Francis Xavier X-Men)
2004	Ibrahim Khan (OL, Simon Fraser Clan football)	Carl Gourgues (OL, Laval Rouge et Or)
2005	Nick Johansson (DT, UBC Thunderbirds)	Jesse Lumsden (RB, McMaster Marauders)
2006	Daniel Federkeil (DE, Calgary Dinos)	Andy Fantuz (WR, Western Mustangs)
2007	Jordan Rempel (OL, Saskatchewan Huskies)	Chris Best (OL, Waterloo Warriors)
2008	Dylan Barker (S, Saskatchewan Huskies); Brendon LaBatte (OG, Regina Rams)	Samuel Giguère (WR, Sherbrooke Vert et Or); Eric Maranda (LB, Laval Rouge et Or)
2009	Simeon Rottier (OT, Alberta Golden Bears)	Etienne Légaré (DT, Laval Rouge et Or)
2010	Jordan Sisco (WR/SB, Regina Rams)	Matt Morencie (C, Windsor Lancers)
2011	Anthony Parker (SB, Calgary Dinos)	Matt O'Donnell (OT, Queen's Gaels)
2012	Ben Heenan (OT, Saskatchewan Huskies); Akiem Hicks (DE, Regina Rams)	Arnaud Gascon-Nadon (DE, Laval Rouge et Or)
2013	Kirby Fabien (OL, Calgary Dinos)	Matt Sewell (OT, McMaster Marauders)
2014	Evan Gill (DL, Manitoba Bisons)	Laurent Duvernay-Tardif (OT, McGill Redmen)
2015	Addison Richards (WR, Regina Rams)	Daryl Waud (DL, Western Mustangs)
2016	David Onyemata (DE, Manitoba Bisons)	Sean McEwen, (OL, Calgary Dinos); Charles Vaillancourt (OL, Laval Rouge et Or)
2017	Geoff Gray (OG, Manitoba Bisons)	Antony Auclair (TE, Laval Rouge et Or)
2018	Mark Korte (OL, Alberta Golden Bears)	Regis Cibasu (WR, Montreal Carabins)
2019	Joel Van Pelt (DT, Calgary Dinos)	Mathieu Betts (DE, Laval Rouge et Or)
2020	Carter O'Donnell (OT, Alberta Golden Bears); Marc-Antoine Dequoy (S, Montreal Carabins)	(none)
2022	Deionte Knight (DL, Western Mustangs)	(none)
2023	Theo Benedet (OL, UBC Thunderbirds)	(none)
2024	Qwan'tez Stiggers (CB, Toronto Argonauts (CFL)	(none)

For the 2025 game, quarterback Kurtis Rourke was invited; a native of Ontario and a player for the Indiana Hoosiers, he was unable to participate due to injury. For the 2026 game, offensive lineman Logan Taylor, a native of Nova Scotia and a player for the Boston College Eagles, was invited.

== Hall of Fame ==
A hall of fame was established in 2002, with additional inductees typically named in the weeks leading up to each annual playing. Through the January 2026 edition, 67 players have been named to the hall of fame.

Year	Qty	Inductees (Game no. played in)
2002	6	Dick Butkus (No. 40), Gerald Ford (No. 10), Eddie LeBaron (No. 25), Ollie Matson (No. 27), Volney Peters (No. 26), Dick Stanfel (No. 26)
2003	6	Hugh McElhenny (No. 28), Craig Morton (No. 40), Merlin Olsen (No. 37), Alan Page (No. 42), Leslie Richter (No. 27), Gene Washington (No. 44)
2004	5	Chris Burford (No. 35), Mike Garrett (No. 41), Gino Marchetti (No. 27), Tom Matte (No. 36), Ed White (No. 44)
2005	1	Pat Tillman (No. 73)
2006	4	Raymond Berry (No. 30), Joe Greene (No. 44), Mike Haynes (No. 51), Bob Lilly (No. 36)
2007	4	Joe DeLamielleure (No. 48), Gale Sayers (No. 40), Paul Warfield (No. 39), Randy White (No. 50)
2008	6	Dave Butz (No. 48), Carl Eller (No. 39), Forrest Gregg (No. 31), E.J. Holub (No. 36), Lenny Moore (No. 31), Larry Wilson (No. 35)
2009	4	Jerry Kramer (No. 33), Charley Taylor (No. 39), Brad Van Pelt (No. 48), Doug Williams (No. 53)
2010	4	Larry Csonka (No. 43), James Groh (No. 21), (Note: James Groh played in the January 1946 edition of the game following his collegiate career as a guard with Colgate; he declined to pursue a professional career and became an orthopedic surgeon. Groh died in 2015 at the age of 90.) Jim Walden (No. 35), Kellen Winslow (No. 54)
2011	2	Buck Belue (No. 57), Tom Flick (No. 56)
2012	2	Martín Gramática (No. 74), Joey Harrington (No. 77)
2013	2	Buddy Curry (No. 55), Steve Bartkowski (No. 50)
2014	2	Tony Berti (No. 70), Steve Atwater (No. 64)
2015	2	Tommie Frazier (No. 71), Jim Hanifan (No. 30)
2016	2	Rickey Jackson (No. 56), Chris Chandler (No. 63)
2017	2	Robert Porcher (No. 67), Mark Rypien (No. 61)
2018	3	Brett Favre (No. 66), Willie Roaf (No. 68), Gary Huff (No. 48)
2019	2	Troy Vincent (No. 67), Barry Smith (No. 48)
2020	2	Will Shields (No. 68), Dan Pastorini (No. 46)
2023	1	Nate Burleson (No. 78)
2024	2	Steve Sarkisian (No. 72), Steve Smith Sr. (No. 76)
2025	2	Eddie George (No. 71), Andrew Whitworth (No. 81)
2026	1	Daryl "Moose" Johnston (No. 64)

Inductees range from having played in game No. 10 (January 1935) to game No. 81 (January 2006), with game No. 48 (December 1972) having the most players honored, five.

== Pat Tillman Award ==
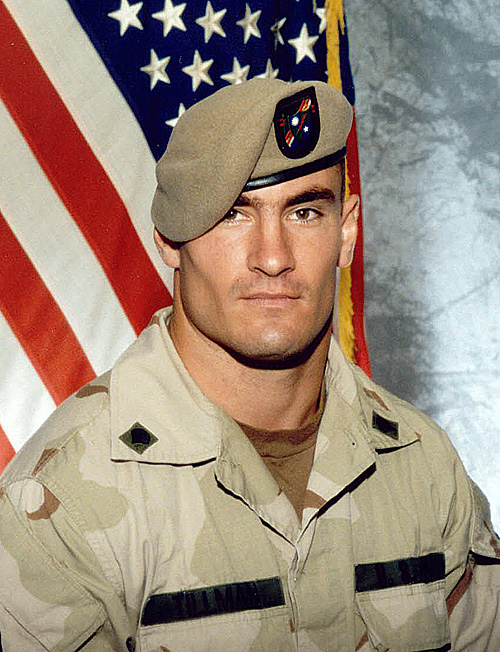
Pat Tillman

Game organizers initiated a Pat Tillman Award in 2005, the year that Tillman was posthumously inducted to the game's hall of fame, to recognize "a player who best exemplifies character, intelligence, sportsmanship and service."

List of Pat Tillman Award winners
Year	Player	Pos.	College
2005	Morgan Scalley	S	Utah
2006	Charlie Peprah	S	Alabama
2007	Kyle Shotwell	LB	Cal Poly
2008	Justin Tryon	CB	Arizona State
2009	Collin Mooney	FB	Army
2010	Mike McLaughlin	LB	Boston College
2011	Josh McNary	LB	Army
2012	Tauren Poole	RB	Tennessee
2013	Keith Pough	LB	Howard
2014	Gabe Ikard	C	Oklahoma
2015	Jake Ryan	LB	Michigan
2016	Keenan Reynolds	QB	Navy
2017	Weston Steelhammer	S	Air Force
2018	J. T. Barrett	QB	Ohio State
2019	Cody Barton	LB	Utah
2020	James Morgan	QB	FIU
2022	Jack Coan	QB	Notre Dame
2023	Derek Parish	DE	Houston
2024	Trey Taylor	S	Air Force
2025	Jordan Phillips	DT	Maryland
2026	Febechi Nwaiwu	OG	Oklahoma

== All-Century Team ==
In celebration of its 100th anniversary, the East–West Shrine Bowl announced its All-Century Team. Listed in alphabetical order:

B — Herb Adderley, Michigan State
OT/G — Larry Allen, Sonoma State
DL — Jared Allen, Idaho State
DB — Steve Atwater, Arkansas
E — Raymond Berry, SMU
QB — Tom Brady, Michigan
LB — Robert Brazile, Jackson State
OLB — Willie Brown, Temple (Note: Willie Brown from the Temple Owls—not to be confused with the like-named player from Grambling or the like-named player from USC— blocked a punt and recovered the ball at the four-yard line for the East squad in the January 1996 game. Brown and Tommie Frazier were named MVPs of the game. Brown later played in the CFL in 1998 with the BC Lions.)
DE — Tedy Bruschi, Arizona
DL — Nick Buoniconti, Notre Dame
C — Dick Butkus, Illinois
DB — Kam Chancellor, Virginia Tech
Q — Earl "Dutch" Clark, Colorado College
T — George Connor, Notre Dame
B — Larry Csonka, Syracuse
DT — Curley Culp, Arizona State
QB — Randall Cunningham, UNLV
LB — Fred Dean, Louisiana Tech
OT — Joe DeLamielleure, Michigan State
T — Dan Dierdorf, Michigan
E — Mike Ditka, Pittsburgh
DL — Chris Doleman, Pittsburgh
B — Bill Dudley, Virginia
Q — Tony Dungy, Minnesota
T — Albert Glen "Turk" Edwards, Washington State
T — Carl Eller, Minnesota
Q — John Elway, Stanford
OB — Brett Favre, Southern Mississippi
E — Tom Fears, UCLA
B — Jim Finks, Tulsa
G — Dan Fortmann, Colgate
RB — Eddie George, Ohio State
B — Frank Gifford, UCLA
DT — La’Roi Glover, San Diego State
DT — Joe Greene, North Texas
T — Forrest Gregg, SMU
OL — Russ Grimm, Pittsburgh
B — John Hadl, Kansas
LB — Jack Ham, Penn State
DB — Mike Haynes, Arizona State
E — Bill Hewitt, Michigan
B — Clarke Hinkle, Bucknell
B — Paul Hornung, Notre Dame
LB — Rickey Jackson, Pittsburgh
H — Jimmy Johnson, Santa Clara (Note: James L. Johnson from the Santa Clara Broncos played in the January 1941 edition of the game and was selected by the Chicago Bears in the 1941 NFL draft. He died in an airplane crash in Germany in May 1945 while serving in the U.S. Ninth Army. Johnson was inducted to the Broncos' athletic hall of fame in 1975.)
G — Jerry Kramer, Idaho
B — Paul Krause, Iowa
T — Bob Lilly, TCU
G — Tom Mack, Michigan
E — John Mackey, Syracuse
OL — Logan Mankins, Fresno State
G — Gino Marchetti, USF
B — Ollie Matson, USF
B — George McAfee, Duke
T — Mike McCormack, Kansas
OL — Randall McDaniel, Arizona State
B — Hugh McElhenny, Washington
WR — Art Monk, Syracuse
B — Lenny Moore, Penn State
T — Bronko Nagurski, Minnesota
FB — Lorenzo Neal, Fresno State
T — Merlin Olsen, Utah State
DE — Alan Page, Notre Dame
H — Ace Parker, Duke
G — Jim Parker, Ohio State
RB — Walter Payton, Jackson State
E — Pete Pihos, Indiana
G — Les Richter, UC Berkeley
WR — Andre Rison, Michigan State
OT — Willie Roaf, Louisiana Tech
OC — Jeff Saturday, North Carolina
B — Gale Sayers, Kansas
WR — Sterling Sharpe, South Carolina
WR — Shannon Sharpe, Savannah State
OG — Will Shields, Nebraska
WR — Steve Smith, Utah
G — Dick Stanfel, San Francisco
B — Roger Staubach, Navy
TE — Ernie Stautner, Boston College
C — Dwight Stephenson, Alabama
T — Joe Stydahar, West Virginia
B — Charley Taylor, Arizona State
LB — Lawrence Taylor, North Carolina
MLB — Zach Thomas, Texas Tech
OLB — Pat Tillman, Arizona State
C — Clyde "Bulldog" Turner, Hardin–Simmons
CB/DB — Troy Vincent, Wisconsin
DE — Mike Vrabel, Ohio State
B — Doak Walker, SMU
B — Paul Warfield, Ohio State

— Bob Waterfield, UCLA 

C — Mike Webster, Wisconsin
T — Arnie Weinmeister, Washington
WR — Wes Welker, Texas Tech
DT — Randy White, Maryland
OL — Andrew Whitworth, LSU
Q — Doug Williams, Grambling State
B — Larry Wilson, Utah
TE — Kellen Winslow, Missouri
C — Alex Wojciechowicz, Fordham
