= 2006 East–West Shrine Game =

- presented by AT&T; All–Star Bowl Game
West Team	East Team
35	31
Head coach: Dennis Franchione (Texas A&M)	Head coach: Houston Nutt (Arkansas)
	1	2	3	4	Total
West	7	14	0	14	35
East	7	7	10	7	31
- Date: January 21, 2006
- Season: 2005
- Stadium: Alamodome
- Location: San Antonio, Texas
- MVP: Reggie McNeal (QB, Texas A&M) & James Wyche (DE, Syracuse)
- Referee: Terry Brown
- Attendance: 18,533

United States TV coverage
- Network: ESPN2

The 2006 East–West Shrine Game was the 81st staging of the all-star college football exhibition game featuring NCAA Division I Football Bowl Subdivision players. The game featured over 80 players from the 2005 college football season, and prospects for the 2006 draft of the professional National Football League (NFL). In the week prior to the game, scouts from all 32 NFL teams attended. The proceeds from the East–West Shrine Game benefit Shriners Hospitals for Children. For sponsorship purposes, the game was officially the East–West Shrine Game presented by AT&T.

The game was played on January 21, 2006, at 3 p.m. CT at the Alamodome in San Antonio, and was televised by ESPN2. Other than the 1942 game, which was played in New Orleans, this was the first time that the Shrine Game was played outside of California.

The offensive MVP was Reggie McNeal (QB, Texas A&M), while the defensive MVP was James Wyche (DE, Syracuse). The Pat Tillman Award was presented to Charlie Peprah (S, Alabama); the award "is presented to a player who best exemplifies character, intelligence, sportsmanship and service".

== Scoring summary ==
Scoring summary

Quarter	Time	Drive			Team	Scoring information	Score	
Quarter	Time	Plays	Yards	TOP	Team	Scoring information	West	East
1	12:48	4	67	2:12	East	De'Arrius Howard 7-yard touchdown run, Josh Huston kick good	0	7
1	3:54	15	78	8:54	West	Tim Day 1-yard touchdown reception from Reggie McNeal, Jon Scifres kick good	7	7
2	13:35	6	80	3:06	West	Taurean Henderson 2-yard touchdown run, Jon Scifres kick good	14	7
2	9:06	8	82	2:57	West	David Thomas 20-yard touchdown reception from Drew Olson, Jon Scifres kick good	21	7
2	5:13	8	71	3:53	East	Marques Colston 11-yard touchdown reception from Bruce Gradkowski, Josh Huston kick good	21	14
3	12:49	4	30	1:53	East	De'Arrias Howard 3-yard touchdown run, Josh Huston kick good	21	21
3	2:18	11	36	5:49	East	47-yard field goal by Josh Huston	21	24
4	8:13	11	44	5:23	East	De'Arrias Howard 11-yard touchdown run, Josh Huston kick good	21	31
4	6:55	3	72	1:17	West	DonTrell Moore 5-yard touchdown run, Jon Scifres kick good	28	31
4	2:00	2	69	0:24	West	Mike Hass 23-yard touchdown reception from Reggie McNeal, Jon Scifres kick good	35	31
"TOP" = time of possession. For other American football terms, see Glossary of American football.							35	31

=== Statistics ===
Statistics	West	East
First downs	19	19
Rushes-yards	27-90	31-124
Passing yards	328	288
Passes, Comp-Att-Int	17-28-1	19-38-0
Return yards	9	20
Punts-average	2-38.0	4-42.8
Fumbles-lost	1-1	0-0
Penalties-yards	3-25	11-110
Time of Possession	26:43	33:17
Attendance	18,533	

== Coaching staff ==
East head coach: Houston Nutt
East assistants: Reggie Herring & Mike Markuson
West head coach: Dennis Franchione
West assistants: Brad Franchione & Les Koenning

== Rosters ==
Source:
