= 2023 East–West Shrine Bowl =

- All–Star Bowl Game
East Team	West Team
3	12
Head coach: Marquice Williams; Atlanta Falcons	Head coach: Troy Brown; New England Patriots
	1	2	3	4	Total
East	0	3	0	0	3
West	3	0	3	6	12
- Date: February 2, 2023
- Season: 2022
- Stadium: Allegiant Stadium
- Location: Paradise, Nevada
- MVP: Offense: Jake Moody (K, Michigan); Defense: Trey Dean (S, Florida)
- National anthem: Kechi Okwuchi
- Referee: Marcus Woods (ACC)
- Attendance: 12,371

United States TV coverage
- Network: NFL Network

The 2023 East–West Shrine Bowl was the 98th edition of the all–star college football exhibition to benefit Shriners Hospital for Children. The game was played at Allegiant Stadium in Paradise, Nevada, on February 2, 2023, starting at 5:30 p.m. PST and televised on the NFL Network. It was one of the final 2022–23 bowl games concluding the 2022 FBS football season. The game featured NCAA players (predominantly from the Football Bowl Subdivision) and one invitee from Canadian university football—Theo Benedet, an offensive lineman from the UBC Thunderbirds.

== Coaches ==
Organizers, in cooperation with the National Football League (NFL), announced that coaching staffs for the game would be provided by the Atlanta Falcons and New England Patriots.

Role	East Atlanta Falcons	West New England Patriots
Head coach	Marquice Williams	Troy Brown
Offensive coordinator	Justin Peelle	Ross Douglas
Defensive coordinator	Frank Bush	Mike Pellegrino; Brian Belichick

Note: additional members of the coaching staffs are not listed here

== Game summary ==
2023 East–West Shrine Bowl

Quarter	1	2	3	4	Total
East	0	3	0	0	3
West	3	0	3	6	12

at Allegiant Stadium • Paradise, Nevada

- Date: Thursday, February 2, 2023
- Game time: 8:30 p.m. EST
- Game attendance: 12,371
- Referee: Marcus Woods
- TV: NFL Network
- Box score Report

Game information

First quarter

- West (0:33) – Jake Moody 51-yard field goal West 3–0

Second quarter

- East (3:30) – Andre Szmyt 30-yard field goal Tied 3–3

Third quarter

- West (11:06) – Jake Moody 51-yard field goal West 6–3

Fourth quarter

- West (7:05) – Jake Moody 35-yard field goal West 9–3
- West (1:16) – Jake Moody 35-yard field goal West 12–3
