= 2009 East–West Shrine Game =

- All–Star Bowl Game
East Team	West Team
24	19
Head coach: Bobby Ross	Head coach: Gene Stallings
	1	2	3	4	Total
East Team	0	17	7	0	24
West Team	0	6	7	6	19
- Date: January 17, 2009
- Season: 2008
- Stadium: Robertson Stadium
- Location: Houston
- MVP: Marlon Lucky (RB, Nebraska) & Michael Tauiliili (LB, Duke)
- Referee: Mike DeFee
- Attendance: 15,387

United States TV coverage
- Network: ESPN2

The 2009 East–West Shrine Game was the 84th staging of the all-star college football exhibition game featuring NCAA Division I Football Bowl Subdivision players. The game featured over 100 players from the 2008 college football season, and prospects for the 2009 draft of the professional National Football League (NFL). In the week prior to the game, scouts from all 32 NFL teams attended. The proceeds from the East–West Shrine Game benefit Shriners Hospitals for Children.

The game was played on January 17, 2009, at 3 p.m. CT at Robertson Stadium on the campus of the University of Houston, and was televised by ESPN2. The game was won by the East team, 24–19.

The offensive MVP was Marlon Lucky (RB, Nebraska), while the defensive MVP was Michael Tauiliili (LB, Duke). The Pat Tillman Award was presented to Collin Mooney (FB, Army); the award "is presented to a player who best exemplifies character, intelligence, sportsmanship and service".

== Scoring summary ==
Scoring summary

Quarter	Time	Drive			Team	Scoring information	Score	
Quarter	Time	Plays	Yards	TOP	Team	Scoring information	East	West
2	12:55	9	62	5:09	East	Marlon Lucky 7-yard touchdown run, Graham Gano kick good	7	0
2	7:52	11	42	4:57	West	49-yard field goal by David Buehler	7	3
2	6:48	3	72	1:00	East	Javarris Williams 3-yard touchdown run, Graham Gano kick good	14	3
2	2:42	6	12	2:34	East	24-yard field goal by Graham Gano	17	3
2	0:00	7	50	0:49	West	21-yard field goal by David Buehler	17	6
3	8:11	11	85	5:04	West	Mike Thomas 22-yard touchdown reception from Tom Brandstater, David Buehler kick good	17	13
3	0:16	6	62	2:23	East	Tyrell Sutton 2-yard touchdown run, Graham Gano kick good	24	13
4	14:07	3	74	1:04	West	Jarett Dillard 35-yard touchdown reception from Stephen McGee, 2-point pass incomplete	24	19
"TOP" = time of possession. For other American football terms, see Glossary of American football.							24	19

=== Statistics ===
Statistics	East	West
First downs	12	23
Rushes-yards	32-174	36-117
Passing yards	83	317
Passes, Comp-Att-Int	6-15-0	22-42-1
Return yards	28	49
Punts-average	6-47.3	4-32.8
Fumbles-lost	0-0	0-0
Penalties-yards	5-55	5-48
Time of Possession	22:42	37:18
Attendance	15,387	

== Coaching staff ==
East head coach: Bobby Ross
West head coach: Gene Stallings

== Rosters ==
Source:
