= Jennifer King (American football) =

American sports coach (born 1984)

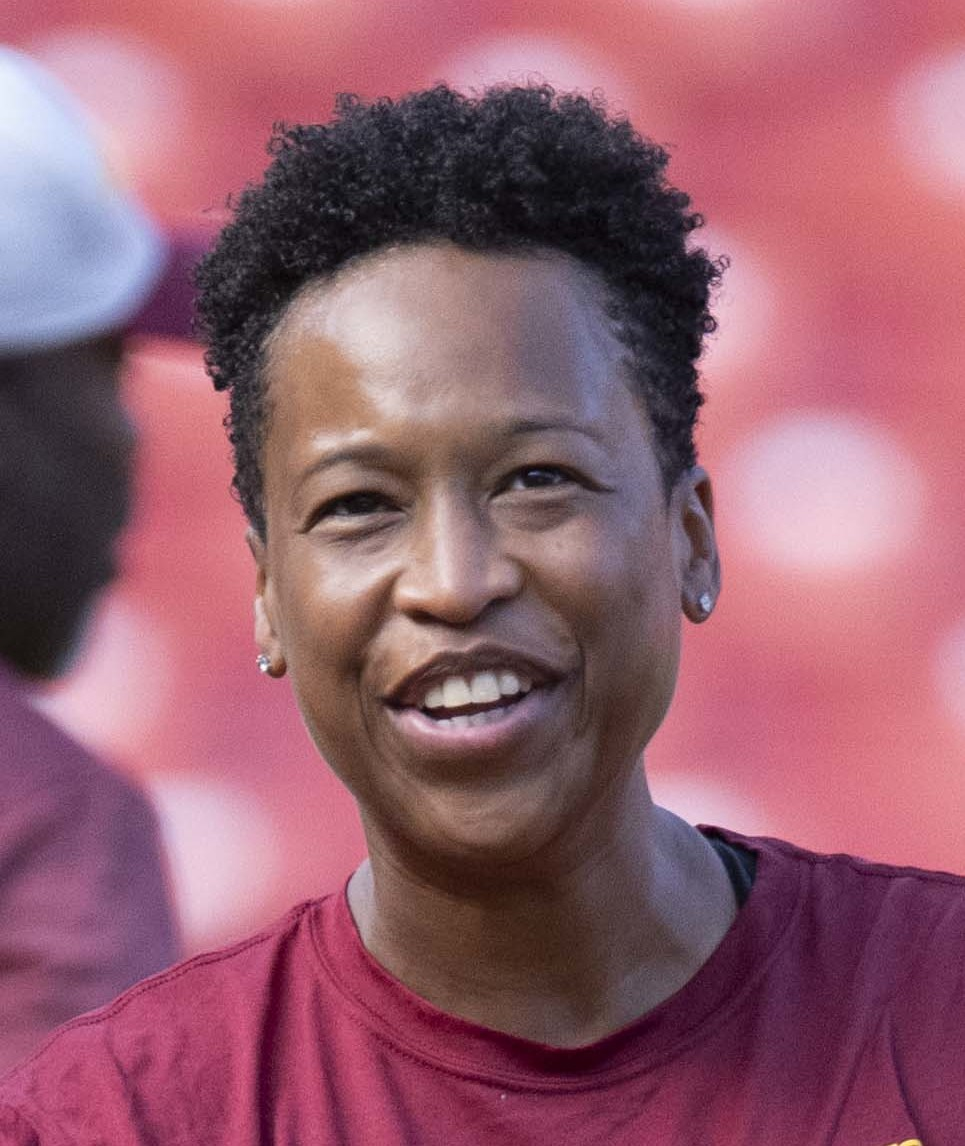
- King in 2021

North Carolina Central Eagles
- Title: Offensive analyst

Personal information
- Born: August 6, 1984 (age 42); Eden, North Carolina, U.S.

Career information
- High school: Rockingham County (Wentworth, North Carolina)
- College: Guilford (2002–2006); Liberty University (2014–2016)

Career history

Playing
- Carolina Phoenix (2007–2017); New York Sharks (2018); D.C. Divas (2019)

Coaching
- Carolina Panthers (2018) Wide receivers coach intern; Arizona Hotshots (2018–2019) Assistant wide receivers and special teams coach; Carolina Panthers (2019) Running backs coach intern; Dartmouth (2019) Offensive assistant; Washington Football Team (2020) Coaching intern; Washington Football Team / Commanders (2021–2023) Assistant running backs coach; Chicago Bears (2024) Offensive assistant/running backs; NC Central (2025–present) Offensive analyst

Awards and highlights
- Women's Football Alliance Division II champion (2018)

Jennifer King (born August 6, 1984) is an American football coach who is currently an offensive analyst for the North Carolina Central Eagles. A former two-sport athlete at Guilford College, she was the first black woman to be an assistant coach in the National Football League (NFL), coaching for the Carolina Panthers, Washington Commanders, and Chicago Bears. King also coached women's college basketball and played for the Carolina Phoenix, New York Sharks, and D.C. Divas of the Women's Football Alliance (WFA).

== Early life and college ==
King was born August 6, 1984, in Eden, North Carolina, and was raised in Reidsville, North Carolina. She attended Guilford College, where she played college basketball and softball, before graduating with a degree in sports management in 2006. She played in the Women's Football Alliance (WFA) as a quarterback and wide receiver for the Carolina Phoenix from 2006 to 2017, a defensive back and wide receiver for the New York Sharks in 2018, and safety for the D.C. Divas in 2019. She was a part of the Sharks team that won the 2018 WFA Division II Championship. She later attended Liberty University in the mid-2010s and graduated with a Master of Science degree in sports management.

== Coaching career ==
=== Basketball ===
Jennifer King
Playing career

Basketball
- 2002–2006: Guilford

Softball
- 2002–2006: Guilford

Coaching career (HC unless noted)
- 2006–2016: Greensboro (assistant)
- 2016–2018: Johnson & Wales

Head coaching record
- Overall: 37–10 (.787) (college)
- Tournaments: 3–0 (USCAA Division II)

Accomplishments and honors

Championships
- 1 USCAA National (2018)

Awards
- USCAA Women's Division II Coach of the Year (2018)

King was an assistant coach at Greensboro College from 2006 to 2016, where the program compiled a 182–63 record, 5 regular season championships, 2 conference tournament championships, and four NCAA tournament appearances. She was hired as the women's basketball head coach at Johnson & Wales University in North Carolina, where she turned around a program that had existed for only two years prior into a national champion within two seasons.

Record table
Season	Team	Overall	Conference	Standing	Postseason
Johnson & Wales Wildcats (Eastern Metro Athletic Conference) (2016–2018)
2016–17	Johnson & Wales	15–6	2–0		
2017–18	Johnson & Wales	22–4			USCAA Division II National Champion
Johnson & Wales:		37–10 (.787)	2–0 (1.000)		
Total:		37–10 (.787)			
National champion Postseason invitational champion Conference regular season champion Conference regular season and conference tournament champion Division regular season champion Division regular season and conference tournament champion Conference tournament champion

=== American football ===
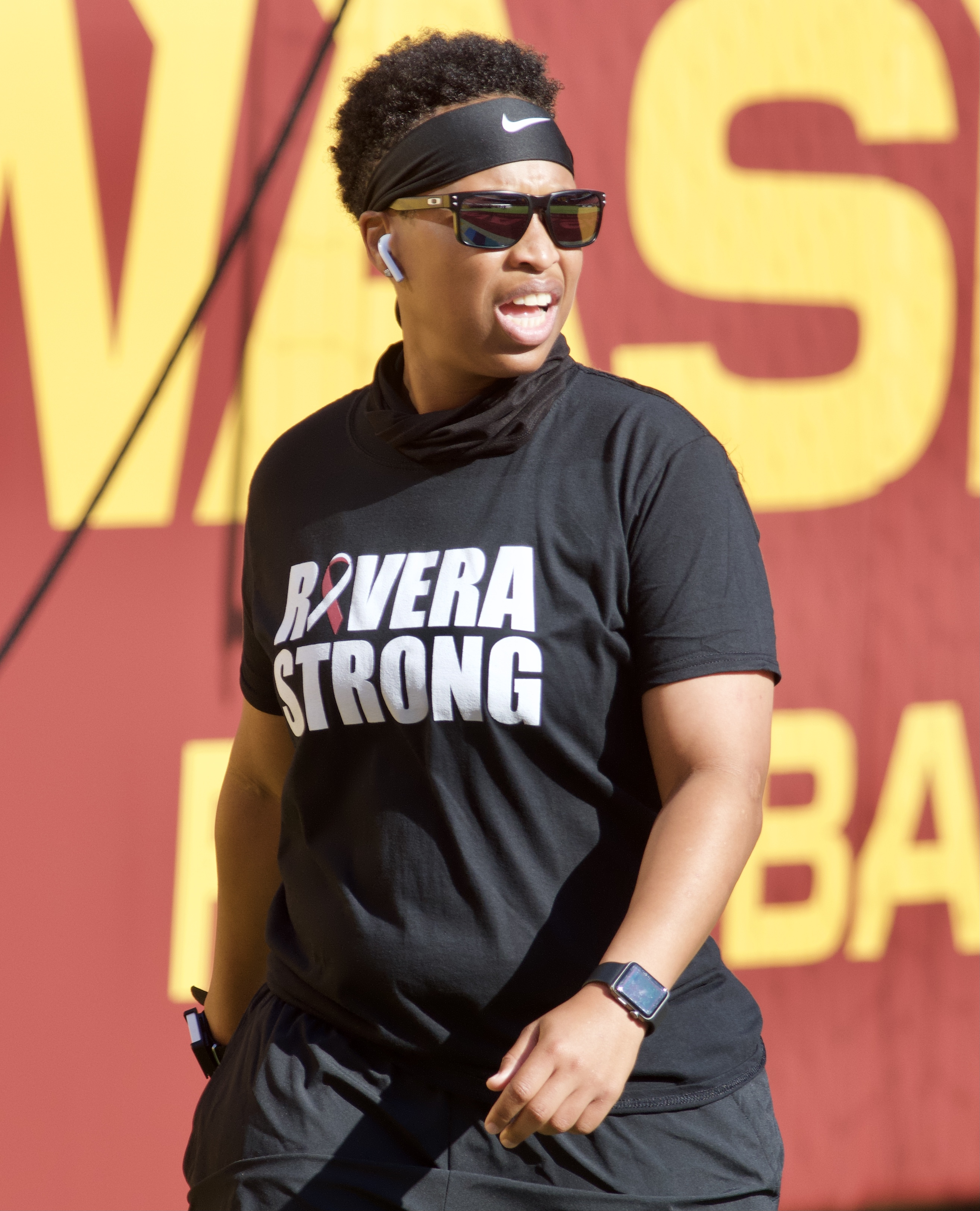
King with the Washington Football Team in 2020

King was one of 40 women to attend the NFL's Women's Forum in 2018, where she met then-Carolina Panthers head coach Ron Rivera and expressed her interest in working within the NFL. She was hired as an intern by the Panthers later that year, where she assisted in coaching their wide receivers. She got her first full-time coaching gig in 2018 as an assistant wide receivers and special teams coach for the Arizona Hotshots of the Alliance of American Football (AAF). After the AAF folded in 2019, King was once again brought on as an intern for the Panthers, this time working with the running backs.

King was also named an offensive assistant at Dartmouth for the 2019 season. While there, she was awarded one of the three inaugural grants of the Scott Pioli & Family Fund for Women Football Coaches & Scouts, given to female football coaches and scouts to provide financial assistance. She interned once more as a coach with the Washington Football Team in 2020, working once again under Rivera who joined Washington that season. She was promoted to assistant running backs coach the following year, making her the first black woman to become a full-time coach in NFL history. King served as the running backs coach for the West team in the 2022 East–West Shrine Bowl. She was hired by the Chicago Bears as an offensive assistant in 2024, focusing on running backs. King was not retained in 2025.

In 2025, King was hired by North Carolina Central as an offensive analyst, specifically working with the team’s wide receivers.

== Personal life ==
King has also worked as a flight attendant for Delta Air Lines and as a police officer in High Point, North Carolina.
