= 2005 East–West Shrine Game =

- All–Star Bowl Game
East Team	West Team
45	27
Head coach: Joe Tiller (Purdue)	Head coach: Mike Riley (Oregon State)
	1	2	3	4	Total
East	14	21	10	0	45
West	13	0	7	7	27
- Date: January 15, 2005
- Season: 2004
- Stadium: SBC Park
- Location: San Francisco, California
- MVP: Stefan LeFors (QB, Louisville) & Alex Green (S, Duke)
- Favorite: East by 3
- Referee: Dave Cutaia
- Halftime show: Santa Cruz High School Marching Band
- Attendance: 25,518

United States TV coverage
- Network: ESPN

The 2005 East–West Shrine Game was the 80th staging of the all-star college football exhibition game featuring NCAA Division I Football Bowl Subdivision players. The game featured over 80 players from the 2004 college football season, and prospects for the 2005 draft of the professional National Football League (NFL). In the week prior to the game, scouts from all 32 NFL teams attended. The proceeds from the East–West Shrine Game benefit Shriners Hospitals for Children.

The game was played on January 15, 2005, at 11 a.m. PT at SBC Park in San Francisco, and was televised by ESPN. This was the last Shrine Game played in California.

The offensive MVP was Stefan LeFors (QB, Louisville), while the defensive MVP was Alex Green (S, Duke). The inaugural Pat Tillman Award was presented to Morgan Scalley (S, Utah); the award "is presented to a player who best exemplifies character, intelligence, sportsmanship and service".

== Scoring summary ==
Scoring summary

Quarter	Time	Drive			Team	Scoring information	Score	
Quarter	Time	Plays	Yards	TOP	Team	Scoring information	East	West
1	10:59	9	89	4:01	East	Ryan Moats 1-yard touchdown run, Dave Rayner kick good	7	0
1	8:19	8	79	2:40	West	Paris Warren 1-yard touchdown reception from Derek Anderson, Matt Payne kick failed	7	6
1	5:35	4	51	1:28	West	Brandon Jacobs 5-yard touchdown run, Matt Payne kick good	7	13
1	1:49	6	99	1:26	East	Taylor Stubblefield 23-yard touchdown reception from Kyle Orton, Dave Rayner kick good	14	13
2	12:42	8	72	3:04	East	Taylor Stubblefield 7-yard touchdown reception from Stefan LeFors, Dave Rayner kick good	21	13
2	5:43	8	67	3:36	East	J. R. Russell 36-yard touchdown reception from Stefan LeFors, Dave Rayner kick good	28	13
2	0:30	2	38	0:45	East	J. R. Russell 37-yard touchdown reception from Stefan LeFors, Dave Rayner kick good	35	13
3	7:29	10	76	5:06	East	29-yard field goal by Dave Rayner	38	13
3	6:08	1	29	0:19	East	Chauncey Stovall 29-yard touchdown run, Dave Rayner kick good	45	13
3	4:52	3	67	1:16	West	Brandon Jacobs 52-yard touchdown run, Matt Payne kick good	45	20
4	6:04	6	82	3:53	West	Chad Owens 52-yard touchdown reception from Dustin Long, Matt Payne kick good	45	27
"TOP" = time of possession. For other American football terms, see Glossary of American football.							45	27

=== Statistics ===
Statistics	East	West
First downs	22	20
Rushes-yards	34-176	26-159
Passing yards	377	301
Passes, Comp-Att-Int	19-33-0	21-53-2
Return yards	3	33
Punts-average	4-37.2	3-43.3
Fumbles-lost	0-0	1-1
Penalties-yards	8-79	4-35
Time of Possession	28:59	31:01
Attendance	25,518	

== Coaching staff ==
East head coach: Joe Tiller (Tiller was a player in the 1963 game)
East assistants: Jim Chaney & Brock Spack
West head coach: Mike Riley
West assistants: Mark Banker & Paul Chryst

== Rosters ==
Source:
