= 2019 East–West Shrine Game =

- All–Star Bowl Game
East Team	West Team
17	21
Head coach: Sam Mills III (Carolina Panthers)	Head coach: Adam Zimmer (Minnesota Vikings)
	1	2	3	4	Total
East	0	0	14	3	17
West	7	7	7	0	21
- Date: January 19, 2019
- Season: 2018
- Stadium: Tropicana Field
- Location: St. Petersburg, Florida
- MVP: Terry Godwin (WR, Georgia) & Justin Hollins (LB, Oregon)
- Favorite: East by 3
- Referee: Jeff Heaser
- Attendance: 19,654

United States TV coverage
- Network: NFL Network & SB Nation Radio

The 2019 East–West Shrine Game was the 94th staging of the all–star college football exhibition to benefit Shriners Hospital for Children. The game was played at Tropicana Field in St. Petersburg, Florida, on January 19, 2019, with a 3:00 p.m. EST kickoff, televised on the NFL Network. It was one of the final 2018–19 bowl games concluding the 2018 FBS football season. The game featured NCAA players (predominantly from the Football Bowl Subdivision) and a few select invitees from Canadian university football, rostered into "East" and "West" teams.

The game featured more than 100 players from the 2018 NCAA Division I FBS football season and prospects for the 2019 draft of the professional National Football League (NFL). In the week prior to the game, scouts from all 32 NFL teams attended team practices. Coaches and game officials were supplied by the NFL.

The day before the game, the East–West Shrine Game Pat Tillman Award was given to Cody Barton (LB, Utah); the award "is presented to a player who best exemplifies character, intelligence, sportsmanship and service. The award is about a student-athlete's achievements and conduct, both on and off the field."

== Coaching staffs ==
In early January 2019, head coaches were announced; Sam Mills III, defensive line coach for the Carolina Panthers, and Adam Zimmer, linebackers coach for the Minnesota Vikings, for the East and West teams, respectively. Each head coach had a support staff of 13 coaches.

== Players ==
Players who accepted invitations to the game are listed on the official website; selected players are listed below.

=== East team ===
Full roster online here.

No.	Pos.	Player	College	2018 season bowl game	Notes
99	DE	Mathieu Betts	Laval	Vanier Cup (Canada)	1 solo tackle
11	QB	David Blough	Purdue	Music City Bowl	10–15 passing for 149 yds, 2 TD
18	P	A. J. Cole III	NC State	Gator Bowl	4 punts for 200 yds (avg 50.0, long 60)
14	QB	Taylor Cornelius	Oklahoma State	Liberty Bowl	4–7 passing for 28 yds, 2 INT
90	DT	Michael Dogbe	Temple	Independence Bowl	2 solo tackles
1	RB	Jordan Ellis	Virginia	Belk Bowl	6 carries for 17 yds
55	OC	Lamont Gaillard	Georgia	Sugar Bowl	
19	K	Matt Gay	Utah	Holiday Bowl	2-for-2 on extra points, 47-yard field goal
45	LB	Ulysees Gilbert III	Akron	none	2 solo tackles, 3 assisted tackles
4	WR	Terry Godwin	Georgia	Sugar Bowl	2 TD receptions; Offensive MVP
84	WR	Jesper Horsted	Princeton	n/a (FCS)	2 receptions for 42 yds
24	RB	Ty Johnson	Maryland	none	7 carries for 44 yds
10	QB	Jordan Ta'amu	Ole Miss	none	7–10 passing for 98 yds
98	DL	Ricky Walker	Virginia Tech	Military Bowl	
33	RB	Darnell Woolfolk	Army	Armed Forces Bowl	2 carries for 3 yds
8	RB	Marquis Young	UMass	none	10 carries for 54 yds

=== West team ===
Full roster online here.

No.	Pos.	Player	College	2018 season bowl game	Notes
15	K	John Baron II	San Diego State	Frisco Bowl	3-for-3 on extra points
47	TE	Andrew Beck	Texas	Sugar Bowl	2 receptions for 11 yds
18	LB	BJ Blunt	McNeese State	n/a (FCS)	21-yard interception return
5	RB	Nick Brossette	LSU	Fiesta Bowl	5 carries for 19 yds; 22-yard TD reception
76	OG	Juwann Bushell-Beatty	Michigan	Peach Bowl	
46	DL	Landis Durham	Texas A&M	Gator Bowl	1 solo tackle
82	P	Jack Fox	Rice	none	5 punts for 234 yds (avg 46.8, long 57)
24	RB	Darrin Hall	Pittsburgh	Sun Bowl	12 carries for 77 yds
48	LB	Justin Hollins	Oregon	Redbox Bowl	10 combined tackles (3 for loss), 2 sacks; Defensive MVP
43	DE	Markus Jones	Angelo State	n/a (Division II)	3 solo tackles, 3 assisted tackles, 0.5 sacks
32	S	Tyree Kinnel	Michigan	Peach Bowl	3 solo tackles, 1 assisted tackle
95	DL	Daylon Mack	Texas A&M	Gator Bowl	
6	QB	Marcus McMaryion	Fresno State	Las Vegas Bowl	3–11 passing for 27 yds
97	DL	Chris Nelson	Texas	Sugar Bowl	1 assisted tackle
22	RB	Devine Ozigbo	Nebraska	none	4 carries for 14 yds, 1 TD
78	OT	Trey Pipkins	Sioux Falls	n/a (Division II)	
19	WR	Shawn Poindexter	Arizona	none	4 receptions for 71 yds, 1 TD
4	QB	Brett Rypien	Boise State	First Responder Bowl	10–14 passing for 134 yds, 1 TD
12	QB	Easton Stick	North Dakota State	n/a (FCS)	5–8 passing for 51 yds, 1 TD
66	OG	Keaton Sutherland	Texas A&M	Gator Bowl	
3	WR	Ron'quavion Tarver	Utah State	New Mexico Bowl	5 receptions for 66 yds
98	DT	Joel Van Pelt	Calgary	Hardy Cup (Canada)	2 solo tackles, 1 assisted tackle
14	CB	Mazzi Wilkins	South Florida	Gasparilla Bowl	31-yard interception return

== Game summary ==
=== Scoring summary ===
Scoring summary

Quarter	Time	Drive			Team	Scoring information	Score	
Quarter	Time	Plays	Yards	TOP	Team	Scoring information	East	West
1	11:10	8	81	3:50	West	Nick Brossette 22-yard touchdown reception from Brett Rypien, John Baron II kick good	0	7
2	7:05	1	2	0:06	West	Devine Ozigbo 2-yard touchdown run, Baron kick good	0	14
3	9:43	1	22	0:08	West	Shawn Poindexter 22-yard touchdown reception from Easton Stick, Baron kick good	0	21
3	2:52	8	74	3:12	East	Terry Godwin 6-yard touchdown reception from David Blough, Matt Gay kick good	7	21
3	0:05	6	72	1:56	East	Godwin 18-yard touchdown reception from Blough, Gay kick good	14	21
4	4:19	12	60	7:26	East	47-yard field goal by Gay	17	21
"TOP" = time of possession. For other American football terms, see Glossary of American football.							17	21

=== Statistics ===
	1	2	3	4	Total
East	0	0	14	3	17
West	7	7	7	0	21

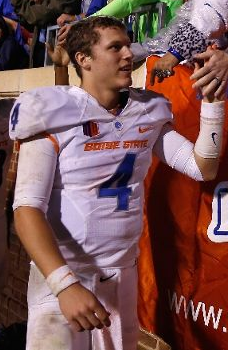
Brett Rypien started at quarterback for the West team.

Statistics	East	West
First downs	16	16
Plays–yards	65–402	59–326
Rushes–yards	33–127	26–114
Passing yards	275	212
Passing: comp–att–int	21–32–2	18–33–0
Turnovers		
Time of possession	33:49	26:11

Team	Category	Player	Statistics
East	Passing	David Blough	10–15, 149 yds, 2 TD
East	Rushing	Marquis Young	10 car, 54 yds
East	Receiving	Terry Godwin	4 rec, 80 yds, 2 TD
West	Passing	Brett Rypien	10–14, 134 yds, 1 TD
West	Rushing	Darrin Hall	12 car, 77 yds
West	Receiving	Shawn Poindexter	4 rec, 71 yds, 1 TD

== See also ==
- 2019 NFL draft
