= 2011 East–West Shrine Game =

2011 Asset Protect East–West Shrine Game
- All–Star Bowl Game
East Team	West Team
25	8
Head coach: Dan Reeves	Head coach: Wade Phillips
	1	2	3	4	Total
East Team	16	3	0	6	25
West Team	0	8	0	0	8
- Date: January 22, 2011
- Season: 2010
- Stadium: Florida Citrus Bowl
- Location: Orlando, Florida
- MVP: Delone Carter (RB, Syracuse) & Martin Parker (DT, Richmond)
- Referee: Tracey Jones
- Attendance: 9,642

United States TV coverage
- Network: NFL Network

The 2011 Asset Protect East–West Shrine Game was the 86th staging of the all-star college football exhibition game featuring NCAA Division I Football Bowl Subdivision players. The game featured over 100 players from the 2010 college football season, and prospects for the 2011 draft of the professional National Football League (NFL). In the week prior to the game, scouts from all 32 NFL teams attended. The proceeds from the East-West Shrine Game benefit Shriners Hospitals for Children.

This oldest all-star game was played on January 22, 2011, at 4 p.m. ET at the Florida Citrus Bowl. The Pat Tillman Award was presented to Josh McNary (LB, Army), who "best exemplifies character, intelligence, sportsmanship and service".

== Game notes ==
=== Scoring summary ===
Scoring Play	Score
1st Quarter
East - Delone Carter 16-yard run (Wes Byrum kick), 14:38	East 7 - 0
East - Team safety, 08:59	East 9 - 0
East - Evan Royster 4-yard run (Wes Byrum kick), 04:23	East 16 - 0
2nd Quarter
East - Wes Byrum 25-yard field goal, 09:24	East 19 - 0
West - Julius Thomas 5-yard pass from Nathan Enderle (Julius Thomas pass from Nathan Enderle), 02:44	East 19 - 8
3rd Quarter
No scoring	East 19 - 8
4th Quarter
East - Marvin Austin 0-yard fumble recovery (Wes Byrum kick blocked), 03:41	East 25 - 8

=== Statistics ===
Statistics	East	West
First downs	17	8
Total offense, plays - yards	65-301	52-126
Rushes-yards (net)	43-169	23-14
Passing yards (net)	132	112
Passes, Comp-Att-Int	11-22-1	14-29-1
Time of Possession	37:25	22:35
