= 2022 East–West Shrine Bowl =

- All–Star Bowl Game
East Team	West Team
24	25
Head coach: D'Anton Lynn; Baltimore Ravens	Head coach: Marcus Brady; Indianapolis Colts
	1	2	3	4	Total
East	0	0	8	16	24
West	8	3	8	6	25
- Date: February 3, 2022
- Season: 2021
- Stadium: Allegiant Stadium
- Location: Paradise, Nevada
- MVP: E. J. Perry (QB, Brown) & Diego Fagot (LB, Navy)
- Referee: Bryan Banks (Big Ten)
- Attendance: 14,679

United States TV coverage
- Network: NFL Network

The 2022 East–West Shrine Bowl was the 97th edition (Note: The 96th edition was canceled due to the COVID-19 pandemic; the most recent playing was the 95th edition, in January 2020.) of the all–star college football exhibition to benefit Shriners Hospital for Children. The game was played at Allegiant Stadium in Paradise, Nevada, on February 3, 2022, at 5:00 p.m. PST, televised on the NFL Network. It was one of the final 2021–22 bowl games concluding the 2021 FBS football season. The game featured NCAA players (predominantly from the Football Bowl Subdivision) and one invitee from Canadian university football—Deionte Knight, a defensive lineman from the Western Mustangs.

== Background ==
The game featured more than 100 players from the 2021 NCAA Division I FBS football season and prospects for the 2022 NFL draft. This was the first edition of the game to be played in the Las Vegas Valley, and the first to be played in February. Organizers announced that, for the first time, team personnel would be assigned by NFL personnel groupings, such as one team playing a 4–3 defense and the other team playing a 3–4 defense.

== Coaching ==
The coaches for the East–West Shrine Bowl were announced on January 22, 2022; coaching staffs were selected from assistant coaches nominated by National Football League (NFL) teams that did not qualify for the NFL postseason.

Role	East	West
Head coach	D'Anton Lynn	Marcus Brady
Offensive coordinator	Travelle Wharton	Klayton Adams
Defensive coordinator	Drew Wilkins	Jeff Howard
Special teams coordinator	Ed Foley	Ben Jacobs
Quarterbacks	Kerry Joseph	Jerrod Johnson
Running backs	Ryan Cordell	Jennifer King
Wide receivers	Alonso Escalante	Ashton Grant
Tight ends	Brad Idzik	Todd Washington
Offensive line	Andrew Dees	Scott Peters
Defensive line	Lanier Goethie	Jeff Zgonina
Linebackers	Zach Orr	Anthony Blevins
Defensive backs	James Rowe	Nick Perry
Strength and conditioning	D'Anthony Batiste	A. J. Neibel
Strength and conditioning	Deuce Gruden	A. J. Neibel
Analysts	Na'Shan Goddard	Kenneth Black
Analysts	Rashad Watson	Trumaine Watson

== Game summary ==
Teams were required to attempt two-point conversions.

2022 East–West Shrine Bowl

Quarter	1	2	3	4	Total
East	0	0	8	16	24
West	8	3	8	6	25

at Allegiant Stadium • Paradise, Nevada

- Date: Thursday, February 3, 2022
- Game time: 5:07 p.m. PST
- Game weather: Sunny • Temperature: 54 °F (12 °C) • Wind 11 mph (18 km/h) northeast
- Game attendance: 14,679
- Referee: Bryan Banks
- TV: NFL Network
- Game Book Report

Game information

First quarter

- West (0:49) – Teagan Quitoriano 1-yard touchdown pass from Jack Coan; 2-point rush good (Jashaun Corbin) West 8–0

Second quarter

- West (1:07) – Caleb Shudak 50-yard field goal West 11–0

Third quarter

- West (7:09) – Jelani Woods 8-yard touchdown pass from Skylar Thompson; 2-point pass good (Thompson to T. Thornton) West 19–0
- East (6:11) – Pierre Strong Jr. 65-yard touchdown pass from EJ Perry; 2-point rush good (EJ Perry) West 19–8

Fourth quarter

- West (12:10) – Jashaun Corbin 4-yard touchdown run; 2-point pass failed West 25–8
- East (3:53) – Samori Toure 6-yard touchdown pass from EJ Perry; 2-point rush good (EJ Perry) West 25–16
- East (1:32) – Samori Toure 17-yard touchdown pass from EJ Perry; 2-point rush good (R. Rivers) West 25–24
