= 2007 East–West Shrine Game =

- All–Star Bowl Game
East Team	West Team
3	21
Head coach: Don Shula	Head coach: Dan Reeves
	1	2	3	4	Total
East Team	0	3	0	0	3
West Team	7	14	0	0	21
- Date: January 20, 2007
- Season: 2006
- Stadium: Reliant Stadium
- Location: Houston
- MVP: Jeff Rowe (QB, Nevada) & Dan Bazuin (DE, Central Michigan)
- Referee: Clete Blackman
- Attendance: 23,554

United States TV coverage
- Network: ESPN2

The 2007 East–West Shrine Game was the 82nd staging of the all-star college football exhibition game featuring NCAA Division I Football Bowl Subdivision players. The game featured over 90 players from the 2006 college football season, and prospects for the 2007 draft of the professional National Football League (NFL). In the week prior to the game, scouts from all 32 NFL teams attended. The proceeds from the East–West Shrine Game benefit Shriners Hospitals for Children.

The game was played on January 20, 2007, at 6 p.m. CT at Reliant Stadium in Houston, and was televised by ESPN2.

The offensive MVP was Jeff Rowe (QB, Nevada), while the defensive MVP was Dan Bazuin (DE, Central Michigan). The Pat Tillman Award was presented to Kyle Shotwell (LB, Cal Poly); the award "is presented to a player who best exemplifies character, intelligence, sportsmanship and service".

== Scoring summary ==
Scoring summary

Quarter	Time	Drive			Team	Scoring information	Score	
Quarter	Time	Plays	Yards	TOP	Team	Scoring information	East	West
1	9:48	10	54	5:12	West	Brad Lau 5-yard touchdown reception from John Beck, Justin Medlock kick good	0	7
2	10:50	10	44	3:49	East	40-yard field goal by Brandon Pace	3	7
2	4:40	7	70	3:55	West	Joel Filani 6-yard touchdown reception from Jeff Rowe, Justin Medlock kick good	3	14
2	1:49	2	86	0:28	West	Paul Williams 79-yard touchdown reception from Jeff Rowe, Justin Medlock kick good	3	21
"TOP" = time of possession. For other American football terms, see Glossary of American football.							3	21

=== Statistics ===
Statistics	East	West
First downs	14	13
Rushes-yards	21-60	30-124
Passing yards	266	134
Passes, Comp-Att-Int	21-43-1	11-21-0
Return yards	43	4
Punts-average	4-42.0	8-42.0
Fumbles-lost	3-1	0-0
Penalties-yards	3-16	4-46
Time of possession	28:35	31:15
Attendance	23,554	

== Coaching staff ==
East head coach: Don Shula
West head coach: Dan Reeves

== Rosters ==
Source:
