= 2008 East–West Shrine Game =

- All–Star Bowl Game
East Team	West Team
13	31
Head coach: Dick Vermeil	Head coach: Mike White
	1	2	3	4	Total
East Team	3	0	0	10	13
West Team	7	3	7	14	31
- Date: January 19, 2008
- Season: 2007
- Stadium: Robertson Stadium
- Location: Houston
- MVP: Josh Johnson (QB, San Diego) & Spencer Larsen (LB, Arizona)
- Referee: Clete Blakeman
- Attendance: 15,328

United States TV coverage
- Network: ESPN2

The 2008 East–West Shrine Game was the 83rd staging of the all-star college football exhibition game featuring NCAA Division I Football Bowl Subdivision players. The game featured over 100 players from the 2007 college football season, and prospects for the 2008 draft of the professional National Football League (NFL). In the week prior to the game, scouts from all 32 NFL teams attended. The proceeds from the East–West Shrine Game benefit Shriners Hospitals for Children.

The game was played on January 19, 2008, at 6 p.m. CT at Robertson Stadium on the campus of the University of Houston, and was televised by ESPN2.

The offensive MVP was Josh Johnson (QB, San Diego), while the defensive MVP was Spencer Larsen (LB, Arizona). The Pat Tillman Award was presented to Justin Tryon (DB, Arizona State); the award "is presented to a player who best exemplifies character, intelligence, sportsmanship and service".

== Scoring summary ==
Scoring summary

Quarter	Time	Drive			Team	Scoring information	Score	
Quarter	Time	Plays	Yards	TOP	Team	Scoring information	East	West
1	4:07	11	37	4:52	East	42-yard field goal by Taylor Mehlhaff	3	0
1	0:49				West	Kevin Robinson 72-yard punt return, Garrett Hartley kick good	3	7
2	0:00	6	76	0:45	West	23-yard field goal by Garrett Hartley	3	10
3	5:54	3	39	1:12	West	Aldridge 4-yard touchdown run, Garrett Hartley kick good	3	17
4	13:44	13	75	7:10	East	28-yard field goal by Taylor Mehlhaff	6	17
4	11:00	5	70	2:44	West	Kevin Robinson 5-yard touchdown reception from Josh Johnson, Garrett Hartley kick good	6	24
4	4:18	10	72	6:50	East	Cory Boyd 5-yard touchdown run, Taylor Mehlhaff kick good	13	24
4	0:30				West	Interception returned 20 yards for touchdown by Alvin Bowen, Garrett Hartley kick good	13	31
"TOP" = time of possession. For other American football terms, see Glossary of American football.							13	31

=== Statistics ===
Statistics	East	West
First downs	17	20
Rushes-yards	29-126	21-176
Passing yards	184	186
Passes, Comp-Att-Int	16-36-4	19-35-0
Return yards	86	218
Punts-average	3-53.7	4-40.2
Fumbles-lost	0-0	3-2
Penalties-yards	5-49	3-15
Time of Possession	35:18	24:42
Attendance	15,328	

== Coaching staff ==
East head coach: Dick Vermeil
West head coach: Mike White
