= 2004 East–West Shrine Game =

- All–Star Bowl Game
East Team	West Team
7	28
Head coach: Walt Harris (Pittsburgh)	Head coach: John Robinson (UNLV)
	1	2	3	4	Total
East	0	7	0	0	7
West	7	14	7	0	28
- Date: January 10, 2004
- Season: 2003
- Stadium: SBC Park
- Location: San Francisco, California
- MVP: Ryan Dinwiddie (QB, Boise State) & Brandon Chillar (LB, UCLA)
- Favorite: East by 3
- Referee: Jack Folliard
- Attendance: 25,602

United States TV coverage
- Network: ESPN

The 2004 East–West Shrine Game was the 79th staging of the all-star college football exhibition game featuring NCAA Division I Football Bowl Subdivision players. The game featured over 90 players from the 2003 college football season, and prospects for the 2004 draft of the professional National Football League (NFL). The proceeds from the East–West Shrine Game benefit Shriners Hospitals for Children.

The game was played on January 10, 2004, at 11 a.m. PT at SBC Park in San Francisco, and was televised by ESPN. One of the players in the game was Neil Parry of San Jose State, whose lower right leg had been amputated in October 2000; Parry played on special teams for the West squad and registered a tackle in the second quarter.

The offensive MVP was Ryan Dinwiddie (QB, Boise State), while the defensive MVP was Brandon Chillar (LB, UCLA).

== Scoring summary ==
Scoring summary

Quarter	Time	Drive			Team	Scoring information	Score	
Quarter	Time	Plays	Yards	TOP	Team	Scoring information	East	West
1	7:08	6	24	3:06	West	Larry Croom 1-yard touchdown run, Mark Gould kick good	0	7
2	14:24	9	44	3:16	East	Rod Rutherford 1-yard touchdown run, Billy Bennett kick good	7	7
2	6:55	5	12	2:03	West	Larry Croom 1-yard touchdown run, Mark Gould kick good	7	14
2	2:12	11	71	3:14	West	Bernard Berrian 1-yard touchdown reception from Ryan Dinwiddie, Mark Gould kick good	7	21
3	4:58				West	Interception returned 56 yards for touchdown by Brandon Chillar, Mark Gould kick good	7	28
"TOP" = time of possession. For other American football terms, see Glossary of American football.							7	28

=== Statistics ===
Statistics	East	West
First downs	14	19
Rushes-yards	16-36	29-91
Passing yards	209	202
Passes, Comp-Att-Int	27-49-4	25-36-3
Return yards	60	45
Punts-average	5-43.8	6-36.7
Fumbles-lost	1-1	0-0
Penalties-yards	5-35	2-20
Time of Possession	28:54	31:06
Attendance	25,602	

== Coaching staff ==
East head coach: Walt Harris
East assistants: Tom Freeman & Paul Rhoads
West head coach: John Robinson
West assistants: Bruce Snyder & Mike Bradeson

== Rosters ==
Source:

== 2004 NFL draft ==
Shrine game records indicate that 40 players in the game were selected in the 2004 NFL Draft. Players taken in the first three rounds:

Player	Pos.	College	Round/Pick (Overall)	Team selected by
Jason Babin	DL	Western Michigan	1/27 (27)	Houston Texans
Daryl Smith	LB	Georgia Tech	2/7 (39)	Jacksonville Jaguars
Terry "Tank" Johnson	DL	Washington	2/15 (47)	Chicago Bears
Darius Watts	WR	Marshall	2/22 (54)	Denver Broncos
Ben Hartsock	TE	Ohio State	3/5 (68)	Indianapolis Colts
Tim Anderson	DL	Ohio State	3/11 (74)	Buffalo Bills
Bernard Berrian	WR	Fresno State	3/15 (78)	Chicago Bears
Marquis Cooper	LB	Washington	3/16 (79)	Tampa Bay Buccaneers
Jorge Cordova	LB	Nevada	3/23 (86)	Jacksonville Jaguars
Darrion Scott	DL	Ohio State	3/25 (88)	Minnesota Vikings
