= Marquice Williams =

American football player & coach (born 1985)

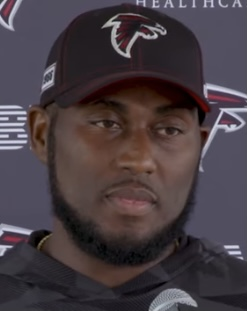
- Williams with the Atlanta Falcons in 2021

Las Vegas Raiders
- Title: Senior special teams assistant

Personal information
- Born: November 8, 1985 (age 40); Palo Alto, California, U.S.

Career information
- Position: Safety
- College: University of Mary

Career history
- Winona State (2010) Outside linebackers coach & assistant special teams coach; Central Oklahoma (2011) Linebackers coach; South Dakota (2012–2015) Defensive line coach & community relations liaison (2012–2015) Special teams coordinator (2015); Chicago Bears (2013–2014) Bill Walsh NFL diversity coaching fellowship; Detroit Lions (2015) Bill Walsh NFL diversity coaching fellowship; San Diego / Los Angeles Chargers (2016–2017) Assistant special teams coach; Los Angeles Chargers (2018) Defensive assistant; Detroit Lions (2019–2020) Assistant special teams coach; Atlanta Falcons (2021–2025) Special teams coordinator; Las Vegas Raiders (2026–present) Senior special teams assistant

Marquice O'Brien Williams (born November 8, 1985) is an American football coach and the senior special teams assistant for the Las Vegas Raiders of the National Football League (NFL). He previously served as an assistant coach for the Detroit Lions, Houston Texans, Chicago Bears, and Atlanta Falcons of the NFL.

== Early life ==
Williams is a native of Fresno, California and played as a safety at Fresno City College and at the University of Mary. In 2005, Williams earned his associates degree from Fresno City College and in 2008, he earned his bachelor's degree in university studies from the University of Mary.

== Coaching career ==
=== Winona State ===
In 2010, Williams began his coaching career as an outside linebackers coach and assistant special teams coach at Winona State University.

=== Central Oklahoma ===
In 2011, Williams joined the University of Central Oklahoma as their linebackers coach.

=== South Dakota ===
In 2012, Williams was hired by the University of South Dakota to be their defensive line coach and community relations liaison. In 2015, Williams was given an additional role as special teams coordinator.

=== Chicago Bears ===
In 2013, while still coaching with the University of South Dakota, Williams joined the Bill Walsh NFL diversity coaching fellowship with the Chicago Bears.

=== Detroit Lions ===
In 2015, Williams joined the Detroit Lions as a member of the Bill Walsh NFL diversity coaching fellowship program. He served as a coaching intern for linebackers and special teams.

=== San Diego / Los Angeles Chargers ===
In 2016, Williams was hired by the San Diego Chargers as an assistant special teams coach under head coach Mike McCoy. In 2017, Williams was retained by the Los Angeles Chargers under head coach Anthony Lynn and served as a defensive assistant for the Chargers in 2018.

=== Detroit Lions (second stint) ===
In 2019, Williams was hired by the Detroit Lions as their assistant special teams coach under head coach Matt Patricia.

=== Atlanta Falcons ===
On January 21, 2021, Williams was hired by the Atlanta Falcons as their special teams coordinator under head coach Arthur Smith.

On January 27, 2024, Williams was retained by the Atlanta Falcons as their special teams coordinator under head coach Raheem Morris.

=== Las Vegas Raiders ===
On February 19, 2026, Williams was hired by the Las Vegas Raiders to serve as the team's senior special teams assistant under new head coach Klint Kubiak.
