= Josh Johnson (quarterback) =

American football quarterback (born 1986)

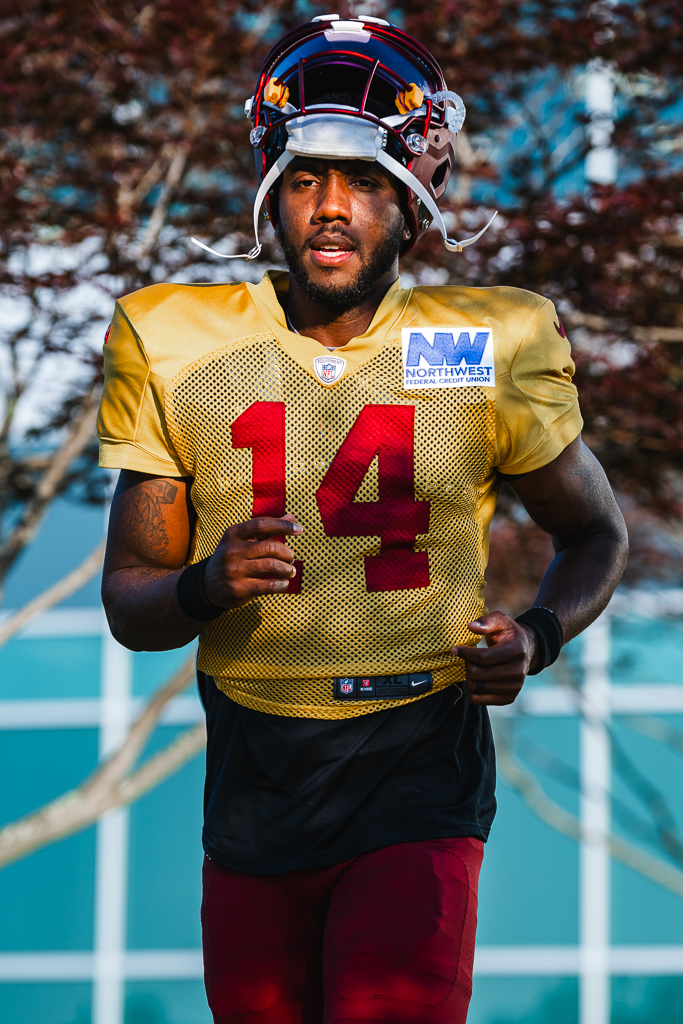
- Johnson with the Washington Commanders in 2025

No. 9 – Arizona Cardinals
- Position: Quarterback
- Roster status: Active

Personal information
- Born: May 15, 1986 (age 40); Oakland, California, U.S.
- Listed height: 6 ft 3 in (1.91 m)
- Listed weight: 219 lb (99 kg)

Career information
- High school: Oakland Tech
- College: San Diego (2004–2007)
- NFL draft: 2008: 5th round, 160th overall pick

Career history
- Tampa Bay Buccaneers (2008–2011); San Francisco 49ers (2012)*; Sacramento Mountain Lions (2012); Cleveland Browns (2012); Cincinnati Bengals (2013); San Francisco 49ers (2014); Cincinnati Bengals (2015)*; New York Jets (2015)*; Indianapolis Colts (2015); Buffalo Bills (2015); Baltimore Ravens (2016)*; New York Giants (2016); Houston Texans (2017); Oakland Raiders (2018)*; San Diego Fleet (2018)*; Washington Redskins (2018); Detroit Lions (2019); Los Angeles Wildcats (2020); San Francisco 49ers (2020)*; New York Jets (2021); Baltimore Ravens (2021); Denver Broncos (2022); San Francisco 49ers (2022); Baltimore Ravens (2023–2024); Washington Commanders (2025); Cincinnati Bengals (2026)*; Arizona Cardinals (2026–present)
- * Offseason or practice squad member only

Awards and highlights
- XFL passer rating leader (2020); 2× consensus Mid-Major champion (2005, 2006); 2× PFL Offensive Player of the Year (2005, 2006); 3× First-team All-PFL (2005–2007); 3× I-AA All-American (2005–2007)

Career NFL statistics as of Week Week 11, 2026
- Passing attempts: 443
- Passing completions: 260
- Completion percentage: 58.7%
- TD–INT: 15–18
- Passing yards: 2,824
- Passer rating: 71.9
- Rushing yards: 481
- Rushing touchdowns: 2
- Stats at Pro Football Reference

Joshua Javon Johnson (born May 15, 1986) is an American professional football quarterback for the Arizona Cardinals of the National Football League (NFL). He has been a member of 15 different NFL teams during his career. Johnson also played in the United Football League (UFL) and XFL.

Johnson played college football for the San Diego Toreros, earning three consecutive I-AA All-American honors between 2005 and 2007 and setting the FCS record for passer rating. He was selected by the Tampa Bay Buccaneers in the fifth round of the 2008 NFL draft. Primarily a backup during his career, Johnson has started games for the Buccaneers, Washington Redskins / Commanders, and Baltimore Ravens, while also seeing playing time with the Cleveland Browns, New York Jets, San Francisco 49ers, and Bengals. His longest stint has been with the Buccaneers, where Johnson spent his first four years, and his tenures with other teams have mostly lasted no longer than one season.

== Early life ==
Johnson was born on May 15, 1986, in Oakland, California. He attended Oakland Technical High School and was a letterman in football, basketball, and track & field. In football, as a senior, Johnson was named the team's Most Improved Player, was a first-team All-City selection, and led the team to the Oakland Athletic League Championship. He was also a teammate of cousin Marshawn Lynch.

== College career ==
=== 2004–2005 ===
Johnson enrolled at the University of San Diego in 2004, where he played for the Toreros as a backup quarterback to Todd Mortensen. Johnson finished the season with 135 passing yards and an interception to go along with 13 carries for 39 yards and two touchdowns.

Johnson earned the starting job after Mortensen's departure for the 2005 season and earned some All-American honors after breaking numerous records. Johnson, who earned three conference player of the week honors, totaled eight games with four or more passing touchdowns. His best game of the season came against Valparaiso, when he threw for a school-record seven touchdowns (all coming in the first half). Johnson also had five touchdowns and 375 yards against Morehead State in the Pioneer Football League Championship victory. He finished the season with 3,256 passing yards, 36 touchdowns, and eight interceptions to go along with 86 carries for 379 yards and four touchdowns en route to being named team MVP.

=== 2006 ===
After his record-setting sophomore season, Johnson was named third-team Associated Press All-America on his junior season. He was also named PFL Offensive Player of the Year as he led San Diego to a 10–0 start. Johnson led San Diego to their first Top 25 appearance in school history and finished the season with 3,320 passing yards, 34 touchdowns, and five interceptions to go along with 107 carries for 720 yards and 11 touchdowns. Johnson led the FCS in total offense, passing efficiency, passing yards, and points responsible for. He totaled four games with over 300 yards passing, while his season-best was a 384-yard performance against Jacksonville. Johnson also had a 25-yard touchdown reception on the season. In the victory over Jacksonville, he set a school-record with 470 total yards of offense. Johnson finished sixth in the voting for the Walter Payton Award, for the best player in the FCS.

=== 2007 ===
After two highly productive seasons, Johnson entered the 2007 campaign on the Walter Payton Award watch list and was named a Preseason All-American. He was suspended for the season opener against Azusa Pacific for violating team rules.

Making his season debut the following week against Marist, Johnson completed 24 of 28 passes for a then career-high 403 yards and four touchdowns in the victory. He followed that performance with consecutive six-touchdown passing games against Northern Colorado and Butler. In the latter contest, Johnson became the Toreros’ all-time leader in career passing yards.

Against Davidson College, he threw for a career-high 428 yards and six touchdowns. Johnson finished the season with 2,988 passing yards, a school-record 43 touchdowns, and an interception to go along with 107 carries for 726 yards and two touchdowns. He set school records for career touchdown passes and passing yards, in addition to already holding the career completions record. Johnson was named a third-team FCS All-American and a finalist for the Walter Payton Award, finishing third in the voting behind winner Jayson Foster. Johnson also holds the record for the highest career passer efficiency (176.68) in NCAA Division I football history.

Following his senior season, Johnson was invited to play in the 2008 East–West Shrine Game in Houston, Texas, where he was named the game's Offensive MVP after completing five of 11 passes for 78 yards and a touchdown, while rushing for 103 yards on three attempts.

== Professional career ==
=== Pre-draft ===
Despite his small school background, Johnson had his name on many teams' draft boards. Johnson was aided by his impressive NFL Combine performances, in which he posted the best 40-yard dash time of 4.55 and vertical jump of any quarterback in the 2008 NFL Combine.

Pre-draft measurables
Height	Weight	Arm length	Hand span	40-yard dash	10-yard split	20-yard split	20-yard shuttle	Three-cone drill	Vertical jump	Broad jump	Wonderlic
6 ft 2 3/4 in (1.90 m)	213 lb (97 kg)	33 in (0.84 m)	9 in (0.23 m)	4.55 s	1.58 s	2.63 s	4.42 s	7.56 s	33.5 in (0.85 m)	9 ft 2 in (2.79 m)	24
All values from NFL Combine

=== Tampa Bay Buccaneers ===
==== 2008 ====
Johnson was selected by the Tampa Bay Buccaneers in the fifth round (160th overall) of the 2008 NFL draft. He saw no playing time as a rookie.

==== 2009 ====
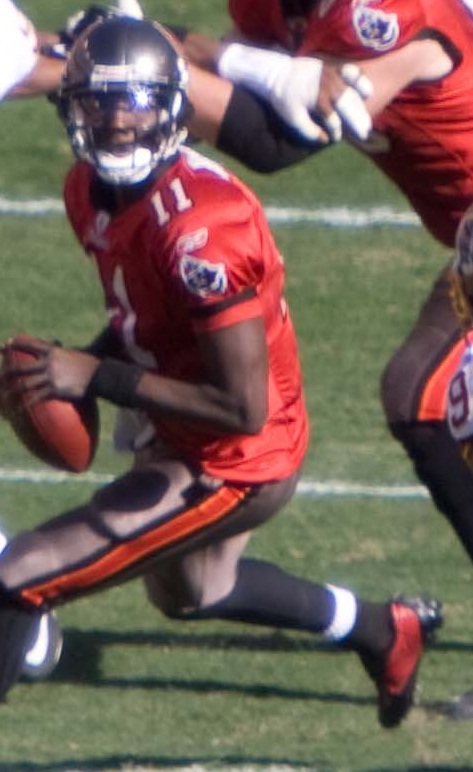
Johnson in 2009

Johnson made his first appearance in a regular season NFL game in Week 3 against the New York Giants. When Johnson replaced Byron Leftwich as Tampa Bay's quarterback with 9:33 remaining, the Buccaneers had accumulated only 35 total yards and one first down against the favored Giants. Taking his first pro snap, Johnson found Antonio Bryant for six yards, marking the afternoon's first reception by a Tampa Bay wide receiver. Johnson ran for 15 yards and added three more completions for 30 yards as the Buccaneers finished the 24–0 shutout loss with 86 yards. Johnson drove the Buccaneers from their own 24 to the New York five-yard line in his only possession. One of Johnson's passes zipped through Michael Clayton's hands in the end zone. Johnson was named the starting quarterback for the Week 4 matchup against the Washington Redskins. He threw his first career touchdown to Antonio Bryant on his first pass of the game and finished the 16–13 road loss with 106 passing yards, the aforementioned touchdown, and an interception to go along with seven carries for 41 yards.

During a Week 5 33–14 road loss to the Philadelphia Eagles, Johnson threw for 240 yards, two touchdowns, and three interceptions while also rushing five times for 40 yards. In the next game against the Carolina Panthers, he had 147 passing yards and an interception to go along with eight carries for 45 yards during the 28–21 loss. The following week against the New England Patriots in London, Johnson completed nine of 26 passes for 156 yards, a touchdown, and three interceptions in the 35–7 loss.

Johnson finished the 2009 season with 685 passing yards, four touchdowns, and eight interceptions to go along with 22 carries for 148 yards in six games and four starts.

==== 2010 ====
During the 2010 season, Johnson was a backup to Josh Freeman, completing 14 of 16 passes for 111 yards in 11 games and no starts.

==== 2011 ====
During Week 13, Johnson started in place of an injured Josh Freeman against the Panthers. Johnson threw for 229 yards, a touchdown, and an interception while also rushing five times for 45 yards in the 38–19 loss. In the next game against the Jacksonville Jaguars, he finished with three passing yards and an interception out of two pass attempts during the 41–14 road loss.

Johnson finished the 2011 season with 246 passing yards, a touchdown, and two interceptions to go along with 11 carries for 67 yards in nine games and one start.

=== San Francisco 49ers (first stint) ===
On March 22, 2012, Johnson signed a two-year deal with the San Francisco 49ers, reuniting with his coach from the University of San Diego, Jim Harbaugh. On August 31, Johnson was one of 21 players cut as the 49ers trimmed their roster to the 53-man limit for the regular season.

Johnson tried out for the Chicago Bears on December 12, 2012.

=== Sacramento Mountain Lions ===
Johnson signed with the Sacramento Mountain Lions of the United Football League on September 19, 2012. He started the season opener against the Omaha Nighthawks but exited the game with a knee contusion, causing him to miss the next two weeks. Johnson returned to start against the Virginia Destroyers, completing 13 of 22 passes for 159 yards in a 20–17 victory. He appeared in two games overall during the 2012 season before the league suspended operations following Week 4.

=== Cleveland Browns ===
On December 26, 2012, the Cleveland Browns announced that they signed Johnson after injuries to Brandon Weeden and Colt McCoy. After an injury to starter Thad Lewis, Johnson played for one snap in the regular season finale against the Pittsburgh Steelers. The single snap resulted in a sack fumble.

=== Cincinnati Bengals (first stint) ===
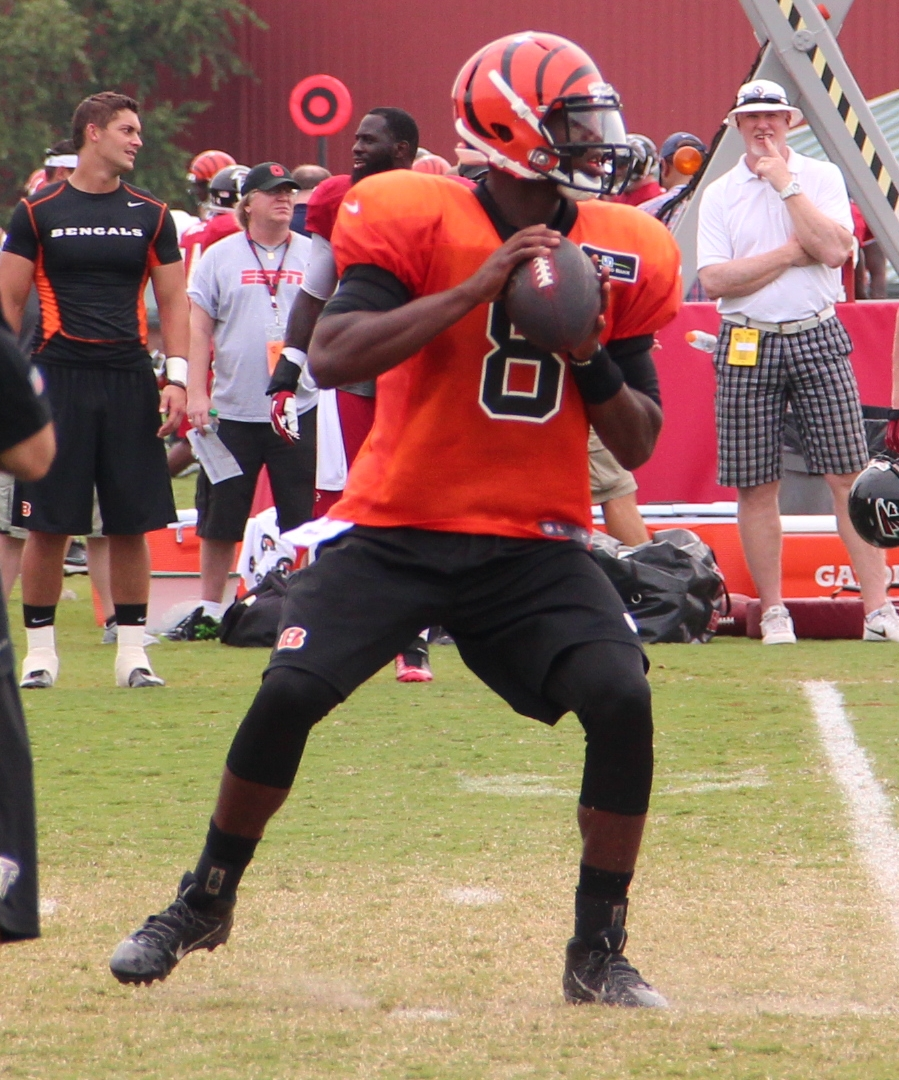
Johnson in 2013

On March 21, 2013, Johnson signed with the Cincinnati Bengals. He finished the 2013 season with seven carries for 20 yards.

Johnson was released on May 12, 2014.

=== San Francisco 49ers (second stint) ===
Johnson re-signed with the 49ers on May 15, 2014. He was released on September 20, but was re-signed three days later. Johnson was released again on October 10 and was re-signed four days later. He was repeatedly signed and released to give the 49ers a 54th roster spot.

=== Cincinnati Bengals (second stint) ===
Johnson was signed by the Bengals on April 2, 2015. He was released on August 25.

=== New York Jets (first stint) ===
Johnson signed with the New York Jets on August 27, 2015. He was released nine days later.

=== Indianapolis Colts ===
On October 2, 2015, Johnson signed with the Indianapolis Colts due to an injury to starter Andrew Luck. He was released three days later. Johnson was re-signed on October 7, but was released again five days later.

=== Buffalo Bills ===
On October 13, 2015, Johnson signed with the Buffalo Bills.

=== Baltimore Ravens (first stint) ===
Johnson signed with the Baltimore Ravens on May 15, 2016. He was released on September 3.

=== New York Giants ===
Johnson was signed by the New York Giants on September 5, 2016. He was active for only two games during the regular season due to injuries to backup quarterback Ryan Nassib.

On March 17, 2017, Johnson signed a two-year contract with the Giants. On September 2, he was released during preseason cuts.

=== Houston Texans ===
On November 7, 2017, Johnson was signed by the Houston Texans after the release of Matt McGloin. He was released on November 22. Johnson was re-signed on December 27 after an injury to Taylor Heinicke.

=== Oakland Raiders ===
On March 19, 2018, Johnson signed with his hometown team, the Oakland Raiders. He was released on May 20.

=== San Diego Fleet ===
In 2018, Johnson was assigned to the San Diego Fleet of the Alliance of American Football. In November, he was protected by the team in the 2019 AAF QB Draft with the first overall pick. Shortly afterwards, Johnson was signed by the Washington Redskins before the AAF season began and never played for the team.

=== Washington Redskins (first stint) ===
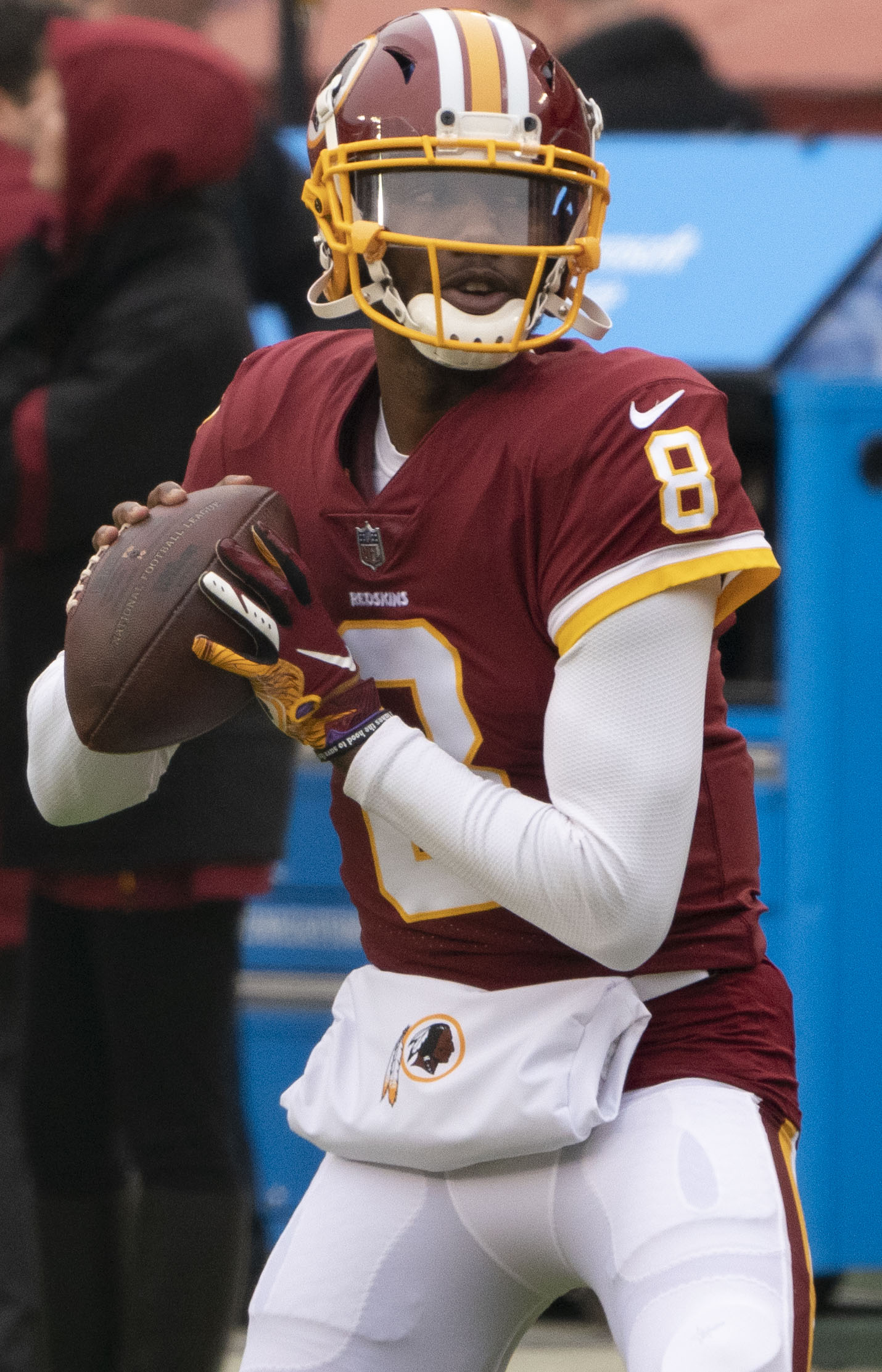
Johnson in 2018

On December 5, 2018, Johnson signed a one-year contract with the Washington Redskins to be a backup to Mark Sanchez after season-ending leg injuries to Colt McCoy and Alex Smith. Johnson said that he played a Madden NFL video game to help learn the names of his new teammates.

During Week 14, Johnson appeared in his first game after Sanchez was benched against the Giants in the third quarter of the 40–16 loss. It was Johnson's first appearance in an NFL game since 2013 with the Bengals. He finished the game completing 11 of 16 passes for 195 yards, a touchdown (his first touchdown since 2011 with the Buccaneers), and an interception while also rushing seven times for 45 yards and his first career rushing touchdown. After the game, head coach Jay Gruden announced that Johnson would be the starter for the next game against the Jaguars. Johnson finished the 16–13 road victory with 151 passing yards and a touchdown to go along with nine carries for 49 yards, marking his first career win as a starting quarterback in the NFL. The following week, the Redskins went on the road to face the Tennessee Titans in a crucial matchup to maintain their playoff hopes. Despite leading for most of the game, Washington's defense allowed a costly go-ahead touchdown with about four minutes remaining in the fourth quarter. Down 19–16, Johnson attempted to lead the Redskins down the field for a potential game-tying drive, but was intercepted first by safety Kevin Byard and then by cornerback Malcolm Butler after the Redskins managed to get the ball back with 14 seconds remaining. Washington would go on to lose 25–16, essentially ending their playoff chances. Johnson finished the game going 13-of-23 with 153 yards, a touchdown, and the two aforementioned interceptions. In the regular-season finale against the Philadelphia Eagles, he threw for 91 yards and an interception during the 24–0 shutout loss. Johnson had ankle surgery after the season and was unable to return to the Fleet when his contract with the Redskins expired.

Johnson finished the 2018 season with 590 passing yards, three touchdowns, and four interceptions to go along with 23 carries for 120 yards and a touchdown in four games and three starts.

=== Detroit Lions ===
On August 10, 2019, Johnson was signed by the Detroit Lions. He was active the first two games as the backup to Matthew Stafford, but was released after the team signed Jeff Driskel on September 17.

=== Los Angeles Wildcats ===
On November 22, 2019, Johnson was allocated to the Los Angeles Wildcats of the XFL as part of the 2020 XFL Supplemental Draft. Three days later, the Lions tried to re-sign Johnson, but the XFL did not allow him to leave his contract with the Wildcats. Despite the Wildcats finishing 2–3 in the five-game COVID-19 pandemic shortened season in 2020, Johnson performed admirably in four games (missing Week 1 with an injury) by completing 81 of 135 passes for 1,076 yards, 11 touchdowns, and two interceptions for a passer rating of 106.3. As a result, he was named the highest graded quarterback in the XFL by Pro Football Focus.

Johnson had his contract terminated when the league suspended operations on April 10, 2020.

=== San Francisco 49ers (third stint) ===
Johnson was signed to the 49ers' practice squad on November 11, 2020. He was placed on the practice squad/COVID-19 list on December 22, and was restored to the practice squad nine days later. Johnson signed a reserve/future contract on January 15, 2021. He was released on June 1.

=== New York Jets (second stint) ===
On August 4, 2021, Johnson signed with the Jets. He was released on August 31, but was re-signed to the practice squad the next day.

After starting quarterback Zach Wilson suffered a sprained PCL in Week 7, Johnson was elevated to the active roster as the second option behind Mike White. While White was being evaluated for a potential injury during the next game against the Bengals, Johnson took the field during the third quarter, his first NFL appearance since 2018. Johnson completed two of four passes for 17 yards, setting up a game-tying field goal before White returned on New York's next possession. The Jets subsequently won 34–31. The following week against the Colts on Thursday Night Football, Johnson again relieved an injured White during the Jets' second drive. He threw for a career-high 317 yards and three touchdowns, but was intercepted on New York's final drive in the 45–30 road loss. Johnson was reverted to the practice squad after the game.

=== Baltimore Ravens (second stint) ===
On December 15, 2021, Johnson was signed from the Jets' practice squad by the Ravens. He was forced into the starting role in Week 16 against the Bengals due to Lamar Jackson having an ankle injury and Tyler Huntley testing positive for COVID-19. Johnson completed 28 of 40 passes for 304 yards, two touchdowns, and an interception during the 41–21 road loss.

=== Denver Broncos ===
On March 18, 2022, Johnson signed with the Denver Broncos. He was released on August 30, but was re-signed to the practice squad the next day. On October 22, Johnson was elevated to the team's active roster following an injury to starting quarterback Russell Wilson.

=== San Francisco 49ers (fourth stint) ===
On December 4, 2022, Johnson was signed to the 49ers active roster after a season-ending foot injury to quarterback Jimmy Garoppolo. On January 29, 2023, Johnson played in his first playoff game in the NFC Championship Game against the Eagles in relief of injured quarterback Brock Purdy, who tore his ulnar collateral ligament. Johnson completed seven of 13 passes for 74 yards with a lost fumble before leaving the eventual 31–7 road loss with a concussion during the third quarter.

=== Baltimore Ravens (third stint) ===
On May 22, 2023, Johnson signed with the Ravens. He was released on August 29, but was re-signed two days later. Johnson was released again on September 23, but was re-signed again two days later. Johnson was the third-string quarterback behind Lamar Jackson and Tyler Huntley and made no appearances during the regular season and postseason.

On March 14, 2024, Johnson re-signed with the Ravens. He ended up being second on the depth chart behind Jackson after Huntley signed with the Cleveland Browns during the offseason. Johnson's first action of the season came in the fourth quarter of the Week 4 35–10 victory over the Buffalo Bills as he handed the ball off to Derrick Henry twice before throwing a one-yard pass to him with the drive ending with a punt.

=== Washington Commanders (second stint) ===
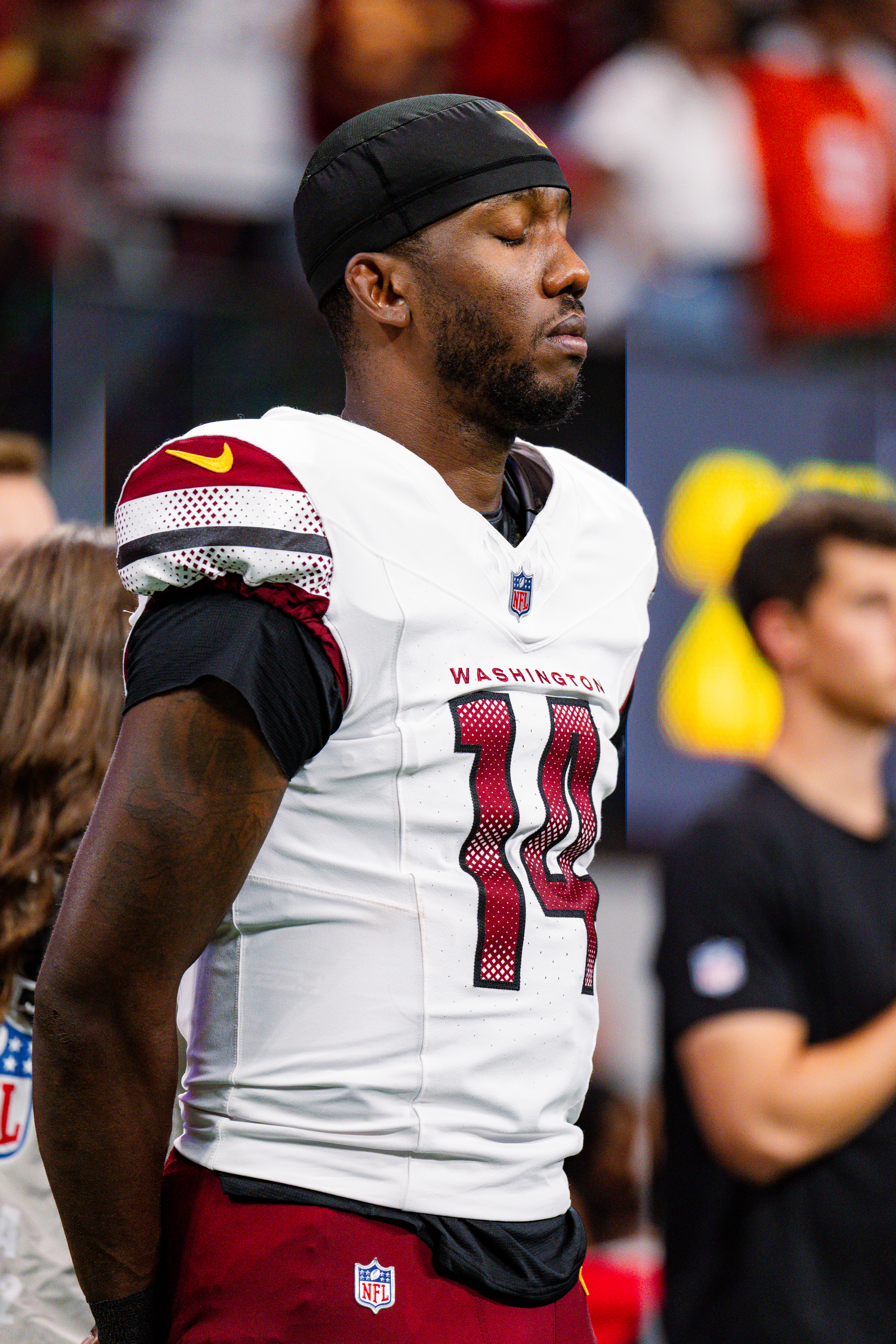
Johnson in 2025

On April 11, 2025, Johnson signed a one-year contract to return to the Washington franchise, now renamed the Washington Commanders.

On December 24, Johnson was named the starter for the Week 17 matchup on Christmas Day against the Dallas Cowboys. He finished the 30–23 loss completing 15-of-23 passes for 198 yards. In the regular season finale against the Philadelphia Eagles, Johnson had 131 passing yards, a touchdown, and an interception to go along with nine carries for 45 yards and a touchdown during the 24–17 road victory, earning his second career win as a starter.

Johnson finished the 2025 season with 372 passing yards, a touchdown, and two interceptions to go along with 12 carries for 55 yards and a touchdown in five games and two starts.

=== Cincinnati Bengals (third stint) ===
On March 14, 2026, Johnson signed a one-year, $1.5 million contract with the Cincinnati Bengals. On August 30, Johnson was released by the Bengals as a part of final roster cuts. He was re-signed to the practice squad two days later.

=== Arizona Cardinals ===
On November 9, 2026, Johnson was signed to the Arizona Cardinals' active roster from the Bengals practice squad. On November 21, 2026, Johnson was named the starter prior to Week 11.

== Career statistics ==
Legend
	Led the league
**Bold**	Career high

=== NFL ===
==== Regular season ====
Year	Team	Games			Passing									Rushing					Sacked		Fumbles	
Year	Team	GP	GS	Record	Cmp	Att	Pct	Yds	Y/A	Lng	TD	Int	Rtg	Att	Yds	Y/A	Lng	TD	Sck	Yds	Fum	Lost
2009	TB	6	4	0–4	**63**	**125**	50.4	**685**	5.5	35	**4**	**8**	50.9	22	**148**	6.7	**29**	0	**11**	59	**7**	**1**
2010	TB	11	0	—	14	16	**87.5**	111	6.9	22	0	0	95.6	4	39	**9.8**	14	0	2	8	0	0
2011	TB	9	1	0–1	19	36	52.8	246	6.8	42	1	2	60.6	11	67	6.1	14	0	3	24	1	**1**
2012	CLE	1	0	—	0	0	0.0	0	0.0	0	0	0	0.0	0	0	0.0	0	0	1	8	1	**1**
2013	CIN	2	0	—	0	0	0.0	0	0.0	0	0	0	0.0	7	20	2.9	10	0	0	0	1	0
2014	SF	0	0	—	DNP																	
2015	IND	0	0	—	DNP																	
2015	BUF	0	0	—	DNP																	
2016	NYG	0	0	—	DNP																	
2017	HOU	0	0	—	DNP																	
2018	WAS	4	3	1–2	52	91	57.1	590	6.5	**79**	3	4	69.4	**23**	120	5.2	16	**1**	9	**67**	2	0
2019	DET	0	0	—	DNP																	
2021	NYJ	3	0	—	29	45	64.4	334	7.4	26	3	1	**99.7**	4	18	4.5	11	0	2	14	0	0
2021	BAL	1	1	0–1	28	40	70.0	304	**7.6**	28	2	1	98.3	5	10	2.0	7	0	1	9	2	0
2022	SF	2	0	—	1	2	50.0	10	5.0	10	0	0	64.6	2	3	1.5	4	0	1	0	0	0
2023	BAL	0	0	—	DNP																	
2024	BAL	6	0	—	2	3	66.7	17	5.7	16	0	0	81.2	4	1	0.3	2	0	1	5	0	0
2025	WAS	5	2	1–1	34	54	63.0	372	6.9	41	1	2	74.0	12	55	4.6	13	**1**	2	14	2	**1**
Career		50	11	2–9	242	412	58.7	2,669	6.5	79	14	18	71.1	94	481	5.1	29	2	32	208	16	4

==== Postseason ====
Year	Team	Games			Passing									Rushing					Sacked		Fumbles	
Year	Team	GP	GS	Record	Cmp	Att	Pct	Yds	Y/A	Lng	TD	Int	Rtg	Att	Yds	Y/A	Lng	TD	Sck	Yds	Fum	Lost
2013	CIN	0	0	—	DNP																	
2022	SF	1	0	—	7	13	53.8	74	5.7	22	0	0	70.7	2	2	1.0	2	0	2	14	1	1
2023	BAL	0	0	—	DNP																	
2024	BAL	0	0	—	DNP																	
Career		1	0	—	7	13	53.8	74	5.7	22	0	0	70.7	2	2	1.0	2	0	2	14	1	1

=== UFL ===
Year	Team	Games			Passing									Rushing					Sacked	
Year	Team	GP	GS	Record	Cmp	Att	Pct	Yds	Y/A	Lng	TD	Int	Rtg	Att	Yds	Y/A	Lng	TD	Sck	Yds
2012	SAC	2	2	1–1	28	48	58.3	397	8.3	52	2	1	90.4	10	54	5.4	24	0	1	7
Career		2	2	1–1	28	48	58.3	397	8.3	52	2	1	90.4	10	54	5.4	24	0	1	7

=== XFL ===
Year	Team	Games			Passing									Rushing					Sacked	
Year	Team	GP	GS	Record	Cmp	Att	Pct	Yds	Y/A	Lng	TD	Int	Rtg	Att	Yds	Y/A	Lng	TD	Sck	Yds
2020	LA	4	4	2–2	81	135	60.0	1,092	8.1	54	11	2	106.8	15	30	2.0	8	0	5	22
Career		4	4	2–2	81	135	60.0	1,092	8.1	54	11	2	106.8	15	30	2.0	8	0	5	22

=== College ===
Legend
FCS record

Season	Team	Games			Passing								Rushing			
Season	Team	GP	GS	Record	Cmp	Att	Pct	Yds	Y/A	TD	Int	Rtg	Att	Yds	Avg	TD
2004	San Diego	8	0	—	12	22	54.5	135	6.1	0	1	97.0	13	39	3.0	2
2005	San Diego	12	12	**11–1**	**260**	**371**	**70.1**	3,256	8.8	36	**8**	171.5	86	379	4.4	4
2006	San Diego	12	12	**11–1**	246	**371**	66.3	**3,320**	8.9	34	5	169.0	**107**	720	6.7	**11**
2007	San Diego	10	10	8–2	206	301	68.4	2,988	**9.9**	**43**	1	**198.3**	101	**726**	**7.2**	2
Career		43	34	30–4	724	1,065	68.0	9,699	9.1	113	15	176.7	307	1,864	6.1	19
