= Michael Tauiliili =

American football player (born 1986)

No. 51, 59
- Position: Linebacker

Personal information
- Born: October 29, 1986 (age 40); Houston, Texas, U.S.
- Listed height: 5 ft 11 in (1.80 m)
- Listed weight: 235 lb (107 kg)

Career information
- High school: Alief Taylor (Houston)
- College: Duke (2005–2008)
- NFL draft: 2009: undrafted

Career history
- Indianapolis Colts (2009); Sacramento Mountain Lions (2010–2011); Kiel Baltic Hurricanes (2012)

Awards and highlights
- Second-team All-American (2008); First-team Freshman All-American (2005); First-team All-ACC (2008); ACC Defensive Freshman of the Year (2005); First-team freshman All-ACC (2005)

Michael Tauiliili (/taʊˌiːliˈiːli/; born October 29, 1986) is an American former football player. He played college football for the Duke Blue Devils, leading the Atlantic Coast Conference in total tackles during his senior year. He was not selected in the 2009 NFL draft, but was subsequently signed as a free agent by the Indianapolis Colts.

== Early life ==
Tauiliili was born Michael Brown in Houston, Texas and raised by parents Daryl McMullen and Iva Brown. His father played basketball at Tennessee State University. While at Duke University, Michael Brown changed his name to Tauiliili, with the explanation that it was the name of his maternal great-great-great-grandfather, a Samoan high chief.

He attended Alief Taylor High School, where he was a letter winner and team captain for three years. As a sophomore, he recorded 102 tackles and was named a second-team all-district player. As a junior, he recorded 111 total tackles, 14 for loss, and three sacks, and was named first-team all-district. As a senior, he recorded 121 total tackles, 15 for loss, four sacks, and one interception, and was again named a first-team all-district player. In his final two seasons, the team made state playoff appearances.

== College career ==
He attended Duke University where he majored in political science. As a true freshman in 2005, Tauiliili saw action in all 11 games, including 10 starts. He was the leading rookie linebacker in the nation with 92 tackles, including 10 tackles for loss, and three forced fumbles. He was the seventh overall tackler in the Atlantic Coast Conference (ACC). He was named the ACC Defensive Freshman of the Year, a first-team Freshman All-American, Sporting News first-team Freshman All-ACC, and Scout.com first-team Freshman All-American.

In 2006, he started all 12 games, and again led Duke in tackles, with 94 total, 10.0 for loss, and also recorded four quarterback hurries. That season, he became the second Blue Devil in school history to lead the team in tackles in both his freshman and sophomore years.

During the 2007 season, he started 11 of 12 games, sitting out the season-opener against Connecticut due to a suspension. Tauiliili recorded 108 total tackles, including 13.0 for loss, three interceptions, four sacks, two broken up passes, two quarterback hurries, one forced fumble, and one fumble recovery. He finished third in the conference in tackles per game.

In 2008, Tauliili started all 12 games, during which he recorded 140 total tackles, including 63 solo and 13.0 for loss, four interceptions, five broken up passes, five quarterback hurries, three forced fumbles, and one recovered fumble. He led the conference in total tackles and was named a first-team All-ACC player. In the win, 31–3, against Virginia, he recovered a fumble, forced a fumble, and intercepted a pass. For his performance in that game, the Walter Camp Foundation named him the National Defensive Player of the Week. Sports Illustrated named him a second-team Midseason All-American. After the season, the Walter Camp Foundation named him a second-team All-American. Tauiliili participated in the East-West Shrine Game as captain of the East squad. He recorded a game-high of 18 tackles and was named the Defensive Most Valuable Player.

== Professional career ==
NFL Draft Scout ranked Tauiliili as the 17th out of 149 inside linebacker prospects for the 2009 NFL draft. During the 2008 season, Sports Illustrated compared him to former first-round draft pick Jonathan Vilma in terms of stature and playing style. Tauiliili was not selected in the draft, but was signed as a free agent to a two-year contract by the Indianapolis Colts.
