= Spencer Larsen =

American football player (born 1984)

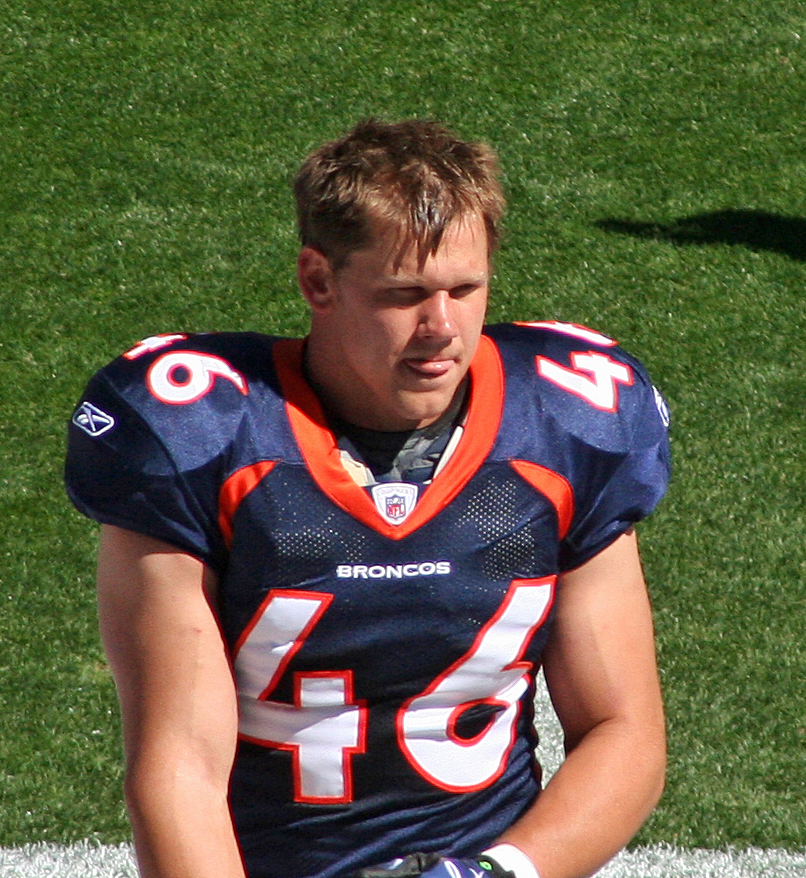
- Larsen with the Denver Broncos in 2010

No. 46
- Positions: Fullback, linebacker

Personal information
- Born: March 4, 1984 (age 42); Mesa, Arizona, U.S.
- Listed height: 6 ft 2 in (1.88 m)
- Listed weight: 235 lb (107 kg)

Career information
- High school: Highland (Gilbert, Arizona)
- College: Arizona (2002, 2005–2007)
- NFL draft: 2008: 6th round, 183rd overall pick

Career history
- Denver Broncos (2008−2011); New England Patriots (2012); Tampa Bay Buccaneers (2013)

Awards and highlights
- First-team All-Pac-10 (2007); Second-team All-Pac-10 (2006)

Career NFL statistics
- Total tackles: 41
- Rushing yards: 62
- Rushing average: 3.6
- Receptions: 14
- Receiving yards: 127
- Total touchdowns: 1
- Stats at Pro Football Reference

Spencer Larsen (born March 4, 1984) is an American former professional football player who was a fullback in the National Football League (NFL). He played college football for the Arizona Wildcats, primarily as a linebacker. Larsen was selected by the Denver Broncos in the sixth round of the 2008 NFL draft.

== Early life ==
Larsen earned SuperPrep All-Farwest honors and was named First-team All-State by The Arizona Republic as a senior at Highland High School in Gilbert, Arizona after recorded 124 tackles as a senior. He was also the All-Region co-Defensive Most Valuable Player.

== College career ==
In 2007 Larsen was a First-team All-Pacific-10 Conference as a senior at Arizona after leading the conference with 131 tackles (87 solo) in 12 games (12 starts). He added four sacks, one interception, five pass breakups, four fumble recoveries and three forced fumbles. The year before, 2006, Larsen received Second-team All-Pacific-10 Conference honors as a junior after making 89 tackles (63 solo), two sacks (11 yds.) and one interception in 12 games (12 starts). He also had three pass breakups, three fumble recoveries and two forced fumbles. He was also First-team Academic All-Conference. In 2005, he saw action in eight games (6 starts) as a sophomore and totaled 51 tackles (29 solo), one sack, one pass breakup and one fumble recovery. He also received Second-team academic All-Conference recognition. Larsen did not play football from 2003–04 because he was on a mission for the Church of Jesus Christ of Latter-day Saints in Chile. In 2002 Larsen played all 12 games (7 starts) as a true freshman for Arizona and recorded 41 tackles (30 solo), two sacks and three pass breakups and was named Third-team freshman All-America and First-team freshman All-Pacific-10 Conference by The Gridiron Report. He was the defensive MVP of the 2008 East–West Shrine Game.

== Professional career ==
Pre-draft measurables
Height	Weight	40-yard dash	10-yard split	20-yard split	20-yard shuttle	Three-cone drill	Vertical jump	Broad jump	Bench press
6 ft 1 3/4 in (1.87 m)	238 lb (108 kg)	4.94 s	1.69 s	2.87 s	4.55 s	7.68 s	28 1/2 in (0.72 m)	9 ft 5 in (2.87 m)	27 reps
All values from NFL Combine.

=== Denver Broncos ===
On November 16, 2008, in a Broncos 24–20 road win over the Atlanta Falcons, Larsen became the first NFL player since 2003 (and only the fourth since 1990) to start a game on both offense (fullback) and defense (linebacker). The positions fullback and linebacker both involve considerably more contact than the wide receiver / cornerback positions played by other modern two-way players such as Troy Brown, Deion Sanders, Julian Edelman, and Champ Bailey. He also played on special teams during the game, including the opening kickoff. Larsen earned Diet Pepsi NFL Rookie of the Week honors for the first time in his career for his performance against the Falcons.

=== New England Patriots ===
Larsen signed with the New England Patriots on March 22, 2012. He was placed on season-ending injured reserve on August 27, 2012 and released from the team on March 4, 2013.

=== Tampa Bay Buccaneers ===
On July 27, 2013, Larsen signed with the Tampa Bay Buccaneers. On August 26, 2013, he was released by the Buccaneers. Larsen re-signed with the team on September 10, 2013. He was released again on September 14, 2013. He was re-signed on September 25, 2013.
