= Kyle Shotwell =

American football player

Kyle Shotwell is a former American football linebacker, best known for winning the 2006 Buck Buchanan Award, awarded annually to the national defensive player of the year in the NCAA's Football Championship Subdivision.

== Early life ==
At the prep level, Shotwell starred at Goleta's Dos Pueblos High School, for which he was later selected to the Santa Barbara Athletic Round Table Hall of Fame in 2011.

== College career ==
Shotwell played the entirety of his NCAA career at Cal Poly in San Luis Obispo. He was announced as the Buchanan Award recipient in December 2006 in Tennessee. Shotwell collected 275 total voting points in the balloting for the award, including 23 first-place votes.

Following making a game-high seven tackles in the East-West Shrine Game, leading the West squad to a 21–3 win at Reliant Stadium, Shotwell won the Pat Tillman Award in 2007.

Collegiate Statistics
Year	GP	Tackles (Solo)	TFL - Yds.	Sacks	PBU	INT	Yds.	TD	FF	FR	Yds.	TD
2002 (RS)	0	-	-	-	-	-	-	-	-	-	-	-
2003 (Fr.)	11	24 (13)	2.5 (-11)	1.0	-	0	-	0	0	1	-	0
2004 (So.)	11	88 (53)	7.5 (-31)	4.0	2	2	19	0	3	2	39	0
2005 (Jr.)	13	158 (71)	13.5 (-63)	5.0	3	2	5	0	2	0	-	0
2006 (Sr.)	11	122 (62)	21.0 (-80)	7.0	2	0	65t	1	2	1	0	0
Totals	46	392 (199)	44.5 (-185)	17.0	7	4	89	1	7	4	39	0

== Professional career ==
Shotwell signed an undrafted free-agent contract with the Oakland Raiders in 2007. After being released by Oakland following the preseason, he joined the Philadelphia Eagles practice squad midway during the 2007 season.

He then signed with Indianapolis in January 2008, but was released by the Colts on August 30 following the completion of the preseason. However, in November 2008, he signed with Kansas City as a member of the Chiefs' practice squad, prior to becoming a coach in 2009.

Preseason NFL Statistics
Preseason	Team	GP	Tackles
2007	OAK	4	10
2008	IND	5	18
Totals		9	28
