= Delone Carter =

American football player (born 1987)

No. 34
- Position: Running back

Personal information
- Born: June 22, 1987 (age 39); Akron, Ohio, U.S.
- Listed height: 5 ft 9 in (1.75 m)
- Listed weight: 232 lb (105 kg)

Career information
- High school: Copley (OH)
- College: Syracuse
- NFL draft: 2011: 4th round, 119th overall pick

Career history
- Indianapolis Colts (2011–2012); Baltimore Ravens (2013)*; Jacksonville Jaguars (2013); Hamilton Tiger-Cats (2014)
- * Offseason or practice squad member only

Awards and highlights
- Second-team All-Big East (2010)

Career NFL statistics
- Rushing attempts: 133
- Rushing yards: 499
- Receptions: 6
- Receiving yards: 31
- Total touchdowns: 5
- Stats at Pro Football Reference

Delone M. Carter (born June 22, 1987) is an American former professional football player who was a running back in the National Football League (NFL). He played college football for the Syracuse Orange and was selected by the Indianapolis Colts in the fourth round of the 2011 NFL draft.

== Early life ==
Carter played for the Copley Indians at Copley High School.

== College career ==
Carter rushed for 1,233 yards on 231 carries and nine touchdowns as a senior. He was named the MVP of the 2010 Pinstripe Bowl after rushing for 198 yards on 27 carries and two touchdowns. He was also the offensive MVP of the 2011 East–West Shrine Game. Carter currently ranks fourth on the Syracuse all-time rushing yards list with 3,104.

=== College statistics ===
Year	Team	Att	Yards	Average	TDs	Receptions	Yards	TDs
2006	Syracuse	156	713	4.6	4	9	46	0
2007	Syracuse	Medical redshirt						
2008	Syracuse	23	137	6.0	0	0	0	0
2009	Syracuse	236	1,021	4.3	11	11	117	1
2010	Syracuse	231	1,233	5.3	9	8	45	0
Totals		646	3,104	4.8	24	28	208	1

== Professional career ==
Pre-draft measurables
Height	Weight	Arm length	Hand span	Wingspan	40-yard dash	10-yard split	20-yard split	20-yard shuttle	Three-cone drill	Vertical jump	Broad jump	Bench press
5 ft 8 5/8 in (1.74 m)	222 lb (101 kg)	31 in (0.79 m)	9 1/2 in (0.24 m)	6 ft 2 in (1.88 m)	4.46 s	1.51 s	2.53 s	4.07 s	6.92 s	37.0 in (0.94 m)	10 ft 1 in (3.07 m)	27 reps
All values from NFL Combine/Pro Day

=== Indianapolis Colts ===
Carter was selected by the Indianapolis Colts with 119th overall pick in the 2011 NFL draft. Prior to the draft, he was considered one of the better running back prospects for the 2011 NFL draft. During his rookie season, he rushed 101 times for 377 yards, and two touchdowns.

=== Baltimore Ravens ===
On August 21, 2013, the Colts traded Carter to the Baltimore Ravens in exchange for wide receiver David Reed. He was cut by the Ravens on August 30.

=== Jacksonville Jaguars ===
Carter was signed by the Jacksonville Jaguars on December 9, 2013. He was released by Jacksonville on May 12, 2014.
