= Marlon Lucky =

American football player (born 1986)

No. 30, 24, 15
- Position: Running back

Personal information
- Born: February 28, 1986 (age 40); Hawthorne, California, U.S.
- Listed height: 5 ft 11 in (1.80 m)
- Listed weight: 218 lb (99 kg)

Career information
- High school: North Hollywood (Los Angeles)
- College: Nebraska
- NFL draft: 2009: undrafted

Career history
- Cincinnati Bengals (2009)*; New York Sentinels (2009); Omaha Nighthawks (2011); Omaha Beef (2011); Lincoln Haymakers (2013); Sioux City Bandits (2013)
- * Offseason or practice squad member only

Awards and highlights
- 2× Second-team All-Big 12 (2006, 2007)

Marlon Lucky (born February 28, 1986) is an American former professional football player who was a running back in the National Football League (NFL). He played college football for the Nebraska Cornhuskersnand was signed by the Cincinnati Bengals as an undrafted free agent in 2009.

== Early life ==
Lucky lived in Dallas, Texas through seventh grade before moving to Los Angeles, California. He attended North Hollywood High School, leaving with 4,881 rushing yards and 88 touchdowns, including 2,036 yards and 40 touchdowns in his senior year. His performance earned him selection as the most valuable player in his league and first-team CalHi Sports all-state honors. In 2009 Lucky returned to North Hollywood High School and talked to the former JV football players.

== College career ==
Coming out of high school, Lucky was one of the nation's most sought-after prospects in 2005. Rivals.com ranked him as the second best running back in the country. He ultimately decided to play for Nebraska, over USC, Washington, and others.

During his freshman season, he was a backup to senior Cory Ross, rushing for only 129 yards on 43 carries. Most of his success came on special teams. During his sophomore season in 2006, Lucky was part of Nebraska's four-man rotation at I-back that helped rush for 2,400 yards and 26 touchdowns. He finished the season with 728 rushing yards, 383 receiving yards, and 6 rushing touchdowns, earning Second-team All-Big 12 honors. In 2007, as a junior, Lucky became the Cornhuskers' main back, rushing for 1,019 yards and nine touchdowns while also catching a school-record 75 passes for 705 yards and three touchdowns.

Lucky considered entering the 2008 NFL draft, but ultimately decided against it. As a senior in 2008, Lucky battled through injuries finishing with only 517 yards on 125 carries, 26 receptions for 288 yards and eight total touchdowns. He finished his college career with 2,393 rushing yards on 515 carries and 22 touchdowns. He also added 1,379 receiving yards on 135 receptions and four touchdowns. After the 2008 regular season ended, Lucky played in the 2009 Gator Bowl and the 2009 East–West Shrine Game; he was the offensive MVP of the latter game.

== Professional career ==
=== Cincinnati Bengals ===
Lucky was signed by the Cincinnati Bengals as an undrafted free agent in 2009. He was waived on August 22.

=== New York Sentinels ===
Lucky was signed by the New York Sentinels of the United Football League on November 7, 2009. He tried out for the New York Jets shortly after the 2010 NFL draft.

=== Omaha Nighthawks ===
Lucky was signed by the Omaha Nighthawks on July 15, 2011.
