= Trey Dean =

American football player (born 2000)

Profile
- Position: Safety

Personal information
- Born: February 29, 2000 (age 26); Hampton, Georgia, U.S.
- Listed height: 6 ft 2 in (1.88 m)
- Listed weight: 201 lb (91 kg)

Career information
- High school: Dutchtown (Hampton)
- College: Florida (2018–2022)
- NFL draft: 2023: undrafted

Career history
- New York Jets (2023)*; Kansas City Chiefs (2023–2024)*; Cleveland Browns (2024–2025)*; DC Defenders (2025); Louisville Kings (2026); St. Louis Battlehawks (2026); Green Bay Packers (2026)*
- * Offseason or practice squad member only

Awards and highlights
- Super Bowl champion (LVIII); UFL champion (2025)
- Stats at Pro Football Reference

Trey Dean III (born February 29, 2000) is an American professional football safety. He played college football for the Florida Gators.

== Early life ==
Dean grew up in Hampton, Georgia, and attended Dutchtown High School. In his high school career he had 45 tackles, one going for a loss, four interceptions, ten pass deflections, and a fumble recovery. On offense he added two receptions for 28 yards. On December 20, 2017, Dean committed to play college football at the University of Florida, over other schools such as Alabama, and Kentucky.

== College career ==
Dean played for five years at Florida and tallied 255 tackles, 13.5 going for loss, four.5 sacks, four interceptions, 18 pass deflections, three fumble recoveries, and a forced fumble. Dean had a stellar freshman year putting up 26 tackles, 0.5 going for a loss, an interception, and five pass deflections. For his performance on the year he was named to the SEC-All Freshman-Team. Dean's best season came in 2021 where he put up 88 tackles, four going for a loss, a sack, an interception, and eight pass deflections. After the conclusion of the 2022 season, Dean was invited to compete in the 2023 East-West Shrine Bowl. Dean was named the Shrine Bowl defensive MVP after picking off a pass and returning it for 16 yards.

== Professional career ==
Pre-draft measurables
Height	Weight	Arm length	Hand span	Wingspan	40-yard dash	10-yard split	20-yard split	20-yard shuttle	Three-cone drill	Vertical jump	Broad jump	Bench press
6 ft 2 1/8 in (1.88 m)	200 lb (91 kg)	31 3/4 in (0.81 m)	9 1/4 in (0.23 m)	6 ft 4 5/8 in (1.95 m)	4.68 s	1.68 s	2.70 s	4.26 s	6.69 s	36.5 in (0.93 m)	10 ft 4 in (3.15 m)	25 reps
All values from NFL Combine/Pro Day

=== New York Jets ===
After not being selected in the 2023 NFL draft, Dean signed with the New York Jets as an undrafted free agent. He was waived on August 29, 2023, and re-signed to the practice squad. He was not signed to a reserve/future contract after the season and thus became a free agent upon the expiration of his practice squad contract.

=== Kansas City Chiefs ===
On January 17, 2024, Dean was signed to the Kansas City Chiefs' practice squad. Dean won his first Super Bowl when the Chiefs defeated the San Francisco 49ers in Super Bowl LVIII. On February 14, Dean signed a reserve/futures contract with Kansas City. He was waived by the Chiefs on July 22.

=== Cleveland Browns ===
On October 9, 2024, Dean was signed to the Cleveland Browns' practice squad. He signed a reserve/future contract with Cleveland on January 6, 2025. On May 12, Dean was waived by the Browns.

=== DC Defenders ===
On May 21, 2025, Dean signed with the DC Defenders of the United Football League (UFL). He was released by the Defenders on February 23, 2026.

=== Louisville Kings ===
On April 1, 2026, Dean signed with the Louisville Kings of the United Football League (UFL). He was released by Louisville on April 14.

=== St. Louis Battlehawks ===
On April 21, 2026, Dean signed with the St. Louis Battlehawks of the United Football League (UFL).

=== Green Bay Packers ===
On August 11, 2026, Dean signed with the Green Bay Packers. He was waived by the Packers as a part of final roster cuts on August 30.

== Personal life ==
Dean is the cousin of former NFL safety Ahmad Black.
