= James Wyche =

American football player (born 1982)

No. 57, 76
- Position: Defensive end

Personal information
- Born: April 19, 1982 (age 44); Roosevelt, New York, U.S.
- Listed height: 6 ft 5 in (1.96 m)
- Listed weight: 262 lb (119 kg)

Career information
- High school: Roosevelt
- College: Syracuse
- NFL draft: 2006: 7th round, 213th overall pick

Career history
- Jacksonville Jaguars (2006–2009); St. Louis Rams (2009); Houston Texans (2010)*; Seattle Seahawks (2010)*
- * Offseason or practice squad member only

Career NFL statistics
- Total tackles: 1
- Stats at Pro Football Reference

James Joseph Wyche (born April 19, 1982) is an American former professional football player who was a defensive end in the National Football League (NFL). He was selected by the Jacksonville Jaguars in the seventh round of the 2006 NFL draft. He played college football for the Syracuse Orange.

Wyche was also a member of the St. Louis Rams, Houston Texans, and Seattle Seahawks.

== Early life ==
Wyche attended Roosevelt High School, and was All-state and Newsday All-Long Island selection. He finished career with 162 tackles, 34 sacks, two blocked punts and two interceptions as a two-year starter. He played tight end as a senior and recorded 11 receptions for 372 yards and six touchdowns.

== College career ==
Wyche, four-year starter, attended Syracuse University and played for the Syracuse Orange football, while with the Orange he had a total of 136 tackles, 69 assists, 13.5 sacks, 5 forced fumbles. He started all 11 games as a senior and made 58 tackles and led team with four forced fumbles. He totaled 68 tackles and 5.5 sacks as a junior. As a sophomore, he started all 12 games and finished with 37 tackles, four tackles for loss and two sacks. He played in nine games as a redshirt freshman and made 40 tackles, 4.5 tackles for loss and 1.5 sacks. He earned a degree in child family studies.

Wyche wore #90 as a member of the Orange.

== Professional career ==
Pre-draft measurables
Height	Weight	Arm length	Hand span	40-yard dash	10-yard split	20-yard split	20-yard shuttle	Three-cone drill	Vertical jump	Broad jump	Bench press
6 ft 5 3/8 in (1.97 m)	262 lb (119 kg)	34 in (0.86 m)	9 7/8 in (0.25 m)	4.65 s	1.61 s	2.75 s	4.51 s	7.75 s	33 in (0.84 m)	9 ft 8 in (2.95 m)	27 reps
All values from NFL Combine

=== Jacksonville Jaguars ===
Wyche was selected by the Jacksonville Jaguars in the seventh round with the 213th pick of the 2006 NFL draft. In 2006, he spent first 10 weeks on practice squad before being activated to 53-man roster on November 15, 2006. On September 1, 2007, Wyche was placed on the injured reserve with a groin injury. In 2008, he missed the entire season with a knee injury suffered in the preseason and was placed on injured reserve on August 9, 2008.

Wyche was waived on September 17, 2009, and was re-signed to the practice squad on November 24. On December 3, he was promoted to the active roster. He made his NFL debut ten days later, recording one tackle against the Miami Dolphins. Wyche was waived again on December 19.

=== St. Louis Rams ===
Wyche was claimed off waivers by the St. Louis Rams on December 21, 2009. Wyche was released by the Rams on June 29, 2010.

=== Houston Texans ===
Wyche signed with the Houston Texans on August 17, 2010. He was released on August 24.

=== Seattle Seahawks ===
Wyche signed with the Seattle Seahawks on August 31, 2010. He was released on September 4 and later signed to the team's practice squad. Wyche was released on November 23, 2010, from the practice squad.
