= 2012 Omaha Nighthawks season =

- Owner: Zach Nelson
- General manager: Matt Boockmeier
- Head coach: Bart Andrus
- Home stadium: TD Ameritrade Park

Results
- Record: 2–1
- Division place: 2nd
- Playoffs: TBD

The 2012 Omaha Nighthawks season was the third and final season for the United Football League franchise.

== Offseason ==
Following the 2011 season, Joe Moglia was hired as head coach at Coastal Carolina. When the 2012 UFL schedule was released on August 1, 2012, so was the confirmation that Bart Andrus would be taking over the position.

== Television broadcasting ==
For 2012, all Nighthawks games, as well as all other UFL games, were slated to be broadcast nationally on CBS Sports Network.

== Season cancellation ==
The league suspended operations in October due to funding issues,

== Personnel ==
=== Staff ===
2012 Omaha Nighthawks staff
Front office: Owner – Zach Nelson; General manager – Matt Boockmeier; Head coaches: Head coach – Bart Andrus; Assistant to the Head Coach – Don Lawrence; Offensive coaches: Offensive coordinator/wide receivers – Marcel Bellefeuille; Quarterbacks – Gene Dahlquist; Running backs – Steve Heimann; Tight ends – Robert Hunt; Offensive line – Ron Heller	Defensive coaches: Defensive coordinator/linebackers – Pete Kuharchek; Defensive line – Rex Norris; Defensive backs – Richard Kent; Defensive quality control – Mike Morand; Special teams coaches: Special teams Coordinator – Russ Purnell; Special teams Quality Control – Travis Andrus; Strength and conditioning: Head Strength and Conditioning – James Kerwin

=== Roster ===
2012 Omaha Nighthawks final roster
Quarterbacks: 17 Jason Boltus; 4 G. J. Kinne; Running backs: 32 Preston Brown; 34 John Griffin; 33 Antonio Pittman; Wide receivers: 5 Chris Davis; 10 Marcus Harris KR; 11 Cameron Kenney; 87 Aaron Pflugrad PR; 82 Antonio Robinson; 86 Terrence Toliver; 8 Derrick Townsel; Tight ends: 84 Christian Hopkins; 81 Schuylar Oordt	Offensive linemen: 73 Tray Allen G/T; 66 Terence Brown C/G; 58 Mike Caputo C; 61 Mitch Erickson G; 71 Dan Gay G; 77 Joe Gibbs T; 70 Cordaro Howard T; 74 Jarvis Jones T; 75 Gershom Jordan T; Defensive linemen: 95 Luke Black DT; 97 William Green DE; 93 Claude Harriott DE; 92 Michael Jasper DT; 91 Trey Lewis DT; 96 Frank Okam DT; 44 Jay Moore DE	Linebackers: 47 Brandon Akpunku OLB; 55 Nate Bussey OLB; 52 JoJo Dickson MLB; 50 Phillip Dillard MLB; 56 Morlon Greenwood OLB; 57 Eric McBride OLB; 51 Steve Octavien OLB; Defensive backs: 28 Dovonte Edwards CB; 26 Matt Estrada S; 38 DeMarcus Faggins CB; 1 Antonio Fenelus CB; 23 James Harrell CB; 27 Jeremy Kellem S; 30 Nick Saenz S; 20 Stuart Schweigert S; 2 Chris Smith CB; 31 Aaron Weathers CB; Special teams: 43 Scott Albritton LS; 6 Brandon Coutu K; 18 Cory Ohnesorge P	Reserve lists: Currently vacant; Rookies in italics Roster updated October 19, 2012; 50 Active, 0 Inactive

== Schedule ==
Week	Date	Opponent	Result	Record	Venue
1	September 28	at Sacramento Mountain Lions	W 24–20	1–0	Raley Field
2	October 3	at Las Vegas Locomotives	L 6–41	1–1	Sam Boyd Stadium
3	October 12	Virginia Destroyers	W 38–10	2–1	TD Ameritrade Park
4	October 17	Las Vegas Locomotives	L 26-38	2-2	TD Ameritrade Park
5	October 23	Sacramento Mountain Lions			TD Ameritrade Park
6	October 31	at Las Vegas Locomotives			Sam Boyd Stadium
7	November 9	at Virginia Destroyers			Virginia Beach Sportsplex
8	November 16	vs. Virginia Destroyers			TD Ameritrade Park

== Standings ==
United Football League
	W	L	T	PCT	PF	PA	STK
Las Vegas Locomotives	4	0	0	1.000	118	47	W4
Omaha Nighthawks	2	2	0	.500	94	109	L1
Virginia Destroyers	1	3	0	.250	70	106	L2
Sacramento Mountain Lions	1	3	0	.250	78	98	W1
