= 2012 Sacramento Mountain Lions season =

- Owner: Paul Pelosi
- General manager: Turk Schonert
- Head coach: Turk Schonert
- Home stadium: Raley Field

Results
- Record: 1–3
- Division place: T–3rd
- Playoffs: —

The 2012 Sacramento Mountain Lions season was the fourth and final season for the United Football League franchise.

== Offseason ==
In July, the Sacramento Mountain Lions were known to be considering a move to Raley Field, a baseball park in West Sacramento, California. The Mountain Lions, 2011's attendance leader, played their previous two seasons at Hornet Stadium in Sacramento. At a press conference at Raley Field on August 6, the move to West Sacramento was confirmed. Two games were played there before the league folded.

Dennis Green, who had coached the Mountain Lions since 2009, when they were the California Redwoods, did not return as head coach in 2012. On August 6, Turk Schonert was announced as the new head coach.

== Staff ==
2012 Sacramento Mountain Lions staff
Front office: Principal Owner – Paul Pelosi; Director of Football Operations – Ricky Porter; Director of Player Personnel – Bobby DePaul; Head coaches: Head Coach/General Manager – Turk Schonert; Offensive coaches: Quarterbacks – Jeff Rutledge; Running Backs – James MacPherson; Wide Receivers – Harold Jackson; Assistant Wide Receivers – Fabien Bownes; Tight Ends/Assistant Offensive Line – Ben Norton; Offensive Line – Larry Zierlein	Defensive coaches: Defensive Coordinator – Chuck Bresnahan; Defensive Line – Kerry Locklin; Linebackers – Bobby DePaul; Defensive Backs – Rick Courtright; Defensive Quality Control – Mike Clark; Special teams coaches: Special Teams Coordinator – Rick Courtright; Assistant Special Teams – Fabien Bownes

== Roster ==
2012 Sacramento Mountain Lions roster
Quarterbacks: 7 Jeff Fleming; 8 Jerrod Johnson; 11 Josh Johnson; Running backs: 44 Shawn Asiata; 20 Mike Ball; 41 Kai Brown; 30 Tyrell Sutton; 28 John David Washington; Wide receivers: 15 Aaron Brown; 80 Joe Hastings; 10 Jeremy Horne; 18 Khalil Paden; 12 Raymond Webber; 17 Demetrius Williams; Tight ends: 86 Dominique Byrd; 88 Alex Gottlieb; 43 Anthony Miller	Offensive linemen: 75 Levy Adcock T; 70 Paul Fanaika T; 63 Jason Foster G; 51 Grant Garner C; 66 Darryl Harris G; 60 Matt Spanos C; 69 Mike Tepper T; 61 Scott Wedige C; 62 Keith Williams G; Defensive linemen: 95 Ugo Chinasa DE; 93 Landon Cohen DT; 92 Antonio Coleman DE; 77 Marlon Favorite DT; 97 Anthony Jacobs DT; 98 Jamaar Jarrett DE; 90 Jason Parker DE; 99 Tydreke Powell DT; 57 Joe Sykes DE	Linebackers: 59 Derek Domino OLB; 55 Alex Hoffman-Ellis OLB; 56 Noah Keller MLB; 58 Kyle Knox OLB; 53 Darius Nall OLB; 52 Quan Sturdivant MLB; Defensive backs: 22 Emanuel Davis CB; 38 Janzen Jackson S; 33 Randy Phillips S; 37 Lionel Smith CB; 25 Curtis Taylor S; 29 Jonathan Wade CB; 26 Jeremy Ware CB; 27 Eddie Whitley S; 24 Teddy Williams CB; Special teams: 3 Spencer Lanning P; 9 Fabrizio Scaccia K; 45 Kyle Stelter LS	Reserve lists: 40 John Busing S (IR); 50 Chad Kilgore OLB (IR); 91 Myles Wade DT (IR); Rookies in italics Roster updated October 20, 2012; 53 Active, 3 Inactive

== Schedule ==
Week	Date	Opponent	Result	Record	Venue	Attendance
1	September 28	Omaha Nighthawks	L 20–24	0–1	Raley Field	8,023
2	October 5	at Virginia Destroyers	L 29–37	0–2	Virginia Beach Sportsplex	5,316
3	October 10	Las Vegas Locomotives	L 9–20	0–3	Raley Field	5,210
4	October 19	at Virginia Destroyers	W 20–17	1–3	Virginia Beach Sportsplex	
5	October 23	at Omaha Nighthawks	Canceled		TD Ameritrade Park	
6	November 2	Virginia Destroyers	Canceled		Raley Field	
7	November 7	Las Vegas Locomotives	Canceled		Raley Field	
8	November 14	Las Vegas Locomotives	Canceled		Sam Boyd Stadium	

== Standings ==
United Football League
	W	L	T	PCT	PF	PA	STK
Las Vegas Locomotives	4	0	0	1.000	118	47	W4
Omaha Nighthawks	2	2	0	.500	94	109	L1
Virginia Destroyers	1	3	0	.250	70	106	L2
Sacramento Mountain Lions	1	3	0	.250	78	98	W1
