= Trey Lewis (American football) =

American football player (born 1985)

No. 97, 91
- Position: Defensive tackle

Personal information
- Born: May 23, 1985 (age 41); Topeka, Kansas, U.S.
- Listed height: 6 ft 3 in (1.91 m)
- Listed weight: 294 lb (133 kg)

Career information
- High school: Washburn Rural (Topeka)
- College: Washburn
- NFL draft: 2007: 6th round, 185th overall pick

Career history
- Atlanta Falcons (2007–2010); Omaha Nighthawks (2012)

Awards and highlights
- All-American (2006); 3× All-MIAA (2004–2006); MIAA Defensive MVP (2006)

Career NFL statistics
- Total tackles: 31
- Pass deflections: 1
- Interceptions: 1
- Stats at Pro Football Reference

Trey Lewis (born May 23, 1985) is an American former professional football player who was a defensive tackle for the Atlanta Falcons of the National Football League (NFL). He played college football for the Washburn Ichabods. He was selected by the Atlanta Falcons in the sixth round of the 2007 NFL draft.

After being drafted as the 185th overall pick in the draft, Lewis moved his way up the depth chart to become a starter in week 4 (September 30, 2007). He played until Week 11, when he tore his anterior cruciate ligament (ACL) and was later placed on the Falcons' injured reserve list. He recovered, but in March 2008 tore his ACL again when he fell down the stairs. He spent the 2008 season on injured reserve after not recovering from knee surgery.

== Early life ==
Lewis was born in Topeka, Kansas. He attended Washburn Rural High School in Topeka, where he played football. He was an honorable mention all-Class 6A, second-team all-City and all-Centennial League and was named the team's defensive MVP. In 2003, he achieved the rank of Eagle Scout in Boy Scouts.

== College career ==
In 2003, as a freshman, Lewis played in all 11 games, recording 18 tackles including six solo stops and two tackles for loss with 1 sack.

He was named second team all-MIAA after collecting 31 tackles including three for loss with a forced fumble, fumble recovery, a sack, and blocked punt in 2004.

Lewis was selected as a first team all-MIAA pick after recording 45 tackles including eight for loss with a forced fumble and a fumble recovery, had 4 sacks, 8 tackles for loss in 2005. In a game against Northwest Missouri, he had 3 sacks for -27 yards en route to MIAA Player of the Week honors. Lewis was a third team all-Football Gazette selection that same year.

In 2006, Lewis' final year as an Ichabod, he became the first Ichabod to be named to the Associated Press Little All-American team since 1963. He was also named to the American Football Coaches Association All-American (AFCAAA) team – becoming the first Ichabod player and only the second Ichabod overall to be named to the coaches team since 1988. Lewis recorded 62 tackles as a senior season with 36 solo stops while he recorded 10 tackles for loss and four sacks for 25 yards. He also had a forced fumble with two pass break ups and a blocked field goal attempt. Lewis gained MIAA's Most Valuable Defensive Player honors in that same week. He was named a Daktronics first team All-Southwest Region pick and a unanimous first team All-MIAA selection. Lewis also played in the first Texas vs. The Nation Game on Feb. 2, 2007. He became only the sixth player in school history to be invited to a college all-star game. He was named first team All-American by the Football Gazette and second team All-American by D2football.com. Lewis finished his career at Washburn with 156 total tackles, including 68 solo stops, 23 tackles for loss and 10 sacks.

On NFLDraftScout.com, he was rated number 25 out of 148 defensive tackles, and 348 out of 2353 overall players going into the NFL draft. Results from a University combine test had Trey showing a 5.14 in the 40-yard dash, Bench-pressing 225 pounds 21 times, having a 582-pound squat, a 417-pound hang clean, a 30½-inch vertical jump, and a 9-foot broad jump.

According to Lewis, the teams that scouted him the most were the Chicago Bears, the Kansas City Chiefs, the Atlanta Falcons, and the New York Giants.

Lewis majored in computer information sciences. He returned to school in 2014 to finish his degree.

== Professional career ==
=== Atlanta Falcons ===
==== 2007 ====
Lewis was selected by the Atlanta Falcons in the sixth round, being the 185 overall pick in the 2007 NFL draft.

He is the fourth Washburn University player ever to be drafted to an NFL team, joining offensive tackle Ed Schneider, who was picked in the 17th round and the 169th overall pick by the New York Giants in 1944 and outside linebacker Troy Stedman, who was picked 170th overall by the Kansas City Chiefs in the seventh round of the 1988 NFL draft.

He's shown a lot of good things, Coming in as a rookie, he's accepting his responsibility now. With us releasing Grady (Jackson), there's going to be a big weight on his shoulders and I think he's going to take it in stride.

— Michael Boley

Lewis made his first start of the season against the Texans on September 30, 2007. Teammate Michael Boley said of Lewis starting "He's shown a lot of good things, Coming in as a rookie, he's accepting his responsibility now. With us releasing Grady, there's going to be a big weight on his shoulders and I think he's going to take it in stride." He was then listed as the Starting Defensive Tackle in week 10 after the Falcons cut veteran Grady Jackson. During training camp, his number was listed as #67, because in college, he was #76, but that number was already taken. Then his number was changed to #97 before the season began because an older falcons player had the same number as him. He finished the 2007 NFL season with 23 tackles and one interception. Because of his size, Lewis played both Defensive Tackle and Nose Tackle during the season. According To Lewis, the most hard adjustment from NCAA Division II to the NFL was working on his Technique. Around this time, Lewis lost 20 pounds and slimmed down to 294 pounds.

In November 2007, during a week 11 game against the Tampa Bay Buccaneers, Trey Lewis went down with a torn right ACL and was later placed on the Falcons' injured reserve list. He had his knee operated on to fix the torn ligament. On March 4, 2008, Lewis fell down a set of stairs and re-injured his right knee. Falcons coach Mike Smith said "It's tough for us, but it is also disappointing for Trey because he was making tremendous progress in his rehabilitation,". His Agent, Richard Katz, told reporters "He's having some surgery this week. Basically, he's lost the three months that he's been rehabbing"'. The accident was described as a "freak accident" due to the nature of the injury. Trey Lewis was inactive during mini-camp. The situation had caused the Falcons' Management to consider drafting Glenn Dorsey of LSU with the 3rd pick of the first round in the NFL draft. The Falcons instead drafted Matt Ryan of Boston College while the Kansas City Chiefs picked Dorsey with the 5th pick.

==== 2008 ====
On July 26, 2008, after not fully recovering from his torn ACL, Lewis was placed on the non-football injury list, where he remained for the rest of the season.

==== 2009 ====
The Atlanta Falcons website reported in an article that Lewis was "ready to put his knee injury behind him". The article interviews Lewis about his knee injury and his future. When asked about what he initially thought of the knee injury, he replied "I just thought I tweaked it, When you have your surgery the knee feels different every day. I just thought something was weird. I didn't know until a couple days later when I got a call with the results of the MRI. You just have to pick up the pieces and start over again." Since his injury, Lewis has been cleared to participate in organized team activities, including on-field work, but he wants to make sure he remains healthy for the rigors of the preseason. He was quotes as saying "As of right now I want to get through this offseason program and make sure everything is good," he said. "I want to get confident with my knees right now so, when training camp starts, I'm full throttle and there's no holding back whatsoever." When asked about off-season conditioning, Lewis replied: "I think I'm a lot stronger, especially in my upper body. My lower body feels stronger than it was prior to the injury. I'm excited to see what I can do now with a year of NFL lifting and training without banging on (the knee)." He competed for the starting job in the 2009 NFL season.

Lewis was inactive for the first 2 weeks, but after DT Peria Jerry was placed on Injured Reserve, Lewis was bumped up a spot on the depth chart. On September 28, 2009, against the New England Patriots, Lewis played in his first regular season NFL game since November 2007. He amassed 6 tackles.

==== 2010 ====
Lewis started in the opening game of the 2010 season against the Pittsburgh Steelers and had two tackles, but was inactive for the remainder of the season.

==== 2011 ====
Lewis signed a contract extension with the Falcons in February 2011. However, he was released by the Falcons during final cuts on September 2, 2011.

=== Omaha Nighthawks ===
After being released by the Falcons, Lewis was brought in for a workout with the Chicago Bears in May 2012, but was not signed.

Lewis then signed with the Omaha Nighthawks of the United Football League in 2012. He played in 3 games for the Nighthawks before the league folded in October. He finished with 11 tackles, a sack and a forced fumble.

=== Impact ===
Cary Williams, a Washburn defensive back who was drafted in the 7th round of the 2008 NFL draft by the Tennessee Titans, was scouted heavily by scouts coming into the NFL draft. Williams stated that if it hadn't been for Trey Lewis being scouted and drafted, he would not have had a chance at even being scouted. "Trey really opened the door for Washburn (University)," Williams said in an interview with KTKA-49 News in Topeka. KS.

== Career statistics ==
=== NFL ===
YEAR	TACKLES	SOLO	AST	SACK	FF	INT	INT YDS
2007	19	17	2	0	0	1	4
2008	0	0	0	0	0	0	0
2009	10	8	2	0	0	0	0
2010	2	0	2	0	0	0	0
Total	31	25	6	0	0	1	4

=== College ===
Year	Games	Tackles	Sacks	Force Fum.
2003	11	18	1	0
2004	12	31	1	1
2005	12	45	4	1
2006	11	62	4	1
Total	46	156	10	3

== Personal life ==
Lewis is the son of Verna Chapman and Wynn Lewis, and has one brother. Since retiring from football, he has run an auto dealership.
