= 2012 Las Vegas Locomotives season =

American football team season

- Owner: Bill Hambrecht
- General manager: Jim Fassel
- Head coach: Jim Fassel
- Home stadium: Sam Boyd Stadium

Results
- Record: 4–0
- Division place: 1st
- Playoffs: —

The 2012 Las Vegas Locomotives season was the fourth season for the United Football League franchise.

== Venue ==
For 2012, the Locomotives opened negotiations with both Sam Boyd Stadium, the team's home for its entire existence to date, and Cashman Field, a smaller baseball venue within the Las Vegas city limits. In the end, the Locos management elected to remain at Sam Boyd for the first two games of the season; the league suspended operations before the other two games could be played.

== Broadcasting ==
All 2012 Las Vegas Locomotives games (along with all other 2012 UFL games) were broadcast live nationally on CBS Sports Network. Unlike 2010 and 2011, there was no radio or Internet broadcast.

== Personnel ==
Head coach Jim Fassel returned for his fourth season with the Locomotives, which makes him the longest-tenured coach in UFL history; all three of the other original UFL coaches have since left the league.

=== Staff ===
2012 Las Vegas Locomotives staff
Front office: Owner – Bill Hambrecht; Owner – Rob Ryan; Director of football administration – Mike Fassel; Director of football operations – Chuck Shelton; Director of player personnel – Randy Ball; Head coaches: President/general manager/head coach – Jim Fassel; Offensive coaches: Quarterbacks – Eric Van Heusen; Running backs – Amp Lee; Wide receivers – Tim Rattay; Offensive line – Don Eck; Tight Ends- Mike McGlinchey Jr.; Assistant offensive line – Ben Norton	Defensive coaches: Defensive coordinator/special teams coordinator – Larry Mac Duff; Defensive line – Kevin Wolthausen; Linebackers/assistant special teams – Dennis Therrell; Secondary – Isaac Carter; Secondary – Larry Marmie; Strength and conditioning: Strength – I. J. Gorman

=== Roster ===
2012 Las Vegas Locomotives final roster
Quarterbacks: 12 Brian Brohm; 2 Chase Clement; 5 Zac Lee; Running backs: 1 DeDe Dorsey; 23 Nic Grigsby; 22 Hakim Hill; 20 Devin Moore; Wide receivers: 13 Jayson Boyd; 11 A. J. Jackson; 85 Samie Parker; 84 Titus Ryan; 81 Andrae Thurman; 83 Aaron Woods; Tight ends: 88 Spencer Havner; 82 Xavier Lee; 86 Jake Nordin; 89 Jamie Petrowski	Offensive linemen: 79 Jesse Boone C; 76 Gerald Cadogan T; 75 Tim Duckworth G; 64 Daverin Geralds G; 67 Drew Miller C/G; 77 Andrew Mitchell T; 74 SirVincent Rogers T; 72 Phil Trautwein T; 71 Mark Wilson G; Defensive linemen: 90 Adrian Awasom DE; 91 Ryan Boschetti DT; 94 Copeland Bryan DE; 92 Miguel Chavis DE; 93 Eric Foster DT; 97 Josh Mallard DE; 98 Jermaine McGhee DE; 95 Marcus Smith DT	Linebackers: 55 Brian Banks; 54 Cody Glenn; 56 Nic Harris; 52 David Herron; 57 Stanford Keglar; 58 Danny Lansanah; 59 Chase Vaughn; Defensive backs: 24 Wale Dada CB; 32 Jameel Dowling CB; 38 Marquis Floyd CB; 28 Ron Girault FS; 30 Keith Lewis FS; 34 Bret Lockett SS; 33 Cord Parks CB; 25 Joe Porter CB; 27 C. J. Wallace SS	Special teams: 8 Danny Baugher P; 50 Jake Ingram LS; 3 Clint Stitser K; Reserve lists: 51 K. C. Asiodu LB (IR); 26 Kevin Payne SS (IR); 21 Jack Williams CB (IR); rookies in italics 53 Active, 3 Inactive

== Schedule ==
Week	Date	Opponent	Result	Record	Venue	Attendance
1	September 26	Virginia Destroyers	W 19–6	1–0	Sam Boyd Stadium	2,500
2	October 3	Omaha Nighthawks	W 41–6	2–0	Sam Boyd Stadium	601
3	October 10	at Sacramento Mountain Lions	W 20–9	3–0	Raley Field	
4	October 17	at Omaha Nighthawks	W 38–26	4–0	TD Ameritrade Park	
5	October 25	at Virginia Destroyers			Virginia Beach Sportsplex	
6	October 31	Omaha Nighthawks			Sam Boyd Stadium	
7	November 7	at Sacramento Mountain Lions			Raley Field	
8	November 14	Sacramento Mountain Lions			Sam Boyd Stadium	

== Standings ==
United Football League
	W	L	T	PCT	PF	PA	STK
Las Vegas Locomotives	4	0	0	1.000	118	47	W4
Omaha Nighthawks	2	2	0	.500	94	109	L1
Virginia Destroyers	1	3	0	.250	70	106	L2
Sacramento Mountain Lions	1	3	0	.250	78	98	W1
