= 2012 Virginia Destroyers season =

American football league season

- Owner: Bill Mayer
- General manager: Kurt Schottenheimer
- Head coach: Kurt Schottenheimer
- Home stadium: Virginia Beach Sportsplex

Results
- Record: 1–3
- Division place: 3rd
- Playoffs: —

The 2012 Virginia Destroyers season was the second and final season for the United Football League franchise and the fourth in the combined history of the Destroyers and its predecessor, the Florida Tuskers.

The team, along with the rest of the league, suspended operations after week 4, with multiple players reporting that they were never paid for their services.

== Personnel ==
=== Staff ===
2012 Virginia Destroyers staff
Front office: Owner – Bill Mayer; President – John Wuehrmann; Director of player personnel – Bret Munsey; Head coaches: Head coach/general manager – Kurt Schottenheimer; Offensive coaches: Offensive coordinator/quarterbacks – Terry Shea; Running backs – Gerald Carr; Wide receivers – Bob Saunders; Offensive line – Bill Laveroni; Offensive quality control – Lance Zeno	Defensive coaches: Defensive coordinator – James Willis; Defensive line – Tim Krumrie; Linebackers – Kurt Gouveia; Defensive backs – David Gibbs; Defensive quality control – Mickey Mays; Special teams coaches: Special teams – Mike Stock; Strength and conditioning: Strength/tight ends – Chet Fuhrman; PA announcer - Henry W. Ayer III

=== Roster ===
2012 Virginia Destroyers final roster
Quarterbacks: 3 Derek Devine; 14 Chris Greisen; 8 Mike McMahon; Running backs: 29 Adrian N. Peterson; 33 Dominic Rhodes; 25 Wynel Seldon; 22 Clifton Smith; Wide receivers: -- Darvin Adams; 19 David Clowney; 84 Jonathan Holland; -- David Kircus; 88 Calvin Russell; 81 Ernest Smith; 82 John Standeford; 15 Huey Whittaker; Tight ends: 83 Cameron Graham; 89 Ben Patrick	Offensive linemen: 64 George Bussey G; 63 Ryan Cave G; 61 Stanley Daniels G; 66 Anthony Davis G; 58 Paul Fenaroli C; 77 Chris Patrick T; 65 Jose Valdez T; 76 Thomas Welch T; Defensive linemen: 69 Christian Anthony DE; 68 McKinley Boykin DT; 92 Marcus Harrison DT; 59 Larry Hart DE; 91 Eric Norwood DE; 94 Stylez G. White DE; 99 Claude Wroten DT	Linebackers: 54 Lee Campbell MLB; 52 Savion Frazier OLB; 53 Neal Howey MLB; 55 Terrence Melton OLB; 56 Kerry Neal OLB; 50 Tony Taylor OLB; -- Jake Trantin OLB; Defensive backs: 21 Antareis Bryan CB; 23 Jerome Carter FS; 31 Cletis Gordon CB; 45 Michael Hamlin SS; 27 Reggie Jones CB; 26 Aaron Rouse SS; 24 Darius Vinnett CB; 35 Kyle Whitehurst CB; Special teams: 4 Brett Bowden P; 57 Clint Mower LS; 1 Kenny Spencer K	Reserve lists: -- Anthony Hill TE (IR); 93 Mark Robinson DT (IR); 96 Kiante Tripp DT (IR); 28 Torri Williams SS (IR); 39 DeAngelo Willingham CB/FS (IR); Rookies in italics Roster updated October 19, 2012; 50 Active, 5 Inactive

== Schedule ==
Week	Date	Opponent	Result	Record	Venue	Attendance
1	September 26	at Las Vegas Locomotives	L 6–19	0–1	Sam Boyd Stadium	2,500
2	October 5	Sacramento Mountain Lions	W 37–29	1–1	Virginia Beach Sportsplex	5,316
3	October 12	at Omaha Nighthawks	L 10–38	1–2	TD Ameritrade Park	
4	October 19	Sacramento Mountain Lions	L 17–20	1–3	Virginia Beach Sportsplex	
5	October 26	Las Vegas Locomotives	Canceled		Virginia Beach Sportsplex	
6	November 2	at Sacramento Mountain Lions	Canceled		Raley Field	
7	November 9	Omaha Nighthawks	Canceled		Virginia Beach Sportsplex	
8	November 14	vs. Omaha Nighthawks	Canceled		TD Ameritrade Park	

== Standings ==
United Football League
	W	L	T	PCT	PF	PA	STK
Las Vegas Locomotives	4	0	0	1.000	118	47	W4
Omaha Nighthawks	2	2	0	.500	94	109	L1
Virginia Destroyers	1	3	0	.250	70	106	L2
Sacramento Mountain Lions	1	3	0	.250	78	98	W1
