= List of Washburn Ichabods in the NFL draft =

The Washburn Ichabods football team, representing Washburn University, has had 5 players selected in the National Football League (NFL) since the league began holding drafts in 1936). This includes two players selected in the last decade. The New York Giants lead all NFL teams by drafting three Ichabods.

Each NFL franchise seeks to add new players through the annual NFL Draft. The draft rules were last updated in 2009. The team with the worst record from the previous year picks first, the next-worst team second, and so on. Teams that did not make the playoffs are ordered by their regular-season record with any remaining ties broken by strength of schedule. Playoff participants are sequenced after non-playoff teams, based on their round of elimination (wild card, division, conference, and Super Bowl).

== Key ==
B	Back	K	Kicker	NT	Nose tackle
C	Center	LB	Linebacker	FB	Fullback
DB	Defensive back	P	Punter	HB	Halfback
DE	Defensive end	QB	Quarterback	WR	Wide receiver
DT	Defensive tackle	RB	Running back	G	Guard
E	End	T	Offensive tackle	TE	Tight end

*	Selected to a Pro Bowl
†	Won an NFL championship
‡	Selected to a Pro Bowl and won an NFL championship

== Players selected ==
Year	Round	Pick	Player name	Team	Position	Notes
1944	17	169	Ed Schnieder	New York Giants	T	—
1954	25	292	Bill Baker	New York Giants	B	—
1988	7	170	Troy Stedman	Kansas City Chiefs	LB	—
2007	6	185	Trey Lewis	Atlanta Falcons	DT	—
2008	7	229	Cary Williams	Tennessee Titans	CB	—
2019	6	180	Corey Ballentine	New York Giants	CB	—
2020	7	253	Kyle Hinton	Minnesota Vikings	G	—
