= Schuylar Oordt =

American football player (born 1987)

No. 42, 85, 86, 81
- Position: Tight end

Personal information
- Born: May 26, 1987 (age 39); Waterloo, Iowa, U.S.
- Listed height: 6 ft 7 in (2.01 m)
- Listed weight: 261 lb (118 kg)

Career information
- College: Northern Iowa
- NFL draft: 2011: undrafted

Career history
- St. Louis Rams (2011)*; Jacksonville Jaguars (2011)*; Washington Redskins (2011)*; Omaha Nighthawks (2012)
- * Offseason or practice squad member only
- Stats at Pro Football Reference

Schuylar Oordt (born May 26, 1987) is an American former football tight end. He was signed by the St. Louis Rams as an undrafted free agent in 2011. He played college football at University of Northern Iowa.

He was also a member of the Jacksonville Jaguars, Washington Redskins and Omaha Nighthawks.

== Professional career ==
=== St. Louis Rams ===
Oordt signed with the St. Louis Rams on July 29, 2011. He was waived on August 28.

=== Jacksonville Jaguars ===
He was signed to the Jacksonville Jaguars' practice squad on October 12, 2011. He released from the practice squad on November 14.

=== Washington Redskins ===
The Washington Redskins signed him to their practice squad on December 20, 2011. He was let go after the season.

=== Carolina Panthers ===
On May 11, 2012, he went to Rookie minicamp with the Carolina Panthers, but was not signed.
