= Nick Saenz =

American football player (born 1990)

No. 30
- Position: Safety

Personal information
- Born: February 23, 1990 (age 36); Houston, Texas, U.S.
- Listed height: 6 ft 0 in (1.83 m)
- Listed weight: 195 lb (88 kg)

Career information
- High school: Pearland (TX)
- College: Houston
- NFL draft: 2012: undrafted

Career history
- Buffalo Bills (2012)*; Omaha Nighthawks (2012); Tampa Bay Buccaneers (2012–2013)*
- * Offseason or practice squad member only
- Stats at Pro Football Reference

Nick Saenz (born February 23, 1990) is an American former football safety.

== Professional career ==
=== Tampa Bay Buccaneers ===
Saenz was signed to the Tampa Bay Buccaneers practice squad on December 26, 2012. On November 5, 2013, Saenz was waived by the Tampa Bay Buccaneers.

=== Omaha Knighthawks ===
Saenz was signed by the Omaha Knighthawks of the United Football League on September 14, 2012. Saenz earned a starting position at safety for the Knighthawks. The United football league folded and was dissolved October 22, 2012.

=== Buffalo Bills ===
Saenz was signed by the Buffalo Bills on May 14, 2012. Saenz was invited to the Buffalo Bills rookie mini camp as a tryout player. He impressed the coaches and general manager during the 5 practices over 3 days. He was signed at the end of the camp to the roster leading into training camp. Saenz made it to the final cuts of the roster leading into the regular season on August 30, 2012.

== Collegiate career ==
Saenz received a full ride to the University of Houston in 2008. During his career with the Cougars, he started 45 games, had 248 tackles, 14 pass deflections and five interceptions. His 107 yards, extra point return against Southern Mississippi was voted as number one by ESPN's Play of the Week. Leading up to the 2012 NFL draft Saenz ran a 4.46 forty yard dash (fastest forty at UH pro day) and did 16 reps of 225 pounds.
