= Reggie Jones (cornerback, born 1986) =

American football player (born 1986)

No. 35, 29, 20, 31, 27
- Position: Cornerback

Personal information
- Born: March 15, 1986 (age 40); Bellevue, Washington, U.S.
- Listed height: 6 ft 0 in (1.83 m)
- Listed weight: 200 lb (91 kg)

Career information
- College: Idaho; Portland State
- NFL draft: 2009: undrafted

Career history
- New Orleans Saints (2009); Washington Redskins (2010); Virginia Destroyers (2011); Minnesota Vikings (2011–2012)*; Virginia Destroyers (2012); Dallas Cowboys (2012)*; Calgary Stampeders (2013); Ottawa Redblacks (2014)
- * Offseason or practice squad member only

Awards and highlights
- Super Bowl champion (XLIV); UFL champion (2011)
- Stats at Pro Football Reference
- Stats at CFL.ca (archive)

Reggie Jones (born March 15, 1986) is an American former professional football cornerback. He played college football at Portland State University and the University of Idaho.

== Professional career ==
=== New Orleans Saints ===
Jones was originally signed as a free agent by the New Orleans Saints on April 8, 2009. Though he tore his Achilles tendon during the season, he was a part of the 2009 Super Bowl Championship team. He recovered from his injury and the next year made the Saints practice roster.

=== Washington Redskins ===
The Washington Redskins claimed Jones off the Saints practice roster promoting him to the active roster on December 29, 2010. He was released by the Redskins on September 4, 2011.

=== Virginia Destroyers ===
Released after final cuts, Jones played in the UFL for the Virginia Destroyers, where he started as a cornerback and won a UFL Championship under coach Marty Schottenheimer.

=== Dallas Cowboys ===
Jones was signed to the Dallas Cowboys' in November 2012.

=== Ottawa Redblacks ===
Jones signed with the Ottawa Redblacks on January 14, 2014. He was the starting cornerback. He was released by the Redblacks on September 6, 2014.

== Other work ==
Outside of his playing career, Jones leads one of the top youth football programs in the country "Heir Academy" ( HeirSports.com ). Hundreds of collegiate athletes have gone through the Heir Academy program based in Puyallup, WA. The youth tackle program has also been successful, boasting an American Youth Football Conference D1 National Championship. Jones is also a public speaker. On his "Believe Beyond Tour", he appeared in over 50 schools throughout the United States and Canada. He has been highlighted at national youth conferences, leadership conferences, assemblies, youth rallies, and church services. He was featured on the 2014 NSOG (Nothing Short of Greatness) Tour with speaker Trent Shelton. He was the keynote speaker at the youth conference WeDay and the National Youth At-Risk Conference in Savannah, Georgia.

Jones is the Owner and Founder of Heir Football Academy, an instructional program in the state of Washington. This is a nationally ranked program, with many of its members receiving scholarship offers at universities around the country. The platform is designed to meet the needs of position and scheme-specific instruction, as well individual, group, and team training. Instructors are former NFL and NCAA Football players giving back in a physical and mental capacity.

Jones is founder, president, and director of the mentoring program Showtime For Stars, a mentoring program for student athletes. The foundation is supported by various businesses and former professional and collegiate athletes serving as mentors to youth (ages 12–18).

In May 2014, Showtime For Stars put on the 1st Annual Showtime For Stars Golf Tournament, held at the New Castle Golf Club in New Castle, Washington. The same month, the group held the Showtime For Stars Football Skills Camp in Kent, Washington. NFL athletes from various teams served as coaches and guest speakers. Over 300 participants attended from Washington, California, and Oregon.
