= Matt Estrada =

American gridiron football player (born 1988)

No. 5, 26
- Position: Safety

Personal information
- Born: October 20, 1988 (age 38); La Habra, California, U.S.
- Listed height: 5 ft 10 in (1.78 m)
- Listed weight: 196 lb (89 kg)

Career information
- College: Northern Arizona
- NFL draft: 2011: undrafted

Career history
- Jacksonville Jaguars (2011)*; Toronto Argonauts (2012)*; Omaha Nighthawks (2012); Los Angeles KISS (2014)
- * Offseason or practice squad member only

Career AFL statistics
- Total tackles: 28
- Sacks: 0.5
- Interceptions: 2
- Stats at ArenaFan.com
- Stats at Pro Football Reference

Matthew Joshua Estrada (born October 20, 1988) is an American former football safety. Estrada was most recently a member of the Toronto Argonauts of the Canadian Football League (CFL). He was signed by the Jacksonville Jaguars as an undrafted free agent in 2011. He played college football at Northern Arizona.

== Professional career ==
High School: A 2006 graduate of La Habra High School. Freeway League most valuable player. Division 9 Defensive Player of the Year. Chosen for all-state second-team. Recorded 119 tackles with four interceptions and four punt blocks. Played in the North-South Orange County All-Star game, earning North MVP honors. Also lettered in baseball, hitting .412 with a 35-game hit streak.

College Career: 2009: All-Big Sky first-team selection safety. Named most valuable defensive player, defensive backfield player of the year and outstanding junior at team banquet. Team captain. Started 10 games. Led the team with 78 tackles with a team-best 47 solo tackles. Ranked 15th in the Big Sky in tackles. Recorded at least seven tackles in six games and had 10 or more three times. Had a season-high 12 tackles at Sacramento State. Sat out final game due to Big Sky suspension. 2008: Saw action in 11 games. Tied for seventh on the team with 33 tackles. Recorded 2.5 sacks and four pass deflections. Had a season-high six tackles against Montana State. Had four or more tackles five times. Prior to NAU: Transfer from Fullerton Junior College. Played 2007 season for Gene Murphy. Named All-Mission second-team. Recorded 65 tackles with three interceptions with two kickoff returns for touchdowns. Redshirted 2006 season at Idaho under Dennis Erickson.

=== NFL ===
Estrada spent 13 weeks on the practice squad of the Jacksonville Jaguars of the National Football League.

=== CFL ===
On March 29, 2012, Matt Estrada signed with the Toronto Argonauts of the Canadian Football League. On June 20, 2012, Estrada was released by the Argonauts.

=== UFL ===
Played for the Omaha Nighthawks.

=== Los Angeles Kiss ===
On April 16, 2014, Estrada was assigned to the Los Angeles Kiss of the Arena Football League (AFL) but was quickly released due to injury.
