= DeAngelo Willingham =

American football player (born 1987)

No. 39
- Position: Cornerback

Personal information
- Born: January 15, 1987 (age 39); Calhoun County, South Carolina, U.S.
- Listed height: 6 ft 0 in (1.83 m)
- Listed weight: 200 lb (91 kg)

Career information
- College: Tennessee
- NFL draft: 2009: undrafted

Career history
- Tampa Bay Buccaneers (2009)*; Dallas Cowboys (2009)*; New England Patriots (2009)*; Seattle Seahawks (2009–2010)*; Cincinnati Bengals (2010)*; New England Patriots (2010)*; Virginia Destroyers (2011–2012)
- * Offseason or practice squad member only

Awards and highlights
- UFL champion (2011)
- Stats at Pro Football Reference

DeAngelo Lamond Willingham (born January 15, 1987) is an American former football cornerback for the Virginia Destroyers of the United Football League (UFL). He was signed by the Tampa Bay Buccaneers as an undrafted free agent in 2009. He played college football at Tennessee.

Willingham was also a member of the Dallas Cowboys, Seattle Seahawks, Cincinnati Bengals, and New England Patriots.

== Early life ==
Willingham attended Calhoun County High School in St. Matthews, South Carolina, where he was a three-year starter at defensive back, wide receiver, and kick returner. He was a PrepStar All-American selection in 2004. He also played basketball, where he was a three-year starter at guard. In track and field, Willingham was a regional finalist in the 4 × 100 meter relay.

== College career ==
=== Junior college ===
Following high school, Willingham attended the College of the Desert in Palm Desert, California, where he was a two-year starter at cornerback. He was a two-time all-conference selection. As a freshman, he had three interceptions, while as a sophomore he had five interceptions and one forced fumble.

=== University of Tennessee ===
After junior college, Willingham attended the University of Tennessee. In 2007, he started eight games, recording 38 tackles. As a senior in 2008, he started 10 games and had three interceptions.

== Professional career ==
=== Tampa Bay Buccaneers ===
After going undrafted in the 2009 NFL draft, Willingham signed with the Tampa Bay Buccaneers. He was waived by the team on August 29, 2009.

=== Dallas Cowboys ===
Willingham was claimed off waivers by the Dallas Cowboys on August 30, 2009; however, he was waived during the team's final cuts six days later.

=== New England Patriots ===
On September 6, 2009, Willingham was signed to the practice squad of the New England Patriots. He was released on September 21, 2009.

=== Seattle Seahawks ===
On November 3, 2009, the Seattle Seahawks signed Willingham to their practice squad, where he spent the remainder of the season. He was re-signed to a future contract on January 6, 2010, but was waived by the team on April 28, 2010.

=== Cincinnati Bengals ===
Willingham was claimed off waivers by the Cincinnati Bengals on April 29, 2010. He was later waived on June 18, 2010.

=== New England Patriots (second stint) ===
Willingham was signed again by the Patriots on August 9, 2010. He was waived during final cuts on September 4, 2010.
