= Jeremy Kellem =

American football player (born 1989)

No. 20, 27
- Position: Defensive back

Personal information
- Born: June 6, 1989 (age 37)
- Listed height: 5 ft 10 in (1.78 m)
- Listed weight: 195 lb (88 kg)

Career information
- High school: Deerfield Beach (Deerfield Beach, Florida)
- College: Middle Tennessee State
- NFL draft: 2011: undrafted

Career history
- New Orleans VooDoo (2011–2012); Omaha Nighthawks (2012); Arizona Rattlers (2012–2016)

Awards and highlights
- 2× ArenaBowl champion (2013, 2014); AFL Defensive Back of the Year (2015); First-team All-Arena (2015); Second-team All-Arena (2012); 2× First-team All-Sun Belt (2009, 2010); Second-team All-Sun Belt (2008)

Career AFL statistics
- Total tackles: 410.5
- Pass deflections: 111
- Interceptions: 38
- Stats at ArenaFan.com

Jeremy Kellem (born June 6, 1989) is an American former professional football defensive back who played in the Arena Football League (AFL) for the New Orleans VooDoo and Arizona Rattlers, and in the United Football League (UFL) for the Omaha Nighthawks. He played college football at Middle Tennessee State University.

== Early life and college ==
Kellem attended Deerfield Beach High School in Deerfield Beach, Florida.

Kellem played from 2007 to 2010 with the Middle Tennessee Blue Raiders. He was named First-Team All-Sun Belt as a junior and senior. He was also named to the ESPN Academic All-American team. Kellem finished his college career with 286 total tackles, six sacks and ten interceptions, two of which were returned for touchdowns.

== Professional career ==
Kellem was signed by the New Orleans VooDoo on October 21, 2011. He was named second-team All-Arena as a rookie in 2012 after recording 95.5 total tackles and eight interceptions.

Kellem spent the 2012 season with the Omaha Nighthawks of the United Football League.

Kellem signed with the Arizona Rattlers on November 8, 2012. He was a member of the Rattlers teams that won ArenaBowl XXVI and ArenaBowl XXVII. He earned first-team All-Arena honors in 2015 after recording 95.5 total tackles and fourteen interceptions. Kellem was also named AFL Defensive Back of the Year in 2015.
