= Mitch Erickson =

American gridiron football player (born 1985)

No. 66, 61
- Position: Guard

Personal information
- Born: May 14, 1985 (age 41); Hutchinson, Minnesota, U.S.
- Listed height: 6 ft 6 in (1.98 m)
- Listed weight: 290 lb (132 kg)

Career information
- College: South Dakota State
- NFL draft: 2008: undrafted

Career history
- Denver Broncos (2008–2010)*; Seattle Seahawks (2010)*; Omaha Nighthawks (2010–2012); Edmonton Eskimos (2012)*
- * Offseason or practice squad member only

Awards and highlights
- First-team All-American (2007); 3× First-team All-GWFC (2005-2007)

Mitch Erickson (born May 14, 1985) is an American former professional football player who was a guard in the National Football League (NFL). He played college football for the South Dakota State Jackrabbits. He was signed by the Denver Broncos as an undrafted free agent in 2008.

Erickson was also been a member of the NFL's Seattle Seahawks.

== College career ==
Erickson played for the South Dakota State Jackrabbits from 2004 to 2007. In 2006, Erickson was named the Associated Press All-America Third-team. He was named to the AFCA Division I Football Championship Subdivision Coaches' All-America Team, the Associated Press FCS All-America Team in 2007.

== Professional career ==
=== Denver Broncos ===
The Denver Broncos signed Erickson to a free agent contract on April 29, 2008. On August 31, 2008, Erickson was signed to the Broncos practice squad. Erickson was signed to a reserve futures contract on January 5, 2010.

=== Seattle Seahawks ===
Erickson signed with the Seattle Seahawks on April 16, 2010. He was released on September 4.

=== Omaha Nighthawks ===
Erickson was signed by the Omaha Nighthawks of the United Football League on September 11, 2010. He re-signed with the team on June 29, 2011.

=== Edmonton Eskimos ===
Erickson signed with the Edmonton Eskimos on January 16, 2012, and was released on June 23, 2012.
