= Terence Brown (American football) =

American football player (born 1986)

No. 60, 66
- Position: Offensive guard/Center

Personal information
- Born: February 19, 1986 (age 40); American Fork, Utah, U.S.
- Listed height: 6 ft 4 in (1.93 m)
- Listed weight: 303 lb (137 kg)

Career information
- College: BYU
- NFL draft: 2012: undrafted

Career history
- Miami Dolphins (2012)*; Omaha Nighthawks (2012)
- * Offseason or practice squad member only

Terence Brown (born February 19, 1986) is an American former football offensive guard/center. He attended Brigham Young University and went undrafted in the 2012 NFL draft and was signed by the Miami Dolphins. Brown was cut on June 11, 2012 to make room for the Dolphins' signing of Chad Johnson.

== Early life ==
Brown attended Summerville High School in Summerville, South Carolina, where he was a two-time all-state offensive lineman. In his Senior season Brown was a Mr South Carolina football finalists.

== College career ==
After lettering his freshman season Brown spent 2 years on a Church mission in Brazil, Brown returned joined the BYU Cougars varsity in 2009. He started all 13 games in 2009, 2010 & 2011 playing a variety of positions on the offense line.

== Professional career ==
=== Miami Dolphins ===
He signed with the Miami Dolphins as a Undrafted free agent.
