= Nate Bussey =

American gridiron football player (born 1989)

No. 59, 61, 6, 55
- Position: Linebacker

Personal information
- Born: February 20, 1989 (age 37); Washington, D.C., U.S.
- Listed height: 6 ft 2 in (1.88 m)
- Listed weight: 220 lb (100 kg)

Career information
- High school: Dunbar (Washington, D.C.)
- College: Illinois
- NFL draft: 2011: 7th round, 243rd overall pick

Career history
- New Orleans Saints (2011−2012); Jacksonville Jaguars (2012)*; Omaha Nighthawks (2012); Hamilton Tiger-Cats (2013)
- * Offseason or practice squad member only
- Stats at Pro Football Reference
- Stats at CFL.ca (archive)

Nathan Lee Bussey (born February 20, 1989) is an American former professional football linebacker. He was selected by the New Orleans Saints in the seventh round of the 2011 NFL draft. He played college football at Illinois. He was also a member of the Jacksonville Jaguars, Omaha Nighthawks and Hamilton Tiger-Cats.

== Professional career ==
Pre-draft measurables
Height	Weight	40-yard dash	10-yard split	20-yard split	20-yard shuttle	Three-cone drill	Vertical jump	Broad jump	Bench press
6 ft 1 in (1.85 m)	228 lb (103 kg)	4.51 s	1.51 s	2.68 s	4.28 s	6.84 s	35.5 in (0.90 m)	10 ft 1 in (3.07 m)	16 reps
All values from Pro Day

=== New Orleans Saints ===
Bussey was selected by the New Orleans Saints in the seventh round of the 2011 NFL draft. He signed a 4-year contract with the team on July 28, 2011. He was waived on September 3, 2011, and re-signed to the team's practice squad on September 4. He remained with the Saints through the 2012 season. He played in the Saints' playoff win over the Detroit Lions on January 7, 2012.

=== Jacksonville Jaguars ===
Bussey was claimed off waivers by the Jacksonville Jaguars on August 13, 2012. He was released on August 25.

=== Omaha Nighthawks ===
Was a member of the Omaha Nighthawks of the United Football League for the 2012 UFL season.

=== Hamilton Tiger-Cats ===
Signed with the Hamilton Tiger-Cats of the Canadian Football League on April 11, 2013.
