= Schottenheimer =

Schottenheimer is a surname. Notable people with the surname include:

- Brian Schottenheimer (born 1973), American football coach
- Kurt Schottenheimer (born 1949), American football player and coach
- Marty Schottenheimer (1943–2021), American football player and coach
