= Kyle Knox =

American football player (born 1989)

No. 58, 53, 50
- Position: Linebacker

Personal information
- Born: January 31, 1989 (age 37); Los Angeles, California, U.S.
- Listed height: 6 ft 1 in (1.85 m)
- Listed weight: 220 lb (100 kg)

Career information
- High school: St. Bernard (Los Angeles)
- College: Fresno State
- NFL draft: 2012: undrafted

Career history
- Seattle Seahawks (2012)*; Sacramento Mountain Lions (2012); Seattle Seahawks (2012–2013)*; Jacksonville Jaguars (2013); New Orleans Saints (2013–2014); Dallas Cowboys (2015)*; Winnipeg Blue Bombers (2016–2017); Montreal Alouettes (2018)
- * Offseason or practice squad member only

Career NFL statistics
- Total tackles: 4
- Stats at Pro Football Reference
- Stats at CFL.ca

Kyle Knox (born March 10, 1989) is an American former professional football player who was a linebacker in the National Football League (NFL), Canadian Football League (CFL), United Football League (UFL). He was signed as an undrafted free agent by the Seattle Seahawks in 2012. He played college football for the Fresno State Bulldogs.

== Professional career ==
=== Seattle Seahawks (first stint) ===
Knox was originally signed by the Seattle Seahawks as an undrafted free agent on June 15, 2012. He was waived during final roster cuts on August 31, 2012.

=== Sacramento Mountain Lions ===
Knox then played for the Sacramento Mountain Lions of the United Football League (UFL) during the 2012 UFL season, and led the team in sacks with three.

=== Seattle Seahawks (first stint) ===
Knox was later signed to the Seahawks' practice squad for the final two weeks of the 2012 NFL season. On August 26, 2013, he was cut by the Seahawks.

=== Jacksonville Jaguars ===
Knox was claimed off waivers by the Jacksonville Jaguars on August 27, 2013. He was waived on October 3, 2013.

=== New Orleans Saints ===
On October 23, 2013, Knox was signed to the New Orleans Saints' practice squad. On January 1, 2014, he was promoted to the Saints' active roster. On May 4, 2015, he was released by the Saints.

=== Dallas Cowboys ===
On June 2, 2015, Knox was signed by the Dallas Cowboys. On June 5, 2015, he was released by the Cowboys.

On June 29, 2015, he was suspended by the NFL for the first four games of the 2015 season. However, no reason was given.

=== Winnipeg Blue Bombers ===
Knox played for the Winnipeg Blue Bombers of the Canadian Football League (CFL) from 2016 to 2017.

=== Montreal Alouettes ===
Knox played for the Montreal Alouettes of the CFL in 2018. He was released on August 15, 2018.
