= Khalil Paden =

American football player and coach (born 1989)

Dickinson State Blue Hawks
- Title: Wide receivers coach

Personal information
- Born: October 5, 1989 (age 37); Granada Hills, California, U.S.
- Listed height: 6 ft 1 in (1.85 m)
- Listed weight: 180 lb (82 kg)

Career information
- Position: Wide receiver (No. 13)
- High school: Cleveland (Reseda, California)
- College: San Jose State (2007–2009); Northern Arizona (2010–2011)
- NFL draft: 2012: undrafted

Career history

Playing
- Sacramento Mountain Lions (2012); Calgary Stampeders (2013)*; Orlando Predators (2014); Ottawa Redblacks (2014–2016); Toronto Argonauts (2017)
- * Offseason or practice squad member only

Coaching
- Bryant (2022–2024) Assistant wide receivers coach; Dickinson State (2025–present) Wide receivers coach

Awards and highlights
- Grey Cup champion (2016)

Khalil Alexander Paden (born October 5, 1989) is an American college football coach and former wide receiver. He is the wide receivers coach for Dickinson State University, a position he has held since 2025. He played college football at San Jose State and Northern Arizona. He was a member of the Sacramento Mountain Lions, Calgary Stampeders, Orlando Predators, Ottawa Redblacks, and Toronto Argonauts.

== Early life ==
Paden played high school football for the Cleveland High School Cavaliers of Reseda, California. He played quarterback and running back for the Cavaliers, scoring thirteen touchdowns, while earning all-league honors as a defensive back. He was selected for the Daily News All-Star Game. Paden also lettered in track and field and basketball, garnering all-city recognition as a sprinter in track and field.

== College career ==
Paden played for the San Jose State Spartans of San Jose State University from 2008 to 2009, recording six receptions for 56 yards. He was redshirted in 2007.

He played for the Northern Arizona Lumberjacks of Northern Arizona University from 2010 to 2011. He led the Lumberjacks with 61 receptions for 991 yards and eight touchdowns his senior year in 2011, earning All-Big Sky honorable mention honors. He recorded twenty receptions for 200 yards and one touchdown his junior season in 2010.

== Professional career ==
Paden spent the 2012 season with the Sacramento Mountain Lions of the United Football League.

Paden was signed by the Calgary Stampeders (CFL) on June 4, 2013. He was released by the Stampeders on June 22, 2013.

Paden was signed by the Orlando Predators on February 7, 2014. Paden finished his rookie season with the Orlando Predators with 81 catches for 1,401 yards and 23 touchdowns. He finished the season ninth in the league in receiving yards and first in yards per catch with an average of 17.3. His mark of 17.3 yards per catch was sixth best in Arena Football League history as of the 2014 season.

Paden signed with the Ottawa Redblacks (CFL) on August 5, 2014. Paden was released by the Redblacks on October 5, 2016, partially through the 2016 CFL season. On October 10, Paden was resigned to the active roster. In three seasons in Ottawa, Paden appeared in 19 games. In total, he caught 39 passes for 629 yards with 1 touchdown in the regular season. He also had a touchdown catch in the 2016 Eastern Conference Championship game. Following the 2016 season, he was not re-signed by the club and became a free agent on February 14, 2017.

After a week as a free agent, Paden and the Toronto Argonauts (CFL) agreed to a contract.

== Coaching career ==
In 2022, Paden was hired as the assistant wide receivers coach for Bryant. After three seasons with Bryant, he was hired as the wide receivers coach for Dickinson State.
