= Kurt Schottenheimer =

American football coach (born 1949)

Profile
- Position: Quarterback

Personal information
- Born: October 1, 1949 (age 77); McDonald, Pennsylvania, U.S.

Career information
- High school: Fort Cherry (CO)
- College: Coffeyville CC, Miami

Career history
- William Paterson (1974) Defensive coordinator; Michigan State (1978–1982) Linebackers coach, defensive backs coach; Tulane (1983) Defensive backs coach; LSU (1984–1985) Linebackers coach; Notre Dame (1986) Linebackers coach; Cleveland Browns (1987–1988) Special teams coordinator; Kansas City Chiefs (1989–1994) Special teams coordinator; Kansas City Chiefs (1995–1998) Defensive backs coach; Kansas City Chiefs (1999–2000) Defensive coordinator; Washington Redskins (2001) Defensive coordinator; Detroit Lions (2002–2003) Defensive coordinator; Green Bay Packers (2004) Defensive backs coach; St. Louis Rams (2005) Secondary coach; Green Bay Packers (2006–2008) Secondary coach; San Francisco 49ers (2010) Special teams coordinator; Virginia Destroyers (2011) Defensive volunteer; Virginia Destroyers (2012) Head coach

Awards and highlights
- UFL champion (2011)
- Coaching profile at Pro Football Reference

Kurt Schottenheimer (born October 1, 1949) is an American former football coach who was a position coach and coordinator at the college and professional levels for almost 40 years. During his National Football League (NFL) career, Schottenheimer coached with the Cleveland Browns, Kansas City Chiefs, San Francisco 49ers, Washington Redskins and Detroit Lions, and finished as the head coach for the Virginia Destroyers of the United Football League (UFL).

== College career ==
Schottenheimer was a junior college All-American quarterback at Coffeyville Community College, and led the nation in passing as a sophomore. The following year, he transferred to the University of Miami, where he started for his remaining two seasons at defensive back. Schottenheimer was inducted into Coffeyville's athletic Hall of Fame in 2000.

== Coaching career ==
=== Collegiate coaching ===
Schottenheimer then pursued a coaching career in the college ranks, working as the defensive coordinator for William Paterson University in 1974, the linebackers and defensive backs coach at Michigan State from 1978 to 1982, at Tulane as the defensive backs coach in 1983, then as a linebackers coach for LSU from 1984 to 1985 and with Notre Dame in 1986.

=== Professional coaching ===
Schottenheimer's successful work at the college level interested NFL teams, and he was hired by the Cleveland Browns in 1987, to be their special teams coordinator. He then accepted the same position with the Kansas City Chiefs in 1989, and remained there until 1994. Following his productive run leading the Chiefs special teams, he went on to coach Kansas City's defensive backs from 1995 to 1998, before being promoted to defensive coordinator in 1999.

Schottenheimer spent three more seasons as a defensive coordinator in the NFL, serving one year with the Washington Redskins (2001) and two seasons with the Detroit Lions (2002–2003). He then served as the secondary coach in Green Bay from 2006 until 2008. It marked Schottenheimer's second stint with the Packers, having coached defensive backs for the team in 2004, before spending one year as the secondary coach for the St. Louis Rams (2005).

Schottenheimer was hired by head coach Mike Singletary to be the San Francisco 49ers' special teams coordinator for the 2010 season. He was dismissed at the conclusion of the season following the team's firing of Singletary. After this, he joined his older brother, Marty Schottenheimer at the new Virginia Destroyers franchise of the United Football League.

In September 2012, just prior to the start of the 2012 UFL season, Schottenheimer was named as his brother's successor as head coach of the Destroyers. However, the league suspended operations during the season, and the Destroyers ended the shortened season with a 1–3 record.

== Head coaching record ==
Team	Year	Regular season					Postseason			
Team	Year	Won	Lost	Ties	Win %	Finish	Won	Lost	Win %	Result
VAD	2012	1	3	0	.250	3rd	0	0	--	
VAD Total		1	3	0	.250		0	0	.000	
Total		1	3	0	.250		0	0	.000	-

== Personal life ==
Schottenheimer is a graduate of Fort Cherry High School. He and his wife, the former Colleen Duffey, have two daughters, Steele and Sloane. His older brother Marty was head coach for four NFL teams, most notably the Kansas City Chiefs, and was his predecessor as head coach of the Virginia Destroyers of the United Football League, where Kurt previously served as a volunteer defensive assistant; Marty died in 2021. His nephew, Brian Schottenheimer, is currently the head coach of the Dallas Cowboys.
