= Jermaine McGhee =

American football player (born 1983)

No. 57, 98
- Position: Defensive end

Personal information
- Born: December 31, 1983 (age 42); San Lorenzo, California, U.S.
- Listed height: 6 ft 2 in (1.88 m)
- Listed weight: 257 lb (117 kg)

Career information
- College: Prairie View A&M
- NFL draft: 2007: undrafted

Career history
- Kansas City Chiefs (2008)*; Buffalo Bills (2009); Sacramento Mountain Lions (2010)*; Montreal Alouettes (2011)*; Chicago Rush (2012); Las Vegas Locomotives (2012); San Antonio Talons (2014)
- * Offseason or practice squad member only

Awards and highlights
- First-team All-SWAC (2006)

Career AFL statistics
- Total tackles: 4
- Stats at ArenaFan.com

Jermaine Terrill McGhee (born December 31, 1983) is an American former football defensive end. He was signed by the Kansas City Chiefs as an undrafted free agent in 2008. He played college football at Prairie View A&M, where he was ranked in the nation in sacks with 14 his senior year; he finished his college career with 24 sacks while playing defensive end for his last two years of his college career; he started as a defensive back (strong safety). McGhee was also a member of the Buffalo Bills, Sacramento Mountain Lions, Montreal Alouettes, Chicago Rush, Las Vegas Locomotives, and San Antonio Talons.

== Early life ==
McGhee graduated from San Lorenzo High School in 2002.

== Professional career ==
=== Kansas City Chiefs ===
On October 1, 2008, McGhee was signed to the Kansas City Chiefs' practice squad. He was released on November 13.

=== Buffalo Bills ===
McGhee was signed by the Buffalo Bills on May 12, 2009. He was placed on injured reserve on August 11. He was waived on February 18, 2010 after failing his physical with the team.
