= Chris Davis (wide receiver, born 1984) =

American football player (born 1984)

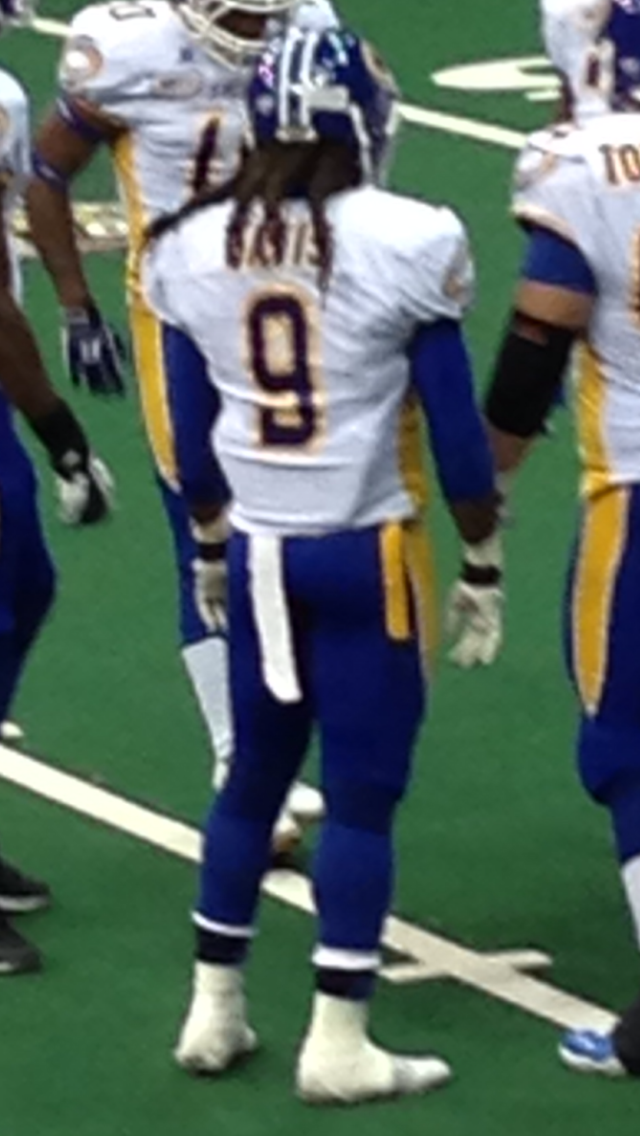
- Davis with the Tampa Bay Storm in 2013

No. 17, 9, 5
- Position: Wide receiver

Personal information
- Born: January 23, 1984 (age 42); St. Petersburg, Florida, U.S.
- Listed height: 5 ft 10 in (1.78 m)
- Listed weight: 181 lb (82 kg)

Career information
- High school: St. Petersburg Catholic
- College: Florida State
- NFL draft: 2007: 4th round, 128th overall pick

Career history
- Tennessee Titans (2007–2009); Cincinnati Bengals (2010)*; New York Giants (2010)*; Hartford Colonials (2010)*; Omaha Nighthawks (2011-2012); Montreal Alouettes (2012); Tampa Bay Storm (2013–2014); Columbus Lions (2014–2015)
- * Offseason or practice squad member only

Career NFL statistics
- Receptions: 7
- Receiving yards: 69
- Stats at Pro Football Reference

Career AFL statistics
- Receptions: 71
- Receiving yards: 759
- Receiving touchdowns: 11
- Stats at ArenaFan.com

Christopher C. Davis (born January 23, 1984) is an American former professional football player who was a wide receiver for the Tennessee Titans of the National Football League (NFL). He was selected by the Titans in the fourth round of the 2007 NFL draft. He played college football for the Florida State Seminoles. Davis was also a member of the Cincinnati Bengals, New York Giants, Hartford Colonials, Omaha Nighthawks, Montreal Alouettes, Tampa Bay Storm, and Columbus Lions.

== Professional career ==
=== Hartford Colonials ===
Davis was signed by the Hartford Colonials in 2010. He was released on September 5.

=== Omaha Nighthawks ===
Davis was signed by the Omaha Nighthawks on June 10, 2011.

=== Montreal Alouettes ===
On March 26, 2012, Davis was signed by the Montreal Alouettes.
