= Joe Hastings (American football) =

American football player, coach, and executive (born 1987)

Indianapolis Colts
- Title: Assistant special teams coach

Personal information
- Born: May 5, 1987 (age 39); Wichita, Kansas, U.S.
- Listed height: 6 ft 0 in (1.83 m)
- Listed weight: 185 lb (84 kg)

Career information
- Position: Wide receiver (No. 13)
- High school: Bishop Carroll Catholic (Wichita, Kansas)
- College: Washburn
- NFL draft: 2011: undrafted

Career history

Playing
- San Francisco 49ers (2011); Sacramento Mountain Lions (2012); San Francisco 49ers (2013)*; Miami Dolphins (2013)*
- * Offseason or practice squad member only

Coaching
- Michigan (2015−2016) Graduate assistant; Michigan (2017) Offensive assistant; Indiana State (2018) Wide receivers coach; Indiana State (2019) Wide receivers coach & pass game coordinator; Indianapolis Colts (2021–present) Assistant special teams coach

Operations
- Philadelphia Eagles (2014) Pro personnel assistant; Ole Miss (2020) Senior player personnel analyst
- Stats at Pro Football Reference

Joe Hastings (born May 5, 1987) is an American former professional football player who was a wide receiver in the San Francisco 49ers of the National Football League (NFL). He played college football for the Washburn Ichabods and was signed by the 49ers as an undrafted free agent in 2011.

== Playing career ==
Pre-draft measurables
Height	Weight	40-yard dash	10-yard split	20-yard split	20-yard shuttle	Three-cone drill	Vertical jump	Broad jump	Bench press
5 ft 11 1/2 in (1.82 m)	190 lb (86 kg)	4.51 s	1.61 s	2.59 s	4.40 s	7.08 s	35.0 in (0.89 m)	9 ft 11 in (3.02 m)	13 reps
All values from Pro Day

=== San Francisco 49ers (first stint) ===
Hastings was signed by the San Francisco 49ers as an undrafted free agent following the 2011 NFL draft on July 27, 2011. He was released following training camp and was signed to the 49ers practice squad on September 4. He was promoted to the active roster for several games late in the season.

In 2012, he was cut by the 49ers after an injury limited his role in training camp.

=== Sacramento Mountain Lions ===
Hastings signed with the UFL's Sacramento Mountain Lions.

=== San Francisco 49ers (second stint) ===
In 2013, he once again signed with the 49ers. He was released on June 4, 2013, in order to make room on the roster for Kassim Osgood, he was then picked up by the Miami Dolphins.

=== Miami Dolphins ===
On June 13, 2013, Hastings was signed by the Miami Dolphins. On July 8, 2013, the Dolphins placed Hastings on the reserve/retired list. He retired from professional football the next day.

== Executive career ==
Hastings was hired by the Philadelphia Eagles as a pro personnel assistant on June 4, 2014.

== Coaching career ==
Hastings was hired by the University of Michigan as a defensive graduate assistant in January 2015.

Hastings became the wide receivers coach at Indiana State University in February 2018.

On February 9, 2021, Hastings was announced by the Indianapolis Colts as an assistant special teams coach. On May 18, 2024, Hastings was promoted to the title of senior assistant special teams coach.
