= Cary Williams =

American football player (born 1984)

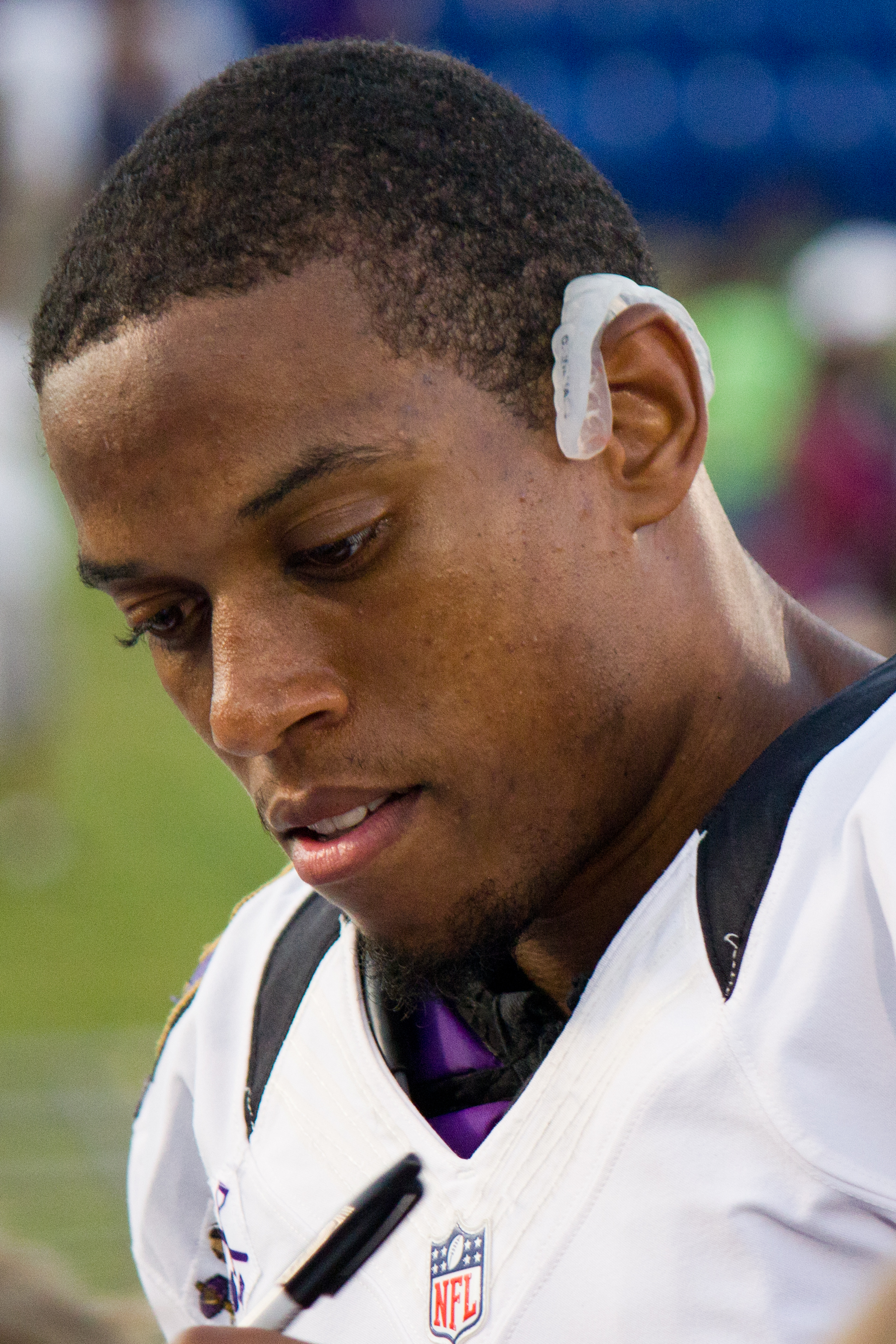
- Williams with the Baltimore Ravens in 2012

No. 41, 29, 26, 40
- Position: Cornerback

Personal information
- Born: December 23, 1984 (age 41); Miami, Florida, U.S.
- Listed height: 6 ft 1 in (1.85 m)
- Listed weight: 190 lb (86 kg)

Career information
- High school: Chaminade–Madonna College Prep (Hollywood, Florida)
- College: Fordham (2003–2004); Washburn (2005–2007)
- NFL draft: 2008: 7th round, 229th overall pick

Career history
- Tennessee Titans (2008–2009); Baltimore Ravens (2009–2012); Philadelphia Eagles (2013–2014); Seattle Seahawks (2015); Washington Redskins (2015)

Awards and highlights
- Super Bowl champion (XLVII); Consensus Division II All-American (2007)

Career NFL statistics
- Total tackles: 359
- Sacks: 3
- Forced fumbles: 5
- Fumble recoveries: 2
- Interceptions: 9
- Defensive touchdowns: 2
- Stats at Pro Football Reference

Cary Eric Williams (born December 23, 1984) is an American former professional football player who was a cornerback in the National Football League (NFL). He played college football for the Washburn Ichabods and was selected by the Tennessee Titans in the seventh round of the 2008 NFL draft.

Williams also played for the Baltimore Ravens, Philadelphia Eagles, Seattle Seahawks, and Washington Redskins.

== Early life ==
Williams is the son of Calvin and Trina Golson. He played as a wide receiver and defensive back at Chaminade-Madonna College Preparatory School in Hollywood, Florida as a senior, after attending Coral Gables High School as a junior and Charles W. Flanagan High School as a freshman and sophomore. In addition to football, Williams was also a star in track & field. He was one of the state's top sprinters, with personal-best times of 48.81 seconds in the 400-meter dash and 14.09 seconds in the 110 metres hurdles.

== College career ==
=== Fordham ===
Williams originally attended Fordham University, but after a year of limited playing time, transferred to Washburn University in Topeka, Kansas.

=== Washburn ===
Williams had seven interceptions as a senior, which rank second on Washburn's single-season list. In his last season, he had two kickoff returns for touchdowns, which tied the Washburn season and career records. In 2007, Against Missouri Southern, he had a 100-yard kickoff return that tied the school record for longest runback. Williams was the only NCAA Division II player to be ranked in the top 10 in the nation in interceptions and kickoff return average in 2007.

Williams holds the distinction of being the only player in Washburn history to score on an interception, kickoff return and a reception in the same season. He graduated with a sports management major.

== Professional career ==
=== Pre-draft ===
Pre-draft measurables
Height	Weight	40-yard dash	10-yard split	20-yard split	20-yard shuttle	Three-cone drill	Vertical jump	Broad jump	Bench press
6 ft 1 1/8 in (1.86 m)	185 lb (84 kg)	4.43 s	1.47 s	2.56 s	4.34 s	6.94 s	32.5 in (0.83 m)	9 ft 11 in (3.02 m)	8 reps
All values from Pro Day

During his Pro Day, Williams had a 330-pound squat, 245-pound bench press, a 242-pound power clean, and a 14/18 Wonderlic score.

=== Tennessee Titans ===
Williams was selected by the Tennessee Titans in the seventh round (229th overall) of the 2008 NFL draft. He became only the fifth player to be drafted in school history. On August 30, 2008, Williams was waived by the Titans. and re-signed to the team's practice squad. The Titans promoted Williams to their active roster on December 9. He was injured after a game and finished the 2008 NFL season on Injured Reserve.

Williams played in the Pro Football Hall of Fame game in 2009. He had 2 tackles and knocked down a potential touchdown pass. He was declared inactive for the first 2 games of the 2009 season, and was cut when the team signed punter Reggie Hodges. He was re-signed to the practice squad on September 29. The Titans signed Williams to the active roster on October 3 when quarterback Patrick Ramsey was released. He was waived on November 3, to make room for Chris Davis. He was re-signed to the practice squad on November 5. He had recorded 12 tackles through only four games, which caught the attention of the Ravens.

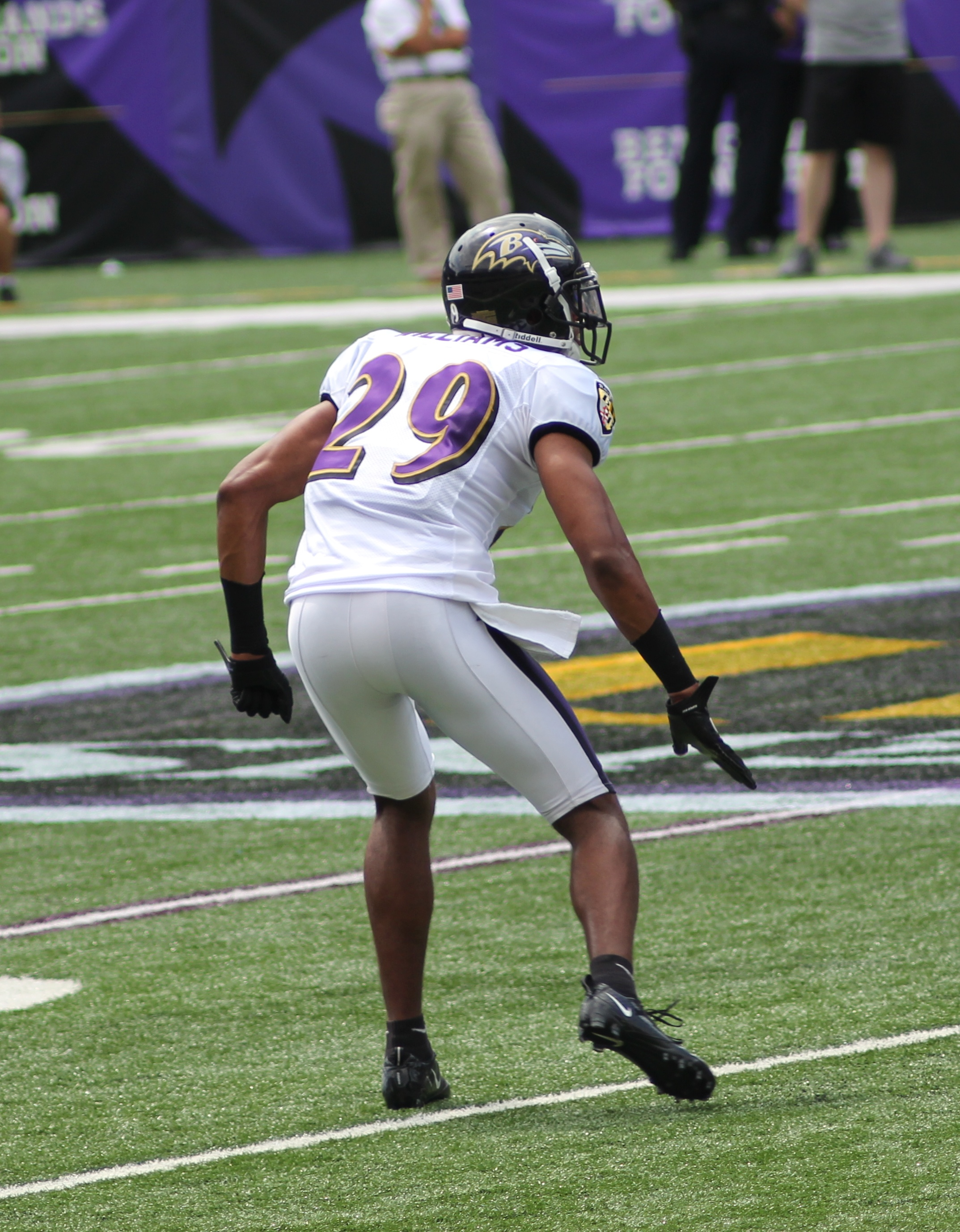
Williams during Training Camp practice at M&T Bank Stadium in 2011.

=== Baltimore Ravens ===
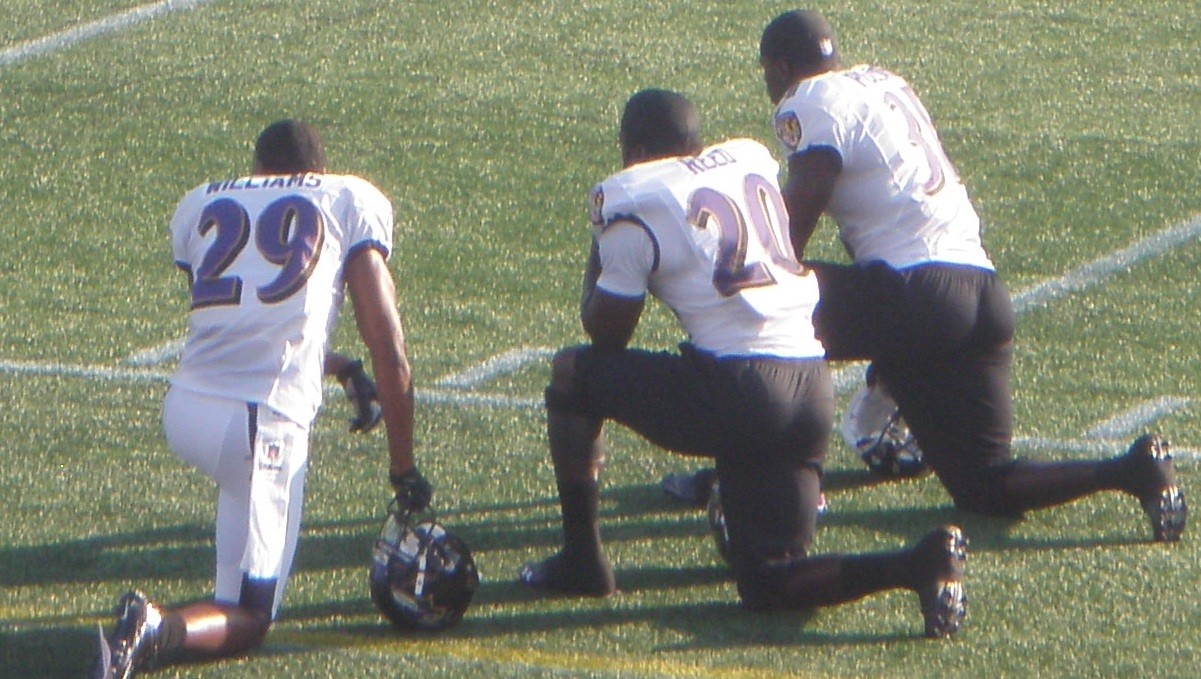
Ed Reed (20), Bernard Pollard (31), and Williams (29) at Navy–Marine Corps Memorial Stadium in August 2012.

Williams was signed off the Titans practice squad by the Baltimore Ravens on November 24, 2009. He was a special teams contributor that season and saw little time on defense. He recorded eight tackles that year, mostly on special teams.

In 2010, Williams was suspended for the first two games of the season for conduct against the NFL's personnel conduct policy. Very few details were disclosed on the specifics of Williams' actions. Despite all this, Williams played well in preseason and earned a roster spot. He had six tackles in 2010 as he saw more time in the secondary later that year. In a game against the Miami Dolphins, Williams caught a pass on a fake punt from Sam Koch and ran it for a first down.

In 2011, after the departures of corners Josh Wilson and Fabian Washington, and with Williams again playing well in Training Camp and preseason, he earned his first NFL start alongside Lardarius Webb in a Week 1 victory over the Pittsburgh Steelers. He had five tackles and contained Pittsburgh receiver Mike Wallace. In a divisional playoff win against the Houston Texans, Williams tackled Texans returner Jacoby Jones. Williams forced Jones to fumble, and the ball was recovered by fellow cornerback Jimmy Smith inside the five yard line. Williams was considered to have had an up and down 2011 campaign. Despite recording no interceptions, Williams had several good games and was noted for his aggressive playstyle. However, he often struggled while covering the deep ball.

In Week 3 of the 2012 season, Williams surrendered 121 yards passing to Tom Brady. However, the Ravens were able to squeeze by 31–30. A week later however, Williams collected the first interception of his NFL career off Brandon Weeden of the Cleveland Browns, returning it 63 yards for a touchdown, partially redeeming his lackluster performance the week before. The score helped the Ravens win 23–16 and improve to 3–1. He recorded three more interceptions that year, tying safety Ed Reed for the team lead with 4. On January 6, 2013, during the wild-card round of the 2012 playoffs against the Indianapolis Colts, Williams intercepted a pass deflection thrown by Colts quarterback Andrew Luck on 4th & 1 with 5:43 remaining in the 4th quarter on the Ravens 15-yard line and returned it 41 yards. This proved to be a significant play that helped the Ravens win the game 24–9. On January 20, 2013, in the AFC Championship game against the Patriots, Williams intercepted a pass from Tom Brady in the end zone in the 4th quarter with 1:06 remaining in regulation, sealing the win for the Ravens 28–13 and a trip to Super Bowl XLVII. The Ravens would go on to defeat the San Francisco 49ers by a score of 34–31.

=== Philadelphia Eagles ===
On March 14, 2013, Williams signed with the Philadelphia Eagles to a three-year, $17 million deal, including $5.75 million guaranteed. Williams started all 32 games over 2 seasons with the Eagles, recording 126 tackles, 5 interceptions, 21 pass deflections, and a sack. After two seasons with the team, the Eagles released Williams on March 3, 2015.

=== Seattle Seahawks ===
On March 10, 2015, Williams signed with the Seattle Seahawks on a $18 million three-year contract, with $7 million guaranteed.

In his first game with Seattle in Week 1 against the St. Louis Rams, Williams recorded 3 tackles, a sack, a forced fumble, a fumble recovery, and a touchdown in the 34–31 overtime loss. Williams struggled throughout the remainder of the season however, and on December 7, 2015, Williams was released after losing his starting job to DeShawn Shead in Week 12 against Pittsburgh.

Williams finished his stint in Seattle with 46 tackles, 1 sack, 1 pass deflection, and 1 forced fumble.

=== Washington Redskins ===
On January 5, 2016, Williams signed with the Washington Redskins.

=== Retirement ===
On December 20, 2019, the Ravens announced that Williams would retire as a member of the organization.
