= Jim Fassel =

American football player and coach (1949–2021)

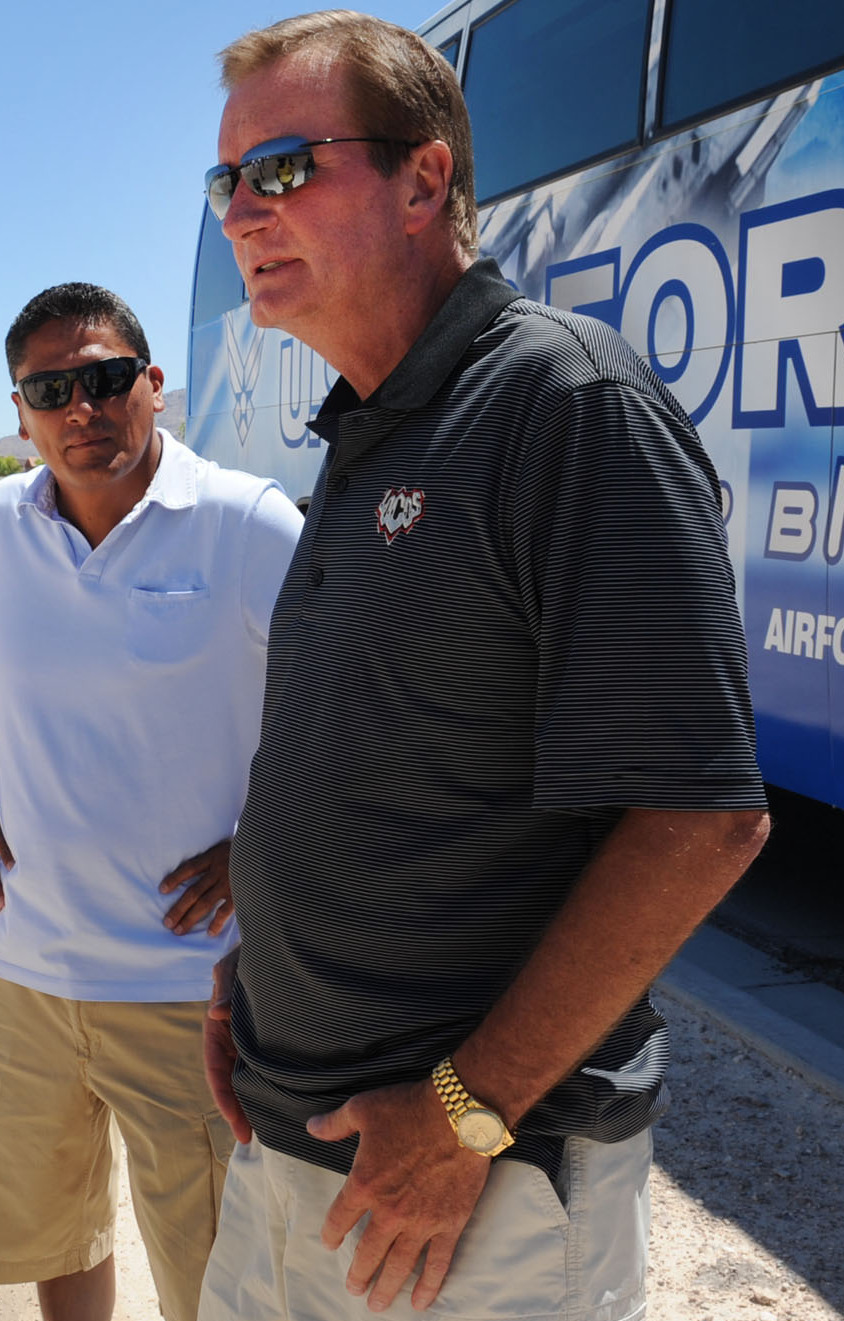
- Fassel at Nellis Air Force Base in 2011

Personal information
- Born: August 31, 1949; Anaheim, California, U.S.
- Died: June 7, 2021 (aged 71); Las Vegas, Nevada, U.S.
- Listed height: 6 ft 1 in (1.85 m)
- Listed weight: 210 lb (95 kg)

Career information
- High school: Anaheim (Anaheim, California)
- College: Long Beach State
- NFL draft: 1972: 7th round, 167th overall pick

Career history

Playing
- Chicago Bears (1972); San Diego Chargers (1972); Houston Oilers (1972); Toronto Argonauts (1973); The Hawaiians (1974–1975)

Coaching
- The Hawaiians (1974) Assistant coach; Fullerton (1974) Assistant coach; Utah (1976) Quarterbacks & receivers coach; Weber State (1977–1978) Quarterbacks & receivers coach; Stanford (1979–1980) Wide receivers & running backs coach; Stanford (1981–1983) Offensive coordinator; New Orleans Breakers (1984) Offensive coordinator; Utah (1985–1989) Head coach; New York Giants (1991–1992) Offensive coordinator & quarterbacks coach; Denver Broncos (1993–1994) Offensive coordinator; Oakland Raiders (1995) Quarterbacks coach; Arizona Cardinals (1996) Offensive coordinator; New York Giants (1997–2003) Head coach; Baltimore Ravens (2004) Offensive consultant; Baltimore Ravens (2005–2006) Offensive coordinator; Las Vegas Locomotives (2009–2012) Head coach

Awards and highlights
- NFL Coach of the Year (1997); 2× UFL champion (2009, 2010)

Head coaching record
- Regular season: College: 25–33 (.431); NFL: 58–53–1 (.522); UFL: 16–6 (.727)
- Postseason: NFL: 2–3 (.400); UFL: 2–1 (.667)
- Career: NFL: 60–56–1 (.517); UFL: 18–7 (.720)
- Coaching profile at Pro Football Reference

James Edward Fassel (August 31, 1949 – June 7, 2021) was an American college and professional football player and coach. He was the head coach of the New York Giants of the National Football League (NFL) from 1997 to 2003. He was offensive coordinator of other NFL teams, and as head coach, general manager, and president of the Las Vegas Locomotives of the United Football League (UFL).

== Playing career ==
Born and raised in Anaheim, Fassel graduated from Anaheim High School where as a senior quarterback, he helped to lead his team to a 12–1 record and a runner-up finish in the CIF Southern Section 4-A Division. During his senior season, he was a teammate of future Pittsburgh Steelers offensive guard Gerry Mullins. In college, Fassel played quarterback at Fullerton College, USC, and Long Beach State. He was selected as a quarterback in the seventh round by the Chicago Bears in the 1972 NFL draft. He had a short playing career with the Bears, San Diego Chargers, and Houston Oilers in 1972.

Fassel played briefly with The Hawaiians of the WFL in 1974, and became an assistant coach during the 1974 WFL season. He left the WFL after the '74 season, but briefly returned when the Hawaiians needed a quarterback late in the 1975 season. He played in the final game of the WFL for the Hawaiians, throwing the last pass in the league's history as the WFL folded three days later on October 22, 1975.

== Coaching career ==
Fassel's first professional coaching job was with The Hawaiians of the World Football League (WFL) in 1974, where he played quarterback before moving to the sidelines as an offensive assistant coach. He then began his college coaching career with stints at the University of Utah, Weber State and Stanford University, where he worked with John Elway. After five months as the offensive coordinator and quarterback coach for the New Orleans Breakers of the United States Football League (USFL), He was named head football coach at the University of Utah on November 30, 1984.

Before becoming New York Giants head coach, Fassel served as an assistant coach with the Arizona Cardinals, Denver Broncos, New York Giants, and Oakland Raiders.

=== Head coach of New York Giants ===
Fassel originally coached with the Giants as an assistant in 1991 and 1992. Three weeks after the Giants won Super Bowl XXV, he was hired by Bill Parcells as their quarterback coach. In 1992, he was promoted to offensive coordinator.

The departure of Dan Reeves as coach after the 1996 season led to close consideration between bringing back Parcells or Fassel. Young hired Fassel, narrowly avoiding a call to bring back Parcells. Fassel was hired as the head coach of the New York Giants, starting with the 1997 season, and remained in that position for seven years. He finished his Giants - and NFL - head coaching career with a won-loss record of 58–53–1.

During Fassel's tenure as head coach of the Giants, his teams were known for numerous strong runs in December and for winning big games, such as handing the Denver Broncos their first loss of the 1998 season after a 13–0 start.

In his first year, 1997, Fassel turned around a team which had finished a cumulative 11–21 the prior two seasons, finishing 10–5–1 and being named NFL coach of the year. While with the team, he resurrected the career of quarterback Kerry Collins. In his fourth year as head coach, the 2000 season, he received acclaim for his "playoff guarantee" during which he led the Giants to an improbable NFC Championship. With the team having lost consecutive games and falling to 7–4, Fassel made a public guarantee that they would make the playoffs. The team then won their next five games to finish off the regular season, and cruised through the playoffs, defeating the heavily favored Minnesota Vikings by a blowout score of 41–0 in the NFC Championship game, before losing to the Ray Lewis-led Baltimore Ravens in Super Bowl XXXV.

Fassel's legacy as head coach for the Giants is mixed, as his Giants teams were also known for their disappointments against inferior teams in the regular season, as well as in the playoffs. The most notable loss was a 39–38 loss to the San Francisco 49ers in the 2002 postseason, in which they lost a 38–14 third quarter lead. Fassel's last season with the team was the 2003 season, a year in which injuries decimated the Giants. With two games left in the season and knowing that the team was nearly certain to let him go at its conclusion, Fassel announced his resignation as head coach, effective at season's end. The team finished that year with a 4–12 record.

While coaching for the Giants, Fassel lived in Ho-Ho-Kus, New Jersey.

==== "The Playoff Guarantee" ====
In 2000, the Giants started off well but fell to 7–4. Under heavy criticism from the New York media and Giants' upper management, Fassel ad hoc'ed a famous speech that predicted a playoff berth that proved to be the impetus for a run at Super Bowl XXXV:

"This is a poker game, and I'm shoving my chips to the middle of the table, I'm raising the ante, and anybody who wants to get in, get in. Anybody who wants out can get out. This team is going to the playoffs, OK? This team is going to the playoffs."

==== Involvement in 9/11 recovery ====
Fassel and the Giants, on the way home from a regular season Monday Night Football loss on the road the previous night to the Denver Broncos, landed in New York mere hours before the 9/11 attacks on the World Trade Center and Pentagon. According to former kicker Morten Andersen, their plane landed beside doomed Flight 93, which was about to take off and would ultimately crash in Pennsylvania. With the NFL games that week suspended, Fassel was called by Mayor Rudy Giuliani to help morale at the Trade Center site. Fassel agreed and insisted that the team use its goodwill to help the recovery effort and provide assistance to the FDNY, NYPD and the City of New York. Under pressure from recovery crews to win the next game in Kansas City, the Giants went on to win an emotional game in front of the Chiefs' respectful fans on the road at Arrowhead Stadium.

=== Baltimore Ravens ===
Fassel joined the Ravens as an offensive consultant in 2004 to help with development of Kyle Boller. He became the Ravens offensive coordinator in 2005. Critics of Fassel pointed to his lack of success as offensive coordinator after two seasons with the Ravens, in 2005 and part of 2006. During that time, the Ravens ranked near the bottom of the league in offense.

On October 17, 2006, Fassel was fired by the Ravens.

=== Las Vegas Locomotives ===
In January 2009, Fassel was named coach of the Las Vegas entrant into the United Football League. The Locos finished the regular season 4–2 and defeated the 6–0 Florida Tuskers in the first UFL Championship Game.

Fassel returned to the Locos in 2010 and helped lead the team to repeat as champions, again defeating the Tuskers in the 2010 UFL Championship Game. The Locos tried to three-peat in 2011, but this time fell to the Tuskers (who had since been relocated and renamed the Virginia Destroyers) in the 2011 UFL Championship Game. Fassel was the only current UFL head coach who was active in the league since its inauguration and was the Locos' head coach when the league suspended play in 2012.

== Broadcasting career ==
Fassel entered broadcasting following his firing as offensive coordinator for the Ravens, joining Westwood One radio as a color commentator for its Sunday NFL action. He stayed with the network for two seasons, calling Sunday afternoon games with Harry Kalas in 2007 and Sunday Night Football with Dave Sims. Fassel was also part of Westwood One's playoff coverage those two years, calling various games, and worked the 2007 and 2008 NFC Championship Games with Bill Rosinski (2007) and Marv Albert (2008).

== Personal life ==
Fassel met his wife Kitty when they were 17-year-old college freshmen in 1967. Fassel was at Fullerton Community College, while Kitty was a student at Cal-State Fullerton. In April 1969, Kitty gave birth to a son, the product of an unplanned pregnancy. The young parents were both 19 years old and unmarried. They considered marrying due to the pregnancy, but did not want to make a decision under pressure. They had never considered abortion during the pregnancy. Instead, when the child was three days old, they gave him up for adoption, and subsequently lost touch with him. Two years later, in 1971, Jim and Kitty married.

In 2003, after years of searching, the Fassels found the child whom they had placed for adoption. They had a family reunion, which included the Fassels and their other four adult children (three sons and a daughter, one of whom is football coach John Fassel). Their 34-year-old adopted son, John Mathieson, brought along his own wife and their four young daughters.

Three years later, in 2006, Jim and Kitty Fassel divorced after years of counseling. They later reconciled and re-married.

Fassel was good friends with fellow coach Mike Holmgren, dating back to their days as USC quarterbacks.

== Death ==
Jim Fassel died of a heart attack on June 7, 2021, in Las Vegas, Nevada. He was 71 years old.

== Head coaching record ==
=== College ===
Year	Team	Overall	Conference	Standing	Bowl/playoffs
Utah Utes (Western Athletic Conference) (1985–1989)
1985	Utah	8–4	5–3	3rd	
1986	Utah	2–9	1–7	9th	
1987	Utah	5–7	2–6	7th	
1988	Utah	6–5	4–4	5th	
1989	Utah	4–8	2–6	7th	
Utah:		25–33	14–26		
Total:		25–33			

=== NFL ===
Team	Year	Regular season					Postseason			
Team	Year	Won	Lost	Ties	Win %	Finish	Won	Lost	Win %	Result
NYG	1997	10	5	1	.656	1st in NFC East	0	1	.000	Lost to Minnesota Vikings in Wild Card Game
NYG	1998	8	8	0	.500	3rd in NFC East	–	–	–	–
NYG	1999	7	9	0	.438	3rd in NFC East	–	–	–	–
NYG	2000	12	4	0	.750	1st in NFC East	2	1	.667	Lost to Baltimore Ravens in Super Bowl XXXV
NYG	2001	7	9	0	.438	3rd in NFC East	–	–	–	–
NYG	2002	10	6	0	.625	2nd in NFC East	0	1	.000	Lost to San Francisco 49ers in Wild Card Game
NYG	2003	4	12	0	.250	4th in NFC East	–	–	–	–
Total		58	53	1	.522		2	3	.400	

=== UFL ===
Team	Year	Regular season					Postseason			
Team	Year	Won	Lost	Ties	Win %	Finish	Won	Lost	Win %	Result
LVL	2009	4	2	0	.667	2nd in UFL	1	0	1.000	Defeated Florida Tuskers in Championship Game
LVL	2010	5	3	0	.625	1st in UFL	1	0	1.000	Defeated Florida Tuskers in Championship Game
LVL	2011	3	1	0	.750	2nd in UFL	0	1	.000	Lost to Virginia Destroyers in Championship Game
LVL	2012	4	0	0	1.000	1st in UFL	–	–	–	–
Total		16	6	0	.727		2	1	.667	

== See also ==
- History of the New York Giants (1994–present)
