= 2011 UFL championship game =

| Las Vegas Locomotives (3–1) | Virginia Destroyers (3–1) |
|---|---|
| 3 | 17 |
| Head coach: Jim Fassel | Head coach: Marty Schottenheimer |
| | 1 | 2 | 3 | 4 | Total |
|---|---|---|---|---|---|
| LV | 0 | 3 | 0 | 0 | 3 |
| VA | 7 | 10 | 0 | 0 | 17 |
- Date: October 21, 2011
- Stadium: Virginia Beach Sportsplex Virginia Beach, VA
- MVP: Aaron Rouse, strong safety
- Referee: Perry Havener
- Attendance: 14,172

Ceremonies
- National anthem: Lt. Col. Katherine A. Strus

TV in the United States
- Network: Comcast SportsNet Mid-Atlantic
- Announcers: Brent Harris (play-by-play); Jerry Glanville (color analysis)

The 2011 UFL championship game was the third championship game of the United Football League and took place on October 21, 2011, the concluding weekend of the league's truncated third season. The game was won by the Virginia Destroyers, who, in front of a standing-room-only home crowd at Virginia Beach Sportsplex, defeated the two-time defending champion Las Vegas Locomotives 17–3, spurred by the performance of strong safety and game MVP Aaron Rouse. The win gave Destroyers coach Marty Schottenheimer, notorious for his failure to reach the Super Bowl in his NFL coaching career despite strong regular season statistics, his first and only championship as a professional head coach and his first professional championship since the 1965 American Football League championship game, Schottenheimer's rookie season as a player.

== Background ==
The date of the 2011 championship game was the subject of ongoing upheaval in the UFL both before and during its 2011 season. At the start of the offseason, the UFL had six teams: the Las Vegas Locomotives, Sacramento Mountain Lions, Omaha Nighthawks, Florida Tuskers, Hartford Colonials, and expansion Virginia Destroyers. The leagued had hoped for a ten-game season involving those six teams that would begin in August with the title game in late October or early November, on the premise that the National Football League's ongoing player lockout would extend into its preseason and early regular season, which takes place in August and September. Plans would start to shift in January 2011, when the Tuskers folded and its players and staff shifted to Virginia to form the Destroyers. The UFL's new plans for a five-team season, starting in August and ending with the title game the weekend of October 21–23, would be delayed in July and changed in August, when the Colonials were folded, the NFL's lockout was resolved, and the UFL couldn't reach a national TV partnership.

The UFL's 2011 season would finally begin on September 15, with the championship game set for the weekend of November 4–5. By mid-October, when five of the season's seven weeks were played, the UFL announced the cancellation of the last two weeks of the season and moved up the title game to the night of October 21—ironically the weekend originally slated for the title game in the previous five-team plan. Virginia and Las Vegas, who shared first place at the time of cancellation (with identical 3–1 records) were awarded berths in the championship game. Using similar criteria employed to determine the 2010 championship game's host venue (an inexact formula based on team success and fan support), Virginia Beach Sportsplex was announced as the 2011 title game's venue; the Destroyers attracted crowds in the 12,000 for their two home games, while only 6,500 came to Las Vegas' lone home game on October 8 (the Locos' final two home games were among the games cancelled by the league).

On the field, the play of the Locomotives and Destroyers (the former Florida Tuskers) were on par with their performances in 2009 and 2010. Coached by Jim Fassel, the Locos were led by quarterback Chase Clement, the 2010 title game MVP, and the top-ranked passing defense in the UFL. The Destroyers, under the guidance of 2011 Coach of the Year Marty Schottenheimer, were led by running back Dominic Rhodes, the league's leading rusher, top scorer, and Offensive Player of the Year.

== Game summary ==
The championship game was dominated by defense, specifically that of the Destroyers. On the 3rd offensive drive of the game (Las Vegas' 2nd), Virginia strong safety Aaron Rouse put the first points on the board with a return of a Chase Clement interception 46 yards for a touchdown with 8:32 remaining in the 1st quarter; it was Rouse's 2nd of 3 interceptions in the game. Indeed, Virginia's defense would hound Clement all night; the Locos' quarterback "just couldn't make it happen" (his post-game comment) was held to 93 yards passing, sacked 6 times, threw the 3 INT's to Rouse, and failed to get a 1st down until 7:45 remained in the 3rd quarter.

The Destroyers’ offense fared a little better than the Locos'. On the 3rd play of the 2nd quarter, Virginia's Clifton Smith returned a Danny Baugher punt 60 yards to the Las Vegas 7; 3 plays later, Dominic Rhodes would score on a 2-yard run for a 14–0 Destroyers lead. After a 32-yard Clint Stitser field goal (the Locos' only points of the night) made it 14–3, Virginia would respond on the next drive with a Delbert Alvarado field goal (from 21 yards out) to cement the final score. The Destroyers defense would stand down in the 2nd half and secure the team the UFL title and deny the Locos a championship three-peat.

== Scoring summary ==
| Team | Qtr | Scoring info | LV | VA |
|---|---|---|---|---|
| VA | 1st | Aaron Rouse 46-yd interception return for TD (Delbert Alvarado kick) | 0 | 7 |
| VA | 2nd | Dominic Rhodes 2-yd TD run (Delbert Alvarado kick) (2 plays, 7 yards, 0:42) | 0 | 14 |
| LV | 2nd | Clint Stitser 32-yd Field Goal (4 plays, 6 yards, 1:24) | 3 | 14 |
| VA | 2nd | Delbert Alvarado 21-yd Field Goal (12 plays, 75 yards, 4:28) | 3 | 17 |

== Statistical leaders ==
Rushing leaders

- LV: Hakim Hill, 43 yards on 9 carries
- VA: Dominic Rhodes, 96 yards on 27 carries

Passing leaders

- LV: Chase Clement, 7–26, 93 yards, 3 INT's
- VA: Chris Greisen, 21–31, 154 yards, 1 INT

Receiving leaders

- LV: Samie Parker, 2 catches for 27 yards
- VA: Dominic Rhodes, 4 catches for 9 yards

Defensive leaders

- LV: Wale Dada, 8.5 tackles (8 solo, 1 assisted); Brandon Moore, 2 tackles (4 assisted), 1 INT
- VA: Tony Taylor, 4.5 tackles (2 solo, 5 assisted); Aaron Rouse, 4 tackles (2 solo, 4 assisted), 3 INT's, 1 TD

== Most valuable player ==
Virginia Destroyers strong safety Aaron Rouse was awarded the UFL championship game's most valuable player award after the game. Rouse, a Virginia Beach native and former Virginia Tech star, spearheaded the Destroyers' defensive performance in the game, with 3 interceptions (the 2nd of which he returned for the first touchdown of the game), 4 tackles, and 2 pass break-ups. Rouse's performance came during a difficult personal week, when he suffered the loss of his 19-year-old cousin in a shooting incident.

== Broadcasting ==
Unlike the league's first two championship games, which were broadcast by former TV partner Versus, which had fairly wide national cable and satellite availability, TV coverage of the 2011 UFL championship game was limited to regional coverage by Comcast SportsNet Mid-Atlantic, with Brent Harris and Jerry Glanville calling the game. The broadcast was simulcast online through the UFL's partnership with Veetle. Radio coverage was provided by the Locos' and Destroyers' respective radio outlets, KBAD and WVSP-FM.

== Consolation game ==
As part of the UFL's cancellation announcement of its 2011 regular season, a "consolation game" involving the league's third- and fourth-place teams, the Omaha Nighthawks and Sacramento Mountain Lions, was also set for October 21 and played concurrently with the championship game. The game, played at Omaha's TD Ameritrade Park, was one of the games cancelled by the UFL (it had been scheduled for October 28) and had a high demand (15,000 tickets were sold); rather than distributing a mass refund, the UFL moved the game to October 21 while honoring tickets for the October 28 game. In front of a crowd of 10,123, the Mountain Lions won in overtime, 25–19, thanks to a 23-yard touchdown run by running back Cory Ross with 1:36 left in the extra period. This game was the first third-place outdoor professional American football game played since the NFL had discontinued the Playoff Bowl effective after the one held at the end of the 1969 season.
