= Troy Stedman =

American football player (born 1965)

No. 94, 96
- Position: Linebacker

Personal information
- Born: May 19, 1965 (age 61); Cedar Falls, Iowa, U.S.
- Listed height: 6 ft 3 in (1.91 m)
- Listed weight: 243 lb (110 kg)

Career information
- High school: Cedar Falls
- College: Iowa Central CC; Washburn
- NFL draft: 1988: 7th round, 170th overall pick

Career history
- Kansas City Chiefs (1988); Pittsburgh Steelers (1989)*; Raleigh–Durham Skyhawks (1991)
- * Offseason or practice squad member only

Career NFL statistics
- Games played: 5
- Stats at Pro Football Reference

Troy M. Stedman (born May 19, 1965) is an American former professional football player who was a linebacker for the Kansas City Chiefs of the National Football League (NFL). He was selected by the Chiefs in the seventh round of the 1988 NFL draft. He attended Iowa Central Community College before playing college football for the Washburn Ichabods. He was the third Ichabod to be drafted in the NFL.
