= Virginia Beach Sportsplex =

Sports complex in Virginia Beach

Coordinates: 36.76875°N 76.09347°W

- Sportsplex Stadium
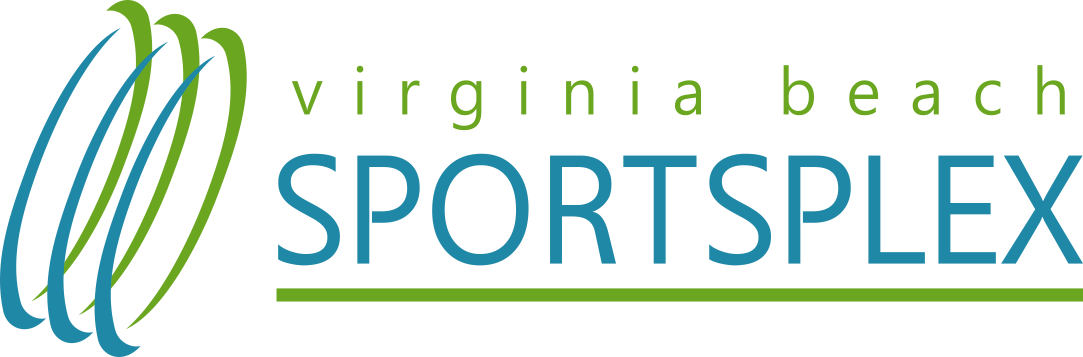

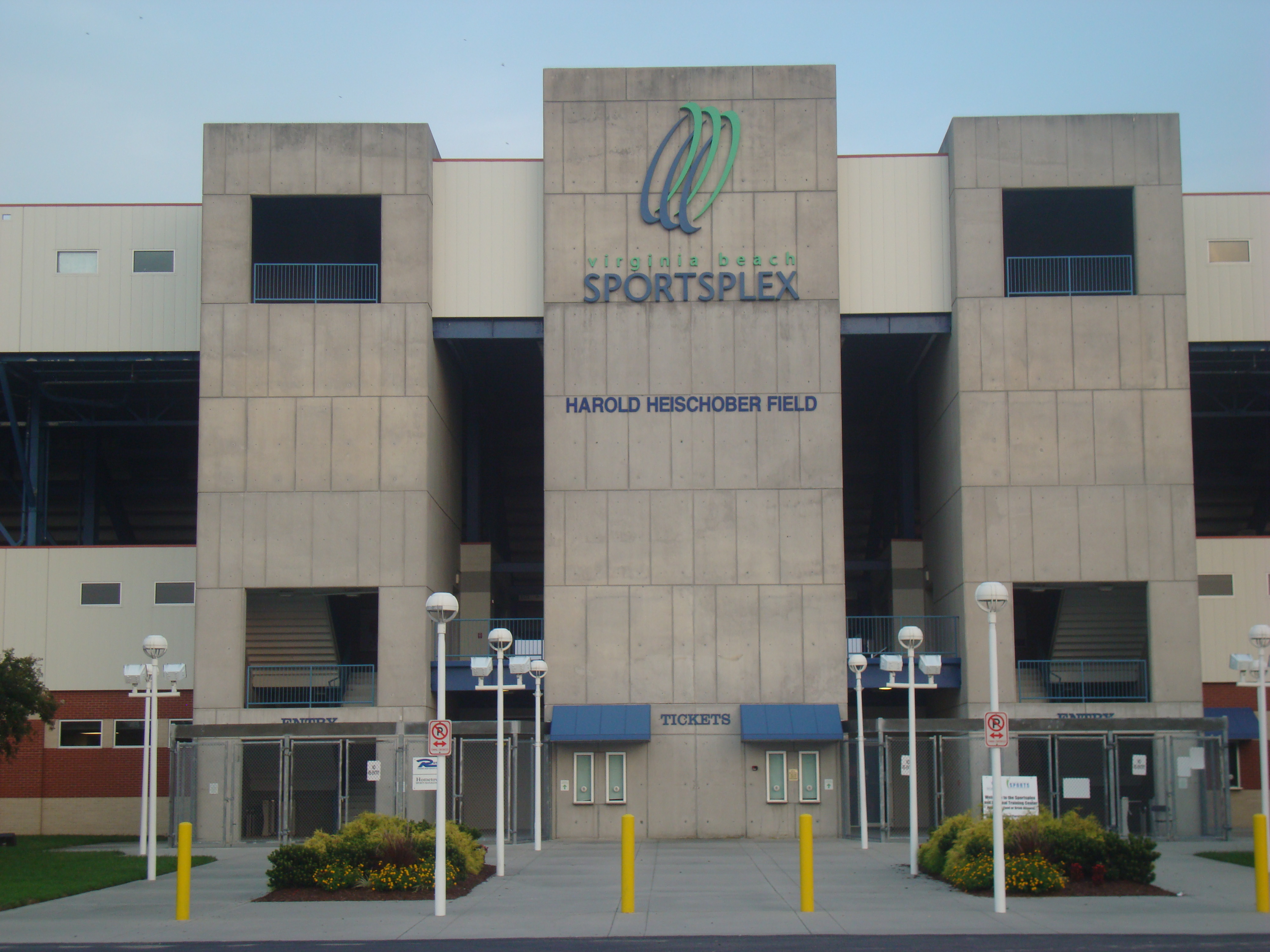
- Stone entrance to the stadium
- Interactive map of Virginia Beach Sportsplex
- Address: 2044 Landstown Centre Way; Virginia Beach; United States
- Owner: City of Virginia Beach
- Operator: Hometown Sports Management
- Capacity: 6,000 (expandable to 17,000)
- Type: Soccer-specific stadium
- Surface: PowerBlade
- Field size: 110 x 68 m
- Current use: Soccer; Football; Field hockey Rugby union

Construction
- Groundbreaking: 1996
- Opened: 1999; 27 years ago
- Cost: $6.8 million US$

Tenants
- Current: Virginia Beach United FC (USL2) (2019–present); Former: Virginia Beach Mariners (USL 1) (1999–2006); Hampton Roads Piranhas (W-League) (2000–2002, 2006); Virginia Beach Piranhas (USLPDL) (2006–2013); Virginia Destroyers (UFL) (2011–2012); Virginia Beach City FC (NPSL/WPSL) (2014–2019)

Website
- beachsportsplex.com

The Virginia Beach Sportsplex is a sports complex in Virginia Beach, Virginia. The name is most commonly attached to the main soccer-specific stadium within the complex, which opened in 1999. It has a permanent seating capacity of 6,000 on two decks of seating, though it can be expanded upwards to 17,000 for American football games. It was the first soccer-specific venue built from the ground up in the United States. The Sportsplex is located across the street from the Princess Anne Athletic Complex and near the Veterans United Home Loans Amphitheater.

The main stadium was the home field of the Hampton Roads Piranhas, a women's team in the W-League, which became the de facto top women's league in the country after the demise of the Women's United Soccer Association. It was originally their home from 1999 to 2002. In 2003 the Piranhas moved their home games to a smaller stadium on the campus of Virginia Wesleyan College near the city's border with Norfolk. It was also the home field for the Virginia Beach Mariners (USL-I) and the Virginia Beach Submariners (PDL).

In 2007, the franchise was terminated, and as a result the Piranhas acquired the Submariners and renamed them as the Piranhas, a reflection of their women's team. Both teams played at the Virginia Beach Sportsplex for the 2010 season of the W-League and the Premier Development League. The stadium is now the home office for the Virginia Rush Organization as well as the home venue for its U16 and U18 U.S. Soccer Development Academy teams. It is also home to the Norfolk Blues rugby team and Southern Virginian Trojans semi-pro football team. The stadium also hosted the Virginia Destroyers of the United Football League, which played two abbreviated seasons at the Sportsplex and for whom the stadium's capacity was doubled.

In 2009 the city of Virginia Beach turned over the Sportsplex to a private firm, Hometown Sports Management, who changed the soccer-only Bermuda grass field over to a more durable multi-sport friendly turf and paved the parking lot.

== Facilities ==
=== Sportsplex Stadium ===
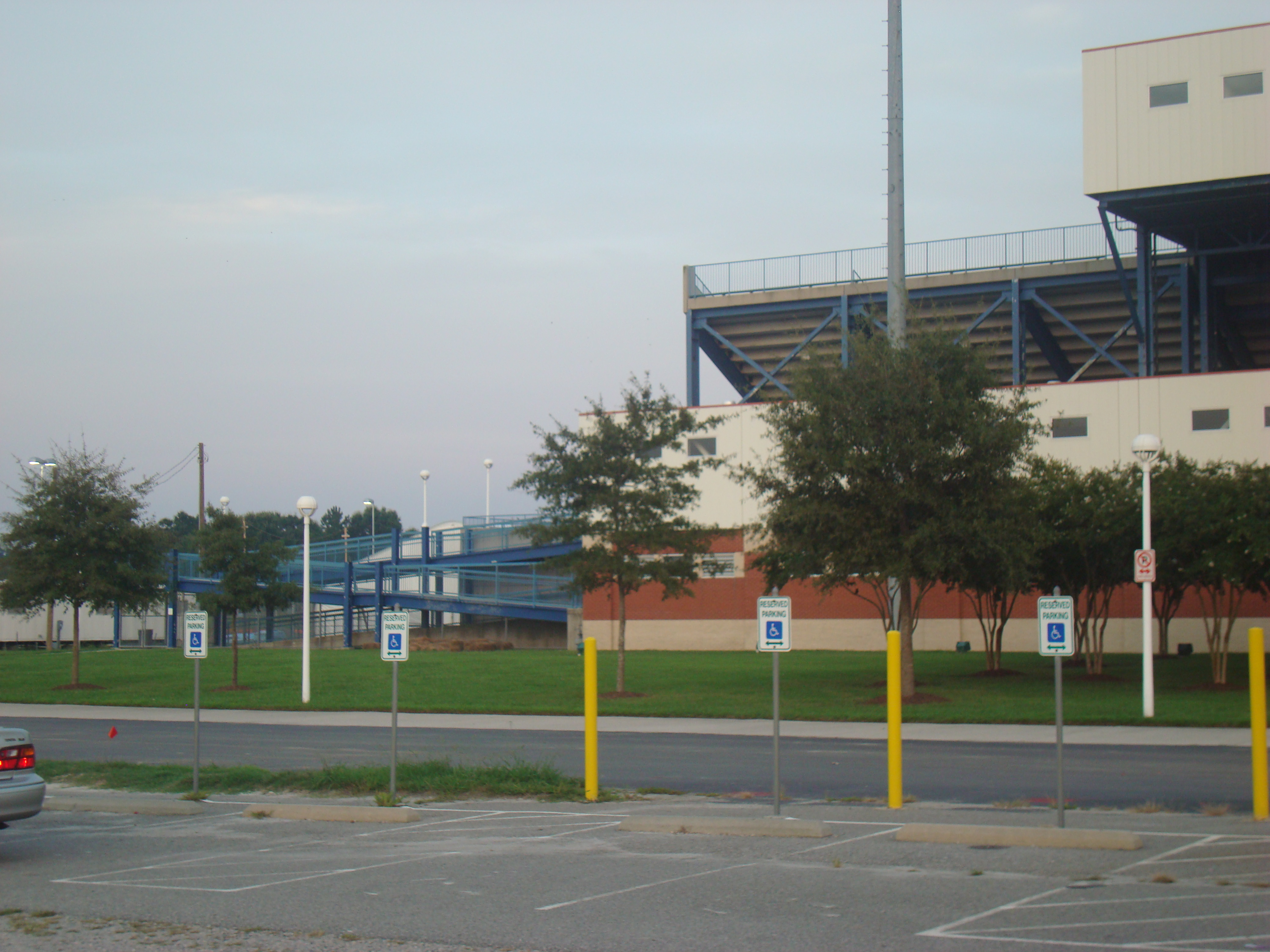
Exterior view as seen in 2010

The Sportsplex Stadium is a 3-level steel and concrete structure. The service level contains ticketing functions, an administration area, team and officials’ dressing rooms, and miscellaneous support spaces. The concourse level consists of a spectator walkway leading to the lower seating deck, concessions, and restroom areas. The club level leads to the upper seating deck, as well as six luxury suites and press boxes.

The playing field consists of an artificial turf surface, made with Sportexe's strengthen MonoTech fiber and PowerBlade HP. The playing surface has passed the testing requirements to qualify as a FIFA 1-Star surface and is sized to accommodate international soccer matches (75 yards x 120 yards), as well as other typical field events, including American football, field hockey, rugby, and lacrosse.

Field lighting is designed for both live spectators and televised recording, providing 100 foot-candles of illumination on the playing surface.

An on-site parking area is accessible from Landstown Road. A pedestrian walkway bisects the main parking areas, which contain a total of 2,122 spaces. Special areas near the stadium are reserved for handicapped parking. Parking space is also provided for buses, teams, and service personnel.

=== Sportsplex 5K Course ===
The Virginia Beach Sportsplex is a nationwide known 5K course. It hosts races such as Color me Rad, Dirty Girl Mud Run, Military Challenge, and Inflatable 5K. Starting off on the Sportsplex Turf going out behind to the City Property Limit and Virginia Beach National Golf Course, Around the Edge of the Sportsplex Athletic Fields, and around the Regional Training Center Fields, Finishing through the gates at the Smoke Pit.

=== Sportsplex Athletic Fields ===
The athletic fields are 3 acres of natural grass and plays host to many events such as youth soccer, lacrosse, and 5K runs.

=== Regional Training Center ===
The Sportsplex also contains the Regional Training Center, and is the regional training site for the United States women's national field hockey team which has two turf fields and its own office building. It also features lighting, locker rooms, parking, an equipment room, and a concession stand. Turf time is available for rent for field hockey events, camps, clinics and tournaments.

== Virginia Destroyers ==
On November 10, 2010, the Virginia Destroyers of the United Football League announced their home games would be played at the Sportsplex starting in Fall 2011. The UFL added temporary bleacher seating (recycled from the 2011 U.S. Open golf tournament) to expand the stadium to between 14,000 and 17,000 seats depending on demand. The Destroyers first game drew almost 13,000 fans to see a 34–17 Virginia win.

The Destroyers set an attendance record for the Sportsplex when 14,172 fans overflowed the stadium for the 2011 UFL Championship Game, which they won over the Las Vegas Locomotives, requiring the stadium to accommodate for standing room.

Along with the rest of the league, the Destroyers' attendance dropped precipitously during the 2012 season, prompting the league to again cut short its season. The Destroyers' business license expired March 1, 2013.
