= Omaha Nighthawks =

Defunct American football team

Helmet
Logo

General information
- Founded: 2010
- Folded: 2012
- Stadium: Johnny Rosenblatt Stadium (2010); TD Ameritrade Park Omaha (2011–2012)
- Headquartered: Omaha, Nebraska
- Colors: Metallic Silver, Omaha Black, Omaha Slate

Personnel
- Owner: Zach Nelson
- General manager: Matt Boockmeier

The Omaha Nighthawks were a professional American football team based in Omaha, Nebraska, which played in the United Football League, joining the league as an expansion team in 2010. During their first season, the Nighthawks played their home games at Johnny Rosenblatt Stadium before moving to TD Ameritrade Park Omaha for 2011 and beyond. Zach Nelson, CEO of Internet software provider NetSuite, was announced as lead owner in August 2010.

== Franchise history ==
=== 2010 season ===
On April 15, 2010, Omaha was granted an expansion team in the UFL, with former Boston College coach Jeff Jagodzinski being named the team's head coach. The team allowed fans to name the new team by either writing in a name or choosing from a preselected list (Mustangs, Spirit, Navigators or Stags). The Nighthawks name was officially unveiled on May 5, 2010, and won based on a strong write-in campaign. It was partially derived from the Lockheed F-117 Nighthawk, the retired stealth fighter used in the United States Air Force.

On September 21, the Tuesday before the team's first ever game, it was announced that a sellout crowd of 24,000 tickets were sold for the first time in UFL history, to watch the Nighthawks take on the Colonials in the franchise's first ever game. Omaha defeated the Colonials, 27–26.

On November 19, the Omaha Nighthawks played Florida in the UFL's first alternate uniform: a camouflage jersey was worn in honor of the Armed Forces.

On January 3, 2011, Jagodzinski was fired by the Nighthawks. Omaha chose to not renew his contract for the 2011 season as he led the Nighthawks to four straight losses to close out the season at 3–5, tied for last place in the league for 2010. Just nine days later, Joe Moglia was named team president and head coach. He was previously announced as the head coach for the expansion Virginia Destroyers.

=== 2012 season ===
Moglia departed the head coaching position with the Nighthawks in December 2011 to take the head coaching position at Coastal Carolina University, taking much of his staff with him. General manager Rick Mueller departed for the Philadelphia Eagles in January 2012.

Bart Andrus, former head coach of the NFL Europe Amsterdam Admirals, longtime NFL assistant and Moglia's offensive coordinator during the 2011 season, assumed the title of head coach and general manager on August 9, 2012.

For the 2012 season, all UFL games were slated to be broadcast by CBS Sports Network.

On October 20, 2012, the United Football League announced it would suspend all operations and intended on resuming the canceled schedule some time in spring 2013, with those games counting toward the 2012 season standings. The league never resumed in spring of 2013. In March 2013, 78 players filed suit against the league.

== Season-by-season records ==
Season	W	L	T	Pct.	Finish	Post Season	Awards
2010	3	5	0	.375	5th		
2011	1	3	0	.250	3rd	Lost Consolation Game (Sacramento Mountain Lions) 25-19 (OT)	
2012	2	2	0	.500	2nd	Season cancelled	
Totals	6	10	0	.375	-	-	-

=== Records vs. teams ===
This includes postseason games.

Team	Record	Percent
Las Vegas Locomotives	0-6	.000
Hartford Colonials	2-0	1.000
Sacramento Mountain Lions	3-1	.667
Florida Tuskers/Virginia Destroyers	1-3	.250

=== Home, away and neutral records ===
Location	Record	Percent
Home	3-6	.333
Away	3-6	.333
Neutral	0-0	.000

=== Starting quarterbacks ===
Regular season

Season(s)	Quarterback(s)	Notes	Ref
2010	Jeff Garcia (3–5)		
2011	Eric Crouch (0–1) / Jeremiah Masoli (1–2)		
2012	Jason Boltus (2–2)		

Postseason

Season(s)	Quarterback(s)	Notes	Ref
2011	Troy Smith (0–1)		
