= 2012 UFL season =

Fourth and final season of the United Football League

2012 United Football League season

Regular season
- Duration: September 26, 2012 – October 19, 2012

2012 UFL Championship Game
- Date
- Site
- Champion: Las Vegas Locomotives
- Runner-up: Omaha Nighthawks

The 2012 UFL season was the fourth and final season of the United Football League. Four teams began what was originally scheduled to be an eight-game schedule beginning September 26, 2012. The league ceased operations on October 20, 2012, after four weeks of extensive financial problems and dismal attendance figures. At the time of the cessation, the Las Vegas Locomotives had compiled a perfect season to date.

The league originally stated it would resume the season some time in spring 2013, but the majority of two teams' players filed legal action against the league that winter to claim unpaid salaries, and the league did not set up the necessary agreements to continue by the time spring 2013 had come along. One of the four teams (the Virginia Destroyers) allowed its business license to lapse and folded; the assets of the other franchises were stored in a warehouse in Florida, with the league being left in limbo since the suspension.

== Offseason developments ==
The league, which had coerced the resignation of commissioner Michael Huyghue after the 2011 season, had closed all of its offices and remained completely silent throughout most of winter, spring and early summer 2012, raising doubt about a potential 2012 season or even if the league, which had suffered heavy financial losses throughout its existence, would continue at all. League management rested with two of its owners, Bill Mayer and William Hambrecht, while football operations were handled by Las Vegas team president, head coach and general manager Jim Fassel.

For the first time in league history, there was no expansion, contraction, or relocation of any UFL franchises, with all four teams and markets returning from the previous season. The Hartford Colonials, which had been officially "suspended" prior to the 2011 season, did not return and were removed from the league's Web site.

On September 5, 2012, an anonymous source tipped The Virginian-Pilot that the start of the 2012 season, originally slated for September 19 on the schedule released July 26, would be delayed one week. The league confirmed the news the next day, also indicating that the championship game would be delayed two weeks instead of one. Difficulties in securing workman's compensation insurance prompted the delay. Players began reporting for training camp the week of September 17, with the abbreviated camps running through the following weekend.

By Week 2 of the regular season, the league began experiencing severe financial shortfalls, sparked in part by drastically reduced attendances at all three stadiums at which the league had played to that point (the Locomotives' Week 2 attendance at kickoff was only 601 fans), as well as the UFL's continued, systemic delays in payment stemming back to at least the 2010 season. The delayed payments (players were only paid $1,000 of the $7,000 owed to them after their first two games) prompted rumors of possible strike action or walkouts from the league's players beginning in Week 3. One agent who represented three UFL players went so far as to recommend that his clients not practice or play lest they risk injury. Virginia Destroyers owner and UFL president Bill Mayer and Sacramento owner Paul Pelosi in a joint on-air interview with CBS Sports Network on October 5, confirmed that the UFL had indeed not yet issued game checks to its players for 2012, but promised that the league would fulfill its wage obligations to its players and coaches. The Destroyers players again threatened to not play the week 4 contest without a personal guarantee of payment, which the ownership had not yet offered, and that the team's earlier promise of a payment by October 31 would not be sufficient. After the week 4 contests were held, and attendance continued to get even worse (the Virginia Destroyers' Week 4 home game was so poorly attended that the league refused to release an attendance total), the league suspended operations and arranged to pay for all of its players to return to their homes. As of November 3, 2012, the UFL still had not paid the players for their time; several players set a deadline for November 8 before pursuing legal action against the league.

=== Postseason litigation ===
On January 16, 2013, a coalition of approximately 70 players from the Nighthawks and Locomotives served papers to league owner William Hambrecht in order to file a class-action lawsuit to claim their pay. The Destroyers players also have not received any additional pay apart from the $1,000 they received during the season; player liaison Chris Greisen lost contact with Destroyers owner Bill Mayer shortly after the season ended. The Mountain Lions' players have been paid in full for their work. Hambrecht later demanded that the lawsuit be thrown out on a contract technicality that stated all pay disputes be resolved through a committee that, according to the players' attorney, does not even exist. A hearing on the lawsuit was scheduled for June 2013, at which point a Nevada judge turned the case over to a third-party arbiter. The players won the lawsuit and were awarded a combined $2.4 million in back pay in 2014, money that as of 2016 remained unpaid.

A separate lawsuit involves four assistant coaches of the Las Vegas Locomotives, who are also suing for unpaid salary. That lawsuit was also filed in January and is being handled by the same attorneys.

Yet another lawsuit was filed in July 2013, this one against Paul Pelosi. The five litigants in that case include former Mountain Lions defensive coordinator Chuck Bresnahan, who says he was not paid $250,000. Bresnahan eventually won the lawsuit and was paid for his services.

=== Rule changes for 2012 ===
Prior to the season, the UFL made two notable on-field rule changes: The league expanded each team's roster from 50 to 54 players, four of whom were designated as practice squad players. The league also moved its kickoffs back up from the 30-yard-line to the 35-yard-line, consistent with changes made by the NFL (in 2011) and NCAA (also in 2012).

=== Stadium changes ===
The Sacramento Mountain Lions, on August 6, announced that they would be moving to Raley Field, a baseball park in West Sacramento, California. The Mountain Lions, 2011's attendance leader, played their previous two seasons at Hornet Stadium in Sacramento but chose not to extend their two-year lease on that stadium.

The Virginia Destroyers returned to the Virginia Beach Sportsplex while the Omaha Nighthawks again played in TD Ameritrade Park. The Las Vegas Locomotives (which had previously contemplated a move to Salt Lake City) remained in Las Vegas despite poor attendance for its lone home game in 2011; the team ultimately played its two home games at University of Nevada, Las Vegas's Sam Boyd Stadium in Whitney after discussion and negotiations with Cashman Field, a Triple-A baseball stadium formerly home to the Las Vegas 51s (rebranded as the Las Vegas Aviattors and left Cashman Field in 2019. Only after the Locos paid back rent from the 2011 season did Sam Boyd Stadium agree to host the team for the 2012 season, but only for the first two games.

=== Coaching changes ===
Team	2012 Coach	2011 Coach	Reason for leaving	Story/Accomplishments
Omaha Nighthawks	Bart Andrus	Joe Moglia	Resigned	Moglia, who led the Nighthawks to a 1–4 (.200) record in his lone season as head coach (his first since leaving coaching to pursue a business career in the mid-1980s), left the league after the 2011 season to become head coach of the Coastal Carolina Chanticleers football team. Andrus, who was Moglia's offensive coordinator in 2011, had previously served as head coach of the Toronto Argonauts of the CFL in 2009 and the Amsterdam Admirals of NFL Europe from 2001 to 2007.
Sacramento Mountain Lions	Turk Schonert	Dennis Green	Contract dispute	Green, who coached the Mountain Lions from their founding as the California Redwoods in 2009 and accrued a record of 8–11 (.421) in those three seasons, sued the UFL and the Mountain Lions for breach of contract on October 7, 2011. It was speculated that Green, who previously proposed using legal action to try and take control of the Minnesota Vikings in 1997, may have used the legal maneuver to wrest control of the team away from the Paul Pelosi-led consortium that owned it. Green had previously won a $990,000 arbitral award for work during the 2011 season, and a San Francisco Superior Court judge upheld this award in February 2014. However, Green has not collected on the award because the league lacked the assets to cover the debt. Green then sued two investors in the UFL, Bill Hambrecht and Paul Pelosi. Both denied personal responsibility on account that neither had personally guaranteed Green's salary (unlike the other coaches), and the judge in the case sided with the owners. Green was appealing the lawsuit and also suing Hambrecht and Pelosi for fraud and emotional damages; he died before a ruling on those lawsuits could be made. This was Schonert's first ever head coaching position; his prior coaching positions have been almost exclusively at the level of quarterbacks coach.
Virginia Destroyers	Kurt Schottenheimer	Marty Schottenheimer	Contract dispute	In 2011, Marty Schottenheimer led the Destroyers to a 4–1 (.800) season and a UFL title, the only professional championship of his coaching career. Marty abruptly resigned shortly before the start of the 2012 season and handed the head coaching reins to his younger brother Kurt, who served as the team's defensive coordinator in 2011. Marty was, at the time of his resignation, said to be on good terms with the team but would, like Green, later file legal action against the league for failure to pay. Marty eventually was paid $800,000 in a settlement. Marty was also diagnosed with Alzheimer's disease at the same time. Kurt is in his first ever head coaching position, having spent most of his 30-year career as a defensive assistant. He agreed to work for the league for free in order to continue collecting his NFL pension.

=== Media changes ===
In 2011, the UFL lacked national exposure for its games after two-year deals with Versus and HDNet expired, with the league relying instead on limited regional TV coverage. On July 26, 2012, the league announced a broadcast deal with CBS Sports Network that would see the network carry all of the league's games in 2012. Though the deal with CBSSN returned the UFL to national TV exposure (albeit generally on less widely distributed premium cable and satellite tiers than the regional sports networks that the UFL had utilized in 2011), the league received no rights fee from the network and in fact paid the network upfront for production costs (roughly $150,000 per telecast). An additional caveat of the CBSSN deal prevented live games from being simulcast online, in contrast to the previous three seasons where all televised games had been carried on the Internet (the league's Webmaster had left the league after 2011 as well, which may have also been a factor in the discontinuation of both the Webcasts and the league's centralized Web site).

Local radio broadcasts were abandoned in Virginia and Las Vegas for 2012; radio deals for Omaha and Sacramento continued, however, with Nighthawks games airing on KOZN and the Mountain Lions being split between KHTK and KTKZ.

== Schedule ==
The eight-week 2012 UFL schedule (4 home and away games for each team) was originally announced on August 1, 2012. Due to the above mentioned delay, the league released a revised schedule (shown below) on September 6, essentially moving the original Week 1 games, which would have been played on September 19 and 21, to the end of the schedule (November 14 and 16). The Championship Game, which was originally scheduled for November 16, was also moved to December 1, skipping over the crowded Thanksgiving rivalry weekend (which the UFL had not done in 2009 or 2010) and allowing teams to have a two-week break between the end of the regular season and the title game, which would have been a first for the UFL. Two other firsts were also included in the schedule: no bye weeks were scheduled during the regular season, and each team was given an unbalanced schedule (3 games with two teams and 2 games with the third team).

Because of the suspension of the season on October 20, 2012, no games were played beyond that date. As of that date, each team had played every other team once and one team twice, with two home games and two away games.

Week	Date	Kickoff	Visitor	Home	Result	Site	Attendance	TV
1	Wednesday September 26	6:00 pm (PT)	Virginia Destroyers	Las Vegas Locomotives	VA 6, LV 19	Sam Boyd Stadium	2,500	CBS Sports Network
1	Friday September 28	8:00 pm (PT)	Omaha Nighthawks	Sacramento Mountain Lions	OMA 24, SAC 20	Raley Field	8,023	CBS Sports Network
2	Wednesday October 3	6:00 pm (PT)	Omaha Nighthawks	Las Vegas Locomotives	OMA 6, LV 41	Sam Boyd Stadium	601	CBS Sports Network
2	Friday October 5	7:00 pm (ET)	Sacramento Mountain Lions	Virginia Destroyers	SAC 29, VA 37	Virginia Beach Sportsplex	5,316	CBS Sports Network
3	Wednesday October 10	6:00 pm (PT)	Las Vegas Locomotives	Sacramento Mountain Lions	LV 20, SAC 9	Raley Field	5,210	CBS Sports Network
3	Friday October 12	7:00 pm (CT)	Virginia Destroyers	Omaha Nighthawks	VA 10, OMA 38	TD Ameritrade Park	3,563	CBS Sports Network
4	Wednesday October 17	8:00 pm (CT)	Las Vegas Locomotives	Omaha Nighthawks	LV 38, OMA 23	TD Ameritrade Park	2,234	CBS Sports Network
4	Friday October 19	9:00 pm (ET)	Sacramento Mountain Lions	Virginia Destroyers	SAC 20, VA 17	Virginia Beach Sportsplex	Not Released	CBS Sports Network

Had the season continued as scheduled, the remaining games would have been played as follows:

Week	Date	Kickoff	Visitor	Home	Site	TV
5	Tuesday October 23	8:00 pm (CT)	Sacramento Mountain Lions	Omaha Nighthawks	TD Ameritrade Park	CBS Sports Network
5	Thursday October 25	6:00 pm (ET)	Las Vegas Locomotives	Virginia Destroyers	Virginia Beach Sportsplex	CBS Sports Network
6	Wednesday October 31	6:00 pm (PT)	Omaha Nightawks	Las Vegas Locomotives	Sam Boyd Stadium	CBS Sports Network
6	Friday November 2	6:00 pm (PT)	Virginia Destroyers	Sacramento Mountain Lions	Raley Field	CBS Sports Network
7	Wednesday November 7	6:00 pm (PT)	Las Vegas Locomotives	Sacramento Mountain Lions	Raley Field	CBS Sports Network
7	Friday November 9	9:30 pm (ET)	Omaha Nighthawks	Virginia Destroyers	Virginia Beach Sportsplex	CBS Sports Network
8	Wednesday November 14	6:00 pm (PT)	Sacramento Mountain Lions	Las Vegas Locomotives	Sam Boyd Stadium	CBS Sports Network
8	Friday November 16	6:00 pm (CT)	Virginia Destroyers	Omaha Nighthawks	TD Ameritrade Park	CBS Sports Network

The 2012 UFL Championship Game would have been played on December 1 at 9:00 p.m. Eastern Time. No venue had been chosen for the game at the time of the cessation.

Attendance figures are based on gate draw, not ticket sales. The Locomotives sold 5,277 tickets for their Week 1 game and 3,500 for Week 2.

== Standings ==
United Football League
	W	L	T	PCT	PF	PA	STK
Las Vegas Locomotives	4	0	0	1.000	118	47	W4
Omaha Nighthawks	2	2	0	.500	94	109	L1
Virginia Destroyers	1	3	0	.250	70	106	L2
Sacramento Mountain Lions	1	3	0	.250	78	98	W1
