= Dermatome =

Dermatome may refer to:

- Dermatome (anatomy), an area of skin that is supplied by a single pair of dorsal roots
- Dermatome (embryology), the portion of the embryonic paraxial mesoderm, the somite, which gives rise to dermis
- Dermatome (instrument), a surgical instrument used to produce thin slices of skin
