= Clyde Wells =

Clyde Wells may refer to:

- Clyde Kirby Wells (born 1937), Canadian politician
- Clyde H. Wells (1916–1987), regent of the Texas A&M University System

== See also ==
- Wells (name)
