= Tusculum University =

Private university in Tusculum, Tennessee, U.S.

- Former name: List: Greeneville College (1794–1868); Tusculum Academy (1818–1844); Tusculum College (1844–1868); Greeneville & Tusculum College (1868–1908); Washington & Tusculum College (1908–1912); Tusculum College (1912–2018)
- Motto: Sit Lux (Latin) ("Let there be light")
- Type: Private university
- Established: 1794; 232 years ago
- Religious affiliation: Presbyterian Church (USA)
- Endowment: $17.6 million (2025)
- President: Scott Hummel
- Administrative staff: 272
- Undergraduates: 1,111
- Postgraduates: 192
- Location: Tusculum, Tennessee, U.S. 36.1730°N 82.7616°W
- Campus: Rural, 140 acres (0.57 km^{2})
- Colors: (Orange and black)
- Sporting affiliations: NCAA Division II; South Atlantic Conference; 18 sports teams
- Mascot: Pioneers
- Website: site.tusculum.edu
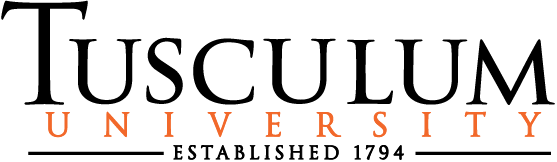

Tusculum University is a private Presbyterian university with its main campus in Tusculum, Tennessee. It is Tennessee's first university and the 28th-oldest operating college or university in the United States.

In addition to its main campus, the institution maintains a regional center for Adult and Online Studies in Knoxville, and Morristown.

== History ==
Samuel Doak and Hezekiah Balch sought the same goals through their separate colleges. They wanted to educate settlers of the American frontier so that they would become better Presbyterians, and therefore, in their thinking, better citizens.

In 1806, emancipated slave John Gloucester became the first African-American student to study at Greeneville College. He was the first African-American educated by a college in Tennessee and later helped found the First African Presbyterian Church in 1807, in Philadelphia.

Samuel Doak left Washington College (now Washington and Lee University) and founded Tusculum Academy, on the present campus of Tusculum University, in 1818 with his son, Samuel Witherspoon Doak.

=== Origin of name ===
S.W. Doak was named after Princeton University's then-president Dr. John Witherspoon, a signer of the United States Declaration of Independence and Tusculum Academy was named after Witherspoon's estate at the College of New Jersey (Princeton). The original Tusculum was a city near Rome, Italy, and home to Roman scholar and philosopher Cicero. It was he who, along with others, identified the civic virtues that form the basis of civic republican tradition, which emphasizes citizens working together to form good societies that in turn foster individuals of good character.

=== Presidents ===
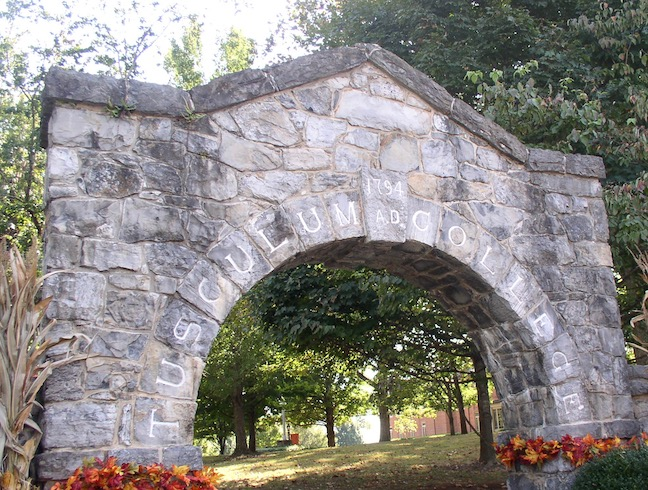
The entrance gate to Tusculum University, Tennessee

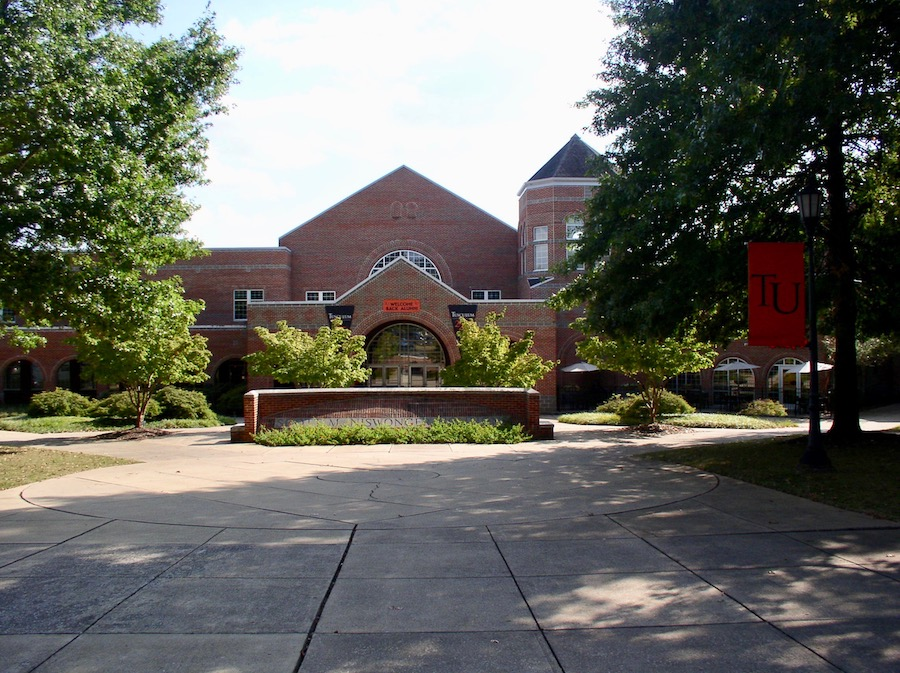
Scott Niswonger Student Center on the campus of Tusculum University

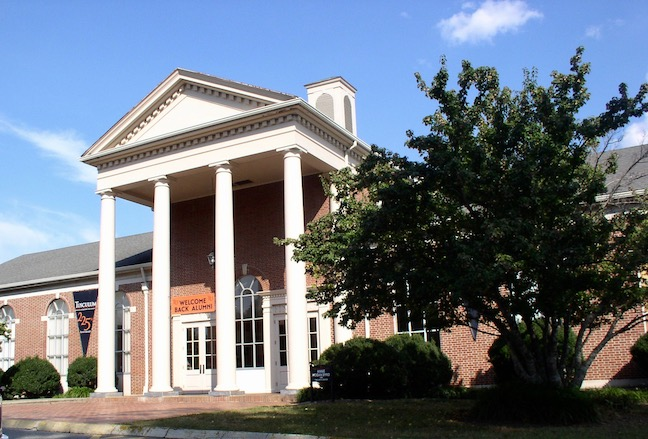
Annie Hogan Byrd Hall is a performance space used for both university theatre and music events as well as outside arts events

- Greeneville College (1794–1868)
  - Hezekiah Balch, 1794–1810
  - Charles Coffin, 1810–27
  - Henry Hoss 1828–36
  - Alfred Hoss 1836–38
  - James McLin, 1838–40
  - Samuel Matthews 1843–45
  - Charles Van Vlech 1845–46
  - John Fleming 1846–47
  - William B. Rankin, 1854–58
  - John Lampson 1859–60
- Tusculum Academy (1818–68)
  - Samuel Doak, 1818–29
  - Samuel Witherspoon Doak, 1829–44
- Tusculum College (1844–68)
  - Samuel Witherspoon Doak, 1844–64
  - William Stephenson Doak, 1865–68
- Greeneville and Tusculum College (G&T) (1868–1908)
  - William Stephenson Doak, (1868–82)
  - Alexander M. Doak, (acting) 1882–83
  - Jeremiah Moore, 1883–1901
  - Samuel A. Coile, 1901–07
- Washington and Tusculum College (W&T) (1908–1912)
  - Charles O. Gray, 1907–12
- Tusculum College (1912–2018)
  - Charles O. Gray, 1912–31
  - Charles A. Anderson, 1931–42
  - John McSween, 1942–44
  - Jere A. Moore, (acting) 1944–46
  - George K. Davies, 1946–50
  - Leslie K. Patton, (acting) 1950–51
  - Raymond C. Rankin, 1951–65
  - Douglas C. Trout, 1965–68
  - Charles J. Ping, (acting) 1968–69
  - Andrew N. Cothran, 1969–72
  - Thomas G. Voss, 1972–78
  - Earl R. Mezoff, 1978–88
  - Robert E. Knott, 1989–2000
  - Thomas J. Garland, (interim) 2000
  - Dolphus E. Henry III, 2000–07 (Note: The Tusculum College board of trustees placed President Dolphus Henry on paid administrative leave on May 22, 2007, following a vote of no confidence by the faculty. (See Tusculum College president on leave, Knoxville News Sentinel, 23 May 2007.) Two trustees with notable experience as university presidents (Drs. Edward J. Kormondy and Angelo Volpe) alternately shared leadership responsibilities until an interim president could take office. (See Trustees Volpe, Kormondy taking on transitional presidential leadership at Tusculum College, Tusculum College press release, May 29, 2007.) Dr. Henry announced his resignation in July 2007. (See Dolphus Henry resigns as president of Tusculum College, Tusculum College press release, 19 July 2007.))
  - Russell L. Nichols, (interim) August 2007–April 2009 (Note: Dr. Russell L. Nichols, president emeritus of Hanover College, assumed the duties of interim president on 1 August 2007. (See Dr. Russell L. Nichols coming as interim president of Tusculum College, Tusculum College press release, July 19, 2007.))
  - Nancy B. Moody, April 2009 – 2017 (Note: On February 28, 2009, the Tusculum College board of trustees elected Dr. Nancy B. Moody, president of Lincoln Memorial University, to be the institution's 27th president. She was scheduled to assume office on April 27, 2009. (See Tusculum College Names Dr. Nancy Moody President, Greeneville Sun, March 2, 2009.))
  - James L. Hurley, 2017–2019
- Tusculum University (2018–present)
  - James L. Hurley, 2017–2019
  - Greg Nelson, (acting) 2019–2020
  - Scott Hummel, 2020–present

== Academics ==
Academic rankings

Master's
- Washington Monthly: 341 of 604

Regional
- U.S. News & World Report: 86 (tie) of 90

Tusculum is accredited by the Southern Association of Colleges and Schools to award associate, baccalaureate and master's degrees.

== Athletics ==
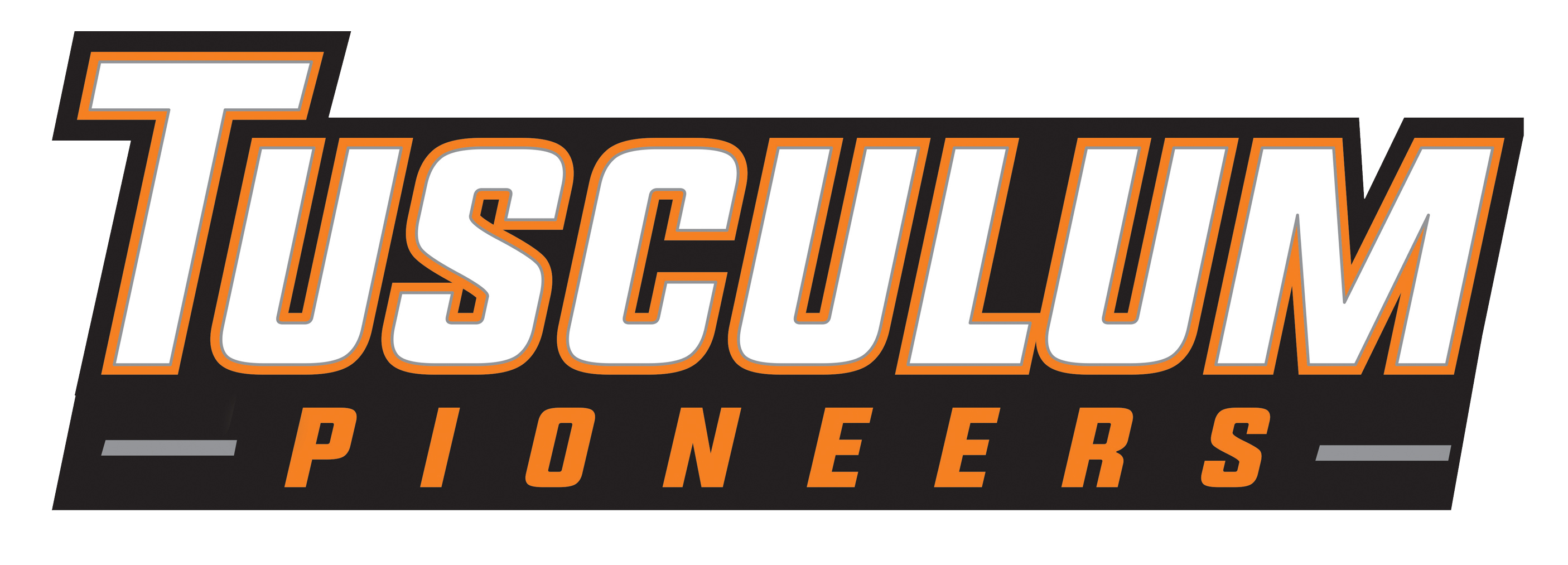
Tusculum Athletics wordmark

The Tusculum athletic teams are called the Pioneers. The university is a member of the Division II ranks of the National Collegiate Athletic Association (NCAA), primarily competing in the South Atlantic Conference since the 1998–99 academic year.

Tusculum fields 24 recognized varsity sports teams: Men's sports include baseball, basketball, bowling, cross country, cheerleading, football, golf, lacrosse, soccer, tennis, track & field and volleyball; while women's sports include basketball, beach volleyball, bowling, cross country, cheerleading, golf, lacrosse, soccer, softball, tennis, track & field and volleyball.

=== Overview ===
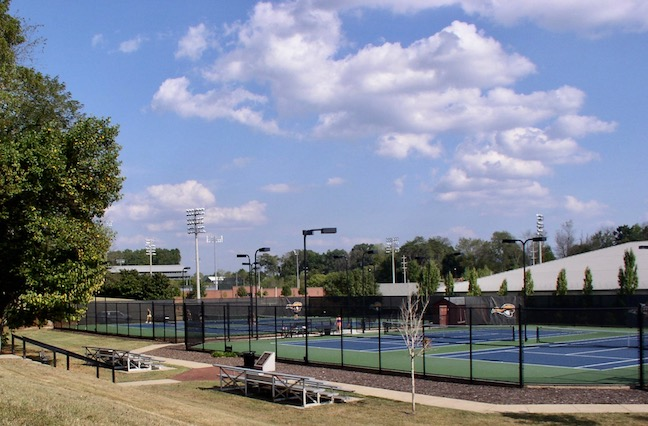
The tennis courts and athletic buildings on the campus of Tusculum University

Although most of those sponsored sports compete in NCAA D-II in the SAC, two teams compete as de facto NCAA Division I members. In women's bowling, a sport added in 2019–20 in which the NCAA holds a single championship open to members of all three NCAA divisions, the Pioneers are single-sport members of the Conference Carolinas. Also added for 2019–20 was men's volleyball, in which the NCAA holds a combined Division I/II national championship; the Pioneers compete in that sport as an independent. Tusculum also added the non-NCAA sport of men's bowling in 2019–20, and also recognizes its cheerleaders (both male and female) as varsity athletes.

In 2004, Ricardo Colclough, a defensive back and kick returner, became the first Tusculum Pioneers football player to be drafted by the National Football League when he was selected in the second draft round by the Pittsburgh Steelers. Colclough, the first Tusculum player to appear in an NFL game, played for the Carolina Panthers. He was dismissed from the team in August 2008.

In 2007, former Tusculum College basketball player, Tyler White, became a member of the Washington Generals, the exhibition team that travels with and plays against the Harlem Globetrotters.

In August 2009, Chris Poore, another former Tusculum College basketball player, also became a member of the Washington Generals.

On September 4, 2014, the Tusculum football team hosted the College of Faith, an online institution in Charlotte, North Carolina. In a 71–0 win, the Pioneers set two NCAA all Division records: fewest total yards allowed (minus-100) and fewest rushing yards allowed (minus-124). Tusculum also had three safeties, which tied a Division II record.

== Notable people ==
=== Alumni ===
- Stu Aberdeen (1935–1979), American college men's basketball coach; head coach, Marshall University
- Alexander Outlaw Anderson (1794–1869), United States senator from Tennessee; later served in the California State Senate and on the California Supreme Court
- William Coleman Anderson (1853–1902), U.S. Representative from Tennessee
- DeAundre Alford (b. 1997), defensive back for the Buffalo Bills of the National Football League
- James D. Black (1849–1938), Governor of Kentucky in 1919
- Vincent Boreing (1839–1903), U.S. Representative from Kentucky
- Roe Campbell (1900–1988), Football and Basketball player for the University of Tennessee, member of Tusculum College's Sports Hall of Fame
- Robert Looney Caruthers (1800–1882), judge, politician, U.S. Representative from Tennessee
- Ricardo Colclough (b. 1982), cornerback in the National Football League
- Steve Crane (b. 1972), former English football player
- Brandon Dickson (b. 1984), Major League Baseball pitcher for the St. Louis Cardinals
- Henry Dircks (1806–1873) (Honorary degree, 1868), English engineer who is considered to have been the main designer of the projection technique known as Pepper's ghost in 1858
- James Dobson (1920–1987) Broadway, film and television actor
- Cyrus Fees (b. 1982), mixed martial arts/pro wrestling TV announcer
- John Frederick Fulbeck (1916–2011), prominent poet and professor of comparative literature at the California State Polytechnic University, Pomona
- John Harvey Girdner (1856–1933), Prominent New York surgeon who attended President James Garfield after Garfield was shot in 1881; inventor of a "telephonic bullet probe" that came into use before the first x-rays and a pioneer in skin grafting; author of Newyorkitis
- Cho Gyeong-chul (1929–2010), South Korean astronomer who worked at NASA and the US Naval Observatory
- Joan B. Hague (b. 1929), member of the New York State Assembly from 1979 to 1982
- David B. Hawk (b. 1968), member of the Tennessee House of Representatives
- Thomas Gray Hull (1926–2008), United States district judge, legal counsel to Governor Lamar Alexander of Tennessee from 1979 to 1981
- Spencer Jarnagin (1792–1853), United States senator from Tennessee from 1843 to 1847
- Anup Kaphle Nepalese journalist; executive editor, Rest of World; previously worked for The Atlantic, The Washington Post, BuzzFeed News and led The Kathmandu Post as editor-in-chief
- Tommy Kilby (b. 1964), member of the Tennessee Senate
- Richard Kollmar (1910–1971), Actor, television personality, stage producer and director
- Pryor Lea (1794–1879), U.S. Representative from Tennessee
- Marianne W. Lewis (b. 1967), academic; Dean, Carl H. Lindner College of Business, the University of Cincinnati; previously, dean, Cass Business School in London, England
- Oscar Lovette (1871–1934), U.S. Representative from Tennessee
- William McFarland (1821–1900), U.S. Representative from Tennessee
- Samuel Milligan (1814–1874), Justice of the Tennessee Supreme Court and a Judge of the Court of Claims
- Diana da Costa Neves (b. 1987) (attended, transferred to Vanguard University), Australian-Portuguese professional basketball player
- Park Overall (b. 1957), actress and 2012 Democratic candidate for United States Senate seat held by Bob Corker
- David Trotter Patterson (1818–1891), judge, United States senator from Tennessee
- Lucas Paulini (b. 1989, Buenos Aires, Argentina), former professional soccer player in the United States
- Charles Ready (1802–1878), lawyer, member of Tennessee House of Representatives, member of the United States House of Representatives
- Harry L. Sears (1920–2002), member of the New Jersey Senate
- Eddie Smith (b. 1979), politician, former member of Tennessee House of Representatives, current member of Tennessee Public Charter School Commission
- George Caldwell Taylor (1885–1952), federal judge on the U.S. District Court for the Eastern District of Tennessee
- Oliver Perry Temple (1820–1907) (attended, two years), attorney, author, judge, and economic promoter in East Tennessee in the latter half of the 19th century
- Dave Tollett, head baseball coach of Florida Gulf Coast
- John White (Kentucky politician) (1802–1845), 15th Speaker of the United States House of Representatives, member of Kentucky House of Representatives
- John Henry Wilson (1846–1923), U.S. Representative from Kentucky

=== Faculty ===
- Millar Burrows (1889–1980), American biblical scholar, leading authority on Dead Sea Scrolls
- Michael Taylor (glass artist) (b. 1944), Prominent artist known for geometric fused glass sculptures
