= Steve Fryar =

American rodeo cowboy

Steve Fryar (January 31, 1953 – January 10, 2017), was a professional rodeo cowboy.

== College career ==
In 1977 he was the College National Finals Rodeo steer wrestling champion and southwestern regional champion for Tarleton State University. He graduated from Tarleton State University with a degree in agriculture.

== Professional career ==
He had a 20-year professional career from 1975-1995 highlighted by a qualification to the 1980 National Finals Rodeo.

== Personal life ==
His daughter, Stephanie Fryar, qualified for the 2008 National Finals Rodeo. he died in 2017 aged 63.
