= Jack Fulbeck =

American poet

John Frederick Fulbeck (December 19, 1916 – December 25, 2011) was an American poet and professor of comparative literature at the California State Polytechnic University, Pomona. He served two terms as president of the California State Poetry Society. His poems have won numerous awards, such as "Apostrophe to Amour" and "Introspection in the Cold" which won first prizes in California state level poetry contests, and "In Fuente Vaqueros" which won an international grand prize. His poem "Challengers" was read by Taylor Wang from the orbiting Space Shuttle Challenger in 1985 and is on record at the National Archives Building. He authored three books of poetry: I Sleep With Strangers, Gilgamesh, and Sifted Ashes.

Fulbeck was born in New York City and raised in Bloomfield, New Jersey. He attended Tusculum College in Tennessee on a New Jersey State Scholarship. Following the bombing of Pearl Harbor, he enlisted in the United States Navy and was stationed as a fighter pilot in the South Pacific. After the end of World War II, he worked as a newspaper and magazine editor and a freelance writer. In 1960, Fulbeck received his Ph.D. in Comparative Literature from the University of Southern California and married Seckyue Mary Chan and adopted her two children, Josephine and David. His third child, Kip Fulbeck, was born in 1965.
