= Skin grafting =

Surgical transplantation of skin

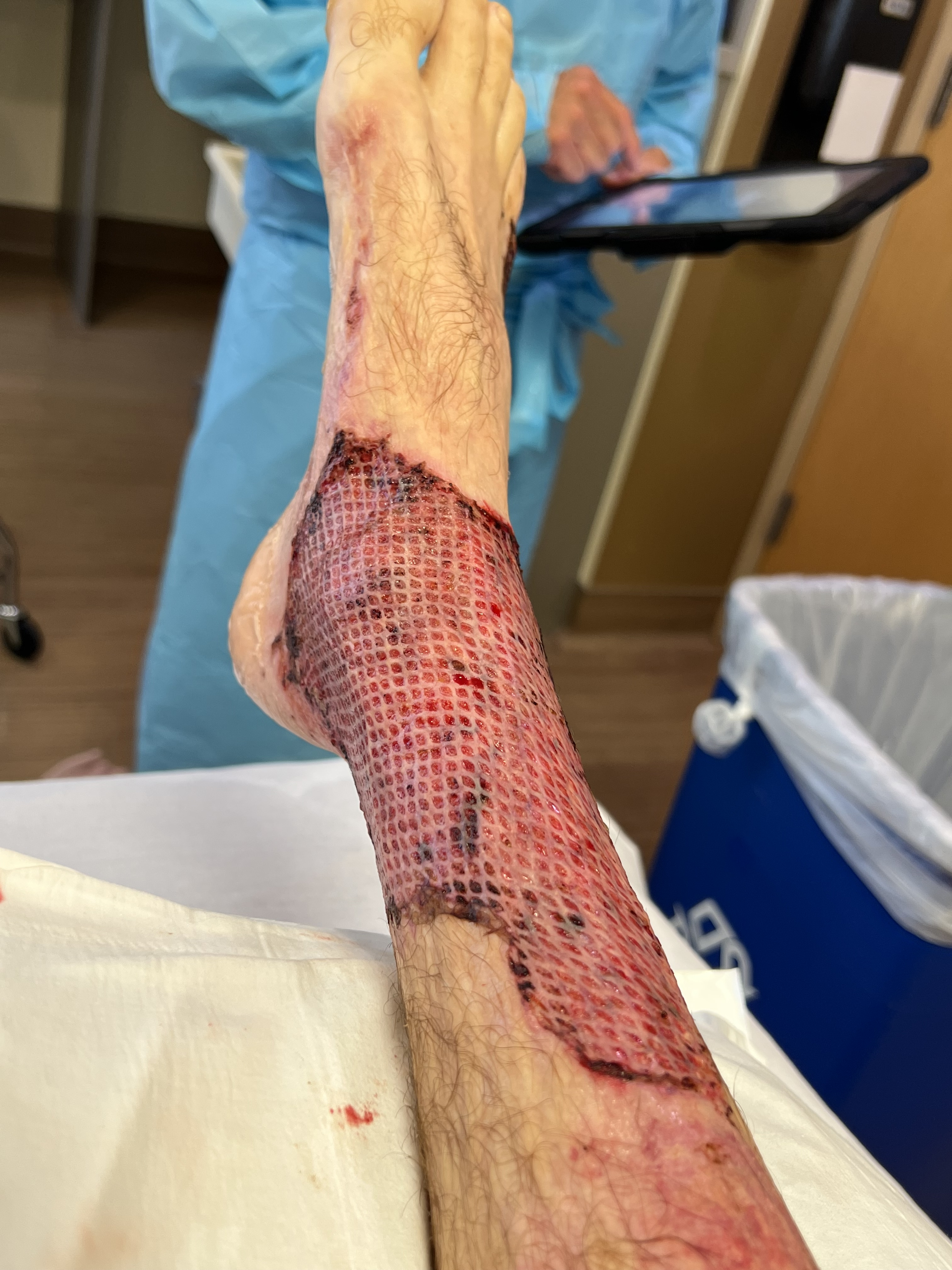
- Skin graft performed on the ankle due to third degree burns
- ICD-9-CM: 86.6
- MedlinePlus: 002982

Skin grafting, a type of graft surgery, involves the transplantation of skin without a defined circulation. The transplanted tissue is called a skin graft.

Surgeons may use skin grafting to treat:

- extensive wounding or trauma
- burns
- areas of extensive skin loss due to infection such as necrotizing fasciitis or purpura fulminans
- specific surgeries that may require skin grafts for healing to occur – most commonly removal of skin cancers

Skin grafting often takes place after serious injuries when some of the body's skin is damaged. Surgical removal (excision or debridement) of the damaged skin is followed by skin grafting. The grafting serves two purposes: reducing the course of treatment needed (and time in the hospital), and improving the function and appearance of the area of the body which receives the skin graft.

There are two types of skin grafts:

- Partial-thickness: The more common type involves removing a thin layer of skin from a healthy part of the body (the donor section).
- Full-thickness: Involves excising a defined area of skin, with a depth of excision down to the fat. The full thickness portion of skin is then placed at the recipient site.

A full-thickness skin graft is more risky, in terms of the body accepting the skin, yet it leaves only a scar line on the donor section, similar to a Cesarean-section scar. In the case of full-thickness skin grafts, the donor section will often heal much more quickly than the injury and causes less pain than a partial-thickness skin graft. A partial thickness donor site must heal by re-epithelialization which can be painful and take an extensive length of time.

== Medical uses ==
Two layers of skin created from animal sources has been found to be useful in venous leg ulcers.

== Classification ==
Grafts can be classified by their thickness, the source, and the purpose. By source:

- Autologous: The donor skin is taken from a different site on the same individual's body (also known as an autograft).
- Isogeneic: The donor and recipient individuals are genetically identical (e.g., monozygotic twins, animals of a single inbred strain; isograft or syngraft).
- Allogeneic: The donor and recipient are of the same species (human→human, dog→dog; allograft).
- Xenogeneic: The donor and recipient are of different species (e.g., bovine cartilage; pig skin; xenograft or heterograft).
- Prosthetic: Lost tissue is replaced with synthetic materials such as metal, plastic, or ceramic (prosthetic implants).

Allografts, xenografts, and prosthetic grafts are usually used as temporary skin substitutes, that is a wound dressing for preventing infection and fluid loss. They will eventually need to be removed as the body starts to reject the foreign material. Autologous grafts and some forms of treated allografts can be left on permanently without rejection. Genetically modified pigs can produce allograft-equivalent skin material, and tilapia skin is used as an experimental cheap xenograft in places where porcine skin is unavailable and in veterinary medicine.

By thickness:

Split-thickness
A split-thickness skin graft (STSG) includes the epidermis and part of the dermis. Its thickness depends on the donor site and the needs of the person receiving the graft. It can be processed through a skin mesher which makes apertures onto the graft, allowing it to expand up to four times its size. For larger expansions the modified MEEK technique can be used, allowing it to expand up to nine times its size. Split-thickness grafts are frequently used as they can cover large areas and the rate of autorejection is low. The same site can be harvested again after six weeks. The donor site heals by re-epithelialisation from the dermis and surrounding skin and requires dressings.
Full-thickness
A full-thickness skin graft consists of the epidermis and the entire thickness of the dermis. The donor site is either sutured closed directly or covered by a split-thickness skin graft.
Composite graft
A composite graft is a small graft containing skin and underlying cartilage or other tissue. Donor sites include, for example, ear skin and cartilage to reconstruct nasal alar rim defects.

== Donor selection ==
When grafts are taken from other animals, they are known as heterografts or xenografts. By definition, they are temporary biologic dressings which the body will reject within days to a few weeks. They are useful in reducing the bacterial concentration of an open wound, as well as reducing fluid loss.

For more extensive tissue loss, a full-thickness skin graft, which includes the entire thickness of the skin, may be necessary. This is often performed for defects of the face and hand where contraction of the graft should be minimized. The general rule is that the thicker the graft, the less the contraction and deformity.

Cell cultured epithelial autograft (CEA) procedures take skin cells from the person needing the graft to grow new skin cells in sheets in a laboratory; because the cells are taken from the person, that person's immune system will not reject them. However, because these sheets are very thin (only a few cell layers thick) they do not stand up to trauma, and the "take" is often less than 100%. Newer grafting procedures combine CEA with a dermal matrix for more support.Research is investigating the possibilities of combining CEA and a dermal matrix in one product.

Experimental procedures are being tested for burn victims using stem cells in solution which are applied to the burned area using a skin cell gun. Recent advances have been successful in applying the cells without damage.

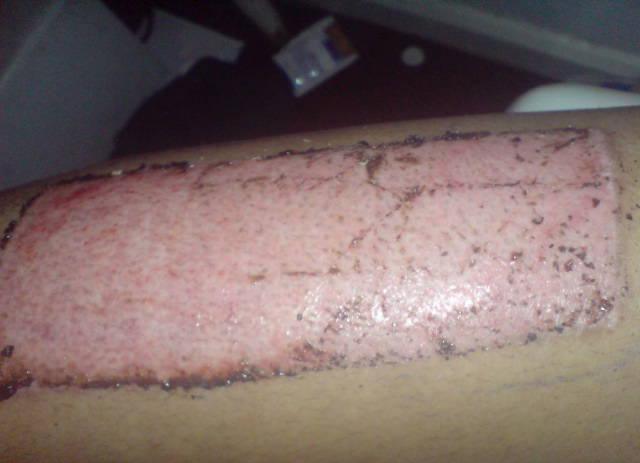
Split-thickness skin graft donor site eight days after removal of the skin

In order to remove the thin and well preserved skin slices and strips from the donor, surgeons use a special surgical instrument called a dermatome. This usually produces a split-thickness skin graft, which contains the epidermis with only a portion of the dermis. The dermis left behind at the donor site contains hair follicles and sebaceous glands, both of which contain epidermal cells which gradually proliferate out to form a new layer of epidermis. The donor site may be extremely painful and vulnerable to infection. There are several ways to treat donor site pain. These include subcutaneous anesthetic agents, topical anesthetic agents, and certain types of wound dressings.

== Healing process ==
=== Stages of healing ===
The graft is carefully spread on the bare area to be covered. It is held in place by a few small stitches or surgical staples. The healing process for skin grafts typically occurs in three stages: plasmatic imbibition, capillary inosculation, and neovascularization.

During the first 24 hours, the graft is initially nourished by a process called plasmatic imbibition in which the graft "drinks plasma" (i.e., absorbs nutrients from the underlying recipient bed).

Between 2 and 3 days, new blood vessels begin growing from the recipient area into the transplanted skin in a process called capillary inosculation.

Between 4 and 7 days, neovascularization occurs in which new blood vessels form between the graft and the recipient tissues.

=== Other ===
To prevent the accumulation of fluid under the graft which can prevent its attachment and revascularization, the graft is frequently meshed by making lengthwise rows of short, interrupted cuts, each a few millimeters long, with each row offset by half a cut length like bricks in a wall. In addition to allowing for drainage, this allows the graft to both stretch and cover a larger area as well as to more closely approximate the contours of the recipient area. However, it results in a rather pebbled appearance upon healing that may ultimately look less aesthetically pleasing.

An increasingly common aid to both pre-operative wound maintenance and post-operative graft healing is the use of negative pressure wound therapy (NPWT). This system works by placing a section of foam cut to size over the wound, then laying a perforated tube onto the foam. The arrangement is then secured with bandages. A vacuum unit then creates negative pressure, sealing the edges of the wound to the foam, and drawing out excess blood and fluids. This process typically helps to maintain cleanliness in the graft site, promotes the development of new blood vessels, and increases the chances of the graft successfully taking. NPWT can also be used between debridement and graft operations to assist an infected wound in remaining clean for a period of time before new skin is applied. Skin grafting can also be seen as a skin transplant.

== Z-plasty ==
This is based upon the principle of mobilizing a full segment of skin from an area to the site needing tissue replacement. The flaps are triangularly shaped opposite each other. It can be used in direct excision and closure of a contracted scar to produce a better looking and healing scar. It helps to elongate and break up a linear scar. It also gives a good result in the release of linear contractures. Z-plasty is of paramount importance to the plastic surgeon and a frequently used method in both single multiple forms.

== Risks ==
Risks for the skin graft surgery are:

- Bleeding
- Infection
- Loss of grafted skin
- Nerve damage
- Graft-versus-host disease
- Marjolin's ulcer

Rejection may occur in xenografts. To prevent this, the person receiving the graft usually must be treated with long-term immunosuppressant drugs.

== Prognosis ==
Most skin grafts are successful, but in some cases grafts do not heal well and may require repeat grafting. The graft should also be monitored for good circulation.

Recovery time from skin grafting can be long. Graft recipients wear compression garments for several months and are at risk for depression and anxiety consequent to long-term pain and loss of function.

== History ==
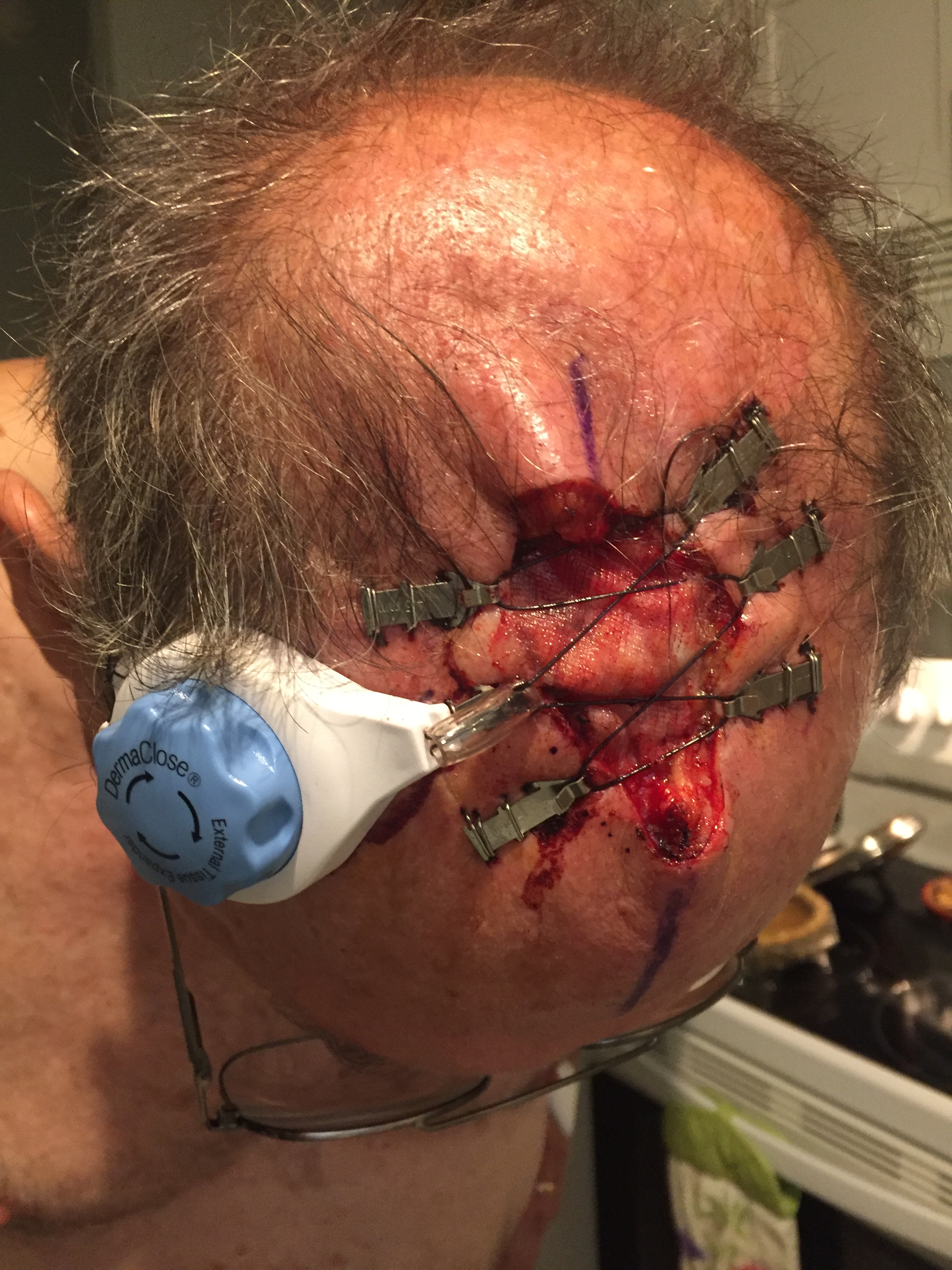
A device called a DermaClose is used to help large wounds to heal, either in conjunction with a skin graft (as in this example) or as an alternative healing aid.

Skin grafting, in more rudimentary forms, has been practiced since ancient times. The Ebers Papyrus of ancient Egypt contains a brief treatise on xenografting. Around 500 years later, members of the Hindu Kamma caste are described as performing skin grafts which included the usage of subcutaneous fat. The 2nd century AD Greek philosopher Celsus is also known to have developed a method to reconstruct the foreskins of Jewish men using skin grafts, as circumcision was considered barbaric in Greek and Roman society.

More modern uses of skin grafting were described in the mid-to-late 19th century, including Reverdin's use of the pinch graft in 1869; Ollier's and Thiersch's uses of the split-thickness graft in 1872 and 1886, respectively; and Wolfe's and Krause's use of the full-thickness graft in 1875 and 1893, respectively. John Harvey Girdner demonstrated skin graft transplant from a deceased donor in 1880. Today, skin grafting is commonly used in dermatologic surgery. Recently Reverdin's technique is used but with very small wounds (less than 3 mm diameter). Such small wounds heal in a short time without scars. This technique is called SkinDot.

== Alternatives to skin grafting ==
There are alternatives to skin grafting including skin substitutes using cells from patients, skin from other animals, such as pigs, known as Xenograft and medical devices that help to close large wounds. Xenograft was originally known as "zoografting." Other animals that can be used include dogs, rabbits, frogs, and cats, with the greatest success achieved with porcine skin. Other skin substitutes include Allograft, Biobrane, TransCyte, Integra, AlloDerm, Cultured epithelial autografts (CEA).

There are medical devices that help close large wounds. The device uses skin anchors that are attached to healthy skin. An adjustable tension controller then exerts a constant pulling tension on sutures looped around the skin anchors. The device gradually closes the wound over time.

== Experimental techniques ==
"Microcolumn grafting" is a new grafting method being researched that uses needles to take autologous skin biopsies from the patient & implant them in the wound site.

== See also ==
- Tissue engineering
