= Texan Corps of Cadets =

Student military organization

Corps of Cadets
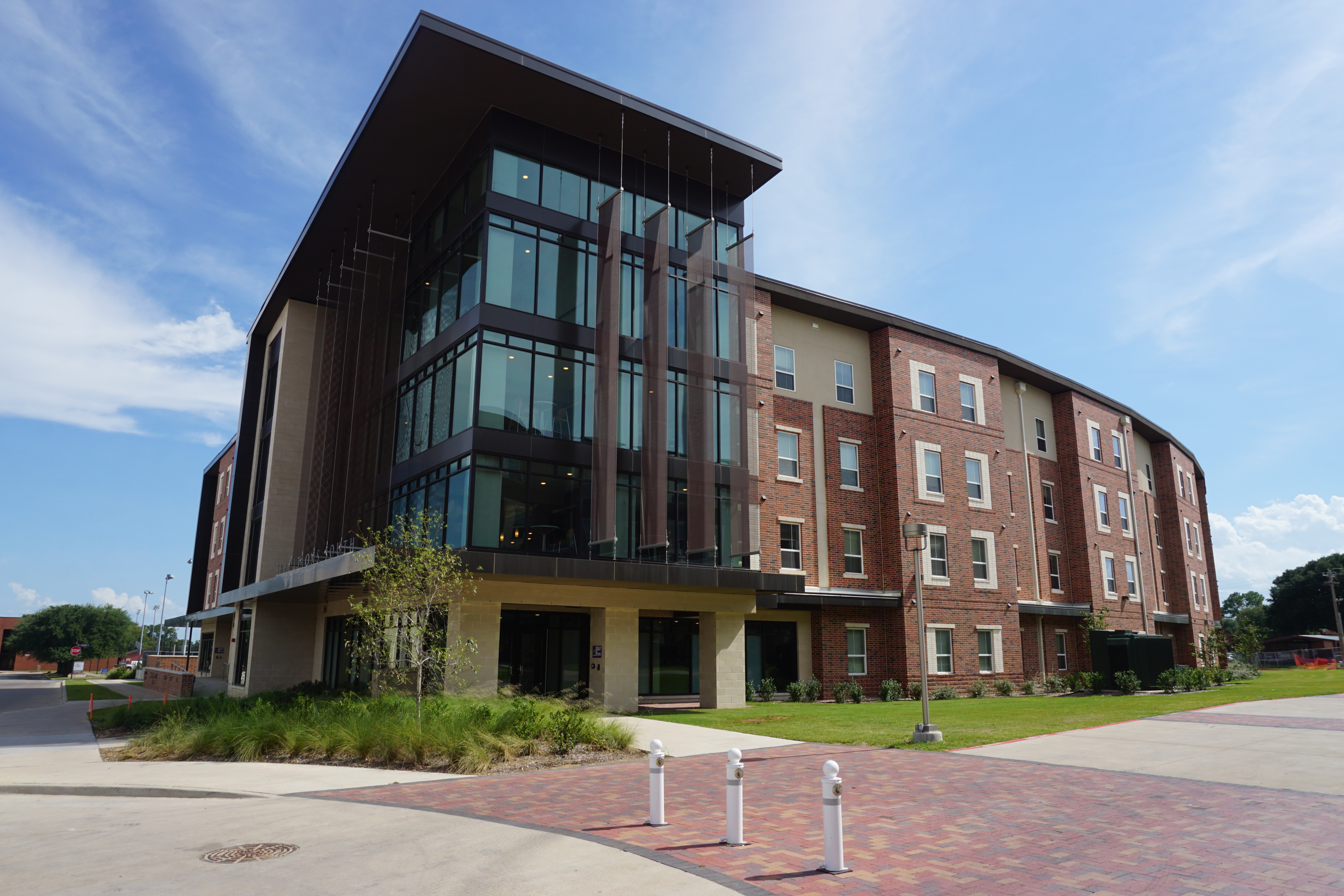
- The Corps of Cadets residence hall at Traditions South.
- Active: 2016 − present
- Country: United States
- Allegiance: Texas
- Type: Cadet Corps
- Role: Officer Training/Leadership Development
- Part of: Tarleton State University
- Garrison/HQ: Stephenville, Texas
- Colors: purple and white
- Website: https://www.tarleton.edu/cadets/

Commanders
- Dean of the Leadership and Military College and Commandant of Cadets: Colonel Douglas Simon

The Texan Corps of Cadets is a student military organization at Tarleton State University located on the university's main campus in Stephenville, Texas. Tarleton's original Corps of Cadets traces its roots to 1917 but was reactivated in 2016 after becoming inactive in the 1950s. Tarleton is a member of the Association of Military Colleges & Schools of the United States.

== Cadet life ==
=== Military service ===
Members of the Texan Corps of Cadets are not required to serve in the military upon completion of the program or their degree. Since 1917 Tarleton has participated in the Senior Reserve Officers’ Training Corps (ROTC) which does require a commitment for military service upon graduation. While separate programs, they are both administered by the Leadership and Military College.

Cadets may pursue programs for US Army, US Air Force, and US Marine Corps.

=== Organization ===
The Texan Corps of Cadets consists of a Battalion Headquarters and Headquarters Company (HHC), Alpha Company, and Bravo Company. The Corps is led by a Cadet Colonel and Cadet Command Sergeant Major while HHC and Companies are led by a Cadet Captain and Cadet First Sergeants. The Headquarters and Headquarters Company contains all Corps Level Staff and their assistants along with any MS5 and Green to Gold Active-Duty Option (ADO) Cadets. Alpha and Bravo Company both consist of two platoons of cadets led by a Cadet Second Lieutenant and either a Cadet Staff Sergeant or Sergeant First Class. Each Platoon typically consists of approximately 25 cadets broken down into three squads. Each squad consists of two teams led by a second or third year cadet Squad Leader, and each team consists of two-four freshmen led by a second year Team Leader.

=== Cadet uniforms ===
Members of the Corps of Cadets wear distinctive uniforms around campus in order to show their membership within the program. Cadets will wear different uniforms depending on the day of the week, events of the day, or any special details they may be a part of.

Unit	Description
Class A uniform	This is the highest level of Cadet Dress and is reserved for special events such as Brass Ceremony and the annual Military ball.
Class B Summer Uniform	The class B Summer uniform is worn by cadets during all business hours on Monday, Tuesday, and Friday. The wear of the Class B Variants follows the observation of daylight savings with the summer uniform (Whites) being worn March–November. Senior cadets are authorized to wear their Senior Straw Hats with this uniform.
Class B Winter Uniform	The class B Winter uniform is worn by cadets during all business hours on Monday, Tuesday, and Friday. The wear of the Class B Variants follows the observation of daylight savings with the winter uniform (Midnights) being worn November–March. Senior cadets are authorized to wear their Senior Felt Hats with this uniform.
Utility Uniforms	Cadets wear the Army Combat Uniform (ACU) in the Operational Camouflage Pattern (OCP) with differences based on ROTC affiliation. All non-contracted cadets wear OCPs with Tarleton State Branch Tapes and T-Shield Patches on both sleeves. Army Contracted Cadets wear OCPs with US Army Branch Tapes and the Army Cadet Command Unit Patch. Airforce Contracted Cadets wear OCPs with US Airforce Branch Tapes and the AFRTOC Patch. Marine PLC Contracted Cadets wear OCPs with Tarleton State Branch Tapes and the US Marine Corps OCS/PLC patch. All contracted cadets wear a T Shield patch on the right sleeve underneath the US Flag.
Purple Thursdays Polo	On Thursdays cadets wear a Purple Corps of Cadets Polo shirt with khaki pants. Senior cadets are authorized to wear their senior boots and hats in this uniform.
Gameday Uniform	The Gameday Uniform is a modified OCP uniform that drops the blouse and has cadets wear their purple Gameday t-shirt. This uniform is worn to various school events and all Sports events.
Physical Training Uniform	The PT uniform is worn during morning PT on Monday, Tuesday and Thursday. Contracted cadets will wear the PT uniform of their Branch on Tuesday.

== Special teams and academics ==
The Texan Corps of Cadets offers students an opportunity to obtain a minor in Leadership Studies. All cadets live together in a residence hall at Tarleton called Traditions South. All cadets wear their uniforms to class every day and must abide by the regulations set forth in the "Chisel".

=== Special units ===
Unit	Description
Rudder's Riders	Rudder's Riders manages the collection of cannons used by the Corps for various school and community events. These Cannons include: "Doc's Revival" (3-inch M1905 Field Gun), a 75mm Pack Howitzer, a silver training cannon, and the inert original 3-inch M1902 cannon on display in front of the Education building.
Grill Sergeants	Texan Corps Grill Team; Provides Tailgate Meals and Serves Local Community
Ranger Challenge	Ranger Challenge is the Army ROTC varsity sport. Teams form early in the semester and train rigorously nearly every morning of the week in order to prepare for Taskforce and Brigade competitions. Teams compete at these levels in order to secure a slot to the Sandhurst Military Skills Competition at the United States Military Academy at West Point.
Wainwright Rifles Drill Team	The Wainwright Rifles Drill Team was established at Tarleton in 1949. It is the Drill Team for the Corps of Cadets that specializes in Ceremonial and Exhibition Drill. Events consist of Rifle Salutes and Participation in various campus events.

== Commandant of Cadets ==
- Colonel Kenny Weldon (1 July 2015 - 1 July 2022)
- Colonel Douglas Simon (since 1 July 2022)
