= Ricardo Colclough =

American football player (born 1983)

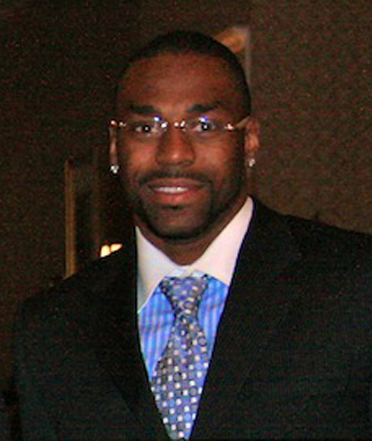
- Colclough in 2007

No. 21, 30, 23, 26, 27, 28
- Position: Cornerback

Personal information
- Born: September 26, 1983 (age 43); Sumter, South Carolina, U.S.
- Listed height: 5 ft 11 in (1.80 m)
- Listed weight: 194 lb (88 kg)

Career information
- High school: Sumter (SC)
- College: Kilgore (2001); Tusculum (2002–2003)
- NFL draft: 2004: 2nd round, 38th overall pick

Career history
- Pittsburgh Steelers (2004–2007); Cleveland Browns (2007); Carolina Panthers (2008)*; Kansas City Chiefs (2008–2009); Omaha Nighthawks (2010–2011); Edmonton Eskimos (2012); Hamilton Tiger-Cats (2012–2013); Toronto Argonauts (2013)
- * Offseason or practice squad member only

Awards and highlights
- Super Bowl champion (XL)

Career NFL statistics
- Total tackles: 74
- Sacks: 2.5
- Forced fumbles: 2
- Pass deflections: 5
- Interceptions: 1
- Return yards: 1,084
- Stats at Pro Football Reference

Ricardo Sanchez Colclough (/koʊkˈliː/ Kol-Klah; born September 26, 1983) is an American former professional football player who was a cornerback in the National Football League (NFL), United Football League (UFL), and Canadian Football League (CFL). He was selected by the Pittsburgh Steelers in the second round of the 2004 NFL draft. He played college football at Kilgore College for one season (2001) under head coach Jimmy Rieves on an undefeated NJCAA football team, then played at Tusculum.

Colclough earned a Super Bowl ring with the Steelers in Super Bowl XL. He was also a member of the Cleveland Browns, Carolina Panthers, and Kansas City Chiefs of the NFL, the Omaha Nighthawks of the UFL, and the Edmonton Eskimos, Hamilton Tiger-Cats, and Toronto Argonauts of the CFL.

== Professional career ==
=== Pittsburgh Steelers ===
Colclough was selected with the 38th overall pick in the second round of the 2004 NFL draft out of Tusculum College. He is perhaps best known for his momentum-shifting muffed punt in week three of the 2006 season. With the Steelers up 17 to 14 against the Cincinnati Bengals, Colclough was back for a punt with roughly eight minutes remaining. He attempted to field the punt by raising his hands above his head, then dropping the punt. He and teammate Tyrone Carter, a free safety, both had a chance to recover, but both failed. One play after the miscue, the Bengals' quarterback, Carson Palmer, hit wide receiver T. J. Houshmandzadeh for a score. The Steelers ended up losing the game, 28–20.

Colclough was put on the injured reserve list in early October of the 2006 NFL season. On October 30, 2007, Colclough was released by the Steelers after appearing in three games.

=== Cleveland Browns ===
The next day, he was claimed off waivers by the Cleveland Browns. He was with the team the rest of the 2007 season, but did not play in any games for the Browns before becoming a free agent.

=== Carolina Panthers ===
On March 1, 2008, Colclough signed a two-year, $4 million contract with the Carolina Panthers. Colclough was released by the Panthers on August 30, 2008, hours after receiving a DWI.

=== Kansas City Chiefs ===
Colclough was signed by the Kansas City Chiefs on November 5, 2008. He was waived on September 29, 2009.

=== Omaha Nighthawks ===
Colclough was signed by the Omaha Nighthawks in 2010. He was re-signed by the team on July 15, 2011.

=== Edmonton Eskimos ===
On March 12, 2012, Colclough signed with the Edmonton Eskimos of the Canadian Football League. In two games, he recorded 6 tackles.

=== Hamilton Tiger-Cats ===
On September 13, 2012, Colclough was traded from the Eskimos to the Hamilton Tiger-Cats along with a 6th round pick the CFL draft for non-import fullback Darcy Brown. Colclough was released by the Tiger-Cats on July 18, 2013

=== Toronto Argonauts ===
On July 23, 2013, Colclough signed with the Toronto Argonauts. He was released by the Argonauts on May 26, 2014.
