= James L. Hurley =

American academic administrator

16th President of Tarleton State University
- Incumbent
- Assumed office August 2019
- Preceded by: F. Dominic Dottavio

28th President of Tusculum University
- In office October 2017 – August 2019
- Preceded by: Scott Hummel
- Succeeded by: Nancy B. Moody

20th President of University of Pikeville
- In office 2013–2015
- Preceded by: Paul E. Patton

Personal details
- Spouse: Kindall Hurley
- Education: University of Pikeville (BA); Indiana University Bloomington (MEd); Morehead State University (Doctorate)
- Profession: University Administrator

James L. Hurley is an American academic administrator who is President of Tarleton State University.

== Biography ==
Hurley earned his bachelor's degree in business education and management from the University of Pikeville, a master’s degree in education from Indiana University Bloomington, and a doctorate in education from Morehead State University. He completed the Institute for Presidential Leadership at Harvard University and received a certificate of higher education management from Vanderbilt University.

Prior to his appointment at Tarleton, Hurley was president of Tusculum University in Greenville, Tennessee.

Hurley serves on the Board of Trustees of the Southern Association of Colleges and Schools Commission on Colleges, the Council of Public University Presidents, the WAC Executive Board, and the Chancellor's Executive Committee.

Hurley and his wife, Kindall, have four children.

== Recognition ==
In 2023, Fort Worth Inc. magazine included him on their list of 400 most influential North Texans. In 2022, he received a Distinguished Education Leadership Award from the North Texas Commission. Also that year, Tarleton State was invited to join the Association of Public & Land-grant Universities.
