= Barry B. Thompson =

American academic and administrator

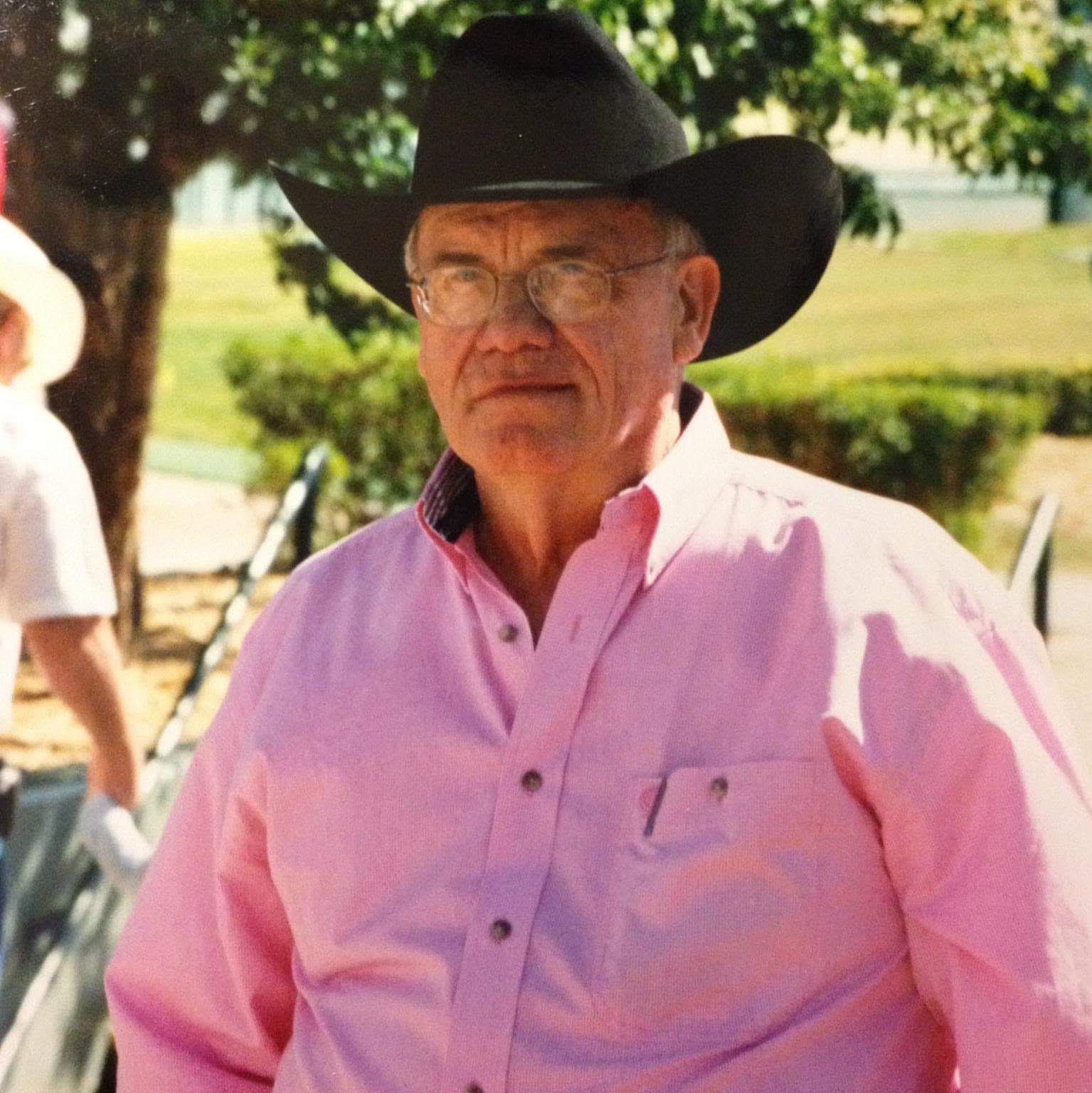
Barry B. Thompson

Barry Baird Thompson (May 12, 1936 – March 1, 2014) was an American academic and administrator who served as the chancellor for the Texas A&M University System from 1994 to 1999. Prior to being named chancellor, he served as president of Tarleton State University and West Texas A&M University. He was named the chancellor emeritus upon his retirement in 1999.

== Education and career ==
Thompson earned an associate degree from Tarleton State and a bachelor's degree in Biology and secondary education from Texas Tech University in Lubbock, Texas. Thompson earned a master's degree in administration from East Texas State University (now East Texas A&M University). Following a stint in public schools as a teacher and administrator, he earned a doctorate from Texas A&M University while serving as a professor at Pan American University in Edinburg, Texas. Thompson was a professor and department head at East Texas State University before being named the vice president for academic affairs. He joined Tarleton State University(a member of the Texas A&M University System) in a newly created position of executive vice president under president W.O. Trogdon. Upon Trogdon's retirement in 1982, Thompson was named 13th president of Tarleton and held the position until 1990. During his time as president, the university's enrollment and fundraising increased substantially.

Thompson resigned as the Tarleton president at the request of leaders of the Texas A&M University System to become president of the West Texas State University as it became a member of the Texas A&M University System on September 1, 1990. Thompson led the university during a time of transition from an independent institution to a member of the statewide system. In 1993, the name of the university was changed to West Texas A&M University to reflect this change in status. In 1994, Thompson left West Texas to become chancellor of the system. He served as chancellor until his retirement in 1999, and was succeeded by Howard D. Graves. In total, he worked in Texas public education for 44 years.

== Honors and awards ==
Thompson was the recipient of several honors:

- Texas Science Teacher of the Year in 1960
- Golden Deeds in Education Award in 1996
- Mirabeau Lamar Medal for outstanding leadership in higher education in 1999
- Boy Scouts of America Silver Beaver Award
- Tarleton State University distinguished alumni award in 1996
- Texas A&M University-Commerce distinguished alumni award

The Barry B. Thompson Student Center on the campus of Tarleton State University is named after Thompson.

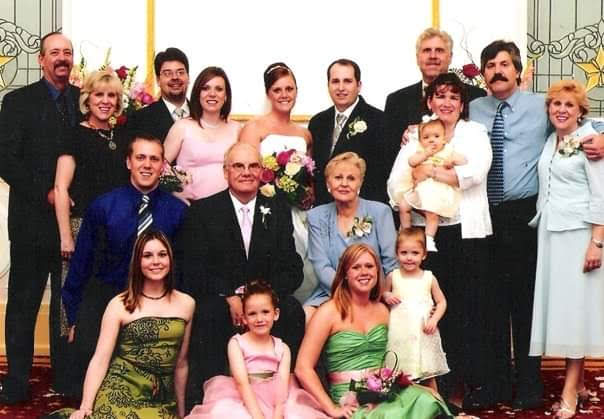
The Barry B. Thompson Family

The Wallace-Meyers Wedding, 2007

== Personal life ==
Thompson was born on May 12, 1936, in Pecos, Texas. He married his high school sweetheart Sandra Sue Davison in 1955 and had four children: Karol, Kim, Scott, and Bart.
