= Tarleton State University =

Public university in Stephenville, Texas, US

Coordinates: 32.2139°N 98.2154°W

- Former names: The John Tarleton College (1899–1917); John Tarleton Agricultural College (1917–1949); Tarleton State College (1949–1973)
- Type: Public research university
- Established: September 7, 1899; 127 years ago
- Parent institution: Texas A&M University System
- Endowment: $112 million (2024)
- President: James L. Hurley
- Students: 17,258 (fall 2024)
- Undergraduates: 12,012
- Postgraduates: 2,080
- Location: Stephenville, Texas, U.S.
- Campus: Rural
- Colors: Purple & white
- Nickname: Texans
- Sporting affiliations: NCAA Division I – WAC; UAC
- Website: www.tarleton.edu

Tarleton State University is a public research university in Stephenville, Texas, United States. It is a founding member of the Texas A&M University System and had 17,258 students as of fall of 2024. It is classified among "R2: Doctoral Universities – High research activity".

== History ==
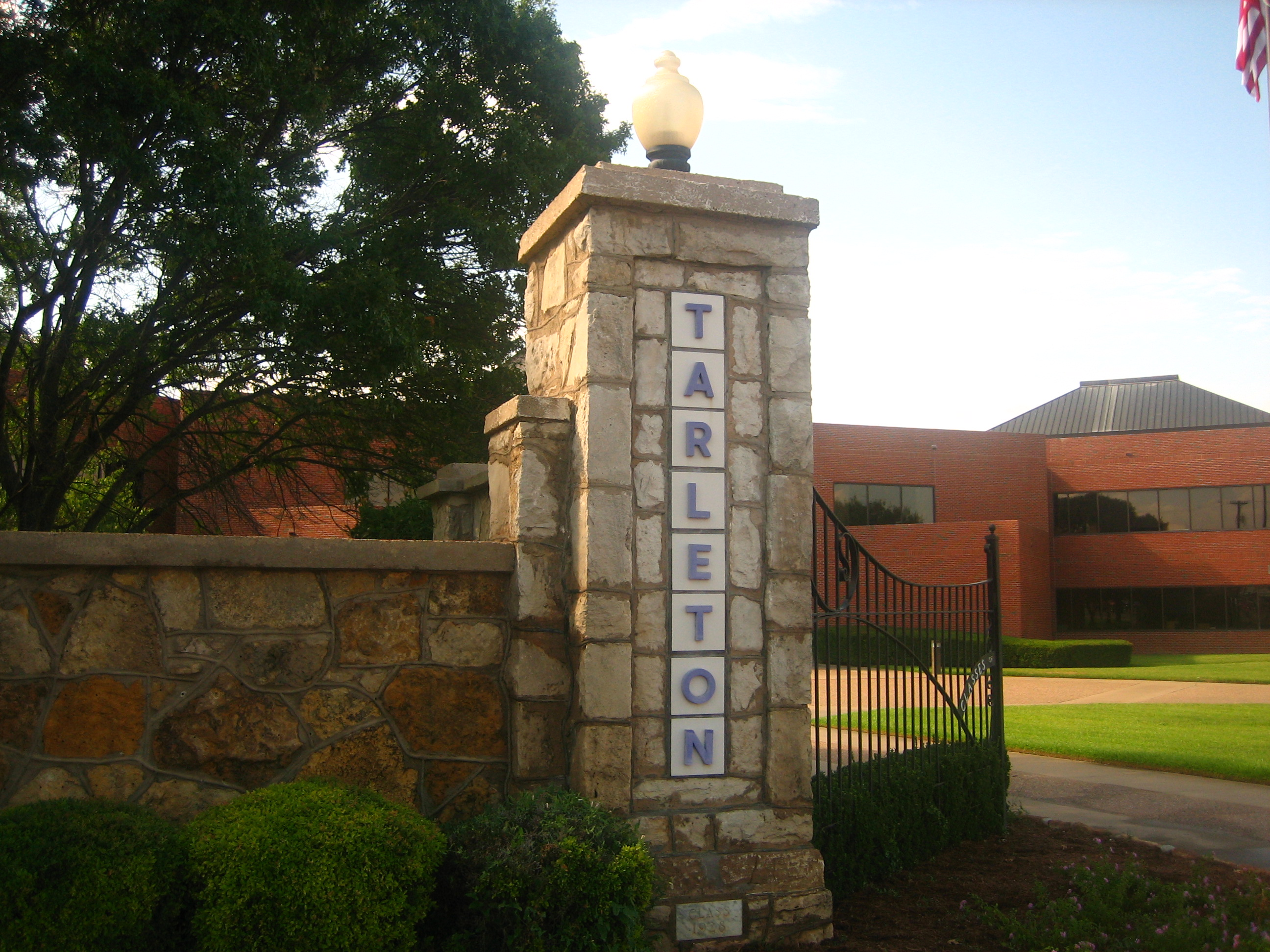
Entrance sign to Tarleton State University in Stephenville, Texas

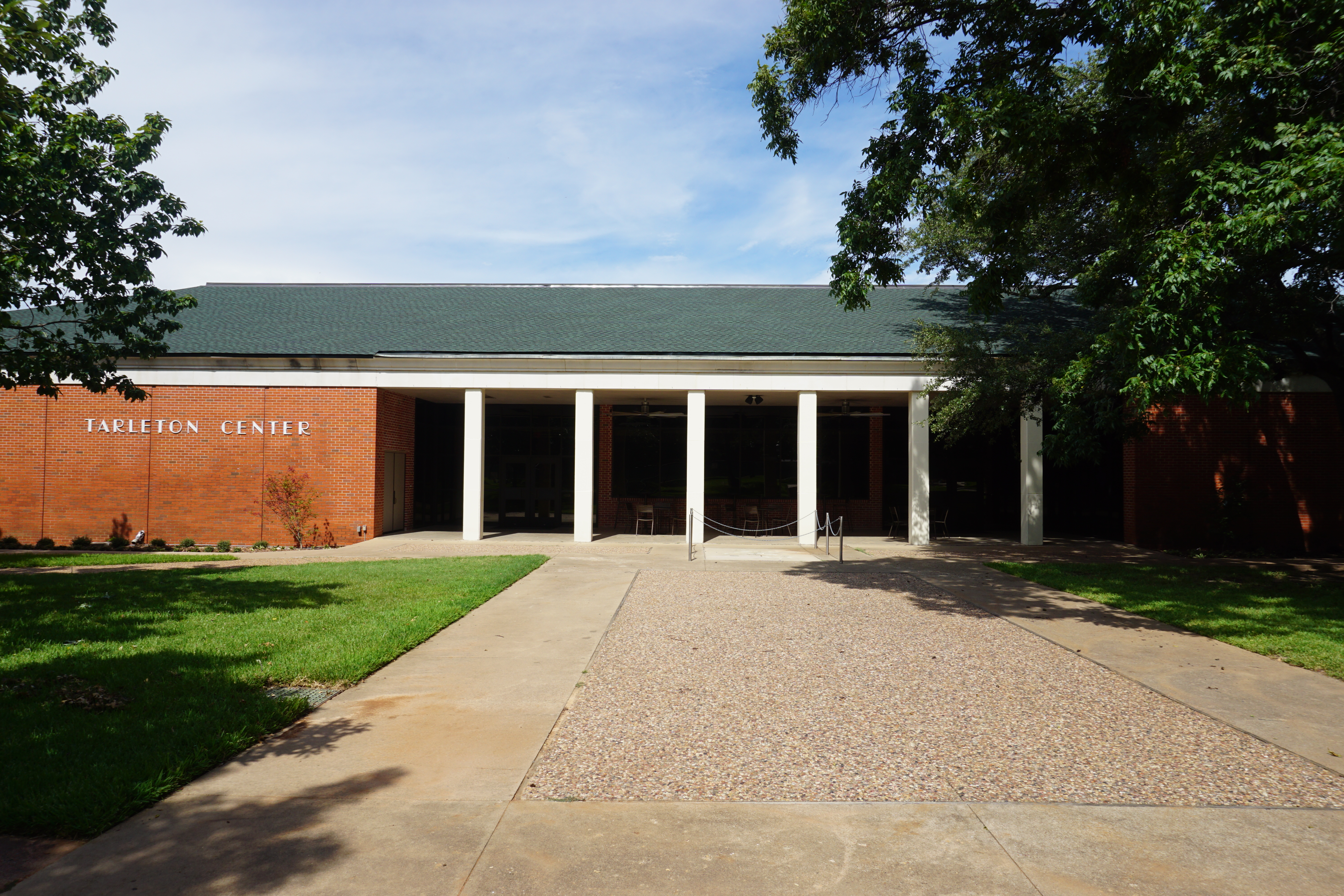
Tarleton Center

John Tarleton College was founded in 1887 with an endowment from settler John Tarleton. In 1917, Texas State Representative and Stephenville resident Henry Clark co-authored and presented legislation establishing John Tarleton Agricultural College as a member of the Texas A&M University system, certifying the Junior College within the Educational System of Texas. In 1949, it was again renamed Tarleton State College then became a four-year degree-granting institution in 1959. Tarleton gained status as a university in 1973 adopting its current name, Tarleton State University. In 2003 it began offering doctoral programs.

== Academics ==
Academic rankings

National
- U.S. News & World Report: 373 (tie)
- Washington Monthly: 243
- WSJ/College Pulse: 371

The university offers 85 undergraduate, 38 masters, 2 associate degree programs, and 2 doctoral programs.

Degrees are offered through eight colleges:

- Agriculture & Natural Resources
- Business
- Education
- Graduate Studies
- Health Sciences
- Liberal & Fine Arts
- Science & Mathematics
- Mayfield College of Engineering

=== Educational programs ===
The Department of Animal Sciences oversees the Tarleton Equine-Assisted Therapy (TREAT) program that is designed to utilize horseback riding as a form of physical, emotional and recreational therapy. Hippotherapy (physical therapy on horseback using the horse as a therapist) has developed as a medical field recognized by most major countries.

The Texas Institute for Applied Environmental Research (TIAER) on the Tarleton campus plays a national leadership role in environmental issues related to water quality. This program provides the university, the dairy and beef industries, environmental control agencies and governmental policy groups with water pollution data for the 230,000-acre (930 km^{2}) Upper North Bosque River watershed.

In fall 2002 the W.K. Gordon Center for Industrial History of Texas opened at a site located near Thurber, a ghost town located approximately 30 miles (48 km) northwest of Stephenville and about one hour west of the DFW Metroplex. Funded through a $1.2 million grant from the Texas Department of Transportation and a private gift from Mrs. W.K. Gordon Jr. The center is located on 4.1 acres (17,000 m^{2}) near the site of Texas' first coal mine and adjacent to New York Hill along Interstate 20. The center is dedicated to the preservation, research and recording of Texas industrial history including coal mining, brick making and oil and gas exploration.

Tarleton operates two radio stations. KXTR-LP 100.7 FM is a student-operated rock station, while KTRL 90.5 FM is a public radio station broadcasting news, classical music, and jazz. Both are operated by students of Tarleton State University out of the radio station located in the Mathematics building on the TSU campus. Tarleton State University is one of three universities in the state of Texas to own and operate two radio stations; the other institutions being the University of Texas at Austin and Texas Tech University.

== Campuses ==
Tarleton students come from 47 U.S. states and 40 countries. Most university activities take place on Tarleton's 180-acre (0.73 km^{2}) main campus. An 800-acre (3.2 km^{2}) operational university farm with classroom space is located near the main campus northwest of Stephenville with access from TX Highway 8 and US Route 281. The 1,170-acre (4.7 km^{2}) Hunewell Ranch is located in Erath County and provides additional educational facilities. Tarleton also offers specialized programs at its Dora Lee Langdon Cultural and Educational Center in Granbury and select programs and courses at McLennan Community College in Waco, Weatherford College in Weatherford, Bryan at the Texas A&M-RELLIS Campus, and in Fort Worth. Upper-level courses were offered at Tarleton-Central Texas in Killeen until 2009 when Texas A&M University–Central Texas was formed as a separate institution.

=== Stephenville ===
Most university activities take place on Tarleton's main campus in Stephenville, the county seat of Erath County.

Tarleton State University campuses

The main campus in Stephenville features a 72,000-square-foot (6,700 m^{2}) sports recreation center opened in fall 2007.

A $13 million, 42,000-square-foot (3,900 m^{2}) dining facility opened in fall 2008. The new building is an extension of the student center and has two floors, a convenience store, executive meeting rooms and a cafe with a wireless network.

In 2001, the university completed a $30.8 million science building complete with a 86-seat planetarium. In 2014, the Science Building was named for Lamar Johnson a former professor of biological sciences and dean of the College of Arts & Sciences. The old science building went through an extensive $13.5 million renovation and expansion upgrading laboratories and classrooms. This building is now named the Mathematics Building. An observatory at Hunewell Ranch houses a fully robotic 32-inch-diameter (810 mm) research-grade telescope.

The Dick Smith Library is a three-floor facility that houses materials including print books, periodicals, curriculum collection, audio-visual material, e-books, streaming media, and special collections.

The university opened the EECU Center in 2025. The center seats up to 8,000 for basketball games or 10,000 people for concerts.

Other notable buildings:

- Administration Building
- Barry B. Thompson Student Center
- Clyde H. Wells Fine Arts Center
- College of Business Administration Building
- E.J. Howell Education Building
- Mayfield Engineering Building
- Joe W. Autry Agricultural Building
- Nursing Building
- O.A. Grant Humanities Building
- Tarleton Center
- Trogdon House
- W.K. Gordon Center for the Industrial History of Texas

=== Fort Worth ===
Tarleton–Fort Worth is a campus located in Tarrant County. The university has maintained a presence in Fort Worth since assuming control of the C.C. Terrell Memorial School of Medical Technology in the 1970s. In 2019, the university opened the first dedicated academic building on an 80–acre campus is located adjacent to the Chisholm Trail Parkway in southwest Tarrant County. The building, referred to as "Building I," is a 76,000-square-foot (7,100 m^{2}), three story multi-use facility with classroom, office space, and a library. The campus is projected to enroll over 9,000 students by 2030.

== Leadership ==
The current and 16th president is James L. Hurley who was appointed by the Texas A&M University System Board of Regents in August 2019. Diane Stearns is the Chief Academic Officer serving as Provost and Executive Vice President for Academic Affairs.

As a member of the Texas A&M University System, Tarleton is one of a network of 11 higher educational institutions administered by a Chancellor and a Board of Regents. Regents are appointed by the Governor. The current Chancellor is Glen Hegar and chair of the Board of Regents is Robert Albritton.

== Student life ==
Undergraduate demographics as of Fall 2023
Race and ethnicity	Total
American Indian/Alaska Native	1%
White	64%
Hispanic	23%
Black	6%
Two or more races	3%
Asian	1%
International student	1%
Unknown	1%
Economic diversity
Low-income (Note: The percentage of students who received an income-based federal Pell grant intended for low-income students.)	38%
Affluent (Note: The percentage of students who are a part of the American middle class at the bare minimum.)	62%

=== Athletics ===
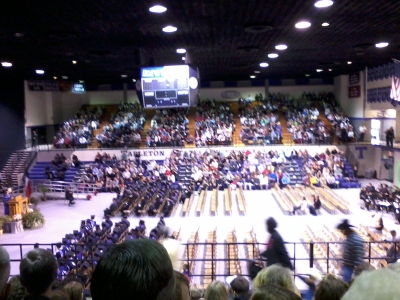
Tarleton students graduate at Wisdom Gym in December 2010

Tarleton State University athletics currently competes at the NCAA Division I level in the Western Athletic Conference (WAC). They were admitted into the WAC on July 1, 2020, therefore ending their 26-year stint at the Division II level with the Lone Star Conference (LSC). Their admission into the LSC in 1995 marked their second period of membership, having previously participated from 1968 to 1975. They were a founding member of the Texas Intercollegiate Athletic Association (TIAA) in 1976 and remained in that league until 1990. From 1991 to 1994 Tarleton played as an Independent.

The teams are known as the "Texans". Athletes were known as the "Plowboys" before the college became a four-year institution in 1961.

When women's sports were introduced in 1968–69, those teams played under the "Texans" nickname, but due to the desire of that day's female athletes to play under a distinctive nickname, the women's nickname was changed the next school year. "Texanns", "Tex-Anns", and "TexAnns" were used interchangeably until 1972–73, when "TexAnns" was officially settled on. Following a campaign initially led by two players and a (female) student manager in the women's basketball program, Tarleton returned the "Texans" nickname to women's teams in 2019–20.

The basketball and volleyball teams play at Wisdom Gym. The football team plays at Memorial Stadium. The baseball team plays at Cecil Ballow Baseball Complex. The softball team plays at the Tarleton Softball Complex.

Tarleton State University fields six men's varsity sports and eight women's varsity sports in the Western Athletic Conference:

Men's	Women's
Baseball	Basketball
Basketball	Cross Country
Cross Country	Golf
Football	Soccer
Track & Field (Note: Tarleton fields teams in indoor and outdoor track for both sexes. The NCAA classifies indoor and outdoor track as separate sports, holding indoor championships in its winter season and outdoor championships in its spring season.)	Softball
	Tennis
	Track & Field
	Volleyball

=== Music ===
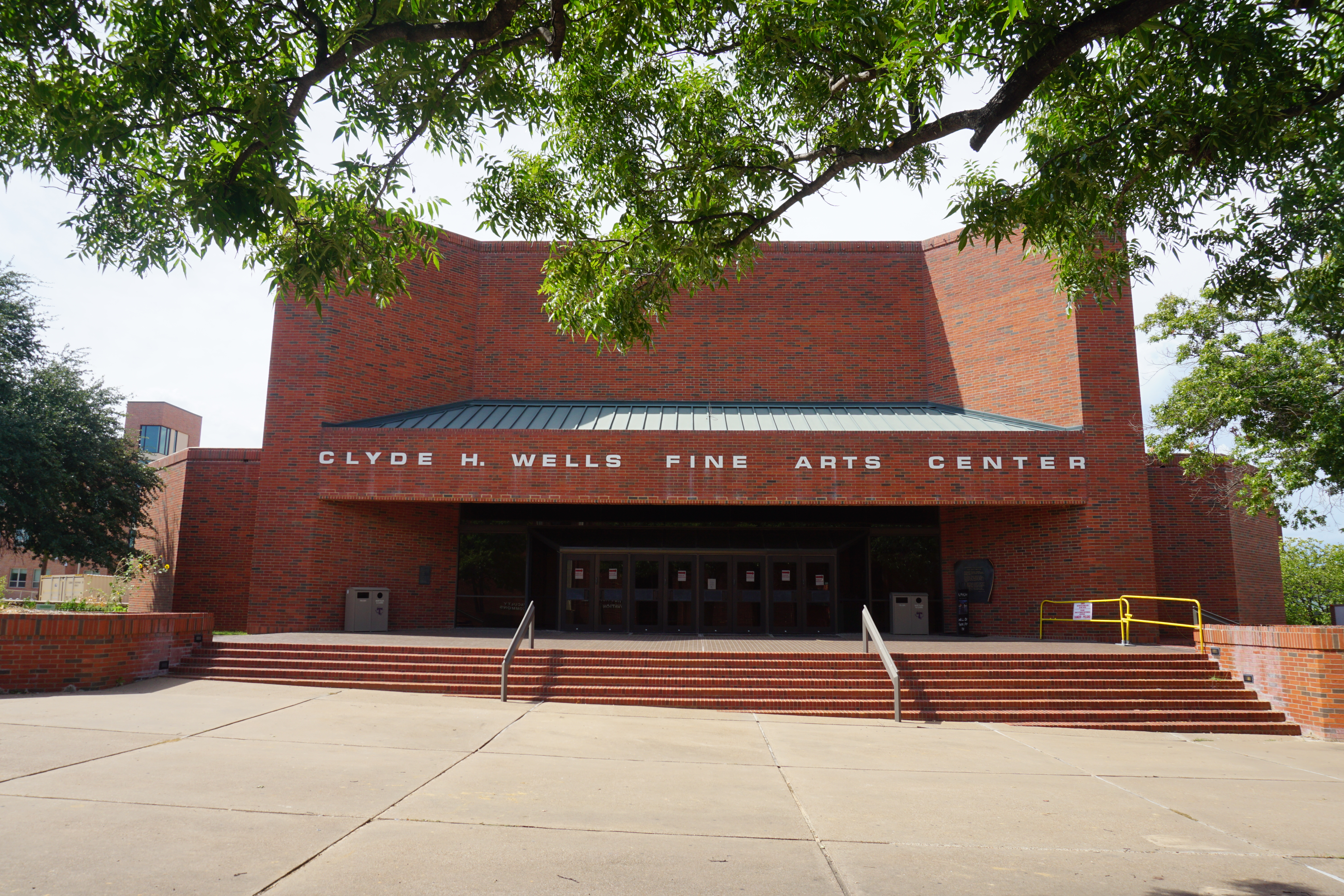
Clyde H. Wells Fine Arts Center

The music program at Tarleton State University is a fully accredited member of the National Association of Schools of Music. It is housed in the Clyde H. Wells Fine Arts Center. This multi-purpose fine arts complex contains three theatres: a 243-seat recital hall, an 805-seat auditorium, and the workshop theatre. There is a 16-keyboard piano lab and computer lab. The instrument collection includes two nine-foot concert Steinway grand pianos, the Waggener Memorial Organ (a tracker two-manual pipe organ), a Richard Kingston harpsichord, and several Steinway grand pianos that are designated for piano majors to practice. The university currently offers three music degrees, which are Bachelor of Arts in music, Bachelor of Music in music education (with all-level certification) and the Bachelor of Music in performance. It currently offers one online graduate degree, Master of Music in music education. The program has over 150 full-time enrolled students with 80% being instrumental studies and 20% being vocal studies. The Tarleton music department hosts many festivals and clinics throughout the school year, including Brass Day, TMEA All-Region Band clinics, Jazz Festival, Invitational Band Festival, TMEA Area Choir clinics, and the Let All Men Sing!

Music ensembles include The Sound and the Fury, The Texan Marching Band, Foul Play Basketball Band, Chamber Winds, Wind Ensemble, Symphonic Band, two jazz bands, Brass Ensemble, Woodwind Chamber Ensemble, Trumpet Ensemble, Horn Choir, and Flute Choir.

=== Texan Corps of Cadets ===
The Texan Corps of Cadets was founded in 1917 when John Tarleton Agriculture College joined the Texas A&M University system. The Corps of Cadets was initially known as "Johns Army". The Corps of Cadets survived through the end of the 1950s. Until 2016, the school had only an Army ROTC program. In 2016 the Texan Corps of Cadets was brought back to the university.

The Texan Corps of Cadets offers students an opportunity to obtain a minor in Leadership Studies. All cadets live together in a residence hall at Tarleton called Traditions. All cadets wear their uniforms to class every day and must abide by the regulations set forth in the "Chisel".

== Notable people ==
=== Alumni ===
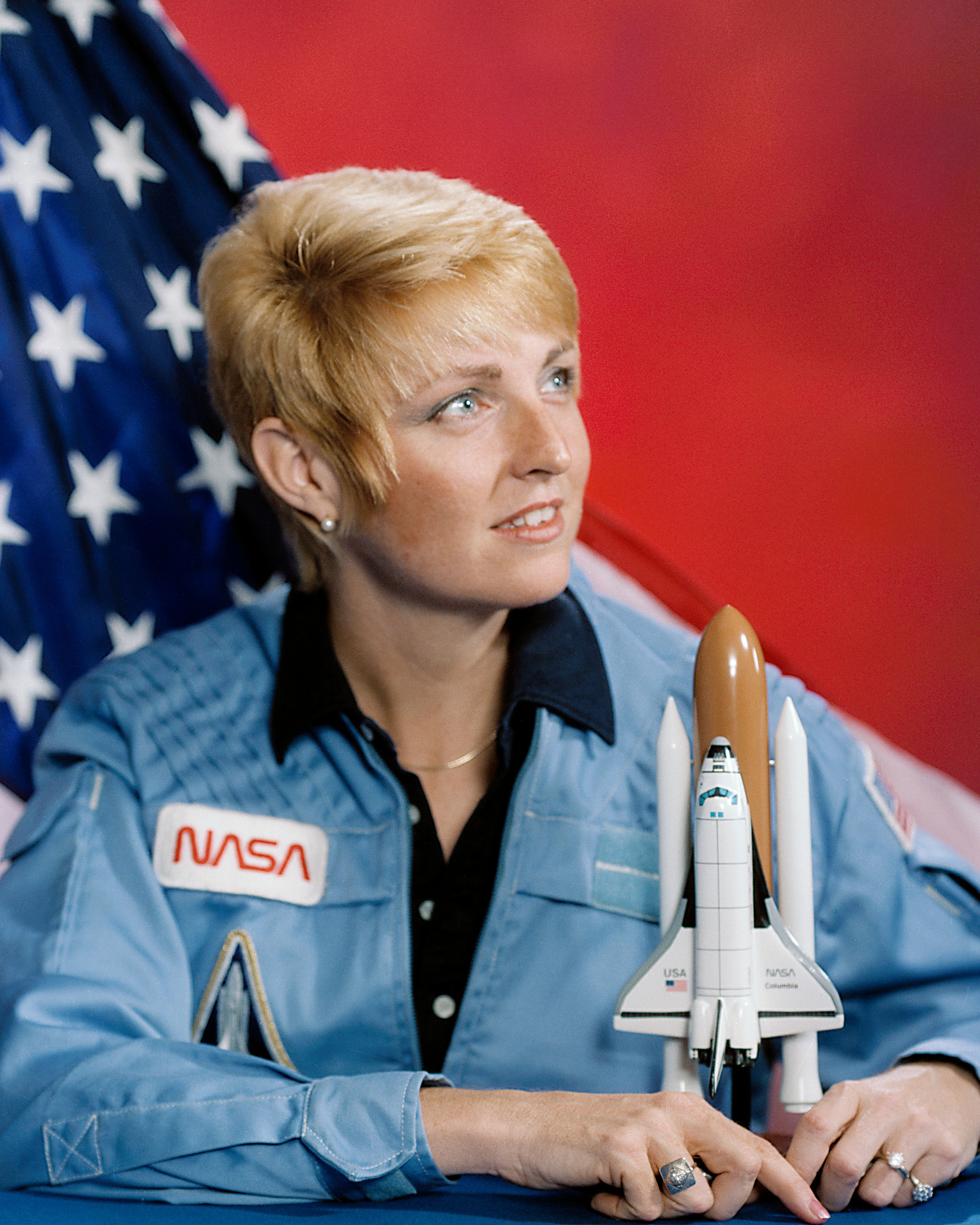
Millie Hughes-Fulford

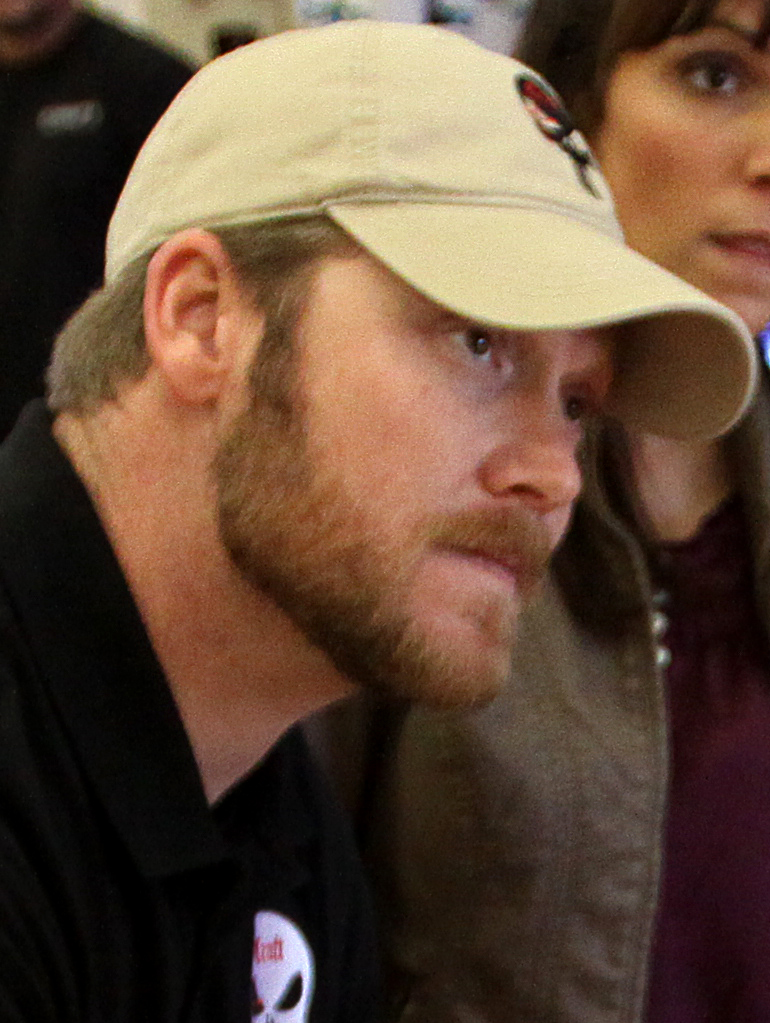
Chris Kyle

- Chris Adams, retired US Air Force Major General
- Ryan Bingham, singer/songwriter, Grammy Award and 2010 Academy Award winner
- Ben Barnes, former Lieutenant Governor of Texas (1969–1973) and Speaker of the Texas House of Representatives (1965–1969)
- Richard Bartel, National Football League (NFL) quarterback
- Philip Montgomery, former head football coach at the University of Tulsa
- DeWayne Burns (class of 1994), Republican member of Texas House of Representatives from Johnson and Bosque counties from 2015 to 2025
- Darius Cooper, receiver for the Philadelphia Eagles
- James Dearth, NFL tight end
- William E. Dyess, survivor of Bataan Death March during World War II
- Chad Fox, Major League Baseball (MLB) player
- J. W. Fritz, head of the police investigation of the murder of president John F. Kennedy
- Steve Fryar, professional steer wrestler
- Bob Glasgow, Democratic Texas State Senator
- Rick Hardcastle, Republican former member of Texas House of Representatives from Wilbarger County
- Josh Hawley (born 1996), Israeli Basketball Premier League player
- Millie Hughes-Fulford (1945–2021), chemist and astronaut
- Jim Johnson, college athletics director
- Rufus Johnson, NFL linebacker selected in sixth round (pick 183) of 2013 NFL draft
- George Kennedy, actor
- Chris Kyle (1974–2013), U.S. Navy SEAL
- Mary Madison, Iowa politician
- Stacey McGill, program director, Trace Systems
- Sid Miller, Texas Agriculture Commissioner and former member of Texas House of Representatives
- Mike Moncrief, member of Texas House of Representatives, judge, former mayor of Fort Worth
- Hal Mumme, college football coach
- Conner Prince, 2024 Summer Olympic silver medalist in skeet shooting
- Derrick Ross, former NFL football player
- James Earl Rudder, U.S. Army Major General and World War II veteran, former Chancellor of the Texas A&M University System
- Sam M. Russell, U.S. Representative serving 1941–1947
- Norman Shumway, father of heart transplantation
- E. J. Speed, NFL linebacker
- Charles Steen, geologist who made first big strike of 1950s uranium boom
- Charles W. Stenholm, U.S. Representative from 1979 to 2005
- Clyde H. Wells, Texas A&M University System Regent 1961–1985 and rancher
- Koe Wetzel, Texas country music singer/songwriter
- Randy Winkler, NFL offensive tackle
- Marvin Zindler, investigative reporter for KTRK-TV

=== Faculty ===
- Barry B. Thompson, former Chancellor of the Texas A&M University System
