= Nancy B. Moody =

Nancy B. Moody (died December 26, 2024) was the president of Tusculum College in Greeneville, Tennessee from until October 2009 through September 2017. Previously, from 2002 to 2009, Moody served as the president at Lincoln Memorial University.

== Family life and education ==
Moody earned her Associate and Bachelor’s degrees in Nursing from Eastern Kentucky University, her M.S. in Nursing from Texas Woman’s University and a D.S.N. from the University of Alabama School of Nursing in Birmingham.

She was married to Tom Moody.

== Academic career ==
=== Lincoln Memorial University ===
Moody began her academic career as a nursing professor at Lincoln Memorial University in 1974. At Lincoln Memorial University, Moody advanced to reach to reach the position of Dean of the School of Professional Studies.

From 2002 to 2009, she served as the president at Lincoln Memorial University.

=== Eastern Tennessee State University ===
Moody moved to East Tennessee State University where she earned tenure and later chaired the Department of Professional Roles/Mental Health Nursing. While at East Tennessee State, Moody researched the differences and similarities of the care provided by physicians and mid-level practitioners such nurse practitioners and physician assistants.

=== University of Tennessee ===
Moody left East Tennessee State University for the University of Tennessee, in Knoxville to be an associate professor.

=== Tennessee Center for Nursing ===
In 1995, Mood with Patricia Smith applied for and received funding from Robert Wood Johnson Colleagues in Caring program to support regional and state collaboration to address shortages in the nursing labor workforce. In 2000, after the Robert Wood Johnson funding ended, Blue Cross and Blue Shield of Tennessee provided funding for an executive director and an administrative assistant. Moody was named the executive director and the not-for- profit organization was renamed the Tennessee Center for Nursing and moved to the University of Tennessee.

=== Tusculum College ===
In October 2009, Moody became the Twenty-seventh president and the first woman president of Tusculum College. She left the position in September 2017.

== Organizations ==
Moody was a member of the Board of Trustees of the Southern Association of Colleges and Schools Commission on Colleges, chair of the NCAA Division II South Atlantic Conference, and an advisory board member for the Northeast Tennessee College and Career Readiness Consortium.

Moody served on the NCAA Division II President’s Council, was the chair of the Tennessee Independent Colleges and Universities Association, and a member of the Board of the Appalachian College Association.

== Awards and recognition ==
Moody was awarded the Alma E. Gault Leadership Award from the Tennessee Nurses Association and the Texas Woman’s University Chancellor’s Alumni Excellence Award.
