= John Tarleton (American settler) =

John Tarleton, American settler and rancher

- Only known photograph (a tintype) of John Tarleton (Note: According to two newspaper articles from 1928 and 1949, this is the only photograph ever made of John Tarleton. It was taken in Galveston Texas, after he had been drugged and robbed by bandits. The sad look in his portrait, which was painted from the tintype by a New York artist in 1905, probably results from the fact he lost $800 to the bandits.)
- Born: White Mountain, Vermont, US
- Died: Texas, US
- Known for: John Tarleton Agricultural College

John Tarleton (1808 or 1811 – 1895) was an American settler and rancher. He is best known for endowing John Tarleton Agricultural College, which eventually became Tarleton State University.

== Biography ==
He was born in either White Mountain, Vermont, or in New Hampshire, in November 1808, or 1811. He was orphaned when he was seven, and went to live with his widowed aunt in Vermont. His brother was sent to another relative in Virginia.

When he was 14, he decided to run away and tried to enlist in the Army. He had told a friend of his plan, who then betrayed his secret by telling his aunt. She "nipped the plan in the bud at the recruiting station". He was successful in his next attempt at running away and caught a boat to North Carolina, where he worked as a farm hand, and cut wood for 50 cents a cord. He then made his way to Knoxville, Tennessee, where he attended school, earning a teacher's certificate. He taught school for a short time, earning $30 a month. After leaving the school, he took a job at Cowan and Dickerson mercantile as a clerk, where he worked for 40 years, before finally becoming owner of the business. It was during this period, he bought up bounty certificates issued to veterans of the War of 1812, which authorized them "to settle on any unsurveyed or unappropriated public land." He also purchased 10,000 acres (4,000 ha) of land in Erath and Palo Pinto counties in Texas at 12.5 cents an acre.

In 1860 or 1861, he set out to look over his property. He found Native Americans living on the land, so he set up a mercantile store in Waco, where he spent his time until he was 70, when he moved to his property in 1881.

In September 1876, he married wealthy widow Mary Louisa Johnson. They agreed to a contract keeping their estates separate, but when the wife learned that her husband owned a considerable amount of land, she asked for a different division of their property. He refused, and a year and a day after their wedding, she filed for divorce in a St. Louis court. John Tarleton got to the hearings just in time to present his copy of their marriage contract, and the divorce was granted with no division of property. The couple did, however, remain friends.

In 1880, he revisited his land in Erath and Palo Pinto counties. The Native Americans had been supplanted by settlers, whom he paid for the improvements they had made. He had his land surveyed and tried to sell plots, with no success, so he became a rancher, with middling success.

Various sources have given different dates for his death, but they all agree Tarleton died of typhoid fever. The dates given for his death are September 11, November 16, and November 26, 1895. He was initially buried at Pattillo, and was later moved to the college campus where he remained until April 1928, when he was again moved to a triangular park at the southwest edge of the campus.

== Legacy ==
External image
- Statue of Tarleton and his pet duck, Oscar P. on the campus of Tarleton State University

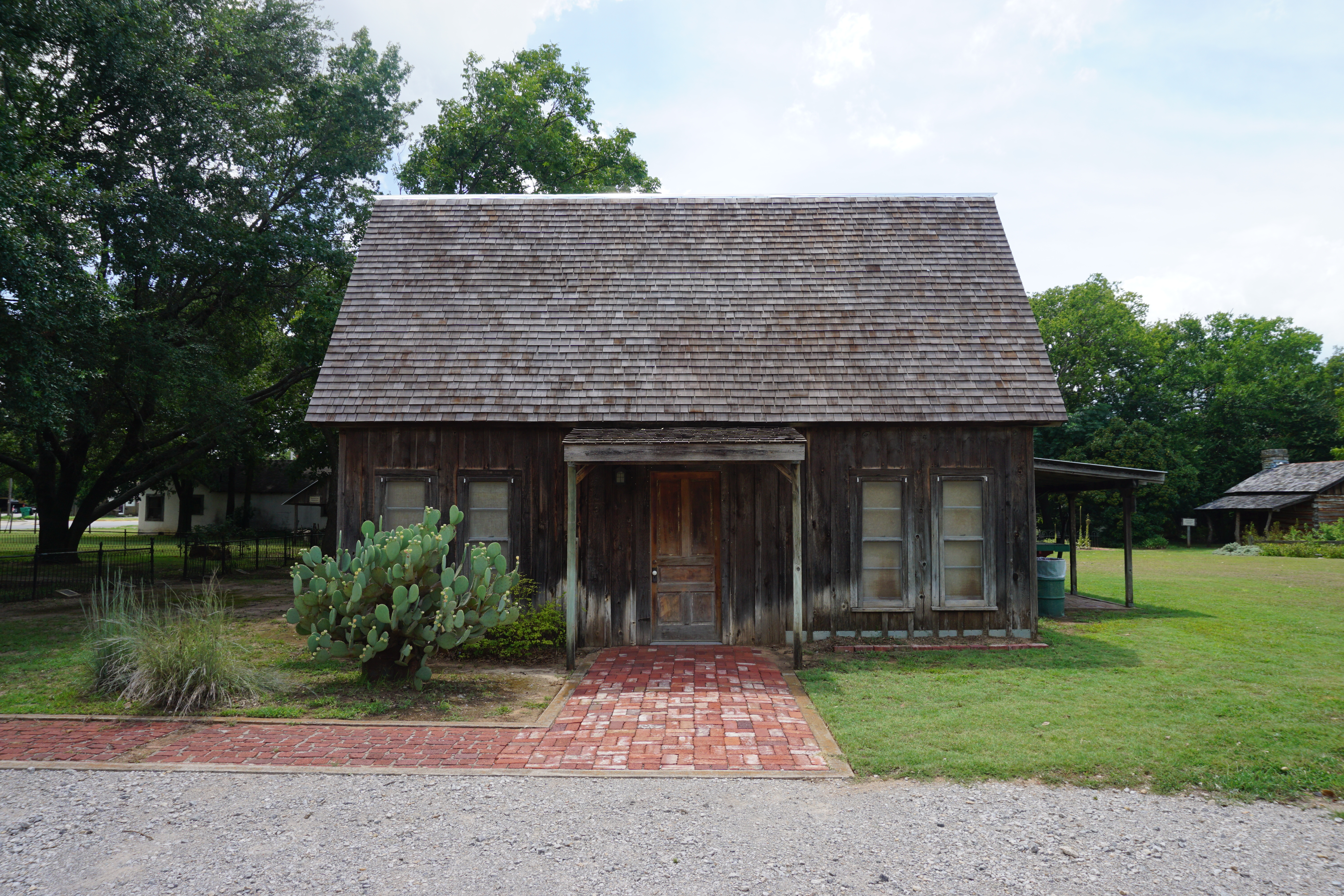
The John Tarleton Ranch House at the Stephenville Historical House Museum in Stephenville, Texas

In his will, Tarleton left about $85,000, a considerable amount at the time, to establish a college in Stephenville, Texas, which eventually became Tarleton State University. He also directed that his land in Knoxville be used to set up the John Tarleton Institute "for poor, worthy youths of good moral character."

A monument and historical marker to Tarleton stands across from the Stephenville campus at the intersection of Lillian and Washington streets. A statue honoring Tarleton was erected on the campus in 2015. The original John Tarleton Ranch House is displayed at the Stephenville Historical House Museum.
