= Diana da Costa Neves =

Australian-Portuguese basketball player

Personal information
- Born: 26 February 1987 (age 39) Johannesburg, South Africa
- Listed height: 5 ft 7 in (1.70 m)

Career information
- High school: St Peters Lutheran College (Brisbane, Australia)
- College: Vanguard (2008–2010)
- WNBA draft: 2010: undrafted
- Playing career: 2005–present
- Position: Guard

Career history
- 2005: Gladstone Port City Power
- 2008: Rockhampton Cyclones
- 2009–2013: Gladstone Port City Power
- 2010–2011: Logan Thunder
- 2011: Boa Viagem
- 2011–2012: CAB Madeira
- 2015: Sunshine Coast Clippers

Career highlights
- 3x QBL Champion (2009, 2010, 2011)

Diana da Costa Neves (born 1987) is an Australian-Portuguese professional basketball player.

== College career ==
In 2005, Neves began her college career at Tusculum College in Tusculum, Tennessee for the Pioneers. Strong showings earned her a transfer to Vanguard University in Costa Mesa, California to play for the Lions.

== Professional career ==
=== Australia ===
Neves returned to Australia after college and returned to Gladstone in the Queensland Basketball League. Soon after, Neves made her WNBL debut with the Logan Thunder for the 2010–11 WNBL season. In the QBL, after spending four seasons at Gladstone, Neves joined the Sunshine Coast Clippers for the 2015 season.

=== Portugal ===
Neves made her European debut, with Boa Viagem in the Liga Feminina de Basquetebol in Portugal for the 2011–12 season. She would soon after switch to CAB Madeira for the remainder of the season.

== National team career ==
Born in South Africa, Neves then moved to Queensland, Australia at a young age. Neves has dual Australian and Portuguese citizenship due to her parents ancestry. She made her debut for the Portuguese National team at the EuroBasket Women 2011 Division B.
