= Dermatome (instrument) =

Surgical instrument

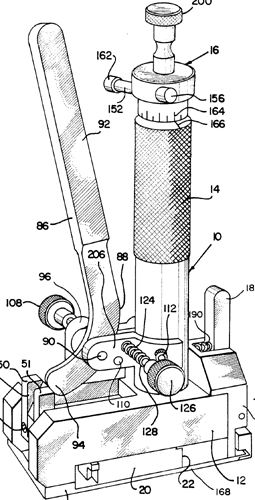
Diagram of a dermatome

A dermatome is a surgical instrument for producing thin slices of skin from a donor area, for use in skin grafts. One of its main applications is for reconstituting skin areas damaged by third degree burns or trauma.

Dermatomes can be operated either manually or electrically. The first drum dermatomes, developed in the 1930s, were manually operated. Afterwards, dermatomes which were operated by air pressure, such as the Brown dermatome, achieved higher speed and precision. Electrical dermatomes are better for cutting out thinner and longer strips of skin with a more homogeneous thickness.

== Free-hand knives ==
Those are manual dermatomes and the term knife or scalpel is used to describe them. Their disadvantages are harvesting of grafts with irregular edges and grafts of variable thickness. Their operator has to be experienced in their use for optimal results.

== Types ==
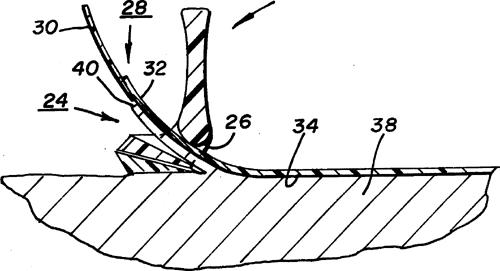
Side view of a drum dermatome blade (24) removing a slice of skin (38 and 40).

There are several types of dermatomes, usually named after their inventor.

=== Knives ===
- Blair/Brown knife
- Humby knife: similar to the Blair knife with the addition of an adjustable roller which controls the thickness of the graft taken.
- Braithwaite knife
- Watson knife, a modified version of the Braithwaite knife
- Cobbett knife, a modified version of the Braithwaite knife
- Goulian/Weck knife
- Silver knife, for the harvesting of small grafts

=== Drums ===
- Padgett dermatome: It was the first rotary drum manual dermatome.
- Reese dermatome

=== Electric dermatomes ===
- Brown dermatome, the first with powered rotation to be developed, used mostly for large skin grafts. It is electrically operated.
- Castroviejo dermatome, also electrically operated, is a precision dermatome with a small head and controllable thickness, which is most used for mucous membrane grafts.
- Electrical dermatomes are better for cutting out thinner and longer strips of skin with a more homogeneous thickness.

=== Air dermatomes ===
- The air dermatome is the presently most commonly used dermatome worldwide, used mostly for large skin grafts.

== See also ==
- Instruments used in general surgery
