= Clyde H. Wells =

- Born: Clyde Henley Wells; June 22, 1916
- Died: January 26, 1987 (aged 70)
- Education: Texas A&M University System regents Tarleton State University; Texas A&M University
- Occupation: Rancher

Clyde Henley Wells (June 22, 1916 – January 26, 1987) was a rancher and long-time regent of the Texas A&M University System. He served as Chairman of the Board of Regents for 12 years.

== Early life ==
Wells was born in 1916 in Stephenville, Texas. He was the oldest of two children born to Monroe and Delula Belle (Henley) Wells. His father was the foreman of the Tarleton College farm, now known as the Tarleton Agricultural Center. Tarleton State University is a member of the Texas A&M University System dating to 1917.

Wells and his sister, Elizabeth Marie Wells (Johnson) grew up on the college farm. Both graduated from Stephenville High School and attended John Tarleton Agricultural College, later re-named Tarleton State University. The farm remains both a working agricultural enterprise and educational facility. Wells went on to also graduate from Texas A&M University in College Station in 1938. Wells married Marie White of Weatherford in 1940.

== Career ==
Wells became the general manager of Black Ranch Texas beginning in the 1950s. The ranch originally encompassed 25,000 acres and was the largest in Hood County. He was director for the Texas and Southwestern Cattle Raisers Association, the Southwestern Exposition and Fat Stock Show, and the Texas A&M Research Foundation.

Wells was appointed to the governing body of the Texas A&M University System in 1961 by Governor Price Daniel. He served until 1985 and is the longest serving regent to date being re-appointed by four subsequent governors. Wells was chairman of the board for 12 years. Wells served as chairman of the Council of Governing Boards of Texas Colleges and Universities.

== Honors ==
Dedicated in 1980, The Clyde H. Wells Fine Arts Center on the Tarleton State University main campus in Stephenville is named for Wells. Wells Hall on the campus of Texas A&M University-College Station is also named in honor of the alumnus.

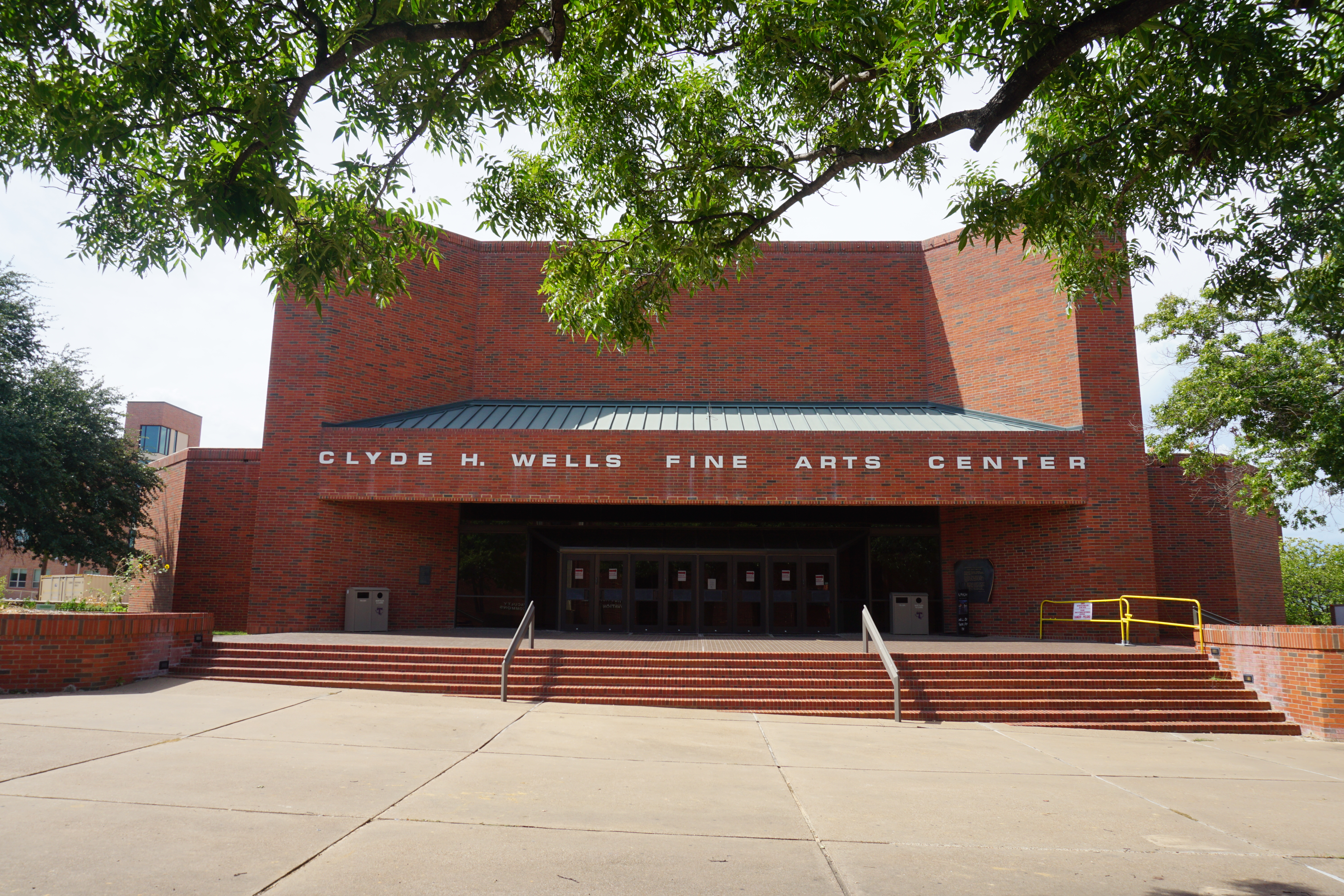
Clyde H. Wells Fine Arts Center

Wells was named “Man of the Year in Texas Agriculture” in 1967 by the Texas County Agricultural Agents Association. The Clyde H. Wells Golf Tournament is held annually by the Tarleton State University Alumni Association. Wells and his father are both mentioned in the Tarleton "Purple Book" for their contributions to the university.

== Personal life and death ==
Wells and his wife, Marie White Wells (1913–2008), are interred in Stephenville West End Cemetery near the Tarleton State University campus. Their daughter, Lana Wells Collier (1942–2017) and husband Benjamin Raye Collier (1929–2019) formerly of Dallas; parents Monroe and Delula Belle (Henley) Wells; sister Marie Elizabeth (1921-2017) and husband William "Bill" Franklin Johnson (1922-2000) are also interred nearby. The family's papers are housed in the Dick Smith Library at Tarleton State University.
