= Newyorkitis =

Book published in 1901

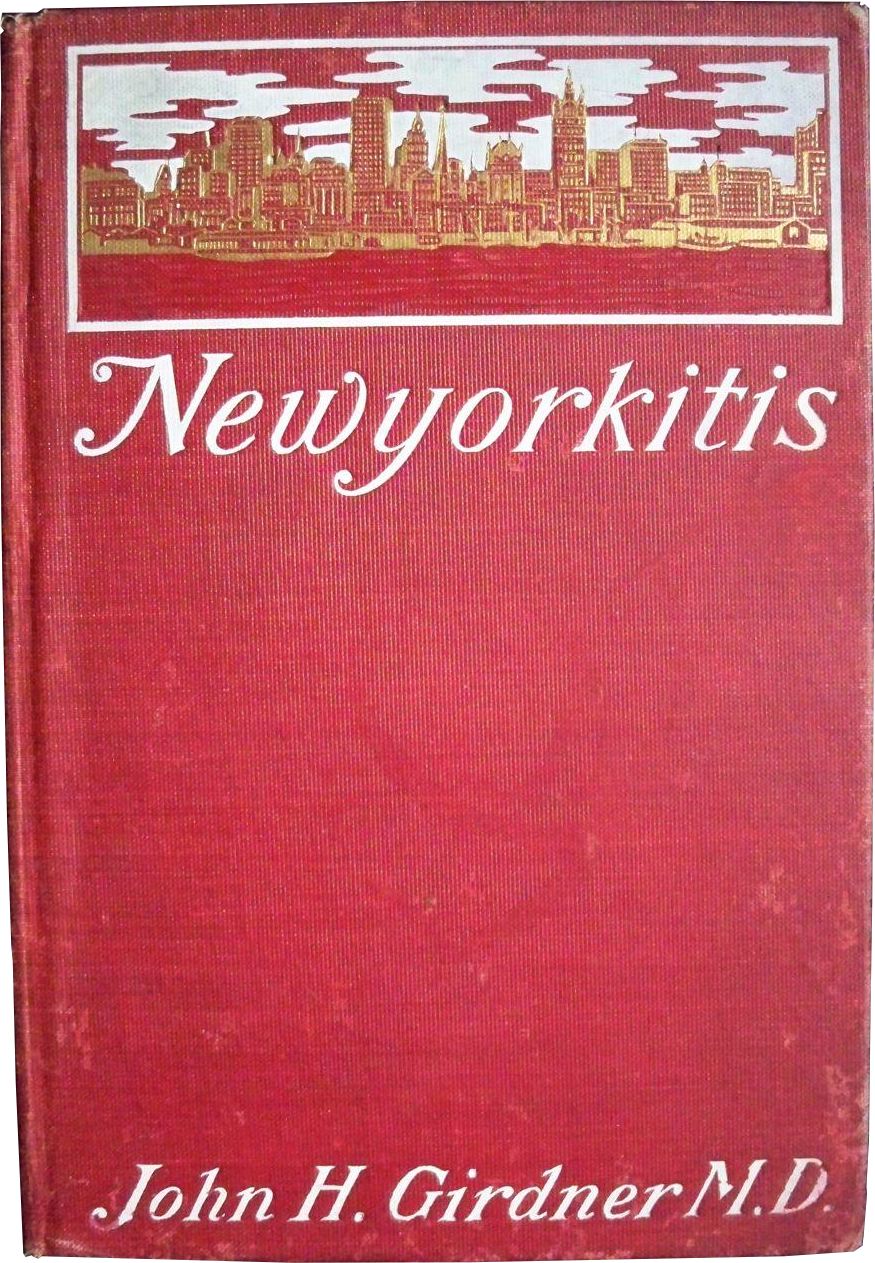
- first US edition
- Author: John Harvey Girdner
- Language: English
- Publisher: Grafton Press
- Publication date: 1901

Newyorkitis is a 1901 book by surgeon John H. Girdner describing "a condition of mind, body, and soul" that he had observed among patients living in the New York City borough of Manhattan.

== John Harvey Girdner (author) ==
John H. Girdner (March 8, 1856 – October 27, 1933) was a prominent New York surgeon and an associate of the noted surgeon Frank Hamilton. Both Girdner and Hamilton treated President James Garfield after Garfield was shot in 1881. Girdner was the inventor of a "telephonic bullet probe" that came into use before the first x-rays, and was a pioneer in skin grafting. He taught at medical schools and was the author of numerous satirical and philosophical articles for magazines.

== The "affliction" ==
Girdner ascribed a variety of physical symptoms to living in Manhattan, including nearsightedness caused by the presence of buildings in all directions, ears irritated by constant noise, and a "rapidity and nervousness and lack of deliberation in all muscular movements." "Newyorkitis" symptoms also included "haste, rudeness, restlessness, arrogance, contemptuousness, excitability, anxiety, pursuit of novelty and of grandeur, pretensions of omniscience, and therefore prescience, which of course undermines any pleasure taken in novelty."

Newyorkitis was described as "satirical" in obituaries at the time of Girdner's death, and in reviews at the time of publication. The Brooklyn Eagle's review said that "most people have declared that a vein of sarcasm, or satire, runs through the book", and another review described it as an "amusing satire." The Kansas City Press observed in 1901: "We suppose that the author intends his book as a serious criticism of New York conditions, however it is impossible that any one with a sense of humor should be able to read the book without an appreciation of its satire, whether intentional or not." The New York Times reported in 2001 that a family history described Newyorkitis as ''a tongue-in-cheek book ... satirizing the provincialism of life in New York City."

A 2020 Lapham's Quarterly article, however, observed that the press "saw evidence of Girdner’s syndrome everywhere." A New York Tribune article on "Newyorkitis" reported in 1905 that “there were three thousand cases of men falling dead or dying suddenly, an increase of five hundred over any previous year.” In 1908, the Tribune reported that treatment for the condition was being offered at a New York YMCA. It was described as "straight psychology applied directly to the abnormal conditions of urban business and social life."

Earlier, in 1881, New York neurologist George M. Beard wrote that civilization, when combined with "steam power, the periodical press, the telegraph, the sciences and the mental activity of women", brought nervousness and nervous disease to urban dwellers.
