= 2014 Texas Bowl =

2014 AdvoCare V100 Texas Bowl
- 9th Texas Bowl
Arkansas Razorbacks	Texas Longhorns
(6–6)	(6–6)
SEC	Big 12
31	7
Head coach: Bret Bielema	Head coach: Charlie Strong
	1	2	3	4	Total
Arkansas	3	21	0	7	31
Texas	0	7	0	0	7
- Date: December 29, 2014
- Season: 2014
- Stadium: NRG Stadium
- Location: Houston, Texas
- MVP: Arkansas QB Brandon Allen
- Favorite: Arkansas by 6
- National anthem: Cory Morrow
- Referee: Ron Cherry (ACC)
- Attendance: 71,115

United States TV coverage
- Network: ESPN
- Announcers: Dave Pasch, Brian Griese, and Tom Luginbill

The 2014 Texas Bowl was an American college football bowl game played on December 29, 2014, at NRG Stadium in Houston, Texas. It was one of the 2014–15 bowl games that concluded the 2014 FBS football season. The ninth edition of the Texas Bowl, it featured the Arkansas Razorbacks of the Southeastern Conference and the Texas Longhorns of the Big 12 Conference. The game began at 8:00 p.m. CST (UTC−06:00) and aired on ESPN. Sponsored by dietary supplement company AdvoCare, it was officially known as the AdvoCare V100 Texas Bowl. Arkansas defeated Texas, 31–7.

Both Arkansas and Texas, led by relatively new head coaches Bret Bielema and Charlie Strong, entered with identical 6–6 records. Arkansas made their 40th overall bowl game appearance while Texas made their 53rd, though both teams made their first appearance in the Texas Bowl. The Razorbacks were favored to win the game by six points, with their rushing duo of Jonathan Williams and Alex Collins seen as a strong point and a contrast to Texas' passing game, which was seen as a weak point for the Longhorns due to the injury of quarterback David Ash earlier in the season.

After a slow first quarter that saw only an Adam McFain field goal, Arkansas' offense found their stride in the second quarter. The Razorbacks scored three times and built a 24–7 lead by halftime behind a pair of passing touchdowns from quarterback Brandon Allen, while a rushing touchdown by Texas quarterback Tyrone Swoopes late in the half proved to be the Longhorns' only points of the contest. The third and fourth quarters passed with little scoring. An additional rushing touchdown early in the fourth quarter extended the Razorbacks' lead, and the game concluded with Arkansas having claimed their first victory against Texas since 2003.

== Teams ==
The game was the 78th meeting of the Arkansas–Texas football rivalry, which had been played only occasionally since the Razorbacks left the Southwest Conference for the SEC in 1992. Texas entered the game leading the series 56–21. The teams' last meeting came on September 27, 2008, when No. 7 Texas defeated Arkansas, 52–10, in what the Associated Press called an "embarrassing" loss for the Razorbacks, and the largest margin of victory in the series since 1916. This game was the 40th all-time bowl appearance for Arkansas and the 53rd all-time appearance for Texas, though it was the first Texas Bowl appearance for both schools. Additionally, it was the second postseason meeting between the teams, after No. 24 Arkansas upset No. 14 Texas by three touchdowns in the 2000 Cotton Bowl Classic.

=== Arkansas Razorbacks ===
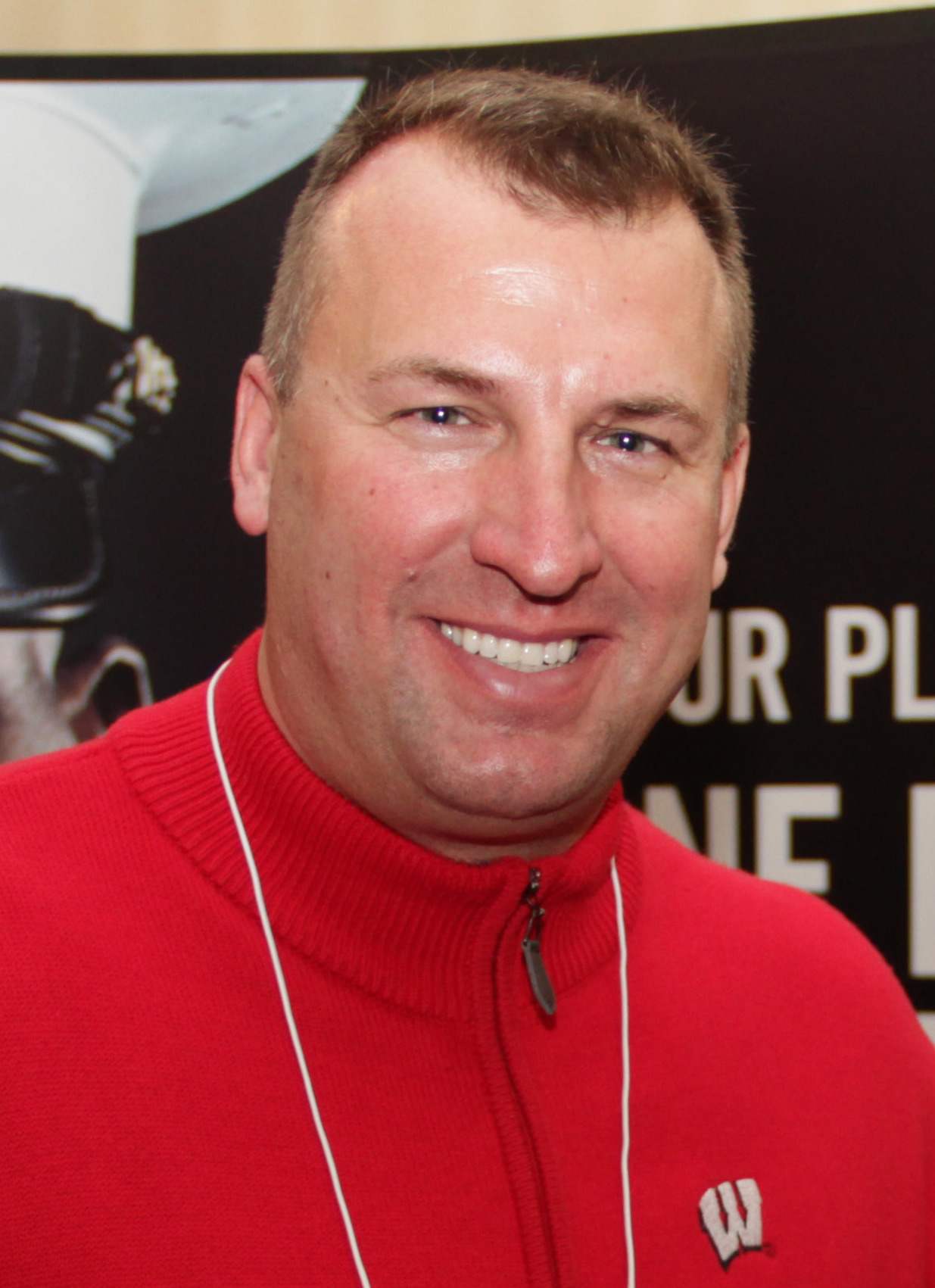
Arkansas head coach Bret Bielema, pictured in 2011.

Led by second-year head coach Bret Bielema, Arkansas entered 2014 looking to improve from a 3–9 campaign the previous year that included a winless record in SEC play. The Razorbacks began their season with a road contest at No. 6 Auburn, where they were tied at halftime but did not score in the second half, and ended up losing by 24 points. The Razorbacks were able to respond with three consecutive non-conference wins; they defeated Nicholls State by a wide margin of 67, Texas Tech by 21 points, and Northern Illinois by 38; the first of these wins broke a school-record ten game losing streak dating back to September 21, 2013. Two close losses followed, as the Hogs fell to No. 6 Texas A&M by a touchdown in overtime the following week, and, following a bye week, were defeated by one point at home by No. 7 Alabama. A third straight matchup against a ranked opponent followed, as the Razorbacks fell to No. 10 Georgia in Little Rock. Now 3–4, the Razorbacks returned to .500 with a defeat of UAB on homecoming; this would be UAB's last season before the shutdown of their football program, which did not resume until the 2017 season. The following weekend, Arkansas took No. 1 Mississippi State down to the wire, but an interception on the would-be game-tying drive doomed the Hogs to a seven-point loss. Following another bye week, Arkansas defeated No. 15 LSU and No. 8 Ole Miss at home in back-to-back weeks; both victories were shutouts, giving Arkansas their first consecutive shutouts of SEC opponents since joining the league in 1992, and making them the first team to shut out multiple ranked teams in the same season since North Carolina Pre-Flight did so in 1942. Arkansas finished the regular season with a matchup against No. 17 Missouri in their first contest as conference foes and, as a result, the first edition of the Battle Line Rivalry; Arkansas led going into the fourth quarter but allowed two touchdowns and lost by seven points.

Arkansas finished the regular season with a 6–6 overall record and a 2–6 mark in conference play. They accepted their bid to the Texas Bowl on December 7, 2014.

=== Texas Longhorns ===
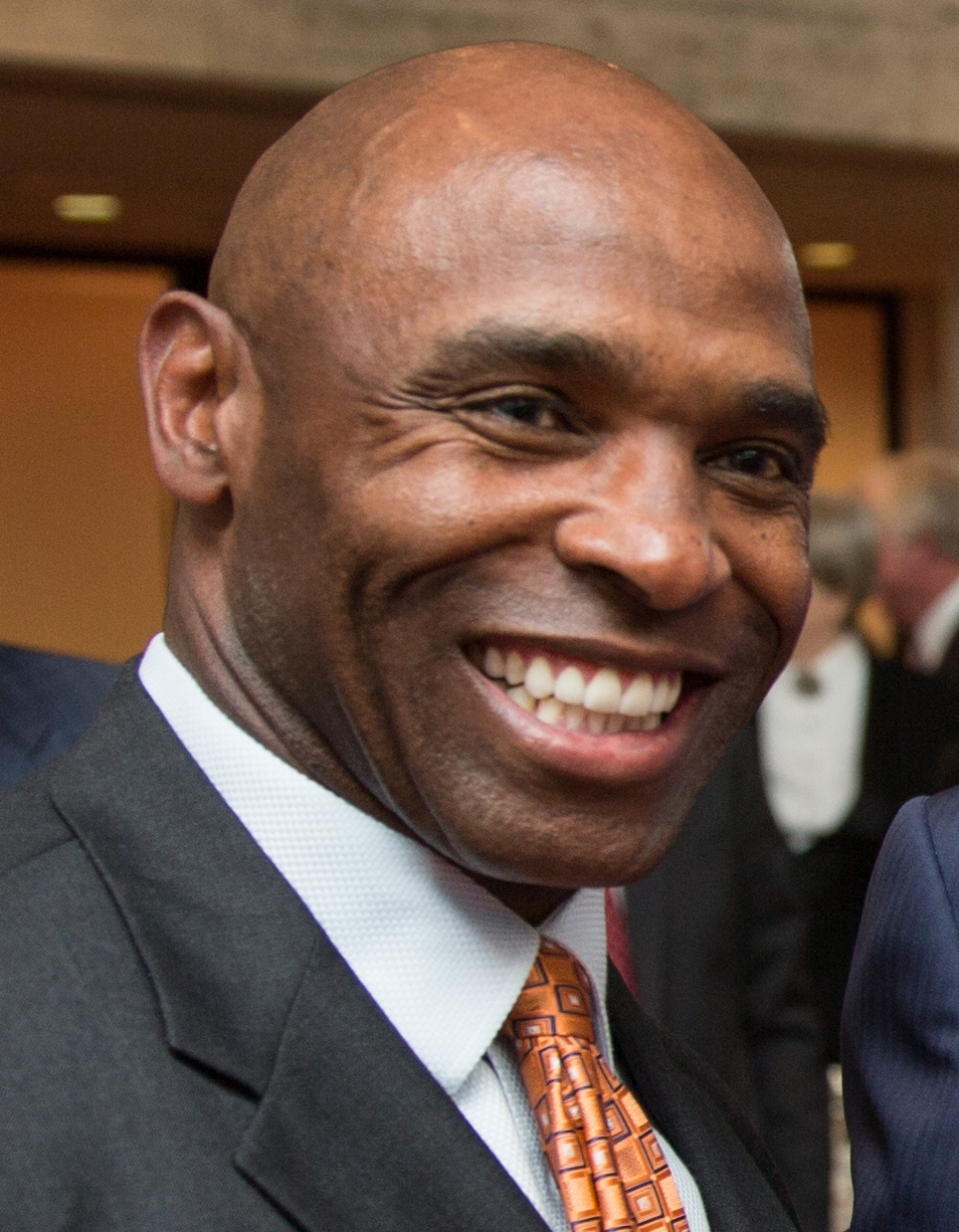
Texas head coach Charlie Strong in 2014.

Following the retirement of head coach Mack Brown at the conclusion of the Longhorns' 8–5 campaign the year prior, they entered the 2014 season led by Charlie Strong, whom they had hired from Louisville during the offseason. This hire made Strong the first black head coach of a men's sport in Texas school history. The Longhorns began the Strong era with a victory, playing North Texas to a 31-point win. They suffered their first setback the following week as they were defeated soundly by BYU in what SB Nation called "a drubbing". Their first game away from home was next on the schedule, as they faced No. 12 UCLA at AT&T Stadium in Arlington; the Longhorns fell by three points after giving up what was the game-winning touchdown with three minutes remaining in the game. Following a bye week, Texas evened their record with a shutout of Kansas in their first true road game. Entering October, Texas faced top-15 ranked teams in two consecutive games, both of which they would lose: they hosted No. 7 Baylor, losing by three touchdowns, and travelled to Dallas to face No. 11 Oklahoma, losing by five points. Texas returned home the following week and rebounded with a three-point win against Iowa State thanks to a Nick Rose game-winning field goal with three seconds remaining, but suffered a shutout loss at No. 11 Kansas State in their next contest. Going into November, the Longhorns had a record of 3–5, but they reversed their fortunes by winning three consecutive games. They defeated Texas Tech convincingly before returning to Austin, where they defeated No. 24 West Virginia. They achieved bowl eligibility with their next win, a road victory against Oklahoma State. After another bye week, they fell to No. 5 TCU, which was their regular season finale and the Longhorns' homecoming game.

Texas finished their regular season with a record of 6–6 and a 5–4 mark in conference. They accepted their bowl bid on December 7, 2014.

== "Horns down" controversy ==
On December 27, two days before the game was played, a press conference for the game was held, with both coaches in attendance. At the conclusion of the conference, the coaches shook hands while posing for the media. In the picture, Arkansas coach Bret Bielema could be seen giving what appeared to be the "horns down" sign, the inverted form of the Hook 'em horns sign, which is often used to show opposition to Texas Longhorns athletic teams. Bielema later denied that he gave the sign on purpose, with some reporting that the image could have been digitally altered using Adobe Photoshop or a similar program; however, this theory was debunked by a live news broadcast of the handshake and separately by the individual that took the photo. SB Nation later reported that the gesture was probably given by accident, as Bielema was seen during the game making the sign inadvertently while moving his middle and ring fingers back and forth. Arkansas quarterback Brandon Allen was later seen deliberately displaying the sign near the end of the game's fourth quarter.

== Game summary ==
=== Pre-game ===
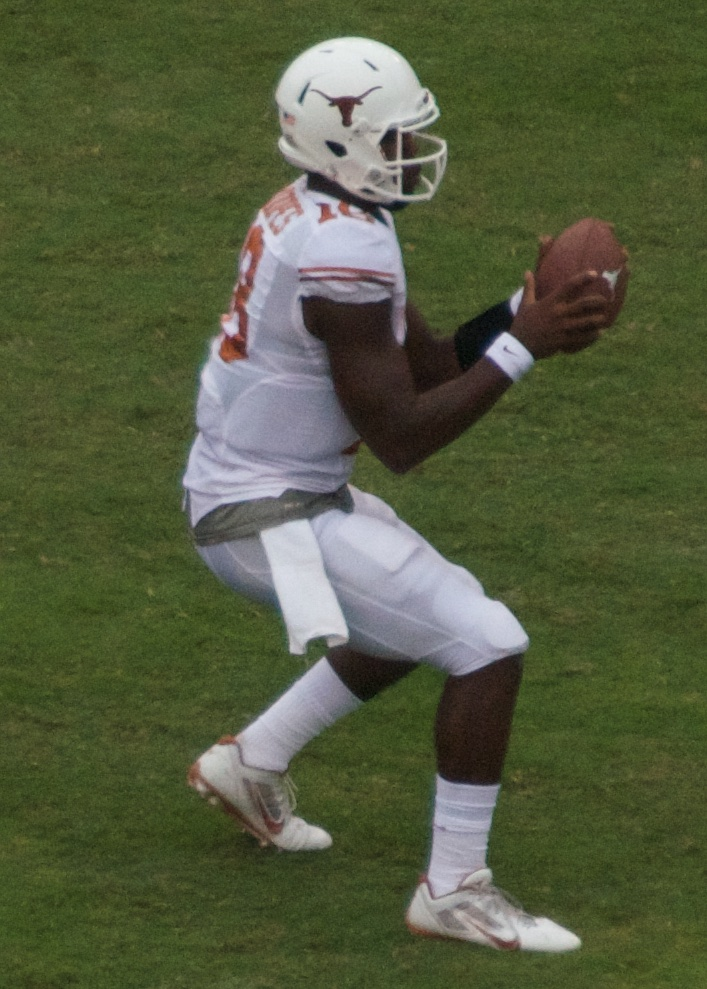
Texas quarterback Tyrone Swoopes, pictured in 2014.

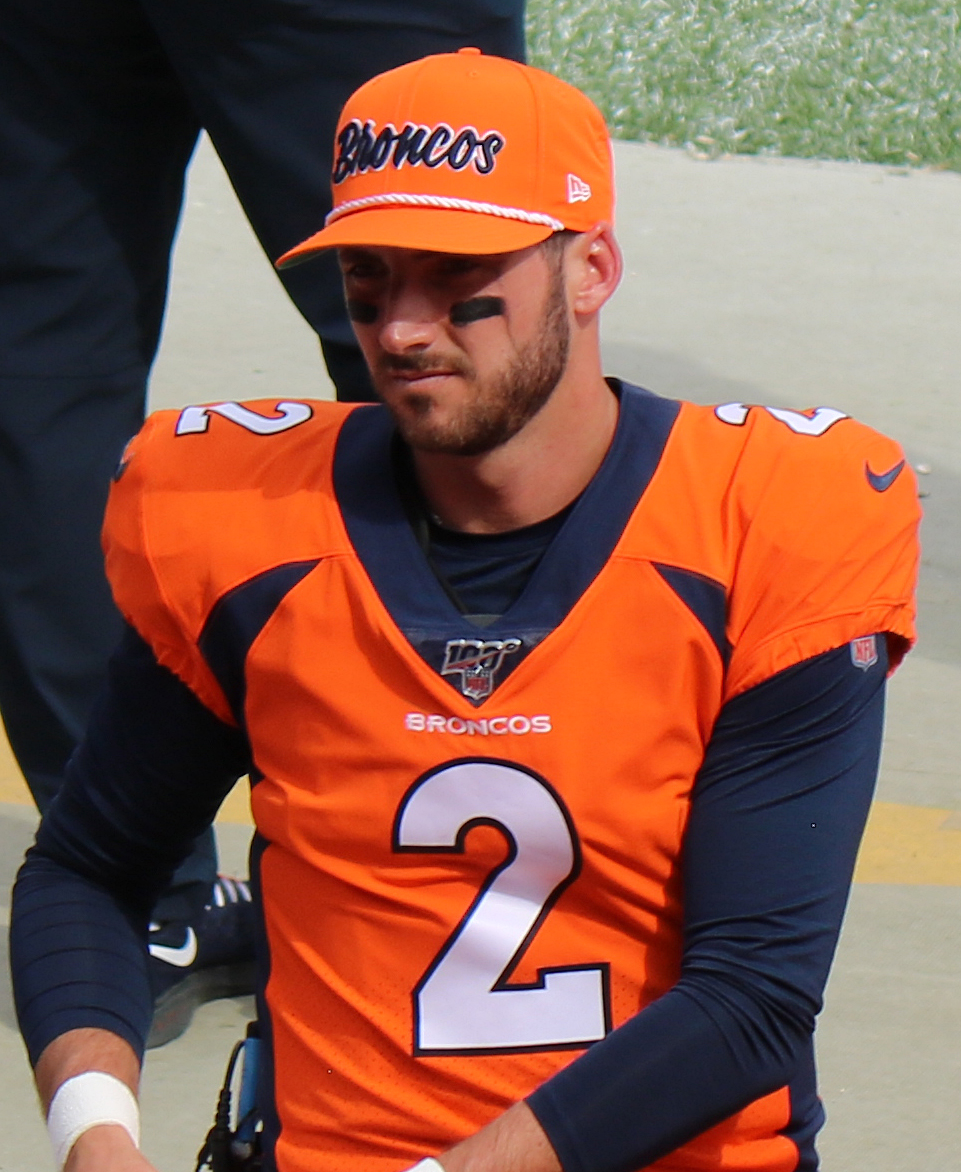
Arkansas quarterback Brandon Allen, pictured in 2019, was named the game's MVP.

Entering the contest, Arkansas was favored to win, with the spread set at 6.5 points alongside a projected total of 44.5 points. The Razorbacks' rushing offense, led by the duo of Alex Collins and Jonathan Williams, was expected to perform well. Texas's offense was expected to depend largely on the performance of quarterback Tyrone Swoopes, who had experienced struggles with interceptions throughout the year; Swoopes was thrust into the starting role after starter David Ash suffered a season-ending concussion in early September.

The game was played indoors at NRG Stadium, making weather a non-issue for the game. The officiating crew for the game was led by referee Ron Cherry and represented the Atlantic Coast Conference.

=== First half ===
Scheduled for an 8:00 p.m. CST start, the game began at 8:06 p.m., as Nick Rose's opening kickoff was returned by Alex Collins to the Arkansas 23-yard-line. The Razorbacks picked up a first down after two plays, but then stalled and were forced to punt. Texas began their opening drive at their own 8-yard-line, but committed a false start penalty, which backed them up to their own 4-yard-line. The Longhorns were unable to do much with their first possession, moving the ball to the 10-yard-line before being forced to punt themselves. The game's first points came on Arkansas' ensuing possession; taking the ball at the Texas 48-yard-line, the Arkansas offense was able to drive to the Texas 15-yard-line, where Adam McFain converted a 32-yard field goal to make the score 3–0. Texas advanced to their own 46-yard-line on their next possession, but was forced to punt on 4th & 17. Arkansas started their third drive pinned back at their own 13-yard-line, but advanced down the field in six plays and capped their drive with a 36-yard touchdown pass from Brandon Allen to Demetrius Wilson, increasing their lead to ten.

The game's first three-and-out came on the first Texas drive of the second quarter, and Arkansas' ensuing drive ended with a punt as well, though after eight plays rather than three. Receiving the ball inside their own 5-yard-line for the second time in the game, Texas running back Johnathan Gray was tackled in the backfield on 1st & 10 and fumbled into the end zone, resulting in an Arkansas touchdown after Taiwan Johnson recovered the ball. The Texas offense responded well; a 30-yard return on the ensuing kickoff gave Texas excellent field position, starting on the Arkansas 44-yard-line. The Longhorns drove to the Arkansas 9-yard-line in seven plays before Tyrone Swoopes scored the Longhorns' first points of the evening on a nine-yard touchdown rush. Arkansas continued to be effective on offense, as they scored their third touchdown of the quarter on their final drive before the half; a five-yard pass from Brandon Allen to Keon Hatcher on the drive's ninth play put the Razorbacks up 24–7 at halftime.

=== Second half ===
Texas received the ball to begin the third quarter, but their opening drive proved unsuccessful, as a third down sack forced a punt on 4th & 18. Taking over with great field position, at the Texas 35-yard-line, Arkansas' first drive of the second half took them down to the Texas 14-yard-line. Arkansas was unable to capitalize as Adam McFain missed a 32-yard field goal, which gave Texas possession back. The following four minutes of the quarter contained unproductive drives from both teams – the next three drives were each three-and-outs, Texas twice and Arkansas once. This stretch ended with Arkansas' next drive; starting on their own 43-yard-line, Arkansas drove 57 yards in 13 plays, converting a pair of third downs and a fourth down, en route to a one-yard rushing touchdown from Jonathan Williams. This increased Arkansas' lead to 31–7.

The Razorback lead now 24 points, each team had only a few more possessions before the end of the game. Texas' next drive started at their own 23-yard-line with just over eleven minutes remaining in the game, though the Longhorns went three-and-out and punted the ball back to Arkansas, who took over on the Texas 45-yard-line. Though they were able to successfully convert the drive's first third down, Arkansas was not able to convert the second, and they punted the ball back to Texas with five minutes to play. What would be the Longhorns' final drive of the contest began at their own 10-yard-line; the Texas offense drove to their own 39-yard-line before a Tyrone Swoopes downfield pass was intercepted by Henre' Toliver, and returned to the Texas 33-yard-line. Taking possession with three minutes on the clock, Arkansas was able to run the ball three times to pick up a first down, and was then able to line up in victory formation and run out the remainder of the clock. The game finished with Arkansas having defeated Texas, 31–7.

=== Scoring summary ===
Scoring summary

Quarter	Time	Drive			Team	Scoring information	Score	
Quarter	Time	Plays	Yards	TOP	Team	Scoring information	Arkansas	Texas
1	4:32	10	33	4:21	Arkansas	32-yard field goal by Adam McFain	3	0
2	14:15	6	87	2:44	Arkansas	Demetrius Wilson 36-yard touchdown reception from Brandon Allen, McFain kick good	10	0
2	8:13				Arkansas	Fumble recovery returned 0 yards for touchdown by Taiwan Johnson, McFain kick good	17	0
2	3:59	8	44	4:14	Texas	Tyrone Swoopes 9-yard touchdown run, Nick Rose kick good	17	7
2	0:24	9	61	3:35	Arkansas	Keon Hatcher 5-yard touchdown reception from Allen, McFain kick good	24	7
4	11:41	13	57	8:39	Arkansas	Jonathan Williams 1-yard touchdown run, McFain kick good	31	7
"TOP" = time of possession. For other American football terms, see Glossary of American football.							31	7

== Statistics ==
Team statistical comparison
Statistic	Arkansas	Texas
First downs	20	7
First downs rushing	11	1
First downs passing	7	6
First downs penalty	2	0
Third down efficiency	9–17	3–11
Fourth down efficiency	1–1	0–0
Total plays–net yards	73–351	43–59
Rushing attempts–net yards	50–191	18–2
Yards per rush	3.8	0.1
Yards passing	160	57
Pass completions–attempts	12–23	13–25
Interceptions thrown	0	1
Punt returns–total yards	1–27	1–4
Kickoff returns–total yards	2–60	5–128
Punts–total yardage	4–159	7–292
Fumbles–lost	1–0	2–1
Penalties–yards	2–15	5–34
Time of possession	41:10	18:50

Arkansas statistics
Razorbacks passing
	C–A	Yds	TD	INT
Brandon Allen	12–23	160	2	0
Razorbacks rushing
	Car	Yds	TD	Avg
Jonathan Williams	23	105	1	4.6
Alex Collins	17	76	0	4.5
Brandon Allen	6	13	0	2.2
Keon Hatcher	1	2	0	2.0
Razorbacks receiving
	Rec	Yds	TD	Avg
Demetrius Wilson	2	52	1	26.0
Keon Hatcher	4	41	1	10.3
Drew Morgan	2	33	0	16.5
Hunter Henry	1	18	0	18.0
Jared Cornelius	3	16	0	5.3

Texas statistics
Longhorns passing
	C–A	Yds	TD	INT
Tyrone Swoopes	13–25	57	0	1
Longhorns rushing
	Car	Yds	TD	Avg
Malcolm Brown	7	25	0	3.6
Johnathan Gray	6	9	0	1.5
Tyrone Swoopes	5	−32	1	−6.4
Longhorns receiving
	Rec	Yds	TD	Avg
John Harris	4	36	0	9.0
Jacore Warrick	3	13	0	4.3
Marcus Johnson	1	9	0	9.0
Jaxon Shipley	1	6	0	6.0
Daje Johnson	3	0	0	0.0
Malcolm Brown	1	−7	0	−7.0

== Aftermath ==
Following the game, Arkansas improved their record to 7–6, marking their first winning season since 2011. Texas finished the season with a record of 6–7. Arkansas' defense held the Texas offense to an unproductive game; their 59 total yards was a season-low and the Longhorns mustered only a net total of two rushing yards on 18 carries. Arkansas' defense allowed the fewest total yardage since allowing 40 total yards to Abilene Christian in 1940, and it set a new school record for the fewest total yardage ever allowed in a bowl game. Arkansas quarterback Brandon Allen was named the game's most valuable player.

A total of 71,115 people attended the game, setting a Texas Bowl record and making the game the highest-attended bowl game in the history of the city of Houston.

Arkansas would return to a bowl game the following season, defeating Kansas State in the 2016 Liberty Bowl. Texas would go two years without a bowl before another appearance, when they defeated Missouri in the 2017 Texas Bowl. The teams did not meet again until September 11, 2021, when Arkansas upset No. 15 Texas, 40–21. The teams have been conference opponents from 2024 following Texas's entry into the SEC. Their first game as SEC opponents (and their first game as conference opponents since 1991) took place in Fayetteville on November 16, 2024, and resulted in a 20–10 win for No. 3 Texas over Arkansas.
