= Denver Kirkland =

American football player (born 1994)

No. 79
- Position: Offensive guard

Personal information
- Born: March 6, 1994 (age 32); Miami, Florida, U.S.
- Listed height: 6 ft 4 in (1.93 m)
- Listed weight: 340 lb (154 kg)

Career information
- High school: Washington (Miami)
- College: Arkansas
- NFL draft: 2016: undrafted

Career history
- Oakland Raiders (2016–2018); Arizona Cardinals (2018)*; Oakland Raiders (2018)
- * Offseason or practice squad member only

Career NFL statistics
- Games played: 7
- Games started: 4
- Stats at Pro Football Reference

Denver Kirkland (born March 6, 1994) is an American former professional football player who was an offensive guard in the National Football League (NFL). He played college football for the Arkansas Razorbacks and was signed by the Oakland Raiders as an undrafted free agent in 2016.

== Early life ==
Kirkland attended Booker T. Washington High School in Miami, Florida. As a junior, he was named first-team All-State, after helping his team average 41.7 points and 44.9 total yards-per-game. As a senior, he was named first-team All-State after helping his team average 53.5 points and 431.2 yards of total offense-per-game. He was ranked as the fifth best offensive guard in the nation by Scout.com and the 13th best by 247Sports.com. He was named by ESPN as the 12th best offensive tackle in the nation and the 20th overall prospect in Florida. Rivals.com named him the 13th best offensive tackle in the nation and 19th best player overall in Florida. He was selected to play in the Under Armour All-America Game.

== College career ==
Kirkland then attended University of Arkansas where he majored in communications.

As a freshman in 2013 he appeared in all 12 games with eight starts, at guard. The offensive line broke the school's single-season record by only allowing eight sacks. For the season, he was named a freshman All-American and an SEC All-Freshman team after helping Alex Collins become the second freshman in school history and 10th true freshman in conference history to rush for 1,000 yards. As a sophomore in 2014, he started all 13 games at right guard. He averaged an offensive line grade of 79%. He allowed only one sack for the season and was penalized only three times. He helped block for running backs Collins and Jonathan Williams, where were the only FBS teammates to rush for 1,000 yards each that season. He also helped to protect quarterback Brandon Allen, only giving 14 sacks among the entire offensive line. In 2015 as a junior, Kirkland moved from right guard to left tackle where he started all 13 games, extending his consecutive start streak to 34 games over three seasons. He helped block for running back Alex Collins, helping him rush for over 1,500 yards and become the third player in conference history with three consecutive 1,000-yard season to start their career. Collins also tied for the conference lead with 10 100-yard rushing games, tying the school single-season record held by Darren McFadden. For the season Kirkland was named third-team All-SEC by Phil Steele.

On January 4, 2016, he announced he would be forgoing his senior season to enter the NFL draft.

== Professional career ==
=== Oakland Raiders ===
After going unselected in the 2016 NFL draft, Kirkland signed with the Oakland Raiders on May 12, 2016. He was released by the Raiders on September 3, 2016 and was signed to the practice squad the next day. He was promoted to the active roster on September 28, 2016, playing in six games with four starts for the Raiders.

On September 5, 2017, Kirkland was placed on injured reserve.

On September 1, 2018, Kirkland was waived by the Raiders and was re-signed to the practice squad. He was promoted to the active roster on October 23, 2018. He was waived on December 1, 2018.

=== Arizona Cardinals ===
On December 5, 2018, Kirkland was signed to the Arizona Cardinals practice squad.

=== Oakland Raiders (second stint) ===
On December 11, 2018, Kirkland was signed by the Oakland Raiders off the Cardinals practice squad. He was waived on August 31, 2019.

== Personal life ==
Kirkland is the son of Demetrica Roker.
