= 2014 Arkansas Razorbacks football team =

American college football season

2014 Arkansas Razorbacks football

Texas Bowl champion

Texas Bowl, W 31–7 vs. Texas
- Conference: Southeastern Conference
- Western Division
- Record: 7–6 (2–6 SEC)
- Head coach: Bret Bielema (2nd season)
- Offensive coordinator: Jim Chaney (2nd season)
- Offensive scheme: Pro-style
- Defensive coordinator: Robb Smith (1st season)
- Base defense: 4–3
- Captains: Brandon Allen; Brey Cook; Trey Flowers; Alan Turner
- Home stadium: Donald W. Reynolds Razorback Stadium; War Memorial Stadium

2014 Southeastern Conference football standings
	Conf.			Overall
Team	W		L	W		L
Eastern Division
No. 14 Missouri x	7	–	1	11	–	3
No. 9 Georgia	6	–	2	10	–	3
Florida	4	–	4	7	–	5
Tennessee	3	–	5	7	–	6
South Carolina	3	–	5	7	–	6
Kentucky	2	–	6	5	–	7
Vanderbilt	0	–	8	3	–	9
Western Division
No. 4 Alabama x$^	7	–	1	12	–	2
No. 11 Mississippi State	6	–	2	10	–	3
No. 17 Ole Miss *	5	–	3	9	–	4
No. 22 Auburn	4	–	4	8	–	5
LSU *	4	–	4	8	–	5
Texas A&M	3	–	5	8	–	5
Arkansas	2	–	6	7	–	6
Championship: Alabama 42, Missouri 13
^ – College Football Playoff participant; $ – Conference champion; x – Division champion/co-champions; * LSU and Ole Miss vacated all wins (except for Ole Miss' win over Presbyterian) due to NCAA violations.; Rankings from AP Poll

The 2014 Arkansas Razorbacks football team represented the University of Arkansas as a member of the Southeastern Conference (SEC) during the 2014 NCAA Division I FBS football season. Led by second-year head coach Bret Bielema, the Razorbacks compiled an overall record of 7–6 with a mark of 2–6 in conference play, placing last out of seven teams in the SEC's Western Division. Arkansas was invited to the Texas Bowl, where the Razorbacks defeated Texas. The team played five home games at Donald W. Reynolds Razorback Stadium in Fayetteville, Arkansas and two home games at War Memorial Stadium in Little Rock, Arkansas.

== Schedule ==
Date	Time	Opponent	Site	TV	Result	Attendance
August 30	3:00 p.m.	at No. 6 Auburn	Jordan–Hare Stadium; Auburn, AL	SECN	L 21–45	87,451
September 6	3:00 p.m.	Nicholls State*	Donald W. Reynolds Razorback Stadium; Fayetteville, AR	SECN	W 73–7	63,108
September 13	2:30 p.m.	at Texas Tech*	Jones AT&T Stadium; Lubbock, TX (rivalry)	ABC	W 49–28	60,277
September 20	6:00 p.m.	Northern Illinois*	Donald W. Reynolds Razorback Stadium; Fayetteville, AR	ESPNU	W 52–14	67,204
September 27	2:30 p.m.	vs. No. 6 Texas A&M	AT&T Stadium; Arlington, TX (rivalry)	CBS	L 28–35 ^{OT}	68,113
October 11	5:00 p.m.	No. 7 Alabama	Donald W. Reynolds Razorback Stadium; Fayetteville, AR (SEC Nation)	ESPN	L 13–14	72,337
October 18	3:00 p.m.	No. 10 Georgia	War Memorial Stadium; Little Rock, AR	SECN	L 32–45	54,959
October 25	11:00 a.m.	UAB*^{†}	Donald W. Reynolds Razorback Stadium; Fayetteville, AR	SECN	W 45–17	61,800
November 1	6:15 p.m.	at No. 1 Mississippi State	Davis Wade Stadium; Starkville, MS	ESPN2	L 10–17	62,307
November 15	7:00 p.m.	No. 17 LSU	Donald W. Reynolds Razorback Stadium; Fayetteville, AR (rivalry)	ESPN2	W 17–0	70,165
November 22	2:30 p.m.	No. 8 Ole Miss	Donald W. Reynolds Razorback Stadium; Fayetteville, AR (rivalry)	CBS	W 30–0	64,510
November 28	1:00 p.m.	at No. 17 Missouri	Faurot Field; Columbia, MO (rivalry)	CBS	L 14–21	71,168
December 29	8:00 p.m.	vs. Texas*	NRG Stadium; Houston, TX (Texas Bowl, rivalry)	ESPN	W 31–7	71,115
*Non-conference game; ^{†}Homecoming; Rankings from AP Poll released prior to the game; All times are in Central time

== Game summaries ==
=== At No. 6 Auburn ===
Arkansas at Auburn

Team	1	2	3	4	Total
Razorbacks	7	14	0	0	21
• No. 6 Tigers	14	7	14	10	45

- Date: August 30
- Location: Jordan–Hare Stadium
  Auburn, Alabama
- Game start: 3:00 p.m. CST
- TV announcers (SECN): Brent Musburger, Jesse Palmer, Maria Taylor

Scoring summary
1	9:37	AUB	Ray 49 pass from Johnson, Carlson kick	AUB 7–0
1	6:44	ARK	Henry 14 pass from Allen, Henson kick	Tied 7–7
1	4:01	AUB	Grant 1 rush, Carlson kick	AUB 14–7
2	13:20	AUB	Williams 18 pass from Johnson, Carlson kick	AUB 21–7
2	11:06	ARK	Derby 17 pass from Allen, Henson kick	AUB 21–14
2	4:28	ARK	Williams 6 rush, Henson kick	Tied 21–21
3	10:42	AUB	Marshall 19 rush, Carlson kick	AUB 28–21
3	2:39	AUB	Whitehead 33 INT return, Carlson kick	AUB 35–21
4	9:55	AUB	Carlson 45 field goal	AUB 38–21
4	3:15	AUB	Grant 3 rush, Carlson kick	AUB 45–21

Team	Category	Player	Statistics
Arkansas	Passing	Brandon Allen	18/31, 175 yards, 2 TD, INT
Arkansas	Rushing	Alex Collins	10 carries, 68 yards
Arkansas	Receiving	Demetrius Wilson	4 receptions, 55 yards
Auburn	Passing	Jeremy Johnson	12/16, 243 yards, 2 TD
Auburn	Rushing	Cameron Artis-Payne	26 carries, 177 yards, TD
Auburn	Receiving	D'Haquille Williams	9 receptions, 154 yards, TD

=== Nicholls State ===
Arkansas vs. Nicholls State

Team	1	2	3	4	Total
Colonels	0	0	7	0	7
• Razorbacks	35	21	7	10	73

- Date: September 6
- Location: Donald W. Reynolds Razorback Stadium
  Fayetteville, Arkansas
- Game start: 3:00 p.m. CST
- TV announcers (SECN): Matt Stewart, Cole Cubelic, Kayce Smith

Scoring summary
1	12:38	ARK	Hatcher 82 rush, Henson kick	ARK 7–0
1	10:50	ARK	Collins 33 rush, Henson kick	ARK 14–0
1	8:35	ARK	Morgan 22 pass from Allen, Henson kick	ARK 21–0
1	3:21	ARK	Hollister 7 pass from Allen, Henson kick	ARK 28–0
1	2:27	ARK	Collins 2 rush, Henson kick	ARK 35–0
2	10:24	ARK	Hatcher 50 pass from Allen, Henson kick	ARK 42–0
2	5:55	ARK	Williams 90 rush, Henson kick	ARK 49–0
2	2:55	ARK	Collins 13 rush, Henson kick	ARK 56–0
3	14:08	ARK	Cornelius 38 pass from Allen, Henson kick	ARK 63–0
3	9:15	NICH	Canty 10 pass from Henderson, Condado kick	ARK 63–7
4	14:08	ARK	Henson 22 field goal	ARK 66–7
4	3:33	ARK	Allen 5 rush, Saling kick	ARK 73–7

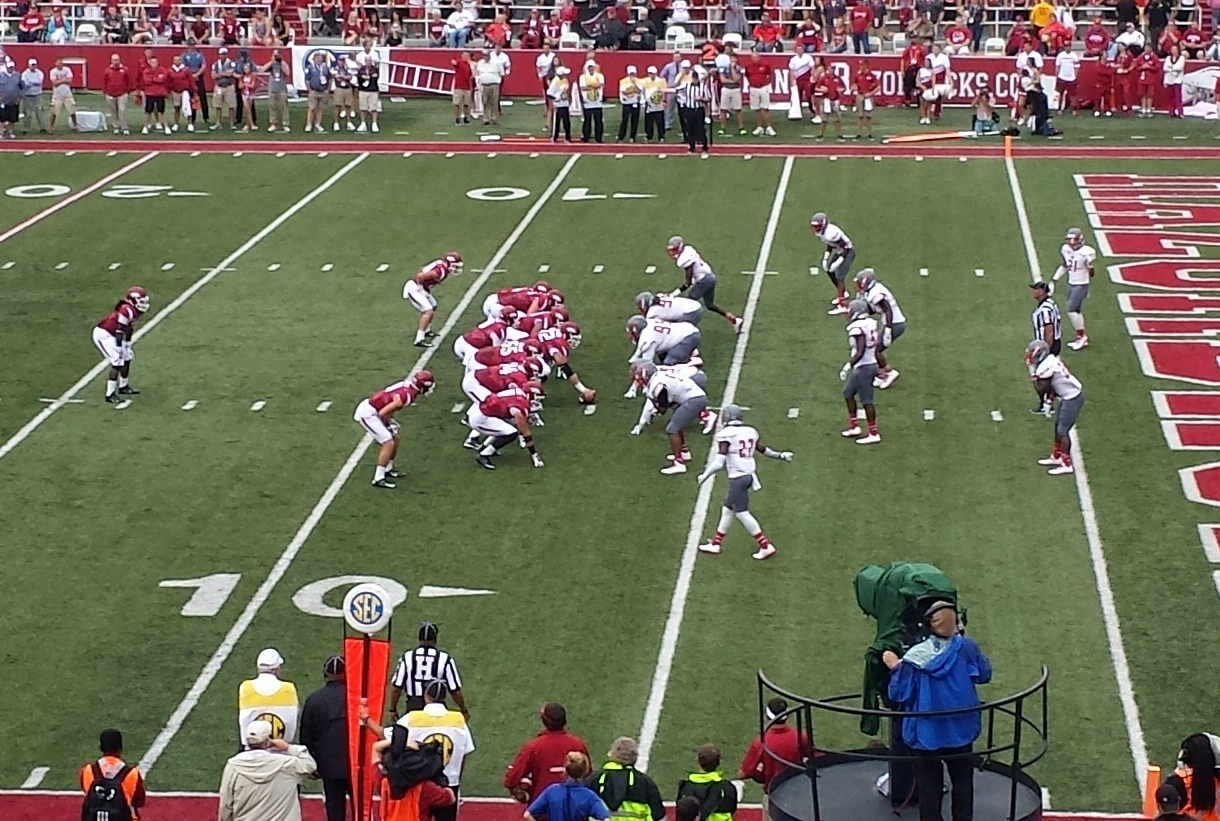
Arkansas drives toward the end zone

Team	Category	Player	Statistics
Nicholls State	Passing	Kalen Henderson	12/30, 105 yards, TD, INT
Nicholls State	Rushing	Tobias Lofton	5 carries, 36 yards
Nicholls State	Receiving	Xavier Marcus	5 receptions, 59 yards
Arkansas	Passing	Brandon Allen	4/5, 117 yards, 4 TD
Arkansas	Rushing	Jonathan Williams	4 carries, 143 yards, TD
Arkansas	Receiving	Jared Cornelius	2 receptions, 51 yards, TD

With the 73–7 victory over the Colonels, the Razorbacks managed to end their 10-game losing streak, the longest in school history. Arkansas scored 63 unanswered points before Nicholls State scored a touchdown in the third quarter. The 73 points scored are tied for the third most in school history.

=== At Texas Tech ===
Arkansas at Texas Tech

Team	1	2	3	4	Total
• Razorbacks	14	14	7	14	49
Red Raiders	7	14	7	0	28

- Date: September 13
- Location: Jones AT&T Stadium
  Lubbock, Texas
- Game start: 2:30 p.m. CST
- TV announcers (ABC): Mike Patrick, Ed Cunningham, Jeannine Edwards

Team	Category	Player	Statistics
Arkansas	Passing	Brandon Allen	6/12, 61 yards
Arkansas	Rushing	Alex Collins	27 carries, 212 yards, 2 TD
Arkansas	Receiving	Keon Hatcher	2 receptions, 22 yards
Texas Tech	Passing	Davis Webb	27/45, 252 yards, 3 TD, 2 INT
Texas Tech	Rushing	DeAndré Washington	8 carries, 51 yards
Texas Tech	Receiving	Jakeem Grant	6 receptions, 85 yards, TD

The win against the Red Raiders gave Arkansas their first back-to-back wins since September 2013. The Razorbacks had 31 first downs during the game, only punting the ball once, while racking up 438 rushing yards on 68 carries.

=== Northern Illinois ===
Arkansas vs. Northern Illinois

Team	1	2	3	4	Total
Huskies	0	7	0	7	14
• Razorbacks	21	7	7	17	52

- Date: September 20
- Location: Reynolds Razorback Stadium
  Fayetteville, Arkansas
- Game start: 7:00 p.m. CST
- TV announcers (ESPNU): Anish Shroff, Kelly Stouffer, Cara Capuano

Team	Category	Player	Statistics
Northern Illinois	Passing	Drew Hare	18/29, 179 yards, 2 TD
Northern Illinois	Rushing	Cameron Stingly	10 carries, 49 yards
Northern Illinois	Receiving	Joel Bouagnon	5 receptions, 71 yards, TD
Arkansas	Passing	Brandon Allen	15/22, 199 yards, 2 TD
Arkansas	Rushing	Alex Collins	15 carries, 79 yards
Arkansas	Receiving	Keon Hatcher	6 receptions, 107 yards, TD

The Razorbacks got their first score of the game when Korliss Marshall returned the opening kick 97 yards for a touchdown; this was the first time since 2009 vs Missouri State that Arkansas returned the opening kick for a touchdown. Unfortunately, Marshall would be dismissed from the team later in the season. With the win, Arkansas had outscored their previous three opponents 174-49.

=== At No. 6 Texas A&M ===
Southwest Classic

Team	1	2	3	4	OT	Total
Razorbacks	7	14	7	0	0	28
• No. 6 Aggies	7	7	0	14	7	35

- Date: September 27
- Location: AT&T Stadium
  Arlington, Texas
- Game start: 2:30 p.m. CST
- TV announcers (CBS): Verne Lundquist, Gary Danielson, Allie LaForce

Team	Category	Player	Statistics
Arkansas	Passing	Brandon Allen	15/27, 199 yards, TD
Arkansas	Rushing	Alex Collins	21 carries, 131 yards, TD
Arkansas	Receiving	A. J. Derby	3 receptions, 58 yards, TD
Texas A&M	Passing	Kenny Hill	21/41, 386 yards, 4 TD, INT
Texas A&M	Rushing	Tra Carson	8 carries, 55 yards
Texas A&M	Receiving	Edward Pope	4 receptions, 151 yards, 2 TD

The Aggies scored a touchdown and extra point in the first minute of the game, but the Razorbacks quickly overtook them, maintaining a lead that was not broken until the Aggies scored in overtime. The Aggies lagged for much of the game but came back in the final quarter, sending the game into overtime tied at 28. The Aggies won the coin toss and quickly threw a 25-yard touchdown and converted the extra point. The Razorbacks were unable to convert a first down and lost 35-28.

=== vs No. 7 Alabama ===
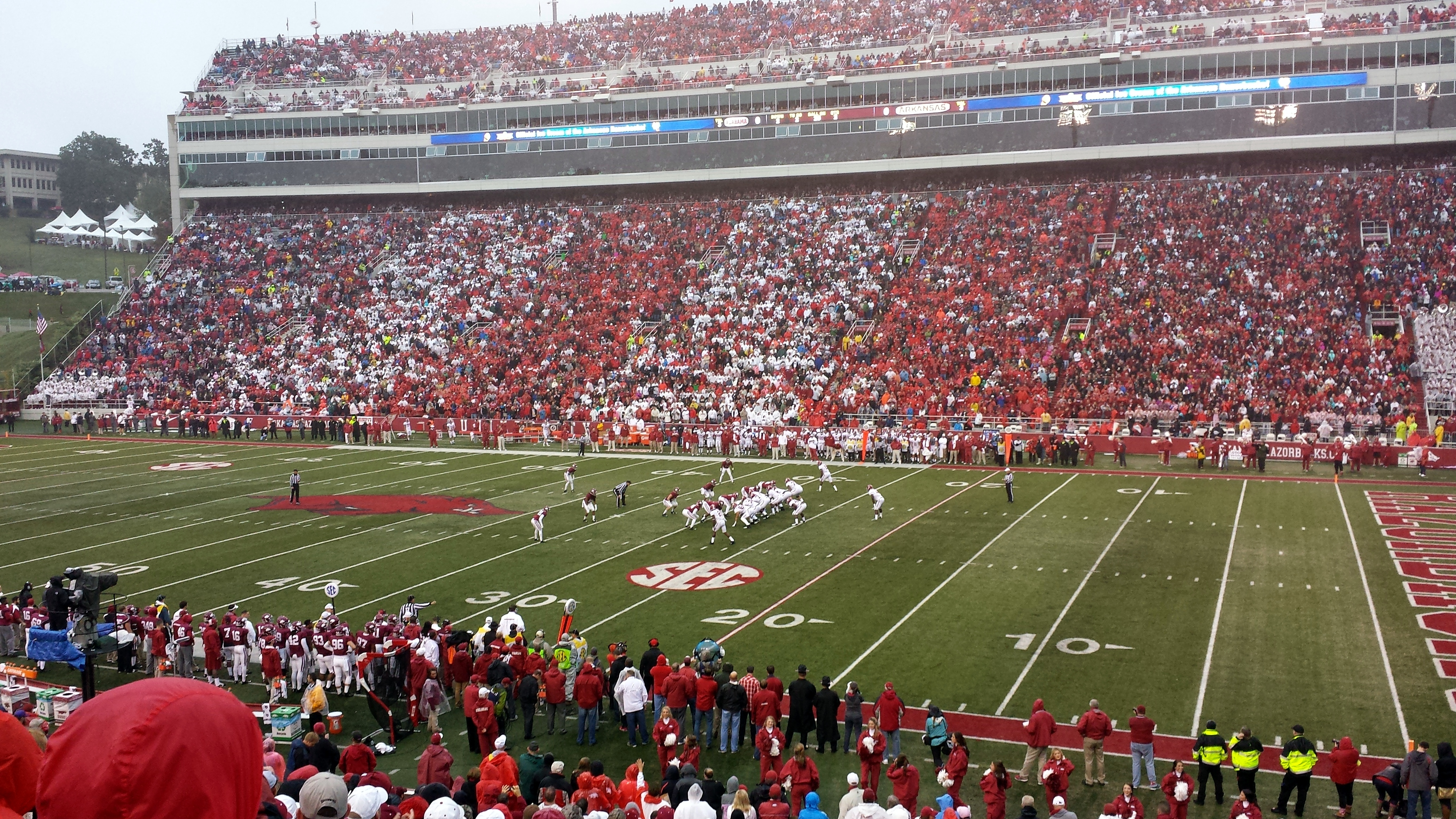
An early Crimson Tide drive

Arkansas vs. Alabama

Team	1	2	3	4	Total
• No. 7 Crimson Tide	0	7	0	7	14
Razorbacks	0	6	0	7	13

- Date: October 11
- Location: Reynolds Razorback Stadium
  Fayetteville, Arkansas
- Game start: 5:00 p.m. CST
- TV announcers (ESPN): Joe Tessitore, Brock Huard, Shannon Spake

Team	Category	Player	Statistics
Alabama	Passing	Blake Sims	11/21, 161 yards, 2 TD
Alabama	Rushing	T. J. Yeldon	16 carries, 45 yards
Alabama	Receiving	O. J. Howard	1 reception, 47 yards
Arkansas	Passing	Brandon Allen	21/40, 246 yards, TD, INT
Arkansas	Rushing	Jonathan Williams	20 carries, 83 yards, TD
Arkansas	Receiving	A. J. Derby	4 receptions, 77 yards, TD

=== vs No. 10 Georgia ===
Arkansas vs. Georgia

Team	1	2	3	4	Total
• No. 10 Bulldogs	7	31	0	7	45
Razorbacks	6	0	13	13	32

- Date: October 18
- Location: War Memorial Stadium
  Little Rock, Arkansas
- Game start: 3:00 CST
- TV announcers (SECN): Dave Neal, Andre Ware, Laura Rutledge

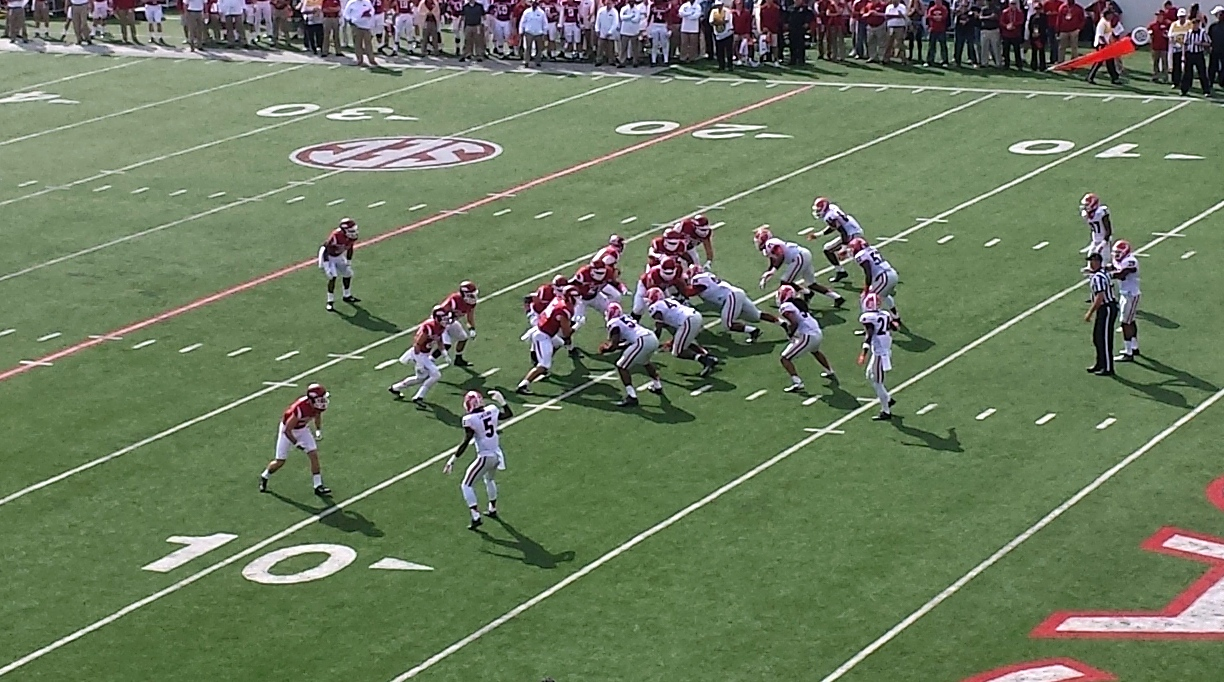
The opening Arkansas drive

Team	Category	Player	Statistics
Georgia	Passing	Hutson Mason	10/17, 179 yards, 2 TD
Georgia	Rushing	Nick Chubb	30 carries, 202 yards, 2 TD
Georgia	Receiving	Chris Conley	5 receptions, 128 yards, TD
Arkansas	Passing	Brandon Allen	28/45, 296 yards, 3 TD, 2 INT
Arkansas	Rushing	Jonathan Williams	18 carries, 108 yards
Arkansas	Receiving	Hunter Henry	5 receptions, 92 yards

=== vs UAB ===
Arkansas vs. UAB

Team	1	2	3	4	Total
Blazers	0	0	10	7	17
• Razorbacks	14	21	10	0	45

- Date: October 25
- Location: Reynolds Razorback Stadium
  Fayetteville, Arkansas
- Game start: 11:00 CST
- TV announcers (SECN): Dave Neal, Andre Ware, Laura Rutledge

Team	Category	Player	Statistics
UAB	Passing	Jeremiah Briscoe	6/18, 62 yards, TD, INT
UAB	Rushing	Jordan Howard	19 carries, 90 yards
UAB	Receiving	Nyiakki Height	1 reception, 33 yards, TD
Arkansas	Passing	Brandon Allen	15/24, 205 yards, 2 TD
Arkansas	Rushing	Jonathan Williams	18 carries, 153 yards, 1 TD
Arkansas	Receiving	Drew Morgan	1 reception, 44 yards

=== At No. 1 Mississippi State ===
Arkansas at Mississippi State

Team	1	2	3	4	Total
Razorbacks	3	7	0	0	10
• No. 1 Bulldogs	0	7	3	7	17

- Date: November 1
- Location: Davis Wade Stadium
  Starkville, Mississippi
- Game start: 6:15 CST
- TV announcers (ESPN2): Joe Tessitore, Brock Huard, Shannon Spake

Team	Category	Player	Statistics
Arkansas	Passing	Brandon Allen	22/43, 238 yards, INT
Arkansas	Rushing	Alex Collins	16 carries, 93 yards, TD
Arkansas	Receiving	Hunter Henry	7 receptions, 110 yards
Mississippi State	Passing	Dak Prescott	18/27, 331 yards, TD, 2 INT
Mississippi State	Rushing	Josh Robinson	19 carries, 64 yards, TD
Mississippi State	Receiving	Josh Robinson	6 receptions, 110 yards

=== Vs. No. 17 LSU ===
Battle for the Golden Boot

Team	1	2	3	4	Total
No. 17 LSU	0	0	0	0	0
• Razorbacks	3	7	0	7	17

- Date: November 15
- Location: Reynolds Razorback Stadium
  Fayetteville, Arkansas
- Game start: 7:00 CST
- TV announcers (ESPN2): Joe Tessitore, Brock Huard, Shannon Spake

Team	Category	Player	Statistics
LSU	Passing	Anthony Jennings	12/22, 87 yards
LSU	Rushing	Terrence Magee	7 carries, 24 yards
LSU	Receiving	Travin Dural	5 receptions, 46 yards
Arkansas	Passing	Brandon Allen	16/27, 169 yards
Arkansas	Rushing	Jonathan Williams	18 carries, 55 yards, TD
Arkansas	Receiving	Hunter Henry	4 receptions, 54 yards

This was the first win in SEC play since October 13, 2012, when the Razorbacks beat Kentucky 49-7 and their first win over LSU since 2010. It was the first time Arkansas shut out LSU in a conference game. The Hogs also took home the Golden Boot, a trophy which goes to the winner of each game and remains at that school until the following years contest.

=== Vs. No. 8 Ole Miss ===
Arkansas vs. Ole Miss

Team	1	2	3	4	Total
No. 8 Ole Miss	0	0	0	0	0
• Razorbacks	17	0	10	3	30

- Date: November 22
- Location: Reynolds Razorback Stadium
  Fayetteville, Arkansas
- Game start: 2:30 CST
- TV announcers (CBS): Verne Lundquist, Gary Danielson, Allie LaForce

Team	Category	Player	Statistics
Ole Miss	Passing	Bo Wallace	16/31, 235 yards, 2 INT
Ole Miss	Rushing	Jaylen Walton	7 carries, 37 yards
Ole Miss	Receiving	Quincy Adeboyejo	6 receptions, 73 yards
Arkansas	Passing	Brandon Allen	5/10, 87 yards, TD
Arkansas	Rushing	Jonathan Williams	20 carries, 81 yards
Arkansas	Receiving	Keon Hatcher	2 receptions, 58 yards, TD

Arkansas dominated the Rebels in this matchup as they became the first unranked team ever to shut out two ranked opponents in consecutive games, and got bowl eligible for the first time since 2011.

=== At No. 17 Missouri ===
Arkansas at Missouri

Team	1	2	3	4	Total
Arkansas	7	7	0	0	14
• No. 17 Missouri	0	6	0	15	21

- Date: November 28
- Location: Faurot Field
  Columbia, Missouri
- Game start: 1:00 CST
- TV announcers (CBS): Carter Blackburn, Aaron Taylor, Jamie Erdahl

Team	Category	Player	Statistics
Arkansas	Passing	Brandon Allen	13/30, 133 yards, 2 TD
Arkansas	Rushing	Jonathan Williams	13 carries, 72 yards
Arkansas	Receiving	Hunter Henry	4 receptions, 48 yards
Missouri	Passing	Maty Mauk	25/42, 265 yards, TD, INT
Missouri	Rushing	Russell Hansbrough	20 carries, 91 yards
Missouri	Receiving	Bud Sasser	9 receptions, 127 yards

In the first annual "Battle Line Rivalry" game between these two schools, Missouri overcame an Arkansas lead in the fourth quarter to win this inaugural contest.

=== Vs. Texas–Texas Bowl ===
This matchup of former Southwest Conference rivals was only the fifth time the Hogs and Horns have met since Arkansas left the old SWC following the 1991 season. The Razorbacks beat Texas in the 2000 Cotton Bowl, and in 2003 in Austin. The Longhorns defeated Arkansas in Fayetteville in 2004, and in Austin in 2008. Texas is coached by native-Arkansan Charlie Strong.

Texas Bowl

Team	1	2	3	4	Total
• Razorbacks	3	21	0	7	31
Longhorns	0	7	0	0	7

- Date: December 29
- Location: NRG Stadium
  Houston, Texas
- Game start: 8:00 CST
- TV announcers (ESPN/ESPN Radio): Dave Pasch, Brian Griese, Tom Luginbill/Adam Amin, John Congemi, Kayce Smith

Team	Category	Player	Statistics
Arkansas	Passing	Brandon Allen	12/23, 160 yards, 2 TD
Arkansas	Rushing	Jonathan Williams	23 carries, 105 yards, TD
Arkansas	Receiving	Demetrius Wilson	2 receptions, 52 yards, TD
Texas	Passing	Tyrone Swoopes	13/25, 57 yards, INT
Texas	Rushing	Malcolm Brown	7 carries, 25 yards
Texas	Receiving	John Harris	4 receptions, 36 yards

== Personnel ==
=== Coaching staff ===
Name	Position	Seasons at Arkansas	Alma mater
Bret Bielema	Head coach	2	Iowa (1992)
Jim Chaney	Offensive coordinator/quarterbacks	2	Central Missouri State (1985)
Sam Pittman	Associate head coach/offensive line/recruiting coordinator	2	Pittsburg State (1986)
Barry Lunney Jr.	Tight ends	2	Arkansas (1996)
Michael Smith	Wide receivers	2	Kansas State (1991)
Joel Thomas	Running backs	2	Idaho (1998)
Robb Smith	Defensive coordinator/secondary	1	Allegheny College (1997)
Randy Shannon	Senior Associate head coach/linebackers	2	Miami (FL) (1989)
Clay Jennings	Secondary	1	North Texas (1996)
Rory Segrest	Defensive line/specialists	1	Alabama (1996)
Ernest "E. K." Franks	Director of recruiting	1	Kansas State (2002)
