= Alex Collins (American football) =

American football player (1994–2023)

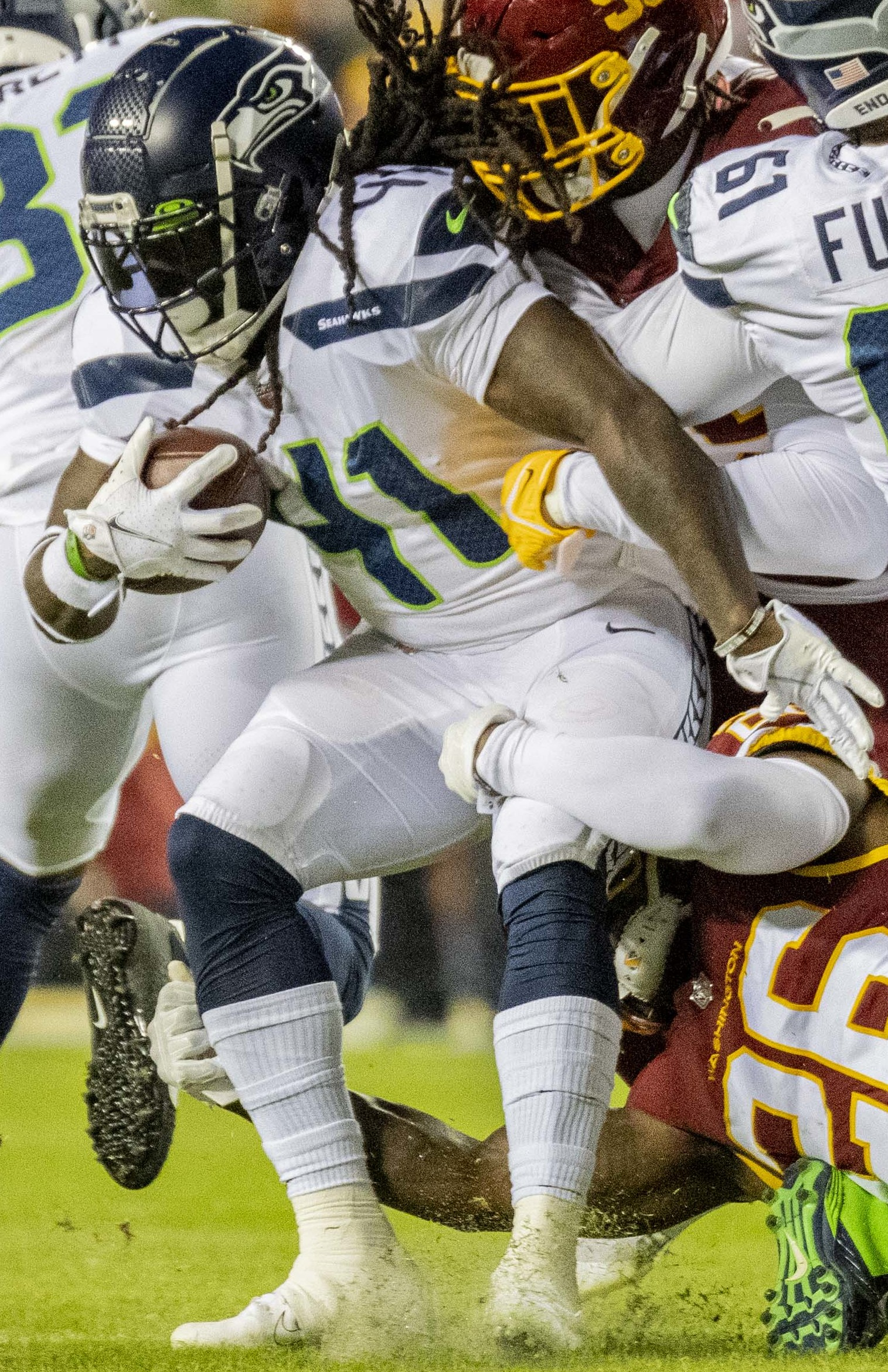
- Collins with the Seattle Seahawks in 2021

No. 36, 34, 41, 2
- Position: Running back

Personal information
- Born: August 26, 1994; Fort Lauderdale, Florida, U.S.
- Died: August 13, 2023 (aged 28); Lauderdale Lakes, Florida, U.S.
- Listed height: 5 ft 10 in (1.78 m)
- Listed weight: 210 lb (95 kg)

Career information
- High school: South Plantation (Plantation, Florida)
- College: Arkansas (2013–2015)
- NFL draft: 2016: 5th round, 171st overall pick

Career history
- Seattle Seahawks (2016); Baltimore Ravens (2017–2018); Seattle Seahawks (2020–2021); Memphis Showboats (2023)

Awards and highlights
- Second-team All-SEC (2015); SEC Freshman of the Year (2013)

Career NFL statistics
- Rushing yards: 1,997
- Rushing average: 4.1
- Rushing touchdowns: 18
- Receptions: 59
- Receiving yards: 467
- Receiving touchdowns: 1
- Stats at Pro Football Reference

Alex Collins (August 26, 1994 – August 13, 2023), was an American professional football player who was a running back in the National Football League (NFL). He played college football for the Arkansas Razorbacks and was selected by the Seattle Seahawks in the fifth round of the 2016 NFL draft with the 171st overall pick. He spent two seasons with the Baltimore Ravens in 2017 and 2018 before re-signing by Seattle in 2020. He played one season with the Memphis Showboats of the United States Football League (USFL).

== Early life ==
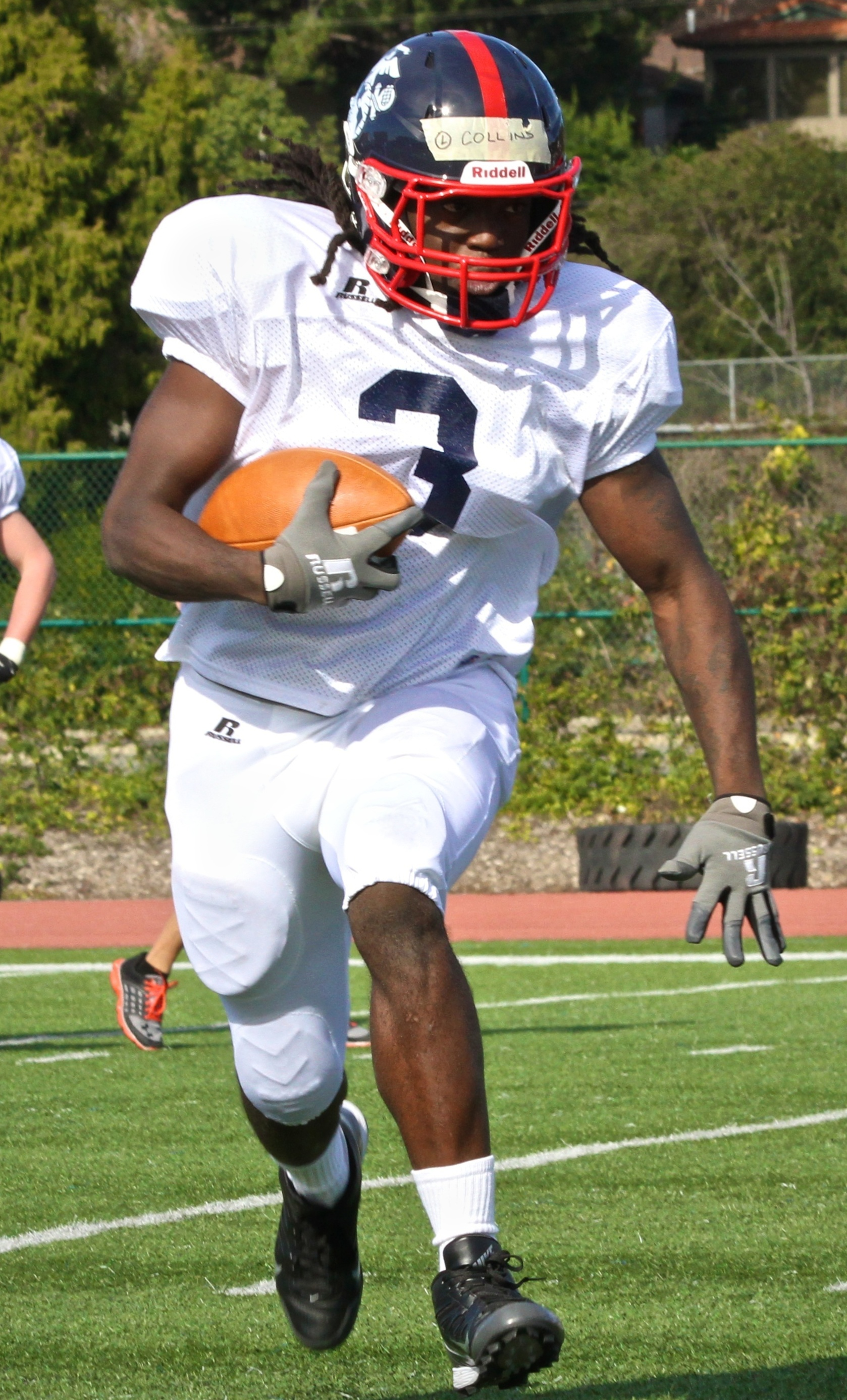
Collins in high school in 2012

Alex Collins was born on August 26, 1994, in Fort Lauderdale, Florida. He attended South Plantation High School in Fort Lauderdale where he was a letterman in football, basketball, lacrosse, and track. He was named Broward County Player of the Year as a junior after rushing for 1,786 yards and 28 touchdowns as the Paladins earned seven victories and qualified for the state playoffs. As a senior, he rushed for 1,400 yards and 14 touchdowns despite missing three games due to injury, helping South Plantation to nine wins, the district title and a berth in the 8A state playoffs. Following his senior season, he was selected to play in the Semper Fidelis All-American Bowl, where he was teammates with fellow Arkansas signee Austin Allen.

Also a talented sprinter, Collins ran the third leg on South Plantation's state-champion 4 × 100 m relay (41.98 s), leading to him being named the 2013 Broward County Male Athlete of the Year.

Collins was ranked as a four-star recruit by Rivals.com and the 13th best running back in his class. Collins committed to play college football at the University of Arkansas in February 2013.

On signing day, Collins's mother provided some momentary drama, when she refused to sign the National Letter of Intent (LOI) for him to attend school at Arkansas, and then ran away with the LOI. She wanted Collins to stay close to home and attend the University of Miami. The drama ended the next day when Arkansas head coach Bret Bielema faxed another LOI to Collins, which was signed by his father.

== College career ==
Collins played for the University of Arkansas from 2013 to 2015. He started his career as the first true freshman in Southeastern Conference (SEC) history to rush for 300 yards in his first three games. Splitting time with Jonathan Williams, he finished the year with 1,026 rushing yards on 190 carries with four touchdowns. For his play he was named the 2013 SEC Freshman of the Year.

In his sophomore season in 2014, Collins ran for 1,100 yards and 12 touchdowns on 204 carries, while still splitting time with Williams. He also helped lead Arkansas to a Texas Bowl victory over the Texas Longhorns.

Williams went down with an injury before the 2015 season, so Collins became the featured back in Bret Bielema's offense. He started every game his junior year, and on November 7, 2015, with 108 yards against Ole Miss, Collins became only the third player in SEC history to rush for 1,000 plus yards in three seasons, joining Herschel Walker and Darren McFadden. Collins finished his junior season with a career-high 1,577 yards, and a school-record 20 rushing touchdowns. He was named second-team all-SEC, mostly because Alabama's Derrick Henry and LSU's Leonard Fournette outrushed him and were All-Americans. Collins led Arkansas to a Liberty Bowl victory over Kansas State on January 2, 2016. He finished the 45–23 victory with 185 yards and three rushing touchdowns, earning MVP honors.

Collins is second on the Razorback career rushing yards list (3,703), behind only Darren McFadden (4,590).

=== Statistics ===
Season	Team	Conf	Class	Pos	GP	Rushing				Receiving			
Season	Team	Conf	Class	Pos	GP	Att	Yds	Avg	TD	Rec	Yds	Avg	TD
2013	Arkansas	SEC	FR	RB	12	190	1,026	5.4	4	11	63	5.7	0
2014	Arkansas	SEC	SO	RB	13	204	1,100	5.4	12	3	9	3.0	0
2015	Arkansas	SEC	JR	RB	13	271	1,577	5.8	20	13	95	7.3	0
Career					38	665	3,703	5.6	36	27	167	6.2	0

== Professional career ==
=== Pre-draft ===
On January 10, 2016, Collins penned an open letter to Arkansas fans announcing his intention to forgo his senior season and enter the 2016 NFL draft. He was projected to be third round pick and was ranked the third best running back by CBSSports.com prior to the combine. He attended the NFL Combine and completed nearly all of the required drills, but chose to not perform the short shuttle or three-cone drill due to a headache. His combine performance was described as underwhelming and mediocre. On March 16, 2016, Collins opted to participate at Arkansas's pro day along with teammates Hunter Henry, Brandon Allen, Jonathan Williams, Denver Kirkland, Mitchell Loewen, Sebastian Tretola, and five others. He performed positional drills and added four inches to his vertical, finishing with a 32½. On April 12, 2016, it was reported that Collins had a pre-draft visit with representatives from the Miami Dolphins. At the conclusion of the pre-draft process, Collins was projected to be a third or fourth round pick by the majority of NFL draft experts and analysts. He was ranked the fifth best running back in the draft by Sports Illustrated and Pro Football Focus. Collins was also ranked the tenth best running back by NFLDraftScout.com.

Pre-draft measurables
Height	Weight	Arm length	Hand span	40-yard dash	10-yard split	20-yard split	Vertical jump	Broad jump	Bench press
5 ft 10 in (1.78 m)	217 lb (98 kg)	30 1/4 in (0.77 m)	9 1/4 in (0.23 m)	4.59 s	1.62 s	2.70 s	28.5 in (0.72 m)	9 ft 5 in (2.87 m)	18 reps
Values from NFL Combine

=== Seattle Seahawks (first stint) ===
==== 2016 ====
The Seattle Seahawks selected Collins in the fifth round (171st overall) of the 2016 NFL Draft. He was the 13th running back selected in the 2016 NFL Draft and one of three running backs the Seahawks drafted in 2016, along with C. J. Prosise (third round, 90th overall) and Zac Brooks (seventh round, 247th overall). His former teammate and backup at Arkansas, Jonathan Williams, was selected before him by the Buffalo Bills in the fifth round (156th overall). On May 6, 2016, Collins signed a four-year deal worth $2.2 million overall with a $184,000 bonus.

Upon arriving at the Seahawks' training camp, Collins began competing with Thomas Rawls, Christine Michael, Prosise, Brooks, and Troymaine Pope for the role as the starting running back after it was left vacant by the retirement of Marshawn Lynch. Collins had an impressive training camp and was given a chance to showcase his abilities after Rawls missed the starts of training camp while still recovering from injury and Prosise missed a stretch of camp with a hamstring injury. After a mediocre preseason, head coach Pete Carroll named Collins the fourth running back on the Seahawks' depth chart behind Michael, Rawls, and Prosise.

He made his professional regular season debut in the Seahawks' Week 2 matchup against the Los Angeles Rams, but had no gain on two carries in their 9–3 loss. The next week, Collins had 12 rushing yards on four carries and made the first two receptions of his career for 19 receiving yards in a 37–18 victory over the San Francisco 49ers. He caught his first career pass from Russell Wilson and gained nine-yards in the first quarter. On October 16, 2016, Collins had a nine-yard reception and one carry for a two-yard gain and the first touchdown of his career during Seattle's 26–24 defeat over the Atlanta Falcons. Collins finished his rookie season with 31 carries for 125 rushing yards and one rushing touchdown, in 11 games. He also caught 11 passes for 84 receiving yards. Collins also had eight carries for rushing 27 yards and three receptions for 28 receiving yards in two playoff games.

After a 10–5–1 season, the Seahawks finished atop the NFC West and received a playoff berth. On January 7, 2017, Collins had six carries for 13 rushing yards and one 11-yard reception in the Seahawks' 26–6 victory over the Detroit Lions in the Wild Card Round. They lost the following game to the Falcons by a score of 36–20 in the Divisional Round.

==== 2017 ====
Collins competed with Rawls, Eddie Lacy, Chris Carson, Mike Davis, Prosise, and J. D. McKissic throughout training camp for the job as starting running back. On August 30, 2017, it was reported that the Seahawks were fielding trade offers for Collins and cornerback Jeremy Lane. The Seahawks had no role for Collins after Lacy, Rawls, and Prosise were slated to have the bulk of the carries.

On September 2, 2017, Collins was waived by the Seahawks.

=== Baltimore Ravens ===
==== 2017 ====
On September 5, 2017, Collins was signed to the practice squad of the Baltimore Ravens. The Ravens signed Collins and former Chicago Bears running back Jeremy Langford to provide depth after Kenneth Dixon tore his meniscus in training camp.

On September 16, 2017, Collins was promoted to the active roster after Danny Woodhead was injured in the season-opener and was estimated to miss four-to-six weeks. Head coach John Harbaugh named him the Ravens' third running back on the depth chart, behind Terrance West and Javorius Allen. The following day, Collins made his Ravens debut and had seven carries for 42 rushing yards and one fumble in the 24–10 victory over the Cleveland Browns. On October 10, 2017, Collins earned his first career start against the Pittsburgh Steelers and finished the 26–9 loss with nine carries for 82 rushing yards and a fumble. During a Week 8 matchup against the Miami Dolphins on Thursday Night Football, he rushed for a career high of 113 yards on 18 carries and also caught two passes for 30 yards in the Ravens' 40–0 victory. Although Woodhead returned in Week 9, Collins remained the starting running back and maintained his carries.

On November 19, 2017, Collins made his fifth consecutive start and rushed for 49 yards on 20 carries while also scoring his first rushing touchdown of the season on a three-yard run in the fourth quarter of a 23–0 defeat over the Green Bay Packers. He had seven consecutive games without a fumble after analysts criticized him for fumbling twice in three games and worried about his ball security moving forward. On November 27, 2017, he had 16 carries for 60 rushing yards and scored an eight-yard touchdown run in a 23–16 win against the Houston Texans.

The following week, Collins had 75 rushing yards and 23 receiving yards to go along with a career-high two touchdowns in a 44–20 win over the Detroit Lions. In the next game, on Sunday Night Football against the Steelers, he ran the ball 18 times for 120 yards and a touchdown, as well as catching two passes for 46 yards, helping the Ravens total 152 yards on the ground. Despite what was arguably the best game of his career so far, the Steelers narrowly escaped with a win in the 39–38 shootout.

Collins led the Ravens in rushing yards for the 2017 season with 973 yards, along with six rushing touchdowns.

==== 2018 ====
Collins entered the 2018 season slated as the Ravens starting running back. He started 10 games, recording 411 rushing yards and seven touchdowns along with 15 receptions for 105 yards and one touchdown. He was placed on injured reserve on December 1, 2018, with a foot injury.

==== 2019 ====
On March 1, 2019, Collins was waived by the Ravens after he was arrested following a car crash that morning. On October 3, 2019, he pleaded guilty to possession of more than 10 grams of marijuana and possession of a handgun in a vehicle and received a sentence of 18 months of unsupervised probation. He was suspended three weeks by the NFL on November 1, 2019, for violating the league's personal conduct policy. He was reinstated from suspension on November 19, 2019.

=== Seattle Seahawks (second stint) ===
On November 4, 2020, Collins was signed to the Seahawks' practice squad. He was elevated to the active roster on November 7, 2020, November 14, 2020, and January 2, 2021, for the team's weeks 9, 10, and 17 games against the Bills, Rams, and 49ers, and reverted to the practice squad after each game. He scored a touchdown against the Rams. Against the 49ers, he ran the ball for 29 yards on five carries, including a game-sealing eight-yard touchdown run with less than two minutes left. He was elevated again for the team's Wild Card Round game against the Rams, and reverted to the practice squad again following the game. His practice squad contract with the team expired after the season on January 18, 2021.

Collins re-signed with the team on February 24, 2021. In the 2021 season, Collins finished with 108 carries for 411 rushing yards and two rushing touchdowns to go along with nine receptions for 87 receiving yards. He started six games.

=== Memphis Showboats ===
On January 14, 2023, Collins signed with the Memphis Showboats of the United States Football League (USFL). On April 29, 2023, in a game against the Houston Gamblers, he threw a touchdown pass. Collins was placed on the team's injured reserve list on May 4.

== Death ==
Collins was killed in a traffic collision in Lauderdale Lakes, Florida, on the evening of August 13, 2023, when the motorcycle that he was riding crashed into the rear passenger side of an SUV at high speed. He was pronounced dead at the scene, and it was later reported that he likely died instantly.

== See also ==
- List of gridiron football players who died during their careers
