= Hunter Henry =

American football player (born 1994)

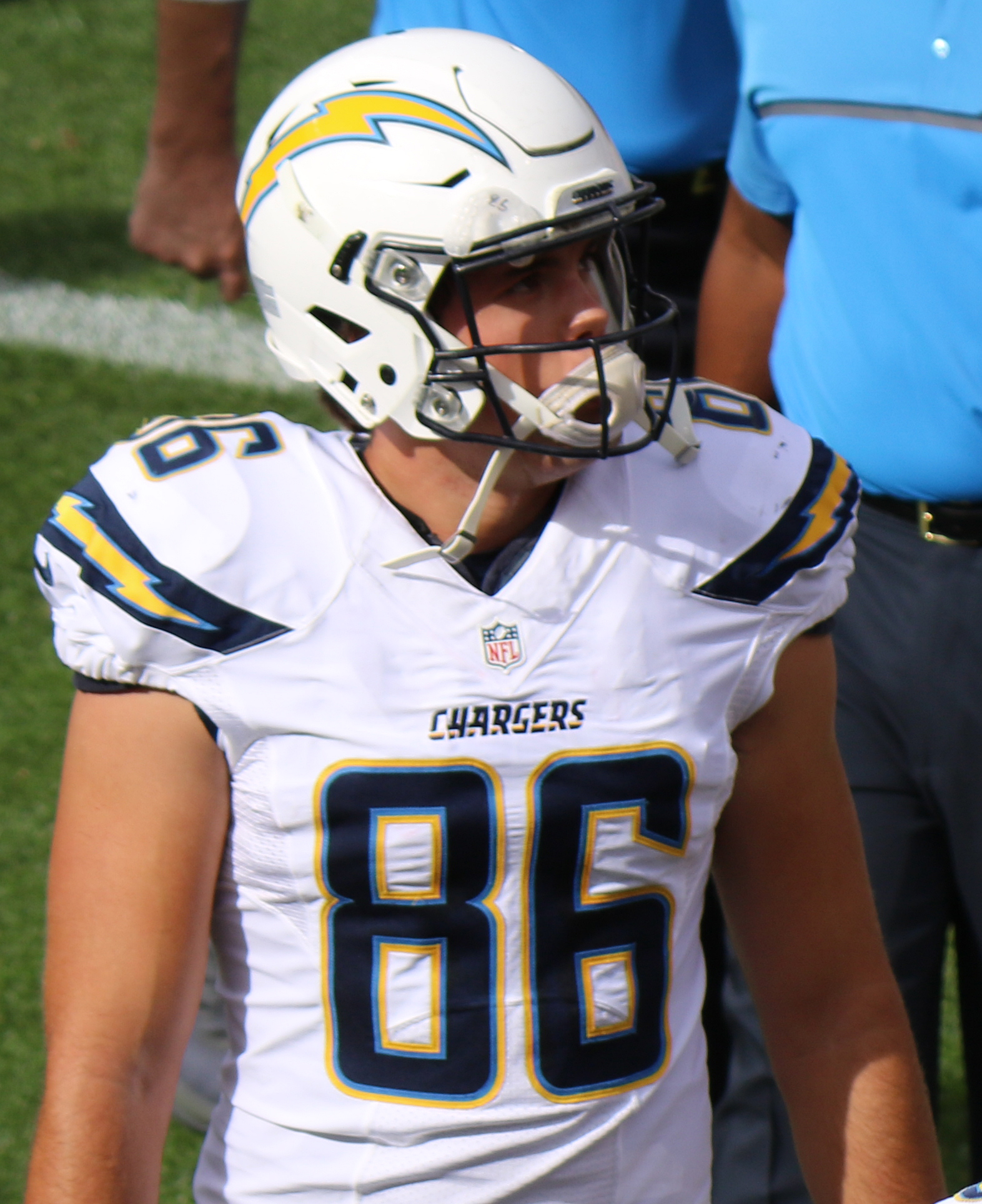
- Henry with the San Diego Chargers in 2016

No. 85 – New England Patriots
- Position: Tight end
- Roster status: Active

Personal information
- Born: December 7, 1994 (age 31); Little Rock, Arkansas, U.S.
- Listed height: 6 ft 5 in (1.96 m)
- Listed weight: 249 lb (113 kg)

Career information
- High school: Pulaski Academy (Little Rock)
- College: Arkansas (2013–2015)
- NFL draft: 2016: 2nd round, 35th overall pick

Career history
- San Diego / Los Angeles Chargers (2016–2020); New England Patriots (2021–present)

Awards and highlights
- PFWA All-Rookie Team (2016); John Mackey Award (2015); Unanimous All-American (2015); Freshman All-American (2013); 2× First-team All-SEC (2014, 2015); Second-team All-SEC (2013)

Career NFL statistics as of Week 5, 2026
- Receptions: 470
- Receiving yards: 5,472
- Receiving touchdowns: 48
- Stats at Pro Football Reference

Hunter Mark Henry (born December 7, 1994) is an American professional football tight end for the New England Patriots of the National Football League (NFL). He played college football for the Arkansas Razorbacks, earning unanimous All-American honors in 2015. Henry was selected by the San Diego Chargers in the second round of the 2016 NFL draft. He was a member of the Chargers for five seasons before joining the Patriots in 2021.

== Early life ==
Henry was born in Little Rock, Arkansas, on December 7, 1994, the oldest of four children born to Mark and Jenny Henry. Mark was a former offensive lineman for the Arkansas Razorbacks from 1987–1991 who lettered all four years for the Razorbacks and later became a pastor. In 2000, his family moved to the Atlanta area for his father's job. Henry moved back to Little Rock for his freshman year of high school, where he attended Pulaski Academy for four years. As a freshman, Henry spent time playing offensive tackle, wide receiver, and defensive end for the football team. He did not play tight end during his high school career, because Pulaski Academy's Spread Offense scheme did not feature that position. Henry started his sophomore, junior, and senior years, winning a state championship with the Bruins in 2011.

Henry was named to the Parade All-America team for the 2012–13 school year and was one of the top recruits in the nation.

== College career ==
He was the John Mackey Award winner for best tight end in the nation and also was a Consensus All-American in the 2015–2016 season. Henry helped Arkansas win back-to-back bowl games in consecutive years for the first time in program history, beating former Southwest Conference rival the Texas Longhorns in the 2014 Texas Bowl, and winning the 2016 Liberty Bowl over the Kansas State Wildcats.

On January 4, 2016, Henry declared he would be entering the 2016 NFL draft.

== Professional career ==
=== Pre-draft ===
In early 2016, Henry was predicted to be a late first- to second-round pick in the 2016 NFL draft. Henry skipped most physical drills at the NFL Combine but did compete in bench press with a position worst of 13 reps. Henry managed to improve on his pro day by posting a 4.66 40 yard dash and completing 21 reps in the bench press establishing himself as one of the top tight ends in the 2016 NFL draft.

Pre-draft measurables
Height	Weight	Arm length	Hand span	Wingspan	40-yard dash	10-yard split	20-yard split	20-yard shuttle	Three-cone drill	Vertical jump	Broad jump	Bench press	Wonderlic
6 ft 4 7/8 in (1.95 m)	250 lb (113 kg)	32 3/4 in (0.83 m)	9 1/4 in (0.23 m)	6 ft 6 in (1.98 m)	4.66 s	1.60 s	2.74 s	4.41 s	7.16 s	31.5 in (0.80 m)	9 ft 5 in (2.87 m)	21 reps	28
All values from NFL Combine and Pro Day

=== San Diego / Los Angeles Chargers ===
==== 2016 season ====
Henry was selected by the San Diego Chargers in the second round (35th overall) of the 2016 NFL draft. He was the first tight end to be selected in the 2016 NFL draft. In addition, he was the first of five Arkansas Razorbacks to be selected that year. On June 2, 2016, Henry and the Chargers agreed to a four-year, $6.38 million contract with $3.98 million guaranteed and a $2.84 million signing bonus.

Henry entered training camp competing to be the backup tight end, against veterans Sean McGrath and Asante Cleveland. Henry was named the Chargers' third tight end on their depth chart to begin the regular season, behind longtime Pro Bowl veteran Antonio Gates and Sean McGrath.

In his NFL debut against the Kansas City Chiefs, Henry made one reception for 20 yards in the season-opening overtime loss. The following week, he earned his first NFL start during a victory over the Jacksonville Jaguars. During a Week 4 loss to the New Orleans Saints, he caught four passes for 61 yards and scored his first NFL touchdown on a 20-yard pass from quarterback Philip Rivers. On October 13, 2016, Henry led all Chargers in receptions, making six catches for 83 yards and a touchdown in a 21–13 victory over the Denver Broncos. On December 18, he caught three passes for 37 receiving yards and a touchdown during a 19–16 loss to the Oakland Raiders. Henry has the distinction of catching the final touchdown of the Chargers' history in San Diego scoring a 12-yard touchdown in the fourth quarter of the 37–27 loss to Kansas City in the season finale.

In his rookie season, Henry scored the second-most touchdowns by a rookie tight end in the last decade (only behind Rob Gronkowski), and scored the fifth-most touchdowns by a rookie tight end in NFL history. He was named to the PFWA All-Rookie Team.

==== 2017 season ====
During Week 15 against the Chiefs, Henry left the game with a knee injury. The next day, it was revealed that he suffered a lacerated kidney and was placed on injured reserve on December 19, 2017. He finished the season with 45 receptions for 579 yards and four touchdowns.

==== 2018 season ====
On May 22, 2018, Henry suffered a torn ACL during organized team activities, and was ruled out for the entire season. On September 1, 2018, he was placed on the physically unable to perform list, giving Henry a chance to return later in the season. He was added to the active roster on January 7, 2019, ahead of their Divisional Round game, which they lost to the eventual Super Bowl LIII champion New England Patriots.

==== 2019 season ====
On September 11, 2019, it was announced that Henry suffered a tibia plateau fracture to his left knee and would be out several weeks. Henry made his return from injury in Week 6 against the Pittsburgh Steelers. In that game, Henry caught eight passes for 100 yards and two touchdowns in the 24–17 loss. Overall, Henry finished the 2019 season with 55 receptions for 652 receiving yards and five receiving touchdowns.

==== 2020 season ====
The Chargers placed the franchise tag on Henry on March 13, 2020. He signed the tag on April 16. He was placed on the reserve/COVID-19 list by the team on December 24, 2020, and activated on January 7, 2021. He finished the 2020 season with 60 receptions for 613 receiving yards and four receiving touchdowns.

=== New England Patriots ===
On March 19, 2021, Henry signed a three-year, $37.5 million contract with the New England Patriots. He scored his first touchdown for the Patriots in Week 4 during a 17–19 home loss to the Tampa Bay Buccaneers. Over the first 10 games, Henry caught seven touchdown passes, establishing himself as a frequent red zone target for rookie quarterback Mac Jones. He finished the 2021 season with 50 receptions for 603 receiving yards and nine receiving touchdowns.

Henry returned as the Patriots starting tight end in 2022. He finished the season with 41 catches for 509 yards and two touchdowns.

In Week 14 of the 2023 season, Henry had two receiving touchdowns in a 21–18 win over the Steelers. In the 2023 season, Henry finished with 42 receptions for 419 receiving yards and six receiving touchdowns.

On March 8, 2024, Henry signed a three-year contract extension with the Patriots. He had eight receptions for 109 yards in Week 2 against the Seahawks, a 23–20 overtime loss. Henry finished the 2024 season with 66 receptions for 674 yards and two touchdowns.

Henry had two receiving touchdowns in Week 3 of the 2025 season, a 21–14 loss to the Steelers. In Week 12, he had seven receptions for 115 yards and one touchdown in a 26–20 win over the Bengals. In the 2025 season, Henry had 60 receptions for 768 yards and seven touchdowns. On January 11, 2026, Henry scored his first playoff touchdown, the lone touchdown in a 16–3 win in the Wild Card round against the Los Angeles Chargers. The win was Henry's first playoff victory of his career where he was active for the game, as he was inactive for the Chargers’ 2018 Wild Card victory over the Baltimore Ravens with a torn ACL. In Super Bowl LX, he had three receptions for 31 yards in the 29–13 loss to the Seahawks.

On August 10, 2026, the Patriots signed Henry to a two-year extension worth up to $20 million with $14.5 million guaranteed.

== Career statistics ==
=== Regular season ===
Legend
	Led the league (for tight ends)
**Bold**	Career best

Year	Team	Games		Receiving					Fumbles	
Year	Team	GP	GS	Rec	Yds	Avg	Lng	TD	Fum	Lost
2016	SD	15	10	36	478	**13.3**	**59**	8	**1**	**1**
2017	LAC	14	13	45	579	12.9	34	4	0	0
2018	LAC	0	0	Did not play due to injury						
2019	LAC	12	12	55	652	11.9	30	5	**1**	**1**
2020	LAC	14	14	60	613	10.2	33	4	0	0
2021	NE	**17**	10	50	603	12.1	35	**9**	0	0
2022	NE	**17**	14	41	509	12.4	39	2	0	0
2023	NE	14	10	42	419	10.0	24	6	1	0
2024	NE	16	16	**66**	674	10.2	35	2	0	0
2025	NE	**17**	**17**	60	**768**	12.8	36	7	0	0
2026	NE	5	5	15	177	11.8	29	1	0	0
Career		141	121	470	5,472	11.6	59	48	3	2

=== Postseason ===
Legend
	Led the league (for tight ends)
**Bold**	Career best

Year	Team	Games		Receiving					Fumbles	
Year	Team	GP	GS	Rec	Yds	Avg	Lng	TD	Fum	Lost
2018	LAC	1	1	0	0	0.0	0	0	0	0
2021	NE	1	1	1	30	**30.0**	**30**	0	0	0
2025	NE	**4**	**4**	**9**	**112**	12.4	28	**1**	0	0
Career		6	6	10	142	14.2	30	1	0	0

=== College ===
Season	Team	Conf	GP	Receiving				
Season	Team	Conf	GP	Rec	Yds	Avg	Lng	TD
2013	Arkansas	SEC	10	28	409	14.6	66	4
2014	Arkansas	SEC	12	37	513	13.9	54	2
2015	Arkansas	SEC	13	51	739	14.5	79	3
Career			35	116	1,661	14.3	79	9

== Personal life ==
Henry has three siblings; Hayden, Hudson and Hope. Hayden was a linebacker at Arkansas from 2017–2022. Hudson was a tight end for the Razorbacks from 2019–2022.

Henry married his college sweetheart Parker Schmidly on June 30, 2018. The couple have one son and one daughter.

Henry is a Christian. He has said, "I would say my faith is the most important thing to me. My dad is a pastor in Little Rock. I’ve grown up in a Christian background my whole life. My faith is the most important thing to me; that’s the one message that I want to convey to everybody."

Henry is a supporter of Compassion International and International Justice Mission.
