= Keon Hatcher Sr. =

American gridiron football player (born 1994)

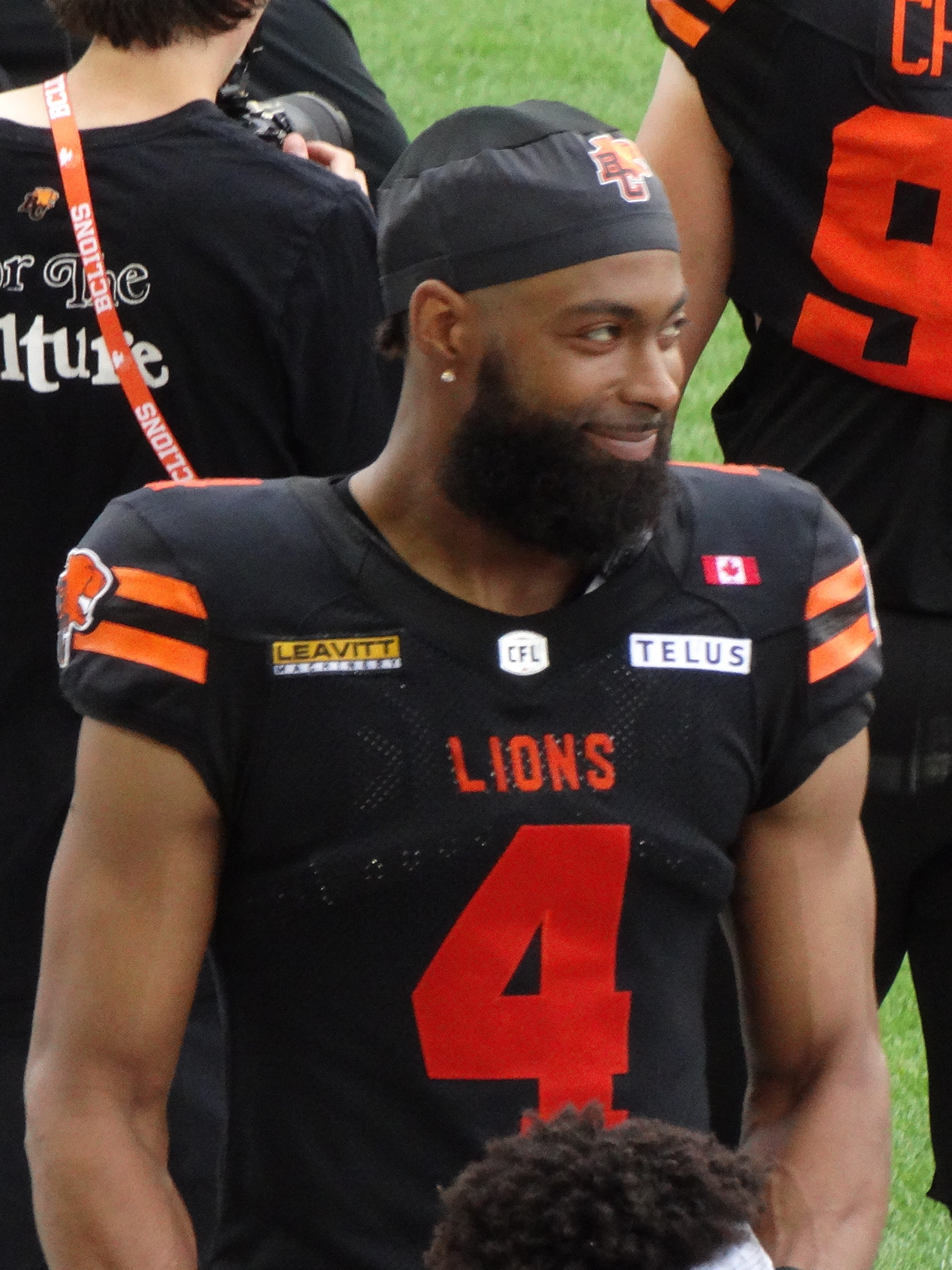
- Hatcher Sr. with the BC Lions in 2025

No. 4 – BC Lions
- Position: Wide receiver
- Roster status: Active
- CFL status: American

Personal information
- Born: September 11, 1994 (age 32); Tulsa, Oklahoma, U.S.
- Listed height: 6 ft 1 in (1.85 m)
- Listed weight: 212 lb (96 kg)

Career information
- High school: Owasso (Owasso, Oklahoma)
- College: Arkansas
- NFL draft: 2017: undrafted

Career history
- Oakland Raiders (2017–2018); Detroit Lions (2018)*; Green Bay Packers (2018)*; Oakland Raiders (2018); Green Bay Packers (2019)*; New York Jets (2019–2020)*; BC Lions (2021–present)
- * Offseason or practice squad member only

Awards and highlights
- 2× CFL All-Star (2023, 2025); 3x CFL West All-Star (2023, 2025),2026}

Career NFL statistics
- Receptions: 1
- Receiving yards: 8
- Receiving touchdowns: 0
- Stats at Pro Football Reference

Career CFL statistics as of 2026
- Targets: 584
- Receptions: 379
- Receiving yards: 5,926
- Receiving touchdowns: 30
- Stats at CFL.ca

Keon Hatcher Sr. (born September 11, 1994) is an American professional football wide receiver for the BC Lions of the Canadian Football League (CFL). He first played football at Owasso High School in Oklahoma. He then played college football at Arkansas and signed with the Oakland Raiders as an undrafted free agent in 2017.

== Professional career ==
Pre-draft measurables
Height	Weight	Arm length	Hand span	Wingspan	40-yard dash	10-yard split	20-yard split	Bench press
6 ft 1 1/4 in (1.86 m)	212 lb (96 kg)	32 in (0.81 m)	9 1/2 in (0.24 m)	6 ft 4 1/8 in (1.93 m)	4.64 s	1.61 s	2.72 s	16 reps
All values from NFL Combine

=== Oakland Raiders (first stint) ===
Hatcher Sr. signed with the Oakland Raiders as an undrafted free agent on May 5, 2017. He was waived on September 2, 2017, and was signed to the Raiders' practice squad the next day. He signed a reserve/future contract with the Raiders on January 2, 2018.

After an impressive preseason, Hatcher Sr. made the Raiders' initial 53-man roster and made his regular-season debut in Week 1 in a 33–13 loss to the Los Angeles Rams. On September 12, 2018, he was waived by the Raiders.

=== Detroit Lions ===
On September 19, 2018, Hatcher Sr. was signed to the Detroit Lions' practice squad, but was released the following day.

=== Green Bay Packers (first stint) ===
Hatcher Sr. was signed to the Green Bay Packers practice squad on October 9, 2018.

=== Oakland Raiders (second stint) ===
On November 19, 2018, Hatcher Sr. was signed by the Raiders off the Packers practice squad. He was waived on August 31, 2019.

=== Green Bay Packers (second stint) ===
On September 19, 2019, Hatcher Sr. was signed to the Packers practice squad. He was released on October 31.

=== New York Jets ===
On December 17, 2019, Hatcher Sr. was signed to the New York Jets practice squad. He signed a reserve/future contract with the Jets on December 30, 2019. He was waived on May 5, 2020.

Hatcher Sr. had a tryout with the Detroit Lions on August 14, 2020.

=== BC Lions ===
Hatcher Sr. signed with the BC Lions of the CFL on June 9, 2021. During the 2021 season, Hatcher Sr. spent most of the season on the practice roster but dressed for seven games. After training camp in 2022, Hatcher Sr. made the active roster and was a starter as the field wide receiver for the Lions. Hatcher Sr. had a breakout season in 2022, where he was second on the team in receiving yards with 1,043, and third in catches with 70 receptions. Five of his receptions were for touchdowns. On December 3, 2025, Hatcher Sr. re-signed with the Lions, on a two-year contract extension.

On October 22, 2026, Hatcher Sr. was placed on the Lions' reserve roster. He rejoined the active roster on October 30, 2026, ahead of the Western Semi-Final.
