= Drew Morgan =

American football player (born 1994)

No. 80, 81
- Position: Wide receiver

Personal information
- Born: December 2, 1994 (age 31)
- Listed height: 6 ft 0 in (1.83 m)
- Listed weight: 190 lb (86 kg)

Career information
- High school: Greenwood (AR)
- College: Arkansas
- NFL draft: 2017: undrafted

Career history

Playing
- Miami Dolphins (2017–2018)*; Memphis Express (2019)
- * Offseason or practice squad member only

Coaching
- Greenwood HS (2018); Fayetteville HS (2019); Warner, OK (2020)

Awards and highlights
- Second-team All-SEC (2015)
- Stats at Pro Football Reference

Drew Morgan (born December 2, 1994) is an American former football wide receiver. He played college football at Arkansas.

== Early life ==
Morgan attended Greenwood High School in Greenwood, Arkansas. He was ranked as the No. 7 player in Arkansas by Rivals and as the No. 13 prospect in the state by 247Sports, he walked on at Arkansas in 2012.

== College career ==
In his freshman year Morgan played in 10 games at WR and on Special teams. In his junior year he led the team in catches (63), yards (843) and TD catches (10) and received an All-SEC Second-team honours.

== Professional career ==
Morgan signed with the Miami Dolphins as an undrafted free agent on May 5, 2017. He was waived on September 2, 2017 and was signed to the Dolphins' practice squad the next day. He signed a reserve/future contract with the Dolphins on January 1, 2018.

On September 1, 2018, Morgan was waived by the Dolphins, and then immediately joined the coaching staff of his alma mater Greenwood High School as a volunteer coach.

In 2019, Morgan joined the Memphis Express of the Alliance of American Football, but did not make the final roster. He was re-signed to a contract on March 25, 2019, while on the team's rights list. He was activated to the roster on March 26. The league ceased operations in April 2019.

Morgan retired on June 17, 2019.

== Coaching career ==
Morgan became a volunteer assistant coach at Fayetteville High School in 2019, and then became the offensive coordinator at Warner High School in Oklahoma for the 2020 season. In 2021, he moved to Elkins High School in Arkansas as special teams coordinator.
