= Brandon Allen (American football) =

American football player (born 1992)

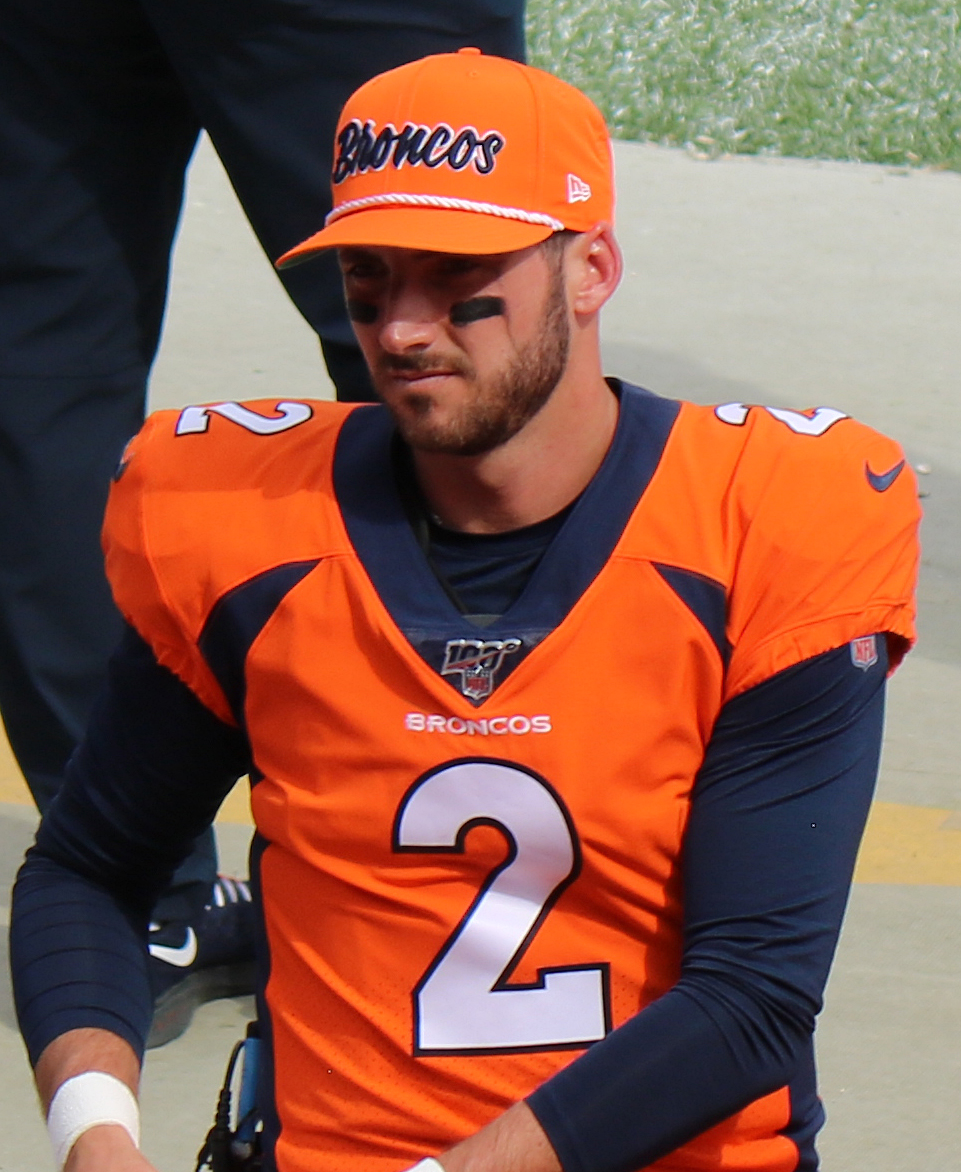
- Allen with the Denver Broncos in 2019

Profile
- Position: Quarterback

Personal information
- Born: September 5, 1992 (age 34); Fayetteville, Arkansas, U.S.
- Listed height: 6 ft 2 in (1.88 m)
- Listed weight: 219 lb (99 kg)

Career information
- High school: Fayetteville
- College: Arkansas (2011–2015)
- NFL draft: 2016: 6th round, 201st overall pick

Career history
- Jacksonville Jaguars (2016); Los Angeles Rams (2017–2018); Denver Broncos (2019); Cincinnati Bengals (2020–2022); San Francisco 49ers (2023–2024); Tennessee Titans (2025); New York Giants (2026)*
- * Offseason or practice squad member only

Career NFL statistics as of 2025
- Passing attempts: 323
- Passing completions: 183
- Completion percentage: 56.7%
- TD–INT: 11–9
- Passing yards: 1,882
- Passer rating: 73.3
- Stats at Pro Football Reference

Brandon Duc Allen (born September 5, 1992) is an American professional football quarterback. He played college football for the Arkansas Razorbacks and was selected by the Jacksonville Jaguars in the sixth round of the 2016 NFL draft. Allen has also been a member of the Los Angeles Rams, Denver Broncos, Cincinnati Bengals, San Francisco 49ers, and Tennessee Titans.

== Early life ==
Allen attended Fayetteville High School in Fayetteville, Arkansas. As a senior, he threw for 3,408 yards and 38 touchdowns. He was ranked by Rivals.com as the fifth-best pro-style quarterback recruit.

== College career ==
Allen was redshirted as a freshman in 2011. In 2012, he was the backup to Tyler Wilson. He appeared in five games and started one game after Wilson missed a game because of injury. He finished the season completing 21 of 49 passes for 186 yards with one touchdown and three interceptions.

In 2013, Allen took over as the starting quarterback. He passed for 1,552 yards, completing 49.6 percent of his throws, and threw for 13 touchdowns and 10 interceptions for a team that finished 3–9 under first year head coach Bret Bielema.

As a junior in 2014, Allen had 2,285 passing yards, 20 touchdowns and five interceptions. He was the offensive MVP of the 2014 Texas Bowl, a 31–7 victory against the Texas Longhorns. Allen threw two touchdowns in the game, and Arkansas finished with a 7–6 record.

During his senior year in 2015, Allen threw a then-school record six touchdown passes, and ran in the game winning 2 point conversion in a 53–52 overtime win over Ole Miss. He broke the record two weeks later with seven touchdowns in a 51–50 loss to Mississippi State. He also broke Arkansas' record for career passing touchdowns against Mississippi State. He finished the year with 3,440 passing yards, 30 touchdowns, and eight interceptions for a team that finished 8–5, and beat Kansas State in the 2016 Liberty Bowl, 45–23.

Allen finished his career with 7,463 passing yards, 64 passing touchdowns, and 26 interceptions. Allen majored in recreation and sport management.

== Professional career ==
Pre-draft measurables
Height	Weight	Arm length	Hand span	Wingspan	40-yard dash	10-yard split	20-yard split	20-yard shuttle	Three-cone drill	Vertical jump	Broad jump
6 ft 1 3/8 in (1.86 m)	217 lb (98 kg)	31 1/4 in (0.79 m)	8 7/8 in (0.23 m)	6 ft 2 7/8 in (1.90 m)	4.84 s	1.66 s	2.82 s	4.33 s	7.06 s	28.0 in (0.71 m)	9 ft 2 in (2.79 m)
All values from the NFL Combine

=== Jacksonville Jaguars ===
Allen was selected by the Jacksonville Jaguars in the sixth round with the 201st overall pick in the 2016 NFL draft. On May 5, 2016, Allen signed a four-year $2.48 million contract, which included a $147,687 signing bonus. Allen was the Jaguars' third-string quarterback his rookie season behind Blake Bortles and Chad Henne.

Allen was waived by the Jaguars on September 3, 2017, following final roster cuts for the 2017 season.

=== Los Angeles Rams ===
On September 4, 2017, Allen was claimed off waivers by the Los Angeles Rams. He was inactive for every game of the season as the Rams' third-string quarterback behind Jared Goff and Sean Mannion. Allen was placed on injured reserve on December 20.

On September 18, 2018, Allen was waived by the Rams and was re-signed to the practice squad the next day.

Allen signed a reserve/future contract with the Rams on February 7, 2019. On August 30, Allen was released as part of final roster cuts.

=== Denver Broncos ===
On September 1, 2019, Allen was claimed off waivers by the Denver Broncos. After an injury to starting quarterback Joe Flacco in Week 8 of the 2019 season, Allen stepped in as the starting quarterback. Allen made his first start in Week 9 against the Cleveland Browns. In the game, Allen threw for 193 yards and two touchdowns in the 24–19 victory.

=== Cincinnati Bengals ===
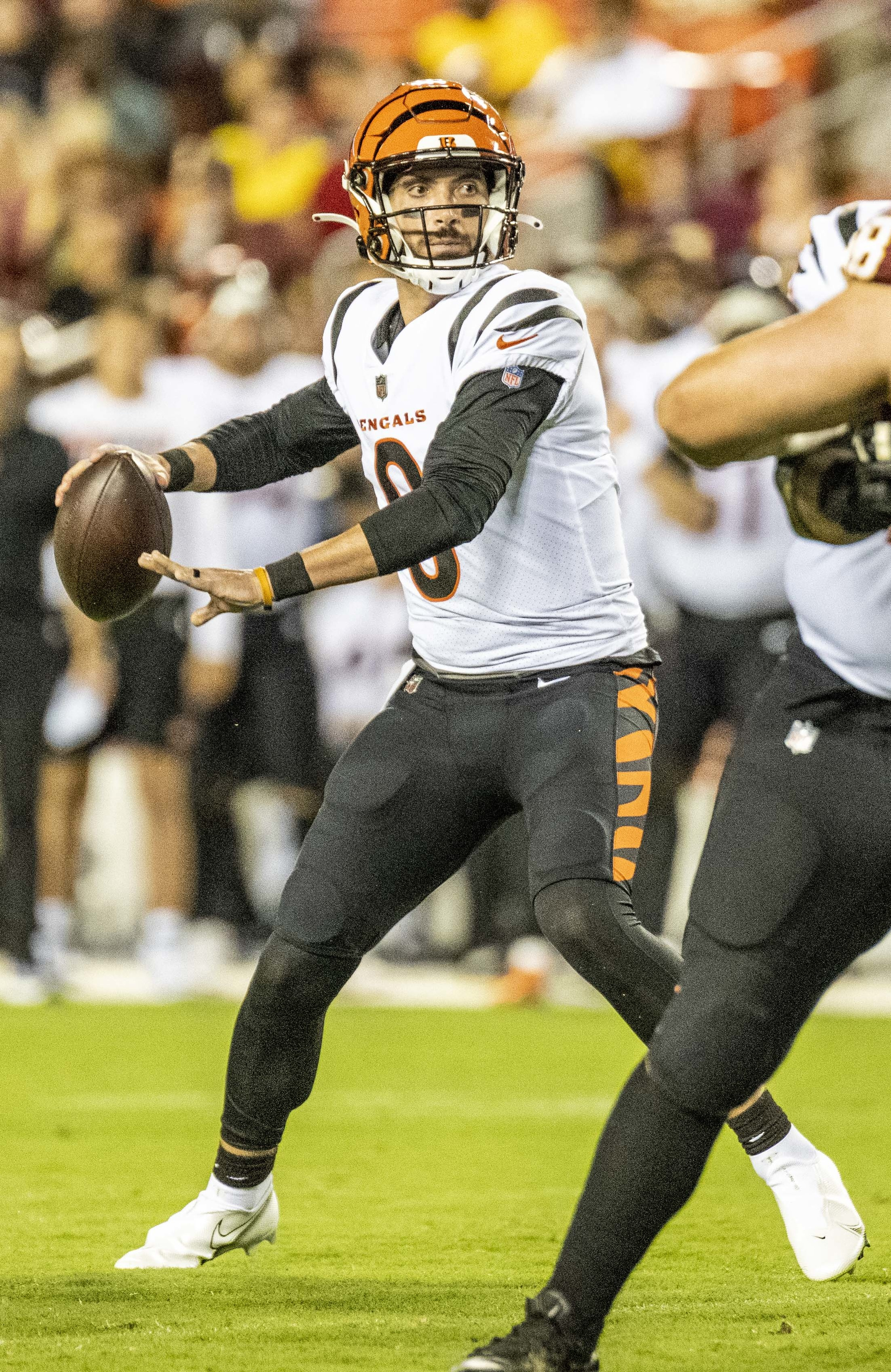
Allen in 2021

On August 1, 2020, Allen was signed by the Cincinnati Bengals. He was released on September 5, but was signed to the practice squad the next day. Allen was promoted to the active roster on November 23 after starting quarterback Joe Burrow suffered a season-ending injury. Two days later, the team announced that Allen would start for the Bengals during their Week 12 game against the New York Giants in place of the injured Joe Burrow. During Week 16 against the Houston Texans, he had 371 passing yards and two touchdowns in the 37–31 road victory. Allen started the final game for the season against the Baltimore Ravens, where he completed six of 21 passes for 48 yards, two interceptions, and a passer rating of 0.0 as the Bengals lost 38–3.

On March 10, 2021, Allen signed a one-year contract extension with the Bengals.

Allen played his first game of the 2021 season against the Detroit Lions in Week 6. Allen threw a touchdown pass to Auden Tate on his only pass attempt of the game, while taking 3 kneel downs at the end of the game. Allen would appear in the Bengals' next game against the Ravens, recording no stats in the 41–17 victory. In Week 9, with the game out of reach for the Bengals, Allen would go 1 for 2 for 6 yards passing, while rushing once in the 41–16 loss to the Browns. In Week 12, Allen would once again see playing time, this time against the Pittsburgh Steelers. Allen threw an incomplete pass on his only passing attempt, and lost a yard on his only rush attempt of the game. Allen started the season finale against the Browns where he threw for 136 yards and a touchdown in the 21–16 loss.

Allen re-signed with the Bengals on a one-year contract on March 18, 2022. On August 31, the Bengals cut Allen. He re-signed with the Bengals the following day. Allen was subbed in at the end of the Week 9 game against the Carolina Panthers due to the Bengals resting their starters for the majority of the fourth quarter. Allen completed all three of his pass attempts for a total of 22 yards.

=== San Francisco 49ers ===
On May 8, 2023, Allen was signed by the San Francisco 49ers. He served as the team's third-string quarterback behind Brock Purdy and Sam Darnold in 2023.

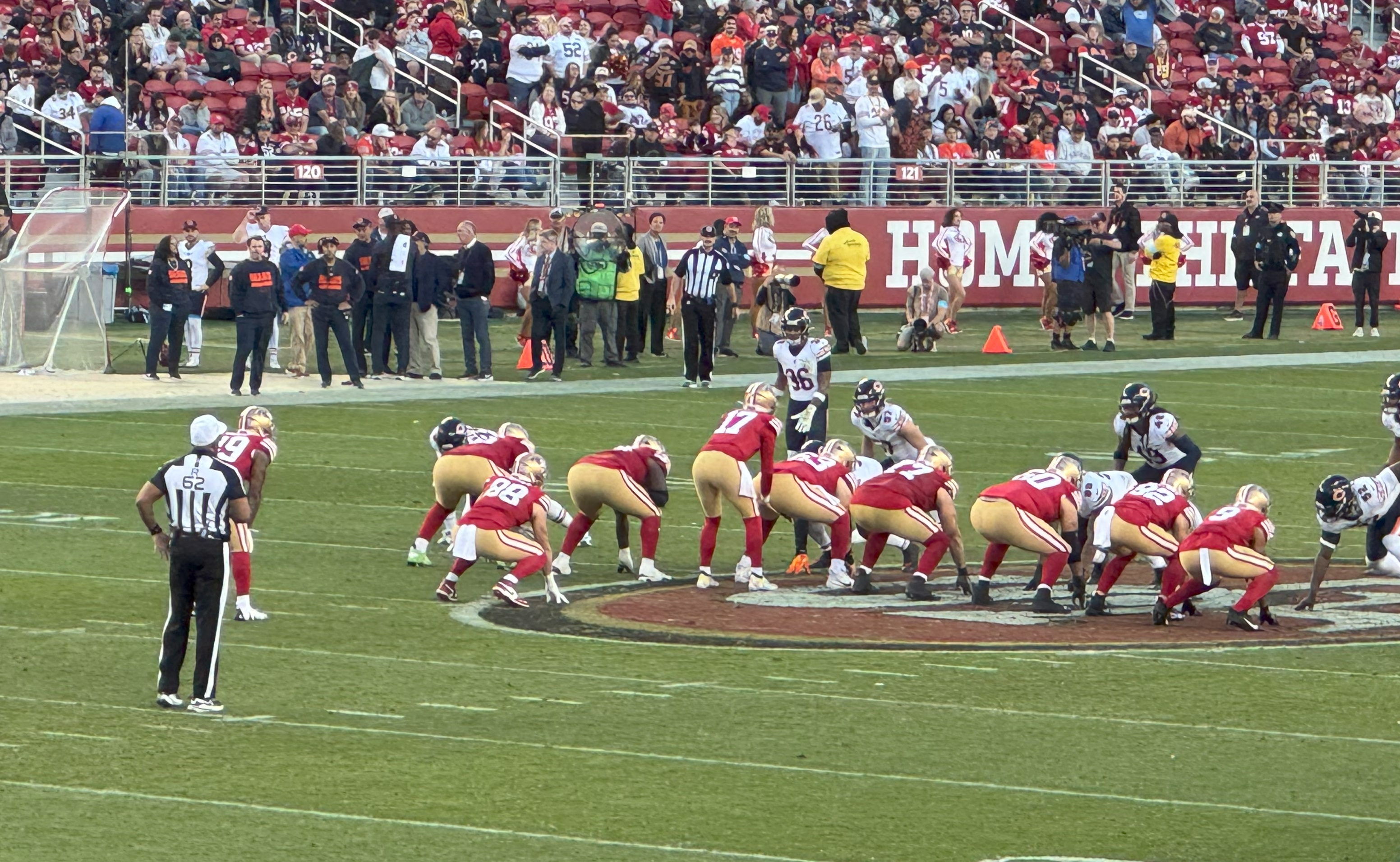
Allen leading the 49ers' offense against the Chicago Bears in 2024

On March 13, 2024, Allen re-signed with the 49ers. He began the season as the second-string quarterback behind Brock Purdy after beating out Joshua Dobbs during training camp. After Purdy was ruled out with an injury, Allen was named the starter for the 49ers' Week 12 matchup against the Green Bay Packers, marking Allen's first start since the 2021 season. Against the Packers, Allen threw for 199 yards, a touchdown, an interception, and lost a fumble in a 38–10 loss. Allen also entered the Week 14 game against the Chicago Bears on two occasions, initially after Purdy exited the game with a suspected injury and again when victory for the 49ers was assured; he threw an interception during the latter stint.

=== Tennessee Titans ===
On March 14, 2025, Allen signed with the Tennessee Titans on a one-year, $1.42 million contract, reuniting with head coach Brian Callahan from his tenure as offensive coordinator for the Bengals.

=== New York Giants ===
On April 13, 2026, Allen signed a one-year, $1.45 million contract with the New York Giants. He was released by the Giants on August 30.

== Career statistics ==
=== NFL ===
Year	Team	Games			Passing								Rushing				Sacks		Fumbles	
Year	Team	GP	GS	Record	Cmp	Att	Pct	Yds	Avg	TD	Int	Rtg	Att	Yds	Avg	TD	Sck	SckY	Fum	Lost
2016	JAX	0	0	—	DNP															
2017	LAR	0	0	—	DNP															
2018	LAR	0	0	—	DNP															
2019	DEN	3	3	1–2	39	84	46.4	515	6.1	3	2	68.3	10	39	3.9	0	9	59	0	0
2020	CIN	5	5	1–4	90	142	63.4	925	6.5	5	4	82.0	13	27	2.1	0	7	51	1	1
2021	CIN	6	1	0–1	17	34	50.0	149	4.4	2	0	81.6	7	−1	−0.1	0	4	33	1	0
2022	CIN	1	0	—	3	3	100.0	22	7.3	0	0	97.2	3	−1	−0.3	0	1	0	0	0
2023	SF	0	0	—	DNP															
2024	SF	3	1	0–1	17	30	56.7	199	6.6	1	2	60.3	3	4	1.3	0	2	2	2	1
2025	TEN	1	0	—	17	30	56.7	72	2.4	0	1	47.9	0	0	—	0	1	7	0	0
Career		19	10	2–8	183	323	56.7	1,882	5.8	11	9	73.3	36	68	1.9	0	24	152	4	2

=== College ===
Season	Team	Games			Passing								Rushing			
Season	Team	GP	GS	Record	Comp	Att	Pct	Yards	Avg	TD	Int	Rate	Att	Yards	Avg	TD
2011	Arkansas	Redshirt (redshirt)														
2012	Arkansas	5	1	0–1	21	49	42.9	186	3.8	1	3	69.2	8	−3	−0.4	0
2013	Arkansas	11	11	3–8	128	258	49.6	1,552	6.0	13	10	109.0	29	29	1.0	1
2014	Arkansas	13	13	7–6	190	339	56.0	2,285	6.7	20	5	129.2	42	0	0.0	2
2015	Arkansas	13	13	8–5	244	370	65.9	3,440	9.3	30	8	166.5	55	110	2.0	1
Career		42	38	18–20	583	1,016	57.4	7,463	7.3	64	26	134.8	134	136	1.0	4

== Personal life ==
Allen's father, Bobby, is the Razorbacks' director of high school and NFL relations. His younger brother, Austin, became the starting quarterback for the Razorbacks after Brandon completed his college eligibility. Austin signed with the Tampa Bay Buccaneers as an undrafted free agent following the 2018 NFL draft.
