= 2016 Liberty Bowl (January) =

2016 AutoZone Liberty Bowl
- 57th Liberty Bowl
Kansas State Wildcats	Arkansas Razorbacks
(6–6)	(7–5)
Big 12	SEC
23	45
Head coach: Bill Snyder	Head coach: Bret Bielema
	1	2	3	4	Total
Kansas State	10	3	10	0	23
Arkansas	14	10	7	14	45
- Date: January 2, 2016
- Season: 2015
- Stadium: Liberty Bowl Memorial Stadium
- Location: Memphis, Tennessee
- MVP: Alex Collins (RB, Arkansas)
- Favorite: Arkansas by 11½
- National anthem: Betty Cantrell
- Referee: Ron Snodgrass (Big Ten)
- Halftime show: Craig Morgan
- Attendance: 61,136
- Payout: US$TBD

United States TV coverage
- Network: ESPN/ESPN Radio
- Announcers: Anish Shroff, Ahmad Brooks, & Dawn Davenport (ESPN); Mark Neely, Jay Walker, & Kevin Weidl (ESPN Radio)

The 2016 Liberty Bowl was a post-season American college football bowl game played on January 2, 2016, at Liberty Bowl Memorial Stadium in Memphis, Tennessee. The 57th edition of the Liberty Bowl featured the Kansas State Wildcats of the Big 12 Conference against the Arkansas Razorbacks of the Southeastern Conference. It began at 2:20 p.m. CST and aired on ESPN. It was one of the 2015–16 bowl games that concluded the 2015 FBS football season. Sponsored by automobile parts and accessories store AutoZone, it was officially known as the AutoZone Liberty Bowl.

== Teams ==
The game featured the Kansas State Wildcats against the Arkansas Razorbacks.

=== Kansas State Wildcats ===
After finishing their season 6–6, the Wildcats accepted their invitation to play in the game.

This was the Wildcats' first Liberty Bowl.

=== Arkansas Razorbacks ===
After finishing their season 7–5, the Razorbacks accepted their invitation to play in the game.

This was the Razorbacks' fifth Liberty Bowl, giving them the new record for most appearances in the game. The Razorbacks are now 2–3 all-time in the Liberty Bowl, losing the 1971 Liberty Bowl to Tennessee 14–13, then losing the 1984 Liberty Bowl to Auburn 21–15, losing the 1987 Liberty Bowl to Georgia 20–17, and finally winning the 2010 Liberty Bowl over East Carolina 20–17 in overtime.

== Game summary ==
=== Scoring summary ===
Scoring summary

Quarter	Time	Drive			Team	Scoring information	Score	
Quarter	Time	Plays	Yards	TOP	Team	Scoring information	K-ST	ARK
1	11:38	4	27	1:52	K-ST	Winston Dimel 10-yard touchdown run, Matthew McCrane kick good	7	0
1	8:15	6	72	3:23	ARK	Alex Collins 22-yard touchdown run, Cole Hedlund kick good	7	7
1	3:50	8	46	4:18	K-ST	36-yard field goal by Matthew McCrane	10	7
1	2:22	3	24	1:17	ARK	Jared Cornelius 13-yard touchdown run, Cole Hedlund kick good	10	14
2	13:05	8	64	3:04	ARK	Alex Collins 13-yard touchdown run, Cole Hedlund kick good	10	21
2	2:08	9	55	4:59	ARK	26-yard field goal by Cole Hedlund	10	24
2	0:21	8	49	1:41	K-ST	21-yard field goal by Matthew McCrane	13	24
3	12:44	4	74	2:10	K-ST	Winston Dimel 48-yard touchdown reception from Kody Cook, Matthew McCrane kick good	20	24
3	7:54	9	82	4:42	ARK	Jeremy Sprinkel 6-yard touchdown reception from Brandon Allen, Cole Hedlund kick good	20	31
3	1:46	11	47	6:02	K-ST	32-yard field goal by Matthew McCrane	23	31
4	12:04	8	78	4:34	ARK	Alex Collins 14-yard touchdown run, Cole Hedlund kick good	23	38
4	4:46	9	80	5:38	ARK	Kody Walker 10-yard touchdown run, Cole Hedlund kick good	23	45
"TOP" = time of possession. For other American football terms, see Glossary of American football.							23	45

=== Statistics ===
Statistics	K-ST	ARK
First downs	13	30
Total offense, plays - yards	47–242	68–569
Rushes-yards (net)	22–79	42–254
Passing yards (net)	163	315
Passes, Comp-Att-Int	12–25–1	20–26–1
Time of Possession	22:30	37:30

Arkansas running back Alex Collins was named the game's MVP, after gaining 185 yards and 3 touchdowns on 23 carries.
