= Jonathan Williams (running back, born 1994) =

American football player (born 1994)

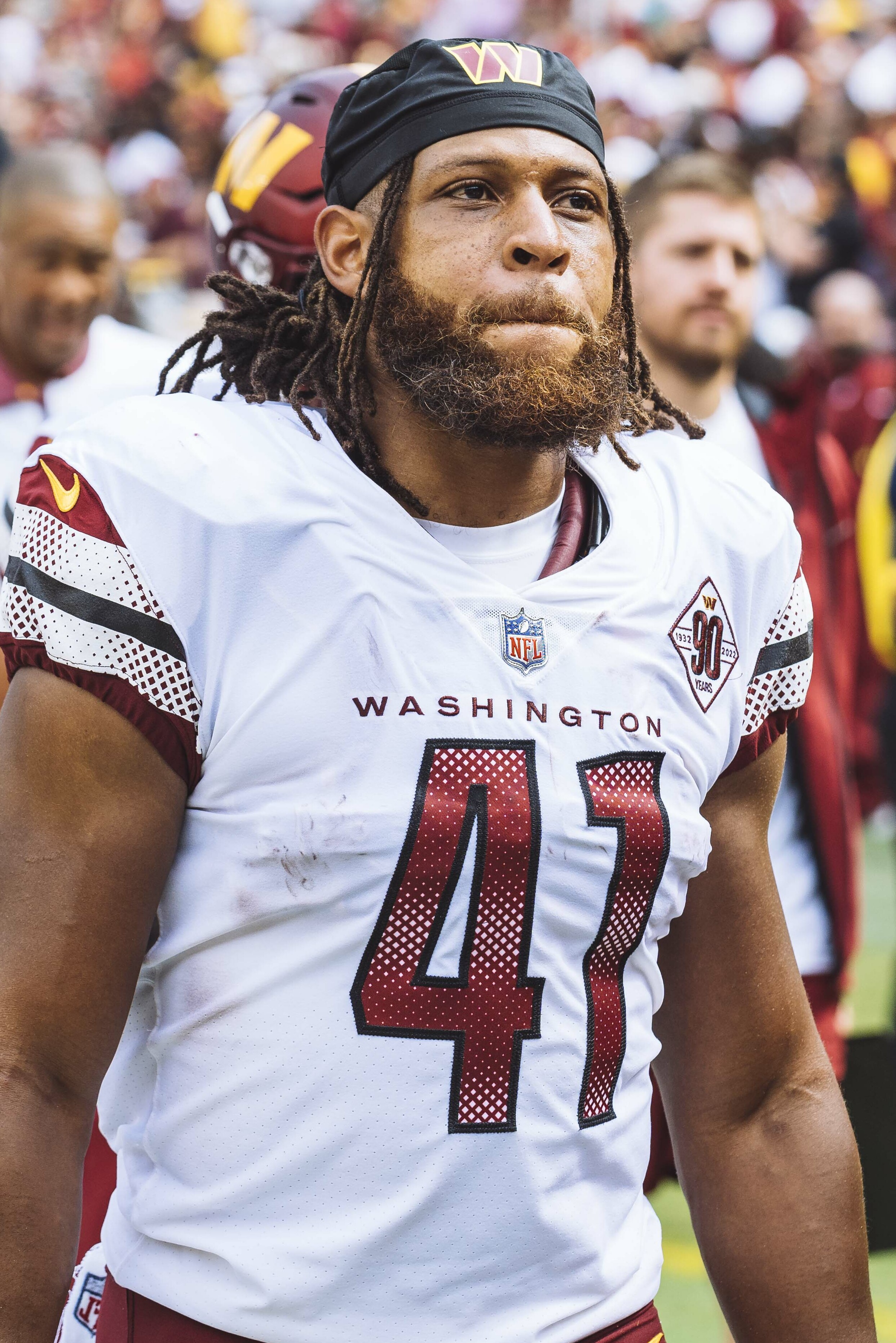
- Williams with the Washington Commanders in 2022

No. 18, 31, 32, 33, 35, 41
- Position: Running back

Personal information
- Born: February 2, 1994 (age 32); Dallas, Texas, U.S.
- Listed height: 6 ft 0 in (1.83 m)
- Listed weight: 217 lb (98 kg)

Career information
- High school: Allen (Allen, Texas)
- College: Arkansas (2012–2015)
- NFL draft: 2016: 5th round, 156th overall pick

Career history
- Buffalo Bills (2016); Denver Broncos (2017)*; New Orleans Saints (2017–2018); Indianapolis Colts (2018–2019); Detroit Lions (2020); Washington Football Team (2020)*; Detroit Lions (2020); Washington Football Team (2020–2021)*; New York Giants (2021)*; Washington Football Team / Commanders (2021–2023)
- * Offseason or practice squad member only

Awards and highlights
- Second-team All-SEC (2014)

Career NFL statistics
- Rushing yards: 563
- Rushing average: 4.2
- Rushing touchdowns: 3
- Receptions: 22
- Receiving yards: 149
- Stats at Pro Football Reference

Jonathan Williams (born February 2, 1994) is an American former professional football player who was a running back in the National Football League (NFL). He played college football for the Arkansas Razorbacks and was selected by the Buffalo Bills in the fifth round of the 2016 NFL draft. Williams was also a member of the Denver Broncos, New Orleans Saints, Indianapolis Colts, Detroit Lions, Washington Football Team / Commanders and New York Giants.

== Early life ==
A native of Allen, Texas, he attended Allen High School, where he collected more than 3,500 rushing yards in his career and scored 39 total touchdowns.

Considered a four-star recruit by Rivals.com, he was rated as the 17th best running back prospect of his class, and drew comparisons to former Atlanta Falcons running back Michael Turner. On November 16, 2011, he committed to play college football for the Arkansas Razorbacks, after he had previously been committed to Missouri.

== College career ==
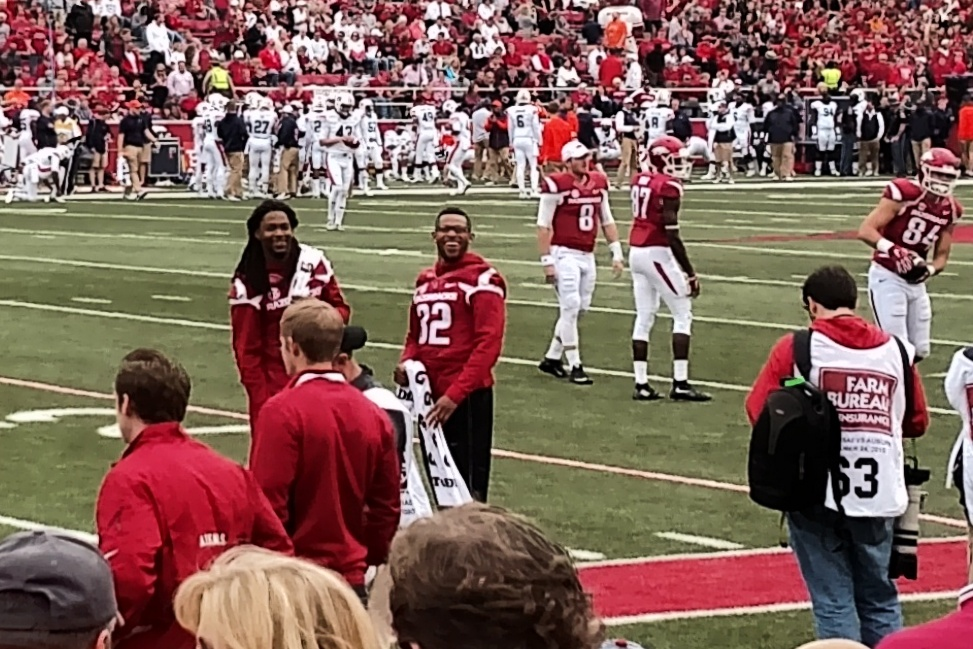
Williams (32) looks towards family in the stands

As a true freshman in 2012, he played in 11 games, and made two starts. He recorded 45 rushes for 231 yards and eight receptions for 208 yards and two touchdowns. He scored his first career touchdown on a 74-yard pass, his first reception of his career, on the first offensive play of the game against Kentucky. As a sophomore in 2013, he played in all 12 games, making 11 starts. He recorded 150 carries for 900 yards, scoring four touchdowns while adding seven receptions for 72 yards and two touchdowns. Teaming with true freshman Alex Collins, they produced Arkansas' second pair of teammates to each rush for at least 900 yards in the same season. Darren McFadden and Felix Jones were the only previous tandem to do so, achieving the accomplishment in the 2006 and 2007 seasons. In 2014, despite splitting carries with Collins, he rushed for 1,190 yards on 211 carries (5.6 avg) and 12 touchdowns.

On December 24, 2014, Williams announced on YouTube in a message to Razorback fans that he would be returning for his senior season at Arkansas. During summer camp leading into the 2015 season, Williams suffered a foot injury that would force him to miss the entire upcoming regular season.

== Professional career ==
Pre-draft measurables
| Height | Weight | Arm length | Hand span | 40-yard dash | 10-yard split | 20-yard split | 20-yard shuttle | Three-cone drill | Bench press |
|---|---|---|---|---|---|---|---|---|---|
| 5 ft 10 3/4 in (1.80 m) | 220 lb (100 kg) | 31 5/8 in (0.80 m) | 10 in (0.25 m) | 4.63 s | 1.57 s | 2.65 s | 4.29 s | 6.97 s | 16 reps |
All values from NFL Combine/Pro Day

=== Buffalo Bills ===
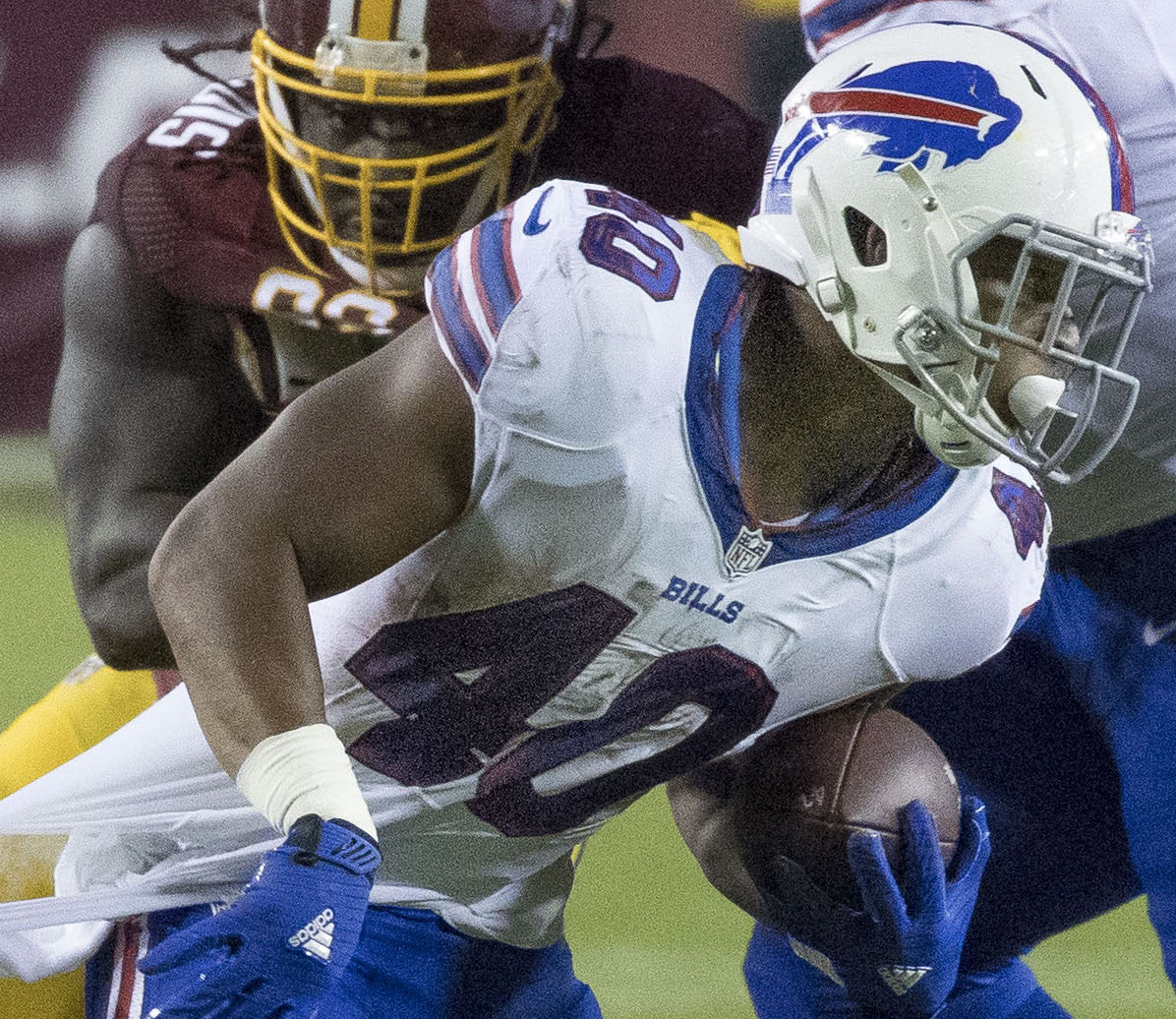
Williams with the Buffalo Bills in 2016

The Buffalo Bills selected Williams in the fifth round (156th overall) of the 2016 NFL draft. On May 13, 2016, he signed a four-year contract with the Bills.

On September 3, 2017, Williams was released by the Bills.

=== Denver Broncos ===
On September 5, 2017, Williams was signed to the practice squad of the Denver Broncos.

=== New Orleans Saints ===
On November 14, 2017, Williams was signed to a two-year contract by the New Orleans Saints off of the Broncos' practice squad.

On September 1, 2018, Williams was waived by the Saints and was re–signed to the practice squad the following day. He was promoted to the active roster on September 8. Williams was waived by New Orleans on September 28.

=== Indianapolis Colts ===
On October 2, 2018, Williams was signed to the Indianapolis Colts' practice squad. He was promoted to the active roster on November 20.

In Week 11 of the 2019 season against the Jacksonville Jaguars, Williams rushed 13 times for 116 yards in the 33–13 win. The following week, Williams ran for 104 yards and a score against the Houston Texans on Thursday Night Football. Williams appeared in nine games and recorded 49 carries for 235 rushing yards and one rushing touchdown on the 2019 season.

=== Detroit Lions ===
Williams was signed by the Detroit Lions on August 17, 2020. He was released by Detroit on September 5, and was re–signed to the practice squad the following day. Williams was elevated to the active roster on September 12 for the team's Week 1 game against the Chicago Bears and reverted to the practice squad on September 14. He was released by the Lions on September 22.

=== Washington Football Team ===
On October 7, 2020, Williams was signed to the Washington Football Team's practice squad.

=== Detroit Lions (second stint) ===
Williams was signed off Washington's practice squad by the Detroit Lions on October 30, 2020. He fumbled on his only carry as a Lion. Williams was waived by Detroit on December 24.

=== Washington Football Team (second stint) ===
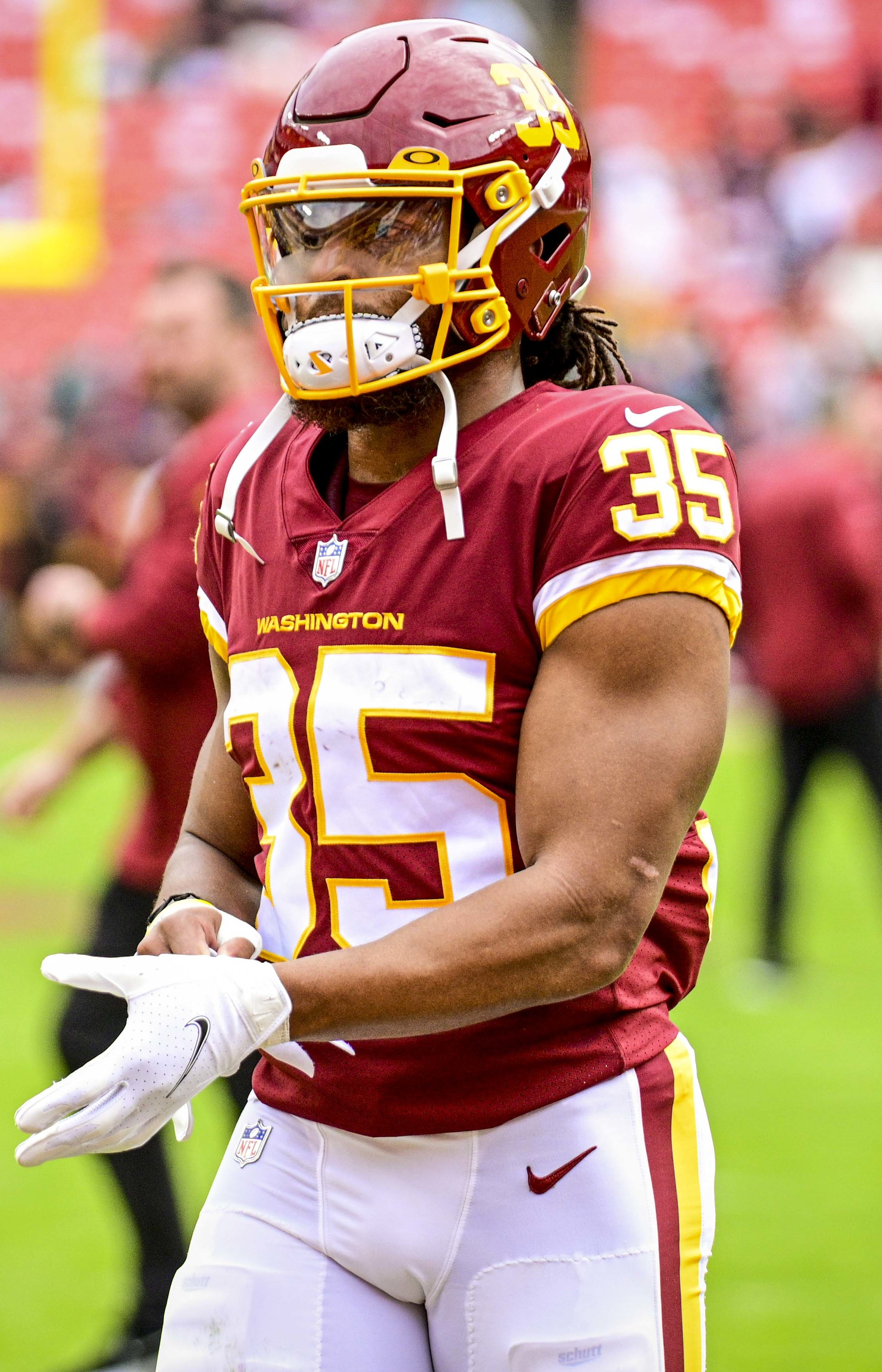
Williams with the Washington Football Team in 2022

Williams re-signed to Washington's practice squad on December 31, 2020. On January 11, 2021, Williams signed a reserve/futures contract with Washington. He was released by the Commanders on August 31, but was re-signed to their practice squad on September 6. Williams was released by Washington again on November 2.

=== New York Giants ===
On November 17, 2021, Williams was signed to the New York Giants' practice squad.

=== Washington Football Team / Commanders (third stint) ===
On December 8, 2021, Williams was signed off the Giants' practice squad by the Washington Football Team. He scored a rushing touchdown in a Week 14 game against the Dallas Cowboys. Williams re-signed with Washington on January 11, 2022.

Williams re-signed on another one-year contract on February 24, 2023. He was placed on injured reserve on August 29, and was released with an injury settlement two days later. On November 7, the Commanders re–signed Williams to their practice squad. His contract expired when the team's season ended January 7, 2024.
