= 2008 Arkansas Razorbacks football team =

American college football season

2008 Arkansas Razorbacks football
- Conference: Southeastern Conference
- Western Division
- Record: 5–7 (2–6 SEC)
- Head coach: Bobby Petrino (1st season)
- Offensive coordinator: Paul Petrino (1st season)
- Offensive scheme: Multiple
- Defensive coordinator: Willy Robinson (1st season)
- Base defense: 4–3
- Captains: Casey Dick; Jonathan Luigs; Jamar Love; Malcolm Sheppard
- Home stadium: Donald W. Reynolds Razorback Stadium; War Memorial Stadium

2008 Southeastern Conference football standings
	Conf.			Overall
Team	W		L	W		L
Eastern Division
No. 1 Florida x$#	7	–	1	13	–	1
No. 13 Georgia	6	–	2	10	–	3
Vanderbilt	4	–	4	7	–	6
South Carolina	4	–	4	7	–	6
Tennessee	3	–	5	5	–	7
Kentucky	2	–	6	7	–	6
Western Division
No. 6 Alabama x%	8	–	0	12	–	2
No. 14 Ole Miss	5	–	3	9	–	4
LSU	3	–	5	8	–	5
Arkansas	2	–	6	5	–	7
Auburn	2	–	6	5	–	7
Mississippi State	2	–	6	4	–	8
Championship: Florida 31, Alabama 20
# – BCS National Champion; $ – BCS representative as conference champion; % – BCS at-large representative; x – Division champion/co-champions; Rankings from AP Poll

The 2008 Arkansas Razorbacks football team represented the University of Arkansas as a member of the Southeastern Conference (SEC) during the 2008 NCAA Division I FBS football season. Led by first-year head coach Bobby Petrino, the Razorbacks compiled an overall record of 5–7 with a mark of 2–6 in conference play, placing a three-way tie for fourth at the bottom of the standings in the SEC's Western Division. The team played five home games at Donald W. Reynolds Razorback Stadium in Fayetteville, Arkansas and two home games at War Memorial Stadium in Little Rock, Arkansas.^{[a]}

== Schedule ==
Date	Time	Opponent	Site	TV	Result	Attendance
August 30	6:00 pm	No. 25 (FCS) Western Illinois*	Donald W. Reynolds Razorback Stadium; Fayetteville, AR		W 28–24	70,537
September 6	6:00 pm	Louisiana–Monroe*	War Memorial Stadium; Little Rock, AR^{[b]}	PPV	W 28–27	55,048
September 20	11:30 am	No. 9 Alabama	Donald W. Reynolds Razorback Stadium; Fayetteville, AR	Raycom	L 14–49	72,315
September 27	2:30 pm	at No. 7 Texas*	Darrell K Royal–Texas Memorial Stadium; Austin, TX (rivalry)	ABC	L 10–52	97,833
October 4	11:30 am	No. 12 Florida	Donald W. Reynolds Razorback Stadium; Fayetteville, AR	Raycom	L 7–38	70,072
October 11	4:00 pm	at No. 20 Auburn	Jordan–Hare Stadium; Auburn, AL	PPV	W 25–22	85,782
October 18	6:00 pm	at Kentucky	Commonwealth Stadium; Lexington, KY	ESPNU	L 20–21	70,534
October 25	6:00 pm	Ole Miss	Donald W. Reynolds Razorback Stadium; Fayetteville, AR (rivalry)	PPV	L 21–23	74,168
November 1	1:00 pm	No. 19 Tulsa*^{†}	Donald W. Reynolds Razorback Stadium; Fayetteville, AR	PPV	W 30–23	70,021
November 8	12:00 pm	at South Carolina	Williams–Brice Stadium; Columbia, SC	PPV	L 21–34	80,290
November 22	1:30 pm	at Mississippi State	Davis Wade Stadium; Starkville, MS		L 28–31	42,056
November 28	1:30 pm	LSU	War Memorial Stadium; Little Rock, AR (rivalry)	CBS	W 31–30	55,325
*Non-conference game; ^{†}Homecoming; Rankings from AP Poll released prior to the game; All times are in Central time

== Before the season ==
=== Coaching change ===
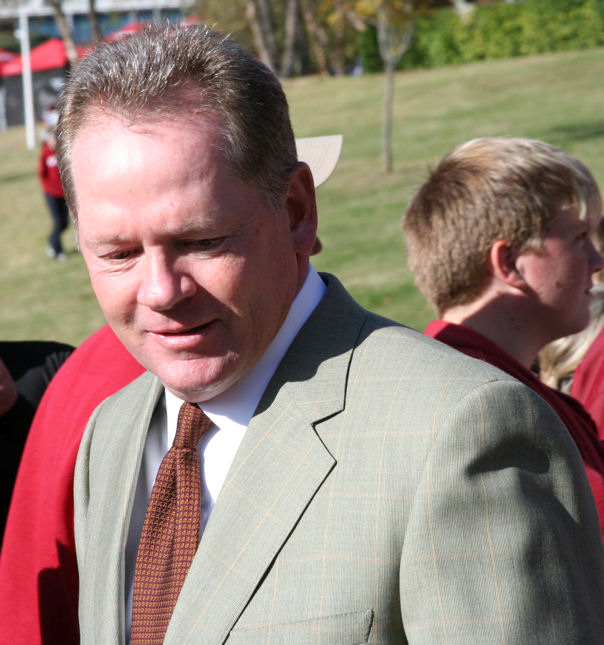
Bobby Petrino, Arkansas' head coach

Following the final game of the 2007 season, head coach Houston Nutt resigned from his position at Arkansas. He would later accept the head coaching position at Arkansas's division rival, the Ole Miss Rebels.

After Houston Nutt's resignation, former Louisville Cardinals' and Atlanta Falcons' head coach Bobby Petrino was hired to be the new head coach of the Razorbacks. Petrino's contract with Arkansas is a five-year deal worth $2.85 million per year in annual compensation.

Petrino hired Bobby Allen (defensive tackles), Kirk Botkin (defensive ends and special teams coordinator), Dean Campbell (director of high school relations), Tim Horton (running backs, tight ends and recruiting coordinator), Reggie Johnson (linebackers), Chip Long (graduate assistant), Garrick McGee (quarterbacks), Paul Petrino (offensive coordinator), Mark Robinson (director of football operations), Courtney Sanders (graduate assistant), Mike Summers (offensive line), Jason Veltkamp (strength and conditioning), and Lorenzo Ward (secondary). Ellis Johnson was originally hired to be the defensive coordinator; however, Johnson resigned from his post to take a job with the South Carolina Gamecocks on January 24, 2008. On February 6, 2008, Petrino hired former St. Louis Rams' secondary coach Willy Robinson as defensive coordinator.

=== Players ===
Arkansas returned seven starters on offense and four starters on defense. Returnees on offense included quarterback Casey Dick, who threw for 1,695 yards and 18 touchdowns in the 2007 season, and 2007 Dave Rimington Trophy winner Jonathan Luigs. Three players were named to the Southeastern Conference's Pre-Season All-SEC Team: Jonathan Luigs, Mitch Petrus, and Antwain Robinson.

==== Departures ====
The University of Arkansas graduated 11 starting seniors in 2007, which included All-SEC offensive tackle Robert Felton, offensive tackle Nate Garner, fullback Peyton Hillis, wide receiver Robert Johnson, wide receiver Marcus Monk, defensive tackle Marcus Harrison, linebacker Weston Dacus, cornerback Michael Grant, cornerback Matterral Richardson, strong safety Matt Hewitt, and free safety Kevin Woods.

Arkansas also lost consensus All-American tailback Darren McFadden, All-American tailback Felix Jones, and wide receiver Sean Penix as they decided to skip their senior season and declare for the 2008 NFL draft. The team also lost three quarterbacks in the off-season. Brian Reader stated he would transfer to Monterey Peninsula College, Nathan Emert left the team to pursue a career as a minister, and Clark Irwin left the team to pursue a career in finance and real estate. Placekicker Brian Vavra also decided to leave the team to pursue other opportunities. Citing lack of playing time, fullback Hezekiah Smith transferred to in-state UAPB. After spring training began, redshirt freshman linebacker Tim Dial announced that he was leaving the team to transfer to East Central University.

The Razorbacks also lost linebacker Freddie Fairchild when he was dismissed from the team on June 11, 2008.

==== Transfers ====
In January 2008, former five-star quarterback recruit Ryan Mallett transferred from Michigan to Arkansas. Due to NCAA transfer rules, Mallett would redshirt his sophomore year and would be able to compete in the 2009 season; however, he would be allowed on the scout team in the 2008 season.

==== Recruits ====
On National Signing Day, February 6, 2008, Arkansas received 25 letters of intent by the following players listed below:

College recruiting (2008)
Name	Hometown	School	Height	Weight	40^{‡}	Commit date
Joe Adams; ATH	Little Rock, Arkansas	Central Arkansas Christian	6 ft 1 in (1.85 m)	171 lb (78 kg)	4.45	Feb 6, 2008
Joe Adams; ATH	Recruit ratings: Scout: Rivals: (83)					
Lavunce Askew; DL	Camden, Arkansas	Camden Fairview HS	6 ft 3 in (1.91 m)	280 lb (130 kg)	4.83	Jul 28, 2007
Lavunce Askew; DL	Recruit ratings: Scout: Rivals: (78)					
Khiry Battle; ATH	Dacula, Georgia	Dacula HS	6 ft 0 in (1.83 m)	204 lb (93 kg)	4.58	Jul 21, 2007
Khiry Battle; ATH	Recruit ratings: Scout: Rivals: (76)					
Greg Childs; WR	Warren, Arkansas	Warren HS	6 ft 5 in (1.96 m)	198 lb (90 kg)	4.5	Jul 26, 2007
Greg Childs; WR	Recruit ratings: Scout: Rivals: (79)					
Brian Christopher; DE	Camden, Arkansas	Camden Fairview HS	6 ft 4 in (1.93 m)	240 lb (110 kg)	4.84	Feb 6, 2008
Brian Christopher; DE	Recruit ratings: Scout: Rivals: (40)					
De'Anthony Curtis; RB	Camden, Arkansas	Camden Fairview HS	5 ft 10 in (1.78 m)	204 lb (93 kg)	4.41	Jul 7, 2007
De'Anthony Curtis; RB	Recruit ratings: Scout: Rivals: (82)					
Alfred Davis; DT	College Park, Georgia	Banneker HS	6 ft 2 in (1.88 m)	292 lb (132 kg)	5.56	Jan 27, 2008
Alfred Davis; DT	Recruit ratings: Scout: Rivals: (72)					
Austin Eoff; OG	Fort Smith, Arkansas	Northside HS	6 ft 5 in (1.96 m)	309 lb (140 kg)	5.32	Jun 14, 2007
Austin Eoff; OG	Recruit ratings: Scout: Rivals: (75)					
Elton Ford; LB	Lithonia, Georgia	Lithonia HS	6 ft 0 in (1.83 m)	203 lb (92 kg)	4.52	Jan 27, 2008
Elton Ford; LB	Recruit ratings: Scout: Rivals: (75)					
Albert Gary; RB	Citra, Florida	North Marion HS	5 ft 10 in (1.78 m)	177 lb (80 kg)	4.5	Feb 6, 2008
Albert Gary; RB	Recruit ratings: Scout: Rivals: (79)					
Chris Gragg; WR	Warren, Arkansas	Warren HS	6 ft 3 in (1.91 m)	195 lb (88 kg)	4.6	Jul 22, 2007
Chris Gragg; WR	Recruit ratings: Scout: Rivals: (40)					
Matt Hall; OT	Russellville, Arkansas	Russellville HS	6 ft 10 in (2.08 m)	313 lb (142 kg)	5.62	Sep 3, 2006
Matt Hall; OT	Recruit ratings: Scout: Rivals: (77)					
Dennis Johnson; RB	Texarkana, Arkansas	Arkansas HS	5 ft 8 in (1.73 m)	180 lb (82 kg)	4.4	Jan 14, 2008
Dennis Johnson; RB	Recruit ratings: Scout: Rivals: (77)					
Basmine Jones; ATH	Warren, Arkansas	Warren HS	6 ft 0 in (1.83 m)	195 lb (88 kg)	4.51	Jun 26, 2007
Basmine Jones; ATH	Recruit ratings: Scout: Rivals: (40)					
Jerico Nelson; ATH	Destrehan, Louisiana	Destrehan HS	5 ft 10 in (1.78 m)	192 lb (87 kg)	4.48	Feb 3, 2008
Jerico Nelson; ATH	Recruit ratings: Scout: Rivals: (80)					
Anthony Oden; OL	Indianapolis, Indiana	Dunbar HS	6 ft 8 in (2.03 m)	288 lb (131 kg)	4.87	Jan 27, 2008
Anthony Oden; OL	Recruit ratings: Scout: Rivals: (72)					
Chris Raggett; DB/WR	Beaumont, Texas	Ozen HS	5 ft 11 in (1.80 m)	288 lb (131 kg)	4.50	Feb 5, 2008
Chris Raggett; DB/WR	Recruit ratings: Scout: Rivals: (40)					
Jelani Smith; LB	Abbeville, Louisiana	Abbeville HS	6 ft 1 in (1.85 m)	209 lb (95 kg)	4.63	Jun 1, 2007
Jelani Smith; LB	Recruit ratings: Scout: Rivals: (77)					
Zach Stadther; DT	North Little Rock, Arkansas	North Little Rock HS	6 ft 2 in (1.88 m)	275 lb (125 kg)	4.9	Jan 29, 2008
Zach Stadther; DT	Recruit ratings: Scout: Rivals: (75)					
Tramain Thomas; ATH	Winnie, Texas	East Chambers HS	6 ft 2 in (1.88 m)	175 lb (79 kg)	4.5	Feb 3, 2008
Tramain Thomas; ATH	Recruit ratings: Scout: Rivals: (75)					
Cruz Williams; WR	Little Rock, Arkansas	Pulaski Academy	6 ft 4 in (1.93 m)	201 lb (91 kg)	4.45	May 18, 2007
Cruz Williams; WR	Recruit ratings: Scout: Rivals: (79)					
Tyler Wilson; QB	Greenwood, Arkansas	Greenwood HS	6 ft 3 in (1.91 m)	184 lb (83 kg)	4.75	Dec 17, 2007
Tyler Wilson; QB	Recruit ratings: Scout: Rivals: (82)					
Jarius Wright; WR	Warren, Arkansas	Warren HS	5 ft 11 in (1.80 m)	178 lb (81 kg)	4.4	Jul 25, 2007
Jarius Wright; WR	Recruit ratings: Scout: Rivals: (79)					
Tenarius Wright; LB	Memphis, Tennessee	Whitehaven HS	6 ft 2 in (1.88 m)	220 lb (100 kg)	4.71	Nov 7, 2007
Tenarius Wright; LB	Recruit ratings: Scout: Rivals: (70)					
Jim Youngblood; QB	Camden, Arkansas	Camden Fairview HS	6 ft 3 in (1.91 m)	215 lb (98 kg)	4.69	Feb 27, 2007
Jim Youngblood; QB	Recruit ratings: Scout: Rivals: (75)					
Overall recruit ranking: Scout: 23 Rivals: 37
‡ Refers to 40-yard dash; Note: In many cases, Scout, Rivals, 247Sports, On3, and ESPN may conflict in their listings of height, weight and 40 time.; In these cases, the average was taken. ESPN grades are on a 100-point scale.; Sources: "Arkansas Commit List for 2008". Rivals.; "Scout.com Football Recruiting: Arkansas". Scout.; "2008 Player Commitments – Arkansas". ESPN.; "Scout.com Team Recruiting Rankings". Scout.; "2008 Team Ranking". Rivals.com.

== Game summaries ==
=== Western Illinois ===
	1	2	3	4	Total
Leathernecks	3	7	7	7	24
Razorbacks	0	7	7	14	28

The game was played at Donald W. Reynolds Razorback Stadium and marked the first meeting between the two programs. The game started with a Taylor Rowan field goal to give the Leathernecks a 3–0 advantage. Joe Adams of Arkansas pulled in a 10-yard pass from Casey Dick with six minutes remaining in the second quarter. WIU's Herb Donaldson then scored twice, once before halftime, and once after. Dick followed with a 23-yard TD scamper, cutting it to a 17–14 WIU lead. Leatherneck fullback Javid Milton ran the ball from one yard out to give Western Illinois a 24–14 lead. Freshman receiver Greg Childs then caught a Dick aerial at the 7:58 mark in the fourth quarter, with Dick running in the game winning score with only 1:49 remaining.

Western Illinois was ranked 22nd in the Football Championship Subdivision entering the contest.

=== Louisiana–Monroe ===
	1	2	3	4	Total
Razorbacks	0	6	8	14	28
Warhawks	0	10	14	3	27

Arkansas is undefeated in the series, with the last game against the Warhawks in 2006, when Arkansas defeated Louisiana–Monroe 44–10. The 2008 game was played at War Memorial Stadium and marked the 8th time the two programs have played each other.^{[c]} Michael Smith began the scoring with a 13-yard run to paydirt for the Hogs, but Alex Tejada missed the extra point, giving the Hogs only a 6–0 lead. The Warhawks responded with a one-yard pass from fifth-year senior QB Kinsmon Lancaster to Anthony McCall, and Jeremy Gener added a 20-yard field goal to give Monroe a 10–6 lead. Lancaster again hit McCall in the third quarter, this time from 33 yards away, and Gary Fraizer added another Warhawk score to open up a 24–6 advantage over the Razorbacks. The Razorbacks responded with an eight-yard strike to DJ Williams from Casey Dick. The two hooked up again for a two-point conversion, cutting the Warhawk advantage to 24–14. Gener added a field goal with 12:56 remaining in the fourth quarter, but Smith would score again, this time followed by a Shay Haddock completed extra point, cutting the deficit to six. Williams caught a touchdown with eighty-two seconds left, and Haddock connected on the game winning extra point. Lancaster would set Gener up with a game-winning opportunity, but he missed the 45-yard attempt right.

=== Alabama ===
	1	2	3	4	Total
#13 Crimson Tide	21	14	7	7	49
Razorbacks	0	7	0	7	14

Arkansas entered SEC play at home against the Alabama Crimson Tide, as a 9-point underdog. Alabama received the opening kickoff and scored first on their opening drive. The opening drive was helped by a roughing the kicker penalty against Arkansas allowing Alabama to retain possession. Arkansas put together a drive out to midfield on their first drive of the game, but were forced to punt. On the first play of their next drive, Alabama running back Glen Coffee ran 87 yards on the first play for Alabama's second touchdown. At the end of the first quarter, Alabama defensive back Javier Arenas intercepted Casey Dick and returned it 31 yards for a touchdown to put Alabama up 21–0. Arkansas started their next drive at their own 47 yard line after a 41-yard kickoff return by Dennis Johnson, and drove 53 yards for a touchdown on fourth down and 1 from the Alabama 12 yard line. Alabama responded with a 68-yard touchdown drive, capped off by a 25-yard touchdown pass from John Parker Wilson to Julio Jones. On Arkansas's next possession, Alabama corner Justin Woodall intercepted Casey Dick at the Alabama 26 yard line and returned it 74 yards for a touchdown. Arkansas would put together another solid drive, but facing a first and goal at the Alabama one yard line, Alabama stopped Arkansas on 4 plays for a goal line stand. At the half, Alabama was up 35–7.

Arkansas received the second half kickoff and Alabama's Marquis Johnson intercepted Casey Dick's pass on the first play of the second half, setting up a 31-yard touchdown run by Glen Coffee. By the end of the 3rd quarter, both teams had put in their substitutes. On Alabama's first possession of the fourth quarter, backup quarterback Greg McElroy's pass was intercepted by Ramon Broadway, setting up a 10-yard touchdown pass by Arkansas second-string quarterback Tyler Wilson. But on the first play of Alabama's next drive, running back Roy Upchurch ran 62 yards for Alabama's final touchdown. The final score was 49–14, the largest margin of victory in the series since Arkansas beat Alabama 42–6 in 1998.

=== Texas ===
	1	2	3	4	Total
Razorbacks	0	3	0	7	10
#7 Longhorns	10	21	14	7	52

One of the biggest match-ups between Arkansas and Texas was the 1969 Game of the Century, which pitted #1 Texas and #2 Arkansas in Fayetteville to determine the national championship; Texas won 15–14. In the most recent match-up between the two programs, the Longhorns achieved a 22–20 win against an unranked Arkansas team. The two schools were once conference foes in the Southwest Conference and Texas leads the series 55–21–0. The 2008 game was scheduled to be played on September 13, 2008, but the potential severe weather from Hurricane Ike postponed the game. The game was rescheduled and was played in Darrell K Royal–Texas Memorial Stadium on September 27, 2008.

Hunter Lawrence of Texas began the scoring with a 34-yard field goal. This was followed by an eight-yard Colt McCoy pass to Jordan Shipley resulting in a touchdown. With a 10–0 lead, Cody Johnson scored for the Longhorns, giving a 17–0 cushion. Arkansas kicker Shay Haddock connected on a 30-yard boot, but McCoy ran for two more touchdowns, of five and thirty-five yards respectively, before halftime. After halftime, Texas continued to roll, with McCoy TD passes to Quan Cosby and Shipley. Aaron Williams returned an interception eighty-one yards for another Texas score, prompting Arkansas' lone touchdown, an eighty-yard fumble return by defensive end Antwain Robinson with 2:20 in response.

The win gave Texas the largest margin of victory in the rivalry since the 1916 edition, a 52–0 drubbing at Clark Field.

=== Florida ===
	1	2	3	4	Total
#13 Gators	7	7	3	21	38
Razorbacks	0	0	7	0	7

The two programs last played each other in the 2006 SEC Championship Game where #4 Florida defeated #8 Arkansas 38–28. The game was played at Donald W. Reynolds Razorback Stadium and marked the eighth time the two programs have played each other, with Florida leading the series 7–1–0. The game's scoring began with Florida standout QB Tim Tebow's shovel pass to Brandon James for a touchdown. After both teams punted, Florida punted to Michael Smith of Arkansas, who fumbled, giving the Gators the ball. Jeffery Demps scored from 36 yards out to make it a 14–0 Florida advantage. Arkansas had a chance to score before halftime, but the Casey Dick pass was intercepted at the goalline. Gator kicker Jonathan Phillips hit a field goal from 37 yards out to push the UF edge to 17–0. Michael Smith and the Hogs responded with a drive that ended with a Smith rushing touchdown of six yards to cut the deficit to 17–7. Tebow then threw his first interception of the year to redshirt freshman Jerry Franklin, but the Hogs could not capitalize. Florida went on a scoring tear, first with Tebow throwing a 21-yard touchdown to Percy Harvin, followed by Chris Rainey's 75-yard rushing score and Demps' score of 48 yards. Dick passed Joe Ferguson on the school's all-time passing list to become seventh all-time in the fourth quarter.

=== Auburn ===
	1	2	3	4	Total
Razorbacks	3	7	6	9	25
#23 Tigers	7	6	7	2	22

In the 2007 contest, Wes Byrum kicked his second game-winning field goal giving #25 Auburn a 9–7 victory. The 2008 game was played at Jordan–Hare Stadium and marked the 18th time the two programs have played each other with Auburn leading the series 10–7–1. Three days prior to the contest, Auburn fired offensive coordinator Tony Franklin, a proponent of the spread offense.

In Arkansas' fourth-straight AP Top 25 game (all four opponents were in the top 10 when the trip began), the Hogs finally prevailed, 25–22, giving head Hog Bobby Petrino his first SEC victory. The Razorbacks began the scoring, a Shay Haddock field goal with 6:46 remaining in the first quarter. On the ensuing Tiger possession, Tristan Davis returned the kickoff 97 yards for a touchdown, giving a 7–3 lead to Auburn. The second quarter began with a Wes Byrum field goal before the Razorbacks pieced together a touchdown drive, culminating in a one-yard Casey Dick rush. It appeared that the teams would enter halftime tied at 10, but a pass was deflected into the hands of an Auburn receiver, who set up another Byrum field goal to give the Tigers a 13–10 edge at the half. One part of the Tigers' QB carousel, Kodi Burns, a Ft. Smith native, scored from two yards out, giving Auburn a 20–10 lead in the third quarter. Arkansas responded with a reverse pass from true freshman receiver Joe Adams to Casey Dick, but the Haddock extra point was blocked, giving Auburn a four-point lead. The Hogs added a Haddock field goal to start the fourth quarter, cutting the lead to 20–19, before Smith broke free and outran Auburn defenders 63 yards for the longest rushing touchdown of the season. Up five points, Arkansas punter Jeremy Davis ran out of the endzone for an intentional safety, cutting the lead to 3. Burns threw three incompletions, and on fourth down was intercepted by Matt Hewitt, sealing the victory for Arkansas.

=== Kentucky ===
	1	2	3	4	Total
Razorbacks	7	7	3	3	20
Wildcats	0	0	7	14	21

Arkansas' last met Kentucky in the 2007 contest in Fayetteville, Arkansas, which resulted in a 42–29 victory for #23 Kentucky when Andre Woodson led the team to a second half comeback against Arkansas. The 2008 game was played at Commonwealth Stadium and marked the 6th time the two programs have played each other with Kentucky leading the series 3–2–0.

=== Ole Miss ===
	1	2	3	4	Total
Rebels	3	10	0	10	23
Razorbacks	0	7	0	14	21

In the 2007 contest, Arkansas defeated Ole Miss 44–7. The 2008 game was played at Donald W. Reynolds Razorback Stadium and marked the 55th time the two programs have played each other with Arkansas leading the series 29–24–1.

=== Tulsa ===
	1	2	3	4	Total
#18 Golden Hurricane	7	13	3	0	23
Razorbacks	17	6	7	0	30

The 2008 game against Tulsa was Arkansas' homecoming game and was played at Donald W. Reynolds Razorback Stadium. This marked the 71st time the two programs have played each other with Arkansas leading the series 51–16–3.

=== South Carolina ===
	1	2	3	4	Total
Razorbacks	0	7	7	7	21
Gamecocks	10	7	3	14	34

In the 2007 contest, Arkansas defeated South Carolina 48–36 as South Carolina gave up 542 rushing yards. The 2008 game was played at Williams-Brice Stadium and marked the 17th time the two programs have played each other with Arkansas leading the series 10–6–0.

=== Mississippi State ===
	1	2	3	4	Total
Razorbacks	14	0	7	7	28
Bulldogs	7	10	7	7	31

In the 2007 contest, Casey Dick threw a career-high four touchdown passes that allowed Arkansas to defeat Mississippi State 45–31. The 2008 game was played at Davis Wade Stadium and marked the 19th time the two programs have played each other with Arkansas leading the series 12–5–1.

=== LSU ===
	1	2	3	4	Total
Tigers	3	20	7	0	30
Razorbacks	14	0	7	10	31

The defending national champions LSU Tigers sought to reclaim the Golden Boot after losing it at Death Valley when unranked Arkansas beat then #1 LSU 50–48 in triple overtime. The 2008 game was originally scheduled to be played on November 29, 2008 but was moved to November 28, 2008 to accommodate a national broadcast by CBS Sports. The game was played at War Memorial Stadium and marked the 13th time the two teams play for the Golden Boot. The game also marked the 54th time the two programs have played each other with LSU leading the series 33–18–2. The outcome of the game was decided by a touchdown pass by quarterback Casey Dick to receiver London Crawford in the last twenty seconds of the game to tie the game. A successful extra point kick gave the Razorbacks a one-point lead which LSU failed to overcome in the remaining seconds, thus allowing Arkansas to retain possession of the Golden Boot for another year.

=== Personnel ===
==== Coaching staff ====
2008 Arkansas Razorbacks coaching staff
Head coaches: Head coach – Bobby Petrino; Offensive coaches: Offensive coordinator – Paul Petrino; Quarterbacks – Garrick McGee; Running backs – Tim Horton; Tight ends – Tim Horton; Offensive line – Mike Summers; Graduate assistant – Chip Long; Defensive coaches: Defensive coordinator – Willy Robinson; Linebackers – Reggie Johnson; Defensive tackle – Bobby Allen; Defensive ends – Kirk Botkin; Secondary – Lorenzo Ward; Graduate assistant – Courtney Sanders	Special teams: Special teams coordinator – Kirk Botkin; Administrative staff: Athletic director (AD) – Jeff Long; Director of high school relations – Dean Campbell; Director of football operations – Mark Robinson; Strength and conditioning – Jason Veltkamp; Recruiting coordinator – Tim Horton

==== Roster ====
2008 Arkansas Razorbacks roster
Post-Spring Roster from the University of Arkansas Razorbacks Athletics
Quarterbacks: 7 Alex Mortensen – Senior; 8 Tyler Wilson – Freshman; 10 Nathan Dick – (redshirt) Freshman; 11 Casey Dick – Senior; 14 Jim Youngblood – Freshman; 15 Ryan Mallett – (redshirt) Sophomore; Tailbacks: – Landon Williams – Freshman; 6 Brandon Barnett – Junior; 21 Michael Smith – Junior; 22 Albert Gary – Freshman; 23 De'Anthony Curtis – Freshman; 33 Dennis Johnson – Freshman; 42 Chip Gregory – Sophomore; Fullbacks: – John Durmon – Junior; – Darcel Johnson – (redshirt) Freshman; 16 Seth Armbrust – (redshirt) Sophomore; 22 Matt Crowder – Freshman; 30 Mitchell Bailey – Freshman; Wide receivers: – Austin Tucker – (redshirt) Freshman; 1 Reggie Fish – Senior; 2 London Crawford – Junior; 3 Joe Adams – Freshman; 4 Jarius Wright – Freshman; 13 Rod Coleman – Junior; 19 Carlton Salters – Sophomore; 80 Chris Gragg – Freshman; 81 Marques Wade – Sophomore; 84 Crosby Tuck – (redshirt) Freshman; 85 Greg Childs – Freshman; 87 John Aaron Rees – Senior; 88 Lucas Miller – Junior; 89 Joe Chaisson – (redshirt) Freshman	Tight ends: – Joseph Henry – Junior; 45 D.J. Williams – Sophomore; 82 Andrew Davie – Junior; 83 Lance Thompson – Senior; 86 Ben Cleveland – Sophomore; Offensive tackles: – Jim Hart – Sophomore; 62 Michael Aguirre – Junior; 72 Grant Cook – (redshirt) Freshman; 73 Ray Dominguez – Sophomore; 75 Matt Hall – Freshman; 78 Jose Valdez – Senior; 79 Grant Freeman – (redshirt) Freshman; Offensive guards: 65 DeMarcus Love – Sophomore; 66 Mitch Petrus – Senior; 71 Wade Grayson – Sophomore; 74 Kareem Crowell – (redshirt) Freshman; Centers: – Clay Bemberg – Sophomore; 53 Austin Eoff – Freshman; 60 Seth Oxner – (redshirt) Freshman; 63 Jonathan Luigs – Senior; Defensive ends: – Chris Berezansky – Sophomore; 53 Adrian Davis – Junior; 57 Donnell Sanders – Sophomore; 57 Damario Ambrose – Sophomore; 91 Jake Bequette – (redshirt) Freshman; 94 Brian Christopher – Freshman; 97 Antwain Robinson – Senior	Defensive tackles: 59 Van Stumon – Sophomore; 92 Brandon Lampkin – (redshirt) Freshman; 93 Marcus Shavers – Senior; 95 Patrick Jones – Sophomore; 96 Malcolm Sheppard – Junior; 98 Cord Gray – Senior; 99 Lavunce Askew – Freshman; Nose tackles: 61 Zach Stadther – Freshman; 69 Alfred Davis – Freshman; 90 Ernest Mitchell – Senior; Linebackers: – Stephen Barnett – Sophomore; – Aaron Fenton – Sophomore; 34 Jerry Franklin – (redshirt) Freshman; 37 Jermaine Love – Sophomore; 38 Elston Forte – Senior; 40 Josh Minde – (redshirt) Freshman; 41 Ryan Powers – Sophomore; 43 Tenarius Wright – Freshman; 44 Matt Marshall – Freshman; 46 Freddy Burton – Sophomore; 47 Wendel Davis – Junior; 49 Jelani Smith – Freshman; 52 Robert Salinas – Junior; Cornerbacks: 5 Tramain Thomas – Freshman; 17 Shedrick Johnson – Senior; 24 Isaac Madison – Sophomore; 26 Ramon Broadway – Sophomore; 27 Jerell Norton – Junior; 28 Greg Gatson – Sophomore; 29 Jamar Love – Senior	Safeties: – Evan Bettis – Sophomore; 9 Elton Ford – Freshman; 14 Hunter Miller – Freshman; 20 Dallas Washington – Senior; 25 Khiry Battle – Freshman; 30 Chris Raggett – Freshman; 31 Jerico Nelson – Freshman; 32 Bret Harris – (redshirt) Freshman; 35 Rashaad Johnson – Junior; 36 Walner Leandre – Senior; 39 Matt Harris – Junior; Punters: – Mitchell Smith – Junior; 50 Jeremy Davis – Senior; Kickers: – Cody Williams – (redshirt) Freshman; 7 Alex Tejada – Sophomore; 27 Shay Haddock – Sophomore; Long snappers: – Derrell Hartwick – (redshirt) Freshman; – Barrett Reynolds – Sophomore; 51 Rhett Richardson – Sophomore; Terms: Freshman – A player in his first year.; Sophomore – A player in his second year.; Junior – A player in his third year.; Senior – A player in his fourth year.; Redshirt – A player who sat out in 2007.

== Statistics ==
=== Team ===
	Team	Opp
Scoring	263	374
Points per game	21.9	31.2
First downs	232	229
Rushing	83	109
Passing	134	108
Penalty	15	12
Total offense	4477	4502
Avg per play	5.5	5.6
Avg per game	373.1	375.2
Fumbles-Lost	16–7	20–5
Penalties-Yards	79–584	66–563
Avg yards per Game	48.7	46.9

	Team	Opp
Punts-Yards	58-2468	51-2131
Avg yards per Punt	42.6	41.8
Time of possession/Game	30:26	29:34
3rd down conversions	65 of 176	72/173
4th down conversions	14 of 26	11 of 19
Touchdowns scored	34	46
Field goals-Attempts	9–16	7–24
PAT-Attempts	30–32	45–46

==== Scores by quarter ====
	1	2	3	4	Total
Arkansas	55	57	59	92	263
Opponents	78	125	79	92	374

=== Offense ===
==== Rushing ====
Name	GP-GS	Att	Gain	Loss	Net	Avg	TD	Long	Avg/G
Michael Smith	10–9	207	1119	47	1072	5.2	8	63	107.2
Dennis Johnson	12–2	36	194	10	184	5.1	1	54	15.3
DeAnthony Curtis	10–0	23	83	7	76	3.3	0	18	7.6
Brandon Barnett	6–0	12	61	0	61	5.1	1	23	10.2
Joe Adams	12–7	6	55	9	46	7.7	0	19	3.8
Nathan Dick	3–2	11	42	22	20	1.8	0	15	6.7
Jarius Wright	12–7	1	1	0	1	1.0	0	1	0.1
London Crawford	12–11	1	0	5	(−5)	(−5.0)	0	0	(−0.4)
TEAM	8–0	5	0	8	(−8)	(−1.6)	0	0	(−1.0)
Jeremy Davis	12–0	1	0	10	(−10)	(−10.0)	0	0	(−0.8)
Tyler Wilson	2–0	3	0	24	(−24)	(−8.0)	0	0	(−12.0)
Casey Dick	11–10	72	210	261	(−51)	(−0.7)	3	24	(−4.6)
Total	12	378	1765	403	1362	3.6	13	63	113.5
Opponents	12	461	2348	299	2049	4.4	20	87	170.8

==== Passing ====
Name	GP–GS	Effic	Att–Cmp–Int	Pct	Yds	TD	Lng	Avg/G
Casey Dick	11–10	122.44	205–357–14	57.4	2586	13	76	235.1
Nathan Dick	3–2	134.41	36–62–2	58.1	454	4	87	151.3
Tyler Wilson	2–0	73.16	11–22–2	50.0	69	1	10	34.5
TEAM	8–0	0.00	0–1–0	0.0	0	0	0	0
Joe Adams	12–7	480.40	1–1–0	100.0	6	1	6	0.5
Total	12	122.20	253–443–18	57.1	3115	19	87	259.6
Opponents	12	127.28	185–347–11	53.3	2453	22	71	204.4

==== Receiving ====
Name	GP-GS	No.	Yds	Avg	TD	Long	Avg/G
DJ Williams	12–8	61	723	11.9	3	76	60.2
Michael Smith	10–9	32	296	9.3	2	41	29.8
Joe Adams	12–7	31	377	12.2	1	33	31.4
Lucas Miller	12–6	30	490	16.3	2	87	40.8
London Crawford	12–11	27	311	11.5	1	34	25.9
Jarius Wright	12–7	19	348	18.3	2	70	29.0
Greg Childs	12–1	18	273	15.2	2	39	22.8
Andrew Davie	12–4	8	71	8.9	3	16	5.9
DeAnthony Curtis	10–0	8	68	8.5	0	22	6.8
Carlton Salters	10–1	6	66	11.0	0	21	6.6
Dennis Johnson	12–2	4	23	5.8	0	10	1.9
Crosby Tuck	9–1	2	18	9.0	0	12	2.0
Casey Dick	11–10	2	3	1.5	1	6	0.3
Chris Gragg	12–3	1	25	25.0	0	25	2.1
Brandon Barnett	6–0	1	9	9.0	0	9	1.5
Jermaine Love	11–0	1	7	7.0	0	7	0.6
Mitchell Bailey	3–0	1	4	4.0	0	4	1.3
Ben Cleveland	9–0	1	1	1.0	0	1	0.1
Total	12	253	3115	12.3	19	87	259.6
Opponents	12	185	2453	13.3	22	71	204.4

=== Defense ===
Name	GP	Tackles				Sacks	Pass defense		Interceptions				Fumbles		Blkd Kick
Name	GP	Solo	Ast	Total	TFL-Yds	No-Yds	BrUp	QBH	No.-Yds	Avg	TD	Long	Rcv-Yds	FF	Blkd Kick
Total	12	676	311	987	69–291	23–147	53	62	11–138	12.5	0		4–97	9	0
Opponents	12	513	318	831	93–400	46–287	49	44	18–421	23.4	0		7–0	3	1

=== Special teams ===
Name	Punting								Kickoffs				
Name	No.	Yds	Avg	Long	TB	FC	I20	Blkd	No.	Yds	Avg	TB	OB
Jeremy Davis	57	2460	43.2	58	5	11	17	0	24	1432	59.7	0	0
Alex Tejada	0	0	0	0	0	0	0	0	29	1750	60.3	1	1
TEAM	1	8	8.0	8	0	0	0	1	0	0	0	0	0
Total	58	2468	42.6	58	5	11	17	1	53	3182	60.0	1	1

Name	Punt returns					Kick returns				
Name	No.	Yds	Avg	TD	Long	No.	Yds	Avg	TD	Long
Jarius Wright	6	15	2.5	0	8	0	0	0	0	0
Michael Smith	5	44	8.8	0	16	0	0	0	0	0
Jerell Norton	4	21	5.2	0	11	0	0	0	0	0
Dennis Johnson	0	0	0	0	0	41	905	22.1	1	96
Elton Ford	0	0	0	0	0	6	127	21.2	0	32
London Crawford	0	0	0	0	0	2	31	15.5	0	18
Aaron Fenton	0	0	0	0	0	2	21	10.5	0	15
Joe Adams	0	0	0	0	0	1	20	20.0	0	20
Total	15	80	5.3	0	16	52	1104	21.2	1	96
Opponents	29	174	6.0	0	15	21	1226	24.0	1	97

== Footnotes ==
- ^{a} ^{b} ^{c} The University of Arkansas officially play one home game at War Memorial Stadium despite playing there two times. Under the agreement with the University of Louisiana at Monroe, the game at Little Rock, Arkansas against the Warhawks would be considered a home game for the Warhawks and the attendance count was used for their figures.
