= 2007 Arkansas Razorbacks football team =

American college football season

2007 Arkansas Razorbacks football

Cotton Bowl Classic, L 7–38 vs. Missouri
- Conference: Southeastern Conference
- Western Division
- Record: 8–5 (4–4 SEC)
- Head coach: Houston Nutt (10th season; regular season); Reggie Herring (interim; bowl game)
- Offensive coordinator: David Lee (2nd season)
- Offensive scheme: Pro-style
- Defensive coordinator: Reggie Herring (3rd season; regular season); Louis Campbell (interim; bowl game) (1st season)
- Base defense: 4–3
- Captains: Weston Dacus; Marcus Harrison; Robert Johnson; Marcus Monk; Matterral Richardson; Kevin Wood
- Home stadium: Donald W. Reynolds Razorback Stadium; War Memorial Stadium

2007 Southeastern Conference football standings
	Conf.			Overall
Team	W		L	W		L
Eastern Division
No. 12 Tennessee xy	6	–	2	10	–	4
No. 2 Georgia x%	6	–	2	11	–	2
No. 13 Florida	5	–	3	9	–	4
South Carolina	3	–	5	6	–	6
Kentucky	3	–	5	8	–	5
Vanderbilt	2	–	6	5	–	7
Western Division
No. 1 LSU x$#	6	–	2	12	–	2
No. 15 Auburn	5	–	3	9	–	4
Arkansas	4	–	4	8	–	5
Mississippi State	4	–	4	8	–	5
Alabama	4	–	4	7	–	6
Ole Miss	0	–	8	3	–	9
Championship: LSU 21, Tennessee 14
# – BCS National Champion; $ – BCS representative as conference champion; % – BCS at-large representative; x – Division champion/co-champions; y – Championship game participant; Alabama had 5 victories vacated by the NCAA in 2010. As such, the official record for Alabama is 2–6 (1–4).; Rankings from AP Poll

The 2007 Arkansas Razorbacks football team represented the University of Arkansas as a member of the Western Southeastern Conference (SEC) during the 2007 NCAA Division I FBS football season. Led by Houston Nutt in his tenth and final year as head coach during the regular season and Reggie Herring as interim head coach for the team's bowl game, the Razorbacks compiled an overall record of 8–5 with a mark of 4–4 in conference play, placing in a three-way tie for third in the SEC's Western Division. Arkansas was invited to the Cotton Bowl Classic, where the Razorbacks lost to Missouri. The team played four home games at Donald W. Reynolds Razorback Stadium in Fayetteville, Arkansas and two home games at War Memorial Stadium in Little Rock, Arkansas.

Running back Darren McFadden left Arkansas after the season holding most of the program's rushing records, including rushing yards in a single game (321), a season (1,830), and a career (4,590). The single game total is also an SEC record. McFadden became only the second player in school history to rush for 1,000 yards in three consecutive seasons, along with Ben Cowins, who played for Arkansas when the Razorbacks were members of the Southwest Conference (SWC). McFadden also became the second player in SEC history with three straight 1,000 yard seasons, after Herschel Walker of Georgia.

== Schedule ==
Date	Time	Opponent	Rank	Site	TV	Result	Attendance	Source
September 1	6:00 pm	Troy*	No. 21	Donald W. Reynolds Razorback Stadium; Fayetteville, AR		W 46–26	73,926	
September 15	5:45 pm	at Alabama	No. 16	Bryant–Denny Stadium; Tuscaloosa, AL	ESPN	L 38–41	92,138	
September 22	5:00 pm	No. 23 Kentucky		Donald W. Reynolds Razorback Stadium; Fayetteville, AR	ESPN2	L 29–42	74,015	
September 29	6:00 pm	North Texas*		Donald W. Reynolds Razorback Stadium; Fayetteville, AR		W 66–7	66,343	
October 6	6:00 pm	Chattanooga*		War Memorial Stadium; Little Rock, AR		W 34–15	54,836	
October 13	6:45 pm	No. 25 Auburn		Donald W. Reynolds Razorback Stadium; Fayetteville, AR	ESPN	L 7–9	72,463	
October 20	1:00 pm	at Ole Miss		Vaught–Hemingway Stadium; Oxford, MS (rivalry)		W 44–8	52,671	
October 27	1:00 pm	FIU*^{†}		Donald W. Reynolds Razorback Stadium; Fayetteville, AR		W 58–10	60,750	
November 3	7:00 pm	No. 23 South Carolina		Donald W. Reynolds Razorback Stadium; Fayetteville, AR	ESPN2	W 48–36	70,742	
November 10	11:30 am	at No. 22 Tennessee		Neyland Stadium; Knoxville, TN	LFS	L 13–34	104,459	
November 17	1:00 pm	Mississippi State		War Memorial Stadium; Little Rock, AR		W 45–31	55,185	
November 23	1:30 pm	at No. 1 LSU		Tiger Stadium; Baton Rouge, LA (rivalry)	CBS	W 50–48 ^{3OT}	92,606	
January 1	10:30 am	vs. No. 7 Missouri*	No. 25	Cotton Bowl; Dallas, TX (Cotton Bowl Classic)	Fox	L 7–38	73,114	
*Non-conference game; ^{†}Homecoming; Rankings from AP Poll released prior to the game; All times are in Central time

== Rankings ==
Ranking movements Legend: ██ Increase in ranking ██ Decrease in ranking — = Not ranked RV = Received votes
	Week															
Poll	Pre	1	2	3	4	5	6	7	8	9	10	11	12	13	14	Final
AP	21	18	16	RV	RV	RV	—	—	—	—	RV	RV	RV	RV	25	RV
Coaches	20	18	16	RV	—	—	—	—	—	—	RV	RV	RV	25	24	RV
Harris	Not released				RV	RV	RV	—	—	RV	RV	—	RV	RV	25	Not released
BCS	Not released							—	—	—	—	—	—	—	—	Not released

== Preseason ==
=== Coaching changes before the season ===
- Due to plans for David Lee to be hired as its co-offensive coordinator, Gus Malzahn departed to the University of Tulsa. Malzahn's departure led to Lee being named the sole offensive coordinator.
- Louis Campbell was previously the secondary coach, but was moved off the field after being named assistant athletic director for administrative services.
- Alex Wood was previously the quarterbacks coach but was moved to wide receivers coach.
- Chris Vaughn was named the safeties coach and will continue his role as the director of on-campus recruiting.
- Due to Danny Nutt's resignation as the running backs coach because of a recurrence of bleeding from his brain stem, the University of Arkansas has hired Tim Horton as its running backs coach.

=== Preseason award watchlists ===
- Jonathan Luigs, center
  - Rotary Lombardi Award
  - Outland Trophy
- Darren McFadden, running back
  - Heisman Trophy
  - Maxwell Award
  - Doak Walker Award
  - Walter Camp Award
- Felix Jones, running back
  - Maxwell Award
  - Doak Walker Award
- Marcus Monk, wide receiver
  - Maxwell Award
- Jeremy Davis, punter
  - Ray Guy Award

=== Preseason All-SEC ===
First Team

- Jonathan Luigs, center
- Darren McFadden, running back
- Felix Jones, running back and return specialist
- Marcus Monk, wide receiver

== Game summaries ==
=== Troy ===
	1	2	3	4	Total
Trojans	0	17	3	6	26
#20 Razorbacks	6	17	14	9	46

Scoring summary

Quarter	Time	Drive			Team	Scoring information	Score	
Quarter	Time	Plays	Yards	TOP	Team	Scoring information	TROY	ARK
1	12:55		61	2:05	ARK	35-yard field goal by Alex Tejada	0	3
1	05:44		35	4:54	ARK	23-yard field goal by Alex Tejada	0	6
2	14:54		67	2:51	ARK	Darren McFadden 12-yard touchdown run, Alex Tejada kick good	0	13
2	11:40		69	3:14	TROY	Kenny Cattouse 1-yard touchdown run, Greg Whibbs kick good	7	13
2	11:25		90	0:00	ARK	Felix Jones 90-yard touchdown kickoff return, Alex Tejada kick good	7	20
2	08:57		83	2:28	TROY	Gerald Tate 17-yard touchdown reception from Omar Haugabook, Greg Whibbs kick good	14	20
2	00:44		38	2:31	ARK	28-yard field goal by Alex Tejada	14	23
2	00:00		14	0:44	TROY	42-yard field goal by Greg Whibbs	17	23
3	06:48		76	3:04	ARK	Felix Jones 44-yard touchdown run, Alex Tejada kick good	17	30
3	05:32		42	0:10	ARK	Crosby Tuck 42-yard touchdown reception from Darren McFadden, Alex Tejada kick good	17	37
3	00:44		12	2:09	TROY	32-yard field goal by Greg Whibbs	20	37
4	09:47		54	5:56	ARK	30-yard field goal by Alex Tejada	20	40
4	06:45		55	1:02	ARK	Michael Smith 2-yard touchdown run, Alex Tejada kick no good	20	46
4	00:00		83	1:17	TROY	Tanner Jones 2-yard touchdown run	26	46
"TOP" = time of possession. For other American football terms, see Glossary of American football.							26	46

=== Alabama ===
	1	2	3	4	Total
#16 Razorbacks	0	10	7	21	38
Crimson Tide	21	0	10	10	41

Alabama built an early 21-point lead but had to mount a come-from-behind drive in the final two minutes of the game in order to capture a 41–38 victory.

Scoring summary

Quarter	Time	Drive			Team	Scoring information	Score	
Quarter	Time	Plays	Yards	TOP	Team	Scoring information	ARK	ALA
1	08:35		9	0:39	ALA	DJ Hall 9-yard touchdown reception from John Parker Wilson, Andrew Friedman kick good	0	7
1	04:21		74	1:44	ALA	Glen Coffee 14-yard touchdown run, Leigh Tiffin kick good	0	14
1	01:27		80	1:08	ALA	DJ Hall 35-yard touchdown reception from John Parker Wilson, Leigh Tiffin kick good	0	21
2	06:03		84	2:07	ARK	Crosby Tuck 40-yard touchdown reception from Casey Dick, Alex Tejada kick good	7	21
2	00:23		51	2:33	ARK	22-yard field goal by Alex Tejada	10	21
3	10:57		41	1:30	ALA	24-yard field goal by Leigh Tiffin	10	24
3	05:15		2	0:06	ALA	Nick Walker 2-yard touchdown reception from John Parker Wilson, Leigh Tiffin kick good	10	31
3	03:05		61	2:10	ARK	Andrew Davie 2-yard touchdown reception from Casey Dick, Alex Tejada kick good	17	31
4	14:56		42	1:27	ARK	Darren McFadden 1-yard touchdown run, Alex Tejada kick good	24	31
4	12:05		26	2:43	ARK	Darren McFadden 5-yard touchdown run, Alex Tejada kick good	31	31
4	08:08		64	2:22	ARK	Peyton Hillis 7-yard touchdown reception from Casey Dick, Alex Tejada kick good	38	31
4	04:20		46	3:48	ALA	42-yard field goal by Leigh Tiffin	38	34
4	00:08		73	2:05	ALA	Matt Caddell 4-yard touchdown reception from John Parker Wilson, Leigh Tiffin kick good	38	41
"TOP" = time of possession. For other American football terms, see Glossary of American football.							38	41

=== Kentucky ===
	1	2	3	4	Total
#23 Wildcats	7	7	7	21	42
Razorbacks	10	10	0	9	29

Scoring summary

Quarter	Time	Drive			Team	Scoring information	Score	
Quarter	Time	Plays	Yards	TOP	Team	Scoring information	UK	ARK
1	09:35		58	5:25	ARK	40-yard field goal by Alex Tejada	0	3
1	09:16		16	0:00	ARK	Fumble recovery returned 16 yards for touchdown by Antwain Robinson, Alex Tejada kick good	0	10
1	07:29		72	1:47	UK	Rafael Little 14-yard touchdown run, Lones Seiber kick good	7	10
2	11:05		77	2:41	ARK	20-yard field goal by Alex Tejada	7	13
2	05:41		80	2:00	ARK	Darren McFadden 56-yard touchdown run, Alex Tejada kick good	7	20
2	00:26		66	0:00	UK	Fumble recovery returned 66 yards for touchdown by Trevard Lindley, Lones Seiber kick good	14	20
3	11:00		80	4:00	UK	Keenan Burton 15-yard touchdown reception from Andre' Woodson, Lones Seiber kick good	21	20
4	11:51		--	--	ARK	Andre' Woodson tackled in end zone for a safety by Fred Bledsoe	21	22
4	11:40		82	0:00	ARK	Felix Jones 82-yard touchdown kickoff return, Alex Tejada kick good	21	29
4	07:59		80	3:41	UK	Derrick Locke 2-yard touchdown run, 2-point run no good	27	29
4	04:02		68	1:33	UK	Keenan Burton 32-yard touchdown reception from Andre' Woodson, 2-point pass good	35	29
4	00:59		24	1:03	UK	Andre' Woodson 1-yard touchdown run, Lones Seiber kick good	42	29
"TOP" = time of possession. For other American football terms, see Glossary of American football.							42	29

=== North Texas ===
	1	2	3	4	Total
Mean Green	0	7	0	0	7
Razorbacks	24	21	7	14	66

Scoring summary

Quarter	Time	Drive			Team	Scoring information	Score	
Quarter	Time	Plays	Yards	TOP	Team	Scoring information	UNT	ARK
1	13:08		69	1:52	ARK	Felix Jones 35-yard touchdown run, Alex Tejada kick good	0	7
1	09:51		81	1:30	ARK	London Crawford 61-yard touchdown reception from Casey Dick, Alex Tejada kick good	0	14
1	06:12		30	2:16	ARK	39-yard field goal by Alex Tejada	0	17
1	02:30		56	2:36	ARK	Darren McFadden 2-yard touchdown run, Alex Tejada kick good	0	24
2	14:10		80	1:23	ARK	Robert Johnson 37-yard touchdown reception from Casey Dick, Alex Tejada kick good	0	31
2	07:06		79	1:28	ARK	Felix Jones 71-yard touchdown run, Alex Tejada kick good	0	38
2	04:42		62	1:12	ARK	Darren McFadden 4-yard touchdown run, Alex Tejada kick good	0	45
2	01:24		80	3:18	UNT	Giovanni Vizza 1-yard touchdown run, Thoma Moreland kick good	7	45
3	12:45		19	1:23	ARK	Lucas Miller 5-yard touchdown reception from Casey Dick, Alex Tejada kick good	7	52
4	05:36		41	0:21	ARK	Brandon Barnett 5-yard touchdown run, Alex Tejada kick good	7	59
4	00:31		100	0:00	ARK	Interception returned 100 yards for touchdown by Jerrell Norton, Alex Tejada kick good	7	66
"TOP" = time of possession. For other American football terms, see Glossary of American football.							7	66

=== Chattanooga ===
	1	2	3	4	Total
Mocs	2	7	6	0	15
Razorbacks	14	3	7	10	34

Scoring summary

Quarter	Time	Drive			Team	Scoring information	Score	
Quarter	Time	Plays	Yards	TOP	Team	Scoring information	CHAT	ARK
1	14:53		--	--	CHAT	Casey Dick tackled in end zone for a safety by Brandon Golder	2	0
1	08:43		45	2:24	ARK	Darren McFadden 2-yard touchdown run, Alex Tejada kick good	2	7
1	01:40		82	2:33	ARK	Peyton Hillis 24-yard touchdown reception from Casey Dick, Alex Tejada kick good	2	14
2	07:28		59	2:44	CHAT	Brent Hayes 4-yard touchdown reception from Antonio Miller, Craig Camay kick good	9	14
2	00:38		26	0:54	ARK	47-yard field goal by Alex Tejada	9	17
3	03:54		65	0:47	ARK	Felix Jones 59-yard touchdown run, Alex Tejada kick good	9	24
3	01:49		65	0:20	CHAT	Bryan Fitzgerald 65-yard touchdown run, 2-point pass no good	15	24
4	13:43		68	3:06	ARK	Felix Jones 1-yard touchdown run, Alex Tejada kick good	15	31
4	10:39		5	1:26	ARK	32-yard field goal by Alex Tejada	15	34
"TOP" = time of possession. For other American football terms, see Glossary of American football.							15	34

=== Auburn ===
	1	2	3	4	Total
#25 Tigers	3	0	0	6	9
Razorbacks	0	0	0	7	7

Scoring summary

Quarter	Time	Drive			Team	Scoring information	Score	
Quarter	Time	Plays	Yards	TOP	Team	Scoring information	AUB	ARK
1	08:48		67	6:12	AUB	22-yard field goal by Wes Byrum	3	0
4	10:11		23	3:14	AUB	38-yard field goal by Wes Byrum	6	0
4	01:36		71	2:43	ARK	Lucas Miller 13-yard touchdown reception from Casey Dick, Alex Tejada kick good	6	7
4	00:21		50	1:15	AUB	20-yard field goal by Wes Byrum	9	7
"TOP" = time of possession. For other American football terms, see Glossary of American football.							9	7

=== Ole Miss ===
	1	2	3	4	Total
Razorbacks	14	7	7	16	44
Rebels	0	0	0	8	8

Scoring summary

Quarter	Time	Drive			Team	Scoring information	Score	
Quarter	Time	Plays	Yards	TOP	Team	Scoring information	ARK	MISS
1	08:49		68	1:00	ARK	Felix Jones 38-yard touchdown run, Alex Tejada kick good	7	0
1	03:49		64	3:46	ARK	Felix Jones 11-yard touchdown run, Alex Tejada kick good	14	0
2	14:04		25	2:13	ARK	Andrew Davie 1-yard touchdown reception from Casey Dick, Alex Tejada kick good	21	0
3	03:09		50	1:48	ARK	Peyton Hillis 9-yard touchdown reception from Casey Dick, Alex Tejada kick good	28	0
4	12:07		28	3:36	ARK	32-yard field goal by Alex Tejada	31	0
4	09:00		26	1:23	ARK	Andrew Davie 14-yard touchdown reception from Casey Dick, Alex Tejada kick no good	37	0
4	06:26		76	2:34	MISS	Mike Wallace 37-yard touchdown reception from Brent Schaeffer, 2-point pass good	37	8
4	06:00		49	0:26	ARK	Chris Baker 48-yard touchdown reception from Nathan Emert, Alex Tejada kick good	44	8
"TOP" = time of possession. For other American football terms, see Glossary of American football.							44	8

=== FIU ===
	1	2	3	4	Total
Golden Panthers	0	10	0	0	10
Razorbacks	10	21	10	17	58

Scoring summary

Quarter	Time	Drive			Team	Scoring information	Score	
Quarter	Time	Plays	Yards	TOP	Team	Scoring information	FIU	ARK
1	12:09		5	1:55	ARK	32-yard field goal by Alex Tejada	0	3
1	07:40		51	3:29	ARK	Darren McFadden 3-yard touchdown run, Alex Tejada kick good	0	10
2	14:39		32	2:32	ARK	Darren McFadden 1-yard touchdown run, Alex Tejada kick good	0	17
2	08:27		68	3:09	ARK	Darren McFadden 2-yard touchdown run, Alex Tejada kick good	0	24
2	05:04		83	3:23	FIU	Greg Ellingson 33-yard touchdown reception from Wayne Younger, Chris Abed kick good	7	24
2	01:42		68	3:02	ARK	Marcus Monk 13-yard touchdown reception from Nathan Emert, Alex Tejada kick good	7	31
2	00:00		54	1:42	FIU	35-yard field goal by Chris Abed	10	31
3	08:54		49	6:06	ARK	42-yard field goal by Alex Tejada	10	34
3	00:20		23	1:10	ARK	Felix Jones 16-yard touchdown run, Alex Tejada kick good	10	41
4	13:59		6	0:16	ARK	Darren McFadden 2-yard touchdown run, Alex Tejada kick good	10	48
4	05:29		26	1:51	ARK	20-yard field goal by Alex Tejada	10	51
4	00:49		81	0:16	ARK	Michael Smith 81-yard touchdown run, Alex Tejada kick good	10	58
"TOP" = time of possession. For other American football terms, see Glossary of American football.							10	58

=== South Carolina ===
	1	2	3	4	Total
#25 Gamecocks	3	7	17	9	36
Razorbacks	21	7	14	6	48

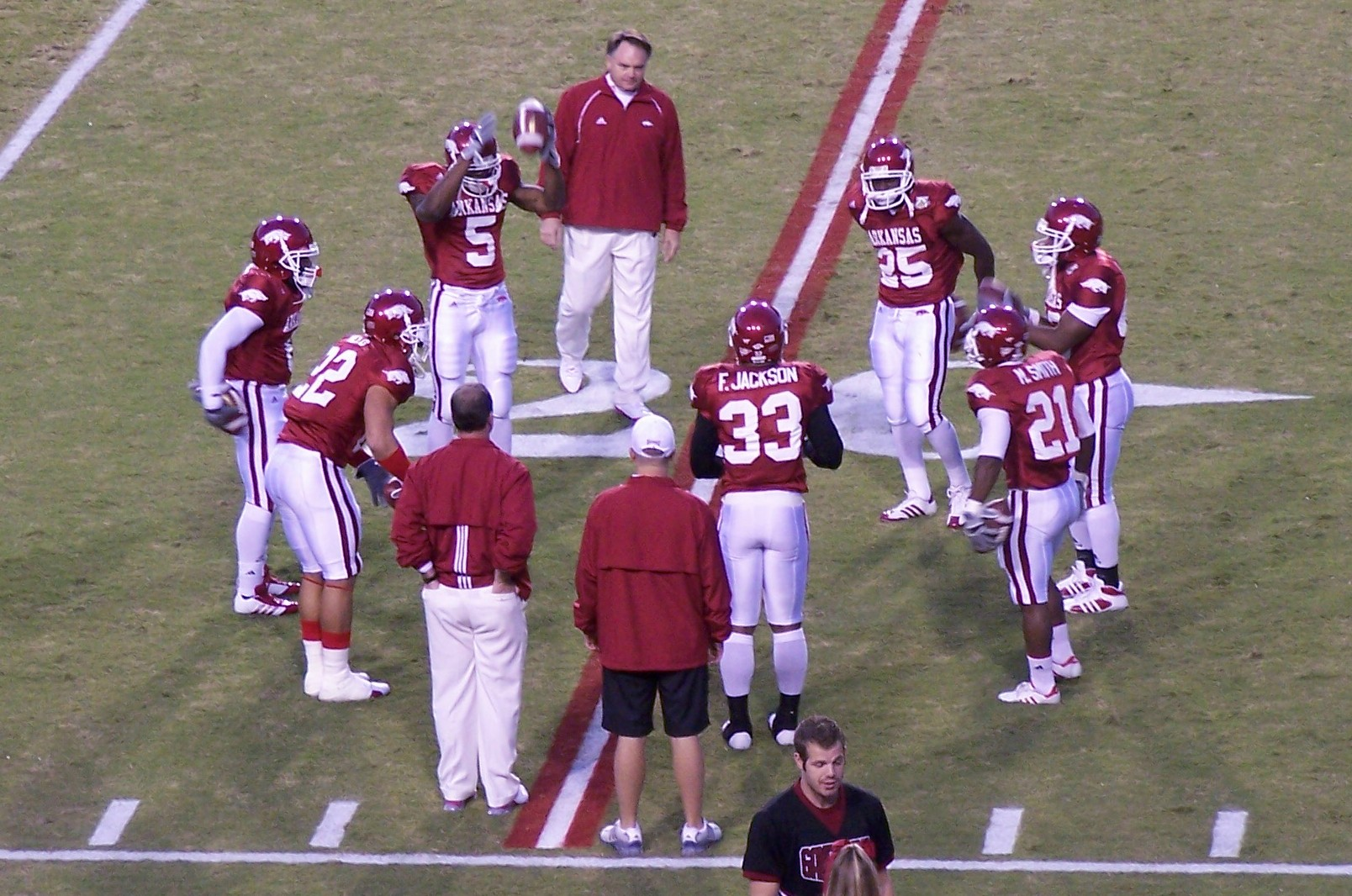
The Arkansas backs warming up before their contest with South Carolina.

Scoring summary

Quarter	Time	Drive			Team	Scoring information	Score	
Quarter	Time	Plays	Yards	TOP	Team	Scoring information	SCAR	ARK
1	11:44		67	3:16	ARK	Marcus Monk 4-yard touchdown reception from Casey Dick, Alex Tejada kick good	0	7
1	06:21		47	1:18	SCAR	37-yard field goal by Ryan Succop	3	7
1	04:42		63	1:39	ARK	Felix Jones 40-yard touchdown run, Alex Tejada kick good	3	14
1	02:52		76	0:48	ARK	Felix Jones 72-yard touchdown run, Alex Tejada kick good	3	21
1	08:05		76	3:47	SCAR	Blake Mitchell 1-yard touchdown run, Ryan Succop kick good	10	21
2	06:52		51	1:13	ARK	Lucas Miller 35-yard touchdown reception from Casey Dick, Alex Tejada kick good	10	28
3	11:11		60	3:49	SCAR	30-yard field goal by Ryan Succop	13	28
3	09:07		55	2:04	SCAR	Jared Cook 21-yard touchdown reception from Blake Mitchell, Ryan Succop kick good	20	28
3	05:13		67	3:54	ARK	Robert Johnson 23-yard touchdown reception from Darren McFadden, Alex Tejada kick good	20	35
3	04:29		36	0:44	SCAR	Dion Lecorn 22-yard touchdown reception from Blake Mitchell, Ryan Succop kick good	27	35
3	02:47		47	1:42	ARK	Felix Jones 7-yard touchdown run, Alex Tejada kick good	27	42
4	13:27		--	--	SCAR	Ball snapped over Darren McFadden through the end zone for a safety	29	42
4	08:15		55	5:12	SCAR	Cory Boyd 1-yard touchdown run, Ryan Succop kick good	36	42
4	08:04		80	0:11	ARK	Darren McFadden 80-yard touchdown run, 2-point pass no good	36	48
"TOP" = time of possession. For other American football terms, see Glossary of American football.							36	48

=== Tennessee ===
	1	2	3	4	Total
Razorbacks	3	0	3	7	13
#24 Volunteers	10	10	7	7	34

Scoring summary

Quarter	Time	Drive			Team	Scoring information	Score	
Quarter	Time	Plays	Yards	TOP	Team	Scoring information	ARK	TENN
1	10:15		64	4:45	TENN	Austin Rogers 16-yard touchdown reception from Erik Ainge, Daniel Lincoln kick good	0	7
1	08:01		20	2:04	ARK	31-yard field goal by Alex Tejada	3	7
1	04:58		7	2:48	TENN	25-yard field goal by Daniel Lincoln	3	10
2	08:23		47	7:15	TENN	28-yard field goal by Daniel Lincoln	3	13
2	00:10		49	1:00	TENN	Josh Briscoe 14-yard touchdown reception from Erik Ainge, Daniel Lincoln kick good	3	20
3	11:22		76	1:46	TENN	Arian Foster 59-yard touchdown run, Daniel Lincoln kick good	3	27
3	07:37		46	3:39	ARK	42-yard field goal by Alex Tejada	6	27
4	08:27		84	4:04	ARK	Michael Smith 9-yard touchdown run, Alex Tejada kick good	13	27
4	02:46		34	0:00	TENN	Interception returned 34 yards for touchdown by Jerod Mayo, Daniel Lincoln kick good	13	34
"TOP" = time of possession. For other American football terms, see Glossary of American football.							13	34

=== Mississippi State ===
	1	2	3	4	Total
Bulldogs	7	0	10	14	31
Razorbacks	0	24	7	14	45

Scoring summary

Quarter	Time	Drive			Team	Scoring information	Score	
Quarter	Time	Plays	Yards	TOP	Team	Scoring information	MSU	ARK
1	03:58		80	6:25	MSU	Jamayel Smith 4-yard touchdown reception from Wesley Carroll, Adam Carlson kick good	7	0
2	14:55		45	4:03	ARK	39-yard field goal by Alex Tejada	7	3
2	10:44		79	2:36	ARK	Farod Jackson 30-yard touchdown reception from Casey Dick, Alex Tejada kick good	7	10
2	05:01		35	0:08	ARK	Robert Johnson 35-yard touchdown reception from Casey Dick, Alex Tejada kick good	7	17
2	00:43		55	2:01	ARK	Marcus Monk 19-yard touchdown reception from Casey Dick, Alex Tejada kick good	7	24
3	10:20		60	2:58	MSU	25-yard field goal by Adam Carlson	10	24
3	09:33		67	0:47	ARK	Darren McFadden 57-yard touchdown reception from Casey Dick, Alex Tejada kick good	10	31
3	03:17		35	0:07	MSU	Tony Burks 35-yard touchdown reception from Wesley Carroll, Adam Carlson kick good	17	31
4	09:44		79	3:04	ARK	Robert Johnson 24-yard touchdown reception from Darren McFadden, Alex Tejada kick good	17	38
4	09:26		80	0:18	MSU	Jamayel Smith 80-yard touchdown reception from Wesley Carroll, Adam Carlson kick good	24	38
4	06:48		30	0:00	ARK	Interception returned 30 yards for touchdown by Antwain Robinson, Alex Tejada kick good	24	45
4	05:00		60	1:48	MSU	Jason Husband 19-yard touchdown reception from Wesley Carroll, Adam Carlson kick good	31	45
"TOP" = time of possession. For other American football terms, see Glossary of American football.							31	45

=== LSU ===
	1	2	3	4	OT	2OT	3OT	Total
Razorbacks	0	7	14	7	7	7	8	50
#1 Tigers	6	0	15	7	7	7	6	48

Scoring summary

Quarter	Time	Drive			Team	Scoring information	Score	
Quarter	Time	Plays	Yards	TOP	Team	Scoring information	ARK	LSU
1	13:19		11	1:35	LSU	32-yard field goal by Colt David	0	3
1	07:16		41	4:31	LSU	49-yard field goal by Colt David	0	6
2	07:33		97	3:23	ARK	Darren McFadden 16-yard touchdown run, Alex Tejada kick good	7	6
3	09:49		80	1:46	ARK	Darren McFadden 73-yard touchdown run, Alex Tejada kick good	14	6
3	07:48		51	1:52	LSU	Jacob Hester 12-yard touchdown run, 2-point run good	14	14
3	05:46		83	1:54	ARK	Peyton Hillis 65-yard touchdown run, Alex Tejada kick good	21	14
3	02:22		75	3:18	LSU	Demetrius Byrd 7-yard touchdown reception from Matt Flynn, Colt David kick good	21	21
4	05:06		72	2:24	ARK	Peyton Hillis 24-yard touchdown reception from Darren McFadden, Alex Tejada kick good	28	21
4	00:57		79	4:02	LSU	Demetrius Byrd 2-yard touchdown reception from Matt Flynn, Colt David kick good	28	28
OT1	15:00		25	0:00	LSU	Matt Flynn 12-yard touchdown run, Colt David kick good	28	35
OT1	15:00		25	0:00	ARK	Peyton Hillis 10-yard touchdown reception from Casey Dick, Alex Tejada kick good	35	35
OT2	15:00		25	0:00	ARK	Darren McFadden 9-yard touchdown run, Alex Tejada kick good	42	35
OT2	15:00		25	0:00	LSU	Jacob Hester 2-yard touchdown run, Colt David kick good	42	42
OT3	15:00		25	0:00	ARK	Peyton Hillis 3-yard touchdown run, 2-point run good	50	42
OT3	15:00		25	0:00	LSU	Brandon LaFell 9-yard touchdown reception from Matt Flynn, 2-point pass no good	50	48
"TOP" = time of possession. For other American football terms, see Glossary of American football.							50	48

=== Missouri—Cotton Bowl Classic ===
	1	2	3	4	Total
#24 Razorbacks	0	0	7	0	7
#7 Tigers	7	7	14	10	38

On December 2, Arkansas accepted an invitation to play in the Cotton Bowl Classic against the Missouri Tigers. The Razorbacks lost to Missouri, 38–7, and their all-time record in the Cotton Bowl Classic fell to 3–7–1.

Scoring summary

Quarter	Time	Drive			Team	Scoring information	Score	
Quarter	Time	Plays	Yards	TOP	Team	Scoring information	MIZZ	ARK
1	02:29		73	1:53	MIZZ	Tony Temple 22-yard touchdown run, Jeff Wolfert kick good	7	0
2	04:34		82	2:13	MIZZ	Tony Temple 4-yard touchdown run, Jeff Wolfert kick good	14	0
3	13:38		49	1:20	MIZZ	Tony Temple 4-yard touchdown run, Jeff Wolfert kick good	21	0
3	07:37		26	0:00	MIZZ	Interception returned 26 yards for touchdown by William Moore, Jeff Wolfert kick good	28	0
3	03:08		71	4:24	ARK	Darren McFadden 3-yard touchdown run, Alex Tejada kick good	28	7
4	10:25		-3	0:39	MIZZ	32-yard field goal by Jeff Wolfert	31	7
4	08:33		40	0:10	MIZZ	Tony Temple 40-yard touchdown run, Jeff Wolfert kick good	38	7
"TOP" = time of possession. For other American football terms, see Glossary of American football.							38	7

== Personnel ==
=== Coaching staff ===
2007 Arkansas Razorbacks coaching staff
Head coaches: Head coach – Houston Nutt ^{§}; Interim head coach – Reggie Herring ^{†}; Offensive coaches: Offensive coordinator – David Lee; Quarterbacks – David Lee; Running backs – Tim Horton; Wide receivers – Alex Wood; Tight ends – James Shibest; Offensive line/running game coordinator – Mike Markuson; Passing game coordinator – Alex Wood; Defensive coaches: Defensive coordinator – Reggie Herring; Defensive coordinator – Louis Campbell ^{†}; Linebackers – Reggie Herring; Linebackers – Pierre Brown ^{†}; Safeties – Chris Vaughn ^{§}; Safeties – Louis Campbell ^{†}; Cornerbacks – Bobby Allen; Defensive line – Tracy Rocker	Special teams coaches: Special teams specialist – James Shibest; Administrative staff: Athletic director (AD) – Frank Broyles; Assistant ad for internal operations – Louis Campbell; Strength & conditioning – Don Decker; Graduate assistant – Jeff Norrid; Graduate assistant – Courtney Sanders; Recruiting coordinator – Chris Vaughn ^{§}; Director of high school relations – Clifton Ealy; Director of athletic training – Dean Weber; Equipment manager – Tim Cheney^{§} Resigned before AT&T Cotton Bowl Classic ^{†} Promoted for AT&T Cotton Bowl Classic

=== Roster ===
2007 Arkansas Razorbacks roster
2007 Final Roster from ArkansasRazorbacks
Wide receivers: -- Nigel Chandler – (redshirt) Freshman; 1 Reggie Fish – Junior; 2 London Crawford – Sophomore; 4 Mike Rhim – Senior; 14 Joe Chaisson – Freshman; ~~15 Andrew Norman – (redshirt) Freshman~~; 18 Robert Johnson – Senior; 19 Carlton Salters – (redshirt) Freshman; 28 Chris Baker – Senior; 81 Marques Wade – (redshirt) Freshman; 84 Crosby Tuck – Freshman; 85 Marcus Monk – Senior; 87 John Aaron Rees – Junior; 88 Lucas Miller – Sophomore; 89 Brian Langford – Freshman; Tight ends: -- Blane Gibson – Sophomore; 45 D.J. Williams – Freshman; 80 Grant Freeman – Freshman; 80 Joseph Henry – Sophomore; 82 Andrew Davie – Sophomore; 83 Lance Thompson – Junior; 86 Ben Cleveland – Sophomore; 89 Jake Bequette – Freshman; Offensive line: -- Clay Bemberg – (redshirt) Freshman; -- Morris Carter – Freshman; -- Joel Scott – Freshman; 56 Colin Tucker – Sophomore; 58 Joey Crossland – Sophomore; 60 Seth Oxner – Freshman; 61 Robert Felton – Senior; 62 Michael Aguirre – Sophomore; 63 Jonathan Luigs – Junior; 64 Mike Moffitt – Senior; 64 Grant Cook – Freshman; 65 DeMarcus Love – (redshirt) Freshman; 66 Mitch Petrus – Junior; 70 Cody Standridge – (redshirt) Freshman; 71 Wade Grayson – Freshman; ~~72 Cody Green – Junior~~; 73 Ray Dominguez – (redshirt) Freshman; 74 Kareem Crowell – Freshman; 75 Nate Garner – Senior; 76 Jim Hart – (redshirt) Freshman; 78 Jose Valdez – Junior	Quarterbacks: -- Alex Mortensen – Junior; 4 Brian Reader – Freshman; 10 Nathan Dick – Freshman; 11 Casey Dick – Junior; 15 Clark Irwin- Sophomore; 16 Nathan Emert – Junior; 17 Austin Tucker – Freshman; Tailbacks: ~~-- Juwan Franklin – Freshman~~; ~~-- Michael Harris – Freshman~~; -- Cliff Moore – Freshman; 5 Darren McFadden – Junior; 6 Brandon Barnett – Sophomore; 20 Torian Wilkins – Freshman; 21 Michael Smith – Sophomore; 25 Felix Jones – Junior; Fullbacks: 9 Scott Bo – Freshman; 22 Peyton Hillis – Senior; 33 Farod Jackson – Senior; 38 Darcel Johnson – Freshman; 43 Robert Salinas – Sophomore; 43 Hezekiah Smith – Sophomore; Defensive backs: -- Seth Armbrust – Sophomore; -- Evan Bettis – (redshirt) Freshman; -- Darrell Glasper – Freshman; -- Ryan Jones – (redshirt) Freshman; ~~-- Sean Penix – Junior~~; -- Orion Runyan – Freshman; 2 Kenny Stockalper – Freshman; 3 Kevin Woods – Senior; 8 Michael Grant – Senior; 9 Matterral Richardson – Senior; 17 Shedrick Johnson – Junior; 20 Dallas Washington – Junior; 23 Greg Gatson – Freshman; 24 Isaac Madison – Freshman; 26 Ramon Broadway – (redshirt) Freshman; 27 Jerell Norton – Sophomore; 29 Jamar Love – Junior; 31 Matt Hewitt – Senior; 32 Bret Harris – Freshman; 35 Rashaad Johnson – Sophomore; 36 Walner Leandre – Junior; 39 Matt Harris – Sophomore	Linebackers: -- John Durmon – Sophomore; -- Daniel Meador – (redshirt) Freshman; -- Josh Minde – Freshman; 30 Weston Dacus – Senior; 34 Jerry Franklin – Freshman; 37 Jermaine Love – Freshman; 38 Elston Forte – Junior; 40 Tim Dial – Freshman; 41 Ryan Powers – Freshman; 42 Chip Gregory – (redshirt) Freshman; 44 Freddie Fairchild – Sophomore; 45 Aaron Fenton – (redshirt) Freshman; 46 Freddy Burton – Freshman; 47 Wendel Davis – Sophomore; 48 Desmond Williams – Junior; 49 Mark Bonner – Junior; Defensive line: -- Chris Berezansky – Sophomore; 53 Adrian Davis – Sophomore; ~~54 Adrian Campbell – Freshman~~; 55 Marcus Harrison – Senior; 57 Donnell Sanders – (redshirt) Freshman; 59 Van Stumon – (redshirt) Freshman; 89 Charles Alexander – Junior; 90 Ernest Mitchell – Junior; 91 Fred Bledsoe – Senior; 92 Brandon Lampkin – Freshman; 93 Marcus Shavers – Junior; 94 Chris Wade – Senior; 95 Patrick Jones – Freshman; 96 Malcolm Sheppard – Sophomore; 97 Antwain Robinson – Junior; 98 Cord Gray – Junior; 99 Damario Ambrose – Freshman; Punters: -- Cody Williams – Freshman; 4 Mitchell Smith – Sophomore; 50 Jeremy Davis – Junior; Kickers: ~~-- Joel Hall – Sophomore~~; -- Tyler Steelman – Sophomore; 7 Alex Tejada – Freshman; 52 Brian Vavra – Junior; Long snappers: 51 Rhett Richardson – Freshman; 53 Derrell Hartwick – Freshman; 56 Barrett Reynolds – (redshirt) Freshman

== Awards and honors ==
=== National awards ===
- Jonathan Luigs, center
  - Rimington Trophy
- Darren McFadden, running back
  - Doak Walker Award
  - Walter Camp Award
  - Heisman Trophy runner-up
  - Maxwell Award dinalist
- Felix Jones
  - Doak Walker Award semifinalist
- Farod Jackson, fullback
  - Draddy Trophy semifinalist

=== All-SEC ===
First team

- Jonathan Luigs, center
- Robert Felton, offensive lineman
- Darren McFadden, running back
- Felix Jones, kick returner

Second Team

- Nate Garner, offensive lineman
- Mitch Petrus, offensive lineman
- Marcus Harrison, defensive tackle
- Matt Hewitt, safety
- Michael Grant, defensive back
- RB Felix Jones

Freshman Team

- D. J. Williams, tight end
- Damario Ambrose, defensive lineman
- Freddy Burton, linebacker
- Alex Tejada, placekicker

== After the season ==
=== Coaching changes after the season ===
- Head coach Houston Nutt resigned from his position on November 26. With Nutt's resignation, the Razorbacks' defensive coordinator Reggie Herring was named the interim head coach for the Razorbacks' bowl game.
- Due to Herring becoming the interim head coach, Louis Campbell coordinated the defense and Pierre Brown coached the linebackers in the Razorbacks' bowl game.
- On December 11, former Louisville Cardinals and Atlanta Falcons coach Bobby Petrino was introduced as the new coach. However, Petrino handled recruiting for the Razorbacks for the 2008 season and did not coach the bowl game.
- Chris Vaughn resigned from his position to head to Ole Miss. Because of this, Louis Campbell also coached the safeties in their bowl game
