= Malcolm Shepherd =

Malcolm Shepherd may refer to:

- Malcolm Shepherd, 2nd Baron Shepherd (1918–2001), British Labour politician and peer
- Malcolm Shepherd (public servant) (1873–1960), senior Australian public servant

== See also ==
- Malcolm Sheppard (born 1988), American football player
