= Willy Robinson =

American football coach (born 1956)

Profile
- Position: Defensive back

Personal information
- Born: February 10, 1956 (age 70); Fort Carson, Colorado, U.S.

Career information
- High school: Redwood (Visalia)
- College: College of the Sequoias (1975–1976); Fresno State (1977–1978)

Career history
- Fresno State (1978) Graduate assistant; San Jose State (1979) Outside linebackers coach; Fresno State (1980-1986) Defensive backs coach; Fresno State (1987-1989) Outside linebackers coach Co-defensive coordinator (1988); Fresno State (1990-1991) Defensive backs coach & special teams; Fresno State (1992-1993) Defensive coordinator; Miami (FL) (1994) Defensive backs coach; Seattle Seahawks (1995–1998) Defensive backs coach; Oregon State (1999) Defensive coordinator & defensive backs coach; Pittsburgh Steelers (2000–2003) Defensive backs coach; San Francisco 49ers (2004) Defensive coordinator; New Orleans Saints (2005) Senior defensive assistant & secondary coach; St. Louis Rams (2006–2007) Defensive backs coach; Arkansas (2008–2011) Defensive coordinator & safeties coach

Awards and highlights
- First-team All-Pacific Coast (1977); Second-team All-Pacific Coast (1978)

Willy Robinson (born February 10, 1956) is an American football coach. He served as defensive coordinator under head coach Bobby Petrino at the University of Arkansas until he resigned December 6, 2011. Robinson spent twelve years as an assistant in the National Football League (NFL), including one season (2004) as defensive coordinator of the San Francisco 49ers.
