= Malcolm Sheppard =

American football player (born 1988)

No. 67, 96, 45
- Position: Defensive tackle

Personal information
- Born: February 13, 1988 (age 38); Augusta, Georgia, U.S.
- Listed height: 6 ft 2 in (1.88 m)
- Listed weight: 280 lb (127 kg)

Career information
- College: Arkansas
- NFL draft: 2010: undrafted

Career history
- Houston Texans (2010); Tennessee Titans (2010–2011); San Jose SaberCats (2013)

Awards and highlights
- 2× Second-team All-SEC (2008, 2009)

Career NFL statistics
- Total tackles: 13
- Stats at Pro Football Reference

Malcolm Sheppard (born February 13, 1988) is an American former professional football player who was a defensive tackle in the National Football League (NFL). He was signed by the Houston Texans as an undrafted free agent in 2010. He played college football for the Arkansas Razorbacks.

Sheppard also played for the Tennessee Titans.

== Early life ==
Sheppard attended Bainbridge High School in Bainbridge, Georgia.

== College career ==
Sheppard started the first four games at defensive tackle in 2007 for the Arkansas Razorbacks, but started for the last eight games of the season at his normal position of defensive end. He made 42 tackles, 0.5 sacks, and 10.5 tackles-for-loss in 2007. He moved from defensive end to defensive tackle in the 2008 offseason. Sheppard was named Razorbacks defensive player of the year in 2008 after he made 7.5 sacks, the most by a defensive lineman in the Southeastern Conference. He earned second-team preseason All-SEC honors following the 2008 season. In 2009, head coach Bobby Petrino named Sheppard a team captain.

== Professional career ==
=== Houston Texans ===
Sheppard was signed by the Houston Texans as an undrafted free agent following the 2010 NFL draft on May 7, 2010. He was waived during final cuts on September 3, but was re-signed to the team's practice squad on September 5. He was promoted to the active roster on October 25 to play in the week 8 game against the Indianapolis Colts, but was inactive for the following four weeks before he was waived on November 30. He was re-signed to the team's practice squad on December 7.

=== Tennessee Titans ===
Sheppard was signed off the Texans' practice squad by the Tennessee Titans on December 14, 2010.

=== San Jose SaberCats ===
Sheppard signed with the San Jose SaberCats of the Arena Football League on May 28, 2013.

== Personal life ==
Sheppard nearly lost his left eye when he was seven years old after his brother, Ricky, accidentally shot him with a wooden arrow. He now sees out of his right eye only due to the blurriness of the left.
