= 2008 Auburn Tigers football team =

American college football season

2008 Auburn Tigers football
- Conference: Southeastern Conference
- Western Division
- Record: 5–7 (2–6 SEC)
- Head coach: Tommy Tuberville (10th season)
- Offensive coordinator: Tony Franklin (1st season; first six games); Steve Ensminger (interim)
- Offensive scheme: Air raid
- Defensive coordinator: Paul Rhoads (1st season)
- Base defense: 4–3
- Home stadium: Jordan–Hare Stadium

2008 Southeastern Conference football standings
	Conf.			Overall
Team	W		L	W		L
Eastern Division
No. 1 Florida x$#	7	–	1	13	–	1
No. 13 Georgia	6	–	2	10	–	3
Vanderbilt	4	–	4	7	–	6
South Carolina	4	–	4	7	–	6
Tennessee	3	–	5	5	–	7
Kentucky	2	–	6	7	–	6
Western Division
No. 6 Alabama x%	8	–	0	12	–	2
No. 14 Ole Miss	5	–	3	9	–	4
LSU	3	–	5	8	–	5
Arkansas	2	–	6	5	–	7
Auburn	2	–	6	5	–	7
Mississippi State	2	–	6	4	–	8
Championship: Florida 31, Alabama 20
# – BCS National Champion; $ – BCS representative as conference champion; % – BCS at-large representative; x – Division champion/co-champions; Rankings from AP Poll

The 2008 Auburn Tigers football team represented Auburn University during 2008 NCAA Division I FBS football season. Tommy Tuberville served his tenth and final season as head coach at Auburn. He was joined by a new defensive coordinator Paul Rhoads and new offensive coordinator Tony Franklin, who attempted to implement Tuberville’s new offense without the proper players suited for the spread offense in a failed effort to correct the Tigers' offensive struggles in 2007. Tuberville fired Franklin six games into the season.

Auburn played a seven-game home schedule at Jordan–Hare Stadium, while traveling to Mountaineer Field in Morgantown, West Virginia for the Tigers' first ever meeting with the West Virginia Mountaineers. The Tennessee Volunteers returned to the Tigers' schedule for the first time since Auburn defeated Tennessee twice in AU's undefeated 2004 season. LSU, Arkansas, and Georgia rounded out Auburn's home conference schedule.

== Preseason ==
=== Rankings ===
The Tigers entered the season with high expectations, ranked highly by multiple polls in the preseason. The Associated Press Poll placed Auburn at #10 while the USA Today Coaches' Poll, a component of the Bowl Championship Series rankings, had Auburn at #11. Other rankings include:

# 7 – Rivals.com
# 8 – Athlon
# 9 – Sports Illustrated
# 9 – CollegeTop25 Consensus
# 10 – ESPN
# 13 – Lindy's
# 14 – CollegeFootballNews/Scout.com

=== Watchlists and honors ===
- Walter Camp Award watchlist – Sen'Derrick Marks(DT)
- Bronko Nagurski Trophy watchlist – Antonio Coleman(DE) and Sen'Derrick Marks
- Outland Trophy watchlist – Sen'Derrick Marks
- Dave Rimington Trophy watchlist – Jason Bosley(C)
- Playboy All-American – Sen'Derrick Marks

=== Preseason All-SEC Teams ===
Coaches All-SEC 1st Team – DT Sen'Derrick Marks & P Ryan Shoemaker
Coaches All-SEC 2nd Team – RB Ben Tate, OL Tyronne Green, LB Tray Blackmon & DB Jerraud Powers
Coaches All-SEC 3rd Team – DE Antonio Coleman

== Schedule ==
Auburn's schedule consisted of eight Southeastern Conference opponents (four home, four away) and four non-conference opponents. AU meets Tennessee-Martin and West Virginia for the first time. The WVU game, a mid-season inter-conference Thursday night matchup, is the first of a two-game home-and-home series between the two teams. Of the remaining ten opponents that the Tigers have previously faced, Auburn holds the all-time series lead against all but Alabama and LSU. Four opponents — #1 Georgia, LSU, West Virginia and Tennessee — were ranked in both the preseason USA Today and AP Polls. Alabama was also ranked in the AP Poll. Tennessee dropped out of the polls before playing Auburn; however, Vanderbilt would enter the polls by the time the Commodores played Auburn.

Date	Time	Opponent	Rank	Site	TV	Result	Attendance
August 30	6:00 pm	Louisiana–Monroe*	No. 10	Jordan–Hare Stadium; Auburn, AL	PPV	W 34–0	87,451
September 6	11:30 am	Southern Miss*	No. 9	Jordan–Hare Stadium; Auburn, AL	Raycom	W 27–13	87,451
September 13	6:00 pm	at Mississippi State	No. 9	Davis Wade Stadium; Starkville, MS	ESPN2	W 3–2	52,911
September 20	6:45 pm	No. 6 LSU	No. 10	Jordan–Hare Stadium; Auburn, AL (rivalry, College GameDay)	ESPN	L 21–26	87,451
September 27	2:30 pm	Tennessee	No. 15	Jordan–Hare Stadium; Auburn, AL (rivalry)	CBS	W 14–12	87,451
October 4	5:00 pm	at No. 19 Vanderbilt	No. 13	Vanderbilt Stadium; Nashville, TN (College GameDay)	ESPN	L 13–14	39,773
October 11	4:00 pm	Arkansas	No. 20	Jordan–Hare Stadium; Auburn, AL	PPV	L 22–25	85,782
October 23	6:30 pm	at West Virginia*		Milan Puskar Stadium; Morgantown, WV	ESPN	L 17–34	60,765
November 1	11:30 am	at Ole Miss		Vaught–Hemingway Stadium; Oxford, MS (rivalry)	Raycom	L 7–17	57,324
November 8	1:30 pm	UT Martin*^{†}		Jordan–Hare Stadium; Auburn, AL		W 37–20	85,365
November 15	11:30 am	No. 13 Georgia		Jordan–Hare Stadium; Auburn, AL (Deep South's Oldest Rivalry)	Raycom	L 13–17	87,451
November 29	2:30 pm	at No. 1 Alabama		Bryant–Denny Stadium; Tuscaloosa, AL (Iron Bowl)	CBS	L 0–36	92,138
*Non-conference game; ^{†}Homecoming; Rankings from AP Poll released prior to the game; All times are in Central time

== Game summaries ==
=== Louisiana–Monroe ===
	1	2	3	4	Total
Warhawks	0	0	0	0	0
No. 10 Tigers	14	3	10	7	34

Statistics	ULM	AUB
First downs	12	19
Total yards	220	406
Rushing yards	84	321
Passing yards	136	85
Turnovers	2	1
Time of possession	31:09	28:51

Team	Category	Player	Statistics
Louisiana–Monroe	Passing	Kinsmon Lancaster	20/38, 136 yards
Louisiana–Monroe	Rushing	Frank Goodin	15 rushes, 39 yards
Louisiana–Monroe	Receiving	Zeek Zacharie	8 receptions, 61 yards
Auburn	Passing	Chris Todd	9/18, 70 yards, TD, INT
Auburn	Rushing	Ben Tate	13 rushes, 115 yards
Auburn	Receiving	Rodgeriqus Smith	5 receptions, 57 yards

=== Southern Miss ===
	1	2	3	4	Total
Golden Eagles	0	0	6	7	13
No. 9 Tigers	0	14	10	3	27

Statistics	USM	AUB
First downs	20	22
Total yards	305	380
Rushing yards	37	132
Passing yards	268	248
Turnovers	3	4
Time of possession	29:40	30:20

Team	Category	Player	Statistics
Southern Miss	Passing	Austin Davis	33/50, 268 yards, 2 TD, 2 INT
Southern Miss	Rushing	Damion Fletcher	13 rushes, 29 yards
Southern Miss	Receiving	Shawn Nelson	12 receptions, 118 yards, 2 TD
Auburn	Passing	Chris Todd	21/31, 248 yards
Auburn	Rushing	Ben Tate	15 rushes, 71 yards, TD
Auburn	Receiving	Ben Tate	3 receptions, 51 yards

=== At Mississippi State ===
	1	2	3	4	Total
No. 9 Tigers	0	3	0	0	3
Bulldogs	0	0	0	2	2

Statistics	AUB	MSST
First downs	14	6
Total yards	315	116
Rushing yards	161	38
Passing yards	154	78
Turnovers	3	1
Time of possession	32:13	27:47

Team	Category	Player	Statistics
Auburn	Passing	Chris Todd	14/26, 154 yards
Auburn	Rushing	Ben Tate	20 rushes, 92 yards
Auburn	Receiving	Montez Billings	3 receptions, 68 yards
Mississippi State	Passing	Wesley Carroll	10/25, 78 yards, INT
Mississippi State	Rushing	Christian Ducre	16 rushes, 49 yards
Mississippi State	Receiving	Co-Eric Riley	3 receptions, 26 yards

=== No. 6 LSU ===
	1	2	3	4	Total
No. 6 LSU Tigers	3	0	14	9	26
No. 10 AUB Tigers	0	14	0	7	21

Statistics	LSU	AUB
First downs	20	16
Total yards	398	320
Rushing yards	178	70
Passing yards	220	250
Turnovers	1	2
Time of possession	31:00	29:00

Team	Category	Player	Statistics
LSU	Passing	Jarrett Lee	11/22, 182 yards, 2 TD, INT
LSU	Rushing	Charles Scott	21 rushes, 132 yards
LSU	Receiving	Brandon LaFell	4 receptions, 92 yards, TD
Auburn	Passing	Chris Todd	17/32, 250 yards, TD, 2 INT
Auburn	Rushing	Ben Tate	19 rushes, 45 yards, TD
Auburn	Receiving	Tim Hawthorne	2 receptions, 87 yards

=== Tennessee ===
	1	2	3	4	Total
Volunteers	0	6	0	6	12
No. 15 Tigers	7	7	0	0	14

Statistics	TENN	AUB
First downs	9	15
Total yards	191	226
Rushing yards	124	97
Passing yards	67	129
Turnovers	1	1
Time of possession	27:15	32:45

Team	Category	Player	Statistics
Tennessee	Passing	Jonathan Crompton	8/23, 67 yards
Tennessee	Rushing	Montario Hardesty	10 rushes, 35 yards, TD
Tennessee	Receiving	Austin Rogers	1 reception, 14 yards
Auburn	Passing	Chris Todd	14/23, 93 yards, TD, INT
Auburn	Rushing	Ben Tate	19 rushes, 70 yards
Auburn	Receiving	Robert Dunn	6 receptions, 54 yards, TD

=== At No. 19 Vanderbilt ===
	1	2	3	4	Total
No. 13 Tigers	13	0	0	0	13
No. 19 Commodores	0	7	7	0	14

Statistics	AUB	VAN
First downs	15	15
Total yards	208	263
Rushing yards	110	106
Passing yards	98	157
Turnovers	1	1
Time of possession	29:57	30:03

Team	Category	Player	Statistics
Auburn	Passing	Chris Todd	8/16, 70 yards, 2 TD, INT
Auburn	Rushing	Ben Tate	27 rushes, 108 yards
Auburn	Receiving	Mario Fannin	3 receptions, 56 yards, TD
Vanderbilt	Passing	Mackenzi Adams	13/23, 153 yards, 2 TD
Vanderbilt	Rushing	Mackenzi Adams	13 rushes, 54 yards
Vanderbilt	Receiving	Sean Walker	4 receptions, 66 yards

=== Arkansas ===
	1	2	3	4	Total
Razorbacks	3	7	6	9	25
No. 20 Tigers	7	6	7	2	22

Statistics	ARK	AUB
First downs	19	11
Total yards	416	193
Rushing yards	188	56
Passing yards	228	137
Turnovers	3	3
Time of possession	35:02	24:58

Team	Category	Player	Statistics
Arkansas	Passing	Casey Dick	17/32, 222 yards, 2 INT
Arkansas	Rushing	Michael Smith	35 rushes, 176 yards, TD
Arkansas	Receiving	Greg Childs	3 receptions, 61 yards
Auburn	Passing	Kodi Burns	7/18, 119 yards, 2 INT
Auburn	Rushing	Kodi Burns	15 rushes, 38 yards, TD
Auburn	Receiving	Tim Hawthorne	1 reception, 38 yards

=== At West Virginia ===
	1	2	3	4	Total
Tigers	3	14	0	0	17
Mountaineers	0	10	10	14	34

Statistics	AUB	WVU
First downs	16	25
Total yards	260	445
Rushing yards	149	271
Passing yards	111	174
Turnovers	1	2
Time of possession	35:19	24:41

Team	Category	Player	Statistics
Auburn	Passing	Kodi Burns	13/21, 111 yards, TD, INT
Auburn	Rushing	Kodi Burns	15 rushes, 82 yards, TD
Auburn	Receiving	Tommy Trott	4 receptions, 34 yards
West Virginia	Passing	Pat White	13/21, 174 yards, 3 TD, 2 INT
West Virginia	Rushing	Noel Devine	17 rushes, 207 yards, TD
West Virginia	Receiving	Alric Arnett	3 receptions, 59 yards, TD

=== At Ole Miss ===
	1	2	3	4	Total
Tigers	0	0	7	0	7
Rebels	0	10	0	7	17

Statistics	AUB	MISS
First downs	17	21
Total yards	394	373
Rushing yards	75	233
Passing yards	319	140
Turnovers	3	0
Time of possession	29:04	30:56

Team	Category	Player	Statistics
Auburn	Passing	Kodi Burns	27/43, 319 yards, 3 INT
Auburn	Rushing	Ben Tate	5 rushes, 35 yards, TD
Auburn	Receiving	Chris Slaughter	8 receptions, 131 yards
Ole Miss	Passing	Jevan Snead	15/30, 140 yards, 2 TD
Ole Miss	Rushing	Cordera Eason	14 rushes, 104 yards
Ole Miss	Receiving	Shay Hodge	6 receptions, 62 yards, TD

=== UT Martin ===
	1	2	3	4	Total
Skyhawks	7	6	7	0	20
Tigers	13	7	7	10	37

Statistics	UTM	AUB
First downs	16	26
Total yards	323	452
Rushing yards	38	290
Passing yards	285	162
Turnovers	3	3
Time of possession	25:13	34:47

Team	Category	Player	Statistics
UT Martin	Passing	Cade Thompson	27/46, 285 yards, 2 TD, 2 INT
UT Martin	Rushing	Brandyn Young	7 rushes, 19 yards
UT Martin	Receiving	Mike Hicks	12 receptions, 132 yards, 2 TD
Auburn	Passing	Kodi Burns	12/20, 130 yards
Auburn	Rushing	Kodi Burns	13 rushes, 158 yards, 2 TD
Auburn	Receiving	Tommy Trott	3 receptions, 39 yards

=== No. 13 Georgia ===
	1	2	3	4	Total
No. 13 Bulldogs	0	7	3	7	17
Tigers	6	0	0	7	13

Statistics	UGA	AUB
First downs	20	19
Total yards	351	303
Rushing yards	136	124
Passing yards	215	179
Turnovers	1	1
Time of possession	29:11	30:49

Team	Category	Player	Statistics
Georgia	Passing	Matthew Stafford	15/24, 215 yards, 2 TD
Georgia	Rushing	Knowshon Moreno	22 rushes, 131 yards
Georgia	Receiving	A. J. Green	5 receptions, 81 yards, TD
Auburn	Passing	Kodi Burns	16/30, 179 yards, TD
Auburn	Rushing	Mario Fannin	8 rushes, 59 yards, TD
Auburn	Receiving	Montez Billings	6 receptions, 66 yards

=== At No. 1 Alabama ===
	1	2	3	4	Total
Tigers	0	0	0	0	0
No. 1 Crimson Tide	3	7	19	7	36

Statistics	AUB	ALA
First downs	8	21
Total yards	170	412
Rushing yards	57	234
Passing yards	113	178
Turnovers	3	0
Time of possession	24:23	35:37

Team	Category	Player	Statistics
Auburn	Passing	Kodi Burns	9/23, 113 yards
Auburn	Rushing	Mario Fannin	8 rushes, 28 yards
Auburn	Receiving	Mario Fannin	3 receptions, 44 yards
Alabama	Passing	John Parker Wilson	8/16, 134 yards, TD
Alabama	Rushing	Glen Coffee	20 rushes, 144 yards, TD
Alabama	Receiving	Nikita Stover	1 reception, 39 yards, TD

== Coaching staff ==
Name	Position	Years at AU*	Alma mater (Year)	Note
Tommy Tuberville	Head coach	9	Southern Arkansas University (1976)	Resigned following the season. Replaced Mike Leach as Texas Tech head coach following 2009 season
Tony Franklin	Offensive coordinator, Quarterbacks	0	Murray State University (1979; M.S., 1989)	Fired after week 6 of the season
Hugh Nall	Offensive line	9	University of Georgia (1983)	
Eddie Gran	Running backs, Special teams	9	California Lutheran (1987)	
Steve Ensminger	Tight ends	5	Louisiana State University (1982)	Became Offensive Coordinator after week 6 of the season
Greg Knox	Wide receivers, Recruiting Coordinator	9	Northeastern State (1986), Northeastern State (1990)	
Paul Rhoads	Defensive coordinator, secondary	0	Missouri Western (1989), Utah State (1991)	Became Iowa State head coach following the season.
Don Dunn	Defensive tackles	9	East Tennessee State (1976), Union College (1980)	
Terry Price	Defensive ends	9	Texas A&M (1992)	Joined Rhoads at Iowa State initially, but was hired by Ole Miss before 2009 season began.
James Willis	Linebackers	2	Auburn University (2003)	

*Entering season

== Depth chart ==
Starters and backups.

Defense

FS
Mike McNeil
Jonathan Vickers
⋅

WLB	MLB	SLB
⋅	Tray Blackmon	⋅
Merrill Johnson	Josh Bynes	⋅
Courtney Harden	Adam Herring	⋅

SS
Zac Etheridge
Mike Slade
⋅

CB
Jerraud Powers
Ryan Williams
⋅

DE	DT	DT	DE
Michael Goggans	Sen'Derrick Marks	Jake Ricks	Antonio Coleman
A.J. Greene	Mike Blanc	Zach Clayton	Antoine Carter
Raven Gray	Darrell Roseman	Luke Farmer	⋅

CB
Aairon Savage
Walter McFadden
⋅

Offense

WR
James Swinton
Chris Slaughter
Charles Olatunji

WR
Robert Dunn
Terrell Zachery
⋅

LT	LG	C	RG	RT
Lee Ziemba	Tyronne Green	Jason Bosley	Chaz Ramsey	Ryan Pugh
Jared Cooper	Kyle Coulahan	Ryan Pugh	Byron Isom	Mike Berry
Andrew McCain	⋅	Bart Eddins	Bart Eddins	⋅

WR
Rodgeriqus Smith
Montez Billings
Quindarius Carr

WR
Tim Hawthorne
Mario Fannin
⋅

QB
Chris Todd
Kodi Burns
Neil Caudle

RB
Ben Tate
Brad Lester
Tristan Davis

Special teams
PK Wes Byrum
PK Morgan Hull
P Ryan Shoemaker
P Clinton Durst
KR Tristan Davis
PR Robert Dunn

== Rankings ==
Ranking movements Legend: ██ Increase in ranking ██ Decrease in ranking — = Not ranked
	Week															
Poll	Pre	1	2	3	4	5	6	7	8	9	10	11	12	13	14	Final
AP	10	9	9	10	15	13	20	—	—	—	—	—	—	—	—	—
Coaches	11	10	9	9	16	14	23	—	—	—	—	—	—	—	—	—
Harris	Not released					13	—	—	—	—	—	—	—	—	—	Not released
BCS	Not released							—	—	—	—	—	—	—	—	Not released

== Statistics ==
=== Team ===
	Team	Opp
Scoring	208	216
Points per game	17.3	18.0
First downs	198	204
Rushing	102	85
Passing	82	101
Penalty	14	18
Total offense	3635	3813
Total plays	810	777
Avg per play	4.5	4.9
Avg per game	302.9	317.8
Fumbles-Lost	23–13	20–7
Penalties-Yards	74–568	59–500
Avg per game	47.3	41.7

	Team	Opp
Punts-Yards	78-3212	81-3264
Avg per punt	41.2	40.3
Time of possession/Game	30:12	29:48
3rd down conversions	65/189	49/171
4th down conversions	5/12	8/17
Touchdowns scored	25	27
Field goals-Attempts	11–20	11–20
PAT-Attempts	23–25	19–22
Attendance	608,402	301,911
Games/Avg per Game	7/86,915	5/60,382

==== Scores by quarter ====
	1	2	3	4	Total
Auburn	63	68	41	36	208
Opponents	16	60	72	68	216

=== Offense ===
==== Rushing ====
Name	GP-GS	Att	Gain	Loss	Net	Avg	TD	Long	Avg/G
Ben Tate	12–2	159	718	54	664	4.2	3	49	55.3
Kodi Burns	10–7	98	532	121	411	4.2	5	58	41.1
Brad Lester	11–8	80	314	25	289	3.6	2	19	26.3
Mario Fannin	12–3	54	255	17	238	4.4	1	35	19.8
Eric Smith	12–1	21	98	15	83	4.0	0	19	6.9
Tristan Davis	10–4	8	44	0	44	5.5	1	13	4.4
Neil Caudle	2–0	1	4	0	4	4.0	0	4	2.0
Tim Hawthorne	12–1	1	3	0	3	3.0	0	3	0.2
Robert Dunn	12–4	3	6	7	−1	−0.3	0	6	−0.1
Montez Billings	11–11	2	0	7	−7	−3.5	0	0	−0.6
TEAM	7-	9	0	15	−15	−1.7	0	0	−2.1
Chris Todd	7–5	33	47	110	−63	−1.9	0	12	−9.0
Total	12	469	2021	371	1650	3.5	12	58	137.5
Opponents	12	408	1962	295	1667	4.1	7	63	138.9

==== Passing ====
Name	GP-GS	Effic	Cmp-Att-Int	Pct	Yds	TD	Lng	Avg/G
Kodi Burns	10–7	97.65	94–179–7	52.5	1050	2	52	105.0
Chris Todd	7–5	106.64	86–156–6	55.1	903	5	58	129.0
Neil Caudle	2–0	133.76	4–5–0	80.0	32	0	16	16.0
TEAM	7-	0.00	0–1–0	0.0	0	0	0	0.0
Robert Dunn	12–4	0.00	0-0-0	0.0	0	0	0	0.0
Total	12	102.01	184–341–13	54.0	1985	7	58	165.4
Opponents	12	113.81	199–369–11	53.9	2146	19	44	178.8

==== Receiving ====
Name	GP-GS	No.	Yds	Avg	TD	Long	Avg/G
R. Smith	12–9	30	332	11.1	1	33	27.7
Montez Billings	11–11	24	277	11.5	0	31	25.2
Mario Fannin	12–3	20	223	11.1	2	52	18.6
Tommy Trott	11–2	20	201	10.1	0	33	18.3
Robert Dunn	12–4	18	193	10.7	2	29	16.1
Chris Slaughter	8–1	15	179	11.9	1	42	22.4
Ben Tate	12–2	15	90	6.0	0	27	7.5
Tim Hawthorne	12–1	8	203	25.4	0	58	16.9
Brad Lester	11–8	7	37	5.3	1	16	3.4
Quindarius Carr	11–0	6	63	10.5	0	28	5.7
Derek Winter	8–0	4	27	6.8	0	11	3.4
Gabe McKenzie	12–1	3	33	11.0	0	21	2.8
Darvin Adams	10–0	3	18	6.0	0	9	1.8
Tristan Davis	10–4	2	42	21.0	0	22	4.2
Terrell Zachery	12–0	2	24	12.0	0	17	2.0
C. Olatunji	2–0	2	23	11.5	0	16	11.5
James Swinton	9–1	2	14	7.0	0	10	1.6
Eric Smith	12–1	2	3	1.5	0	2	0.2
John Douglas	3–1	1	3	3.0	0	3	1.0
Total	12	184	1985	10.8	7	58	165.4
Opponents	12	199	2146	10.8	19	44	178.8

=== Defense ===
Name	GP-GS	Tackles				Sacks	Pass defense			Fumbles		Blkd Kick	Saf
Name	GP-GS	Solo	Ast	Total	TFL-Yds	No-Yds	Int-Yds	BrUp	QBH	Rcv-Yds	FF	Blkd Kick	Saf
Jerraud Powers	2–2	9	5	14			1–0	1	1				
Antonio Coleman	2–2	6	5	11	3.0–15	2.0–13			3		1		
Merrill Johnson	2–2	5	4	9	1.0–6	1.0–6			1		1		
Neiko Thorpe	2–0	6	2	8				2			1		
Zac Etheridge	2–2	4	4	8			1–0						
Craig Stevens	2–2	5	2	7				1		1–6			
Chris Evans	2–0	3	4	7				3					
Josh Bynes	2–0	1	6	7									
Mike McNeil	2–2	2	4	6									
S. Marks	2–2	5	1	6	3.5–10				1				
Michael Goggans	2–2	5	1	6	1.0–2				1	1–9			
Tray Blackmon	2–2	3	2	5	1.0–2	1.0–2			1				
Courtney Harden	2–0		5	5				1					
Walter McFadden	2–2	4	1	5	1.0–5			1					
Mike Blanc	2–2	2	2	4	0.5–0								
D'Antoine Hood	2–0	2	2	4									
Gabe McKenzie	2–0	3	1	4									
Zach Clayton	2–0	3		3	3.0–10	1.0–6							
Mike Slade	2–0		3	3									
Tez Doolittle	2–0	2	1	3	1.0–4								
Drew Cole	2–0	1	2	3									
Antoine Carter	2–0	2	1	3					1				
Jake Ricks	2–0	1	1	2	1.0–4								
Darvin Adams	2–0	1	1	2									
Kodi Burns	2–1	1		1									
Spencer Pybus	1–0	1		1						1–0			
Eric Smith	2–1	1		1									
Robert Shiver	2–0	1		1									
R. Smith	2–1	1		1									
Total	2	80	60	140	16–58	5–27	2–0	9	9	3–15	3		
Opponents	2	84	64	148	10–31	2–8	2–17	5	13	3–0	4		

=== Special teams ===
Name	Punting								Kickoffs				
Name	No.	Yds	Avg	Long	TB	FC	I20	Blkd	No.	Yds	Avg	TB	OB
Clinton Durst	70	2947	42.1	58	4	22	18	1					
Ryan Shoemaker	7	248	35.4	51	0	1	2	0					
Wes Byrum									26	1681	64.7	1	3
Morgan Hull									22	1377	62.6	3	2
Total	78	3212	41.2	58	4	23	20	1	48	3058	63.7	4	5
Opponents	81	3264	40.3	59	7	24	25	0	50	3087	61.7	7	3

Name	Punt returns					Kick returns				
Name	No.	Yds	Avg	TD	Long	No.	Yds	Avg	TD	Long
Robert Dunn	7	171	24.4	1	66					
Marion Fannin						1	24	24.0	0	24
P. Pierre-Louis						1	18	18.0	0	18
Tristan Davis						1	14	14.0	0	14
Total	7	171	24.4	1	66	3	56	18.7	0	24
Opponents	4	17	4.2	0	9	10	212	21.2	0	30
