= Lorenzo Ward =

American football player and coach (born 1967)

Current position
- Title: Special assistant to the head coach
- Team: Clemson Tigers
- Conference: ACC

Biographical details
- Born: April 26, 1967 (age 59); Greensboro, Alabama, U.S.

Playing career
- 1986–1989: Alabama
- Positions: Strong safety, linebacker

Coaching career (HC unless noted)
- 1991: Alabama (GA)
- 1994–1998: Chattanooga (DB)
- 1999–2005: Virginia Tech (DB)
- 2006–2007: Oakland Raiders (ST/assistant DB)
- 2008: Arkansas (DB)
- 2009–2010: South Carolina (DB)
- 2011: South Carolina (CB)
- 2012–2015: South Carolina (DC)
- 2016: Fresno State (DC)
- 2017–2018: Louisville (AHC/DB)
- 2018: Louisville (interim HC)
- 2019–2023: Chattanooga (DC)
- 2024–present: Clemson (special assistant)

Head coaching record
- Overall: 0–2

Lorenzo Ward (born April 26, 1967) is an American college football coach who serves as a special assistant to the head coach for the Clemson Tigers. Ward served as the interim head football coach at the University of Louisville for the final two games of the 2018 season following the firing of Bobby Petrino. Ward played college football at the University of Alabama from 1986 to 1989.

== Playing career ==
Ward was born and raised in Greensboro, Alabama. A 1991 graduate of the University of Alabama, Ward played for the Crimson Tide from 1986 to 1989 under head coaches Ray Perkins (1986) and Bill Curry (1987-89).

== Coaching career ==
Ward's first job was at his alma mater as a graduate assistant during the Tide's 1991 season. Ward then worked for the University of Tennessee, Chattanooga from 1994 to 1998.

In 1999, Ward was hired by Frank Beamer to join Virginia Tech's coach staff. Here, Ward coached the secondary and had five all-Big East players and one all-ACC player, including DeAngelo Hall. During his last year, the Hokies led the nation in total defense, allowing just 247.6 yards per game.

Ward then joined the Oakland Raiders for the 2006 before rejoining the college ranks at Arkansas (2008) and then as defensive coordinator at South Carolina from 2012 to 2015 under Steve Spurrier.

Ward spent the 2016 season as the defensive coordinator at Fresno State before being hired by Louisville in 2017 as secondary coach.

On November 11, 2018, Louisville fired Bobby Petrino after the team's 2–8 start. Ward was named interim head coach and coached his first game in this role against N.C. State on November 17, 2018.

On June 4, 2019, the Chattanooga re-hired him to be the defensive coordinator.

On May 9, 2024, Clemson announced the hiring of Ward as the special assistant to the head coach for Dabo Swinney.

== Head coaching record ==
Year	Team	Overall	Conference	Standing	Bowl/playoffs
Louisville Cardinals (Atlantic Coast Conference) (2018)
2018	Louisville	0–2	0–1	7th (Atlantic)	
Louisville:		0–2	0–1		
Total:		0–2			
