= Tim Horton (American football) =

American football coach

Current position
- Title: Special teams coordinator and Running backs coach
- Team: Air Force Falcons
- Conference: Mountain West

Biographical details
- Born: Conway, Arkansas
- Education: University of Arkansas

Playing career
- 1986–1989: Arkansas
- Position: Wide receiver

Coaching career (HC unless noted)
- 1990–1992: Appalachian State (WR/TE)
- 1993–1998: Appalachian State (RB)
- 1999–2004: Air Force (WR)
- 2005: Air Force (RB)
- 2006: Kansas State (RB)
- 2007–2012: Arkansas (RB)
- 2013–2016: Auburn (RB)
- 2017–2018: Auburn (STC/RB)
- 2019–2020: Vanderbilt (RB)
- 2021–present: Air Force (STC/RB)

Tim Horton is an American football coach and former player. He is currently the special teams coordinator and running backs coach at the United States Air Force Academy. He has also had coaching stops at Appalachian State University, Kansas State University, the University of Arkansas, Auburn University, and Vanderbilt University.

== Playing career ==
Horton was a two time all-state running back in football and a two-time all-state sprinter in track & field while attending Conway High School in Conway, Arkansas. He was inducted to the Conway High School Wampus Cat Hall of Fame in 2019, and the Arkansas Sports Hall of Fame in 2021. He was offered a scholarship to play football for the Arkansas Razorbacks by then-head coach Ken Hatfield.

Horton played wide receiver and returned punts during his career at Arkansas from 1986 to 1989. He was a four time letter-winner, and three-year starter. As a senior, Horton was a team captain and earned second-team All-Southwest Conference honors. He helped lead the Razorbacks to four straight bowl appearances and back-to-back Southwest Conference titles in 1988 and 1989. Some of the biggest victories for Arkansas during Horton's time in Fayetteville included wins over the Texas Longhorns in Austin in 1986 and 1988, beating #7 Texas A&M in Little Rock in 1986, beating A&M in 1988 and 1989 to secure the SWC title, and beating Houston and Heisman Trophy winner Andre Ware in 1989.

== Coaching career ==
=== Appalachian State ===
Following Horton's playing career, he joined the coaching staff at Appalachian State. In his time with the Mountaineers, Horton helped guide the program to a 67–32 record during eight seasons, including Southern Conference championships in 1991 and 1995 and five NCAA Division I-AA playoff appearances. He coached the wide receivers and tight ends in his first three seasons, before transitioning to the running backs prior to the 1993 season.

=== Air Force (1st stint) ===
Horton was hired as the wide receivers coach at Air Force prior to the 1999 season. He held this position through the 2004 season, before switching over to running backs for the 2005 season. As a result of his work, Horton was recognized by the Fellowship of Christian Athletes Colorado chapter as one of its 2004 coaches of the year.

=== Kansas State ===
In 2006, Horton served as the running backs coach for the Kansas State Wildcats. He helped guide the team to a Texas Bowl appearance while mentoring future NFL running backs Thomas Clayton and James Johnson.

=== Arkansas ===
In the summer of 2007, Horton joined the staff at his alma mater, Arkansas, after initially rejoining the Air Force staff as offensive coordinator. While working for Houston Nutt at Arkansas, Horton coached the running backs and served as the recruiting coordinator. He was recognized by Rivals.com and ESPN.com as one of the nation's top recruiters. In 2007 he coached Darren McFadden to his second straight Doak Walker Award and his second straight runner-up finish for the Heisman Trophy. McFadden was also a 1st team All-American and was the SEC Offensive Player of the Year. McFadden finished his career as Arkansas' all-time leading rusher and most decorated player ever. Horton also coached McFadden's back-up RB and top return specialist Felix Jones to All-America honors in 2007, plus Horton coached starting fullback and future NFL player Peyton Hillis. After Nutt resigned following the 2007 season, Horton was retained by new Arkansas head coach Bobby Petrino. Horton would coach some of the best running backs Arkansas has ever had, to include Dennis Johnson, Michael Smith, Jonathan Williams and Knile Davis, all of whom earned all-SEC honors. After Petrino was fired in April 2012, Horton stayed on under interim head coach John L. Smith, but was not retained by new head coach Bret Bielema when he was hired following the 2012 season.

=== Auburn ===
From 2013 through 2016, Horton coached the running backs for Gus Malzahn and the Auburn Tigers football team. He also served as the recruiting coordinator in 2015-2016 before being promoted to special teams coordinator for the 2017 season.

Horton helped develop four running backs that led the SEC in rushing: Tre Mason (2013), Cameron Artis-Payne (2014), Kamryn Pettway (2016), and Kerryon Johnson (2017). Mason and Johnson both earned SEC offensive player of the year honors, and Mason was a Heisman Trophy finalist.

As the special teams coordinator, Horton coached kicker Daniel Carlson, who was the SEC's special teams player of the year. Horton became the only assistant in league history to coach the SEC offensive and special teams players of the year in the same season.

=== Vanderbilt ===
Horton spent two years (2019 – 2020) as the running backs coach for Derek Mason at Vanderbilt. He coached future NFL running back Ke'Shawn Vaughn.

=== Air Force (2nd stint) ===
Following the dismissal of the Vanderbilt staff, Horton returned to Air Force as the special teams coordinator and running backs coach in January 2021.

== Personal life ==
Horton's father, Harold Horton is a former Razorback player and assistant coach, and won two NAIA national championships (1984, 1985) as the head coach at Central Arkansas from 1982 to 1989. He also served as an administrator for the Razorback Foundation.

Tim Horton and his wife, Lauren, are the parents of a daughter, Caroline, and a son, Jackson. He earned his bachelor's degree in marketing management.

Horton authored a book titled, Complete Running Back.
