= Matterral Richardson =

American gridiron football player (born 1985)

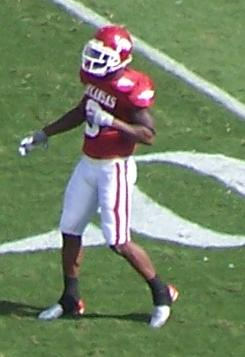
- Richardson with the Arkansas Razorbacks in 2006.

No. 27, 23
- Position: Cornerback

Personal information
- Born: June 30, 1985 (age 41); Marlin, Texas, U.S.
- Listed height: 6 ft 0 in (1.83 m)
- Listed weight: 197 lb (89 kg)

Career information
- College: Arkansas
- NFL draft: 2008: undrafted

Career history
- Washington Redskins (2008)*; Houston Texans (2008); New York Sentinels (2009); Cleveland Browns (2009–2010)*; Toronto Argonauts (2011)*
- * Offseason or practice squad member only

Matterral Richardson (born June 30, 1985) is an American former football cornerback. He was signed by the Washington Redskins as an undrafted free agent in 2008. He played college football for the Arkansas Razorbacks.

Richardson has also played for the Houston Texans, New York Sentinels, Cleveland Browns and Toronto Argonauts.

== Professional career ==
Pre-draft measurables
Height	Weight	Arm length	Hand span	40-yard dash	10-yard split	20-yard split	20-yard shuttle	Three-cone drill	Vertical jump	Broad jump	Bench press
5 ft 11 in (1.80 m)	194 lb (88 kg)	31 1/4 in (0.79 m)	8 1/2 in (0.22 m)	4.49 s	1.57 s	2.60 s	4.36 s	7.01 s	36.0 in (0.91 m)	10 ft 2 in (3.10 m)	14 reps
All values from NFL Combine

=== Washington Redskins ===
In his first ever preseason game with the Redskins, the Pro Football Hall of Fame Game, Richardson intercepted a ball thrown by Indianapolis Colts quarterback Jared Lorenzen and returned it for a touchdown.

=== Houston Texans ===
Richardson was signed off the Washington Redskins' practice squad by the Houston Texans on November 26, 2008 after running back Ahman Green was placed on injured reserve.

=== New York Sentinels ===
In 2009, Richardson signed with the New York Sentinels of the United Football League. He was later released by the Sentinels.

=== Cleveland Browns ===
Shortly after his release from the Sentinels, Richardson returned to the NFL and signed with the Cleveland Browns, remaining with the team for the duration of the 2009 NFL season. In 2010, Richardson was released by the team as a final training camp cut.

=== Toronto Argonauts ===
On February 4, 2011, Richardson signed with the Toronto Argonauts of the Canadian Football League. He was released on June 1, 2011.
