= Casey Dick =

American football player (born 1986)

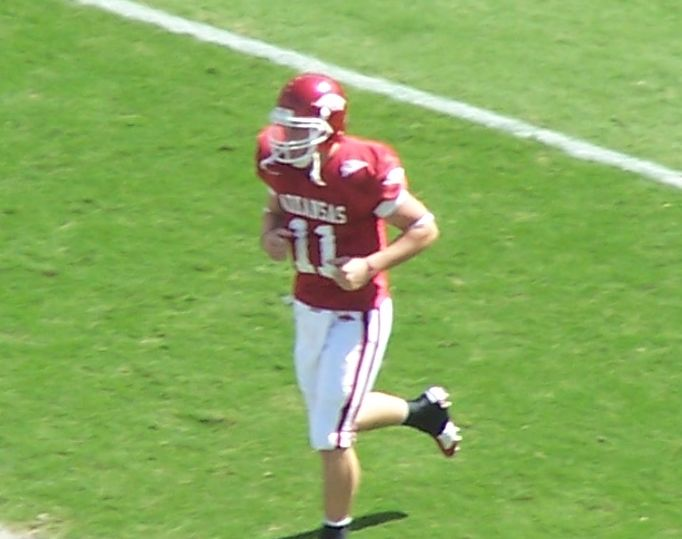
- Dick with the Arkansas Razorbacks in 2006

No. 11
- Position: Quarterback

Personal information
- Born: June 27, 1986 (age 40); Lucas, Texas, U.S.
- Listed height: 6 ft 2 in (1.88 m)
- Listed weight: 216 lb (98 kg)

Career information
- High school: Allen (Allen, Texas)
- College: Arkansas Razorbacks (2005–2008)

Casey Dick (born June 27, 1986) is an American former college football quarterback for the University of Arkansas. He is currently head coach at Rockwall-Heath High School.

== Early life ==
Dick played for Allen High School in Allen, Texas, United States. As a senior in 2004, he threw for 1,942 yards and 14 touchdowns, while adding 401 yards and 8 touchdowns rushing.

== College career ==
Dick committed to the University of Arkansas during the 2005 recruiting season. He was a 3-star rated prospect by Rivals.com recruiting analysts, heading a small group of 2005 quality QBs in Texas, alongside Chase Daniel and Colt McCoy.

=== Freshman season ===
Dick practiced as the 3rd team quarterback/scout team quarterback for the majority of the 2005 season, anticipating being redshirted for the season. His first playing time came during that same season in which he started off the bench over then-starter Robert Johnson for the game against South Carolina. Dick played well against South Carolina, Ole Miss, and third-ranked LSU and finished the season as the starting quarterback for the Razorbacks.

=== Sophomore season ===
Dick sustained an injury during summer practices, prompting coaches to again start Johnson against Southern California. He eventually played in the 2006 season, and replaced Mitch Mustain as the starter when Mustain was benched after leading Arkansas on an 8–0 streak. Dick led Arkansas to a loss against the eventual NCAA National Champion Florida Gators in the 2006 SEC Championship Game. Dick started in Arkansas' Capital One Bowl loss against Wisconsin, trading time with Mustain.

=== Junior season ===
The 2007 football season was Dick's junior season. Pursuant to Mustain's transfer to USC, he had no "real" competition for the quarterback position. Some fans were critical of Dick after he threw untimely interceptions in conference losses against Kentucky (2), Auburn (1), and Tennessee (2), but he held his starting job despite a brief run from backup Nathan Emert. On Nov. 17 in a home game against Mississippi State, he threw a career-high four touchdown passes and completed 14-of-17 attempts for 199 yards, earning him his first SEC Player of the Week honors. On Nov. 23, Dick led Arkansas to a 50–48 win over top-ranked LSU, in which he made key passes to Peyton Hillis on a fourth-and-10 in the second overtime to extend the game, and again for a 12-yard touchdown to tie.

Dick ended the season in third place in Arkansas school history for touchdown passes with 35, behind Matt Jones with 53 and Clint Stoerner with 57. He finished the year fourth in the SEC with a QB rating of 129.67.

=== Senior season ===
Dick entered his senior season under new head coach Bobby Petrino with the inside track on the starting job. A limited amount of competition was expected from redshirt freshman Nathan Dick, Casey's brother, and incoming freshman Tyler Wilson, a Rivals.com four-star prospect. Michigan transfer Ryan Mallett was on campus, but his formal request to waive the mandatory redshirt year when transferring was denied by the NCAA. Dick won the starter's job due to being an experienced senior with 21 starts at Arkansas quarterback prior to 2008.

Dick began the 2008 season with two consecutive 300-yard performances, the first of his career, and the first time in history that an Arkansas quarterback had thrown for 300 yards in back-to-back outings. After the first two games, Arkansas faced stronger competition, and Dick's output gradually suffered until he hit a statistical bottom of 94 passing yards against Kentucky in a narrow loss. Dick bounced back from his poor performance with a 284-yard, 2-touchdown game against Ole Miss, which he followed up with a 385-yard showing in a victory over 19th-ranked Tulsa, which included an early touchdown to take the lead. Dick's 385 yards were the second-highest total in school history, trailing Clint Stoerner's record of 387 against LSU in 1997 by two yards. For his performance, Dick was elected SEC Offensive Player of the Week.

In his final game, Dick came off the bench to replace his injured brother Nathan and threw two touchdowns, including a fourth-down throw to receiver London Crawford with 22 seconds remaining, and led Arkansas 31–30 over LSU. The play was reminiscent of the "Miracle on Markham", Matt Jones's game-winning TD throw to beat LSU in 2002, which was roughly the same distance in yardage and was to the same corner of the same end zone. Dick's touchdown, the last pass of his career, would go on to be voted by fans as a finalist for the Pontiac Gamechanging Performance, a title awarded to the most outstanding play of the year in college football. ESPN.com's Chris Low selected Dick's pass to Crawford as one of the top 15 plays in the SEC for the 2008 season, and selected the Razorbacks' win over LSU as one of the 10 best games in the SEC that season.

== Professional career ==
Dick was not selected in the 2009 NFL draft, but attended a minicamp with the New York Jets, lasting until the final cut. Dick also attended Pro Day with his former Razorback teammates prior to the 2010 NFL draft. He was eventually offered a tryout by the Miami Dolphins as a free agent on April 26, 2010 to throw at rookie camp.
