= Bobby Petrino =

American football player and coach (born 1961)

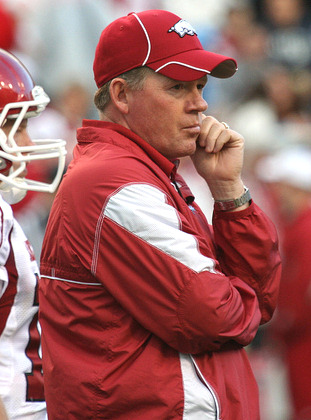
- Petrino during Arkansas's spring game in 2010

Current position
- Title: Offensive coordinator
- Team: North Carolina
- Conference: ACC

Biographical details
- Born: March 10, 1961 (age 65); Lewistown, Montana, U.S.

Playing career
- 1980–1982: Carroll (MT)
- Position: Quarterback

Coaching career (HC unless noted)
- 1983: Carroll (MT) (A)
- 1984: Weber State (GA)
- 1985–1986: Carroll (MT) (OC)
- 1987–1988: Weber State (WR/TE)
- 1989: Idaho (QB)
- 1990–1991: Idaho (OC)
- 1992–1993: Arizona State (QB)
- 1994: Nevada (OC/QB)
- 1995–1997: Utah State (OC)
- 1998: Louisville (OC/QB)
- 1999–2000: Jacksonville Jaguars (QB)
- 2001: Jacksonville Jaguars (OC)
- 2002: Auburn (OC)
- 2003–2006: Louisville
- 2007: Atlanta Falcons
- 2008–2011: Arkansas
- 2013: Western Kentucky
- 2014–2018: Louisville
- 2020–2022: Missouri State
- 2023: Texas A&M (OC/QB)
- 2024–2025: Arkansas (OC/QB)
- 2025: Arkansas (interim HC)
- 2026–present: North Carolina (OC)

Head coaching record
- Overall: 137–78 (college); 3–10 (NFL)
- Bowls: 5–6
- Tournaments: 0–2 (NCAA D-I playoffs)

Accomplishments and honors

Championships
- 1 C-USA (2004); 1 Big East (2006); 1 MVFC (2020); 1 ACC Atlantic Division (2016)

Awards
- C-USA Coach of the Year (2004); MVFC Coach of the Year (2020)

Robert Patrick Petrino (born March 10, 1961) is an American college football coach who is the offensive coordinator for the North Carolina Tar Heels. Petrino previously served as the head coach of the Louisville Cardinals from 2003 to 2006 and 2014 to 2018, the Arkansas Razorbacks from 2008 to 2011, the Western Kentucky Hilltoppers in 2013, and the Missouri State Bears from 2020 to 2022. He was also the head coach for the Atlanta Falcons of the National Football League (NFL) in 2007.

Petrino has directed his college teams to nine bowl games, including the first Bowl Championship Series (BCS) bowl games for both Louisville and Arkansas in their programs' histories. His teams have achieved four 10-win seasons and six AP Top 25 finishes.

== Early years ==
Born in Lewistown, Montana, Robert Patrick Petrino grew up in Helena and graduated from Capital High in 1979. He attended hometown Carroll College and graduated with a physical education and a math minor in 1983. While at Carroll, he played quarterback for the Fighting Saints and began his coaching career there as a graduate assistant during the 1983 season. At the time, his father Bob Petrino Sr. was the head coach of Carroll, a position he held from 1971 to 1999.

== Assistant coaching career ==
=== Carroll and Weber State ===
After a year at Carroll, he moved to Weber State College in the Big Sky Conference, coaching quarterbacks as a graduate assistant under head coach Mike Price. Petrino returned to his alma mater in 1985 as offensive coordinator. In each of his two seasons in that position, Carroll had the top-rated offense in NAIA football. He then returned to Weber State for two seasons in 1987 and 1988 as the receivers coach under Price.

=== Idaho and Arizona State ===
Petrino spent a year as quarterbacks coach at the University of Idaho in 1989 under new head coach John L. Smith, then was promoted to offensive coordinator the next season. In 1992, he moved up to Division I-A (now FBS) as the quarterbacks coach at Arizona State University in the Pac-10 Conference. During his two seasons at ASU under head coach Bruce Snyder, he oversaw the development of future All-American QB Jake Plummer, who went on to play ten seasons in the NFL.

=== Nevada and Utah State ===
In 1994, he moved to the University of Nevada, serving as both offensive coordinator and quarterbacks coach under Chris Ault. During his one season there, the Wolf Pack were second in the nation in both passing offense and total offense, and third in scoring offense. The next year, he began a three-year stint as offensive coordinator at Utah State University, reuniting with Smith.

=== Louisville ===
When Smith moved to Louisville in 1998, Petrino followed him there as offensive coordinator. In his one season there, the Cardinals were top-ranked in Division I-A in scoring and total offense and posted the biggest positive turnaround among I-A football teams, winning six more games than in the 1997 season. Petrino left the collegiate ranks to coach in the NFL for three years.

=== NFL ===
Petrino's first stint in the NFL was with the Jacksonville Jaguars from 1999 to 2001, where he spent two seasons as the quarterbacks coach and a third as offensive coordinator.

=== Auburn ===
In 2002, Petrino returned to the college ranks, replacing Noel Mazzone as offensive coordinator under Tommy Tuberville at Auburn, whose offense significantly improved that season under Petrino's watch.

== Head coaching career ==
=== Louisville ===
Petrino returned to Louisville in 2003 as head coach, replacing John L. Smith, who had departed for Michigan State. After only one season at Louisville, Petrino secretly interviewed for the coaching job at Auburn, as the Tigers were considering whether to retain his former boss, Tommy Tuberville.

In four years at Louisville, Petrino built the Cardinals into a national power. He led them to 11 wins in 2004 and 12 wins in 2006—only the second and third times that the Cardinals won as many as 11 games in a season, and to date their only appearances in the final top 10 of a major media poll. They spent much of 2006 as contenders for the national championship, rising as high as third in the nation before suffering their only loss of the season, against Rutgers. The 2006 team was invited to the Orange Bowl, only the second major-bowl appearance in school history.

On July 13, 2006, Petrino signed a 10-year, $25.6 million contract to stay on as head football coach. The deal gave Petrino a raise from $1 million to $1.6 million annually, and he would have been paid $2.6 million in the final year of the deal. The contract included a buyout clause of $1 million.

On January 7, 2007, less than six months after signing the 10-year contract above, it was announced Petrino had accepted the head coaching position for the NFL's Atlanta Falcons.

=== Atlanta Falcons ===
The Atlanta Falcons hired Petrino to a five-year, $24 million contract.

A major reason Petrino was brought in was to develop star quarterback Michael Vick into a more complete quarterback, Vick being known more for his ability to run than as a pocket passer. However, before Petrino's first training camp, it emerged that Vick had bankrolled an illegal dog fighting operation near his hometown in Newport News, Virginia. The terms of Vick's bail barred him from leaving Virginia before the November 26 trial, ending any realistic chance of him playing a meaningful down in 2007.

In a case of exceptionally bad timing, the Falcons had traded Vick's backup, Matt Schaub, to the Houston Texans in the offseason. Thus, Petrino was forced to begin the season with back-ups Joey Harrington, Byron Leftwich, and Chris Redman as his quarterbacks.

With their franchise quarterback effectively sidelined for the season, the Falcons appeared to be a rudderless team. On December 10, 2007, with the Falcons at the bottom of the NFC South with a 3–10 record after suffering a home loss to the division rival New Orleans Saints, Petrino resigned to become head coach at Arkansas, less than 24 hours after personally promising owner Arthur Blank that he was staying in Atlanta. Petrino informed his players of his departure via a four-sentence laminated note left at the locker of each player, a move that many in the organization and in the NFL harshly criticized. Even before resigning, Petrino had rankled the Falcons players with his aloof manner. He was known to walk through the locker room without speaking to the players. He was also reluctant to share personnel decisions with the players; Harrington learned through the media that Petrino considered Leftwich the starter even though Harrington had engineered two straight wins in Leftwich's absence.

According to a 2022 article in The Athletic about Petrino's tenure at Arkansas, Petrino told Jeff Long, who was due to formally succeed Frank Broyles as athletic director at Arkansas after the 2007 season, that he was interested in coming to Fayetteville. Long was not willing to wait until after the end of the NFL season, and asked Dallas Cowboys owner and Arkansas alumnus Jerry Jones to ask Blank for permission to negotiate with Petrino. When Blank turned the request down, Petrino's agent suggested that Long would be free to talk to Petrino if Petrino resigned from the Falcons during the season. Long met Petrino at a law office in Atlanta, and Petrino stepped away long enough to formally resign as Falcons head coach.

Petrino's thirteen game tenure is tied with Lou Holtz in 1976 and Urban Meyer in 2021 for the third shortest non-interim coaching tenure in NFL history. His tenure as the Falcons' head coach is widely considered to have been among the worst head coaching tenures in league history.

=== Arkansas ===
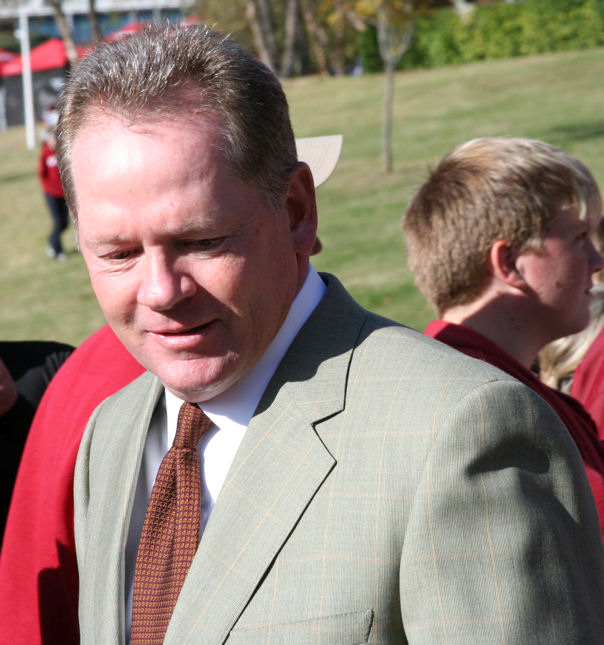
Petrino during the pre-game "Hog Walk" to the stadium in 2008

Once Petrino resigned from the Falcons, he and Long negotiated a contract calling for Petrino to be paid $2.85 million per year for five years; it was later extended to seven years before Petrino formally signed.

The Razorbacks ended the 2008 season with a record of 5–7 (2–6 in the SEC); The two conference wins were over Auburn, and a last second win against LSU in the annual Battle for the Golden Boot.

Under Petrino, the Razorbacks showed significant improvement in the 2009 season with analysts from both ESPN and CBS regularly citing starting quarterback Ryan Mallett as one of the most impressive collegiate quarterbacks in the country. The Razorbacks came close to upsetting the No. 1-ranked Florida Gators on October 17, 2009. That game culminated in a controversial fourth quarter personal foul call on an Arkansas lineman. The resulting 15-yard penalty allowed the Gators to continue what turned out to be their game-winning drive. The SEC ultimately issued an apology for the call and suspended the officiating crew. Arkansas would go on to finish the season 8–5 after beating the Conference-USA champion East Carolina Pirates in the 2010 Liberty Bowl, 20–17 in OT.

The Razorbacks also enjoyed success under Petrino in the 2010 season, finishing 10–2 and notching their first major bowl appearance in two decades, against Ohio State. In the 2011 Sugar Bowl, Ohio State built an early lead behind the play of Terrelle Pryor and Daniel Herron, but Arkansas came back in the second half. As the Razorbacks were driving for a go-ahead score in the final minutes, Ryan Mallett threw an interception near the Ohio State 20-yard line, and Ohio State ran out the clock. On July 8, 2011, under scrutiny from the NCAA due to a variety of program irregularities and violations of Ohio State University and NCAA policies, Ohio State vacated the 2011 Sugar Bowl win along with 11 other victories in their 2010 season. Arkansas was still forced to count the game as a loss, finishing 10–3.

The Razorbacks won the 2012 Cotton Bowl Classic in Dallas, defeating Kansas State by a score of 29–16. The Hogs concluded the 2011 season with an 11–2 record, with their only losses at Alabama and at LSU, both of whom played in the BCS national championship game. It was just the third 11-win season in Arkansas' 119-year football history, and their first since 1977. The Razorbacks also finished ranked #5 in both major polls, their first top-ten finish in 30 years.

==== Motorcycle incident and dismissal ====
On April 1, 2012, Petrino was involved in a motorcycle crash on Arkansas Highway 16 near the community of Crosses. He was riding with former Arkansas All-SEC volleyball player Jessica Dorrell, whom he had hired on March 28 as student-athlete development coordinator for the football program after she served as a fundraiser in the Razorback Foundation. Petrino initially said he was alone on the motorcycle. However, on April 6, just minutes before a police report was to be released showing Dorrell was also aboard, Petrino admitted that Dorrell was not only a passenger, but that he had been conducting an affair with her. Long placed Petrino on indefinite paid administrative leave while he investigated the situation.

According to The Athletic, shortly after the accident, Larry Henry of KFSM-TV got a tip from "a lock-down, high-up source" at the university that Petrino was not really alone on the motorcycle. This prompted Henry to collar Petrino after a press conference held after Petrino's release from the hospital and ask him if he was sure he was alone during the accident. Two days after the press conference, Henry learned the police report was about to be released, and that Dorrell was indeed the other passenger. The police investigation revealed that Petrino and Dorrell refused offers to call 911, then flagged down a passing car who drove them to a Fayetteville diner. A state trooper who served as Petrino's game-day police detail drove a badly injured Petrino to the hospital.

On April 10, Long announced that Petrino had been fired. During Long's investigation, it was discovered that Petrino and Dorrell's relationship was an open secret in the football office. Petrino frequently sent Dorrell gifts, including a previously undisclosed $20,000 cash gift as a Christmas present. Dorrell used the money to help buy a new car. It was also revealed that Dorrell may have received preferential treatment in her hiring on the football staff, as Petrino's relationship with Dorrell was not disclosed and Petrino was on the hiring committee. Long determined that Petrino's attempts to mislead both him and the public about the accident and his relationship with Dorrell were grounds to fire Petrino for cause. In his formal termination letter to Petrino, Long said that he would have never allowed Dorrell's hiring had Petrino disclosed his relationship with Dorrell, and concluded that this and other lies on Petrino's part were "contrary to the character and responsibilities" of his post, and "negatively and adversely affected the reputation of the University of Arkansas within the State of Arkansas and on a national level." Long also determined that the $20,000 payment could expose Arkansas to a sexual harassment suit if Petrino were retained.

In the course of hiring Dorrell, according to Sports Illustrated, Petrino also circumvented university affirmative action guidelines requiring job postings to be listed for 30 days before interviews could begin. He claimed that he needed an assistant to help him with recruiting right away, allowing him to interview and hire Dorrell 16 days after the job was posted. Dorrell was also the only candidate with no previous experience in a football program, and the only candidate without a master's degree.

Petrino was succeeded by his former boss, Smith, as interim head coach. Smith had been the Arkansas special teams coach before briefly taking the head coaching job at Weber State. On December 4, 2012, Bret Bielema was named Smith's successor.

==== Public apologies ====
In July, Petrino contacted Smith and members of his former team, including quarterback Tyler Wilson, who said the outreach provided "a little closure." Running back Knile Davis said, "He apologized. He said, 'I'm sorry for everything that happened.' ... He was very humble. He was very hurt. I told him not to be so hard on himself. I told him, 'You made a mistake. You'll get back from it.'" Smith's phone call with Petrino was "basically about our football team at Arkansas, of which he's always concerned about" [sic]

In August 2012, Petrino sat down for a video interview with ESPN college football reporter Joe Schad to express remorse and regret, saying there was "no justification" for his decisions.

On September 9, 2019, Petrino was the guest at the Little Rock Touchdown Club. During his interview session, Petrino explained to the sell-out crowd what happened that led to his termination in 2012. He also expressed profound remorse for his actions, and his deep admiration for the Arkansas Razorback football program, stating that he was a different person from the man who was fired seven years earlier. The gathered crowd gave Petrino a round of applause.

=== Western Kentucky ===
On December 10, 2012, Western Kentucky hired Petrino as their new head coach, replacing Willie Taggart, who had departed for South Florida. Petrino signed a four-year contract with a base salary of $850,000 annually. If Petrino left early, conditions of the contract required Petrino to re-pay the university $1.2 million in six monthly payments starting the month after he leaves.

In Petrino's only season at WKU, the Hilltoppers began with a second straight win over Kentucky and finished with an 8–4 record; however, they were not invited to a bowl game.

=== Return to Louisville ===
After Charlie Strong left Louisville for the University of Texas, Petrino was rumored as one of the candidates to become the next head coach, even after his departure in 2007. However, in early 2014, Eric Crawford of WDRB recalled that athletic director Tom Jurich had been somewhat critical of Petrino's tenure there. In a 2008 interview, Jurich told Crawford that Petrino's successor, Steve Kragthorpe, dismissed several players he'd inherited from Petrino for drug-related reasons. Due to drug problems and other disciplinary issues, Jurich said, some 21 of Petrino's players had been "cleared out" since 2007. As a result, by 2009 only three players from Petrino's last recruiting class were starting, and only seven were playing regularly. Jurich was also displeased that Petrino seemed to be more concerned with burnishing his resumé than building the program for the future.

On January 9, 2014, Petrino officially returned to Louisville at a press conference after being unanimously approved by the University of Louisville Athletic Association. Petrino reportedly signed a deal that was to pay $24.5 million over seven years with a buyout of $10 million.

The best years of Petrino's second tenure came from 2015 to 2017, with Lamar Jackson as quarterback. Jackson won the Heisman Trophy as a sophomore in 2016. In that same year, the Cardinals steamrolled then second-ranked Florida State 63–20, at the time the most points ever surrendered by a Florida State team.

However, the Cardinals regressed significantly in 2018, after Jackson gave up his senior year to enter the NFL Draft. Petrino led the Cardinals to a 2–8 record in 2018, which included a seven game losing streak and consecutive blowout losses to rival ACC teams Clemson and Syracuse. In those two routs, Louisville lost by a combined score of 131–39. Days after the loss to Syracuse, Louisville fired Petrino on November 11, 2018, agreeing to buy out the remaining $14.1 million of his contract. Athletic director Vince Tyra said that he did not believe the players were responding under Petrino, and felt he needed to make an immediate change to start the turnaround. Secondary coach Lorenzo Ward was named interim head coach for the rest of the season.

In a postmortem, ESPN's Andrea Adelson wrote that Jackson's presence masked serious deficiencies in the Louisville program that were exposed in full in 2018. For example, during his Heisman season of 2016, Jackson was sacked 47 times. During the 2018 season, the running game was suspect, and the defense was on its third coordinator in as many seasons. Crawford, who has covered the Cardinals for almost three decades at both WDRB and The Courier-Journal, recalled that the 2018 season, and with it Petrino's tenure, effectively ended when Petrino ripped into his players in the locker room following a close loss to Florida State. According to Crawford, Petrino lost the team at that point; they would not win another game that season.

=== Missouri State ===
On January 15, 2020, Missouri State University, of the Missouri Valley Football Conference (MVFC) in the FCS, announced that they had hired Petrino to replace Dave Steckel as their head football coach. In Petrino's first season with Missouri State, the Bears compiled a 5–4 record and were selected to compete in the FCS playoffs for the first time since 1990. However, the Bears lost their first-round matchup with the University of North Dakota by a score of 44–10.

Petrino's second season with Missouri State was also successful; he led the Bears to an 8–3 record in the regular season and a berth in the FCS Playoffs with a first-round matchup against UT-Martin. They lost a close matchup, 32–31.

In 2022, Petrino's final season at Missouri State, the team regressed to post a 5–6 record, which included a 5-game losing streak that started with a loss to Petrino's former team, Arkansas, in Fayetteville (No. 10 ranked Arkansas won 38–27).

== Return to assistant coaching ==
=== UNLV ===
On December 15, 2022, Petrino joined the UNLV Rebels under Barry Odom as the offensive coordinator. This position was short lived, as Petrino departed 21 days later on January 4, 2023, for Texas A&M.

=== Texas A&M ===
Petrino's tenure as the offensive coordinator for Texas A&M lasted one season, as he was not retained by new head coach Mike Elko.

=== Return to Arkansas ===
On November 29, 2023, Petrino returned to Arkansas under Sam Pittman to be offensive coordinator, 11 years after being fired as head coach. On September 28, 2025, after the firing of Pittman as head coach, Petrino was appointed interim head coach for the remainder of the season. Petrino was not retained as the Arkansas coach after the season, after it was announced that the school had hired Ryan Silverfield away from the Memphis Tigers to be their new head coach.

=== North Carolina ===
On January 9, 2026, Petrino was hired by the North Carolina Tar Heels under Bill Belichick to be offensive coordinator.

== Personal life ==
Petrino has two sons and two daughters with his wife Becky. His older daughter Kelsey graduated from the University of Louisville, and his older son Nick also attended Louisville. His younger son Bobby Jr. attended the University of Arkansas, and his younger daughter Katie played on Louisville's golf team. He also has five grandchildren.

Petrino's younger brother Paul is a senior offensive assistant at Louisville, and has worked with Bobby on several occasions.

== Head coaching record ==
=== College ===
Year	Team	Overall	Conference	Standing	Bowl/playoffs	Coaches^{#}	AP/STATS^{°}
Louisville Cardinals (Conference USA) (2003–2004)
2003	Louisville	9–4	5–3	T–3rd	L GMAC		
2004	Louisville	11–1	8–0	1st	W Liberty	7	6
Louisville Cardinals (Big East Conference) (2005–2006)
2005	Louisville	9–3	5–2	2nd	L Gator	20	19
2006	Louisville	12–1	6–1	1st	W Orange^{†}	7	6
Arkansas Razorbacks (Southeastern Conference) (2008–2011)
2008	Arkansas	5–7	2–6	T–4th (Western)			
2009	Arkansas	8–5	3–5	T–4th (Western)	W Liberty		
2010	Arkansas	10–3	6–2	T–2nd (Western)	L Sugar^{†}	12	12
2011	Arkansas	11–2	6–2	3rd (Western)	W Cotton	5	5
Western Kentucky Hilltoppers (Sun Belt Conference) (2013)
2013	Western Kentucky	8–4	4–3	T–3rd			
Western Kentucky:		8–4	4–3				
Louisville Cardinals (Atlantic Coast Conference) (2014–2018)
2014	Louisville	9–4	5–3	3rd (Atlantic)	L Belk	24	24
2015	Louisville	8–5	5–3	3rd (Atlantic)	W Music City		
2016	Louisville	9–4	7–1	T–1st (Atlantic)	L Citrus	20	21
2017	Louisville	8–5	4–4	T–3rd (Atlantic)	L TaxSlayer		
2018	Louisville	2–8	0–7	7th (Atlantic)			
Louisville:		77–35	45–24				
Missouri State Bears (Missouri Valley Football Conference) (2020–2022)
2020–21	Missouri State	5–5	5–1	T–1st	L NCAA Division I First Round	13	13
2021	Missouri State	8–4	6–2	2nd	L NCAA Division I First Round	14	14
2022	Missouri State	5–6	3–5	8th			
Missouri State:		18–15	14–8				
Arkansas Razorbacks (Southeastern Conference) (2025)
2025	Arkansas	0–7	0–7	16th			
Arkansas:		34–24	17–22				
Total:		137–78					
National championship Conference title Conference division title or championship game berth
^{†}Indicates Bowl Coalition, Bowl Alliance, BCS, or CFP / New Years' Six bowl.; ^{#}Rankings from final Coaches Poll.; ^{°}Rankings from final AP Poll.

=== NFL ===
Team	Year	Regular season					Postseason			
Team	Year	Won	Lost	Ties	Win %	Finish	Won	Lost	Win %	Result
ATL	2007	3	10	0	.231	Resigned	—	—	—	—
Total		3	10	0	.231		0	0	.000	
