= Arkansas Razorbacks football statistical leaders =

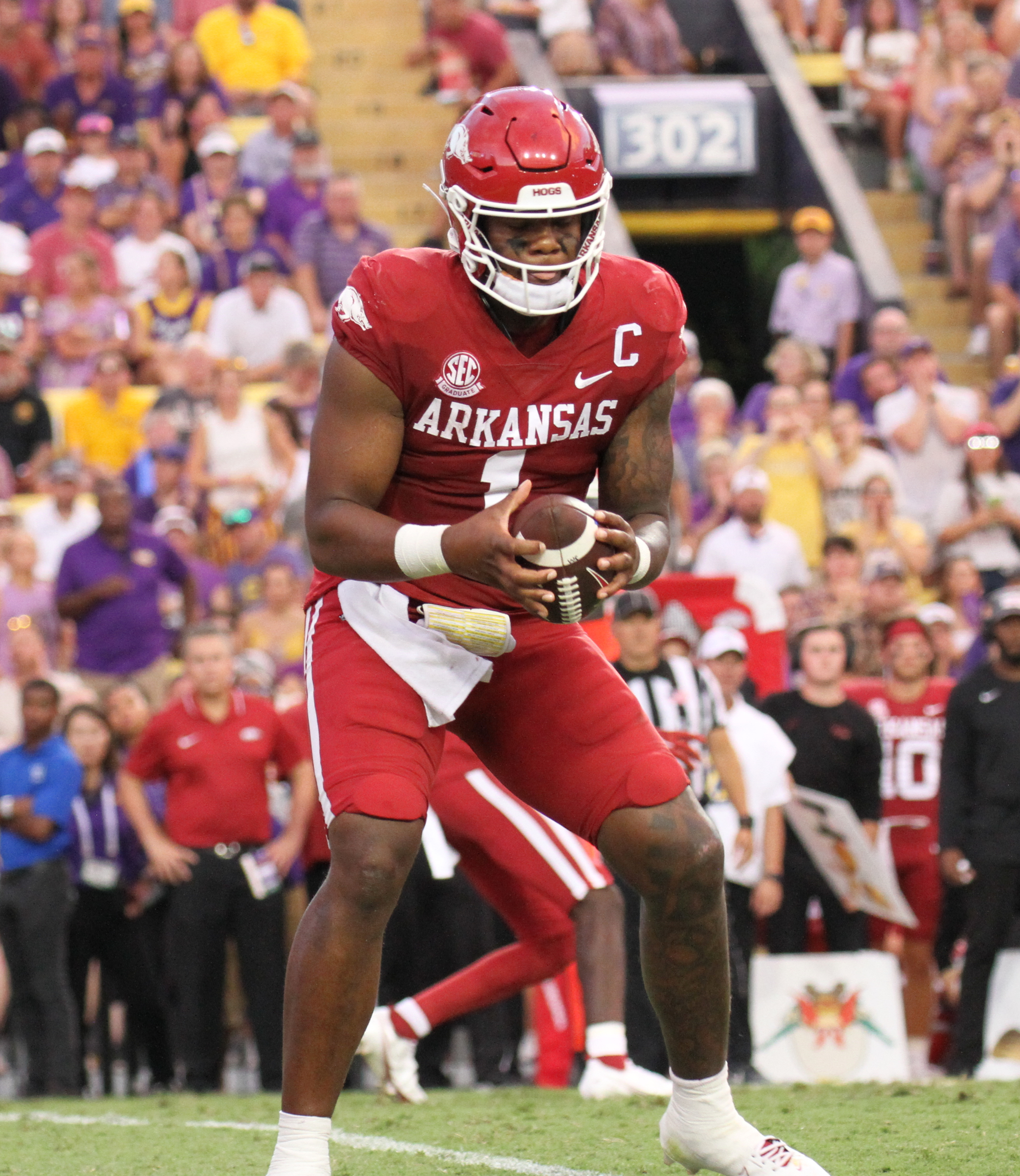
KJ Jefferson is the Razorbacks' career passing yards, passing touchdowns, total offence, and total touchdowns leader.

The Arkansas Razorbacks football statistical leaders are individual statistical leaders of the Arkansas Razorbacks football program in various categories, including passing, rushing, receiving, total offense, defensive stats, and kicking. Within those areas, the lists identify single-game, single-season, and career leaders. The Razorbacks represent the University of Arkansas in the NCAA's Southeastern Conference.

Although Arkansas began competing in intercollegiate football in 1894, the school's official record book considers the "modern era" to have begun in 1945. Records from before this year are often incomplete and inconsistent, and they are generally not included in these lists.

These lists are dominated by more recent players for several reasons:

- Since 1945, seasons have increased from 10 games to 11 and then 12 games in length.
- The NCAA didn't allow freshmen to play varsity football until 1972 (with the exception of the World War II years), allowing players to have four-year careers.
- Bowl games only began counting toward single-season and career statistics in 2002. The Razorbacks have played in 10 bowl games since this decision, allowing players on those teams to accumulate statistics for an additional game. Similarly, the SEC instituted a championship game in 1992. The Razorbacks have played in this championship game three times.
- The 10 Razorback seasons with the highest total offensive output (by yards) have come since 2000.

These lists are updated through the end of the 2025 season.

== Passing ==
=== Passing yards ===
Career
Rank	Player	Yards	Years
1	KJ Jefferson	7,923	2019 2020 2021 2022 2023
2	Tyler Wilson	7,765	2008 2009 2010 2011 2012
3	Ryan Mallett	7,493	2009 2010
4	Brandon Allen	7,463	2012 2013 2014 2015
5	Clint Stoerner	7,422	1996 1997 1998 1999
6	Taylen Green	5,868	2024 2025
7	Matt Jones	5,857	2001 2002 2003 2004
8	Casey Dick	5,856	2005 2006 2007 2008
9	Barry Lunney Jr.	5,782	1992 1993 1994 1995
10	Austin Allen	5,045	2014 2015 2016 2017

Single-season
Rank	Player	Yards	Year
1	Ryan Mallett	3,869	2010
2	Tyler Wilson	3,638	2011
3	Ryan Mallett	3,624	2009
4	Brandon Allen	3,440	2015
5	Austin Allen	3,430	2016
6	Tyler Wilson	3,387	2012
7	Taylen Green	3,154	2024
8	Taylen Green	2,714	2025
9	KJ Jefferson	2,676	2021
10	KJ Jefferson	2,648	2022

Single game
Rank	Player	Yards	Year	Opponent
1	Tyler Wilson	510	2011	Texas A&M
2	Brandon Allen	442	2015	Ole Miss
3	Tyler Wilson	419	2012	Rutgers
4	Taylen Green	416	2024	Oklahoma State
5	Brandon Allen	412	2015	Toledo
6	Ryan Mallett	409	2010	Vanderbilt
7	Ryan Mallett	408	2009	Georgia
8	Brandon Allen	406	2015	Mississippi State
9	Ryan Mallett	405	2009	Troy
10	Ryan Mallett	400	2010	Louisiana-Monroe
	Austin Allen	400	2016	Alabama

=== Passing touchdowns ===
Career
Rank	Player	TDs	Years
1	KJ Jefferson	67	2019 2020 2021 2022 2023
2	Brandon Allen	64	2012 2013 2014 2015
3	Ryan Mallett	62	2009 2010
4	Clint Stoerner	57	1996 1997 1998 1999
5	Matt Jones	53	2001 2002 2003 2004
6	Tyler Wilson	52	2008 2009 2010 2011 2012
7	Casey Dick	47	2005 2006 2007 2008
8	Austin Allen	36	2014 2015 2016 2017
9	Taylen Green	34	2024 2025
10	Barry Lunney Jr.	33	1992 1993 1994 1995

Single-season
Rank	Player	TDs	Year
1	Ryan Mallett	32	2010
2	Ryan Mallett	30	2009
	Brandon Allen	30	2015
4	Clint Stoerner	26	1998
5	Austin Allen	25	2016
6	Tyler Wilson	24	2011
	KJ Jefferson	24	2022
8	Tyler Wilson	21	2012
	KJ Jefferson	21	2021
10	Brandon Allen	20	2014

Single game
Rank	Player	TDs	Year	Opponent
1	Brandon Allen	7	2015	Mississippi State
2	Brandon Allen	6	2015	Ole Miss
	Taylen Green	6	2025	Alabama A&M
4	Ryan Mallett	5	2009	Georgia
	Ryan Mallett	5	2009	Troy
	Ryan Mallett	5	2009	Mississippi State
	Ryan Mallett	5	2010	UTEP
	Tyler Wilson	5	2012	Kentucky
	KJ Jefferson	5	2022	BYU
	Taylen Green	5	2024	Mississippi State

== Rushing ==
=== Rushing yards ===
Career
Rank	Player	Yards	Years
1	Darren McFadden	4,590	2005 2006 2007
2	Alex Collins	3,703	2013 2014 2015
3	Ben Cowins	3,570	1975 1976 1977 1978
4	Dickey Morton	3,317	1971 1972 1973
5	Cedric Cobbs	3,018	1999 2000 2001 2002 2003
6	Felix Jones	2,956	2005 2006 2007
7	James Rouse	2,887	1985 1986 1987 1988 1989
8	Fred Talley	2,661	1999 2000 2001 2002
9	Matt Jones	2,535	2001 2002 2003 2004
10	Madre Hill	2,407	1994 1995 1998

Single-season
Rank	Player	Yards	Year
1	Darren McFadden	1,830	2007
2	Darren McFadden	1,647	2006
3	Rawleigh Williams III	1,614	2016
4	Alex Collins	1,577	2015
5	Raheim Sanders	1,443	2022
6	Madre Hill	1,387	1995
7	Knile Davis	1,322	2010
8	Cedric Cobbs	1,320	2003
9	Dickey Morton	1,298	1973
10	Jonathan Williams	1,190	2014

Single game
Rank	Player	Yards	Year	Opponent
1	Darren McFadden	321	2007	South Carolina
2	Dickey Morton	271	1973	Baylor
3	Fred Talley	241	2002	Auburn
4	Leon Campbell	236	1949	North Texas
5	Raheim Sanders	232	2022	Ole Miss
6	James Rouse	219	1987	New Mexico
	Darren McFadden	219	2006	South Carolina
8	Ike Forte	215	1974	Texas Tech
9	Fred Talley	214	2000	Ole Miss
10	Alex Collins	212	2014	Texas Tech

=== Rushing touchdowns ===
Career
Rank	Player	TDs	Years
1	Bill Burnett	46	1968 1969 1970
2	Darren McFadden	41	2005 2006 2007
3	James Rouse	38	1985 1986 1987 1988 1989
4	Alex Collins	36	2013 2014 2015
5	Ben Cowins	30	1975 1976 1977 1978
6	Cedric Cobbs	26	1999 2000 2001 2002 2003
7	David Dickey	25	1966 1967 1968
	Madre Hill	25	1994 1995 1998
9	Chrys Chukwuma	24	1996 1997 1998 1999
	Matt Jones	24	2001 2002 2003 2004

Single-season
Rank	Player	TDs	Year
1	Alex Collins	20	2015
2	Bill Burnett	19	1969
3	James Rouse	17	1987
4	Bobby Burnett	16	1965
	Darren McFadden	16	2007
6	Bill Burnett	15	1968
	Madre Hill	15	1995
	Ja'Quinden Jackson	15	2024
9	Billy Moore	14	1962
	Ben Cowins	14	1977
	Darren McFadden	14	2006

Single game
Rank	Player	TDs	Year	Opponent
1	Madre Hill	6	1995	South Carolina
2	Gene Davidson	5	1915	Hendrix
	Gene Davidson	5	1916	Oklahoma Mines
	Jessie Clark	5	1981	Baylor
	Alex Collins	5	2015	Tennessee-Martin

== Receiving ==
=== Receptions ===
Career
Rank	Player	Rec	Years
1	Cobi Hamilton	175	2009 2010 2011 2012
2	Jarius Wright	168	2008 2009 2010 2011
3	Joe Adams	164	2008 2009 2010 2011
4	Anthony Eubanks	153	1994 1995 1996 1997
5	D.J. Williams	152	2007 2008 2009 2010
6	Treylon Burks	146	2019 2020 2021
7	George Wilson	144	2000 2001 2002 2003
8	Marcus Monk	138	2004 2005 2006 2007
	Drew Morgan	138	2013 2014 2015 2016
10	Anthony Lucas	137	1996 1997 1998 1999

Single-season
Rank	Player	Rec	Year
1	Cobi Hamilton	90	2012
2	Andrew Armstrong	78	2024
3	Jarius Wright	66	2011
	Treylon Burks	66	2021
5	Drew Morgan	65	2016
6	Drew Morgan	63	2015
7	J.J. Meadors	62	1995
8	D.J. Williams	61	2008
9	Jadon Haselwood	59	2022
10	O'Mega Blake	58	2025

Single game
Rank	Player	Rec	Year	Opponent
1	Wear Schoonover	13	1929	Baylor
	James Shibest	13	1984	SMU
	Jarius Wright	13	2011	Texas A&M
4	Chuck Dicus	12	1968	Georgia
	Mike Reppond	12	1971	Rice
	Greg Childs	12	2010	Louisiana-Monroe
	Cobi Hamilton	12	2012	Ole Miss
8	Cobi Hamilton	11	2012	Texas A&M
	Cobi Hamilton	11	2012	Tulsa
	Treylon Burks	11	2020	Ole Miss

=== Receiving yards ===
Career
Rank	Player	Yards	Years
1	Jarius Wright	2,934	2008 2009 2010 2011
2	Anthony Lucas	2,879	1996 1997 1998 1999
3	Cobi Hamilton	2,854	2009 2010 2011 2012
4	Anthony Eubanks	2,440	1994 1995 1996 1997
5	Joe Adams	2,410	2008 2009 2010 2011
6	Treylon Burks	2,399	2019 2020 2021
7	Marcus Monk	2,151	2004 2005 2006 2007
8	George Wilson	2,151	2000 2001 2002 2003
9	Greg Childs	2,066	2008 2009 2010 2011
10	James Shibest	1,920	1983 1984 1985 1986

Single-season
Rank	Player	Yards	Year
1	Cobi Hamilton	1,335	2012
2	Andrew Armstrong	1,140	2024
3	Jarius Wright	1,117	2011
4	Treylon Burks	1,104	2021
5	Anthony Lucas	1,004	1998
6	Mike Reppond	986	1971
7	Marcus Monk	962	2006
8	James Shibest	907	1984
9	Matt Landers	901	2022
10	George Wilson	900	2003

Single game
Rank	Player	Yards	Year	Opponent
1	Cobi Hamilton	303	2012	Rutgers
2	Jarius Wright	281	2011	Texas A&M
3	Treylon Burks	206	2020	Missouri
4	Mike Reppond	204	1971	Rice
5	Lucas Miller	201	2008	Mississippi State
6	James Shibest	199	1984	SMU
7	Chris Marshall	195	2026	Tulsa
8	Anthony Lucas	194	1999	SMU
9	Chuck Dicus	193	1968	Rice
10	Marcus Monk	192	2006	South Carolina

=== Receiving touchdowns ===
Career
Rank	Player	TDs	Years
1	Marcus Monk	27	2004 2005 2006 2007
2	Jarius Wright	24	2008 2009 2010 2011
3	Anthony Lucas	23	1996 1997 1998 1999
4	Keon Hatcher	19	2012 2013 2014 2015 2016
5	Cobi Hamilton	18	2009 2010 2011 2012
	Treylon Burks	18	2019 2020 2021
7	Richard Smith	17	2000 2001 2002 2003
	Joe Adams	17	2008 2009 2010 2011
9	Chuck Dicus	16	1968 1969 1970
	Derek Russell	16	1987 1988 1989 1990
	Anthony Eubanks	16	1994 1995 1996 1997
	George Wilson	16	2000 2001 2002 2003

Single-season
Rank	Player	TDs	Year
1	Jarius Wright	12	2011
2	Marcus Monk	11	2006
	Treylon Burks	11	2021
4	Anthony Lucas	10	1998
	Drew Morgan	10	2015
6	Chuck Dicus	8	1968
	Derek Russell	8	1990
	Matt Landers	8	2022
9	Wear Schoonover	7	1929
	Jim Benton	7	1937
	James Shibest	7	1984
	Boo Williams	7	2000
	George Wilson	7	2002
	Treylon Burks	7	2020

Single game
Rank	Player	TDs	Year	Opponent
1	Alton Baldwin	3	1944	Arkansas A&M
	Alton Baldwin	3	1945	TCU
	Anthony Lucas	3	1999	SMU
	Cobi Hamilton	3	2012	Rutgers
	Drew Morgan	3	2015	Ole Miss
	Jeremy Sprinkle	3	2015	Mississippi State
	Matt Landers	3	2022	BYU

== Total offense ==
Total offense is the sum of passing and rushing statistics. It does not include receiving or returns.

=== Total offense yards ===
Career
Rank	Player	Yards	Years
1	KJ Jefferson	9,799	2019 2020 2021 2022 2023
2	Matt Jones	8,392	2001 2002 2003 2004
3	Tyler Wilson	7,721	2008 2009 2010 2011 2012
4	Brandon Allen	7,596	2012 2013 2014 2015
5	Ryan Mallett	7,390	2009 2010
6	Taylen Green	7,247	2024 2025
7	Clint Stoerner	7,049	1996 1997 1998 1999
8	Quinn Grovey	6,242	1987 1988 1989 1990
9	Barry Lunney Jr.	5,887	1992 1993 1994 1995
10	Casey Dick	5,623	2005 2006 2007 2008

Single season
Rank	Player	Yards	Year
1	Ryan Mallett	3,795	2010
2	Taylen Green	3,756	2024
3	Tyler Wilson	3,635	2011
4	Ryan Mallett	3,595	2009
5	Brandon Allen	3,547	2015
6	Austin Allen	3,492	2016
7	Taylen Green	3,491	2025
8	Tyler Wilson	3,394	2012
9	KJ Jefferson	3,340	2021
10	KJ Jefferson	3,288	2022

Single game
Rank	Player	Yards	Year	Opponent
1	Tyler Wilson	481	2011	Texas A&M
2	Taylen Green	477	2024	Oklahoma State
3	Brandon Allen	448	2015	Ole Miss
4	Brandon Allen	435	2015	Toledo
5	Tyler Wilson	426	2012	Rutgers
6	KJ Jefferson	425	2022	Missouri State
7	Taylen Green	422	2024	Texas Tech
8	Taylen Green	420	2025	Ole Miss
9	KJ Jefferson	417	2022	Kansas
10	Ryan Mallett	414	2009	Georgia

=== Touchdowns responsible for ===
"Touchdowns responsible for" is the NCAA's official term for combined passing and rushing touchdowns.

Career
Rank	Player	TDs	Years
1	KJ Jefferson	88	2019 2020 2021 2022 2023
2	Matt Jones	77	2001 2002 2003 2004
3	Ryan Mallett	68	2009 2010
	Brandon Allen	68	2012 2013 2014 2015
5	Clint Stoerner	62	1996 1997 1998 1999
6	Tyler Wilson	56	2008 2009 2010 2011 2012
7	Quinn Grovey	50	1987 1988 1989 1990
	Casey Dick	50	2005 2006 2007 2008
	Taylen Green	50	2024 2025
10	Darren McFadden	48	2005 2006 2007

Single season
Rank	Player	TDs	Year
1	Ryan Mallett	36	2010
2	KJ Jefferson	33	2022
3	Ryan Mallett	32	2009
4	Brandon Allen	31	2015
5	Tyler Wilson	28	2011
6	Clint Stoerner	27	1998
	Austin Allen	27	2016
	KJ Jefferson	27	2021
	Taylen Green	27	2025
10	Matt Jones	26	2003

Single game
Rank	Player	TDs	Year	Opponent
1	Brandon Allen	7	2015	Mississippi State
2	Madre Hill	6	1995	South Carolina
	Ryan Mallett	6	2010	UTEP
	Brandon Allen	6	2015	Ole Miss
	KJ Jefferson	6	2021	Ole Miss
	Taylen Green	6	2024	Mississippi State
	Taylen Green	6	2025	Alabama A&M
8	Gene Davidson	5	1915	Hendrix
	Gene Davidson	5	1916	Oklahoma Mines
	Jessie Clark	5	1981	Baylor
	Quinn Grovey	5	1989	Houston
	Ryan Mallett	5	2009	Georgia
	Ryan Mallett	5	2009	Troy
	Ryan Mallett	5	2009	Mississippi State
	Tyler Wilson	5	2012	Kentucky
	Alex Collins	5	2015	Tennessee-Martin
	Rawleigh Williams III	5	2016	Mississippi State
	KJ Jefferson	5	2022	BYU
	Taylen Green	5	2025	Arkansas State
	Taylen Green	5	2025	Texas A&M

== Defense ==
=== Interceptions ===
Career
Rank	Player	Ints	Years
1	Steve Atwater	14	1985 1986 1987 1988
2	Gary Adams	13	1966 1967 1968
3	Tommy Trantham	12	1965 1966 1967
	Louis Campbell	12	1970 1971 1972
	Orlando Watters	12	1991 1992 1993
	Tramain Thomas	12	2008 2009 2010 2011
7	Anthoney Cooney	11	1986 1987 1988 1989
8	Louis Schaufele	10	1948 1949 1950
	Jim Rinehart	10	1949 1950 1951
	George Walker	10	1954 1955 1956 1957

Single-season
Rank	Player	Ints	Year
1	Jim Rinehart	10	1949
2	Gary Adams	7	1966
	Louis Campbell	7	1971
4	George Walker	6	1954
	Tommy Trantham	6	1967
	David Hogue	6	1970
	Patrick Williams	6	1988
	Orlando Watters	6	1993

Single game
Rank	Player	Ints	Year	Opponent
1	Wear Schoonover	5	1929	Texas
2	Kay Eakin	3	1937	SMU
	Billy Moore	3	1961	SMU
	Louis Campbell	3	1971	Tennessee
	David Hogue	3	1970	SMU
	Michael Grant	3	2006	Louisiana-Monroe
	Hudson Clark	3	2020	Ole Miss

=== Tackles ===
Career
Rank	Player	Tackles	Years
1	Bumper Pool	441	2018 2019 2020 2021 2022
2	Tony Bua	408	2000 2001 2002 2003
3	Jerry Franklin	382	2008 2009 2010 2011
4	Ken Hamlin	381	2000 2001 2002
5	Sam Olajubutu	372	2003 2004 2005 2006
6	Caleb Miller	368	2000 2001 2002 2003
7	Cliff Powell	367	1967 1968 1969
8	De'Jon Harris	364	2016 2017 2018 2019
9	Ronnie Caveness	357	1962 1963 1964
10	Rickey Williams	343	1984 1985 1986 1987

Single-season
Rank	Player	Tackles	Year
1	Wayne Harris	174	1960
2	Ken Hamlin	159	2002
3	Ronnie Caveness	155	1964
4	Ronnie Caveness	154	1963
	Cliff Powell	154	1968
6	Rickey Williams	140	1987
	Jermaine Petty	140	2001
8	Mick Thomas	136	1990
9	Cliff Powell	134	1969
10	Caleb Miller	133	2003

Single game
Rank	Player	Tackles	Year	Opponent
1	Ronnie Caveness	29	1963	Texas
2	Ronnie Caveness	25	1964	Texas
3	Cliff Powell	24	1969	Texas
4	Ronnie Caveness	23	1963	Missouri
5	Loyd Phillips	22	1965	Tulsa
	Quinton Caver	22	2000	Alabama
	Ken Hamlin	22	2002	Troy
8	Ronnie Caveness	21	1963	Baylor
	William Hampton	21	1977	Oklahoma State
10	LaSalle Harper	20	1988	UCLA
	Bumper Pool	20	2020	Mississippi State

=== Sacks ===
Career
Rank	Player	Sacks	Years
1	Wayne Martin	26.0	1985 1986 1987 1988
2	Henry Ford	25.0	1990 1991 1992 1993
3	Jake Bequette	24.0	2008 2009 2010 2011
4	Chris Smith	22.0	2010 2011 2012 2013
5	Steven Conley	21.0	1992 1993 1994 1995
6	Marcus Adair	19.0	1993 1994 1995
7	Scott Long	18.0	1989 1990 1991 1992
	Jamaal Anderson	18.0	2004 2005 2006
	Trey Flowers	18.0	2011 2012 2013 2014
10	Ray Lee Johnson	16.0	1990 1991 1992
	Landon Jackson	16.0	2022 2023 2024

Single-season
Rank	Player	Sacks	Year
1	Henry Ford	14.0	1993
	Steven Conley	14.0	1995
3	Jamaal Anderson	13.5	2006
4	Wayne Martin	13.0	1988
5	Ray Lee Johnson	11.0	1992
6	Jake Bequette	10.0	2011
7	Chris Smith	9.5	2012
	Drew Sanders	9.5	2022
9	Antwain Robinson	8.5	2006
	Chris Smith	8.5	2013

Single game
Rank	Player	Sacks	Year	Opponent
1	Wayne Martin	5.0	1988	Ole Miss

== Kicking ==
=== Field goals made ===
Career
Rank	Player	FGs	Years
1	Zach Hocker	61	2010 2011 2012 2013
2	Todd Wright	60	1989 1990 1991 1992
3	Steve Little	53	1974 1975 1976 1977
	Cam Little	53	2021 2022 2023
5	Kendall Trainor	51	1985 1986 1987 1988
6	Todd Latourette	47	1995 1996 1997 1998
7	Ish Ordonez	44	1978 1979 1980
8	Conner Limpert	41	2016 2017 2018 2019
9	Alex Tejada	37	2007 2008 2009 2010
10	Bill McClard	29	1969 1970 1971
	Greg Horne	29	1983 1984 1985 1986

Single season
Rank	Player	FGs	Year
1	Kendall Trainor	24	1988
2	Zach Hocker	21	2011
3	Todd Wright	20	1989
	Cam Little	20	2021
	Cam Little	20	2023
6	Steve Little	19	1977
	Bruce Lahay	19	1981
	Connor Limpert	19	2018
9	Ish Ordonez	18	1978
10	Todd Wright	17	1992
	Todd Latourette	17	1998
	Alex Tejada	17	2007

Single game
Rank	Player	FGs	Year	Opponent
1	Kendall Trainor	5	1988	Texas A&M
	Kendall Trainor	5	1988	TCU

=== Field goal percentage ===
Career
Rank	Player	FG%	Years
1	Cam Little	82.8%	2021 2022 2023
2	Connor Limpert	78.8%	2016 2017 2018 2019
3	Scott Starzyk	77.8%	2025
4	Zach Hocker	75.0%	2010 2011 2012 2013
5	Todd Wright	75.9%	1989 1990 1991 1992
6	Kendall Trainor	73.9%	1985 1986 1987 1988
7	Ish Ordonez	71.0%	1978 1979 1980
8	Chris Balseiro	70.0%	2002 2003 2004 2005
9	Brennan O'Donohoe	68.8%	2000 2001 2002
10	Alex Tejada	68.5%	2007 2008 2009 2010

Single season
Rank	Player	FG%	Year
1	Kendall Trainor	88.9%	1988
2	Todd Wright	87.0%	1989
3	Zach Hocker	86.7%	2013
4	Zach Hocker	84.2%	2010
5	Cam Little	83.3%	2021
	Cam Little	83.3%	2023
7	Ish Ordonez	81.8%	1979
8	Cam Little	81.3%	2022
9	Bruce Lahay	79.2%	1981
	Connor Limpert	79.2%	2018
