= 1988 All-Southwest Conference football team =

American college football all-star team

The 1988 All-Southwest Conference football team consists of American football players chosen by various organizations for All-Southwest Conference teams for the 1988 NCAA Division I-A football season. The selectors for the 1988 season included the Associated Press (AP) and the United Press International (UPI).

== Offensive selections ==
=== Quarterbacks ===
- Quinn Grovey, Arkansas (AP-1; UPI-2)
- Billy Joe Tolliver, Texas Tech (UPI-1)

=== Running backs ===
- Darren Lewis, Texas A&M (AP-1; UPI-1)
- Eric Metcalf, Texas (AP-1; UPI-1)
- Barry Foster, Arkansas (UPI-2)
- Chuck Weatherspoon, Houston (UPI-2)

=== Tight ends ===
- Billy Winston, Arkansas (AP-1; UPI-2)

=== Wide receivers ===
- Jason Phillips, Houston (AP-1; UPI-1)
- Jason Dixon, Houston (AP-1; UPI-1)
- Tony Jones, Texas (AP-1; UPI-1)
- Jarrod Delaney, TCU (UPI-2)
- Mike Boudousquie, Rice (UPI-2)

=== Tackles ===
- Matt McCall, Texas A&M (AP-1; UPI-1)
- Jim Mabry, Arkansas (AP-1; UPI-2)
- Charles Odiorne, Texas Tech (UPI-1)
- Mark Bass, Baylor (UPI-2)

=== Guards ===
- Freddie Childress, Arkansas (AP-1; UPI-1)
- Jerry Fontenot, Texas A&M (AP-1; UPI-1)
- Richmond Webb, Texas A&M (UPI-2)
- Mark Henry, Arkansas (UPI-2)

=== Centers ===
- Courtney Hall, Rice (AP-1; UPI-1)
- Elbert Crawford, Arkansas (AP-2)
- Bobby Sign, Baylor (UPI-2)

== Defensive selections ==
=== Defensive lineman ===
- Wayne Martin, Arkansas (AP-1; UPI-1)
- Glenn Montgomery, Houston (AP-1; UPI-1)
- Tracy Simien, TCU (AP-1; UPI-2)
- Mitchell Benson, TCU (AP-1)
- Desmond Royal, Texas Tech (UPI-1)
- Kerry Crawford, Arkansas (AP-2; UPI-2)
- Michael Shepherd, Arkansas (AP-2; UPI-1)
- Alfred Oglesby, Houston (UPI-2)
- Kerry Lynch, Texas Tech (UPI-2)

=== Linebackers ===
- Britt Hager, Texas (AP-1; UPI-1)
- John Roper, Texas A&M (AP-1; UPI-1)
- Kerry Owens, Arkansas (AP-1; UPI-1)
- Aaron Wallace, Texas A&M (AP-1; UPI-2)
- James Francis, Baylor (UPI-2)
- Gary Joe Kinne, Baylor (UPI-2)

=== Secondary ===
- Steve Atwater, Arkansas (AP-1; UPI-1)
- Falanda Newton, TCU (AP-1; UPI-1)
- Johnnie Jackson, Houston (AP-1; UPI-1)
- Mickey Washington, Texas A&M (UPI-1)
- Patrick Williams, Arkansas (AP-2; UPI-2)
- Richard Brothers, Arkansas (AP-2)
- Robert Blackmon, Baylor (UPI-2)
- Alex Morris, Texas A&M (UPI-2)
- Donald Harris, Texas Tech (UPI-2)

== Special teams ==
=== Placekickers ===
- Kendall Trainor, Arkansas (AP-1; UPI-1)
- Roman Anderson, Houston (UPI-2)

=== Punters ===
- Bobby Lilljedahl, Texas (AP-1; UPI-1)
- Jamie Simmons, Texas Tech (UPI-2)

=== Return specialists ===
- Tyrone Thurman, Texas Tech (AP-1)

== Miscellaneous ==
- Offensive Player of the Year: Darren Lewis, Texas A&M (AP; UPI)
- Defensive Player of the Year: Wayne Martin, Arkansas (AP; UPI)
- Coach of the Year: Ken Hatfield, Arkansas (AP; UPI)
- Offensive Newcomer of the Year: Robert Wilson, Texas A&M (AP)
- Defensive Newcomer of the Year: Willie Mack Garza, Texas (AP)
- Conference champion: Arkansas Razorbacks

== Key ==
AP = Associated Press

UPI = United Press International

Bold = Consensus first-team selection of both the AP and UPI

== See also ==
1988 College Football All-America Team
