= Fred Childress =

American gridiron football player (born 1966)

Freddie Childress
No. 68
- Position: Offensive Tackle

Personal information
- Born: September 17, 1966 (age 60); Little Rock, Arkansas, U.S.
- Listed height: 6 ft 4 in (1.93 m)
- Listed weight: 345 lb (156 kg)

Career information
- College: Arkansas
- NFL draft: 1989: 2nd round, 55th overall pick

Career history
- 1989: Cincinnati Bengals*
- 1989: Los Angeles Raiders*
- 1991: Dallas Cowboys*
- 1991: New England Patriots
- 1992: Cleveland Browns
- 1994: Shreveport Pirates
- 1995: Birmingham Barracudas
- 1996–1998: Calgary Stampeders
- 1999: Dallas Cowboys*
- 1999–2003: Calgary Stampeders
- 2004–2006: Saskatchewan Roughriders
- * Offseason or practice squad member only

Awards and highlights
- 2× Grey Cup champion (1998, 2001); CFL's Most Outstanding Offensive Lineman Award (1998); 2× DeMarco-Becket Memorial Trophy (1997, 1998); 6× CFL All-Star (1995, 1996, 1997, 1998, 2000, 2001); 5× CFL West All-Star (1996, 1997, 1998, 2000, 2001); Second-team All-American (1986); Third-team All-American (1988); 2× First-team All-SWC (1986, 1988); Second-team All-SWC (1987)
- Stats at Pro Football Reference
- Stats at CFL.ca (archive)
- Canadian Football Hall of Fame (Class of 2020)

Freddie Lee Childress (born September 17, 1966) is an American former professional football player who was an offensive tackle in the Canadian Football League (CFL) and National Football League (NFL). A CFL All-Star, he was nicknamed as "the Big Chill" for his 6 feet 4 inch and 345 pound size. He played college football for the Arkansas Razorbacks.

== Early life ==
While born in Little Rock, Arkansas, Childress grew up in Helena, Arkansas, playing football in high school for the Central High School Cougars. Coming out of high school, Childress was highly recruited by many top football programs, finally deciding to stay home and attend the University of Arkansas, then coached by Ken Hatfield.

== College career ==
Childress played college football at the University of Arkansas, where he was selected as a 2nd team All-American by Pro Football Weekly as a senior in 1988. There he played with other standouts such as Steve Atwater and Barry Foster. Childress was immediately a starter at offensive guard as a freshman for Arkansas in 1985, helping the team finish 10-2 and beating the Arizona State Sun Devils in the 1985 Holiday Bowl, 18-17. As a senior, Childress helped Arkansas win the 1988 Southwest Conference championship, finishing 10-2. Childress and teammate Wayne Martin were suspended for the 1989 Cotton Bowl Classic by head coach Ken Hatfield for undisclosed reasons, and Arkansas lost the Cotton Bowl to Troy Aikman and the UCLA Bruins, 17-3.

== Professional career ==
Childress was selected in the second round of the 1989 NFL Draft by the Cincinnati Bengals. After two seasons of tryouts, he finally played one season for the New England Patriots in 1991 (scoring a touchdown) and another in 1992 for the Cleveland Browns.

Childress moved to the CFL with the Shreveport Pirates in 1994 and switched to the Birmingham Barracudas in 1995 (both failed expansion franchises in the CFL bid to play in the US). He then went on to an 8-year stay with the Calgary Stampeders, where he was an all-star 6 times, received the CFL's Most Outstanding Offensive Lineman Award in 1998, the DeMarco-Becket Memorial Trophy in 1997 and won the Grey Cup in 1998 and 2001.

Childress played his final three seasons with the Saskatchewan Roughriders. He retired from the CFL after the 2006 season. He was inducted into the Canadian Football Hall of Fame as a player in 2020.
