= 1987 All-Southwest Conference football team =

American college football all-star team

The 1987 All-Southwest Conference football team consists of American football players chosen by various organizations for All-Southwest Conference teams for the 1987 NCAA Division I-A football season. The selectors for the 1987 season included the Associated Press (AP).

== Offensive selections ==
=== Quarterbacks ===
- Billy Joe Tolliver, Texas Tech (AP-1)
- David Rascoe, TCU (AP-2)

=== Running backs ===
- Eric Metcalf, Texas (AP-1)
- James Gray, Texas Tech (AP-1)
- Tony Jeffery, TCU (AP-2)
- Darren Lewis, Texas A&M (AP-2)
- James Rouse, Arkansas (AP-2)
- Keith Woodside, Texas A&M (AP-2)

=== Wide receivers ===
- Rod Harris, Texas A&M (AP-1)
- Jason Phillips, Houston (AP-1)
- Wayne Walker, Texas Tech (AP-1)
- Ricky Stone, TCU (AP-2)
- Eddy Anderson, Texas Tech (AP-2)
- Tony Jones, Texas (AP-2)

=== Centers ===
- Matt Wilson, Texas A&M (AP-1)
- Clint Hailey, TCU (AP-2)

=== Guards ===
- Paul Jetton, Texas (AP-1)
- Mike McBride, Texas Tech (AP-1)
- Jeff Keith, Texas Tech (AP-2)
- Fred Childress, Arkansas (AP-2)

=== Tackles ===
- Louis Cheek, Texas A&M (AP-1)
- Brian Brazil, TCU (AP-1)
- Joel Porter, Baylor (AP-2)
- Chris Bequette, Arkansas (AP-2)

== Defensive selections ==
=== Defensive lineman ===
- Sammy O'Brient, Texas A&M (AP-1)
- Tony Cherico, Arkansas (AP-1)
- David Spradlin, TCU (AP-1)
- Thomas Aldridge, Texas (AP-2)
- Desmond Royal, Texas Tech (AP-2)
- Artis Jackson, Texas Tech (AP-2)
- Steve Llewellyn, Texas (AP-2)
- Mitchell Benson, TCU (AP-2)

=== Linebackers ===
- John Roper, Texas A&M (AP-1)
- Britt Hager, Texas (AP-1)
- Rickey Williams, Arkansas (AP-1)
- Gary McGuire, Houston (AP-1)
- Michael Johnson, Texas Tech (AP-2)
- Aaron Wallace, Texas A&M (AP-2)
- Floyd Terrell, TCU (AP-2)
- James Francis, Baylor (AP-2)

=== Secondary ===
- Kip Corrington, Texas A&M (AP-1)
- Falanda Newton, TCU (AP-1)
- John Hagy, Texas (AP-1)
- Johnnie Jackson, Houston (AP-1)
- Robert Blackmon, Baylor (AP-1)
- Chet Brooks, Texas A&M (AP-2)
- Alex Morris, Texas A&M (AP-2)
- Steve Atwater, Arkansas (AP-2)
- Eric Everett, Texas Tech (AP-2)

== Special teams ==
=== Place-kickers ===
- Scott Slater, Texas A&M (AP-1)

=== Punters ===
- Chris Becker, TCU (AP-1)

== Miscellaneous ==
- Offensive Player of the Year: Eric Metcalf, Texas (AP)
- Defensive Player of the Year: John Roper, Texas A&M (AP)
- Coach of the Year: Jackie Sherrill, Texas A&M (AP)
- Offensive Newcomer of the Year: Darren Lewis, Texas A&M (AP)
- Defensive Newcomer of the Year: Donald Harris, Texas Tech (AP)

== Key ==
AP = Associated Press
