= Bill Hawkins (American football) =

American football player (born 1966)

No. 70
- Position: Defensive end

Personal information
- Born: May 9, 1966 (age 60); Miami, Florida, U.S.
- Listed height: 6 ft 6 in (1.98 m)
- Listed weight: 269 lb (122 kg)

Career information
- High school: South Broward (Hollywood, Florida)
- College: Miami (FL)
- NFL draft: 1989: 1st round, 21st overall pick

Career history
- Los Angeles Rams (1989–1992)

Awards and highlights
- PFWA All-Rookie Team (1989); National champion (1987); Consensus All-American (1988); Second Team All-South Independent (1987)

Career NFL statistics
- Games: 42
- Sacks: 5
- Tackles: 39
- Stats at Pro Football Reference

William E. Hawkins (born May 9, 1966) is an American former professional football player who was a defensive end for four seasons with the Los Angeles Rams in the National Football League (NFL). He played college football for the Miami Hurricanes, earning consensus All-American honors in 1988.

== Early life ==
Hawkins was born in Miami, Florida. He was an All-State selection and second-team high school All-American at South Broward High School, (Florida), in 1983. His 3.85 GPA was the highest on the football team.

== College career ==
Hawkins was a 3-year starter at the University of Miami at defensive end. redshirted in 1984 and as a freshman, in 1985, he was a backup and recorded 10 tackles. As a sophomore, he moved into the starting lineup and had 62 tackles (10 for a loss) and 7 sacks. In 1987, as a junior he recorded 84 tackles with 14 of them going for a loss to go with his 6.5 sacks.

In 1988, as a senior Hawkins was a First-team All-American selection by the Walter Camp Foundation and the AFCA. He was a Second-team All-American selection by the AP, UPI and Sporting News. In 1988 Hawkins tallied 67 tackles (18 for a loss) and 7.5 sacks. He was also a finalist for the Lombardi Award. His coach, Jimmy Johnson called him, "the most consistent lineman he ever coached". While at the "U" Hawkins earned a degree in Finance, with a B average.

In his four years at Miami the Hurricanes had a 44-4 win–loss record and Hawkins played in four "New Years' Day" bowl games: a January 1, 1986, 35-7 loss to the University of Tennessee in the Sugar Bowl; a January 2, 1987, 14-10 loss to Penn State in the Fiesta Bowl; a 20-14 win over the University of Oklahoma in the Orange Bowl on January 1, 1988, and a 23-3 win over Nebraska on January 2, 1989 in the Orange Bowl. The Hurricanes were National Champions after the 1987 season and the victory over Oklahoma.

Hawkins is a member of the University of Miami Sports Hall of Fame.

== Professional career ==
=== Pre-draft ===
Pre-draft measurables
Height	Weight	40-yard dash	20-yard shuttle	Vertical jump	Broad jump	Bench press
6 ft 6 1/8 in (1.98 m)	260 lb (118 kg)	4.73 s	4.44 s	32 in (0.81 m)	9 ft 7 in (2.92 m)	25 reps
All values from NFL Combine

Hawkins measured 6'6 1/18" and 260 pounds at the NFL Combine. Had a "superb showing" at the combine. He ran the 40-yard dash in 4.73. Was described as a "Polished player with 5 years experience on one of nation's top teams. Very intelligent. Positive influence on teammates. Type of lineman who would adapt well to the many adjustments." Was reported to have good quickness and leaping ability along with a good "closing burst" and "good upper-body strength and runs well for a big guy"

=== Los Angeles Rams ===
Hawkins was the 21st selection in the 1st round of the 1989 NFL draft and was the 5th defensive end chosen, behind Burt Grossman (San Diego Chargers), Trace Armstrong (Chicago Bears), Jeff Lageman (New York Jets), and Wayne Martin (New Orleans Saints). Rams Coach John Robinson stated, "Bill is the kind of player that can develop into a big-time pass rusher, the kind of player we've talked about getting but could not find".

After a prolonged holdout Hawkins signed a reported four-year, $1.9-million contract that included a $750,000 signing bonus on August 18, 1989.

He played in 13 games, starting 1, as a rookie and was voted All-Rookie despite missing the final three games with a left knee injury. Finished season with 11 tackles with a high of 6 against the Dallas Cowboys on December 3, 1989. He also forced a fumble that was recovered by teammate Larry Kelm securing the 35-31 win.

In 1990 Hawkins played in 15 games without a start. He was slow to recover from his knee injury which ended his 1989 season. He played mostly defensive tackle in the Rams "Eagle" defense, which was a pass rush scheme. In that role Hawkins made 9 tackles and 3 sacks, with 2 of the sacks coming against the Atlanta Falcons on December 23, 1990. He also batted away two passes in 1990. Hawkins also began pursuing a J.D. degree in 1990.

Injuries and an incompatible defensive style reduced contributions in his first two seasons. "Bill is consistently improving", coach John Robinson said of Hawkins. "He came into (1991) camp really light. We hope he gains weight. His improvement has been very gradual". Hawkins was on injured reserve for 10 games in 1991 and played in only six games as a backup defensive end in the Rams new 4-3 pressure defensive scheme (installed by new defensive coordinator Jeff Fisher), recording 4 tackles for the season and one fumble recovery. Back and rib injuries were the reasons Hawkins missed time in 1991.

With the arrival of new Head Coach Chuck Knox and yet a new defensive scheme Hawkins earned the starting right defensive end spot. Despite suffering a torn calf muscle on August 6, 1992, Hawkins held the starting job for the first half of the season until he injured his knee on November 8, 1992, which ended his season. An MRI revealed he suffered damage to the anterior cruciate ligament in his right knee and underwent major reconstructive surgery. In 1992, in 8 games (7 starts), Hawkins recorded 15 tackles and 2 sacks and batted down 2 passes.

He attempted to come back from knee surgery in 1993 but failed to make the team. On April 27, 1993, he signed a new contract (he was a free agent) but during training camp he was cut. Due to injuries to other Rams defensive linemen he was activated on August 25, 1993. Hawkins participated in his first practice since undergoing knee surgery in November, 1992, and said his knee felt "pretty good". However, Hawkins' career, ended on August 31, 1993, when Chuck Knox informed him that his services were no longer required.

=== Jupiter High School ===
In the 2010–2011 season he coached the defensive line for the varsity team.
