= Britt Hager =

American football player (born 1966)

No. 54, 57
- Position: Linebacker

Personal information
- Born: February 20, 1966 (age 60); Odessa, Texas, U.S.
- Listed height: 6 ft 1 in (1.85 m)
- Listed weight: 242 lb (110 kg)

Career information
- High school: Permian (Odessa, Texas)
- College: Texas
- NFL draft: 1989: 3rd round, 81st overall pick

Career history
- Philadelphia Eagles (1989–1994); Denver Broncos (1995–1996); St. Louis Rams (1997)

Awards and highlights
- First-team All-American (1988); 2× First-team All-SWC (1987, 1988)

Career NFL statistics
- Tackles: 216
- Sacks: 2
- Interceptions: 3
- Stats at Pro Football Reference

Britt Harley Hager (born February 20, 1966) is an American former professional football player who was a linebacker in the National Football League (NFL). He played college football at the University of Texas and was selected in the third round of the 1989 NFL draft with the 81st overall pick. He played in the National Football League (NFL) for the Philadelphia Eagles from 1989 to 1994, for the Denver Broncos from 1995 to 1996, and for the St. Louis Rams in 1997.

At the University of Texas, he set a school record in 1988 with 195 tackles after setting the previous school record with 187 the year before. He also holds the career Texas record with 499 tackles while in Austin.
