= Texas High School =

Public high school in Texarkana, Texas, United States

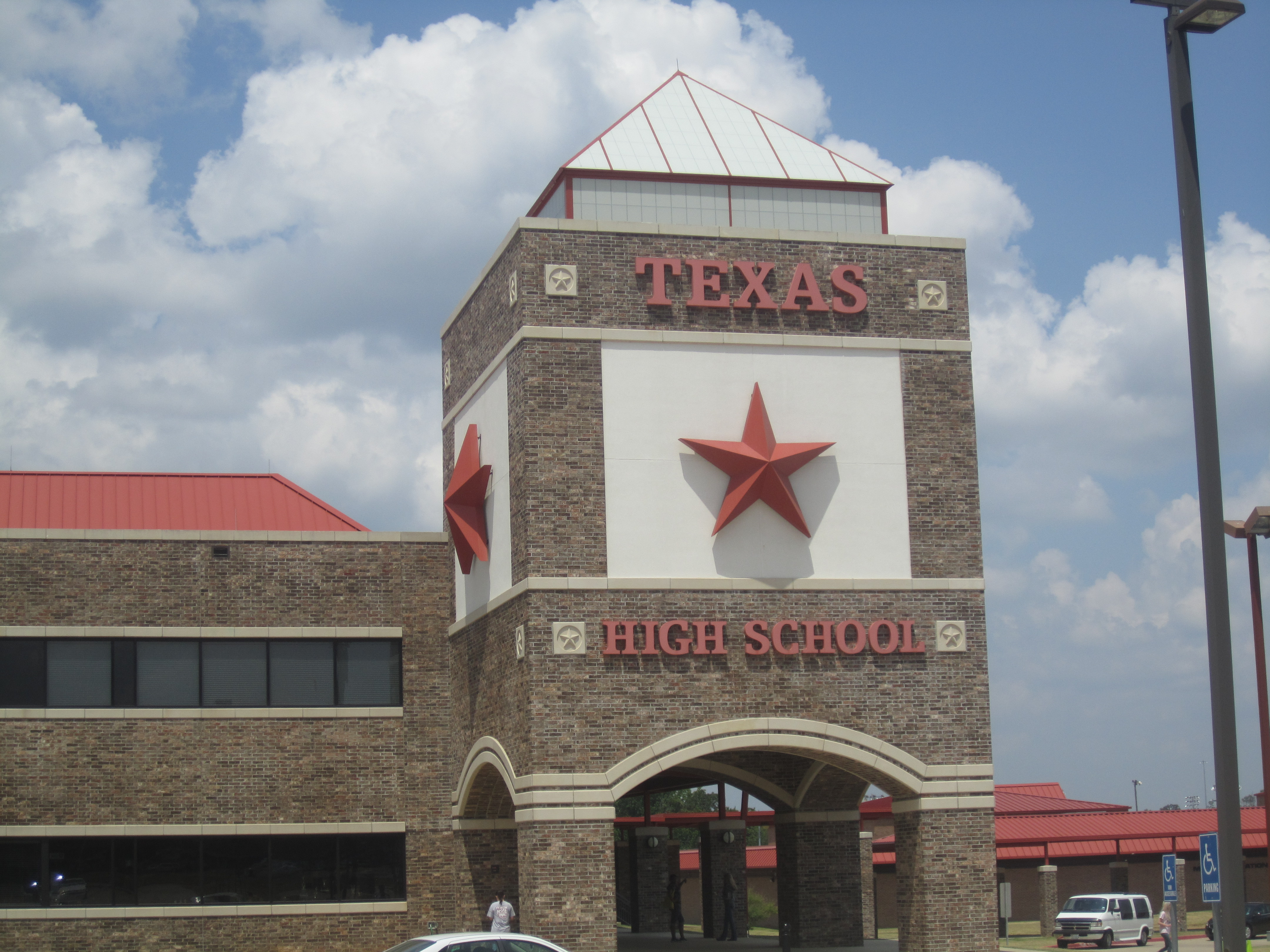

Location
- 4001 Summerhill Road; Texarkana, Texas 75503; United States; 33.455351°N 94.06543°W

Information
- Other name: THS
- Type: Public high school
- Motto: Tomorrow’s future at work today
- Established: 1889
- School district: Texarkana Independent School District
- NCES School ID: 484248004854
- Principal: Ben Renner
- Teaching staff: 162.30 (on an FTE basis)
- Grades: 9–12
- Enrollment: 1,762 (2023-2024)
- Student to teacher ratio: 10.86
- Colors: Orange, white, and black
- Athletics conference: UIL Class AAAAA
- Mascot: Tiger
- Nickname: Tigers
- Rival: Arkansas High School
- Newspaper: Tiger Times
- Yearbook: The Tiger
- Website: ths.txkisd.net
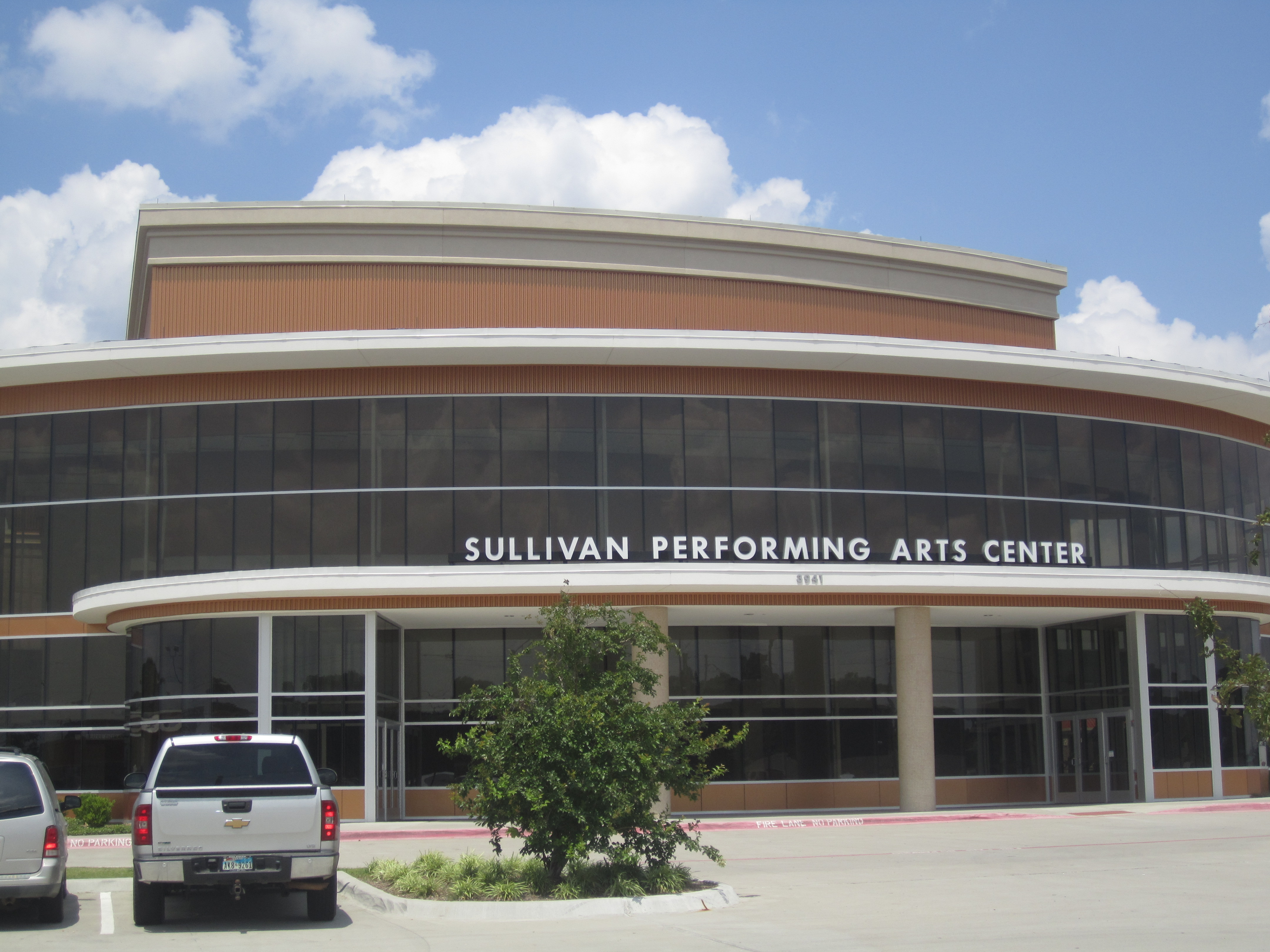
- Sullivan Performing Arts Center of the Texarkana Independent School District

Texas High School (THS) is a public high school in Texarkana, Texas, United States. It is part of the Texarkana Independent School District and is classified as a 5A school by the University Interscholastic League. For the 2024–2025 school year, the school was given a "B" by the Texas Education Agency.

== History ==
The first classes were held in 1889 for grades 7 through 11 and the first graduating class consisted of three students in 1890. In 1965, a $3 million bond was issued for a new high school on Kennedy Lane, just west of Summerhill Road, was approved. The facility was designed by noted architects Caudill Rowlett Scott and local architects Moore and Thomas. In 1969, the architecture firm was awarded the Outstanding School Architecture Award by the Texas Association of School Administrators and School Boards for its design.

== Athletics ==
The Texas Tigers compete in these sports: Baseball, Basketball, Cross Country, Football, Golf, Powerlifting, Soccer, Softball, Swimming and Diving, Tennis, Track and Field, and Volleyball.

=== Titles ===
- Baseball - 2009(4A)
- Football - 2002(4A/D1)
- Boys Swimming - 2003(4A)
- Boys Track - 2014(4A)
- Marching Band: Regional champions(2017), Regional Concert band Sweepstakes (2018)

5th place at Area Regional Contest (2022)

- Under the 2012-2014 football University Interscholastic League reclassification, Texas High competes in District 14 of classification 5A.
- The school won the 4A Division I state championship in 2002 for football, and won its first 4A state championship on June 11, 2009, for its baseball.

== Notable alumni ==
- Joe Anderson, former professional football player
- Miller Barber, professional golfer
- Carl Finch, guitarist, keyboardist, accordionist, vocalist, songwriter, and record producer
- Ike Forte, NFL player
- Cobi Hamilton, NFL player
- Slade Heathcott, MLB player
- Jack Jenkins, NFL player
- Nate Jones, NFL player
- J. D. Kimmel, NFL player
- Gary Kusin, entrepreneur
- Ryan Mallett, NFL player
- Julie Meadows, writer, web designer and former pornographic actress
- Rick Minter, college football coach
- Craig Monroe, MLB player
- Doyle Nix, NFL player
- Jerry Norton, NFL player
- Ross Perot, 1947, businessman and former presidential candidate, named TISD Distinguished Alumni in 2009
- Collin Raye, country music singer
- Bill Rogers, professional golfer
- Marjorie Scardino, business executive
- Aysel Teymurzadeh, singer
- Nathan Vasher, NFL player
- Renée Witterstaetter, artist and editor at Marvel Comics
