= Nate Jones (wide receiver) =

American football player (born 1985)

No. 18
- Position: Wide receiver

Personal information
- Born: December 30, 1985 (age 40); Texarkana, Texas, U.S.
- Listed height: 6 ft 1 in (1.85 m)
- Listed weight: 195 lb (88 kg)

Career information
- High school: Texas (Texarkana)
- College: Texas (2004–2007)
- NFL draft: 2008: undrafted

Career history
- Minnesota Vikings (2008)*; St. Louis Rams (2008–2009)
- * Offseason or practice squad member only
- Stats at Pro Football Reference

Nathan Dewayne Jones Jr. (born December 30, 1985) is an American former professional football player who was a wide receiver for the St. Louis Rams of the National Football League (NFL). He played college football for the Texas Longhorns.
