= Keith English (punter) =

American football player (1966–2010)

No. 8
- Position: Punter

Personal information
- Born: March 10, 1966; Denver, Colorado, U.S.
- Died: December 2, 2010 (aged 44); Littleton, Colorado, U.S.
- Listed height: 6 ft 3 in (1.91 m)
- Listed weight: 220 lb (100 kg)

Career information
- High school: Greeley West (Greeley, Colorado)
- College: Colorado
- NFL draft: 1989: undrafted

Career history
- Los Angeles Raiders (1989)*; Atlanta Falcons (1989)*; San Diego Chargers (1990)*; Los Angeles Rams (1990); Barcelona Dragons (1992)
- * Offseason or practice squad member only

Awards and highlights
- Consensus All-American (1988); First-team All-Big Eight (1988)

Career NFL statistics
- Punts: 68
- Punt yards: 2,663
- Longest punt: 58
- Stats at Pro Football Reference

Keith English (March 10, 1966 – December 2, 2010) was an American professional football player who was a punter for the Los Angeles Rams of the National Football League (NFL) in 1990. He appeared in 15 games for the Rams, punting 68 time for 2,663 yards. His longest punt was 58 yards, and his average was 39.2 yards. English played college football for the Colorado Buffaloes, earning consensus All-American honors in 1988. He was also a member of the Barcelona Dragons of the World League of American Football (WLAF).

English died on December 2, 2010, in his sleep. He had been working in a human resources role for a restaurant company.

== See also ==
- 1988 College Football All-America Team
