= Mike Utley =

American football player (born 1965)

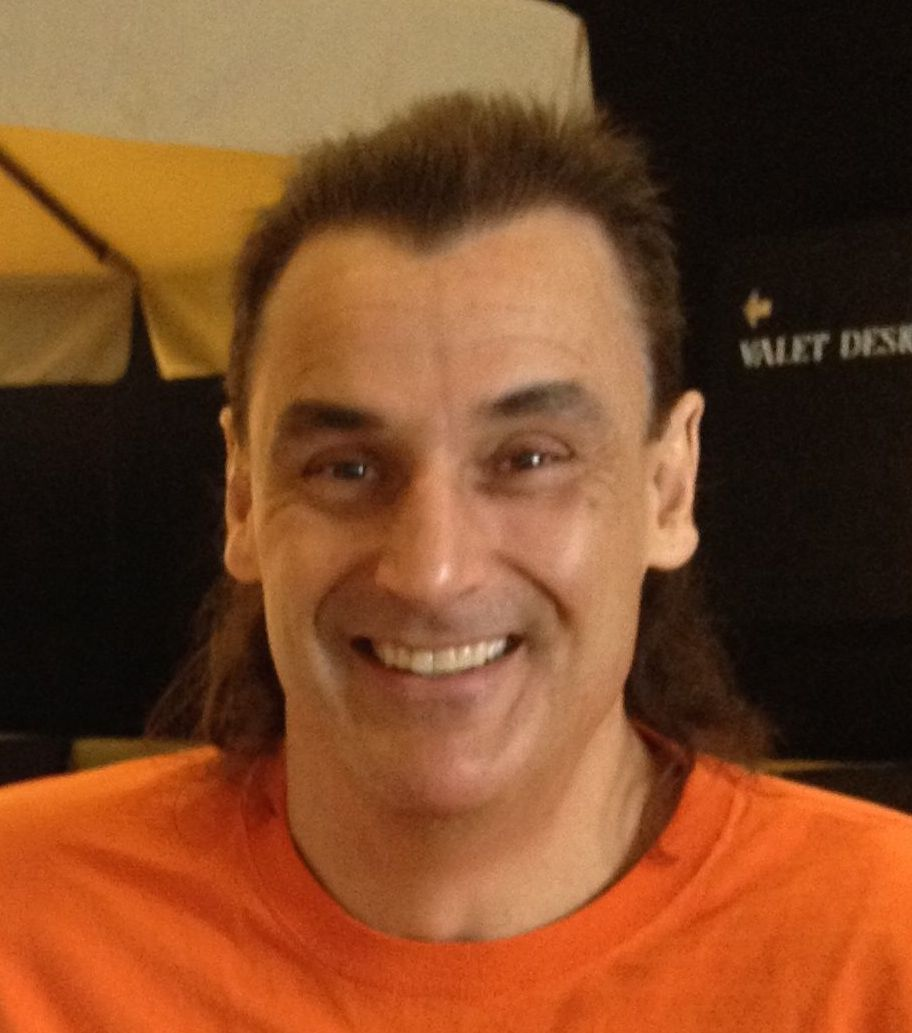
- Utley in Detroit in 2014

No. 60
- Position: Guard

Personal information
- Born: December 20, 1965 (age 60); Seattle, Washington, U.S.
- Listed height: 6 ft 6 in (1.98 m)
- Listed weight: 288 lb (131 kg)

Career information
- High school: John F. Kennedy Catholic (Burien, Washington)
- College: Washington State
- NFL draft: 1989: 3rd round, 59th overall pick

Career history
- Detroit Lions (1989–1991)

Awards and highlights
- George Halas Award (1992); Consensus All-American (1988); First-team All-Pac-10 (1988); Second-team All-Pac-10 (1987); Walter Camp Man of the Year (2006)

Career NFL statistics
- Games played: 32
- Games started: 17
- Fumble recoveries: 1
- Stats at Pro Football Reference
- College Football Hall of Fame

Michael Gerard Utley (born December 20, 1965) is an American former professional football player who was a guard for the Detroit Lions of the National Football League (NFL). He played college football for the Washington State Cougars, earning first-team All-American honors in 1988. Utley was selected in the third round of the 1989 NFL draft. He played for Detroit from 1989 until 1991, when he was paralyzed during a game.

== Early life and college ==
A graduate of Kennedy Catholic High School near Seattle, Utley attended Washington State University in Pullman and was a senior on the 1988 Cougar team which triumphed at the Aloha Bowl, Washington State's first bowl victory since the 1916 Rose Bowl. He was also named MVP; that season, he earned consensus All-American honors, only the second Cougar to do so. In 2004, Utley was elected into the WSU Athletic Hall of Fame, and was elected to the College Football Hall of Fame in 2016.

== Professional career ==
Utley was an offensive lineman with the Detroit Lions, picked in the third round of the 1989 NFL draft, 59th overall. In his rookie year, Utley became the starting right guard for the Lions. He started the first five games, but was injured in the fifth game against the Minnesota Vikings. Utley was put on injured reserve for the rest of the year.

In his second year in 1990, he fractured two ribs in the third preseason game, and was sidelined for the last preseason game and the first three regular season games. Utley came off the bench by playing in the second half of the next two games. Utley started in the sixth game, but dislocated his shoulder in the third quarter. He finished the season playing only in the second half of games.

=== Paralysis ===
In 1991, Utley started every game and was the full-time right guard until a paralysis injury on November 17 forced him to retire (he took part in 11 games up to that point). On the first play of the fourth quarter against the Los Angeles Rams, an injury to his sixth and seventh cervical vertebrae occurred while he was blocking the Rams’ David Rocker. Although he would later learn he was largely paralyzed from the chest down, Utley flashed the crowd a "thumbs up" as he was being taken off the field. The thumbs up sign has become the symbol for the Mike Utley Foundation, a foundation created in 1991 by Utley and his agent Bruce Allen to help seek a cure for paralysis.

Utley began rehabilitation at Craig Hospital, which specializes in spinal cord injuries. While the location of his injury defines him as having quadriplegia by the standard medical definition, he has essentially complete use of his upper extremities, making him functionally someone with paraplegia.

== Mike Utley Foundation ==
The mission of the Mike Utley Foundation is to financially support an effective function-restoring treatment for spinal cord injuries, to encourage through education that of adopting a rehabilitative lifestyle for the spinal cord injured and a public awareness of spinal cord injuries.
