= Darren Lewis (American football) =

American football player (1968–2024)

No. 33
- Position: Running back

Personal information
- Born: November 7, 1968; Dallas, Texas, U.S.
- Died: June 21, 2024 (aged 55)
- Listed height: 5 ft 10 in (1.78 m)
- Listed weight: 230 lb (104 kg)

Career information
- High school: Dallas Carter
- College: Texas A&M
- NFL draft: 1991: 6th round, 161st overall pick

Career history
- Chicago Bears (1991–1993)

Awards and highlights
- Consensus All-American (1990); First-team All-American (1988); SWC Offensive Player of the Year (1988); 2× First-team All-SWC (1988, 1990); Second-team All-SWC (1987)

Career NFL statistics
- Rushing att-yards: 112–431
- Receptions-yards: 22–201
- Touchdowns: 5
- Stats at Pro Football Reference

Darren Lewis (November 7, 1968 – June 21, 2024), nicknamed "Tank", was an American professional football player who was a running back for three seasons with the Chicago Bears of the National Football League (NFL) in the early 1990s. He played college football for the Texas A&M Aggies and was a consensus All-American in 1990. He was a sixth-round selection by the Bears in the 1991 NFL draft.

== Early life ==
Lewis was a star at Dallas football powerhouse Carter High School and was considered by some to be the top high school player in the class of 1987. While at Carter, Lewis was reported to be avoiding colleges in the Southwest Conference. "I don't want my football career to end because some other guy takes money," Lewis said.

== College career ==
Lewis attended Texas A&M University, and holds two of the top three rushing seasons in Aggies' history (1,692 in 1988 and 1,691 in 1990), behind Trayveon Williams (1,760 in 2018) and is the Aggie leader in career rushing yards (5,012 from 1987 to 1990). Lewis' 5,012 career rushing yards ranked him fifth on the NCAA's all-time career rushing list at the conclusion of his college career, but currently rank him 15th. His college career was filled with highlights and culminated with a spot on the first-team All-American team in 1990.

=== 1987 season ===
As a freshman, Lewis ran for 103 yards and two touchdowns against Baylor to lead the Aggies to a 34–10 victory, their first in Waco in 10 years. He ran for a freshman record 194 yards in a 42–24 victory over TCU, which was broken four years later by fellow Carter High alum, Greg Hill. He capped off the season by throwing a 24-yard halfback pass to Tony Thompson for a touchdown as the Aggies defeated Notre Dame, 35–10, in the 1988 Cotton Bowl Classic, and finished ranked in the NCAA top-10 for the second time in three years. His 668 rushing yards were second at the time only to Curtis Dickey for an Aggie freshman.

=== 1988 season ===
In his sophomore season of 1988, the Aggies were ineligible for the Southwest Conference championship due to NCAA violations, but an undaunted Lewis enjoyed a record-breaking season. He rushed 100 yards or more in each of the last 10 games of the season, setting a mark for both consecutive 100-yard games and most in one season, both still A&M records. His streak included strong road performances highlighted by a 192-yard showing in Fayetteville against the Arkansas Razorbacks and a 201-yard effort at the Astrodome against Houston. Against Texas, Lewis helped the Aggies jump to a 28–0 lead by scoring a 15-yard touchdown and adding a 36-yard run to set up a second score. Lewis ran for 212 yards that day as the Aggies went on to beat the Longhorns 28–24 for their fifth consecutive win against their main rival. His 1,692 yards rushing that year remained a Texas A&M record until broken in 2018 by Trayveon Williams and was second in the NCAA that year only to Oklahoma State's Barry Sanders. Lewis was named to the All-Southwest Conference team, his first of two such honors (1988 and 1990).

=== 1989 season ===
In 1989, Lewis helped new head coach R. C. Slocum get off to a good start by rushing for three touchdowns in a tight road victory against Texas Tech. Lewis also rushed for 120 yards against Houston and along with fullback Robert Wilson (115 rushing yards), helped control the ball and hold a Cougar offense that averaged nearly 60 points in their other games to just 13 against the Wrecking Crew. His strongest performance of the season was against Rice, in which he ran for 201 yards. Although his 961 total rushing yards were a down year by Lewis's standards, the total still ranked seventh best all-time at Texas A&M.

=== 1990 season ===
In 1990, Lewis etched his name into the A&M record books by finishing his college career with perhaps his finest season, as he led the country in rushing and was named a first-team All American. He set a scoring benchmark against Houston, as he ran for 124 yards and four rushing touchdowns, breaking three tackles on a 12-yard run for a score in the fourth quarter in a 36–31 loss to Houston. His 232 yards against Texas Tech is second all-time in Texas A&M history and was the highest total for an Aggie in 40 years. The Aggies would go on to demolish BYU and Heisman Trophy winner Ty Detmer, 65–14, in the Holiday Bowl behind Lewis' 104 rushing yards and two touchdowns, vaulting the Aggies from unranked to a No.15 finish in the AP Poll. Lewis finished his college career with over 5,000 rushing yards, which at the time was fifth all-time in NCAA history. His 45 career rushing touchdowns were a Texas A&M record for nearly 20 years until being broken by Jorvorskie Lane in 2008. His 27 career 100 yard games are still an A&M record and his five career 200-yard rushing games are both a Texas A&M and Southwest Conference record.

== Professional career ==
Pre-draft measurables
Height	Weight	Arm length	Hand span	Bench press
5 ft 10 1/8 in (1.78 m)	219 lb (99 kg)	29 1/2 in (0.75 m)	9 1/8 in (0.23 m)	11 reps

Despite his spectacular college career, Lewis' stock fell quickly after he tested positive for cocaine at the NFL Scouting Combine. He was selected in the sixth round of the 1991 NFL draft (161st overall pick) by the Chicago Bears. Lewis was the only player to test positive for drugs at the combine, and Chicago general manager Bill Tobin said that he thought a different player had tested positive. Tobin considered not inviting Lewis to minicamp.

Lewis spent portions of three seasons with the Bears. His best NFL season came in 1992, when he appeared in 16 games and gained 382 yards on 90 rushing attempts. In October 1993, Lewis was arrested and charged with battery following a domestic dispute. The Bears released Lewis later that month after the team signed running back Tim Worley. Chicago head coach Dave Wannstedt said that if something happened to starting running back Neal Anderson, he was not comfortable that Lewis could take over starting duties.

Lewis played in 33 games for the Bears, starting five of them and totaling 431 rushing yards in his career.

== Later life ==
Lewis continued to struggle with a cocaine addiction, which resulted in a divorce and the loss of his house. In August 2014, he pleaded guilty to three criminal charges related to armed robberies in the Dallas area. At his sentencing the following month, Lewis was given a 27-year term in federal prison. Lewis married Tammie Thibodeaux July 6, 2012.

Lewis died of cancer on June 21, 2024, at the age of 55.

== See also ==
- List of college football yearly rushing leaders
