= Mitchell Benson =

American football player (born 1967)

No. 95
- Position: Defensive tackle

Personal information
- Born: May 30, 1967 (age 59); Fort Worth, Texas, U.S.
- Listed height: 6 ft 4 in (1.93 m)
- Listed weight: 302 lb (137 kg)

Career information
- High school: Fort Worth (TX) Eastern Hills
- College: TCU
- NFL draft: 1989: 3rd round, 72nd overall pick

Career history
- Indianapolis Colts (1989–1990); San Diego Chargers (1991); Miami Dolphins (1993)*; Fort Worth Cavalry (1994); New Orleans Saints (1995)*; Milwaukee Mustangs (1995–1996); Texas Terror/Houston ThunderBears (1997–1998)
- * Offseason or practice squad member only

Awards and highlights
- First-team All-SWC (1988); Second-team All-SWC (1987)

Career NFL statistics
- Sacks: 1
- Stats at Pro Football Reference

Mitchell Benson (born May 30, 1967) is an American former professional football player who was a defensive tackle in the National Football League (NFL). He played for the Indianapolis Colts from 1989 to 1990 and for the San Diego Chargers in 1991. He was selected by the Colts in the third round of the 1989 NFL draft.
