= Cobi Hamilton =

American football player (born 1990)

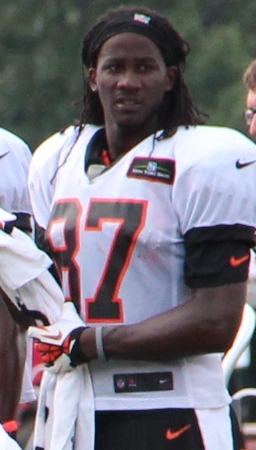
- Hamilton with the Cincinnati Bengals in 2013

No. 87, 83, 17
- Position: Wide receiver

Personal information
- Born: November 13, 1990 (age 35); Texarkana, Texas, U.S.
- Listed height: 6 ft 2 in (1.88 m)
- Listed weight: 201 lb (91 kg)

Career information
- High school: Texas (Texarkana)
- College: Arkansas (2009–2012)
- NFL draft: 2013: 6th round, 197th overall pick

Career history
- Cincinnati Bengals (2013–2014)*; Philadelphia Eagles (2014)*; Cincinnati Bengals (2014); Miami Dolphins (2015)*; Carolina Panthers (2016)*; Pittsburgh Steelers (2016); Houston Texans (2017); Arizona Cardinals (2018)*; Indianapolis Colts (2018)*
- * Offseason or practice squad member only

Awards and highlights
- Third-team All-American (2012); First-team All-SEC (2012)

Career NFL statistics
- Receptions: 18
- Receiving yards: 242
- Receiving touchdowns: 2
- Stats at Pro Football Reference

Cobi Hamilton (born November 13, 1990) is an American former professional football player who was a wide receiver in the National Football League (NFL). He played college football for the Arkansas Razorbacks. He was considered one of the top wide receiver prospects for the 2013 NFL draft, and was selected by the Cincinnati Bengals in the sixth round of the draft.

Hamilton was also a member of the Philadelphia Eagles, Miami Dolphins, Carolina Panthers, Pittsburgh Steelers, Houston Texans, Arizona Cardinals, and Indianapolis Colts.

== Early life ==
Hamilton attended Texas High School in Texarkana, Texas, where he set the Tigers’ single-season receiving yardage record as a senior with 64 receptions for 1,071 yards and 14 touchdowns. He was all-district and all-area in his career and he was named the All-Northeast Texas Offensive Player of the Year. As a junior, he had 29 receptions for 726 yards and seven touchdowns. He was a high school teammate of former Arkansas quarterback Ryan Mallett.

Hamilton was also a standout athlete for the Texas High School track team. He finished fourth in the 200 meters at the AAU National Junior Olympics, with a time of 21.41 seconds. He finished 4th in the 100 meters at the 2009 Region II-4A Championships, with a career-best time of 10.60 seconds. He also ran for the Arkansas track team. He ran a personal best of 21.09 in the 200 meter.

Considered a three-star recruit by Rivals.com, he was rated the No.63 wide receiver in the nation. He accepted a scholarship offer from Arkansas over offers from Missouri, Oklahoma State and Texas.

== College career ==
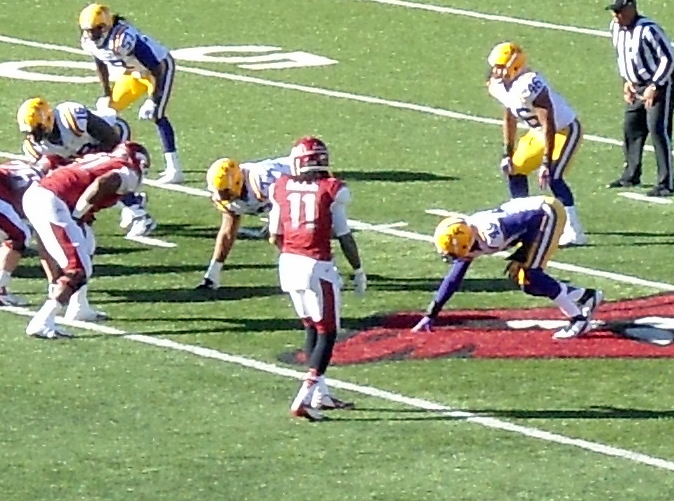
Hamilton (11) with the Arkansas Razorbacks.

Hamilton attended the University of Arkansas from 2009 to 2012. As a senior, he was an All-SEC selection after recording 90 receptions for 1,335 yards and five touchdowns. The receptions and yards were school records. On September 22, 2012, he set an SEC record for receiving yards in a game with 303. He finished his career with 175 receptions for 2,854 yards and 18 touchdowns.

== Professional career ==
Pre-draft measurables
Height	Weight	Arm length	Hand span	40-yard dash	10-yard split	20-yard split	20-yard shuttle	Three-cone drill	Vertical jump	Broad jump	Bench press
6 ft 1 3/4 in (1.87 m)	212 lb (96 kg)	32 1/2 in (0.83 m)	8 3/4 in (0.22 m)	4.56 s	1.63 s	2.65 s	4.31 s	7.09 s	29.5 in (0.75 m)	8 ft 11 in (2.72 m)	11 reps
All values from the NFL Combine

=== Cincinnati Bengals (first stint) ===
Hamilton was selected by the Cincinnati Bengals in the sixth round (197th overall) of the 2013 NFL draft. On May 10, 2013, the Bengals signed him to a four-year, $2.25 million contract. Hamilton was on the Bengals' practice squad for the entirety of his rookie season. He started his second season on the Bengals' practice squad.

=== Philadelphia Eagles ===
On September 10, 2014, Hamilton was signed to the Philadelphia Eagles' practice squad. On October 6, the Eagles released Hamilton.

=== Cincinnati Bengals (second stint) ===
On October 13, 2014, the Cincinnati Bengals re–signed Hamilton. On December 24, he was promoted to the 53-man roster. On July 30, 2015, Hamilton was waived by the Bengals.

=== Miami Dolphins ===
On August 1, 2015, Hamilton was claimed off waivers by the Miami Dolphins. On September 5, he was released by the Dolphins.

=== Carolina Panthers ===
The Carolina Panthers signed Hamilton to a futures contract on January 12, 2016. On July 25, Hamilton was released by the Panthers.

=== Pittsburgh Steelers ===
On August 5, 2016, the Pittsburgh Steelers signed Hamilton to a one-year, $460,000 contract. On September 3, he was released by the Steelers as part of final roster cuts. The next day, Hamilton was re–signed to the Steelers' practice squad. He was promoted to the active roster on October 15, and a day later, caught a 23-yard touchdown pass from Ben Roethlisberger, his first in the NFL, during a 15–30 loss to the Miami Dolphins. It was his first career start and he finished with two receptions for 36 receiving yards and a touchdown. The following week, he earned his second consecutive start and caught three passes for 36 receiving yards in a 16–27 loss to the New England Patriots. In the season finale against the Cleveland Browns, he caught the game-winning touchdown on a 26-yard pass from Landry Jones to win in overtime and finished the game with three receptions for 54 receiving yards and a touchdown. Hamilton was the Pittsburgh Steeler's sixth wide receiver on their depth chart throughout the season, behind Antonio Brown, Markus Wheaton, Sammie Coates, Darrius Heyward-Bey, and Eli Rogers. He finished the season with 17 receptions, 234 receiving yards, and two touchdowns in 11 games. Hamilton also had five kick returns for 83-yards and made one tackle on kickoff coverage.

On January 26, 2017, Hamilton was re-signed to a one-year contract by the Steelers. Hamilton entered training camp in 2017 competing with Coates, JuJu Smith-Schuster, Justin Hunter, Marcus Tucker, Rogers, and Heyward-Bey for a backup wide receiver position. On September 2, Hamilton was waived by the Steelers.

=== Houston Texans ===
On September 18, 2017, Hamilton was signed to the Houston Texans' practice squad. He was promoted to the active roster on November 22.

On March 21, 2018, Hamilton was waived by the Texans.

=== Arizona Cardinals ===
On March 22, 2018, Hamilton was claimed off waivers by the Arizona Cardinals. He was waived by the Cardinals on June 14.

=== Indianapolis Colts ===
On August 20, 2018, Hamilton signed with the Indianapolis Colts. He was waived by Indianapolis on September 1.
