= Johnnie Jackson (American football) =

American football player (born 1967)

No. 40
- Position: Safety

Personal information
- Born: January 11, 1967 (age 59); Harlingen, Texas, U.S.
- Listed height: 6 ft 1 in (1.85 m)
- Listed weight: 204 lb (93 kg)

Career information
- High school: Harlingen
- College: Houston
- NFL draft: 1989: 5th round, 122nd overall pick

Career history
- San Francisco 49ers (1989–1992); Green Bay Packers (1992)

Awards and highlights
- Super Bowl champion (XXIV); 2× First-team All-SWC (1987, 1988)

Career NFL statistics
- Interceptions: 3
- Sacks: 2
- Fumble recoveries: 4
- Stats at Pro Football Reference

Johnnie Bobby Jackson (born January 11, 1967) is an American former professional football player who was a safety in the National Football League (NFL). He attended Harlingen (Texas) High School from 1981 to 1985 and played quarterback. He played college football for the Houston Cougars and was selected by the San Francisco 49ers in the fifth round of the 1989 NFL draft with the 122nd overall pick. Jackson played four seasons in the NFL with the 49ers (1989–1992) and Green Bay Packers (1992).
