= Tyrone Thurman =

American football player (born 1966)

Profile
- Position: Wide receiver

Personal information
- Born: December 31, 1966 (age 59)
- Listed height: 5 ft 3 in (1.60 m)
- Listed weight: 150 lb (68 kg)

Career information
- High school: Robert E. Lee (Midland, Texas)
- College: Texas Tech
- NFL draft: 1989: undrafted

Career history
- Dallas Cowboys (1989)*; Ottawa Rough Riders (1990–1991); Dallas Texans (1992–1993); Las Vegas Sting (1994); Connecticut Coyotes (1995); Texas Terror (1996)
- * Offseason or practice squad member only

Awards and highlights
- First-team All-American (1988); 2× First-team All-SWC (1986, 1988); Smallest Division I (NCAA) football player during his career

Career AFL statistics
- Receptions: 263
- Receiving yards: 2,956
- Receiving TDs: 32
- Kick returns-yards: 224-3,774
- Kick return TDs: 7
- Stats at ArenaFan.com

Tyrone Thurman (born December 31, 1966) is an American former professional football player who was a wide receiver in the Canadian Football League (CFL) and Arena Football League (AFL). He played college football for the Texas Tech Red Raiders, earning first-team All-American honors as a kick returner in 1988.

== Career ==
=== High school ===
Thurman played at the running back position at Robert E. Lee High School in Midland, Texas under coach Spike Dykes.

=== College ===
Due to his small size at 5' 4" and 126 pounds, Thurman received little interest from Division I schools before being recruited to Texas Tech University with the hiring of his former high school coach Spike Dykes as the defensive coordinator for the Red Raiders in 1984. Thurman would play at the wide receiver position, but earned his accolades as a punt returner.

Thurman would play from 1985-1988, and earned Associated Press All-American 1st Team honors as a kick returner during his senior year in 1988. Thurman concluded his career holding several school records including longest punt return at 96 yards, return yards in a season (444 in 1986), returns in a career (126) and yards in a career (1,466). Several records still stand in 2013, with some having been broken by Mosi Tatupu Award winner Wes Welker.

=== Professional ===
Thurman went undrafted in 1989 before being signed as a free agent for the Dallas Cowboys. He was cut from the roster before the 1989 season began and spent several years in both the Canadian Football League and the Arena Football League playing for teams including the Ottawa Rough Riders, Dallas Texans (Arena), Las Vegas Sting, Connecticut Coyotes and Texas Terror.
