= John Roper (American football) =

American football player (born 1965)

No. 55, 56, 53
- Position: Linebacker

Personal information
- Born: October 4, 1965 (age 61); Houston, Texas, U.S.
- Listed height: 6 ft 4 in (1.93 m)
- Listed weight: 205 lb (93 kg)

Career information
- High school: Plano (Plano)
- College: Texas A&M
- NFL draft: 1989: 2nd round, 36th overall pick

Career history
- Chicago Bears (1989–1992); Dallas Cowboys (1993); Philadelphia Eagles (1993)

Awards and highlights
- Super Bowl champion (XXVIII); Consensus All-American (1987); SWC Defensive Player of the Year (1987); 2× First-team All-SWC (1987, 1988)

Career NFL statistics
- Sacks: 18
- Interceptions: 2
- Fumble recoveries: 1
- Stats at Pro Football Reference

John Alfred Roper (born October 4, 1965) is an American former professional football player who was a linebacker in the National Football League (NFL) for the Chicago Bears, Dallas Cowboys and the Philadelphia Eagles. He played college football for the Texas A&M Aggies, earning consensus All-American honors in 1987. Roper was selected by the Bears in the second round of the 1989 NFL draft. He was on the Cowboys' Super Bowl XXVIII championship team.

== Early life ==
At Texas A&M University, Roper was one of the best to play defensively in school history according to his coach, Jackie Sherrill.

In 1987, he was the Southwest Conference Defensive Player of the Year, as well as an All-American. In his four years as an Aggie, they compiled a record of 36 wins and just 12 losses: three conference championships; and twice they were victorious in the Cotton Bowl.

Roper, a two-time All-Southwest Conference and a consensus All-American, was at the heart of that success. Before heading to the NFL, he began a tradition that became known all across college football. It was during his career the famed moniker of the “Wrecking Crew” was born.

His career tackles for a loss of 68 while at Texas A&M ranked him 8th in the NCAA at the conclusion of his college football career (currently ranks 14th). In addition, his career sack total of 36 ranked him 9th in the NCAA at the conclusion of his college football career (currently ranks 24th).

He is one of the greatest linebackers in Texas A&M University history and was inducted into the Texas A&M Athletic Hall of Fame in 2009.

== Professional career ==
=== Chicago Bears ===
Roper was selected in the second round (36th overall) of the 1989 NFL draft by the Chicago Bears.

His best season came in 1991, when started all 16 games at right outside linebacker, finishing with 90 tackles and 8 sacks (second on the team). A pulled hamstring in the season finale at San Francisco forced him to miss the playoff loss against the Dallas Cowboys. He was also voted NFC player of the week, after registering 11 tackles, 2 sacks and one pass defensed in a 21–20 win against the Tampa Bay Buccaneers. The next year, although he started 13 games, his sack production dropped to 2.5 sacks.

In 1993, former Dallas Cowboys defensive coordinator Dave Wannstedt became the new head coach for the Chicago Bears and implemented a 4–3 defense where Roper and other linebackers already in the roster were no longer a good fit. He was eventually traded to the Cowboys along with tight end Kelly Blackwell and safety Markus Paul, in exchange for linebacker Vinson Smith, Barry Minter and a sixth-round draft pick in the 1995 NFL draft.

=== Dallas Cowboys ===
It has been mentioned that Dallas Cowboys head coach Jimmy Johnson accepted the trade to help close friend Dave Wannstedt in his new job, with all of the players received eventually being waived.

Roper didn't fit the Cowboys 4–3 defense either, which was the same system that was being implemented in Chicago. He recorded 3 tackles and 2 sacks in three games with the team, playing mainly on special teams.

In Cowboys lore, Roper is known for being cut by Johnson, in order to send the team a message, after he fell asleep during a special teams meeting prior to their October 17 game against the San Francisco 49ers in 1993.

=== Philadelphia Eagles ===
The Philadelphia Eagles after previously in the year trying twice to trade for Roper, signed him as a free agent on November 17, 1993. He was waived in a salary cap move on June 3, 1994.
