= Robert Blackmon =

American football player (born 1967)

No. 25
- Position: Safety

Personal information
- Born: May 12, 1967 (age 59); Bay City, Texas, U.S.
- Listed height: 6 ft 0 in (1.83 m)
- Listed weight: 198 lb (90 kg)

Career information
- High school: Van Vleck (Van Vleck, Texas)
- College: Baylor
- NFL draft: 1990: 2nd round, 34th overall pick

Career history
- Seattle Seahawks (1990–1996); Indianapolis Colts (1997–1998)

Awards and highlights
- All-Pro selection (1995); PFWA All-Rookie Team (1990); First-team All-SWC (1987), (1989); Second-team All-SWC (1988)

Career NFL statistics
- Interceptions: 17
- Interception yards: 262
- Sacks: 10.5
- Stats at Pro Football Reference

Robert James Blackmon (born May 12, 1967) is an American former professional football player who was a safety in the National Football League (NFL). He was selected by the Seattle Seahawks in the second round of the 1990 NFL draft. He played college football for the Baylor Bears.

Blackmon also played for the Indianapolis Colts.
