= Kendall Trainor =

American football player (born 1967)

Profile
- Position: Kicker

Personal information
- Born: June 8, 1967 (52 years); Fredonia, Kansas, U.S.

Career information
- College: Arkansas (1987–1988)

Awards and highlights
- Consensus All-American (1988); First-team All-SWC (1988); Southwest Conference Champion (1988)

Kendall Trainor (born July 8, 1967) is a former All-American placekicker for the University of Arkansas in 1988.

Trainor was an All-State selection for Fredonia High School under head coach Gene John and helped them to the 1983 Class 4A State Championship before he graduated in 1985.

In college, he led the nation in field goals per game as a senior in 1988 under head coach Ken Hatfield. Trainor, in addition to setting five school records, including most FG in a game, was a first-team All-Southwest Conference selection following his senior year and a first-team All-American on teams selected by the American Football Coaches Association, the Associated Press, the Walter Camp Foundation and The Sporting News. In 1989 he set the Southwest Conference Record for most successful FGs in a row with 24 and help the team win the Southwest Conference Championship.

Trainor was also a letterman on the Razorback baseball team under coach Norm DeBryn.

Trainor was drafted by the Phoenix Cardinals in the 9th Round of the 1989 NFL draft (#234 overall) with whom he signed, but he was released at the end of training camp that August.

In 1991, Trainor was the first kicker drafted in the World League of American Football draft, by the Sacramento Surge. After playing 6 games for the Surge in 1991, he moved to the New York/New Jersey Knights. With the Knights he hit 12/14 extra point attempts and 9/16 field goal attempts, finishing the inaugural season of the World League with 39 points, fifth overall among kickers. He was also the Surge's punter that year, punting 29 times for 946 yards. He stayed with the Knights for the 1992 season, kicking 22/25 extra points and 6/11 Field goals for 40 total points.

In 2015 Trainor was inducted into the Arkansas Sports Hall of Honor.
