= Zach Hocker =

American football player (born 1991)

No. 2
- Position: Placekicker

Personal information
- Born: August 23, 1991 (age 35); Russellville, Arkansas, U.S.
- Listed height: 6 ft 0 in (1.83 m)
- Listed weight: 191 lb (87 kg)

Career information
- High school: Russellville
- College: Arkansas
- NFL draft: 2014: 7th round, 228th overall pick

Career history
- Washington Redskins (2014)*; Miami Dolphins (2015)*; New Orleans Saints (2015); St. Louis Rams (2015); Cincinnati Bengals (2016)*; Tampa Bay Buccaneers (2017)*
- * Offseason or practice squad member only

Awards and highlights
- Second-team All-SEC (2013)

Career NFL statistics
- Field goals: 10
- Field goals attempted: 14
- Field goal %: 71.4
- Longest field goal: 51
- Touchbacks: 9
- Stats at Pro Football Reference

Zach Hocker (born August 23, 1991) is an American former professional football player who was a placekicker in the National Football League (NFL). He played college football for the Arkansas Razorbacks and was selected by the Washington Redskins in the seventh round of the 2014 NFL draft. He was also a member of the Miami Dolphins, New Orleans Saints, St. Louis Rams, Cincinnati Bengals, and Tampa Bay Buccaneers.

== Early life ==
Hocker was a two-time All-State player at Russellville High School in Arkansas and was inducted into the school's Athletic Hall of Fame. He played college football at the University of Arkansas from 2010 to 2013 and made 61 of 79 field goal attempts during that time.

== Professional career ==
=== Washington Redskins ===
Hocker signed a four-year, $2.1 million contract with the Washington Redskins on May 16, 2014, but was released on August 30, 2014 during final roster cuts before the start of the 2014 season in favor of Kai Forbath.

=== Miami Dolphins ===
Hocker signed a future deal with the Miami Dolphins on January 8, 2015, but was waived three months later.

=== New Orleans Saints ===
On May 17, 2015, the New Orleans Saints signed Hocker, who beat out Dustin Hopkins to start the 2015 season as the Saints kicker. However, Hocker went on to miss 4 of 13 field goals over the first six games of the season, including a potentially game-winning field goal against the Dallas Cowboys in Week 4. The Saints consequently released Hocker on October 19, 2015 and signed Forbath. Forbath had earlier been released by the Washington Redskins and been replaced with Hopkins, whom Hocker beat in camp. ESPN referred to the situation as a continuation of the "NFL's kicking carousel."

=== St. Louis Rams ===
On November 28, 2015, Hocker signed with the St. Louis Rams after their regular kicker, Greg Zuerlein, was injured. Hocker was active in two games before Zuerlein returned, and was released on December 15, 2015.

=== Cincinnati Bengals ===
On January 5, 2016, the Cincinnati Bengals signed Hocker to a futures contract. On August 29, 2016, Hocker was waived by the Bengals.

=== Tampa Bay Buccaneers ===
On August 13, 2017, Hocker was signed by the Tampa Bay Buccaneers. He was released on September 2, 2017.
