= James Rouse (American football) =

American football player (born 1966)

No. 30
- Position: Running back

Personal information
- Born: December 18, 1966 (age 59); Little Rock, Arkansas, U.S.
- Listed height: 6 ft 0 in (1.83 m)
- Listed weight: 220 lb (100 kg)

Career information
- High school: Parkview (Little Rock)
- College: Arkansas
- NFL draft: 1990: 8th round, 200th overall pick

Career history
- Chicago Bears (1990–1991); Atlanta Falcons (1993)*
- * Offseason or practice squad member only

Awards and highlights
- Second-team All-SWC (1987)

Career NFL statistics
- Rushing yards: 130
- Rushing average: 3
- Receptions: 15
- Receiving yards: 93
- Stats at Pro Football Reference

James David Rouse (born December 18, 1966) is an American former professional football player who was a running back for the Chicago Bears of the National Football League (NFL). He played college football for the Arkansas Razorbacks.

== Early life and college ==
James Rouse was a high school star at Little Rock Parkview High School (now known as Parkview Arts and Science Magnet High School), and later signed with the Arkansas Razorbacks under coach Ken Hatfield. Rouse played four years for the Razorbacks (1985, 1987–1989), rushing for 2887 yards and 39 touchdowns, while sharing the backfield with Barry Foster. In the 1987 season Rouse ran for 1004 yards and seventeen touchdowns, giving the Razorbacks their first 1,000-yard rusher since Ben Cowins in 1978. Rouse was a key member on the Razorbacks' back-to-back Cotton Bowl Classic appearances following the 1988 and 1989 seasons. Rouse also played in the Holiday Bowl as a freshman and the Liberty Bowl as a redshirt sophomore. In the four bowl games, Rouse rushed for a total of 281 yards on 57 carries (4.9 avg.) and one touchdown, including a 134-yard effort in the 1990 Cotton Bowl Classic. Rouse was named to Arkansas' All-Decade Team for the 1980s as a running back.

== Professional career ==
Rouse was selected in the 8th round of the 1990 NFL draft by the Chicago Bears, ahead of notable players such as Terry Allen and Marvcus Patton. In two years with the Bears, Rouse had only 130 yards rushing, but was a regular contributor in his short career. He played in all sixteen games as a rookie and saw action in fourteen games in 1991, including four starts at fullback in place of an injured Brad Muster.
