= Quinn Grovey =

American football player (born 1968)

Profile
- Position: Quarterback

Personal information
- Born: July 19, 1968 (age 58)
- Listed height: 5 ft 11 in (1.80 m)
- Listed weight: 175 lb (79 kg)

Career information
- High school: Duncan (Duncan, OK)
- College: Arkansas

Awards and highlights
- First-team All-SWC (1988)

Quinn Grovey (born July 19, 1968) is an American former football quarterback for the Arkansas Razorbacks football team from 1987 to 1990.

== Early life ==
Grovey grew up in Duncan, Oklahoma. He was named the player of the year in Oklahoma his senior season when he rushed for 700 yards and passed for 900. He led his teams to two state championships. Grovey chose to go to University of Arkansas over the University of Oklahoma and Oklahoma State University.

== College career ==
Grovey was a four-year letterwinner and a three-year starter at Arkansas from 1988 to 1990. He led the team to Southwest Conference championships in 1988 and 1989. Overall, he passed for 4,496 yards and rushed for 1,746. He was later named to the Arkansas All-Century team and Alltel Southeastern Conference Football Legends.

== Life after college ==
Grovey played briefly in the CFL after leaving Arkansas. After retiring from football, he started working for Walmart in 1994. In 1999, he became a regional manager for Home Depot and currently provides color commentary on the Razorbacks Sports Network radio broadcasts. Grovey previously worked 19 seasons as the Razorbacks' sideline announcer.

In 2007, he married his wife, Stacy, and has a step-daughter, Kelsey.
