= 1988 All-America college football team =

Official list of the best college football players of 1988

The 1988 All-America college football team is composed of college football players who were selected as All-Americans by various organizations and writers that chose College Football All-America Teams in 1988. The National Collegiate Athletic Association (NCAA) recognizes five selectors as "official" for the 1988 season. They are: (1) the American Football Coaches Association (AFCA); (2) the Associated Press (AP) selected based on the votes of sports writers at AP newspapers; (3) the Football Writers Association of America (FWAA); (4) the United Press International (UPI) selected based on the votes of sports writers at UPI newspapers; and (5) the Walter Camp Football Foundation (WC). Other notable selectors included Football News (FN), the Gannett News Service (GNS), the Newspaper Enterprise Association (NEA), Scripps Howard (SH), and The Sporting News (TSN).

== Consensus All-Americans ==
The following charts identify the NCAA-recognized consensus All-Americans for the year 1988 and displays which first-team designations they received.

=== Offense ===
Name	Position	School	Number	Official	Other
Barry Sanders	Running back	Oklahoma State	5/4/9	AFCA, AP, FWAA, UPI, WC	GNS, NEA, SH, TSN
Tony Mandarich	Offensive tackle	Michigan State	5/3/8	AFCA, AP, FWAA, UPI, WC	GNS, SH, TSN
Anthony Phillips	Offensive guard	Oklahoma	5/1/6	AFCA, AP, FWAA, UPI, WC	NEA
Jason Phillips	Wide receiver	Houston	4/1/5	AFCA, AP, FWAA, UPI	SH
Mike Utley	Offensive guard	Washington State	4/1/5	AFCA, AP, FWAA, UPI	SH
Hart Lee Dykes	Wide receiver	Oklahoma State	3/3/6	AP, UPI, WC	NEA, SH, TSN
Mark Stepnoski	Offensive guard	Pittsburgh	3/3/6	AFCA, FWAA, WC	GNS, SH, TSN
Anthony Thompson	Running back	Indiana	3/2/5	FWAA, UPI, WC	NEA, TSN
Tim Worley	Running back	Georgia	3/2/5	AFCA, FWAA, WC	GNS, SH
Troy Aikman	Quarterback	UCLA	2/2/4	UPI, WC	GNS, TSN
Steve Walsh	Quarterback	Miami	2/1/3	AP, FWAA	GNS
Marv Cook	Tight end	Iowa	2/1/3	AFCA, UPI	GNS
Jake Young	Center	Nebraska	2/0/2	AP, FWAA	
John Vitale	Center	Michigan	2/0/2	UPI, WC	

=== Defense ===
Name	Position	School	Number	Official	Other
Mark Messner	Defensive tackle	Michigan	5/4/9	AFCA, AP, FWAA, UPI, WC	GNS, NEA, SH, TSN
Broderick Thomas	Linebacker	Nebraska	5/4/9	AFCA, AP, FWAA, UPI, WC	GNS, NEA, SH, TSN
Derrick Thomas	Linebacker	Alabama	5/4/9	AFCA, AP, FWAA, UPI, WC	GNS, NEA, SH, TSN
Deion Sanders	Defensive back	Florida State	5/4/9	AFCA, AP, FWAA, UPI, WC	GNS, NEA, SH, TSN
Tracy Rocker	Defensive tackle	Auburn	5/3/8	AFCA, AP, FWAA, UPI, WC	GNS, SH, TSN
Donnell Woolford	Defensive back	Clemson	4/3/7	AFCA, FWAA, UPI, WC	GNS, SH, TSN
Michael Stonebreaker	Linebacker	Notre Dame	3/3/6	AP, FWAA, WC	GNS, NEA, SH
Darryl Henley	Defensive back	UCLA	3/2/5	AFCA, UPI, WC	SH, TSN
Louis Oliver	Defensive back	Florida	3/2/5	AFCA, AP, WC	NEA, SH
Wayne Martin	Defensive tackle	Arkansas	3/1/4	AP, FWAA, UPI	TSN
Bill Hawkins	Defensive end	Miami	2/1/3	AFCA, WC	SH
Frank Stams	Defensive end	Notre Dame	2/0/2	AP, UPI	

=== Special teams ===
Name	Position	School	Number	Official	Other
Kendall Trainor	Kicker	Arkansas	4/2/6	AFCA, AP, UPI, WC	SH, TSN
Keith English	Punter	Colorado	3/3/6	AP, UPI, WC	GNS, NEA, TSN

== Offense ==
=== Quarterbacks ===
- Troy Aikman, UCLA (CFHOF) (UPI-1, WC, GNS, TSN)
- Steve Walsh, Miami (AP-1, FWAA, GNS)
- Rodney Peete, USC (AP-2; AFCA, GNS, SH)
- Major Harris, West Virginia (AP-3; GNS)

=== Running backs ===
- Barry Sanders, Oklahoma State (CFHOF) (AFCA, AP-1, FWAA, UPI-1, WC, GNS, SH, TSN)
- Anthony Thompson, Indiana (UPI-1, AP-2; FWAA, WC, TSN)
- Tim Worley, Georgia (AP-2; AFCA, FWAA, WC, GNS, SH)
- Darren Lewis, Texas A&M (AP-1, GNS, TSN)
- Cleveland Gary, Miami (Fla.) (AP-3; FN)
- Tony Boles, Michigan (AP-3)

=== Wide receivers ===
- Hart Lee Dykes, Oklahoma State (AP-1, UPI-1, WC, SH, TSN)
- Jason Phillips, Houston (AFCA, AP-1, UPI-1, FWAA, SH)
- Erik Affholter, USC (AFCA, AP-2, TSN)
- Clarkston Hines, Duke (AP-2, FWAA)
- Naz Worthen, North Carolina State (GNS)
- Andre Rison, Michigan State (GNS)
- Boo Mitchell, Vanderbilt (AP-3)
- Kendal Smith, Utah State (AP-3)

=== Tight ends ===
- Marv Cook, Iowa (AFCA, AP-2, UPI-1, GNS)
- Troy Sadowski, Georgia (WC)
- Wesley Walls, Mississippi (AP-1)
- Walter Reeves, Auburn (TSN)
- Charles Arbuckle, UCLA (SH)
- Scott Galbraith, USC (AP-3)

=== Centers ===
- Jake Young, Nebraska (AP-1, FWAA)
- John Vitale, Michigan (UPI-1, AP-2; WC)
- Jeff Uhlenhake, Ohio State (TSN)
- Bern Brostek, Washington (GNS)
- Jeff Garnica, North Carolina (AP-3)

=== Offensive guards ===
- Anthony Phillips, Oklahoma (AFCA, AP-1, FWAA, UPI-1, WC)
- Mike Utley, Washington State (AFCA, AP-1, UPI-1, FWAA, SH)
- Mark Stepnoski, Pittsburgh (AFCA, AP-2; FWAA, WC, GNS, SH, TSN)
- Steve Wisniewski, Penn State (AFCA, GNS, TSN)
- Rick Phillips, West Virginia (AP-2 [OT]; SH)
- Joe Wolf, Boston College (AP-2)
- Freddie Childress, Arkansas (AP-3)
- John Stroia, West Virginia (AP-3)

=== Offensive tackles ===
- Tony Mandarich, Michigan State (AFCA, AP-1, FWAA, UPI-1, WC, GNS, SH, TSN)
- Andy Heck, Notre Dame (AP-1, UPI-1, TSN)
- Pat Tomberlin, Florida State (AP-2, WC, SH)
- Tom Ricketts, Pittsburgh (GNS)
- Kevin Haverdink, Western Michigan (AP-3)
- Jim Thompson, Auburn (AP-3)

== Defense ==
=== Defensive ends ===
- Bill Hawkins, Miami (AFCA, WC, SH)
- Frank Stams, Notre Dame (AP-1, UPI-1)
- Trace Armstrong, Florida (GNS, TSN)

=== Defensive tackles ===
- Mark Messner, Michigan (AFCA, AP-1, FWAA, UPI-1, WC, GNS, SH, TSN)
- Tracy Rocker, Auburn (CFHOF) (AFCA, AP-1, FWAA, UPI-1, WC, GNS, SH, TSN)
- Wayne Martin, Arkansas (AP-1, UPI-1, FWAA, TSN)
- Tim Ryan, USC (FWAA)
- Dave Haight, Iowa (WC)
- Benji Roland, Auburn (TSN [NG])

=== Linebackers ===
- Broderick Thomas, Nebraska (AFCA, AP-1 [DE], FWAA, UPI-1, WC, GNS, SH, TSN)
- Derrick Thomas, Alabama (CFHOF) (AFCA, AP-1, FWAA, UPI-1, WC, GNS, SH, TSN)
- Michael Stonebreaker, Notre Dame (CFHOF) (AP-1, FWAA, WC, GNS, SH)
- Keith DeLong, Tennessee (AP-1 UPI-1, GNS, TSN)
- Percy Snow, Michigan State (TSN)
- Carnell Lake, UCLA (FWAA)
- Britt Hager, Texas (AFCA, SH)
- Jerry Olsavsky, Pittsburgh (AFCA)

=== Defensive backs ===
- Deion Sanders, Florida State (CFHOF) (AFCA, AP-1, FWAA, UPI-1, WC, GNS, SH, TSN)
- Donnell Woolford, Clemson (AFCA, FWAA, UPI-1, WC, GNS, SH, TSN)
- Darryl Henley, UCLA (AFCA, UPI-1, WC, SH, TSN)
- Louis Oliver, Florida (AFCA, AP-1, WC, SH)
- Markus Paul, Syracuse (AP-1, FWAA, TSN)
- Mark Carrier, USC (UPI-1)
- Greg Jackson, LSU (GNS)
- Bubba McDowell, Miami (Fla) (GNS)

== Special teams ==
=== Kickers ===
- Kendall Trainor, Arkansas (AFCA, AP-1, UPI-1, WC, SH, TSN)
- Chris Jacke, UTEP (FWAA, GNS)

=== Punters ===
- Keith English, Colorado (AP-1, UPI-1, WC, GNS, TSN)
- Pat Thompson, BYU (AFCA, FWAA, SH)

=== Returners ===
- Tyrone Thurman, Texas Tech (AP-1)
- James Henry, Southern Mississippi (TSN)

== Key ==
- **Bold** – Consensus All-American
- -1 – First-team selection
- -2 – Second-team selection
- -3 – Third-team selection
- CFHOF = College Football Hall of Fame inductee

=== Official selectors ===
- AFCA – American Football Coaches Association (AFCA), selected by the members of the AFCA for the Kodak All-America team
- AP – Associated Press
- FWAA – Football Writers Association of America
- UPI – United Press International
- WC – Walter Camp Football Foundation

=== Other selectors ===
- FN – Football News
- GNS – Gannett News Service
- NEA – Newspaper Enterprise Association, in conjunction with World Almanac
- SH – Scripps Howard
- TSN – The Sporting News

== See also ==
- 1988 All-Atlantic Coast Conference football team
- 1988 All-Big Eight Conference football team
- 1988 All-Big Ten Conference football team
- 1988 All-Pacific-10 Conference football team
- 1988 All-SEC football team
