= Barry Foster (American football) =

American football player (born 1968)

No. 29
- Position: Running back

Personal information
- Born: December 8, 1968 (age 57); Hurst, Texas, U.S.
- Listed height: 5 ft 10 in (1.78 m)
- Listed weight: 223 lb (101 kg)

Career information
- High school: Duncanville (Duncanville, Texas)
- College: Arkansas
- NFL draft: 1990: 5th round, 128th overall pick

Career history
- Pittsburgh Steelers (1990–1994); Carolina Panthers (1995)*; Cincinnati Bengals (1995)
- * Offseason or practice squad member only

Awards and highlights
- First-team All-Pro (1992); 2× Pro Bowl (1992, 1993); Second-team All-SWC (1988)

Career NFL statistics
- Rushing yards: 3,943
- Rushing average: 4.3
- Rushing touchdowns: 26
- Stats at Pro Football Reference

Barry Foster (born December 8, 1968) is an American former professional football player who was a running back in the National Football League (NFL). He played college football for the Arkansas Razorbacks.

== Summary ==
Foster attended Duncanville High School in Texas. He went on to attend the University of Arkansas, where he played fullback for the Razorbacks alongside a pair of tailbacks, James Rouse and E. D. Jackson, in Ken Hatfield's wishbone offense. Foster wore #18 for his entire time at Arkansas (1987–1989). Foster helped the Razorbacks win back-to-back Southwest Conference championships in 1988 and 1989, making consecutive trips to the Cotton Bowl Classic in Dallas on New Year's Day. The Razorbacks finished each of these seasons with a 10–2 record, and were ranked in the final polls' top 15. After only three collegiate seasons, he decided to forgo his senior year after Hatfield left to coach Clemson, and entered the 1990 NFL Draft. He was selected by the Pittsburgh Steelers with the 19th pick of the fifth round (128th overall) by Chuck Noll. Foster was 5'10", weighed 223 lbs, and wore #29 for the Steelers.

Barry Foster's NFL career was cut short because of injuries. For his career, he carried the football 915 times for 3,943 yards, a 4.3-yard per carry average, caught 93 passes for 804 receiving yards, scored 28 touchdowns, and went to 2 Pro Bowls. His 1,690 rushing yards in 1992 remain a Steelers single-season rushing record. Foster was known in the 90's as "The NFL's Other Barry.", a reference to himself and Barry Sanders.

== Playing career ==
In 1990, Foster was used primarily on special teams during his rookie season. It was during this first season that he made a catastrophic blunder in a game that Steelers played against the 49ers on October 21. He was positioned to receive a kick-off, but did not field the kick because he thought that the ball would be downed by the coverage team, not realizing that the dead ball rule only applies to punts and that the kick was a de facto fumble when he didn't secure it. The result was a San Francisco recovery that eventually lead to a Steelers loss. This is one of the handful of times in NFL history that a player neglected to field a kick-off on the return team.

His second NFL season, in 1991, started out with a 121-yard rushing game with a 56-yard touchdown run against the Buffalo Bills in week 2 but he sprained his ankle a few weeks later and missed five games.

In 1992, Barry Foster got the Bill Cowher era going in Pittsburgh after two seasons on the bench backing up former first-round pick Tim Worley. After Worley was suspended the entire year from the NFL due to missing two mandatory drug tests, Foster got the starting nod and rushed for a Steelers single season record 1,690 yards and also broke Franco Harris's team record for 100-yard games in a season with 12, that also tied Eric Dickerson's NFL record for 100-yard games. He was voted to the Pro Bowl that year and also scored 11 touchdowns. Foster finished 1992 as the AFC's top rusher and second to Emmitt Smith by 23 yards for the rushing title. Foster's strong season, combined with the struggling Worley being traded to the Chicago Bears after the season, led to Foster being the unquestioned starter moving forward.

In 1993, Foster's season started off strong, but injuries limited him to 711 yards in nine games with eight touchdowns. Despite the injuries, Foster still made the Pro Bowl for the second year in a row.

In 1994, Foster played 11 games (again limited due to injuries) and gained 851 yards. During a September 18, 1994 game against the Indianapolis Colts, he rushed for 179 yards on 31 carries and a touchdown. He added three catches for another 13 yards – giving him more yards than the entire Colts’ offense. The game was billed as Barry Foster versus Marshall Faulk, but it was no contest. “He (Faulk) wasn't the challenge,” said Foster. “I respond to the challenge the defense gives me". The injury to Foster that year opened the door for rookie running back Bam Morris to take over.

The 1994 AFC Championship game would not only be Foster's last game in a Steeler uniform, but his last NFL game. Trailing the San Diego Chargers 17–13, the Steelers were mounting the go-ahead drive. On the last play of the game, a fourth down and goal from the three-yard line, Foster was in primarily as a blocker for Neil O'Donnell, but when San Diego sent no pass rush, Foster ran out of the backfield to become an eligible receiver on a short underneath route. The throw from O'Donnell was delayed and gave San Diego linebacker Dennis Gibson the chance to reach over Foster and bat the ball to the ground as Foster was falling to the turf of Three Rivers stadium. That play ended the Steelers' season. O'Donnell later stated that Foster was his fourth read on that play.

In 1995, Barry Foster had become expendable due to his contract, the rise of Bam Morris, the signing of former 1,000-yard running back Erric Pegram, injuries, and (more long-term) the forthcoming trade for future Hall of Famer Jerome Bettis the following year. Pittsburgh traded Foster to the expansion Carolina Panthers, but he was cut in training camp when he failed a physical, after which he retired.

Later that season, Foster came out of retirement to sign with the Cincinnati Bengals after the injury to their first-round draft pick Ki-Jana Carter in the preseason. But two days after signing a $1 million contract, Foster changed his mind and left the Bengals. Foster, age 26, out of football since the Carolina Panthers released him before the 1995 season began, complained that he felt like "a 60-year-old running back" after his first workout in pads with the team. He later returned his reported $300,000 signing bonus to the Bengals, left town, and retired again a few days later without playing a game. He announced that he had saved his money and had enough to retire.

== Since Retirement ==
After Foster retired from the NFL, he became the running backs coach at DeLay Middle School, and went on to be an Assistant Principal at Crosswinds Accelerated High School in Grand Prairie, Texas. Currently, he is an assistant Principal at Hillwood Middle School in Fort Worth, TX.

== NFL career statistics ==
Year	Team	GP	Att	Yds	Avg	Lng	TD	Rec	Yds	Avg	Lng	TD
1990	PIT	16	36	203	5.6	38	1	1	2	2.0	2	0
1991	PIT	10	96	488	5.1	56	1	9	117	13.0	31	1
1992	PIT	16	390	1,690	4.3	69	11	36	344	9.6	42	0
1993	PIT	9	177	711	4.0	38	8	27	217	8.0	21	1
1994	PIT	11	216	851	3.9	29	5	20	124	6.2	27	0
Career		62	915	3,943	4.3	69	26	93	804	8.6	42	2

== Family ==
Foster has been married to Teray M. Foster since 1992. Together they have 3 children: Janea Foster, Barry Foster Jr., and Tamara M. Foster. Barry also has an older son named Shayne Foster.
