= Ryan Mallett =

American football player (1988–2023)

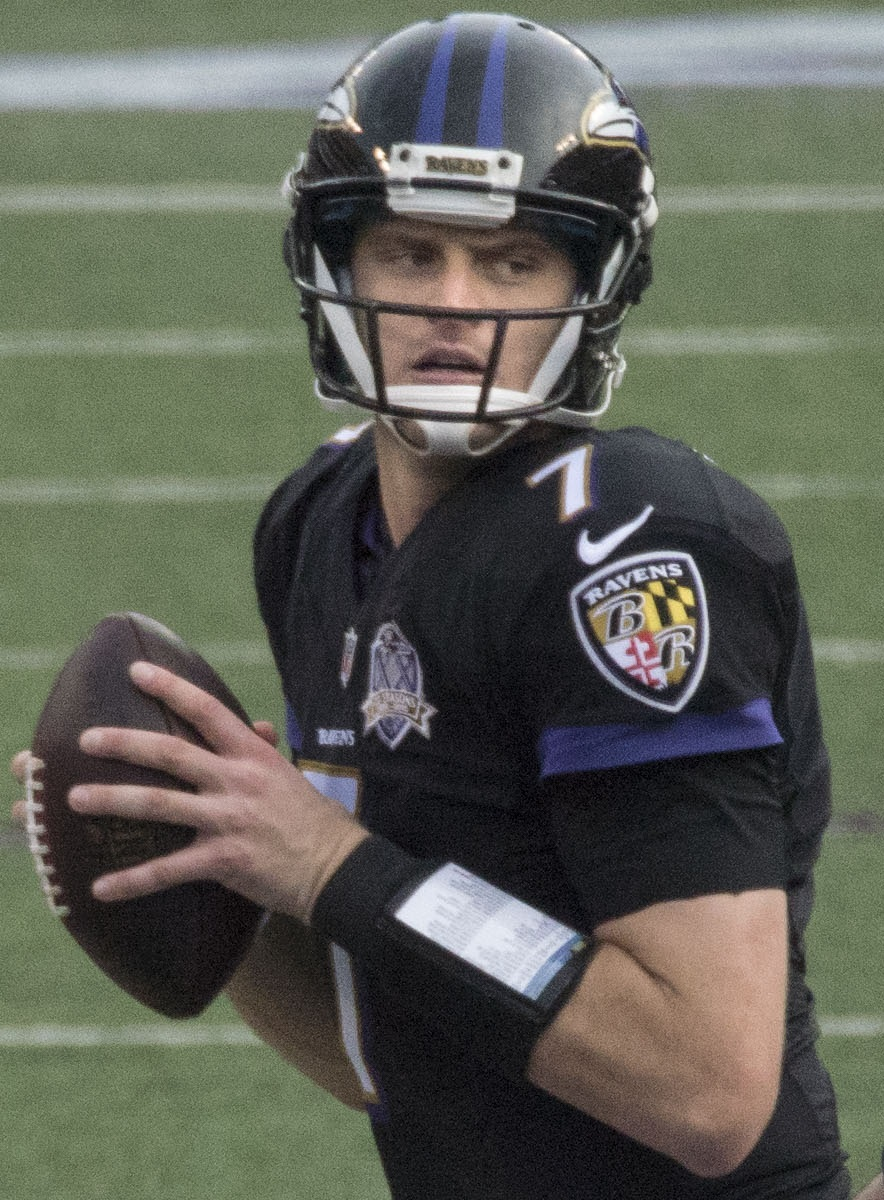
- Mallett with the Baltimore Ravens in 2015

No. 15, 7
- Position: Quarterback

Personal information
- Born: June 5, 1988; Batesville, Arkansas, U.S.
- Died: June 27, 2023 (aged 35); Destin, Florida, U.S.
- Listed height: 6 ft 6 in (1.98 m)
- Listed weight: 250 lb (113 kg)

Career information
- High school: Texas (Texarkana, Texas)
- College: Michigan (2007); Arkansas (2008–2010)
- NFL draft: 2011: 3rd round, 74th overall pick

Career history

Playing
- New England Patriots (2011–2013); Houston Texans (2014–2015); Baltimore Ravens (2015–2017); TSL Generals (2021)

Coaching
- Mountain Home (AR) (2020–2021) Assistant coach; White Hall HS (AR) (2022) Head coach

Awards and highlights
- 2× Second-team All-SEC (2009, 2010)

Career NFL statistics
- Passing attempts: 345
- Passing completions: 190
- Completion percentage: 55.1%
- TD–INT: 9–10
- Passing yards: 1,835
- Passer rating: 66.8
- Stats at Pro Football Reference

Ryan Michael Mallett (June 5, 1988 – June 27, 2023) was an American professional football quarterback who played in the National Football League (NFL) for seven seasons. Following one season with the Michigan Wolverines, he played college football for the Arkansas Razorbacks, receiving two consecutive second-team All-SEC honors between 2009 and 2010. Mallett was selected in the third round of the 2011 NFL draft by the New England Patriots, where he spent his first three seasons, and was a member of the Houston Texans and Baltimore Ravens during his final four.

== Early life ==
Mallett was born in Batesville, Arkansas. His father, Jim, was a high school teacher and football coach and mother, Debbie, was a teacher. He had an older sister, Lauren. He became friends with Will Middlebrooks when they met in a football camp in the seventh grade.

Mallett graduated from Texas High School in Texarkana, and was ranked as the No. 2 quarterback and No. 4 overall player in the nation by Rivals.com. He was also the Gatorade Player of the Year in Texas in 2006. Mallett participated in the U.S. Army All-American Bowl in 2007 and won the Glenn Davis Army Award as the best player on the West team. He chose to play at Michigan over numerous Power 5 offers.

== College career ==
=== Michigan ===
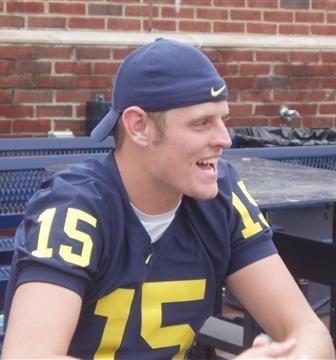
Mallett in 2007

Mallett made his first appearance at Michigan in the second game of the 2007 season against Oregon. He entered the game for the injured Chad Henne in the third quarter and completed 6 of 17 passes for 49 yards and one interception. Mallett started the next week against Notre Dame and led the Wolverines to a 38–0 victory by throwing 3 touchdown passes, going 7 of 15 (46.7%) for 90 yards. Mallett started his first Big Ten conference game against Penn State the following week. He went 16 of 29 (55.2%) with 170 yards and one interception. He also scored on a 10-yard rush in the first quarter. Henne returned to start the Wolverines' next three games. In those games, Mallett had limited playing time completing 4 of 10 for 30 yards.

Mallett's next start was against Minnesota. He threw a touchdown pass and went 11 of 20 (55.0%) with 233 yards and no interceptions. Mallett did not start, but played extensively the next week in a loss against Wisconsin. He threw 3 touchdown passes and went 11 of 36 (30.6%) with 245 yards and two interceptions. In the fourth quarter, Mallett threw a 97-yard touchdown pass to Mario Manningham, the longest pass completion in Michigan history. Mallett played very little in the next week's game against Ohio State. He threw three passes and completed one of them for eight yards. Overall, he finished the 2007 season with 892 passing yards, seven passing touchdowns, and five interceptions.

After Michigan's hiring of head coach Rich Rodriguez, Mallett announced his intent to transfer as Rodriguez's read option offense typically utilizes a dual–threat quarterback rather than a pro–style quarterback like Mallett. On January 14, 2008, he enrolled at the University of Arkansas, where he was ineligible to play during the 2008 season due to NCAA transfer policies.

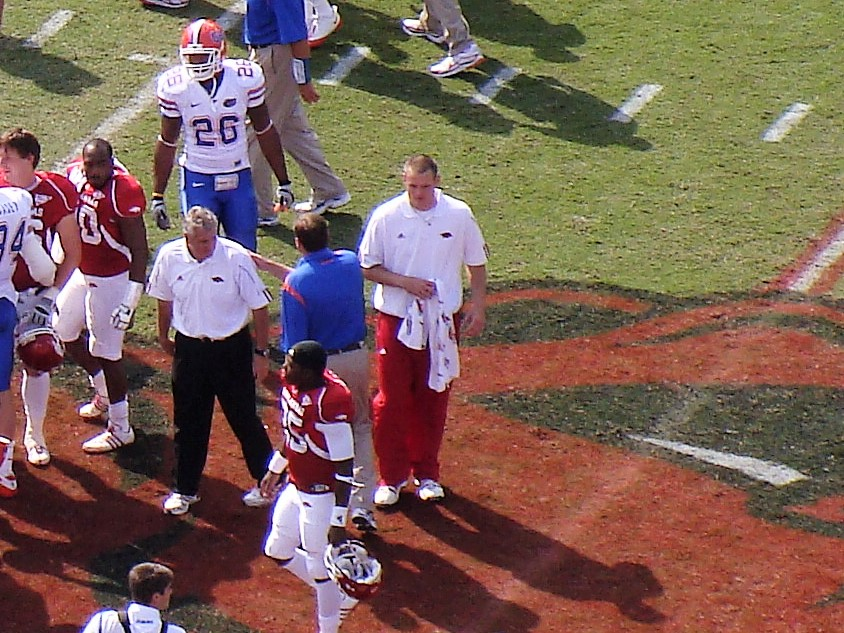
Mallett during a postgame handshake with the Florida Gators during the 2008 season

=== Arkansas ===
==== 2009 ====
In 2009 as a redshirt sophomore, Mallett began his career as an Arkansas Razorback. Prior to the 2009 season, Mallett was named by ESPN's Bruce Feldman as one of college football's top 10 newcomers of the year, citing his arm strength as a major determining factor. In subsequent interviews, when Mallett was questioned about how far he could throw the football, he said farther than 80 yards.

On March 1, 2009, Mallett was arrested on charges of public intoxication. He pleaded guilty to the misdemeanor charge on April 3, 2009, and paid $155 in court costs, fines, and fees. Mallett was also punished by head coach Bobby Petrino with early wake-up calls, extra running, and early curfews.

Mallett earned the starting job in the Razorbacks' first game against Missouri State, going 17-of-22 for 309 yards and a touchdown. Two weeks later, Mallett passed for 408 yards and five touchdowns against Georgia in a losing effort. The passing yardage and touchdowns were single-game school records. Mallett threw for more than 250 yards in three of Arkansas' next five games, with nine touchdowns against three interceptions. Impressive victories over Texas A&M and Auburn were coupled with tough losses to Alabama and Ole Miss, and a loss to Florida. After a 3–4 start, Mallett led Arkansas to three consecutive victories over Eastern Michigan (14-of-16 for 248 yards and three touchdowns), South Carolina (23-of-27 for 329 yards and one rushing touchdown), and Troy (23-of-30 for 405 yards, five touchdowns and one interception). Over those three games, he completed 83.1% of his passes, and had a quarterback rating of 165.05, which was third-best in the nation. The victory over Troy pushed Arkansas' record to 6–4 and secured the Hogs' bowl eligibility, with games against Mississippi State and LSU remaining. Mallett went on to throw for 313 yards and matched his career high of five touchdown passes in a 42–21 victory over Mississippi State. The following week, he threw for 227 yards and a touchdown in a 33–30 overtime loss to LSU in Baton Rouge. The Razorbacks finished the 2009 season with an 8–5 record and won the 2010 Liberty Bowl against East Carolina, 20–17 in overtime. Mallett was named the bowl game's Offensive MVP.

Mallett currently owns sixteen school records, including most passing yards in a season (3,627), most consecutive passes without an interception, most passing yards in a game (408), most passing touchdowns in a game (5, three times), only quarterback to pass for over 400 yards in a game (two times), most pass plays of 25 or more yards in a season, and most passing touchdowns in a single season (30).

Mallett chose to forgo entering the 2010 NFL draft, and returned for his junior season at Arkansas.

==== 2010 ====
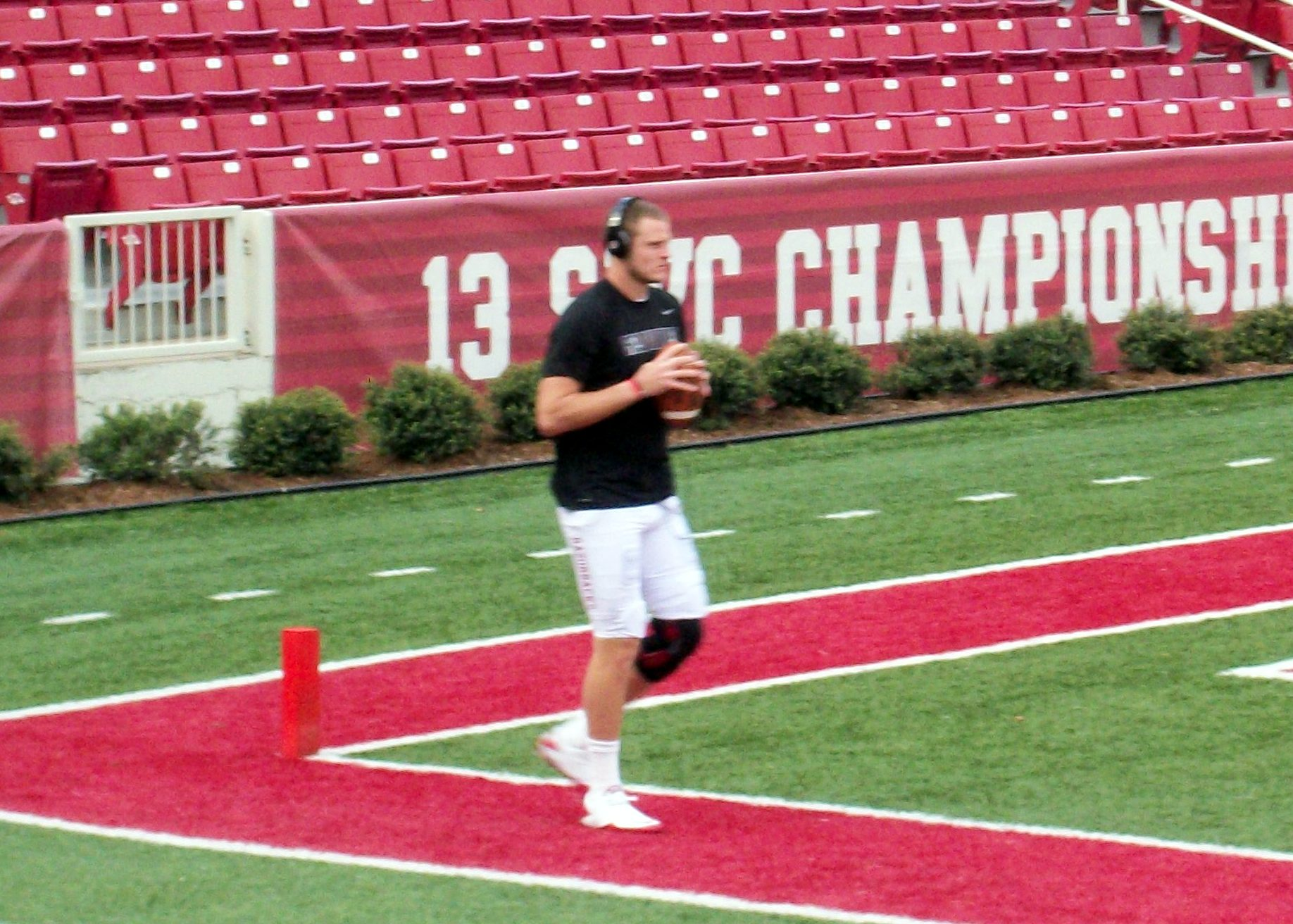
Mallett in 2010

On February 17, 2010, the Razorbacks announced that Mallett suffered a left foot injury in a change of direction conditioning drill. He had successful surgery later that day, and a planned second surgery was announced on June 9. Mallett missed the Razorback spring game and spring drills, but he did not miss fall camp. During the off season, Mallett was named one of college football's most irreplaceable players by ESPN.com, and he appeared on College Football Live. At the SEC's 2010 Media Days conference, Mallett became the first Arkansas quarterback to be named preseason first-team All-SEC by the SEC coaches. He was listed as the frontrunner for the Davey O'Brien Award by The Sporting News and a potential Heisman Trophy candidate. He was also named a preseason All-SEC quarterback and preseason All-American quarterback by numerous organizations.

On September 4, 2010, in a 44–3 victory over Tennessee Tech, Mallett completed 21 of 24 passes (87.5%), setting an Arkansas school record for completion percentage in a game. The completion percentage also ranks second all-time in SEC football history. Mallett contributed 301 passing yards, as well, with a total of 8 receivers recording catches. In the next game against Louisiana–Monroe, he finished with 400 passing yards, three touchdowns, and one interception. In the next game, against Georgia, he had his third consecutive game with three touchdown passes in the conference victory. Arkansas played Alabama in the next game and suffered their first setback of the season as Mallett had 357 passing yards, one touchdown, and three interceptions. The Razorbacks bounced back in the next game against Texas A&M as Mallett had 310 passing yards, three touchdowns, and one interception. After a loss to Auburn and a victory over Ole Miss, Mallett had 409 passing yards and three touchdowns in a victory over Vanderbilt. After a win over South Carolina, he had 215 passing yards and five touchdowns in a win over UTEP. After closing out the season with victories over Mississippi State and LSU, the Razorbacks faced off against Ohio State in the Sugar Bowl. In his final collegiate game, Mallett had 277 passing yards, two touchdowns, and one interception as the Razorbacks fell 31–26.

Mallett finished seventh in voting for the 2010 Heisman Trophy award. On January 6, 2011, Mallett decided to forgo his senior year at Arkansas and declare for the 2011 NFL draft.

== Professional career ==
Pre-draft measurables
Height	Weight	Arm length	Hand span	Wingspan	40-yard dash	10-yard split	20-yard split	Vertical jump	Broad jump
6 ft 6 3/4 in (2.00 m)	253 lb (115 kg)	34 3/8 in (0.87 m)	10 3/4 in (0.27 m)	6 ft 10 in (2.08 m)	5.37 s	1.84 s	3.06 s	26.0 in (0.66 m)	8 ft 7 in (2.62 m)
All values from NFL Combine and Pro Day

Mallett is tied with Chris Redman and Toby Korrodi for the slowest 40-yard dash time for a quarterback in NFL Combine history with a 5.37.

=== New England Patriots ===
==== 2011 season ====
Mallett, who was often projected prior to the draft as a first-round talent, fell to the third round of the 2011 NFL draft, where he was selected 74th overall by the New England Patriots (using the pick they received when they traded Randy Moss to the Minnesota Vikings); that pick was the highest pick the Patriots had used on a quarterback since taking Drew Bledsoe number one overall in 1993, until they drafted Jimmy Garoppolo in the second round of the 2014 NFL draft 62nd overall. According to Michael Lombardi of the NFL Network, the Patriots rated Mallett as the best quarterback available in the 2011 draft; nevertheless, six other quarterbacks were taken before the Patriots drafted him, drawing comparisons to Tom Brady, who was the seventh quarterback chosen in 2000, though with the 199th pick.

Mallett made his preseason debut in the Patriots' first preseason game, a 47–12 rout of the Jacksonville Jaguars on August 11. He played the entire second half, completing 12 of 19 passes for 164 yards, one touchdown, and no interceptions. The Patriots scored touchdowns on each of the first four drives Mallett led, and ran out the clock on his fifth and final drive. Mallett struggled in his next preseason games throwing an interception which was returned for a touchdown in his second game. At his fourth preseason game against the Giants he was 6 of 16 for 57 yards. Mallett spent 2011 as the Patriots' third-string quarterback, behind Tom Brady and Brian Hoyer. Mallett was inactive for 15 out of 16 regular season games and was inactive for every post season game for the Patriots' Super Bowl run.

==== 2012 season ====
Following the Patriots' decision to release Hoyer prior to the season, Mallett was promoted to second-string quarterback behind Tom Brady. Mallett dressed in each of the first eight games of the season, and in their blowout 45–7 win over the St. Louis Rams in London on October 28, 2012, Mallett took his first snaps in the NFL, completing 1 of 3 passes for 17 yards (his one completion to Shane Vereen) and a passer rating of 53.5. In the Patriots' blowout victory against the Houston Texans in December 2012, Mallett came into the game late in the fourth quarter and threw his first interception in the NFL on a pass deflected by intended receiver Visanthe Shiancoe.

==== 2013 season ====
Mallett was listed as the No. 2 quarterback on the Patriots' depth chart behind Tom Brady and ahead of third-string quarterback Tim Tebow; Tebow was later released by the Patriots, leaving Mallett as the Patriots' only backup quarterback.

=== Houston Texans ===
==== 2014 season ====
On August 31, 2014, the Patriots traded Mallett to the Houston Texans for a conditional sixth-round pick after losing the backup job to rookie Jimmy Garoppolo. He was the Texans' primary backup until November 5, when he was named the starting quarterback for the Texans by head coach Bill O'Brien, replacing Ryan Fitzpatrick, who was moved down one slot to No. 2 on the depth chart.

During Week 11 of the 2014 season, Mallett started his first game, against the Cleveland Browns where he threw his first touchdown pass, to J. J. Watt. He went 20 of 30 with two passing touchdowns and a 95.3 passer rating in the 23–7 win over the Browns. On November 23, Mallett tore his pectoral muscle against the Cincinnati Bengals, ending his season.

==== 2015 season ====
Mallett returned in 2015, competing for the starting quarterback position against former teammate Brian Hoyer. He lost the competition to Hoyer. The day after the announcement, Mallett missed the following day's practice, leading some to believe he disagreed with the decision. Mallett apologized and told head coach Bill O'Brien that he missed practice due to oversleeping.

Mallett replaced Hoyer in the fourth quarter against the Kansas City Chiefs in Week 1. Head coach Bill O'Brien announced afterward that Mallett would replace Hoyer as the starting quarterback. In Week 2, he completed 27 of his 58 passes for 244 yards, one touchdown and one interception, as well as a rushing touchdown, in a 24–17 loss to the Carolina Panthers.

In Week 4 against the Atlanta Falcons, Mallett was benched with the Texans trailing 42–0 in favor of Hoyer, who then led the team to 21 points in a 48–21 loss. Despite Hoyer's success in the game, Mallett was named the starter for Week 5 against the Indianapolis Colts. During the Colts game, Mallett was hit hard, forcing him to leave for a play. Mallett appeared able and willing to return but was replaced by Hoyer for the remainder of the game. Hoyer threw for two touchdowns but also threw a costly interception to give the Colts a 27–20 victory. Before the Texans' game against the Dolphins on October 25, Mallett missed the team flight and was forced to fly commercial to join the team in Miami. Two days later, the Texans released him.

=== Baltimore Ravens ===
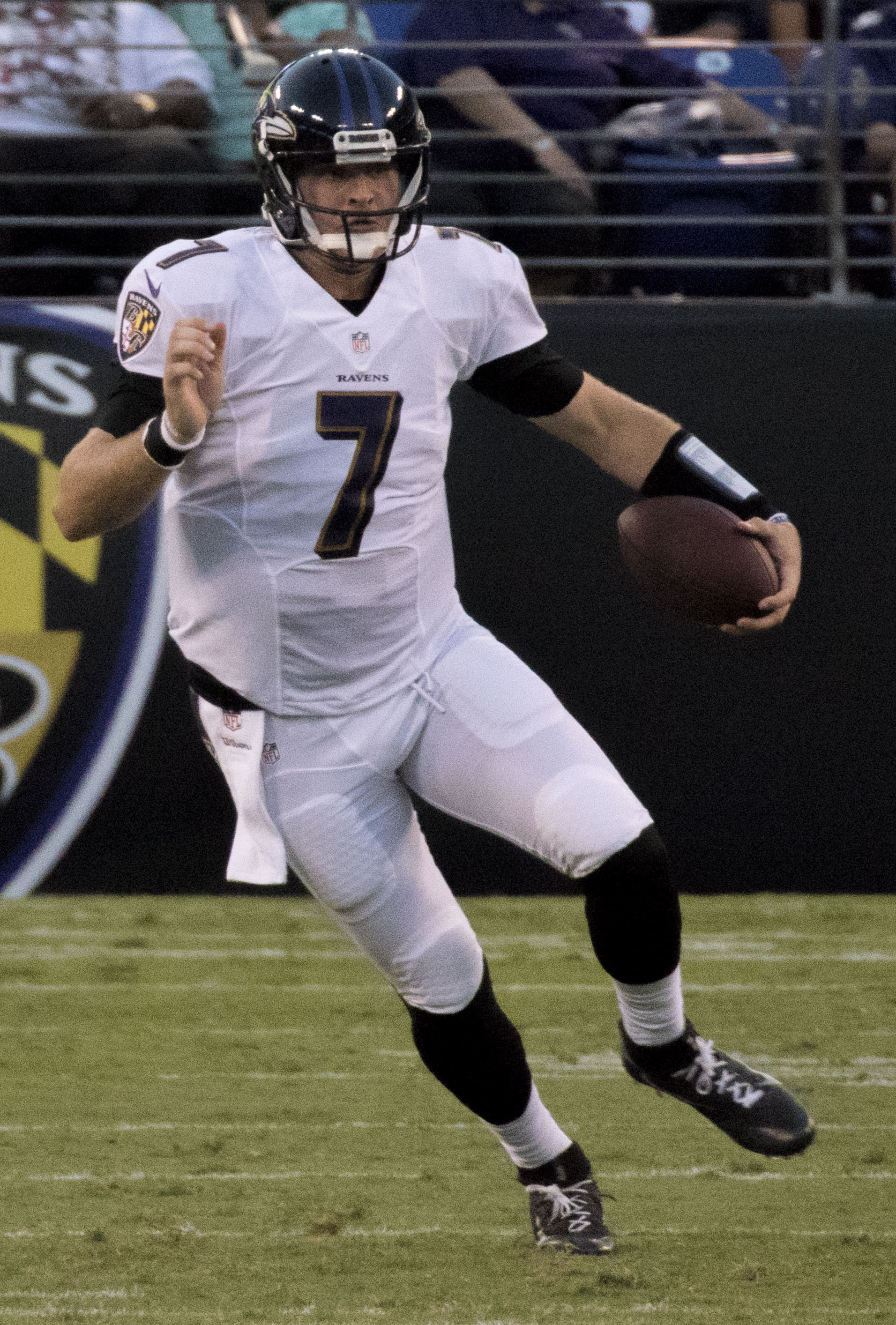
Mallett in 2016

On December 15, 2015, in the wake of Baltimore Ravens quarterback Matt Schaub suffering an injury following Joe Flacco's own season-ending injury, Mallett signed with the Ravens. On December 27, 2015, Mallett threw for a career-high 274 yards, leading the Ravens to a 20–17 upset victory over the Pittsburgh Steelers in his seventh career start, after Jimmy Clausen was benched. He would promptly get a new career high the following week with 292 passing yards in the Ravens' 24–16 loss to the Cincinnati Bengals.

Following Schaub returning to the Atlanta Falcons to be Matt Ryan's backup and Clausen retiring from the NFL, Mallett became Flacco's primary backup in 2016, appearing in four games. He completed three of his six passes and also threw an interception.

On March 9, 2017, Mallett signed a one-year contract extension with the Ravens. After Flacco suffered a concussion late in the second quarter of the Week 8 game against the Miami Dolphins, Mallet entered the game and completed three of seven passes for 20 yards and one touchdown as the Ravens won by a score of 40–0.

=== After the NFL ===
In 2019 Mallett attended the XFL Tampa Bay Summer Showcase, but was not drafted to the league.

In 2021 he played for The Spring League Generals. In his first game Mallett completed 20 of 31 passes for 252 yards in a 21–19 victory over the Jousters. In week 6 he was selected as the South Division Player of the Week.

== Career statistics ==
=== NFL ===
Year	Team	Games		Passing								Rushing				Sacks		Fumbles	
Year	Team	GP	GS	Comp	Att	Pct	Yds	Avg	TD	Int	Rate	Att	Yds	Avg	TD	Sck	SckY	Fum	Lost
2012	NE	4	0	1	4	25.0	17	4.3	0	1	5.2	8	−9	−1.1	0	0	0	0	0
2013	NE	Did not play																	
2014	HOU	3	2	41	75	54.7	400	5.3	2	2	67.6	6	−2	−0.3	0	1	5	0	0
2015	HOU	6	4	78	147	53.1	770	5.2	3	4	63.6	4	11	2.8	1	4	13	0	0
2015	BAL	2	2	58	97	59.8	566	5.8	2	2	74.5	1	4	4.0	0	2	19	0	0
2016	BAL	4	0	3	6	50.0	26	4.3	0	1	22.2	5	−6	−1.2	0	0	0	0	0
2017	BAL	2	0	9	16	56.3	56	3.5	2	0	103.1	2	4	2.0	0	0	0	1	0
Career		21	8	190	345	55.1	1,835	5.3	9	10	66.8	26	2	0.1	1	7	37	1	0

=== College ===
Season	Team	Games		Passing									
Season	Team	GP	GS	Comp	Att	Pct	Yds	Avg	Lng	TD	Int	Y/G	Rtg
2007	Michigan	11	3	61	141	43.3	892	14.6	97	7	5	81.1	105.7
2008	Arkansas	Ineligible due to NCAA transfer rule											
2009	Arkansas	13	13	225	403	55.8	3,624	16.3	83	30	7	278.8	152.5
2010	Arkansas	13	13	266	411	64.7	3,869	14.5	89	32	12	297.6	163.6
Career		37	29	552	955	57.8	8,385	15.1	97	69	24	226.6	150.4

=== High school ===
Season	ATT	COMP	COMP%	YDS	TD	INT
2004 (So.)	316	152	47.8	2,307	18	10
2005 (Jr.)	221	133	60.2	2,219	21	6
2006 (Sr.)	321	204	63.6	3,353	33	3
Totals	858	488	56.9	7,879	72	19

== Awards and honors ==
- 2010 Premier Player of College Football Trophy Winner
- 2009 and 2010 All-SEC second team
- Autozone Liberty Bowl Offensive MVP
- SEC Offensive Player of the Week (vs. South Carolina, Mississippi State, and Vanderbilt)

== Personal life and coaching career ==
After a car accident, Mallett was arrested for suspicion of driving while intoxicated in Arkansas on September 10, 2019.

On April 16, 2020, Mallett was announced as an assistant coach at Mountain Home High School in Mountain Home, Arkansas. In 2022, he became the head football coach at White Hall High School in White Hall, Arkansas.

On January 24, 2024, Mallett's wife had his first and only son, Razor Ryan Mallett, seven months after his death.

== Death ==
Mallett drowned in Destin, Florida, on June 27, 2023, at the age of 35. According to the Okaloosa County Sheriff's Office, Mallett was swimming with his girlfriend and was unable to make it to the safety of a sandbar and drowned. The National Weather Service warned of rip currents around beaches in the Destin area, which were under yellow flag conditions at the time of the tragedy. The Destin Fire Control District clarified that there were no rip currents present in the area during the response to Mallett. The NFL issued a statement on Twitter following news of his death, saying that "The NFL family is deeply saddened by the passing of Ryan Mallett. Our thoughts are with his family and loved ones."
