= Donald Harris (baseball) =

American baseball player (born 1967)

- Outfielder
- Born: November 12, 1967 (age 58); Waco, Texas, U.S.
- Batted: Right Threw: Right

MLB debut
- September 4, 1991, for the Texas Rangers

Last MLB appearance
- October 2, 1993, for the Texas Rangers

MLB statistics
- Batting average: .205
- Home runs: 2
- Runs batted in: 11
- Stats at Baseball Reference

Teams
- Texas Rangers (1991–1993)

Donald Harris (born November 12, 1967) is an American former Major League Baseball player. He attended Texas Tech University.

== Career ==
Harris was a first round draft pick (5th overall) by the Texas Rangers in the 1989 MLB draft. He played in the major leagues from 1991 to 1993 for the Rangers, primarily as an outfielder. In his 82 games, he had a .205 batting average, and 24 hits. He participates in the community by attending and participating in various camps and appearances, where he serves as a motivational speaker and mentor to youth.
