= Wayne Martin (American football) =

American football player (born 1965)

No. 93
- Positions: Defensive end, defensive tackle

Personal information
- Born: October 26, 1965 (age 61); Forrest City, Arkansas, U.S.
- Listed height: 6 ft 5 in (1.96 m)
- Listed weight: 275 lb (125 kg)

Career information
- High school: Cross County (Cherry Valley, Arkansas)
- College: Arkansas
- NFL draft: 1989: 1st round, 19th overall pick

Career history
- New Orleans Saints (1989–1999)

Awards and highlights
- Second-team All-Pro (1992); Pro Bowl (1994); New Orleans Saints Hall of Fame; Consensus All-American (1988); SWC Defensive Player of the Year (1988); First-team All-SWC (1988)

Career NFL statistics
- Tackles: 597
- Sacks: 82.5
- Forced fumbles: 12
- Stats at Pro Football Reference

Gerald Wayne Martin (born October 26, 1965) is an American former professional football player who was a defensive end for eleven seasons with the New Orleans Saints of the National Football League (NFL) from 1989 to 1999. He played college football for the Arkansas Razorbacks.

== Early life ==
In high school at Cross County High, Martin led his team to an undefeated record as a Senior.

== College career ==
He attended the University of Arkansas and finished his career with 37 TFL and 25.5 sacks. His TFL (Tackles For Loss) rank 3rd and his sacks rank 1st in school history. Martin was a first-team All-Southwest Conference selection in 1988, as well as an All-American, anchoring the Razorbacks defense that helped win the 1988 SWC championship, finishing 10-2 on the season.

== Professional career ==
He was selected by the Saints in the first round of the 1989 NFL draft. Very athletic with great length and solid strength at the point of attack, Martin proved to be a fixture on the Saints defensive front. An ironman, Martin only missed 1 game in 11 seasons. He started 144 straight games.

Martin amassed a total of 82.5 quarterback sacks, which currently stands as the 3rd most career sacks with the Saints behind current star Defensive End Cameron Jordan and linebacker teammate Rickey Jackson. Martin was inducted into the "New Orleans Saints Hall of Fame" in 2003 with Jim Dombrowski.

Martin wore uniform number 93.

Martin, known as being quiet and reserved, missed the Pro Bowl after the 1992 season having racked up 15.5 sacks. Martin led the NFC in sacks in 1995. Martin earned $22.8 million during his 11 seasons with the Saints.

Martin was able to produce four consecutive 10+ sack seasons. He reached that milestone during the 1994-1997 seasons, respectively. After another uncharacteristic subpar 1999-2000 season totaling under 7 sacks consecutive seasons (1998-1999), (1999-2000), he was asked to take a pay cut by a new Saints staff headed by coach Jim Haslett. Martin retired shortly thereafter.

== Personal life ==
Martin's son, Wayne Martin Jr. won the 2011 Florida High School Coaches Association 2A player of the year as a senior at Providence School of Jacksonville. Wayne Jr. went on to accept a full basketball scholarship to UCF, where he played for one season before transferring to Southeast Missouri State University in 2012. He was dismissed from the team for violating team rules in 2013.

Martin's younger brother, Jeff Martin, was drafted by the Los Angeles Clippers in the second round of the 1989 NBA Draft. Two months prior, the elder Martin was selected in the 1989 NFL Draft.
