= Dudley (given name) =

- Pronunciation: /ˈdʌdli/ DUD-lee
- Gender: Masculine
- Language: English

Origin
- Language: Old English
- Origin: From a surname that was originally from a place name.
- Derivation: Old English: Duddan + Leah
- Meaning: "Dudda's clearing"
- Region of origin: England

Other names
- Short form: Dud

Dudley is a male given name that means "Dudda's clearing".

== People ==
- Dudley Benjafield (1887–1957), British doctor and racing driver
- Dudley Bradley (born 1957), American basketball player
- Dudley Bradstreet (1711–1763), Irish adventurer and secret agent
- Dudley Bradstreet (magistrate) (1648–1702), American magistrate
- Dudley B. Bridgforth Jr. (born 1940), American politician
- Dudley Buck (1839–1909), American composer
- Dudley Carleton (disambiguation), several people
- Dudley Chase (1771–1846), American senator from Vermont
- Dudley Clarke (1899–1974), British army officer
- Dudley Connell (born 1956), American bluegrass singer
- Dudley de Chair (1864–1958), Canadian naval officer and governor of New South Wales
- Dudley DeGroot (1899–1970), American footballer and coach
- Dudley de Silva (1911–1974), Sri Lankan Sinhala educationist
- Dudley Digges (c. 1583–1639), English diplomat and politician
- Dudley Digges (actor) (1879–1947), Irish stage and film actor
- Dudley Doolittle (1881–1957), American politician
- Dudley Evans (cricketer) (1886–1972), English cricketer
- Dubhaltach Mac Fhirbhisigh (fl. 1643–1671), Irish scribe, translator, historian and genealogist also known as Dudly Ferbisie
- J. Dudley Goodlette (born 1948), American politician and lawyer
- Dudley Gordon, 3rd Marquess of Aberdeen and Temair 1883–1972), British peer, soldier and industrialist
- Dudley Hart (born 1968), American professional golfer
- Dudley R. Herschbach (born 1932), American chemist, winner of the 1986 Nobel Prize in Chemistry
- Dudley Hooper (1911–1968), British accountant and early promoter of electronic data processing
- Dudley Mays Hughes (1848–1927), American politician from Georgia
- Darach Ó Catháin (1922-1987), Irish sean-nós singer, also known as Dudley Kane
- Dudley Knowles, Scottish political philosopher and professor
- Dudley Wright Knox (1877-1960), US naval officer and historian
- Dudley J. LeBlanc, American politician and Louisiana state senator
- Dudley Le Souef (1856–1923), Australian ornithologist
- Dudley Moore (1935–2002), English actor and comedian
- Dudley Murphy (1897–1968), American film director
- Dudley Nichols (1895–1960), American screenwriter
- Dudley Nourse (1910–1981), South African cricketer
- Dudley Perkins (disambiguation), several people
- Dudley Pope (1925–1997), British writer of nautical fiction and history
- Dudley Pope (cricketer) (1906–1934), English cricketer
- Dudley Pound (1877–1943), British Admiral of the Fleet and First Sea Lord
- Dudley Richards (1932–1961), American figure skater
- Dudley Rippon (1892–1963), English cricketer
- Dudley Roberts (born 1945), English footballer
- Dudley Ryder (disambiguation)
- Dudley Senanayake (1911–1973), 2nd, 6th and 8th Prime Minister of Ceylon
- Dudley Spade (born 1956), American politician
- Dudley Stamp (1898–1966), British geographer
- Dudley Storey (1939–2017), New Zealand Olympic rower
- Dudley Tyler (born 1944), English footballer
- Dudley Wanaguru (1924–2002), Sri Lankan Sinhala cinema actor
- Dudley D. Watkins (1907–1969), English cartoonist and creator of Oor Wullie

== Fictional characters ==
- Dudley, an angel in the film The Bishop's Wife played by Cary Grant
- Dudley, a British boxer from the Street Fighter video game series
- Dudley Bristol, protagonist of the television series Dudley, played by Dudley Moore
- Dudley "Booger" Dawson, in the Revenge of the Nerds franchise
- Dudley Dursley, in the Harry Potter books and films
- Dudley Mafee, in the television series Billions
- Dudley Do Nothing, in Shorty McShorts' Shorts
- Dudley Do-Right, an animated Canadian Mountie
- Dudley Liam Smith, an L.A. Confidential villain
- Dudley Puppy, one of the main protagonists of Nickelodeon's T.U.F.F. Puppy
- Dudley Ramsey, in the television series Diff'rent Strokes

== See also ==
- Dudley (disambiguation)
- Dudley (surname)
