= Dudley (surname) =

Dudley is an English toponymic surname associated with the town of Dudley in West Midlands, England. Notable people with the surname include:

- Allen Dudley, American politician
- Ambrose Dudley, 3rd Earl of Warwick (c. 1530 – 1590), English general and patron of moderate Puritanism
- Andrew Dudley (c. 1507 – 1559), English soldier and courtier
- Angela Dudley, South African laser scientist
- Anne Dudley (born 1956), English composer and pop musician
- Anne Dudley, maiden name of American poet Anne Bradstreet (c. 1612 – 1672)
- Becca Dudley (born 1990), English presenter and DJ
- Benjamin Winslow Dudley (1785–1870), American surgeon and academic in Kentucky.
- Bill Dudley (1921–2010), American football player
- Billy Dudley (1931–1980), Nigerian political scientist
- Bob Dudley (born 1955), chief executive officer of BP
- Carl Dudley (1910–1973), American film director and producer
- Charles Benjamin Dudley (1842–1909), American chemist
- Chris Dudley (born 1965), American basketball player
- Dave Dudley (1928–2003), American country singer
- Doc Dudley (1894–1975), Negro league baseball player
- Doris Dudley (1917–1965), American actress
- Dudd Dudley (1600–1684), pioneer English metallurgist
- Ed Dudley (1901–1963), American golfer
- Edmund Dudley (c. 1462 or 1471/1472–1510), English politician in the Tudor period
- Edward Bishop Dudley (1789–1855), American politician, 28th governor of North Carolina
- Elizabeth Henry Haywood Dudley (1796–1840), American political hostess
- Ernest Dudley (1908–2006), British writer
- George Dudley (1894–1960), Canadian ice hockey administrator and Hockey Hall of Fame inductee
- Lord Guildford Dudley (c. 1535 – 1554), husband of Lady Jane Grey
- Helena Dudley (1858–1932) American social worker, labor organizer, and pacifist
- Henry Sutton Dudley (1517–1568), English soldier, sailor, diplomat, and conspirator
- Homer Dudley (1896–1987), American inventor of the vocoder.
- James Dudley (1910–2004), American baseball player and professional wrestling manager and executive
- James B. Dudley (1859–1925), president of North Carolina Agricultural and Technical State University
- Jane Dudley (1912–2001), American dancer, choreographer and teacher
- Jane Dudley, Duchess of Northumberland (1508/1509–1555), wife of John Dudley, 1st Duke of Northumberland
- Janet Dudley-Eshbach, President of Salisbury University, Maryland
- Jared Dudley (born 1985), American basketball player
- Jimmy Dudley (1909–1999), American sportscaster
- John Dudley, 1st Duke of Northumberland (1504–1553), English general, supported claims of Lady Jane Grey
- John Dudley, 2nd Earl of Warwick (c. 1527–1554), son of the 1st Duke of Northumberland
- Joseph Dudley (1647–1720), a colonial governor of Massachusetts, son of Thomas Dudley
- Katherine Hastings, Countess of Huntingdon (died 1620), daughter of the 1st Duke of Northumberland
- Margaret Johnson Erwin Dudley (1821–1863), American plantation owner
- Marion Dudley (1972–2006), American murderer
- Mary Dudley, Lady Sidney (c. 1530–1586), English lady-in-waiting, mother of Sir Philip Sydney
- Sir Matthew Dudley (1661–1721), English politician
- Nathan Dudley (1825–1910), acting brigadier general for the Union Army in the American Civil War
- Owen Francis Dudley (1882–1952) English novelist and priest
- Paul Dudley (jurist) (1675–1751), Attorney General of Massachusetts, son of Joseph Dudley
- Paul Dudley (American football) (1939–1987)
- Peter Dudley (1935–1983), English character actor
- Richard M. Dudley (1938–2020), mathematics professor at the Massachusetts Institute of Technology
- Rick Dudley (born 1949), Canadian ice hockey player and coach
- Robert Charles Dudley (1826–1900), British painter.
- Robert Dudley, 1st Earl of Leicester (1532–1588), favourite and suitor of Queen Elizabeth I
- Robert Dudley (explorer) (1574–1649), English explorer and cartographer
- Robert Dudley Edwards (1909–1988), historian
- Roger Dudley (between 1535 and 1545–1586?/1590), English soldier
- Sherman H. Dudley (1872–1940), American vaudeville performer and producer, theater owner
- Terence Dudley (1919–1988), British television director and producer
- Theodore Robert Dudley (1936–1994), American botanist
- Thomas Dudley (1576–1653), colonial magistrate and governor of the Massachusetts Bay Colony
- Underwood Dudley (born 1937), American mathematician
- Uriah Dudley (1852–1909), mine manager in Australia
- William Dudley (colonel) (1766–1813), Kentucky militia officer in the War of 1812
- William Dudley (bishop) (died 1483), Bishop of Durham
- William Dudley (1947–2025), British theatre designer
- William C. Dudley (born 1952), economist at the New York Federal Reserve
- William Edward Dudley (1868–1938), administrator in the British co-operative movement
- William S. Dudley (born 1936), U.S. naval historian
- William Wade Dudley (1842–1909), American soldier, lawyer and politician
- Members of The Dudley Brothers, a professional wrestling stable (all American, with real names next to their lifespans):
  - Big Dick Dudley (1968–2002; Alex Rizzo)
  - Bubba Ray Dudley (born 1971; Mark LoMonaco)
  - Chubby Dudley (born 1970; Bay Ragni)
  - D-Von Dudley (born 1972; Devon Hughes)
  - Dances with Dudley (born c. 1970; Adolfo Bermudez)
  - Dudley Dudley (wrestler) (born 1968; Jeff Bradley)
  - Sign Guy Dudley (born 1970; Lou D'Angeli), wrestling manager and later a marketing executive outside of wrestling
  - Snot Dudley (born 1970; Michael Deek)
  - Spike Dudley (born 1970; Matthew Hyson)

== See also ==
- Dudley (disambiguation)
