= List of Arkansas Razorbacks in the NFL draft =

The National Football League (NFL) have drafted 279 players who had played for the University of Arkansas Razorbacks since the league began holding drafts in 1936. (Note: Because of the NFL–AFL merger agreement, the history of the AFL is officially recognized by the NFL and therefore this list includes the AFL draft (1960–1966) and the common draft (1967–1969).) The Razorbacks' highest draft position was second overall in 1954, when Lamar McHan was selected by the Chicago Cardinals. Arkansas' first drafted player in the NFL was Jack Robbins, who was the fifth overall pick by the Chicago Cardinals in 1938.

Each NFL franchise seeks to add new players through the annual NFL draft. The team with the worst record the previous year picks first, the next-worst team second, and so on. Teams that did not make the playoffs are ordered by their regular-season record, with any remaining ties broken by strength of schedule. Playoff participants are sequenced after non-playoff teams, based on their round of elimination (wild card, division, conference, and Super Bowl).

Before the AFL–NFL merger agreements in 1966, the American Football League (AFL) operated in direct competition with the NFL and held a separate draft. This led to a massive bidding war over top prospects between the two leagues. As part of the merger agreement on June 8, 1966, the two leagues would hold a multiple round common draft. Once the AFL officially merged with the NFL in 1970, the common draft simply became the NFL draft.

== Key ==
QB	QuarterBack (Note: In American and Canadian football, a back is a player who is lined up behind the linemen, the players who line up closest to the line of scrimmage.)	K	Kicker	NT	Nose tackle
C	Center	LB	Linebacker	FB	Fullback
DB	Defensive back	P	Punter	HB	Halfback
DE	Defensive end	QB	Quarterback	WR	Wide receiver
DT	Defensive tackle	RB	Running back	G	Guard
E	End	T	Offensive tackle	TE	Tight end

^{*}	Selected to an all-star game (AFL All-Star game, NFL All-Star game or Pro Bowl)
^{†}	Won a league championship (AFL championship, NFL championship, or Super Bowl)
^{‡}	Selected to an all-star game and won a league championship

== Drafts ==
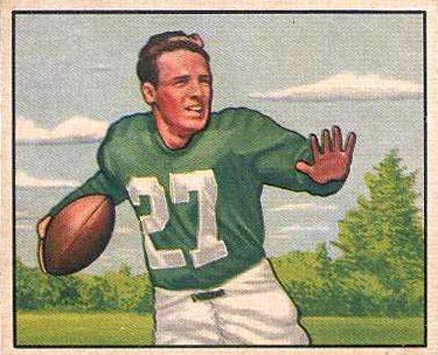
Clyde Scott was drafted 8th overall by the Philadelphia Eagles in the 1948 NFL draft

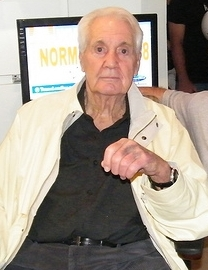
Pat Summerall was drafted 45th overall by the Detroit Lions in the 1952 NFL draft

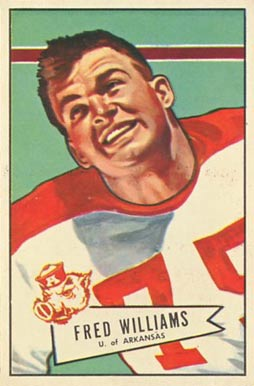
Fred Williams was drafted 56th overall by the Chicago Bears in the 1952 NFL draft

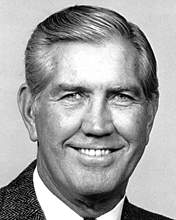
Lew Carpenter was drafted 97th overall by the Detroit Lions in the 1953 NFL draft

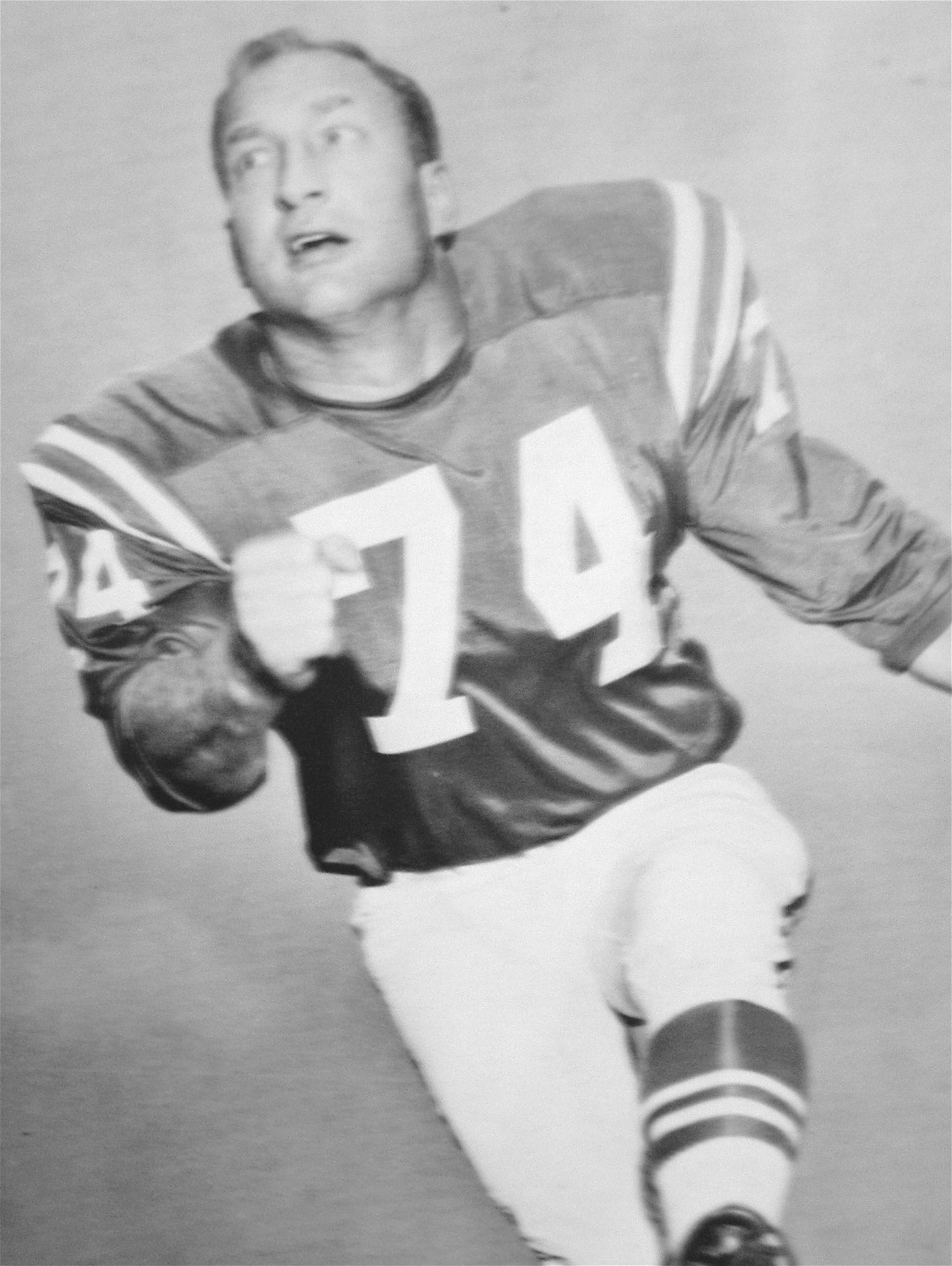
Billy Ray Smith Sr. was drafted 26th overall by the Los Angeles Rams in the 1957 NFL draft

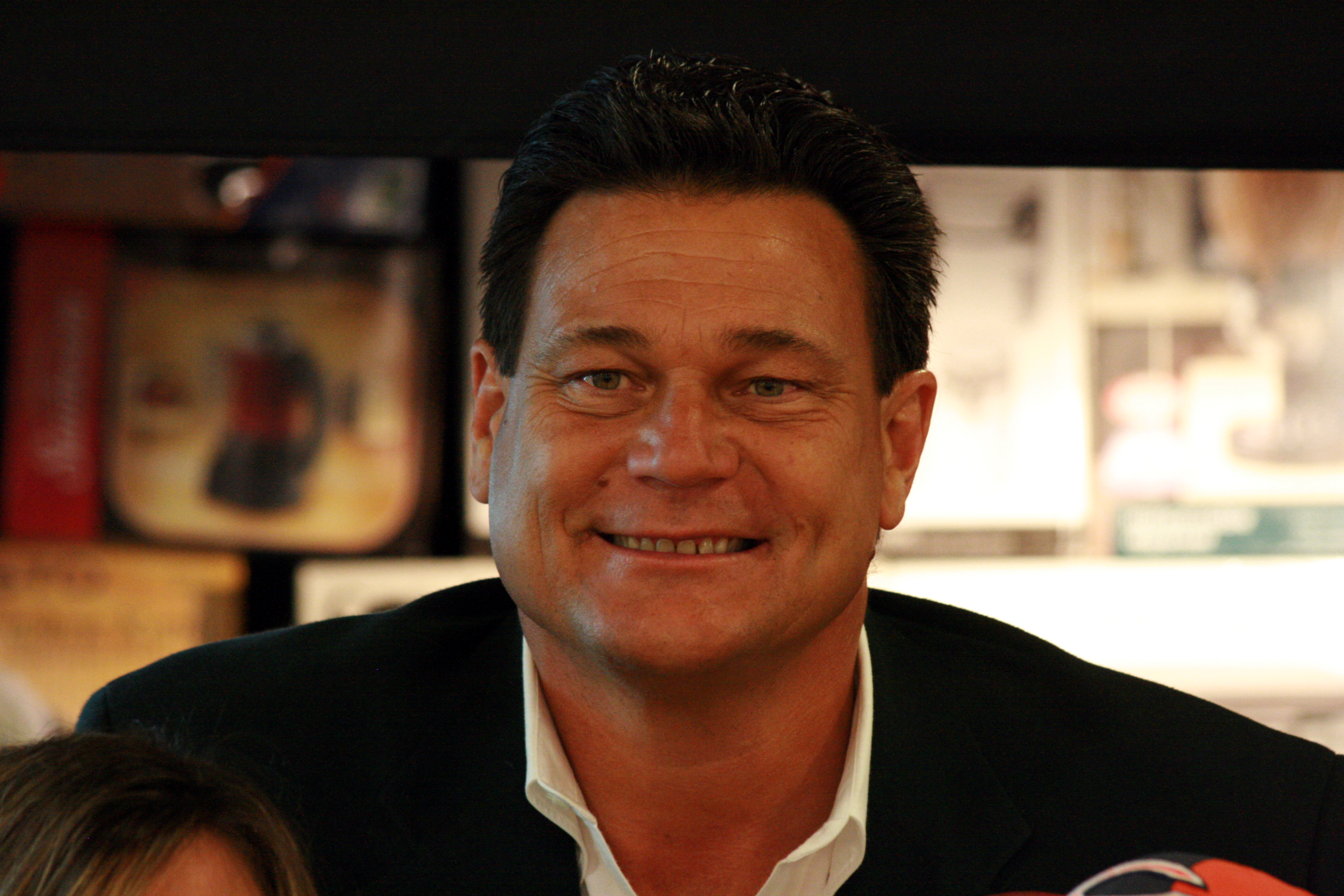
Dan Hampton was drafted 4th overall by the Chicago Bears in the 1979 NFL draft

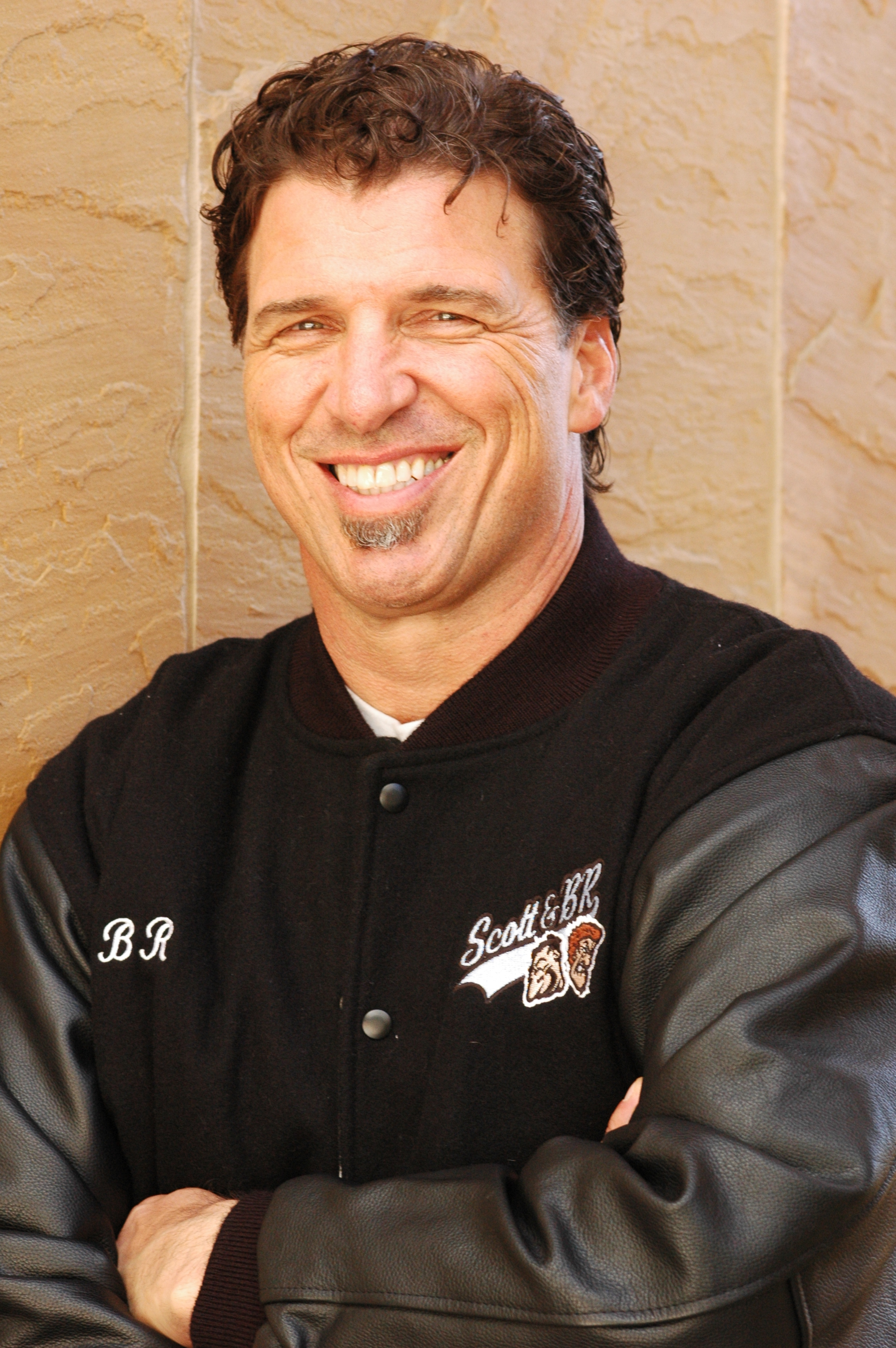
Billy Ray Smith, Jr. was drafted 5th overall by the San Diego Chargers in the 1983 NFL draft

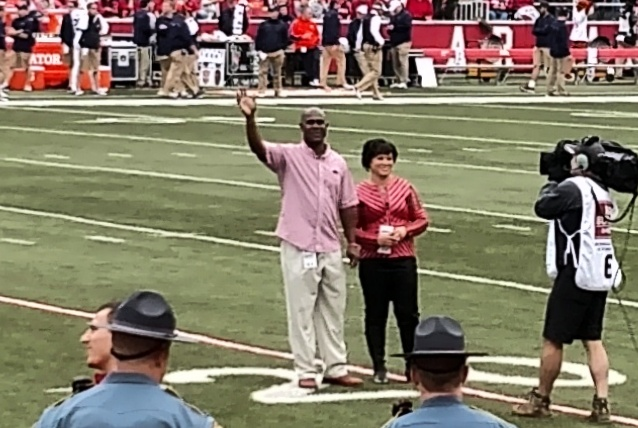
Madre Hill was drafted in 1999

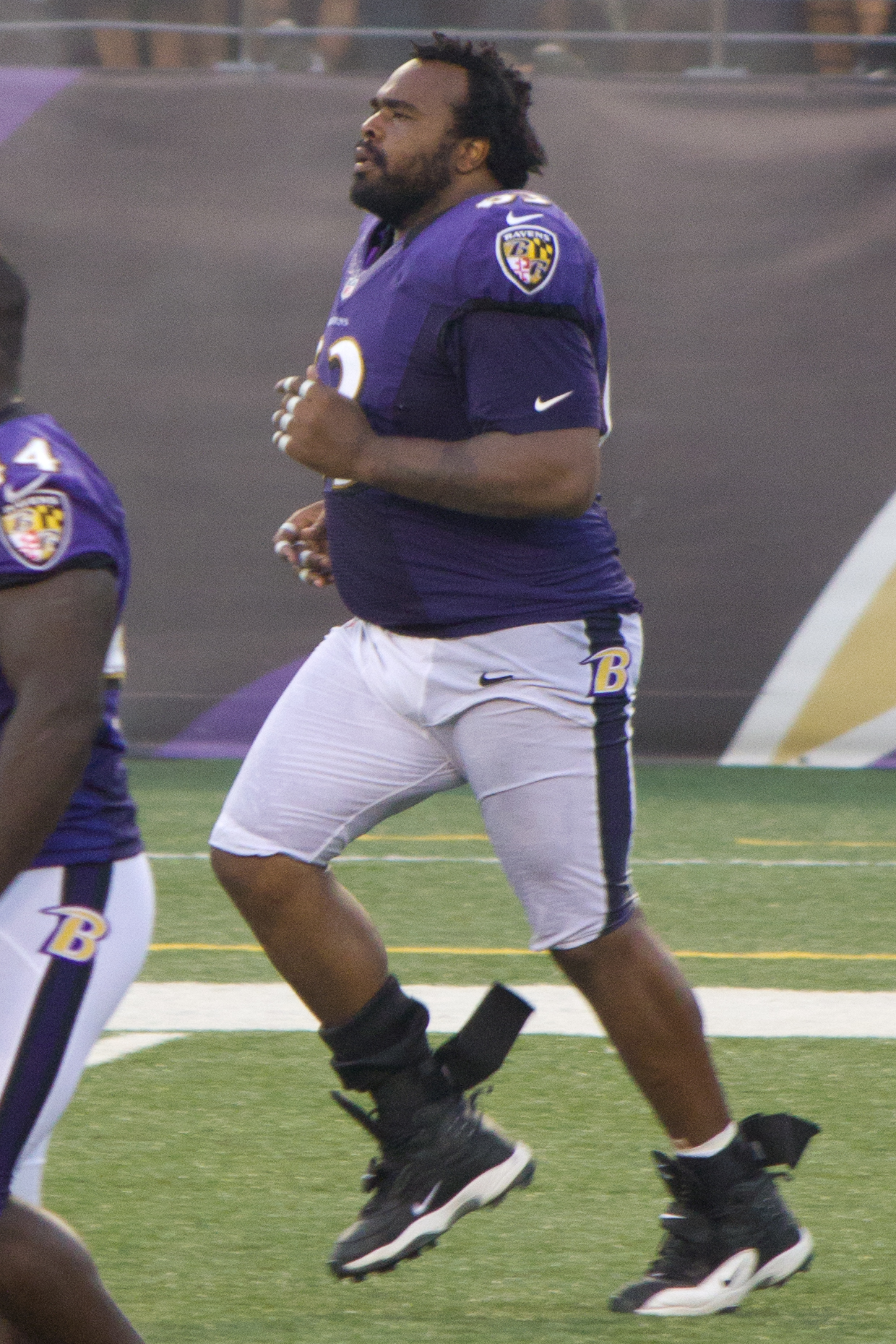
Bobbie Williams was drafted 61st overall by the Philadelphia Eagles in the 2000 NFL draft

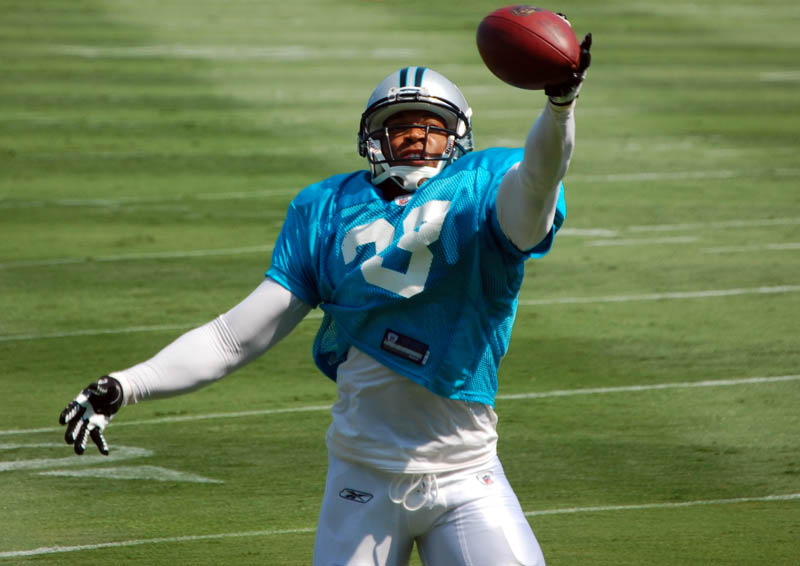
Dante Wesley, who later transferred to the University of Arkansas at Pine Bluff, was drafted 100th overall by the Carolina Panthers in the 2002 NFL draft

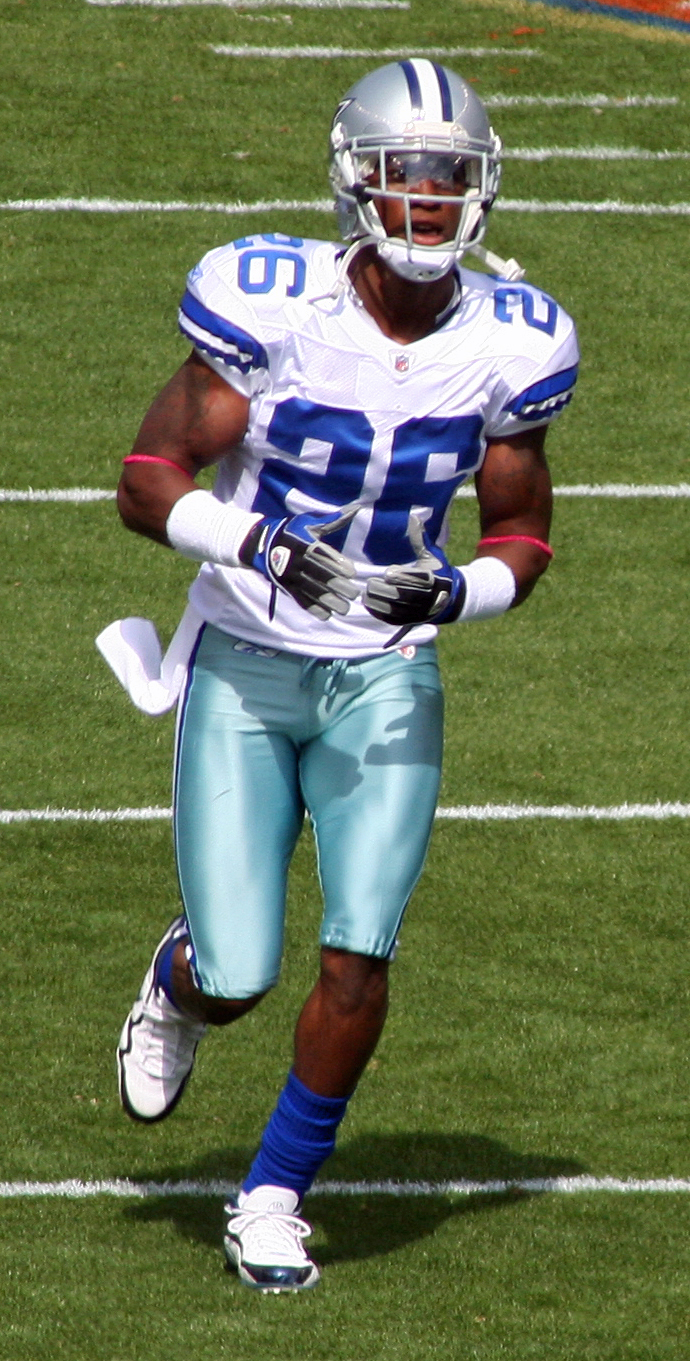
Ken Hamlin was drafted 42nd overall by the Seattle Seahawks in the 2003 NFL draft

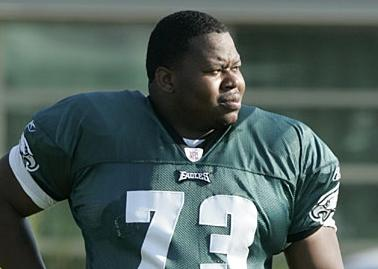
Shawn Andrews was drafted 16th overall by the Philadelphia Eagles in the 2004 NFL draft

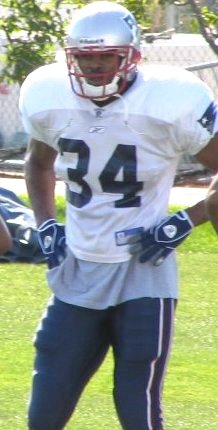
Cedric Cobbs was drafted 128th overall by the New England Patriots in the 2004 NFL draft

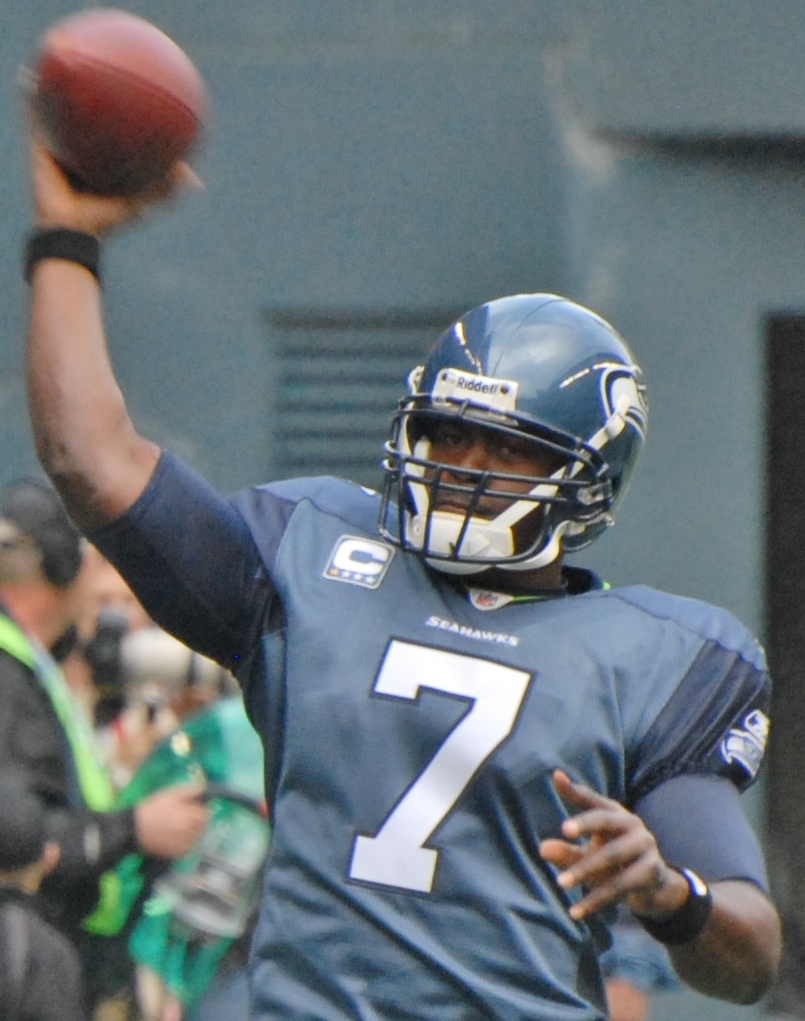
Tarvaris Jackson, who later transferred to Alabama State University, was drafted 64th overall by the Minnesota Vikings in the 2006 NFL draft

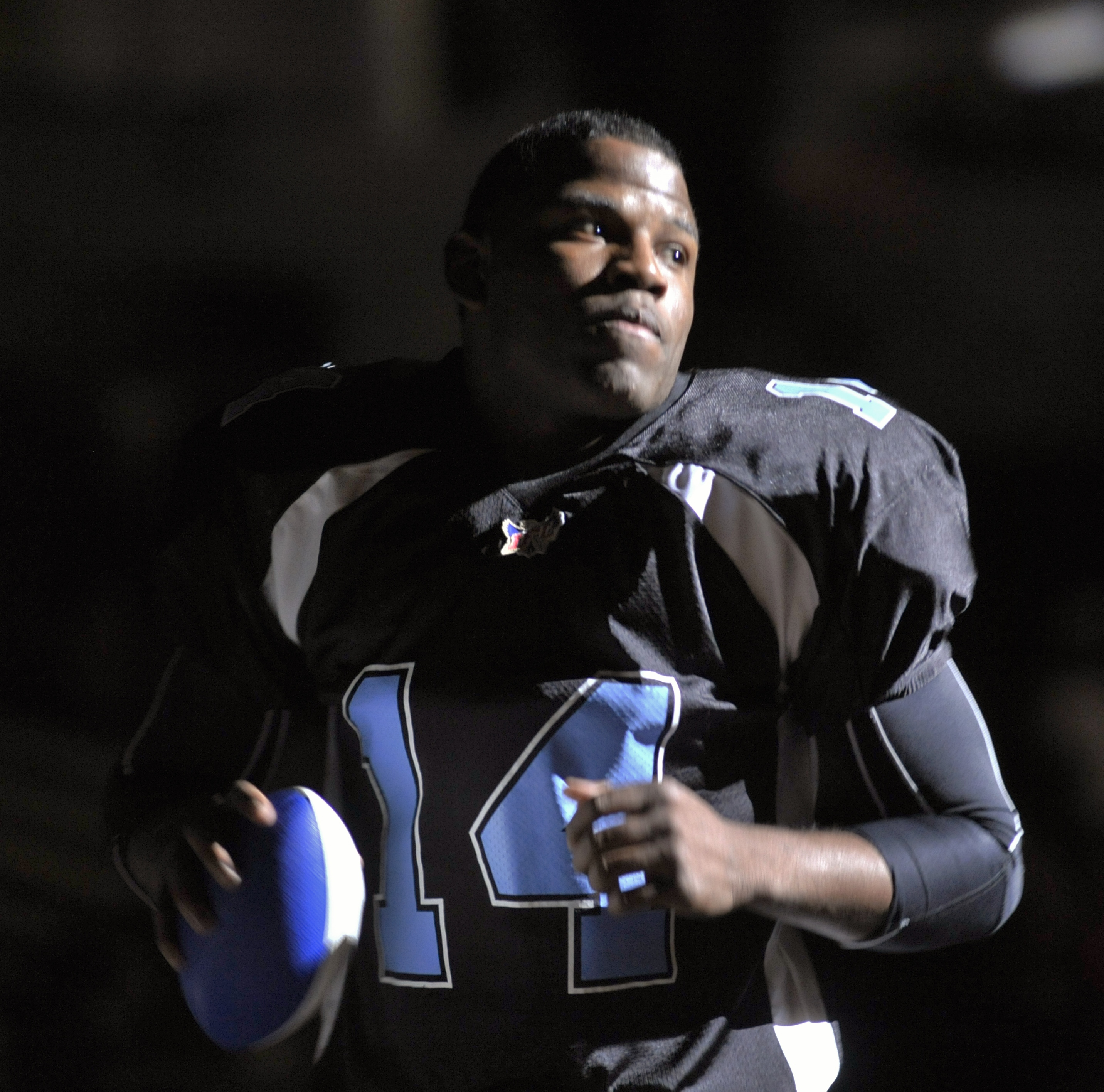
Vickiel Vaughn was drafted 254th overall by the San Francisco 49ers in the 2006 NFL draft

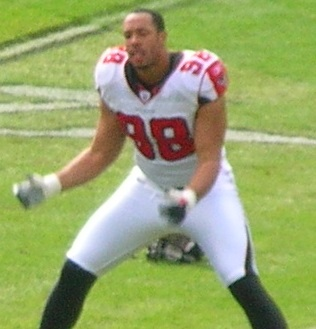
Jamaal Anderson was drafted 8th overall by the Atlanta Falcons in the 2007 NFL draft

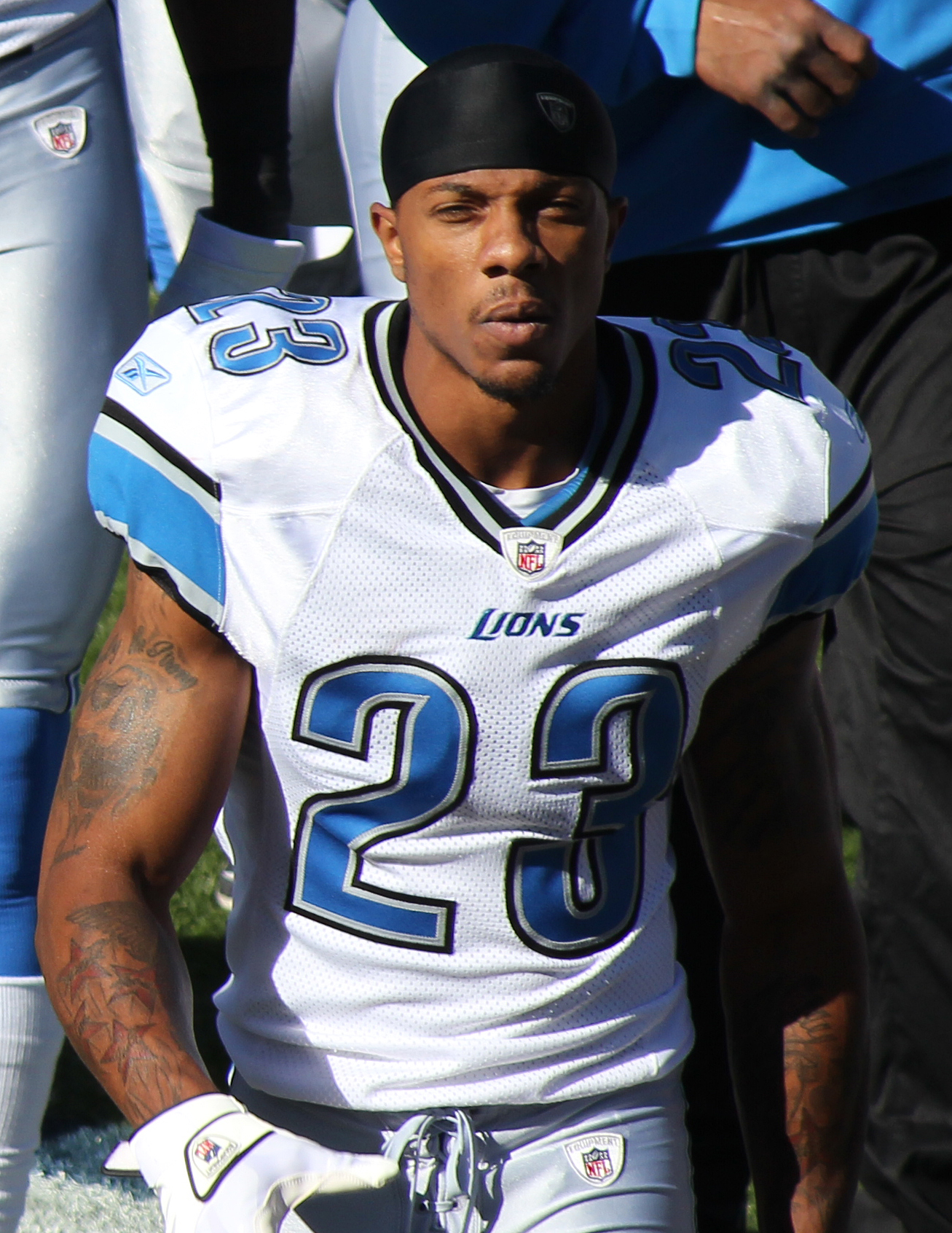
Chris Houston was drafted 41st overall by the Atlanta Falcons in the 2007 NFL draft

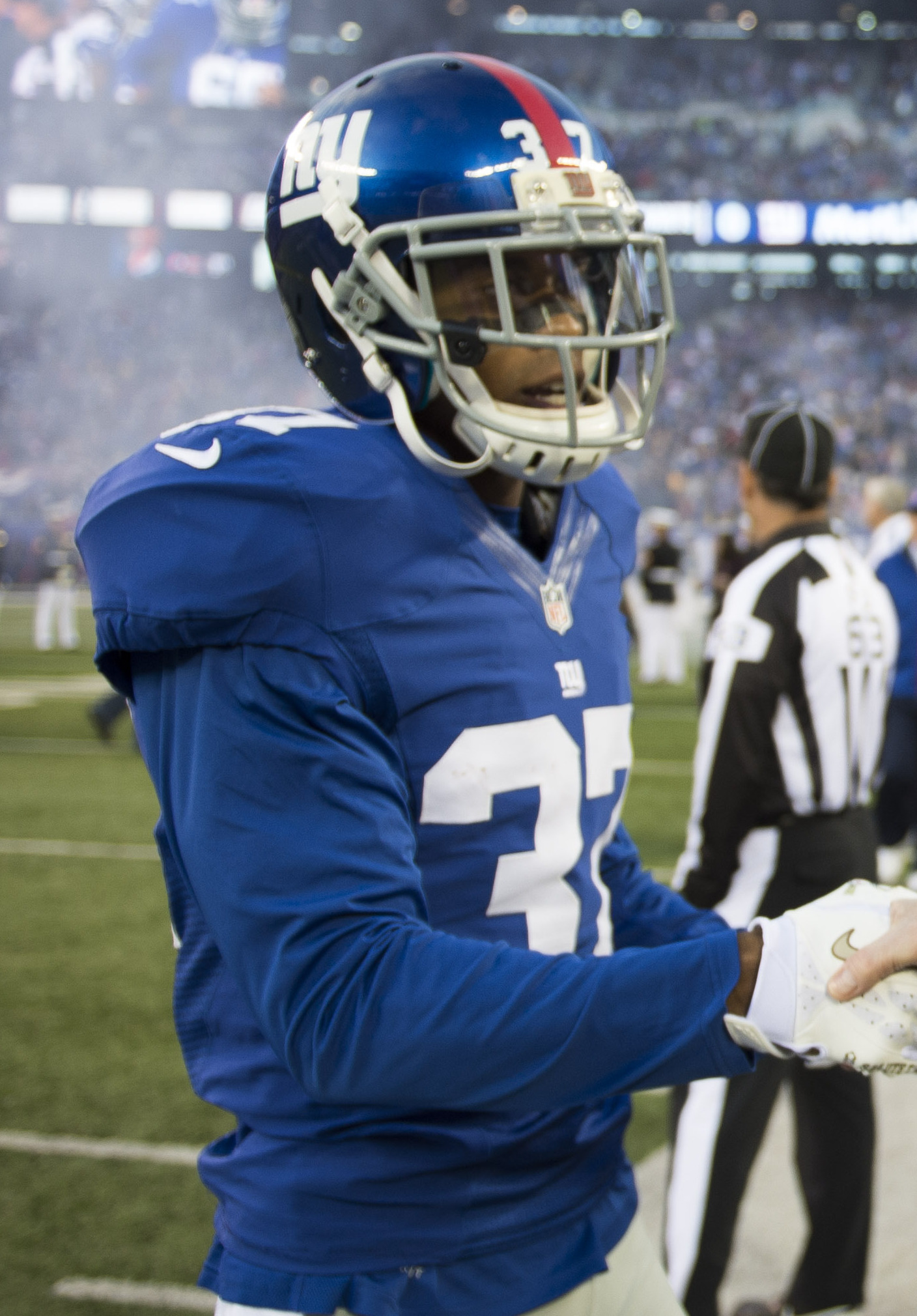
Michael Coe, who later transferred to Alabama State University, was drafted 173rd overall by the Indianapolis Colts in the 2007 NFL draft

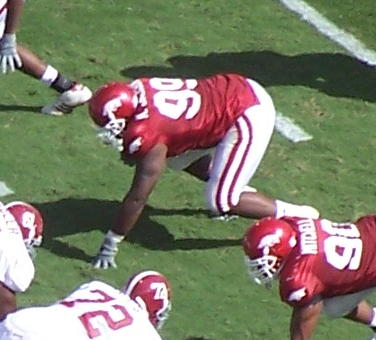
Keith Jackson Jr. (in #99 jersey) was drafted 248th overall by the St. Louis Rams in the 2007 NFL draft

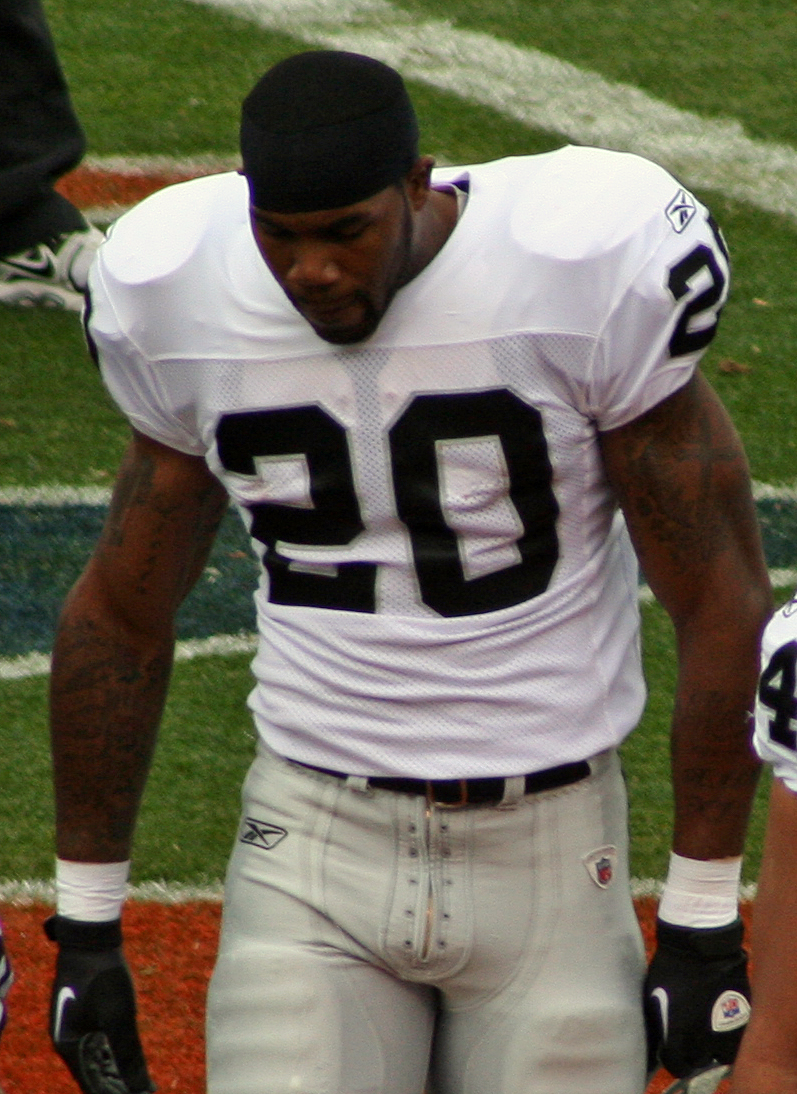
Darren McFadden was drafted 4th overall by the Oakland Raiders in the 2008 NFL draft

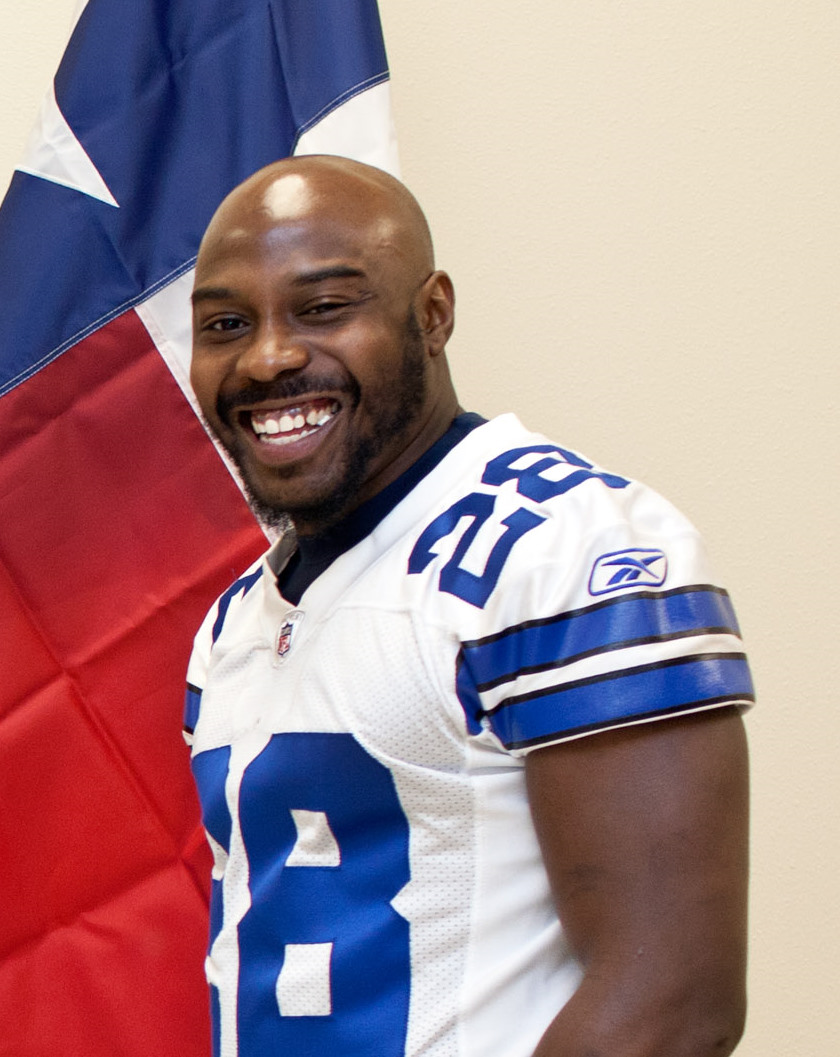
Felix Jones was drafted 22nd overall by the Dallas Cowboys in the 2008 NFL draft

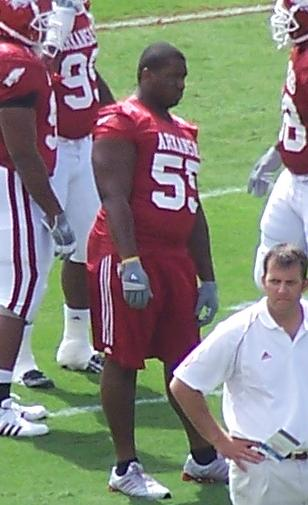
Marcus Harrison was drafted 90th overall by the Chicago Bears in the 2008 NFL draft

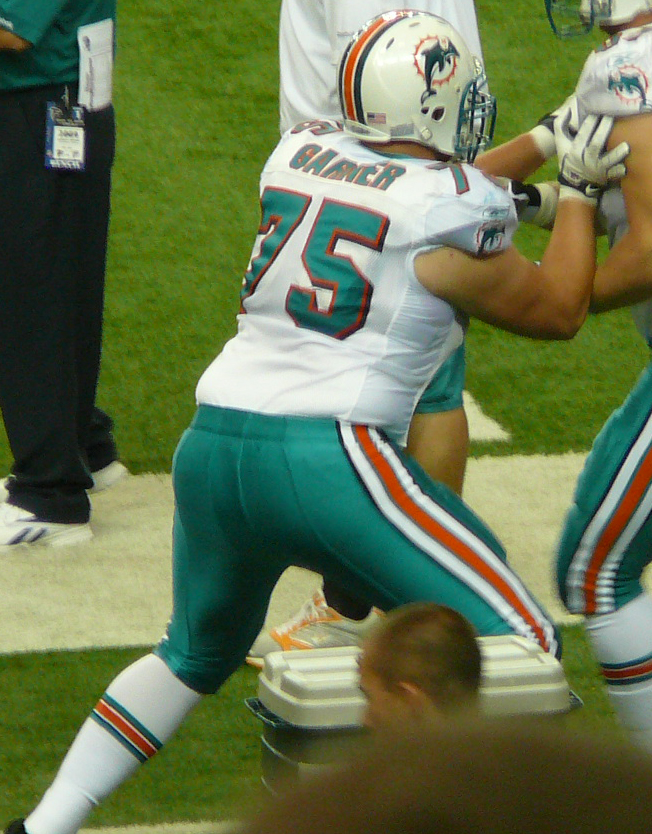
Nate Garner was drafted 211th overall by the New York Jets in the 2008 NFL draft

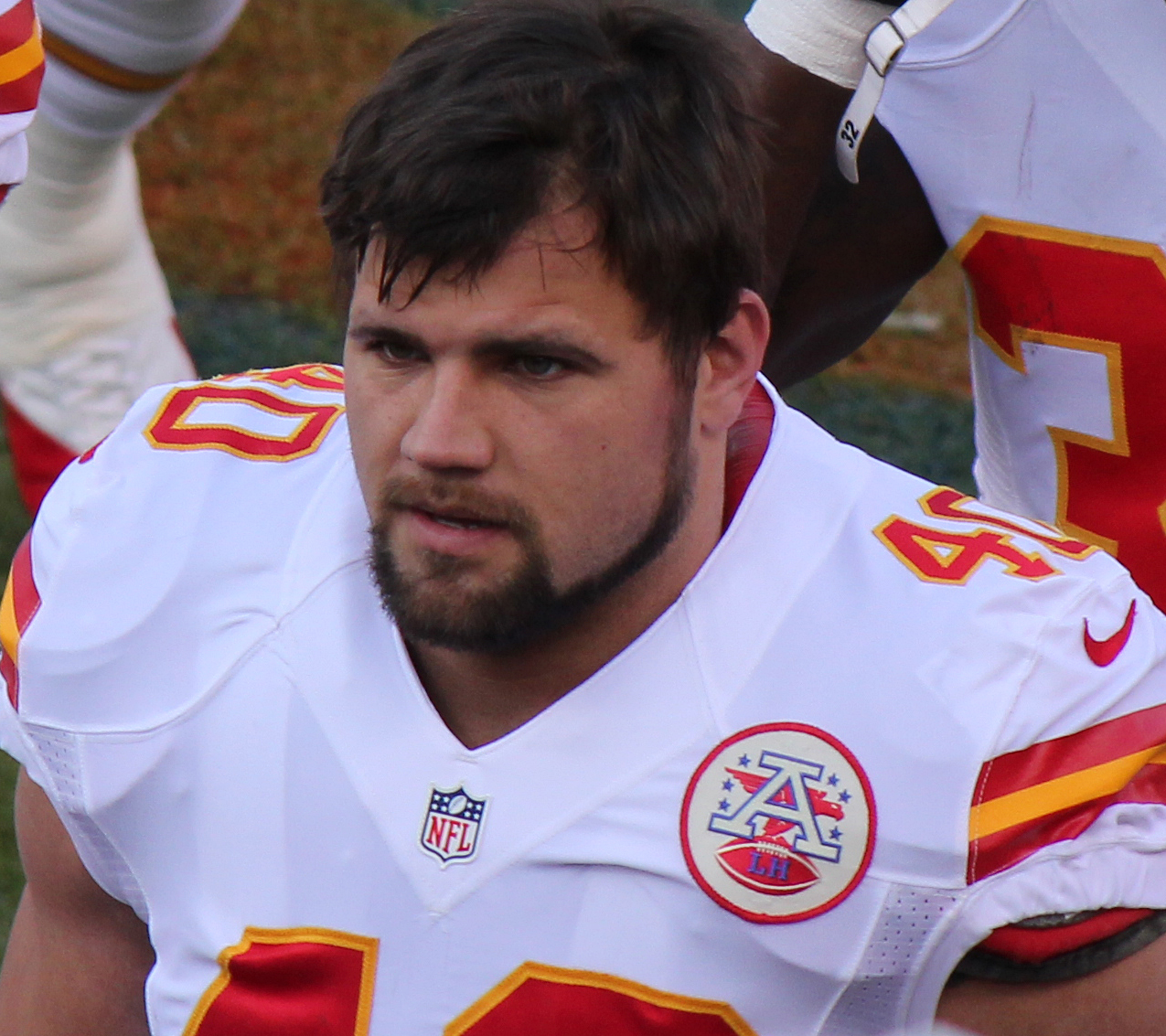
Peyton Hillis was drafted 227th overall by the Denver Broncos in the 2008 NFL draft

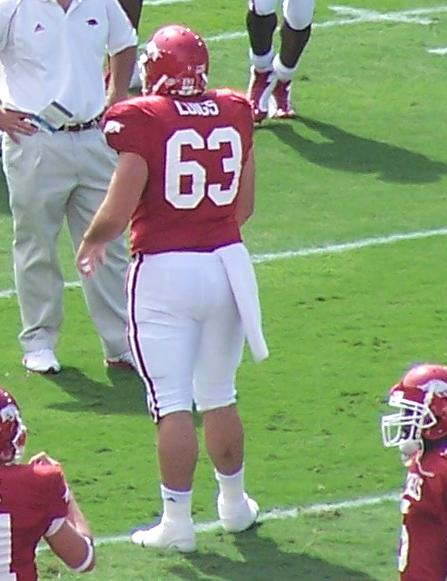
Jonathan Luigs was drafted 106th overall by the Cincinnati Bengals in the 2009 NFL draft

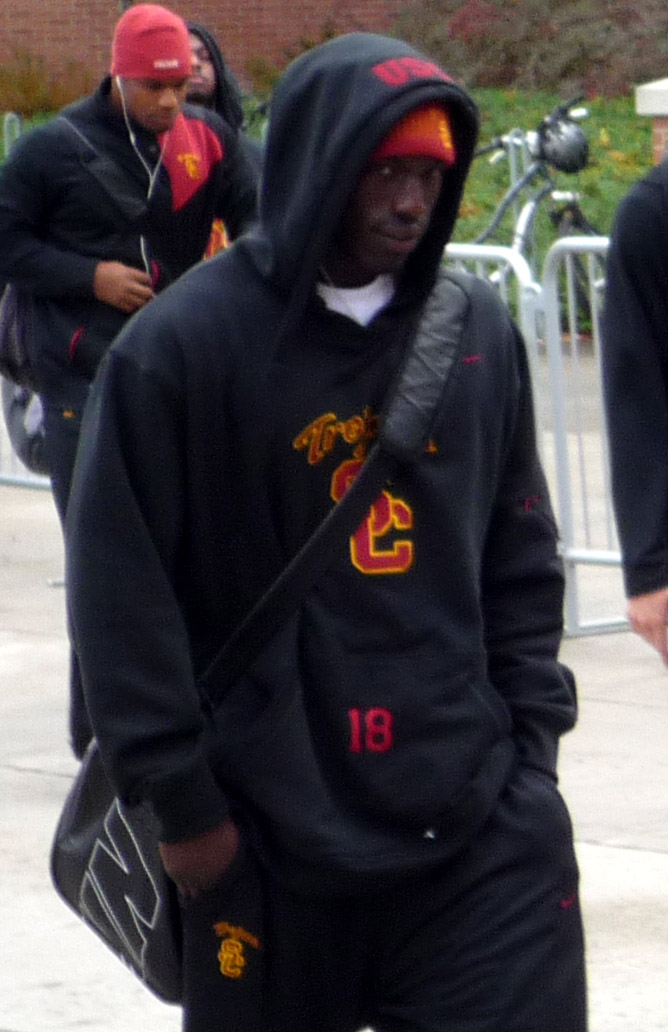
Damian Williams, who later transferred to the University of Southern California, was drafted 77th overall by the Tennessee Titans in the 2010 NFL draft

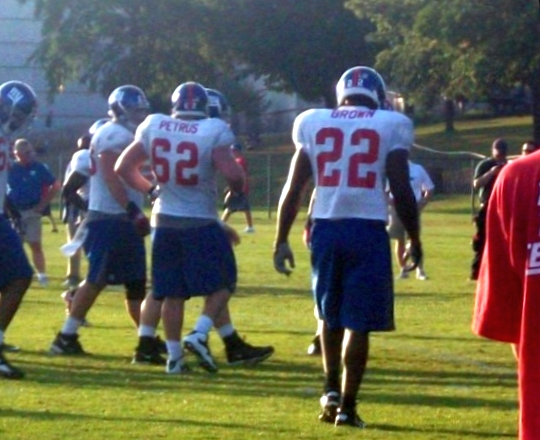
Mitch Petrus (in #62 jersey) was drafted 147th overall by the New York Giants in the 2010 NFL draft

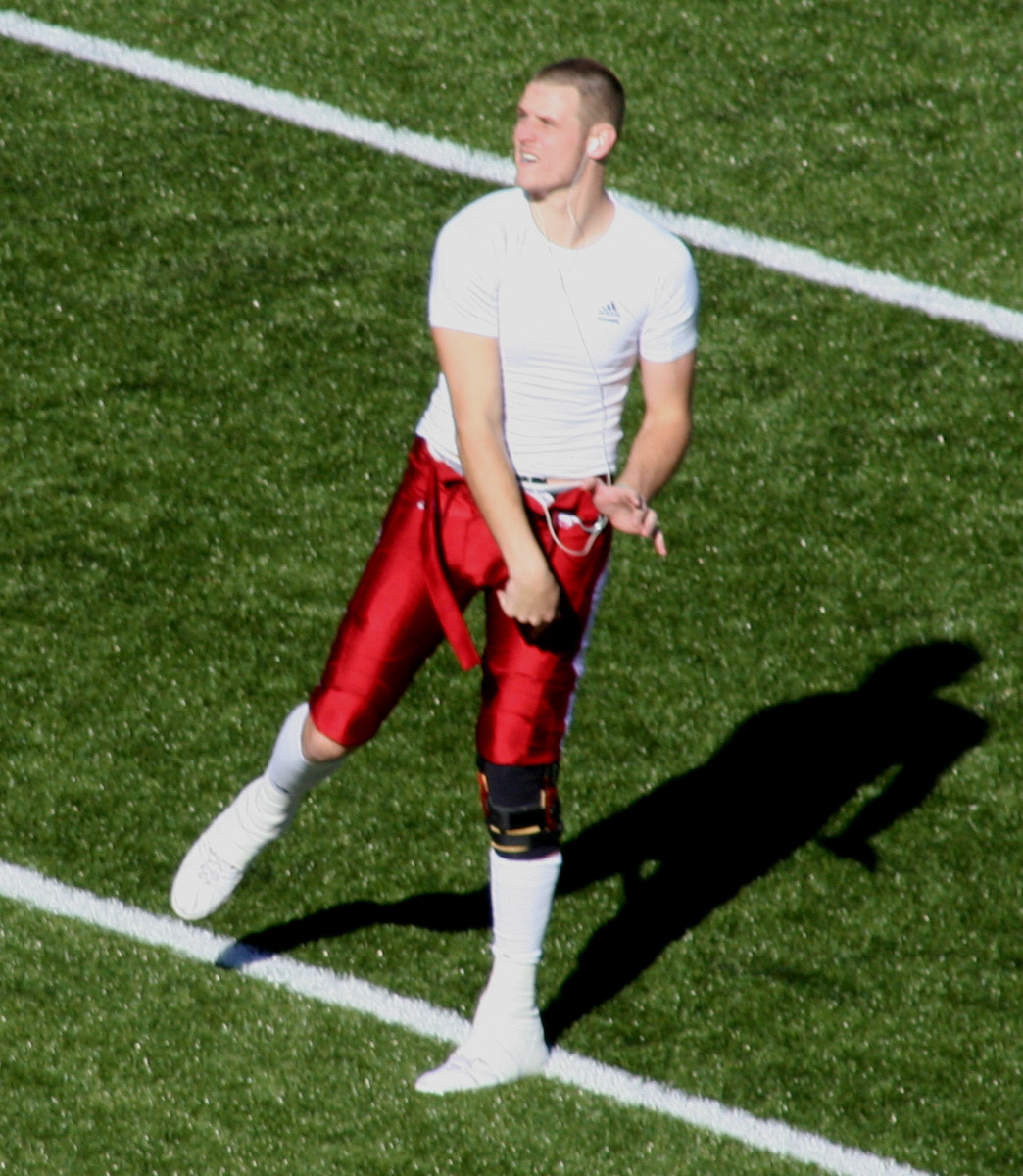
Ryan Mallett was drafted 74th overall by the New England Patriots in the 2011 NFL draft

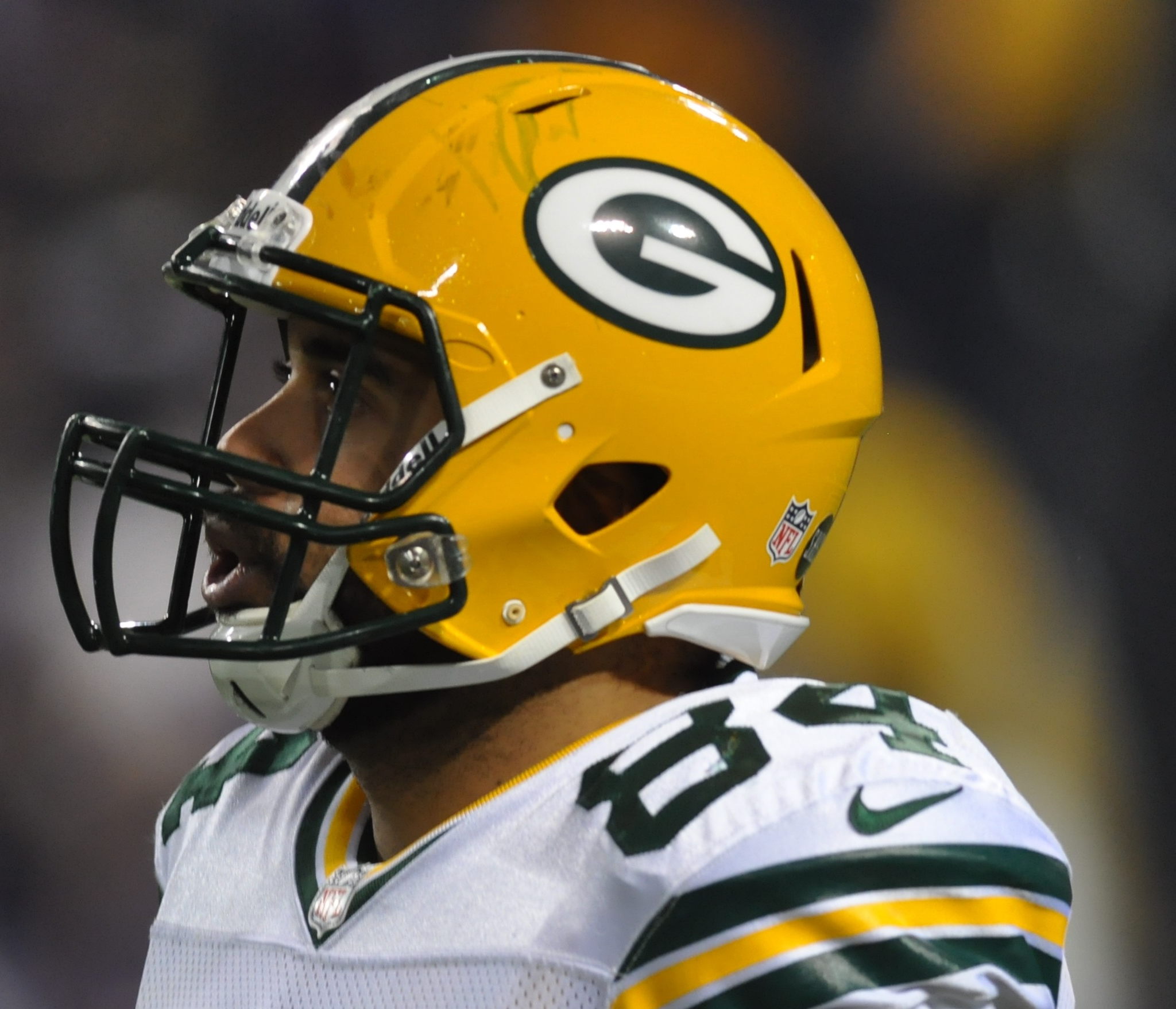
D.J. Williams was drafted 141st overall by the Green Bay Packers in the 2011 NFL draft

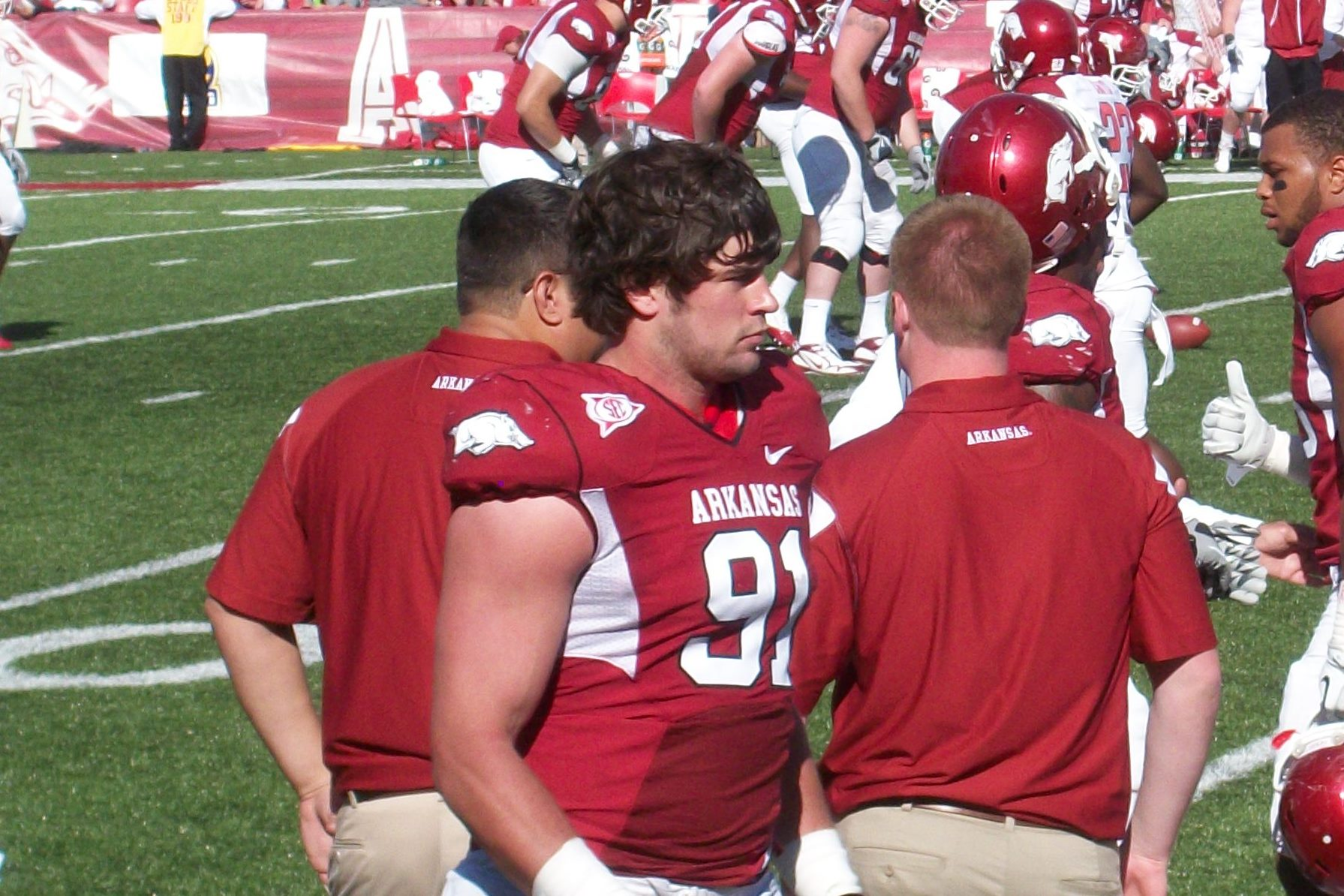
Jake Bequette was drafted 90th overall by the New England Patriots in the 2012 NFL draft

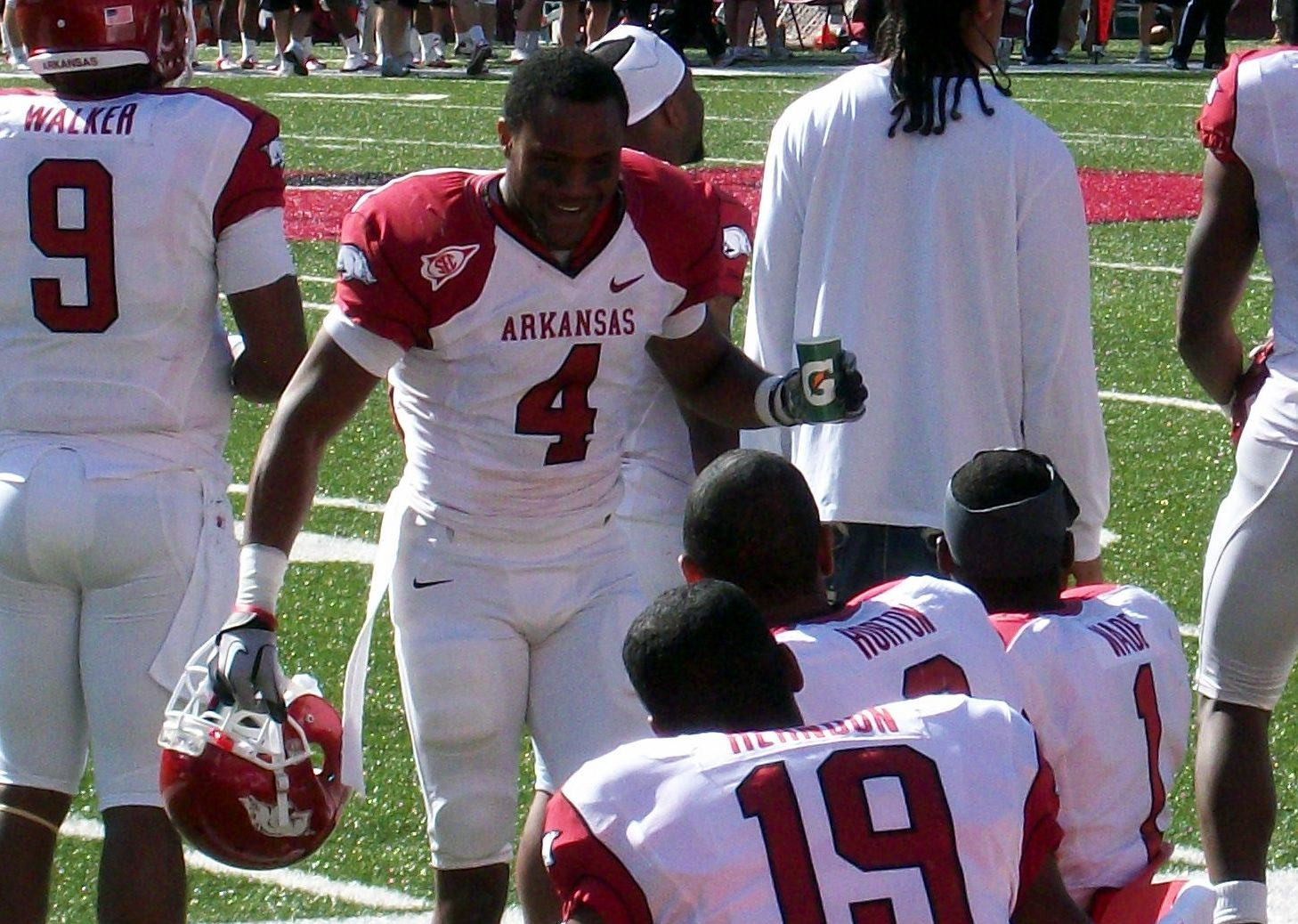
Jarius Wright was drafted 118th overall by the Minnesota Vikings in the 2012 NFL draft

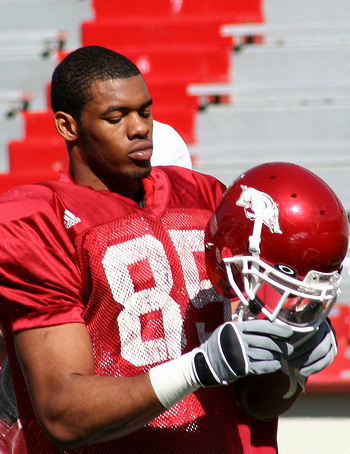
Greg Childs was drafted 134th overall by the Minnesota Vikings in the 2012 NFL draft

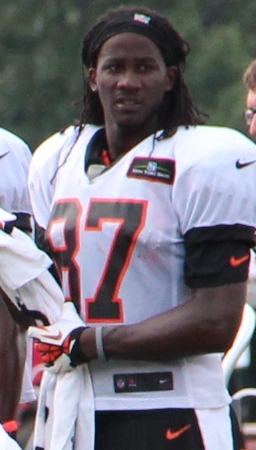
Cobi Hamilton was drafted 197th overall by the Cincinnati Bengals in the 2013 NFL draft

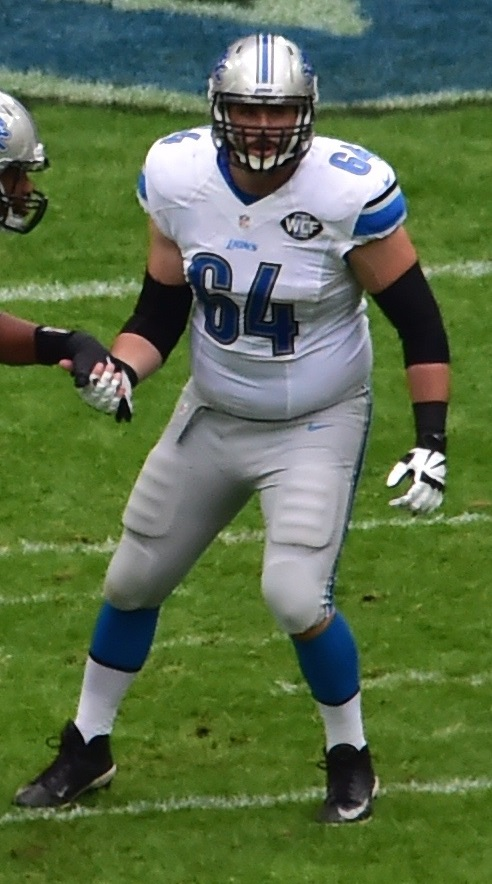
Travis Swanson was drafted 76th overall by the Detroit Lions in the 2014 NFL draft

=== American Football League ===
Year	Round	Pick	Player name	Position	AFL team (Note: This is the team that drafted the player, not their most recent team.)	Notes
1961	12	90	Wayne Harris	C	Boston Patriots	—
1961	17	134	Jarrell Williams	HB	Dallas Texans	—
1962	2	9	Lance Alworth^{‡} (Note: Lance Alworth was drafted in the 1962 AFL draft by the Oakland Raiders (9th overall) and in the 1962 NFL draft by the San Francisco 49ers (8th overall).)	WR	Oakland Raiders	AFL All-Star (1963, 1964, 1965, 1966, 1967, 1968, 1969); AFL champion (1963), Super Bowl champion (VI)
1962	29	232	Paul Dudley (Note: Paul Dudley was drafted in the 1961 NFL draft by the Green Bay Packers (54th overall) and in the 1962 AFL draft by the San Diego Chargers (232nd overall).)	HB	San Diego Chargers	—
1962	31	244	Jim Collier (Note: Jim Collier was drafted in the 1961 NFL draft by the New York Giants (95th overall) and in the 1962 AFL draft by the Buffalo Bills (244th overall).)	TE	Buffalo Bills	—
1963	1	6	Danny Brabham (Note: Dann Brabham was drafted in the 1963 AFL draft by the Houston Oilers (6th overall) and in the 1963 NFL draft by the St. Louis Cardinals (30th overall).)	LB	Houston Oilers	—
1963	13	100	Dave Adams (Note: Dave Adams was drafted three times in the 1963 AFL draft by the Boston Patriots (100th overall and 215th overall) and by the Kansas City Chiefs (184th overall); Adams was drafted once in the 1963 NFL draft by the Washington Redskins (218th overall).)	G	Boston Patriots	—
1963	23	184	Dave Adams	G	Kansas City Chiefs	—
1963	27	215	Dave Adams	G	Boston Patriots	—
1963	16	126	Wes Bryant (Note: Wes Bryant was drafted in the 1963 AFL draft by the Boston Patriots (126th overall) and in the 1964 NFL draft by the Detroit Lions (90th overall).)	T	Boston Patriots	—
1963	23	181	Billy Moody (Note: Billy Moody was drafted in the 1963 NFL draft by the Los Angeles Rams (155th overall) and in the 1963 AFL draft by the Denver Broncos (181st overall).)	HB	Denver Broncos	—
1963	25	194	Jerry Mazzanti (Note: Jerry Mazzanti was drafted in the 1962 NFL draft by the Philadelphia Eagles (223rd overall) and in the 1963 AFL draft by the San Diego Chargers (194th overall).)	DE	San Diego Chargers	—
1963	27	216	Bill Clay (Note: Bill Clay was drafted in the 1963 AFL draft by the Kansas City Chiefs (216th overall) and in the 1963 NFL draft by the St. Louis Cardinals (269th overall).)	E	Kansas City Chiefs	—
1964	19	146	Jerry Lamb (Note: Jerry Lamb was drafted in the 1964 NFL draft by the St. Louis Cardinals (93rd overall) and in the 1964 AFL draft by the Kansas City Chiefs (146th overall).)	E	Kansas City Chiefs	—
1964	26	207	Gordon Quest (Note: Gordon Quest was drafted in the 1964 AFL draft by the Oakland Raiders (207th overall) and in the 1964 NFL draft by the Washington Redskins (270th overall).)	QB	Oakland Raiders	—
1965	2	16	Ronnie Caveness (Note: Ronnie Caveness was drafted in the 1965 AFL draft by the Kansas City Chiefs (16tth overall) and in the 1965 NFL draft by the Los Angeles Rams (121st overall).)	LB	Kansas City Chiefs	—
1966	2	17	Jim Lindsey (Note: Jim Lindsey was drafted in the 1966 AFL draft by the Buffalo Bills (17th overall) and in the 1966 NFL draft by the Minnesota Vikings (27th overall).)	RB	Buffalo Bills	—
1966	4	33	Bobby Burnett* (Note: Bobby Burnett was drafted in the 1966 AFL draft by the Buffalo Bills (33rd overall) and in the 1966 NFL draft by the Chicago Bears (152nd overall).)	RB	Buffalo Bills	AFL All-Star (1967)
1966	17	146	Mike Bender (Note: Mike Bender was drafted in the 1966 NFL draft by the Atlanta Falcons (141st overall) and in the 1966 AFL draft by the Miami Dolphins (146th overall).)	G	Miami Dolphins	—
1966	10	91	Bobby Crockett (Note: Bobby Crockett was drafted in the 1966 AFL draft by the Buffalo Bills (91st overall) and in the 1966 NFL draft by the New York Giants (282nd overall).)	WR	Buffalo Bills	—

=== National Football League ===
Year	Round	Pick	Player name	Position	NFL team	Notes
1938	1	5	Jack Robbins	HB	Chicago Cardinals	—
1938	2	11	Jim Benton^{†}	E	Cleveland Rams	NFL champion (1943, 1945)
1938	6	41	Ray Hamilton	E	Cleveland Rams	—
1938	10	85	Dwight Sloan	B	Chicago Cardinals	—
1939	7	60	Lloyd Woodell	C	New York Giants	—
1940	1	3	Kay Eakin	HB	Pittsburgh Pirates	—
1940	6	43	Saul Singer	T	Philadelphia Eagles	—
1940	9	75	Wilfred Thorpe	G	Cleveland Rams	—
1940	16	148	Bolo Perdue	DE	Washington Redskins	—
1941	6	98	Red Hickey^{†}	E	Philadelphia Eagles	NFL champion (1945)
1941	9	74	Milt Simington*	G	Cleveland Rams	NFL All-Star (1942)
1941	13	115	Maurice Britt	E	Detroit Lions	—
1941	15	137	Johnny Frieberger	E	Green Bay Packers	—
1942	16	145	Firman Bynum	T	Detroit Lions	—
1942	17	157	R. C. Pitts	E	Brooklyn Dodgers	—
1943	11	98	Bob Forte	B	Green Bay Packers	—
1943	23	212	Jay Lawhorn	T	Philadelphia Eagles	—
1943	24	227	Harry Wynne	E	Pittsburgh Steelers	—
1943	27	254	Bob Green	T	Brooklyn Dodgers	—
1944	11	104	Virgil Johnson	E	Green Bay Packers	—
1944	22	229	David Jones	B	Cleveland Rams	—
1944	29	302	Paul Paladino	G	Green Bay Packers	—
1945	9	79	Leon Pense	DB	Pittsburgh Steelers	—
1945	9	87	Lamar Dingler	E	Green Bay Packers	—
1945	11	102	Ben Jones	E	Boston Yanks	—
1945	11	108	Jim Young	T	New York Giants	—
1945	13	130	Bob Boozer	T	New York Giants	—
1945	14	142	Marv Lindsey	B	Green Bay Packers	—
1945	20	199	Charley Lively	T	Boston Yanks	—
1945	29	306	Ray Pipkin	B	New York Giants	—
1946	9	80	Mike Schumchyk	E	Los Angeles Rams	—
1946	29	271	Alton Baldwin (Note: Alton Baldwin was drafted in the 1946 NFL draft by the Chicago Cardinals (271st overall) and in the 1947 NFL draft by the Boston Yanks (25th overall).)	E	Chicago Cardinals	—
1947	4	25	Alton Baldwin	E	Boston Yanks	—
1947	15	128	Earl Wheeler	C	Washington Redskins	—
1947	26	241	Herm Lubker	E	Green Bay Packers	—
1948	1	8	Clyde Scott^{†}	HB	Philadelphia Eagles	NFL champion (1949, 1952)
1948	4	25	Jim Minor	T	Detroit Lions	—
1948	5	27	Don Richards	T	Green Bay Packers	—
1948	18	162	Aubrey Fowler	HB	Philadelphia Eagles	—
1948	20	181	Floyd Thomas	C	Green Bay Packers	—
1948	23	206	Theron Roberts	G	New York Giants	—
1949	5	49	John Hoffman*	HB	Chicago Bears	Pro Bowl (1953, 1955)
1949	17	168	Ross Pritchard	B	Washington Redskins	—
1949	22	217	Ed Hamilton	E	Los Angeles Rams	—
1949	25	243	Frank Lambright	G	Green Bay Packers	—
1950	2	15	Leon Campbell (Note: Leon Campbell was drafted in the 1950 NFL draft by the Baltimore Colts (15th overall) and in the 1951 NFL draft by the Chicago Bears (336th overall).)	FB	Baltimore Colts	—
1950	9	106	Bill Bass	B	Baltimore Colts	—
1950	12	155	John Lunney	G	Los Angeles Rams	—
1950	14	183	Billy Hix	E	Philadelphia Eagles	—
1950	18	227	Alvin Duke	B	Washington Redskins	—
1950	26	327	Geno Mazzanti	HB	Baltimore Colts	—
1951	8	93	Jack Richards	E	Philadelphia Eagles	—
1951	10	116	Louis Schaufele	B	Philadelphia Eagles	—
1951	26	221	Buddy Brown	G	Washington Redskins	—
1951	26	312	Buddy Rogers	B	Chicago Bears	—
1951	26	315	Fred Williams^{†} (Note: Fred Williams was drafted in the 1951 NFL draft by the Cleveland Browns (315th overall) and in the 1952 NFL draft by the Chicago Bears (56th overall).)	DT	Cleveland Browns	NFL champion (1963)
1951	28	332	Marv Stendel	E	Philadelphia Eagles	—
1951	28	336	Leon Campbell	FB	Chicago Bears	—
1952	2	25	Bob Griffin	LB	Los Angeles Rams	—
1952	4	45	Pat Summerall^{†}	E	Detroit Lions	NFL champion (1952)
1952	5	52	Dave Hanner^{†}	DT	Green Bay Packers	NFL champion (1961, 1962)
1952	5	56	Fred Williams^{†}	DT	Chicago Bears	NFL champion (1963)
1952	8	92	Billy Jurney	E	Chicago Bears	—
1952	13	146	Bill Ward	G	New York Giants	—
1952	20	232	Frank Fischel	E	Chicago Cardinals	—
1953	8	97	Lew Carpenter^{†}	HB	Detroit Lions	NFL champion (1953, 1961, 1962)
1953	10	110	John Cole	B	Baltimore Colts	—
1953	15	170	Buddy Sutton	B	Baltimore Colts	—
1954	1	2	Lamar McHan	QB	Chicago Cardinals	—
1954	6	71	Floyd Sagely	DB	San Francisco 49ers	—
1954	8	90	Tom Garlington	T	Chicago Bears	—
1954	14	158	Sammy Dumas	G	Chicago Cardinals	—
1954	17	194	Jack Troxell	B	Chicago Cardinals	—
1954	19	229	Buster Graves	T	Detroit Lions	—
1955	5	13	Bud Brooks	G	Detroit Lions	—
1955	27	316	A. J. Baker	B	Washington Redskins	—
1956	1	13	Preston Carpenter*	E	Cleveland Browns	Pro Bowl (1962)
1956	2	19	Henry Moore	DB	New York Giants	—
1956	27	316	Buddy Benson	B	Pittsburgh Steelers	—
1956	27	321	Gerry Nesbitt	B	New York Giants	—
1956	28	333	Bill Fuller	T	New York Giants	—
1957	3	26	Billy Ray Smith Sr.^{†}	DT	Los Angeles Rams	Super Bowl champion (V)
1957	3	28	George Walker	B	Cleveland Browns	—
1957	5	54	Ronnie Underwood	B	Baltimore Colts	—
1958	21	251	Don Christian	B	San Francisco 49ers	—
1959	20	229	Charley Sample	B	Green Bay Packers	—
1959	21	249	Donnie Stone^{‡}	HB	Chicago Bears	AFL All-Star (1961); AFL champion (1965)
1961	4	54	Paul Dudley	B	Green Bay Packers	—
1961	7	95	Jim Collier	TE	New York Giants	—
1962	1	8	Lance Alworth^{‡}	WR	San Francisco 49ers	AFL All-Star (1963, 1964, 1965, 1966, 1967, 1968, 1969); AFL champion (1963), Super Bowl champion (VI)
1962	10	127	John Childress	G	Washington Redskins	—
1962	13	180	George McKinney	B	Philadelphia Eagles	—
1962	16	223	Jerry Mazzanti	DE	Philadelphia Eagles	—
1963	3	30	Danny Brabham	LB	St. Louis Cardinals	—
1963	12	155	Billy Moody	HB	Los Angeles Rams	—
1963	16	218	Dave Adams	G	Washington Redskins	—
1963	20	269	Bill Clay	E	St. Louis Cardinals	—
1964	7	90	Wes Bryant	T	Detroit Lions	—
1964	7	93	Jerry Lamb	E	St. Louis Cardinals	—
1964	20	270	Gordon Quest	QB	Washington Redskins	—
1965	6	82	Glen Ray Hines*	T	St. Louis Cardinals	Pro Bowl (1968, 1969)
1965	9	121	Ronnie Caveness	LB	Los Angeles Rams	—
1966	2	27	James Lindsey	RB	Minnesota Vikings	—
1966	9	136	Dick Cunningham	T	Detroit Lions	—
1966	10	141	Mike Bender	G	Atlanta Falcons	—
1966	10	152	Bobby Burnett*	RB	Chicago Bears	AFL All-Star (1967)
1966	16	237	Jim Williams	DE	Minnesota Vikings	—
1966	19	282	Bobby Crockett	WR	New York Giants	—
1967	1	10	Loyd Phillips	DE	Chicago Bears	—
1967	1	19	Harry Jones	RB	Philadelphia Eagles	—
1967	6	151	Martine Bercher	DB	Atlanta Falcons	—
1968	2	36	Ernie Ruple	T	Pittsburgh Steelers	—
1968	5	115	Ronnie South	QB	New Orleans Saints	—
1969	5	121	Jim Barnes	G	Minnesota Vikings	—
1969	8	197	Webster Hubbell	G	Chicago Bears	—
1969	12	288	Gary Adams	DB	Philadelphia Eagles	—
1970	6	150	Terry Stewart	DB	New York Jets	—
1970	8	205	Jerry Dossey	G	Dallas Cowboys	—
1970	10	253	Bruce Maxwell	RB	Detroit Lions	—
1970	10	260	Bob Stankovich	G	Kansas City Chiefs	—
1970	14	350	Rodney Brand	C	New York Giants	—
1970	17	423	Cliff Powell	LB	St. Louis Cardinals	—
1971	4	89	Jerry Moore	DB	Chicago Bears	—
1971	7	169	Chuck Dicus	WR	San Diego Chargers	—
1971	9	234	Bill Burnett	RB	Baltimore Colts	—
1971	16	395	Bruce James	LB	Philadelphia Eagles	—
1971	17	419	Pat Morrison	TE	Buffalo Bills	—
1972	3	61	Bill McClard	K	San Diego Chargers	—
1972	8	184	Tom Mabry	T	New York Giants	—
1972	9	220	Mike Kelson	T	New England Patriots	—
1972	11	265	Ronnie Jones	LB	St. Louis Cardinals	—
1973	3	57	Joe Ferguson	QB	Buffalo Bills	—
1973	5	106	Dave Reavis^{†}	DE	Pittsburgh Steelers	Super Bowl champion (IX, X)
1973	8	195	Tom Reed	G	Atlanta Falcons	—
1973	9	215	Mike Reppond	WR	Buffalo Bills	—
1973	10	258	Don Wunderly	DT	Pittsburgh Steelers	—
1973	12	291	Mike Griffin	G	Chicago Bears	—
1973	17	428	Jim Hodge	WR	Atlanta Falcons	—
1974	6	140	Danny Rhodes	LB	Baltimore Colts	—
1974	7	160	Jack Ettinger	WR	Chicago Bears	—
1974	11	283	Dickey Morton	RB	Pittsburgh Steelers	—
1975	6	145	Rollen Smith	DB	Cincinnati Bengals	—
1975	9	215	Floyd Hogan	DB	Cleveland Browns	—
1975	12	287	Marsh White	RB	New York Giants	—
1975	15	380	Brison Manor	DT	New York Jets	—
1976	2	35	Ike Forte	RB	New England Patriots	—
1976	5	143	Mike Kirkland	QB	Baltimore Colts	—
1976	6	177	Scott Bull	QB	San Francisco 49ers	—
1976	8	216	Richard LaFargue	C	Philadelphia Eagles	—
1976	11	319	Rolland Fuchs	RB	Pittsburgh Steelers	—
1977	2	36	R. C. Thielemann^{‡}	G	Atlanta Falcons	Pro Bowl (1981, 1982, 1983); Super Bowl champion (XXII)
1977	2	39	Greg Koch	T	Green Bay Packers	—
1977	4	109	Gerald Skinner	T	New England Patriots	—
1977	5	132	Dennis Winston^{†}	LB	Pittsburgh Steelers	Super Bowl champion (XIII, XIV)
1977	10	265	Curtis Townsend	LB	San Diego Chargers	—
1978	1	15	Steve Little	K	St. Louis Cardinals	—
1978	6	144	Leotis Harris	G	Green Bay Packers	—
1979	1	4	Dan Hampton^{‡}	DT	Chicago Bears	Pro Bowl (1980, 1982, 1984, 1985); Super Bowl champion (XX)
1979	3	60	Jerry Eckwood	RB	Tampa Bay Buccaneers	—
1979	4	91	Vaughn Lusby	DB	Cincinnati Bengals	—
1979	4	94	Ben Cowins	RB	Philadelphia Eagles	—
1979	12	305	Michael Forrest	RB	Kansas City Chiefs	—
1980	5	120	Tom Ginn	C	Detroit Lions	—
1980	11	291	Mike Massey	LB	Oakland Raiders	—
1980	11	294	Roland Sales	RB	Cleveland Browns	—
1980	12	332	Kevin Scanlon	QB	Los Angeles Rams	—
1981	5	134	Steve Cox^{†}	P	Cleveland Browns	Super Bowl champion (XXII)
1981	6	162	Bobby Duckworth	WR	San Diego Chargers	—
1981	8	215	Kevin Evans	DB	New Orleans Saints	—
1981	9	238	Hugh Jernigan	DB	Detroit Lions	—
1981	10	259	Trent Bryant	DB	Baltimore Colts	—
1982	12	322	Jeff Goff	LB	Washington Redskins	—
1983	1	5	Billy Ray Smith Jr.	LB	San Diego Chargers	—
1983	1	20	Gary Anderson*	RB	San Diego Chargers	Pro Bowl (1986)
1983	2	38	Steve Korte	C	New Orleans Saints	—
1983	4	95	Danny Walters	DB	San Diego Chargers	—
1983	7	188	Jessie Clark (Note: Jessie Clark later transferred to Louisiana Tech University.)	RB	Green Bay Packers	—
1984	1	15	Ron Faurot	DE	New York Jets	—
1984	9	235	Johnny Mann	FB	Pittsburgh Steelers	—
1984S	3	79	Phillip Boren (Note: Phillip Boren was drafted in the 1984 NFL supplemental draft of USFL and CFL players.)	T	Pittsburgh Steelers	—
1985	12	312	Dave Burnette (Note: Dave Burnette later transferred to the University of Central Arkansas.)	T	Indianapolis Colts	—
1986	2	53	Greg Lasker	DB	New York Giants	—
1986	5	113	Ravin Caldwell^{†}	LB	Washington Redskins	Super Bowl champion (XXII, XXVI)
1986	5	126	Bobby Joe Edmonds*	WR	Seattle Seahawks	Pro Bowl (1986)
1986	5	127	Nick Miller	LB	Cleveland Browns	—
1986	5	136	Kevin Wyatt	DB	Miami Dolphins	—
1987	5	139	Greg Horne	P	Cincinnati Bengals	—
1987	12	317	Theo Young	TE	Pittsburgh Steelers	—
1989	1	19	Wayne Martin*	DE	New Orleans Saints	Pro Bowl (1994)
1989	1	20	Steve Atwater^{‡}	DB	Denver Broncos	Pro Bowl (1990, 1991, 1992, 1993, 1994, 1995, 1996, 1998); Super Bowl champion (XXXII, XXXIII)
1989	2	55	Fred Childress	G	Cincinnati Bengals	—
1989	4	89	Kerry Owens	LB	Cincinnati Bengals	—
1989	7	189	Richard Brothers	DB	Chicago Bears	—
1989	9	234	Kendall Trainor	K	Phoenix Cardinals	—
1989	9	243	LaSalle Harper	LB	Chicago Bears	—
1990	5	128	Barry Foster*	RB	Pittsburgh Steelers	Pro Bowl (1992, 1993)
1990	8	200	James Rouse	RB	Chicago Bears	—
1990	8	216	Elbert Crawford	G	Los Angeles Rams	—
1990	12	310	Anthony Cooney	DB	Chicago Bears	—
1991	4	89	Derek Russell	WR	Denver Broncos	—
1993	4	95	Layne Mathis	FB	Pittsburgh steelers	—
1994	1	26	Henry Ford	DT	Houston Oilers	—
1994	2	43	Isaac Davis	G	San Diego Chargers	—
1996	3	72	Steve Conley	LB	Pittsburgh Steelers	—
1996	5	155	Junior Soli	DT	San Diego Chargers	—
1996	7	231	Freddie Bradley (Note: Freddie Bradley later transferred to Sonoma State University.)	RB	San Diego Chargers	—
1997	5	160	Anthony Hicks	LB	Green Bay Packers	—
1997	6	171	Mike Cherry (Note: Mike Cherry later transferred to Murray State University.)	QB	New York Giants	—
1998	7	235	David Sanders	DE	Oakland Raiders	—
1999	3	63	Brandon Burlsworth	G	Indianapolis Colts	—
1999	4	120	Kenny Wright (Note: Kenny Wright later transferred to Northwestern State University.)	DB	Minnesota Vikings	—
1999	6	202	Melvin Bradley	DE	Arizona Cardinals	—
1999	7	207	Madre Hill	RB	Cleveland Browns	—
1999	7	212	Chris Akins^{†} (Note: Chris Akins later transferred to the University of Arkansas at Pine Bluff.)	DB	Carolina Panthers	Super Bowl champion (XXXVIII)
1999	7	225	Ryan Hale	DT	New York Giants	—
2000	2	45	Kenoy Kennedy	DB	Denver Broncos	—
2000	2	61	Bobbie Williams^{†}	G	Philadelphia Eagles	Super Bowl champion (XLVII)
2000	4	102	David Barrett	DB	Arizona Cardinals	—
2000	4	114	Anthony Lucas	WR	Green Bay Packers	—
2000	6	196	Emanuel Smith	WR	Jacksonville Jaguars	—
2001	2	55	Quinton Caver	LB	Philadelphia Eagles	—
2001	6	167	Randy Garner	DE	Atlanta Falcons	—
2002	4	100	Dante Wesley (Note: Dante Wesley later transferred to the University of Arkansas at Pine Bluff.)	DB	Carolina Panthers	—
2002	7	240	Carlos Hall	DB	Tennessee Titans	—
2003	2	42	Ken Hamlin*	DB	Seattle Seahawks	Pro Bowl (2007)
2004	1	16	Shawn Andrews*	G	Philadelphia Eagles	Pro Bowl (2006, 2007)
2004	1	25	Ahmad Carroll	DB	Green Bay Packers	—
2004	3	80	Caleb Miller	LB	Cincinnati Bengals	—
2004	4	128	Cedric Cobbs*	RB	New England Patriots	Super Bowl champion (XXXIX)
2004	5	160	Tony Bua	LB	Miami Dolphins	—
2004	6	177	Bo Lacy	T	Pittsburgh Steelers	—
2005	1	21	Matt Jones	WR	Jacksonville Jaguars	—
2005	5	159	Jeb Huckeba	LB	Seattle Seahawks	—
2006	7	254	Vickiel Vaughn	DB	San Francisco 49ers	—
2006	2	64	Tarvaris Jackson* (Note: Tarvaris Jackson later transferred to Alabama State University.)	QB	Minnesota Vikings	Super Bowl champion (XLVIII)
2007	1	8	Jamaal Anderson	DE	Atlanta Falcons	—
2007	2	41	Chris Houston	DB	Atlanta Falcons	—
2007	2	42	Tony Ugoh*	T	Indianapolis Colts	Super Bowl champion (XLVI)
2007	5	173	Michael Coe (Note: Michael Coe later transferred to Alabama State University.)	DB	Indianapolis Colts	—
2007	7	248	Keith Jackson	DT	St. Louis Rams	—
2008	1	4	Darren McFadden	RB	Oakland Raiders	—
2008	1	22	Felix Jones	RB	Dallas Cowboys	—
2008	3	90	Marcus Harrison	DT	Chicago Bears	—
2008	7	211	Nate Garner	T	New York Jets	—
2008	7	227	Peyton Hillis	FB	Denver Broncos	—
2008	7	248	Marcus Monk	WR	Chicago Bears	—
2009	4	106	Jonathan Luigs	C	Cincinnati Bengals	—
2010	3	77	Damian Williams (Note: Damian Williams later transferred to the University of Southern California.)	WR	Tennessee Titans	—
2010	5	147	Mitch Petrus*	G	New York Giants	Super Bowl champion (XLVI)
2011	3	74	Ryan Mallett	QB	New England Patriots	—
2011	5	141	D. J. Williams	TE	Green Bay Packers	—
2011	6	168	DeMarcus Love	T	Minnesota Vikings	—
2012	3	90	Jake Bequette	DE	New England Patriots	—
2012	4	104	Joe Adams	WR	Carolina Panthers	—
2012	4	118	Jarius Wright	WR	Minnesota Vikings	—
2012	4	134	Greg Childs	WR	Minnesota Vikings	—
2013	3	96	Knile Davis	RB	Kansas City Chiefs	—
2013	4	112	Tyler Wilson	QB	Oakland Raiders	—
2013	6	197	Cobi Hamilton	WR	Cincinnati Bengals	—
2013	7	222	Chris Gragg	TE	Buffalo Bills	—
2014	3	76	Travis Swanson	C	Detroit Lions	—
2014	5	159	Chris Smith	DE	Jacksonville Jaguars	—
2014	7	227	Kiero Small	RB	Seattle Seahawks	—
2014	7	228	Zach Hocker	K	Washington Redskins	—
2015	4	101	Trey Flowers	DE	New England Patriots	Super Bowl champion (LI, LIII)
2015	5	141	Martrell Spaight	LB	Washington Redskins	—
2015	6	182	Tevin Mitchel	CB	Washington Redskins	—
2015	6	192	Darius Philon	DT	San Diego Chargers	—
2015	6	202	A. J. Derby	TE	New England Patriots	—
2016	2	35	Hunter Henry	TE	San Diego Chargers	—
2016	5	156	Jonathan Williams	RB	Buffalo Bills	—
2016	5	171	Alex Collins	RB	Seattle Seahawks	—
2016	6	193	Sebastian Tretola	G	Tennessee Titans	—
2016	6	201	Brandon Allen	QB	Jacksonville Jaguars	—
2017	4	131	Deatrich Wise Jr.	DE	New England Patriots	—
2017	5	154	Jeremy Sprinkle	TE	Washington Redskins	—
2017	6	205	Jeremiah Ledbetter	DE	Detroit Lions	—
2018	1	20	Frank Ragnow	C	Detroit Lions	—
2018	7	226	David Williams	RB	Denver Broncos	—
2019	4	118	Hjalte Froholdt	G	New England Patriots	—
2019	5	148	Dre Greenlaw	LB	San Francisco 49ers	—
2019	6	190	Armon Watts	DT	Minnesota Vikings	—
2020	3	95	McTelvin Agim	DT	Denver Broncos	—
2020	7	216	Kamren Curl	DB	Washington Redskins	—
2021	6	207	Jonathan Marshall	DT	New York Jets	—
2022	1	18	Treylon Burks	WR	Tennessee Titans	—
2022	5	178	John Ridgeway III	DT	Dallas Cowboys	—
2022	7	222	Montaric Brown	CB	Jacksonville Jaguars	—
2023	3	67	Drew Sanders	LB	Denver Broncos	—
2023	3	97	Ricky Stromberg	C	Washington Commanders	—
2024	6	212	Cam Little	K	Jacksonville Jaguars	—
2024	6	217	Beaux Limmer	C	Los Angeles Rams	—
2025	3	70	Isaac TeSlaa	WR	Detroit Lions	—
2025	3	72	Landon Jackson	DE	Buffalo Bills	—
2026	3	99	Julian Neal	CB	Seattle Seahawks	—
2026	4	122	Mike Washington Jr.	RB	Las Vegas Raiders	—
2026	5	122	Fernando Carmona	G	Tennessee Titans	—
2026	6	182	Taylen Green	QB	Cleveland Browns	—
