= Dudley (disambiguation) =

Dudley is a town in the West Midlands of England.

Dudley or Dudly may also refer to:

== Places ==
=== Australia ===
- Dudley, New South Wales, a suburb of Newcastle
- Dudley County, New South Wales
- Hundred of Dudley, a cadastral division on Kangaroo Island, South Australia
  - District Council of Dudley, a former local government area
  - Dudley Conservation Park, a protected area in South Australia
  - Dudley Peninsula, a peninsula (in South Australia)

=== Canada ===
- Dudley, Ontario, a community in the township of Muskoka Lakes, Ontario

=== United Kingdom ===
- Metropolitan Borough of Dudley, West Midlands
- Dudley (UK Parliament constituency), centred on the town of Dudley
- County Borough of Dudley, a former government district
- Dudley, Tyne and Wear

=== United States ===
- Dudley, Georgia, a city
- Dudley, Iowa, a ghost town
- Dudley, Polk County, Iowa, a ghost town
- Dudley, Massachusetts, a town
- Dudley, Minnesota, unincorporated community
- Dudley, Missouri, a city
- Dudley, North Carolina, an unincorporated town
- Dudley, Ohio, an unincorporated community
- Dudley, Pennsylvania, a borough
- Dudley, South Dakota, a census-designated place
- Dudley, Wisconsin, an unincorporated community
- Dudleytown, Connecticut, a ghost town
- Dudley Township, Henry County, Indiana
- Dudley Township, Haskell County, Kansas
- Dudley Township, Ohio
- Dudley Township, Clearwater County, Minnesota
- Dudley Observatory, an astronomical observatory in Schenectady, New York
- Nubian Square (formerly Dudley Square), Roxbury, Boston, Massachusetts
  - Nubian station (formerly Dudley station), a bus terminal in Nubian Square
- Camp Dudley, a boys camp in upstate New York

== People and fictional characters ==
- Dudley (given name), a list of people and fictional characters
- Dudley (surname), a list of people

== Titles ==
- Earl of Dudley
- Baron Dudley
- Baron of Dudley, a Scottish feudal barony

== Other uses ==
- Calymene blumenbachii, a trilobite nicknamed the Dudley Bug or Dudley Locust
- Dudley (dog), a type of Labrador Retriever
- Dudly Bug or Dudly, a cyclecar manufactured between 1913 and 1915
- Dudley (TV series), a CBS sitcom starring Dudley Moore and Joanna Cassidy
- Dudley College, Dudley, West Midlands, England
- Dudley (company), lock manufacturer, now brand of Master Lock

== See also ==
- Dudley Park (disambiguation)
- The Dudley Brothers, professional wrestling tag team / stable
- The Dudley Boyz, a tag team made up of two of the Dudley Brothers
