= Dud (disambiguation) =

A dud is an ammunition round or explosive that fails to fire or detonate.

Dud, DUD, Duds or Dudd may also refer to:

== Film and television ==
- Duds (film), a 1920 American silent mystery
- Dud, a comedy character; see Pete and Dud
- Dudd, in Spanish animated series Glumpers
- Dudley A. "Dud" Wash, one of The Darlings, on The Andy Griffith Show

== People ==
=== In sport ===
- Dud Beattie (1934–2016), Australian rugby league player
- Dud Branom (1897–1980), American baseball infielder
- Dudley DeGroot (1899–1970), American football coach
- Ernest Dud Lee (1899–1971), American baseball infielder
- Dud Millard (1901–1954), Australian rugby league player
- Dudley Perkins (motorcyclist) (1893–1978), American motorbike dealer and racer
- Dudley Richards (1932–1961), American figure skater

=== Others ===
- Dudd (died between 781 and 785), Bishop of Winchester
- William Odell Dud Bascomb (1916–1972), American jazz trumpeter
- Dudd or Dud Dudley (1600–1684), English metallurgist, soldier, military engineer and munitions supplier
- Dud Lastrapes (born 1929), American businessman and politician - see List of mayors of Lafayette, Louisiana
- Dud Murra of Wadai (1881–1927), last ruler of Wadai, Central Africa
- Yuri Dud (born 1986), Russian journalist and YouTuber

== Places ==
- Delap-Uliga-Djarrit, Majuro, Marshall Islands
- Dud, Târnova, Arad, Romania
- Dunedin Airport, New Zealand (IATA:DUD)

== Other uses ==
- Duds, slang for clothing
- Hun-Saare language, spoken in Nigeria (ISO 636:dud)

== See also ==
- Milk Duds, a candy
- USS Captain Dud (ID-3507), a US Navy floating derrick
