= Freddie Bradley =

American football player (born 1970)

No. 35
- Position: Running back

Personal information
- Born: June 12, 1970 (age 56); Helena, Arkansas, U.S.
- Listed height: 5 ft 10 in (1.78 m)
- Listed weight: 208 lb (94 kg)

Career information
- High school: Hueneme (Oxnard, California)
- College: Arkansas; Sonoma State
- NFL draft: 1996: 7th round, 231st overall pick

Career history
- San Diego Chargers (1996)

Career NFL statistics
- Rushing yards: 109
- Rushing average: 3.4
- Receptions: 1
- Receiving yards: 20
- Stats at Pro Football Reference

Freddie Lee Bradley, Jr. (born June 12, 1970, in Helena, Arkansas) is an American former professional football player who was a running back for the San Diego Chargers of the National Football League (NFL) in 1996. He played college football for the Arkansas Razorbacks and Sonoma State Seawolves. Bradley was the first player from Hueneme High School drafted by the NFL.

== Early life ==
Freddie Bradley was born in Helena, Arkansas, but moved to California in the ninth grade. His mother died when he was an infant, and he had little contact with his father, so he transferred to California to live with his sister and her six children. He attended Hueneme High School in Oxnard, California, and quickly got into trouble by using drugs and skipping school. Bradley's sister moved back to Arkansas before his junior year, so he moved in with head football coach George Machado. Bradley excelled on the football team and graduated from high school, and he continued to live with the Machados during his time at Moorpark College.

== College career ==
=== Moorpark College ===
Bradley received no scholarship offers from Division I schools due to his poor grades, and instead went to Moorpark College, a junior college in Moorpark, California. Running 4.4 seconds in the 40-yard dash and bench-pressing 360 pounds, Bradley had an immediate impact for Moorpark Head Coach Jim Bittner. He ran for a 93-yard kickoff return touchdown the first time he touched the ball, and eventually rushed for 2123 yards, 32 touchdowns and scored 198 points during his career at Moorpark, breaking O. J. Simpson's national junior college records for all-purpose yards and scoring. Bradley also holds school records for all-purpose yards in a season (2428) and in a career (4123). Bradley ran behind the blocking of Jamal Anderson, who went on to be named NFL All-Pro in 1998 and played in Super Bowl XXXIII with the Atlanta Falcons.

=== University of Arkansas ===
Bradley transferred to the University of Arkansas as a junior for the 1991 season, and rushed for 197 yards on 49 carries (4.0 avg). He also led the team with 16 kickoff returns for 388 yards (24.3 avg.), helping the team a 6–6 record and an appearance the 1991 Independence Bowl, losing to Georgia 24–15.

Bradley's career at Arkansas ended after only one season, when he and teammate Derrick Martin were arrested April 23, 1992, on charges of rape of a thirteen-year-old girl. Bradley and Martin were both dismissed from the team by Head Coach Jack Crowe. Bradley and Martin denied having sex with the girl, and both players were later acquitted of all charges.

=== Sonoma State University ===
After the rape trial, Bradley returned home with his wife and son to Oxnard, California, and missed the entire 1992 season. Bradley feared his football career was over until a friend recommended Sonoma State University, an NCAA Division II program in Rohnert Park, California. A knee injury forced Bradley to take a medical redshirt after playing in the first game of the 1993 season, and he was academically ineligible in 1994. He finally played in 1995, rushing for 726 yards (4.7 avg.) for a Sonoma State team that only had a 1–8 record.

== NFL career ==
=== San Diego Chargers ===
Freddie Bradley, now 26 years old, had only played a complete season once in the previous five seasons leading up the 1996 NFL draft, which made him somewhat of an unknown quantity. Despite playing in obscurity at Sonoma State, he caught the attention of the San Diego Chargers' general manager Bobby Beathard, who selected him in the seventh round (231st pick) of the draft. Bradley became the second player drafted from Sonoma State, following Pro Football Hall of Fame member Larry Allen, who was selected in 1994. Bradley and Allen were teammates at Sonoma State during the 1993 season.

Bradley was second on the Chargers in preseason rushing yards with 134 yards on 37 carries, and led the Chargers' running backs in yards per carry (3.6). He impressed Head Coach Bobby Ross and running backs coach Sylvester Croom with his quickness, explosiveness and strength. Bradley made the team near the end of training camp as the fourth running back behind Leonard Russell, Aaron Hayden, and Terrell Fletcher. During his one season with the Chargers, Bradley rushed 32 times for 109 yards for a team that missed the playoffs with an 8–8 record. Bradley's lone career start came in the final game of the season. He rushed for 60 yards and caught 1 pass for 20 yards, helping the Chargers avoid a losing season by defeating the Denver Broncos 16–10.

== Personal life ==
Freddie Bradley and his wife Edith were married before his arrival at the University of Arkansas, and they were living together in off-campus housing when he was arrested and charged with rape in 1992. He credits her support as a major reason for his being able to get through the difficulties of the rape trial and being out of football. Bradley's son Svondo was a standout defensive lineman at Santa Clara High School. Svondo Bradley rushed for 784 yards while playing fullback and blocking for Cierre Wood, and had 76 tackles with 5.5 sacks as a defensive lineman. He helped lead Santa Clara to a California Interscholastic Federation state title in 2007, and was named First-team All-Frontier League and First-team All-CIF. Svondo went on to play defensive lineman at Ventura College in 2014.

== See also ==
- Arkansas Razorbacks football
- List of Arkansas Razorbacks in the NFL draft
- San Diego Chargers
