= Dudley Bradstreet =

Irish adventurer and spy (1711–1763)

Dudley Bradstreet (1711–1763) was an Irish adventurer and secret government agent. During the Jacobite rising of 1745, Bradstreet was employed by government officials to act as a spy among the rebels. His description of a "third force" of 9,000 men in Northampton ready to fight the Scots (a force which did not in fact exist) is credited with persuading Bonnie Prince Charlie's army to turn back at a council of war in Derby in 1745, effectively ending the Jacobite cause.

== Biography ==
He was born in 1711 in County Tipperary, where his father had obtained considerable property under the Cromwellian grants, which, however, was much reduced by debts. Dudley, his youngest son, was left in his early years in charge of a foster father in Tipperary. While a youth he became a trooper, but soon quit the army and traded unsuccessfully as a linen merchant, and subsequently as a brewer. For several years, in Ireland and England, Bradstreet led an erratic life, occupied mainly in pecuniary projects.

== Jacobite Uprising of 1745 ==
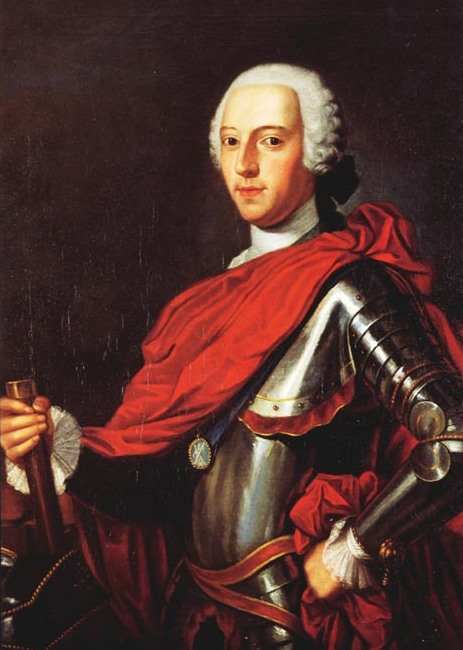
Bonnie Prince Charlie

During the rising of 1745, Bradstreet was employed by government officials to act as a spy among suspected persons. He was also engaged and equipped by the Dukes of Newcastle and Cumberland to furnish them with information on the movements of Prince Charles Edward and his army. Bradstreet assumed the character of a devoted adherent to the Stuart cause, and, under the name of 'Captain Oliver Williams,' obtained access to the prince and his council at Derby. There he acted successfully as a spy for the Duke of Cumberland, and, without being suspected by the Jacobites, persuaded Charles Stuart's army to turn back, by warning of a "third force" of 9,000 men in Northampton ready to fight the Scots (a force which did not in fact exist). After the council, Bradstreet continued on good terms with the rebels, and took his leave as a friend when they commenced their return march to Scotland, a decision which ended Jacobite hopes of seizing London and the Crown. Bradstreet's notices of Prince Charles and his associates are graphic. He describes circumstantially the executions, in August 1746, of the Earl of Kilmarnock and Lord Balmerino, at which he states he was present.

== Later life ==
Although Bradstreet's services as a secret agent were admitted by the government officials, he was unable to obtain from them either money or a commission in the army, which he considered had been promised to him. He, however, succeeded in bringing his case under the notice of the king, from whom he consequently received the sum of one hundred and twenty pounds. Bradstreet subsequently subsisted for a time on the results of schemes, his success in which he ascribed to the 'superstition' of the English people, and 'their credulity and faith in wondrous things.' The last of his devices at London appears to have been that styled the 'bottle conjurer,' which, with the assistance of several confederates, he carried out with great gains in January 1747–48. On his adventures in connection with the affair Bradstreet wrote a play, in five acts, styled 'The Magician, or the Bottle Conjurer,' which he states was revised for him by some of the best judges and actors in England, including Mrs. Woffington, who gave him 'the best advice she could about it.' This play was four times performed with great success at London, but on the fifth night, when Bradstreet was to have taken the part of 'Spy,' the principal character, it was suppressed by the magistrates of Westminster. 'The Bottle Conjurer' was printed by Bradstreet with his 'Life.'

After other adventures, Bradstreet returned to Ireland, where he owned a small property in land. He attempted unsuccessfully to carry on trade as a brewer in Westmeath, and became involved in contests with officials of the excise. To raise funds, he printed an account of his life and adventures (The Life and Uncommon Adventures of Captain Dudley Bradstreet, S. Powell, Dublin, 1755). The work is written with vivacity and descriptive power. Bradstreet died at Multifarnham, Westmeath, in 1763.
