= USS Captain Dud =

United States Navy floating derrick

History

United States
- Name: USS Captain Dud (1918–1920); USS YD-43
- Namesake: Captain Dud was a shortened version of her previous name; YD-43 was her hull number
- Builder: S. Flory at Bangor, Pennsylvania
- Completed: 1914
- Acquired: 1918
- In service: 1918
- Out of service: 1956
- Notes: Operated as Captain Dud S507 1914-1918

General characteristics
- Type: Floating derrick
- Length: 95 ft (29 m)
- Beam: 41 ft 8 in (12.70 m)
- Propulsion: Non-self-propelled
- Notes: Boom capacity 25 tons

USS Captain Dud (ID-3507), later USS YD-43, was a United States Navy floating derrick in service from 1918 to 1956.

Captain Dud was built in 1914 as the commercial wooden, pontoon-hull, steel A-frame floating derrick Captain Dud S507 by S. Flory at Bangor, Pennsylvania; her design included a copper-sheathed house. In 1918 the U.S. Navy acquired her from her owner, the Thames Towboat Company of New London, Connecticut, for use during World War I, assigned her the naval registry identification number 3507, and placed her in service as USS Captain Dud (ID-3507).

Captain Dud was assigned to the 5th Naval District. When the U.S. Navy adopted its modern hull number system on 17 July 1920, she was classified as a floating crane (YD), her name was dropped, and she became USS YD-43.

YD-43 was rebuilt in 1932 and remained in service until 1956.
