= Dudley Perkins =

Dudley Perkins may refer to:

- Dudley Perkins (soldier) (1915–1944), New Zealand soldier
- Dudley Gwynne Perkins (1911–1986), Welsh solicitor and writer on legal and consumer matters
- Dudley Perkins (motorcyclist) (1893–1978), American champion hillclimb competitor and Harley-Davidson motorcycle dealer
- Dudley Perkins (rapper), American rapper and singer from Oxnard, California
- F. Dudley Perkins (1875–1960), American football player and coach
