= Owen Francis Dudley =

English Catholic priest and novelist

Owen Francis Dudley (1882–1952) was an English Catholic priest who gained fame both as a world lecturer and as a novelist.

In 1911 he became an Anglican minister. He was received into the Catholic Church in 1915. He was ordained a Catholic priest in 1917 and became a chaplain in the British Army. He saw service on the French and Italian fronts during World War I and was wounded. After the war he was active in the Catholic Missionary Society (a society of Catholic priests) and was elected the Superior General of the Catholic Missionary Society of England in 1933.

His novels have been described as "thrillers (which) bear a superficial resemblance to Chesterton's Father Brown tales". They feature the adventures of "The Masterful Monk". They include "The Masterful Monk" in 1929, "Pageant of Life", in 1932, "The Coming of the Monster" in 1936, "The Tremaynes and the Masterful Monk" in 1940, "Michael" in 1948, and "Last crescendo" in 1954 (posthumously).

In addition he penned some nonfiction works, including "Will men be like gods? : humanitarianism or human happiness?" in 1932; "Human happiness and H.G. Wells" in 1936; "The Church Unconquerable" in 1936 "You and thousands like you" in 1949: " 'What I found' – An Ex-Anglican's conversion story." 1949.

The 1949 book The road to Damascus the spiritual pilgrimage of fifteen converts to Catholicism (OCLC 613083540) contains a chapter by Dudley titled "What I Found". The editor, John A. O'Brien provides the biographical information.

Dudley died in 1952.
