= Dudley B. Bridgforth Jr. =

American politician

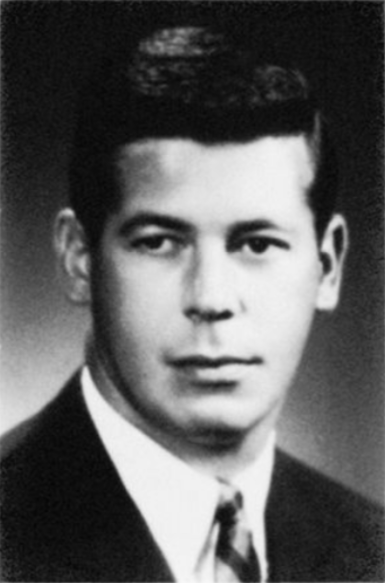

Member of the Mississippi House of Representatives
- In office 1968–1972

Personal details
- Born: December 14, 1940 (age 85) Memphis, Tennessee, U.S.
- Education: University of Mississippi

Dudley B. Bridgforth Jr. (born December 14, 1940) is an American politician. He served as a member of the Mississippi House of Representatives.

== Life and career ==
Bridgforth was born in Memphis, Tennessee. He attended the University of Mississippi.

Bridgforth served in the Mississippi House of Representatives from 1968 to 1972.
