= Dudley Carleton =

Dudley Carleton may refer to:

- Dudley Carleton, 1st Viscount Dorchester (1573–1632), English statesman and diplomat
- Dudley Carleton (diplomat) (1599–1654), nephew of the above, diplomat and Clerk of the Privy Council
- Dudley Carleton, 4th Baron Dorchester (1822–1897), British peer
- Dudley Carleton, 2nd Baron Dorchester (1876–1963), British peer
