= Angela Dudley =

South African laser scientist

Angela Louise Dudley is a South African laser scientist whose research involves beam shaping, optical modes, Bessel beams, and structured light, with applications including optical communication and additive manufacturing. She is a senior lecturer in physics at the University of the Witwatersrand.

== Education and career ==
Dudley chose to study physics because it had few women, giving her more opportunities. She has bachelor's, master's, and Ph.D. degrees from the University of KwaZulu-Natal, where she studied from 2002 to 2012. Her 2012 doctoral dissertation, Superpositions of light fields carrying orbital angular momentum, was supervised by Andrew Forbes.

She worked for the Council for Scientific and Industrial Research from 2008 to 2018, at the National Laser Centre in Pretoria, before taking her present position at the University of the Witwatersrand in 2019.

== Recognition ==
Dudley was one of two recipients of the 2015 Silver Jubilee Medal for early career achievement of the South African Institute of Physics. Optica named her as a 2024 Optica Fellow, "for foundational contributions to the all-digital control of structured light, and for outstanding service to the international optics community".
