= Dudley Park =

Dudley Park may refer to:

- Dudley Park, South Australia
- Dudley Park, Western Australia
- Dudley Conservation Park, South Australia
- Dudley Park, Rangiora, New Zealand
