= Paul Dudley (American football) =

American gridiron football player (1939–1987)

No. 23, 28, 25, 14
- Position: Halfback

Personal information
- Born: January 16, 1939; Fort Smith, Arkansas, U.S.
- Died: April 19, 1987 (aged 48); Las Vegas, Nevada, U.S.
- Listed height: 6 ft 0 in (1.83 m)
- Listed weight: 185 lb (84 kg)

Career information
- High school: Sallisaw (Sallisaw, Oklahoma)
- College: Arkansas
- NFL draft: 1961: 4th round, 54th overall pick
- AFL draft: 1962: 29th round, 232nd overall pick

Career history
- New York Giants (1962); Philadelphia Eagles (1963); Calgary Stampeders (1964–1965); Saskatchewan Roughriders (1966)

Awards and highlights
- Grey Cup champion (1966)

Career NFL statistics
- Rushing yards: 121
- Rushing average: 3.2
- Receptions: 10
- Receiving yards: 120
- Total touchdowns: 1
- Stats at Pro Football Reference

Paul Eugene Dudley (January 16, 1939 – March 20, 1987) was an American football defensive back and running back in the National Football League (NFL) for the New York Giants and the Philadelphia Eagles.

Dudley played college football at the University of Arkansas and was drafted in the fourth round of the 1961 NFL draft by the Green Bay Packers. Dudley was also selected in the 29th round of the 1962 AFL draft by the San Diego Chargers.

He never played a regular-season game for either of the teams that drafted him. The Packers released Dudley immediately before the 1962 season, as he failed to displace either of their established backs, Paul Hornung and Jim Taylor. He instead made his NFL debut with the New York Giants, where he played as a running back. After the 1962 season, he was traded to the Philadelphia Eagles but played sparingly in 1963 due to injuries. The Eagles released him at the start of the 1964 season.

He later played in the Canadian Football League (CFL). He spent part of the 1965 season on the roster of the Calgary Stampeders, and then was signed by the Saskatchewan Roughriders for the 1966 season, where he was one of the team's leaders in yards from scrimmage. He re-signed with the Roughriders for 1967 but was placed on injured reserve before the season began.
