= L. C. Cole =

American football player and coach (born 1956)

Current position
- Title: Assistant head coach & defensive coordinator
- Team: Clark Atlanta
- Conference: SIAC

Biographical details
- Born: January 3, 1956 (age 70); Springfield, Ohio, U.S.

Playing career
- 1975–1979: Nebraska
- 1980: New York Jets*
- 1981–1982: Austin Texans
- 1982: Boston Breakers
- Positions: Defensive end, outside linebacker, strong safety

Coaching career (HC unless noted)
- 1982 (spring): Southwest Texas State (GA)
- 1982: Nebraska (DE)
- 1983–1984: New Mexico State (OLB)
- 1985: Ball State (DE)
- 1986: Kansas State (DE)
- 1987: Kansas State (OLB)
- 1988–1989: Wisconsin (OLB)
- 1990: Toledo (RB)
- 1991–1992: Morgan State (DC)
- 1993: Eastern Michigan (ST/RB)
- 1994–1995: Cincinnati (AHC/RB)
- 1996–1999: Tennessee State
- 2000–2002: Alabama State
- 2004: Concordia–St. Paul (AHC/DC)
- 2005: Lane (DC)
- 2006–2007: Sidney Lanier HS (AL)
- 2008: Texas Southern (DC)
- 2009–2010: Stillman
- 2011: Concordia (AL) (DC)
- 2012–2013: Wilcox Central HS (AL)
- 2014: Central HS (AL) (DC)
- 2015–2016: Fairfield Prep (AL)
- 2018–2019: Loachapoka HS (AL)
- 2020–2021: Park Crossing HS (AL)
- 2022–2023: Allen (AHC/DC/ST)
- 2024–present: Clark Atlanta (AHC/DC)

Administrative career (AD unless noted)
- 2006–2007: Sidney Lanier HS (AL)

Head coaching record
- Overall: 41–48 (college; 14 wins vacated); 42–67 (high school)
- Tournaments: 0–2 (NCAA D-I-AA playoffs)

Accomplishments and honors

Championships
- 2 OVC (1998–1999)

Awards
- 2× OVC Coach of the Year (1998–1999)

Lawrence "L. C." Cole (born January 3, 1956) is an American college football coach and former player. He is the assistant head coach and defensive coordinator for Clark Atlanta University, positions he has held since 2024. He was the head football coach for Tennessee State University from 1996 to 1999, Alabama State University to 2000 to 2002, Sidney Lanier High School from 2006 to 2007, Stillman College from 2009 to 2010, Wilcox Central High School from 2012 to 2013, Fairfield High Preparatory School from 2015 to 2016, Loachapoka High School from 2018 to 2019, and Park Crossing High School from 2020 to 2021.

After a successful, but controversial, stint as head coach at Alabama State University, Cole revived the storied football program at Montgomery, Alabama's Sidney Lanier High School; during Cole's two years at Lanier, the Poets won the City Championship each year, and they never lost to a city opponent. Lanier reached the state playoffs each year, making it to the quarterfinals in 2006. On December 3, 2008, Cole was announced as Stillman College's third head coach since the reinstatement of the program in 1999 in replacing Greg Thompson. Following the 2010 season, Cole was fired as head coach, and replaced with Stillman alumnus Teddy Keaton.

== Playing career ==
Cole played high school football from Dunbar High School where he was also an All-American. From 1975 to 1979, he played college football for Nebraska under Tom Osborne as a defensive end. He was a team captain and an All-Pac-8 selection in his senior season.

In 1980, after going undrafted in the 1980 NFL draft, Cole signed with the New York Jets of the National Football League (NFL) as an outside linebacker and strong safety. Before the season Cole suffered a shoulder injury and was released.

In 1981, Cole signed with the Austin Texans, a minor league team in Texas that was a member of the American Football Association (AFA). Before signing with the Texans, the team has given up a league-worst 420.7 yards and 40.8 points per game. In his first game, he helped hold the San Antonio Charros to just 249 yards and just 25 yards on 26 carries.

In 1982, Cole signed with the Boston Breakers of the United States Football League (USFL).

== Coaching career ==
In 1982, Cole began his coaching career as a graduate assistant for Southwest Texas State. Before signing with the Boston Breakers in the fall of 1982, he served as a part-time defensive ends coach at his alma mater, Nebraska, under his head coach Tom Osborne. In 1983, he was hired as the outside linebackers coach for New Mexico State. He helped coach two future NFL draft picks: linebackers Fredd Young and Leo Barker. In 1985, he was hired by first-year head coach Paul Schudel at Ball State as his defensive ends coach. In 1986, Cole moved to Kansas State as the defensive ends coach under Stan Parrish. He transitioned to outside linebackers in 1987. In 1988, he accepted a similar position with Wisconsin. In 1990, he accepted his first position as an offensive coach as he was hired as the running backs coach for Toledo.

In 1991, Cole was among the final candidates for the head coaching position at Morgan State after the departure of Ed Wyche. Instead, the job went to Ricky Diggs. After returning to Toledo to coach running backs, Cole was approached by Diggs with the offer of becoming the defensive coordinator for Morgan State. Cole accepted his first coordinator position under Diggs. After the 1992 season, Diggs was under fire and 66 of the team's players signed a petition for his dismissal and Cole was frequently named as the preferred successor. Diggs was ultimately not removed from his post and he dismissed Cole entirely. In 1993, Cole was hired as the running backs coach and special teams coordinator for Eastern Michigan. In 1994, he joined Cincinnati as assistant head coach and running backs coach.

After two seasons with Cincinnati, Cole was hired as the head football coach for Tennessee State. He hired his brother, Johnnie, as his offensive coordinator. In his first season, he helped improve the team from a 2–9 record in 1995 to a 4–7 in 1996. During the 1997 season and into the 1998 season, Cole and his brother were both under investigation by the National Collegiate Athletic Association (NCAA) for violations. During the 1998 season, both of them were suspended for the team's homecoming game. Tennessee State self-imposed the suspension in hopes of reducing potential future sanctions by the NCAA. Despite the suspension, Cole and Tennessee State finished the season with a 9–3 record and a trip to the NCAA Division I-AA playoffs, their best season since 1986. In 1999, the details of the NCAA violations were released. The allegations were that either Cole brother provided transportation, tickets, and cash to a player alongside contacting players from other schools prior to receiving written permission from the schools. It was also revealed that Tennessee State had admitted two athletes who competed under false names along with every football player receiving monetary compensation for making it to the playoffs. Johnnie had been suspended from his duties since 1998, while L. C. remained as head coach, but was later alleged to have provided false and misleading information during the NCAA's investigation. Despite all the investigations and allegations, Cole helped lead Tennessee State to an unbeaten regular season and their second-straight Ohio Valley Conference (OVC) title. He resigned after the 1999 season amidst the turmoil. His career coaching record at Tennessee State was 28–18.

In 2000, Cole was hired as the head football coach for Alabama State. He joined a program that was in the process of attempting to move from the NCAA Division I-AA level to the NCAA Division I-A level. In his inaugural season, his team went 6–5, their best since 1995. In 2001, Alabama State finished 8–4 and earned a trip to the Southwestern Athletic Conference (SWAC) championship game. During the 2002 and 2003 seasons, Cole and the school he coached for came under fire by the NCAA and were once again investigated. Cole was placed on unpaid administrative leave prior to the 2003 season. He was officially fired in December 2003.

After not coaching in 2003 due to the investigation, Cole was hired as the assistant head coach and defensive coordinator for Concordia–St. Paul. In 2004, Cole rejoined his brother, this time as his assistant at Lane. While awaiting the NCAA's ruling, Cole took another head coaching job, this time, for Sidney Lanier High School. He also served as the school's athletic director. He inherited a team that finished 1–8 in 2005 with 36 players, and finished 7–5 in first season while growing the team to almost 60 players. One of Cole's assistant coaches, Craig Payne, was accused of exposing himself to two players, but no charges were filed. After initially being reported that Cole was fired after the season, the school ultimately renewed his contract. He finished his second season with a 3–7 record before rejoining his brother, who was now the head football coach for Texas Southern, as his defensive coordinator.

== Personal life ==
Cole and his wife, Mitzi, have one son together. His wife was born in Madison, Wisconsin. His son is from Nashville, Tennessee. His parents are Ruby Cole and Timothy Cole. He was the fourth of nine brothers; including Johnnie, who was the head football coach for Lane and Texas Southern.

== Head coaching record ==
=== College ===
Year	Team	Overall	Conference	Standing	Bowl/playoffs	Rank^{#}
Tennessee State Tigers (Ohio Valley Conference) (1996–1999)
1996	Tennessee State	4–7	3–5	T–6th		
1997	Tennessee State	4–7	4–3	T–4th		
1998	Tennessee State	9–3	6–1	1st	L NCAA Division I-AA First Round	12
1999	Tennessee State	11–1	7–0	1st	L NCAA Division I-AA First Round	11
Tennessee State:		28–18	20–9			
Alabama State Hornets (Southwestern Athletic Conference) (2000–2002)
2000	Alabama State	0–5 (6–5)	0–2 (5–2)	T–1st (Eastern)		
2001	Alabama State	0–4 (8–4)	0–1 (6–1)	1st (Eastern)		
2002	Alabama State	6–6	2–5	5th (Eastern)		
Alabama State:		6–15 (20–15)	2–8 (13–8)			
Stillman Tigers (Southern Intercollegiate Athletic Conference) (2009–2010)
2009	Stillman	4–7	2–7	9th		
2010	Stillman	3–8	2–7	T–8th		
Stillman:		7–15	4–14			
Total:		41–48 (55–48)				
National championship Conference title Conference division title or championship game berth
^{#}Rankings from final Sports Network poll.

=== High school ===
Year	Team	Overall	Conference	Standing	Bowl/playoffs
Sidney Lanier Poets () (2006–2007)
2006	Sidney Lanier	7–5	5–2	2nd	
2007	Sidney Lanier	3–7	3–4	4th	
Sidney Lanier:		10–12	8–6		
Wilcox Central Jaguars () (2012–2013)
2012	Wilcox Central	3–11	2–8	7th	
2013	Wilcox Central	3–7	2–5	6th	
Wilcox Central:		6–18	4–13		
Fairfield Prep Tigers () (2015–2016)
2015	Fairfield Prep	7–4	3–4	5th	
2016	Fairfield Prep	7–5	5–2	3rd	
Fairfield Prep:		14–9	8–6		
Loachapoka Indians () (2018–2019)
2018	Loachapoka	4–5	2–4	5th	
2019	Loachapoka	4–6	2–4	5th	
Loachapoka:		8–11	4–8		
Park Crossing Thunderbirds () (2020–2021)
2020	Park Crossing	4–7	2–4	5th	
2021	Park Crossing	0–10	0–7	8th	
Park Crossing:		4–17	2–11		
Total:		42–67			
