= Greg Thompson (American football) =

American football coach and college athletics administrator

Biographical details
- Born: November 25, 1950 (age 75)

Coaching career (HC unless noted)
- ?: Southern (assistant)
- ?: Morris Brown (OC)
- 1981–1994: Morris Brown
- 1996–2000: Clark Atlanta (OC)
- 2001–2002: Morris Brown (OC)
- 2004–2005: Stillman (OC)
- 2006–2008: Stillman

Administrative career (AD unless noted)
- 1982–1995: Morris Brown
- 2004–2005: Stillman (interim AD)
- 2007: Stillman (interim AD)

Head coaching record
- Overall: 70–92–4

Greg Thompson (born November 25, 1950) is an American former football coach and college athletics administrator. He served as head football coach at coach of the Morris Brown College in Atlanta, Georgia from 1981 to 1994 and Stillman College in Tuscaloosa, Alabama from 2006 to 2008, compiling career college football record of 70–92–4. Thompson was also the athletic director at Morris Brown from 1982 to 1995 and interim athletic director at Stillman from October 2004 to June 2005 and again from January through July 2007.

In November 1981, Thompson was named interim head coach for the final game of the season following the suspension of Lambert Reed for striking a player with an ax handle. Following the firing of Reed, Thompson was named the full-time head coach, and served in that capacity at Morris Brown from 1981 to 1995 and compiled an overall record of 50–89–4. After being fired from Morris Brown in December 1995, Thompson was hired as offensive coordinator at Clark Atlanta University (CAU) by Willie Hunter. At CAU, Thompson served as the offensive coordinator under Hunter through the 1998 season when he was moved to tight ends coach for the 1999 season. He was subsequently moved back to the offensive coordinator season midway through the 1999 season following the resignation of Elmer Mixon as head coach.

Thompson then returned to Morris Brown where he served as offensive coordinator from 2001 to 2002 under head coach Sol Brannan. Morris Brown subsequently fired Thompson in January 2003 in an effort to save money after the college lost its accreditation.

In 2004, Theophilus Danzy hired Thompson to serve as offensive coordinator at Stillman. In February 2006 he was named head coach after Danzy was resigned elsewhere in the athletic department. He was fired after the 2008 season and compiled an overall record of 16–16 during his tenure.

== Head coaching record ==
Year	Team	Overall	Conference	Standing	Bowl/playoffs
Morris Brown Wolverines (Southern Intercollegiate Athletic Conference) (1981–1994)
1981	Morris Brown	2–0	2–0		
1982	Morris Brown	7–4	5–2		
1983	Morris Brown	5–4–1	4–3		
1984	Morris Brown	5–4–1	5–1–1		
1985	Morris Brown	5–5			
1986	Morris Brown	2–7–1	1–5–1		
1987	Morris Brown	2–8–1	2–5		
1988	Morris Brown	6–4	5–2		
1989	Morris Brown	3–7	3–4		
1990	Morris Brown	4–6	4–3	T–4th	
1991	Morris Brown	4–6	2–5	7th	
1992	Morris Brown	4–6	2–5	8th	
1993	Morris Brown	4–6	3–4		
1994	Morris Brown	2–8	1–6		
Morris Brown:		55–75–4			
Stillman Tigers (Southern Intercollegiate Athletic Conference) (2006–2008)
2006	Stillman	5–5	4–3	T–4th	
2007	Stillman	7–4	3–4	T–5th	
2008	Stillman	3–8	2–7	T–8th	
Stillman:		15–17			
Total:		70–92–4			
