= George Weaver (educator) =

American physician and educator

George Augustus Weaver (November, 1871 - January 20, 1939) was a physician, surgeon, and educator. His contributions to the education of black students led to a library being named in his honor in Tuscaloosa.

George Weaver was born in 1872, the son of Lawrence and Lucy Elizabeth Weaver of Tuscaloosa, Alabama. Lawrence Weaver was a blacksmith, businessman and landowner as well as a trustee for the African Methodist Episcopal Zion Church of Tuscaloosa. He was the father of six children and sent all of them to college. George Augustus Weaver was his oldest child and graduated from Talladega College in 1892.

George Weaver was the principal of a school for black students in Gadsden, Alabama for one year and then attended Howard University. He graduated from Howard University with a medical degree in 1899 and interned at Johns Hopkins Hospital in Baltimore, Maryland.

Weaver returned to Tuscaloosa in 1900 and was a surgeon at Stillman Hospital, located on the campus of Stillman College. Dr. Weaver was most active in church, civic and fraternal affairs. His Fraternal affairs includes: Charter Member, 1st Worshipful Master, of Rescue Lodge #234, F & AM PHA in 1905, and Grand Senior Warden of the Most Worshipful Prince Hall Grand Lodge F & AM State of Alabama in 1906–07. He was a trustee and deacon of the First African Baptist Church. During this time he made his personal library available for black students to use in their studies.

In 1960 Mrs. Ruth Bolden, the first librarian for what is now the Weaver-Bolden Library Branch (part of the Tuscaloosa Public Library system), requested that the library be named for Dr. Weaver to honor his contributions to young people and his generosity with his own books to the students of the area.
