= Yolanda W. Page =

American academic administrator

8th president of Stillman College
- Incumbent
- Assumed office July 1, 2023
- Preceded by: Cynthia Warrick

Personal details
- Born: Yolanda Williams Shreveport, Louisiana, U.S.
- Children: 2
- Education: Dillard University; Louisiana State University

Yolanda Williams Page is an American academic administrator serving as the eighth president of Stillman College since July 2023. She was the provost of Savannah State University from 2022 to 2023.

== Education ==
Page is from Shreveport, Louisiana. Page earned a B.A. in English with a minor in business management from Dillard University in 1991. She was a member of the student government association and Alpha Kappa Alpha. She earned a M.A. and Ph.D. in American and African-American literature from Louisiana State University.

== Career ==
Page worked at English instructor at Dillard in 1994. She later served as its chair of the English department and assistant dean of humanities. She was the inaugural Title III and student success director at the University of Arkansas at Little Rock. Page worked at the University of Arkansas at Pine Bluff as the chair of the department of English, theatre and mass communications. In 2011, she was promoted to dean of the School of Arts and Sciences. She was promoted to full professor at Pine Bluff. In 2013, she returned to Dillard as the vice president in the division of academic affairs and professor of English at Dillard University. On September 6, 2022, she became the provost, vice president for academic affairs, and chief academic officer of Savannah State University.

On July 1, 2023, Page became the eighth president of Stillman College, succeeding Cynthia Warrick.

== Personal life ==
Page is married to academic administrator David D. Page. She has two children.
