= ESPNU College Football =

US television program

- Starring: (see below)
- Country of origin: United States

Production
- Running time: 210 minutes+

Original release
- Network: ESPNU
- Release: August 25, 2005 – present

ESPNU College Football is a broadcast of NCAA Division I Football Bowl Subdivision and NCAA Division I Football Championship Subdivision college football on ESPNU. ESPNU College Football debuted on August 25, 2005 with a HBCU match-up between Benedict and Morehouse.

In addition to their live game coverage, ESPNU also has three weekly programs devoted to college football, which include ESPNU Inside the Polls on Monday at 6 pm ET, ESPNU Coaches Spotlight on Tuesdays at 12 pm ET and ESPNU Recruiting Insider on Fridays at 7:30 pm ET.

== History ==
ESPNU launched its college football coverage on August 25, 2005 with a SIAC matchup between Benedict and Morehouse.

ESPNU College Football's debut season showcased 75 games from Division I-A conferences such as the ACC, Big East, Big Ten, Conference USA, the MAC, Mountain West, SEC, Sun Belt and the WAC.

Also included were Division I FCS and Division II conferences such as the Big Sky, MEAC, Ohio Valley, SIAC, Southern and the SWAC.

They also debuted their first college football studio show, ESPNU Inside the Polls.

ESPNU also aired coverage of special events such as the Steel City Classic and the Turkey Day Classic.

ESPNU launched its second season of college football coverage on August 26, 2006 with a matchup between Tuskegee at Stillman.

ESPNU College Football featured over 70 games from new conferences such as the Gateway and the Ivy League. ESPNU also lost the rights, in 2006, to broadcast teams from Conference USA, the Mountain West and the WAC.

Notable personalities joined ESPNU College Football, such as Clay Matvick, Brian Kinchen and Chris Martin.

In 2006, ESPNU began utilizing the 1st and Ten technology for select games.

They also debuted two new studio shows to go along with ESPNU Inside the Polls, in ESPNU Coaches Spotlight and ESPNU Recruiting Insider.

Along with the Steel City Classic, ESPNU also showcased new special events in the Detroit Football Classic, Battle of the Bay and the Walt Disney World Florida Classic.

== Controversies ==
=== Ohio State-Indiana ===
There was some controversy and criticism directed towards ESPN during the 2006 football season when the October 21, 2006 game between Indiana and Ohio State was broadcast exclusively on ESPNU, and was not available to be broadcast on local TV, even in the Columbus, Ohio and Bloomington, Indiana markets. Ohio State was undefeated and ranked #1 at the time. Most fans considered Indiana to be a weak opponent within the Big Ten Conference based on recent performance. However, on October 14, just one week before this game, the Indiana Hoosiers defeated Iowa (then #15-ranked) 31-28, in what many considered an impressive upset. Considering the fact that Ohio State was a national championship contender and Indiana was competitive against a major team, fans of both schools were upset that ESPN would not be allowing ABC regional coverage of the game. Many cable providers did not carry ESPNU at the time. Accordingly, there was the perception that the move was a marketing tactic by ESPN, attempting to get more people and cable providers to carry and subscribe to ESPNU.

=== Brian Kinchen ===
On October 31, 2006, ESPNU college football commentator Brian Kinchen was suspended from calling games for one week, because of a comment he made during an October 28 game broadcast of the Northern Illinois-Iowa game. Kinchen was explaining the need for receivers to make catches with their hands, because they are "tender" and can "caress" the ball. He then paused and said, "that's kind of gay, but hey."

"The comments were inappropriate, and we apologize for them," said ESPN's vice president of public relations Josh Krulewitz. "They were completely inappropriate and not at all a reflection of who I am or the way I perform my work," Kinchen said in a statement issued by ESPN. "I have learned from my mistake and look forward to continuing my broadcasting career."

== Broadcast rights ==
On February 14, 2005, ESPNU reached an extensive agreement with the Mid-Eastern Athletic Conference and the Southwestern Athletic Conference, two conferences that are predominantly part of the Historically Black Colleges and Universities. The seven-year agreement, which goes through 2012, gives ESPNU the exclusive cable rights to the MEAC and the SWAC football. The agreement allows ESPNU to televise a minimum of seven football games a season, primarily on Thursday nights. In addition, ESPNU will also have the rights to televise the SWAC Conference Championship through the remainder of the contract.

On March 15, 2005, ESPNU got the rights to televise three quarterfinal matches in the NCAA Division I Football Championship. As the rest of the games following that will air on either ESPN or ESPN2.

On June 21, 2006, ESPN Inc. also reached a wide-ranging agreement with the Big Ten Conference. The ten-year deal, which goes through 2016, allows ESPN Family of networks to broadcast up to 41 games a year, which a portion will be part of ESPNU's coverage of college football.

On August 29, 2006, ESPN Inc. reached a wide-ranging agreement with the Big East Conference. The six-year deal, which goes through the 2012 college football season, gives ESPNU the rights to broadcast at least five games per year, until the deal runs out. It also gives ESPNU the rights to produce a weekly program devoted to Big East sports.

=== Division I FBS ===
- American Athletic Conference: 2006–present
- Atlantic Coast Conference: 2005–present
- Big Ten Conference: 2006–2022
- Conference USA: 2005, 2020–present
- Mid-American Conference: 2005–2007, 2011–present
- Mountain West Conference: 2005, 2013–2019
- Pac-12 Conference: 2012–2023
- Southeastern Conference: 2005–present
- Sun Belt Conference: 2005–2007, 2020–present
- Western Athletic Conference: 2005

=== Division I FCS ===
- Big Sky Conference: 2005–2006
- Gateway Football Conference: 2006
- Ivy League: 2005–2006, 2018–present
- Mid-Eastern Athletic Conference: 2005–present
- Ohio Valley Conference: 2005–2006
- Southern Conference: 2005–2006
- Southwestern Athletic Conference: 2005–present

== See also ==
- ESPNU Coaches Spotlight
- ESPNU Inside the Polls
- ESPNU Recruiting Insider
