= Stillman Stadium =

Stadium in Tuscaloosa, Alabama

Coordinates: 33°11′47″N 87°35′12″W

- Interactive map of Stillman Stadium
- Location: Tuscaloosa, Alabama
- Capacity: 9,000

Construction
- Built: 1999
- Opened: 1999

Tenant
- Stillman College

Stillman Stadium is a stadium in Tuscaloosa, Alabama. It is primarily used for American football, and is the home field of Stillman Tigers football.
