= Paul Brewster =

Paul Brewster may refer to:

- Paul Brewster (Gaelic footballer) (born 1971), Northern Irish Gaelic footballer
- Paul Brewster (American football) (1935–2021), American football coach
