= Cynthia Warrick =

American academic administrator

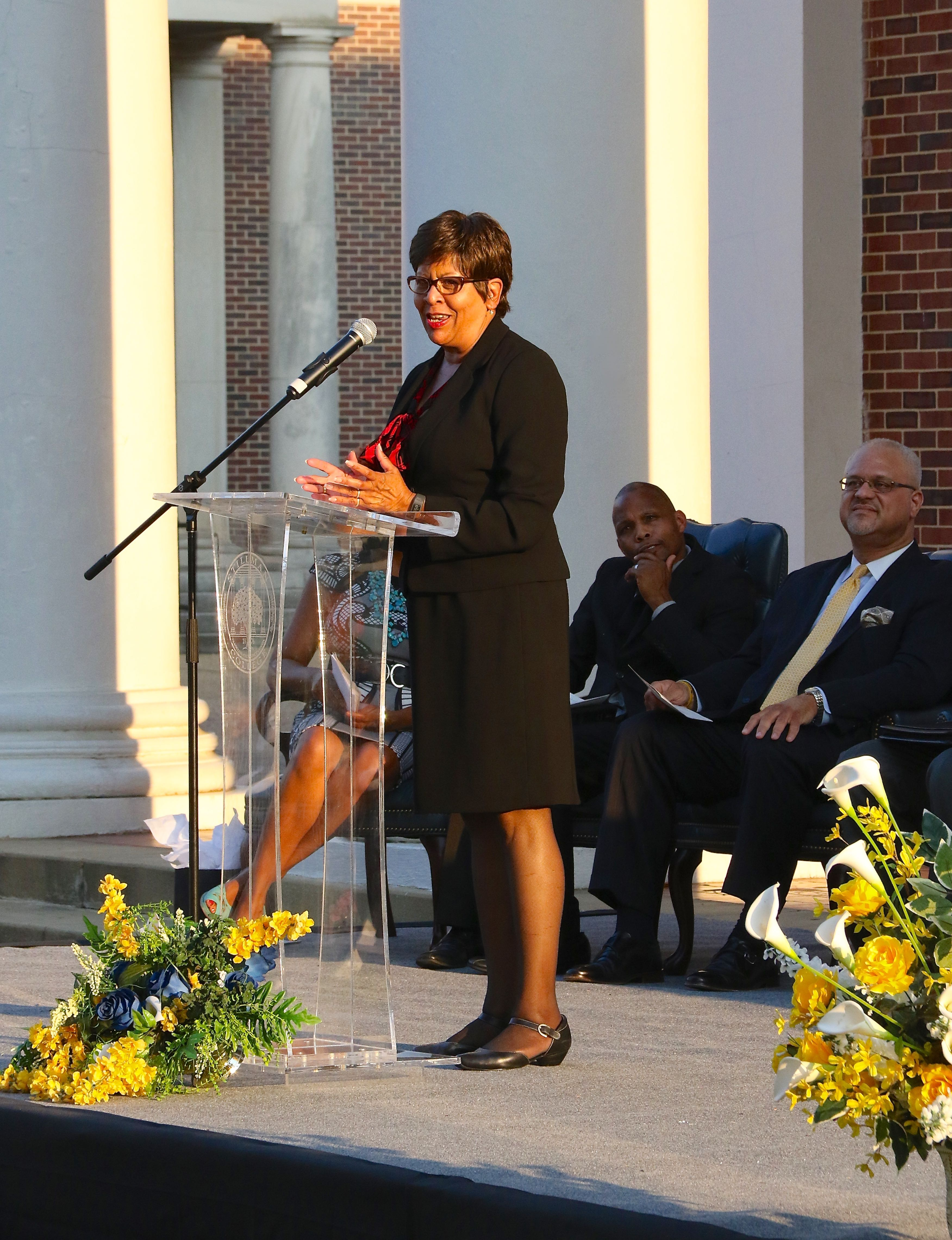
- Cynthia Warrick in 2017
- Born: Cynthia Warrick; San Antonio, Texas
- Education: George Mason University, Fairfax, VA; Georgia Institute of Technology, Atlanta, GA; Howard University, Washington, DC.
- Occupation: President of Stillman College
- Spouse: Jan Jasper

Cynthia Warrick is the seventh president of Stillman College, a liberal arts college in the West Tuscaloosa area of Tuscaloosa, Alabama. Before starting a career in higher education, she practiced as a licensed pharmacist. Warrick has two children, Alan Warrick II, a member of the San Antonio City Council, and Whitney Blair (Warrick) Craig, a federal and state lobbyist.

== Education and certifications ==
Warrick holds a Bachelor of Science (BS) in Pharmacy in 1975 from Howard University, Washington, D.C. and is a Registered Pharmacist in Texas and Indiana. She received a Master of Science (MS) in Public Policy in 1994 from the Georgia Institute of Technology, and a Doctor of Philosophy (PhD) degree in Environmental Science and Public Policy from George Mason University, Fairfax, Virginia, in 1999.

== Academic career ==
Warrick was assistant professor in the Division of Management, Policy and Community Health at the University of Texas School of Public Health, Center for Health, Promotion and Prevention Research in Houston, Texas, and then associate professor and Director of Environmental and Occupational Health at Florida A&M University in Tallahassee. After that, she served at Elizabeth City State University in North Carolina as tenured full professor of Pharmacy, Dean and Chief Research Officer.

Warrick was then appointed a Senior Fellow at the Howard University School of Pharmacy, Center for Minority Health Services Research.

She has also been elected county-wide to the board of trustees of the Alamo Colleges with a budget of $200 million, where she served as vice-chair of the Budget and Finance Committee and has helped pass an $85 million capital improvement bond.

== Higher Education Leadership ==
She was selected in 2012 as Interim President for South Carolina State University, a historically black university in Orangeburg, South Carolina. In 2014/15, she was appointed Interim President of Grambling State University in Grambling, Louisiana, where she brought stability to an institution that was in crisis. However, her management style generated controversy, leading to her decision not to seek the permanent presidency at Grambling. According to Quincy Hodges of The Times-Picayune, she "was able to streamline administrative operations; implemented aggressive student recruitment strategies and establish relationships with local, state, regional and national legislative and governmental representatives to support program and funding initiatives... raising more than $470,000 in donations." These achievements, notwithstanding, the University's Faculty Senate criticized her for "belittling faculty and staff;" for "failing to answer important and urgent questions;" and for taking "significant actions without consulting faculty members." In response, University of Louisiana System President Sandra Woodley issued a statement saying that "These are challenging times for Grambling and all of higher education," and added that " Warrick's leadership has been instrumental in putting the university on a path to success by making the tough decisions needed to affect positive change."

Warrick began her tenure as the Interim President of Stillman College in January 2017. Prior to being named to this position, she was a Senior Fellow at the Thurgood Marshall College Fund and also served as president of the Society for Diversity in the Biomedical Sciences, based in Houston, Texas.
