= List of Southern Intercollegiate Athletic Conference football standings =

This is a list of yearly Southern Intercollegiate Athletic Conference football standings.

== SIAC standings ==
2012 Southern Intercollegiate Athletic Conference football standings
	Conf.			Overall
Team	W		L	W		L
East
Fort Valley State xy^	6	–	1	8	–	4
Albany State	5	–	2	6	–	4
Morehouse	2	–	5	3	–	7
Clark Atlanta	1	–	6	2	–	8
Benedict	1	–	6	1	–	9
West
No. 23 Tuskegee # xy$	7	–	0	10	–	2
Miles ^	6	–	1	8	–	2
Stillman	4	–	3	6	–	5
Lane	3	–	4	5	–	5
Kentucky State	0	–	7	2	–	8
Championship: Tuskegee 55, Fort Valley State 24
$ – Conference champion; x – Division champion/co-champions; y – Championship game participant; ^ – NCAA Division II playoff participant; # – Pioneer Bowl participant; Rankings from AFCA Poll

2013 Southern Intercollegiate Athletic Conference football standings
	Conf.			Overall
Team	W		L	W		L
East
Albany State xy$	4	–	0	5	–	4
Fort Valley State	3	–	1	4	–	6
Benedict	2	–	2	4	–	6
Clark Atlanta	1	–	2	3	–	7
Morehouse	0	–	4	2	–	8
West
No. 25 Tuskegee x^	4	–	1	8	–	2
Miles xy	4	–	1	6	–	4
Lane	2	–	3	6	–	4
Stillman	2	–	3	6	–	5
Central State	2	–	3	2	–	8
Kentucky State	1	–	4	5	–	5
Championship: Albany State 17, Miles 14
$ – Conference champion; x – Division champion/co-champions; y – Championship game participant; ^ – NCAA Division II playoff participant; Rankings from AFCA Poll

2014 Southern Intercollegiate Athletic Conference football standings
	Conf.			Overall
Team	W		L	W		L
East
Albany State xy	7	–	0	7	–	3
Morehouse	4	–	3	6	–	4
Fort Valley State	4	–	3	6	–	4
Benedict	2	–	5	4	–	6
Clark Atlanta	1	–	6	3	–	7
Paine	1	–	6	2	–	8
West
Tuskegee xy$^	7	–	0	9	–	3
Miles	5	–	2	6	–	4
Stillman	4	–	3	5	–	5
Central State (OH)	3	–	4	4	–	6
Kentucky State	2	–	5	3	–	7
Lane	1	–	6	1	–	8
Championship: Tuskegee 47, Albany State 41
$ – Conference champion; x – Division champion/co-champions; y – Championship game participant; ^ – NCAA Division II playoff participant; Rankings from AFCA Poll

2015 Southern Intercollegiate Athletic Conference football standings
	Conf.			Overall
Team	W		L	W		L
East
Albany State xy	4	–	0	6	–	4
Fort Valley State	3	–	1	5	–	4
Morehouse	2	–	2	5	–	5
Clark Atlanta	1	–	3	1	–	8
Benedict	0	–	4	0	–	10
West
Miles xy$	5	–	0	7	–	5
No. 11 Tuskegee ^	4	–	1	10	–	3
Central State (OH)	2	–	3	5	–	5
Kentucky State	2	–	3	3	–	7
Stillman	1	–	4	3	–	6
Lane	1	–	4	3	–	7
Championship: Miles 20, Albany State 7
$ – Conference champion; x – Division champion/co-champions; y – Championship game participant; ^ – NCAA Division II playoff participant; Rankings from AFCA Poll

2016 Southern Intercollegiate Athletic Conference football standings
	Conf.			Overall
Team	W		L	W		L
East
Albany State x	3	–	1	5	–	4
Fort Valley State xy$	3	–	1	5	–	6
Benedict	2	–	2	5	–	5
Clark Atlanta	2	–	2	5	–	5
Morehouse	0	–	4	3	–	7
West
No. 20 Tuskegee x^	3	–	1	9	–	3
Kentucky State xy	3	–	1	4	–	7
Miles	2	–	2	5	–	5
Lane	1	–	3	5	–	5
Central State (OH)	1	–	3	1	–	9
Championship: Fort Valley State 33, Kentucky State 30 (2OT)
$ – Conference champion; x – Division champion/co-champions; y – Championship game participant; ^ – NCAA Division II playoff participant; Rankings from AFCA Poll
