= Haney Catchings =

American football coach (1949–2015)

Biographical details
- Born: January 15, 1949
- Died: April 19, 2015 (aged 66); Fayetteville, North Carolina, U.S.
- Education: Alcorn State University

Coaching career (HC unless noted)
- 1983–1985: Albany State (OC)
- 1986–1987: Prairie View A&M (OC)
- 1987–1989: Prairie View A&M
- 1990–1991: Tuskegee (OC)
- 1992: Alabama State (OC)
- 1993–1995: Tuskegee
- 1996–1998: Fayetteville State (OC)
- 1999: Scotland HS (NC) (assistant)
- 2000–2001: Seventy-First HS (NC)
- 2002–2006: E. E. Smith HS (NC) (assistant)
- 2007–2008: E. E. Smith HS (NC)

Head coaching record
- Overall: 19–41 (college)

Haney Catchings (January 15, 1949 – April 19, 2015) was an American football coach. He served as head coach at Prairie View A&M University from 1987 to 1989 and at Tuskegee University from 1993 to 1995, compiling a career college football record of 19–41.

== Coaching career ==
=== Prairie View A&M ===
Catchings was the 16th head football coach at Prairie View A&M University in Prairie View, Texas and held that position for three seasons, from 1987 until 1989. He initially served in an interim capacity for the final seven games of the 1987 season, taking over for Conway Hayman who was fired after a 0–3–1 start. His overall coaching record at Prairie View was 8–19. He only put together one team with an even record, when his 1988 team finished 5–5—the once-proud program's first non-losing season in 13 years. However, the school subsequently forfeited one win over Southern due to an ineligible player.

==== Academic accusations ====
Catchings was accused of pressuring his players to abandon their studies in favor of football. According to multiple players, Catchings "withheld textbooks and financial aid until players proved themselves on the field. For some players, it was the middle of the semester before Catchings thought them worthy of getting their books. As a result, 43 players on the 55-man roster had grade point averages below the NCAA minimum of 2.0. The players demanded that Catchings be fired. When the administration was slow to act, the players boycotted the program.

==== Program suspension ====
In May 1989, Prairie View shuttered its entire athletic program, except for track and field, due to massive financial problems. A month later, the Houston Chronicle reported that some $100,000 was missing from the athletic department's account. Eventually, Catchings was charged with filing fraudulent expense reports. In 1991, he pleaded guilty to felony and misdemeanor charges related to the scam. He was sentenced to five years' probation and ordered to pay over $1,500 in fines and restitution.

The fallout from the fraud would hobble Prairie View for several years to come. Ahead of the team's planned return to the gridiron in 1991, school officials sent a letter to 30,000 alumni asking for donations. However, only 150 people responded--not nearly enough to fund scholarships for the football team. Prairie View would go on to lose 80 consecutive games from 1989 to 1998, dating back to the final two losses of Catchings' last season--the longest losing streak in NCAA history. Even after breaking the losing streak in 1998, Prairie View would only win a total of 23 games over the next nine years until going 7-3 in 2007--the school's first "official" non-losing season since 1976.

=== Tuskegee ===
Catchings later became the head football coach at Tuskegee University in Tuskegee, Alabama. He was the 14th head coach for the Golden Tigers and held that position for three seasons, from 1993 until 1995. His coaching record at Tuskegee was 11–22. Catchings died of cancer in 2015, aged 66.

== Head coaching record ==
| Year | Team | Overall | Conference | Standing | Bowl/playoffs |
|---|---|---|---|---|---|
Prairie View A&M Panthers (Southwestern Athletic Conference) (1987–1989)
| 1987 | Prairie View A&M (Note: Conway Hayman was fired after a 0–3–1 start and replaced on an interim basis by Catchings who coached the last seven games.) | 3–4 | 1–3 | | |
| 1988 | Prairie View A&M | 4–6 (5–5) (Note: Prairie View A&M finished with a record of 5–5 (3–4 in SWAC) on the field but later had to forfeit its 20–14 win over Southern due to an ineligible player.) | 2–5 (3–4) | | |
| 1989 | Prairie View A&M | 1–9 | 1–6 | 7th | |
| Prairie View A&M: | | 8–19 (9–18) | 4–14 (5–13) | | |
Tuskegee Golden Tigers (Southern Intercollegiate Athletic Conference) (1993–1995)
| 1993 | Tuskegee | 3–8 | 3–5 | 7th | |
| 1994 | Tuskegee | 6–5 | 6–2 | 2nd | |
| 1995 | Tuskegee | 2–9 | 2–6 | 8th | |
| Tuskegee: | | 11–22 | 11–13 | | |
| Total: | | 19–41 (20–40) | | | |
