= 1988 Tennessee State Tigers football team =

American college football season

1988 Tennessee State Tigers football
- Conference: Ohio Valley Conference
- Record: 3–7–1 (2–4 OVC)
- Head coach: William A. Thomas (5th season)
- Home stadium: Hale Stadium; Vanderbilt Stadium

1988 Ohio Valley Conference football standings
	Conf.					Overall
Team	W		L		T	W		L		T
No. 7 Eastern Kentucky $^	6	–	0	–	0	11	–	3	–	0
No. 17 Middle Tennessee	4	–	2	–	0	7	–	4	–	0
Murray State	4	–	2	–	0	4	–	6	–	0
Tennessee State	2	–	4	–	0	3	–	7	–	1
Austin Peay	2	–	4	–	0	3	–	8	–	0
Morehead State	2	–	4	–	0	3	–	8	–	0
Tennessee Tech	1	–	5	–	0	1	–	10	–	0
$ – Conference champion; ^ – NCAA Division I-AA playoff participant; Rankings from NCAA Division I-AA Football Committee poll

The 1988 Tennessee State Tigers football team represented Tennessee State University as a member of the Ohio Valley Conference (OVC) during the 1988 NCAA Division I-AA football season. Led by fifth-year head coach William A. Thomas, the Tigers compiled an overall record of 3–7–1, with a conference record of 2–4, and finished tied for fourth in the OVC.

== Schedule ==
Date	Opponent	Site	Result	Attendance	Source
September 3	No. 15 Middle Tennessee	Vanderbilt Stadium; Nashville, TN	L 7–14	18,764	
September 10	No. 11 Jackson State*	Hale Stadium; Nashville, TN	T 26–26	18,954	
September 17	vs. Mississippi Valley State*	Liberty Bowl Memorial Stadium; Memphis, TN	W 13–6		
September 24	Florida A&M*	Hale Stadium; Nashville, TN	L 6–23	17,434	
October 1	at No. 20 Eastern Kentucky	Hanger Field; Richmond, KY	L 0–10	12,700	
October 8	at Grambling State*	Eddie G. Robinson Memorial Stadium; Grambling, LA	L 33–35		
October 15	at Murray State	Roy Stewart Stadium; Murray, KY	L 7–22	3,850	
October 22	at Morehead State	Jayne Stadium; Morehead, KY	W 29–14		
October 29	Tennessee Tech	Hale Stadium; Nashville, TN	W 27–23	5,346	
November 5	at Austin Peay	Municipal Stadium; Clarksville, TN	L 12–16	6,217	
November 12	Southern*	Vanderbilt Stadium; Nashville, TN	L 7–10	14,538	
*Non-conference game; Rankings from NCAA Division I-AA Football Committee Poll released prior to the game
