= Willie Williams (general) =

Retired USMC general, former DMCS

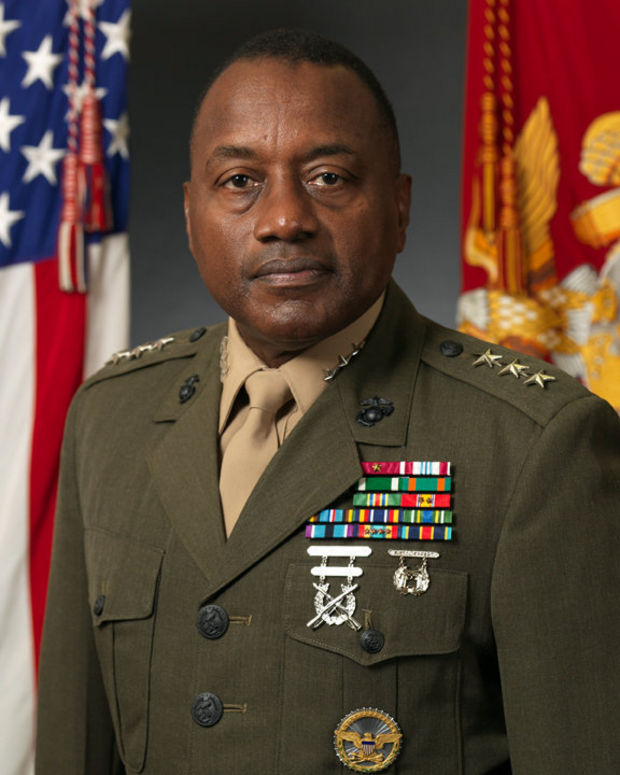
- Official U.S. Marine Corps portrait of LtGen Willie J. Williams
- Born: December 17, 1951 (age 74); Livingston, Alabama, US
- Alma mater: Stillman College
- Military career
- Allegiance: United States
- Branch: United States Marine Corps
- Service years: 1974–2013
- Rank: Lieutenant general
- Commands: 3rd Force Service Support Group; Marine Corps Base Camp Smedley D. Butler
- Awards: Distinguished Service Medal; Legion of Merit (2)
- Education: BBA, Stillman College; MBA, National University; MS, National Defense University; Doctorate of Law, Stillman College; Honorary PhD, Albany State

Lieutenant General Willie J. Williams (born December 17, 1951) is a retired United States Marine Corps officer, recognized as one of the first African Americans to achieve the rank of three-star general. With nearly 40 years of distinguished service, Williams held several key leadership roles, including serving as the Director of the Marine Corps Staff from 2009 to 2013. His leadership and contributions to the Marine Corps and beyond have been instrumental in shaping military and educational initiatives. Additionally, he remains a significant figure in the advocacy for leadership, diversity, and educational equity through the Lt. Gen. Willie J. Williams Institute at Stillman College.

== Early life and education ==
Willie J. Williams was born in Livingston, Alabama, on December 17, 1951. He grew up in Moundville, Alabama, during the 1960s. As a child, Williams took on various jobs, including working as a janitor and cutting grass, to contribute to his family’s finances. Williams originally planned to enlist in the United States Air Force after high school; however, his teachers, recognizing his abilities and potential, encouraged him to pursue a college degree.

Williams attended Stillman College, a historically black college (HBCU) in Tuscaloosa, Alabama, where he earned a Bachelor of Arts degree in Business Administration. He later pursued advanced education, obtaining a Master of Arts in Business Administration in 1993 from National University in San Diego and a Master of Science in Strategic Resources Management from the Industrial College of the Armed Forces in 1994. Additionally, he holds honorary Doctorates of Law from Stillman College and Philosophy from Albany State University (ASU). His honor from ASU was given in recognition of his contribution to the establishment of ASU's undergraduate degree program in logistics and supply chain management.

== Military career ==
Commissioned as a second lieutenant in May 1974 after his graduation from Stillman College, Williams embarked on a distinguished career in the U.S. Marine Corps. Over the course of his 40-year career, he served in numerous roles, making significant contributions to military logistics, operations, and leadership.

=== Early assignments and leadership roles ===
Williams's military career began with the 11th Marine Artillery Regiment in 1975, where he initially served as a Battalion Supply Officer and then as the Regimental Supply Officer/Assistant S4 Officer. In October 1977, he was assigned to the 3rd Force Service Support Group in Iwakuni, Japan, as the Officer-in-Charge, Inventory Control Point. His career path continued with a series of assignments at Marine Barracks North Island, San Diego, and Marine Barracks in San Diego, where he served in various leadership roles, including Ship’s Detachment Supply Officer, Pacific Ocean Area/Marine Barracks Supply Officer, and Barracks Executive Officer.

In June 1982, Williams was assigned to Officer Candidate School at Quantico, Virginia, as a Platoon Commander and later attended the Amphibious Warfare School. By May 1983, Williams had become the Supply Officer at the Mountain Warfare Training Center, Bridgeport, California. From 1985 to 1989, he served as the Assistant Division Supply Officer, 3rd Marine Division in Okinawa, Japan, where he also deployed to the Persian Gulf as the Logistics Officer for the Contingency Marine Air Ground Task Force 3-88.

=== Joint duty and command assignments ===
Williams's career advanced as he took on joint duties with the Department of Defense Office of Inspector General's Office in January 1990. In 1993–94, he attended the Industrial College of the Armed Forces, where he subsequently assumed command of the 31st Marine Expeditionary Unit (Special Operations Capable) Service Support Group from 1994 to 1996. In 1997, he was assigned to the 3rd Force Service Support Group in Okinawa, Japan, where he served as Assistant Chief of Staff, G4, and later became the Commanding Officer of the Brigade Service Support Group 1.

In July 2000, Williams returned to Okinawa as the Commanding General of Marine Corps Base Camp Smedley D. Butler and, later, as the Commanding General of the 3rd Force Service Support Group. From 2003 to 2005, Williams served as the Assistant Deputy Commandant for Installations and Logistics at Headquarters Marine Corps (HQMC). His final military assignment was as the Director of the Marine Corps Staff, a position he held from July 2009 until his retirement in July 2013. In this role, Williams was the top adviser to two Marine Corps Commandants, making him one of the few African-American Marines to achieve the rank of three-star general.

=== Awards and decorations ===
Lt. Gen. Williams's personal awards and decorations include:

- Distinguished Service Medal
- Legion of Merit, with gold star in lieu of a second award
- Defense Meritorious Service Medal
- Navy and Marine Corps Commendation Medal
- Navy and Marine Corps Achievement Medal
- Armed Forces Expeditionary Medal
- Humanitarian Service Medal
- National Defense Service Medal
- Department of Defense Service Badge

== Post-military career ==
After his retirement from the Marine Corps in July 2013, Lt. Gen. Williams returned to Alabama, where he remained active in various community and leadership initiatives. He is the namesake of the Lt. Gen. Willie J. Williams Institute for Leadership, Education Equity, and Race Relations at Stillman College. The Institute focuses on "leadership development, educational equity, anti-racism, and cultural understanding, aiming to "awaken a new generation of global leaders". It includes a "Troops to Teachers" program to get military veterans into the classroom as certified teachers.

Williams has also been active in community service, mentoring youth and serving on boards. He has been a strong advocate for programs such as the Students Taking Renewed Interest in the Value of Education (STRIVE) mentoring program, which pairs students with adult mentors to encourage educational success. In addition to these efforts, Williams is also serve as the president of the Huntsville Rotary Club.

=== Hollywood connection ===
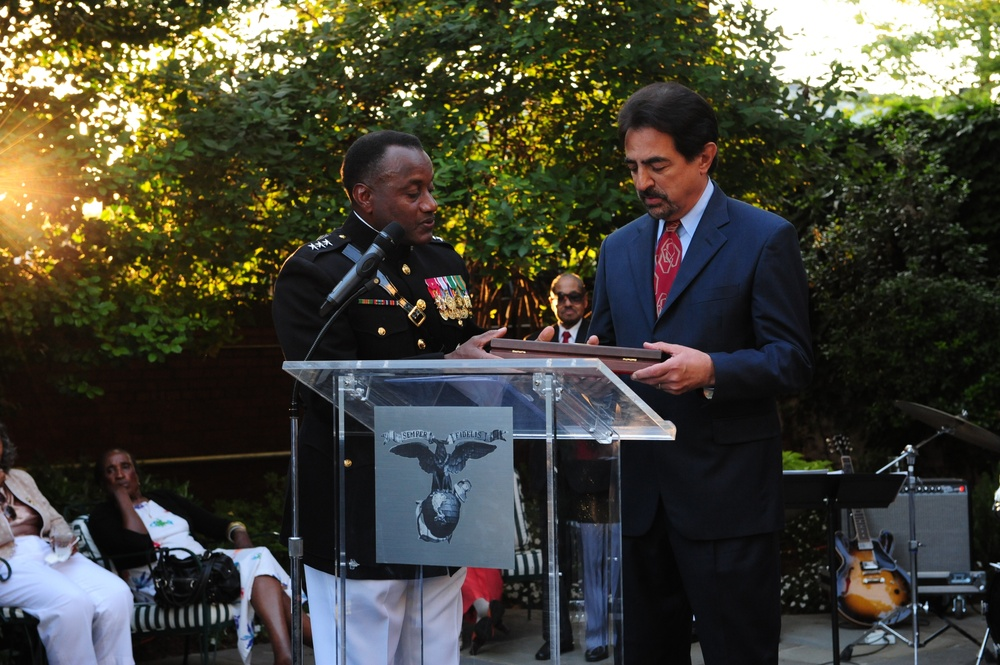
U.S. Marine Lt. Gen. Willie J. Williams, director of Marine Corps staff presents a gift to the guest of honor, actor Joe Mantegna during the parade reception at Marine Barracks Washington, D.C., June 3, 2011.

In 2010, Williams met actor Joe Mantegna at an evening dress parade at Marine Barracks, Washington, D.C. Later, when Mantegna was to receive his star on the Hollywood Walk of Fame, Williams volunteered to represent the Marine Corps at the ceremony. Later, Williams appeared in two episodes of the television series Criminal Minds in which Mantegna portrays FBI agent David Rossi.
