= 1988 Jackson State Tigers football team =

American college football season

1988 Jackson State Tigers football

SWAC champion

NCAA Division I-AA First Round, L 0–24 vs. Stephen F. Austin
- Conference: Southwestern Athletic Conference

Ranking
- Coaches: No. 5
- Record: 8–1–2 (7–0 SWAC)
- Head coach: W. C. Gorden (13th season)
- Home stadium: Mississippi Veterans Memorial Stadium

1988 Southwestern Athletic Conference football standings
	Conf.					Overall
Team	W		L		T	W		L		T
No. 5 Jackson State $^	7	–	0	–	0	8	–	1	–	2
No. 20 Grambling State	5	–	2	–	0	8	–	3	–	0
Alabama State	4	–	3	–	0	7	–	3	–	0
Alcorn State	4	–	3	–	0	6	–	4	–	0
Southern	4	–	3	–	0	6	–	5	–	0
Prairie View A&M	3	–	4	–	0	5	–	5	–	0
Mississippi Valley State	1	–	6	–	0	3	–	8	–	0
Texas Southern	0	–	7	–	0	0	–	11	–	0
$ – Conference champion; ^ – NCAA Division I-AA playoff participant; Rankings from NCAA Division I-AA Football Committee poll

The 1988 Jackson State Tigers football team represented Jackson State University as a member of the Southwestern Athletic Conference (SWAC) during the 1988 NCAA Division I-AA football season. Led by 13th-year head coach W. C. Gorden, the Tigers compiled an overall record of 8–1–2 and a mark of 7–0 in conference play, and finished as SWAC champion. Jackson State finished their season with a loss against Stephen F. Austin in the Division I-AA playoffs.

== Schedule ==
Date	Opponent	Rank	Site	Result	Attendance	Source
September 10	at Tennessee State*	No. 11	Hale Stadium; Nashville, TN (rivalry)	T 26–26	18,954	
September 17	Prairie View A&M		Mississippi Veterans Memorial Stadium; Jackson, MS	W 33–7	18,005	
September 24	Mississippi Valley State		Mississippi Veterans Memorial Stadium; Jackson, MS	W 35–14		
October 1	vs. Florida A&M*	No. 18	Hoosier Dome; Indianapolis, IN (Circle City Classic)	T 10–10	47,259	
October 8	at Alabama State		Cramton Bowl; Montgomery, AL	W 21–7	15,000	
October 15	at Southern	No. 17	A. W. Mumford Stadium; Baton Rouge, LA (rivalry)	W 23–3		
October 22	at No. 19 Grambling State	No. 17	Eddie G. Robinson Memorial Stadium; Grambling, LA	W 24–17	13,107	
November 5	Texas Southern	No. 13	Mississippi Veterans Memorial Stadium; Jackson, MS	W 26–0		
November 12	No. 7 Northwestern State*	No. 10	Mississippi Veterans Memorial Stadium; Jackson, MS	W 21–16	10,500	
November 19	Alcorn State	No. 6	Mississippi Veterans Memorial Stadium; Jackson, MS (rivalry)	W 7–0	23,404	
November 26	at No. 9 Stephen F. Austin*	No. 5	Homer Bryce Stadium; Nacogdoches, TX (NCAA Division I-AA First Round)	L 0–24		
*Non-conference game; Rankings from NCAA Division I-AA Football Committee Poll released prior to the game
