= 1988 Tennessee Tech Golden Eagles football team =

American college football season

1988 Tennessee Tech Golden Eagles football
- Conference: Ohio Valley Conference
- Record: 1–10 (1–5 OVC)
- Head coach: Jim Ragland (3rd season)
- Home stadium: Tucker Stadium

1988 Ohio Valley Conference football standings
	Conf.					Overall
Team	W		L		T	W		L		T
No. 7 Eastern Kentucky $^	6	–	0	–	0	11	–	3	–	0
No. 17 Middle Tennessee	4	–	2	–	0	7	–	4	–	0
Murray State	4	–	2	–	0	4	–	6	–	0
Tennessee State	2	–	4	–	0	3	–	7	–	1
Austin Peay	2	–	4	–	0	3	–	8	–	0
Morehead State	2	–	4	–	0	3	–	8	–	0
Tennessee Tech	1	–	5	–	0	1	–	10	–	0
$ – Conference champion; ^ – NCAA Division I-AA playoff participant; Rankings from NCAA Division I-AA Football Committee poll

The 1988 Tennessee Tech Golden Eagles football team represented Tennessee Technological University (commonly referred to as Tennessee Tech) as a member of the Ohio Valley Conference (OVC) during the 1988 NCAA Division I-AA football season. Led by third-year head coach Jim Ragland, the Golden Eagles compiled an overall record of 1–10, with a mark of 1–5 in conference play, and finished seventh in the OVC.

== Schedule ==
Date	Opponent	Site	Result	Attendance	Source
September 3	at East Carolina*	Ficklen Memorial Stadium; Greenville, NC	L 13–52	29,702	
September 10	at Liberty*	City Stadium; Lynchburg, VA	L 20–24	7,240	
September 17	Samford*	Tucker Stadium; Cookeville, TN	L 9–19		
September 24	Chattanooga*	Tucker Stadium; Cookeville, TN	L 0–41	2,989	
October 1	at Murray State	Roy Stewart Stadium; Murray, KY	W 16–13		
October 15	at No. T–16 Eastern Kentucky	Hanger Field; Richmond, KY	L 7–14		
October 22	No. 5 Western Kentucky*	Tucker Stadium; Cookeville, TN	L 17–20	9,242	
October 29	at Tennessee State	Hale Stadium; Nashville, TN	L 23–27	5,346	
November 5	Morehead State	Tucker Stadium; Cookeville, TN	L 3–20		
November 12	Austin Peay	Tucker Stadium; Cookeville, TN	L 6–10	500	
November 19	at Middle Tennessee	Johnny "Red" Floyd Stadium; Murfreesboro, TN	L 0–51		
*Non-conference game; Rankings from NCAA Division I-AA Football Committee Poll released prior to the game
