= Stillman Tigers football =

- First season: 1999
- Last season: 2015
- Location: Tuscaloosa, Alabama
- Stadium: Stillman Stadium (capacity: 9,000)
- Conference: SIAC
- Colors: Navy blue and Vegas gold
- All-time record: 90–84 (.517)
- Rivalries: Miles Golden Bears West Alabama
- Mascot: Tigers
- Marching band: Blue Pride Marching Band

The Stillman Tigers football team represented Stillman College in the NCAA Division II, competing as part of the Southern Intercollegiate Athletic Conference until 2015. Stillman played its home games at the 9,000 seat Stillman Stadium, which is located on-campus in Tuscaloosa, Alabama. Although only fielding a team since the 1999 season, Stillman previously fielded a team that was disbanded following the 1950 season. The program was discontinued after their 2015 season when the school eliminated all athletic teams, except for men's and women's basketball, due to increased costs associated with the athletic program.

== History ==
Stillman originally fielded a football squad for the 1922 season, and would compete on and off through its abandonment following the 1950 season. By 1999, the football program was revived and on September 4, 1999, the Tigers were defeated by Arkansas-Monticello 30–7 in the first Stillman game since 1950. Competing as a Division III Independent though the 2003 season, Stillman would revive its rivalry game with Miles College in 2001 as the Steel City Classic. The Tigers would enter the 2003 season as a Division II Independent, and compete as an Independent through the 2005 season when Stillman was admitted to the Southern Intercollegiate Athletic Conference in football. Stillman College football discontinued after the fall season of 2015.

Following the 2008 season, Greg Thompson was fired as head coach, and on December 3, 2008, L. C. Cole was announced as the program's third head coach since the reinstatement of the program in 1999. In the 2009 NFL draft, the Detroit Lions drafted defensive tackle Sammie Hill, the first player from Stillman to be drafted. He is also the second to play in the NFL from Stillman after Brian Witherspoon was signed by the Jacksonville Jaguars as an undrafted free agent in 2008. Following the 2010 season, Cole was fired as head coach, and on December 3, 2010, Stillman alumnus Teddy Keaton was announced as the program's fourth and last head coach since the reinstatement of the program in 1999. The program was discontinued after they completed their 2015 season.

On August 14, 2026, Stillman announced that the football program would return. Details are pending as to exactly when the program will return.

== Seasons ==
Year	Team	Overall	Conference	Standing	Bowl/playoffs	Coaches^{#}	AP^{°}
Stillman Tigers (Division III Independent) (1999–2003)
1999	Theophilus Danzy	3–6	Independent				
2000	Theophilus Danzy	6–3	Independent				
2001	Theophilus Danzy	6–3	Independent				
2002	Theophilus Danzy	8–2	Independent				
2003	Theophilus Danzy	5–5	Independent				
Stillman Tigers (Division II Independent) (2004)
2004	Theophilus Danzy	5–5	Independent				
Stillman Tigers (Southern Intercollegiate Athletic Conference) (2005–2015)
2005	Theophilus Danzy	6–4	SIAC	4th			
2006	Greg Thompson	6–4	SIAC	T–4th			
2007	Greg Thompson	7–4	SIAC	T–5th			
2008	Greg Thompson	3–8	SIAC	8th			
2009	L. C. Cole	4–7	SIAC	9th			
2010	L. C. Cole	3–8	SIAC	9th			
2011	Teddy Keaton	7–4	SIAC	T–1st (West)			
2012	Teddy Keaton	6–5	SIAC	3rd (West)			
2013	Teddy Keaton	6–5	SIAC	T–2nd (West)			
2014	Teddy Keaton	6–5	SIAC	3rd (West)			
2015	Teddy Keaton	3–6	SIAC	T–4th (West)			
Total:		90–84					
National championship Conference title Conference division title or championship game berth

== Head coaches ==
Tenure	Coach	Years	Record	Pct.
1999–2005	Theophilus Danzy	7	39–28	.582
2006–2008	Greg Thompson	3	16–16	.500
2009–2010	L. C. Cole	2	7–15	.318
2010–2015	Teddy Keaton	5	27–26	.509
Totals	4 coaches	18	90–84	.517
