= Tuscaloosa Public Library =

Public library in Tuscaloosa, Alabama

Coordinates: 33.21561°N 87.56194°W

The Tuscaloosa Public Library is a city/county agency in the city of Tuscaloosa, serving a population of over 184,035 in Tuscaloosa County in the state of Alabama, United States. The library has 58,037 registered patrons that use the library on a regular basis. There are currently over 225,000 items (books, DVDs, CDs, etc.) cataloged in the system. The library has three service outlets: the Main Library, the Brown Branch and the Weaver-Bolden Branch.

== History ==
=== Main library ===
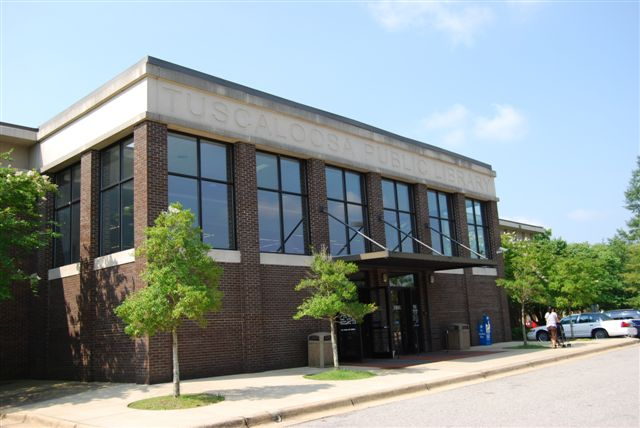
Tuscaloosa Public Library, front view

An 1879 article in The Tuscaloosa Times marks the foundation of a library for Tuscaloosa. J.H. Fitts, Esq., endowed it with a subscription of $50.00 in cash and 100 valuable books. A large number of books belonging to the Young Men's Christian Association were turned over to the library and about 500 books were given by citizens. A "commodious room" housed the library, located over the store formerly occupied by Dr. John Little.

By the early 1900s the library had been moved to a small one-room location in the basement of the County Courthouse. The library soon outgrew the Courthouse rooms and moved to what is now known as the "Old Searcy Home" (at 9th Street and 24th Avenue) in 1926. The library shared space with the County Board of Education. Five of the downstairs rooms were dedicated to the library. The monthly appropriation for the library in 1946 was the "pitifully low sum" of $185.00. This stipend was only a slight increase from the 1921 figure of $100.00 per month.

The 1952-53 report noted a growth in circulation to 47,335 for adults. The report also notes 29,749 books in the collection with an additional 4,373 items to be added in that year.

The main library soon outgrew the five room space in the Searcy House and was relocated to the historic Jemison House in 1958. The house, an Italianate villa, was built in 1860-1862 and it is listed on the National Register of Historic Places. The building was donated by the Friedman family and the library then became known as the Friedman Library. By 1966, the book stock numbered some 59,853 volumes.

Still the library would outgrow even the Friedman building. Bessie Sasser, then librarian, launched an effort for a new public library building. Located on Jack Warner Parkway (then River Road), the Tuscaloosa Public Library was realized in 1979 after lengthy construction problems and delays. It continues to serve as the main library today.

The library underwent an extensive renovation in 1999–2001, increasing space and modernizing the structure. Under the leadership of library director Nancy Pack, a new branch was added, the Brown Branch and a new home for the Weaver-Bolden Branch library was built in the McKenzie Courts.

=== Weaver-Bolden branch library ===
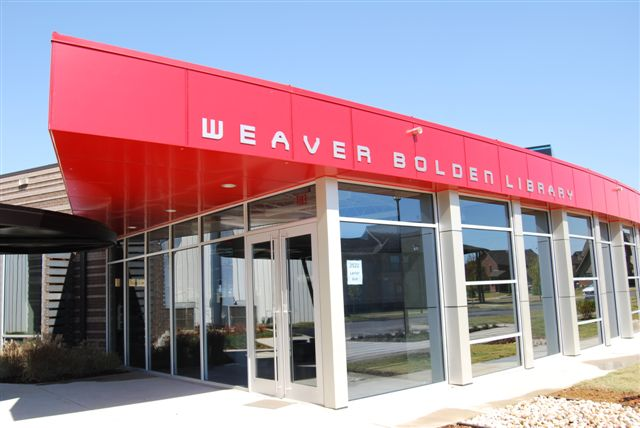
New Weaver Bolden Library

The first branch library, Weaver-Bolden, was established in 1948 under the leadership of Ruth Eaton Cummings Bolden who served as librarian there from its beginning to her retirement in 1975. In 1946, a library opened in three rooms of the community Center, located at 18th Street and 30th Avenue in Tuscaloosa, Alabama. The Community Center, site of recreational activities and a radio school, was funded through what was then known as the Community Chest (precursor to the United Way) and the Tuscaloosa Religious Association.

Twice a month, the library carried books to county schools in Holly Springs, Coaling, Romulus, Taylorville, Dry Creek and Holt. There was no other library service to African Americans in Tuscaloosa County except at the Northport Technical School.

Tuscaloosa County assumed financial responsibility for operating all recreational programs and the Community Center building was torn down. The library was moved first to the Lutheran Church School, then to a store owned by Mr. Frank Williams. The county appropriated no funds to the library until 1953, when the Tuscaloosa Public Library assumed responsibility for the library on 18th Street.

Ruth Bolden, the first librarian at the branch, requested that the library board name the library in honor of George Weaver, a former civic leader who opened his personal library to area students. In 1960, the present building at 2937 19th Street was constructed and dedicated on February 12, 1961, as the Weaver Branch. In 1990, Ms. Ruth Bolden's name was added, making it the Weaver-Bolden Branch Library. A Community Block Grant funded renovations in 1991 and 2003.

On November 16, 2010, thanks to a Hope VI grant, Weaver-Bolden was relocated from its original location to a brand new building at 2522 Lanier Avenue. The new location gave additional space for both patron and staff use. As a way to connect with its past, the sign from the original location was brought to the new location.

=== Brown branch library ===
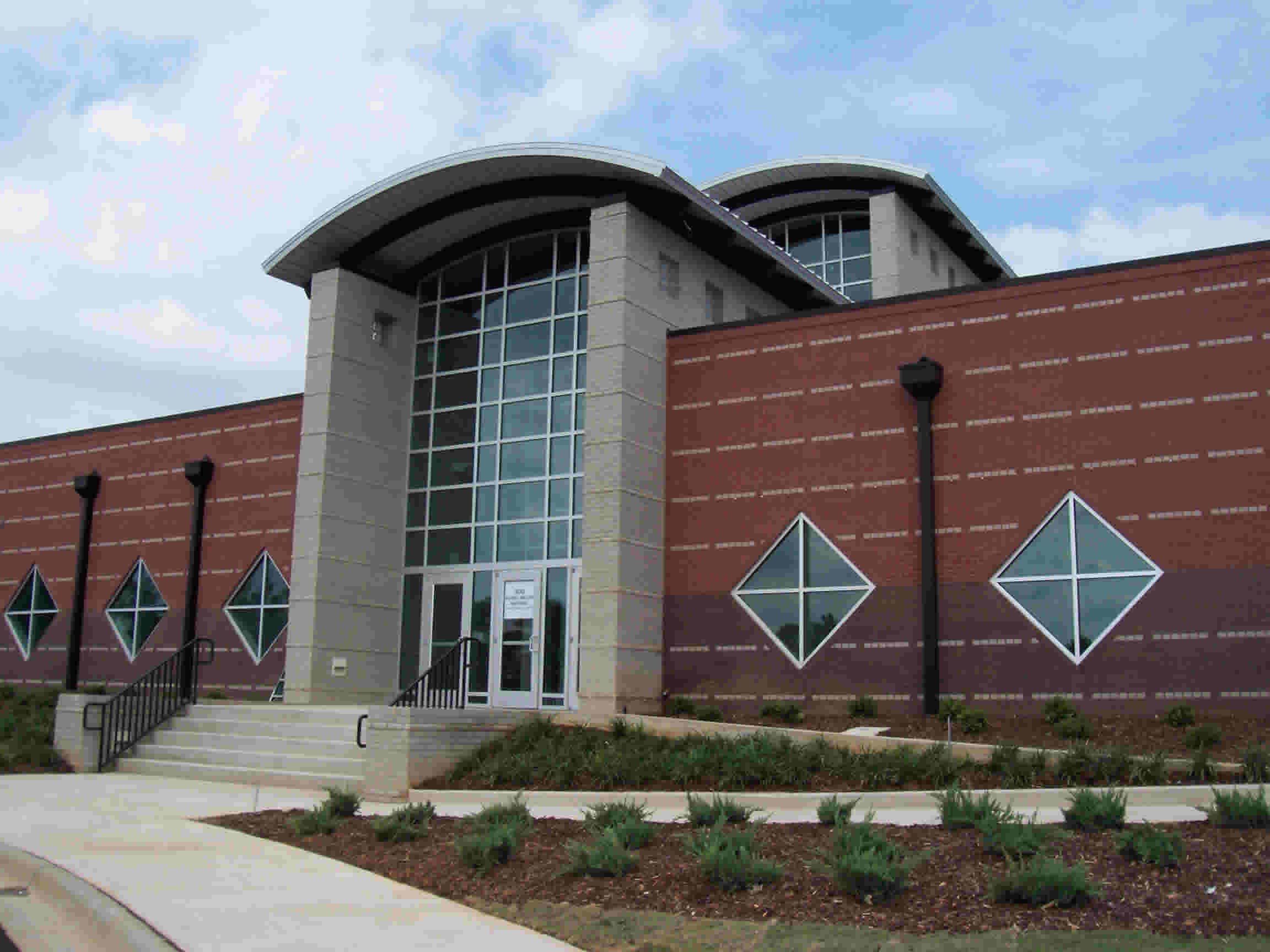
Brown branch library

The Brown branch library officially opened its doors on Sunday, September 10, 2006, with 4,000 square feet (370 m^{2}) within the Bobby Miller Activity Center in Taylorville. It closed permanently on February 2, 2024 due to lack of funding.

The Brown branch is named after James M. Brown and his sister Marine Brown. James and Marine Brown were the children of Judge James Clinton Brown and Mary Grace Maxwell of Tuscaloosa. James Brown was self-employed as a real estate and property appraiser for most of his career. He was best known for chronicling local news and events as editor for 55 years of the Exchange Club's newsletter, the Unitor.

== Departments ==
=== Readers' Advisory Services ===
Readers' Advisory Services is in the main fiction area. Patrons can either be directed to explore particular genres or to locate the next book in a series. The librarians there can draw upon various reference works (print and online) to help patrons with their fiction needs.

=== Youth services ===
==== Youth services' materials ====
- Over 60,000 books, 1500 videos and 500 books-on-cassette

===== Accelerated Reader Lists =====
Also known as the AR lists, the Accelerated Reader Lists are composed of lists of books for accelerated school readers. Local schools provide the lists to the library for their specific programs. Participating schools quiz their students on what they read and award points based on their understanding of the book. Not all county schools are represented and each school is responsible for the content of its list.

=== References ===
The Reference Department (the actual formal name being the Harrison Information Center) provides assistance to patrons in locating information. The reference collection consists of thousands of titles: individual works as well as general and subject-specific sets of encyclopedias, dictionaries, directories and other items.

The Reference Department also is responsible for the library's circulating non-fiction book collection. This collection encompasses a wide range of topics including such popular areas as cookbooks, pets, self-help and history. In 2014 all non-fiction DVDs, books-On-CD, and music CDs were relocated to the first floor to provide easier access to patrons.

=== Outreach services ===
==== Bookmobile ====
The first bookmobile service began in 1944 and was eventually discontinued in 1958. Bookmobile service resumed again in 1965 only to be discontinued again in 1982. In general, this service waxed and waned with the fortunes of the library. In 2009 the bookmobile service was expanded to two vehicles nicknamed "Dewey" and "Dora".

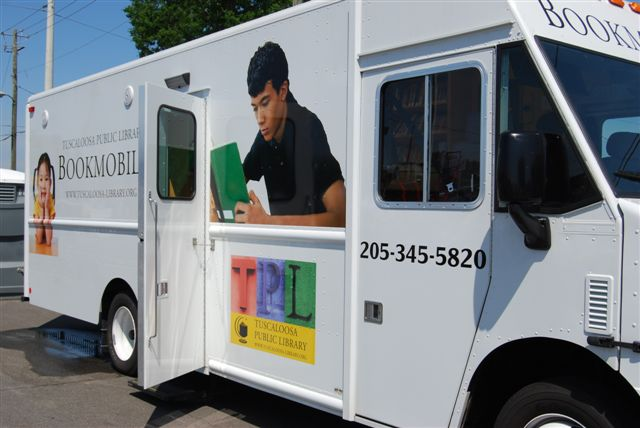
Bookmobile-Dewey

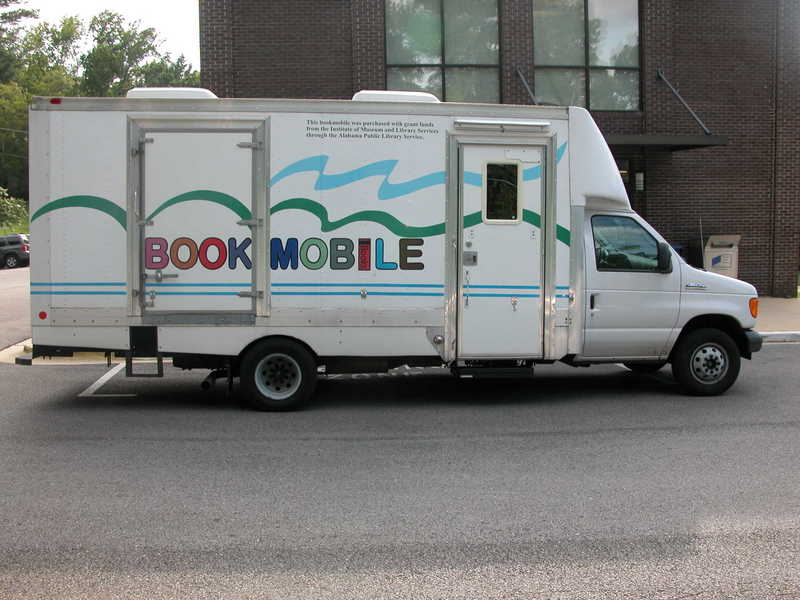
Bookmobile-Dora

The bookmobiles travel throughout Tuscaloosa County.

==== Books by Mail ====
Books by Mail is a free personalized delivery service of library materials to persons confined to their homes due to physical disability, extended illness, or unusual transportation problems. Every two months a catalog is mailed to each Books by Mail patron. The books requested are sent by mail along with return postage. Patrons can also request any other circulating library materials.

== Special collections ==
=== Archives ===
The Archive room houses materials considered too fragile for general browsing. It includes:

- Tuscaloosa city directories from 1929 to 2009.
- Tuscaloosa phone directories from 1948 to 2004.
- Tuscaloosa cross reference directories from 1966 to 2004.
- American Funeral Records (local) from 1905 to 1925.
- Casket sales (local) from November 1907 to March 1926.
- Records of Jones and Rogers Funeral Home April 1912 to 1919.
- The Tuscaloosa News (local newspaper) bound print materials from 50 years prior to the current year.

=== Local history/genealogy ===
The Local History and Genealogy section holds materials for researchers into history close to home. There are nearly 7,000 books on the shelves, concentrating on the Southeast and Alabama, with a special focus on West Central Alabama, the location of Tuscaloosa County.

=== Newspapers on microfilm ===
Various newspapers are listed on microfilm going back to the 19th century in Tuscaloosa County:

== Friends of the Library ==
The Friends of the Library is a local volunteer organization whose goal is supporting the Tuscaloosa Public Library in its public mission. On holidays and other special occasions the Friends prepare appreciation snacks and other meals for the staff. Two of its prominent contributions has been operating the Bookstore and Books Sandwiched In.

=== Bookstore ===
The Bookstore is where the Friends of the Library sells books and other donated items to the public. The proceeds go to the Tuscaloosa Public Library.
