= Mike Mahoney (American football) =

American football player and coach (born 1951)

Biographical details
- Born: September 7, 1951 (age 75); Uxbridge, Massachusetts, U.S.

Playing career
- 1970s: Southern Connecticut
- Position: Defensive tackle

Coaching career (HC unless noted)
- 1977: Arizona (GA)
- 1978: William & Mary (assistant)
- 1979–1980: Murray State (assistant)
- 1981–1986: Murray State (DC)
- 1987–1992: Murray State

Head coaching record
- Overall: 23-41-1

Mike Mahoney (born September 7, 1951) is an American former college football player and coach. He served as head football coach at Murray State University (MSU) from 1987 to 1992, compiling an overall record of 23–41–1.

== Head coaching record ==
Year	Team	Overall	Conference	Standing	Bowl/playoffs
Murray State Racers (Ohio Valley Conference) (1987–1992)
1987	Murray State	6–5	3–3	4th	
1988	Murray State	4–6	4–2	T–2nd	
1989	Murray State	6–4–1	3–3	T–3rd	
1990	Murray State	2–9	1–5	6th	
1991	Murray State	3–8	1–6	8th	
1992	Murray State	2–9	1–7	9th	
Murray State:		23-41-1	13–26–1		
Total:		23–41–1			
