= 1988 Eastern Kentucky Colonels football team =

American college football season

1988 Eastern Kentucky Colonels football

OVC champion

NCAA Division I-AA Semifinal, L 17–21 at Georgia Southern
- Conference: Ohio Valley Conference
- Record: 11–3 (6–0 OVC)
- Head coach: Roy Kidd (25th season)
- Home stadium: Hanger Field

1988 Ohio Valley Conference football standings
| | Conf. | | | | | Overall |
| Team | W | | L | | T | W | | L | | T |
|---|---|---|---|---|---|---|---|---|---|---|
| No. 7 Eastern Kentucky $^ | 6 | – | 0 | – | 0 | 11 | – | 3 | – | 0 |
| No. 17 Middle Tennessee | 4 | – | 2 | – | 0 | 7 | – | 4 | – | 0 |
| Murray State | 4 | – | 2 | – | 0 | 4 | – | 6 | – | 0 |
| Tennessee State | 2 | – | 4 | – | 0 | 3 | – | 7 | – | 1 |
| Austin Peay | 2 | – | 4 | – | 0 | 3 | – | 8 | – | 0 |
| Morehead State | 2 | – | 4 | – | 0 | 3 | – | 8 | – | 0 |
| Tennessee Tech | 1 | – | 5 | – | 0 | 1 | – | 10 | – | 0 |
$ – Conference champion; ^ – NCAA Division I-AA playoff participant; Rankings from NCAA Division I-AA Football Committee poll

The 1988 Eastern Kentucky Colonels football team represented Eastern Kentucky University as a member of the Ohio Valley Conference (OVC) during the 1988 NCAA Division I-AA football season. Led by 25th-year head coach Roy Kidd, the Colonels compiled an overall record of 11–3, with a mark of 6–0 in conference play, and finished as OVC champion. Eastern Kentucky advanced to the NCAA Division I-AA Semifinal and were defeated by Georgia Southern.

== Schedule ==
| Date | Opponent | Rank | Site | Result | Attendance | Source |
|---|---|---|---|---|---|---|
| September 10 | Delaware State* | No. T–3 | Hanger Field; Richmond, KY | W 48–7 | 21,700 | |
| September 17 | at No. 10 Marshall* | No. T–3 | Fairfield Stadium; Huntington, WV | L 32–34 | | |
| September 24 | at Western Kentucky* | No. 8 | L. T. Smith Stadium; Bowling Green, KY (rivalry) | L 14–16 | 18,000 | |
| October 1 | Tennessee State | No. 20 | Hanger Field; Richmond, KY | W 10–0 | 12,700 | |
| October 8 | at Austin Peay | No. 18 | Municipal Stadium; Clarksville, TN | W 56–10 | | |
| October 15 | Tennessee Tech | No. T–16 | Hanger Field; Richmond, KY | W 14–7 | | |
| October 22 | at Western Carolina* | No. 15 | E. J. Whitmire Stadium; Cullowhee, NC | W 32–14 | 11,420 | |
| October 29 | at Murray State | No. 14 | Roy Stewart Stadium; Murray, KY | W 31–24 | | |
| November 5 | No. 9 Middle Tennessee | No. 12 | Hanger Field; Richmond, KY | W 27–14 | 7,600 | |
| November 12 | UCF* | No. 8 | Hanger Field; Richmond, KY | W 35–31 | 6,800 | |
| November 19 | Morehead State | No. 8 | Hanger Field; Richmond, KY (rivalry) | W 39–17 | 4,400 | |
| November 26 | No. T–10 UMass* | No. 7 | Hanger Field; Richmond, KY (NCAA Division I-AA First Round) | W 28–17 | 4,600 | |
| December 3 | No. 13 Western Kentucky* | No. 7 | Hanger Field; Richmond, KY (NCAA Division I-AA Quarterfinal) | W 41–24 | 8,100 | |
| December 10 | at No. 2 Georgia Southern* | No. 7 | Paulson Stadium; Statesboro, GA (NCAA Division I-AA Semifinal) | L 17–21 | 14,023 | |
*Non-conference game; Rankings from NCAA Division I-AA Football Committee Poll released prior to the game
