= 1988 Murray State Racers football team =

American college football season

1988 Murray State Racers football
- Conference: Ohio Valley Conference
- Record: 4–6 (4–2 OVC)
- Head coach: Mike Mahoney (2nd season)
- Home stadium: Roy Stewart Stadium

1988 Ohio Valley Conference football standings
	Conf.					Overall
Team	W		L		T	W		L		T
No. 7 Eastern Kentucky $^	6	–	0	–	0	11	–	3	–	0
No. 17 Middle Tennessee	4	–	2	–	0	7	–	4	–	0
Murray State	4	–	2	–	0	4	–	6	–	0
Tennessee State	2	–	4	–	0	3	–	7	–	1
Austin Peay	2	–	4	–	0	3	–	8	–	0
Morehead State	2	–	4	–	0	3	–	8	–	0
Tennessee Tech	1	–	5	–	0	1	–	10	–	0
$ – Conference champion; ^ – NCAA Division I-AA playoff participant; Rankings from NCAA Division I-AA Football Committee poll

The 1988 Murray State Racers football team represented Murray State University during the 1988 NCAA Division I-AA football season as a member of the Ohio Valley Conference (OVC). Led by second-year head coach Mike Mahoney, the Racers compiled an overall record of 4–6, with a mark of 4–2 in conference play, and finished tied for second in the OVC.

== Schedule ==
Date	Opponent	Site	Result	Attendance	Source
September 3	Tennessee–Martin*	Roy Stewart Stadium; Murray, KY	L 24–32		
September 10	at Southeast Missouri State*	Houck Stadium; Cape Girardeau, MO	L 13–16		
September 17	at Southern Illinois*	McAndrew Stadium; Carbondale, IL	L 21–28	12,000	
September 24	at Nevada*	Mackay Stadium; Reno, NV	L 18–28	12,675	
October 1	Tennessee Tech	Roy Stewart Stadium; Murray, KY	L 13–16		
October 8	at Morehead State	Jayne Stadium; Morehead, KY	W 29–22	7,250	
October 15	Tennessee State	Roy Stewart Stadium; Murray, KY	W 22–7	3,850	
October 29	No. 14 Eastern Kentucky	Roy Stewart Stadium; Murray, KY	L 24–31		
November 12	No. 17 Middle Tennessee	Roy Stewart Stadium; Murray, KY	W 23–22	1,210	
November 19	at Austin Peay	Municipal Stadium; Clarksville, TN	W 19–3		
*Non-conference game; Rankings from NCAA Division I-AA Football Committee Poll released prior to the game
