= 1988 Middle Tennessee Blue Raiders football team =

American college football season

1988 Middle Tennessee Blue Raiders football
- Conference: Ohio Valley Conference
- Record: 7–4 (4–2 OVC)
- Head coach: Boots Donnelly (10th season)
- Home stadium: Johnny "Red" Floyd Stadium

1988 Ohio Valley Conference football standings
	Conf.					Overall
Team	W		L		T	W		L		T
No. 7 Eastern Kentucky $^	6	–	0	–	0	11	–	3	–	0
No. 17 Middle Tennessee	4	–	2	–	0	7	–	4	–	0
Murray State	4	–	2	–	0	4	–	6	–	0
Tennessee State	2	–	4	–	0	3	–	7	–	1
Austin Peay	2	–	4	–	0	3	–	8	–	0
Morehead State	2	–	4	–	0	3	–	8	–	0
Tennessee Tech	1	–	5	–	0	1	–	10	–	0
$ – Conference champion; ^ – NCAA Division I-AA playoff participant; Rankings from NCAA Division I-AA Football Committee poll

The 1988 Middle Tennessee Blue Raiders football team represented Middle Tennessee State University as a member of the Ohio Valley Conference (OVC) during the 1988 NCAA Division I-AA football season. Led by 10th-year head coach Boots Donnelly, the Blue Raiders compiled an overall record of 7–4, with a mark of 4–2 in conference play, and finished tied for second in the OVC.

== Schedule ==
Date	Opponent	Rank	Site	Result	Attendance	Source
September 3	at Tennessee State	No. 15	Vanderbilt Stadium; Nashville, TN	W 14–7	18,764	
September 10	at Northern Illinois*	No. 15	Huskie Stadium; DeKalb, IL	L 10–14	13,572	
September 17	No. 17 Western Kentucky*	No. 15	Johnny "Red" Floyd Stadium; Murfreesboro, TN	W 13–10	10,500	
September 24	No. T–6 Georgia Southern*	No. 20	Johnny "Red" Floyd Stadium; Murfreesboro, TN	W 26–10	6,800	
October 1	vs. Alcorn State*	No. 7	Mississippi Veterans Memorial Stadium; Jackson, MS	L 19–21		
October 8	Mississippi Valley State*	No. 16	Johnny "Red" Floyd Stadium; Murfreesboro, TN	W 40–3		
October 15	Morehead State	No. 12	Johnny "Red" Floyd Stadium; Murfreesboro, TN	W 49–0	12,500	
October 22	at Austin Peay	No. 9	Clarksville Municipal Stadium; Clarksville, TN	W 36–0	5,623	
November 5	at No. 12 Eastern Kentucky	No. 9	Hanger Field; Richmond, KY	L 14–27	7,600	
November 12	at Murray State	No. 17	Roy Stewart Stadium; Murray, KY	L 22–23	1,210	
November 19	Tennessee Tech		Johnny "Red" Floyd Stadium; Murfreesboro, TN	W 51–0		
*Non-conference game; Rankings from NCAA Division I-AA Football Committee Poll released prior to the game
