= Theophilus Danzy =

American football coach

Biographical details
- Born: May 20, 1930
- Died: November 27, 2012 (aged 82); Tuscaloosa, Alabama, U.S.

Coaching career (HC unless noted)
- 1964–1971: Alcorn State (assistant)
- 1972: Prairie View
- 1973–1976: Alcorn State (assistant)
- 1977–1978: Alabama A&M
- 1979: Arkansas–Pine Bluff (DC)
- 1980–1982: Miles
- 1983–1985: Alcorn State (assistant)
- 1986–1990: Alcorn State
- 1999–2005: Stillman

Head coaching record
- Overall: 84–88–3

Theophilus Danzy (May 20, 1930 – November 27, 2012) was an American college football coach. He served as the head football coach at Prairie View A&M University (1972), Alabama Agricultural and Mechanical University (1977–1978), Miles College (1980–1982), Alcorn State University (1986–1990), and Stillman College (1999–2005), compiling a career head coaching record of 84–88–3. He was an alumnus of Tennessee State University. Danzy died on November 27, 2012.

== Head coaching record ==
Year	Team	Overall	Conference	Standing	Bowl/playoffs
Prairie View A&M Panthers (Southwestern Athletic Conference) (1972)
1972	Prairie View A&M	5–5	1–5	T–4th	
Prairie View A&M:		5–5	1–5		
Alabama A&M Bulldogs (Southern Intercollegiate Athletic Conference) (1977–1978)
1977	Alabama A&M	2–9	1–4	T–5th (Division I)	
1978	Alabama A&M	7–4	4–1		
Alabama A&M:		9–13			
Miles Golden Bears (Southern Intercollegiate Athletic Conference) (1980–1982)
1980	Miles	2–4–2			
1981	Miles	2–7–1	1–1–1		
1982	Miles	1–9	1–3		
Miles:		5–20–3			
Alcorn State Braves (Southwestern Athletic Conference) (1986–1990)
1986	Alcorn State	5–5	5–2	2nd	
1987	Alcorn State	6–3	5–2	2nd	
1988	Alcorn State	6–4	4–3	T–3rd	
1989	Alcorn State	7–3	5–2	T–2nd	
1990	Alcorn State	2–7	2–4	T–5th	
Alcorn State:		26–22	21–13		
Stillman Tigers (NCAA Division III independent) (1999–2003)
1999	Stillman	3–5			
2000	Stillman	6–3			
2001	Stillman	6–4			
2002	Stillman	8–2			
2003	Stillman	5–5			
Stillman Tigers (NCAA Division II independent) (2004)
2004	Stillman	5–5			
Stillman Tigers (Southern Intercollegiate Athletic Conference) (2005)
2005	Stillman	6–4	5–4	T–4th	
Stillman:		39–28			
Total:		84–88–3			
