= 1988 Austin Peay Governors football team =

American college football season

1988 Austin Peay Governors football
- Conference: Ohio Valley Conference
- Record: 3–8 (2–4 OVC)
- Head coach: Paul Brewster (1st season)
- Home stadium: Municipal Stadium

1988 Ohio Valley Conference football standings
	Conf.					Overall
Team	W		L		T	W		L		T
No. 7 Eastern Kentucky $^	6	–	0	–	0	11	–	3	–	0
No. 17 Middle Tennessee	4	–	2	–	0	7	–	4	–	0
Murray State	4	–	2	–	0	4	–	6	–	0
Tennessee State	2	–	4	–	0	3	–	7	–	1
Austin Peay	2	–	4	–	0	3	–	8	–	0
Morehead State	2	–	4	–	0	3	–	8	–	0
Tennessee Tech	1	–	5	–	0	1	–	10	–	0
$ – Conference champion; ^ – NCAA Division I-AA playoff participant; Rankings from NCAA Division I-AA Football Committee poll

The 1988 Austin Peay Governors football team represented Austin Peay State University as a member of the Ohio Valley Conference (OVC) during the 1988 NCAA Division I-AA football season. Led by first-year head coach Paul Brewster, the Governors compiled an overall record of 3–8, with a mark of 2–4 in conference play, and finished tied for fourth in the OVC.

== Schedule ==
Date	Opponent	Site	Result	Attendance	Source
September 3	Kentucky State*	Municipal Stadium; Clarksville, TN	W 20–14		
September 10	at Eastern Illinois*	O'Brien Stadium; Charleston, IL	L 0–44		
September 17	at Cincinnati*	Nippert Stadium; Cincinnati, OH	L 7–52	12,373	
October 1	at No. 14 Western Kentucky*	L. T. Smith Stadium; Bowling Green, KY	L 3–28	7,500	
October 8	No. 18 Eastern Kentucky	Municipal Stadium; Clarksville, TN	L 10–56		
October 15	at Toledo*	Glass Bowl; Toledo, OH	L 14–38		
October 22	No. 9 Middle Tennessee	Municipal Stadium; Clarksville, TN	L 0–36	5,623	
October 29	at Morehead State	Jayne Stadium; Morehead, KY	L 6–43	3,750	
November 5	Tennessee State	Municipal Stadium; Clarksville, TN	W 16–12	6,217	
November 12	at Tennessee Tech	Tucker Stadium; Cookeville, TN	W 10–6	500	
November 19	Murray State	Municipal Stadium; Clarksville, TN	L 3–19		
*Non-conference game; Rankings from NCAA Division I-AA Football Committee Poll released prior to the game
