= Lena Prewitt =

American academic (1931–2024)

Lena Burrell Prewitt (February 17, 1931 – February 14, 2024) was the first African-American female professor to be appointed at the University of Alabama. Originally from Boiling Springs, Alabama (Wilcox County), Prewitt earned her master's degree in 1955 and her EdD in 1961. She is notable for having worked with Wernher von Braun at NASA on the Saturn V project.

== Academic work ==
After her time with NASA, Prewitt focused on her primary interest of teaching. She was teaching at Florence State College when she and her husband, Moses Kennedy Prewitt, left to accept positions at the University of Alabama in 1970, in what is now known as the Culverhouse College of Business. Additionally, Prewitt held various teaching and administrative positions at Stillman College, her alma mater. She has one child (son) and two grandchildren. Prewitt died in Tuscaloosa, Alabama on February 14, 2024 at the age of 92.
