= 1988 Grambling State Tigers football team =

American college football season

1988 Grambling State Tigers football
- Conference: Southwestern Athletic Conference
- Record: 8–3 (5–2 SWAC)
- Head coach: Eddie Robinson (46th season)
- Home stadium: Eddie G. Robinson Memorial Stadium

1988 Southwestern Athletic Conference football standings
	Conf.					Overall
Team	W		L		T	W		L		T
No. 5 Jackson State $^	7	–	0	–	0	8	–	1	–	2
No. 20 Grambling State	5	–	2	–	0	8	–	3	–	0
Alabama State	4	–	3	–	0	7	–	3	–	0
Alcorn State	4	–	3	–	0	6	–	4	–	0
Southern	4	–	3	–	0	6	–	5	–	0
Prairie View A&M	3	–	4	–	0	5	–	5	–	0
Mississippi Valley State	1	–	6	–	0	3	–	8	–	0
Texas Southern	0	–	7	–	0	0	–	11	–	0
$ – Conference champion; ^ – NCAA Division I-AA playoff participant; Rankings from NCAA Division I-AA Football Committee poll

The 1988 Grambling State Tigers football team represented Grambling State University as a member of the Southwestern Athletic Conference (SWAC) during the 1988 NCAA Division I-AA football season. Led by 46th-year head coach Eddie Robinson, the Tigers compiled an overall record of 8–3 and a mark of 5–2 in conference play, and finished second in the SWAC.

== Schedule ==
Date	Opponent	Rank	Site	Result	Attendance	Source
September 3	vs. Alcorn State		Independence Stadium; Shreveport, LA (Red River Classic)	W 27–13	29,500	
September 10	vs. Howard*		Giants Stadium; East Rutherford, NJ (Whitney Young Memorial Classic)	L 20–35	25,356	
September 24	vs. Bethune–Cookman*		Gator Bowl Stadium; Jacksonville, FL	W 17–16	8,600	
October 1	vs. Prairie View A&M		Cotton Bowl; Dallas, TX (rivalry)	W 40–14		
October 8	Tennessee State*		Eddie G. Robinson Memorial Stadium; Grambling, LA	W 35–33		
October 15	at Mississippi Valley State		Magnolia Stadium; Itta Bena, MS	W 27–17		
October 22	No. 17 Jackson State	No. 19	Eddie G. Robinson Memorial Stadium; Grambling, LA	L 17–24	13,107	
October 29	at Texas Southern		Houston Astrodome; Houston, TX	W 49–7		
November 5	Alabama State^{†}		Eddie G. Robinson Memorial Stadium; Grambling, LA	W 34–0	15,000	
November 10	at South Carolina State*		Oliver C. Dawson Stadium; Orangeburg, SC	W 45–16	11,158	
November 26	vs. Southern	No. 20	Louisiana Superdome; New Orleans, LA (Bayou Classic)	L 3–10		
*Non-conference game; ^{†}Homecoming; Rankings from NCAA Division I-AA Football Committee Poll released prior to the game
