= West Tuscaloosa =

Coordinates: 33.194°N 87.573°W

West Tuscaloosa is a neighborhood located in the western area of Tuscaloosa, Alabama, U.S.A. The area is generally defined as encompassing the portions of the city west of Interstate 359, south of the Black Warrior River and north of the Moody Swamp. This area serves as the location of two higher education facilities, Stillman College and Shelton State Community College (C.A. Fredd Campus).
