= 1988 Mississippi Valley State Delta Devils football team =

American college football season

1988 Mississippi Valley State Delta Devils football
- Conference: Southwestern Athletic Conference
- Record: 3–8 (1–6 SWAC)
- Head coach: Kenneth Pettiford (2nd season)
- Home stadium: Magnolia Stadium

1988 Southwestern Athletic Conference football standings
	Conf.					Overall
Team	W		L		T	W		L		T
No. 5 Jackson State $^	7	–	0	–	0	8	–	1	–	2
No. 20 Grambling State	5	–	2	–	0	8	–	3	–	0
Alabama State	4	–	3	–	0	7	–	3	–	0
Alcorn State	4	–	3	–	0	6	–	4	–	0
Southern	4	–	3	–	0	6	–	5	–	0
Prairie View A&M	3	–	4	–	0	5	–	5	–	0
Mississippi Valley State	1	–	6	–	0	3	–	8	–	0
Texas Southern	0	–	7	–	0	0	–	11	–	0
$ – Conference champion; ^ – NCAA Division I-AA playoff participant; Rankings from NCAA Division I-AA Football Committee poll

The 1988 Mississippi Valley State Delta Devils football team represented Mississippi Valley State University as a member of the Southwestern Athletic Conference (SWAC) during the 1988 NCAA Division I-AA football season. Led by second-year head coach Kenneth Pettiford, the Delta Devils compiled an overall record of 3–8, with a conference record of 1–6, and finished seventh in the SWAC.

== Schedule ==
Date	Opponent	Site	Result	Source
September 3	Miles*	Magnolia Stadium; Itta Bena, MS	W 48–14	
September 10	at Arkansas–Pine Bluff*	War Memorial Stadium; Little Rock, AR	W 27–20	
September 17	vs. Tennessee State*	Liberty Bowl Memorial Stadium; Memphis, TN	L 6–13	
September 24	at Jackson State	Mississippi Veterans Memorial Stadium; Jackson, MS	L 14–35	
October 1	at Southern	A. W. Mumford Stadium; Baton Rouge, LA	L 7–45	
October 8	at No. 16 Middle Tennessee*	Johnny "Red" Floyd Stadium; Murfreesboro, TN	L 3–40	
October 15	Grambling State	Magnolia Stadium; Itta Bena, MS	L 17–27	
October 22	at Texas Southern	Robertson Stadium; Houston, TX	W 24–15	
October 29	Prairie View A&M	Magnolia Stadium; Itta Bena, MS	L 7–36	
November 5	Alcorn State	Magnolia Stadium; Itta Bena, MS	L 3–24	
November 12	Alabama State	Magnolia Stadium; Itta Bena, MS	L 0–23	
*Non-conference game; Rankings from NCAA Division I-AA Football Committee Poll released prior to the game
