= 1988 Morehead State Eagles football team =

American college football season

1988 Morehead State Eagles football
- Conference: Ohio Valley Conference
- Record: 3–8 (2–4 OVC)
- Head coach: Bill Baldridge (5th season)
- Home stadium: Jayne Stadium

1988 Ohio Valley Conference football standings
| | Conf. | | | | | Overall |
| Team | W | | L | | T | W | | L | | T |
|---|---|---|---|---|---|---|---|---|---|---|
| No. 7 Eastern Kentucky $^ | 6 | – | 0 | – | 0 | 11 | – | 3 | – | 0 |
| No. 17 Middle Tennessee | 4 | – | 2 | – | 0 | 7 | – | 4 | – | 0 |
| Murray State | 4 | – | 2 | – | 0 | 4 | – | 6 | – | 0 |
| Tennessee State | 2 | – | 4 | – | 0 | 3 | – | 7 | – | 1 |
| Austin Peay | 2 | – | 4 | – | 0 | 3 | – | 8 | – | 0 |
| Morehead State | 2 | – | 4 | – | 0 | 3 | – | 8 | – | 0 |
| Tennessee Tech | 1 | – | 5 | – | 0 | 1 | – | 10 | – | 0 |
$ – Conference champion; ^ – NCAA Division I-AA playoff participant; Rankings from NCAA Division I-AA Football Committee poll

The 1988 Morehead State Eagles football team represented Morehead State University as a member of the Ohio Valley Conference (OVC) during the 1988 NCAA Division I-AA football season. Led by fifth-year head coach Bill Baldridge, the Eagles compiled an overall record of 3–8, with a mark of 2–4 in conference play, and finished tied for fourth in the OVC.

== Schedule ==
| Date | Opponent | Site | Result | Attendance | Source |
|---|---|---|---|---|---|
| September 3 | No. 10 Marshall* | Jayne Stadium; Morehead, KY | L 17–30 | 9,500 | |
| September 10 | No. 17 Western Kentucky* | Jayne Stadium; Morehead, KY | L 0–34 | 6,500 | |
| September 17 | at Kentucky State* | Alumni Field; Frankfort, KY | W 29–12 | | |
| September 24 | at Liberty* | City Stadium; Lynchburg, VA | L 9–34 | 4,850 | |
| October 1 | Samford* | Jayne Stadium; Morehead, KY | L 17–18 | 3,750 | |
| October 8 | Murray State | Jayne Stadium; Morehead, KY | L 22–29 | 7,250 | |
| October 15 | at No. 12 Middle Tennessee | Johnny "Red" Floyd Stadium; Murfreesboro, TN | L 0–49 | 12,500 | |
| October 22 | Tennessee State | Jayne Stadium; Morehead, KY | L 14–29 | | |
| October 29 | Austin Peay | Jayne Stadium; Morehead, KY | W 43–6 | 3,750 | |
| November 5 | at Tennessee Tech | Tucker Stadium; Cookeville, TN | W 20–3 | | |
| November 19 | at No. 8 Eastern Kentucky | Hanger Field; Richmond, KY (rivalry) | L 17–39 | 4,400 | |
*Non-conference game; Rankings from NCAA Division I-AA Football Committee Poll released prior to the game
