= 1988 Alabama State Hornets football team =

American college football season

1988 Alabama State Hornets football
- Conference: Southwestern Athletic Conference
- Record: 7–3 (4–3 SWAC)
- Head coach: Houston Markham (2nd season)
- Offensive coordinator: Darwin Valentine (2nd season)
- Home stadium: Cramton Bowl

1988 Southwestern Athletic Conference football standings
	Conf.					Overall
Team	W		L		T	W		L		T
No. 5 Jackson State $^	7	–	0	–	0	8	–	1	–	2
No. 20 Grambling State	5	–	2	–	0	8	–	3	–	0
Alabama State	4	–	3	–	0	7	–	3	–	0
Alcorn State	4	–	3	–	0	6	–	4	–	0
Southern	4	–	3	–	0	6	–	5	–	0
Prairie View A&M	3	–	4	–	0	5	–	5	–	0
Mississippi Valley State	1	–	6	–	0	3	–	8	–	0
Texas Southern	0	–	7	–	0	0	–	11	–	0
$ – Conference champion; ^ – NCAA Division I-AA playoff participant; Rankings from NCAA Division I-AA Football Committee poll

The 1988 Alabama State Hornets football team represented Alabama State University as a member of the Southwestern Athletic Conference (SWAC) during the 1988 NCAA Division I-AA football season. Led by second-year head coach Houston Markham, the Hornets compiled an overall record of 7–3, with a mark of 4–3 in conference play, and finished tied for third in the SWAC.

== Schedule ==
Date	Opponent	Site	Result	Attendance	Source
September 10	at Southern	A. W. Mumford Stadium; Baton Rouge, LA	L 12–20	19,890	
September 17	at Alcorn State	Henderson Stadium; Lorman, MS	W 29–6		
September 24	vs. Texas Southern	Ladd Stadium; Mobile, AL (Gulf Coast Classic)	W 20–6		
October 8	Jackson State	Cramton Bowl; Montgomery, AL	L 7–21	15,000	
October 15	at Albany State*	Hugh Mills Stadium; Albany, GA	W 16–10	4,000	
October 22	vs. Prairie View A&M	Texas Memorial Stadium; Austin, TX (Capital City Classic)	W 45–7		
October 29	vs. Alabama A&M*	Legion Field; Birmingham, AL (Magic City Classic)	W 7–0		
November 5	at Grambling State	Eddie G. Robinson Memorial Stadium; Grambling, LA	L 0–34	15,000	
November 12	at Mississippi Valley State	Magnolia Stadium; Itta Bena, MS	W 23–0		
November 24	Tuskegee*	Cramton Bowl; Montgomery, AL (Turkey Day Classic)	W 17–0	25,300	
*Non-conference game
