= 1988 Southern Jaguars football team =

American college football season

1988 Southern Jaguars football
- Conference: Southwestern Athletic Conference
- Record: 7–4 (5–2 SWAC)
- Head coach: Marino Casem (2nd season)
- Home stadium: A. W. Mumford Stadium

1988 Southwestern Athletic Conference football standings
	Conf.					Overall
Team	W		L		T	W		L		T
No. 5 Jackson State $^	7	–	0	–	0	8	–	1	–	2
No. 20 Grambling State	5	–	2	–	0	8	–	3	–	0
Alabama State	4	–	3	–	0	7	–	3	–	0
Alcorn State	4	–	3	–	0	6	–	4	–	0
Southern	4	–	3	–	0	6	–	5	–	0
Prairie View A&M	3	–	4	–	0	5	–	5	–	0
Mississippi Valley State	1	–	6	–	0	3	–	8	–	0
Texas Southern	0	–	7	–	0	0	–	11	–	0
$ – Conference champion; ^ – NCAA Division I-AA playoff participant; Rankings from NCAA Division I-AA Football Committee poll

The 1988 Southern Jaguars football team represented Southern University as a member of the Southwestern Athletic Conference (SWAC) during the 1988 NCAA Division I-AA football season. Led by second-year head coach Marino Casem, the Jaguars compiled an overall record of 7–4, with a conference record of 5–2, and finished tied for third in the SWAC.

== Schedule ==
Date	Opponent	Site	Result	Attendance	Source
September 10	Alabama State	A. W. Mumford Stadium; Baton Rouge, LA	W 20–12	19,890	
September 19	at Texas Southern	Rice Stadium; Houston, TX	W 24–16		
September 24	Prairie View A&M	A. W. Mumford Stadium; Baton Rouge, LA	W 14–20 (forfeit win)		
October 1	Mississippi Valley State	A. W. Mumford Stadium; Baton Rouge, LA	W 45–7		
October 8	at Nicholls State*	John L. Guidry Stadium; Thibodaux, LA	L 0–24		
October 15	No. 17 Jackson State	A. W. Mumford Stadium; Baton Rouge, LA (rivalry)	L 3–23		
October 22	at Alcorn State	Henderson Stadium; Lorman, MS	L 7–27		
October 29	Florida A&M*	A. W. Mumford Stadium; Baton Rouge, LA	L 20–45	20,553	
November 5	at Bethune–Cookman*	Daytona Stadium; Daytona Beach, FL	W 20–13		
November 12	at Tennessee State*	Vanderbilt Stadium; Nashville, TN	W 10–7	14,538	
November 26	vs. No. 20 Grambling State	Louisiana Superdome; New Orleans, LA (Bayou Classic)	W 10–3		
*Non-conference game; Rankings from NCAA Division I-AA Football Committee Poll released prior to the game
