= Ruth Bolden =

American activist (1910–2004)

Leader in the Local Civil Rights Movement.

Personal details
- Born: May 15, 1910 Bibb County, Alabama, U.S.
- Died: May 12, 2004 (aged 93)
- Education: Stillman College
- Occupation: Library founder and Civil rights worker

Ruth Bolden (May 15, 1910 – May 12, 2004) was a library founder and civil rights worker. She helped found what would become the Weaver-Bolden Branch Library (part of the Tuscaloosa Public Library system) in Tuscaloosa, Alabama, which is now named in honor of her and of Dr. George Weaver.

== Life and career ==
Bolden was born in Bibb County, Alabama, on May 15, 1910. She worked to put herself through school and graduated from Stillman College in 1952. She later received her master's degree in library science from Atlanta University.

In 1948, she procured county money to start a library in the local community center in West Tuscaloosa (West End). In 1961, she secured funding to build a new library. She was the first librarian of that library and requested that the library be named for Dr. George Augustus Weaver (1872 -1939), a prominent black citizen who allowed local young people to use his private library. In 1991, this branch of the Tuscaloosa Public Library was renamed the Weaver-Bolden branch in her honor.

Bolden was a follower of T.Y. Rogers, who was a leader in the local Civil Rights Movement. She was a member of the Tuscaloosa Citizens Action Committee and helped register blacks to vote.

Bolden was among those who were in First African Baptist Church planning a civil rights march when it was tear-gassed by local authorities on June 9, 1964, a day known by many as "Bloody Tuesday".

== Awards and recognitions ==
Bolden held several distinguished memberships and honors, including membership in the First African Baptist Church, the League of Women Voters, Bryce Human Rights Committee (appointed by the Federal Court), the Tuscaloosa County Jury Commission and was president of the Stillman College National Alumni Association. Bolden was also named Alabama Black Woman of the Year.

"Readers are leaders" was her motto. Mrs. Bolden passed on May 12, 2004, three days before her 94th birthday, and is buried in Cedar Oak Memorial Park in Tuscaloosa, Alabama.
