= 1988 Texas Southern Tigers football team =

American college football season

1988 Texas Southern Tigers football
- Conference: Southwestern Athletic Conference
- Record: 0–11 (0–7 SWAC)
- Head coach: Lionel Taylor (5th season)
- Home stadium: Robertson Stadium; Rice Stadium; Houston Astrodome

1988 Southwestern Athletic Conference football standings
	Conf.					Overall
Team	W		L		T	W		L		T
No. 5 Jackson State $^	7	–	0	–	0	8	–	1	–	2
No. 20 Grambling State	5	–	2	–	0	8	–	3	–	0
Alabama State	4	–	3	–	0	7	–	3	–	0
Alcorn State	4	–	3	–	0	6	–	4	–	0
Southern	4	–	3	–	0	6	–	5	–	0
Prairie View A&M	3	–	4	–	0	5	–	5	–	0
Mississippi Valley State	1	–	6	–	0	3	–	8	–	0
Texas Southern	0	–	7	–	0	0	–	11	–	0
$ – Conference champion; ^ – NCAA Division I-AA playoff participant; Rankings from NCAA Division I-AA Football Committee poll

The 1988 Texas Southern Tigers football team represented Texas Southern University as a member of the Southwestern Athletic Conference (SWAC) during the 1988 NCAA Division I-AA football season. Led by fifth-year head coach Lionel Taylor, the Tigers compiled an overall record of 0–11, with a mark of 0–7 in conference play, and finished eighth in the SWAC.

== Schedule ==
Date	Opponent	Site	Result	Source
September 3	Prairie View A&M	Robertson Stadium; Houston, TX (Labor Day Classic)	L 10–13	
September 10	No. 4 (D-II) Texas A&I*	Robertson Stadium; Houston, TX	L 6–51	
September 19	Southern	Rice Stadium; Houston, TX	L 16–24	
September 24	vs. Alabama State	Ladd Stadium; Mobile, AL (Gulf Coast Classic)	L 6–20	
October 1	at Sam Houston State*	Bowers Stadium; Huntsville, TX	L 7–22	
October 8	at Alcorn State	Henderson Stadium; Lorman, MS	L 7–28	
October 15	at Southwest Texas State*	Bobcat Stadium; San Marcos, TX	L 7–38	
October 22	Mississippi Valley State	Robertson Stadium; Houston, TX	L 15–24	
October 29	Grambling State	Houston Astrodome; Houston, TX	L 7–49	
November 5	at No. 13 Jackson State	Mississippi Veterans Memorial Stadium; Jackson, MS	L 0–26	
November 19	at Nicholls State*	John L. Guidry Stadium; Thibodaux, LA	L 13–26	
*Non-conference game; Rankings from NCAA Division I-AA Football Committee Poll released prior to the game
