= 1988 Alcorn State Braves football team =

American college football season

1988 Alcorn State Braves football
- Conference: Southwestern Athletic Conference
- Record: 6–4 (4–3 SWAC)
- Head coach: Theophilus Danzy (3rd season)
- Home stadium: Henderson Stadium

1988 Southwestern Athletic Conference football standings
	Conf.					Overall
Team	W		L		T	W		L		T
No. 5 Jackson State $^	7	–	0	–	0	8	–	1	–	2
No. 20 Grambling State	5	–	2	–	0	8	–	3	–	0
Alabama State	4	–	3	–	0	7	–	3	–	0
Alcorn State	4	–	3	–	0	6	–	4	–	0
Southern	4	–	3	–	0	6	–	5	–	0
Prairie View A&M	3	–	4	–	0	5	–	5	–	0
Mississippi Valley State	1	–	6	–	0	3	–	8	–	0
Texas Southern	0	–	7	–	0	0	–	11	–	0
$ – Conference champion; ^ – NCAA Division I-AA playoff participant; Rankings from NCAA Division I-AA Football Committee poll

The 1988 Alcorn State Braves football team represented Alcorn State University as a member of the Southwestern Athletic Conference (SWAC) during the 1988 NCAA Division I-AA football season. Led by third-year head coach Theophilus Danzy, the Braves compiled an overall record of 6–4, with a conference record of 4–3, and finished tied for third in the SWAC.

== Schedule ==
Date	Opponent	Site	Result	Attendance	Source
September 3	vs. Grambling State	Independence Stadium; Shreveport, LA (Red River Classic)	L 13–27	29,500	
September 17	Alabama State	Henderson Stadium; Lorman, MS	L 6–29		
September 24	at Abilene Christian*	Shotwell Stadium; Abilene, TX	W 34–13		
October 1	vs. No. 7 Middle Tennessee*	Mississippi Veterans Memorial Stadium; Jackson, MS	W 21–19		
October 8	Texas Southern	Henderson Stadium; Lorman, MS	W 28–7		
October 15	at Lamar*	Cardinal Stadium; Beaumont, TX	L 6–35		
October 22	Southern	Henderson Stadium; Lorman, MS	W 27–7		
November 5	Mississippi Valley State	Magnolia Stadium; Itta Bena, MS	W 24–3	6,000	
November 12	at Prairie View A&M	Edward L. Blackshear Field; Prairie View, TX	W 26–7		
November 19	at No. 6 Jackson State	Mississippi Veterans Memorial Stadium; Jackson, MS (rivalry)	L 0–7	23,404	
*Non-conference game; Rankings from NCAA Division I-AA Football Committee Poll released prior to the game
