= 1988 Prairie View A&M Panthers football team =

American college football season

1988 Prairie View A&M Panthers football
- Conference: Southwestern Athletic Conference
- Record: 4–6 (2–5 SWAC)
- Head coach: Haney Catchings (1st season)
- Defensive coordinator: Ronald Beard (5th season)
- Home stadium: Edward L. Blackshear Field

1988 Southwestern Athletic Conference football standings
	Conf.					Overall
Team	W		L		T	W		L		T
No. 5 Jackson State $^	7	–	0	–	0	8	–	1	–	2
No. 20 Grambling State	5	–	2	–	0	8	–	3	–	0
Alabama State	4	–	3	–	0	7	–	3	–	0
Alcorn State	4	–	3	–	0	6	–	4	–	0
Southern	4	–	3	–	0	6	–	5	–	0
Prairie View A&M	3	–	4	–	0	5	–	5	–	0
Mississippi Valley State	1	–	6	–	0	3	–	8	–	0
Texas Southern	0	–	7	–	0	0	–	11	–	0
$ – Conference champion; ^ – NCAA Division I-AA playoff participant; Rankings from NCAA Division I-AA Football Committee poll

The 1988 Prairie View A&M Panthers football team represented Prairie View A&M University as a member of the Southwestern Athletic Conference (SWAC) during the 1988 NCAA Division I-AA football season. Led by head coach Haney Catchings in his first full-year as head coach, the Panthers compiled an overall record of 4–6 and a mark of 2–5 in conference play, and finished sixth in the SWAC.

== Schedule ==
Date	Opponent	Site	Result	Attendance	Source
September 3	at Texas Southern	Robertson Stadium; Houston, TX (Labor Day Classic)	W 13–10		
September 10	at Stephen F. Austin*	Homer Bryce Stadium; Nacogdoches, TX	L 3–38		
September 17	at Jackson State	Mississippi Veterans Memorial Stadium; Jackson, MS	L 7–33	18,005	
September 24	at Southern	A. W. Mumford Stadium; Baton Rouge, LA	L 20–14 (forfeit)		
October 1	vs. Grambling State	Cotton Bowl; Dallas, TX (State Fair Classic)	L 14–40		
October 8	Arkansas–Pine Bluff*	Rice Stadium; Houston, TX	W 13–3		
October 22	vs. Alabama State	Texas Memorial Stadium; Austin, TX (Capital City Classic)	L 7–45		
October 29	at Mississippi Valley State	Magnolia Stadium; Itta Bena, MS	W 36–7		
November 12	Alcorn State	Edward L. Blackshear Field; Prairie View, TX	L 7–26		
November 19	Langston*	Edward L. Blackshear Field; Prairie View, TX	W 17–12		
*Non-conference game
