= Paul Brewster (American football) =

American football coach (1935–2021)

Biographical details
- Born: October 26, 1935
- Died: August 8, 2021 (aged 85)

Coaching career (HC unless noted)
- c. 1965: Science Hill HS (TN) (assistant)
- 1969–1980: Oak Ridge HS (TN) (assistant)
- 1981–1987: Austin Peay (assistant)
- 1988–1989: Austin Peay

Head coaching record
- Overall: 3–19

Joe Paul Brewster (October 26, 1935 – August 8, 2021) was an American football coach. He served as the head football coach at Austin Peay State University from 1988 to 1989, compiling a record of 3–19. A native of Lenoir City, Tennessee, Brewster earned a bachelor's degree in 1958 and a master's degree in 1967 at East Tennessee State University. He came to Austin Peay in 1981 as an assistant coach under his predecessor as head coach, Emory Hale.

Brewster died on August 8, 2021.

== Head coaching record ==
Year	Team	Overall	Conference	Standing	Bowl/playoffs
Austin Peay Governors (Ohio Valley Conference) (1988–1989)
1988	Austin Peay	3–8	2–4	T–4th	
1989	Austin Peay	0–11	0–6	7th	
Austin Peay:		3–19	2–10		
Total:		3–19			
