= Willie Hunter (American football) =

American football player and coach

Playing career
- 1953–1956: Fort Valley State
- 1963–1964: Atlanta Spartans
- Position: Defensive back

Coaching career (HC unless noted)
- 1960–1961: Carver HS (GA) (JV)
- 1962–1968: Carver HS (GA) (DC)
- 1969–1974: Sylvan Hills HS (GA) (DC)
- 1975–1976: Sylvan Hills HS (GA)
- 1978: Georgia Tech (OL)
- 1979–1988: Fulton HS (GA)
- 1989: Clark Atlanta (DC)
- 1990–1996: Clark Atlanta

Head coaching record
- Overall: 29–41–1 (college); 101–25 (high school)

Accomplishments and honors

Championships
- 1 SIAC (1991)

Willie Hunter is an American former football player and coach. He served as the head football coach at Clark Atlanta University from 1990 to 1996.

Hunter played college football at Fort Valley State College and also played professionally for the Atlanta Spartans of the Atlantic Coast Football League in 1964. After teaching and coaching football in the Atlanta Public Schools system for 33 years, he resigned in 1989 and was hired as the defensive coordinator at Clark Atlanta. In January 1990, Hunter succeeded William M. Spencer as head coach after Spencer was fired.

== Head coaching record ==
=== College ===
Year	Team	Overall	Conference	Standing	Bowl/playoffs
Clark Atlanta Panthers (Southern Intercollegiate Athletic Conference) (1990–1996)
1990	Clark Atlanta	4–6	2–5	T–6th	
1991	Clark Atlanta	6–3–1	5–2	T–1st	
1992	Clark Atlanta	3–7	3–4	T–5th	
1993	Clark Atlanta	3–7	2–5	8th	
1994	Clark Atlanta	3–7	2–5	T–6th	
1995	Clark Atlanta	5–5	5–3	T–2nd	
1990	Clark Atlanta	5–6	5–3	T–2nd	
Clark Atlanta:		29–41–1	24–27		
Total:		29–41–1			
National championship Conference title Conference division title or championship game berth
