= Brian Witherspoon =

American football player (born 1985)

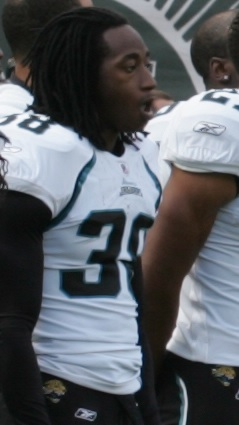
- Witherspoon in 2009

No. 38, 36, 29
- Position: Cornerback / Return specialist

Personal information
- Born: June 5, 1985 (age 41); Butler, Alabama, U.S.
- Listed height: 5 ft 10 in (1.78 m)
- Listed weight: 175 lb (79 kg)

Career information
- High school: Choctaw County (Butler)
- College: Stillman
- NFL draft: 2008: undrafted

Career history
- Jacksonville Jaguars (2008−2009); Detroit Lions (2009); Carolina Panthers (2010)*; New York Giants (2010−2012)
- * Offseason or practice squad member only

Awards and highlights
- Super Bowl champion (XLVI); First-team NCAA Division II All-American (2007)

Career NFL statistics
- Total tackles: 15
- Fumble recoveries: 1
- Return yards: 2,170
- Stats at Pro Football Reference

Brian Witherspoon (born June 5, 1985) is an American former professional football player who was a cornerback and return specialist in the National Football League (NFL). He played college football for the Stillman Tigers and was signed by the Jacksonville Jaguars as an undrafted free agent in 2008. After his football career, he became a track and field runner.

== Professional career ==
Pre-draft measurables
Height	Weight	40-yard dash	10-yard split	20-yard split	20-yard shuttle	Three-cone drill	Vertical jump	Broad jump
6 ft 1 in (1.85 m)	195 lb (88 kg)	4.22 s	1.42 s	2.51 s	4.36 s	6.86 s	40 in (1.02 m)	10 ft 10 in (3.30 m)
All values from NFL Combine

Witherspoon was signed by the Jacksonville Jaguars as an undrafted free agent in 2008.

He tore his ACL for a second straight season during offseason practices with the Giants, and was waived/injured on May 24.

Witherspoon has also played for the Detroit Lions, Carolina Panthers and New York Giants.

== Track and field ==
In July 2013, Witherspoon retired from football to be a full-time track and field runner. He qualified for the US Track & Field Nationals in both the 100 meters, with a time of 10.22 seconds, and 200 meters, with a time of 20.66 seconds.

Personal bests

Event	Time (seconds)	Venue	Date
60 meters	6.78	Daytona Beach, Florida	February 16, 2013
100 meters	10.22	Montverde, Florida	June 8, 2013
200 meters	20.66	Montverde, Florida	June 8, 2013
