= Stillman College =

Historically black private college in Tuscaloosa, Alabama, US

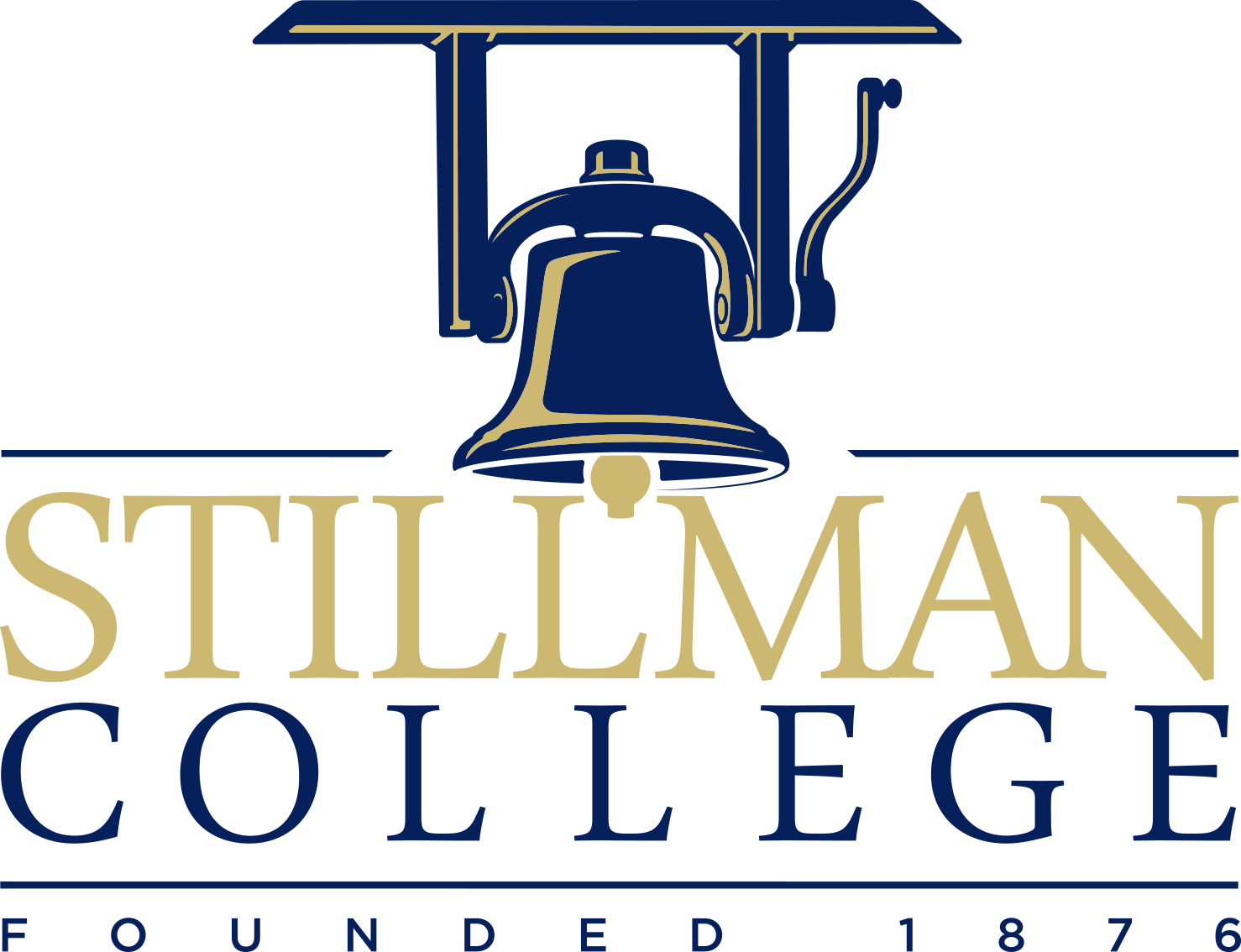
- Former names: Tuscaloosa Institute (1876–1895); Stillman Institute (1895–1948)
- Type: Private historically black college
- Established: 1876; 150 years ago
- Accreditation: SACS
- Affiliations: APCU; UNCF; CIC
- Religious affiliation: Presbyterian Church (USA)
- Academic affiliations: CIC
- Endowment: $25,812,266
- President: Yolanda W. Page
- Students: 917
- Location: Tuscaloosa, Alabama, U.S. 33°11′53″N 87°35′7″W
- Campus: 105 acres (42 ha)
- Colors: Navy blue and Vegas gold
- Nicknames: Tigers & Lady Tigers
- Sporting affiliations: NAIA – HBCUAC
- Website: www.stillman.edu
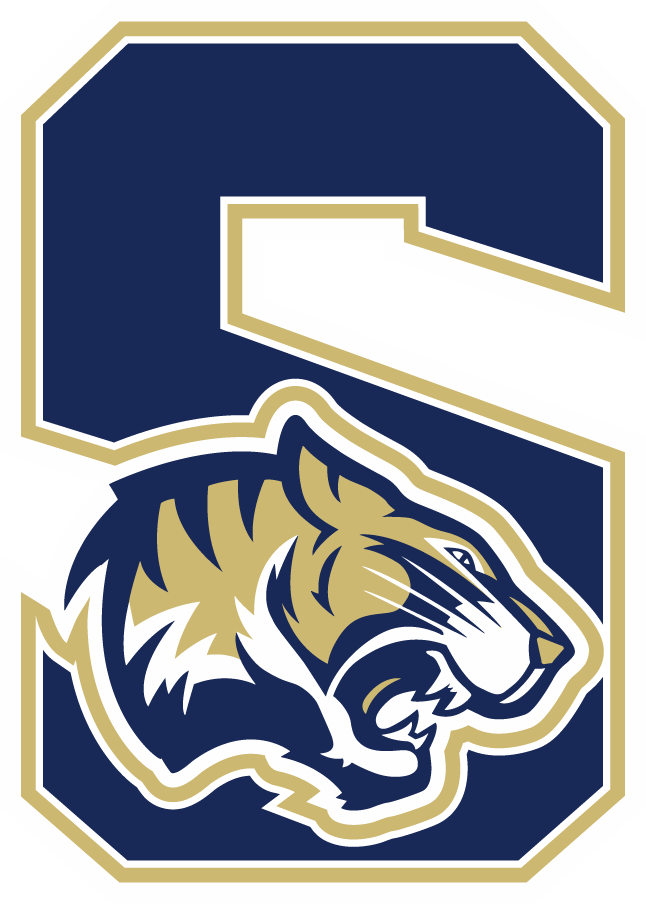
- Stillman College
- U.S. National Register of Historic Places
- Alabama Register of Landmarks and Heritage
- Location within Alabama Location within the United States
- Built: 1907
- NRHP reference No.: 100004680

Significant dates
- Added to NRHP: March 16, 2021
- Designated ARLH: June 23, 2016

Stillman College is a private historically black Presbyterian college in Tuscaloosa, Alabama. It awards Bachelor of Arts and Bachelor of Science degrees in 22 programs housed within three academic schools (School of Arts and Sciences, School of Business Entrepreneurship and CIS, amend School of Education). The college has an average enrollment of 728 students and is accredited by the Southern Association of Colleges and Schools.

== History ==
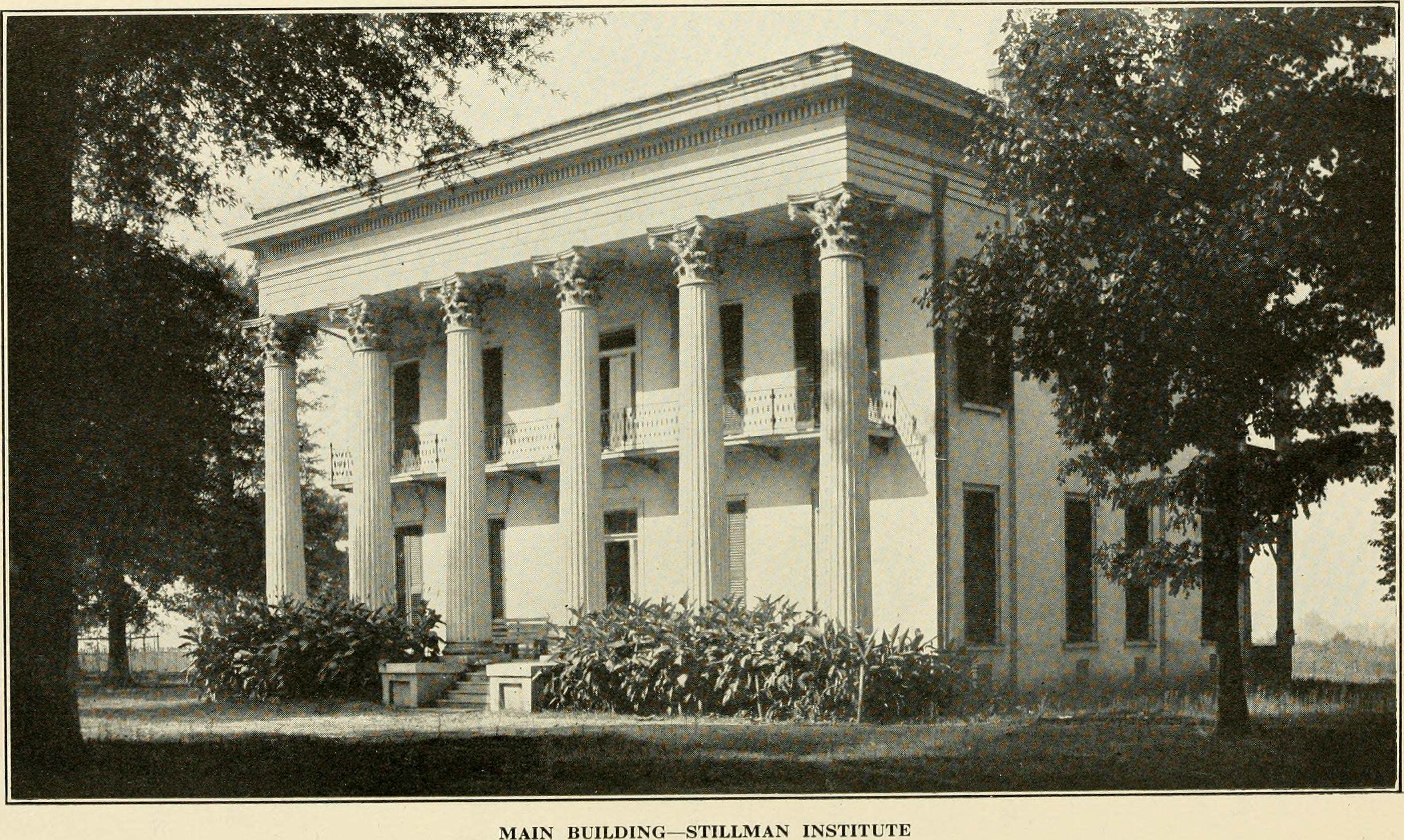
The Main Building in 1914.

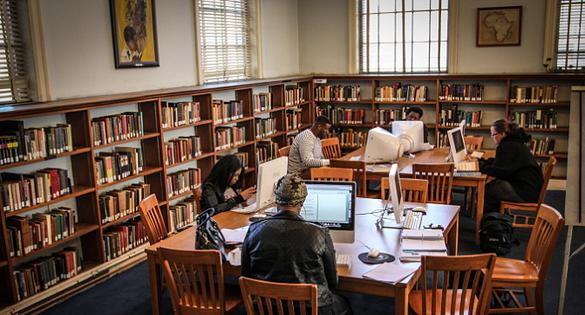
The Stillman College library (2012).

Academic rankings

Regional
- U.S. News & World Report: 78 (tie) of 90

National
- Washington Monthly: 136 of 242

Stillman College was founded as Tuscaloosa Institute, when it was authorized by the General Assembly of the Presbyterian Church in the United States in 1875, and held its first classes in 1876. It was chartered as a legal corporation by the State of Alabama in 1895. At that time, the name was changed from Tuscaloosa Institute to Stillman Institute. The institute was a concept initiated by Charles Allen Stillman, pastor of First Presbyterian Church of Tuscaloosa, "for the training of colored men for the ministry". The mandate for the Institution expanded over the years and it acquired its present campus tract of over 100 acres (0.40 km^{2}). A junior and senior high school was organized and the Institute established a junior college program, which was accredited in 1937. In addition, between 1930 and 1946, it operated a hospital and nurse training school.

Under the administration of Samuel Burney Hay (1948–1965), the school sought to expand into a senior liberal arts institution and in 1948 the name was officially changed to Stillman College. The following year, Stillman expanded into a four-year college and graduated its first baccalaureate class in 1951. The college was accredited by the Southern Association of Colleges and Schools in 1953. Under Hay, seven new buildings were constructed: a gymnasium, a library, an administration-classroom building, two women's residence halls, a prayer chapel, and a student center.

When John Rice became the dean of students at Stillman College in 1966, he lived on campus with his wife, Angelena (née Ray) Rice, and their daughter, Condoleezza Rice, who later served as the 66th United States Secretary of State.

Harold N. Stinson (1967–1980) was the first African American to assume the presidency. Under his dynamic leadership, new programs designed to improve educational quality were instituted, and the physical plant was expanded with the addition of two men's residence halls, faculty apartments, a maintenance building, and a mathematics-science center. Snedecor Hall, Batchelor Building, and Birthright Auditorium were renovated. During his presidency, the college graduated its first non-black student, Constance M. Rizzi, in 1978.

Under the leadership of the college's fourth president, Cordell Wynn (1982–1997), the appearance of the campus improved dramatically; Winsborough and John Knox Halls were renovated; and the Marie Lundy Wynn Hall and Johnson/Robinson Student Health Center were erected. The enrollment grew beyond 1,000 students; the endowment increased significantly; and the educational program was broadened to include the Stillman Management Institute and a community-service component.

On July 1, 1997, Ernest McNealey (1997–2013) was named the fifth president. During his tenure, Stillman garnered national attention in the areas of technology, athletics and scholarly pursuits. One of the leaders in wireless computing, the college received the National Innovation in Technology Award by Apple Computers and continues to be on the cusp of technological innovations in higher education. The college's football program and marching band were revitalized and the college experienced its largest enrollment in the history of the institution. In 2004 the college received its first-ever ranking among top-tier schools in U.S. News & World Report. During McNealey's tenure, four new structures were erected (School of Education building, Wynn Fine Arts Center, Roulhac Residence Hall, and the stadium with accompanying playing fields, buildings, and an NCAA regulation track). The sense of place was further manifested in the construction of the Thomas E. Lyle Band Center and NCAA regulation tennis complex.

On June 26, 2014, at a press conference in Birthright Alumni Hall, Stillman Board of Trustees named interim president Peter E. Millet the sixth president of the school. In August 2014, Stillman was awarded a donation of $2 million by an unknown donor to help with the long term stability of the college. On December 29, 2014, President Peter E. Millet announced via school email that tuition for the small liberal arts school would be reduced from $22,500 to $17,500 in an effort to boost enrollment and make college more affordable. On January 1, 2015, Stillman became a smoke-free campus in an effort to keep with its theme of promoting a healthier lifestyle. In December 2015, Stillman cut its current sports from 12 to 2. Currently, Stillman has six intercollegiate sports teams, Men's and Women's Basketball, Baseball, Men's and Women's Bowling, Softball, Men's and Women's Track and Field, and Volleyball.

On December 14, 2016, the Stillman College Board of Trustees announced the appointment of Cynthia Warrick as the new Interim President for Stillman College. She took office on January 3, 2017. On April 24, 2017, Cynthia Warrick (2017–2023) was named the seventh president and the first female president of Stillman College. On July 1, 2023, Yolanda Page was named the 8th president and the second female president of Stillman College.

The school's Tuscaloosa campus was listed on the National Register of Historic Places in 2021.

== Athletics ==
The Stillman athletic teams are called the Tigers and Lady Tigers. The college is a member of the Division I level of the National Association of Intercollegiate Athletics (NAIA), primarily competing in the HBCU Athletic Conference since the 2024–2025 academic year. The Tigers and Lady Tigers previously competed in the Southern States Athletic Conference (SSAC; formerly known as Georgia–Alabama–Carolina Conference (GACC) until after the 2003–04 school year) from the 2018–19 academic year to the 2023–24 academic year. The Tigers and Lady Tigers also previously competed as a member of the Southern Intercollegiate Athletic Conference (SIAC) from 1978–79 to 1998–99, and again from 2002–03 to 2015–16, which is currently an NCAA Division II athletic conference; as a member of the Great South Athletic Conference (GSAC) of the NCAA Division III ranks from 1999–2000 to 2001–02; and as an NAIA Independent within the Association of Independent Institutions (AII) from 2016–17 to 2017–18.

Stillman currently competes in eight intercollegiate varsity sports: Men's sports include baseball, basketball, cross country and track & field; while women's sports include basketball, cross country, softball and track & field. Stillman formerly sponsored football from the 1999 fall season until the 2015 fall season, when the school eliminated all athletic teams, except for men's and women's basketball, due to increased costs associated with the athletic program.

In fall 2018, the college added men's and women's cross country and track and field. Stillman plans to bring back volleyball in the fall of 2022 and add women's bowling in the fall of 2023.

=== Accomplishments ===
Recent Athletic accomplishments include:

- Men's Basketball – In 2018 the Men's Basketball Team was the NAIA A.I.I Conference Champs. Losing in the opening round of the National Tournament, the men finished the season with a record of 27–5, losing only one game at home. The Tigers swept the conference awards with the Coach of the Year, Defensive Player of the Year, Newcomer of the Year, and a first Team Honorable mention. 2006 and 2016 SIAC Championship; In the 2009–10 season, 1 year removed from taking over a 1–27 team, head coach Michael Grant led the men's basketball team to the school's first ever appearance in the National Top 25 rankings.
- Women's Basketball – In 2018, the Lady Tigers were the NAIA A.I.I. Conference Champ Runner Ups. The Lady Tigers lost in the opening round of the National Tournament and finished with a 19–12 record.
- Baseball – SIAC Tournament champions: 2007, 2008, 2009, 2011, 2012, 2013, 2014; SIAC West Division champions: 2015, 2016; 2007 Division II National Championship
- Softball – The 2018 Lady Tigers Softball team finished with a record of 18–18, an impressive record considering the installation of a new coach in December and a 0–8 start to the season.

== Notable alumni ==
| Name | Class year | Notability | References |
|---|---|---|---|
| Teddy Keaton | 1999 | College football coach | |
| Jeff Henderson | 2012 | Olympic Gold Medalist - Long Jump (2016) | |
| Junior Galette | 2010 | Professional football player | |
| Sammie Lee Hill | 2009 | Professional football player | |
| Brian Witherspoon | 2008 | Professional football player | |
| Gilbert Johnson | 1922 | One of the first African Americans to enlist in the United States Marine Corps; Sergeant Major | |
| Ruth Bolden | 1952 | Civil rights worker and library founder in west Tuscaloosa. | |
| Trudier Harris | 1969 | First tenured African-American faculty member at the College of William and Mary; Distinguished Research Professor of English at the University of Alabama; author of nearly two dozen books. | |
| Michael Figures | 1969 | Alabama State Senator from 1978-1996; one of the first three African-Americans to earn his Juris Doctor from the University of Alabama School of Law | |
| Willie Williams | 1974 | One of the first African Americans to achieve three star rank in the United States Marine Corps; Lieutenant General | |
| Dwayne Murray | | 1st Black fire chief, City of Daytona Beach, FL | |
| Lena Prewitt | | The first Black female professor at the University of Alabama. Worked with Wernher von Braun on the Saturn V project. | |

== Notable faculty ==
- Presbyterian clergyman Andrew Flinn Dickson, the first professor of the Institute for the Training of Colored Ministers in October 1876
- Michael Hill taught British history at Stillman before and during his founding of the League of the South, a neo-Confederate and white supremacist organization.
- Yolanda W. Page, eighth president of Stillman, provost of Savannah State University from 2022 to 2023
- John Wesley Rice Jr. dean of students from 1965 to 1968; father of Condoleezza Rice.
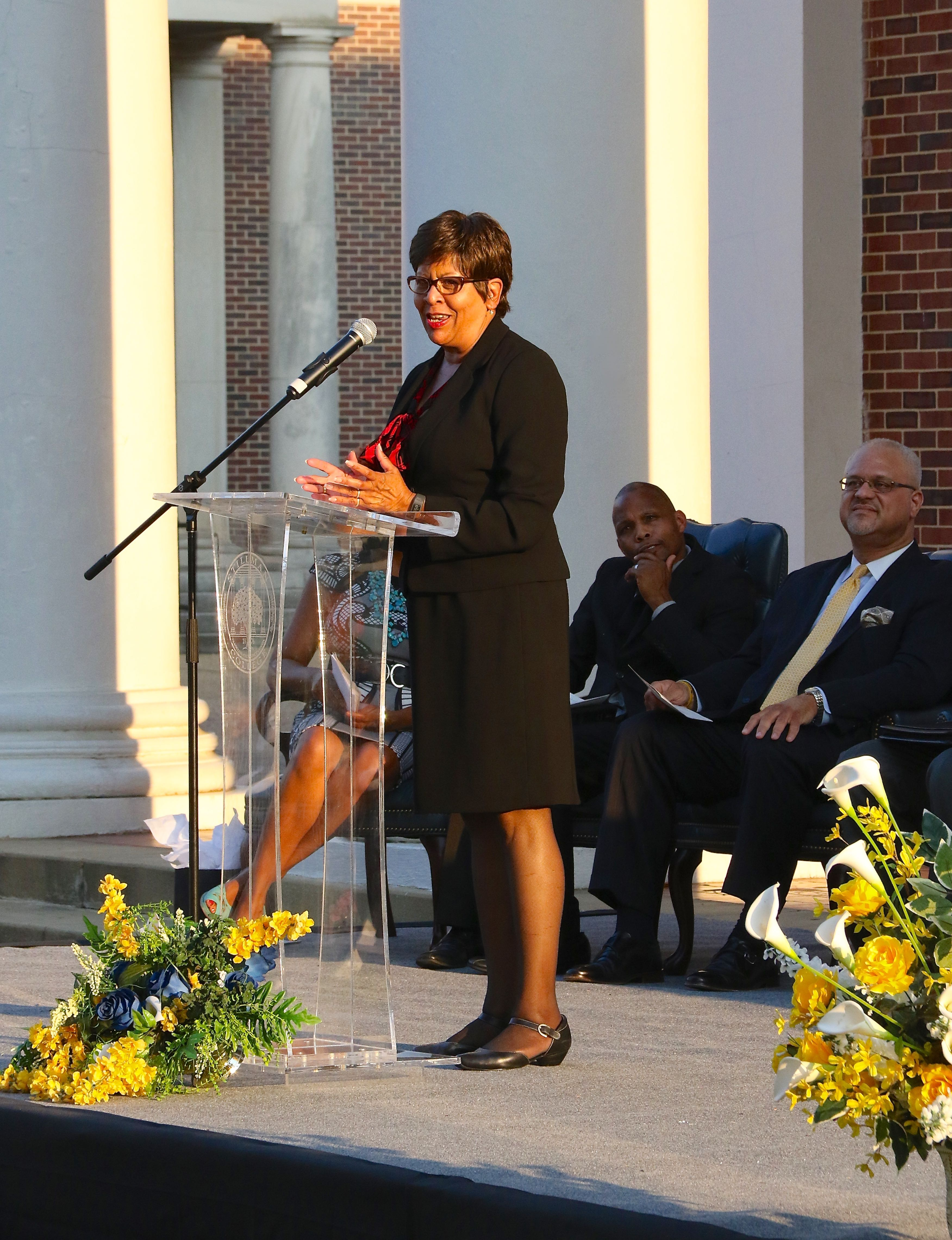
Cynthia Warrick at SGA Installation in September 2018

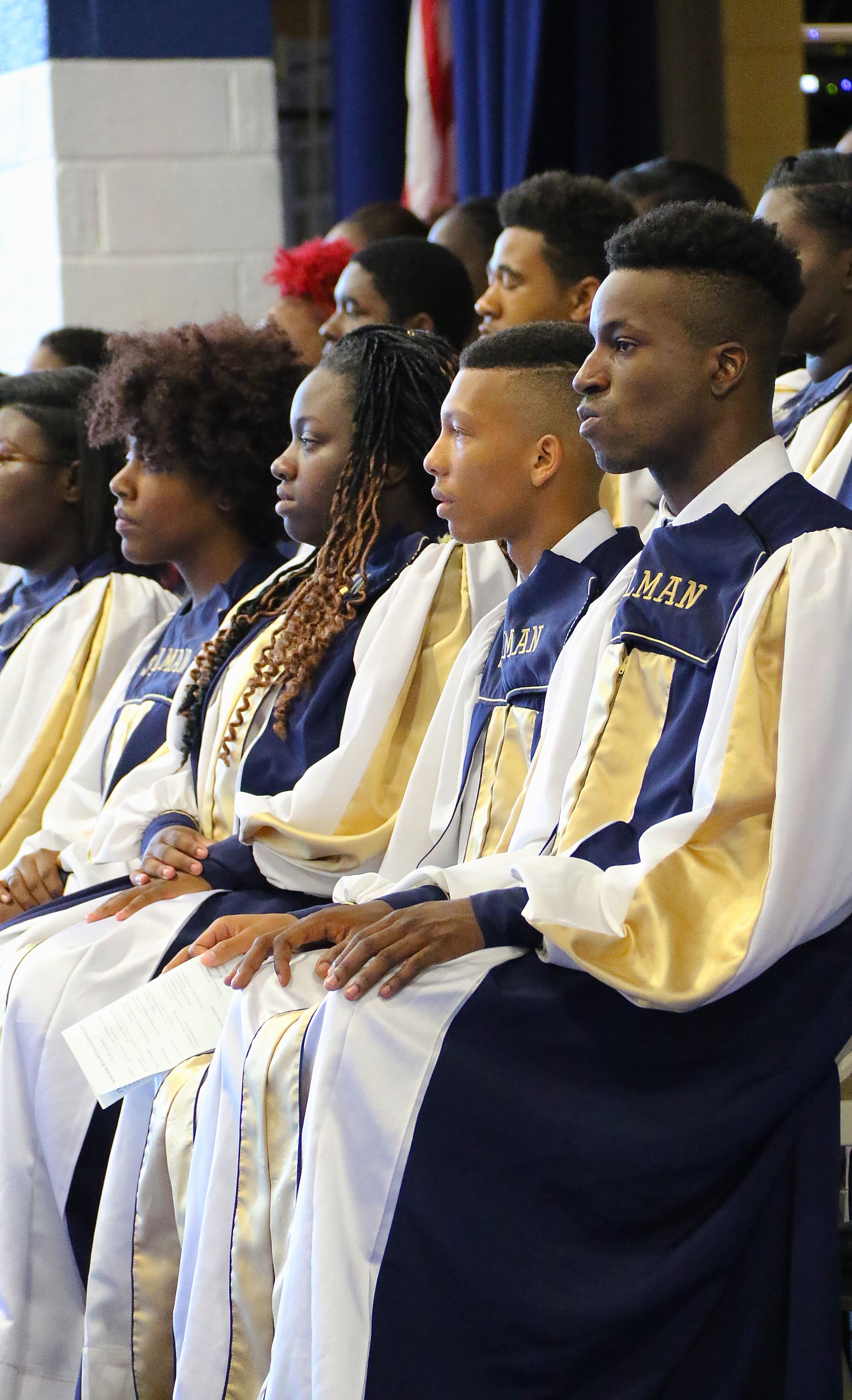
Stillman College Choir at Convocation

== See also ==
- List of historically black colleges and universities
