= 1988 Louisiana Tech Bulldogs football team =

American college football season

1988 Louisiana Tech Bulldogs football
- Conference: Independent
- Record: 4–7
- Head coach: Joe Raymond Peace (1st season)
- Offensive coordinator: Steve Ensminger (1st season)
- Captains: Eldonta Osborne; David Perez
- Home stadium: Joe Aillet Stadium

1988 NCAA Division I-AA independents football standings
	Conf.			Overall
Team	W	L	T	W		L		T
No. 2 Georgia Southern ^		–		10	–	2	–	0
No. 13 Western Kentucky ^		–		9	–	4	–	0
Liberty		–		8	–	3	–	0
Nicholls State		–		7	–	4	–	0
William & Mary		–		6	–	4	–	1
Towson State		–		5	–	5	–	0
Arkansas State		–		5	–	6	–	0
James Madison		–		5	–	6	–	0
Louisiana Tech		–		4	–	7	–	0
Northeastern		–		4	–	7	–	0
Youngstown State		–		4	–	7	–	0
Lamar		–		3	–	8	–	0
^ – NCAA Division I-AA playoff participant; Rankings from NCAA Division I-AA Football Committee poll

The 1988 Louisiana Tech Bulldogs football team was an American football team that represented Louisiana Tech University as an I-AA independent during the 1988 NCAA Division I-AA football season. In their first year under head coach Joe Raymond Peace, the team compiled an 4–7 record.

== Schedule ==
Date	Opponent	Site	Result	Attendance	Source
September 3	at Mississippi State	Scott Field; Starkville, MS	L 14–21	28,747	
September 10	Houston	Independence Stadium; Shreveport, LA	L 0–60	18,222	
September 17	at Wyoming	War Memorial Stadium; Laramie, WY	L 6–38	18,128	
September 24	Nicholls State	Joe Aillet Stadium; Ruston, LA	W 31–10	18,339	
October 1	at Kansas State	KSU Stadium; Manhattan, KS	W 31–28	24,000	
October 8	Southwestern Louisiana	Joe Aillet Stadium; Ruston, LA (rivalry)	W 19–16	18,615	
October 22	at No. 7 Florida State	Doak Campbell Stadium; Tallahassee, FL	L 3–66	51,703	
October 29	Arkansas State	Joe Aillet Stadium; Ruston, LA	L 22–31	15,875	
November 5	at Texas A&M	Kyle Field; College Station, TX	L 17–56	48,023	
November 12	Southern Miss	Joe Aillet Stadium; Ruston, LA (Rivalry in Dixie)	L 19–26	7,500	
November 19	at Northeast Louisiana	Malone Stadium; Monroe, LA (rivalry)	W 23–0	17,500	
Rankings from NCAA Division I-AA Football Committee Poll released prior to the game
