= 1988 North Carolina A&T Aggies football team =

American college football season

1988 North Carolina A&T Aggies football
- Conference: Mid-Eastern Athletic Conference
- Record: 2–9 (2–4 MEAC)
- Head coach: Bill Hayes (1st season)
- Home stadium: Aggie Stadium

1988 Mid-Eastern Athletic Conference football standings
	Conf.					Overall
Team	W		L		T	W		L		T
Bethune–Cookman $	4	–	2	–	0	5	–	6	–	0
No. 18 Florida A&M	4	–	2	–	0	6	–	4	–	1
Delaware State	4	–	2	–	0	5	–	5	–	0
Howard	3	–	3	–	0	7	–	4	–	0
South Carolina State	3	–	3	–	0	4	–	7	–	0
North Carolina A&T	2	–	4	–	0	2	–	9	–	0
Morgan State	0	–	6	–	0	1	–	10	–	0
$ – Conference champion; Both Delaware State and Florida A&M received forfeit losses for the same game. Bethune–Cookman was awarded the conference title, although the MEAC website lists Bethune, Delaware State, and Florida A&M as co-champions.; Rankings from NCAA Division I-AA Football Committee poll

The 1988 North Carolina A&T Aggies football team represented North Carolina A&T State University as a member of the Mid-Eastern Athletic Conference (MEAC) during the 1988 NCAA Division I-AA football season. Led by first-year head coach Bill Hayes, the Aggies compiled an overall record of 2–9, with a mark of 2–4 in conference play, and finished tied for fifth in the MEAC.

== Schedule ==
Date	Opponent	Site	Result	Attendance	Source
September 3	at North Carolina Central*	O'Kelly Stadium; Durham, NC (rivalry)	L 2–15		
September 10	Winston-Salem State*	Aggie Stadium; Greensboro, NC (rivalry)	L 6–26	16,800	
September 17	South Carolina State	Aggie Stadium; Greensboro, NC (rivalry)	W 17–6		
September 24	at Morgan State	Hughes Stadium; Baltimore, MD	W 38–21		
October 1	at Norfolk State*	Foreman Field; Norfolk, VA	L 6–30		
October 8	vs. Florida A&M	Miami Orange Bowl; Miami, FL (Orange Blossom Classic)	L 7–58	24,051	
October 15	Western Carolina*	Aggie Stadium; Greensboro, NC	L 10–45	4,875	
October 22	at Howard	William H. Greene Stadium; Washington, DC	L 8–37		
October 29	Bethune–Cookman	Aggie Stadium; Greensboro, NC	L 10–38	20,500	
November 5	Delaware State	Aggie Stadium; Greensboro, NC	L 7–37	3,500	
November 19	at No. 16 Western Kentucky*	L. T. Smith Stadium; Bowling Green, KY	L 0–44	2,500	
*Non-conference game; Rankings from NCAA Division I-AA Football Committee Poll released prior to the game
