= 1988 Youngstown State Penguins football team =

American college football season

1988 Youngstown State Penguins football
- Conference: Independent
- Record: 4–7
- Head coach: Jim Tressel (3rd season)
- Home stadium: Stambaugh Stadium

1988 NCAA Division I-AA independents football standings
	Conf.			Overall
Team	W	L	T	W		L		T
No. 2 Georgia Southern ^		–		10	–	2	–	0
No. 13 Western Kentucky ^		–		9	–	4	–	0
Liberty		–		8	–	3	–	0
Nicholls State		–		7	–	4	–	0
William & Mary		–		6	–	4	–	1
Towson State		–		5	–	5	–	0
Arkansas State		–		5	–	6	–	0
James Madison		–		5	–	6	–	0
Louisiana Tech		–		4	–	7	–	0
Northeastern		–		4	–	7	–	0
Youngstown State		–		4	–	7	–	0
Lamar		–		3	–	8	–	0
^ – NCAA Division I-AA playoff participant; Rankings from NCAA Division I-AA Football Committee poll

The 1988 Youngstown State Penguins football team represented Youngstown State University as an independent during the 1988 NCAA Division I-AA football season. Led by third-year head coach Jim Tressel, the Penguins compiled an overall record of 4–7.

== Schedule ==
Date	Opponent	Site	Result	Attendance	Source
September 3	at Kent State	Dix Stadium; Kent, OH	L 3–34	13,500	
September 10	Eastern Michigan	Stambaugh Stadium; Youngstown, OH	L 12–17	7,841	
September 24	at No. T–13 Eastern Illinois	O'Brien Stadium; Charleston, IL	W 33–13	5,812	
October 1	Akron	Stambaugh Stadium; Youngstown, OH (Steel Tire)	L 7–33	13,231	
October 8	at Northeastern	Parsons Field; Brookline, MA	L 7–23		
October 15	Towson State	Stambaugh Stadium; Youngstown, OH	W 41–39	6,000	
October 22	at Bowling Green	Doyt Perry Stadium; Bowling Green, OH	L 16–20	7,010	
October 29	at Liberty	City Stadium; Lynchburg, VA	L 0–29	4,250	
November 5	Indiana State	Stambaugh Stadium; Youngstown, OH	W 25–7	1,200	
November 12	Southern Illinois	Stambaugh Stadium; Youngstown, OH	W 31–14	5,533	
November 19	No. 7 Marshall	Stambaugh Stadium; Youngstown, OH	L 15–38	6,225	
Rankings from NCAA Division I-AA Football Committee Poll released prior to the game
