= 1988 Illinois State Redbirds football team =

American college football season

1988 Illinois State Redbirds football
- Conference: Gateway Collegiate Athletic Conference
- Record: 1–10 (0–7 GCAC)
- Head coach: Jim Heacock (1st season)
- Home stadium: Hancock Stadium

1988 Gateway Collegiate Athletic Conference football standings
	Conf.					Overall
Team	W		L		T	W		L		T
No. 3 Western Illinois $^	6	–	0	–	0	10	–	2	–	0
Southwest Missouri State	4	–	2	–	0	5	–	5	–	0
Indiana State	4	–	2	–	0	5	–	6	–	0
Northern Iowa	3	–	3	–	0	5	–	6	–	0
Eastern Illinois	2	–	4	–	0	5	–	6	–	0
Southern Illinois	2	–	4	–	0	4	–	7	–	0
Illinois State	0	–	6	–	0	1	–	10	–	0
$ – Conference champion; ^ – NCAA Division I-AA playoff participant; Rankings from NCAA Division I-AA Football Committee poll

The 1988 Illinois State Redbirds football team represented Illinois State University as a member of the Gateway Collegiate Athletic Conference (GCAC) during the 1988 NCAA Division I-AA football season. In their first year under head coach Jim Heacock, the Redbirds compiled an overall record of 1–10, with a mark of 0–7 in conference play, and placed seventh in the GCAC. Illinois State played home games at Hancock Stadium in Normal, Illinois.

== Schedule ==
Date	Opponent	Site	Result	Attendance	Source
September 3	Eastern Illinois	Hancock Stadium; Normal, IL (rivalry)	L 7–16	7,872	
September 10	at Wake Forest*	Groves Stadium; Winston-Salem, NC	L 0–35	20,225	
September 17	at Western Michigan*	Waldo Stadium; Kalamazoo, MI	L 14–44	22,207	
September 24	Southern Illinois	Hancock Stadium; Normal, IL	L 23–24	8,259	
October 1	Missouri–Rolla*^{†}	Hancock Stadium; Normal, IL	W 20–0	9,271	
October 8	at No. 10 Western Kentucky*	L. T. Smith Stadium; Bowling Green, KY	L 16–31	10,200	
October 15	Northern Iowa	Hancock Stadium; Normal, IL	L 7–34	7,709	
October 22	at Indiana State	Memorial Stadium; Terre Haute, IN	L 18–26	12,758	
October 29	at No. 3 Western Illinois	Hanson Field; Macomb, IL	L 10–13	13,833	
November 5	at Arkansas State*	Indian Stadium; Jonesboro, AR	L 10–28		
November 12	Southwest Missouri State	Hancock Stadium; Normal, IL	L 10–21	9,125	
*Non-conference game; ^{†}Homecoming; Rankings from NCAA Division I-AA Football Committee Poll released prior to the game
