= 1988 Rhode Island Rams football team =

American college football season

1988 Rhode Island Rams football
- Conference: Yankee Conference
- Record: 4–7 (3–5 Yankee)
- Head coach: Bob Griffin (13th season)
- Home stadium: Meade Stadium

1988 Yankee Conference football standings
	Conf.					Overall
Team	W		L		T	W		L		T
No. T–10 UMass +^	6	–	2	–	0	8	–	4	–	0
No. 15 Delaware +^	6	–	2	–	0	7	–	5	–	0
Connecticut	4	–	4	–	0	7	–	4	–	0
Maine	4	–	4	–	0	7	–	4	–	0
New Hampshire	4	–	4	–	0	6	–	5	–	0
Villanova	4	–	4	–	0	5	–	5	–	1
Boston University	3	–	5	–	0	4	–	7	–	0
Rhode Island	3	–	5	–	0	3	–	8	–	0
Richmond	2	–	6	–	0	4	–	7	–	0
+ – Conference co-champions; ^ – NCAA Division I-AA playoff participant; Rankings from NCAA Division I-AA Football Committee poll

The 1988 Rhode Island Rams football team was an American football team that represented the University of Rhode Island in the Yankee Conference during the 1988 NCAA Division I-AA football season. In their 13th season under head coach Bob Griffin, the Rams compiled a 4–7 record (3–5 against conference opponents) and tied for seventh place out of nine teams in the conference.

== Schedule ==
Date	Opponent	Site	Result	Attendance	Source
September 3	at No. 1 Holy Cross*	Fitton Field; Worcester, MA	L 7–49	12,441	
September 10	Boston University	Meade Stadium; Kingston, RI	L 16–41	6,782	
September 17	at Delaware	Delaware Stadium; Newark, DE	W 23–17	16,903	
September 24	Brown*	Meade Stadium; Kingston, RI (rivalry)	W 17–10	7,455	
October 1	at Villanova	Villanova Stadium; Villanova, PA	L 14–20	13,400	
October 8	No. T–11 UMass	Meade Stadium; Kingston, RI	L 7–26	5,117	
October 15	at Maine	Alumni Field; Orono, ME	L 14–28	10,014	
October 22	Richmond^{†}	Meade Stadium; Kingston, RI	W 14–10	5,980	
November 5	at Northeastern*	Parsons Field; Brookline, MA	L 19–24	6,712	
November 12	New Hampshire	Meade Stadium; Kingston, RI	L 9–17	3,669	
November 19	at No. 17 Connecticut	Memorial Stadium; Storrs, CT (rivalry)	W 21–19	3,184	
*Non-conference game; ^{†}Homecoming; Rankings from NCAA Division I-AA Football Committee Poll released prior to the game
