= 1988 Morgan State Bears football team =

American college football season

1988 Morgan State Bears football
- Conference: Mid-Eastern Athletic Conference
- Record: 1–10 (0–6 MEAC)
- Head coach: Ed Wyche (1st season)
- Home stadium: Hughes Stadium

1988 Mid-Eastern Athletic Conference football standings
	Conf.					Overall
Team	W		L		T	W		L		T
Bethune–Cookman $	4	–	2	–	0	5	–	6	–	0
No. 18 Florida A&M	4	–	2	–	0	6	–	4	–	1
Delaware State	4	–	2	–	0	5	–	5	–	0
Howard	3	–	3	–	0	7	–	4	–	0
South Carolina State	3	–	3	–	0	4	–	7	–	0
North Carolina A&T	2	–	4	–	0	2	–	9	–	0
Morgan State	0	–	6	–	0	1	–	10	–	0
$ – Conference champion; Both Delaware State and Florida A&M received forfeit losses for the same game. Bethune–Cookman was awarded the conference title, although the MEAC website lists Bethune, Delaware State, and Florida A&M as co-champions.; Rankings from NCAA Division I-AA Football Committee poll

The 1988 Morgan State Bears football team represented Morgan State University as a member of the Mid-Eastern Athletic Conference (MEAC) during the 1988 NCAA Division I-AA football season. Led by first-year head coach Ed Wyche, the Bears compiled an overall record of 1–10, with a mark of 0–6 in conference play, and finished last in the MEAC.

== Schedule ==
Date	Opponent	Site	Result	Attendance	Source
September 3	at Virginia Union*	Hovey Field; Richmond, VA	L 10–20	1,771	
September 10	at Bethune–Cookman	Municipal Stadium; Daytona Beach, FL	L 6–13	6,100	
September 17	at Northern Iowa*	UNI-Dome; Cedar Falls, IA	L 14–59	9,607	
September 24	North Carolina A&T	Hughes Stadium; Baltimore, MD	L 21–38		
October 1	vs. Bowie State*	UMBC Stadium; Catonsville, MD (Jiffy Lube Classic)	L 7–10	5,485	
October 8	at South Carolina State	Oliver C. Dawson Stadium; Orangeburg, SC	L 14–51		
October 15	at Florida A&M	Bragg Memorial Stadium; Tallahassee, FL	L 14–35	8,894	
October 22	Delaware State	Hughes Stadium; Baltimore, MD	L 8–21	10,365	
October 29	at Norfolk State*	Foreman Field; Norfolk, VA	L 9–35	23,427	
November 5	Elizabeth City State*	Hughes Stadium; Baltimore, MD	W 21–0	150	
November 12	at Howard	William H. Greene Stadium; Washington, DC (rivalry)	L 13–35	8,167	
*Non-conference game
