= 1988 Boston University Terriers football team =

American college football season

1988 Boston University Terriers football
- Conference: Yankee Conference
- Record: 4–7 (3–5 Yankee)
- Head coach: Chris Palmer (1st season)
- Home stadium: Nickerson Field

1988 Yankee Conference football standings
	Conf.					Overall
Team	W		L		T	W		L		T
No. T–10 UMass +^	6	–	2	–	0	8	–	4	–	0
No. 15 Delaware +^	6	–	2	–	0	7	–	5	–	0
Connecticut	4	–	4	–	0	7	–	4	–	0
Maine	4	–	4	–	0	7	–	4	–	0
New Hampshire	4	–	4	–	0	6	–	5	–	0
Villanova	4	–	4	–	0	5	–	5	–	1
Boston University	3	–	5	–	0	4	–	7	–	0
Rhode Island	3	–	5	–	0	3	–	8	–	0
Richmond	2	–	6	–	0	4	–	7	–	0
+ – Conference co-champions; ^ – NCAA Division I-AA playoff participant; Rankings from NCAA Division I-AA Football Committee poll

The 1988 Boston University Terriers football team was an American football team that represented Boston University as a member of the Yankee Conference during the 1988 NCAA Division I-AA football season. In their first season under head coach Chris Palmer, the Terriers compiled a 4–7 record (3–5 against conference opponents), finished in a tie for seventh place in the Yankee Conference, and were outscored by a total of 285 to 230.

== Schedule ==
Date	Opponent	Site	Result	Attendance	Source
September 10	at Rhode Island	Meade Stadium; Kingston, RI	W 41–16	6,782	
September 17	James Madison	Nickerson Field; Boston, MA	L 13–23	5,857	
September 24	Villanova	Nickerson Field; Boston, MA	L 24–31	5,153	
October 1	at UMass	McGuirk Stadium; Hadley, MA	L 27–44	12,840	
October 8	vs. Maine	Fitzpatrick Stadium; Portland, ME	L 10–30	6,400	
October 16	vs. Richmond	(United Kingdom) Crystal Palace National Sports Centre; London, UK (Imperial Bowl)	L 17–20	5,000	
October 22	at The Citadel*	Johnson Hagood Stadium; Charleston, SC	L 13–24	13,123	
October 29	New Hampshire	Nickerson Field; Boston, MA	W 23–21		
November 5	at Harvard*	Harvard Stadium; Boston, MA	W 24–23	6,500	
November 12	No. 9 Connecticut	Nickerson Field; Boston, MA	W 20–15	3,100	
November 19	at Delaware	Delaware Stadium; Newark, DE	L 18–38	14,202	
*Non-conference game; Rankings from NCAA Division I-AA Football Committee Poll released prior to the game
