= 1988 Bethune–Cookman Wildcats football team =

American college football season

1988 Bethune–Cookman Wildcats football

MEAC co-champion
- Conference: Mid-Eastern Athletic Conference
- Record: 5–6 (4–2 MEAC)
- Head coach: Larry Little (6th season)
- Home stadium: Municipal Stadium

1988 Mid-Eastern Athletic Conference football standings
	Conf.					Overall
Team	W		L		T	W		L		T
Bethune–Cookman $	4	–	2	–	0	5	–	6	–	0
No. 18 Florida A&M	4	–	2	–	0	6	–	4	–	1
Delaware State	4	–	2	–	0	5	–	5	–	0
Howard	3	–	3	–	0	7	–	4	–	0
South Carolina State	3	–	3	–	0	4	–	7	–	0
North Carolina A&T	2	–	4	–	0	2	–	9	–	0
Morgan State	0	–	6	–	0	1	–	10	–	0
$ – Conference champion; Both Delaware State and Florida A&M received forfeit losses for the same game. Bethune–Cookman was awarded the conference title, although the MEAC website lists Bethune, Delaware State, and Florida A&M as co-champions.; Rankings from NCAA Division I-AA Football Committee poll

The 1988 Bethune–Cookman Wildcats football team represented Bethune–Cookman College (now known as Bethune–Cookman University) as a member of the Mid-Eastern Athletic Conference (MEAC) during the 1988 NCAA Division I-AA football season. Led by sixth-year head coach Larry Little, the Wildcats compiled an overall record of 5–6, with a mark of 4–2 in conference play, and finished as MEAC co-champion.

== Schedule ==
Date	Opponent	Site	Result	Attendance	Source
September 2	at No. 5 UCF*	Florida Citrus Bowl; Orlando, FL	L 21–29	14,831	
September 10	Morgan State	Municipal Stadium; Daytona Beach, FL	W 13–6	6,100	
September 17	at Howard	William H. Greene Stadium; Washington, D.C.	L 26–41	12,500	
September 24	vs. Grambling State*	Gator Bowl Stadium; Jacksonville, FL	L 16–17	8,600	
October 1	Delaware State	Municipal Stadium; Daytona Beach, FL	W 10–9	4,700	
October 15	South Carolina State	Municipal Stadium; Daytona Beach, FL	L 17–24		
October 22	at No. 6 Georgia Southern*	Paulson Stadium; Statesboro, GA	L 14–38	16,592	
October 29	at North Carolina A&T	Aggie Stadium; Greensboro, NC	W 38–10	20,500	
November 5	Southern*	Municipal Stadium; Daytona Beach, FL	L 13–20		
November 12	Morris Brown*	Municipal Stadium; Daytona Beach, FL	W 48–13	11,200	
November 26	vs. Florida A&M	Tampa Stadium; Tampa, FL (Florida Classic)	W 25–0	50,259	
*Non-conference game; Rankings from NCAA Division I-AA Football Committee Poll released prior to the game
