= 1988 Southern Illinois Salukis football team =

American college football season

1988 Southern Illinois Salukis football
- Conference: Gateway Collegiate Athletic Conference
- Record: 4–7 (2–4 GCAC)
- Head coach: Rick Rhoades (1st season)
- Home stadium: McAndrew Stadium

1988 Gateway Collegiate Athletic Conference football standings
	Conf.					Overall
Team	W		L		T	W		L		T
No. 3 Western Illinois $^	6	–	0	–	0	10	–	2	–	0
Southwest Missouri State	4	–	2	–	0	5	–	5	–	0
Indiana State	4	–	2	–	0	5	–	6	–	0
Northern Iowa	3	–	3	–	0	5	–	6	–	0
Eastern Illinois	2	–	4	–	0	5	–	6	–	0
Southern Illinois	2	–	4	–	0	4	–	7	–	0
Illinois State	0	–	6	–	0	1	–	10	–	0
$ – Conference champion; ^ – NCAA Division I-AA playoff participant; Rankings from NCAA Division I-AA Football Committee poll

The 1988 Southern Illinois Salukis football team was an American football team that represented Southern Illinois University (now known as Southern Illinois University Carbondale) in the Gateway Collegiate Athletic Conference (GCAC) during the 1988 NCAA Division I-AA football season. Under first-year head coach Rick Rhoades, the team compiled a 4–7 record (2–4 against conference opponents) and tied for fifth place in the conference. The team played its home games at McAndrew Stadium in Carbondale, Illinois.

== Schedule ==
Date	Opponent	Site	Result	Attendance	Source
September 3	at No. 12 Western Illinois	Hanson Field; Macomb, IL	L 13–17	9,226	
September 17	Murray State*	McAndrew Stadium; Carbondale, IL	W 28–21	12,000	
September 24	at Illinois State	Hancock Stadium; Normal, IL	W 24–23	8,259	
October 1	Arkansas State*	McAndrew Stadium; Carbondale, IL	W 45–43	9,700	
October 8	at Eastern Illinois	O'Brien Field; Charleston, IL	L 3–34	9,415	
October 15	Indiana State	McAndrew Stadium; Carbondale, IL	W 10–7	11,200	
October 22	Northern Illinois*	McAndrew Stadium; Carbondale, IL	L 9–10	13,000	
October 29	at Kentucky*	Commonwealth Stadium; Lexington, KY	L 10–24	50,093	
November 5	at Southwest Missouri State	Briggs Stadium; Springfield, MO	L 24–28	3,030	
November 12	at Youngstown State*	Stambaugh Stadium; Youngstown, OH	L 14–31	5,533	
November 19	Northern Iowa	McAndrew Stadium; Carbondale, IL	L 21–24	2,500	
*Non-conference game; Rankings from NCAA Division I-AA Football Committee Poll released prior to the game
