= 1988 South Carolina State Bulldogs football team =

American college football season

1988 South Carolina State Bulldogs football
- Conference: Mid-Eastern Athletic Conference
- Record: 5–6 (3–3 MEAC)
- Head coach: Dennis Thomas (3rd season)
- Home stadium: Oliver C. Dawson Stadium

1988 Mid-Eastern Athletic Conference football standings
	Conf.					Overall
Team	W		L		T	W		L		T
Bethune–Cookman $	4	–	2	–	0	5	–	6	–	0
No. 18 Florida A&M	4	–	2	–	0	6	–	4	–	1
Delaware State	4	–	2	–	0	5	–	5	–	0
Howard	3	–	3	–	0	7	–	4	–	0
South Carolina State	3	–	3	–	0	4	–	7	–	0
North Carolina A&T	2	–	4	–	0	2	–	9	–	0
Morgan State	0	–	6	–	0	1	–	10	–	0
$ – Conference champion; Both Delaware State and Florida A&M received forfeit losses for the same game. Bethune–Cookman was awarded the conference title, although the MEAC website lists Bethune, Delaware State, and Florida A&M as co-champions.; Rankings from NCAA Division I-AA Football Committee poll

The 1988 South Carolina State Bulldogs football team represented South Carolina State College (now known as South Carolina State University) as a member of the Mid-Eastern Athletic Conference (MEAC) during the 1988 NCAA Division I-AA football season. Led by third-year head coach Dennis Thomas, the Bulldogs compiled an overall record of 5–6, with a mark of 3–3 in conference play, and finished tied for fourth in the MEAC.

== Schedule ==
Date	Opponent	Site	Result	Attendance	Source
September 3	at Furman*	Paladin Stadium; Greenville, SC	L 0–38	13,837	
September 17	at North Carolina A&T	Aggie Stadium; Greensboro, NC (rivalry)	L 6–17		
September 24	Howard	Oliver C. Dawson Stadium; Orangeburg, SC	W 21–13	18,243	
October 1	Elizabeth City State*	Oliver C. Dawson Stadium; Orangeburg, SC	W 33–0		
October 8	Morgan State	Oliver C. Dawson Stadium; Orangeburg, SC	W 51–14		
October 15	at Bethune–Cookman	Municipal Stadium; Daytona Beach, FL	W 24–17		
October 22	at Florida A&M	Bragg Memorial Stadium; Tallahassee, FL	W 14–23 (forfeit win)		
October 29	at Delaware State	Alumni Stadium; Dover, DE	L 7–28	7,800	
November 5	Virginia Union*	Oliver C. Dawson Stadium; Orangeburg, SC	L 6–29	18,457	
November 10	Grambling State*	Oliver C. Dawson Stadium; Orangeburg, SC	L 16–45	11,158	
November 19	at No. 3 Georgia Southern*	Paulson Stadium; Statesboro, GA	L 0–53	17,034	
*Non-conference game; Rankings from NCAA Division I-AA Football Committee Poll released prior to the game
