= Joe Raymond Peace =

American football player and coach (born 1945)

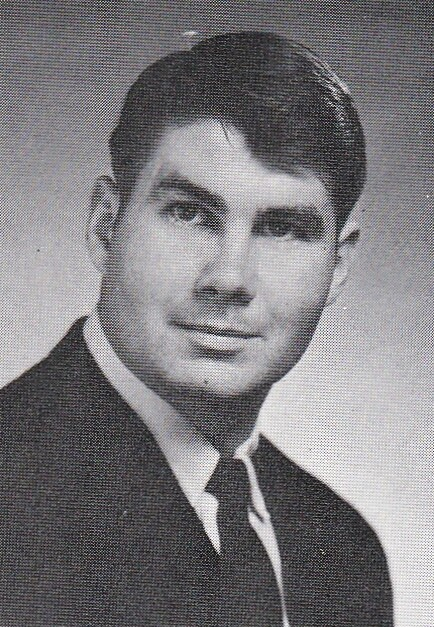
- Peace, 1966

Biographical details
- Born: June 5, 1945 (age 81)

Playing career
- 1964–1967: Louisiana Tech
- Position: Linebacker

Coaching career (HC unless noted)
- 1974–1982: Northwestern State (assistant)
- 1983–1987: Louisiana Tech (assistant)
- 1988–1995: Louisiana Tech

Head coaching record
- Overall: 40–44–4
- Bowls: 0–0–1

Joe Raymond Peace Jr. (born June 5, 1945) is an American former college football coach. He served as head football coach at Louisiana Tech University from 1988 to 1995, compiling a record of 40–44–4.

== Head coaching record ==
Year	Team	Overall	Conference	Standing	Bowl/playoffs
Louisiana Tech Bulldogs (NCAA Division I-AA independent) (1988)
1988	Louisiana Tech	4–7			
Louisiana Tech Bulldogs (NCAA Division I-A independent) (1989–1992)
1989	Louisiana Tech	5–4–1			
1990	Louisiana Tech	8–3–1			T Independence
1991	Louisiana Tech	8–1–2			
1992	Louisiana Tech	5–6			
Louisiana Tech Bulldogs (Big West Conference) (1993–1995)
1993	Louisiana Tech	3–8	2–4	T–6th	
1994	Louisiana Tech	3–8	1–5	9th	
1995	Louisiana Tech	5–6	2–4	T–8th	
Louisiana Tech:		40–44–4			
Total:		40–44–4			
