= 1988 Lamar Cardinals football team =

American college football season

1988 Lamar Cardinals football
- Conference: Independent
- Record: 3–8
- Head coach: Ray Alborn (3rd season)
- Home stadium: Cardinal Stadium

1988 NCAA Division I-AA independents football standings
	Conf.			Overall
Team	W	L	T	W		L		T
No. 2 Georgia Southern ^		–		10	–	2	–	0
No. 13 Western Kentucky ^		–		9	–	4	–	0
Liberty		–		8	–	3	–	0
Nicholls State		–		7	–	4	–	0
William & Mary		–		6	–	4	–	1
Towson State		–		5	–	5	–	0
Arkansas State		–		5	–	6	–	0
James Madison		–		5	–	6	–	0
Louisiana Tech		–		4	–	7	–	0
Northeastern		–		4	–	7	–	0
Youngstown State		–		4	–	7	–	0
Lamar		–		3	–	8	–	0
^ – NCAA Division I-AA playoff participant; Rankings from NCAA Division I-AA Football Committee poll

The 1988 Lamar Cardinals football season was the program's second season as an NCAA Division I-AA independent following the move from the Southland Conference to the newly formed non-football American South Conference. The Cardinals ended the season with a 3–8 overall record in the 1988 NCAA Division I-AA football season. The Cardinals played their home games at the on-campus Cardinal Stadium, now named Provost Umphrey Stadium.

== Schedule ==
Date	Opponent	Site	Result	Attendance	Source
September 3	West Texas State	Cardinal Stadium; Beaumont, TX	W 42–21		
September 10	Southwest Texas State	Cardinal Stadium; Beaumont, TX	L 26–27		
September 17	at Stephen F. Austin	Homer Bryce Stadium; Nacogdoches, TX	L 14–26		
October 1	at Arizona State	Sun Devil Stadium; Tempe, AZ	L 13–24	69,922	
October 8	at Sam Houston State	Bowers Stadium; Huntsville, TX	L 14–16	8,520	
October 15	Alcorn State	Cardinal Stadium; Beaumont, TX	W 35–6		
October 22	at Arkansas State	Indian Stadium; Jonesboro, AR	W 21–17	11,444	
October 29	at Northeast Louisiana	Malone Stadium; Monroe, LA	L 3–24		
November 5	No. 7 Mississippi College	Cardinal Stadium; Beaumont, TX	L 14–16		
November 12	at Texas Tech	Jones Stadium; Lubbock, TX	L 28–59	30,319	
November 19	at McNeese State	Cowboy Stadium; Lake Charles, LA (rivalry)	L 17–18		
Rankings from NCAA Division II Football Committee Poll released prior to the game
