= 1988 Liberty Flames football team =

American college football season

1988 Liberty Flames football
- Conference: Independent
- Record: 8–3
- Head coach: Morgan Hout (5th season)
- Home stadium: City Stadium

1988 NCAA Division I-AA independents football standings
| | Conf. | | | Overall |
| Team | W | L | T | W | | L | | T |
|---|---|---|---|---|---|---|---|---|
| No. 2 Georgia Southern ^ | | – | | 10 | – | 2 | – | 0 |
| No. 13 Western Kentucky ^ | | – | | 9 | – | 4 | – | 0 |
| Liberty | | – | | 8 | – | 3 | – | 0 |
| Nicholls State | | – | | 7 | – | 4 | – | 0 |
| William & Mary | | – | | 6 | – | 4 | – | 1 |
| Towson State | | – | | 5 | – | 5 | – | 0 |
| Arkansas State | | – | | 5 | – | 6 | – | 0 |
| James Madison | | – | | 5 | – | 6 | – | 0 |
| Louisiana Tech | | – | | 4 | – | 7 | – | 0 |
| Northeastern | | – | | 4 | – | 7 | – | 0 |
| Youngstown State | | – | | 4 | – | 7 | – | 0 |
| Lamar | | – | | 3 | – | 8 | – | 0 |
^ – NCAA Division I-AA playoff participant; Rankings from NCAA Division I-AA Football Committee poll

The 1988 Liberty Flames football team represented Liberty University as an independent during the 1988 NCAA Division I-AA football season. Led by fifth-year head coach Morgan Hout, the Flames compiled an overall record of 8–3.

== Schedule ==
| Date | Opponent | Site | Result | Attendance | Source |
|---|---|---|---|---|---|
| September 3 | at Edinboro | Sox Harrison Stadium; Edinboro, PA | W 17–7 | 5,006 | |
| September 10 | Tennessee Tech | City Stadium; Lynchburg, VA | W 24–20 | 7,240 | |
| September 17 | at Eastern Illinois | O'Brien Stadium; Charleston, IL | L 27–28 | | |
| September 24 | Morehead State | City Stadium; Lynchburg, VA | W 34–9 | 4,850 | |
| October 1 | at James Madison | JMU Stadium; Harrisonburg, VA | L 28–31 | 9,200 | |
| October 8 | at Elon | Burlington Memorial Stadium; Burlington, NC | W 42–14 | 3,500 | |
| October 22 | No. 2 Western Illinois | City Stadium; Lynchburg, VA | L 35–36 | 11,400 | |
| October 29 | Youngstown State | City Stadium; Lynchburg, VA | W 29–0 | 4,250 | |
| November 5 | UCF | City Stadium; Lynchburg, VA | W 24–7 | 3,530 | |
| November 12 | at Kutztown | University Field; Kutztown, PA | W 36–13 | 1,700 | |
| November 19 | at Towson State | Minnegan Stadium; Towson, MD | W 20–14 | 1,176 | |
Rankings from NCAA Division I-AA Football Committee Poll released prior to the game
