= 1988 Sam Houston State Bearkats football team =

American college football season

1988 Sam Houston State Bearkats football
- Conference: Southland Conference
- Record: 3–8 (0–6 Southland)
- Head coach: Ron Randleman (7th season)
- Home stadium: Bowers Stadium

1988 Southland Conference football standings
	Conf.					Overall
Team	W		L		T	W		L		T
No. 8 Northwestern State $^	6	–	0	–	0	10	–	3	–	0
No. 9 Stephen F. Austin ^	5	–	1	–	0	10	–	3	–	0
No. 10 North Texas ^	4	–	2	–	0	8	–	4	–	0
McNeese State	3	–	3	–	0	6	–	5	–	0
Northeast Louisiana	2	–	4	–	0	5	–	6	–	0
SW Texas State	1	–	5	–	0	4	–	7	–	0
Sam Houston State	0	–	6	–	0	3	–	8	–	0
$ – Conference champion; ^ – NCAA Division I-AA playoff participant; Rankings from NCAA Division I-AA Football Committee poll

The 1988 Sam Houston State Bearkats football team represented Sam Houston State University as a member of the Southland Conference during the 1988 NCAA Division I-AA football season. Led by seventh-year head coach Ron Randleman, the Bearkats compiled an overall record of 3–8 with a mark of 0–6 in conference play, and finished seventh in the Southland.

== Schedule ==
Date	Opponent	Site	Result	Attendance	Source
September 3	Angelo State*	Bowers Stadium; Huntsville, TX	W 20–3		
September 10	at Boise State*	Bronco Stadium; Boise, ID	L 10–14	20,383	
September 18	at Southwestern Louisiana*	Cajun Field; Lafayette, LA	L 8–33	19,500	
October 1	Texas Southern*	Bowers Stadium; Huntsville, TX	W 22–7		
October 8	Lamar*	Bowers Stadium; Huntsville, TX	W 16–14	8,520	
October 15	No. 9 Stephen F. Austin	Bowers Stadium; Huntsville, TX (Battle of the Piney Woods)	L 10–17	13,110	
October 22	No. 1 North Texas	Bowers Stadium; Huntsville, TX	L 3–24	6,220	
October 29	at No. 13 Northwestern State	Harry Turpin Stadium; Natchitoches, LA	L 14–49	9,750	
November 5	at McNeese State	Cowboy Stadium; Lake Charles, LA	L 0–37		
November 12	at Northeast Louisiana	Malone Stadium; Monroe, LA	L 3–17		
November 19	Southwest Texas State	Bowers Stadium; Huntsville, TX (rivalry)	L 3–10		
*Non-conference game; Rankings from NCAA Division I-AA Football Committee Poll released prior to the game
