= 1988 Towson State Tigers football team =

American college football season

1988 Towson State Tigers football
- Conference: Independent
- Record: 5–5
- Head coach: Phil Albert (17th season)
- Home stadium: Minnegan Stadium

1988 NCAA Division I-AA independents football standings
	Conf.			Overall
Team	W	L	T	W		L		T
No. 2 Georgia Southern ^		–		10	–	2	–	0
No. 13 Western Kentucky ^		–		9	–	4	–	0
Liberty		–		8	–	3	–	0
Nicholls State		–		7	–	4	–	0
William & Mary		–		6	–	4	–	1
Towson State		–		5	–	5	–	0
Arkansas State		–		5	–	6	–	0
James Madison		–		5	–	6	–	0
Louisiana Tech		–		4	–	7	–	0
Northeastern		–		4	–	7	–	0
Youngstown State		–		4	–	7	–	0
Lamar		–		3	–	8	–	0
^ – NCAA Division I-AA playoff participant; Rankings from NCAA Division I-AA Football Committee poll

The 1988 Towson State Tigers football team was an American football team that represented Towson State University (now known as Towson University) as an independent during the 1988 NCAA Division I-AA football season. Led by 17th-year head coach Phil Albert, the team compiled a 5–5 record.

== Schedule ==
Date	Opponent	Site	Result	Attendance	Source
September 10	Northeastern	Minnegan Stadium; Towson, MD	W 45–34	2,843	
September 17	at No. 9 IUP	Miller Stadium; Indiana, PA	L 21–24		
September 24	at Delaware State	Alumni Stadium; Dover, DE	W 24–3	3,200	
October 8	at Howard	William H. Greene Stadium; Washington, DC	W 31–28		
October 15	at Youngstown State	Stambaugh Stadium; Youngstown, OH	L 39–41	6,000	
October 22	at Lehigh	Goodman Stadium; Bethlehem, PA	L 22–27	6,000	
October 29	James Madison	Minnegan Stadium; Towson, MD	W 34–6	5,136	
November 5	New Haven	Minnegan Stadium; Towson, MD	W 31–17		
November 12	Maine	Minnegan Stadium; Towson, MD	L 7–44		
November 19	Liberty	Minnegan Stadium; Towson, MD	L 14–20	1,176	
Rankings from NCAA Division II Football Committee Poll released prior to the game
