= 1988 Indiana State Sycamores football team =

American college football season

1988 Indiana State Sycamores football
- Conference: Gateway Collegiate Athletic Conference
- Record: 5–6 (4–2 GCAC)
- Head coach: Dennis Raetz (9th season)
- Home stadium: Memorial Stadium

1988 Gateway Collegiate Athletic Conference football standings
	Conf.					Overall
Team	W		L		T	W		L		T
No. 3 Western Illinois $^	6	–	0	–	0	10	–	2	–	0
Southwest Missouri State	4	–	2	–	0	5	–	5	–	0
Indiana State	4	–	2	–	0	5	–	6	–	0
Northern Iowa	3	–	3	–	0	5	–	6	–	0
Eastern Illinois	2	–	4	–	0	5	–	6	–	0
Southern Illinois	2	–	4	–	0	4	–	7	–	0
Illinois State	0	–	6	–	0	1	–	10	–	0
$ – Conference champion; ^ – NCAA Division I-AA playoff participant; Rankings from NCAA Division I-AA Football Committee poll

The 1988 Indiana State Sycamores football team represented Indiana State University as a member of the Gateway Collegiate Athletic Conference (GCAC) during the 1988 NCAA Division I-AA football season. The team was led by ninth-year head coach Dennis Raetz and played their home games at Memorial Stadium in Terre Haute, Indiana. The Sycamores finished the season with a 5–6 record overall and a 4–2 record in conference play.

== Schedule ==
Date	Opponent	Site	Result	Attendance	Source
September 10	Salem*	Memorial Stadium; Terre Haute, IN	W 38–17		
September 17	at Florida*	Florida Field; Gainesville, FL	L 0–58	70,147	
September 24	No. 4 Western Illinois	Memorial Stadium; Terre Haute, IN	L 21–24	8,034	
October 1	Eastern Illinois	Memorial Stadium; Terre Haute, IN	W 24–12		
October 8	Southwest Missouri State	Memorial Stadium; Terre Haute, IN	W 27–24		
October 15	at Southern Illinois	McAndrew Stadium; Carbondale, IL	L 7–10	11,200	
October 22	Illinois State^{†}	Memorial Stadium; Terre Haute, IN	W 26–18	12,758	
October 29	at Northern Iowa	UNI-Dome; Cedar Falls, IA	W 24–6	14,920	
November 5	at Youngstown State*	Stambaugh Stadium; Youngstown, OH	L 7–25	1,200	
November 12	at Cincinnati*	Nippert Stadium; Cincinnati, OH	L 21–40	6,869	
November 17	vs. Ball State*	Hoosier Dome; Indianapolis, IN (rivalry)	L 10–24	8,140	
*Non-conference game; ^{†}Homecoming; Rankings from NCAA Division I-AA Football Committee Poll released prior to the game
