= 1988 Arkansas State Indians football team =

American college football season

1988 Arkansas State Indians football
- Conference: Independent
- Record: 5–6
- Head coach: Larry Lacewell (10th season)
- Home stadium: Indian Stadium

1988 NCAA Division I-AA independents football standings
	Conf.			Overall
Team	W	L	T	W		L		T
No. 2 Georgia Southern ^		–		10	–	2	–	0
No. 13 Western Kentucky ^		–		9	–	4	–	0
Liberty		–		8	–	3	–	0
Nicholls State		–		7	–	4	–	0
William & Mary		–		6	–	4	–	1
Towson State		–		5	–	5	–	0
Arkansas State		–		5	–	6	–	0
James Madison		–		5	–	6	–	0
Louisiana Tech		–		4	–	7	–	0
Northeastern		–		4	–	7	–	0
Youngstown State		–		4	–	7	–	0
Lamar		–		3	–	8	–	0
^ – NCAA Division I-AA playoff participant; Rankings from NCAA Division I-AA Football Committee poll

The 1988 Arkansas State Indians football team represented Arkansas State University as an independent during the 1988 NCAA Division I-AA football season. Led by tenth-year head coach Larry Lacewell, the Indians finished the season with a record of 5–6.

== Schedule ==
Date	Opponent	Site	Result	Attendance	Source
September 3	Delta State	Indian Stadium; Jonesboro, AR	W 28–15		
September 10	at Memphis State	Liberty Bowl Memorial Stadium; Memphis, TN (rivalry)	L 7–9	28,505	
September 17	at North Texas	Fouts Field; Denton, TX	L 21–49	11,850	
October 24	Northeast Louisiana	Indian Stadium; Jonesboro, AR	L 13–16	14,488	
October 1	at Southern Illinois	McAndrew Stadium; Carbondale, IL	L 43–45	9,700	
October 8	at Akron	Rubber Bowl; Akron, OH	W 13–12	9,463	
October 15	at Ole Miss	Vaught–Hemingway Stadium; Oxford, MS	L 22–25	24,476	
October 22	Lamar	Indian Stadium; Jonesboro, AR	L 17–21	11,444	
October 29	at Louisiana Tech	Joe Aillet Stadium; Ruston, LA	W 31–22	15,875	
November 5	Illinois State^{†}	Indian Stadium; Jonesboro, AR	W 28–10		
November 19	at Southwestern Louisiana	Cajun Field; Lafayette, LA	W 38–21	16,718	
^{†}Homecoming
