= 1988 Southwest Missouri State Bears football team =

American college football season

1988 Southwest Missouri State Bears football
- Conference: Gateway Football Conference
- Record: 5–5 (4–2 GFC)
- Head coach: Jesse Branch (3rd season)
- Defensive coordinator: Dave Wommack (3rd season)
- Captains: Doug Gardner; Scott Hartwig
- Home stadium: Briggs Stadium

1988 Gateway Collegiate Athletic Conference football standings
	Conf.					Overall
Team	W		L		T	W		L		T
No. 3 Western Illinois $^	6	–	0	–	0	10	–	2	–	0
Southwest Missouri State	4	–	2	–	0	5	–	5	–	0
Indiana State	4	–	2	–	0	5	–	6	–	0
Northern Iowa	3	–	3	–	0	5	–	6	–	0
Eastern Illinois	2	–	4	–	0	5	–	6	–	0
Southern Illinois	2	–	4	–	0	4	–	7	–	0
Illinois State	0	–	6	–	0	1	–	10	–	0
$ – Conference champion; ^ – NCAA Division I-AA playoff participant; Rankings from NCAA Division I-AA Football Committee poll

The 1988 Southwest Missouri State Bears football team represented Southwest Missouri State University (now known as Missouri State University) as a member of the Gateway Football Conference (GFC) during the 1988 NCAA Division I-AA football season. Led by third-year head coach Jesse Branch, the Bears compiled an overall record of 5–5, with a mark of 4–2 in conference play, and finished tied for second in the GFC.

== Schedule ==
Date	Time	Opponent	Site	Result	Attendance	Source
September 3		at No. 18 Northwestern State*	Harry Turpin Stadium; Natchitoches, LA	L 8–24		
September 10		Missouri Southern*	Briggs Stadium; Springfield, MO	W 56–12		
September 17		No. 12 Western Illinois	Briggs Stadium; Springfield, MO	L 31–35	7,655	
September 24	7:00 p.m.	at Northern Iowa	UNI-Dome; Cedar Falls, IA	W 28–9	10,734	
October 1	1:00 p.m.	at Northern Illinois*	Huskie Stadium; DeKalb, IL	L 3–17	14,127	
October 8		at Indiana State	Memorial Stadium; Terre Haute, IN	L 24–27		
October 15		at No. 8 Western Kentucky*	Briggs Stadium; Springfield, MO	L 14–21	8,059	
October 29		Eastern Illinois	Briggs Stadium; Springfield, MO	W 41–21		
November 5		Southern Illinois	Briggs Stadium; Springfield, MO	W 28–24	3,030	
November 12		at Illinois State	Hancock Stadium; Normal, IL	W 21–10	9,125	
*Non-conference game; Rankings from NCAA Division I-AA Football Committee Poll released prior to the game; All times are in Central time
