= 1988 Southwest Texas State Bobcats football team =

American college football season

1988 Southwest Texas State Bobcats football
- Conference: Southland Conference
- Record: 4–7 (1–5 SLC)
- Head coach: John O'Hara (6th season)
- Home stadium: Bobcat Stadium

1988 Southland Conference football standings
| | Conf. | | | | | Overall |
| Team | W | | L | | T | W | | L | | T |
|---|---|---|---|---|---|---|---|---|---|---|
| No. 8 Northwestern State $^ | 6 | – | 0 | – | 0 | 10 | – | 3 | – | 0 |
| No. 9 Stephen F. Austin ^ | 5 | – | 1 | – | 0 | 10 | – | 3 | – | 0 |
| No. 10 North Texas ^ | 4 | – | 2 | – | 0 | 8 | – | 4 | – | 0 |
| McNeese State | 3 | – | 3 | – | 0 | 6 | – | 5 | – | 0 |
| Northeast Louisiana | 2 | – | 4 | – | 0 | 5 | – | 6 | – | 0 |
| SW Texas State | 1 | – | 5 | – | 0 | 4 | – | 7 | – | 0 |
| Sam Houston State | 0 | – | 6 | – | 0 | 3 | – | 8 | – | 0 |
$ – Conference champion; ^ – NCAA Division I-AA playoff participant; Rankings from NCAA Division I-AA Football Committee poll

The 1988 Southwest Texas State Bobcats football team was an American football team that represented Southwest Texas State University (now known as Texas State University) during the 1988 NCAA Division I-AA football season as a member of the Southland Conference (SLC). In their sixth year under head coach John O'Hara, the team compiled an overall record of 4–7 with a mark of 1–5 in conference play.

== Schedule ==
| Date | Opponent | Site | Result | Attendance | Source |
|---|---|---|---|---|---|
| September 3 | at Texas A&I* | Javelina Stadium; Kingsville, TX | W 41–28 | 14,500 | |
| September 10 | at Lamar* | Cardinal Stadium; Beaumoont, TX | W 27–26 | | |
| September 17 | at No. 2 Northeast Louisiana | Malone Stadium; Monroe, LA | L 27–29 | 17,833 | |
| September 24 | Stephen F. Austin | Bobcat Stadium; San Marcos, TX | L 10–27 | | |
| October 1 | at Northwestern State | Harry Turpin Stadium; Natchitoches, LA | L 21–49 | | |
| October 8 | at Baylor* | Baylor Stadium; Waco, TX | L 7–45 | 22,473 | |
| October 15 | Texas Southern* | Bobcat Stadium; San Marcos, TX | W 38–7 | 7,417 | |
| October 22 | McNeese State | Bobcat Stadium; San Marcos, TX | L 21–24 | | |
| October 29 | Nicholls State* | Bobcat Stadium; San Marcos, TX (rivalry) | L 10–13 | | |
| November 12 | No. 14 North Texas | Bobcat Stadium; San Marcos, TX | L 10–30 | 6,215 | |
| November 19 | at Sam Houston State | Bowers Stadium; Huntsville, TX (rivalry) | W 10–3 | | |
*Non-conference game; Rankings from NCAA Division I-AA Football Committee Poll released prior to the game
