= 1988 Delaware State Hornets football team =

American college football season

1988 Delaware State Hornets football

MEAC co-champion
- Conference: Mid-Eastern Athletic Conference
- Record: 5–5 (4–2 MEAC)
- Head coach: Bill Collick (4th season)
- Home stadium: Alumni Stadium

1988 Mid-Eastern Athletic Conference football standings
	Conf.					Overall
Team	W		L		T	W		L		T
Bethune–Cookman $	4	–	2	–	0	5	–	6	–	0
No. 18 Florida A&M	4	–	2	–	0	6	–	4	–	1
Delaware State	4	–	2	–	0	5	–	5	–	0
Howard	3	–	3	–	0	7	–	4	–	0
South Carolina State	3	–	3	–	0	4	–	7	–	0
North Carolina A&T	2	–	4	–	0	2	–	9	–	0
Morgan State	0	–	6	–	0	1	–	10	–	0
$ – Conference champion; Both Delaware State and Florida A&M received forfeit losses for the same game. Bethune–Cookman was awarded the conference title, although the MEAC website lists Bethune, Delaware State, and Florida A&M as co-champions.; Rankings from NCAA Division I-AA Football Committee poll

The 1988 Delaware State Hornets football team represented Delaware State College (now known as Delaware State University) as a member of the Mid-Eastern Athletic Conference (MEAC) during the 1988 NCAA Division I-AA football season. Led by fourth-year head coach Bill Collick, the Hornets compiled an overall record of 5–5, with a mark of 4–2 in conference play, and finished as MEAC co-champion.

== Schedule ==
Date	Opponent	Site	Result	Attendance	Source
September 3	Florida A&M	Alumni Stadium; Dover, DE	L 31–35	7,500	
September 10	at No. T–3 Eastern Kentucky*	Hanger Field; Richmond, KY	L 7–48	21,700	
September 24	Towson State*	Alumni Stadium; Dover, DE	L 3–24	3,200	
October 1	at Bethune–Cookman	Municipal Stadium; Daytona Beach, FL	L 9–10	4,700	
October 15	Arkansas–Pine Bluff*	Alumni Stadium; Dover, DE	W 58–7	3,205	
October 22	at Morgan State	Hughes Stadium; Baltimore, MD	W 21–8	10,365	
October 29	South Carolina State^{†}	Alumni Stadium; Dover, DE	W 28–7	7,800	
November 5	at North Carolina A&T	Aggie Stadium; Greensboro, NC	W 37–7	3,500	
November 12	No. 4 Western Illinois*	Alumni Stadium; Dover, DE	L 13–22	3,000	
November 19	at Howard	William H. Greene Stadium; Washington, D.C.	W 28–21	3,857	
*Non-conference game; ^{†}Homecoming; Rankings from NCAA Division I-AA Football Committee Poll released prior to the game
