= 1988 Northeastern Huskies football team =

American college football season

1988 Northeastern Huskies football
- Conference: Independent
- Record: 4–7
- Head coach: Paul Pawlak (8th season)
- Home stadium: Parsons Field

1988 NCAA Division I-AA independents football standings
| | Conf. | | | Overall |
| Team | W | L | T | W | | L | | T |
|---|---|---|---|---|---|---|---|---|
| No. 2 Georgia Southern ^ | | – | | 10 | – | 2 | – | 0 |
| No. 13 Western Kentucky ^ | | – | | 9 | – | 4 | – | 0 |
| Liberty | | – | | 8 | – | 3 | – | 0 |
| Nicholls State | | – | | 7 | – | 4 | – | 0 |
| William & Mary | | – | | 6 | – | 4 | – | 1 |
| Towson State | | – | | 5 | – | 5 | – | 0 |
| Arkansas State | | – | | 5 | – | 6 | – | 0 |
| James Madison | | – | | 5 | – | 6 | – | 0 |
| Louisiana Tech | | – | | 4 | – | 7 | – | 0 |
| Northeastern | | – | | 4 | – | 7 | – | 0 |
| Youngstown State | | – | | 4 | – | 7 | – | 0 |
| Lamar | | – | | 3 | – | 8 | – | 0 |
^ – NCAA Division I-AA playoff participant; Rankings from NCAA Division I-AA Football Committee poll

The 1988 Northeastern Huskies football team was an American football team that represented Northeastern University as an independent during the 1988 NCAA Division I-AA football season. Led by eighth-year head coach Paul Pawlak, the team compiled a 4–7 record.

== Schedule ==
| Date | Opponent | Site | Result | Attendance | Source |
|---|---|---|---|---|---|
| September 10 | at Towson State | Minnegan Stadium; Towson, MD | L 34–45 | 2,843 | |
| September 17 | at No. 14 Maine | Alumni Field; Orono, ME | L 20–43 | 9,122 | |
| September 24 | Central Connecticut State | Parsons Field; Brookline, MA | W 52–7 | 4,500 | |
| October 1 | No. 16 Connecticut | Parsons Field; Brookline, MA | L 24–25 | | |
| October 8 | Youngstown State | Parsons Field; Brookline, MA | W 23–7 | | |
| October 15 | James Madison | Parsons Field; Brookline, MA | L 13–29 | 2,300 | |
| October 22 | at New Hampshire | Cowell Stadium; Durham, NH | L 10–15 | 1,216 | |
| October 29 | at UMass | McGuirk Stadium; Hadley, MA | L 6–21 | 7,240 | |
| November 5 | Rhode Island | Parsons Field; Brookline, MA | W 24–19 | 6,712 | |
| November 12 | Lehigh | Parsons Field; Brookline, MA | W 33–26 | 3,512 | |
| November 19 | at Holy Cross | Fitton Field; Worcester, MA | L 30–52 | 7,881 | |
Rankings from NCAA Division I-AA Football Committee Poll released prior to the game
