= Dal Shealy =

American football player and coach (born 1938)

Biographical details
- Born: August 1, 1938 (age 88)

Playing career

Football
- c. 1957: Carson–Newman
- Position: Guard

Coaching career (HC unless noted)

Football
- 1962–1964: Laurens HS (SC)
- 1965: Mars Hill (ends)
- 1969: Mars Hill
- 1970–1973: Carson–Newman
- 1974–1975: Baylor (AHC/backfield)
- 1976: Tennessee (backfield)
- 1977–1978: Auburn (assistant)
- 1979: Iowa State (OC)
- 1980–1988: Richmond

Track and field
- 1965–1966: Mars Hill

Head coaching record
- Overall: 79–74 (college football)
- Bowls: 1–0
- Tournaments: 0–1–1 (NAIA D-I playoffs); 1–2 (NCAA D-I-AA playoffs)

Accomplishments and honors

Championships
- 1 Yankee (1987)

Dal Shealy (born August 1, 1938) is an American former football player and coach. He served as the head coach at Mars Hill College—now known as Mars Hill University—in 1969, Carson–Newman College—now known as Carson–Newman University—from 1970 to 1973, and at the University of Richmond from 1980 to 1988, compiling a career college football record of 79–74. Shealy also served as an assistant coach at Baylor University, the University of Tennessee, Auburn University, and Iowa State University. He grew up in Batesburg, South Carolina, now Batesburg-Leesville, South Carolina and attended Batesburg-Leesville High School and Carson–Newman College—now known as Carson–Newman University. Shealy's son, Vic Shealy, is currently the head football coach at Houston Baptist University.

== Early life and military service ==
Shealy earned a total of 12 varsity letters in three sports (football, baseball and basketball) at Batesburg-Leesville High School in the 1950s. Shealy played on the line for the Panthers in football for coach Gus Allen along with catching for the baseball team. Shealy was a part of the inaugural class of the Batesburg-Leesville (SC) Athletic Hall of Fame in 2009.

Shealy entered the United States Marine Corps and played football with the Quantico Marines, which were National Service Champions. They played in the Leatherneck Bowl and the first Missile Bowl. At Quantico, played with King Dixon, former halfback at the University of South Carolina. Dixon later served as athletic director at South Carolina.

== Coaching career ==
Shealy was the head football coach at Laurens High School in Laurens, South Carolina from 1962 to 1964. In May 1965, he was hired by Mars Hill College—now known as Mars Hill University—in Mars Hill, North Carolina as head track coach, ends coach for the football team, and director of the men's intramural athletics program.

== Life after coaching ==
Shealy left coaching in 1989 to become executive vice president of the Fellowship of Christian Athletes. He was named president in 1992. He retired from the presidency in 2005. Shealy has also written several books including, "One Way To Play: Drug-Free!" and "One Way To Play: A Game Plan for Coaches."

== Head coaching record ==
=== College football ===
Year	Team	Overall	Conference	Standing	Bowl/playoffs
Mars Hill Lions (NAIA independent) (1969)
1969	Mars Hill	6–4			
Mars Hill:		6–4			
Carson–Newman Eagles (NAIA Division I independent) (1970–1973)
1970	Carson–Newman	4–6			
1971	Carson–Newman	10–2			W Share Bowl
1972	Carson–Newman	10–2			L NAIA Division I Championship
1973	Carson–Newman	6–3			
Carson–Newman:		30–13			
Richmond Spiders (NCAA Division I-A independent) (1980–1981)
1980	Richmond	5–6			
1981	Richmond	4–7			
Richmond Spiders (NCAA Division I-AA independent) (1982–1985)
1982	Richmond	0–10			
1983	Richmond	3–8			
1984	Richmond	8–4			L NCAA Division I-AA Quarterfinal
1985	Richmond	8–3			
Richmond Spiders (Yankee Conference) (1986–1988)
1986	Richmond	4–7	3–4	T–5th	
1987	Richmond	7–5	6–1	T–1st	L NCAA Division I-AA First Round
1988	Richmond	4–7	2–6	9th	
Richmond:		43–57	11–11		
Total:		79–74			
National championship Conference title Conference division title or championship game berth
