= 1988 Georgia Southern Eagles football team =

American college football season

1988 Georgia Southern Eagles football

NCAA Division I-AA Championship, L 12–17 vs. Furman
- Conference: Independent
- Record: 12–3
- Head coach: Erk Russell (7th season)
- Offensive coordinator: Tim Stowers (1st season)
- Home stadium: Paulson Stadium

1988 NCAA Division I-AA independents football standings
	Conf.			Overall
Team	W	L	T	W		L		T
No. 2 Georgia Southern ^		–		10	–	2	–	0
No. 13 Western Kentucky ^		–		9	–	4	–	0
Liberty		–		8	–	3	–	0
Nicholls State		–		7	–	4	–	0
William & Mary		–		6	–	4	–	1
Towson State		–		5	–	5	–	0
Arkansas State		–		5	–	6	–	0
James Madison		–		5	–	6	–	0
Louisiana Tech		–		4	–	7	–	0
Northeastern		–		4	–	7	–	0
Youngstown State		–		4	–	7	–	0
Lamar		–		3	–	8	–	0
^ – NCAA Division I-AA playoff participant; Rankings from NCAA Division I-AA Football Committee poll

The 1988 Georgia Southern Eagles football team represented the Georgia Southern Eagles of Georgia Southern College (now known as Georgia Southern University) during the 1988 NCAA Division I-AA football season. The Eagles played their home games at Paulson Stadium in Statesboro, Georgia. The team was coached by Erk Russell, in his seventh year as head coach for the Eagles.

== Schedule ==
Date	Opponent	Rank	Site	TV	Result	Attendance	Source
September 3	Newberry	No. 6	Paulson Stadium; Statesboro, GA		W 55–7	12,084	
September 10	vs. Florida A&M	No. 6	Gator Bowl Stadium; Jacksonville, FL		W 42–14	18,556	
September 17	at Chattanooga	No. 6	Chamberlain Field; Chattanooga, TN		W 13–3	8,717	
September 24	at No. 20 Middle Tennessee	No. T–6	Johnny "Red" Floyd Stadium; Murfreesboro, TN		L 10–26	6,800	
October 8	at No. 6 (I-A) Florida State	No. T–7	Doak Campbell Stadium; Tallahassee, FL		L 10–28	59,109	
October 15	Northeast Louisiana	No. 10	Paulson Stadium; Statesboro, GA		W 43–11	20,228	
October 22	Bethune–Cookman	No. 6	Paulson Stadium; Statesboro, GA		W 38–14	16,592	
October 29	at UCF	No. 6	Florida Citrus Bowl; Orlando, FL		W 31–17	28,682	
November 5	at James Madison	No. 6	JMU Stadium; Harrisonburg, VA		W 27–13	10,126	
November 12	Samford	No. 3	Paulson Stadium; Statesboro, GA		W 49–21	20,340	
November 19	South Carolina State	No. 3	Paulson Stadium; Statesboro, GA		W 53–0	17,034	
November 26	No. 14 The Citadel	No. 2	Paulson Stadium; Statesboro, GA (NCAA Division I-AA First Round)		W 38–20	11,011	
December 3	No. 9 Stephen F. Austin	No. 2	Paulson Stadium; Statesboro, GA (NCAA Division I-AA Quarterfinal)		W 27–6	12,289	
December 10	No. 7 Eastern Kentucky	No. 2	Paulson Stadium; Statesboro, GA (NCAA Division I-AA Semifinal)		W 21–17	14,023	
December 17	vs. No. 4 Furman	No. 2	Holt Arena; Pocatello, ID (NCAA Division I-AA Championship Game)	ESPN	L 12–17	9,714	
Rankings from NCAA Division I-AA Football Committee Poll released prior to the game
