= 1988 Eastern Illinois Panthers football team =

American college football season

1988 Eastern Illinois Panthers football
- Conference: Gateway Collegiate Athletic Conference
- Record: 5–6 (2–4 GCAC)
- Head coach: Bob Spoo (2nd season)
- Offensive coordinator: Kit Cartwright (2nd season)
- Home stadium: O'Brien Stadium

1988 Gateway Collegiate Athletic Conference football standings
	Conf.					Overall
Team	W		L		T	W		L		T
No. 3 Western Illinois $^	6	–	0	–	0	10	–	2	–	0
Southwest Missouri State	4	–	2	–	0	5	–	5	–	0
Indiana State	4	–	2	–	0	5	–	6	–	0
Northern Iowa	3	–	3	–	0	5	–	6	–	0
Eastern Illinois	2	–	4	–	0	5	–	6	–	0
Southern Illinois	2	–	4	–	0	4	–	7	–	0
Illinois State	0	–	6	–	0	1	–	10	–	0
$ – Conference champion; ^ – NCAA Division I-AA playoff participant; Rankings from NCAA Division I-AA Football Committee poll

The 1988 Eastern Illinois Panthers football team represented Eastern Illinois University during the 1988 NCAA Division I-AA football season. The Panthers played their home games at O'Brien Stadium in Charleston, Illinois.

== Schedule ==
Date	Opponent	Rank	Site	Result	Attendance	Source
September 3	at Illinois State		Hancock Stadium; Normal, IL (rivalry)	W 16–7	7,872	
September 10	Austin Peay*		O'Brien Stadium; Charleston, IL	W 44–0		
September 17	Liberty*		O'Brien Stadium; Charleston, IL	W 28–27		
September 24	Youngstown State*	No. T–13	O'Brien Stadium; Charleston, IL	L 13–33	5,812	
October 1	at Indiana State		Memorial Stadium; Terre Haute, IN	L 12–24		
October 8	Southern Illinois		O'Brien Stadium; Charleston, IL	W 34–3	9,415	
October 15	at No. 2 Western Illinois		Hanson Field; Macomb, IL	L 8–45	9,680	
October 22	Northern Iowa		O'Brien Stadium; Charleston, IL	L 15–17	9,677	
October 29	at Southwest Missouri State		Briggs Stadium; Springfield, MO	L 21–41		
November 5	No. 5 Western Kentucky*		O'Brien Stadium; Charleston, IL	W 6–0	10,021	
November 12	No. 15 Boise State*		Bronco Stadium; Boise, ID	L 7–12	12,871	
*Non-conference game; Rankings from NCAA Division I-AA Football Committee Poll released prior to the game
