= 1988 Stephen F. Austin Lumberjacks football team =

American college football season

1988 Stephen F. Austin Lumberjacks football

NCAA Division I-AA Quarterfinal, L 6–27 at Georgia Southern
- Conference: Southland Conference
- Record: 10–3 (5–1 Southland)
- Head coach: Jim Hess (7th season)
- Home stadium: Homer Bryce Stadium

1988 Southland Conference football standings
	Conf.					Overall
Team	W		L		T	W		L		T
No. 8 Northwestern State $^	6	–	0	–	0	10	–	3	–	0
No. 9 Stephen F. Austin ^	5	–	1	–	0	10	–	3	–	0
No. 10 North Texas ^	4	–	2	–	0	8	–	4	–	0
McNeese State	3	–	3	–	0	6	–	5	–	0
Northeast Louisiana	2	–	4	–	0	5	–	6	–	0
SW Texas State	1	–	5	–	0	4	–	7	–	0
Sam Houston State	0	–	6	–	0	3	–	8	–	0
$ – Conference champion; ^ – NCAA Division I-AA playoff participant; Rankings from NCAA Division I-AA Football Committee poll

The 1988 Stephen F. Austin Lumberjacks football team was an American football team that represented Stephen F. Austin State University as a member of the Southland Conference during the 1988 NCAA Division I-AA football season. In their seventh year under head coach Jim Hess, the Lumberjacks compiled an overall record of 10–3 with a mark of 5–1 in conference play, placing second in the Southland. Stephen F. Austin advanced to the NCAA Division I-AA Football Championship playoffs, where the Lumberjaccks defeated Jackson State in the first round, before losing to the eventual national runner-up, Georgia Southern, in the quarterfinals. The team played home games at Homer Bryce Stadium in Nacogdoches, Texas.

== Schedule ==
Date	Opponent	Rank	Site	Result	Attendance	Source
September 3	at Southern Miss*		M. M. Roberts Stadium; Hattiesburg, MS	L 7–21	15,032	
September 10	Prairie View A&M*		Homer Bryce Stadium; Nacogdoches, TX	W 38–3		
September 17	Lamar*		Homer Bryce Stadium; Nacogdoches, TX	W 26–14		
September 24	at Southwest Texas State		Bobcat Stadium; San Marcos, TX	W 27–10		
October 1	at Northeast Louisiana		Malone Stadium; Monroe, LA	W 20–3		
October 15	at Sam Houston State	No. 17	Bowers Stadium; Huntsville, TX (rivalry)	W 17–10	13,110	
October 22	Eastern Washington*	No. 11	Homer Bryce Stadium; Nacogdoches, TX	W 48–10		
October 29	No. 1 North Texas	No. 9	Homer Bryce Stadium; Nacogdoches, TX	W 17–10	13,911	
November 5	Nicholls State*	No. 3	Homer Bryce Stadium; Nacogdoches, TX	W 30–7		
November 12	McNeese State	No. 1	Homer Bryce Stadium; Nacogdoches, TX	W 20–3		
November 19	No. 10 Northwestern State	No. 1	Homer Bryce Stadium; Nacogdoches, TX (rivalry)	L 17–20		
November 26	No. 5 Jackson State*	No. 9	Homer Bryce Stadium; Nacogdoches, TX (NCAA Division I-AA First Round)	W 24–0		
December 3	at No. 2 Georgia Southern*	No. 9	Paulson Stadium; Statesboro, GA (NCAA Division I-AA Quarterfinal)	L 6–27	12,289	
*Non-conference game; Rankings from NCAA Division I-AA Football Committee Poll released prior to the game
