= 1988 Florida A&M Rattlers football team =

American college football season

1988 Florida A&M Rattlers football

MEAC co-champion
- Conference: Mid-Eastern Athletic Conference
- Record: 6–4–1 (4–2 MEAC)
- Head coach: Ken Riley (3rd season)
- Defensive coordinator: Wally Highsmith (3rd season)
- Home stadium: Bragg Memorial Stadium

1988 Mid-Eastern Athletic Conference football standings
	Conf.					Overall
Team	W		L		T	W		L		T
Bethune–Cookman $	4	–	2	–	0	5	–	6	–	0
No. 18 Florida A&M	4	–	2	–	0	6	–	4	–	1
Delaware State	4	–	2	–	0	5	–	5	–	0
Howard	3	–	3	–	0	7	–	4	–	0
South Carolina State	3	–	3	–	0	4	–	7	–	0
North Carolina A&T	2	–	4	–	0	2	–	9	–	0
Morgan State	0	–	6	–	0	1	–	10	–	0
$ – Conference champion; Both Delaware State and Florida A&M received forfeit losses for the same game. Bethune–Cookman was awarded the conference title, although the MEAC website lists Bethune, Delaware State, and Florida A&M as co-champions.; Rankings from NCAA Division I-AA Football Committee poll

The 1988 Florida A&M Rattlers football team represented Florida A&M University as a member of the Mid-Eastern Athletic Conference (MEAC) during the 1988 NCAA Division I-AA football season. Led by third-year head coach Ken Riley, the Rattlers compiled an overall record of 6–4–1, with a mark of 4–2 in conference play, and finished as MEAC co-champion.

== Schedule ==
Date	Opponent	Rank	Site	Result	Attendance	Source
September 3	at Delaware State		Alumni Stadium; Dover, DE	W 35–31	7,500	
September 10	vs. No. 6 Georgia Southern*		Gator Bowl Stadium; Jacksonville, FL	L 14–42	18,556	
September 24	at Tennessee State*		Hale Stadium; Nashville, TN	W 23–6	17,434	
October 1	vs. No. 18 Jackson State*		Hoosier Dome; Indianapolis, IN (Circle City Classic)	T 10–10	47,259	
October 8	vs. North Carolina A&T		Miami Orange Bowl; Miami, FL (Orange Blossom Classic)	W 58–7	24,051	
October 15	Morgan State		Bragg Memorial Stadium; Tallahassee, FL	W 35–14	8,894	
October 22	South Carolina State		Bragg Memorial Stadium; Tallahassee, FL	L 23–14 (forfeit)		
October 29	at Southern*		A. W. Mumford Stadium; Baton Rouge, LA	W 45–20	20,553	
November 5	Howard^{†}		Bragg Memorial Stadium; Tallahassee, FL	W 34–17	30,829	
November 19	Central State (OH)*	No. T–14	Bragg Memorial Stadium; Tallahassee, FL	L 23–27	7,467	
November 26	vs. Bethune–Cookman	No. T–18	Tampa Stadium; Tampa, FL (Florida Classic)	L 0–25	50,259	
*Non-conference game; ^{†}Homecoming; Rankings from NCAA Division I-AA Football Committee Poll released prior to the game
