= 1988 Western Illinois Leathernecks football team =

American college football season

1988 Western Illinois Leathernecks football

Gateway champion

NCAA Division I-AA First Round, L 32–35 vs. Western Kentucky
- Conference: Gateway Collegiate Athletic Conference
- Record: 10–2 (6–0 Gateway)
- Head coach: Bruce Craddock (6th season)
- Offensive coordinator: Randy Ball (6th season)
- Home stadium: Hanson Field

1988 Gateway Collegiate Athletic Conference football standings
	Conf.					Overall
Team	W		L		T	W		L		T
No. 3 Western Illinois $^	6	–	0	–	0	10	–	2	–	0
Southwest Missouri State	4	–	2	–	0	5	–	5	–	0
Indiana State	4	–	2	–	0	5	–	6	–	0
Northern Iowa	3	–	3	–	0	5	–	6	–	0
Eastern Illinois	2	–	4	–	0	5	–	6	–	0
Southern Illinois	2	–	4	–	0	4	–	7	–	0
Illinois State	0	–	6	–	0	1	–	10	–	0
$ – Conference champion; ^ – NCAA Division I-AA playoff participant; Rankings from NCAA Division I-AA Football Committee poll

The 1988 Western Illinois Leathernecks football team represented Western Illinois University as a member of the Gateway Collegiate Athletic Conference during the 1988 NCAA Division I-AA football season. They were led by sixth-year head coach Bruce Craddock and played their home games at Hanson Field. The Leathernecks finished the season with a 10–1 record overall and a 6–0 record in conference play, making them the conference champions. Senior and 4-year starter Paul Singer was the Leathernecks' quarterback. He was selected to five All-American teams, as well as being a GTE and NCAA Academic All-American, the Conference Player of the Year, and the national Player of the Year runner-up. He held nearly every WIU passing and offensive record, as well as several conference records. The 10 wins were the most in the nearly 100-year history of WIU football.

== Schedule ==
Date	Opponent	Rank	Site	Result	Attendance	Source
September 3	Southern Illinois	No. 12	Hanson Field; Macomb, IL	W 17–13	9,226	
September 10	Grand Valley State*	No. 12	Hanson Field; Macomb, IL	W 55–0	11,123	
September 17	at Southwest Missouri State	No. 12	Briggs Stadium; Springfield, MO	W 35–31	7,655	
September 24	at Indiana State	No. 4	Memorial Stadium; Terre Haute, IN	W 24–21	8,034	
October 1	at Northern Iowa	No. 4	UNI-Dome; Cedar Falls, IA	W 28–27	12,321	
October 8	Northwest Missouri State*	No. 2	Hanson Field; Macomb, IL	W 63–3	13,392	
October 15	Eastern Illinois	No. 2	Hanson Field; Macomb, IL	W 45–8	9,680	
October 22	at Liberty*	No. 2	Lynchburg City Stadium; Lynchburg, VA	W 36–35	11,400	
October 29	Illinois State	No. 3	Hanson Field; Macomb, IL	W 13–10	13,833	
November 5	at Northern Illinois*	No. 2	Huskie Stadium; DeKalb, IL	L 6–16	7,556	
November 12	at Delaware State*	No. 4	Alumni Stadium; Dover, DE	W 22–13	3,000	
November 26	No. 13 Western Kentucky*	No. 3	Hanson Field; Macomb, IL (NCAA Division I-AA First Round)	L 32–35	6,000	
*Non-conference game; Rankings from NCAA Division I-AA Football Committee Poll released prior to the game
