= 1988 Maine Black Bears football team =

American college football season

1988 Maine Black Bears football
- Conference: Yankee Conference
- Record: 7–4 (4–4 Yankee)
- Head coach: Tim Murphy (2nd season)
- Defensive coordinator: John Lovett (4th season)
- Captain: Nick Penna
- Home stadium: Alumni Field

1988 Yankee Conference football standings
| | Conf. | | | | | Overall |
| Team | W | | L | | T | W | | L | | T |
|---|---|---|---|---|---|---|---|---|---|---|
| No. T–10 UMass +^ | 6 | – | 2 | – | 0 | 8 | – | 4 | – | 0 |
| No. 15 Delaware +^ | 6 | – | 2 | – | 0 | 7 | – | 5 | – | 0 |
| Connecticut | 4 | – | 4 | – | 0 | 7 | – | 4 | – | 0 |
| Maine | 4 | – | 4 | – | 0 | 7 | – | 4 | – | 0 |
| New Hampshire | 4 | – | 4 | – | 0 | 6 | – | 5 | – | 0 |
| Villanova | 4 | – | 4 | – | 0 | 5 | – | 5 | – | 1 |
| Boston University | 3 | – | 5 | – | 0 | 4 | – | 7 | – | 0 |
| Rhode Island | 3 | – | 5 | – | 0 | 3 | – | 8 | – | 0 |
| Richmond | 2 | – | 6 | – | 0 | 4 | – | 7 | – | 0 |
+ – Conference co-champions; ^ – NCAA Division I-AA playoff participant; Rankings from NCAA Division I-AA Football Committee poll

The 1988 Maine Black Bears football team was an American football team that represented the University of Maine as a member of the Yankee Conference during the 1988 NCAA Division I-AA football season. In their second and final season under head coach Tim Murphy, the Black Bears compiled a 7–4 record (4–4 against conference opponents) and finished in a four-way tie for third place in the Yankee Conference. Nick Penna was the team captain.

== Schedule ==
| Date | Opponent | Rank | Site | Result | Attendance | Source |
|---|---|---|---|---|---|---|
| September 10 | at UMass | No. 14 | McGuirk Stadium; Hadley, MA | L 42–45 | 12,458 | |
| September 17 | Northeastern* | No. 14 | Alumni Field; Orono, ME | W 43–20 | 9,122 | |
| September 24 | No. T–6 New Hampshire | No. 19 | Alumni Field; Orono, ME (rivalry) | L 23–44 | 11,138 | |
| October 1 | at Richmond | | UR Stadium; Richmond, VA | W 17–3 | 11,834 | |
| October 8 | vs. Boston University | | Fitzpatrick Stadium; Portland, ME | W 30–10 | 6,400 | |
| October 15 | Rhode Island | | Alumni Field; Orono, ME | W 28–14 | 10,014 | |
| October 22 | at Connecticut | | Memorial Stadium; Storrs, CT | L 21–28 | 3,472 | |
| October 29 | No. 12 Delaware | | Alumni Field; Orono, ME | L 14–31 | 4,055 | |
| November 5 | at Brown* | | Brown Stadium; Providence, RI | W 37–10 | 1,600 | |
| November 12 | at Towson State* | | Minnegan Stadium; Towson, MD | W 44–7 | | |
| November 19 | at Villanova | | Villanova Stadium; Villanova, PA | W 20–17 | 9,437 | |
*Non-conference game; Rankings from NCAA Division I-AA Football Committee Poll released prior to the game
