= 1988 Northeast Louisiana Indians football team =

American college football season

1988 Northeast Louisiana Indians football
- Conference: Southland Conference
- Record: 5–6 (2–4 SLC)
- Head coach: Pat Collins (8th season)
- Home stadium: Malone Stadium

1988 Southland Conference football standings
	Conf.					Overall
Team	W		L		T	W		L		T
No. 8 Northwestern State $^	6	–	0	–	0	10	–	3	–	0
No. 9 Stephen F. Austin ^	5	–	1	–	0	10	–	3	–	0
No. 10 North Texas ^	4	–	2	–	0	8	–	4	–	0
McNeese State	3	–	3	–	0	6	–	5	–	0
Northeast Louisiana	2	–	4	–	0	5	–	6	–	0
SW Texas State	1	–	5	–	0	4	–	7	–	0
Sam Houston State	0	–	6	–	0	3	–	8	–	0
$ – Conference champion; ^ – NCAA Division I-AA playoff participant; Rankings from NCAA Division I-AA Football Committee poll

The 1988 Northeast Louisiana Indians football team was an American football team that represented Northeast Louisiana University (now known as the University of Louisiana at Monroe) as part of the Southland Conference during the 1988 NCAA Division I-AA football season. In their eighth year under head coach Pat Collins, the team compiled a 5–6 record.

== Schedule ==
Date	Opponent	Site	Result	Attendance	Source
September 3	at Nicholls State*	John L. Guidry Stadium; Thibodaux, LA	W 22–6		
September 10	at McNeese State	Cowboy Stadium; Lake Charles, LA	L 0–23	17,200	
September 17	Southwest Texas State	Malone Stadium; Monroe, LA	W 29–27	17,833	
September 24	at Arkansas State*	Indian Stadium; Jonesboro, AR	W 16–13	14,488	
October 1	Stephen F. Austin	Malone Stadium; Monroe, LA	L 3–20		
October 8	at North Texas	Fouts Field; Denton, TX	L 23–26	16,250	
October 15	at Georgia Southern*	Paulson Stadium; Statesboro, GA	L 11–43	20,228	
October 22	vs. Northwestern State	Independence Stadium; Shreveport, LA (rivalry)	L 15–27	11,568	
October 29	Lamar*	Malone Stadium; Monroe, LA	W 24–3		
November 12	Sam Houston State	Malone Stadium; Monroe, LA	W 17–3		
November 19	Louisiana Tech*	Malone Stadium; Monroe, LA (rivalry)	L 0–23	17,500	
*Non-conference game
