= 1988 New Hampshire Wildcats football team =

American college football season

1988 New Hampshire Wildcats football
- Conference: Yankee Conference
- Record: 6–5 (4–4 Yankee)
- Head coach: Bill Bowes (17th season)
- Offensive coordinator: Gary Crowton (1st season)
- Home stadium: Cowell Stadium

1988 Yankee Conference football standings
| | Conf. | | | | | Overall |
| Team | W | | L | | T | W | | L | | T |
|---|---|---|---|---|---|---|---|---|---|---|
| No. T–10 UMass +^ | 6 | – | 2 | – | 0 | 8 | – | 4 | – | 0 |
| No. 15 Delaware +^ | 6 | – | 2 | – | 0 | 7 | – | 5 | – | 0 |
| Connecticut | 4 | – | 4 | – | 0 | 7 | – | 4 | – | 0 |
| Maine | 4 | – | 4 | – | 0 | 7 | – | 4 | – | 0 |
| New Hampshire | 4 | – | 4 | – | 0 | 6 | – | 5 | – | 0 |
| Villanova | 4 | – | 4 | – | 0 | 5 | – | 5 | – | 1 |
| Boston University | 3 | – | 5 | – | 0 | 4 | – | 7 | – | 0 |
| Rhode Island | 3 | – | 5 | – | 0 | 3 | – | 8 | – | 0 |
| Richmond | 2 | – | 6 | – | 0 | 4 | – | 7 | – | 0 |
+ – Conference co-champions; ^ – NCAA Division I-AA playoff participant; Rankings from NCAA Division I-AA Football Committee poll

The 1988 New Hampshire Wildcats football team was an American football team that represented the University of New Hampshire as a member of the Yankee Conference during the 1988 NCAA Division I-AA football season. In its 17th year under head coach Bill Bowes, the team compiled a 6–5 record (4–4 against conference opponents) and tied for third place out of eight teams in the Yankee Conference.

== Schedule ==
| Date | Opponent | Rank | Site | Result | Attendance | Source |
|---|---|---|---|---|---|---|
| September 10 | at Colgate* | | Andy Kerr Stadium; Hamilton, NY | W 21–7 | 4,000 | |
| September 17 | No. 20 Connecticut | | Cowell Stadium; Durham, NH | W 27–20 | 7,788 | |
| September 24 | at No. 19 Maine | No. T–6 | Alumni Field; Orono, ME (rivalry) | W 44–23 | 11,138 | |
| October 1 | Delaware | No. T–4 | Cowell Stadium; Durham, NH | L 20–38 | 10,643 | |
| October 8 | at Richmond | No. T–19 | University of Richmond Stadium; Richmond, VA | L 17–23 ^{OT} | 15,672 | |
| October 15 | at William & Mary* | | Cary Field; Williamsburg, VA | L 31–33 | 9,000 | |
| October 22 | Northeastern* | | Cowell Stadium; Durham, NH | W 15–10 | 1,216 | |
| October 29 | at Boston University | | Nickerson Field; Boston, MA | L 21–23 | | |
| November 5 | No. 15 Villanova | | Cowell Stadium; Durham, NH | W 58–7 | | |
| November 12 | at Rhode Island | | Meade Stadium; Kingston, RI | W 17–9 | 3,669 | |
| November 19 | No. 11 UMass | No. 20 | Cowell Stadium; Durham, NH (rivalry) | L 42–64 | 8,650 | |
*Non-conference game; Rankings from NCAA Division I-AA Football Committee Poll released prior to the game
