= 1988 Northwestern State Demons football team =

American college football season

1988 Northwestern State Demons football

SLC champion

NCAA Division I-AA quarterfinal, L 30–38 vs. Idaho
- Conference: Southland Conference
- Record: 10–3 (6–0 Southland)
- Head coach: Sam Goodwin (6th season)
- Defensive coordinator: John Thompson (1st in stint; 5th overall season)
- Home stadium: Harry Turpin Stadium

1988 Southland Conference football standings
	Conf.					Overall
Team	W		L		T	W		L		T
No. 8 Northwestern State $^	6	–	0	–	0	10	–	3	–	0
No. 9 Stephen F. Austin ^	5	–	1	–	0	10	–	3	–	0
No. 10 North Texas ^	4	–	2	–	0	8	–	4	–	0
McNeese State	3	–	3	–	0	6	–	5	–	0
Northeast Louisiana	2	–	4	–	0	5	–	6	–	0
SW Texas State	1	–	5	–	0	4	–	7	–	0
Sam Houston State	0	–	6	–	0	3	–	8	–	0
$ – Conference champion; ^ – NCAA Division I-AA playoff participant; Rankings from NCAA Division I-AA Football Committee poll

The 1988 Northwestern State Demons football team was an American football team that represented Northwestern State University as a member of the Southland Conference during the 1988 NCAA Division I-AA football season. In their sixth year under head coach Sam Goodwin, the team compiled an overall record of 10–3, with a mark of 6–0 in conference play, and finished as Southland champion. After they defeated Boise State in the first round, the Demons lost to Idaho in the Division I-AA quarterfinals.

== Schedule ==
Date	Opponent	Rank	Site	Result	Attendance	Source
September 3	Southwest Missouri State*		Harry Turpin Stadium; Natchitoches, LA	W 24–8		
September 10	at No. T–18 Nevada*		Mackay Stadium; Reno, NV	L 26–35	13,850	
September 24	No. 10 (D-II) East Texas State*		Harry Turpin Stadium; Natchitoches, LA	W 41–13	8,200	
October 1	Southwest Texas State		Harry Turpin Stadium; Natchitoches, LA	W 49–21	8,500	
October 8	at McNeese State	No. T–19	Cowboy Stadium; Lake Charles, LA (rivalry)	W 25–20		
October 15	Nicholls State*	No. 18	Harry Turpin Stadium; Natchitoches, LA (rivalry)	W 27–12		
October 22	vs. Northeast Louisiana	No. 16	Independence Stadium; Shreveport, LA (rivalry)	W 27–15	11,568	
October 29	Sam Houston State	No. 13	Harry Turpin Stadium; Natchitoches, LA	W 49–14	9,750	
November 5	at No. 7 North Texas	No. 11	Fouts Field; Denton, TX	W 25–17	13,920	
November 12	at No. 10 Jackson State*	No. 7	Mississippi Veterans Memorial Stadium; Jackson, MS	L 16–21	10,500	
November 19	at No. 1 Stephen F. Austin	No. 10	Homer Bryce Stadium; Nacogdoches, TX (rivalry)	W 20–17		
November 26	at No. 12 Boise State*	No. 8	Bronco Stadium; Boise, ID (NCAA Division I-AA first round)	W 22–13	10,537	
December 3	at No. 1 Idaho*	No. 8	Kibbie Dome; Moscow, ID (NCAA Division I-AA quarterfinal)	L 30–38	6,800	
*Non-conference game; Rankings from NCAA Division I-AA Football Committee Poll released prior to the game
