= 1988 Western Kentucky Hilltoppers football team =

American college football season

1988 Western Kentucky Hilltoppers football

NCAA Division I-AA Quarterfinal, L 24–41 at Eastern Kentucky
- Conference: Independent
- Record: 9–4
- Head coach: Dave Roberts (5th season)
- Home stadium: L. T. Smith Stadium

1988 NCAA Division I-AA independents football standings
	Conf.			Overall
Team	W	L	T	W		L		T
No. 2 Georgia Southern ^		–		10	–	2	–	0
No. 13 Western Kentucky ^		–		9	–	4	–	0
Liberty		–		8	–	3	–	0
Nicholls State		–		7	–	4	–	0
William & Mary		–		6	–	4	–	1
Towson State		–		5	–	5	–	0
Arkansas State		–		5	–	6	–	0
James Madison		–		5	–	6	–	0
Louisiana Tech		–		4	–	7	–	0
Northeastern		–		4	–	7	–	0
Youngstown State		–		4	–	7	–	0
Lamar		–		3	–	8	–	0
^ – NCAA Division I-AA playoff participant; Rankings from NCAA Division I-AA Football Committee poll

The 1988 Western Kentucky Hilltoppers football team represented Western Kentucky University in the 1988 NCAA Division I-AA football season and were led by head coach Dave Roberts. The team earned their second consecutive NCAA Division I-AA playoff berth, making it to the quarterfinals. The Hilltoppers finished the season ranked 13th in the final national poll.

Western Kentucky's roster included future National Football League (NFL) players Tony Brown, Eddie Godfrey, Anthony Green, Jerome Martin, Xavier Jordan, Dean Tiebout, Jonathan Watts, and Riley Ware. Joe Arnold, Tiebout, and Dewayne Penn were named to the AP All American team.

== Schedule ==
Date	Opponent	Rank	Site	Result	Attendance	Source
September 10	at Morehead State	No. 17	Jayne Stadium; Morehead, KY	W 34–0	6,500	
September 17	at No. 15 Middle Tennessee	No. 17	Johnny "Red" Floyd Stadium; Murfreesboro, TN	L 10–13	10,500	
September 24	No. 8 Eastern Kentucky		L. T. Smith Stadium; Bowling Green, KY (Battle of the Bluegrass)	W 16–14	18,000	
October 1	Austin Peay	No. 14	L. T. Smith Stadium; Bowling Green, KY	W 28–3	7,500	
October 8	Illinois State	No. 10	L. T. Smith Stadium; Bowling Green, KY	W 31–16	10,200	
October 15	at Southwest Missouri State	No. 8	Briggs Stadium; Springfield, MO	W 21–14	8,059	
October 22	at Tennessee Tech	No. 5	Tucker Stadium; Cookeville, TN	W 20–17	9,242	
October 29	Chattanooga^{†}	No. 5	L. T. Smith Stadium; Bowling Green, KY	W 31–29	18,200	
November 5	at Eastern Illinois	No. 5	O'Brien Field; Charleston, IL	L 0–6	10,021	
November 12	at Louisville	No. 11	Cardinal Stadium; Louisville, KY	L 17–35	31,636	
November 19	North Carolina A&T	No. 16	L. T. Smith Stadium; Bowling Green, KY	W 44–0	2,500	
November 26	at No. 3 Western Illinois	No. 13	Hanson Field; Macomb, IL (NCAA Division I-AA First Round)	W 35–32	6,000	
December 3	at No. 7 Eastern Kentucky	No. 13	Hanger Field; Richmond, KY (NCAA Division I-AA Quarterfinal)	L 24–41	8,100	
^{†}Homecoming; Rankings from NCAA Division I-AA Football Committee Poll released prior to the game
