= 1988 Northern Iowa Panthers football team =

American college football season

1988 Northern Iowa Panthers football
- Conference: Gateway Collegiate Athletic Conference
- Record: 5–6 (3–3 GCAC)
- Head coach: Earle Bruce (1st season)
- Home stadium: UNI-Dome

1988 Gateway Collegiate Athletic Conference football standings
	Conf.					Overall
Team	W		L		T	W		L		T
No. 3 Western Illinois $^	6	–	0	–	0	10	–	2	–	0
Southwest Missouri State	4	–	2	–	0	5	–	5	–	0
Indiana State	4	–	2	–	0	5	–	6	–	0
Northern Iowa	3	–	3	–	0	5	–	6	–	0
Eastern Illinois	2	–	4	–	0	5	–	6	–	0
Southern Illinois	2	–	4	–	0	4	–	7	–	0
Illinois State	0	–	6	–	0	1	–	10	–	0
$ – Conference champion; ^ – NCAA Division I-AA playoff participant; Rankings from NCAA Division I-AA Football Committee poll

The 1988 Northern Iowa Panthers football team was an American football team that represented the University of Northern Iowa as a member of the Gateway Collegiate Athletic Conference (Gateway Conference) during the 1988 NCAA Division I-AA football season. In its first and only season under head coach Earl Bruce, the team compiled a 5–6 record (3–3 in conference games) and finished fourth in the Gateway Conference. The team's 77–0 victory over Wayne State (NE) was the second largest margin of victory in school history, while its 59–10 loss to Pittsburgh was one of the largest margins of defeat in school history.

Two Northern Iowa players were honored as first-team players on the 1988 all-Gateway Conference football team: tight end Sherrod Howard and punter/kicker Doug Jackson. Six others were named to the second team. Wes Anderson tallied 835 yards on kick returns and 484 rushing yards and averaged 146.6 all-purpose yards per game.

Bruce was hired as the team's head coach with a base salary of $64,000 in June 1988, having been fired late in the 1987 season by Ohio State. He resigned as Northern Iowa's head coach in December 1988, less than six months after accepting the post.

The team played its home games at the UNI-Dome in Cedar Falls, Iowa.

== Schedule ==
Date	Time	Opponent	Site	Result	Attendance	Source
September 3	7:30 p.m.	at Pittsburgh*	Pitt Stadium; Pittsburgh, PA	L 10–59	35,755	
September 17	7:00 p.m.	Morgan State*	UNI-Dome; Cedar Falls, IA	W 59–14	9,607	
September 24	7:00 p.m.	Southwest Missouri State	UNI-Dome; Cedar Falls, IA	L 9–28	10,734	
October 1	1:30 p.m.	No. 4 Western Illinois^{†}	UNI-Dome; Cedar Falls, IA	L 27–28	12,321	
October 8	1:00 p.m.	at Iowa State*	Cyclone Stadium; Ames, IA	L 17–20	46,219	
October 15	1:30 p.m.	at Illinois State	Hancock Stadium; Normal, IL	W 34–7	7,709	
October 22	2:00 p.m.	at Eastern Illinois	O'Brien Stadium; Charleston, IL	W 17–15	9,677	
October 29	7:00 p.m.	Indiana State	UNI-Dome; Cedar Falls, IA	L 6–24	14,920	
November 3	7:00 p.m.	at Northern Arizona*	Walkup Skydome; Flagstaff, AZ	L 12–25	11,545	
November 12	7:00 p.m.	Wayne State (NE)*	UNI-Dome; Cedar Falls, IA	W 77–0	9,808	
November 19	1:30 p.m.	at Southern Illinois	McAndrew Stadium; Carbondale, IL	W 24–21	2,500	
*Non-conference game; ^{†}Homecoming; Rankings from NCAA Division I-AA Football Committee Poll released prior to the game; All times are in Central time
