= 1988 Nicholls State Colonels football team =

American college football season

1988 Nicholls State Colonels football
- Conference: Independent
- Record: 7–4
- Head coach: Phil Greco (2nd season)
- Home stadium: John L. Guidry Stadium

1988 NCAA Division I-AA independents football standings
	Conf.			Overall
Team	W	L	T	W		L		T
No. 2 Georgia Southern ^		–		10	–	2	–	0
No. 13 Western Kentucky ^		–		9	–	4	–	0
Liberty		–		8	–	3	–	0
Nicholls State		–		7	–	4	–	0
William & Mary		–		6	–	4	–	1
Towson State		–		5	–	5	–	0
Arkansas State		–		5	–	6	–	0
James Madison		–		5	–	6	–	0
Louisiana Tech		–		4	–	7	–	0
Northeastern		–		4	–	7	–	0
Youngstown State		–		4	–	7	–	0
Lamar		–		3	–	8	–	0
^ – NCAA Division I-AA playoff participant; Rankings from NCAA Division I-AA Football Committee poll

The 1988 Nicholls State Colonels football team represented Nicholls State University as an independent during the 1988 NCAA Division I-AA football season. Led by second-year head coach Phil Greco, the Colonels compiled a record of 7–4. Nicholls State played home games at John L. Guidry Stadium in Thibodaux, Louisiana.

== Schedule ==
Date	Opponent	Rank	Site	Result	Attendance	Source
September 3	No. 2 Northeast Louisiana	No. 13	John L. Guidry Stadium; Thibodaux, LA	L 6–22		
September 10	at Samford	No. 13	Seibert Stadium; Homewood, AL	W 43–17		
September 17	at Weber State	No. 13	Wildcat Stadium; Ogden, UT	W 28–23	7,943	
September 24	at Louisiana Tech		Joe Aillet Stadium; Ruston, LA	L 10–31	18,339	
October 1	No. 17 McNeese State		John L. Guidry Stadium; Thibodaux, LA	W 23–19		
October 8	Southern		John L. Guidry Stadium; Thibodaux, LA	W 24–0		
October 15	at No. 18 Northwestern State		Harry Turpin Stadium; Natchitoches, LA (rivalry)	L 12–27		
October 29	at Southwest Texas State		Bobcat Stadium; San Marcos, TX (rivalry)	W 13–10		
November 5	at No. 3 Stephen F. Austin		Homer Bryce Stadium; Nacogdoches, TX	L 7–30		
November 12	Northern Arizona		John L. Guidry Stadium; Thibodaux, LA	W 23–5	5,685	
November 19	Texas Southern		John L. Guidry Stadium; Thibodaux, LA	W 26–13		
Rankings from NCAA Division I-AA Football Committee Poll released prior to the game
