= 1988 William & Mary Tribe football team =

American college football season

1988 William & Mary Tribe football

Ivy Bowl, W 73–3 at Japan All-Stars
- Conference: Independent
- Record: 6–4–1
- Head coach: Jimmye Laycock (9th season)
- Captains: John Brosnahan; Dave Wiley
- Home stadium: Cary Field

1988 NCAA Division I-AA independents football standings
	Conf.			Overall
Team	W	L	T	W		L		T
No. 2 Georgia Southern ^		–		10	–	2	–	0
No. 13 Western Kentucky ^		–		9	–	4	–	0
Liberty		–		8	–	3	–	0
Nicholls State		–		7	–	4	–	0
William & Mary		–		6	–	4	–	1
Towson State		–		5	–	5	–	0
Arkansas State		–		5	–	6	–	0
James Madison		–		5	–	6	–	0
Louisiana Tech		–		4	–	7	–	0
Northeastern		–		4	–	7	–	0
Youngstown State		–		4	–	7	–	0
Lamar		–		3	–	8	–	0
^ – NCAA Division I-AA playoff participant; Rankings from NCAA Division I-AA Football Committee poll

The 1988 William & Mary Tribe football team represented the College of William & Mary as an independent during the 1988 NCAA Division I-AA football season. Led by Jimmye Laycock in his ninth year as head coach, William & Mary finished the season with a record of 6–4–1.

== Schedule ==
Date	Opponent	Rank	Site	Result	Attendance	Source
September 3	at Virginia		Scott Stadium; Charlottesville, VA	L 23–31	32,000	
September 10	VMI		Cary Field; Williamsburg, VA (rivalry)	W 30–7	9,106	
September 17	Lehigh		Cary Field; Williamsburg, VA	W 14–6	5,842	
September 24	at James Madison	No. 17	JMU Stadium; Harrisonburg, VA (rivalry)	W 10–3	7,000	
October 8	at Delaware	No. 9	Delaware Stadium; Newark, DE (rivalry)	L 35–38	20,079	
October 15	New Hampshire		Cary Field; Williamsburg, VA	W 33–31	9,000	
October 22	No. 20 Villanova	No. T–17	Cary Field; Williamsburg, VA	T 14–14		
October 29	at No. 18 (I-A) Georgia	No. 20	Sanford Stadium; Athens, GA	L 24–59	80,712	
November 5	Wofford		Cary Field; Williamsburg, VA	W 30–14	12,316	
November 12	Colgate		Cary Field; Williamsburg, VA	W 28–3	9,758	
November 19	at Richmond		University of Richmond Stadium; Richmond, VA (I-64 Bowl)	L 19–24	14,907	
January 8, 1989	at Japan All-Stars		(Japan) Yokohama Stadium; Yokohama, Japan (Ivy Bowl)	W 73–3	11,000	
Rankings from NCAA Division I-AA Football Committee Poll released prior to the game
