= 1988 Delaware Fightin' Blue Hens football team =

American college football season

1988 Delaware Fightin' Blue Hens football

Yankee Conference co-champion

NCAA DivisionI-AA First Round, L 7–21 at Furman
- Conference: Yankee Conference
- Record: 7–5 (6–2 Yankee)
- Head coach: Tubby Raymond (23rd season)
- Offensive coordinator: Ted Kempski (21st season)
- Offensive scheme: Delaware Wing-T
- Base defense: 5–2
- Home stadium: Delaware Stadium

1988 Yankee Conference football standings
	Conf.					Overall
Team	W		L		T	W		L		T
No. T–10 UMass +^	6	–	2	–	0	8	–	4	–	0
No. 15 Delaware +^	6	–	2	–	0	7	–	5	–	0
Connecticut	4	–	4	–	0	7	–	4	–	0
Maine	4	–	4	–	0	7	–	4	–	0
New Hampshire	4	–	4	–	0	6	–	5	–	0
Villanova	4	–	4	–	0	5	–	5	–	1
Boston University	3	–	5	–	0	4	–	7	–	0
Rhode Island	3	–	5	–	0	3	–	8	–	0
Richmond	2	–	6	–	0	4	–	7	–	0
+ – Conference co-champions; ^ – NCAA Division I-AA playoff participant; Rankings from NCAA Division I-AA Football Committee poll

The 1988 Delaware Fightin' Blue Hens football team represented the University of Delaware as a member of the Yankee Conference during the 1988 NCAA Division I-AA football season. Led by 23rd-year head coach Tubby Raymond, the Fightin' Blue Hens compiled an overall record of 7–5 with a mark of 6–2 in conference play, sharing the Yankee Conference title with UMass. Delaware advanced to the NCAA Division I-AA Football Championship playoffs, where Fightin' Blue Hens lost in the first round to Eastern Kentucky. The team played home games at Delaware Stadium in Newark, Delaware.

== Schedule ==
Date	Opponent	Rank	Site	Result	Attendance	Source
September 10	at Navy*		Navy–Marine Corps Memorial Stadium; Annapolis, MD	L 3–30	22,987	
September 17	Rhode Island		Delaware Stadium; Newark, DE	L 17–23	16,903	
September 24	at Richmond		University of Richmond Stadium; Richmond, VA	W 27–10	15,026	
October 1	at No. T–4 New Hampshire		Cowell Stadium; Durham, NH	W 21–20	10,643	
October 8	No. 9 William & Mary*^{†}		Delaware Stadium; Newark, DE (rivalry)	W 38–35	20,079	
October 15	at No. 15 Villanova	No. 19	Villanova Stadium; Villanova, PA (Battle of the Blue)	W 10–7		
October 22	UMass	No. 14	Delaware Stadium; Newark, DE	W 10–7	22,301	
October 29	at Maine	No. 12	Alumni Field; Orono, ME	W 31–14	4,055	
November 5	No. 14 Connecticut	No. 9	Delaware Stadium; Newark, DE	L 20–21	14,726	
November 12	No. 2 (D-II) West Chester*	No. 13	Delaware Stadium; Newark, DE (rivalry)	L 13–33	16,904	
November 19	Boston University		Delaware Stadium; Newark, DE	W 38–18	14,202	
November 26	at No. 4 Furman*	No. 15	Paladin Stadium; Greenville, SC (NCAA Division I-AA First Round)	L 7–21	7,487	
*Non-conference game; ^{†}Homecoming; Rankings from NCAA Division I-AA Football Committee Poll released prior to the game
