= 1988 Richmond Spiders football team =

American college football season

1988 Richmond Spiders football
- Conference: Yankee Conference
- Record: 4–7 (2–6 Yankee)
- Head coach: Dal Shealy (9th season)
- Home stadium: UR Stadium

1988 Yankee Conference football standings
	Conf.					Overall
Team	W		L		T	W		L		T
No. T–10 UMass +^	6	–	2	–	0	8	–	4	–	0
No. 15 Delaware +^	6	–	2	–	0	7	–	5	–	0
Connecticut	4	–	4	–	0	7	–	4	–	0
Maine	4	–	4	–	0	7	–	4	–	0
New Hampshire	4	–	4	–	0	6	–	5	–	0
Villanova	4	–	4	–	0	5	–	5	–	1
Boston University	3	–	5	–	0	4	–	7	–	0
Rhode Island	3	–	5	–	0	3	–	8	–	0
Richmond	2	–	6	–	0	4	–	7	–	0
+ – Conference co-champions; ^ – NCAA Division I-AA playoff participant; Rankings from NCAA Division I-AA Football Committee poll

The 1988 Richmond Spiders football team was an American football team that represented the University of Richmond as a member of the Yankee Conference during the 1988 NCAA Division I-AA football season. In their ninth season under head coach Dal Shealy, Richmond compiled a 4–7 record, with a mark of 2–6 in conference play, finishing in ninth place in the Yankee.

== Schedule ==
Date	Opponent	Rank	Site	Result	Attendance	Source
September 10	at Connecticut	No. 7	Memorial Stadium; Storrs, CT	L 12–35	6,536	
September 17	at VMI*	No. 7	Alumni Memorial Field; Lexington, VA (rivalry)	W 14–13	6,060	
September 24	Delaware		UR Stadium; Richmond, VA	L 10–27	15,026	
October 1	Maine		UR Stadium; Richmond, VA	L 3–17	11,834	
October 8	New Hampshire		UR Stadium; Richmond, VA	W 23–17 ^{OT}	15,672	
October 16	vs. Boston University		(United Kingdom) Crystal Palace National Sports Centre; London, UK (Imperial Bowl)	W 20–17	5,000	
October 22	at Rhode Island		Meade Stadium; Kingston, RI	L 10–14	5,980	
October 29	at Villanova		Villanova Stadium; Villanova, PA	L 6–45	13,400	
November 5	UMass		UR Stadium; Richmond, VA	L 16–26	9,026	
November 12	James Madison*		UR Stadium; Richmond, VA (rivalry)	L 13–25	15,802	
November 19	William & Mary*		UR Stadium; Richmond, VA (rivalry)	W 24–19	14,907	
*Non-conference game; Rankings from NCAA Division I-AA Football Committee Poll released prior to the game
