= 1988 Connecticut Huskies football team =

American college football season

1988 Connecticut Huskies football
- Conference: Yankee Conference
- Record: 7–4 (4–4 Yankee)
- Head coach: Tom Jackson (6th season)
- Home stadium: Memorial Stadium

1988 Yankee Conference football standings
	Conf.					Overall
Team	W		L		T	W		L		T
No. T–10 UMass +^	6	–	2	–	0	8	–	4	–	0
No. 15 Delaware +^	6	–	2	–	0	7	–	5	–	0
Connecticut	4	–	4	–	0	7	–	4	–	0
Maine	4	–	4	–	0	7	–	4	–	0
New Hampshire	4	–	4	–	0	6	–	5	–	0
Villanova	4	–	4	–	0	5	–	5	–	1
Boston University	3	–	5	–	0	4	–	7	–	0
Rhode Island	3	–	5	–	0	3	–	8	–	0
Richmond	2	–	6	–	0	4	–	7	–	0
+ – Conference co-champions; ^ – NCAA Division I-AA playoff participant; Rankings from NCAA Division I-AA Football Committee poll

The 1988 Connecticut Huskies football team represented the University of Connecticut in the 1988 NCAA Division I-AA football season. The Huskies were led by sixth-year head coach Tom Jackson, and completed the season with a record of 7–4.

== Schedule ==
Date	Opponent	Rank	Site	Result	Attendance	Source
September 10	No. 7 Richmond		Memorial Stadium; Storrs, CT	W 35–12	6,536	
September 17	at New Hampshire	No. 20	Cowell Stadium; Durham, NH	L 20–27	7,788	
September 24	at Yale*		Yale Bowl; New Haven, CT	W 41–0	24,522	
October 1	at Northeastern*	No. 16	Parsons Field; Brookline, MA	W 25–24		
October 8	Villanova	No. 14	Memorial Stadium; Storrs, CT	L 14–21	5,084	
October 15	at No. 9 UMass		Warren McGuirk Alumni Stadium; Amherst, MA (rivalry)	W 35–14	14,301	
October 22	Maine		Memorial Stadium; Storrs, CT	W 28–21	3,472	
October 29	Southern Connecticut*	No. 16	Memorial Stadium; Storrs, CT	W 45–0	8,038	
November 5	at No. 9 Delaware	No. 14	Delaware Stadium; Newark, DE	W 21–20	14,726	
November 12	at Boston University	No. 9	Nickerson Field; Boston, MA	L 15–20	3,100	
November 19	Rhode Island	No. 17	Memorial Stadium; Storrs, CT (rivalry)	L 19–21		
*Non-conference game; Rankings from NCAA Division I-AA Football Committee Poll released prior to the game

== After the season ==
=== NFL draft ===
The following Husky was selected in the National Football League draft following the season.

Round	Pick	Player	Position	NFL club
9	238	David Franks	Guard	Seattle Seahawks
