= 1988 North Texas Mean Green football team =

American college football season

1988 North Texas Mean Green football

NCAA Division I-AA First Round, L 0–7 vs. Marshall
- Conference: Southland Conference
- Record: 8–4 (4–2 Southland)
- Head coach: Corky Nelson (7th season)
- Home stadium: Fouts Field

1988 Southland Conference football standings
	Conf.					Overall
Team	W		L		T	W		L		T
No. 8 Northwestern State $^	6	–	0	–	0	10	–	3	–	0
No. 9 Stephen F. Austin ^	5	–	1	–	0	10	–	3	–	0
No. 10 North Texas ^	4	–	2	–	0	8	–	4	–	0
McNeese State	3	–	3	–	0	6	–	5	–	0
Northeast Louisiana	2	–	4	–	0	5	–	6	–	0
SW Texas State	1	–	5	–	0	4	–	7	–	0
Sam Houston State	0	–	6	–	0	3	–	8	–	0
$ – Conference champion; ^ – NCAA Division I-AA playoff participant; Rankings from NCAA Division I-AA Football Committee poll

The 1988 North Texas Mean Green football team was an American football team that represented the University of North Texas during the 1988 NCAA Division I-AA football season as a member of the Southland Conference. In their seventh year under head coach Corky Nelson, the team compiled a 8–4 record.

== Schedule ==
Date	Opponent	Rank	Site	Result	Attendance	Source
September 3	at Texas Tech*	No. 5	Jones Stadium; Lubbock, TX	W 29–24	26,424	
September 17	Arkansas State*	No. 5	Fouts Field; Denton, TX	W 49–21	11,850	
September 24	at No. 21 (I-A) Texas*	No. 1	Texas Memorial Stadium; Austin, TX	L 24–27	60,152	
October 1	Eastern Washington*	No. 1	Fouts Field; Denton, TX	W 51–0	15,925	
October 8	Northeast Louisiana	No. 1	Fouts Field; Denton, TX	W 26–23	16,250	
October 15	McNeese State^{†}	No. 1	Fouts Field; Denton, TX	W 37–0	18,560	
October 22	at Sam Houston State	No. 1	Bowers Stadium; Huntsville, TX	W 24–3	6,220	
October 29	at No. 9 Stephen F. Austin	No. 1	Homer Bryce Stadium; Nacogdoches, TX	L 10–17	13,911	
November 5	No. 11 Northwestern State	No. 7	Fouts Field; Denton, TX	L 17–25	13,920	
November 12	at Southwest Texas State	No. 14	Bobcat Stadium; San Marcos, TX	W 30–10	6,215	
November 19	at Rice*	No. 12	Rice Stadium; Houston, TX	W 33–17	8,500	
November 25	at No. 6 Marshall*	No. 10т	Fairfield Stadium; Huntington, WV (NCAA Division I-AA First Round)	L 0–7	15,086	
*Non-conference game; ^{†}Homecoming; Rankings from NCAA Division I-AA Football Committee Poll released prior to the game

== Rankings ==
Ranking movements Legend: ██ Increase in ranking ██ Decrease in ranking т = Tied with team above or below ( ) = First-place votes
	Week										
Poll	Pre	1	2	3	4	5	6	7	8	9	Final
I-AA Football Committee	5	1 (4)	1 (3)	1 (4)	1 (4)	1 (4)	1 (4)	7	14	12	10т

== Game summaries ==
=== At Texas Tech ===
	1	2	3	4	Total
No. 5 Mean Green	3	7	9	10	29
Red Raiders	14	10	0	0	24

=== At No. 21 (I-A) Texas ===
	1	2	3	4	Total
No. 1 Mean Green	7	7	7	3	24
No. 21 (I-A) Longhorns	0	7	7	13	27

=== At No. 6 Marshall (NCAA Division I-AA First Round) ===
	1	2	3	4	Total
No. 10т Mean Green	0	0	0	0	0
No. 6 Thundering Herd	7	0	0	0	7
