= 1988 James Madison Dukes football team =

American college football season

1988 James Madison Dukes football
- Conference: Independent
- Record: 5–6
- Head coach: Joe Purzycki (4th season)
- Home stadium: JMU Stadium

1988 NCAA Division I-AA independents football standings
| | Conf. | | | Overall |
| Team | W | L | T | W | | L | | T |
|---|---|---|---|---|---|---|---|---|
| No. 2 Georgia Southern ^ | | – | | 10 | – | 2 | – | 0 |
| No. 13 Western Kentucky ^ | | – | | 9 | – | 4 | – | 0 |
| Liberty | | – | | 8 | – | 3 | – | 0 |
| Nicholls State | | – | | 7 | – | 4 | – | 0 |
| William & Mary | | – | | 6 | – | 4 | – | 1 |
| Towson State | | – | | 5 | – | 5 | – | 0 |
| Arkansas State | | – | | 5 | – | 6 | – | 0 |
| James Madison | | – | | 5 | – | 6 | – | 0 |
| Louisiana Tech | | – | | 4 | – | 7 | – | 0 |
| Northeastern | | – | | 4 | – | 7 | – | 0 |
| Youngstown State | | – | | 4 | – | 7 | – | 0 |
| Lamar | | – | | 3 | – | 8 | – | 0 |
^ – NCAA Division I-AA playoff participant; Rankings from NCAA Division I-AA Football Committee poll

The 1988 James Madison Dukes football team was an American football team that represented James Madison University during the 1988 NCAA Division I-AA football season as an independent. In their fourth year under head coach Joe Purzycki, the team compiled a 5–6 record.

== Schedule ==
| Date | Opponent | Site | Result | Attendance | Source |
|---|---|---|---|---|---|
| September 3 | at Navy | Navy–Marine Corps Memorial Stadium; Annapolis, MD | L 14–27 | 21,318 | |
| September 10 | Appalachian State | JMU Stadium; Harrisonburg, VA | L 14–17 | 9,250 | |
| September 17 | at Boston University | Nickerson Field; Boston, MA | W 23–13 | 5,857 | |
| September 24 | No. 17 William & Mary | JMU Stadium; Harrisonburg, VA (rivalry) | L 3–10 | 7,000 | |
| October 1 | Liberty | JMU Stadium; Harrisonburg, VA | W 31–28 | 9,200 | |
| October 15 | at Northeastern | Parsons Field; Brookline, MA | W 29–13 | 2,300 | |
| October 22 | VMI | JMU Stadium; Harrisonburg, VA | W 37–0 | 15,986 | |
| October 29 | at Towson State | Minnegan Stadium; Towson, MD | L 6–34 | 5,136 | |
| November 5 | No. 6 Georgia Southern | JMU Stadium; Harrisonburg, VA | L 13–27 | 10,126 | |
| November 12 | at Richmond | City Stadium; Richmond, VA (rivalry) | W 25–13 | 15,802 | |
| November 19 | at Virginia Tech | Lane Stadium; Blacksburg, VA | L 6–27 | 18,753 | |
Rankings from NCAA Division I-AA Football Committee Poll released prior to the game
