= 1988 McNeese State Cowboys football team =

American college football season

1988 McNeese State Cowboys football
- Conference: Southland Conference
- Record: 6–5 (3–3 Southland)
- Head coach: Sonny Jackson (2nd season)
- Home stadium: Cowboy Stadium

1988 Southland Conference football standings
| | Conf. | | | | | Overall |
| Team | W | | L | | T | W | | L | | T |
|---|---|---|---|---|---|---|---|---|---|---|
| No. 8 Northwestern State $^ | 6 | – | 0 | – | 0 | 10 | – | 3 | – | 0 |
| No. 9 Stephen F. Austin ^ | 5 | – | 1 | – | 0 | 10 | – | 3 | – | 0 |
| No. 10 North Texas ^ | 4 | – | 2 | – | 0 | 8 | – | 4 | – | 0 |
| McNeese State | 3 | – | 3 | – | 0 | 6 | – | 5 | – | 0 |
| Northeast Louisiana | 2 | – | 4 | – | 0 | 5 | – | 6 | – | 0 |
| SW Texas State | 1 | – | 5 | – | 0 | 4 | – | 7 | – | 0 |
| Sam Houston State | 0 | – | 6 | – | 0 | 3 | – | 8 | – | 0 |
$ – Conference champion; ^ – NCAA Division I-AA playoff participant; Rankings from NCAA Division I-AA Football Committee poll

The 1988 McNeese State Cowboys football team was an American football team that represented McNeese State University as a member of the Southland Conference (Southland) during the 1988 NCAA Division I-AA football season. In their second year under head coach Sonny Jackson, the team compiled an overall record of 6–5, with a mark of 3–3 in conference play, and finished fourth in the Southland.

== Schedule ==
| Date | Opponent | Rank | Site | Result | Attendance | Source |
|---|---|---|---|---|---|---|
| September 3 | Mississippi College* | | Cowboy Stadium; Lake Charles, LA | W 6–2 | | |
| September 10 | Northeast Louisiana | | Cowboy Stadium; Lake Charles, LA | W 23–0 | 17,200 | |
| September 17 | Toledo* | | Cowboy Stadium; Lake Charles, LA | W 46–19 | 19,750 | |
| September 24 | at Fresno State* | No. 9 | Bulldog Stadium; Fresno, CA | L 0–49 | 34,503 | |
| October 1 | at Nicholls State* | No. 17 | John L. Guidry Stadium; Thibodaux, LA | L 19–23 | | |
| October 8 | Northwestern State | | Cowboy Stadium; Lake Charles, LA (rivalry) | L 20–25 | | |
| October 15 | at No. 1 North Texas | | Fouts Field; Denton, TX | L 0–37 | 18,560 | |
| October 22 | at Southwest Texas State | | Bobcat Stadium; San Marcos, TX | W 24–21 | | |
| November 5 | Sam Houston State | | Cowboy Stadium; Lake Charles, LA | W 37–0 | | |
| November 12 | at No. 1 Stephen F. Austin | | Homer Bryce Stadium; Nacogdoches, TX | L 3–20 | | |
| November 19 | Lamar* | | Cowboy Stadium; Lake Charles, LA (rivalry) | W 18–17 | | |
*Non-conference game; Rankings from NCAA Division I-AA Football Committee Poll released prior to the game
