= 1988 UMass Minutemen football team =

American college football season

1988 UMass Minutemen football

Yankee Conference co-champion

NCAA Division I-AA First Round, L 17–28 at Eastern Kentucky
- Conference: Yankee Conference
- Record: 8–4 (6–2 Yankee)
- Head coach: Jim Reid (3rd season)
- Home stadium: Warren McGuirk Alumni Stadium

1988 Yankee Conference football standings
	Conf.					Overall
Team	W		L		T	W		L		T
No. T–10 UMass +^	6	–	2	–	0	8	–	4	–	0
No. 15 Delaware +^	6	–	2	–	0	7	–	5	–	0
Connecticut	4	–	4	–	0	7	–	4	–	0
Maine	4	–	4	–	0	7	–	4	–	0
New Hampshire	4	–	4	–	0	6	–	5	–	0
Villanova	4	–	4	–	0	5	–	5	–	1
Boston University	3	–	5	–	0	4	–	7	–	0
Rhode Island	3	–	5	–	0	3	–	8	–	0
Richmond	2	–	6	–	0	4	–	7	–	0
+ – Conference co-champions; ^ – NCAA Division I-AA playoff participant; Rankings from NCAA Division I-AA Football Committee poll

The 1988 UMass Minutemen football team represented the University of Massachusetts Amherst in the 1988 NCAA Division I-AA football season as a member of the Yankee Conference. The team was coached by Jim Reid and played its home games at Warren McGuirk Alumni Stadium in Hadley, Massachusetts. The 1988 season marked the Minutemen's first playoff appearance since their runner-up finish in the 1978 National Championship game. UMass finished the season with a record of 8–4 overall and 6–2 in conference play.

== Schedule ==
Date	Opponent	Rank	Site	Result	Attendance	Source
September 10	No. 14 Maine		McGuirk Stadium; Hadley, MA	W 45–42	12,458	
September 17	at Ball State*		Ball State Stadium; Muncie, IN	L 17–44	9,370	
September 24	at Harvard*		Harvard Stadium; Boston, MA	W 45–28	7,500	
October 1	Boston University		McGuirk Stadium; Hadley, MA	W 44–27	12,840	
October 8	at Rhode Island	No. T–11	Meade Stadium; Kingston, RI	W 26–7	5,117	
October 15	Connecticut	No. 9	McGuirk Stadium; Hadley, MA (rivalry)	L 14–35	14,301	
October 22	at No. 14 Delaware		Delaware Stadium; Newark, DE	L 7–10	22,301	
October 29	Northeastern*		McGuirk Stadium; Hadley, MA	W 21–6	7,240	
November 5	at Richmond		UR Stadium; Richmond, VA	W 26–16	9,026	
November 12	Villanova		McGuirk Stadium; Hadley, MA	W 17–6	5,829	
November 19	at No. 20 New Hampshire	No. 11	Cowell Stadium; Durham, NH (rivalry)	W 64–42	8,650	
November 26	at No. 7 Eastern Kentucky*	No. T–10	Hanger Field; Richmond, KY (NCAA Division I-AA First Round)	L 17–28	4,600	
*Non-conference game; Rankings from NCAA Division I-AA Football Committee Poll released prior to the game
