= 1988 Villanova Wildcats football team =

American college football season

1988 Villanova Wildcats football
- Conference: Yankee Conference
- Record: 5–5–1 (4–4 Yankee)
- Head coach: Andy Talley (4th season)
- Defensive coordinator: Dan MacNeill (1st season)
- Home stadium: Villanova Stadium

1988 Yankee Conference football standings
	Conf.					Overall
Team	W		L		T	W		L		T
No. T–10 UMass +^	6	–	2	–	0	8	–	4	–	0
No. 15 Delaware +^	6	–	2	–	0	7	–	5	–	0
Connecticut	4	–	4	–	0	7	–	4	–	0
Maine	4	–	4	–	0	7	–	4	–	0
New Hampshire	4	–	4	–	0	6	–	5	–	0
Villanova	4	–	4	–	0	5	–	5	–	1
Boston University	3	–	5	–	0	4	–	7	–	0
Rhode Island	3	–	5	–	0	3	–	8	–	0
Richmond	2	–	6	–	0	4	–	7	–	0
+ – Conference co-champions; ^ – NCAA Division I-AA playoff participant; Rankings from NCAA Division I-AA Football Committee poll

The 1988 Villanova Wildcats football team was an American football team that represented the Villanova University as a member of the Yankee Conference during the 1988 NCAA Division I-AA football season. In their fourth year under head coach Andy Talley, the team compiled a 5–5–1 record.

== Schedule ==
Date	Opponent	Rank	Site	Result	Attendance	Source
September 3	Wake Forest*		Villanova Stadium; Villanova, PA	L 11–31	11,624	
September 10	at Bucknell*		Memorial Stadium; Lewisburg, PA	W 30–17	5,800	
September 24	at Boston University		Nickerson Field; Boston, MA	W 31–24	5,153	
October 1	Rhode Island		Villanova Stadium; Villanova, PA	W 20–14	13,400	
October 8	at No. 14 Connecticut		Memorial Stadium; Storrs, CT	W 21–14	5,084	
October 15	No. 19 Delaware	No. 15	Villanova Stadium; Villanova, PA (rivalry)	L 7–10	13,400	
October 22	at No. T–17 William & Mary*	No. 20	Cary Field; Williamsburg, VA	T 14–14	10,016	
October 29	Richmond	No. 19	Villanova Stadium; Villanova, PA	W 45–6	13,400	
November 5	at New Hampshire	No. 15	Cowell Stadium; Durham, NH	L 7–58	5,016	
November 12	at UMass		McGuirk Stadium; Hadley, MA	L 6–17	5,829	
November 19	Maine		Villanova Stadium; Villanova, PA	L 17–20	9,437	
*Non-conference game; Rankings from NCAA Division I-AA Football Committee Poll released prior to the game
