= 1988 Howard Bison football team =

American college football season

1988 Howard Bison football
- Conference: Mid-Eastern Athletic Conference
- Record: 7–4 (3–3 MEAC)
- Head coach: Willie Jeffries (5th season)
- Home stadium: William H. Greene Stadium

1988 Mid-Eastern Athletic Conference football standings
	Conf.					Overall
Team	W		L		T	W		L		T
Bethune–Cookman $	4	–	2	–	0	5	–	6	–	0
No. 18 Florida A&M	4	–	2	–	0	6	–	4	–	1
Delaware State	4	–	2	–	0	5	–	5	–	0
Howard	3	–	3	–	0	7	–	4	–	0
South Carolina State	3	–	3	–	0	4	–	7	–	0
North Carolina A&T	2	–	4	–	0	2	–	9	–	0
Morgan State	0	–	6	–	0	1	–	10	–	0
$ – Conference champion; Both Delaware State and Florida A&M received forfeit losses for the same game. Bethune–Cookman was awarded the conference title, although the MEAC website lists Bethune, Delaware State, and Florida A&M as co-champions.; Rankings from NCAA Division I-AA Football Committee poll

The 1988 Howard Bison football team represented Howard University as a member of the Mid-Eastern Athletic Conference (MEAC) during the 1988 NCAA Division I-AA football season. Led by fifth-year head coach Willie Jeffries, the Bison compiled an overall record of 7–4, with a conference record of 3–3, and finished tied for fourth in the MEAC.

== Schedule ==
Date	Opponent	Site	Result	Attendance	Source
September 3	at Morehouse*	B. T. Harvey Stadium; Atlanta, GA	W 47–21		
September 10	vs. Grambling State*	Giants Stadium; East Rutherford, NJ (Whitney Young Memorial Classic)	W 35–20	25,356	
September 17	Bethune–Cookman	William H. Greene Stadium; Washington, DC	W 41–26	12,500	
September 24	at South Carolina State	Oliver C. Dawson Stadium; Orangeburg, SC	L 13–21	18,243	
October 8	Towson State*	William H. Greene Stadium; Washington, DC	L 28–31		
October 15	at Virginia State*	Rogers Stadium; Ettrick, VA	W 34–21	5,100	
October 22	North Carolina A&T	William H. Greene Stadium; Washington, DC	W 37–8		
October 29	District of Columbia*	William H. Greene Stadium; Washington, DC	W 49–0		
November 5	at Florida A&M	Bragg Memorial Stadium; Tallahassee, FL	L 17–34	30,829	
November 12	Morgan State	William H. Greene Stadium; Washington, DC (rivalry)	W 35–13	8,167	
November 19	Delaware State	William H. Greene Stadium; Washington, DC	L 21–28	3,857	
*Non-conference game
