= Eldonta Osborne =

American football player (born 1967)

No. 90
- Position: Linebacker

Personal information
- Born: August 12, 1967 (age 59); Jonesboro, Louisiana, U.S.
- Listed height: 6 ft 0 in (1.83 m)
- Listed weight: 226 lb (103 kg)

Career information
- High school: Hodge (Jonesboro)
- College: Louisiana Tech
- NFL draft: 1990: undrafted

Career history
- Phoenix Cardinals (1990); Shreveport Pirates (1994–1995)
- Stats at Pro Football Reference

Eldonta Osborne (born August 12, 1967) is an American former professional football player who was a linebacker in the National Football League (NFL) and Canadian Football League (CFL). He played college football for the Louisiana Tech Bulldogs. He played in the NFL for the Phoenix Cardinals in 1990 before playing for the CFL's Shreveport Pirates from 1994 to 1995.
