= 1988 NCAA Division I-AA football season =

American college football season

1988 NCAA Division I-AA season

Regular season
- Number of teams: 88
- Duration: August–November
- Payton Award: Dave Meggett (RB, Towson State)

Playoff
- Duration: November 26–December 17
- Championship date: December 17, 1988
- Championship site: Holt Arena; Pocatello, Idaho
- Champion: Furman

NCAA Division I-AA football seasons
- «1987 1989»

The 1988 NCAA Division I-AA football season, part of college football in the United States organized by the National Collegiate Athletic Association at the Division I-AA level, began in August 1988, and concluded with the 1988 NCAA Division I-AA Football Championship Game on December 17, 1988, at Holt Arena in Pocatello, Idaho. The Furman Paladins won their first I-AA championship, defeating the Georgia Southern Eagles by a score of 17−12.

== Conference changes and new programs ==
School	1987 Conference	1988 Conference
Florida A&M	I-AA Independent	MEAC
Liberty	D-II Independent	I-AA Independent
Tennessee State	I-AA Independent	Ohio Valley
Villanova	I-AA Independent	Yankee
Youngstown State	Ohio Valley	I-AA Independent

== Conference standings ==
1988 Big Sky Conference football standings
	Conf.					Overall
Team	W		L		T	W		L		T
No. 1 Idaho $^	7	–	1	–	0	11	–	2	–	0
No. 16 Montana ^	6	–	2	–	0	8	–	4	–	0
No. 12 Boise State ^	5	–	3	–	0	8	–	4	–	0
Nevada	4	–	4	–	0	7	–	4	–	0
Northern Arizona	4	–	4	–	0	6	–	5	–	0
Weber State	4	–	4	–	0	5	–	6	–	0
Montana State	4	–	4	–	0	4	–	7	–	0
Eastern Washington	2	–	6	–	0	2	–	8	–	1
Idaho State	0	–	8	–	0	0	–	11	–	0
$ – Conference champion; ^ – NCAA Division I-AA playoff participant; Rankings from NCAA Division I-AA Poll

1988 Colonial League football standings
	Conf.					Overall
Team	W		L		T	W		L		T
Lafayette $	5	–	0	–	0	8	–	2	–	1
No. 19 Holy Cross	3	–	1	–	0	9	–	2	–	0
Lehigh	2	–	3	–	0	6	–	5	–	0
Bucknell	2	–	3	–	0	3	–	7	–	0
Colgate	2	–	3	–	0	2	–	9	–	0
Davidson	0	–	4	–	0	0	–	10	–	0
$ – Conference champion; Rankings from NCAA Division I-AA Football Committee poll

1988 Gateway Collegiate Athletic Conference football standings
	Conf.					Overall
Team	W		L		T	W		L		T
No. 3 Western Illinois $^	6	–	0	–	0	10	–	2	–	0
Southwest Missouri State	4	–	2	–	0	5	–	5	–	0
Indiana State	4	–	2	–	0	5	–	6	–	0
Northern Iowa	3	–	3	–	0	5	–	6	–	0
Eastern Illinois	2	–	4	–	0	5	–	6	–	0
Southern Illinois	2	–	4	–	0	4	–	7	–	0
Illinois State	0	–	6	–	0	1	–	10	–	0
$ – Conference champion; ^ – NCAA Division I-AA playoff participant; Rankings from NCAA Division I-AA Football Committee poll

1988 Ivy League football standings
	Conf.					Overall
Team	W		L		T	W		L		T
Penn +	6	–	1	–	0	9	–	1	–	0
Cornell +	6	–	1	–	0	7	–	2	–	1
Princeton	4	–	3	–	0	6	–	4	–	0
Dartmouth	4	–	3	–	0	5	–	5	–	0
Yale	3	–	3	–	1	3	–	6	–	1
Columbia	2	–	5	–	0	2	–	8	–	0
Harvard	2	–	5	–	0	2	–	8	–	0
Brown	0	–	6	–	1	0	–	9	–	1
+ – Conference co-champions

1988 Mid-Eastern Athletic Conference football standings
	Conf.					Overall
Team	W		L		T	W		L		T
Bethune–Cookman $	4	–	2	–	0	5	–	6	–	0
No. 18 Florida A&M	4	–	2	–	0	6	–	4	–	1
Delaware State	4	–	2	–	0	5	–	5	–	0
Howard	3	–	3	–	0	7	–	4	–	0
South Carolina State	3	–	3	–	0	4	–	7	–	0
North Carolina A&T	2	–	4	–	0	2	–	9	–	0
Morgan State	0	–	6	–	0	1	–	10	–	0
$ – Conference champion; Both Delaware State and Florida A&M received forfeit losses for the same game. Bethune–Cookman was awarded the conference title, although the MEAC website lists Bethune, Delaware State, and Florida A&M as co-champions.; Rankings from NCAA Division I-AA Football Committee poll

1988 Ohio Valley Conference football standings
	Conf.					Overall
Team	W		L		T	W		L		T
No. 7 Eastern Kentucky $^	6	–	0	–	0	11	–	3	–	0
No. 17 Middle Tennessee	4	–	2	–	0	7	–	4	–	0
Murray State	4	–	2	–	0	4	–	6	–	0
Tennessee State	2	–	4	–	0	3	–	7	–	1
Austin Peay	2	–	4	–	0	3	–	8	–	0
Morehead State	2	–	4	–	0	3	–	8	–	0
Tennessee Tech	1	–	5	–	0	1	–	10	–	0
$ – Conference champion; ^ – NCAA Division I-AA playoff participant; Rankings from NCAA Division I-AA Football Committee poll

1988 Southern Conference football standings
	Conf.					Overall
Team	W		L		T	W		L		T
No. 4 Furman +^	6	–	1	–	0	13	–	2	–	0
No. 6 Marshall +^	6	–	1	–	0	11	–	2	–	0
No. 14 The Citadel ^	5	–	2	–	0	8	–	4	–	0
Appalachian State	4	–	3	–	0	6	–	4	–	1
Chattanooga	3	–	3	–	0	4	–	7	–	0
VMI	1	–	5	–	0	2	–	9	–	0
East Tennessee State	1	–	6	–	0	3	–	8	–	0
Western Carolina	1	–	6	–	0	2	–	9	–	0
+ – Conference co-champions; ^ – NCAA Division I-AA playoff participant; Rankings from NCAA Division I-AA Football Committee poll

1988 Southland Conference football standings
	Conf.					Overall
Team	W		L		T	W		L		T
No. 8 Northwestern State $^	6	–	0	–	0	10	–	3	–	0
No. 9 Stephen F. Austin ^	5	–	1	–	0	10	–	3	–	0
No. 10 North Texas ^	4	–	2	–	0	8	–	4	–	0
McNeese State	3	–	3	–	0	6	–	5	–	0
Northeast Louisiana	2	–	4	–	0	5	–	6	–	0
SW Texas State	1	–	5	–	0	4	–	7	–	0
Sam Houston State	0	–	6	–	0	3	–	8	–	0
$ – Conference champion; ^ – NCAA Division I-AA playoff participant; Rankings from NCAA Division I-AA Football Committee poll

1988 Southwestern Athletic Conference football standings
	Conf.					Overall
Team	W		L		T	W		L		T
No. 5 Jackson State $^	7	–	0	–	0	8	–	1	–	2
No. 20 Grambling State	5	–	2	–	0	8	–	3	–	0
Alabama State	4	–	3	–	0	7	–	3	–	0
Alcorn State	4	–	3	–	0	6	–	4	–	0
Southern	4	–	3	–	0	6	–	5	–	0
Prairie View A&M	3	–	4	–	0	5	–	5	–	0
Mississippi Valley State	1	–	6	–	0	3	–	8	–	0
Texas Southern	0	–	7	–	0	0	–	11	–	0
$ – Conference champion; ^ – NCAA Division I-AA playoff participant; Rankings from NCAA Division I-AA Football Committee poll

1988 Yankee Conference football standings
	Conf.					Overall
Team	W		L		T	W		L		T
No. T–10 UMass +^	6	–	2	–	0	8	–	4	–	0
No. 15 Delaware +^	6	–	2	–	0	7	–	5	–	0
Connecticut	4	–	4	–	0	7	–	4	–	0
Maine	4	–	4	–	0	7	–	4	–	0
New Hampshire	4	–	4	–	0	6	–	5	–	0
Villanova	4	–	4	–	0	5	–	5	–	1
Boston University	3	–	5	–	0	4	–	7	–	0
Rhode Island	3	–	5	–	0	3	–	8	–	0
Richmond	2	–	6	–	0	4	–	7	–	0
+ – Conference co-champions; ^ – NCAA Division I-AA playoff participant; Rankings from NCAA Division I-AA Football Committee poll

1988 NCAA Division I-AA independents football standings
	Conf.			Overall
Team	W	L	T	W		L		T
No. 2 Georgia Southern ^		–		10	–	2	–	0
No. 13 Western Kentucky ^		–		9	–	4	–	0
Liberty		–		8	–	3	–	0
Nicholls State		–		7	–	4	–	0
William & Mary		–		6	–	4	–	1
Towson State		–		5	–	5	–	0
Arkansas State		–		5	–	6	–	0
James Madison		–		5	–	6	–	0
Louisiana Tech		–		4	–	7	–	0
Northeastern		–		4	–	7	–	0
Youngstown State		–		4	–	7	–	0
Lamar		–		3	–	8	–	0
^ – NCAA Division I-AA playoff participant; Rankings from NCAA Division I-AA Football Committee poll

== Conference champions ==
Conference Champions

Big Sky Conference – Idaho
Colonial League – Lafayette
Gateway Collegiate Athletic Conference – Western Illinois
Ivy League – Cornell and Penn
Mid-Eastern Athletic Conference – Bethune-Cookman, Delaware State, and Florida A&M
Ohio Valley Conference – Eastern Kentucky
Southern Conference – Furman and Marshall
Southland Conference – Northwestern State
Southwestern Athletic Conference – Jackson State
Yankee Conference – Delaware and Massachusetts

== Postseason ==
The top four teams were seeded, and thus assured of home games in the first round.

=== NCAA Division I-AA playoff bracket ===
First Round; November 26; Campus sites
Montana	19
(1) Idaho*	38
Northwestern State	22
Boise State*	13
Delaware	7
(4) Furman*	21
North Texas	0
Marshall*	7
The Citadel	20
(2) Georgia Southern*	38
Jackson State	0
Stephen F. Austin*	24
Western Kentucky	35
(3) Western Illinois*	32
UMass	17
Eastern Kentucky*	28

Quarterfinals; December 3 Campus sites
(1) Idaho*	38
Northwestern State	30
(4) Furman	13
Marshall*	9
(2) Georgia Southern*	27
Stephen F. Austin	6
Western Kentucky	24
Eastern Kentucky*	41

Semifinals; December 10; Campus sites
(1) Idaho	7
(4) Furman*	38
(2) Georgia Southern*	21
Eastern Kentucky	17

National Championship Game; December 17; Holt Arena; Pocatello, Idaho
(4) Furman	17
(2) Georgia Southern	12

* Next to team name denotes host institution
