= 1988 NCAA Division I-AA football rankings =

The 1988 NCAA Division I-AA football rankings are from the NCAA Division I-AA football committee. This is for the 1988 season.

== Legend ==
	Increase in ranking
	Decrease in ranking
	Not ranked previous week
(#–#)	Win–loss record
(Italics)	Number of first place votes
т	Tied with team above or below also with this symbol

== NCAA Division I-AA Football Committee poll ==
	Preseason	Week 1 Sept 20	Week 2 Sept 27	Week 3 Oct 4	Week 4 Oct 11	Week 5 Oct 18	Week 6 Oct 25	Week 7 Nov 1	Week 8 Nov 8	Week 9 Nov 15	Week 10 (Final) Nov 22	
1.	Holy Cross (3)	North Texas (2–0) (4)	North Texas (2–1) (3)	North Texas (3–1) (4)	North Texas (4–1) (4)	North Texas (5–1) (4)	North Texas (6–1) (4)	Marshall (8–0) (4)	Stephen F. Austin (8–1) (4)	Stephen F. Austin (9–1) (4)	Idaho (9–1) (4)	1.
2.	Northeast Louisiana (1)	Appalachian State (2–0)	Appalachian State (3–0) (1)	Western Illinois (5–0)	Western Illinois (6–0)	Western Illinois (7–0)	Marshall (7–0)	Western Illinois (9–0)	Idaho (7–1)	Idaho (8–1)	Georgia Southern (9–2)	2.
3.	Appalachian State т	Marshall (3–0)	Marshall (4–0)	Appalachian State (3–1)	Appalachian State (4–1)	Marshall (6–0)	Western Illinois (8–0)	Stephen F. Austin (7–1)	Georgia Southern (7–2)	Georgia Southern (8–2)	Western Illinois (10–1)	3.
4.	Eastern Kentucky т	Western Illinois (3–0)	Western Illinois (4–0) т	Marshall (4–0)	Marshall (5–0)	Idaho (5–1)	Idaho (6–1)	Idaho (6–1)	Western Illinois (9–1)	Western Illinois (10–1)	Furman (9–2)	4.
5.	North Texas	Idaho (2–0)	New Hampshire (3–0) т	Nevada (4–0)	Lafayette (5–0) т	Western Kentucky (5–1)	Western Kentucky (6–1)	Western Kentucky (7–1)	Furman (7–2)	Furman (8–2)	Jackson State (8–0–2)	5.
6.	Georgia Southern	Georgia Southern (3–0) т	Montana (4–0)	Lafayette (4–0)	Nevada (5–0) т	Georgia Southern (4–2)	Georgia Southern (5–2)	Georgia Southern (6–2)	Marshall (8–1)	Jackson State (7–0–2)	Marshall (10–1)	6.
7.	Richmond	New Hampshire (2–0) т	Middle Tennessee State (3–1)	Georgia Southern (3–1) т	Idaho (4–1)	Lafayette (5–1)	Lafayette (6–1)	North Texas (6–2)	Northwestern State (8–1)	Marshall (9–1)	Eastern Kentucky (9–2)	7.
8.	Northern Iowa	Eastern Kentucky (1–1)	Lafayette (3–0)	Idaho (3–1) т	Western Kentucky (4–1)	Nevada (5–1)	Middle Tennessee State (6–2)	Middle Tennessee State (6–2)	Eastern Kentucky (7–2)	Eastern Kentucky (8–2)	Northwestern State (9–2)	8.
9.	Idaho	McNeese State (3–0)	Northeast Louisiana (3–1)	William & Mary (3–1)	UMass (4–1)	Middle Tennessee State (5–2)	Stephen F. Austin (6–1)	Delaware (6–2)	Connecticut (7–2)	The Citadel (8–2)	Stephen F. Austin (9–2)	9.
10.	Marshall	Northern Iowa (1–1)	Nevada (3–0)	Western Kentucky (3–1)	Georgia Southern (3–2)	Furman (5–2)	Furman (5–2)	Furman (6–2)	Jackson State (6–0–2)	Northwestern State (8–2)	UMass (8–3) т	10.
11.	Jackson State	Boise State (3–0)	Georgia Southern (3–1)	Furman (4–1) т	Montana (5–1)	Stephen F. Austin (5–1)	Appalachian State (5–2)	Northwestern State (7–1)	Western Kentucky (7–2)	UMass (7–3)	North Texas (8–3) т	11.
12.	Western Illinois	Lafayette (2–0)	Idaho (2–1) т	UMass (3–1) т (Note: In the actual printed polls, UMass was listed as Massachusetts)	Middle Tennessee State (4–2)	Montana (6–1)	Delaware (5–2)	Eastern Kentucky (6–2)	The Citadel (7–2)	North Texas (7–3)	Boise State (8–3)	12.
13.	Nicholls State	Eastern Illinois (3–0) т	William & Mary (3–1) т	Montana (4–1)	Boise State (4–1)	Appalachian State (4–2)	Northwestern State (6–1)	Jackson State (5–0–2)	Delaware (6–3)	Boise State (8–2)	Western Kentucky (8–3)	13.
14.	Maine	Howard (3–0) т	Western Kentucky (2–1)	Connecticut (3–1)	Stephen F. Austin (4–1)	Delaware (4–2)	Eastern Kentucky (5–2)	Connecticut (6–2)	North Texas (6–3)	Florida A&M (7–1–1) т	The Citadel (8–3)	14.
15.	Middle Tennessee State	Northeast Louisiana (2–1)	Furman (3–1)	Boise State (4–1)	Villanova (4–1)	Eastern Kentucky (4–2)	Jackson State (5–0–2)	Villanova (5–2–1)	Boise State (7–2)	Penn (9–0) т	Delaware (7–4)	15.
16.	James Madison	Montana (3–0)	Connecticut (2–1)	Middle Tennessee State (3–2)	Eastern Kentucky (3–2) т	Northwestern State (5–1)	Connecticut (5–2)	Appalachian State (5–3)	Appalachian State (6–3)	Western Kentucky (7–3)	Montana (8–3)	16.
17.	Western Kentucky	William & Mary (2–1)	McNeese State (3–1)	Stephen F. Austin (4–1)	Jackson State (3–0–2) т	Jackson State (4–0–2) т	Nevada (5–2)	Boise State (6–2)	Middle Tennessee State (7–2)	Connecticut (7–3)	Middle Tennessee State (7–4)	17.
18.	Northwestern State т (Note: In the actual printed polls, Northwestern State was listed as Northwestern Louisiana)	Furman (2–1)	Jackson State (2–0–1)	Eastern Kentucky (2–2)	Northwestern State (4–1)	William & Mary (4–2) т	The Citadel (5–2)	Lafayette (6–1–1)	Montana (8–2)	Grambling State (8–2)	Florida A&M (7–2–1)	18.
19.	Nevada т	Maine (1–1)	Boise State (3–1)	New Hampshire (3–1) т	Delaware (3–2)	Grambling (5–1)	Villanova (4–2–1)	The Citadel (6–2)	Florida A&M (7–1–1) т	Montana (8–3)	Holy Cross (9–2)	19.
20.	Connecticut	Middle Tennessee State (2–1)	Eastern Kentucky (1–2)	Northwestern State (3–1) т	Furman (4–2)	Villanova (4–2)	William & Mary (4–2–1)	Montana (7–2)	Penn (8–0) т	New Hampshire (6–4)	Grambling State (8–2)	20.
	Preseason	Week 1 Sept 20	Week 2 Sept 27	Week 3 Oct 4	Week 4 Oct 11	Week 5 Oct 18	Week 6 Oct 25	Week 7 Nov 1	Week 8 Nov 8	Week 9 Nov 15	Week 10 (Final) Nov 22	
		Dropped: 1 Holy Cross; 7 Richmond; 11 Jackson State; 13 Nicholls State; 16 James Madison; 17 Western Kentucky; 18 Northwestern State; 19 Nevada; 20 Connecticut	Dropped: 10 Northern Iowa; 13 Eastern Illinois; 14 Howard; 19 Maine	Dropped: 9 Northeast Louisiana; 17 McNeese State; 18 Jackson State	Dropped: 9 William & Mary; 14 Connecticut; 19 New Hampshire	Dropped: 9 UMass; 13 Boise State	Dropped: 12 Montana; 19 Grambling	Dropped: 17 Nevada; 20 William & Mary	Dropped: 15 Villanova; 18 Lafayette	Dropped: 13 Delaware; 16 Appalachian State; 17 Middle Tennessee State	Dropped: 15 Penn; 17 Connecticut; 20 New Hampshire	
