= Timeline of the University of Idaho =

On January 30, 1889, Governor Edward Stevenson of the Idaho Territory signed the territorial legislature's Council Bill No. 20, championed by attorney Willis Sweet and legislator John W. Brigham, which officially established the UI as the upcoming state's land-grant institution. Nearly four years later, the university opened for classes on October 3, 1892. The choice of location for the University of Idaho was an "Olive Branch of Peace" by Gov. Stevenson for his actions in stymieing the nearly successful effort to detach the north Idaho Panhandle and join the state of Washington.

== 1800s ==
- 1889 – Beta Sigma established as first sorority
- 1892 – University opens, first day of classes on October 3
- 1896 – first four undergraduate degrees awarded to:
  - Stella Maude Allen, Florence May Corbett, Charles Luther Kirtley, and Arthur Prentis Adair. – photo
- 1898 – first graduate degree awarded
  - UI Alumni Association established
- 1899 – UI opens first summer school in Northwest – June 21 – photo

== 1900s ==
- 1901 – College of Agriculture established
  - original Engineering Building opens (originally Applied Science, then Mines, then Engineering) – (photo 1) – (photo 2)
    – demolished in 1951 (unsafe), on site of present Niccolls Building (Home Economics, opened 1952)
- 1902 – Ridenbaugh Hall completed – (photo 1) – (photo 2)
  - Department of Domestic Science (later Home Economics) established; first in Pacific Northwest – June 11 (photo)
- 1904 – present Art and Architecture South building completed; originally a gymnasium & armory – (photo)
  became Women's Gym in 1928, remodeled for Art and Architecture in 1976
- 1905 – First National Greek organization in Idaho (Kappa Sigma), arrives on September 30
- 1906 – original Administration Building (photo 1) (photo-2) burns down – March 30 – (photo) – remains later dynamited – (photo)
  - Metallurgical Lab completed, became Mines (1950), Psychology (1961), Art and Architecture (2001) – Pine St. – (photo, left) – (photo, right)
  - Assay Building completed – (later Geology), 1955–84 gallery & museum, demolished in 1984 for Life Sciences North (Gibb Hall)
- 1907 – Morrill Hall completed – (photo 1) – (photo 2) – financed with insurance funds from destroyed Administration Building
  – (originally for Agriculture, then Forestry in 1950) – Idaho Ave. at Pine St.
  - College of Engineering established in cooperation with the College of Mines
  - construction of new Administration Building begins
- 1908 – Olmsted Brothers develop master plan for UI campus
- 1909 – new Administration Building opens (Tudor Gothic) – (later photo)
- 1910 – Arboretum begun by Charles H. Shattuck, head of forestry department – (photo)
- 1911 – Theodore Roosevelt spoke at the new Administration Building on April 9 – (photo 1) – (photo 2) on a platform built of Palouse wheat
  - College of Engineering formally established – October 27
- 1912 – North wing of Administration Building completed – (photo 1) – (photo 2) – (photo 3) – (photo 4)
  includes auditorium – (first two floors)
  - Hec Edmundson finishes seventh in 800 m at the Olympics
- 1914 – Football games moved to MacLean Field, west of Administration Building; previously at Main and E streets (SW corner) in north Moscow
- 1916 – South wing of Administration Building initially completed, extended in 1936 for library
- 1920 – School of Education established – June 7
  - Lindley Hall (first dormitory) opens in September – occupied site east of Life Sciences North (Gibb Hall),
    SW corner of Idaho & Ash; condemned in 1971, demolished in 1973
- 1922 – UI joins Pacific Coast Conference – member until mid-1959 when PCC disbands
- 1923 – current Continuing Education Building completed; originally Forney Hall (women's dorm) – (photo 1) – (photo 2)
- 1924 – current Life Sciences South building completed, originally "Science Building" – (photo) – (photo-left)
- 1925 – School of Business created; first dean is Harrison Dale.
- 1927 – current Alumni Center completed, originally Hays Hall (women's dormitory) – (photo)
  - Football team ties for PCC title
  - current steam plant building completed – northeast corner of 6th and Line St.
- 1928 – Memorial Gymnasium completed – honors state's World War I service – (photo 1) – (photo 2) – (photo 3)
- 1930 – fourth floor added to Morrill Hall
  - Fight song "Go, Vandals, Go" composed by freshman class vice president J. Morris O'Donnell
- 1936 – Student Union Building (SUB) established after purchase of Blue Bucket Inn – (photo – 1924 construction) – (photo – 1950 addition)
  - Student Health Center completed, originally "Infirmary" – (photo)
  - Brink Hall opened; originally Willis Sweet Hall (men's dorm), then Faculty Office Complex (FOC) East, until renamed in 1982.
  - south wing (1916) of Administration Building (1909) extended for library expansion – (UI Library completed in 1957)
  - total enrollment at 2,568 in October
- 1937 – UI Golf Course opens (nine holes) (photo 1938) – second nine holes opens in 1970 (five holes at NW, four at E)
  - Neale Stadium completed – (earthen horseshoe – wood bleachers) (photo 1) – (photo 2), on site of Kibbie Dome
- 1938 – Eleanor Roosevelt speaks at Memorial Gym – March 26
  - Phinney Hall completed; originally Chrisman Hall (men's dorm) – (photo); FOC West until 1987.
- 1940 – total enrollment at 2,686
- 1942 – Gauss ME Laboratory completed – southeast corner of 6th and Line St.
  – (original Kirtley Lab #1: Charles L. Kirtley was first UI engineering graduate, in first class of 1896, (photo), later a physician)
- 1943 – Varsity football cancelled due to lack of turnout in fall, returns in 1945
  - Food Research Building completed – (orig. Dairy Building, photo), west side of Morrill Hall, NE corner Line St. & Idaho Ave.
- 1945 – student radio station KUOI (655 KHz) goes on the air – November; became 89.3 MHz in 1968
  - total enrollment at 1,450 in fall
- 1946 – Basketball team wins its final Northern Division title in PCC and first since 1923, loses deciding game in title series at California
- 1948 – inaugural Borah Symposium on foreign policy
  - total enrollment of 3,683 in fall
- 1950 – new Engineering Building (classrooms) – Janssen Engineering Classroom Building, named for Allen S. Janssen, Dean, College of Engineering (1946–1967), in 1951
  - Agricultural Science building completed
  - Johnson Electrical Engineering Laboratory completed – (originally Kirtley Lab #2)
  - Administration Building Annex completed, later incorporated into Albertson (2002)
- 1951 – Music building completed – (photo) – (renamed for Lionel Hampton in 1987) –
  - original Mines, then Engineering Building, (1901) is demolished (unsafe) – (current site of Niccolls (Home Economics))
  - resident undergraduate fees: $47.50 per semester
- 1952 – Home Economics building completed – (now Niccolls, photo) on site of old Engineering Building. (1901–51, photo)
  - New "I" water tower is installed (photo) 500,000 US gallons (1,900 m^{3})
    - old tower (1916) (photo) at 60,000 US gallons (230 m^{3}) was directly east; relocated to the UI farm
- 1954 – boxing dropped as a varsity sport in June – (national co-champs with Gonzaga in 1950)
  - Football team defeats Palouse neighbor Washington State, first win over Cougars in 29 years
- 1955 – Gault-Upham Halls (men's dorms) dedicated – October 15 (demolished in 2003)
- 1956 – Gault Hall arson – three fatalities, 4th floor – October 19 – (photo)
  - Arsonist was reporter for UI student newspaper Argonaut, responsible for other campus fires:
    convicted of second-degree murder and sentenced to 25 years, paroled in 1968, & died in 1980.
  - total enrollment at 3,674 in fall
- 1957 – UI Library completed – (photo) – dedicated Nov 2 – on former site of tennis courts – (library was housed in south wing of Administration Building)
  - Park Village Apartments completed (married and graduate housing) – 3rd and Home St. – demolished 2002
- 1958 – Two Vandals selected in top 50 of 1958 NFL draft: Jerry Kramer (39th) and Wayne Walker (45th)
- 1959 – Pacific Coast Conference disbands in spring; UI independent for four years, until the Big Sky Conference forms in 1963
  - total enrollment at 3,906 in October
- 1960 – resident undergraduate fees: $64.50 per semester; non-residents added $125.
- 1961 – College of Mines building completed – (photo) – north of Morrill Hall
- 1962 – UI awards its first doctoral degree in education to Florence Dorothy Aller (counseling and guidance)
- 1963 – Wallace Complex dormitories (two south wings, four floors each) and cafeteria completed
  - Basketball team packs Northwest gyms and goes 20–6 with center Gus Johnson
  - UI joins the new Big Sky Conference as a charter member,
    – retains university (later Division I) status for football with its non-conference schedule (all D-I) through 1977 (except for 1967 and 1968)
  - campus radio station KUID-FM (91.7 MHz) goes on the air
  - resident undergraduate fees: $82 per semester, non-residents added $155
- 1964 – Physical Sciences building completed – (renamed for Malcolm Renfrew in 1985)
  - Baseball wins inaugural Big Sky title
- 1965 – University Classroom Center (UCC) completed, east of library – closed 2003
  reconfigured as Teaching & Learning Center, reopened 2005
  - Third wing (NE, 6 floors) of Wallace Complex dormitory completed
  - campus KUID-TV (Ch.12) goes on the air – Idaho Public Television takes over station in 1982
  - visitor information center opens at north entrance – (current police substation) – 3rd and Line St.
  - UI joins Big Sky for football after six seasons as independent, but retains university division status
  - enrollment at 4,817 in February
  - resident undergraduate fees: $100.50 per semester, non-residents added $190
  - Ernest Hartung becomes 12th UI president in August
- 1966 – Art and Architecture (North) building completed (photo)
  - Baseball wins second Big Sky title and advances to District 7 finals (Sweet Sixteen)
    - final season at MacLean Field (College of Education construction)
- 1967 – President's Residence (S. side of Shattuck Arboretum) completed
  - Wallace Complex dormitory's fourth and final wing (NW (Gooding), six floors) completed
  - St. Augustine's Catholic Center opens – February – east of SUB
  - Baseball wins consecutive Big Sky titles, third in four years.
    - New baseball field opens in April, became Guy Wicks Field (dedicated 1969)
  - NCAA downgrades UI football program, from university division to college division (two seasons)
- 1968 – Buchanan Engineering Laboratory (BEL) completed – (CE, ChE, AgE, EE) – dedicated in May 1969
  - inaugural annual UI jazz festival – February – (renamed Lionel Hampton Jazz Festival in 1985)
  - student radio station becomes KUOI-FM (89.3 MHz) at ten watts – November; (was 660 KHz)
  - resident undergraduate fees: $143 per semester, non-residents added $250
- 1969 – College of Education building completed – built on infield of MacLean baseball field
  - Theophilus Tower (12-floor dormitory) completed (twin tower was cancelled)
  - Golf course's new clubhouse is completed
  - Baseball wins fourth Big Sky title and advances to District 7 finals (Sweet Sixteen); falls to eventual national champion Arizona State
  - UI Wilderness Research Center established at Taylor Ranch field station,
    located in the Idaho Primitive Area (now the Frank Church-River of No Return Wilderness)
  - NCAA restores UI football to university division after two seasons in college division
  - Neale Stadium (1937) is condemned before football season; destroyed by arson after the season in November,
    – UI played its two Palouse home games at WSU's Rogers Field
  - total enrollment at 6,343 in fall
- 1970 – Swim Center (photo) and Women's Gymnasium (P.E. Building) completed – (former center and right field of MacLean Field (baseball))
  - fire destroys south grandstand of WSU's Rogers Field in April, WSU plays all its home football games
    at Spokane's Joe Albi Stadium, UI remains at Rogers Field with reduced capacity.
  - Navy ROTC building (1942) firebombed in May (photo), day after Kent State shootings.
  - South Hill Apartments opened – (married student housing) – first phase
  - second nine holes at ASUI Golf Course (1937) opens in August (five holes at northwest, four at east)
- 1971 – College of Forestry Building completed (Natural Resources – 2000) – southwest corner of 6th and Line St.
  - addition to Agricultural Science Building (1950) is completed
  - academic calendar begins two weeks earlier (September 2), with fall semester finals in December, instead of January
  - new concrete football stadium opens October 9 with natural grass field, enclosed in 1975 to become Kibbie Dome;
    football team posts best record (8–3) to date and wins Big Sky title
  - resident undergraduate fees: $173 per semester, non-residents added $400
- 1972 – Tartan Turf, similar to AstroTurf, installed in outdoor football stadium; new outdoor track facility holds first meet
  - Skiing is dropped as a varsity sport in October
  - full-time enrollment (Moscow) at 7,118 in fall
  - UI president's salary increased to $31,400, highest on state payroll.
- 1973 – College of Law Building completed, renamed in 1984 for Albert R. Menard
  - Idaho is admitted to PCAA, request to leave the Big Sky Conference is denied by state board of education
  - Lindley Hall (first dormitory – 1920) is demolished, was condemned in 1971 (east of Gibb Hall)
- 1974 – "Performing Arts Center" opens in April; renamed for President Hartung in September 1977
  - Big Sky Conference drops conference competition in five sports (baseball, skiing, golf, tennis, and swimming) in May
- 1975 – new "Idaho Stadium" (1971) is enclosed after four years to become the Kibbie Dome – September
  - arched roof and vertical end-walls completed for football home opener vs. Idaho State – September 27
  - resident undergraduate fees: $190 per semester, non-residents added $500
- 1976 – first basketball game and track meet in Kibbie Dome – January 21 and 24
  - full-time enrollment (Moscow) at 6,517 in fall
  - Football team goes 7–4; senior center John Yarno named AP All-American,
    Yarno appears on Bob Hope's Christmas show (NBC) on December 13
- 1977 – Richard Gibb becomes 13th UI president in July
  - Student radio station KUOI-FM (89.3 MHz) becomes stereo, boosts power from ten to fifty watts
- 1978 – UI football descends to the new Division I-AA (Big Sky football moves up from Division II).
  - alumnus Don Monson (1955) hired as head coach of basketball team in August
  - resident undergraduate fees: $219 per semester, non-residents added $600
- 1979 – total enrollment at 8,698 in fall.
- 1980 – Baseball is dropped as a varsity sport in May, after over eighty years
  - resident undergraduate fees: $245 per semester, non-residents added $900
- 1981 – Basketball team wins first Big Sky title and advances to NCAA tournament, finishes at 25–4.
  - College of Art and Architecture is formed; first dean is Paul Blanton.
  - Computer Science Department is formed.
  - Dennis Erickson, hired in December, begins collegiate head coaching career at UI (1982–85)
- 1982 – Basketball team ranked sixth, advances to NCAA Sweet Sixteen in March, finishes at 27–3.
  Don Monson named national coach of the year
  - Kibbie Dome: East End Addition and composite roof project completed.
  - Idaho Public Television takes over operation of KUID-TV
  - Football team advances to Division I-AA quarterfinals; first-ever postseason appearance
  - resident undergraduate fees: $408 per semester
- 1983 – Agricultural Engineering building completed – (renamed "J.W. Martin" – 1990s) – 6th St. and Perimeter Rd.
  - Total enrollment at 9,067 in spring
  - Core curriculum implemented in August (starting with class of 1987)
- 1984 – KUID-FM (91.7 MHz) funding is cut by state legislature – acquired by KWSU and renamed KRFA
  - Lionel Hampton's first appearance at the UI Jazz Festival – February
  - University Gallery (Assay Building, 1906) demolished for construction of Life Sciences North (Gibb Hall)
  - College of Law Building (1973) renamed for Albert R. Menard, Jr. (1918–93), former dean (1967–78) – (photo)
- 1985 – women's swimming dropped as a varsity sport (returns in 2004)
  - Jazz Festival renamed for Hampton
  - Physical Sciences building (1964) renamed for Malcolm Renfrew
  - resident undergraduate fees: $505 per semester, non-residents added $1,000
- 1986 – Life Sciences North building completed – (renamed for former President Gibb in 1993)
  - men's swimming dropped as a varsity sport
- 1987 – The School of Music is named after Lionel Hampton, becomes the Lionel Hampton School of Music
  - President Gibb's salary boosted by over 15%, to $77,928.
  - total enrollment at 8,280 in spring
- 1988 – Football team achieves top ranking and advances to Division I-AA semifinals;
  quarterback John Friesz wins Walter Payton Award
- 1989 – Elisabeth Zinser becomes 14th UI president; first female university president in state history
  - President's annual salary increased to $115,000.
  - new UI bookstore opens in August, on former parking lot east of Student Union Building (SUB)
  - resident undergraduate fees: $549 per semester
- 1990 – original Tartan Turf (1972) of Kibbie Dome is replaced; ground-anchored goalposts removed
  - Business Technology Incubator building completed – March – Sweet Ave. and S. Main St.
  - campus post office station moved from library (lower NW corner) to new UI Bookstore building
  - financial aid office moved to old UI bookstore, south of SUB
- 1992 – UI receives its own zip code: 83844 – November
  - resident undergraduate fees: $648 per semester, non-residents added $1,450
- 1993 – UI Library (1957) expanded by 50%, completed in fall – dedicated April 1994
  - Life Sciences North (1986) renamed for Richard D. Gibb (1928–94), former UI president (1977–89)
  - Football team reaches Division I-AA semifinals; quarterback Doug Nussmeier wins Walter Payton Award
- 1995 – student radio station KUOI-FM (89.3 MHz) boosts power from fifty to four hundred watts – January
  - College of Mines and Earth Resources' McClure Hall dedicated – September
  - resident undergraduate fees: $810 per semester
  - total enrollment at 11,727 in fall
- 1996 – UI joins Big West Conference for athletics, returns to Division I-A football after 18 years – July
  - originally admitted in 1973, when conference was the PCAA, but denied by state board of education
  - Robert Hoover becomes 15th UI president in July.
  - outdoor track stadium (1972) named for new Olympic decathlon champion Dan O'Brien – September
  - Engineering/Physics building dedicated – October 4
  - Greenhouses on Sixth Street renovated and re-dedicated – November 1
- 1998 – Vandal football team wins first Division I-A conference title and bowl game – (photo – town parade)
  - women's soccer added as a varsity sport – fall
  - Bill Chipman Palouse Trail to Pullman opens – April
- 1999 – renovation of Gauss (1942) and Johnson (1950) engineering labs completed – November
  - resident undergraduate fees: $1,068 per semester, non-residents added $3,000

== 2000s ==
- 2000 – Idaho Commons opens January 10, dedicated April 7 – east of UCC (now TLC)
  - College of Forestry, Wildlife, & Range Sciences (FWR) is renamed – becomes College of Natural Resources (CNR)
  - A doctored promotional photograph, where the faces of two minority students replaced the faces of white students, was found and removed from the website.
- 2001 – Cowan Spectrum, an enclosed configuration for basketball in Kibbie Dome, debuts in February
  - Big West drops football after 2000 – UI becomes a "football only" member in Sun Belt for four seasons (2001–04)
  - College of Agriculture is renamed – becomes College of Agricultural and Life Sciences (CALS)
  - Agriculture Biotechnology Laboratory dedicated – October 28
  - East entrance to campus completed – Sweet Ave. @ S. Main Street
- 2002 – Student Recreation Center – April – north of Theophilus Tower dorm; formerly the site of maintenance buildings.
  - Budget crisis forces reorganization of colleges – July 1
    - Letters & Science splits into College of Science and College of Letters, Arts, & Social Science (CLASS).
    - College of Mines & Earth Resources is eliminated, programs moved to either Science or Engineering
  - J.A. Albertson building completed (College of Business & Economics) – dedicated October 24
    directly west of Admin. Building, incorporated Admin. Annex (1950)
  - Park Village Apts. (1957) demolished (married & graduate housing) – 3rd & Home St.
- 2003 – Living Learning Community – first 5 of 8 dormitories completed west of Line St., east of Theophilus Tower
  - Gault-Upham dormitory (1955) is demolished, site now an open area west of Living Learning Community
  - resident undergraduate fees: $1,522 per semester
- 2004 – Vandal Athletic Center – March 19, dedicated April 30 – enhancement of Kibbie Dome's East End Addition (1982).
  - women's swimming reintroduced in fall – (orig. 1972–85) – Title IX balance for additional football scholarships in Div I-A
  - final three units of Living Learning Center completed – former Gault-Upham dormitory (1955–2003) becomes open area
  - Timothy P. White becomes 16th UI president in August, at an annual salary of $270,000.
- 2005 – UI joins the Western Athletic Conference (WAC) for all sports – July 1
  - infilled SprinTurf installed on varsity practice fields east of Kibbie Dome – August – replaced limited-use natural grass;
    – two fields, each 75 yards (69 m) in length with a goal post, lighting, & fencing; now available for intramurals and recreation.
  - Teaching & Learning Center opens, formerly the University Classroom Center (1965–2003)
- 2007 – Kibbie Dome installs infilled "Real Grass Pro" – August – similar to FieldTurf, replaced the 1990 AstroTurf
  - resident undergraduate fees: $2,100 per semester, non-residents add $4,800
- 2009 – first phase of safety improvements for Kibbie Dome (1975); west wall is replaced (wood to non-flammable translucent) and field-level exits are added.
  - Football team defeats Bowling Green in Humanitarian Bowl
    - senior left guard Mike Iupati named All-American, selected in first round (17th overall) in 2010 NFL draft
- 2010 – first chilled water tank constructed at golf course's fourth tee, SW corner of Nez Perce Drive and Perimeter Road.
  Ninety feet (27 m) in height, volume of two million US gallons (7,600 m^{3})
- 2011 – Navy ROTC building (1942) damaged by accidental fire in June; razed in August
  - second phase of safety improvements to Kibbie Dome; east wall is replaced to match west wall (2009);
    new press box built above north grandstand, former press box above south grandstand is converted to premium seating (Litehouse Center)
  - Dan O'Brien Track Stadium (1972) undergoes major renovation in preparation for hosting the WAC championships in spring 2012
  - Ernesto Bustamante, assistant professor of psychology, killed graduate student Katy Benoit, then took his own life (August).
- 2012 – During the vetting process in February, the State Board of Education removed the term "flagship" from the proposed mission statement because of a desire to not have comparative and competitive terms in mission statements. Prior to this decision, higher education scholars and administrators outside the state considered UI to be the state's flagship university; it remains to be seen if the removal of the state's official designation will alter wider opinions.
- 2013 – UI competes as FBS independent; WAC discontinued football after the 2012 season
- 2014 – UI rejoins the Big Sky Conference for all sports except football, which rejoined the Sun Belt (last in 2004) – July 1
  - resident undergraduate fees: $3,392 per semester (in fall)
- 2016 – Sun Belt announces that neither the UI nor New Mexico State would be renewed after the 2017 football season,
  UI announces return to FCS and Big Sky for football in 2018 (last in 1995)
  - UI Library (1957) completes a major renovation of the first floor
  - resident undergraduate fees: $3,616 per semester (in fall)
  - football team defeats Colorado State in Famous Idaho Potato Bowl
- 2017 – Integrated Research and Innovation Center (IRIC) opens in January; on former site of Navy ROTC building.
- 2018 – Football returns to Big Sky (and FCS)
- 2019 – Groundbreaking for Idaho Central Credit Union Arena in June, north of Kibbie Dome's west end.
  - Alumnus C. Scott Green (1984) becomes 19th UI president in July, at an annual salary of $420,000.
- 2021 – Idaho Central Credit Union Arena completed in late September.
  - outdoor practice field east of Kibbie Dome renovated with a new AstroTurf RootZone 3D3 playing surface.
  - resident undergraduate fees: $4,170 per semester (in fall)
- 2022 – Four UI students are killed in an attack with an "edged weapon" on Sunday, November 13; the case has garnered national and international media attention. WSU graduate student Bryan Kohberger was arrested at his parents' home in Pennsylvania on December 30 and charged in connection to the killings.
- 2023 – University forms a new non-profit organization, Four Three Education, for the purpose of purchasing the University of Phoenix. (Idaho became the 43rd state in 1890.) Initially, a new entity was created for the purchase by U of I named "NewU, Inc." NewU University in Washington DC, which is not affiliated with either institution, filed a claim for trademark infringement of its registered trademark "NewU Inc.", causing U of I to change of the name of its newly formed entity to Four Three Education.
- 2024 – Resident undergraduate fees: $4,542 per semester (in fall), non-residents add $9,618
- 2025 – Plan to purchase the University of Phoenix is scrapped.
