= List of University of Idaho people =

This is a list of notable alumni of the University of Idaho and a list of its presidents.

== Alumni ==
=== Academia ===
==== Administration ====
- Lawrence Henry Chamberlain - former dean of Columbia College (1950–1958) and vice president of Columbia University (1962–1967); B.S. '30
- C. Scott Green - nineteenth president of the university (2019– ); Class of '84
- James Henry Meyer - chancellor of the University of California, Davis 1969–1987; B.S. '47

=== Business ===
- William Agee - business executive; Class of '60
- Jack Lemley - construction manager for Europe's Channel Tunnel or "Chunnel," the undersea rail tube linking England and France; Class of '60
- Frank Shrontz - former chairman and CEO (1986–96) of Boeing; LL.B. '54

=== Criminals ===
- Anthony Curcio - former Vandal football player; real estate investor; masterminded one of the most elaborate armored car heists in history

=== Government ===
- Blaine Anderson - federal judge, U.S District Court (1971–76); U.S. Court of Appeals (1976–88); LL.B. '49
- Phil Batt - governor (1995–99); UI chemical engineering student, withdrew in 1948 due to family hardship
- Roger Batzel - director (1971–1988) of Lawrence Livermore National Laboratory; B.S.Ch.E. '47
- Terrel Bell - Secretary of Education (1981–85); M.A. '54
- Mary (Thomas) Brooks - director of the U.S. Mint (1969–77); Class of '29
- Hamer Budge - U.S. House (1951–61), headed SEC (1969–71); J.D. '36
- Roger Burdick - Idaho Supreme Court justice (2003–21); chief justice (2011–15, 2017–20); J.D. '74
- Pete Cenarrusa - longtime Secretary of State of Idaho; Class of '40
- Larry Craig - U.S. senator (1991–2009); U.S. House (1981–91); Class of '69
- Daniel Eismann - Idaho Supreme Court justice (2001–17); chief justice (2007–11); J.D. '76
- Mark Felt - FBI special agent and associate director; Watergate informer "Deep Throat;" Class of '35
- Abe Goff - U.S. House (1947–49); later served on ICC; LL.B. 1924
- Philip Habib - diplomat, special envoy to the Middle East under President Reagan; Class of '42
- Joel Horton - Idaho Supreme Court justice (2007–18); J.D. '85
- Dirk Kempthorne - Secretary of the Interior (2006–09); governor (1999–2006); U.S. senator (1993–99); mayor of Boise (1985–93); Class of '75
- Gus Kohntopp - colonel in the Idaho Air National Guard; identified as one of two 190th Fighter Squadron pilots involved in the 190th Fighter Squadron, Blues and Royals friendly fire incident - March 28, 2003
- R.D. Leeper - Idaho Supreme Court justice (1932); LL.B. 1913
- Edward Lodge - federal judge, U.S District Court (1989– ); LL.B. '61
- Jim McClure - U.S. senator (1973–91); U.S. House (1967–73); LL.B. '50
- Ray McNichols - federal judge, U.S District Court (1964–85); LL.B. '50
- Tom Nelson - federal judge, U.S. Court of Appeals (1990–2009); LL.B. '62
- Mike O'Callaghan - governor of Nevada (1971–79); B.S., M.Ed. '56
- Sarah Palin - governor of Alaska (2006–09); Class of '87, B.A. Communications
- Jim Risch - U.S. senator (2009– ); Lieutenant Governor (2003–06, 2007–09); governor (2006–07); Class of '65, J.D. '68
- Harold L. Ryan - federal judge, U.S District Court (1981–95); LL.B. '50
- Henry Lee Schatz - agricultural economist with the Foreign Agricultural Service; rescued from Iran in the Canadian Caper Class of '71, M.S. '74
- Steve Symms - U.S. senator (1981–93); U.S. House (1973–81); Class of '60
- Fred Taylor - U.S District Court judge (1954–88); LL.B. '26
- Linda Copple Trout - first female Idaho Supreme Court justice (1992–2007) and chief justice (1997–2004); Class of '73, J.D. '77
- Jesse Walters - Idaho Supreme Court justice (1997–2003), chief judge of the Idaho Court of Appeals (1982–97); J.D. '63
- Herman Welker - U.S. senator (1951–57); LL.B. 1929
- Compton I. White Jr. - U.S. House (1963–67); Class of '42
- Calvin E. Wright - Idaho State Auditor (1939-45), Democratic nominee for Idaho governor 1950, Internal Revenue Service Idaho director 1951–1973; Class of 1930
- Colleen Zahn - Idaho Supreme Court justice (2021– ); Class of '95, J.D. '00

=== Journalism ===
- Kelli Johnson, sports anchor for NBC Sports Bay Area, Class of 1998
- Michael Kirk, documentary filmmaker and co-creator of Frontline; Class of '71
- Otis Livingston, sportscaster for WCBS-TV in New York
- David Neiwert, Seattle-based investigative journalist and blogger (Orcinus); contributing writer for the Southern Poverty Law Center; author of Of Orcas and Men: What Killer Whales Can Teach Us (2015); Class of 1984

=== Literature and the arts ===
- Colby Acuff - country singer-songwriter; Class of 2019
- Rayce Bird - makeup and special effects artist; Season Two winner of SyFy's Face Off
- Holden Bowler - namesake of J.D. Salinger's character Holden Caulfield; soloist in the Robert Shaw Chorale; attended from 1931 to 1935, but did not graduate
- Carol Ryrie Brink - author; winner of the John Newbery Medal in 1936 for her book Caddie Woodlawn; Moscow native; attended UI 1914–17
- Canary Lee Burton - composer and classical music DJ
- Marilyn Denis - morning show co-host on CHUM-FM in Toronto, Ontario; host of TV shows CityLine and The Marilyn Denis Show
- Bill Fagerbakke - actor, television series Coach (1989–97); voice of Patrick Star on SpongeBob SquarePants; Class of '81
- Jim Lemley - Hollywood film producer; produced Wanted and 9; former CEO of Mel Gibson's Icon Productions International; Class of '88
- "Seanbaby" (Sean Reiley) - comedy writer and video game critic
- E.E. "Doc" Smith - science fiction author; wrote the Lensman series and the Skylark series; Class of 1914
- Mitch Swanger - drummer and founding member of Silent Theory
- Brad Teare - painter and illustrator
- Bobbie Thomas - style editor for NBC's Today Show
- Rebecca Zanetti - romance novelist

=== Military ===
- James F. Amos - commandant of the Marine Corps (2010–2014); Class of 1970

=== Science ===
- Steven Amstrup - polar bear researcher and conservationist; M.S. '75
- Thomas Gibson - aerospace engineer and entrepreneur; B.S. '22
- Thomas Mueller - rocket engineer and rocket engine designer; a founding employee of SpaceX
- Malcolm Renfrew - polymer chemist, inventor, and professor emeritus; contributor to the development of Teflon; Class of '32, M.S. '34
- Bob Twiggs - rocket scientist; inventor of the CubeSat technology; Class of '61

=== Sports ===
==== Olympics ====
- Kristin Armstrong, cyclist; 2008, 2012, and 2016 Olympic gold medalist (women's time trial); Class of '95
- Hec Edmundson, state's first Olympian in 1912 (7th in 800 m, 6th in 400 m); Class of 1910 (see entry under "Basketball")
- Dan O'Brien, 1996 Olympic gold medalist (decathlon), three-time world champion; Class of '93
- Joachim Olsen, 2004, Olympic bronze medalist (shot put) for Denmark and NCAA champion; Class of '02
- Chris Stokes, five-time Olympic bobsledder for Jamaica; Class of '87
- Angela Whyte, 2004 Olympic finalist (100 m hurdles); 2008 representative for Canada; four-time NCAA All-American; Class of '03

==== Baseball ====
- Bob Dillinger - MLB third baseman; three-time AL stolen base champion; Class of '40
- Frank Reberger - MLB pitcher (1968–72); Class of '66
- Ken Schrom - MLB pitcher (1980–87); former Vandal quarterback; Class of '77
- Bill Stoneman - MLB pitcher (1967–74); threw two MLB no-hitters; GM of L.A. Angels (1999–2007); Class of '66

==== Basketball ====
- Steve Belko - head coach at Idaho State and Oregon; third commissioner of Big Sky Conference; also starred in football for Vandals; Class of '39
- Hec Edmundson - basketball and track coach at UI and Washington; Class of 1910
- Gordon Herbert - played for the Vandals from 1979–82, subsequently played professional basketball mainly in Finland; coached mainly in Europe, winning the 2023 FIBA Basketball World Cup as head coach of Germany; Class of '82
- Gus Johnson - NBA star (power forward) (1963–73); played for Vandals during the 1962–63 season; Class of '64
- Dan Monson - head coach at Eastern Washington University; formerly at Gonzaga, Minnesota and Long Beach State; Class of '85
- Don Monson - head coach at UI (1978–83) and Oregon; father of Dan Monson; Class of '55
- Don Newman - head coach at Arizona State and NBA assistant coach (Spurs: 2002–12); Big Sky player of the year (1980)

==== Football ====
- Steve Buratto - CFL head coach for Calgary (1984–85) and British Columbia (2000–02); Class of '65
- Tom Cable - NFL head coach for Oakland (2008–10) and UI head coach (2000–03); Class of '86
- Spencer Folau - NFL guard (1997–2004); Class of '97
- John Friesz - NFL quarterback (1990–2000), 2006 College Football Hall of Fame inductee, 1989 Walter Payton Award winner; Class of '90
- Ken Hobart - USFL and CFL quarterback; Class of '84
- Mike Hollis - NFL placekicker (1995–2002); Class of '94
- Bret Ingalls - offensive line coach for the New Orleans Saints; 27 years in college football; won 2009 Super Bowl XLIV in his first season with the Saints
- Mike Iupati - NFL guard; San Francisco 49ers' first-round draft pick, 17th overall (2010–2020); Class of 2010
- Tony Knap - head coach at Utah State (1963–66), Boise State (1968–75), and UNLV (1976–81); Class of '39
- Jerry Kramer - NFL Hall of Fame guard, Green Bay Packers (1958–68); author; five NFL titles and two Super Bowl wins; Class of '58
- Jordan Kramer - NFL linebacker (2003–2004) for the Tennessee Titans, Class of '03
- Scott Linehan - NFL head coach for the St. Louis Rams (2006–08); former Vandal quarterback; Class of '87
- Don Matthews - CFL head coach (1983–2008); five Grey Cup titles, over 200 CFL wins; Class of '64
- Ray McDonald - NFL running back (1967–69); Washington Redskins' first-round draft pick, 13th overall; led nation in rushing in 1966; Class of '67
- Sam Merriman - NFL linebacker (1983–87) for the Seattle Seahawks; Class of '83
- Yo Murphy - former NFL and CFL wide receiver; Class of '92
- Jim Norton - AFL all-star safety and punter, Houston Oilers (1960–68); Class of '60
- Doug Nussmeier - NFL quarterback (1994–97), 1993 Walter Payton Award winner; Michigan offensive coordinator; Class of '94
- Ryan Phillips - NFL linebacker (1997–2001); Class of '97
- Jim Prestel - NFL defensive tackle (1960–67); Class of '60
- Bud Riley - CFL head coach for Winnipeg (1974–77) and Hamilton (1982–83); Class of '52
- Jeff Robinson - NFL tight end and long snapper (1993–2005, 2007), Super Bowl win with the Rams; Class of '93
- Mark Schlereth - NFL guard (1989–2000) with the Redskins and Broncos; three Super Bowl wins; ESPN commentator; Class of '89
- Jake Scott - NFL guard (2004–12); Super Bowl title with the Colts; Class of '03
- Lyle Smith - head coach at Boise State (1947–67) and its athletic director (1968–81); Class of '39
- Joel Thomas - running backs coach for the New Orleans Saints
- Korey Toomer - linebacker at Seattle Seahawks; Class of '12
- Chris Tormey - head coach at UI (1995–99) and Nevada (2000–03); assistant at Washington and Washington State; Class of '78
- Mao Tosi - former NFL defensive end for the Arizona Cardinals (2000–2001); Class of '00
- David Vobora - linebacker for the St. Louis Rams and Seattle Seahawks; 2008 Mr. Irrelevant; Class of '08
- Wayne Walker - NFL all-star linebacker, Detroit Lions (1958–72); sportscaster; Class of '58
- Marvin Washington - NFL defensive end (1989–99); Class of '88
- John Yarno - NFL center, Seattle Seahawks (1977–82); UI's first Div-I AP first team All-American (1976); Class of '77

== Faculty ==
Current

- Douglas Q. Adams - emeritus professor of English
- Kim Barnes - professor of English
- Daniel Bukvich - professor of Music
- Ruprecht Machleidt - professor of Physics
- Daniel Orozco - associate professor of English
- J. Michael Scott - emeritus professor of Fish & Wildlife
- Jean'ne Shreeve - professor of Chemistry
- Jack Ernest Vincent - emeritus professor of Political Science
- Robert Wrigley - professor of English

Former

- John Merton Aldrich - zoology
- Darrell Bolz - agricultural extension
- David Comer - electrical engineering
- James Gill - painting
- Gustaf Wilhelm Hammar - political science
- Ralph C. Hancock - political science
- Lawrence H. Johnston - physics
- Robert Peters - creative writing
- Malcolm Renfrew - chemistry
- Vern Rutsala - creative writing
- Roderick Sprague - anthropology and archaeology
- David B. Steinman - engineering
- Yvor Winters - creative writing
- Gordon Woods - veterinary science

== Presidents of the University of Idaho ==
The following individuals have held the office of president of the University of Idaho:

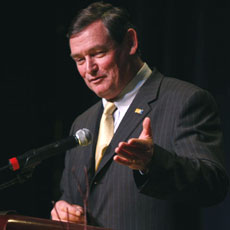
No.	Image	President	Term start	Term end	Refs.
acting		James H. Forney	1891	1892
1		Franklin B. Gault	1892	1898
2		Joseph P. Blanton	1898	1900
3		James Alexander MacLean	1900	February 1, 1913 (Note: Resigned to head the University of Manitoba)
acting		William L. Carlyle	February 3, 1913	1914
4		Melvin A. Brannon	1914	1917
5		Ernest H. Lindley	1917	1920
6		Alfred H. Upham	1920	1928
7		Frederick J. Kelly	1928	1930
8		Mervin G. Neale	1930	1937
9		Harrison C. Dale	1937	1946
10		Jesse E. Buchanan	1946	1954
11		Donald R. Theophilus	1954	1965
12		Ernest W. Hartung	1965	1977
13		Richard D. Gibb	1977	1989
14		Elisabeth A. Zinser	1989	1995 (Note: Resigned to head the University of Kentucky)
acting		Thomas O. Bell	1995	1996
15		Robert A. Hoover	1996	June 30, 2003
interim		Gary G. Michael (Note: Former CEO of Albertsons)	July 1, 2003	June 30, 2004
16		Timothy P. White	July 1, 2004	June 30, 2008 (Note: Resigned to head the University of California at Riverside)
interim		Steven Daley-Laursen	July 1, 2008	June 30, 2009
17		M. Duane Nellis	July 1, 2009	May 31, 2013 (Note: Resigned to head Texas Tech)
interim		Donald L. Burnett Jr.	June 1, 2013	February 28, 2014
18		Chuck Staben	March 1, 2014	June 15, 2019
19		C. Scott Green	July 1, 2019	present

Table notes:
