= 1988 Eastern Washington Eagles football team =

American college football season

1988 Eastern Washington Eagles football
- Conference: Big Sky Conference
- Record: 2–8–1 (2–6 Big Sky)
- Head coach: Dick Zornes (10th season)
- Home stadium: Joe Albi Stadium

1988 Big Sky Conference football standings
	Conf.					Overall
Team	W		L		T	W		L		T
No. 1 Idaho $^	7	–	1	–	0	11	–	2	–	0
No. 16 Montana ^	6	–	2	–	0	8	–	4	–	0
No. 12 Boise State ^	5	–	3	–	0	8	–	4	–	0
Nevada	4	–	4	–	0	7	–	4	–	0
Northern Arizona	4	–	4	–	0	6	–	5	–	0
Weber State	4	–	4	–	0	5	–	6	–	0
Montana State	4	–	4	–	0	4	–	7	–	0
Eastern Washington	2	–	6	–	0	2	–	8	–	1
Idaho State	0	–	8	–	0	0	–	11	–	0
$ – Conference champion; ^ – NCAA Division I-AA playoff participant; Rankings from NCAA Division I-AA Poll

The 1988 Eastern Washington Eagles football team was an American football team that represented Eastern Washington University as a member of the Big Sky Conference during the 1988 NCAA Division I-AA football season. Led by tenth-year head coach Dick Zornes, the Eagles compiled an overall record of 2–8–1, with a mark of 2–6 in conference play, and finished eighth in the Big Sky.

== Schedule ==
Date	Opponent	Site	Result	Attendance	Source
September 3	Portland State*	Joe Albi Stadium; Spokane, WA	T 31–31		
September 10	at Northern Arizona	Walkup Skydome; Flagstaff, AZ	L 24–34	10,982	
September 17	Montana State	Joe Albi Stadium; Spokane, WA	L 13–35		
September 24	No. 11 Boise State	Joe Albi Stadium; Spokane, WA	W 34–28	4,513	
October 1	at No. 1 North Texas*	Fouts Field; Denton, TX	L 0–51	15,925	
October 8	at No. 13 Montana	Washington–Grizzly Stadium; Missoula, MT (rivalry)	L 6–30	9,145	
October 15	No. 7 Idaho	Joe Albi Stadium; Spokane, WA	L 22–31	6,644	
October 22	at No. 11 Stephen F. Austin*	Homer Bryce Stadium; Nacogdoches, TX	L 10–48		
October 29	at Idaho State	Holt Arena; Pocatello, ID	W 35–3		
November 5	Weber State	Joe Albi Stadium; Spokane, WA	L 30–51	2,010	
November 12	at Nevada	Mackay Stadium; Reno, NV	L 12–30	12,100	
*Non-conference game; Rankings from NCAA Division I-AA Football Committee Poll released prior to the game
