= Duane Nellis =

American university administrator

M. Duane Nellis

21st President of Ohio University
- In office June 12, 2017 – June 14, 2021
- Preceded by: David Descutner (interim); Roderick J. McDavis
- Succeeded by: Hugh Sherman

16th President of Texas Tech University
- In office 2013–2016
- Preceded by: Guy Bailey
- Succeeded by: John Opperman (interim)

17th President of the University of Idaho
- In office 2009–2013
- Preceded by: Timothy White
- Succeeded by: Chuck Staben

Personal details
- Born: July 26, 1954 (age 72) Spokane, Washington, U.S.
- Spouse: Ruthie Nellis
- Children: 2
- Education: Montana State University (BS); Oregon State University (MS, PhD)
- Profession: Academic Administrator and Geographer
- Website: www.ohio.edu/president/

Academic background
- Thesis: Water management in the North Deschutes Unit Irrigation District: Geographic perspectives and remote sensing applications (1980)
- Doctoral advisor: Richard M. Highsmith

Academic work
- Discipline: Geography
- Sub-discipline: GIS
- Institutions: Kansas State University; West Virginia University; University of Idaho; Texas Tech University; Ohio University

Marvin Duane Nellis (born July 26, 1954) is an American educator and university administrator who served as the 21st president of Ohio University in Athens. He was previously the president of Texas Tech University and the University of Idaho. Nellis previously served as provost and senior vice president at Kansas State University, and dean of the Eberly College of Arts and Science at West Virginia University.

== Early life and education ==
Born in Spokane, Washington, Nellis was raised in northwestern Montana and graduated from Libby High School in 1972. He attended Montana State University in Bozeman and earned a bachelor's degree in earth sciences and geography in 1976. Nellis went on to graduate from Oregon State University with a master's in geography in 1977 and a Ph.D in geography in 1980. His doctoral dissertation was on remote sensing in water resource management.

== Academic career ==
After graduate school, Nellis has worked for over 30 years in various administrative roles at Kansas State University, West Virginia University, University of Idaho, Texas Tech University, and most recently at Ohio University. At Kansas State, Nellis was a department head, associate dean, and after returning from West Virginia (where he served as dean of the Eberly College of Arts and Sciences), served as provost and senior vice president from 2004 until his departure for the university presidency at Idaho in 2009. He later became president of Texas Tech in June 2013, serving until 2017.

Nellis' research has focused on geographic information systems and remote sensing, and he is internationally recognized for his work in this area, including receiving numerous university, national and international teaching, research and advising awards, and serving as president (2002–2003) of the Association of American Geographers, president of the National Council for Geographic Education (1993–1994), and president of Gamma Theta Upsilon, the international honor geographical society (1999–2000).

=== University of Idaho ===
Nellis arrived at the University of Idaho in Moscow in 2009 and led a major $225 million capital campaign, and oversaw over $80 million in campus facility improvements. He created the President's Diversity Council, enhanced what became a nationally award-winning engagement effort through creation of the Office for Community Partnerships, improved major inter-disciplinary initiatives, and significantly improved business partnerships between the university and business and commodity groups in Idaho and throughout the Northwest.

As UI president, Nellis was a member of the BCS Presidential Oversight Committee. As a nationally recognized higher education leader, he has served as a commissioner for the Northwest Commission of Colleges and Universities (one of 8 nationally recognized accreditation bodies). He also served as a Governor-appointed commissioner of the Western Interstate Commission for Higher Education, which coordinates higher education efforts for the 15 western states, and has been involved in various national committees for the Association of Public and Land-grant Universities (APLU).

=== Texas Tech University ===
Nellis was announced as the final candidate for the presidency of Texas Tech University on March 1, 2013. According to news reports, he was recruited for the position, and had not applied. On March 22, the Texas Tech Board of Regents unanimously confirmed him as the university's next president, effective June 15.

During his tenure, Nellis promoted moving Texas Tech University forward toward higher levels of national prominence as a major public research university. He has advocated for continued quality enrollment growth (including stronger advocacy for national and international student recognition), accelerated research expenditures and faculty recognitions, creating a more engaged institution while promoting industry and community partnerships, with a commitment toward global connections and creativity while seeking external revenue sources to invest in the university enterprise. Under Nellis' leadership, Texas Tech was named in 2014 an APLU Innovation and Economic Prosperity University. Texas Tech also achieved Tier One Carnegie Designation for the highest research category after his presidential term.

Nellis also served as a tenured university honors professor while working on broader university strategic initiatives. From 2013 to 2017, Nellis was a trustee of the Southern Association of Colleges and Schools Commission on Colleges.

=== Ohio University ===
In 2017, Nellis was announced as the next president of Ohio University on February 22, and he officially took office on June 12.

In 2018, Nellis is credited with championing the new OHIO Honors Program instituted under the established Honors Tutorial College at Ohio University in 2016. Evidence suggests that this reinforcing of academic excellence improved Ohio University's ranking and incoming student GPA scores since 2018.

He served as a member of the Association of Public and Land-grant Universities Commission on Economic and Community Engagement Executive Committee in 2019.

On May 4, 2020, the Ohio University Faculty Senate approved a vote of no confidence (44 to 11) in Nellis and Vice President for Finance Deborah Shaffer following an announcement from the president's office that 140 positions at the university would be cut as part of a budget reduction plan. The faculty senate accused Nellis of "leading the university to a budget crisis, made much worse by the coronavirus pandemic." Ohio University had been facing "significant" budget shortfalls due to declining enrollment and in March 2020, Nellis announced that the university's academic colleges would have to make $26 million in budget cuts through 2023 and that administrative cuts amounting to $8 million would have to be made with no timeline on the latter. Although the faculty senate vote was nonbinding, a petition was created that had nearly 200 signatures by March 4 and by March 6 the petition neared 600 signatures. The OU Trustees maintained their support of both Nellis and Shaffer per a statement issued on May 11.

Nellis stepped down as the President of Ohio University in 2021, and as of May 2022, serves as a President Emeritus and Trustee Professor in the Geography Department of the College of Arts & Sciences.

Nellis was named 2023 Fellow of the American Association of Geographers, a lifetime achievement award recognizing his expertise in the field of geography, particularly remote sensing, and his leadership roles in higher education.

== Personal life ==
Nellis met his wife Ruthie as an undergraduate at Montana State. She was from Pennsylvania and became a librarian. As a librarian, she oversaw a science library at Kansas State and the medical school library at West Virginia. She also worked in Kansas State's commercialization initiative and was project manager on several major library building projects at West Virginia. Married in 1975, the couple has two sons, Jonathan and Jason.

== See also ==
- List of presidents of Ohio University
