= 1988 Boise State Broncos football team =

American college football season

1988 Boise State Broncos football

NCAA Division I-AA First Round, L 13–22 vs. Northwestern State
- Conference: Big Sky Conference
- Record: 8–4 (5–3 Big Sky)
- Head coach: Skip Hall (2nd season)
- Home stadium: Bronco Stadium

1988 Big Sky Conference football standings
	Conf.					Overall
Team	W		L		T	W		L		T
No. 1 Idaho $^	7	–	1	–	0	11	–	2	–	0
No. 16 Montana ^	6	–	2	–	0	8	–	4	–	0
No. 12 Boise State ^	5	–	3	–	0	8	–	4	–	0
Nevada	4	–	4	–	0	7	–	4	–	0
Northern Arizona	4	–	4	–	0	6	–	5	–	0
Weber State	4	–	4	–	0	5	–	6	–	0
Montana State	4	–	4	–	0	4	–	7	–	0
Eastern Washington	2	–	6	–	0	2	–	8	–	1
Idaho State	0	–	8	–	0	0	–	11	–	0
$ – Conference champion; ^ – NCAA Division I-AA playoff participant; Rankings from NCAA Division I-AA Poll

The 1988 Boise State Broncos football team represented Boise State University in the 1988 NCAA Division I-AA football season. The Broncos competed in the Big Sky Conference and played their home games on campus at Bronco Stadium in Boise, Idaho. Led by second-year head coach Skip Hall, they finished the regular season at 8–3 (5–3 in Big Sky, third).

In the rivalry game with second-ranked Idaho at Bronco Stadium on November 19, a conference attendance record of 23,687 was set, but the Vandals won for the seventh consecutive year.

The Broncos made the Division I-AA playoffs, the first time since 1981, but lost at home in the first round to Northwestern State to finish at 8–4. The Big Sky had three teams in the 16–team playoffs for the first time; Montana lost at Idaho in the first round and the Vandals were stopped in the semifinals.

== Schedule ==
Date	Time	Opponent	Rank	Site	Result	Attendance	Source
September 3		at Long Beach State*		Veterans Memorial Stadium; Long Beach, CA	W 29–10	6,032	
September 10		Sam Houston State*		Bronco Stadium; Boise, ID	W 14–10	20,383	
September 17		at Northern Arizona		Walkup Skydome; Flagstaff, AZ	W 24–21 ^{2OT}	20,383	
September 24	8:00 pm	at Eastern Washington	No. 11	Joe Albi Stadium; Spokane, WA	L 28–34	4,513	
October 1	7:00 pm	Weber State	No. 19	Bronco Stadium; Boise, ID	W 31–27	20,890	
October 15		at Montana State	No. 13	Reno H. Sales Stadium; Bozeman, MT	L 7–51	9,807	
October 22	7:00 pm	No. 12 Montana		Bronco Stadium; Boise, ID	W 31–28	19,059	
October 29	7:00 pm	No. 17 Nevada^{†}		Bronco Stadium; Boise, ID (rivalry)	W 40–28	22,178	
November 5	7:30 pm	at Idaho State	No. 17	Holt Arena; Pocatello, ID	W 31–10	7,125	
November 12	1:30 pm	Eastern Illinois*	No. 15	Bronco Stadium; Boise, ID	W 12–7	12,871	
November 19	2:30 pm	No. 2 Idaho	No. 13	Bronco Stadium; Boise, ID (rivalry)	L 20–26	23,687	
November 26		No. 8 Northwestern State	No. 12	Bronco Stadium; Boise, ID (NCAA Division I-AA First Round)	L 13–22	10,537	
*Non-conference game; ^{†}Homecoming; Rankings from NCAA Division I-AA Football Committee Poll released prior to the game; All times are in Mountain time

== Roster ==
1988 Boise State Broncos football team roster
Players
Coaches
Offense

Pos.	#	Name	Class
QB		Duane Halliday	So
RB		Todd Kinzel	So
RB		Chris Thomas	Fr
RB		Robby Washington
WR		Winky White	So
WR		Jon Youngblood
WR		Terry Heffner	So
OT		David Koch	Fr
G		Dave Giacomazzo	So
C		Pat McDade	Jr
G	51	Eric Croll	Sr
OT		Robert Miller	So
TE	93	Jeff Lindsley	Sr

Defense

Pos.	#	Name	Class
DE	47	Shawn Ellis	Sr
DT		Shawn Anderson	Fr
NT		Anthony Hernandez	So
DE		Erik Helgeson	So
LB		Tim O'Connor	So
LB		Scott Russell	So
LB		Tim Langhans	So
CB		Keith Moroka	So
CB	17	Chris Truitt	So
FS		Rod Johnson	So
SS		Kenny Kuehl	So

Special teams

Pos.	#	Name	Class
K		Mike Black	Fr
P	20	Tom Schimmer	Sr

Head coach

- Skip Hall (2nd year)

Coordinators/assistant coaches

Legend

- (C) Team captain
- (S) Suspended
- (I) Ineligible
- Injured
- Redshirt
