= Charles B. Reed =

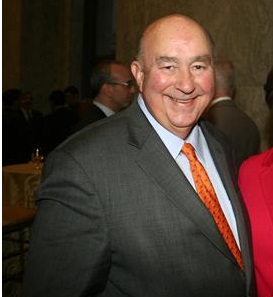

Chancellor of the California State University System
- In office 1998–2012
- Preceded by: Barry Munitz
- Succeeded by: Timothy P. White

Chancellor of the State University System of Florida
- In office 1985–1998
- Preceded by: Barbara W. Newell
- Succeeded by: Adam W. Herbert

Chief of Staff to the Governor of Florida
- In office 1984–1985

Personal details
- Born: Charles Bass Reed; September 29, 1941 Harrisburg, Pennsylvania, U.S.
- Died: December 6, 2016 (aged 75) Long Beach, Florida, U.S.
- Spouse: Catherine Sayers Reed
- Education: George Washington University
- Profession: Academic Administrator
- Website: Chancellor Charles B. Reed

Charles Bass Reed (September 29, 1941 – December 6, 2016) served as chancellor of the State University System of Florida from 1985 to 1998 and chancellor of the California State University (CSU) system from 1998 to 2012.

== Early life ==
Born in Harrisburg, Pennsylvania, Reed grew up in Waynesburg, Pennsylvania and was the eldest of seven children. His father, a graduate of the University of Notre Dame, was a civil engineer and construction supervisor. Reed played football in high school. Eventually, he earned a full athletic scholarship to George Washington University and received three degrees there: a B.S. in physical education (1963), M.A. in secondary education (1964), and Ed.D. in teacher education (1970).

== Early career ==
From 1984 to 1985, Reed was chief of staff for Florida Governor Bob Graham. From 1985 to 1998, Reed served as the chancellor of the State University System of Florida.

== California State University chancellor ==
=== Tenure (1998–2012) ===
As the former chancellor of the California State University system, Reed oversaw 44,000 faculty and staff and 427,000 students on 23 campuses and seven off-campus centers. The CSU, which spans the entire state of California, had an annual budget of more than $5 billion at its peak, but recent budget cuts have significantly reduced this figure. An appointed Board of Trustees adopts rules, regulations, and policies governing the CSU.

In March 2012, Reed was awarded the prestigious TIAA-CREF Hesburgh Award for Leadership Excellence, which is named in honor of the Rev. Theodore M. Hesburgh, C.S.C., president emeritus of the University of Notre Dame. In deciding the award, the judges cited Reed's commitment to students as chancellor of the CSU, where he has successfully steered the system's 23 campuses through state budget cuts while simultaneously meeting the complex demands of increasing enrollment. In addition, they highlighted Reed's efforts to build collaborative partnerships and award-winning outreach programs – particularly those dedicated to students from underserved backgrounds – that have received national acclaim. They also acknowledged his support of a number of multi-campus initiatives to improve research and instruction, and benefit local businesses and communities. Reed pledged the $20,000 prize from the Hesburgh Award to the William Randolph Hearst CSU Trustee's Scholarship fund. He and his wife Cathy have donated almost $90,000 to the scholarship fund since 1998.

In 2008, Reed was awarded the Harold W. McGraw, Jr. Prize in Education for his work in paving the way for increased higher education access and success for U.S. students. Judges specifically noted his efforts to reach out to students from under-represented African American, Hispanic, Native American and Asian populations. One indicator of success was an increase of 6.5 percent in the enrollment of African American students at the CSU from 2006 to 2007; an increase in Hispanic enrollment of 9.5 percent; and an increase of Native American enrollment of 8.2 percent.

Reed is credited for his strong outreach to K-12 and incoming college students. During his tenure, he led the creation of the Early Assessment Program, a partnership with the California Department of Education and California's State Board of Education to provide an early warning system on students' readiness for college. This statewide assessment is designed to test students’proficiency in mathematics and English and to reduce the likelihood that students will have to take remedial classes once they enter college. The program embeds a voluntary college-placement exam in the state testing program required of all 11th-grade students, using the CSU's admissions placement standards in math and English. The “early” component of the program—testing in the 11th grade, rather than the 12th—-provides students an opportunity to make gains in areas of weakness during their senior year. It was cited by the Commission on the Future of Higher Education as "one of the best national models of how higher-education and K–12 officials can collaborate to help students."

Reed has also led the CSU in outreach to students from traditionally under-served populations. During his tenure, the CSU created the Super Sunday outreach program, which aims to provide college information to students and their families at predominantly African-American churches throughout California. In February 2012, more than 100 Super Sunday events were held throughout the state, reaching more than 100,000 churchgoers. The annual Super Sunday effort appears to have made an impact; notably, during the open application months of October and November 2011, the CSU received 16,588 applications from individuals self-identifying as African American, representing an increase of nearly 1,000 from the prior year.

In 2005, Reed helped the CSU secure one of the most significant changes since the formation of the university system in 1960: the statutory authority to grant the independent doctor of education (Ed.D.) degree in educational leadership. Thirteen CSU campuses currently offer the Ed.D., with three more programs in the planning process or in joint programs. These doctoral programs are directly responsive to regional needs and are characterized by strong partnerships with P-12 and community college practitioners. Currently 702 educational leaders are enrolled in these programs.

During his administration, the CSU developed an integrated technology system for all the campuses and the Chancellor's Office, which became known as the Common Management System or CMS. Prior to the CMS project, the campuses had individual "legacy" systems in the areas of financials and student administration, but no system in human resources. The systems differed by campus, were antiquated, and often were not integrated; additionally many were obsolete and no longer serviced by vendors. They did not provide the level of service needed to run a system of the size and scope of the CSU. It was concluded that it was more cost-effective and beneficial to acquire and implement a new system common to all the campuses than to have a patchwork of outdated individual systems. A review by the California Bureau of State Audit determined the Chancellor's Office did not do a cost-benefit analysis or feasibility study before proceeding. Nevertheless, the CSU used the audit's recommendations to improve the implementation of the system.

=== Criticisms ===
Reed has been criticized during his tenure. The San Francisco Chronicle in 2009 questioned his hiring of outside consultants to track legislation. Current and past university officials stated that the practice was necessary due to the size and complexity of policy and budget matters facing the system. Others have raised pointed questions about the deteriorating conditions of the CSU's faculty under his leadership. The CSU system's total number of tenure track faculty was at its lowest level in over a decade by the final year of Reed's term in office, and made up just 42% of the system's total faculty.

=== Other roles ===
Reed serves on the boards or in other leadership capacities for many organizations including Urban Serving Universities, the National Board for Professional Teaching Standards, the Higher Education Center for Alcohol and Other Drug Prevention, the National Center for Educational Accountability, The College Board, and EdVoice. He has served internationally and nationally as a consultant, conference leader, and keynote speaker on education and related subjects.

=== Retirement and death ===
On May 24, 2012, after 14 years as CSU chancellor, Reed announced his retirement, leaving office at the end of December 2012, being succeeded by Timothy P. White.

On December 6, 2016, Reed died at his home in Tallahassee, Florida at age 75.
