= Chuck Staben =

American academic administrator

18th President of the University of Idaho
- In office March 1, 2014 – January 2020
- Preceded by: Duane Nellis
- Succeeded by: C. Scott Green

Personal details
- Born: May 3, 1958 (age 68) Waukegan, Illinois, U.S.
- Spouse: Mary Beth Staben
- Children: 3
- Education: University of Illinois at Urbana–Champaign (BS); University of California, Berkeley (PhD)

Academic background
- Thesis: Characterization of the yeast ADE3 gene product, C(,1)-tetrahydrofolate synthase (folate, ADE15) (1984)
- Doctoral advisor: Jesse Rabinowitz

Academic work
- Discipline: Biochemistry
- Institutions: University of Kentucky; University of South Dakota; University of Idaho

Charles Alan Staben (born May 3, 1958) is an American academic professor who served as the 18th president of the University of Idaho from 2014 to 2020. Selected by the State Board of Education on November 18, 2013, Staben succeeded interim president Donald Burnett on March 1, 2014. He was previously provost at the University of South Dakota and the acting vice president for research at the University of Kentucky.

== Early life and education ==
Born and raised in Waukegan, Illinois, Staben has two sisters; their father was an engineer and manager at United States Steel, primarily at the wire products plant in Waukegan. Staben attended Waukegan Township High School and graduated in three years. He was a member of the swim and tennis teams, was Outstanding Math Student of the Year, and graduated as valedictorian.

Staben attended the University of Illinois at Urbana-Champaign and majored in biochemistry. A member of Phi Beta Kappa, he graduated with honors, magna cum laude, in 1978. He earned his doctoral degree in biochemistry from the University of California, Berkeley in 1984, serving as a graduate research and teaching assistant. Staben completed an industrial postdoctoral research fellowship at Chiron Research Laboratories from 1985 to 1986 and a postdoctoral research fellowship at Stanford University from 1987 to 1989.

=== Early career ===
Moving east to the University of Kentucky in Lexington in 1989, Staben was a professor of biology from 1989 to 2008, serving as the chair of the biology department (2000–2004). He taught microbiology, genetics, bioinformatics, and introductory biology, winning awards including the College of Arts and Science's "Distinguished Teacher Award" from 1997 to 2000, that college's most prestigious teaching award.

From 2005 to 2008, he was the associate vice president for research at the University of Kentucky, acting as vice president from 2006 to 2007. From 2008 to 2014 Staben served as provost and vice president for academic affairs of the University of South Dakota in Vermillion.

=== University of Idaho ===
As 18th President of the University of Idaho, Staben sought to grow its enrollment and increase overall college attendance in Idaho. Working with the State Board of Education, in 2015 he advanced a "direct admissions" initiative that offered automatic admission to the state's public universities and colleges for qualified public high school seniors. Staben implemented additional changes to increase access to education, including free admission processing for all Idaho residents and a "durable admissions" program that allows student to defer admissions for up to four years after initial admission, accommodating students who have post-high school experiences such as religious missions, military service or "gap" years.

Staben maintained office hours where any student, faculty member, staff member, community member, or group was invited to meet with him. He and his wife, Mary Beth, participated in the Friendship Families program, hosting international students at their home throughout the year. Staben also challenged students to play him in racquetball, offering to buy lunch for the student who could beat him. In November 2015, he lost his first and only student match.

Staben emphasized innovation in the university's research mission, updating intellectual property guidelines in 2014. The revised approach allows industries to retain ownership of intellectual property while the university retains the right to publish and disseminate research results. The university noted that "the change already has generated projects – first among them, electrical engineering professor Brian K. Johnson's research into power systems modeling for Schweitzer Engineering Laboratory (SEL)." Other agreements under the revised guidelines included Idaho Power and Micron. Staben also advanced a new Idaho Center for Agriculture, Food and the Environment (CAFE) for research that supports the dairy industry in Idaho. Idaho's legislature appropriated $10 million for CAFE in 2017. University research expenditures grew 15 percent during Staben's tenure, reaching a high of $109.5 million in FY2017.

During Staben's administration, the University of Idaho expanded its law program location in Boise to offer all three years of a Juris Doctor education in that city (in addition to the College of Law location in Moscow). In fall 2016 the university moved its Boise-based law school offerings to the newly renovated Idaho Law and Justice Learning Center at the former Ada County Courthouse.

Working with the State Board of Education, Staben sought to expand the University of Idaho's participation in the WWAMI Regional Medical Education Program. The university received funding for 10 additional slots in the program in 2014 and 2015, with funding for five new positions for a total of 40 added by the Idaho legislature in spring 2016. WWAMI implemented a new 1.5 year basic sciences curriculum and now houses all 80 students in renovated and new facilities. In a state without its own public medical school, Staben called for bolstering all elements of the medical education pipeline – pre-medical education (including a new biomedical science undergraduate major), undergraduate medical education and residency opportunities.

President Staben helped the university complete its successful “Inspiring Futures” fundraising campaign at $261M in 2015.

The University of Idaho rejoined the Big Sky Conference in football in fall 2018.

During Staben's tenure, the University of Idaho saw new program growth in areas such as computer science and online learning.

On May 25, 2018, the Idaho State Board of Education announced that President Staben's contract would not be renewed beyond the 2018–2019 school year. Staben "will remain in the president role through June 2019."

A 2020 story in the sports business website Sportico speculated that Staben's removal as president was partly due to his resistance to a board directive that the university reduce its annual athletics expenses by $1 million, which would bring expenses below a board-imposed cap on the amount of general education revenue that went to athletics. This cut was seen as likely to result in a net reduction of two varsity sports. Staben took a more holistic view of athletic department accounting than the board, arguing that when the tuition paid by non-scholarship athletes and those on partial scholarships was taken into account, the affected sports actually turned a net profit for the university. He prepared a 22-slide presentation asserting that dropping those sports would lead to a net loss in university revenue, and that adding more sports could actually increase overall revenue. The board would not allow him to present his case. In the Sportico story, Staben noted that by 2020, the athletic department was $1.5 million over the board's cap, up from the $1 million in 2018.

After Staben stepped down as university president, he returned to classroom instruction as a professor of biology. Staben was succeeded as president by C. Scott Green, an alumnus of the University of Idaho and businessman.

== Personal life ==
Staben enjoys racquetball, bicycling, hiking and skiing, among other pursuits. He is married to Dr. Mary Beth Staben, a practicing physician in Idaho. The couple have one daughter and two sons and reside in Moscow, Idaho.
