= Sitka Jazz Festival =

Jazz Festival in Sitka, Alaska, USA

Coordinates: 57.060171°N 135.339984°W

The Sitka Jazz Festival is a three-day jazz festival in the community of Sitka, Alaska that takes place every August. It features educational clinics for participating students, evening concerts featuring professional jazz artists, and the All-Alaska Jazz Band—an audition-entrance honor ensemble for Alaskan high school students.

== History ==
The Sitka Jazz Festival was born out of Sitka High School's "Jazz Nights." The Jazz Nights have been held since 1995, featuring SHS ensembles and a guest professional artist who performs both solo and with SHS ensembles. Jazz Nights brought distinguished artists such as trumpeter Claudio Roditi and saxophonist Andres Boiarsky. The festival eventually expanded to accommodate multiple guest artists, clinics, out-of-town school jazz ensembles, and the venue was moved to the 1,500-seat Mt. Edgecumbe High School Fieldhouse. The 2005 festival was held in Sheldon Jackson College's Hames Center and in 2006 and 2007, it returned to the Sitka High School gymnasium which, through an extensive overhaul, was turned into a temporary 500-seat auditorium. The 2009 festival took place in Sitka's auditorium, designed for a 619-seat capacity. The Sitka Jazz Festival is modeled after the Lionel Hampton Jazz Festival in Moscow, Idaho.

== All-Alaska Jazz Band ==
The All-Alaska Jazz Band is independent from Alaska School Activities Association, but is the only honor jazz band in the state. It has featured students from as far north as Fairbanks and as far south as Ketchikan. Past guest directors include John Clayton, Bill Watrous, and Terell Stafford.

== Notable festival musicians ==
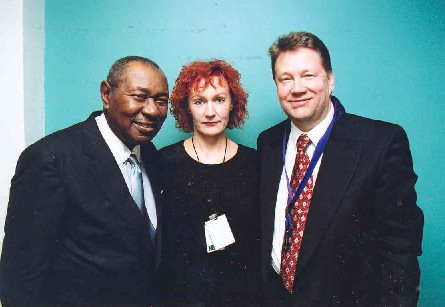
Freddy Cole (left) and Lembit Saarsalu (right).

- John Clayton
- Freddy Cole quartet
- Paquito D'Rivera
- Roberta Gamberini
- Ingrid Jensen
- Kristin Korb
- Mansound
- Claudio Roditi
- Lembit Saarsalu
- John Santos
- Terell Stafford
- Steve Turre
- Leonid Vintskevich
- Bill Watrous
- Alon Yavnai
- Tom Scott
- Barbara Morrison
- Carmen Bradford
- Eric Marienthal
- Alan Ferber
- Kenny Washington
- Sullivan Fortner
- Darren English
- Ira Nepus
- Jeff Hamilton
- Mads Tolling

== See also ==
- List of jazz festivals
