= 1988 Northern Arizona Lumberjacks football team =

American college football season

1988 Northern Arizona Lumberjacks football
- Conference: Big Sky Conference
- Record: 6–5 (4–4 Big Sky)
- Head coach: Larry Kentera (4th season)
- Home stadium: Walkup Skydome

1988 Big Sky Conference football standings
	Conf.					Overall
Team	W		L		T	W		L		T
No. 1 Idaho $^	7	–	1	–	0	11	–	2	–	0
No. 16 Montana ^	6	–	2	–	0	8	–	4	–	0
No. 12 Boise State ^	5	–	3	–	0	8	–	4	–	0
Nevada	4	–	4	–	0	7	–	4	–	0
Northern Arizona	4	–	4	–	0	6	–	5	–	0
Weber State	4	–	4	–	0	5	–	6	–	0
Montana State	4	–	4	–	0	4	–	7	–	0
Eastern Washington	2	–	6	–	0	2	–	8	–	1
Idaho State	0	–	8	–	0	0	–	11	–	0
$ – Conference champion; ^ – NCAA Division I-AA playoff participant; Rankings from NCAA Division I-AA Poll

The 1988 Northern Arizona Lumberjacks football team represented Northern Arizona University as a member of the Big Sky Conference during the 1988 NCAA Division I-AA football season. Led by fourth-year head coach Larry Kentera, the Lumberjacks compiled an overall record of 6–5, with a mark of 4–4 in conference play, and finished tied for fourth in the Big Sky.

== Schedule ==
Date	Opponent	Site	Result	Attendance	Source
September 3	Southern Utah*	Walkup Skydome; Flagstaff, AZ	W 55–13		
September 10	Eastern Washington	Walkup Skydome; Flagstaff, AZ	W 34–24	10,982	
September 17	Boise State	Walkup Skydome; Flagstaff, AZ	L 21–24 ^{2OT}	20,383	
October 1	at No. 12 Idaho	Kibbie Dome; Moscow, ID	L 20–31	16,100	
October 8	at No. 5 Nevada	Mackay Stadium; Reno, NV	L 28–31	14,025	
October 15	at No. 11 Montana	Washington–Grizzly Stadium; Missoula, MT	L 26–33 ^{2OT}	11,813	
October 22	Idaho State^{†}	Walkup Skydome; Flagstaff, AZ	W 27–7	9,688	
October 29	at Montana State	Sales Stadium; Bozeman, MT	W 28–17	9,777	
November 3	Northern Iowa*	Walkup Skydome; Flagstaff, AZ	W 25–12	11,545	
November 12	at Nicholls State*	John L. Guidry Stadium; Thibodaux, LA	L 5–23	5,685	
November 19	Weber State	Walkup Skydome; Flagstaff, AZ	W 27–21	5,748	
*Non-conference game; ^{†}Homecoming; Rankings from NCAA Division I-AA Football Committee Poll released prior to the game
