= Daniel Bukvich =

American composer and musician

- Born: 1954 (age 71–72); Butte, Montana, United States
- Education: Montana State University; University of Idaho
- Occupations: Composer, Percussionist, Educator
- Years active: 1978–present
- Employer: University of Idaho
- Known for: Composition, Percussion instruction, Jazz performance
- Notable work: Two symphonies, Marimba Sonata, Clarinet, Viola, and Xylophone Concertos

Daniel Bukvich (born 1954) is an American composer and percussionist. He has been a professor of percussion and music theory at the Lionel Hampton School of Music at the University of Idaho since 1978. He is heavily involved in the Lionel Hampton Jazz Festival and DancersDrummersDreamers, both major events on campus.

== Early life ==
Bukvich was born in 1954 in Butte, Montana. He completed his undergraduate studies at Montana State University and earned a Master of Music in composition from the University of Idaho.

== Teaching career ==
Bukvich began teaching at the University of Idaho in 1978. He runs the percussion studio, teaches freshman music theory and aural skills, and directs the jazz choir. He also performs with the Palouse Jazz Project, a faculty jazz ensemble, and teaches the university's jazz theory course.

== Compositions ==
Bukvich has composed pieces for the music school's wind ensemble, orchestra, jazz choir, chorus, and percussion ensembles. His compositions include two symphonies, a marimba sonata, and concertos for clarinet, viola, and xylophone.

Composition or arrangement	Instruments	Year
A Child's Dream of a Star	Wind ensemble	
Agincourt Hymn	Wind ensemble	1987
Ballroom Portraits	Wind ensemble	2005
Before Thy Throne I Now Appear	Wind ensemble	1995
Buffalo Jump Ritual	Wind ensemble	2000
C Harmonic Requiem	Chorus, percussion accompaniment	2007
Casco Bay	Wind ensemble	
Celebrate Celebration	Wind ensemble	1993
Changing Concepts	Wind ensemble	
Channel One Suite	Marching band	
Concerto for Clarinet and Orchestral Winds	Orchestral winds, solo clarinet	1992
Concerto for Viola and Orchestra	Solo viola and orchestra	2003
Cowboys	Wind ensemble	1995
Deck the Halls	A capella	1998
Dinosaurs	Wind ensemble	1986
Divina Comedia	Choir, percussion	2009
Electricity	Wind ensemble	1997
Fanfare for 1990 Goodwill Games	Wind ensemble	
Fanfare for a Great Circle	Wind ensemble	
Fanfare in Song Form	Wind ensemble	
Four Phrases from Psalm 91	Solo soprano and piano with wind ensemble and chorus	1997
From the Journals of Lewis and Clark	Chorus and orchestra	1999
General and Practical Theory of Automata	Percussion ensemble	2006
Gypsies	Solo flute	
Hanukkah Children's Dance	Solo violin, orchestra	2008
Hymn of St. Francis	Wind ensemble	1993
Jingle Bells	A capella	2001
Just a Closer Walk With Thee	A capella	1997
Listen to the Lambs	Chorus	
Loolah	Chorus, auxiliary percussion	
Maine Vigils	Wind ensemble	
Mambo!	Jazz choir	
March of the Children's Guard	Wind ensemble	1997
March Zulu	Jazz choir/chorus	
Meditations on the Writings of Vasily Kandinsky	Wind ensemble	1996
Missa Africa	Jazz choir/chorus	2000
Missa de Montunos	Jazz choir, percussion	2005
Missa Minimalis	A capella	1996
Music for Percussion and Band	Wind ensemble	1996
Night City - Music for the Imaginary Film	Wind ensemble	1983
Our Father	Wind ensemble	1996
Percussion Symphony	Percussion ensemble	2000
Pop Music	A capella	1995
Rhythm	Wind ensemble	
Rock Music	Jazz choir/chorus	1995
Samba!	Jazz Choir/chorus	
Scenes from Childhood	Solo piano, orchestral winds	1983
Shenandoah	A capella	1996
Sing to the Lord a New Song	SATB, Organ, hand bells, brass, and percussion	1997
Sometimes I Feel Like a Motherless Child	SATB, solo violin, strings	1996
Sonata for Marimba	Solo marimba, optional orchestra	2001
Song of the Drum	Jazz choir/chorus	
Song of the River	Jazz choir/chorus	1998
Song Suite for Band	Wind ensemble	1988
Surprise, Pattern, Illusion: Prehistoric Cave Ceremonies	Solo flute, wind ensemble	
Symphony No. 1 (In Memoriam, Dresden, 1945)	Wind Ensemble	1978
The Bolero Factory	Percussion ensemble	2007
The Dream of Abraham	Wind ensemble	1993
The Glittering Hill	Orchestra and chorus	2001
The Twelve Days of Christmas	A capella	1997
The Virgin and Child with St. Anne	Wind ensemble	
Three Phrases from Yugoslav Folk Songs	Wind ensemble	2000
Threnos	Wind ensemble	
Time Travel	Wind ensemble	1995
Tower of the Winds	Wind ensemble	
Unusual Behavior in Ceremonies Involving Drums	Wind ensemble	1999
Voodoo	Wind ensemble	1984
When I'm Here with You	Chorus	1985
Xylophone Concerto	Wind ensemble	1979
