= 1988 Montana State Bobcats football team =

American college football season

1988 Montana State Bobcats football
- Conference: Big Sky Conference
- Record: 4–7 (4–4 Big Sky)
- Head coach: Earle Solomonson (2nd season)
- Home stadium: Sales Stadium

1988 Big Sky Conference football standings
	Conf.					Overall
Team	W		L		T	W		L		T
No. 1 Idaho $^	7	–	1	–	0	11	–	2	–	0
No. 16 Montana ^	6	–	2	–	0	8	–	4	–	0
No. 12 Boise State ^	5	–	3	–	0	8	–	4	–	0
Nevada	4	–	4	–	0	7	–	4	–	0
Northern Arizona	4	–	4	–	0	6	–	5	–	0
Weber State	4	–	4	–	0	5	–	6	–	0
Montana State	4	–	4	–	0	4	–	7	–	0
Eastern Washington	2	–	6	–	0	2	–	8	–	1
Idaho State	0	–	8	–	0	0	–	11	–	0
$ – Conference champion; ^ – NCAA Division I-AA playoff participant; Rankings from NCAA Division I-AA Poll

The 1988 Montana State Bobcats football team was an American football team that represented Montana State University in the Big Sky Conference (Big Sky) during the 1988 NCAA Division I-AA football season. In their second season under head coach Earle Solomonson, the Bobcats compiled a 4–7 record (4–4 against Big Sky opponents) and finished a four-way tie for fourth place in the Big Sky.

== Schedule ==
Date	Opponent	Site	Result	Attendance	Source
September 3	at Florida*	Florida Field; Gainesville, FL	L 0–69	69,121	
September 10	Mesa State*	Sales Stadium; Bozeman, MT	L 10–41	6,637	
September 17	at Eastern Washington	Joe Albi Stadium; Spokane, WA	W 35–13		
September 24	at Central Michigan*	Kelly/Shorts Stadium; Mount Pleasant, MI	L 10–48	18,516	
October 1	Idaho State	Sales Stadium; Bozeman, MT	W 45–37		
October 8	at No. 8 Idaho	Kibbie Dome; Moscow, ID	L 24–41	9,200	
October 15	No. 13 Boise State^{†}	Sales Stadium; Bozeman, MT	W 51–7	9,807	
October 22	No. 8 Nevada	Sales Stadium; Bozeman, MT	W 17–14	8,467	
October 29	Northern Arizona^{†}	Sales Stadium; Bozeman, MT	L 17–28	9,777	
November 5	at No. 20 Montana	Washington–Grizzly Stadium; Missoula, MT (rivalry)	L 3–17	15,142	
November 12	at Weber State	Wildcat Stadium; Ogden, UT	L 35–59	2,957	
*Non-conference game; ^{†}Homecoming; Rankings from NCAA Division I-AA Football Committee Poll released prior to the game
