= 1988 Montana Grizzlies football team =

American college football season

1988 Montana Grizzlies football

NCAA Division I-AA First Round, L 19–38 vs. Idaho
- Conference: Big Sky Conference
- Record: 8–4 (6–2 Big Sky)
- Head coach: Don Read (3rd season)
- Offensive coordinator: Tommy Lee (3rd season)
- Defensive coordinator: Bill Smith (3rd season)
- Home stadium: Washington–Grizzly Stadium

1988 Big Sky Conference football standings
	Conf.					Overall
Team	W		L		T	W		L		T
No. 1 Idaho $^	7	–	1	–	0	11	–	2	–	0
No. 16 Montana ^	6	–	2	–	0	8	–	4	–	0
No. 12 Boise State ^	5	–	3	–	0	8	–	4	–	0
Nevada	4	–	4	–	0	7	–	4	–	0
Northern Arizona	4	–	4	–	0	6	–	5	–	0
Weber State	4	–	4	–	0	5	–	6	–	0
Montana State	4	–	4	–	0	4	–	7	–	0
Eastern Washington	2	–	6	–	0	2	–	8	–	1
Idaho State	0	–	8	–	0	0	–	11	–	0
$ – Conference champion; ^ – NCAA Division I-AA playoff participant; Rankings from NCAA Division I-AA Poll

The 1988 Montana Grizzlies football team represented the University of Montana in the 1988 NCAA Division I-AA football season as a member of the Big Sky Conference. The Grizzlies were led by third-year head coach Don Read, played their home games at Washington–Grizzly Stadium and finished the season with a record of eight wins and four losses (8–4, 6–2 Big Sky).

== Schedule ==
Date	Opponent	Rank	Site	Result	Attendance	Source
September 3	Eastern New Mexico*		Washington–Grizzly Stadium; Missoula, MT	W 35–6	6,280	
September 10	South Dakota State*		Washington–Grizzly Stadium; Missoula, MT	W 41–16	7,602	
September 17	at Idaho State		ASISU MiniDome; Pocatello, ID	W 34–7	8,109	
September 24	No. 5 Idaho	No. 16	Washington–Grizzly Stadium; Missoula, MT (Little Brown Stein)	W 26–17	12,009	
October 1	at No. 10 Nevada	No. 6	Mackay Stadium; Reno, NV	L 3–27	15,220	
October 8	Eastern Washington	No. 13	Washington–Grizzly Stadium; Missoula, MT (EWU–UM Governors Cup)	W 30–6	9,145	
October 15	Northern Arizona	No. 11	Washington–Grizzly Stadium; Missoula, MT	W 33–26 ^{2OT}	11,813	
October 22	at Boise State	No. 12	Bronco Stadium; Boise, ID	L 28–31	19,059	
October 29	at Weber State		Wildcat Stadium; Ogden, UT	W 41–14	6,632	
November 5	Montana State	No. 20	Washington–Grizzly Stadium; Missoula, MT (rivalry)	W 17–3	15,142	
November 12	at No. 4 (D-II) Portland State*	No. 18	Civic Stadium; Portland, OR	L 0–21	13,934	
November 26	at No. 1 Idaho*	No. 16	Kibbie Dome; Moscow ID (NCAA Division I-AA First Round)	L 19–38	5,500	
*Non-conference game; Rankings from NCAA Division I-AA Football Committee Poll released prior to the game
