= 1988 Nevada Wolf Pack football team =

American college football season

1988 Nevada Wolf Pack football
- Conference: Big Sky Conference
- Record: 7–4 (4–4 Big Sky)
- Head coach: Chris Ault (13th season)
- Home stadium: Mackay Stadium

1988 Big Sky Conference football standings
	Conf.					Overall
Team	W		L		T	W		L		T
No. 1 Idaho $^	7	–	1	–	0	11	–	2	–	0
No. 16 Montana ^	6	–	2	–	0	8	–	4	–	0
No. 12 Boise State ^	5	–	3	–	0	8	–	4	–	0
Nevada	4	–	4	–	0	7	–	4	–	0
Northern Arizona	4	–	4	–	0	6	–	5	–	0
Weber State	4	–	4	–	0	5	–	6	–	0
Montana State	4	–	4	–	0	4	–	7	–	0
Eastern Washington	2	–	6	–	0	2	–	8	–	1
Idaho State	0	–	8	–	0	0	–	11	–	0
$ – Conference champion; ^ – NCAA Division I-AA playoff participant; Rankings from NCAA Division I-AA Poll

The 1988 Nevada Wolf Pack football team represented the University of Nevada, Reno during the 1988 NCAA Division I-AA football season. Nevada competed as a member of the Big Sky Conference (BSC). The Wolf Pack were led by 13th-year head coach Chris Ault and played their home games at Mackay Stadium.

== Schedule ==
Date	Time	Opponent	Rank	Site	Result	Attendance	Source
September 10		Northwestern State*	No. T–18	Mackay Stadium; Reno, NV	W 35–26	13,850	
September 17		at UC Davis*	No. T–18	Toomey Field; Davis, CA	W 28–16	8,400	
September 24		Murray State*		Mackay Stadium; Reno, NV	W 28–18	12,675	
October 1		No. 6 Montana	No. 10	Mackay Stadium; Reno, NV	W 27–3	15,220	
October 8		Northern Arizona^{†}	No. 5	Mackay Stadium; Reno, NV	W 31–28	14,025	
October 15		at Weber State	No. 6	Wildcat Stadium; Ogden, UT	L 31–37	7,860	
October 22		at Montana State	No. 8	Reno H. Sales Stadium; Bozeman, MT	L 14–17	8,467	
October 29		at Boise State	No. 17	Bronco Stadium; Boise, ID (rivalry)	L 28–40	22,178	
November 5	1:00 p.m.	No. 4 Idaho		Mackay Stadium; Reno, NV	L 31–32	16,410	
November 12		Eastern Washington		Mackay Stadium; Reno, NV	W 30–12	12,100	
November 19		at Idaho State		Holt Arena; Pocatello, ID	W 50–13	5,045	
*Non-conference game; ^{†}Homecoming; Rankings from NCAA Division I-AA Football Committee Poll released prior to the game; All times are in Pacific time
