= 1988 Idaho State Bengals football team =

American college football season

1988 Idaho State Bengals football
- Conference: Big Sky Conference
- Record: 0–11 (0–8 Big Sky)
- Head coach: Garth Hall (1st season)
- Home stadium: Holt Arena

1988 Big Sky Conference football standings
	Conf.					Overall
Team	W		L		T	W		L		T
No. 1 Idaho $^	7	–	1	–	0	11	–	2	–	0
No. 16 Montana ^	6	–	2	–	0	8	–	4	–	0
No. 12 Boise State ^	5	–	3	–	0	8	–	4	–	0
Nevada	4	–	4	–	0	7	–	4	–	0
Northern Arizona	4	–	4	–	0	6	–	5	–	0
Weber State	4	–	4	–	0	5	–	6	–	0
Montana State	4	–	4	–	0	4	–	7	–	0
Eastern Washington	2	–	6	–	0	2	–	8	–	1
Idaho State	0	–	8	–	0	0	–	11	–	0
$ – Conference champion; ^ – NCAA Division I-AA playoff participant; Rankings from NCAA Division I-AA Poll

The 1988 Idaho State Bengals football team represented Idaho State University as a member of the Big Sky Conference during the 1988 NCAA Division I-AA football season. Led by first-year head coach Garth Hall, the Bengals compiled an overall record of 0–11, with a mark of 0–8 in conference play, and finished ninth in the Big Sky.

== Schedule ==
Date	Opponent	Site	Result	Attendance	Source
September 10	at Utah*	Robert Rice Stadium; Salt Lake City, UT	L 16–41	28,422	
September 17	Montana	Holt Arena; Pocatello, ID	L 7–34	8,109	
September 24	No. 6 Cal State Northridge*	Holt Arena; Pocatello, ID	L 23–34	5,868	
October 1	at Montana State	Sales Stadium; Bozeman, MT	L 37–45		
October 8	at Weber State	Wildcat Stadium; Ogden, UT	L 13–34	6,742	
October 15	at Oregon*	Autzen Stadium; Eugene, OR	L 7–52	28,015	
October 22	at Northern Arizona	Walkup Skydome; Flagstaff, AZ	L 7–27	9,688	
October 29	Eastern Washington	Holt Arena; Pocatello, ID	L 3–35		
November 5	No. 17 Boise State	Holt Arena; Pocatello, ID	L 10–31	7,125	
November 12	at No. 2 Idaho	Kibbie Dome; Moscow ID (rivalry)	L 7–41	9,200	
November 19	Nevada	Holt Arena; Pocatello, ID	L 13–50	5,045	
*Non-conference game; Rankings from NCAA Division I-AA Football Committee Poll released prior to the game
