= 1988 Weber State Wildcats football team =

American college football season

1988 Weber State Wildcats football
- Conference: Big Sky Conference
- Record: 5–6 (4–4 Big Sky)
- Head coach: Mike Price (8th season)
- Home stadium: Wildcat Stadium

1988 Big Sky Conference football standings
| | Conf. | | | | | Overall |
| Team | W | | L | | T | W | | L | | T |
|---|---|---|---|---|---|---|---|---|---|---|
| No. 1 Idaho $^ | 7 | – | 1 | – | 0 | 11 | – | 2 | – | 0 |
| No. 16 Montana ^ | 6 | – | 2 | – | 0 | 8 | – | 4 | – | 0 |
| No. 12 Boise State ^ | 5 | – | 3 | – | 0 | 8 | – | 4 | – | 0 |
| Nevada | 4 | – | 4 | – | 0 | 7 | – | 4 | – | 0 |
| Northern Arizona | 4 | – | 4 | – | 0 | 6 | – | 5 | – | 0 |
| Weber State | 4 | – | 4 | – | 0 | 5 | – | 6 | – | 0 |
| Montana State | 4 | – | 4 | – | 0 | 4 | – | 7 | – | 0 |
| Eastern Washington | 2 | – | 6 | – | 0 | 2 | – | 8 | – | 1 |
| Idaho State | 0 | – | 8 | – | 0 | 0 | – | 11 | – | 0 |
$ – Conference champion; ^ – NCAA Division I-AA playoff participant; Rankings from NCAA Division I-AA Poll

The 1988 Weber State Wildcats football team represented Weber State University as a member of the Big Sky Conference during the 1988 NCAA Division I-AA football season. Led by eighth-year head coach Mike Price and senior quarterback Jeff Carlson, the Wildcats compiled an overall record of 5–6 with a mark of 4–4 in conference play, placing in a four-way tie for fourth place in the Big Sky.

== Schedule ==
| Date | Opponent | Site | Result | Attendance | Source |
|---|---|---|---|---|---|
| September 10 | at UTEP* | Sun Bowl; El Paso, TX | L 21–48 | 30,790 | |
| September 17 | No. 13 Nicholls State* | Wildcat Stadium; Ogden, UT | L 23–28 | 7,943 | |
| September 24 | Southern Utah* | Wildcat Stadium; Ogden, UT | W 49–30 | 8,143 | |
| October 1 | at No. 19 Boise State | Bronco Stadium; Boise, ID | L 27–31 | 20,890 | |
| October 8 | Idaho State | Wildcat Stadium; Ogden, UT | W 34–13 | 6,742 | |
| October 15 | No. 6 Nevada | Wildcat Stadium; Ogden, UT | W 37–31 | 7,860 | |
| October 22 | at No. 4 Idaho | Kibbie Dome; Moscow, ID | L 24–27 | 9,500 | |
| October 29 | Montana | Wildcat Stadium; Ogden, UT | L 14–41 | 6,632 | |
| November 5 | at Eastern Washington | Joe Albi Stadium; Spokane, WA | W 51–30 | 2,010 | |
| November 12 | Montana State | Wildcat Stadium; Ogden, UT | W 59–35 | 2,957 | |
| November 19 | at Northern Arizona | Walkup Skydome; Flagstaff, AZ | L 21–27 | 5,748 | |
*Non-conference game; Rankings from NCAA Division I-AA Football Committee Poll released prior to the game

== Roster ==
1988 Weber State Wildcats football team roster
| Players | | | Coaches |
|---|---|---|---|
| Offense: Pos. / # / Name / Class; QB / 16 / Ryan Schmindt / Jr | Defense: Pos. / # / Name / Class; FS / 41 / Jeff Sorensen / Sr | Special teams: Pos. / # / Name / Class | Head coach: Mike Price; Coordinators/assistant coaches: Bobby Petrino – Wide receiver/tight ends; Legend: (C) Team captain; (S) Suspended; (I) Ineligible; Injured; Redshirt |

== Team players in the NFL ==
| Player | Position | Round | Pick | NFL club |
|---|---|---|---|---|
| Jeff Carlson | Quarterback | 4 | 102 | Los Angeles Rams |
