= KZUU =

- Location in the United States Location in Washington
- Pullman, Washington; United States
- Broadcast area: The Palouse, SE Washington
- Frequency: 90.7 MHz

Programming
- Format: Educational

Ownership
- Owner: Washington State University

History
- First air date: September 20, 1979

Technical information
- Licensing authority: FCC
- Facility ID: 71036
- Class: A
- ERP: 420 watts
- HAAT: 30.4 meters (100 ft)
- Transmitter coordinates: 46°43′51.00″N 117°9′8.00″W

Links
- Public license information: Public file; LMS
- Website: Official Website

KZUU (90.7 FM) is a radio station broadcasting in an educational format in the northwest United States, licensed to Pullman, Washington. Serving the Palouse region, the station is currently owned by Washington State University in Pullman.

== About ==
KZUU is a non-commercial college radio station.

== History ==
KZUU began as a cable station, KAZU, in the spring of 1977 while the Federal Communications Commission (FCC) considered an application from the Associated Students of Washington State University (ASWSU) for a ten-watt FM license. The construction permit was granted in the spring of 1979, and the tower erected on top of the Compton Union Building (CUB) in August. After testing, the station went on the air from the CUB's third floor at 8:26 a.m. PDT on Thursday, September 20, the first day of registration for the fall 1979 semester.

== See also ==
- KUOI – at the University of Idaho in nearby Moscow
- KEXP – formerly KCMU at the University of Washington in Seattle
