= David Comer =

David J. Comer received the BSEE degree from San Jose State University, the MSEE degree from the University of California, Berkeley and the PhD from Washington State University. He spent five years with IBM's Advanced Systems Development Division working in the automatic speech recognition area and the automated warehousing area. Doctor Comer's academic career began as an assistant professor at the University of Idaho in 1964. He moved to the University of Calgary as an associate professor in 1966 and then to California State University, Chico in 1969 as a professor and dean of the engineering program. In 1981, he became a professor of electrical engineering at Brigham Young University, serving as department chair from 1990 to 1993. He retired from BYU in September 2017.

Comer's areas of interest include passive and active filter design, MOS amplifier design, wideband amplifier design, operation of MOS stages in the weak inversion region, and high-speed chip-to-chip communications. He has consulted for Intel, Lawrence Livermore National Labs, IBM, and Mobility Systems Inc. Eight patents have been applied for in Professor Comer's name, two by IBM and six by Intel.

Comer served on the statewide California Engineering Liaison Committee from 1970 to 1975. He also served on the Engineering Deans' Council of the California State Universities during this same period and served as chair of this council in 1972. He was invited to appear before a California state legislative committee to determine if engineering programs at state universities in Humboldt, San Francisco, and Chico should be terminated or continued. Comer's presentation influenced the decision to continue these programs.

Doctor Comer has authored twelve textbooks in the field of electronic circuit design some of which have been translated into the Chinese, Korean, and Portuguese languages. He has published over 100 research papers in the leading journals of his field. In addition to these publications, Comer was also invited to write two sections in the Encyclopedia of Physical Science and Technology and three chapters in CRC Handbooks in the electronics area. He is credited with the development of the narrowband inductorless phase-shift filter. and the loop gain modulator.

Comer was elevated to the grade of Fellow of the IEEE in 2005. He has received several awards during his career including the Professional Achievement Award at CSU, Chico in 1981. He was named the outstanding teacher in the department of electrical engineering at the University of Calgary in 1968 and at BYU in 1986 and 1987. He was twice named the outstanding teacher in the College of Engineering at BYU (1992, 2008) and also received the Karl G. Maeser Excellence in Teaching Award at BYU in 2005.
