= KUOI-FM =

- Moscow, Idaho; United States
- Broadcast area: North Central Idaho
- Frequency: 89.3 MHz
- Branding: KUOI FM Moscow

Programming
- Format: College radio

Ownership
- Owner: Associated Students of the University of Idaho (ASUI)

History
- First air date: November 12, 1945
- Former frequencies: 655 kHz (1945–1947); 660 kHz (1947–1968)
- Call sign meaning: "University of Idaho"

Technical information
- Licensing authority: FCC
- Facility ID: 69362
- Class: A
- ERP: 400 watts
- HAAT: -35 meters
- Transmitter coordinates: 46°43′42.5″N 117°0′25.5″W

Links
- Public license information: Public file; LMS
- Website: www.kuoi.org

KUOI-FM (89.3 FM) is a free–form, college radio station at the University of Idaho in Moscow, Idaho. KUOI is headquartered on the third floor of the Bruce Pitman Center (the former Student Union Building) at Sixth and Deakin streets, on the northeast edge of campus.

The station began operating in 1945, and began FM programming 23 years later in 1968, officially starting on Sunday, November 17.

KUOI began broadcasting in 1945 as an AM station with a two-watt transmitter at 655 kHz. It moved to 660 kHz at five watts in 1947; with the move to FM, it went to ten watts in 1968 at 89.3 MHz. It boosted up to fifty watts and stereo in 1977, and to 400 watts in January 1995.

== See also ==
- Campus radio
- KZUU, Washington State University, Pullman
- List of college radio stations in the United States
