= Lionel Hampton School of Music =

American Music School

Coordinates: 46°43′32″N 117°00′28″W

Location in the United States
Location in Idaho

The Lionel Hampton School of Music is the music school at the University of Idaho in Moscow, Idaho. The school is named after jazz vibraphonist Lionel Hampton.

== Naming ==
In 1984, Lionel Hampton performed at the University of Idaho's Jazz Festival, which bills itself as America's largest education-based jazz festival. Hampton was impressed with what he saw and was pleased to see the emphasis on education. He pledged his support to the University of Idaho's jazz festival and to help support jazz education. The festival was renamed the Lionel Hampton Jazz Festival in 1985.

Two years later, in 1987, the university's music school was also named after Hampton. Hampton considered it one of the greatest honors ever to be bestowed upon him.

== About the school ==
The Lionel Hampton School of Music is accredited by the National Association of Schools of Music. It was founded as a department in 1893, just four years after the University of Idaho came into existence. It was elevated to school status in 1969. The school's mission statement is to "serve as a professional school of choice in Idaho for undergraduate and graduate music programs and as an academic department within the College of Letters and Science offering liberal studies in music...". The Lionel Hampton School of Music is part of the College of Letters, Arts, and Social Sciences. The current Director of the school is Dr. Sean Butterfield.

== Degree programs ==
=== Undergraduate level ===
The Lionel Hampton School of Music offers the following undergraduate degrees. Each of these are available with an optional jazz emphasis.

Bachelor of Music in:

- Performance
- Composition
- Music education
- Business

Bachelor of Arts or Bachelor of Science in Applied Music

Academic minors in:

- Music
- Jazz Studies
- Musical Theatre

=== Graduate level ===
The School of Music offers the following graduate degrees:

Master of Music in:

- Vocal performance
- Instrumental performance
- Piano pedagogy and performance studies
- Music education
- Accompanying
- Composition

Master of Arts in music history

== Ensembles ==
The Lionel Hampton School of Music offers many ensembles for students to participate in. Students are also encouraged to form their own ensembles.

Audition-only ensembles:

- Vandaleers (concert choir)
- Jazz choir
- Wind ensemble
- Jazz band
- Opera/musical theater studio

Ensembles open to all students at the University of Idaho:

- Vandal marching band
- Concert band
- University Chorus
- Jazz choir

Chamber ensembles include:

- Bassoon
  Flute
  Trumpet
  Trombone
  Horn
  Tuba/euphonium
  percussion
  Saxophone

== Notable alumni ==
- Daniel Bukvich (M.M.), current faculty member

== Facilities ==
The Music Building is home to most faculty offices. It also holds all of the school's classrooms, including the lecture hall. There is also a recital hall, a rehearsal room, and storage facilities for most of the students' instruments.

Ridenbaugh Hall, a former women's dormitory and the oldest building on campus, contains two faculty offices, several graduate student offices, and practice rooms. The building is also used by the university's art department as a gallery.

Blake House, a former fraternity house and women's co-op. It contains more faculty offices, and a marching band storage area.
