= C. Scott Green =

19th President of University of Idaho

19th President of the University of Idaho
- Incumbent
- Assumed office July 1, 2019
- Preceded by: Chuck Staben

Personal details
- Born: Cumer Scott Green c. 1962 (age 63–64) Moscow, Idaho, U.S.
- Spouse: Gabriella Green
- Children: 2
- Education: University of Idaho (BS); Harvard University (MBA)

Cumer Scott Green (born c. 1962) is an American businessman and academic administrator serving as the 19th president of the University of Idaho (U of I) in Moscow, Idaho. Green took office on July 1, 2019, and has been characterized as a "non-traditional" choice for the role, as he has neither a doctorate nor a background in higher education. He taught finance at Hofstra University as an adjunct instructor in 2003 and 2004 but considers serving as the U of I president his first job in higher education. Within the first four years as president at the U of I, Green collaborated with faculty, staff, students, alumni, and other stakeholders to see the institution through crises, including financial deficits, the COVID-19 pandemic, and the 2022 murders of four students. Green went on to lead the U of I to the largest not-for-profit fundraising campaign in state history ($540 million) and in receiving R1 research designation in the 2025 Carnegie Classification of Institutions of Higher Education and in seeing record enrollments at the U of I for ten continuous semesters when student populations at many other rural universities in the nation were on the decline.

== Early life and education ==
Born in Moscow, Idaho, Green and his family lived with his paternal grandparents, Dr. Leon and Gwen Green, while his father attended the U of I College of Law. His grandfather served as professor and head of the physical education department and athletic director at the U of I. When Green's father graduated from the U of I in 1969, the family moved to Boise, Idaho.

Green graduated from Boise High School in 1980 and returned to Moscow that fall to attend the U of I as a third-generation Vandal. He was a member of Kappa Sigma fraternity and served as student body president. He received the Kappa Sigma Scholarship Leadership Awards in 1983 and 1984 and the Frank W. Childs IV Memorial Award for outstanding service to the U of I in 1984. He earned a bachelor's degree in accounting in 1984 from the U of I and a Masters in Business Administration from Harvard Business School in 1989.

== Career ==
Green began his career at Boise Cascade, a manufacturer of forest products headquartered in Boise, and traveled the country conducting financial and operational reviews. After completing his MBA at Harvard, he worked for Deloitte from 1989 to 1984, as part of its accelerated career program, and then took a position at Goldman Sachs, where he focused on operational controls and compliance. He served as director of operations for the Americas at ING Barings, and then served in a number of positions at international law firms, starting with Weil, Gotshal & Manges in 2003 as global head of audit and compliance before becoming chief administrative officer. He held the position of executive director at Wilmer Cutler Pickering Hale and Dorr, and CEO of Pepper Hamilton. Starting in 2015, he fulfilled the role of global chief operating and financial officer at one of the world's largest law firms, Hogan Lovells, based at their New York City office. Green oversaw and led all of the firm's worldwide operations for technology, conflicts, and finance functions, with a global responsibility of over 3,000 employees in more than 30 countries. He also served as a board member for the brewer Ballast Point on its sale to Constellation Brands.

In April 2019, the Idaho State Board of Education (SBOE) unanimously approved Green's appointment to the University of Idaho presidency at an annual salary of $420,000. Although that sum was significantly lower than in his previous roles, Green took the opportunity to address severe financial issues at his alma mater. The SBOE announced Green's appointment on April 11, 2019, and he signed a contract to immediately begin a non-paid consultantship through June 30, 2019 (the day before his official appointment began). He immediately started working with U of I leadership to gain knowledge about the institution's status on a variety of issues, most importantly the pending financial insolvency.

During Green's tenure as president, he collaborated with staff, faculty, students, community, state, and key stakeholders to achieve many accomplishments, including:

- Turning around a structural deficit of $20 million in one year and building the Vandal Hybrid budget model to establish a more strategic perspective to regain fiscal strength and provide a permanent funding plan for operations and infrastructure with an adequate reserve position.
- Working with Gritman Medical Center during the COVID-19 pandemic to set up an FDA-compliant academic research lab (CLIA) using qPCR-based (quantitative polymerase chain reaction) testing to safely open the U of I in the fall of 2020 when many other universities and colleges remained closed.
- Managing the university's response to and impacts of the devastating capital crimes against four U of I students.
- Achieving the designation as a Carnegie Classification of Institutions of Higher Education in 2025, setting the U of I as the first and only Idaho university to join the top research institutions in the United States.
- Raising over $540 million for the Brave. Bold. Unstoppable. campaign, the largest, non-profit fund raising endeavor in the State of Idaho's history, as of 2025.
- Focusing on an era of growth through new construction on campus and around the state to support student success and research initiatives. The new buildings included the ICCU Arena, Meat Science and Innovation Center, Seed Potato Germplasm Laboratory, Parma Research and Extension Center, graduate student housing, and the Center for Agriculture, Food, and the Environment (CAFE), the largest research dairy in the country.

In 2023, the SBOE and President Green initiated a deal with Apollo Global Management to create a non-profit in an effort to acquire the University of Phoenix. The metrics for the proposed $550 million purchase were favorable for the U of I in that it would generate $100 million in free cash flow and provide U of I students with world-class systems that Phoenix had invested over $600 million to develop. The U of I would absorb the adult education-focused platform ahead of expected demographic declines in traditional-aged students. The deal would involve the U of I converting the for-profit university into a non-profit, offering online enhancements for Idaho students, in addition to the U of I's traditional brick-and-mortar college experience. The University of Arizona (Ashford University) and Purdue University (Kaplan University) had previously set precedent for this type of deal between for-profit and non-profit universities, but not without push back from their respective faculty and other stakeholders. In 2019, the Federal Trade Commission accused Phoenix of deceptive advertising that exaggerated the benefits of the education it provided. In May 2023, the SBOE unanimously agreed to allow the U of I to establish the non-profit and move forward.

After the U of I announced the deal, voiced concerns resulted in political opposition to the deal and a lawsuit brought by Idaho's attorney general. In October 2023, Idaho Attorney General Raul Labrador subpoenaed the entire SBOE and others involved in the transaction, including Green, demanding a number of records related to the University of Phoenix acquisition. In August 2023, Ada County District Court Judge Jason Scott ruled that neither the Idaho attorney general, nor the solicitor general was allowed to prosecute a case against the SBOE in an open meetings law case. The case was heard by the Idaho State Supreme Court and remanded back to the lower court. The SBOE and the attorney general agreed to a settlement. In June 2025, the U of I and Phoenix agreed to end the deal, with the U of I stating it had become cost-prohibitive and continuing discussions could become a distraction from the university's other work. The U of I requested the SBOE terminate the agreement. The U of I received over $17.2 million in termination fees from the Phoenix as reimbursement for expenses incurred during the talks. As of the end of September 2025, plans were confirmed for the sale of shares to the public, where the University of Phoenix was valued at nearly $1.2 billion.

In 2023, Green coauthored the book University President's Crisis Handbook with Temple Kinyon, published by Wiley, to highlight the U of I managing three crises (budget deficits, COVID-19, and the capital crimes) in his first four years as president.

== Personal life ==
Green and his wife, Gabriella, have two adult children, Nicholas and Christina.

Green has served on a number of committees and boards outside of his professional career, including:

- U of I Foundation (2014–2016).
- U of I College of Business and Economics Advisory Board (2009–2015).
- U of I Alumni Relations Board of Directors (1999–2005).
- Stepping Stones Board to help mental health needs in the Palouse (2021–present).

== Honors and recognition ==
- Institute of Internal Auditors Outstanding Contributor Award, 2004, 2005
- American Institute of Certified Public Accountants (AICPA) Business & Industry Hall of Fame, 2006
- University of Idaho Hall of Fame Award, 2009
- 50 Most Innovative in Past 50 Years–American Lawyer Magazine, 2013
- Ellis Island Medal of Honor, 2014
- Council for Advancement in Higher Education (CASE) Executive Leadership Award, 2024
- John. G. Tower Award–Kappa Sigma fraternity, 2025
- Mount Borah Visionary Leader Award, Idaho Technology Council, 2025.
