= Bobbie Thomas =

American fashion journalist

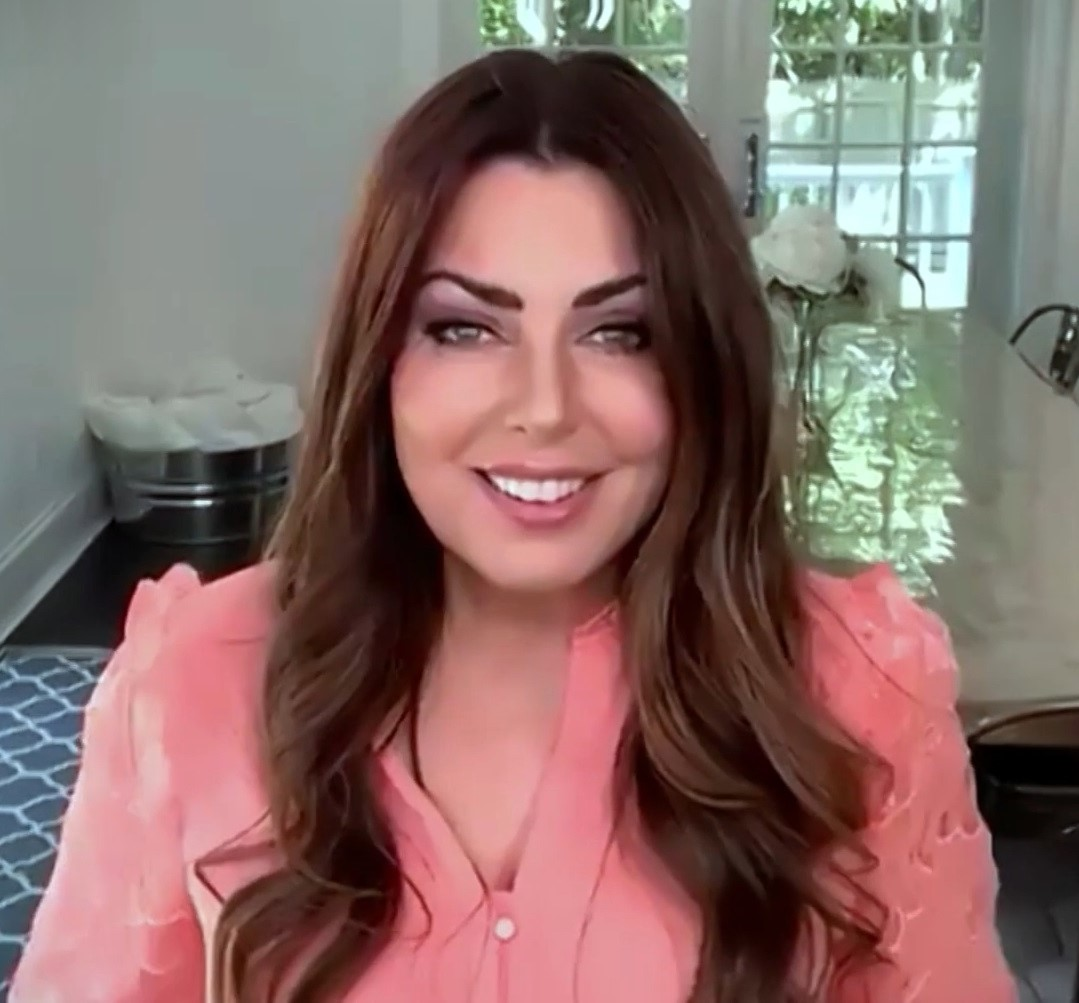
Thomas in 2021

Bobbie Thomas is an American fashion journalist. She is the Style Editor for NBC's Today Show. She has been considered a beauty and fashion expert for over a decade, and has appeared on TV shows including E! Red Carpet coverage, Style Network's Fashion Police, The View and The Wendy Williams Show. Her national column, "the Buzz" appeared in In Touch Weekly Magazine. "Bobbie's Buzz" later aired weekly on TODAY with Kathie Lee Gifford and Hoda Kotb.

== Early life ==
Bobbie Thomas was born October 23, 1974, in Providence, Rhode Island, and raised bi-coastal between New England and Los Angeles. Thomas received a Bachelor of Science in Psychology from the University of Idaho. During three years of graduate studies, Thomas volunteered as an advocate and counselor at the Valley Trauma Center, a rape crisis treatment facility.

== Career ==
From FOX and CNN to VH1 and MTV, Thomas has shared tips, tricks and Hollywood secrets with a wide audience. She has appeared on a variety of E! Entertainment specials, including their annual red-carpet Emmy, Golden Globe, Screen Actors Guild, and Academy Awards coverage. She also co-hosted Fashion Police on the Style Network with Robert Verdi.

As the Style Editor of NBC's Today Show, her weekly TodayShow.com Style Buzz articles have become a popular fixture for the Fashion & Beauty section, and are often pulled to also appear on MSN.com and MSN messenger, as well as MSNBC.com's home page.

Her work with national clothing retailers has included fashion commentary for both the youth and adult market and presently she serves as Simon Property Group's Style Expert, visiting malls across the United States and hosting events.

In the fall of 2009, Thomas launched Bobbie.com. The blog features a variety of Thomas' styling ideas, Do-It-Yourself projects and houses an archive of her Today Show segments.

In 2010, Thomas signed on to lead a team of women in the "Latisse Wishes Challenge" benefitting the Make-a-Wish foundation.

== Personal life ==
Thomas dated N Sync member JC Chasez during the group's prime between 1998 and 2001. In March 2012, Thomas got engaged to lawyer Michael Marion. The couple was married on May 31, 2013 at Kathie Lee Gifford's home in Connecticut. On December 3, 2014, Thomas announced that she was pregnant with her first child via IVF. Their son Miles Thomas Marion was born in 2015. The two had a long-haired chihuahua named Chica. In 2019, Marion suffered an ischemic stroke and Thomas began sharing his recovery journey with viewers and followers. Michael Marion died on December 1, 2020.
