= Marvin Washington =

American football player (born 1965)

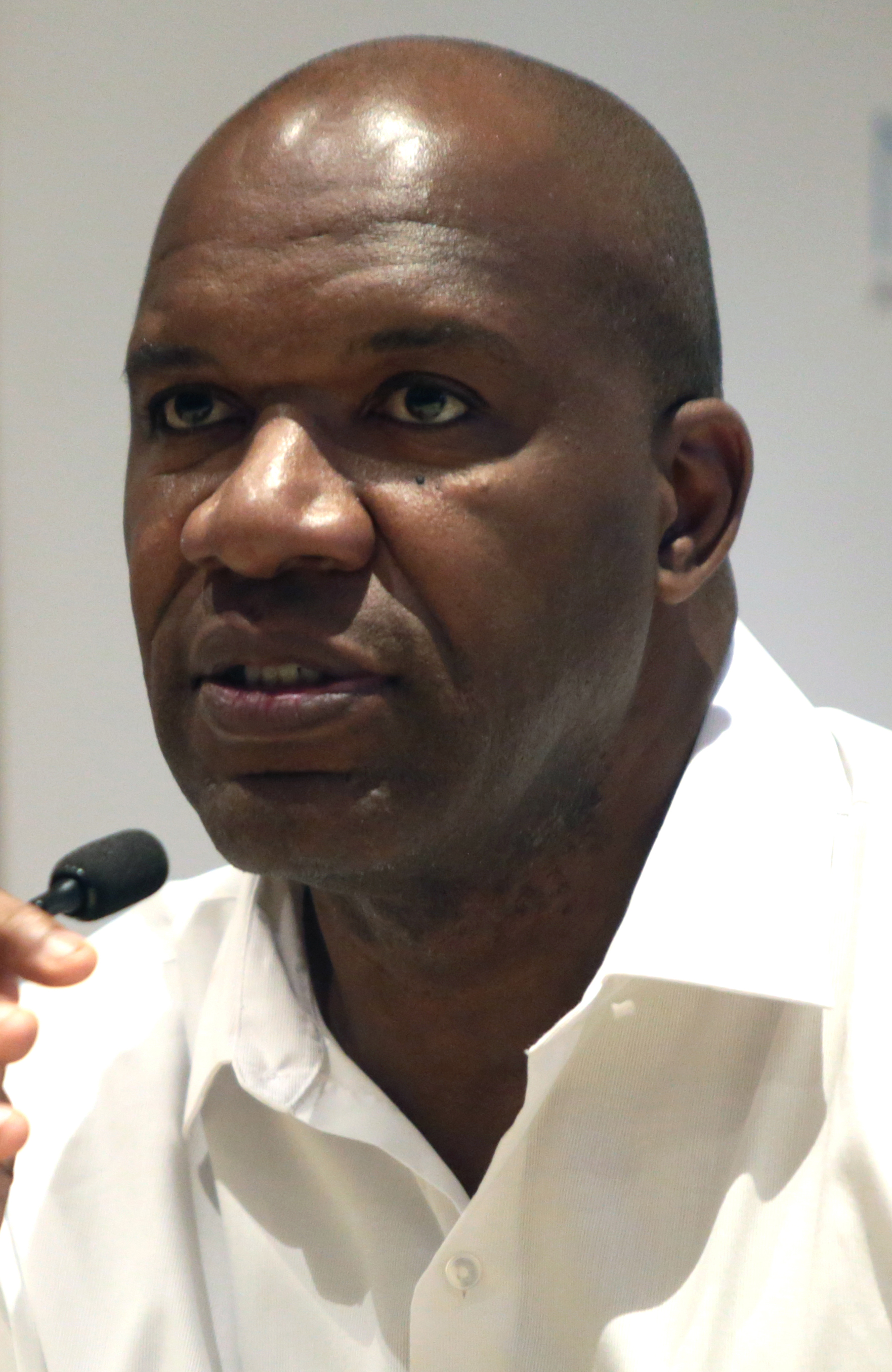
- Washington in 2016

No. 95, 97
- Position: Defensive end

Personal information
- Born: October 22, 1965 (age 61); Denver, Colorado, U.S.
- Listed height: 6 ft 6 in (1.98 m)
- Listed weight: 285 lb (129 kg)

Career information
- High school: Kimball (Dallas, Texas)
- College: Idaho, Hinds JC (MS) (& UTEP basketball)
- NFL draft: 1989: 6th round, 151st overall pick

Career history
- New York Jets (1989–1996); San Francisco 49ers (1997); Denver Broncos (1998); San Francisco 49ers (1999)

Awards and highlights
- Super Bowl champion (XXXIII)

Career NFL statistics
- Sacks: 40.5
- Games played: 155
- Games started: 96
- Stats at Pro Football Reference

Marvin Andrew Washington (born October 22, 1965) is an American former professional football player who was a defensive end for 11 seasons in the National Football League (NFL). He was selected in the sixth round of the 1989 NFL draft, and played eight seasons for the New York Jets of which he was a starter for six. He additionally played for the Denver Broncos and San Francisco 49ers, accumulating a total of 40.5 sacks in 155 games played during his career. Washington played both college football and basketball for the Idaho Vandals.

== College career ==
Out of Kimball High School in Dallas, Texas, Washington went to the University of Texas-El Paso on a basketball scholarship. After two years, he transferred to Hinds Junior College in Mississippi, where he played football in 1987. Washington then went west to the University of Idaho in Moscow to play for head basketball coach Tim Floyd; he had recruited Washington to UTEP while an assistant coach for the Miners.

At Idaho, Washington played basketball for two seasons under head coaches Floyd and Kermit Davis and football for a season in 1988 under Keith Gilbertson. In his senior year of 1988–89, the Idaho Vandals won Big Sky conference titles in both sports and advanced to the NCAA postseason: the I-AA semifinals in football and the Division I basketball tournament. He recorded a school record 14.5 sacks that year playing the right defensive end position. In 2007, Washington was inducted into the Vandal Athletics Hall of Fame.

== Professional career ==
Washington was selected in the sixth round of the 1989 NFL draft by the New York Jets, the 151st overall pick. He played a total of eight seasons for the Jets, the last six as a starter. Washington recorded a career-high (and team-high) 8.5 sacks in 1992, and a career-high 71 tackles the following year.

After his time with the Jets, Washington played a season for the San Francisco 49ers, a season for the Denver Broncos (with whom he won a Super Bowl ring), and returned to the 49ers for his final year in 1999. He finished his career with 40.5 sacks, 386 tackles, and 10 forced fumbles in 155 games played, 96 of which he started.

== Medical cannabis advocacy ==
Washington is an advocate for the medical use of cannabis and an entrepreneur in the cannabis industry. In 2017, he was part of a lawsuit filed against Attorney General Jeff Sessions, seeking to overturn the classification of cannabis as a Schedule I drug. Washington is a board member of Athletes for Care, a group that advocates for athletes on issues of health and safety including the use of cannabis as medicine.

In November 2021, Washington began hosting an online educational show about cannabis named 5th Quarter. The show focuses in particular on the use of cannabis by athletes.
