= Timothy P. White =

Academic administrator and kinesiologist

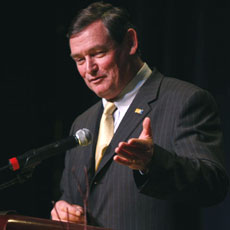
- White in 2008

7th Chancellor of the California State University System
- In office 2012–2020
- Preceded by: Charles B. Reed
- Succeeded by: Joseph I. Castro

8th Chancellor of the University of California, Riverside
- In office 2008–2012
- Preceded by: France A. Córdova
- Succeeded by: Kim A. Wilcox

16th President of the University of Idaho
- In office 2004–2008
- Preceded by: Gary Michael (interim), Robert Hoover (1996–2003)
- Succeeded by: Steven Daley-Laursen, (interim), M. Duane Nellis (2009–2013)

Personal details
- Born: Timothy Peter White; July 9, 1949 (age 77) Buenos Aires, Argentina
- Spouse: Dr. Karen White
- Education: Diablo Valley College; California State University, Fresno (BA); California State University, East Bay (MA); University of California, Berkeley (PhD)
- Profession: Kinesiologist, Academic Administrator
- Website: Chancellor Timothy P. White

Academic background
- Thesis: Influence of metabolic rate upon the metabolism of lactic acid and the oxidation of glucose, alanine and leucine (1977)

Academic work
- Discipline: physiology, kinesiology, and human biodynamics
- Institutions: University of California, Berkeley; University of Michigan; Oregon State University; University of Idaho; University of California, Riverside; California State University

Timothy Peter White (born July 9, 1949) is a retired academic administrator and kinesiologist. He served as the chancellor of the California State University system from December 2012 to December 2020. He was the chancellor of the Riverside campus of the University of California from 2008 to 2012.

== Academic background ==
White's academic background is in physiology, kinesiology, and human biodynamics, with an emphasis on work in muscle plasticity, injury, and aging.

He was a first-generation college student who attended public institutions in California. He began his college career at Diablo Valley Community College in Pleasant Hill, then received his B.A. from Fresno State University, his master's degree from Cal State Hayward, and earned his Ph.D. at UC Berkeley.

After earning his Ph.D., White spent two years as a post-doctoral scholar in physiology at the University of Michigan before starting his academic career at Ann Arbor.

== Career ==
White held positions as professor and chair of the Department of Human Biodynamics at UC Berkeley, and as professor and chair of the Department of Movement Science and research scientist in the Institute of Gerontology at the University of Michigan. He served at Oregon State University in Corvallis as provost and executive vice president, with an interim appointment as president.

White was named the 16th president of the University of Idaho in February 2004, and took office in August. His leadership on the Moscow campus entailed reinvesting resources in support of five key academic priorities: science and technology, liberal arts and sciences, entrepreneurial innovation, the environment, and sustainable design and lifestyle.

In 2012 he became chancellor of the 23-campus California State University system - the largest 4-year public university system in the United States, making him the first Latino to run the system. He launched Graduation Initiative 2025, aimed at increasing graduation rates for first-time and transfer students. In 2019 CSU reported that graduation rates for these groups had hit an all-time high. In October 2019 White announced that he would retire effective June 30, 2020.

== Personal ==
Born in Buenos Aires, Argentina, White immigrated to Canada and then to California with his parents when he was young. He was the first in his family to go to college. In May 2011 he appeared on the CBS show Undercover Boss.

During his transition to Idaho in 2004, White had unplanned heart surgery in late May in Corvallis. Experiencing chest pains, he checked himself into Good Samaritan Hospital, had a heart attack, and was rushed into emergency quintuple bypass surgery. His recovery delayed his start in Moscow from July to August.

== Awards and honors ==
Partial list of awards and honors

- 2022 Clark Kerr Award for distinguished leadership in higher education from the UC Berkeley Academic Senate
- 1999 - 2000 President, American Academy of Kinesiology and Physical Education
- 1998 American College of Sports Medicine Citation Award
- 1997 Alumni of the year, Fresno State University
- 1994 - 1995 President, American College of Sports Medicine
- 1992 Fellow, American Academy of Kinesiology and Physical Education
- 1989 Sigma Xi
- 1983 Fellow, American College of Sports Medicine
- 1981 American College of Sports Medicine New Investigator Award
- 1970 Graduated magna cum laude, Fresno State University
