= 1988 Idaho Vandals football team =

American college football season

1988 Idaho Vandals football

Big Sky champion

NCAA Division I-AA First Semifinal, L 7–28 at Furman
- Conference: Big Sky Conference

Ranking
- AP: No. 1
- Record: 11–2 (7–1 Big Sky)
- Head coach: Keith Gilbertson (3rd season)
- Offensive coordinator: Bill Diedrick (3rd season)
- Defensive coordinator: Barry Lamb (2nd season)
- Home stadium: Kibbie Dome

1988 Big Sky Conference football standings
	Conf.					Overall
Team	W		L		T	W		L		T
No. 1 Idaho $^	7	–	1	–	0	11	–	2	–	0
No. 16 Montana ^	6	–	2	–	0	8	–	4	–	0
No. 12 Boise State ^	5	–	3	–	0	8	–	4	–	0
Nevada	4	–	4	–	0	7	–	4	–	0
Northern Arizona	4	–	4	–	0	6	–	5	–	0
Weber State	4	–	4	–	0	5	–	6	–	0
Montana State	4	–	4	–	0	4	–	7	–	0
Eastern Washington	2	–	6	–	0	2	–	8	–	1
Idaho State	0	–	8	–	0	0	–	11	–	0
$ – Conference champion; ^ – NCAA Division I-AA playoff participant; Rankings from NCAA Division I-AA Poll

The 1988 Idaho Vandals football team represented the University of Idaho in the 1988 NCAA Division I-AA football season. The Vandals, led by third-year head coach Keith Gilbertson, were members of the Big Sky Conference and played their home games at the Kibbie Dome, an indoor facility on campus in Moscow, Idaho.

The Vandals won their third conference title in four seasons, and made the I-AA playoffs for the fourth consecutive season. Led by redshirt junior quarterback John Friesz, Idaho finished the regular season at 9–1 and 7–1 in the Big Sky. The Vandals scheduled only ten regular season games for the first time since 1969; Idaho played only ten regular season games again in 1995, which was their final year in the Big Sky until they rejoined the conference in 2018.

The shortened regular season was beneficial in 1988, as the Vandals played three post-season games, falling on the road in the national semifinals in Gilbertson's final game as the Vandals' head coach. He left for an assistant's position in the Pac-10 in Seattle, as offensive line coach under head coach Don James at Washington.

== Notable games ==
Following a sole loss on the road to conference rival Montana, Idaho won its final seven games of the regular season. The Vandals defeated Nevada for a second consecutive year, only the third time in the eleven meetings since the Wolf Pack joined the Big Sky in 1979. The Vandals defeated rival Boise State for the seventh consecutive year, the seventh of twelve straight over the Broncos. Idaho entered the post-season with the top ranking in Division I-AA.

== Division I-AA playoffs ==
For the fourth consecutive season, Idaho returned to the I-AA playoffs. In the first round, the Vandals hosted conference foe Montana, who had handed the Vandals their only defeat. The Vandals won the rematch 38–19 at the Kibbie Dome two days after Thanksgiving. Idaho also hosted in the quarterfinals, and defeated Northwestern State (La.) 38–30, but lost quarterback John Friesz with an ankle sprain in the third quarter.

In the semifinals Idaho was eliminated 38–7 on the road at Furman in Greenville, South Carolina, ending the Vandals' season at 11–2. With their third-string quarterback and many other reserves playing against the top-ranked defense in Division I-AA, the Vandals were only down 10–0 at the half, but the score mounted to 38–0 before the Vandals scored. The Vandal defense gave up 320 rushing yards to the Paladins. Furman went on to win the I-AA title the following week.

== Notable players ==
The 1988 team included three future NFL players with lengthy pro careers: defensive end Marvin Washington, guard Mark Schlereth, and junior John Friesz, the future collegiate hall of fame quarterback was a three-year starter (1987–89). Washington was on a basketball scholarship and this was his only season of Vandal football.

== Schedule ==
Date	Time	Opponent	Rank	Site	Result	Attendance	Source
September 10	7:00 pm	No. 2 (D-II) Portland State*	No. 9	Kibbie Dome; Moscow ID	W 27–18	10,100	
September 17	6:30 pm	at Pacific (CA)*	No. 9	Pacific Memorial Stadium; Stockton, CA	W 36–26	13,868	
September 24	12:00 pm	at No. 16 Montana	No. 5	Washington–Grizzly Stadium; Missoula, MT (Little Brown Stein)	L 17–26	12,009	
October 1	1:30 pm	Northern Arizona^{†}	No. 12	Kibbie Dome; Moscow, ID	W 31–20	16,100	
October 8	7:00 pm	Montana State	No. 8	Kibbie Dome; Moscow, ID	W 41–24	9,200	
October 15	2:00 pm	at Eastern Washington	No. 7	Joe Albi Stadium; Spokane, WA	W 31–22	6,644	
October 22	7:00 pm	Weber State	No. 4	Kibbie Dome; Moscow, ID	W 27–24	9,500	
November 5	1:00 pm	at Nevada	No. 4	Mackay Stadium; Reno, NV	W 32–31	16,410	
November 12	7:00 pm	Idaho State	No. 2	Kibbie Dome; Moscow, ID (rivalry)	W 41–7	9,200	
November 19	1:30 pm	at No. 13 Boise State	No. 2	Bronco Stadium; Boise, ID (rivalry)	W 26–20	23,687	
November 26	1:00 pm	No. 16 Montana*	No. 1	Kibbie Dome; Moscow, ID (NCAA Division I-AA First Round)	W 38–19	5,500	
December 3	1:00 pm	No. 8 Northwestern State*	No. 1	Kibbie Dome; Moscow, ID (NCAA Division I-AA Quarterfinal)	W 38–30	6,800	
December 10	10:30 am	at No. 4 Furman*	No. 1	Paladin Stadium; Greenville, SC (NCAA Division I-AA Semifinal)	L 7–38	11,645	
*Non-conference game; ^{†}Homecoming; Rankings from NCAA Division I-AA Football Committee Poll released prior to the game; All times are in Pacific time

== Roster ==
1988 Idaho Vandals football team roster
Players
Coaches
Offense

Pos.	#	Name	Class
WR	16	Lee Allen	Jr
WR		Kasey Dunn	Fr
WR	7	John Jake	Sr
QB		Steve Nolan	So
QB	17	John Friesz	Jr
QB	15	Andy Beitia	Fr
RB		Damon Daniels	So
RB		Bruce Harris	So
RB		Devon Pearce	Fr
TE	94	Chris Slater	Sr
OT	70	Greg Hale	Sr
G	63	Troy Wright	Jr
G	66	Chris Hoff	So
C	52	Steve Unger	Jr
G	60	Mark Schlereth	Sr
OT		Todd Neu	Jr

Defense

Pos.	#	Name	Class
CB	1	Richard Carey	Sr
CB	23	Charlie Oliver	So
FS		John Pleas	Sr
SS		Brian Smith	Sr
LB		Jerry Medved	Sr
LB		Jim Medved	Sr
LB	43	Roger Cecil	So
DE		Jim Routos	So
DT	93	Mike Zeller	Jr
DT		Kord Smith	Jr
DE	90	Marvin Washington	Sr
DE	87	Jeff Robinson	Fr

Special teams

Pos.	#	Name	Class
K		Thane Doyle
P		John Pleas	Sr

Head coach

- Keith Gilbertson (3rd year)

Coordinators/assistant coaches

- Bill Diedrick (OC)
- Barry Lamb (DC)
- Mike Cox (LB)

Legend

- (C) Team captain
- (S) Suspended
- (I) Ineligible
- Injured
- Redshirt

== All-conference ==
Quarterback John Friesz and tackle Greg Hale returned to the all-conference team as unanimous selections. Also on the first team were wide receiver John Jake, center Steve Unger, defensive end Marvin Washington, and safety Brian Smith. Vandals on the second team were tackle Todd Neu, guard Mark Schlereth, cornerback Richard Carey, and linebackers Roger Cecil and Jerry Medved. Honorable mention were wide receiver Lee Allen, guard Troy Wright, running back Bruce Harris, placekicker Thayne Doyle, and defensive linemen Kord Smith, Jim Routos, and Mike Zeller.

Friesz repeated as the Big Sky's outstanding offensive player, and was a first-team Kodak All-American in Division I-AA.

== NFL draft ==
Two Vandal seniors were selected in the 1989 NFL draft, which lasted twelve rounds (335 selections).

Player	Position	Round	Overall	Franchise
Marvin Washington	DE	6th	151	New York Jets
Mark Schlereth	G	10th	263	Washington Redskins

One Vandal junior was selected in the following year's draft in 1990, also twelve rounds (332 selections).

Player	Position	Round	Overall	Franchise
John Friesz	QB	6th	138	San Diego Chargers
