= Lionel Hampton Jazz Festival =

Annual jazz festival in Moscow, Idaho

Location in the United States
Location in Idaho

The Lionel Hampton Jazz Festival is an annual jazz festival, the largest west of the Mississippi River, that takes place in April on the campus of the University of Idaho in Moscow, Idaho.

In 2007, the festival was awarded the National Medal of Arts, the nation's most prestigious arts award.

== About the festival ==
The Lionel Hampton Jazz Festival is a modern tradition at the University of Idaho in Moscow. Dating from 1967, the festival was greatly expanded by Lynn "Doc" Skinner, who was involved since 1972, and took over as the director in 1977. Doc Skinner retired in 2006. In 2010 Steven Remington joined Artistic Director John Clayton as executive director. Each year in February, thousands of college, high school, junior high, and elementary school students travel from all over North America to the campus on the Palouse in north Idaho to meet great jazz performers, partake in vocal and instrumental adjudicated performances, and attend concerts and workshops.

The first UI Jazz Festival was a single-day event consisting of fifteen student groups and one jazz artist in a sole evening concert. The festival now runs four days and features multiple concerts spread throughout the campus. Some of the jazz greats who have performed at the festival include Ella Fitzgerald, Gerry Mulligan, Dizzy Gillespie, Elvin Jones, Freddie Hubbard, Dianne Reeves, Stan Getz, Carmen McRae, Joey DeFrancesco, Benny Green, Abbey Lincoln, Hank Jones, Roy Hargrove, Diana Krall, Wynton Marsalis, Tower of Power, and Sarah Vaughan and of course the eponymous Lionel Hampton and his New York Big Band, who first played at the festival in 1984. The festival was renamed for Hampton in 1985, and the UI's school of music was renamed for him in 1987.

== Student Performance Evaluations ==
The student performances span four days and typically involve up to 5,000 students from nearly 200 schools, plus music educators, parents, supporters, and friends. Elementary, middle and junior high school vocal and instrumental groups participate in Wednesday intensives; Thursday is a mix of college and elementary students, and Friday is focused on high school vocal groups. High school instrumentalists are featured on Saturday.

Students' evaluated performances and workshops are held at more than twenty sites on the UI campus and in the town of Moscow. The outstanding ensembles, determined by the Performance Evaluation Clinicians (PECs), perform at the afternoon concerts on Thursday, Friday and Saturday on the Kibbie Dome main stage. Outstanding instrumental soloists take to Hamp's Stage prior to the evening concerts.

== Workshops ==
Workshops by guest artists are a major emphasis of the jazz festival. The workshops provide an opportunity for jazz masters and students to meet in casual yet structured settings. Artists have the freedom to discuss, perform, demonstrate techniques, and answer questions. Nearly every guest artist presents at least one clinic during the festival. After his clinic at the 1997 festival, guitarist Herb Ellis said the festival was the only one of its kind in the world where jazz greats had the chance to sit down with students and directly share their experience and knowledge.

== Legacy ==
The festival, besides establishing itself as one of the premier festivals of its kind in the world, also spawned similar protégé festivals such as the Sitka Jazz Festival in Sitka, Alaska.

== See also ==
- List of jazz festivals
