= Malcolm Renfrew =

- Born: October 12, 1910; Spokane, Washington, US
- Died: October 12, 2013 (aged 103); Moscow, Idaho, US
- Resting place: First Presbyterian Church Columbarium, Moscow, Idaho
- Education: University of Idaho (B.S., M.S.); University of Minnesota (Ph.D.)
- Known for: Teflon (production)
- Spouse: Carol J. Campbell Renfrew (m. 1938–2010, her death)
- Awards: ACS Chemical Health & Safety Award
- Scientific career
- Fields: Chemistry
- Workplaces: University of Idaho
- Doctoral advisor: George Glockler

Malcolm MacKenzie Renfrew (October 12, 1910 – October 12, 2013) was an American polymer chemist, inventor, and professor emeritus at the University of Idaho in Moscow, Idaho. Renfrew Hall, the university's chemistry building, was named for him in 1985.

Renfrew is noted for his contribution to the development of Teflon, including the first paper on the subject. In 1946 he spoke on behalf of DuPont at the American Chemical Society (ACS) meeting at which Teflon was announced.

== Early life ==
Born in Spokane, Washington, Renfrew was the elder of two sons of Earl and Elsie MacKenzie Renfrew. Earl was an accountant and the family later moved to the Palouse at Colfax, and then across the Idaho border to nearby Potlatch in 1923.

Renfrew graduated from Potlatch High School in 1928 and attended the University of Idaho in nearby Moscow, where he joined the Phi Gamma Delta fraternity and wrote for The Argonaut, the student newspaper. Originally interested in journalism, he switched his major to chemistry and graduated with a B.S. in 1932 and an M.S. in 1934. He then traveled to the Midwest to continue his studies and earned a Ph.D. from the University of Minnesota in Minneapolis in 1938.

== Career ==
After gaining his doctorate, Renfrew worked for DuPont in New Jersey, where he produced a number of patents on polymethyl methacrylate, including one on photopolymerization, material for tooth repair, as well as epoxy resins and the first method of synthesis of poly(tetrafluoroethylene) in a form which was suitable for the commercial production of Teflon. It had been accidentally invented in 1938 by DuPont chemist Roy Plunkett, as a by-product of chlorofluorocarbon refrigerant research.

After further industrial experience with General Mills Company back in Minneapolis and Spencer Kellogg & Sons, Inc. in Buffalo, Renfrew returned west in 1959 to his alma mater in Moscow to head the UI Department of Physical Science. This was split into separate departments of physics and chemistry in 1967, with Renfrew as the Head of Chemistry, a position he retained until 1973; he retired in 1976 and became professor emeritus.

== Honors ==
In 1976, he was made a Fellow of the American Chemical Society. Well known for his research, Renfrew was praised for his work on chemical safety and as an educator, both recognized in the ACS 1985 Chemical Health and Safety Award for "his publications and column on Chemical Safety in the Journal of Chemical Education". In 2006 he received the Distinguished Science Communicator award.

Renfrew was also an artist: an exhibition of his paintings was held in Moscow City Hall in November–December 2010. His 100th birthday, October 12, 2010, was declared as "Malcolm M. Renfrew Day" in the state by Governor Butch Otter. Part of the celebration was the rededication of Renfrew Hall, the chemistry building named for him a quarter century earlier. Opened 62 years ago in 1964 as the Physical Sciences Building ("Phy-Sci"), it was renamed "Renfrew Hall" in October 1985 for his 75th birthday.

== Personal ==
Shortly after gaining his doctorate, he married Carol Joy Campbell (September 19, 1913 – January 12, 2010), on June 26, 1938. A member of Kappa Alpha Theta sorority, she was a 1935 B.S. economics graduate of the University of Idaho from Rosalia, Washington. Born on a farm near Fairfield, Washington, at the time of her death at age 96, they had been married for over 71 years.

Renfrew was an Elder of the Presbyterian Church, a gifted watercolorist, and played the trombone. He was a member of the Idaho Vandals Non-Marching Pep Band and the "Hog Heaven Big Band." ("Hog Heaven" was an early name for Moscow, due to plentiful camas roots.)

Renfrew died at his residence in Moscow at Good Samaritan Village on October 12, 2013, his 103rd birthday. His mother Elsie (1889–1987) lived to age 98, and his younger brother Edgar (1915–2010), who also had a doctorate in chemistry, reached age 95.
