= Lambert Trophy =

Lambert Trophy may refer to:

- Lambert-Meadowlands Trophy, and the Lambert Cup, annual awards given to the best team in the East in the various divisions of American college football
- Jack Lambert Trophy, an annual award given by the Touchdown Club of Columbus to the top American collegiate linebacker
