= 1988 Cornell Big Red football team =

American college football season

1988 Cornell Big Red football

Ivy League co-champion
- Conference: Ivy League
- Record: 7–2–1 (6–1 Ivy)
- Head coach: Maxie Baughan (6th season)
- Offensive coordinator: Eddie Wilson (6th season)
- Defensive coordinator: Pete Noyes (8th season)
- Captains: Doug Langan; Scott Malaga; Mike McGrann
- Home stadium: Schoellkopf Field

1988 Ivy League football standings
	Conf.					Overall
Team	W		L		T	W		L		T
Penn +	6	–	1	–	0	9	–	1	–	0
Cornell +	6	–	1	–	0	7	–	2	–	1
Princeton	4	–	3	–	0	6	–	4	–	0
Dartmouth	4	–	3	–	0	5	–	5	–	0
Yale	3	–	3	–	1	3	–	6	–	1
Columbia	2	–	5	–	0	2	–	8	–	0
Harvard	2	–	5	–	0	2	–	8	–	0
Brown	0	–	6	–	1	0	–	9	–	1
+ – Conference co-champions

The 1988 Cornell Big Red football team represented Cornell University in the 1988 NCAA Division I-AA football season as a member of the Ivy League. The Big Red were led by sixth-year head coach Maxie Baughan and played their home games at Schoellkopf Field. The Big Red finished the season 7–2–1 overall and 6–1 in Ivy League play to win Cornell's second Ivy League championship, sharing the title with Penn.

Cornell began the season dubbed by sports analysts to have Ivy League championship potential and coach Maxie Baughan described his team as "the sleeping giant of the Ivy League." The Big Red eventually entered the final week of the season, in which they would face their undefeated rival Penn, having lost two games and tied one; Penn was the last remaining undefeated Division I-AA football team in 1988 and had won or shared the Ivy League title five times in the previous six seasons. During the game, which Cornell would have to win to share the conference title with Penn, nine personal fouls were assessed between the two teams. Cornell eventually broke a 3–3 halftime tie to deliver Penn's first defeat of the season and win a share of the Ivy League title for the first time since 1971.

The 1988 season was Maxie Baughan's sixth and final season as head coach of the Cornell Big Red; he resigned in early 1989 after allegations surfaced that the married Baughan had a romantic relationship with top assistant coach Peter Noyes' wife. Baughan cited "personal tensions" as the rationale for his decision. Assistant coach Jack Fouts was appointed head coach shortly thereafter.

== Schedule ==
Date	Opponent	Site	Result	Attendance	Source
September 17	Princeton	Schoellkopf Field; Ithaca, NY	L 17–26	12,000	
September 24	Colgate*	Schoellkopf Field; Ithaca, NY (rivalry)	W 17–14	14,000	
October 1	at Lehigh*	Goodman Stadium; Bethlehem, PA	L 14–27	13,000	
October 8	at Harvard	Harvard Stadium; Boston, MA	W 19–17	2,000	
October 15	Brown	Schoellkopf Field; Ithaca, NY	W 35–0	11,000	
October 22	at Dartmouth	Memorial Field; Hanover, NH (rivalry)	W 24–7	3,222	
October 29	at Lafayette*	Fisher Field; Easton, PA	T 21–21	9,500	
November 5	Yale	Schoellkopf Field; Ithaca, NY	W 26–0	15,000	
November 12	at Columbia	Wien Stadium; New York, NY (rivalry)	W 42–19	8,308	
November 19	Penn	Schoellkopf Field; Ithaca, NY (rivalry)	W 19–6	18,000	
*Non-conference game
