= 1988 Colgate Red Raiders football team =

American college football season

1988 Colgate Red Raiders football
- Conference: Colonial League
- Record: 2–9 (2–3 Colonial)
- Head coach: Michael Foley (1st season)
- Captains: Mike Cote; Matt Jaworski
- Home stadium: Andy Kerr Stadium

1988 Colonial League football standings
	Conf.					Overall
Team	W		L		T	W		L		T
Lafayette $	5	–	0	–	0	8	–	2	–	1
No. 19 Holy Cross	3	–	1	–	0	9	–	2	–	0
Lehigh	2	–	3	–	0	6	–	5	–	0
Bucknell	2	–	3	–	0	3	–	7	–	0
Colgate	2	–	3	–	0	2	–	9	–	0
Davidson	0	–	4	–	0	0	–	10	–	0
$ – Conference champion; Rankings from NCAA Division I-AA Football Committee poll

The 1988 Colgate Red Raiders football team was an American football team that represented Colgate University during the 1988 NCAA Division I-AA football season. Colgate tied for third in the Colonial League.

In its first season under head coach Michael Foley, the team compiled a 2–9 record. Mike Cote and Matt Jaworski were the team captains.

The Red Raiders were outscored 271 to 169. Their 2–3 conference record placed Colgate in a three-way tie for third (and for next-to-last) in the six-team Colonial League standings.

The team played its home games at Andy Kerr Stadium in Hamilton, New York.

== Schedule ==
Date	Opponent	Site	Result	Attendance	Source
September 10	New Hampshire*	Andy Kerr Stadium; Hamilton, NY	L 7–21	4,000	
September 17	at Bucknell	Memorial Stadium; Lewisburg, PA	W 14–13	2,120	
September 24	at Cornell*	Schoellkopf Field; Ithaca, NY (rivalry)	L 14–17	14,000	
October 1	No. 8 Lafayette	Andy Kerr Stadium; Hamilton, NY	L 34–42	6,200	
October 8	at Lehigh	Goodman Stadium; Bethlehem, PA	L 19–24	11,400	
October 15	at Penn*	Franklin Field; Philadelphia, PA	L 22–33	9,700	
October 22	Davidson	Andy Kerr Stadium; Hamilton, NY	W 21–0	950	
October 29	Holy Cross	Andy Kerr Stadium; Hamilton, NY	L 0–7	4,500	
November 5	at Princeton*	Palmer Stadium; Princeton, NJ	L 13–45	2,000	
November 12	at William & Mary*	Cary Field; Williamsburg, VA	L 3–28	9,758	
November 19	at Rutgers*	Rutgers Stadium; Piscataway, NJ	L 22–41	14,415	
*Non-conference game; Rankings from NCAA Division I-AA Football Committee Poll released prior to the game
