= 1988 Yale Bulldogs football team =

American college football season

1988 Yale Bulldogs football
- Conference: Ivy League
- Record: 3–6–1 (3–3–1 Ivy)
- Head coach: Carmen Cozza (24th season)
- Home stadium: Yale Bowl

1988 Ivy League football standings
	Conf.					Overall
Team	W		L		T	W		L		T
Penn +	6	–	1	–	0	9	–	1	–	0
Cornell +	6	–	1	–	0	7	–	2	–	1
Princeton	4	–	3	–	0	6	–	4	–	0
Dartmouth	4	–	3	–	0	5	–	5	–	0
Yale	3	–	3	–	1	3	–	6	–	1
Columbia	2	–	5	–	0	2	–	8	–	0
Harvard	2	–	5	–	0	2	–	8	–	0
Brown	0	–	6	–	1	0	–	9	–	1
+ – Conference co-champions

The 1988 Yale Bulldogs football team represented Yale University in the 1988 NCAA Division I-AA football season. The Bulldogs were led by 24th-year head coach Carmen Cozza, played their home games at the Yale Bowl and finished in fifth place in the Ivy League with a 3–3–1 record, 3–6–1 overall.

== Schedule ==
Date	Opponent	Site	Result	Attendance	Source
September 17	at Brown	Brown Stadium; Providence, RI	T 24–24	15,017	
September 24	Connecticut*	Yale Bowl; New Haven, CT	L 0–41	24,522	
October 1	at Navy*	Navy–Marine Corps Memorial Stadium; Annapolis, MD	L 7–41	31,067	
October 8	Army*	Yale Bowl; New Haven, CT	L 18–33	17,898	
October 15	Columbia	Yale Bowl; New Haven, CT	W 24–10	16,346	
October 22	at Penn	Franklin Field; Philadelphia, PA	L 3–10	28,279	
October 29	Dartmouth	Yale Bowl; New Haven, CT	W 22–13	17,351	
November 5	at Cornell	Schoellkopf Field; Ithaca, NY	L 0–26	15,000	
November 12	Princeton	Yale Bowl; New Haven, CT (rivalry)	L 7–24	23,688	
November 19	at Harvard	Harvard Stadium; Boston, MA (The Game)	W 26–17	36,000	
*Non-conference game
