= 2015 Princeton Tigers football team =

American college football season

2015 Princeton Tigers football
- Conference: Ivy League
- Record: 5–5 (2–5 Ivy)
- Head coach: Bob Surace (6th season)
- Offensive coordinator: James Perry (6th season)
- Offensive scheme: Spread option
- Co-defensive coordinators: Steve Verbit (3rd season); Jim Salgado (3rd season)
- Base defense: 3–3–5 or 4–2–5
- Home stadium: Powers Field at Princeton Stadium

2015 Ivy League football standings
	Conf.			Overall
Team	W		L	W		L
No. 20 Harvard +	6	–	1	9	–	1
No. 23 Dartmouth +	6	–	1	9	–	1
Penn +	6	–	1	7	–	3
Yale	3	–	4	6	–	4
Brown	3	–	4	5	–	5
Princeton	2	–	5	5	–	5
Columbia	1	–	6	2	–	8
Cornell	1	–	6	1	–	9
+ – Conference co-champions; Rankings from STATS Poll

The 2015 Princeton Tigers football team represented Princeton University in the 2015 NCAA Division I FCS football season. They were led by sixth-year head coach Bob Surace and played their home games at Powers Field at Princeton Stadium. Princeton was member of the Ivy League. They finished the season 5–5 overall and 2–5 in Ivy League play to place sixth. Princeton averaged 8,265 fans per gam.

== Legacy Bowl ==
During the off season, Princeton participated in the 2015 Legacy Bowl. The team traveled to the Kincho Stadium in Nishinomiya, Hyōgo, Japan to play Kwansei Gakuin University of the Kansai Collegiate American Football League. Princeton won 36–7.

== Schedule ==
Date	Time	Opponent	Site	TV	Result	Attendance
September 19	6:00 p.m.	at Lafayette*	Fisher Stadium; Easton, PA		W 40–7	9,173
September 26	5:00 p.m.	Lehigh*	Powers Field at Princeton Stadium; Princeton, NJ		W 52–26	15,023
October 2	7:00 p.m.	Columbia	Powers Field at Princeton Stadium; Princeton, NJ	NBCSN	W 10–5	3,694
October 10	1:00 p.m.	Colgate*	Powers Field at Princeton Stadium; Princeton, NJ		W 44–20	6,457
October 17	12:00 p.m.	at Brown	Brown Stadium; Providence, RI	ASN	L 31–38	6,481
October 24	12:00 p.m.	at No. 15 Harvard	Harvard Stadium; Boston, MA (rivalry)	ASN	L 7–42	17,444
October 31	3:30 p.m.	Cornell	Powers Field at Princeton Stadium; Princeton, NJ	ASN	W 47–21	4,528
November 7	12:00 p.m.	at Penn	Franklin Field; Philadelphia, PA (rivalry)	ASN	L 23–26 ^{OT}	11,017
November 14	1:00 p.m.	Yale	Powers Field at Princeton Stadium; Princeton, NJ (rivalry)		L 28–35	11,623
November 21	Noon	at No. 21 Dartmouth	Memorial Field; Hanover, NH	ASN	L 10–17	6,208
*Non-conference game; Rankings from STATS Poll released prior to the game; All times are in Eastern time
