= Michael Foley (American football) =

American football player and coach (born 1955)

Biographical details
- Born: October 5, 1955 (age 71)

Playing career
- 1974–1977: Colgate
- Position: Offensive lineman

Coaching career (HC unless noted)
- 1978: Bates (OL)
- 1979: Dartmouth (freshmen OL)
- 1980: Holy Cross (OL)
- 1981–1982: Colgate (JV HC / WR)
- 1983: Colgate (OL)
- 1984–1987: Colgate (OL/DC)
- 1988–1992: Colgate
- 1994–1996: Harvard (OC)
- 1997–2005: Colgate (OC/OL)
- 2006–2011: UConn (OL)
- 2012–2013: UConn (TE)
- 2013–2015: UConn (OL)
- 2016–2018: UMass (OL)

Head coaching record
- Overall: 21–34

Accomplishments and honors

Awards
- 2× Second-team All-East (1976, 1977)

Michael F. Foley (born October 5, 1955) is an American football coach. He was the offensive line coach at the University of Massachusetts Amherst. Foley served as the head football coach at Colgate University for five seasons from 1988 until 1992, compiling a record of 21–34.

== Head coaching record ==
Year	Team	Overall	Conference	Standing	Bowl/playoffs
Colgate Red Raiders (Colonial League / Patriot League) (1988–1992)
1988	Colgate	2–9	2–3	T–3rd	
1989	Colgate	4–7	1–3	T–4th	
1990	Colgate	7–4	3–2	T–2nd	
1991	Colgate	4–7	3–2	T–2nd	
1992	Colgate	4–7	2–3	T–3rd	
Colgate:		21–34	14–13		
Total:		21–34			
