= 1988 Dartmouth Big Green football team =

American college football season

1988 Dartmouth Big Green football
- Conference: Ivy League
- Record: 5–5 (4–3 Ivy)
- Head coach: Buddy Teevens (2nd season)
- Defensive coordinator: John Lyons (1st season)
- Captains: David Gazzaniga; Paul Michael
- Home stadium: Memorial Field

1988 Ivy League football standings
	Conf.					Overall
Team	W		L		T	W		L		T
Penn +	6	–	1	–	0	9	–	1	–	0
Cornell +	6	–	1	–	0	7	–	2	–	1
Princeton	4	–	3	–	0	6	–	4	–	0
Dartmouth	4	–	3	–	0	5	–	5	–	0
Yale	3	–	3	–	1	3	–	6	–	1
Columbia	2	–	5	–	0	2	–	8	–	0
Harvard	2	–	5	–	0	2	–	8	–	0
Brown	0	–	6	–	1	0	–	9	–	1
+ – Conference co-champions

The 1988 Dartmouth Big Green football team was an American football team that represented Dartmouth College during the 1988 NCAA Division I-AA football season. The Big Green tied for third in the Ivy League.

In its second under head coach Eugene "Buddy" Teevens, the team compiled a 5–5 record and outscored opponents 209 to 190. David Gazzaniga and Paul Michael were the team captains.

The Big Green's 4–3 conference tied for third in the Ivy League standings. Dartmouth outscored Ivy opponents 166 to 137.

Dartmouth played its home games at Memorial Field on the college campus in Hanover, New Hampshire.

== Schedule ==
Date	Opponent	Site	Result	Attendance	Source
September 17	Penn	Memorial Field; Hanover, NH	L 27–33	7,917	
September 24	Lehigh*	Memorial Field; Hanover, NH	L 16–41	7,924	
October 1	at Davidson*	Richardson Stadium; Davidson, NC	W 24–3	2,000	
October 8	at Holy Cross*	Fitton Field; Worcester, MA	L 3–17	850	
October 15	Harvard	Memorial Field; Hanover, NH (rivalry)	W 38–7	15,015	
October 22	Cornell	Memorial Field; Hanover, NH (rivalry)	L 7–24	3,222	
October 29	at Yale	Yale Bowl; New Haven, CT	L 13–22	17,351	
November 5	Columbia	Wien Stadium; New York, NY	W 20–10	3,760	
November 12	at Brown	Brown Stadium; Providence, RI	W 37–24	7,300	
November 19	at Princeton	Palmer Stadium; Princeton, NJ	W 24–17	8,500	
*Non-conference game
