= 1988 Columbia Lions football team =

American college football season

1988 Columbia Lions football
- Conference: Ivy League
- Record: 2–8 (2–5 Ivy)
- Head coach: Larry McElreavy (3rd season)
- Captain: John Alex
- Home stadium: Wien Stadium

1988 Ivy League football standings
	Conf.					Overall
Team	W		L		T	W		L		T
Penn +	6	–	1	–	0	9	–	1	–	0
Cornell +	6	–	1	–	0	7	–	2	–	1
Princeton	4	–	3	–	0	6	–	4	–	0
Dartmouth	4	–	3	–	0	5	–	5	–	0
Yale	3	–	3	–	1	3	–	6	–	1
Columbia	2	–	5	–	0	2	–	8	–	0
Harvard	2	–	5	–	0	2	–	8	–	0
Brown	0	–	6	–	1	0	–	9	–	1
+ – Conference co-champions

The 1988 Columbia Lions football team was an American football team that represented Columbia University during the 1988 NCAA Division I-AA football season. Columbia ended a five-year losing streak with two wins, and tied for next-to-last in the Ivy League.

In their third and final season under head coach Larry McElreavy, the Lions compiled a 2–8 record and were outscored 303 to 140. John Alex was the team captain.

The Lions' 2–5 conference record tied for sixth in the Ivy League standings. Columbia was outscored 177 to 103 by Ivy opponents.

After losing all of their games in 1984, 1985, 1986 and 1987, Columbia entered the season on a 44-game winless streak, and 41-game loss streak, dating back to the 1983 season. Both were all-time NCAA Division I football records at the time. By registering a victory over Princeton in the fourth week of the 1988 season, Columbia ended the streak at 44 straight losses and 47 games without a win.

Columbia played its homes games at Lawrence A. Wien Stadium in Upper Manhattan, in New York City.

Senior wide receiver Matthew Fox would later go on to a successful acting career.

== Schedule ==
Date	Opponent	Site	Result	Attendance	Source
September 17	at Harvard	Harvard Stadium; Boston, MA	L 7–41	9,000	
September 24	No. 12 Lafayette*	Wien Stadium; New York, NY	L 3–49	6,560	
October 1	at Penn	Franklin Field; Philadelphia, PA	L 10–24	11,640	
October 8	Princeton^{†}	Wien Stadium; New York, NY	W 16–13	5,420	
October 15	at Yale	Yale Bowl; New Haven, CT	L 10–24	16,346	
October 22	Bucknell*	Wien Stadium; New York, NY	L 7–21	3,825	
October 29	at Lehigh*	Goodman Stadium; Bethlehem, PA	L 27–56	7,250	
November 5	at Dartmouth	Memorial Field; Hanover, NH	L 10–20	3,760	
November 12	Cornell	Wien Stadium; New York, NY (rivalry)	L 19–42	8,308	
November 19	Brown	Wien Stadium; New York, NY	W 31–13	5,565	
*Non-conference game; ^{†}Homecoming; Rankings from the latest NCAA Division I-AA poll released prior to the game
