= 1988 Harvard Crimson football team =

American college football season

1988 Harvard Crimson football
- Conference: Ivy League
- Record: 2–8 (2–5 Ivy)
- Head coach: Joe Restic (18th season)
- Captain: Donald C. Peterson
- Home stadium: Harvard Stadium

1988 Ivy League football standings
	Conf.					Overall
Team	W		L		T	W		L		T
Penn +	6	–	1	–	0	9	–	1	–	0
Cornell +	6	–	1	–	0	7	–	2	–	1
Princeton	4	–	3	–	0	6	–	4	–	0
Dartmouth	4	–	3	–	0	5	–	5	–	0
Yale	3	–	3	–	1	3	–	6	–	1
Columbia	2	–	5	–	0	2	–	8	–	0
Harvard	2	–	5	–	0	2	–	8	–	0
Brown	0	–	6	–	1	0	–	9	–	1
+ – Conference co-champions

The 1988 Harvard Crimson football team was an American football team that represented Harvard University during the 1988 NCAA Division I-AA football season. The Crimson tied for next-to-last in the Ivy League.

In their 18th year under head coach Joe Restic, the Crimson compiled a 2–8 record and were outscored 272 to 202. Donald C. Peterson was the team captain.

Harvard's 2–5 conference record tied for sixth in the Ivy League standings. The Crimson were outscored 168 to 131 by Ivy opponents.

Harvard played its home games at Harvard Stadium in the Allston neighborhood of Boston, Massachusetts.

== Schedule ==
Date	Opponent	Site	Result	Attendance	Source
September 17	Columbia	Harvard Stadium; Boston, MA	W 41–7	9,000	
September 24	UMass*	Harvard Stadium; Boston, MA	L 28–45	7,500	
October 1	at Holy Cross*	Fitton Field; Worcester, MA	L 20–35	12,441	
October 8	Cornell	Harvard Stadium; Boston, MA	L 17–19	2,000	
October 15	at Dartmouth	Memorial Field; Hanover, NH (rivalry)	L 7–38	15,015	
October 22	at Princeton	Palmer Stadium; Princeton, NJ (rivalry)	L 8–23	17,400	
October 29	Brown	Harvard Stadium; Boston, MA	W 28–3	14,900	
November 5	Boston University*	Harvard Stadium; Boston, MA	L 23–24	6,500	
November 12	at No. 19 Penn	Franklin Field; Philadelphia, PA	L 13–52	37,612	
November 19	Yale	Harvard Stadium; Boston, MA (The Game)	L 17–26	36,000	
*Non-conference game; Rankings from NCAA Division I-AA Football Committee Poll released prior to the game
