= 2015 Cornell Big Red football team =

American college football season

2015 Cornell Big Red football
- Conference: Ivy League
- Record: 1–9 (1–6 Ivy)
- Head coach: David Archer (3rd season)
- Offensive coordinator: Roy Istvan (2nd season)
- Defensive coordinator: Jared Backus (3rd season)
- Captains: JJ Fives; Luke Hagy; Rush Imhotep; Miles Norris
- Home stadium: Schoellkopf Field

2015 Ivy League football standings
	Conf.			Overall
Team	W		L	W		L
No. 20 Harvard +	6	–	1	9	–	1
No. 23 Dartmouth +	6	–	1	9	–	1
Penn +	6	–	1	7	–	3
Yale	3	–	4	6	–	4
Brown	3	–	4	5	–	5
Princeton	2	–	5	5	–	5
Columbia	1	–	6	2	–	8
Cornell	1	–	6	1	–	9
+ – Conference co-champions; Rankings from STATS Poll

The 2015 Cornell Big Red football team represented Cornell University during the 2015 NCAA Division I FCS football season as a member of the Ivy League. They were led by third-year head coach David Archer and played their home games at Schoellkopf Field. Cornell finished the season 1–9 overall and 1–6 in Ivy League play to tie for seventh place. Cornell averaged 8,124 fans per game.

== Schedule ==
Date	Time	Opponent	Site	TV	Result	Attendance
September 19	3:00 p.m.	Bucknell*^{†}	Schoellkopf Field; Ithaca, NY		L 14–19	16,057
September 26	1:00 p.m.	at Yale	Yale Bowl; New Haven, CT	ILDN	L 26–33	15,926
October 2	7:00 p.m.	Colgate*	Schoellkopf Field; Ithaca, NY (rivalry)		L 21–28	9,103
October 10	12:00 p.m.	No. 24 Harvard	Schoellkopf Field; Ithaca, NY	ASN	L 3–40	7,092
October 17	1:00 p.m.	at Sacred Heart*	Campus Field; Fairfield, CT		L 6–31	4,551
October 24	12:30 p.m.	Brown	Schoellkopf Field; Ithaca, NY		L 24–44	5,138
October 31	3:30 p.m.	at Princeton	Powers Field at Princeton Stadium; Princeton, NJ	ASN	L 21–47	4,528
November 6	8:00 p.m.	at No. 24 Dartmouth	Memorial Field; Hanover, NH (rivalry)	NBCSN	L 3–21	3,930
November 14	12:30 p.m.	Columbia	Schoellkopf Field; Ithaca, NY (rivalry)		W 3–0	3,233
November 21	1:00 p.m.	at Penn	Franklin Field; Philadelphia, PA (rivalry)		L 21–34	6,007
*Non-conference game; ^{†}Homecoming; Rankings from STATS Poll released prior to the game; All times are in Eastern time

== Game summaries ==
=== Bucknell ===
Bucknell vs. Cornell – Game summary

Quarter	1	2	3	4	Total
Bucknell	0	7	3	9	19
Cornell	0	7	0	7	14

at Schoellkopf Field

- Date: September 19
- Game time: 3:00 p.m. EDT
- Game weather: 73 °F (23 °C); mostly cloudy
- Game attendance: 16,057
- Referee: Warren Gillis
- Box Score

Game information

Second quarter

- BUCK – Will Carter, 11 yard pass from R.J. Nitti, John Burdick XP good, 12:34 (BUCK 7–0)
- COR – Luke Hagy, 20 yard run, 9:15 (TIE 7–7)

Third quarter

- BUCK – Burdick, 23 yard field goal, 7:08 (BUCK 10–7)

Fourth quarter

- COR – James Hubbard, 21 yard pass from Robert Somborn, Zach Mays XP good, 9:46 (COR 14–10)
- BUCK – Joey DeFloria, 14 yard pass from Nitti, Burdick XP good, 1:53 (BUCK 17–14)
- BUCK – 0 yard safety, 0:00 (BUCK 19–14)

=== Yale ===
Cornell vs. Yale – Game summary

Quarter	1	2	3	4	Total
Cornell	6	20	0	0	26
Yale	0	13	3	17	33

at Yale Bowl

- Date: September 26
- Game time: 1:00 p.m. EDT
- Game weather: 66 °F (19 °C); partly sunny
- Game attendance: 15,926
- Referee: Matt Overton
- TV: Ivy League Digital Network
- Box Score

Game information

First quarter

- COR – Julian Gallo, 7 yard pass from Robert Somborn, Zach Mays XP no good, 9:25 (COR 6–0)

Second quarter

- COR – Luke Hagy, 2 yard run, Mays XP blocked, 14:57 (COR 12–0)
- YALE – Roberts, 7 yard run, Holmes XP good, 12:21 (COR 12–7)
- COR – Collin Shaw, 37 yard pass from Somborn, Mays XP good, 9:59 (COR 19–7)
- COR – Shaw, 13 yard pass from Somborn, Mays XP good, 0:47 (COR 26–7)
- YALE – Drwal, 6 yard pass from Roberts, Holmes XP blocked, 0:32 (COR 26–13)

Third quarter

- YALE – Holmes, 26 yard field goal, 11:19 (COR 26–16)

Fourth quarter

- YALE – Holmes, 37 yard field goal, 11:09 (COR 26–19)
- YALE – Clemons III, 8 yard pass from Roberts, Holmes XP good, 1:12 (TIE 26–26)
- YALE – Little, 52 yard pass from Roberts, Holmes XP good, 0:32 (YALE 33–26)

=== Colgate ===
Colgate vs. Cornell – Game summary

Quarter	1	2	3	4	Total
Colgate	7	14	7	0	28
Cornell	0	7	0	14	21

at Schoellkopf Field

- Date: October 2
- Game time: 7:00 p.m. EDT
- Game weather: 49 °F (9 °C); overcast
- Game attendance: 9,103
- Referee: Jeff Gray
- Box Score

Game information

First quarter

- COL – A. Greenawalt, 12 yard pass from Jake Melville, Jonah Bowman XP good, 1:10 (COL 7–0)

Second quarter

- COL – John Wilkins, 3 yard run, Bowman XP good, 10:23 (COL 14–0)
- COR – Luke Hagy, 79 yard run, Joe Pierik XP good, 10:09 (COL 14–7)
- COL – John Maddaluna, 17 yard pass from Melville, Bowman XP good, 1:14 (COL 21–7)

Third quarter

- COL – Melville, 2 yard run, Bowman XP good, 8:53 (COL 28–7)

Fourth quarter

- COR – James Hubbard, 27 yard pass from Robert Somborn, Pierik XP good, 12:34 (COL 28–14)
- COR – Hagy, 1 yard run, Pierik XP good, 4:03 (COL 28–21)

=== Harvard ===
Harvard vs. Cornell – Game summary

Quarter	1	2	3	4	Total
Harvard	7	10	17	6	40
Cornell	3	0	0	0	3

at Schoellkopf Field

- Date: October 10
- Game time: Noon EDT
- Game weather: 51 °F (11 °C); cloudy
- Game attendance: 7,092
- TV: ASN
- Box Score

Game information

First quarter

- COR – Joe Pierik, 33 yard field goal, 4:54 (COR 3–0)
- HAR – Ben Braunecker, 47 yard pass from Scott Hosch, Kenny Smart XP good, 4:37 (HAR 7–3)

Second quarter

- HAR – Anthony Firsker, 19 yard pass from Hosch, Smart XP good, 12:05 (HAR 14–3)
- HAR – Smart, 28 yard field goal, 0:39 (HAR 17–3)

Third quarter

- HAR – Paul Stanton, 2 yard run, Smart XP good, 11:19 (HAR 24–3)
- HAR – Shelton-Mosley, 46 yard pass from Hosch, Smart XP good, 6:30 (HAR 31–3)
- HAR – Smart, 28 yard field goal, 2:15 (HAR 34–3)

Fourth quarter

- HAR – Hosch, 3 yard run, Smart XP no good, 13:53 (HAR 40–3)

=== Sacred Heart ===
Cornell vs. Sacred Heart – Game summary

Quarter	1	2	3	4	Total
Cornell	0	6	0	0	6
Sacred Heart	3	14	7	7	31

at Campus Field

- Date: October 10
- Game time: 1:00 p.m. EDT
- Game weather: 52 °F (11 °C)
- Game attendance: 4,551
- Referee: Andrew Keenan
- Box Score

Game information

First quarter

- SHU – Alec Finney, 35 yard field goal, 12:05 (SHU 3–0)

Second quarter

- SHU – Connor Caveney, 1 yard pass from Tyler Dube, Finney XP good, 13:29 (SHU 10–0)
- COR – Josh Sweet, 3 yard run, Joe Pierik XP no good, 11:00 (SHU 10–6)
- SHU – Moses Webb, 7 yard pass from RJ Noel, Finney XP good, 3:31 (SHU 17–6)

Third quarter

- SHU – Nate Chavious, 12 yard run, Finney XP good, 5:26 (SHU 24–6)

Fourth quarter

- SHU – Tyler Dube, 80 yard pass from Noel, Finney XP good, 13:46 (SHU 31–6)

=== Brown ===
Brown vs. Cornell – Game summary

Quarter	1	2	3	4	Total
Brown	21	13	0	10	44
Cornell	3	7	7	7	24

at Schoellkopf Field

- Date: October 24
- Game time: 12:30 p.m. EDT
- Game weather: 48 °F (9 °C)
- Game attendance: 5,138
- Referee: Kartlon Derrick
- Box Score

Game information

First quarter

- BRWN – Alex Jette, 59 yard pass from Marcus Fuller, Grant Senne XP good, 14:24 (BRWN 7–0)
- BRWN – Johnny Pena, 1 yard run, Senne XP good, 6:26 (BRWN 14–0)
- BRWN – Pena, 1 yard run, Senne XP good, 5:57 (BRWN 21–0)
- COR – Joe Pierik, 27 yard field goal, 1:12 (BRWN 21–3)

Second quarter

- BRWN – Brian Strachan, 30 yard pass from Fuller, Senne XP good, 9:45 (BRWN 28–3)
- COR – Ben Rogers, 14 yard pass from Robert Somborn, Pierik XP good, 5:20 (BRWN 28–10)
- BRN – Pena, 1 yard run, Senne XP no good, 2:39 (BRWN 34–10)

Third quarter

- COR – Matt Sullivan, 4 yard pass from Somborn, Pierik XP good, 2:53 (BRWN 34–17)

Fourth quarter

- COR – Rogers, 49 yard pass from Somborn, Pierik XP good, 14:53 (BRWN 34–24)
- BRWN – Senne, 32 yard field goal, 8:20 (BRWN 37–24)
- BRWN – Pena, 1 yard run, Senne XP good, 2:49 (BRWN 44–24)

=== Princeton ===
Cornell vs. Princeton – Game summary

Quarter	1	2	3	4	Total
Cornell	0	7	7	7	21
Princeton	0	17	17	3	37

at Princeton Stadium

- Date: October 31
- Game time: 3:30 p.m. EDT
- Game weather: 54 °F (12 °C); "beautiful fall day"
- Game attendance: 4,528
- Referee: Chris Bloh
- TV: ASN
- Box Score

Game information

Second quarter

- PRIN – S Carpenter, 8 yard pass from Chad Kanoff, Nolan Bieck XP good, 14:01 (PRIN 7–0)
- PRIN – John Lovett, 3 yard run, Bieck XP good, 8:06 (PRIN 14–0)
- COR – Ben Rogers, 26 yard pass from Robert Somborn, Zach Mays XP good, 0:55 (PRIN 14–7)
- PRIN – Bieck, 34 yard field goal, 0:00 (PRIN 17–7)

Third quarter

- PRIN – Dre Nelson, 1 yard run, Bieck XP good, 13:08 (PRIN 24–7)
- COR – Luke Hagy, 1 yard run, Mays XP good, 9:59 (PRIN 24–14)
- PRIN – Lovett, 1 yard run, Bieck XP good, 5:34 (PRIN 31–14)
- PRIN – Bieck, 27 yard field goal, 1:48 (PRIN 34–14)

Fourth quarter

- COR – Chris Lenz, 6 yard pass from Somborn, Mays XP good, 13:44 (PRIN 34–21)
- PRIN – Dre Nelson, 100 yard kickoff return, conversion failed, 13:28 (PRIN 40–21)
- PRIN – Joe Rhattigan, 7 yard run, Bieck XP good, 9:19 (PRIN 47–21)

=== Dartmouth ===
Cornell vs. Dartmouth – Game summary

Quarter	1	2	3	4	Total
Cornell	3	0	0	0	3
Dartmouth	0	14	7	0	21

at Memorial Field

- Date: November 6
- Game time: 8:00 p.m. EST
- Game weather: 60 °F (16 °C); mild, overcast, dark
- Game attendance: 3,930
- Referee: Warren Gillis
- TV: NBCSN
- Box Score

Game information

First quarter

- COR – Zach Mays, 30 yard field goal, 1:50 (COR 3–0)

Second quarter

- DART – Ryder Stone, 2 yard run, A. Gakenheimer XP good, 9:55 (DART 7–3)
- DART – Ryan McManus, 8 yard pass from Dalyn Williams, Gakenheimer XP good, 0:19 (DART 14–3)

Third quarter

- DART – Williams, 4 yard run, Gakenheimer XP good, 3:21 (DART 21–3)

=== Columbia ===
Columbia vs. Cornell – Game summary

Quarter	1	2	3	4	Total
Columbia	0	0	0	0	0
Cornell	3	0	0	0	3

at Schoellkopf Field

- Date: November 14
- Game time: 12:30 p.m. EST
- Game weather: 39 °F (4 °C); mostly cloudy
- Game attendance: 3,233
- Referee: Matt Overton
- Box Score

Game information

First quarter

- COR – Zach Mays, 35 yard field goal, 5:55 (COR 3–0)

=== Penn ===
Cornell vs. Penn – Game summary

Quarter	1	2	3	4	Total
Cornell	0	7	7	7	21
Penn	20	7	7	0	34

at Franklin Field

- Date: November 21
- Game time: 1:00 p.m. EST
- Game weather: 52 °F (11 °C); sunny
- Game attendance: 6,007
- Referee: Jeff Gray
- Box Score

Game information

First quarter

- PENN – B. Schoenauer, 6 yard run, conversion failed, 12:36 (PENN 6–0)
- PENN – Ryan O'Malley, 14 yard pass from Eric Fiore, Jimmy Gammill XP good, 10:21 (PENN 13–0)
- PENN – Justin Watson, 37 yard pass from Alek Torgersen, Gammill XP good, 7:46 (PENN 20–0)

Second quarter

- COR – Robert Somborn, 1 yard run, Zach Mays XP good, 13:52 (PENN 20–7)
- PENN – Torgersen, 3 yard run, Gammill XP good, 12:08 (PENN 27–7)

Third quarter

- PENN – Watson, 12 yard pass from Togersen, Gammill XP good, 7:22 (PENN 34–7)
- COR – James Hubbard, 43 yard pass from Somborn, Mays XP good, 0:18 (PENN 34–14)

Fourth quarter

- COR – Luke Hagy, 7 yard pass from Somborn, Mays XP good, 1:11 (PENN 34–21)
