= 1988 Lehigh Engineers football team =

American college football season

1988 Lehigh Engineers football
- Conference: Colonial League
- Record: 6–5 (2–3 Colonial)
- Head coach: Hank Small (3rd season)
- Captains: Rich Curtis; Gregg Wolfson
- Home stadium: Goodman Stadium

1988 Colonial League football standings
| | Conf. | | | | | Overall |
| Team | W | | L | | T | W | | L | | T |
|---|---|---|---|---|---|---|---|---|---|---|
| Lafayette $ | 5 | – | 0 | – | 0 | 8 | – | 2 | – | 1 |
| No. 19 Holy Cross | 3 | – | 1 | – | 0 | 9 | – | 2 | – | 0 |
| Lehigh | 2 | – | 3 | – | 0 | 6 | – | 5 | – | 0 |
| Bucknell | 2 | – | 3 | – | 0 | 3 | – | 7 | – | 0 |
| Colgate | 2 | – | 3 | – | 0 | 2 | – | 9 | – | 0 |
| Davidson | 0 | – | 4 | – | 0 | 0 | – | 10 | – | 0 |
$ – Conference champion; Rankings from NCAA Division I-AA Football Committee poll

The 1988 Lehigh Engineers football team was an American football team that represented Lehigh University during the 1988 NCAA Division I-AA football season. Lehigh tied for third in the Colonial League.

In their third year under head coach Hank Small, the Engineers compiled a 6–5 record. Rich Curtis and Gregg Wolfson were the team captains.

The Engineers outscored opponents 351 to 300. Their 2–3 conference record placed Lehigh in a three-way tie for third (and for next-to-last) in the six-team Colonial League standings.

Lehigh played its first year of home games at Murray H. Goodman Stadium on the university's new Goodman Campus in Bethlehem, Pennsylvania.

== Schedule ==
| Date | Opponent | Site | Result | Attendance | Source |
|---|---|---|---|---|---|
| September 10 | at Davidson | Richardson Stadium; Davidson, NC | W 43–20 | 1,000 | |
| September 17 | at William & Mary* | Cary Field; Williamsburg, VA | L 6–14 | 5,842 | |
| September 24 | at Dartmouth* | Memorial Field; Hanover, NH | W 41–16 | 7,924 | |
| October 1 | Cornell* | Goodman Stadium; Bethlehem, PA | W 27–14 | 13,000 | |
| October 8 | Colgate | Goodman Stadium; Bethlehem, PA | W 24–19 | 11,400 | |
| October 15 | at Holy Cross | Fitton Field; Worcester, MA | L 24–48 | 16,441 | |
| October 22 | Towson State* | Goodman Stadium; Bethlehem, PA | W 27–22 | 6,000 | |
| October 29 | Columbia* | Goodman Stadium; Bethlehem, PA | W 56–27 | 7,250 | |
| November 5 | Bucknell | Goodman Stadium; Bethlehem, PA | L 32–35 | 8,523 | |
| November 12 | at Northeastern* | Parsons Field; Brookline, MA | L 26–33 | 3,512 | |
| November 19 | at Lafayette | Fisher Field; Easton, PA (The Rivalry) | L 45–52 | 17,500 | |
*Non-conference game
