= 2015 Harvard Crimson football team =

American college football season

2015 Harvard Crimson football

Ivy League co-champion Lambert Cup winner
- Conference: Ivy League

Ranking
- STATS: No. 20
- FCS Coaches: No. 20
- Record: 9–1 (6–1 Ivy)
- Head coach: Tim Murphy (22nd season)
- Offensive coordinator: Joel Lamb (10th season)
- Offensive scheme: Spread
- Defensive coordinator: Scott Larkee (7th season)
- Base defense: 4–3
- Home stadium: Harvard Stadium

2015 Ivy League football standings
	Conf.			Overall
Team	W		L	W		L
No. 20 Harvard +	6	–	1	9	–	1
No. 23 Dartmouth +	6	–	1	9	–	1
Penn +	6	–	1	7	–	3
Yale	3	–	4	6	–	4
Brown	3	–	4	5	–	5
Princeton	2	–	5	5	–	5
Columbia	1	–	6	2	–	8
Cornell	1	–	6	1	–	9
+ – Conference co-champions; Rankings from STATS Poll

The 2015 Harvard Crimson football team represented Harvard University during the 2015 NCAA Division I FCS football season. They were led by 22nd-year head coach Tim Murphy and played their home games at Harvard Stadium. They were a member of the Ivy League. They finished the season 9–1 overall 6–1 in Ivy League play to place in a three-way tie for the Ivy League title with Dartmouth and Penn. Harvard averaged 12,798 fans per game.

== Schedule ==
Date	Time	Opponent	Rank	Site	TV	Result	Attendance
September 19	1:00 p.m.	at Rhode Island*	No. 25	Meade Stadium; Kingston, RI		W 41–10	4,843
September 26	7:00 p.m.	Brown	No. 24	Harvard Stadium; Boston, MA	FCS	W 53–27	15,804
October 2	7:00 p.m.	Georgetown*	No. 24	Harvard Stadium; Boston, MA	ESPN3	W 45–0	7,566
October 10	12:00 p.m.	at Cornell	No. 24	Schoellkopf Field; Ithaca, NY	ASN	W 40–3	7,092
October 17	3:30 p.m.	at Lafayette*	No. 18	Fisher Stadium; Easton, PA	PLN	W 42–0	7,108
October 24	12:00 p.m.	Princeton	No. 15	Harvard Stadium; Boston, MA (rivalry)	ASN	W 42–7	17,444
October 30	7:30 p.m.	No. 22 Dartmouth	No. 15	Harvard Stadium; Boston, MA (rivalry)	NBCSN	W 14–13	13,058
November 7	1:00 p.m.	at Columbia	No. 13	Robert K. Kraft Field at Lawrence A. Wien Stadium; New York, NY		W 24–16	5,494
November 14	12:00 p.m.	Penn	No. 12	Harvard Stadium; Boston, MA (rivalry)	ASN	L 25–35	10,122
November 21	2:30 p.m.	at Yale	No. 19	Yale Bowl; New Haven, CT (rivalry)	NBCSN	W 38–19	52,126
*Non-conference game; Rankings from The Sports Network Poll released prior to the game; All times are in Eastern time

== Rankings ==
Ranking movements Legend: ██ Increase in ranking ██ Decrease in ranking RV = Received votes т = Tied with team above or below
	Week													
Poll	Pre	1	2	3	4	5	6	7	8	9	10	11	12	Final
STATS FCS	23	25	25	24	24	24	18	15	15	13	12	19	19	20
Coaches	22	25–T	RV	RV	25	24	18	15	16	15	13	21	19	20
