= 2015 Dartmouth Big Green football team =

American college football season

2015 Dartmouth Big Green football

Ivy League co-champion Lambert Cup winner
- Conference: Ivy League

Ranking
- STATS: No. 23
- FCS Coaches: No. 23
- Record: 9–1 (6–1 Ivy)
- Head coach: Buddy Teevens (16th season)
- Offensive coordinator: Keith Clark (6th season)
- Offensive scheme: Multiple
- Defensive coordinator: Don Dobes (6th season)
- Base defense: 4–3
- Home stadium: Memorial Field

2015 Ivy League football standings
	Conf.			Overall
Team	W		L	W		L
No. 20 Harvard +	6	–	1	9	–	1
No. 23 Dartmouth +	6	–	1	9	–	1
Penn +	6	–	1	7	–	3
Yale	3	–	4	6	–	4
Brown	3	–	4	5	–	5
Princeton	2	–	5	5	–	5
Columbia	1	–	6	2	–	8
Cornell	1	–	6	1	–	9
+ – Conference co-champions; Rankings from STATS Poll

The 2015 Dartmouth Big Green football team represented Dartmouth College in the 2015 NCAA Division I FCS football season. The Big Green were led by head coach Buddy Teevens in his 11th straight year and 16th overall. The played their home games at Memorial Field. They were a member of the Ivy League. They finished the season 9–1 overall and 6–1 in Ivy League play to place three-way tie for the Ivy League title with Harvard and Penn. Dartmouth averaged 6,660 fans per game.

== Schedule ==
Date	Time	Opponent	Rank	Site	TV	Result	Attendance
September 19	12:00 p.m.	at Georgetown*		Multi-Sport Field; Washington, DC	Campus Insiders	W 31–10	2,863
September 26	7:00 p.m.	Sacred Heart*		Memorial Field; Hanover, NH		W 49–7	7,363
October 3	3:30 p.m.	at Penn		Franklin Field; Philadelphia, PA		W 41–20	4,520
October 10	1:30 p.m.	Yale^{†}		Memorial Field; Hanover, NH	FCS	W 35–3	11,086
October 17	12:00 p.m.	at Central Connecticut*		Arute Field; New Britain, CT		W 34–7	2,064
October 24	3:00 p.m.	Columbia	No. 25	Memorial Field; Hanover, NH		W 13–9	4,713
October 30	7:30 p.m.	at No. 15 Harvard	No. 22	Harvard Stadium; Boston, MA (rivalry)	NBCSN	L 13–14	13,058
November 6	8:00 p.m.	Cornell	No. 24	Memorial Field; Hanover, NH (rivalry)	NBCSN	W 21–3	3,930
November 14	12:30 p.m.	at Brown	No. 23	Brown Stadium; Providence, RI		W 34–18	4,072
November 21	12:00 p.m.	Princeton	No. 21	Memorial Field; Hanover, NH	ASN	W 17–10	6,208
*Non-conference game; ^{†}Homecoming; Rankings from STATS Poll released prior to the game; All times are in Eastern time

== Rankings ==
Ranking movements Legend: ██ Increase in ranking ██ Decrease in ranking — = Not ranked RV = Received votes
	Week													
Poll	Pre	1	2	3	4	5	6	7	8	9	10	11	12	Final
STATS FCS	RV	RV	RV	RV	RV	RV	RV	25	22	24	23	21	20	23
Coaches	—	—	—	—	RV	RV	RV	RV	22	RV	24	23	22	23
