= 1988 Penn Quakers football team =

American college football season

1988 Penn Quakers football

Ivy League co-champion
- Conference: Ivy League
- Record: 9–1 (6–1 Ivy)
- Head coach: Ed Zubrow (3rd season)
- Offensive coordinator: Dick Maloney (3rd season)
- Captains: Dan Bauer; Tom Gizzi
- Home stadium: Franklin Field

1988 Ivy League football standings
	Conf.					Overall
Team	W		L		T	W		L		T
Penn +	6	–	1	–	0	9	–	1	–	0
Cornell +	6	–	1	–	0	7	–	2	–	1
Princeton	4	–	3	–	0	6	–	4	–	0
Dartmouth	4	–	3	–	0	5	–	5	–	0
Yale	3	–	3	–	1	3	–	6	–	1
Columbia	2	–	5	–	0	2	–	8	–	0
Harvard	2	–	5	–	0	2	–	8	–	0
Brown	0	–	6	–	1	0	–	9	–	1
+ – Conference co-champions

The 1988 Penn Quakers football team was an American football team that represented the University of Pennsylvania during the 1988 NCAA Division I-AA football season. Penn won a share of the Ivy League championship, its fifth of the past six years.

== Background ==
During its third and final year under head coach Ed Zubrow, the Quakers compiled a 9–1 record and outscored opponents 269 to 208. Dan Bauer and Tom Gizzi were the team captains.

Penn's 6–1 conference record tied with Cornell atop the Ivy League standings. The Quakers outscored Ivy opponents 182 to 75. Penn's only loss was to its co-champion, Cornell, in the last week of the year.

Before its last two games, Penn appeared in the weekly top 20 national rankings, at No. 19 in the poll released November 8 and at No. 14 in the poll of November 15.

Following the loss to Cornell, Penn dropped out of the rankings, and was not ranked at season's end.

Penn played its home games at Franklin Field adjacent to the university's campus in Philadelphia, Pennsylvania.

== Schedule ==
Date	Opponent	Site	Result	Attendance	Source
September 17	at Dartmouth	Memorial Field; Hanover, NH	W 33–27	7,917	
September 24	Bucknell*	Franklin Field; Philadelphia, PA	W 38–35	9,456	
October 1	Columbia	Franklin Field; Philadelphia, PA	W 24–10	11,640	
October 8	at Brown	Brown Stadium; Providence, RI	W 10–0	1,400	
October 15	Colgate*	Franklin Field; Philadelphia, PA	W 33–22	9,700	
October 22	Yale	Franklin Field; Philadelphia, PA	W 10–3	28,279	
October 29	at Princeton	Palmer Stadium; Princeton, NJ (rivalry)	W 31–23	24,500	
November 5	at No. 18 Lafayette*	Fisher Field; Easton, PA	W 31–17	3,500	
November 12	Harvard	Franklin Field; Philadelphia, PA (rivalry)	W 52–13	37,612	
November 19	at Cornell	Schoellkopf Field; Ithaca, NY (rivalry)	L 6–19	18,000	
*Non-conference game; Rankings from the latest NCAA Division I-AA poll released prior to the game
