= 1988 Lafayette Leopards football team =

American college football season

1988 Lafayette Leopards football

Colonial League champion
- Conference: Colonial League
- Record: 8–2–1 (5–0 Colonial)
- Head coach: Bill Russo (8th season)
- Defensive coordinator: Mike Donnelly (1st season)
- Captains: Chris LaPietra; Andy Nygren
- Home stadium: Fisher Field

1988 Colonial League football standings
	Conf.					Overall
Team	W		L		T	W		L		T
Lafayette $	5	–	0	–	0	8	–	2	–	1
No. 19 Holy Cross	3	–	1	–	0	9	–	2	–	0
Lehigh	2	–	3	–	0	6	–	5	–	0
Bucknell	2	–	3	–	0	3	–	7	–	0
Colgate	2	–	3	–	0	2	–	9	–	0
Davidson	0	–	4	–	0	0	–	10	–	0
$ – Conference champion; Rankings from NCAA Division I-AA Football Committee poll

The 1988 Lafayette Leopards football team was an American football team that represented Lafayette College during the 1988 NCAA Division I-AA football season. The Leopards swept the Colonial League to win their first conference championship.

In their eighth year under head coach Bill Russo, the Leopards compiled a 8–2–1 record. Chris LaPietra and Andy Nygren were the team captains.

The Leopards outscored opponents 420 to 251. Their undefeated (5–0) conference record placed first in the six-team Colonial League standings.

Unranked in the preseason poll, Lafayette soon climbed the ranks during a five-game winning streak, reaching as high as No. 5 in the weekly national Division I-AA rankings. Non-conference losses in the middle of the year led to the team dropping out of the top 20, and it finished the season unranked.

Lafayette played its home games at Fisher Field on College Hill in Easton, Pennsylvania.

== Schedule ==
Date	Opponent	Rank	Site	Result	Attendance	Source
September 10	Kutztown*		Fisher Field; Easton, PA	W 54–7		
September 17	No. 1 Holy Cross		Fisher Field; Easton, PA	W 28–20	6,200	
September 24	at Columbia*	No. 12	Wien Stadium; New York, NY	W 49–3	6,560	
October 1	at Colgate	No. 8	Andy Kerr Stadium; Hamilton, NY	W 42–35	6,200	
October 8	at Bucknell	No. 6	Memorial Stadium; Lewisburg, PA	W 52–35	9,820	
October 15	at Army*	No. 5	Michie Stadium; West Point, NY	L 17–24	40,570	
October 22	Mercyhurst*	No. 7	Fisher Field; Easton, PA	W 50–18		
October 29	Cornell*	No. 7	Fisher Field; Easton, PA	T 21–21	9,500	
November 5	Penn*	No. 18	Fisher Field; Easton, PA	L 17–31	3,500	
November 12	at Davidson		Richardson Stadium; Davidson, NC	W 38–13	600	
November 19	Lehigh		Fisher Field; Easton, PA (The Rivalry)	W 52–45	17,500	
*Non-conference game; Rankings from NCAA Division I-AA Football Committee Poll released prior to the game
