= 2015 Penn Quakers football team =

American college football season

2015 Penn Quakers football

Ivy League co-champion Lambert Cup winner
- Conference: Ivy League
- Record: 7–3 (6–1 Ivy)
- Head coach: Ray Priore (1st season)
- Offensive coordinator: John Reagan (1st season)
- Offensive scheme: Spread
- Defensive coordinator: Bob Benson (1st season)
- Base defense: 3–3–5
- Home stadium: Franklin Field

2015 Ivy League football standings
	Conf.			Overall
Team	W		L	W		L
No. 20 Harvard +	6	–	1	9	–	1
No. 23 Dartmouth +	6	–	1	9	–	1
Penn +	6	–	1	7	–	3
Yale	3	–	4	6	–	4
Brown	3	–	4	5	–	5
Princeton	2	–	5	5	–	5
Columbia	1	–	6	2	–	8
Cornell	1	–	6	1	–	9
+ – Conference co-champions; Rankings from STATS Poll

The 2015 Penn Quakers football team represented the University of Pennsylvania during the 2015 NCAA Division I FCS football season. They were led by first-year head coach Ray Priore and played their home games at Franklin Field. They were a member of the Ivy League. They finished the season 7–3 overall 6–1 in Ivy League play to place in a three-way tie for the Ivy League title with Dartmouth and Harvard. Penn averaged 6,048 fans per game.

== Schedule ==
Date	Time	Opponent	Site	TV	Result	Attendance
September 19	12:30 p.m.	at Lehigh*	Goodman Stadium; Bethlehem, PA		L 21–42	6,971
September 24	7:00 p.m.	at No. 5 Villanova*	Villanova Stadium; Villanova, PA	NNAA	W 24–13	5,727
October 3	3:30 p.m.	Dartmouth	Franklin Field; Philadelphia, PA		L 20–41	4,520
October 10	1:00 p.m.	No. 13 Fordham*	Franklin Field; Philadelphia, PA		L 45–48	2,847
October 17	3:30 p.m.	at Columbia	Robert K. Kraft Field at Lawrence A. Wien Stadium; New York, NY	ESPN3	W 42–7	12,098
October 23	7:00 p.m.	Yale	Franklin Field; Philadelphia, PA	NBCSN	W 34–20	5,849
October 31	12:30 p.m.	at Brown	Brown Stadium; Providence, RI		W 48–28	5,114
November 7	Noon	Princeton^{†}	Franklin Field; Philadelphia, PA (rivalry)	ASN	W 26–23 ^{OT}	11,017
November 14	Noon	at No. 12 Harvard	Harvard Stadium; Boston, MA (rivalry)	ASN	W 35–25	10,122
November 21	1:00 p.m.	Cornell	Franklin Field; Philadelphia, PA (rivalry)		W 34–21	6,007
*Non-conference game; ^{†}Homecoming; Rankings from STATS Poll released prior to the game; All times are in Eastern time
