= 1988 Holy Cross Crusaders football team =

American college football season

1988 Holy Cross Crusaders football

Lambert Cup winner
- Conference: Colonial League
- Record: 9–2 (3–1 Colonial)
- Head coach: Mark Duffner (3rd season)
- Defensive coordinator: Kevin Coyle (3rd season)
- Captains: Dennis Golden; Rob McGovern; Tom Smith; Jeff Wiley
- Home stadium: Fitton Field

1988 Colonial League football standings
	Conf.					Overall
Team	W		L		T	W		L		T
Lafayette $	5	–	0	–	0	8	–	2	–	1
No. 19 Holy Cross	3	–	1	–	0	9	–	2	–	0
Lehigh	2	–	3	–	0	6	–	5	–	0
Bucknell	2	–	3	–	0	3	–	7	–	0
Colgate	2	–	3	–	0	2	–	9	–	0
Davidson	0	–	4	–	0	0	–	10	–	0
$ – Conference champion; Rankings from NCAA Division I-AA Football Committee poll

The 1988 Holy Cross Crusaders football team was an American football team that represented the College of the Holy Cross during the 1988 NCAA Division I-AA football season. Holy Cross finished third in the Colonial League, its first non-championship year since league play began in 1986.

In their third year under head coach Mark Duffner, the Crusaders compiled a 9–2 record. Dennis Golden, Rob McGovern, Tom Smith and Jeff Wiley were the team captains.

The Crusaders outscored opponents 334 to 182. Their 3–1 conference record placed second in the six-team Colonial League standings.

The Crusaders were ranked No. 1 in the preseason national Division I-AA rankings, but a 1–2 start dropped them out of the top 20 in the first round of in-season rankings. They remained unranked as they compiled an eight-game win streak to finish the season, but were recognized as No. 19 in the final poll, released after their last game.

Holy Cross played its home games at Fitton Field on the college campus in Worcester, Massachusetts.

== Schedule ==
Date	Opponent	Rank	Site	Result	Attendance	Source
September 3	Rhode Island*	No. 1	Fitton Field; Worcester, MA	W 49–7	12,441	
September 10	at Army*	No. 1	Michie Stadium; West Point, NY	L 3–23	33,136	
September 17	at Lafayette	No. 1	Fisher Field; Easton, PA	L 20–28	6,200	
September 24	at Princeton*		Palmer Stadium; Princeton, NJ	W 30–26	10,200	
October 1	Harvard*		Fitton Field; Worcester, MA	W 35–20	12,441	
October 8	Dartmouth^{†}*		Fitton Field; Worcester, MA	W 17–3	850	
October 15	Lehigh^		Fitton Field; Worcester, MA	W 48–24	16,441	
October 22	at Brown*		Brown Stadium; Providence, RI	W 35–14	5,500	
October 29	at Colgate		Andy Kerr Stadium; Hamilton, NY	W 7–0	4,500	
November 12	Bucknell		Fitton Field; Worcester, MA	W 38–7	9,111	
November 19	Northeastern*		Fitton Field; Worcester, MA	W 52–30	7,881	
*Non-conference game; ^{†}Homecoming; ^ Family Weekend; Rankings from NCAA Division I-AA Football Committee Poll released prior to the game
