= 1988 Brown Bears football team =

American college football season

1988 Brown Bears football
- Conference: Ivy League
- Record: 0–9–1 (0–6–1 Ivy)
- Head coach: John Rosenberg (5th season)
- Offensive coordinator: Tony Marciano (1st season)
- Defensive coordinator: Lou Ferrari (2nd season)
- Captains: Greg Kylish; George Pyne; L. Wood
- Home stadium: Brown Stadium

1988 Ivy League football standings
	Conf.					Overall
Team	W		L		T	W		L		T
Penn +	6	–	1	–	0	9	–	1	–	0
Cornell +	6	–	1	–	0	7	–	2	–	1
Princeton	4	–	3	–	0	6	–	4	–	0
Dartmouth	4	–	3	–	0	5	–	5	–	0
Yale	3	–	3	–	1	3	–	6	–	1
Columbia	2	–	5	–	0	2	–	8	–	0
Harvard	2	–	5	–	0	2	–	8	–	0
Brown	0	–	6	–	1	0	–	9	–	1
+ – Conference co-champions

The 1988 Brown Bears football team was an American football team that represented Brown University during the 1988 NCAA Division I-AA football season. Brown went winless and finished last in the Ivy League.

In their fifth season under head coach John Rosenberg, the Bears compiled an 0–9–1 record and were outscored 285 to 125. Greg Kylish, George Pyne and L. Wood were the team captains.

The Bears' 0–6–1 conference record placed last in the Ivy League standings. They were outscored 196 to 91 by Ivy opponents.

Brown played its home games at Brown Stadium in Providence, Rhode Island.

== Schedule ==
Date	Opponent	Site	Result	Attendance	Source
September 17	Yale	Brown Stadium; Providence, RI	T 24–24	15,017	
September 24	at Rhode Island*	Meade Stadium; Kingston, RI	L 10–17	7,455	
October 1	at Princeton	Palmer Stadium; Princeton, NJ	L 27–31	10,800	
October 8	Penn	Brown Stadium; Providence, RI	L 0–10	1,400	
October 15	at Cornell	Schoellkopf Field; Ithaca, NY	L 0–35	11,000	
October 22	Holy Cross*	Brown Stadium; Providence, RI	L 14–35	5,500	
October 29	at Harvard	Harvard Stadium; Boston, MA	L 3–28	14,900	
November 5	Maine*	Brown Stadium; Providence, RI	L 10–37	1,600	
November 12	Dartmouth	Brown Stadium; Providence, RI	L 24–37	7,300	
November 19	at Columbia	Wien Stadium; New York, NY	L 13–31	5,565	
*Non-conference game
