= 2015 Yale Bulldogs football team =

American college football season

2015 Yale Bulldogs football
- Conference: Ivy League
- Record: 6–4 (3–4 Ivy)
- Head coach: Tony Reno (4th season)
- Offensive coordinator: Joe Conlin (2nd season)
- Offensive scheme: Spread
- Defensive coordinator: Rick Flanders (4th season)
- Base defense: 4–3
- Home stadium: Yale Bowl

2015 Ivy League football standings
	Conf.			Overall
Team	W		L	W		L
No. 20 Harvard +	6	–	1	9	–	1
No. 23 Dartmouth +	6	–	1	9	–	1
Penn +	6	–	1	7	–	3
Yale	3	–	4	6	–	4
Brown	3	–	4	5	–	5
Princeton	2	–	5	5	–	5
Columbia	1	–	6	2	–	8
Cornell	1	–	6	1	–	9
+ – Conference co-champions; Rankings from STATS Poll

The 2015 Yale Bulldogs football team represented Yale University in the 2015 NCAA Division I FCS football season. This season marked the Bulldogs's 143rd overall season and the team played its home games at Yale Bowl in New Haven, Connecticut. They were led by fourth year head coach Tony Reno. They were a member of the Ivy League. They finished the season 6–4 overall and 3–4 in Ivy League play to tie for fourth place. Yale averaged 20,614 fans per game.

== Previous season and offseason ==
The 2014 Yale Bulldogs finished the regular season 8–2, 5–2 Ivy, with their two losses to Dartmouth and Harvard. The Bulldogs came one win shy of winning a share of the Ivy League Championship. The team had the #1 Total Offense in the FCS (571.5 YPG) and the #1 3rd Down Conversion Percentage (0.517 Pct) at the end of the 2014 season.

=== Departures ===
Notable departures from the 2014 squad included seniors, Tyler Varga, who declared his eligibility for the 2015 NFL draft, and Deon Randall.

Name	Number	Pos.	Height	Weight	Year	Hometown	Notes
Deon Randall	2	Wide receiver	5'8"	195	Senior	San Diego, CA	Graduated
Charles Cook	22	Outside linebacker	6'3"	220	Senior	Dallas, TX	Graduated
L.J. Hunt	22	Tail back	5'11"	210	Senior	Stratford, CT	Graduated
Kahill Keyes	24	Tail back	5'11"	213	Senior	Petaluma, CA	Graduated
Grant Wallace	29	Wide receiver	5'11"	195	Senior	St. Louis, MO	Graduated
Tyler Varga	30	Tail back	5'11"	224	Senior	Kitchener, ON	Declared for the 2015 NFL Draft
Nick LaTesta	33	Wide receiver	5'8"	174	Senior	Wood Ridge, NJ	Graduated
Everett Johnson	36	Tail back	5'9"	199	Senior	Union, NJ	Graduated
Kyle Cazzetta	37	Kicker	5'11"	210	Senior	Slate Hill, NY	Graduated
William Vaughan	42	Linebacker	6'0"	235	Senior	South Orange, NJ	Graduated
Parker Toms	48	Punter	5'11"	201	Senior	San Carlos, CA	Graduated
Jeff Schmittgens	53	Defensive end	6'3"	241	Senior	Naperville, IL	Graduated
Tyler Manu	55	Defensive end	6'1"	235	Senior	Meridian, ID	Graduated
Ryan Stanney	59	Linebacker	6'0"	212	Senior	Oviedo, FL	Graduated
William Chism	67	Offensive lineman	6'3"	302	Senior	Ridgeland, MS	Graduated
Stephen Shoemaker	69	Offensive lineman	6'0"	264	Senior	Bronxville, NY	Graduated
Ben Carbery	70	Offensive lineman	6'5"	300	Senior	Oak Park, IL	Graduated
John Duion	76	Offensive lineman	6'3"	276	Senior	Santa Barbara, CA	Graduated
Adam Conklin	86	Defensive end	6'3"	248	Senior	Dover, MA	Graduated
Davis Frank	98	Defensive tackle	6'3"	265	Senior	Clinton, TN	Graduated

=== Spring game ===
2015 Yale Blue-White Game

Team	1	2	Total
White (Defense)	23	23	46
• Blue (Offense)	24	24	48

- Location: New Haven, Connecticut
- Game start: 1:00 p.m.

Yale held their annual Blue-White Spring Game on April 18, 2015.

Awards

- Offensive Big Award: Beau Iverson, OT, So
- Defensive Big Award: Marty Moesta, DE, So.
- Offensive Big Skill Award: Stephen Buric, TE, Jr.
- Defensive Big Skill Award: Austin Carter, LB, Jr.
- Offensive Skill Award: Chris Williams-Lopez, WR, Fr.
- Defensive Skill Award: Dale Harris, CB, So.
- Offensive Strength & Conditioning MVP: Candler Rich, RB, So.
- Defensive Strength & Conditioning MVP: Victor Egu, LB, So.
- Offensive Strength & Conditioning MIP: Logan Scott, QB, Jr.
- Defensive Strength & Conditioning MIP: Will Bryan, DB, Fr.
- One Team Award: Roger Kilgore III, Safety, Jr. & Robert Clemons III, WR, So.
- Every Play Every Day Award: Austin Reuland, RB, Jr.

== Personnel ==
=== Coaching staff ===
Name	Position	Consecutive season at Yale in current position
Tony Reno	Head coach	4th
Joe Conlin	Offensive coordinator, Offensive line	4th
Steve Vashel	Defensive coordinator, Secondary	4th
Sean McGowan	co-Defensive coordinator, Linebackers	1st
Kevin Cahill	Quarterbacks	4th
Art Asselta	Wide receivers	2nd
Paul Rice '10	Special Teams, Outside Linebackers	3rd
Jordan Stevens	Defensive line	1st
Chandler Henley '06	Assistant head coach, Tight Ends	1st
Derrick Lett	Assistant head coach, Running Backs	1st
Reference:2015 Quick Facts

== Schedule ==
Date	Time	Opponent	Site	TV	Result	Attendance
September 19	1:00 p.m.	at Colgate*	Crown Field at Andy Kerr Stadium; Hamilton, NY	TWCS	W 29–28	7,343
September 26	1:00 p.m.	Cornell	Yale Bowl; New Haven, CT	ILDN	W 33–26	15,926
October 3	12:30 p.m.	at Lehigh*	Goodman Stadium; Bethlehem, PA	SECTV2	W 27–12	5,472
October 10	1:30 p.m.	at Dartmouth	Memorial Stadium; Hanover, NH	FCS	L 3–35	11,086
October 17	3:30 p.m.	at Maine*	Alfond Stadium; Orono, ME	WVII/WPME/FCS	W 21–10	7,351
October 23	7:00 p.m.	at Penn	Franklin Field; Philadelphia, PA	NBCSN	L 20–34	5,849
October 31	12:30 p.m.	Columbia	Yale Bowl; New Haven, CT	FCS	L 7–17	7,259
November 7	12:30 p.m.	Brown	Yale Bowl; New Haven, CT	FCS	W 41–14	6,878
November 14	1:00 p.m.	at Princeton	Powers Field at Princeton Stadium; Princeton, NJ (rivalry)		W 35–28	11,623
November 21	2:30 p.m.	No. 19 Harvard	Yale Bowl; New Haven, CT (rivalry)	NBCSN	L 19–38	52,126
*Non-conference game; Rankings from STATS Poll released prior to the game; All times are in Eastern time

=== Game summaries ===
==== @ Colgate Raiders ====
Yale Bulldogs at Colgate Raiders – Game summary

Quarter	1	2	3	4	Total
Yale	7	0	7	15	29
Colgate	7	14	0	7	28

at Andy Kerr Stadium • Hamilton, NY

- Date: September 19, 2015
- Game time: 1:00 p.m.
- Game weather: 80, Mostly Sunny, Wind SSW 13 mph
- Game attendance: 7,343
- Referee: Karlton Derrick
- TV: TWCS
- Sources: Box Score

Game information

First Quarter

- YALE – Rich 1–yard run (Holmes kick), 10:03 (YALE 7–0)
- COLGATE – Wilkins 2–yard run (Bowman kick), 4:49 (TIED 7–7)

Second Quarter

- COLGATE – Melville 20–yard run (Bowman kick), 6:26 (COLGATE 14–7)
- COLGATE – Buttermore 55–yard fumble return (Bowman kick), 3:02 (COLGATE 21–7)

Third Quarter

- YALE – Siragusa Jr. 4–yard pass from Roberts (Holmes kick), 2:48 (COLGATE 21–14)

Fourth Quarter

- COLGATE – Holland 12–yard run (Bowman kick), 10:05 (COLGATE 28–14)
- YALE – Clemons III 30–yard pass from Roberts (2–point conversion run by Oplinger), 7:19 (COLGATE 28–22)
- YALE – Siragusa Jr. 13–yard pass from Roberts (Holmes kick), 3:39 (YALE 29–28)

Passing

- YALE - Roberts, 29 completions, 41 attempts, 293 yards, 3 touchdowns, 1 interception
- COLGATE - Melville, 11 completions, 21 attempts, 140 yards

Rushing

- YALE - Rich, 22 carries, 78 yards, 1 touchdown
- COLGATE - Wilkins, 28 carries, 94 yards, 1 touchdown

Receiving

- YALE - Siragusa Jr., 7 catches, 82 yards, 2 touchdown
- COLGATE - Quazza, 4 catches, 56 yards

Defense

- YALE - Egu, 13 tackles
- COLGATE - Diener, 13 tackles

==== Vs. Cornell Big Red ====
Cornell Big Red at Yale Bulldogs – Game summary

Quarter	1	2	3	4	Total
Cornell	6	20	0	0	26
Yale	0	13	3	17	33

at Yale Bowl • New Haven, CT

- Date: September 26, 2015
- Game time: 1:00 p.m.
- Game weather: 66, Partly Sunny, Wind ENE 8 mph
- Game attendance: 15,926
- Referee: Matt Overton
- TV: ILDN
- Sources: Box Score

Game information

First Quarter

- CORNELL – Gallo 7–yard pass from Somborn (Mays kick failed), 9:25 (CORNELL 6–0)

Second Quarter

- CORNELL – Hagy 2–yard run (Mays kick blocked), 14:57 (CORNELL 12–0)
- YALE – Roberts 7–yard run (Holmes kick), 12:21 (CORNELL 12–7)
- CORNELL – Shaw 37–yard pass from Somborn (Mays kick), 9:59 (CORNELL 19–7)
- CORNELL – Shaw 13–yard pass from Somborn (Mays kick), 0:47 (CORNELL 26–7)
- YALE – Drwal 6–yard pass from Roberts (Holmes kick blocked), 0:32 (CORNELL 26–13)

Third Quarter

- YALE – Holmes 26–yard field goal, 11:19 (CORNELL 26–16)

Fourth Quarter

- YALE – Holmes 37–yard field goal, 11:09 (CORNELL 26–19)
- YALE – Clemons III 8–yard pass from Roberts (Holmes kick is good), 1:12 (TIED 26–26)
- YALE – Little 52–yard pass from Roberts (Holmes kick is good), 0:32 (YALE 33–26)

Passing

- CORNELL – Somborn, 20 completions, 30 attempts, 238 yards, 3 touchdowns, 1 interception
- YALE – Roberts, 25 completions, 47 attempts, 371 yards, 3 touchdowns

Rushing

- CORNELL – Hagy, 23 carries, 117 yards, 1 touchdown
- YALE – Rich, 9 carries, 44 yards

Receiving

- CORNELL – Shaw, 7 catches, 114 yards, 2 touchdown
- YALE – Little, 4 catches, 100 yards, 1 touchdown

Defense

- CORNELL – Gesualdi, 10 tackles
- YALE – Carlson, 10 tackles

==== @ Lehigh Mountain Hawks (Yank Townsend Trophy) ====
Yale Bulldogs at Lehigh Mountain Hawks – Game summary

Quarter	1	2	3	4	Total
Yale	10	3	8	6	27
Lehigh	0	0	7	5	12

at Goodman Stadium • Bethlehem, PA

- Date: October 3, 2015
- Game time: 12:30 p.m.
- Game weather: 48, Rain & Wind, Wind ENE 12 mph
- Game attendance: 5,472
- Referee: Mike Sechrist
- TV: SECTV2
- Sources: Box Score

Game information

First Quarter

- YALE – Salter 2–yard run (Holmes kick), 11:33 (YALE 7–0)
- YALE – Holmes 44–yard field goal, 5:50 (YALE 10–0)

Second Quarter

- YALE – Holmes 20–yard field goal, 7:24 (YALE 13–0)

Third Quarter

- LEHIGH – Shafnisky, Nick 24–yard run (Mish kick), 12:00 (YALE 13–7)
- YALE – Team safety, 9:30 (YALE 15–7)
- YALE – Salter 42–yard run (2–point conversion rush by Oplinger failed), 3:34 (YALE 21–7)

Fourth Quarter

- YALE – Drwal 5–yard pass from Roberts (2–point conversion pass by Scott intercepted), 14:19 (YALE 27–7)
- LEHIGH – Ripanti 98–yard extra point return, 14:19 (YALE 27–9)
- LEHIGH – Mish 27–yard field goal, 5:51 (YALE 27–12)

Top Passers

- YALE – Roberts, 25 completions, 42 attempts, 251 yards, 1 touchdown, 1 interception
- LEHIGH – Shafnisky, 26 completions, 47 attempts, 211 yards, 1 interception

Top Rushers

- YALE – Salter, 29 carries, 233 yards, 2 touchdowns
- LEHIGH – Shafnisky, 20 carries, 79 yards, 1 touchdown

Top Receiving

- YALE – Drwal, 5 catches, 57 yards, 1 touchdown
- LEHIGH – Pelletier, 10 catches, 104 yards

Defense

- YALE – Oplinger, 11 tackles
- LEHIGH – Githens, 12 tackles

==== @ Dartmouth Big Green ====
Yale Bulldogs at Dartmouth Big Green – Game summary

Quarter	1	2	3	4	Total
Yale	0	3	0	0	3
Dartmouth	7	14	7	7	35

at Memorial Field • Hanover, NH

- Date: October 10, 2015
- Game time: 1:30 p.m.
- Game weather: 54, Sunny, Slight wind
- Game attendance: 11,086
- Referee: Jeff Gray
- TV: FCS
- Sources: Box Score

Game information

First Quarter

- DARTMOUTH – Skaff 8–yard pass from Williams (Gakenheimer kick), 0:29 (DARTMOUTH 7–0)

Second Quarter

- DARTMOUTH – Grove 4–yard run (Gakenheimer kick), 11:35 (DARTMOUTH 14–0)
- DARTMOUTH – Bramble 17–yard pass from Williams (Gakenheimer kick), 6:28 (DARTMOUTH 21–0)
- YALE – Holmes 35–yard field goal, 0:03 (DARTMOUTH 21–3)

Third Quarter

- DARTMOUTH – Skaff 4–yard pass from Williams (Gakenheimer kick), 7:37 (DARTMOUTH 28–3)

Fourth Quarter

- DARTMOUTH – Brown 36–yard pass from Williams (Gakenheimer kick), 2:39 (DARTMOUTH 35–3)

Top Passers

- YALE – Roberts, 29 completions, 58 attempts, 229 yards, 3 interceptions
- DARTMOUTH – Williams, 29 completions, 53 attempts, 435 yards, 4 touchdowns

Top Rushers

- YALE – Salter, 19 carries, 45 yards
- DARTMOUTH – Bramble, 8 carries, 85 yards

Top Receiving

- YALE – Siragusa Jr., 12 catches, 132 yards
- DARTMOUTH – McManus, 6 catches, 116 yards

Defense

- YALE – Egu, 9 tackles, 1.5 sacks for 8 yards
- DARTMOUTH – Caldwell, 7 tackles, 2 interceptions for 7 yards, 3 breakups

==== @ Maine Black Bears ====
Yale Bulldogs at Maine Black Bears – Game summary

Quarter	1	2	3	4	Total
Yale	0	3	6	12	21
Maine	0	7	3	0	10

at Alfond Stadium • Orono, ME

- Date: October 17, 2015
- Game time: 3:30 p.m.
- Game weather: 50s, Overcast and cool, Calm Wind
- Game attendance: 7,351
- Referee: Charles Jebran
- TV: FCS
- Sources: Box Score

Game information

First Quarter

- NO SCORING

Second Quarter

- MAINE – Beckford 1–yard run (Decloux kick), 8:22 (MAINE 7–0)
- YALE – Holmes 22–yard field goal, 0:09 (MAINE 7–3)

Third Quarter

- YALE – Salter 1–yard run (Holmes kick failed), 6:02 (YALE 9–7)
- MAINE – Decloux 35–yard field goal, 0:36 (MAINE 10–9)

Fourth Quarter

- YALE – Salter 17–yard run (2–point conversion pass by Roberts failed), 13:31 (YALE 15–10)
- YALE – Roberts 26–yard run (Holmes kick failed), 4:07 (YALE 21–10)

Top Passers

- YALE – Roberts, 14 completions, 33 attempts, 185 yards, 1 interception
- MAINE – Collins, 19 completions, 49 attempts, 199 yards, 2 interceptions

Top Rushers

- YALE – Salter, 37 carries, 139 yards, 2 touchdowns
- MAINE – Beckford, 25 carries, 78 yards, 1 touchdown

Top Receiving

- YALE – Siragusa Jr., 4 receptions, 98 yards
- MAINE – Dunn, 6 receptions, 72 yards

Defense

- YALE – Rymiszewski, 9 tackles, 1 interception for 3 yards
- MAINE – Samuels, 15 tackles, 2 tackle–for–losses for 5 yards

==== @ Penn Quakers ====
Yale Bulldogs at Penn Quakers – Game summary

Quarter	1	2	3	4	Total
Yale	10	3	7	0	20
Penn	0	20	7	7	34

at Franklin Field • Philadelphia, PA

- Date: October 23, 2015
- Game time: 7:00 p.m.
- Game weather: 57, Clear, Wind NNE 9 mph
- Game attendance: 5,849
- Referee: Kelvin Hudson
- TV: NBCSN
- Sources: Box Score

Game information

First Quarter

- YALE – Holmes 39–yard field goal, 9:08 (YALE 3–0)
- YALE – Clemons III 17–yard pass from Roberts (Holmes kick), 5:12 (YALE 10–0)

Second Quarter

- PENN – Pearson 63–yard pass from Torgersen (Gammill kick), 13:38 (YALE 10–7)
- PENN – Solomon 17–yard pass from Torgersen (2–point conversion rush by Stapleton failed), 12:57 (PENN 13–10)
- YALE – Holmes 26–yard field goal, 3:22 (TIED 13–13)
- PENN – O'Malley 1–yard pass from Torgersen (Gammill kick), 0:11 (PENN 20–13)

Third Quarter

- PENN – Pearson 27–yard pass from Torgersen (Gammill kick), 5:19 (PENN 27–13)
- YALE – Reuland 6–yard run (Holmes kick), 0:07 (PENN 27–20)

Fourth Quarter

- PENN – Solomon 28–yard run (Gammill kick), 8:13 (PENN 34–20)

Top Passers

- YALE – Roberts, 25 completions, 46 attempts, 318 yards, 1 touchdown, 3 interceptions
- PENN – Togerson, 25 completions, 35 attempts, 350 yards, 4 touchdowns

Top Rushers

- YALE – Reuland, 12 carries, 61 yards, 1 touchdown
- PENN – Solomon, 18 carries, 120 yards, 1 touchdown

Top Receiving

- YALE – Clemons III, 6 receptions, 99 yards, 1 touchdown
- PENN – Pearson, 6 receptions, 133 yards, 2 touchdowns

Defense

- YALE – Carlson, 10 tackles
- PENN – Philippi, 12 tackles

==== Vs. Columbia Lions ====
Columbia Lions at Yale Bulldogs – Game summary

Quarter	1	2	3	4	Total
Columbia	0	7	3	7	17
Yale	7	0	0	0	7

at Yale Bowl • New Haven, CT

- Date: October 31, 2015
- Game time: 12:30 p.m.
- Game weather: 50, Sunny/Cool, Wind SE 6 mph
- Game attendance: 7,259
- Referee: Hank Johns
- TV: FCS
- Sources: Box Score

Game information

First Quarter

- YALE – Alessi 80–yard punt return (Holmes kick), 9:25 (YALE 7–0)

Second Quarter

- COLUMBIA – Trumbull 7–yard pass from Mornhinweg (Nizialek kick), 5:30 (TIED 7–7)

Third Quarter

- COLUMBIA – Nizialek 40–yard field goal, 9:38 (COLUMBIA 10–7)

Fourth Quarter

- COLUMBIA – Nizialek 13–yard run (Nizialek kick),13:28 (COLUMBIA 17–7)

Top Passers

- CU – Mornhinweg, 11 completions, 22 attempts, 82 yards, 1 touchdown, 1 interception
- YALE – Roberts, 12 completions, 24 attempts, 104 yards, 1 interception

Top Rushers

- CU – Molina, 23 carries, 76 yards
- YALE – Reuland, 7 carries, 19 yards

Top Receiving

- CU – Hollis, 5 receptions, 31 yards
- YALE – Clemens III, 4 receptions, 56 yards

Defense

- CU – Brady, 8 tackles
- YALE – Carlson, 12 tackles

==== Vs. Brown Bears ====
Brown Bears at Yale Bulldogs – Game summary

Quarter	1	2	3	4	Total
Brown	7	7	0	0	14
Yale	14	3	24	0	41

at Yale Bowl • New Haven, CT

- Date: November 7, 2015
- Game time: 12:30 p.m.
- Game weather: 62, Overcast, Wind NW 7 mph
- Game attendance: 6,878
- Referee: Jeff Pumphrey
- TV: FCS
- Sources: Box Score

Game information

First Quarter

- YALE – Salter 2–yard run (Holmes kick), 13:40 (YALE 7–0)
- BROWN – Doles 21–yard pass from Fuller (Senne kick), 10:13 (TIED 7–7)
- YALE – Salter 11–yard run (Holmes kick), 6:44 (YALE 14–7)

Second Quarter

- BROWN – Doles 2–yard run (Grant Senne kick), 11:41 (TIED 14–14)
- YALE – Holmes 27–yard field goal, 0:01 (YALE 17–14)

Third Quarter

- YALE – Holmes 20–yard field goal, 10:24 (YALE 20–14)
- YALE – Salter 1–yard run (Holmes kick), 4:24 (YALE 27–14)
- YALE – Harris 3–yard run (Holmes kick), 1:13 (YALE 34–14)
- YALE – Rymiszewski 24–yard interception return (Holmes kick), 1:02 (YALE 41–14)

Fourth Quarter

- NO SCORING

Top Passers

- BROWN – Fuller, 16 completions, 32 attempts, 165 yards, 1 touchdown, 1 interception
- YALE – Roberts, 28 completions, 41 attempts, 267 yards

Top Rushers

- BROWN – Rosenbauer, 10 carries, 36 yards
- YALE – Harris, 12 carries, 7 yards, 1 touchdown

Top Receiving

- BROWN – Doles, 8 receptions, 102 yards, 1 touchdown
- YALE – Williams–Lopez, 13 receptions, 154 yards

Defense

- BROWN – Quigley, 9 tackles
- YALE – Carlson, 10 tackles

==== @ Princeton Tigers ====
Yale Bulldogs at Princeton Tigers – Game summary

Quarter	1	2	3	4	Total
Yale	7	14	3	11	35
Princeton	14	7	7	0	28

at Powers Field at Princeton Stadium • Princeton, NJ

- Date: November 14, 2015
- Game time: 1:00 p.m.
- Game weather: 49, Clear/windy, Wind NW 17 mph
- Game attendance: 11,623
- Referee: Warren Gillis
- Sources: Box Score

Game information

First Quarter

- PRINCETON – Osborne 7–yard pass from Kanoff (Bieck kick), 9:15 (PRINCETON 7–0)
- PRINCETON – Atwater 4–yard run (Bieck kick), 1:49 (PRINCETON 14–0)
- YALE – Harris 71–yard run (Holmes kick), 0:34 (PRINCETON 14–7)

Second Quarter

- YALE – Haenni 22–yard pass from Scott (Holmes kick), 9:20 (TIED 14–14)
- PRINCETON – Barnes 18–yard pass from Kanoff (Bieck kick), 6:33 (PRINCETON 21–14)
- YALE – Roberts 1–yard run (Holmes kick), 1:55 (TIED 21–21)

Third Quarter

- YALE – Holmes 35–yard field goal, 3:43 (YALE 24–21)
- PRINCETON – Barnes 53–yard pass from Kanoff (Bieck kick), 2:21 (PRINCETON 28–24)

Fourth Quarter

- YALE – Holmes 34–yard field goal, 12:58 (PRINCETON 28–27)
- YALE – Clemons 19–yard pass from Roberts (2–point conversion pass by Stallings), 4:31 (YALE 35–28)

Top Passers

- YALE – Roberts, 20 completions, 29 attempts, 185 yards, 1 touchdown
- PRINCETON – Kanoff, 25 completions, 42 attempts, 338 yards, 3 touchdowns, 2 interceptions

Top Rushers

- YALE – Harris, 30 carries, 177 yards, 1 touchdown
- PRINCETON – Atwater, 12 carries, 52 yards, 1 touchdown

Top Receiving

- YALE – Williams–Lopez, 10 receptions, 69 yards
- PRINCETON – Barnes, 6 receptions, 151 yards, 2 touchdowns

Defense

- YALE – Carlson, 10 tackles
- PRINCETON – Williams, 15 tackles

==== Vs. Harvard Crimson ====
Harvard Crimson at Yale Bulldogs – Game summary

Quarter	1	2	3	4	Total
#19 Harvard	7	14	10	7	38
Yale	7	0	0	12	19

at Yale Bowl • New Haven, CT

- Date: November 21, 2015
- Game time: 2:30 p.m.
- Game weather: 41, Clear Skies/cool, Light wind
- Game attendance: 52,126
- Referee: Charles Jebran
- TV: NBCSN
- Sources: Box Score

Game information

First Quarter

- YALE – Williams–Lopez 28–yard pass from Roberts (Holmes kick), 11:24 (YALE 7–0)
- HARVARD – Shelton–Mosley 53–yard pass from Hosch (Smart kick), 10:31 (TIED 7–7)

Second Quarter

- HARVARD – Shelton–Mosley 35–yard pass from Hosch, Scott (Smart kick), 11:24 (HARVARD 14–7)
- HARVARD – Braunecker 18–yard pass from Hosch (Smart kick), 2:27 (HARVARD 21–7)

Third Quarter

- HARVARD – Braunecker 2–yard pass from Hosch (Smart kick), 8:33 (HARVARD 28–7)
- HARVARD – Smart 39–yard field goal, 3:48 (HARVARD 31–7)

Fourth Quarter

- YALE – Roberts 1–yard run (2–point conversion pass by Roberts failed), 14:11 (HARVARD 31–13)
- HARVARD – Shelton–Mosley 8–yard run (Smart kick), 5:25 (HARVARD 38–13)
- YALE – Buric 8–yard pass from Roberts. (2–point conversion pass by Roberts failed), 3:26 (HARVARD 38–19)

Top Passers

- HARVARD – Hosch, 23 completions, 37 attempts, 320 yards, 4 touchdowns, 1 interceptions
- YALE – Roberts, 38 completions, 65 attempts, 410 yards, 2 touchdowns

Top Rushers

- HARVARD – Hosch, 11 carries, 60 yards
- YALE – Harris, 10 carries, 31 yards

Top Receiving

- HARVARD – Shelton–Mosley, 5 receptions, 119 yards, 2 touchdowns
- YALE – Williams–Lopez, 13 receptions, 169 yards, 1 touchdown

Defense

- HARVARD – Lindsey, 11 tackles
- YALE – Champion, 12 tackles

== Awards ==
=== Preseason All-Ivy Team ===
First-Team Offense

- OL, Luke Longinotti

First-Team Defense

- DB, Foyesade Oluokun

Second-Team Offense

- QB, Morgan Roberts
- WR, Bo Hines
- OL, Khalid Cannon

Second-Team Defense

- DL, Copache Tyler
- DB, Cole Champion

Third-Team Offense

- RB, Candler Rich
- WR, Robert Clemons
- TE, Leo Haenni
- OL, Mason Friedline
- KR, Jamal Locke

Third-Team Defense

- DL, Earl Chism
- DB, Dale Harris
