= 1988 Davidson Wildcats football team =

American college football season

1988 Davidson Wildcats football
- Conference: Colonial League
- Record: 0–10 (0–4 Colonial)
- Head coach: Vic Gatto (4th season)
- Home stadium: Richardson Stadium

1988 Colonial League football standings
	Conf.					Overall
Team	W		L		T	W		L		T
Lafayette $	5	–	0	–	0	8	–	2	–	1
No. 19 Holy Cross	3	–	1	–	0	9	–	2	–	0
Lehigh	2	–	3	–	0	6	–	5	–	0
Bucknell	2	–	3	–	0	3	–	7	–	0
Colgate	2	–	3	–	0	2	–	9	–	0
Davidson	0	–	4	–	0	0	–	10	–	0
$ – Conference champion; Rankings from NCAA Division I-AA Football Committee poll

The 1988 Davidson Wildcats football team represented Davidson College as a member of the Colonial League during the 1988 NCAA Division I-AA football season. Led by fourth-year head coach Vic Gatto, the Wildcats compiled an overall record of 0–10 with a mark of 0–4 in conference play, placing last out of six teams in the Colonial.

== Schedule ==
Date	Opponent	Site	Result	Attendance	Source
September 3	Presbyterian*	Richardson Stadium; Davidson, NC	L 16–34	1,500	
September 10	Lehigh	Richardson Stadium; Davidson, NC	L 20–43	1,000	
September 24	at Fordham*	Coffey Field; Bronx, NY	L 3–9	3,265	
October 1	Dartmouth*	Richardson Stadium; Davidson, NC	L 3–24	2,000	
October 8	Wofford*^{†}	Richardson Stadium; Davidson, NC	L 15–32	3,000	
October 15	at Guilford*	Greensboro, NC	L 14–21		
October 22	at Colgate	Andy Kerr Stadium; Hamilton, NY	L 0–21	950	
October 29	at Bucknell	Memorial Stadium; Lewisburg, PA	L 13–21	2,250	
November 5	at East Tennessee State*	Memorial Center; Johnson City, TN	L 28–31	4,160	
November 12	Lafayette	Richardson Stadium; Davidson, NC	L 13–38	600	
*Non-conference game; ^{†}Homecoming
