= 1988 Bucknell Bison football team =

American college football season

1988 Bucknell Bison football
- Conference: Colonial League
- Record: 3–7 (2–3 Colonial)
- Head coach: George Landis (3rd season)
- Captains: Ed Foley; Chris Hackley; Steve Weiss
- Home stadium: Memorial Stadium

1988 Colonial League football standings
	Conf.					Overall
Team	W		L		T	W		L		T
Lafayette $	5	–	0	–	0	8	–	2	–	1
No. 19 Holy Cross	3	–	1	–	0	9	–	2	–	0
Lehigh	2	–	3	–	0	6	–	5	–	0
Bucknell	2	–	3	–	0	3	–	7	–	0
Colgate	2	–	3	–	0	2	–	9	–	0
Davidson	0	–	4	–	0	0	–	10	–	0
$ – Conference champion; Rankings from NCAA Division I-AA Football Committee poll

The 1988 Bucknell Bison football team was an American football team that represented Bucknell University during the 1988 NCAA Division I-AA football season. It tied for third in the Colonial League.

Bucknell played its home games at Memorial Stadium on the university campus in Lewisburg, Pennsylvania.

In its third and final year under head coach George Landis, the Bison compiled a 3–7 record. Ed Foley, Chris Hackley and Steve Weiss were the team captains.

The Bison were outscored 323 to 229. Their 2–3 conference record placed Bucknell in a three-way tie for third (and for next-to-last) in the six-team Colonial League standings.

== Schedule ==
Date	Opponent	Site	Result	Attendance	Source
September 10	Villanova*	Memorial Stadium; Lewisburg, PA	L 17–30	5,800	
September 17	Colgate	Memorial Stadium; Lewisburg, PA	L 13–14	2,120	
September 24	at Penn*	Franklin Field; Philadelphia, PA	L 35–38	9,456	
October 1	at Army*	Michie Stadium; West Point, NY	L 10–58	38,924	
October 8	No. 6 Lafayette^	Memorial Stadium; Lewisburg, PA	L 35–52	9,820	
October 15	Princeton^{†}*	Memorial Stadium; Lewisburg, PA	L 35–41	8,645	
October 22	at Columbia*	Wien Stadium; New York, NY	W 21–7	3,825	
October 29	Davidson	Memorial Stadium; Lewisburg, PA	W 21–13	2,250	
November 5	at Lehigh	Goodman Stadium; Bethlehem, PA	W 35–32	8,523	
November 12	at Holy Cross	Fitton Field; Worcester, MA	L 7–38	9,111	
*Non-conference game; ^{†}Homecoming; ^ Parents Weekend; Rankings from NCAA Division I-AA Football Committee Poll released prior to the game
