= 2015 Columbia Lions football team =

American college football season

2015 Columbia Lions football
- Conference: Ivy League
- Record: 2–8 (1–6 Ivy)
- Head coach: Al Bagnoli (1st season)
- Offensive coordinator: Mike Faragalli (1st season)
- Defensive coordinator: Paul Ferraro (1st season)
- Home stadium: Robert K. Kraft Field at Lawrence A. Wien Stadium

2015 Ivy League football standings
	Conf.			Overall
Team	W		L	W		L
No. 20 Harvard +	6	–	1	9	–	1
No. 23 Dartmouth +	6	–	1	9	–	1
Penn +	6	–	1	7	–	3
Yale	3	–	4	6	–	4
Brown	3	–	4	5	–	5
Princeton	2	–	5	5	–	5
Columbia	1	–	6	2	–	8
Cornell	1	–	6	1	–	9
+ – Conference co-champions; Rankings from STATS Poll

The 2015 Columbia Lions football team represented Columbia University in the 2015 NCAA Division I FCS football season. They were led by first year head coach Al Bagnoli and played their home games at Robert K. Kraft Field at Lawrence A. Wien Stadium. They were a member of the Ivy League. They finished the season 2–8, 1–6 in Ivy League play to finish a tie for seventh place. Columbia averaged 5,988 fans per game.

== Schedule ==
Date	Time	Opponent	Site	TV	Result	Attendance
September 19	1:00 p.m.	at No. 18 Fordham*	Coffey Field; Bronx, NY (Liberty Cup)		L 24–44	8,052
September 26	1:00 p.m.	Georgetown*	Robert K. Kraft Field at Lawrence A. Wien Stadium; New York, NY		L 16–24	5,175
October 2	7:00 p.m.	at Princeton	Powers Field at Princeton Stadium; Princeton, NJ	NBCSN	L 5–10	3,694
October 10	6:00 p.m.	Wagner*	Robert K. Kraft Field at Lawrence A. Wien Stadium; New York, NY		W 26–3	3,211
October 17	3:30 p.m.	Penn^{†}	Robert K. Kraft Field at Lawrence A. Wien Stadium; New York, NY	ESPN3	L 7–42	12,098
October 24	3:00 p.m.	at No. 25 Dartmouth	Memorial Stadium; Hanover, NH		L 9–13	4,713
October 31	12:30 p.m.	at Yale	Yale Bowl; New Haven, CT	FCS	W 17–7	7,259
November 7	1:00 p.m.	No. 13 Harvard	Robert K. Kraft Field at Lawrence A. Wien Stadium; New York, NY		L 16–24	5,494
November 14	12:30 p.m.	at Cornell	Schoellkopf Field; Ithaca, NY (rivalry)		L 0–3	3,233
November 20	7:30 p.m.	Brown	Robert K. Kraft Field at Lawrence A. Wien Stadium; New York, NY	NBCSN	L 23–28	3,964
*Non-conference game; ^{†}Homecoming; Rankings from STATS Poll released prior to the game; All times are in Eastern time
