= 2015 Brown Bears football team =

American college football season

2015 Brown Bears football
- Conference: Ivy League
- Record: 5–5 (3–4 Ivy)
- Head coach: Phil Estes (18th season)
- Offensive coordinator: Frank Sheehan (10th season)
- Offensive scheme: Pro-style
- Defensive coordinator: Michael Kelleher (15th season)
- Base defense: 4–3
- Home stadium: Brown Stadium

2015 Ivy League football standings
	Conf.			Overall
Team	W		L	W		L
No. 20 Harvard +	6	–	1	9	–	1
No. 23 Dartmouth +	6	–	1	9	–	1
Penn +	6	–	1	7	–	3
Yale	3	–	4	6	–	4
Brown	3	–	4	5	–	5
Princeton	2	–	5	5	–	5
Columbia	1	–	6	2	–	8
Cornell	1	–	6	1	–	9
+ – Conference co-champions; Rankings from STATS Poll

The 2015 Brown Bears football team represented Brown University as a member of the Ivy League during the 2015 NCAA Division I FCS football season. Led by 18th-year head coach Phil Estes, the Bears compiled an overall record of 5–5 with a mark of 3–4 in conference play, tying for fourth place in the Ivy League. Brown played home games at Brown Stadium in Providence, Rhode Island.

== Schedule ==
Date	Time	Opponent	Site	TV	Result	Attendance
September 19	12:30 p.m.	Bryant*	Brown Stadium; Providence, RI		L 16–20	3,261
September 26	7:00 p.m.	at No. 24 Harvard	Harvard Stadium; Boston, MA	FCS	L 27–53	15,804
October 3	6:00 p.m.	Rhode Island*	Brown Stadium; Providence, RI (rivalry)		W 41–31	5,183
October 10	1:00 p.m.	at Holy Cross*	Fitton Field; Worcester, MA		W 25–24	4,673
October 17	12:00 p.m.	Princeton	Brown Stadium; Providence, RI	ASN	W 38–31	6,481
October 24	12:30 p.m.	at Cornell	Schoellkopf Field; Ithaca, NY		W 44–24	5,138
October 31	12:30 p.m.	Penn	Brown Stadium; Providence, RI		L 28–48	5,114
November 7	12:30 p.m.	at Yale	Yale Bowl; New Haven, CT	FCS	L 14–41	6,878
November 14	12:30 p.m.	No. 23 Dartmouth	Brown Stadium; Providence, RI		L 18–34	4,072
November 20	7:30 p.m.	at Columbia	Robert K. Kraft Field at Lawrence A. Wien Stadium; New York, NY	NBCSN	W 28–23	3,964
*Non-conference game; Rankings from STATS Poll released prior to the game; All times are in Eastern time
