= 1988 Princeton Tigers football team =

American college football season

1988 Princeton Tigers football
- Conference: Ivy League
- Record: 6–4 (4–3 Ivy)
- Head coach: Steve Tosches (2nd season)
- Captain: Jason Garrett
- Home stadium: Palmer Stadium

1988 Ivy League football standings
	Conf.					Overall
Team	W		L		T	W		L		T
Penn +	6	–	1	–	0	9	–	1	–	0
Cornell +	6	–	1	–	0	7	–	2	–	1
Princeton	4	–	3	–	0	6	–	4	–	0
Dartmouth	4	–	3	–	0	5	–	5	–	0
Yale	3	–	3	–	1	3	–	6	–	1
Columbia	2	–	5	–	0	2	–	8	–	0
Harvard	2	–	5	–	0	2	–	8	–	0
Brown	0	–	6	–	1	0	–	9	–	1
+ – Conference co-champions

The 1988 Princeton Tigers football team was an American football team that represented Princeton University during the 1988 NCAA Division I-AA football season. Princeton tied for third in the Ivy League.

In their second year under head coach Steve Tosches, the Tigers compiled a 6–4 record and outscored opponents 269 to 208. Quarterback Jason Garrett was the team captain.

Princeton's 4–3 conference record tied for third in the Ivy League standings. The Tigers outscored Ivy opponents 167 to 130.

Princeton played its home games at Palmer Stadium on the university campus in Princeton, New Jersey.

== Schedule ==
Date	Opponent	Site	Result	Attendance	Source
September 17	at Cornell	Schoellkopf Field; Ithaca, NY	W 26–17	12,000	
September 24	Holy Cross*	Palmer Stadium; Princeton, NJ	L 26–30	10,200	
October 1	Brown	Palmer Stadium; Princeton, NJ	W 31–27	10,800	
October 8	at Columbia	Wien Stadium; New York, NY	L 13–16	5,420	
October 15	at Bucknell*	Memorial Stadium; Lewisburg, PA	W 41–35	8,645	
October 22	Harvard	Palmer Stadium; Princeton, NJ (rivalry)	W 23–8	17,400	
October 29	Penn	Palmer Stadium; Princeton, NJ (rivalry)	L 23–31	24,500	
November 5	Colgate*	Palmer Stadium; Princeton, NJ	W 45–13	2,000	
November 12	at Yale	Yale Bowl; New Haven, CT (rivalry)	W 24–7	23,688	
November 19	Dartmouth	Palmer Stadium; Princeton, NJ	L 17–24	8,500	
*Non-conference game
