= Lambert-Meadowlands Trophy =

Annual award given to the best team in Division I FBS college football

Lambert Trophy
- The Lambert Trophy on display in the Army Sports Hall of Fame at the United States Military Academy in 2019.
- Awarded for: the best team in the East in Division I FBS (formerly I-A) college football. Eastern championship
- Location: Eastern United States
- Country: United States
- Presented by: Lambert Trophy Championship Association

History
- First award: 1936
- First winner: Pittsburgh
- Most recent: Navy
- Next ceremony: 2026
- Website: LambertTrophy.org

The Lambert Trophy (formerly the "Lambert-Meadowlands Trophy") is an annual award given to the best team in the East in Division I FBS (formerly Division I-A) college football.

In affiliation with the Metropolitan New York Football Writers (founded 1935), the Lambert Trophy was established by brothers Victor A. and Henry L. Lambert in memory of their father, August V. Lambert. The Lamberts were the principals in a distinguished Madison Avenue jewelry house and were prominent college football boosters.

By the time the “Lambert Trophy” was established in 1936, major schools in other regions of the country had formed their own leagues (i.e., SEC, Big Ten, Big Eight, Pacific Coast Conference, etc.) and Division I FBS (formerly I-A) schools located in the Northeast and Mid-Atlantic regions remained independent, with the exception of the 1954 formation of the Ivy League. Emblematic of the "Eastern championship", the Lambert Trophy, voted on by a panel of sports writers in New York, became the de facto conference championship for those schools.

Since 1936, there have been 19 different winners in Division I-A/FBS. To be eligible for the Lambert Award, a school must be located in the "East." Teams in the "East" were originally interpreted as being north of Washington D.C. and east of the western boundary of Pennsylvania, but has sometimes been expanded to include teams located in New York, New Jersey, Massachusetts, Pennsylvania, Maryland, Virginia, West Virginia, Delaware and the District of Columbia (although there are no FBS teams in Washington D.C., there are teams that compete at lower levels that can win the various Lambert Cup awards for their levels). Additionally, while the Big East Conference was a football conference, members of that conference outside of the "East" were also made eligible if at least half their schedule was against Lambert-eligible teams.

A set of parallel trophies collectively known as the Lambert Cup were formerly awarded to teams in Division I FCS (formerly I-AA), Division II, and Division III. The Metropolitan New York Football Writers, owned and operated by American Football Networks, Inc., took the administration of the Lambert Meadowlands Awards back from the New Jersey Sports & Exhibition Authority in 2011.

In 2024, the Lambert Trophy was revived and has been awarded without hiatus since. The newly announced Lambert Trophy Championship Association awarded retroactive championships to Pittsburgh for 2021 and Penn State for 2023. It was additionally re-announced that Penn State had been awarded the trophy in 2022. Boston College, Temple, Navy, Army, Buffalo, West Virginia, Pittsburgh, Rutgers, Penn State, UMass, UConn, and Syracuse had automatic eligibility for The Lambert Trophy in 2024, with Delaware becoming eligible in 2025.

== Lambert Trophy winners ==
=== By year ===
Year	School	Record	Final AP rank	Bowl
1936	Pittsburgh	8–1–1	No. 3	Won Rose
1937	Pittsburgh	9–0–1	No. 1	No bowl
1938	Carnegie Tech	7–2	No. 6	Lost Sugar
1939	Cornell	8–0	No. 4	No bowl
1940	Boston College	11–0	No. 5	Won Sugar
1941	Fordham	8–1	No. 6	Won Sugar
1942	Boston College	8–2	No. 8	Lost Orange
1943	Navy	8–1	No. 4	No bowl
1944	Army	9–0	No. 1	No bowl
1945	Army	9–0	No. 1	No bowl
1946	Army	9–0–1	No. 2	No bowl
1947	Penn State	9–0–1	No. 4	Tied Cotton
1948	Army	8–0–1	No. 6	No bowl
1949	Army	9–0	No. 4	No bowl
1950	Princeton	9–0	No. 6	No bowl
1951	Princeton	9–0	No. 6	No bowl
1952	Syracuse	7–3	No. 14	Lost Orange
1953	Army	7–1–1	No. 14	No bowl
1954	Navy	8–2	No. 5	Won Sugar
1955	Pittsburgh	7–4	No. 11	Lost Sugar
1956	Syracuse	7–2	No. 8	Lost Cotton
1957	Navy	8–1–1	No. 5	Won Cotton
1958	Army	8–0–1	No. 3	No bowl
1959	Syracuse	11–0	No. 1	Won Cotton
1960	Navy	9–2	No. 4	Lost Orange
1960	Yale	9–0	No. 14	No bowl
1961	Penn State	8–3	No. 17	Won Gator
1962	Penn State	9–2	No. 9	Lost Gator
1963	Navy	9–2	No. 2	Lost Cotton
1964	Penn State	6–4	NR	No bowl
1965	Dartmouth	9–0	NR	No bowl
1966	Syracuse	8–3	NR	Lost Gator
1967	Penn State	8–2–1	No. 10	Tied Gator
1968	Penn State	11–0	No. 2	Won Orange
1969	Penn State	11–0	No. 2	Won Orange
1970	Dartmouth	9–0	No. 14	No bowl
1971	Penn State	11–1	No. 5	Won Cotton
1972	Penn State	10–2	No. 10	Lost Sugar
1973	Penn State	12–0	No. 5	Won Orange
1974	Penn State	10–2	No. 7	Won Cotton
1975	Penn State	9–3	No. 10	Lost Sugar
1976	Pittsburgh	12–0	No. 1	Won Sugar
1977	Penn State	11–1	No. 5	Won Fiesta
1978	Penn State	11–1	No. 4	Lost Sugar
1979	Pittsburgh	11–1	No. 7	Won Fiesta
1980	Pittsburgh	11–1	No. 2	Won Gator
1981	Penn State	10–2	No. 3	Won Fiesta
1982	Penn State	11–1	No. 1	Won Sugar
1983	Boston College	9–3	No. 19	Lost Liberty
1984	Boston College	10–2	No. 5	Won Cotton
1985	Penn State	11–1	No. 3	Lost Orange
1986	Penn State	12–0	No. 1	Won Fiesta
1987	Syracuse	11–0–1	No. 4	Tied Sugar
1988	West Virginia	11–1	No. 5	Lost Fiesta
1989	Penn State	8–3–1	No. 15	Won Holiday
1990	Penn State	9–3	No. 11	Lost Blockbuster
1991	Penn State	11–2	No. 3	Won Fiesta
1992	Syracuse	10–2	No. 6	Won Fiesta
1993	West Virginia	11–1	No. 7	Lost Sugar
1994	Penn State	12–0	No. 2	Won Rose
1995	Virginia Tech	10–2	No. 10	Won Sugar
1996	Penn State	11–2	No. 7	Won Fiesta
1997	Penn State	9–3	No. 16	Lost Citrus
1998	Penn State	9–3	No. 17	Won Outback
1999	Virginia Tech	11–1	No. 2	Lost Sugar
2000	Miami (FL)	11–1	No. 2	Won Sugar
2001	Miami (FL)	12–0	No. 1	Won Rose
2002	Miami (FL)	12–1	No. 2	Lost Fiesta
2003	Miami (FL)	11–2	No. 5	Won Orange
2004	Boston College	9–3	No. 21	Won Continental Tire
2005	Penn State	11–1	No. 3	Won Orange
2006	Louisville	12–1	No. 5	Won Orange
2007	West Virginia	11–2	No. 6	Won Fiesta
2008	Penn State	11–2	No. 8	Lost Rose
2009	Penn State	11–2	No. 9	Won Capital One
2010	Connecticut	8–5	NR	Lost Fiesta
2011	West Virginia	10–3	No. 17	Won Orange
2012	Cincinnati	10–3	NR	Won Belk
2013	Penn State	7–5	NR	No Bowl
2014	Rutgers	8–5	NR	Won Quick Lane
2015	Navy	11–2	No. 18	Won Military
2016	Penn State	11–3	No. 7	Lost Rose
2017	Penn State	11–2	No. 8	Won Fiesta
2018	Army	11–2	No. 19	Won Armed Forces
2019	Penn State	11–2	No. 9	Won Cotton
2020	Army	9–3	NR	Lost Liberty
2021	Pittsburgh	11–3	No. 13	Lost Peach
2022	Penn State	11–2	No. 7	Won Rose
2023	Penn State	10–3	No. 13	Lost Peach
2024	Penn State	13–3	No. 5	Won CFP First Round, Won Fiesta, Lost Orange
2025	Navy	11–2	No. 23	Won Liberty

=== By team ===
School	Total	Years won
Penn State	35	1947, 1961, 1962, 1964, 1967, 1968, 1969, 1971, 1972, 1973, 1974, 1975, 1977, 1978, 1981, 1982, 1985, 1986, 1989, 1990, 1991, 1994, 1996, 1997, 1998, 2005, 2008, 2009, 2013, 2016, 2017, 2019, 2022, 2023, 2024
Army	9	1944, 1945, 1946, 1948, 1949, 1953, 1958, 2018, 2020
Pittsburgh	7	1936, 1937, 1955, 1976, 1979, 1980, 2021
Navy	7	1943, 1954, 1957, 1960 (co-champions), 1963, 2015, 2025
Syracuse	6	1952, 1956, 1959, 1966, 1987, 1992
Boston College	5	1940, 1942, 1983, 1984, 2004
Miami (FL)*	4	2000, 2001, 2002, 2003
West Virginia	4	1988, 1993, 2007, 2011
Dartmouth^	2	1965, 1970
Princeton^	2	1950, 1951
Virginia Tech*	2	1995, 1999
Carnegie Tech†	1	1938
Cincinnati*	1	2012
Connecticut	1	2010
Cornell^	1	1939
Fordham^	1	1941
Louisville*	1	2006
Rutgers	1	2014
Yale^	1	1960 (co-champions)

^ Now a member of the Football Championship Subdivision (FCS).
† Now a member of NCAA Division III.

* No longer eligible to win Lambert Trophy

== Lambert Cup ==
=== Football Championship Subdivision (Division I-AA) ===
Year	Team	Record	Playoff results
1982	Delaware	12–2	Championship Game
1983	Holy Cross	9–2–1	First Round
1984	Rhode Island	10–3	Semifinals
1985	Rhode Island	10–3	Quarterfinals
1986	Holy Cross	10–1	Did not play (Patriot)
1987	Holy Cross	11–0	Did not play (Patriot)
1988	Holy Cross	9–2	Did not play (Patriot)
1989	Holy Cross	10–1	Did not play (Patriot)
1990	William & Mary	10–3	Quarterfinals
1991	Delaware	10–2	First Round
1992	Villanova	9–3	First Round
1993	Boston University	12–1	Quarterfinals
1994	James Madison	10–3	Quarterfinals
1995	Delaware	11–2	Quarterfinals
1996	William & Mary	10–3	Quarterfinals
1997	Delaware	12–2	Semifinals
1998	UMass	12–3	National Champions
1999	Hofstra	11–2	Quarterfinals
2000	Delaware	12–2	Semifinals

Year	Team	Record	Playoff results
2001	Lehigh	11–1	Quarterfinals
2002	Villanova	11–4	Semifinals
2003	Delaware	15–1	National Champions
2004	James Madison	13–2	National Champions
2005	New Hampshire	11–2	Quarterfinals
2006	UMass	13–2	Championship Game
2007	Delaware	11–4	Championship Game
2008	James Madison	12–2	Semifinals
2009	Villanova	14–1	National Champions
2010	Delaware	12–3	Championship Game
2011	Lehigh	11–2	Quarterfinals
2012	Old Dominion	11–2	Quarterfinals
2013	Towson	13–3	Championship Game
2014	New Hampshire	12–2	Semifinals
2015	Dartmouth; Harvard; Penn	9–1; 9–1; 7–3	Did not play (Ivy)
2016	James Madison	14–1	National Champions
2017	James Madison	14–1	Championship Game
2018	Colgate	10–2	Quarterfinals
2019	James Madison	14–2	Championship Game

Year	Team	Record	Playoff results
2020	James Madison	7–1	Semifinals
2021	James Madison	12–2	Semifinals
2022	Holy Cross; William & Mary	12–1; 11–2	Quarterfinals; Quarterfinals
2023	Albany	11–4	Semifinals
2024	Rhode Island	11–3	Second Round
2025	Villanova	12–3	Semifinals

NOTE: Until 2025, the Ivy League, and until 1997, the Patriot League, did not participate in the NCAA Division I Football Tournament.

==== Most FCS Lambert Cups ====
Team	Total	Years won
Delaware †	8	1982, 1991, 1995, 1997, 2000, 2003, 2007, 2010
James Madison †	8	1994, 2004, 2008, 2016, 2017, 2019, 2020, 2021
Holy Cross	6	1983, 1986, 1987, 1988, 1989, 2022
Villanova	4	1992, 2002, 2009, 2025
Rhode Island	3	1984, 1985, 2024
William & Mary	3	1990, 1996, 2022
Lehigh	2	2001, 2011
UMass †	2	1998, 2006
New Hampshire	2	2005, 2014
Albany	1	2023
Boston University ‡	1	1993
Colgate	1	2018
Dartmouth	1	2015
Harvard	1	2015
Hofstra ‡	1	1999
Old Dominion †	1	2012
Penn	1	2015
Towson	1	2013

† Now a member of the Football Bowl Subdivision (FBS).
‡ Discontinued football

=== Division II ===
Year	Team	Record	Playoff results
1957	Lehigh	8–1	No playoffs
1958	Buffalo	8–1	Tangerine Bowl (refused)
1959	Delaware	8–1	No playoffs
1960	Bucknell	7–2	No playoffs
1961	Lehigh	7–2	No playoffs
1962	Delaware	7–2	No playoffs
1963	Delaware	8–0	No playoffs
1964	Bucknell	7–2	No playoffs
1965	Maine	8–2	Tangerine Bowl (L)
1966	Gettysburg	7–2	No playoffs
1967	West Chester	10–1	Tangerine Bowl (L)
1968	Delaware	8–3	Boardwalk Bowl
1969	Delaware	9–2	Boardwalk Bowl
1969	Wesleyan	8–0	No playoffs
1970	Delaware	9–2	Boardwalk Bowl
1971	Delaware	10–1	National Champions
1972	Delaware	10–0	National Champions
1973	Delaware	8–4	Quarterfinals
1973	Lehigh	7–4–1	Quarterfinals
1974	Delaware	12–2	Championship Game
1975	Lehigh	9–3	Quarterfinals
1976	Delaware	8–3–1	Quarterfinals
1977	Lehigh	12–2	National Champions
1978	UMass	9–4	I-AA Championship Game
1979	Delaware	13–1	National Champions
1980	Lehigh	9–1–2	I-AA Semifinals
1981	Shippensburg	12–1	Div II Semifinals
1982	East Stroudsburg	9–2	No playoffs
1983	Towson State	10–2	Quarterfinals
1984	Towson State	9–4	Semifinals
1985	Bloomsburg	12–1	Semifinals
1986	Towson State	8–3–1	Quarterfinals

Year	Team	Record	Playoff results
1987	IUP	10–2	Quarterfinals
1988	Millersville	10–2	Quarterfinals
1989	IUP	11–2	Semifinals
1990	IUP	12–2	Championship Game
1991	IUP	12–1	Semifinals
1992	New Haven	12–1	Semifinals
1993	IUP	13–1	Championship Game
1994	IUP	10–3	Semifinals
1995	New Haven	10–1–1	Quarterfinals
1996	Clarion	11–3	Semifinals
1997	New Haven	12–2	Championship Game
1998	Slippery Rock	12–2	Semifinals
1999	IUP	9–4	Semifinals
2000	Bloomsburg	12–3	Championship Game
2001	IUP	8–2	First Round
2002	IUP	11–2	Quarterfinals
2003	IUP	10–1	No playoffs
2004	West Chester	11–4	Semifinals
2005	East Stroudsburg	11–3	Semifinals
2006	West Chester	9–4	Second Round
2007	California (PA)	13–1	Semifinals
2008	West Chester	9–4	Second Round
2009	California (PA)	11–4	Semifinals
2010	Mercyhurst	10–3	Quarterfinals
2011	New Haven	11–2	Quarterfinals
2012	IUP	12–2	Quarterfinals
2013	West Chester	13–2	Semifinals
2014	Bloomsburg	11–2	Quarterfinals
2015	Shepherd	13–1	Championship Game
2016	Shepherd	13–1	Semifinals
2017	IUP	13–1	Semifinals
2018	LIU Post	10–1	First Round

Year	Team	Record	Playoff results
2019	West Chester	9–3	First Round
2020	N/A	N/A	–
2021	N/A	N/A	–
2022	IUP	10–2	Quarterfinals

==== Most D-II Lambert Cups ====
School	Total	Years won
IUP	13	1987, 1989, 1990, 1991, 1993, 1994, 1999, 2001, 2002, 2003, 2012, 2017, 2022
Delaware ‡	11	1959, 1962, 1963, 1968, 1969(½), 1970, 1971, 1972, 1973(½), 1974, 1976, 1979
West Chester	6	1967, 2004, 2006, 2008, 2013, 2019
Lehigh †	5½	1957, 1961, 1973 (½), 1975, 1977, 1980
New Haven †	4	1992, 1995, 1997, 2011
Bloomsburg	3	1985, 2000, 2014
Towson State †	3	1983, 1984, 1986
Bucknell †	2	1960, 1964
California (PA)	2	2007, 2009
East Stroudsburg	2	1982, 2005
Shepherd	2	2015, 2016
Buffalo ‡	1	1958
Clarion	1	1996
Gettysburg ^	1	1966
LIU Post †	1	2018
Maine †	1	1965
UMass ‡	1	1978
Mercyhurst †	1	2010
Millersville	1	1988
Shippensburg	1	1981
Slippery Rock	1	1998
Wesleyan ^	½	1969 (½)

‡ Now a member of the Football Bowl Subdivision (FBS).
† Now a member of the Football Championship Subdivision (FCS).
^ Now a member of Division III.

=== Division III ===
Year	Team
1966	Wilkes
1967	Wagner
1968	Wilkes
1969	Merchant Marine
1970	Edinboro
1971	Alfred
1972	Franklin & Marshall
1973	C. W. Post
1974	Ithaca
1975	Ithaca
1976	C. W. Post
1977	Westminster (PA)
1978	Ithaca
1979	Carnegie Mellon
1980	Ithaca
1981	Widener
1982	Plymouth State

Year	Team
1983	Hofstra
1984	Union (NY)
1984	Ithaca
1985	Ithaca
1986	Salisbury State
1987	Wagner
1988	Ithaca
1989	Union (NY)
1990	Allegheny
1991	Ithaca
1992	Washington & Jefferson
1993	Rowan
1994	Washington & Jefferson
1995	Rowan
1996	Rowan
1997	Lycoming
1998	Rowan

Year	Team
1999	Rowan
2000	Widener
2001	Rowan
2002	Brockport
2003	RPI
2004	Rowan
2005	Rowan
2006	St. John Fisher
2007	Wesley
2008	Cortland
2009	Wesley
2010	Wesley
2011	Wesley
2012	Hobart
2013	St. John Fisher
2014	Wesley
2015	Wesley

Year	Team
2016	Alfred
2017	Brockport
2018	Johns Hopkins
2019	Muhlenberg
2020	N/A
2021	N/A
2022	Ithaca

==== Most D-III Lambert Cups ====
Team	Total	Years won
Ithaca	8½	1974, 1975, 1978, 1980, 1984 (½), 1985, 1988, 1991, 2022
Rowan	8	1993, 1995, 1996, 1998, 1999, 2001, 2004, 2005
Wesley ^	6	2007, 2009, 2010, 2011, 2014, 2015
Alfred	2	1971, 2016
Brockport	2	2002, 2017
C. W. Post †	2	1973, 1976
St. John Fisher	2	2006, 2013
Wagner †	2	1967, 1987
Washington & Jefferson	2	1992, 1994
Widener	2	1981, 2000
Wilkes	2	1966, 1968
Union (NY)	1½	1984 (½), 1989
Allegheny	1	1990
Carnegie Mellon	1	1979
Cortland	1	2008
Edinboro ‡	1	1970
Franklin & Marshall	1	1972
Hobart	1	2012
Hofstra ^	1	1983
Johns Hopkins	1	2018
Lycoming	1	1997
Merchant Marine	1	1969
Muhlenberg	1	2019
Plymouth State	1	1982
RPI	1	2003
Salisbury	1	1986
Westminster (PA)	1	1977

† Now a member of the Football Championship Subdivision (FCS).
‡ Now a member of Division II.
^ Discontinued football
