= Colgate–Cornell football rivalry =

American college football rivalry

- Colgate Raiders Cornell Big Red
- Sport: Football
- First meeting: September 26, 1896; Cornell, 6–0
- Latest meeting: September 19, 2026; Colgate, 20–7
- Next meeting: 2027

Statistics
- Total meetings: 107
- All-time series: Colgate, 53–51–3
- Largest victory: Colgate, 60–7 (1983)
- Longest win streak: Cornell, 10 (1896–1905); Colgate, 10 (1993–2005)
- Longest unbeaten streak: Cornell, 14 (1896–1911)
- Current win streak: Colgate, 4 (2023–present)

Locations of Colgate and Cornell

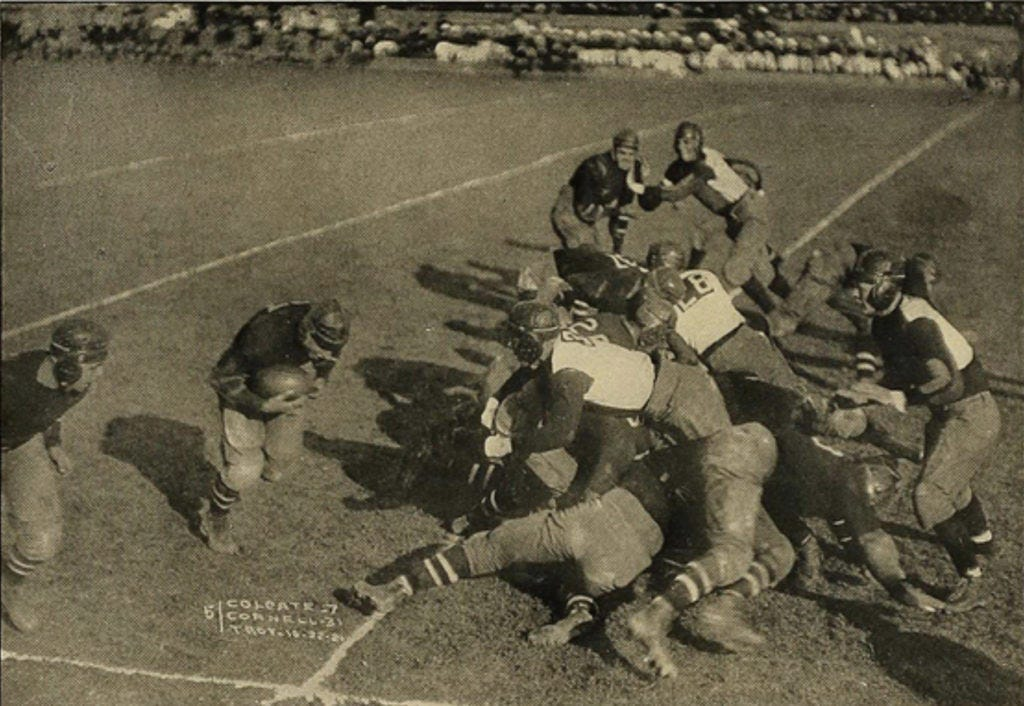
Cornell runs the football during the 1921 Colgate–Cornell game

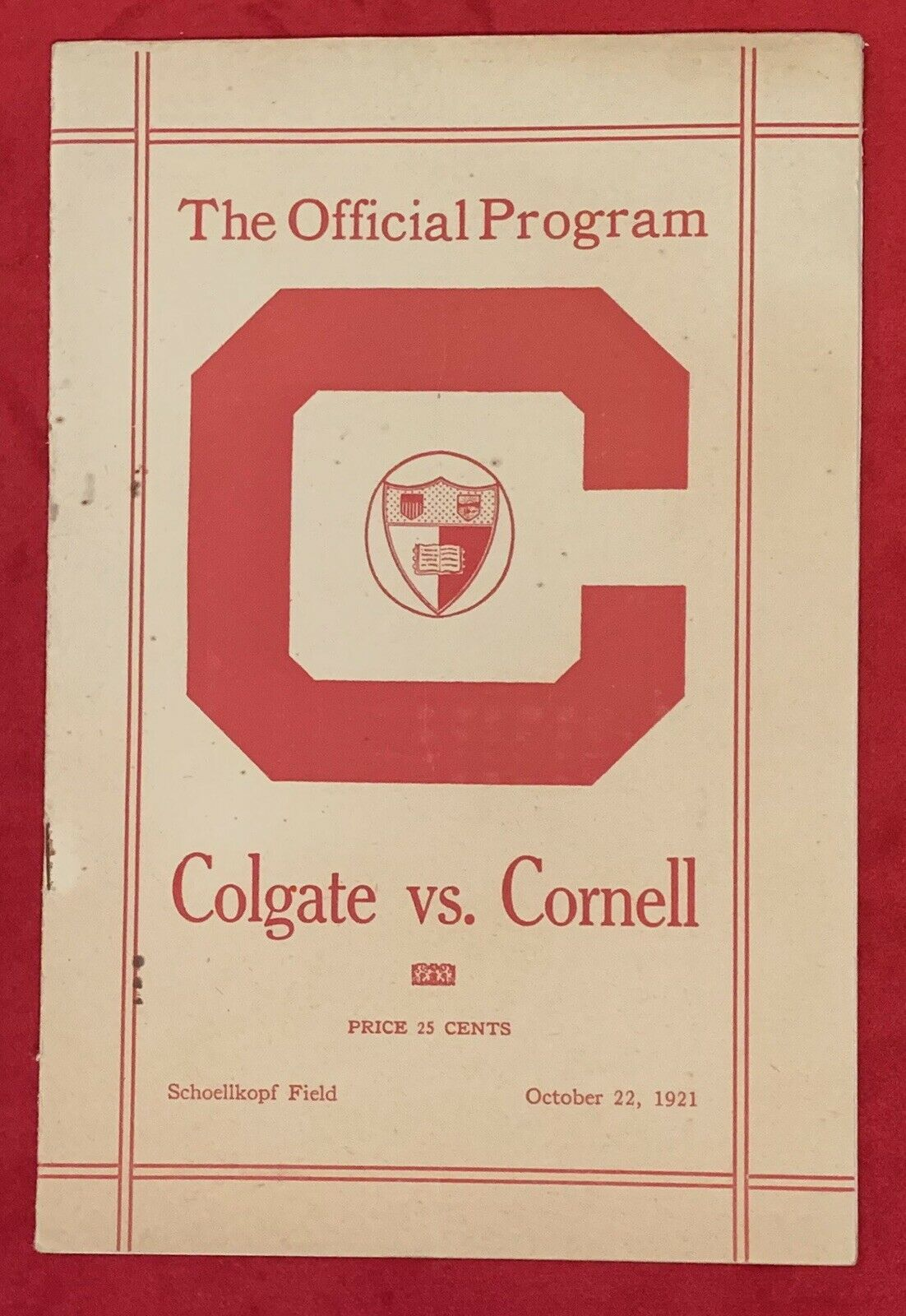
Program from 1921 Colgate–Cornell game

The Colgate–Cornell football rivalry is an American college football rivalry between the Colgate Raiders and the Cornell Big Red. The two teams have met 107 times since their first meeting in 1896. Cornell has played Colgate in football more times than any other opponent except Ivy League rivals Penn and Columbia. Colgate leads the series, 53–51–3 after their win in 2026.

== History ==
Cornell University, located in Tompkins County, New York, and Colgate University, located in Madison County, New York, are less than 100 miles from each other. Their close proximity and membership in rival athletic conferences (the Ivy League and the Patriot League, respectively) contribute to the rivalry between the two schools.

The Cornell and Colgate football teams met for the first time in Ithaca on September 26, 1896, a game that ended in a 6–0 victory for Cornell. Cornell would go on to win or tie the next 13 meetings until Colgate clinched its first win in the series, 13–7, in 1912. Cornell continued to dominate the series, compiling a 29–7–2 record against Colgate through 1951. Colgate took 9 of 13 meetings from 1952 through 1964, after which Cornell returned to dominance, winning 8 of 10 from 1965 through 1974. Since then, Colgate has held the advantage in the series, but Cornell's early dominance has rendered the all-time series record nearly even.

The game is usually played in late September or early October and has alternated between Cornell's Schoellkopf Field in Ithaca, New York, and Colgate's Andy Kerr Stadium in Hamilton, New York, since 2009. The rivalry has been largely uninterrupted from its beginning in 1896, but the teams did not meet in 1909–10, 1915–16, 1918, and 1924–36. The Cornell–Colgate game has been annual since 1937, save for four exceptions in 1994, 1995, 1998, and 2012. Of the teams' more notable meetings, Colgate was Cornell's opponent when Cornell played its first-ever Friday night home game in 2015, which Colgate won 28–21. In 2016, the Big Red defeated the nationally-ranked Raiders in Hamilton, 39–38, after having trailed 28–5; it was the first time Cornell defeated a ranked team on the road since 1950.

== Game results ==
| Colgate victories | Cornell victories | Tie games |

| No. | Date | Location | Winner | Score |
|---|---|---|---|---|
| 1 | September 26, 1896 | Ithaca, NY | Cornell | 6–0 |
| 2 | September 25, 1897 | Ithaca, NY | Cornell | 6–0 |
| 3 | September 24, 1898 | Ithaca, NY | Cornell | 29–5 |
| 4 | September 23, 1899 | Richfield Springs, NY | Cornell | 42–0 |
| 5 | September 26, 1900 | Ithaca, NY | Cornell | 16–0 |
| 6 | September 28, 1901 | Ithaca, NY | Cornell | 17–0 |
| 7 | September 27, 1902 | Ithaca, NY | Cornell | 5–0 |
| 8 | October 10, 1903 | Ithaca, NY | Cornell | 12–0 |
| 9 | September 28, 1904 | Ithaca, NY | Cornell | 17–0 |
| 10 | September 30, 1905 | Ithaca, NY | Cornell | 12–11 |
| 11 | September 29, 1906 | Ithaca, NY | Tie | 0–0 |
| 12 | October 12, 1907 | Ithaca, NY | Cornell | 18–0 |
| 13 | October 17, 1908 | Ithaca, NY | Cornell | 9–0 |
| 14 | September 30, 1911 | Ithaca, NY | Cornell | 6–0 |
| 15 | September 28, 1912 | Ithaca, NY | Colgate | 13–7 |
| 16 | October 1, 1913 | Ithaca, NY | Tie | 0–0 |
| 17 | October 3, 1914 | Ithaca, NY | Colgate | 7–3 |
| 18 | October 20, 1917 | Ithaca, NY | Colgate | 20–0 |
| 19 | October 18, 1919 | Ithaca, NY | Colgate | 21–0 |
| 20 | October 23, 1920 | Ithaca, NY | Cornell | 42–6 |
| 21 | October 22, 1921 | Ithaca, NY | Cornell | 31–7 |
| 22 | October 21, 1922 | Ithaca, NY | Cornell | 14–0 |
| 23 | October 20, 1923 | Ithaca, NY | Cornell | 34–7 |
| 24 | October 2, 1937 | Ithaca, NY | Cornell | 40–7 |
| 25 | October 1, 1938 | Ithaca, NY | Cornell | 15–6 |
| 26 | November 11, 1939 | Ithaca, NY | Cornell | 14–12 |
| 27 | October 5, 1940 | Ithaca, NY | Cornell | 34–0 |
| 28 | October 25, 1941 | Ithaca, NY | Cornell | 21–2 |
| 29 | October 3, 1942 | Ithaca, NY | Colgate | 18–6 |
| 30 | October 23, 1943 | Syracuse, NY | Colgate | 20–7 |
| 31 | October 14, 1944 | Ithaca, NY | Colgate | 14–7 |
| 32 | November 10, 1945 | Ithaca, NY | Cornell | 20–6 |
| 33 | October 12, 1946 | Ithaca, NY | Cornell | 13–9 |
| 34 | October 11, 1947 | Hamilton, NY | Cornell | 27–18 |
| 35 | November 6, 1948 | Ithaca, NY | Cornell | 14–6 |
| 36 | October 1, 1949 | Ithaca, NY | Cornell | 39–27 |
| 37 | November 11, 1950 | Ithaca, NY | Cornell | 26–18 |
| 38 | October 6, 1951 | Hamilton, NY | Cornell | 41–18 |
| 39 | September 27, 1952 | Ithaca, NY | Colgate | 14–7 |
| 40 | September 26, 1953 | Ithaca, NY | Cornell | 27–7 |
| 41 | September 25, 1954 | Ithaca, NY | Colgate | 19–14 |
| 42 | October 1, 1955 | Ithaca, NY | Colgate | 21–6 |
| 43 | September 29, 1956 | Hamilton, NY | Colgate | 34–6 |
| 44 | September 28, 1957 | Ithaca, NY | Colgate | 14–13 |
| 45 | September 27, 1958 | Ithaca, NY | Cornell | 13–0 |
| 46 | September 26, 1959 | Hamilton, NY | Cornell | 20–15 |
| 47 | September 24, 1960 | Ithaca, NY | Colgate | 28–8 |
| 48 | September 30, 1961 | Ithaca, NY | Cornell | 34–0 |
| 49 | September 29, 1962 | Ithaca, NY | Colgate | 23–12 |
| 50 | September 28, 1963 | Ithaca, NY | Colgate | 21–17 |
| 51 | October 3, 1964 | Hamilton, NY | Colgate | 8–3 |
| 52 | September 25, 1965 | Ithaca, NY | Tie | 0–0 |
| 53 | October 1, 1966 | Ithaca, NY | Cornell | 15–14 |
| 54 | October 7, 1967 | Hamilton, NY | Cornell | 23–7 |

| No. | Date | Location | Winner | Score |
|---|---|---|---|---|
| 55 | September 28, 1968 | Ithaca, NY | Cornell | 17–0 |
| 56 | September 27, 1969 | Ithaca, NY | Colgate | 28–24 |
| 57 | September 26, 1970 | Hamilton, NY | Cornell | 17–7 |
| 58 | September 25, 1971 | Ithaca, NY | Cornell | 38–20 |
| 59 | September 30, 1972 | Ithaca, NY | Cornell | 37–7 |
| 60 | September 29, 1973 | Hamilton, NY | Cornell | 35–21 |
| 61 | September 28, 1974 | Ithaca, NY | Cornell | 40–21 |
| 62 | September 27, 1975 | Ithaca, NY | Colgate | 24–22 |
| 63 | September 25, 1976 | Ithaca, NY | Colgate | 25–20 |
| 64 | September 24, 1977 | Ithaca, NY | Colgate | 28–22 |
| 65 | September 30, 1978 | Hamilton, NY | Cornell | 21–12 |
| 66 | September 29, 1979 | Ithaca, NY | Cornell | 36–21 |
| 67 | September 27, 1980 | Hamilton, NY | Colgate | 38–20 |
| 68 | September 26, 1981 | Ithaca, NY | Colgate | 34–10 |
| 69 | September 25, 1982 | Ithaca, NY | Colgate | 21–6 |
| 70 | September 24, 1983 | Ithaca, NY | Colgate | 60–7 |
| 71 | September 29, 1984 | Hamilton, NY | Colgate | 35–7 |
| 72 | September 28, 1985 | Ithaca, NY | Colgate | 21–20 |
| 73 | September 27, 1986 | Hamilton, NY | Cornell | 21–12 |
| 74 | September 26, 1987 | Ithaca, NY | Colgate | 27–3 |
| 75 | September 24, 1988 | Ithaca, NY | Cornell | 17–14 |
| 76 | September 22, 1990 | Hamilton, NY | Colgate | 59–24 |
| 77 | September 28, 1991 | Ithaca, NY | Colgate | 31–13 |
| 78 | October 17, 1992 | Hamilton, NY | Cornell | 25–7 |
| 79 | September 25, 1993 | Ithaca, NY | Colgate | 22–6 |
| 80 | October 19, 1996 | Ithaca, NY | Colgate | 31–21 |
| 81 | September 27, 1997 | Ithaca, NY | Colgate | 44–38^{OT} |
| 82 | October 16, 1999 | Hamilton, NY | Colgate | 55–16 |
| 83 | October 14, 2000 | Ithaca, NY | Colgate | 23–16 |
| 84 | September 29, 2001 | Hamilton, NY | Colgate | 35–32 |
| 85 | October 19, 2002 | Ithaca, NY | Colgate | 42–13 |
| 86 | October 4, 2003 | Ithaca, NY | Colgate | 27–24 |
| 87 | October 16, 2004 | Ithaca, NY | Colgate | 10–6 |
| 88 | October 1, 2005 | Hamilton, NY | Colgate | 34–20 |
| 89 | October 14, 2006 | Ithaca, NY | Cornell | 38–14 |
| 90 | October 13, 2007 | Ithaca, NY | Cornell | 17–14 |
| 91 | October 18, 2008 | Ithaca, NY | Colgate | 38–22 |
| 92 | October 3, 2009 | Hamilton, NY | Colgate | 45–23 |
| 93 | October 16, 2010 | Ithaca, NY | Colgate | 44–3 |
| 94 | October 15, 2011 | Hamilton, NY | Colgate | 35–28^{OT} |
| 95 | October 5, 2013 | Ithaca, NY | Colgate | 41–20 |
| 96 | September 20, 2014 | Hamilton, NY | Colgate | 27–12 |
| 97 | October 2, 2015 | Ithaca, NY | Colgate | 28–21 |
| 98 | October 1, 2016 | Hamilton, NY | Cornell | 39–38 |
| 99 | September 30, 2017 | Ithaca, NY | Colgate | 21–7 |
| 100 | October 13, 2018 | Hamilton, NY | Colgate | 31–0 |
| 101 | October 19, 2019 | Ithaca, NY | Colgate | 21–20 |
| 102 | October 15, 2021 | Ithaca, NY | Cornell | 34–20 |
| 103 | October 1, 2022 | Hamilton, NY | Cornell | 34–31 |
| 104 | September 30, 2023 | Ithaca, NY | Colgate | 35–25 |
| 105 | September 21, 2024 | Hamilton, NY | Colgate | 41–24 |
| 106 | October 4, 2025 | Ithaca, NY | Colgate | 41–21 |
| 107 | September 19, 2026 | Hamilton, NY | Colgate | 20–7 |
Series: Colgate leads 53–51–3

== See also ==
- List of NCAA college football rivalry games
- List of most-played college football series in NCAA Division I
