= Arkansas Highway 172 =

State highway in Arkansas, United States

Highway 172

Route information
- Maintained by ArDOT

Section 1
- Length: 12.3 mi (19.8 km)
- West end: US 82 in Cairo
- East end: AR 7 in Smackover

Section 2
- Length: 7.0 mi (11.3 km)
- West end: US 167 near Artesian
- East end: AR 160 near Jersey

Section 3
- Length: 23.5 mi (37.8 km)
- West end: US 278 near Warren
- East end: US 425 south of Monticello

Location
- Country: United States
- State: Arkansas
- Counties: Union, Calhoun, Bradley, Drew

Highway system
- Arkansas Highway System; Interstate; US; State; Business; Spurs; Suffixed; Scenic; Heritage
← AR 171	→ AR 173

Arkansas Highway 172 (AR 172, Ark. 172, and Hwy. 172) is a designation for a state highway in Southern Arkansas. The first section begins at US Route 82 (US 82) in Cairo and ends at AR 7 in Smackover. The second section begins at US 167 near Artesian and ends at AR 160 just west of Jersey. The third, and longest, section begins at US 278 east of Warren and ends at US 425 south of Monticello. All three routes are very rural.

== Route description ==
=== Union County route ===
The western terminus for AR 172 is at US 82 near the unincorporated community of Cairo, or about 10 miles (16 km) west of El Dorado. The route heads northeast, intersecting the community of Lisbon along the way, before ending at AR 7 in Smackover. The route is about 12.3 miles (19.8 km) long and does not intersect any other highways.

=== Calhoun County route ===
The western terminus of AR 172 begins at US 167 near the unincorporated community of Artesian or about six miles (9.7 km) south of Hampton. The route heads east, before ending at AR 160 just northwest of Jersey about seven miles (11 km) later. The route does not intersect any other highways.

=== Bradley and Drew County Route ===
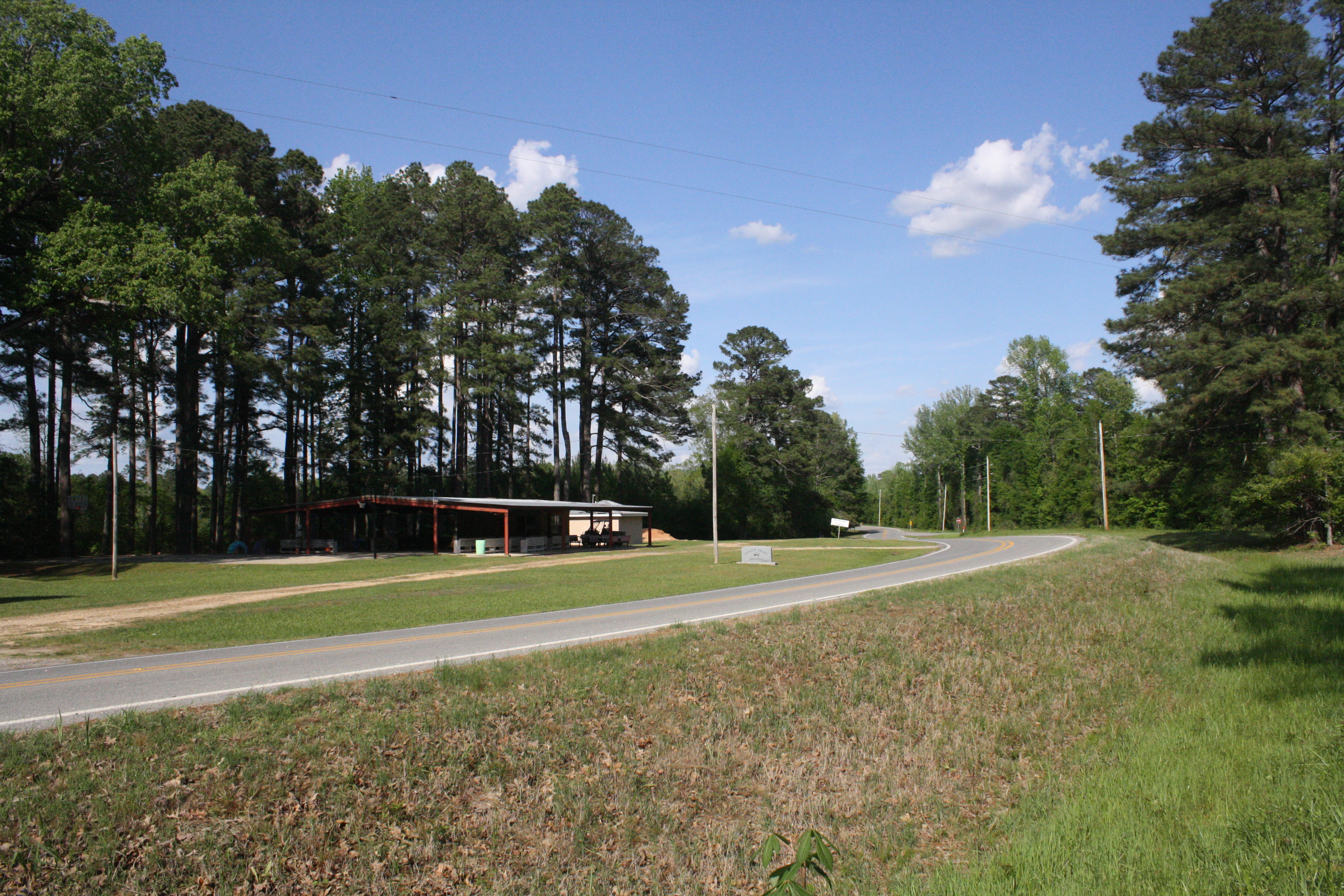
The Possum Valley Community Pavilion along a curve in Highway 172

The western terminus of AR 172 begins at US 278 east of Warren. The route heads south, before eventually making a large U-turn in southwestern Drew County. The route continues to head northeast, passing through the community of New Hope before eventually ending at U.S. Route 425 south of Monticello. The route is about 23.5 miles (37.8 km) long and does not intersect any other highways.

== Major intersections ==
County	Location	mi	km	Destinations	Notes
Union	Cairo	0.0	0.0	US 82 – El Dorado, Magnolia	Western terminus
Union	Smackover	12.3	19.8	AR 7 – El Dorado, Camden	Eastern terminus
Gap in route
Calhoun	Artesian	0.0	0.0	US 167 – Hampton, El Dorado, Calion	Western terminus
Calhoun	Jersey	7.0	11.3	AR 160 – Harrell, Jersey	Eastern terminus
Gap in route
Bradley		0.0	0.0	US 278 – Warren, Monticello	Western terminus
Drew	Monticello	23.5	37.8	US 425 – Monticello, Hamburg	Eastern terminus
1.000 mi = 1.609 km; 1.000 km = 0.621 mi
