= Warren High School (Arkansas) =

Location
- 803 North Walnut Street; Warren, Arkansas 71671; United States; 33°37′5″N 92°3′49″W

Information
- Motto: Academics Come First
- Founded: 1924 (102 years ago)
- Status: Temporally closed due to fire.
- School district: Warren School District
- NCES District ID: 050006
- Authority: Arkansas Department of Education (ADE)
- CEEB code: 042585
- NCES School ID: 050000601130
- Teaching staff: 45.96 (FTE)
- Grades: 9–12
- Enrollment: 480 (2023-2024)
- Student to teacher ratio: 11.04
- Education system: ADE Smart Core curriculum
- Classes offered: Regular; Career Focus; Advanced Placement
- Colors: Black and orange
- Song: Hail to the Warren High
- Athletics conference: 4A Region 8 (2012–14)
- Nickname: Jacks
- Team name: Warren Fightin' Lumberjacks
- Accreditation: ADE; AdvancED (1925–)
- Communities served: Warren
- Feeder schools: Warren Middle School (6–8)
- Affiliation: Arkansas Activities Association
- Website: wsdhs.warrensd.org

Warren High School is an accredited comprehensive public high school serving students in grades nine through twelve in Warren, Arkansas, United States. Established in 1901, the school supports families in Warren and nearby unincorporated communities in Bradley County and is the sole high school administered by the Warren School District. In 2022 Warren High School suffered a fire which lead to students having to switch to virtual while damage was assessed and the cause of the fire determined.

== Academics ==
The Warren High School is accredited by the Arkansas Department of Education (ADE) and has been accredited by AdvancED since 1925.

=== Curriculum ===
The assumed course of study follows the Smart Core curriculum developed the Arkansas Department of Education (ADE), which requires students to complete at least 22 credit units before graduation. Students engage in regular and career focus courses and exams and may select Advanced Placement (AP) coursework and exams that provide an opportunity to receive college credit. According to the student handbook, exceptional students may be awarded an Honors Graduates based on participation in 10 advanced courses, two credits in foreign language and a 3.5 grade point average (GPA).

== Athletics ==
The Warren High School mascot is the Fightin' Lumberjack with school colors of black and orange.

The Warren Lumberjacks are 4 time state champions in football. The Lumberjack football team won the Class AAA State Championship in 2001, 2002, and Class 4A Championship in 2014, and 2016. The Warren Lumberjack football program now has 18 conference championships. They were also the 2006, 2013, and 2017 Class 4A State Runner-up in Football. The Lumberjack baseball team were the Class AAA State Champions in 2005. Warren also holds state titles in basketball(1931), boys track(1994), girls tennis(1993), and girls track(1992 and 1994)and Soccer(2018). After the 2015 football season, the school district announced that synthetic turf would replace the natural grass field at Jim Hurley Jr Stadium. It was completed in the summer of 2016. With a traditional powerhouse football team and growing soccer program, Lumberjack field will be a premiere venue in southeast Arkansas. The Warren Soccer Jacks advanced to their first state championship match in 2017 finishing runner up. In 2018, they captured their first class 4A state soccer title. With the addition of the 2018 state title in soccer, that brings the Warren High School state title count to 18 state championships.

== Notable alumni ==
The following are notable people associated with Warren High School. If the person was a Warren High School student, the number in parentheses indicates the year of graduation; if the person was a faculty or staff member, that person's title and years of association are included.

- Treylon Burks, (2019)—Professional NFL football player
- Greg Childs, (2008)—Professional NFL football player
- Maud Crawford, (1911)—Attorney and famous 1957 missing persons case
- Chris Gragg, (2008)—Professional NFL football player
- Harvey Parnell, (ca. 1898)—Politician; 29th Governor of Arkansas (1928–1933)
- Rob Reep, (2006)—historian and filmmaker
- Jarius Wright, (2008)—Professional NFL football player
