= Senator Malone (disambiguation) =

George W. Malone (1890–1961) was a U.S. Senator from Nevada from 1947 to 1959. Senator Malone may also refer to:

- Charles E. Malone (1881–1945), Iowa State Senate
- James Malone (American politician) (born 1973/74), Pennsylvania State Senate
- Percy Malone (born 1942), Arkansas State Senate
- Vernon Malone (1931–2009), North Carolina State Senate

== See also ==
- Senator Maloney (disambiguation)
