= Warren station (Arkansas) =

- Warren and Ouachita Valley Railway Station
- U.S. National Register of Historic Places
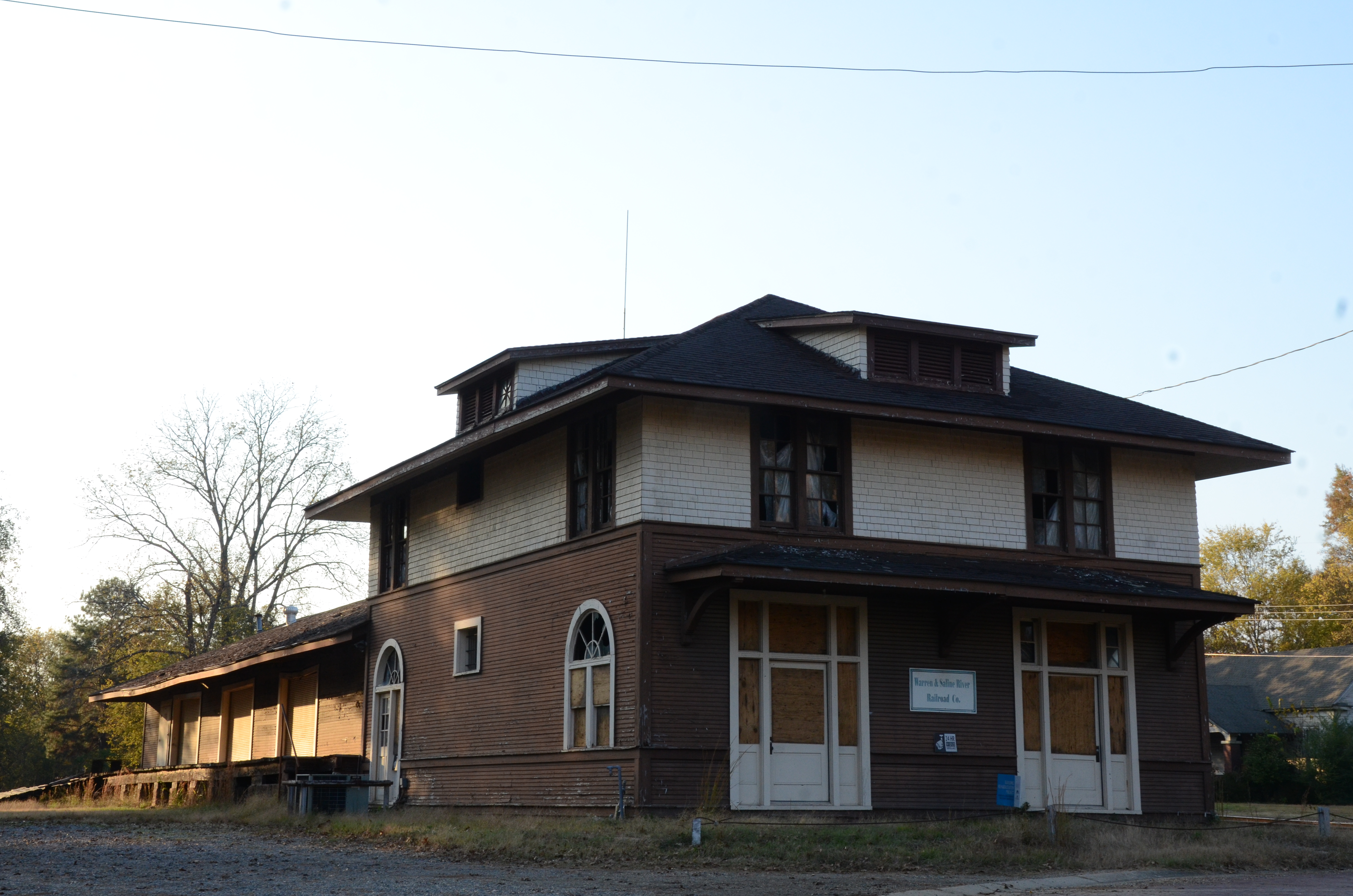

- Location within Arkansas Location within the United States
- Location: 325 W. Cedar St., Warren, Arkansas
- Coordinates: 33°36′55″N 92°4′5″W
- Area: less than one acre
- Built: 1909
- NRHP reference No.: 77000244
- Added to NRHP: August 3, 1977

The Warren and Ouachita Valley Railway Station is a historic railroad station at 325 West Cedar Street in Warren, Arkansas. It was built in 1909 by the Warren and Ouachita Valley Railroad, which in 1899 ran tracks from Warren to Banks, primarily to serve the lumber industry. The station is a two-story wood-frame structure with an attached single story warehouse. The main block has a hipped roof with shed dormers, and the warehouse roof is a gable roof that extends over loading areas. The building was extensively damaged by fire and rebuilt in 1911.

The station was listed on the National Register of Historic Places in 1977, at which time it was still used for railroad purposes.

== See also ==
- National Register of Historic Places listings in Bradley County, Arkansas
