= Arkansas Highway 173 =

Highway in the US state of Arkansas

Highway 173

Route information
- Maintained by ArDOT
- Length: 6.66 mi (10.72 km)
- Existed: July 18, 1985–present

Major junctions
- South end: Overflow National Wildlife Refuge
- North end: US 165 in Wilmot

Location
- Country: United States
- State: Arkansas
- Counties: Ashley

Highway system
- Arkansas Highway System; Interstate; US; State; Business; Spurs; Suffixed; Scenic; Heritage
← AR 172	→ AR 174

Highway 173 (AR 173, Ark. 173, and Hwy. 173) is a north–south state highway in Southeast Arkansas. The route begins at the Overflow National Wildlife Refuge (NWR) and runs north to U.S. Route 165 in Wilmot. The route is maintained by the Arkansas Department of Transportation (ArDOT).

== Route description ==
Highway 173 begins at Overflow NWR in southeastern Ashley County just over 2.5 miles (4.0 km) north of the Louisiana state line in a region known as the Lower Arkansas Delta. The area is known for flat, agricultural land with swamps, bayous and small towns dotting the landscape. The highway runs northeast, crossing Bayou Bartholomew before terminating at US 165 along then north edge of Wilmot.

== History ==
The highway was created from a former alignment of Highway 52 at the request of the county judge on July 18, 1985.

== Major intersections ==
The entire route is in Ashley County.

Location	mi	km	Destinations	Notes
Overflow NWR	0.00	0.00	Begin state maintenance	Southern terminus
Wilmot	6.66	10.72	US 165 (Main Street)	Northern terminus
1.000 mi = 1.609 km; 1.000 km = 0.621 mi
