= Sheilla Lampkin =

American politician

Member of the Arkansas House of Representatives from the 9th district
- In office January 14, 2013 – July 23, 2016
- Preceded by: Eddie Cheatham
- Succeeded by: LeAnne Burch

Member of the Arkansas House of Representatives from the 10th district
- In office January 2011 – January 14, 2013
- Preceded by: Allen Maxwell
- Succeeded by: Mike Holcomb

Personal details
- Born: August 23, 1945 Rohwer, Arkansas
- Died: July 23, 2016 (aged 70) Little Rock, Arkansas
- Party: Democratic
- Spouse: Damon Ray Lampkin
- Education: University of Arkansas at Monticello; University of Arkansas
- Website: sheillalampkin.com

Sheilla Joyce Ezelle Lampkin (August 23, 1945 – July 23, 2016) was an American politician and a Democratic Party member of the Arkansas House of Representatives representing District 9 from January 14, 2013, until her death on July 23, 2016. Lampkin served consecutively from January 2011 until January 2013 in the District 10 seat.

== Education ==
Lampkin graduated from the University of Arkansas at Monticello and earned her master's degree from the University of Arkansas.

== Elections ==
- 2012 Redistricted to District 9, and with Representative Eddie Cheatham running for Arkansas Senate, Lampkin was challenged in the May 22, 2012 Democratic Primary, winning with 3,456 votes (80.6%) and won the November 6, 2012 General election with 5,815 votes (57.4%) against Republican nominee Gary Meggs.
- 2010 When District 10 Representative Allen Maxwell left the Legislature and left the seat open, Lampkin placed first in the four-way May 18, 2010 Democratic Primary with 1,449 votes (32.0%), won the June 8 runoff election with 1,849 votes (51.6%), and won the November 2, 2010 General election with 4,711 votes (67.3%) against Independent candidate Weldon Wynn.
