= L'Aigle Creek =

L’Aigle Creek is a waterway in Bradley County, Arkansas. It is 44.2 miles long. It flows into the Saline River, which is a tributary of the Ouachita River.

The watershed of the creek covers a large portion of Bradley County, Arkansas. L’Aigle Creek meets the EPA water quality standards.

The Ouachita River flows through the Felsenthal National Wildlife Refuge. The Saline River and the L’Aigle Creek flow within the boundaries of the refuge. The Felsenthal National Wildlife Refuge is subject to flooding in the spring. Heavy rain can cause the water levels in the creek and river to rise. This flooding can be beneficial for some species. Flooding can be a challenge for wildlife and people living in the area.

L'Aigle is French for "the eagle."

== French, German, Estonian names of creeks, lakes, river landings and places ==
- L'Aigles Creek, Aigle "Eagle Creek", Eagle Lake.
- Bogalusa. A place on the Saline River near the Ouachita River (a different place with the same name is Bogalusa, Louisiana).
- Charivari Creek, south of Hilo (a French folk custom in which the community gave a noisy, discordant mock serenade, also pounding on pots and pans, at the home of newlyweds. )
- Felsenthal a Germanic word meaning "hills and valleys" or "rocky valleys." The Mississippi embayment left the Ouachita River flows to the east, southeast until it turned south near Felsenthal.
- Moreau Bayou de Moreau (or Moro Creek, Moro Bay) Moreau is a French surname.
- Pereogeethe Lake. Pereo (Latin: Disappearance, death, loss.) Geethe (Estonian: presently a female name)
