= Warren School District =

School district in Arkansas, United States

Address
- 408 Cherry Street Warren, Arkansas, 71671; United States

District information
- Type: Public
- Grades: K–12
- NCES District ID: 0500006

Students and staff
- Students: 1,529
- Teachers: 117.77 (FTE)
- Staff: 127.95 (FTE)
- Student–teacher ratio: 12.98

Other information
- Website: www.warrensd.org

Warren School District is a public school district based in Warren, Arkansas, United States. The school district provides early childhood, elementary and secondary education from its four schools in Bradley County, Arkansas.

It includes Warren and Banks.

== History ==
Banks School District consolidated into Warren School District on July 1, 1985.

== Schools ==
- Warren High School
- Warren Middle School
- Thomas C. Brunson Elementary School (Fourth through Fifth Grade)
- Eastside Elementary School (Kindergarten through Third Grade)
- Warren ABC Preschool
