= Moreau =

Moreau may refer to:

== People ==
- Moreau (surname)

== Places ==
- Moreau, New York
- Moreau River (Missouri River tributary)
- Moreau River (South Dakota)
- Moreau Catholic High School

== Music ==
- An alternate name for the band Cousteau, used for the album Nova Scotia in the United States for legal reasons

== In fiction ==
- Dr. Moreau, the anti villain of The Island of Dr. Moreau, an 1896 science fiction novel by H. G. Wells, and various film adaptations
- Andre-Louis Moreau, the hero of Scaramouche, a historical novel by Rafael Sabatini.
- Moreau series of novels by S. Andrew Swann
- Jeff "Joker" Moreau, flight lieutenant in the video game Mass Effect
- Moreau, half-human-half-animal race in the role-playing game d20 Modern
- Damien Moreau, villain in season 3 of the television show Leverage
