= Hugh Bradley =

Hugh Bradley may refer to:

- Hugh Bradley (Arkansas settler) (1783–1854), early settler of South Arkansas
- Hugh Bradley (baseball) (1885–1949), Major League Baseball player
