= Chris Gragg =

American football player and coach (born 1990)

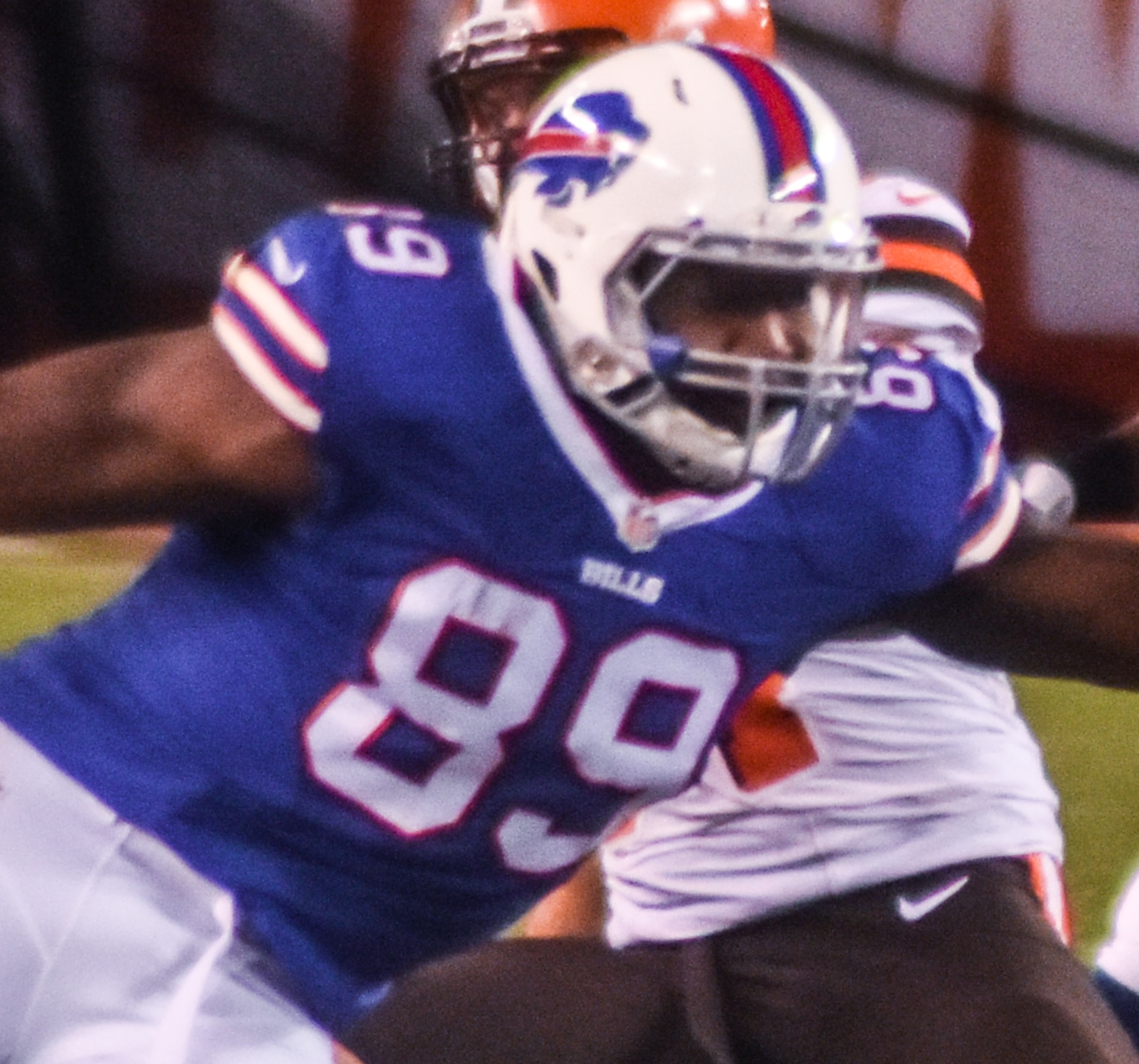
- Gragg with the Buffalo Bills in 2015

No. 89
- Position: Tight end

Personal information
- Born: June 30, 1990 (age 36); Pine Bluff, Arkansas, U.S.
- Listed height: 6 ft 3 in (1.91 m)
- Listed weight: 244 lb (111 kg)

Career information
- High school: Warren (Warren, Arkansas)
- College: Arkansas
- NFL draft: 2013: 7th round, 222nd overall pick

Career history

Playing
- Buffalo Bills (2013–2016); New York Jets (2017)*
- * Offseason or practice squad member only

Coaching
- Memphis (GA/WR) (2020)

Career NFL statistics
- Receptions: 24
- Receiving yards: 251
- Receiving touchdowns: 2
- Stats at Pro Football Reference

Christopher Le'Edward Gragg (born June 30, 1990) is an American former professional football player who was a tight end for three seasons with the Buffalo Bills of the National Football League (NFL). Born in Pine Bluff, Arkansas, Gragg played college football for the Arkansas Razorbacks and was selected by the Bills in the seventh round of the 2013 NFL draft.

Gragg played as a wide receiver for Warren High School, and converted to a tight end after his freshman season at the University of Arkansas. In his sophomore and junior seasons for the Razorbacks, the team made appearances in Bowl Championship Series games and defeated the Kansas State Wildcats in the 2012 Cotton Bowl Classic. A knee injury caused Gragg to miss eight games his senior season as Arkansas finished with a losing record. Gragg participated in the NFL Scouting Combine, an evaluative competition among prospective NFL players, and topped several statistics among the tight ends in attendance; in the following draft, the Bills chose him with the 222nd overall selection.

Gragg made his NFL debut for Buffalo on October 13, 2013, and played in nine regular-season games during the 2013 NFL season. He played in ten games in 2014 and thirteen games in 2015 before missing the 2016 season due to injury. He signed with the New York Jets in 2017, but did not play any regular-season games for the team after a preseason injury. Gragg indicated he was retired from the NFL as of December 2019 and, in 2020, worked as an assistant coach for the Memphis Tigers football team.

== Early life ==
Christopher Le'Edward Gragg was born on June 30, 1990, in Pine Bluff, Arkansas, to Tenita and Kelvin Gragg, both of whom worked as educators. Kelvin coached the Warren High School football team, and Chris served as the team's water boy until he was in junior high school. Gragg played football as a wide receiver for Warren alongside future NFL players Jarius Wright and Greg Childs. During his senior year, Gragg accumulated 420 receiving yards and caught 8 touchdowns. (Note: Otis Kirk of Rivals.com credits Gragg with only 409 receiving yards in his senior year.) Recruiting website Rivals.com evaluated him as a 2-star prospect on a 1–5 star scale and ranked Gragg as the 15th best player in Arkansas at his position, while Scout.com ranked him as the 148th best receiver in the nation. In July 2007, Gragg committed to (agreed to attend and play for) the University of Arkansas, as did three other players from Warren.

== College career ==
In his freshman season, Gragg played in all twelve of the Arkansas Razorbacks' games as the team finished with a 5–7 win–loss record. During the second game of the season, against the Louisiana–Monroe Warhawks, Gragg caught a 25-yard pass from quarterback Casey Dick on fourth down and one to continue a drive that ended with a game-winning touchdown. The catch was Gragg's only reception in 2008. In spring 2009, Gragg converted from a wide receiver into a tight end, and was listed as the number-three tight end on the Razorbacks' depth chart. He was given a medical redshirt and did not play during the 2009 season after he dislocated his ankle in a preseason practice.

In September 2010, Gragg was listed as the number three tight end on the Razorbacks' depth chart. When Arkansas faced the Georgia Bulldogs on September 18, 2010, Gragg caught a touchdown from a 57-yard pass for his first reception of the year. The 2010 Arkansas Razorbacks ended the year with a 10–3 record, and were invited to play in the Sugar Bowl against the Ohio State Buckeyes, a game that Arkansas lost 31–26. Gragg made one catch for 16 yards in the contest; he finished the year with 8 receptions for 171 yards and two touchdowns.

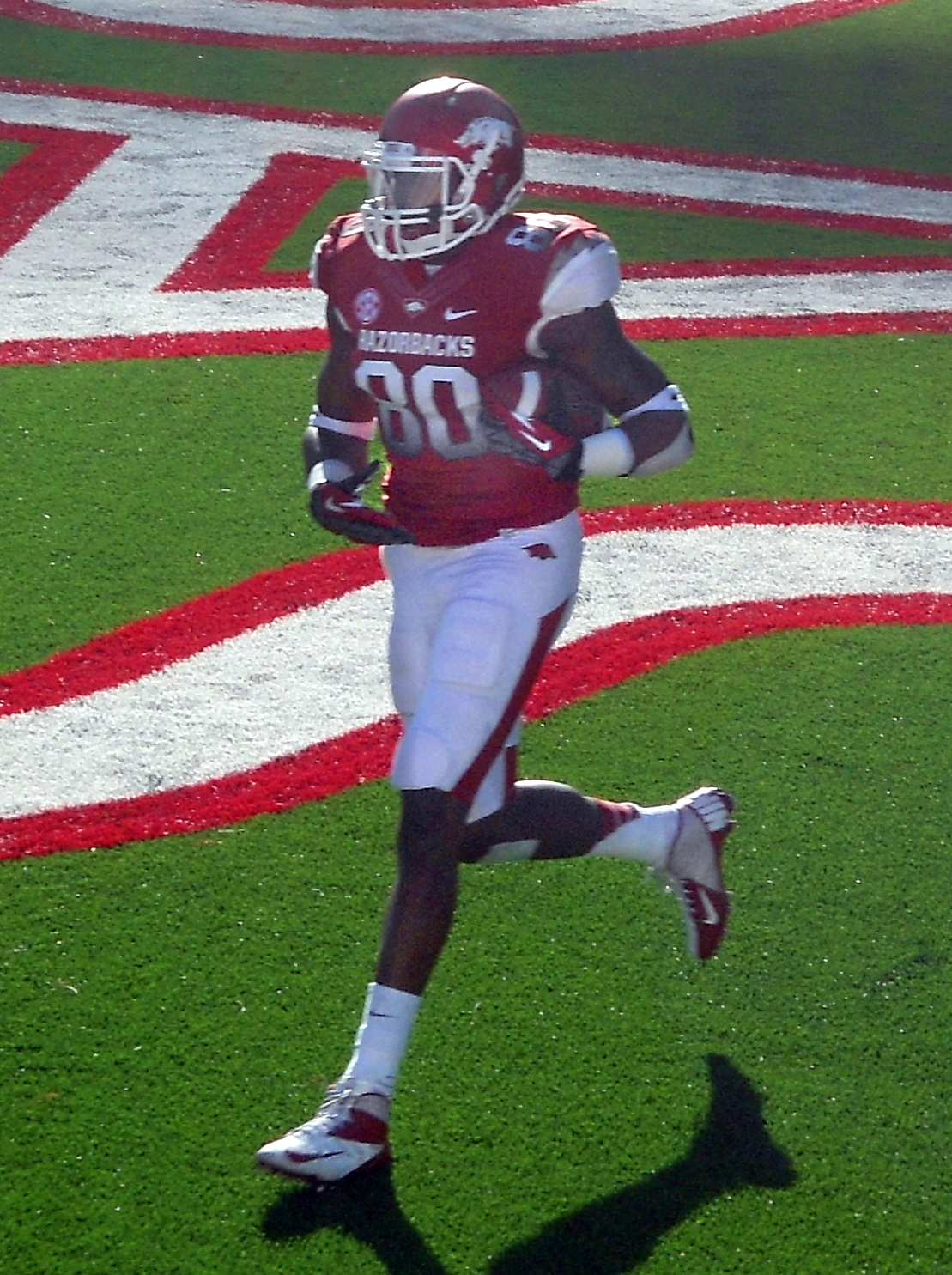
Gragg in 2012 with Arkansas

Prior to the 2011 season, Gragg replaced D. J. Williams, a first-string tight end who graduated in 2010. In the Razorbacks' eleventh game of the season, Gragg caught 8 passes for 119 yards, both single-game career highs, as the team defeated the Mississippi State Bulldogs and moved to a 10–1 record. After the game, the Bowl Championship Series (BCS) system, which averaged team positions in the Harris Interactive College Football Poll, the Coaches' Poll, and six computer rankings to list teams by their combined average position, ranked Arkansas as the third-best team in the nation behind the Louisiana State University Tigers and the Alabama Crimson Tide. After a loss to the Tigers on November 25, the Razorbacks fell out of contention for the BCS National Championship Game, a game in which the top two teams in the BCS poll played at the end of the regular season. Arkansas finished the year ranked sixth in BCS standings and were invited to play in the 2012 Cotton Bowl Classic, where they defeated the Kansas State Wildcats 29–16: with the victory, Arkansas tied a team record for most wins in a season. Over the season, Gragg caught 41 receptions, third most on the team, for 518 yards and two touchdowns.

In July 2012, Gragg was listed as a preseason nominee for the John Mackey Award, a recognition presented annually by the Nassau County Sports Commission to the best tight end in college football, and was voted to the second team of the Coaches Preseason All-Southeastern Conference (SEC) squad, an honorific roster composed of the second-best players in the SEC. In July, ESPN writers Edward Aschoff and Chris Low ranked Gragg as the best tight end in the conference. In Arkansas' season opener against the Jacksonville State Gamecocks, Gragg accumulated 110 yards and two touchdowns over 7 catches, a performance for which he earned the John Mackey Tight End of the Week award. On September 9, Gragg suffered a bone bruise in his knee against the Rutgers Scarlet Knights which caused him to miss the next three games; upon return, Gragg reaggravated the injury and missed the remainder of the season's matches. He finished his final season at Arkansas with 22 receptions for 289 yards and three touchdowns, while the team ended with a 4–8 record. After his senior year, Gragg participated in the NFL Scouting Combine, an evaluative competition among prospective NFL players, where he ran the fastest 40-yard dash time, the third-fastest 3 cone drill, had the longest broad jump, and the highest vertical jump among tight ends in attendance.

== Professional career ==
Pre-draft measurables
Height	Weight	Arm length	Hand span	40-yard dash	10-yard split	20-yard split	20-yard shuttle	Three-cone drill	Vertical jump	Broad jump	Bench press
6 ft 2 3/4 in (1.90 m)	244 lb (111 kg)	33 5/8 in (0.85 m)	9 in (0.23 m)	4.50 s	1.56 s	2.61 s	4.35 s	7.08 s	37.5 in (0.95 m)	10 ft 5 in (3.18 m)	18 reps

=== Buffalo Bills ===
The Buffalo Bills drafted Gragg in the seventh round of the 2013 NFL draft, with the 222nd overall selection, a slot they obtained from a trade with the St. Louis Rams. Gragg signed a contract with the Bills in May 2013. In preseason practice, Gragg was one of five tight ends on the Buffalo team. When the Bills cut their roster to meet the NFL's 2013 53-man limit by August 31, Gragg made the team. In September 2013, ESPN columnist Mike Rodak gave the Bills a C grade in tight end depth on an A–F scale and said Gragg "would be in the bottom 10 percent of NFL starters at [the position]". Gragg made his regular-season NFL debut on October 13 against the Cincinnati Bengals, and caught his first career reception and touchdown against the Pittsburgh Steelers four games later. When Buffalo faced the Tampa Bay Buccaneers on December 8, Gragg started a game for the first time during the regular season. By the end of 2013, Gragg caught 5 receptions for 53 yards and a touchdown in nine career games played. Collectively, the Bills finished last in the AFC East with a 6–10 record.

Prior to the Bills' 2014 training camp, Rodak gave Gragg a 45% chance to make Buffalo's 53-man roster: Rodak described him as "the most athletic tight end" with the Bills, but also wrote that "there might not be a spot for Gragg" with tight ends Tony Moeaki, Scott Chandler, and Lee Smith on the team. Gragg made Buffalo's 53-man roster. In the fourth quarter of the Bills' regular-season October 5 matchup against the Detroit Lions, Gragg caught a touchdown pass that, with an added two-point conversion, tied the game; Buffalo won the contest, 17–14, and moved to a 3–2 record. When he attempted to catch a low-thrown pass in the second half of a game against the New York Jets on November 24, Gragg injured his right knee, which caused him to miss the remainder of the Bills' season. During 2014, over the ten games in which he played, Gragg accumulated 7 receptions for 48 yards and a touchdown as Buffalo finished with a 9–7 record, second in the AFC East behind the New England Patriots. Gragg underwent surgery for his knee in January 2015.

In the 2015 preseason, Gragg finished with 8 receptions for 128 yards and a touchdown; during the 2015 regular season, Gragg set career highs in games played, with 13, receptions, with 12, and receiving yards, with 150, as the Bills finished 8–8 and missed the playoffs. His 150 receiving yards and 12 receptions were second most among Bills tight ends. In an August 2016 preseason game against the Indianapolis Colts, Gragg blocked a punt on the Colts' second drive, which resulted in a safety, and scored a touchdown on a 19-yard pass from EJ Manuel on the next drive. In a summary of the game, Zac Jackson, a writer for Profootballtalk.com, said Gragg "[had] been a valuable utility man for the Bills over the last three seasons", and that he "[seemed] on his way to playing a similar role" for Buffalo that season. On August 26, 2016, Gragg suffered a torn ACL in a preseason game against the Washington Redskins that sidelined him for the entire 2016 season.

=== Later career ===
Gragg became a free agent in March 2017. According to Gragg, he visited with the Jacksonville Jaguars on March 15, but did not sign with the team. On July 28, 2017, Gragg signed with the Jets; to make room for Gragg, the Jets waived wide receiver K. D. Cannon. In a preseason game against the Philadelphia Eagles, Gragg suffered an ankle injury after a 20-yard catch; he was placed on the Jets' injured reserve list on September 1, 2017. In four preseason games with the Jets, Gragg totaled 6 receptions for 64 yards and no touchdowns. He did not play in any regular-season games for the Jets.

In March 2019, Gragg worked out for the San Francisco 49ers, though he did not sign with the team.

== Post-NFL career and personal life ==
On his Twitter account, Gragg indicated that he was retired from the NFL as of December 2019. In 2020, Gragg worked as a graduate assistant coach for wide receivers with the Memphis Tigers football team.

Gragg has a brother, Will, who played college football for Arkansas and for the University of Pittsburgh Panthers as a tight end. Chris has a degree in sports management from the University of Arkansas.
