= List of lakes of Bradley County, Arkansas =

There are at least 24 named lakes and reservoirs in Bradley County, Arkansas.

== Lakes ==
- Bend Lake, 33°12′53″N 092°10′18″W, el. 75 feet (23 m)
- Bilbo Lake, 33°18′02″N 092°18′52″W, el. 72 feet (22 m)
- Black Lake, 33°21′09″N 091°58′25″W, el. 89 feet (27 m)
- Black Lake, 33°15′48″N 092°03′12″W, el. 75 feet (23 m)
- Buck Lake, 33°13′28″N 092°10′56″W, el. 75 feet (23 m)
- Eagle Lake, 33°14′21″N 092°09′46″W, el. 75 feet (23 m)
- Frank Lake, 33°13′01″N 092°09′00″W, el. 75 feet (23 m)
- Gar Lake, 33°16′57″N 092°14′20″W, el. 75 feet (23 m)
- Green Lake, 33°17′21″N 092°16′26″W, el. 72 feet (22 m)
- Middle Lake, 33°13′43″N 092°09′24″W, el. 72 feet (22 m)
- Moro Bay, 33°18′15″N 092°21′16″W, el. 79 feet (24 m)
- Mud Lake, 33°14′02″N 092°13′36″W, el. 69 feet (21 m)
- Pereogeethe Lake, 33°14′23″N 092°12′26″W, el. 62 feet (19 m)
- Pine Prairie Bay, 33°15′25″N 092°14′30″W, el. 62 feet (19 m)
- Raymond Lake, 33°17′47″N 092°20′04″W, el. 72 feet (22 m)
- Scott Water, 33°41′51″N 092°19′41″W, el. 151 feet (46 m)
- Straight Lake, 33°13′21″N 092°10′32″W, el. 72 feet (22 m)
- White Oak Lake, 33°16′14″N 092°09′45″W, el. 72 feet (22 m)

== Reservoirs ==
- Atkins Pond, 33°35′56″N 092°02′48″W, el. 164 feet (50 m)
- Bradley County Lake, 33°37′24″N 092°05′46″W, el. 230 feet (70 m)
- Fullerton Lake, 33°38′21″N 092°01′51″W, el. 135 feet (41 m)
- Reeps Lake, 33°36′14″N 092°02′35″W, el. 144 feet (44 m)
- Scott Lake, 33°38′09″N 092°03′10″W, el. 161 feet (49 m)
- Warren Country Club Lake, 33°34′11″N 092°04′01″W, el. 177 feet (54 m)

== See also ==
- List of lakes in Arkansas
