= Reep =

Reep may refer to:

- Charles Reep, English soccer analyst and statistician
- Jon Reep, American comedian and actor
- Rob Reep, American historian, filmmaker and narrator
- Reep Daggle, DC Comics character
- The Review of Environmental Economics and Policy (REEP), a peer-reviewed journal of environmental economics
