= Treylon Burks =

American football player (born 2000)

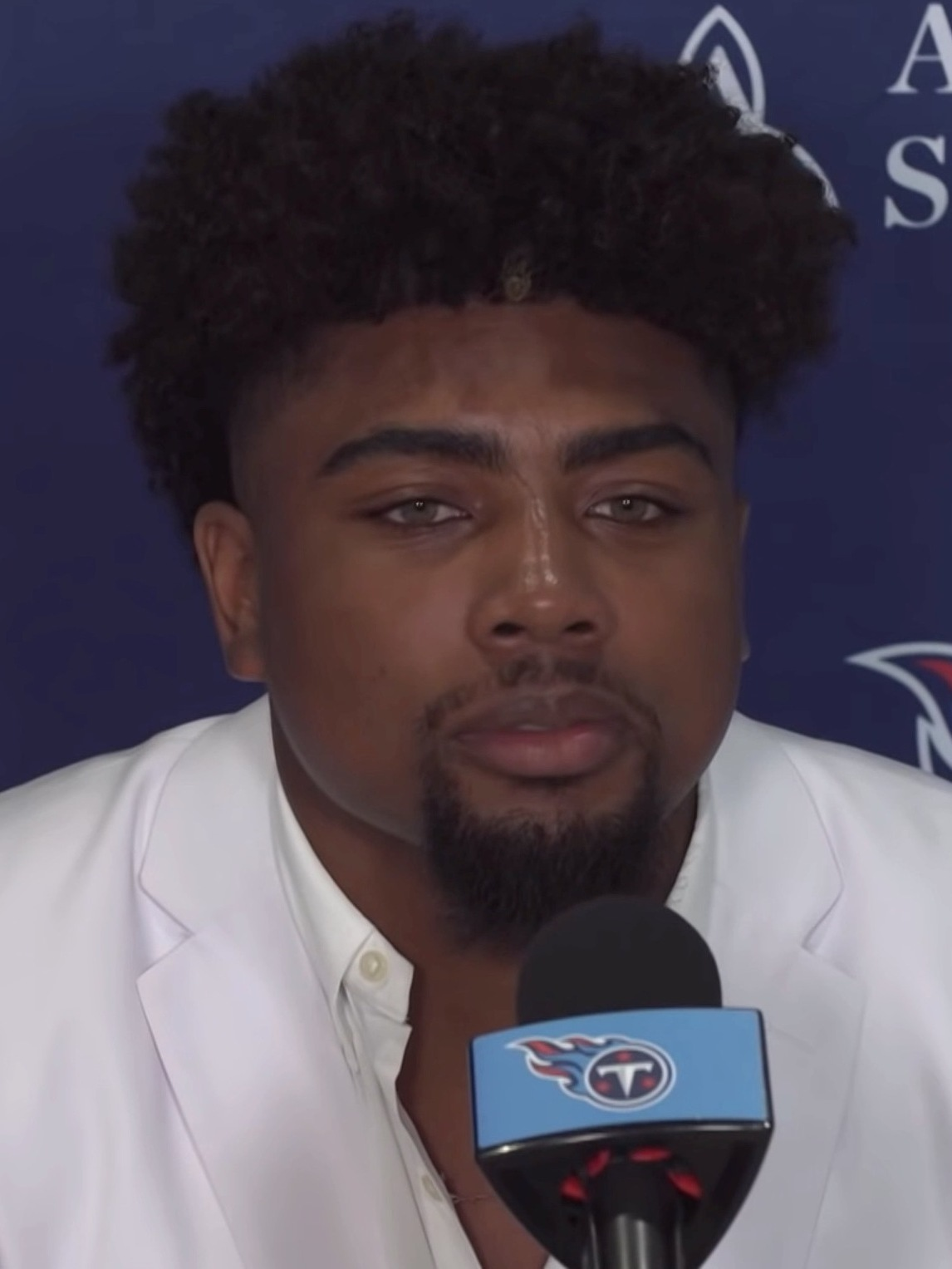
- Burks with the Tennessee Titans in 2022

No. 13 – Washington Commanders
- Position: Wide receiver
- Roster status: Active

Personal information
- Born: March 23, 2000 (age 26); Flint, Michigan, U.S.
- Listed height: 6 ft 2 in (1.88 m)
- Listed weight: 225 lb (102 kg)

Career information
- High school: Warren (Warren, Arkansas)
- College: Arkansas (2019–2021)
- NFL draft: 2022: 1st round, 18th overall pick

Career history
- Tennessee Titans (2022–2025); Washington Commanders (2025–present)

Awards and highlights
- First-team All-SEC (2021); 2× Second-team All-SEC (2019, 2020); SEC All-Freshman Team (2019)

Career NFL statistics as of Week 10, 2026
- Receptions: 77
- Receiving yards: 1,089
- Receiving touchdowns: 4
- Stats at Pro Football Reference

Treylon Burks (born March 23, 2000) is an American professional football wide receiver for the Washington Commanders of the National Football League (NFL). He played college football for the Arkansas Razorbacks and was selected by the Tennessee Titans in the first round of the 2022 NFL draft.

== Early life ==
Burks was born on March 23, 2000, in Flint, Michigan and grew up in Warren, Arkansas. He attended Warren High School, where he played wide receiver for their football team and totaled 151 receptions for 3,403 yards and 43 touchdowns. Burks missed most of his senior season in 2018 after suffering a torn ACL. On July 30, 2018, he committed to the University of Arkansas to play college football. Burks was a four-star recruit and was the 103rd ranked recruit in the nation, and the number one recruit in Arkansas. He also played basketball and baseball in high school.

== College career ==
As a true freshman at Arkansas in 2019, Burks started nine of 11 games and recorded 29 receptions for 475 yards. He was named 2nd Team All-SEC as a return specialist by the coaches and was placed on the SEC All-Freshman team.

As a sophomore in 2020, Burks became Arkansas' number one receiver. He finished the season with 51 receptions for 820 yards and seven touchdowns despite starting only eight games. Burks was named 2nd Team All-SEC by the AP and Coaches.

As a junior in 2021, Burks started all 12 games and finished with 66 receptions for 1,104 yards and 11 touchdowns, becoming only the fourth player in program history with over 1,000 yards receiving in a single season. He also had 14 carries for 112 yards and a touchdown. Burks was named 1st Team All-SEC by the AP and the Coaches.

Burks decided to forgo participation in the Outback Bowl and also skip his senior season, declaring his intentions to enter the 2022 NFL draft.

== Professional career ==
Pre-draft measurables
Height	Weight	Arm length	Hand span	Wingspan	40-yard dash	10-yard split	20-yard split	20-yard shuttle	Three-cone drill	Vertical jump	Broad jump	Bench press
6 ft 2 in (1.88 m)	225 lb (102 kg)	33 1/2 in (0.85 m)	9 7/8 in (0.25 m)	6 ft 7 1/8 in (2.01 m)	4.55 s	1.54 s	2.65 s	4.40 s	7.28 s	35.5 in (0.90 m)	10 ft 2 in (3.10 m)	12 reps
All values from NFL Combine/Pro Day

=== Tennessee Titans ===
==== 2022 season ====
Burks was drafted 18th overall by the Tennessee Titans in 2022. To obtain the pick from the Philadelphia Eagles, the Titans traded away receiver A. J. Brown and also received a third-round pick, a move that was highly criticized.

Burks made his NFL debut in the season opener against the New York Giants and finished the narrow 21–20 loss with three receptions for 55 yards. Three weeks later against the Indianapolis Colts, Burks suffered turf toe and was placed on injured reserve on October 8, 2022. He was activated from injured reserve on November 12.

During a Week 11 27–17 road victory over the Green Bay Packers on Thursday Night Football, Burks was the leading receiver with seven receptions for 111 yards. In the next game against the Cincinnati Bengals, he had four receptions for 70 yards and scored his first NFL touchdown on a fumble recovery in the end zone during the 20–16 loss. The following week against the Eagles, Burks scored his first professional receiving touchdown on a 25-yard reception in the 35–10 road loss.

Burks finished his rookie year with 33 receptions for 444 yards and a touchdown to go along with four carries for 47 yards as well as a touchdown on a fumble recovery in 11 games and six starts.

==== 2023 season ====
During a joint practice with the Minnesota Vikings on August 17, 2023, Burks caught a deep pass and landed on his knee, causing an LCL sprain. During Week 2 against the Los Angeles Chargers, Burks had three receptions for 76 yards in the 27–24 overtime victory. However, he missed Weeks 4 and 5 due to the injury.

Burks finished his second professional season with 16 receptions for 221 yards and five carries for 18 yards in 11 games and nine starts.

==== 2024 season ====
Burks entered the 2024 season behind DeAndre Hopkins, Calvin Ridley, and Tyler Boyd on the depth chart.

On October 18, 2024, Burks was ruled out ahead of Week 7 matchup against the Buffalo Bills after suffering a knee injury in practice, and he was placed on injured reserve the following day. On December 4, head coach Brian Callahan announced that Burks underwent season-ending surgery to repair his ACL.

Burks finished the 2024 season with four receptions for 34 yards in five games and two starts.

==== 2025 season ====
On May 1, 2025, the Titans declined the fifth-year option of Burks' contract, making him a free agent in 2026.

On July 26, Burks suffered a fractured collarbone in training camp after making a diving one-handed catch. Two days later, he was placed on injured reserve after clearing waivers. On October 7, Burks was waived by the Titans.

=== Washington Commanders ===
==== 2025 season ====
Burks signed with the Washington Commanders' practice squad on October 17, 2025. He was promoted to the active roster for the Week 9 matchup against the Seattle Seahawks and finished the 38–14 loss with a 14-yard reception. On November 5, the Commanders signed Burks to the active roster following a season-ending injury to Luke McCaffrey. Five days later, he underwent surgery to repair a finger that he broke in the Week 10 44–22 loss to the Detroit Lions.

During a narrow Week 13 27–26 overtime loss to the Denver Broncos, Burks returned from injury and had a one-handed touchdown reception to tie the game in the third quarter. The catch quickly gained attention on social media for its likeness to Odell Beckham Jr.'s notable one-handed catch, with Beckham Jr. himself acknowledging the resemblance between the two catches.

Burks finished the 2025 season with 10 receptions for 130 yards and a touchdown in eight games and three starts.

==== 2026 season ====
On March 12, 2026, Burks re-signed with the Commanders on a one-year contract.

During Week 3 against the Seahawks, Burks recorded two receptions for 13 yards and his first touchdown of the season in the narrow 33–31 victory. In the next game against the Colts in London, Burks had a 47-yard touchdown reception during the 30–13 loss.

== Career statistics ==
Legend
**Bold**	Career high

=== NFL ===
==== Regular season ====
Year	Team	Games		Receiving					Rushing					Fumbles			
Year	Team	GP	GS	Rec	Yds	Avg	Lng	TD	Att	Yds	Avg	Lng	TD	Fum	Lost	FR	TD
2022	TEN	11	6	**33**	**444**	13.5	51	1	4	**47**	**11.8**	**20**	0	0	0	**1**	**1**
2023	TEN	11	9	16	221	13.8	**70**	0	**5**	18	3.6	9	0	0	0	0	0
2024	TEN	5	2	4	34	8.5	13	0	2	1	0.5	6	0	0	0	0	0
2025	WAS	8	3	10	130	13.0	37	1	0	0	0.0	0	0	0	0	0	0
2026	WAS	7	3	14	260	**18.6**	53	**2**	0	0	0.0	0	0	0	0	0	0
Career		41	23	77	1089	14.1	70	4	11	66	6.0	20	0	0	0	1	1

=== College ===
Season	GP	Receiving			Rushing		
Season	GP	Rec	Yds	TD	Att	Yds	TD
2019	11	29	475	0	9	35	0
2020	8	51	820	7	**15**	75	0
2021	**12**	**66**	**1,104**	**11**	14	**112**	**1**
Career	31	146	2,399	18	38	222	1

== Personal life ==
Burks is an avid hog hunter. He has asthma.
