= Sumpter, Arkansas =

Community in Arkansas, US

Coordinates: 33°29′08″N 92°02′57″W

Sumter is a community in Bradley County, Arkansas, United States. It is situated at 243 feet (74 metres) above mean sea level. Sumpter is one of the many small towns in Bradley County that has decayed to nearly nothing since the collapse of the logging industry in the early 1930s. Some of the only businesses around the decayed community is a chicken business of the name of “Spring Branch Farms LLC”.The name of the town is from either Thomas Sumter who served in the continental army and was in the U.S. senate or the name could also be from Ft. Sumter, the fort that Confederate forces fired on in April 1861, starting the American Civil War. And the town also has a fire department in downtown Sumter.
