= Senator Maloney (disambiguation) =

Francis T. Maloney (1894–1945) was a U.S. Senator from Connecticut from 1935 to 1945. Senator Maloney may also refer to:

- Edward Maloney (born 1946), Illinois State Senate
- James H. Maloney (born 1948), Connecticut State Senate
- Thomas A. Maloney (1889–1986), California State Senate

== See also ==
- Senator Malone (disambiguation)
