= Bradley County, Arkansas =

County in Arkansas, United States

- County
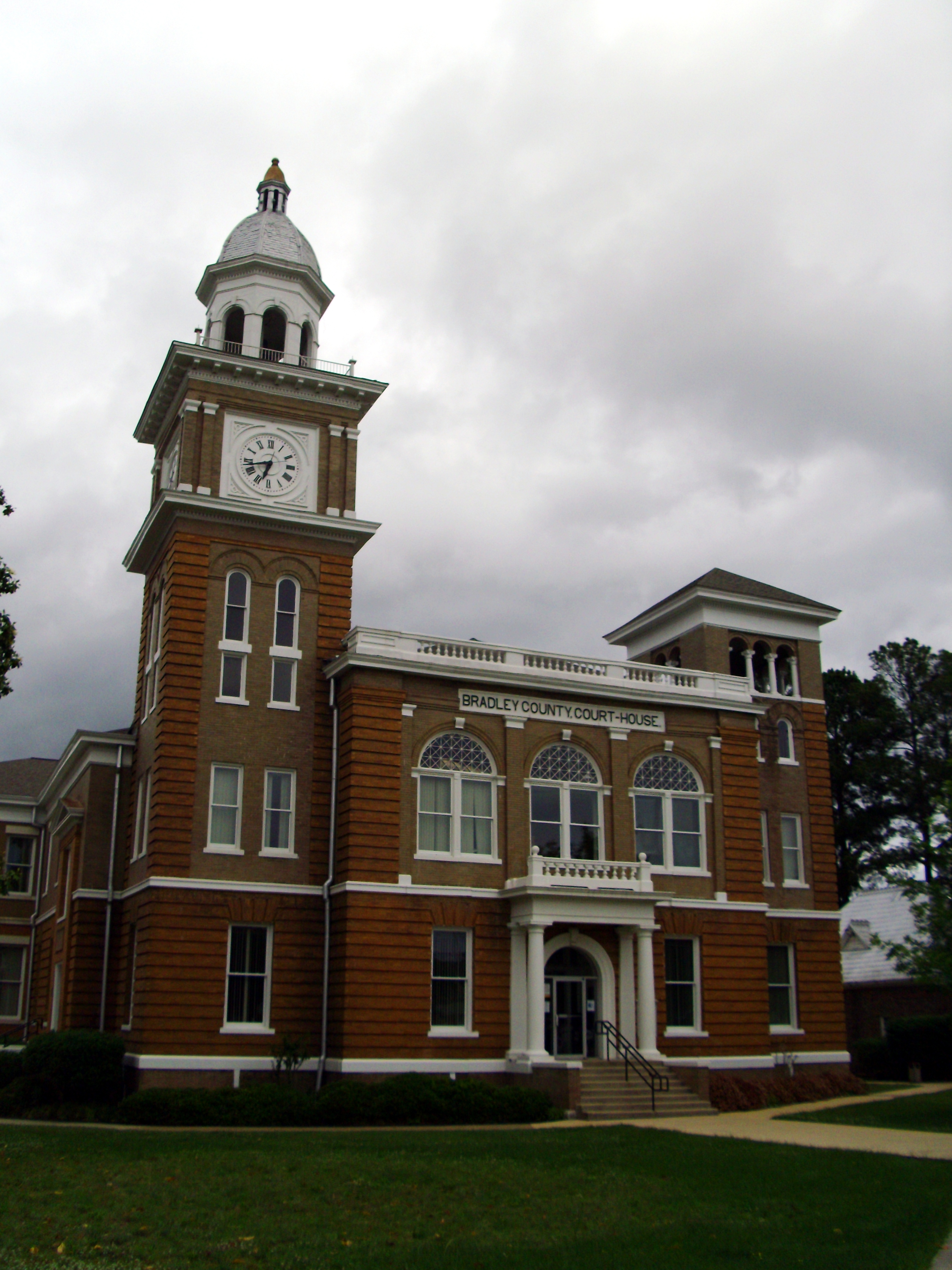
- Bradley County Courthouse

- Location within the U.S. state of Arkansas
- Coordinates: 33°29′39″N 92°08′42″W
- Country: United States
- State: Arkansas
- Founded: December 18, 1840
- Named for: Hugh Bradley
- Seat: Warren
- Largest city: Warren

Area
  - Total: 653 sq mi (1,690 km^{2})
  - Land: 649 sq mi (1,680 km^{2})
  - Water: 3.7 sq mi (9.6 km^{2}) 0.6%

Population (2020)
  - Total: 10,545
  - Estimate (2025): 9,828 ▼
  - Density: 16.2/sq mi (6.27/km^{2})
- Time zone: UTC−6 (Central)
  - Summer (DST): UTC−5 (CDT)
- Congressional district: 4th
- Website: bradleycountyar.com

Bradley County is a county located in the U.S. state of Arkansas. As of the 2020 census, the population was 10,545. The county seat is Warren. It is Arkansas's 43rd county, formed on December 18, 1840, and named for Captain Hugh Bradley, who fought in the War of 1812.

Bradley County is a dry county, which means that the sale of alcoholic beverages is prohibited within the county. However, some cities within the county, such as Warren and Hermitage, may have their own laws allowing for the sale of alcohol within their city limits.

== History ==
Indigenous peoples of various cultures had lived along the rivers of Arkansas for thousands of years and created complex societies. Mississippian culture peoples built massive earthwork mounds along the Ouachita River beginning about 1000 CE.

=== Caddo Tribe ===
The Felsenthal refuge at the south end of Bradley County contains over 200 native American archaeological sites, primarily from the Caddo tribe that lived in the area as long as 5,000 years ago. These sites include the remains of seasonal fishing camps, ceremonial plazas, temple mounds and large villages containing as many as 200 structures.

=== French and Spanish control ===
Arkansas Creoles are a Louisiana French ethnic group descended from the inhabitants of Colonial New France and French Louisiana.

After Hernando de Soto's exploration of the Mississippi Valley during the 1540s, there is little evidence of any European activity in the Ouachita River valley until the latter 17th century.

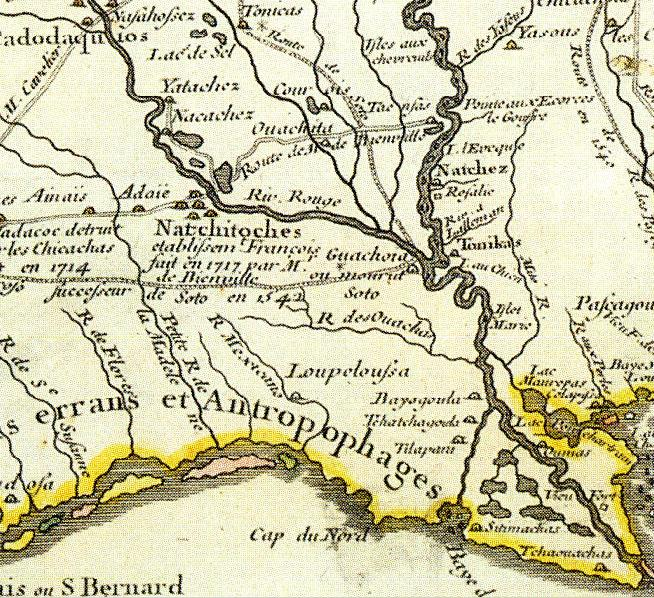
The map of the "Route de Thionville" across Bradley County, Arkansas, the Ouachita River, the Saline river, and Bayou Bartholomew is show at Spanish Texas. See

=== Mississippi Company ===
Louis XIV's long reign and wars had nearly bankrupted the French monarchy. Rather than reduce spending, the Regency of Louis XV of France endorsed the monetary theories of John Law, a Scottish financier. In 1716, Law was given a charter for the Banque Royale under which the national debt was assigned to the bank in return for extraordinary privileges. The key to the Banque Royale agreement was that the national debt would be paid from revenues derived from opening the Mississippi Valley. The Bank was tied to other ventures of Law—the Company of the West and the Companies of the Indies. All were known as the Mississippi Company. The Mississippi Company had a monopoly on trade and mineral wealth. The Company boomed on paper. Law was given the title Duc d'Arkansas. Bernard de la Harpe and his party left New Orleans in 1719 to explore the Red River. In 1721, he explored the Arkansas River. At the Yazoo settlements in Mississippi he was joined by Jean Benjamin who became the scientist for the expedition.

In 1718, there were only 700 people in Louisiana. The Mississippi Company arranged ships to move eight hundred (800) people landed in Louisiana on one day in 1718, doubling the population.

John Law encouraged Germans, particularly Germans of the Alsatian region who had recently fallen under French rule, and the Swiss to emigrate.

Alsace was transformed into a mosaic of Catholic and Protestant territories. Alsace was sold to France within the greater context of the Thirty Years' War (1618–1648). Beset by enemies and to gain a free hand in Hungary, the Habsburgs sold their Sundgau territory (mostly in Upper Alsace) to France in 1646, which had occupied it, for the sum of 1.2 million Thalers.

Prisoners were set free in Paris in September 1719 and later, under the condition that they marry prostitutes and go with them to Louisiana. The newly married couples were chained together and taken to the port of embarkation. After complaints from the Mississippi Company and the concessioners about this class of French immigrants, in May 1720, the French government prohibited such deportations. But, there was a third shipment in 1721.

The Jesuit Charlevoix went from Canada to Louisiana. His letter said "these 9,000 Germans, who were raised in the Palatinate (Alsace part of France) were in Arkansas. The Germans left Arkansas en masse. They went to New Orleans and demanded passage to Europe. The Mississippi Company gave the Germans rich lands on the right bank of the Mississippi River about 25 miles above New Orleans. The area is now known as 'the German Coast'."

=== Estonia ===
Sweden lost Swedish Livonia, Swedish Estonia and Ingria to Russia almost 100 years later, by the Capitulation of Estonia and Livonia in 1710 and the Treaty of Nystad in 1721. Charles Frederic D'Arensbourg emigrated to Louisiana in 1721 with thirty officers. They would rather move to Louisiana, instead of living as Russians.

=== French ===
European interest in the region then came in three distinct waves. The French hunters, trappers, and traders appeared first and operated along the Ouachita River valley until the Natchez revolt of 1729, which frightened away any developers for a while. Next, in the 1740s and 1750s, French settlers meandered north from the Pointe Coupee Post in south French Louisiana and named many of bayous. These settlers returned south to Pointe Coupee before the Spaniards took possession of Louisiana in the late 1760s. The third wave of European settlers were actually descendants of the second wave, mostly true Louisiana Creoles born near the Point Coupee and Opelousas Posts. Additionally, a few Canadians came down the river from the Arkansas Post, and a few native French traders also operated along the river in the 1770s.

Prior to 1782, with the exception of occasional failed colonization schemes, the Europeans ignored the vast Ouachita Valley, which extended from the area around Hot Springs, Arkansas southward towards the Mississippi River in Louisiana. This changed with the 1779–1782 war between England and Spain. After their defeat at the Battle of Baton Rouge in 1779, the English yielded control of Natchez to the Spaniards, and this led to several years of fighting as the English settlers resisted Spanish rule over them. After the ultimate English defeat, many settlers fled to the Ouachita Valley region, creating the threat of English/American rebel activity in the Ouachita Valley region. This prompted the Spanish governor, Don Bernardo, the Comte de Galvez, to establish a strong buffer zone between the independent American states and the Spanish province of Louisiana. In 1781 Galvez created the “Poste d'Ouachita” and named Jean-Baptist Filhiol (also known as Don Juan Filhiol) as the commandant. Filhiol served in this capacity between 1782 and 1804, and through his service helped to keep a firm Spanish grip on activities in the region.

Filhiol, his new wife, and a few others arrived in the Ouachita country in April 1782. He traveled up the river, past present-day Union Parish, to the old trading post called “Ecore a Fabri” (now Camden). For various reasons, after a few years Filhiol decided not to build his headquarters there and took his group back down river to the "Prairie des Canots".

Many Louisiana Creole people arrived in Louisiana following the Slave Uprising led by Toussaint Breda (later called L'Overture) in 1791 in Ste. Dominique, later called Haiti.

In 1801, Spanish Governor Don Juan Manuel de Salcedo took over for Governor Calvo, and the right to deposit goods from the United States was fully restored. Napoleon Bonaparte returned Louisiana to French control from Spain in 1800, under the Treaty of San Ildefonso (Louisiana had been a Spanish colony since 1762.) However, the treaty was kept secret, and Louisiana remained under Spanish control until a transfer of power to France on November 30, 1803, just three weeks before the cession to the United States.

James Monroe and Robert R. Livingston traveled to Paris to negotiate the purchase in 1802. Their interest was only in the port and its environs; they did not anticipate the much larger transfer of territory that would follow.

The Louisiana Purchase was the acquisition by the United States of America of 828,800 square miles (2,147,000 km^{2}) of France's claim to the territory of Louisiana in 1803.

=== Name origins ===
- L'Aigles Creek, Aigle "Eagle Creek", Eagle Lake.
- Bogalusa. A place on the Saline River near the Ouachita River (a different place with the same name is Bogalusa, Louisiana).
- Charivari Creek, south of Hilo (a French folk custom in which the community gave a noisy, discordant mock serenade, also pounding on pots and pans, at the home of a person marrying for the second time.)
- Felsenthal a Germanic word meaning "hills and valley" or "rocky valley."
- Moreau Bayou de Moreau (or Moro Creek, Moro Bay) Moreau is a French surname.
- Pereo geethe Lake. Pereo (Latin: Disappearance, death, loss.) Geethe (Estonian: currently a female name. Historical records suggest that Geethe might have been used as a male name in the 18th and 19th centuries. The origins and meaning of the name Geethe are unclear, but it's possible that it's derived from the Germanic word "güt," meaning "good" or " virtuous.")

=== Early American period ===
During the period 1837–1861, settlers arrived from Mississippi, Alabama, Tennessee, and Georgia. Prior to 1860, to reach the available farmland of northwestern Louisiana and southwestern Arkansas, settlers from the Gulf Coast states most often crossed the Mississippi River at Natchez, then came up the Ouachita River.

=== 1824-1940 ===
During the war of 1812, Captain Hugh Bradley had frequent conversations with Spaniards who had explored the Red River country. The Spaniards told of the richness and wildness of that area.

About 1817, Captain Hugh Bradley, Ike Pennington, James Turner, Charles H. Ceay, and James Beard with their families moved using keelboats on the Cumberland River. They went west of Prairie D'Ane along the Red River near Shreveport, Louisiana. But the floods of the Red River caused diseases and fevers to the point of discouraging the inhabitants.

Around the year 1824, Ike Pennington started a settlement two miles north of where Warren now stands.

Captain Hugh Bradley moved to what was then Clark County in 1825. By 1826 they had all settled permanently near Pennington and had begun their permanent residences.

In early years, there was settlement known as the Saline Settlement and as the Pennington Settlement. Later it was named Cabeens. Postal service in the area was first established in 1832 at Cabeens, which may have been named after J.T. Cabeen, an early surveyor.

Dr. John Thomas Cabeen served as postmaster from 1832 until 1843. John Harvie Marks donated thirty acres, and John Splawn donated ten acres of land for the town site. The first circuit court met on April 26, 1841, at Hugh Bradley's house. The name of Cabeens was changed to Warren in 1843. In 1850, the town of Warren was incorporated.

In 1840, a new county was created out of Union County, and named for Hugh Bradley.

Some settlers from Alabama, Georgia, and Tennessee arrived in the 1840s and 1850s.

Around 1849, Wiley and Louisa Powell moved to Bradley County, taking the title to the land that is now Hermitage. The following year. Louisa's parents, James and Susan Thompson, joined the Powells that year, as did Robert Pulley (who was pastor of Holly Springs Baptist Church) and the Jarrett family. Jefferson Singer, who had lived in Bradley County since 1840, acquired the Powell Farm at a later date. A post office for Hermitage was established in 1854. The name of the town was to honor President Andrew Jackson, whose home in Nashville, Tennessee was called The Hermitage.

The Bradley Lumber Company began logging the virgin hardwoods before 1901. In 1901, the Warren, Johnsville, and Saline River (WJ & SR) railroads began operations. It was owned by the Bradley Lumber Company. The railroad operated 15 miles of rails. It connected Warren with Hermitage and there was a connection with the Rock Island. There was a connection with the St. Louis, Iron Mountain & Southern Railway.

The Warren, Johnsville, and Saline River (WJ & SR) railroads brought the logs to the Warren plant. Finished products were shipped to Rock Island and the St. Louis, Iron Mountain & Southern Railway. In 1920, it was renamed the Warren & Saline River Railroad (W&SRR). The Warren & Ouachita Valley Railway was jointly owned by the Arkansas Lumber Company and the Southern Lumber Company. It began operations around 1901 connecting Banks with Warren.

Parts of former railroads of the lumber companies were changed to company roads for trucking logging to mills in Warren. Those company roads were straight, level, and with long radius curves because the railroads were built straight, level, and with long radius curves. Many company roads because county roads. Temporary spur rail lines were built to remove some of the virgin timber. The rails and crossties were repeatedly reused. There was earthwork cut (earthworks) for the spur rail lines remain.

The Bradley Lumber Company at Wheeler and Martin street employed 1,100 workers in year 1941. That company was only of the largest purchasers of hardwood in the south. A leading product was unassembled furniture which was crated and shipped to eastern assembly plants. There was a flooring plant and a hickory products department. The company had a village of 4 and 5 rooms houses for its employees.

A Southern Lumber Company mill was at the west end of Pine Street. That plant employed about 400 people to make oak and pine flooring. The company also owned a village for its employees.

== Geography ==
Bradley County is located in southeastern Arkansas, and is bordered by Union County to the southwest, Calhoun County to the west, Drew County to the east, Ashley County to the southeast, and Cleveland County to the north.

According to the U.S. Census Bureau, the county has a total area of 653 square miles (1,690 km^{2}), of which 649 square miles (1,680 km^{2}) is land and 3.7 square miles (9.6 km^{2}) (0.6%) is water.

The Mississippi Embayment extends to the Saline River valley along the east and southeast edge of Bradley County. The Ouachita River runs along the southwest edge of the county. The Saline River (Ouachita River) flows along most of the east edge of the county. The L'Aigle Creek (Saline River of the Ouachita River) drains most of the area in the county.

=== Topographic map ===
A Topographic map of Bradley County is at https://en-us.topographic-map.com/maps/ettn/Bradley-County/

The lowest point in Arkansas is 55 feet above sea level, at the Ouachita River on the border with Louisiana.

=== Major highways ===
- Future Interstate 69
- U.S. Highway 63
- U.S. Highway 278
- Highway 8
- Highway 160
- Highway 172
- Highway 189
- Highway 275
- Highway 980

=== Adjacent counties ===
- Cleveland County (north)
- Drew County (east)
- Ashley County (southeast)
- Union County (southwest)
- Calhoun County (west)

=== Protected areas ===
- Felsenthal National Wildlife Refuge (part)
- Moro Bay State Park

== Demographics ==
Historical population
Census	Pop.	Note	%±
1850	3,829		—
1860	8,388		119.1%
1870	8,646		3.1%
1880	6,285		−27.3%
1890	7,972		26.8%
1900	9,651		21.1%
1910	14,518		50.4%
1920	15,970		10.0%
1930	17,494		9.5%
1940	18,097		3.4%
1950	15,987		−11.7%
1960	14,029		−12.2%
1970	12,778		−8.9%
1980	13,803		8.0%
1990	11,793		−14.6%
2000	12,600		6.8%
2010	11,508		−8.7%
2020	10,545		−8.4%
2025 (est.)	9,828	▼	−6.8%
U.S. Decennial Census; 1790–1960 1900–1990; 1990–2000 2010–2016

=== 2020 census ===
As of the 2020 census, the county had a population of 10,545. The median age was 40.6 years. 25.5% of residents were under the age of 18 and 19.1% of residents were 65 years of age or older. For every 100 females there were 94.9 males, and for every 100 females age 18 and over there were 90.9 males age 18 and over.

The racial makeup of the county was 55.9% White, 27.9% Black or African American, 0.9% American Indian and Alaska Native, 0.3% Asian, <0.1% Native Hawaiian and Pacific Islander, 11.0% from some other race, and 4.2% from two or more races. Hispanic or Latino residents of any race comprised 14.9% of the population.

50.1% of residents lived in urban areas, while 49.9% lived in rural areas.

There were 4,277 households in the county, of which 32.5% had children under the age of 18 living in them. Of all households, 43.1% were married-couple households, 19.8% were households with a male householder and no spouse or partner present, and 32.5% were households with a female householder and no spouse or partner present. About 30.6% of all households were made up of individuals and 13.4% had someone living alone who was 65 years of age or older.

There were 5,073 housing units, of which 15.7% were vacant. Among occupied housing units, 69.6% were owner-occupied and 30.4% were renter-occupied. The homeowner vacancy rate was 1.8% and the rental vacancy rate was 9.7%.

=== 2010 census ===
As of the 2010 census, there were 11,508 people living in the county. 60.3% were White, 27.6% Black or African American, 0.5% Native American, 0.2% Asian, 10.1% of some other race and 1.3% of two or more races. 13.2% were Hispanic or Latino (of any race).

=== 2000 census ===
As of the 2000 census, there were 12,600 people, 13,103 households and 9,346 families living in the county. The population density was 19 per square mile (7.3/km^{2}). There were 7,002 housing units at an average density of 9 per square mile (3.5/km^{2}). The racial makeup of the county was 53.36% White, 39.63% Black or African American, 0.24% Native American, 0.06% Asian, 0.01% Pacific Islander, 4.91% from other races, and 0.75% from two or more races. 4.25% of the population were Hispanic or Latino of any race.

There were 6,421 households, of which 29.50% had children under the age of 18 living with them, 52.20% were married couples living together, 14.50% had a female householder with no husband present, and 29.90% were non-families. 27.60% of all households were made up of individuals, and 13.90% had someone living alone who was 65 years of age or older. The average household size was 2.45 and the average family size was 2.96.

23.60% of the population were under the age of 18, 9.70% from 18 to 24, 26.50% from 25 to 44, 22.80% from 45 to 64, and 17.50% who were 65 years of age or older. The median age was 38 years. For every 100 females there were 97.70 males. For every 100 females age 18 and over, there were 95.80 males.

The median household income was $38,936, and the median family income was $47,094. Males had a median income of $32,779 versus $27,167 for females. The per capita income for the county was $42,346. About 20.60% of families and 26.30% of the population were below the poverty line, including 33.10% of those under age 18 and 20.80% of those age 65 or over.

== Government and politics ==
=== Government ===
The county government is a constitutional body granted specific powers by the Constitution of Arkansas and the Arkansas Code. The quorum court is the legislative branch of the county government and controls all spending and revenue collection. Representatives are called justices of the peace and are elected from county districts every even-numbered year. The number of districts in a county vary from nine to fifteen, and district boundaries are drawn by the county election commission. The Bradley County Quorum Court has nine members. Presiding over quorum court meetings is the county judge, who serves as the chief operating officer of the county. The county judge is elected at-large and does not vote in quorum court business, although capable of vetoing quorum court decisions.

Bradley County, Arkansas Elected countywide officials
Position	Officeholder	Party
County Judge	Klay McKinney	Republican
County Clerk	Karen Belin	Democratic
Circuit Clerk	Cindy Wagnon	Republican
Sheriff/Collector	Herschel Tillman	Republican
Treasurer	Diane Wesson	Republican
Assessor	Stephanie Bigham	Republican
Coroner	Thomas Frazer	Republican

The composition of the Quorum Court following the 2024 elections is 7 Republicans and 2 Democrats. Justices of the Peace (members) of the Quorum Court following the elections are:

- District 1: Gwendolyn S. Bullard (D)
- District 2: Mike Jolley (R)
- District 3: Pat Morman (R)
- District 4: Jimmy Sledge (D)
- District 5: Tony Cathey (R)
- District 6: Bobby L. Hargrave (R)
- District 7: Jim Anders (R)
- District 8: Alton Ray Richard (R)
- District 9: Dana Harvey (R)

Additionally, the townships of Bradley County are entitled to elect their own respective constables, as set forth by the Constitution of Arkansas. Constables are largely of historical significance as they were used to keep the peace in rural areas when travel was more difficult. The township constables as of the 2024 elections are:

- Pennington: Sim McCoy (R)
- Washington: Kenneth Ferguson (R)

=== Politics ===
Like almost all of Arkansas and the rural South, the 21st century has seen Bradley County make a hard turn to the Republican Party after supporting Democrats throughout its history; the move is likely due to racial and cultural agitation with the party in Appalachian and rural Southern areas. John Kerry was the last Democrat to win the county in a presidential election, in 2004. Further elections has only seen sharper turns to the right, first at the presidential level and increasingly for other contested seats, to the point where this county, and Arkansas as a whole, is very Republican today.

United States presidential election results for Bradley County, Arkansas
Year	Republican		Democratic		Third party(ies)	
Year	No.	%	No.	%	No.	%
1896	185	15.87%	976	83.70%	5	0.43%
1900	153	15.19%	842	83.61%	12	1.19%
1904	188	24.29%	569	73.51%	17	2.20%
1908	316	25.10%	906	71.96%	37	2.94%
1912	137	11.84%	772	66.72%	248	21.43%
1916	314	21.32%	1,159	78.68%	0	0.00%
1920	540	30.73%	1,146	65.22%	71	4.04%
1924	453	29.13%	1,002	64.44%	100	6.43%
1928	447	23.11%	1,487	76.89%	0	0.00%
1932	125	5.90%	1,985	93.76%	7	0.33%
1936	65	3.97%	1,571	95.97%	1	0.06%
1940	123	5.95%	1,939	93.85%	4	0.19%
1944	162	8.63%	1,710	91.10%	5	0.27%
1948	213	9.74%	1,426	65.20%	548	25.06%
1952	869	26.36%	2,417	73.31%	11	0.33%
1956	1,361	30.75%	3,010	68.01%	55	1.24%
1960	873	20.74%	2,960	70.31%	377	8.95%
1964	1,852	45.15%	2,229	54.34%	21	0.51%
1968	802	16.69%	1,457	30.32%	2,546	52.99%
1972	3,218	69.74%	1,368	29.65%	28	0.61%
1976	1,134	24.12%	3,567	75.88%	0	0.00%
1980	1,650	33.74%	3,139	64.19%	101	2.07%
1984	2,690	53.62%	2,313	46.10%	14	0.28%
1988	2,089	48.93%	2,167	50.76%	13	0.30%
1992	1,482	30.64%	2,954	61.07%	401	8.29%
1996	1,146	28.88%	2,566	64.67%	256	6.45%
2000	1,793	45.06%	2,122	53.33%	64	1.61%
2004	2,011	47.33%	2,206	51.92%	32	0.75%
2008	2,262	55.98%	1,680	41.57%	99	2.45%
2012	2,134	58.43%	1,449	39.68%	69	1.89%
2016	2,164	59.24%	1,317	36.05%	172	4.71%
2020	2,335	63.90%	1,214	33.22%	105	2.87%
2024	2,213	68.96%	961	29.95%	35	1.09%

== Communities ==
=== Cities ===
- Hermitage
- Warren (county seat)

=== Town ===
- Banks

=== Unincorporated communities ===
- Corinth
- Ingalls
- Jersey
- Johnsville
- Moro Bay
- Mount Olive
- Sumpter
- Vick

=== Townships ===
Townships in Arkansas are the divisions of a county. Each township includes unincorporated areas; some may have incorporated cities or towns within part of their boundaries. Arkansas townships have limited purposes in modern times. However, the United States census does list Arkansas population based on townships (sometimes referred to as "county subdivisions" or "minor civil divisions"). Townships are also of value for historical purposes in terms of genealogical research. Each town or city is within one or more townships in an Arkansas county based on census maps and publications. The townships of Bradley County are listed below; listed in parentheses are the cities, towns, and/or census-designated places that are fully or partially inside the township.

- Clay (Banks)
- Eagle
- Marion
- Moro
- Ouachita
- Palestine
- Pennington (Warren)
- River
- Sumpter
- Washington (Hermitage)

== Piney Woods ==
Bradley County is within the Arkansas Timberlands which is within the Piney Woods.

== See also ==
- List of lakes in Bradley County, Arkansas
- National Register of Historic Places listings in Bradley County, Arkansas
- Spanish Empire
- History of Louisiana
- Louisiana Territory
- Louisiana
- Arkansas Territory
- History of Arkansas
