= Banks, Arkansas =

- Town
- Location of Banks in Bradley County, Arkansas.
- Coordinates: 33°34′33″N 92°16′02″W
- Country: United States
- State: Arkansas
- County: Bradley

Area
  - Total: 0.37 sq mi (0.97 km^{2})
  - Land: 0.37 sq mi (0.97 km^{2})
  - Water: 0 sq mi (0.00 km^{2})
- Elevation: 207 ft (63 m)

Population (2020)
  - Total: 87
  - Estimate (2025): 81 ▼
  - Density: 231.5/sq mi (89.39/km^{2})
- Time zone: UTC-6 (Central (CST))
  - Summer (DST): UTC-5 (CDT)
- ZIP code: 71631
- Area code: 870
- FIPS code: 05-03430
- GNIS feature ID: 2405207

Banks is a town in Bradley County, Arkansas, United States. As of the 2020 census the population was 87.

== Geography ==
U.S. Route 278 passes through the center of the town, leading east 13 miles (21 km) to Warren, the county seat, and west 13 miles (21 km) to Hampton, the county seat of Calhoun County.

According to the United States Census Bureau, Banks has a total area of 1.0 km^{2} (0.39 sq mi), all land.

== Demographics ==
Historical population
Census	Pop.	Note	%±
1910	244		—
1920	347		42.2%
1930	199		−42.7%
1940	248		24.6%
1950	240		−3.2%
1960	233		−2.9%
1970	189		−18.9%
1980	216		14.3%
1990	88		−59.3%
2000	120		36.4%
2010	124		3.3%
2020	87		−29.8%
2025 (est.)	81	▼	−6.9%
U.S. Decennial Census

As of the census of 2000, there were 120 people, 50 households, and 32 families residing in the town. The population density was 118.8 people/km^{2} (308 people/mi^{2}). There were 63 housing units at an average density of 62.4 units/km^{2} (162 units/mi^{2}). The racial makeup of the town was 72.50% White, 20.00% Black or African American, 4.17% from other races, and 3.33% from two or more races. 5.00% of the population were Hispanic or Latino of any race.

There were 50 households, out of which 26.0% had children under the age of 18 living with them, 40.0% were married couples living together, 20.0% had a female householder with no husband present, and 36.0% were non-families. 30.0% of all households were made up of individuals, and 18.0% had someone living alone who was 65 years of age or older. The average household size was 2.40 and the average family size was 2.97.

In the town, the population was spread out, with 22.5% under the age of 18, 10.0% from 18 to 24, 25.0% from 25 to 44, 20.0% from 45 to 64, and 22.5% who were 65 years of age or older. The median age was 41 years. For every 100 females, there were 118.2 males. For every 100 females age 18 and over, there were 111.4 males.

The median income for a household in the town was $23,958, and the median income for a family was $25,000. Males had a median income of $24,583 versus $21,875 for females. The per capita income for the town was $10,416. There were 22.2% of families and 20.8% of the population living below the poverty line, including 8.3% of under 18 and 30.8% of those over 64.

== Education ==
Students in Banks attend Warren School District.

Banks School District consolidated into Warren School District on July 1, 1985.

== Buck Fever ==
Buck Fever is Banks' festival that takes place every year on the opening weekend of modern gun deer hunting season. There is a parade, food and craft vendors, entertainment and more.
