= Jarius Wright =

American football player (born 1989)

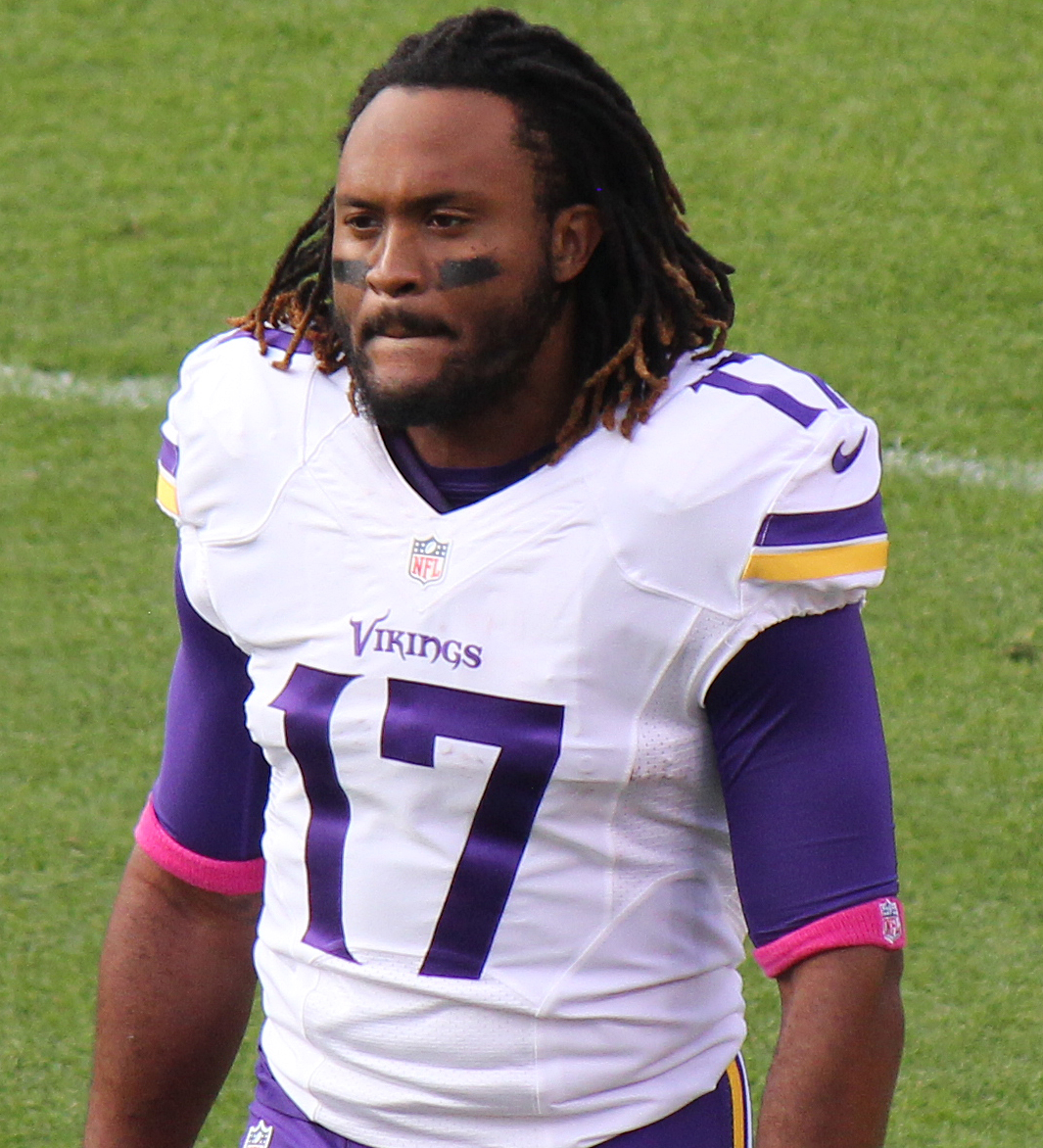
- Wright with the Minnesota Vikings in 2015

No. 17, 13
- Position: Wide receiver

Personal information
- Born: November 25, 1989 (age 36); Warren, Arkansas, U.S.
- Listed height: 5 ft 10 in (1.78 m)
- Listed weight: 190 lb (86 kg)

Career information
- High school: Warren
- College: Arkansas (2008–2011)
- NFL draft: 2012: 4th round, 118th overall pick

Career history
- Minnesota Vikings (2012–2017); Carolina Panthers (2018–2019)

Awards and highlights
- First-team All-SEC (2011)

Career NFL statistics
- Receptions: 224
- Receiving yards: 2,782
- Receiving touchdowns: 11
- Stats at Pro Football Reference

Jarius Wright (born November 25, 1989) is an American former professional football player who was a wide receiver in the National Football League (NFL). He was selected by the Minnesota Vikings in the fourth round of the 2012 NFL draft. He played college football for the Arkansas Razorbacks, earning first-team All-SEC honors in 2011.

== Early life ==
Wright attended Warren High School in Warren, Arkansas, where he participated in football, basketball, baseball, and track and was teammates with Greg Childs and Chris Gragg. He was an All-State choice during his junior season when he finished with 51 receptions, 1,086 yards and 15 touchdowns to go with five more scores on kick and punt returns. As a senior in 2007, he was named to the All-State team and the All-Arkansas team by the Arkansas Democrat-Gazette after racking up 58 receptions for 1,350 yards and 15 touchdowns and returning three kicks for touchdowns. He also earned a spot on the Associated Press (AP) Super Team.

In track & field, Wright scored eighth in the 55-meter dash at the 2007 Arkansas 1A-4A Indoor State Championships, and set a personal-best time of 6.79 seconds in the preliminary rounds. In addition, he also owned a 4.4-second 40-yard dash.

Regarded as a four-star recruit by Rivals.com, Wright was ranked as the No. 218 player in the nation, as well as the No. 18 wide receiver and No. 3 player in the state of Arkansas. Wright chose Arkansas over scholarship offers from Oklahoma, Tennessee and Mississippi, among others.

== College career ==
Wright played college football at the University of Arkansas for the Razorbacks from 2008 to 2011, and was a first-team All-SEC selection as a senior in 2011. He appeared in 50 games during his Arkansas career, making 44 starts and missing only one game during his career. He ranks first in the school's record books in receptions (168) and receiving yards (2,934), and also ranks fifth all-time in SEC history in receiving yards. His 24 career receiving touchdowns ranks second in school history and tied for 15th in SEC history. He had nine 100+ yard games, which tied for second in program history.

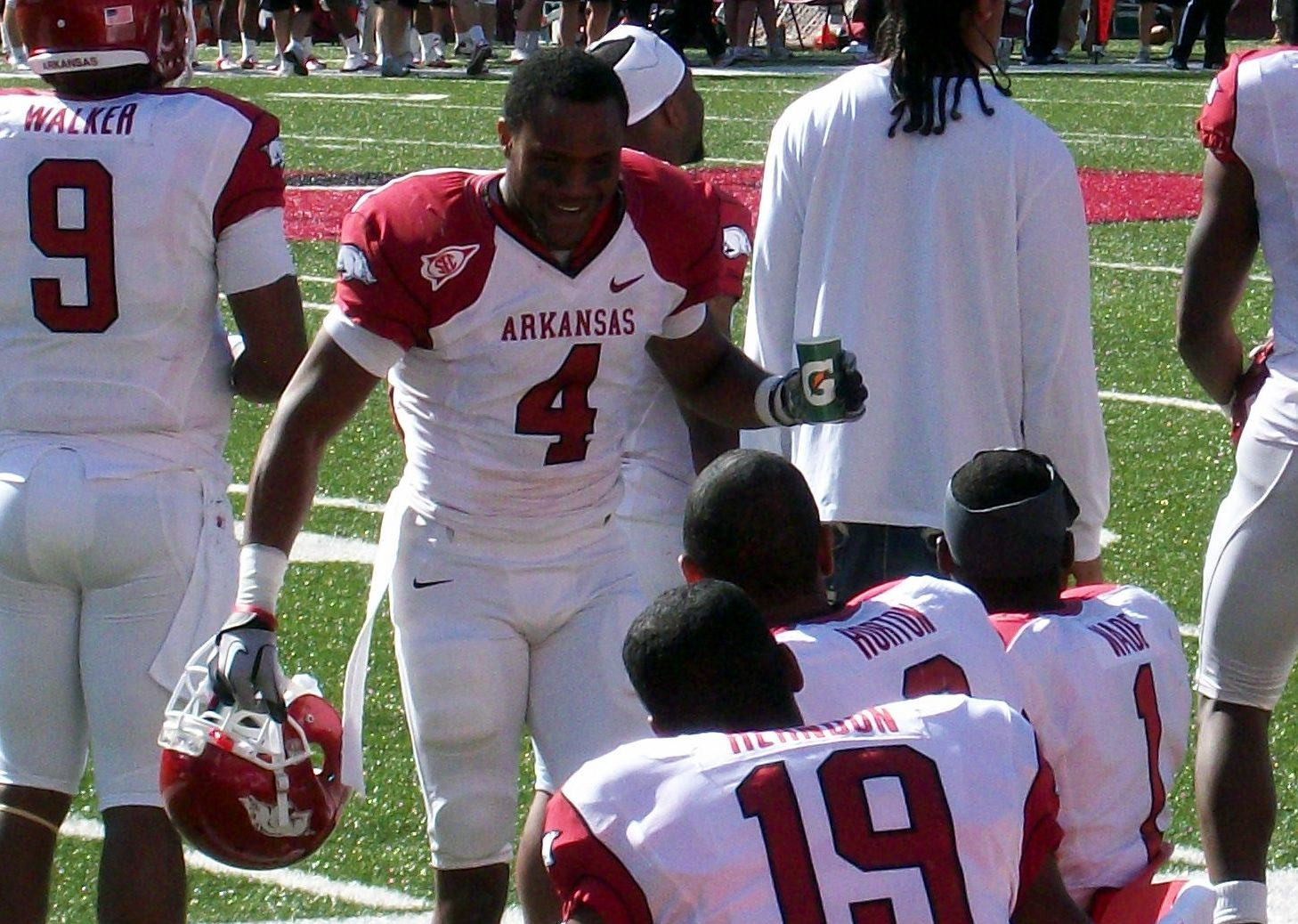
Wright at the University of Arkansas.

In 2009, Wright was named Arkansas' Outstanding Offensive Player in the Liberty Bowl against East Carolina when he had four catches for 90 yards and one touchdown.

He recorded a career-long 89-yard score in 2010 versus Mississippi State.

Wright set single-season records for Arkansas as a senior in 2011 with 66 receptions, 1,117 yards and 12 touchdowns despite missing one game. He was named SEC Co-Offensive Player of the Week after torching Texas A&M with 13 receptions for 281 yards and two touchdowns; the 281 yards was second in SEC history and an Arkansas single-game record, and the 13 receptions tied the record for receptions in a game. For his play, he was a first-team All-SEC selection. He helped Arkansas to an 11–2 overall record in 2011, win the Cotton Bowl over Kansas State 29–16, and finish ranked #5 in the final polls.

== Professional career ==
Pre-draft measurables
Height	Weight	Arm length	Hand span	40-yard dash	10-yard split	20-yard split	20-yard shuttle	Three-cone drill	Vertical jump	Broad jump	Bench press
5 ft 9 5/8 in (1.77 m)	182 lb (83 kg)	31 1/2 in (0.80 m)	8 1/2 in (0.22 m)	4.42 s	1.53 s	2.56 s	4.03 s	6.93 s	38 in (0.97 m)	10 ft 0 in (3.05 m)	11 reps
All values from NFL Combine

=== Minnesota Vikings ===
On April 28, 2012, Wright was selected by the Minnesota Vikings in the fourth round (118th overall) of the 2012 NFL draft, joining former college and high school teammate Greg Childs in the Vikings 2012 draft class, selected 16 spots later (#134 overall). He was the first of three Vikings picks in the 4th Round of the 2012 NFL Draft. He made his NFL debut against the Detroit Lions on November 11, 2012, catching three passes from quarterback Christian Ponder for 65 yards and a touchdown. He had the two longest catches by Vikings during his rookie season in 2012 with 65 and 54-yarders. He helped set a Vikings record when five rookies started a game vs. the Chicago Bears on November 25, joining Matt Kalil, Rhett Ellison, Josh Robinson, and Harrison Smith.

==== 2012 season ====
As a rookie in 2012, Wright caught two touchdowns on the season to lead Vikings rookies. He played in final seven regular season games and the Wild Card playoff at Green Bay with one start in the regular season against the Chicago Bears. He received the two longest passes on the Vikings season with a 65-yard catch against the Green Bay Packers and a 54-yard catch against the Detroit Lions. His first NFL reception in his first game was a 54-yard strike from Christian Ponder against the Detroit Lions. He had a career-high seven catches in his second career game, a road game against the Chicago Bears. He scored his first career touchdown on a three-yard reception from Ponder against the Detroit Lions. In the regular season finale, he recorded an eight-yard touchdown against the Green Bay Packers.

==== 2013 season ====
In 2013, Wright scored a new career-high with three touchdowns, including two against the eventual Super Bowl champion Seattle Seahawks top-ranked defense and the first one a 38-yard touchdown burning first-team all-pro corner Richard Sherman. He recorded a career-long 95 receiving yards in an upset win over the playoff-bound Philadelphia Eagles. His lone catch at Cincinnati was a 36-yard touchdown pass from Matt Cassel. He started in the season finale game vs. the Detroit Lions, the final game at the Mall of America Field. He started against the Seattle Seahawks in place of injured Greg Jennings, notching a career-best pair of touchdown catches, a 38-yard catch from Christian Ponder and a 21-yard catch from backup Matt Cassel. He had a season-high three catches vs. the Cleveland Browns.

==== 2014 season ====
In 2014, Wright had the best season of his career, posting career-highs in starts (seven), receptions (42), receiving yards (588) and first downs (25). He also had two touchdown receptions, including one on a screen pass from Teddy Bridgewater that he took 87 yards for a game-winning overtime touchdown on December 7 against the New York Jets. That was the longest reception of his career and the second-longest in the NFL that season.

==== 2015 season ====
On September 10, 2015, Wright signed a four-year contract extension with the Vikings worth $14.8 million, including $7 million guaranteed. The contract began in 2016, after the end of Wright's rookie deal, and would have kept him with the team through 2019. He logged 34 catches for 442 yards in 16 games with three starts. He topped 50 yards receiving twice in three weeks after posting five catches for 51 yards against the Arizona Cardinals and three catches for a season-high 57 yards in the Vikings' blowout win over the New York Giants on December 27. He notched a career-long 29-yard carry on a reverse run at Detroit in week 2. He also recorded a 52-yard catch against the Kansas City Chiefs in week 6, the second straight year he has posted the Vikings season-long reception.

==== 2016 season ====
In 2016, Wright played in only eight games, recording a career-low 11 receptions for 67 yards and one touchdown.

==== 2017 season ====
In 2017, Wright played in 16 games, recording 18 receptions for 198 yards and two touchdowns.

On March 16, 2018, Wright was released by the Vikings.

=== Carolina Panthers ===
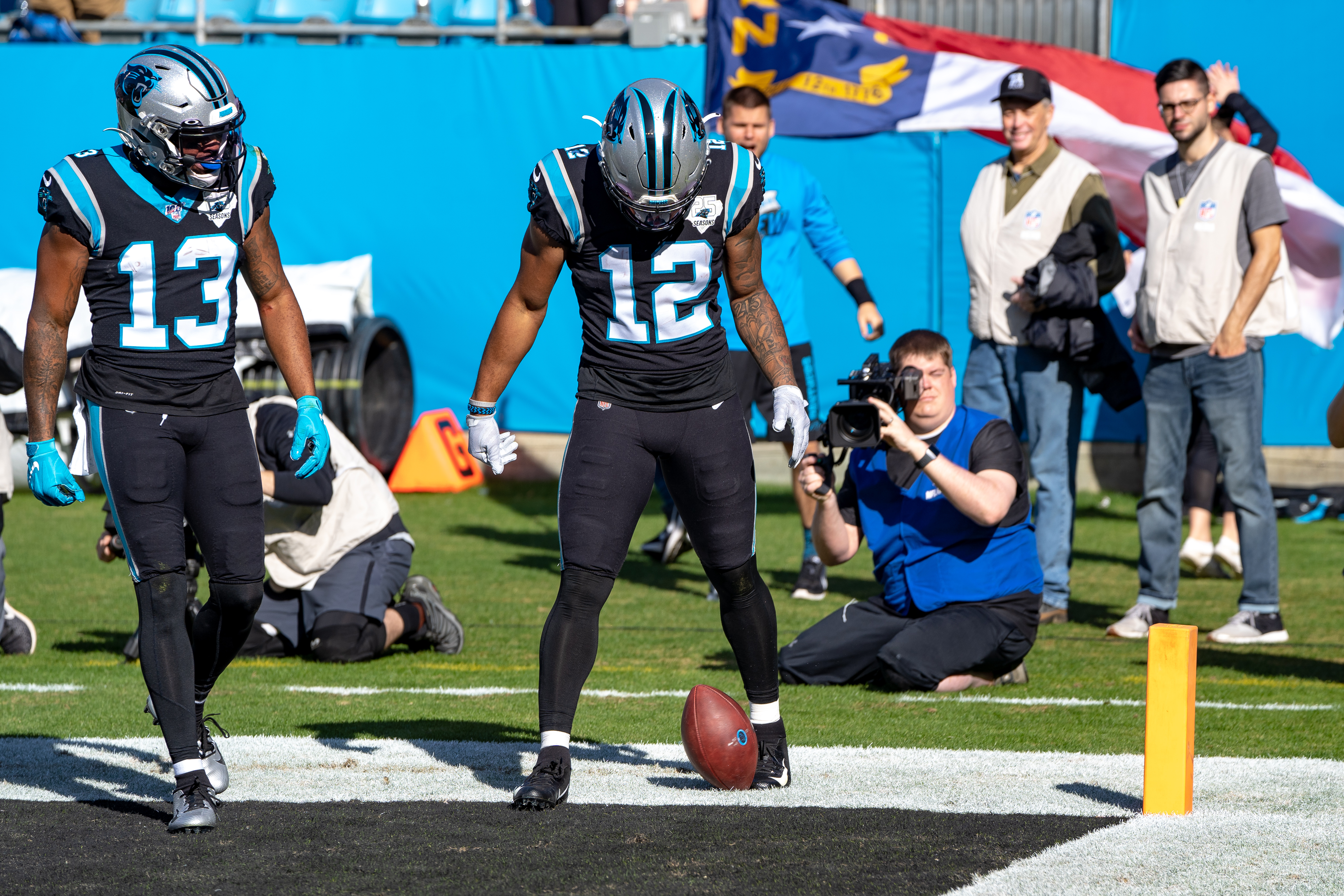
Wright (left) in a game against the Washington Redskins

On March 20, 2018, Wright signed a two-year contract with the Carolina Panthers, reuniting with former Vikings offensive coordinator, Norv Turner. In the 2018 season, he had 43 receptions for 447 yards and one touchdown. He returned to play in 2019 with 296 yards receiving, and a full 16-game season for Carolina. Wright had consecutive years of appearing in every regular season game for the Panthers.

== NFL career statistics ==
Legend
**Bold**	Career high

Year	Team	GP	Receiving					Fumbles	
Year	Team	GP	Rec	Yds	Avg	Lng	TD	Fum	Lost
2012	MIN	7	22	310	14.1	65	2	0	0
2013	MIN	16	26	434	**16.7**	42	**3**	0	0
2014	MIN	16	42	**588**	14.0	**87**	2	0	0
2015	MIN	16	34	442	13.0	52	0	1	**1**
2016	MIN	8	11	67	6.1	11	1	0	0
2017	MIN	16	18	198	11.0	30	2	0	0
2018	CAR	16	**43**	447	10.4	33	1	**3**	**1**
2019	CAR	16	28	296	10.6	33	0	0	0
Career		111	224	2,782	12.4	87	11	4	2

== Personal life ==
Wright studied sociology at the University of Arkansas and was named to the Razorback Honor Roll in the fall of 2011 based on his performance in the classroom.

In 2025, Wright was awarded a $5,000 grant from Panthers Charities for the Sylvan Hills High School football program where he serves as an assistant coach, helping to fund equipment and training for the team. In his first year, Wright the Sylvan Hills Bears went from 0–20 the previous two years to a 10–2 record while capturing the 6A East Conference champions, and state playoffs semi-finalist.
