= Eddie Cheatham =

American politician

Member of the Arkansas Senate from the 26th district
- In office January 14, 2013 – January 11, 2021
- Preceded by: Percy Malone
- Succeeded by: Ben Gilmore

Member of the Arkansas House of Representatives from the 9th district
- In office January 2007 – January 14, 2013
- Preceded by: Johnnie Bolin
- Succeeded by: Sheilla Lampkin

Personal details
- Born: March 14, 1947 (age 79) Magnolia, Arkansas
- Party: Democratic
- Education: Southern Arkansas University; University of Arkansas

Eddie L. Cheatham (born March 14, 1947) is an American Democratic politician from South Arkansas. He served in the Arkansas General Assembly from 2007 until losing a reelection bid in November 2020.

== Elections ==
- 2012 With Senate District 26 Senator Percy Malone retired and left the seat open, Cheatham placed first in the three-way May 22, 2012 Democratic Primary with 4,157 votes (36.3%); former Representative Johnnie Bolin placed third. Cheatham won the June 22 runoff election with 4,033 votes (54.1%), and won the November 6, 2012 General election with 14,479 votes (50.6%) against Republican nominee Mike Akin.
- 2006 Initially in House District 9, when Representative Johnnie Bolin left the Legislature and left the seat open, Cheatham won the 2006 Democratic Primary and was unopposed for the November 7, 2006 General election.
- 2008 Cheatham was unopposed for both the May 20, 2008 Democratic Primary and the November 4, 2008 General election.
- 2010 Cheatham was unopposed for both the May 18, 2010 Democratic Primary and the November 2, 2010 General election.

| Preceded by Percy Malone | Arkansas Senate; District 26; January 14, 2013–January 11, 2021 | Succeeded by Ben Gilmore |
| Preceded by Johnnie Bolin | Arkansas House; District 9 January 2007–January 14, 2013 | Succeeded by Sheilla Lampkin |
