= Felsenthal National Wildlife Refuge =

National wildlife refuge in south-central Arkansas

- IUCN category IV (habitat/species management area)
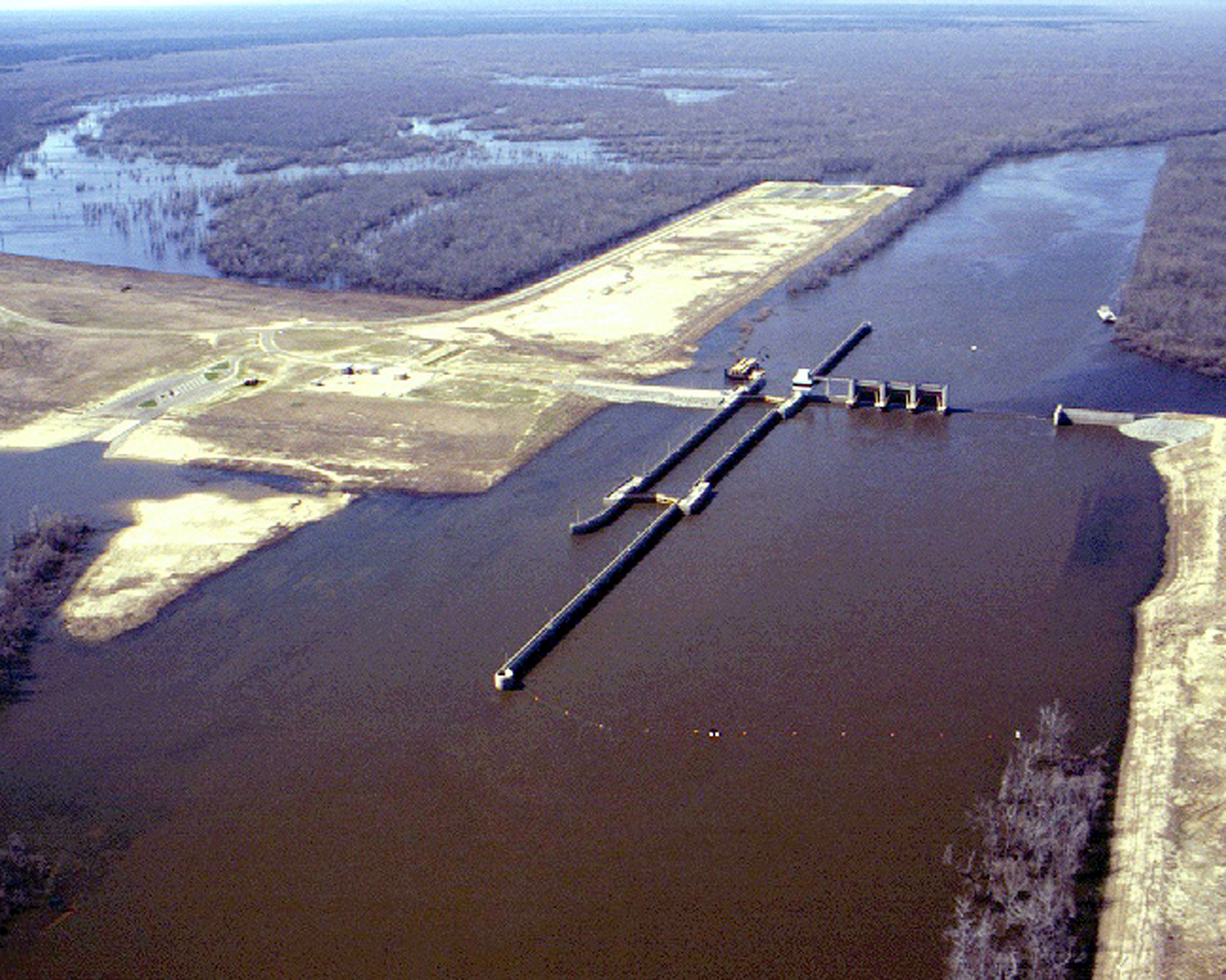
- Felsenthal Lock and Dam, impounding the Felsenthal basin (historically called Lake Jack Lee)

- Location within the United States
- Location: Arkansas, United States
- Nearest city: Crossett, Arkansas
- Coordinates: 33°05′25″N 92°08′31″W
- Area: 76,000 acres (310 km^{2})
- Elevation: 65 feet is the normal navigation pool elevation above the mean sea level
- Established: 1975
- Governing body: U.S. Fish and Wildlife Service
- Website: Felsenthal NWR

The Felsenthal National Wildlife Refuge (NWR) is a 76,000 acre (307.56 km^{2}) national wildlife refuge located in south-central Arkansas in Ashley, Bradley, and Union counties. Felsenthal NWR is one of three refuges forming an administrative complex, which also includes Pond Creek NWR to the northwest and Overflow NWR to the east.

== Habitat and wildlife ==
Felsenthal National Wildlife Refuge (NWR) is a wetlands complex located on the confluence of the Saline and Ouachita Rivers. The refuge is dissected by an intricate system of rivers, creeks, sloughs, and lakes throughout a bottomland hardwood forest that rises to an upland forest community. The Felsenthal basin holds approximately 15,000 acres of water that can double to over 36,000 acres during periods of heavy flooding.

Felsenthal NWR's habitat diversity supports a large amount of biodiversity. Over 1,150 species of plants and animals have been documented on the refuge. Felsenthal NWR is the only national wildlife refuge in Arkansas with a population of the federally-protected red-cockaded woodpecker. The refuge has been recognized as part of a globally Important Bird Area by the National Audubon Society.

== History ==
Felsenthal National Wildlife Refuge (NWR) was established in 1975 as mitigation for the creation of the U.S. Army Corps of Engineers’ Ouachita-Black Rivers Navigation Project and Felsenthal Lock and Dam. The refuge also protects over 200 Native American archaeological sites, primarily of Caddo origin. These sites include the remains of seasonal fishing camps, ceremonial plazas, temple mounds, and large villages. Archaeological sites are closed to the public to protect them from degradation.
