= Greg Childs (American football) =

American gridiron football player (born 1990)

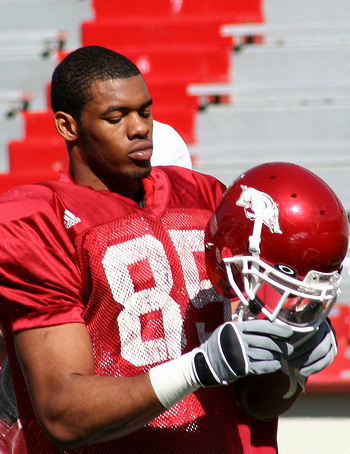
- Childs with Arkansas in 2010

No. 85
- Position: Wide receiver

Personal information
- Born: March 10, 1990 (age 36); Warren, Arkansas, U.S.
- Listed height: 6 ft 3 in (1.91 m)
- Listed weight: 217 lb (98 kg)

Career information
- High school: Warren
- College: Arkansas
- NFL draft: 2012: 4th round, 134th overall pick

Career history
- Minnesota Vikings (2012–2013); Toronto Argonauts (2014)*
- * Offseason or practice squad member only
- Stats at Pro Football Reference

Greg Childs (born March 10, 1990) is an American former professional football wide receiver. After playing college football for Arkansas, he was selected by the Minnesota Vikings in the fourth round of the 2012 NFL draft.

== Early life ==
Childs attended Warren High School in Warren, Arkansas, where he played football, basketball and ran track. He went to school with future University of Arkansas and Minnesota Vikings teammate Jarius Wright and Buffalo Bill player Chris Gragg. He was all state selection as a senior in 2007. In track, Childs was a standout triple jumper (top-jump of 13.60 meters).

== College career ==
As a freshman in 2008, Childs played in 12 games with one start and had 18 receptions for 273 yards and two touchdowns. As a sophomore, he started eight of 13 games and led the team with 48 receptions for 894 yards and seven touchdowns. As a junior in 2010, he played in eight games and had 46 receptions for 659 yards and six touchdowns before suffering a season ending patellar tendon injury.

== Professional career ==
Pre-draft measurables
Height	Weight	Arm length	Hand span	40-yard dash	10-yard split	20-yard split	20-yard shuttle	Three-cone drill	Vertical jump	Broad jump	Bench press
6 ft 3 1/8 in (1.91 m)	219 lb (99 kg)	34 1/8 in (0.87 m)	10 1/8 in (0.26 m)	4.39 s	1.52 s	2.61 s	4.09 s	6.90 s	40.5 in (1.03 m)	10 ft 7 in (3.23 m)	19 reps

=== Minnesota Vikings ===
Childs was selected in the fourth round of the 2012 NFL draft by the Minnesota Vikings.

On August 3, 2012, Childs suffered injuries to both knees while at training camp. An MRI revealed that both knees had a torn patellar tendon, as a result of which Childs was eliminated for his entire rookie season. The Vikings waived/injured Childs on August 5, 2012, and he was subsequently reverted to injured reserve on August 8.

On August 27, 2013, Childs was placed on the reserve/physically unable to perform list.

The Vikings released Childs on March 6, 2014.

In May 2014, Childs went to Jaguars Rookie Mini-Camp on a tryout basis. He was not offered a contract.

=== Toronto Argonauts ===
Childs was signed to the Toronto Argonauts' practice roster on September 10, 2014. He was released by the Argonauts on September 27, 2014.
