= Moro Bay, Arkansas =

Unincorporated community in Arkansas, US

Coordinates: 33°18′23″N 92°21′02″W

Moro Bay is an unincorporated community in Bradley County, Arkansas, United States. It stands at an elevation of 89 feet (27 meters) above mean sea level.
