= Moreau (surname) =

Moreau is a French surname. Notable people with the surname include:

- Adrien Moreau (1843–1906), French genre and historical painter, sculptor and illustrator
- Alicia Moreau (1885–1986), Argentine politician and activist
- Art Moreau, American politician
- Arthur S. Moreau Jr. (1931-1986), American Military Leader
- Basil Anthony Marie Moreau (1799–1873), French priest
- Caroline Moreau (born 2010), American gymnast
- Cecilia Moreau, Argentine politician
- Charles Paul Narcisse Moreau (1837–1916), French soldier and mathematician (and possible chess player)
- Christophe Moreau (born 1971), French cyclist
- Corrie Moreau, American entomologist
- Daniel Moreau Barringer (1806–1873), American politician
- Edgar Moreau (born 1994), French cellist
- Émile Moreau (disambiguation)
- Ethan Moreau (born 1975), Canadian ice hockey player
- Fabian Moreau (born 1994), American football player
- Foster Moreau (born 1997), American football player
- Gisèle Moreau (born 1941), French politician
- Gustave Moreau (1826–1898), French Symbolist painter and sculptor
- Hégésippe Moreau (1810–1838), French lyric poet
- Henri Moreau (disambiguation)
- Hervé Moreau, étoile at the Ballet de l'Opéra National de Paris
- Jacques Moreau (1933–2017), French politician
- Jacques-Joseph Moreau (1804–1884), French psychiatrist
- Jean-Baptiste Moreau (disambiguation)
- Jean Jacques Moreau (1923-2014), French mathematician
- Jean-Michel Moreau (1741-1814), French illustrator and engraver
- Jean Victor Marie Moreau (1763–1813), French general
- Jeanne Moreau (1928-2017), French actress
- Leopoldo Moreau (born 1946), Argentine politician
- Louis Moreau-Lislet (1767-1832), distinguished Louisiana jurist and translator
- Louise Moreau (1921–2001), French politician
- Lucien Moreau (1875–1932), French journalist, monarchist and member of the Action Française.
- Madeleine Moreau (1928 – 1995), French Olympic diver
- Marguerite Moreau (born 1977), American actress
- Mary Moreau, Canadian jurist and justice of the Supreme Court of Canada
- Mathieu Moreau (born 1983), French footballer
- Mathurin Moreau (1822–1912), French sculptor
- Mederic Louis Elie Moreau de Saint-Mery (1750–1819), French historian and lawyer
- Philippe Moreau Defarges (1943–2025), French political scientist
- Pierre Moreau (born 1957), Canadian politician
- Reginald Ernest Moreau (1897–1970), British ornithologist
- Sophia Moreau (born 1972), Canadian philosopher
- Stéphane Moreau (politician) (born 1964), Belgian politician
- Stéphane Moreau (born 1971), French footballer
- Sylvie Moreau (born 1964), Canadian actress
- Yolande Moreau (born 1953), Belgian actress and film director
- Yves Moreau, Belgian professor of engineering

== See also ==
- Dr. Moreau, the villain of The Island of Doctor Moreau, an 1896 science fiction novel by H. G. Wells, and various film adaptations
- Jeff "Joker" Moreau, character portrayed by Seth Green in the video game series Mass Effect.
