= Allen Maxwell =

American politician

Allen Maxwell (April 19, 1943 – March 10, 2014) was an American politician.

From Warren, Arkansas, Maxwell went to University of Arkansas at Monticello and was a human resource manager for Southwestern Bell. He then served in the Arkansas House of Representatives from 2004 to 2010. Maxwell then served as mayor of Monticello, Arkansas and died from a heart attack while still serving office.
