= Percy Malone =

American politician (born 1942)

Member of the Arkansas Senate from the 26th district
- In office 2001–2011
- Succeeded by: Eddie Cheatham

Member of the Arkansas House of Representatives from the 38 district
- In office 1995–1999

Personal details
- Born: August 23, 1942 (age 84) Rosedale, Mississippi
- Party: Democratic
- Education: Delta State University; University of Mississippi
- Profession: Pharmacist

W. Percy Malone (born August 23, 1942) is an American politician, pharmacist, and businessman.

Born in Rosedale, Mississippi, Malone graduated from University of Mississippi School of Pharmacy in 1965. He is a pharmacist and president of W. P. Malone, Incorporated in Arkadelphia, Arkansas. He served in the Arkansas Constitutional Convention of 1980. From 1995 to 1999, Malone served in the Arkansas House of Representatives. Then, from 2001 to 2013 Malone served in the Arkansas State Senate. Malone was a Democrat.

In 2010, he became the namesake and first winner of the Child Advocacy Centers of Arkansas Percy Malone Child Protection Award.

In 2018 he was named the University of Mississippi School of Pharmacy alumnus of the year.
