= Jersey, Arkansas =

Unincorporated community in Arkansas, US

Coordinates: 33°25′42″N 92°18′52″W

Jersey is an unincorporated community in Sumpter township which is located in Bradley County, Arkansas, United States. It is situated at an elevation of 161 feet (49 meters) above mean sea level. The ZIP Code for Jersey is 71651.
