= Overflow National Wildlife Refuge =

National wildlife refuge in Ashley County, Arkansas

- IUCN category IV (habitat/species management area)
- Location within the United States
- Location: Ashley County, Arkansas, United States
- Nearest city: Wilmot, Arkansas
- Coordinates: 33°04′00″N 91°40′30″W
- Area: 13,973 acres (56.55 km^{2})
- Established: 1980
- Governing body: U.S. Fish and Wildlife Service
- Website: Overflow National Wildlife Refuge

Overflow National Wildlife Refuge (NWR) is a 13,973 acre (56.55 km^{2}) national wildlife refuge in Ashley County, Arkansas. Overflow NWR is one of three refuges forming an administrative complex, which also includes Felsenthal NWR and Pond Creek NWR to the west.

== Habitat and wildlife ==
Overflow National Wildlife Refuge (NWR) was established in 1980 to protect one of the last remaining bottomland hardwood forests in the Mississippi Alluvial Plains. These forests are considered vital for wintering migratory waterfowl populations in the Mississippi Flyway. The refuge is composed of nearly 14,000 acres of bottomland hardwood forests, shrub wetlands, moist-soil units, and upland pine-hardwood forests. It also contains a 230-acre (0.9 km^{2}) old growth Sugar Maple and American Beech forest.

Overflow NWR has been recognized as a state-wide Important Bird Area by the National Audubon Society. Carefully timed flooding of the bottomlands and moist-soil units stimulates the growth of native wetland plants, insects, crustaceans, and mollusks. These high energy foods are crucial for the survival of migratory waterfowl and shorebirds.
