= Émile Moreau =

Émile Moreau may refer to:

- Émile Moreau (playwright) (1852–1922), French playwright
- Émile Moreau (politician) (1877–1959), Canadian politician
- Émile Moreau (banker) (1868–1950), French banker
