= Rob Reep =

Robert Gregg Reep, Jr.
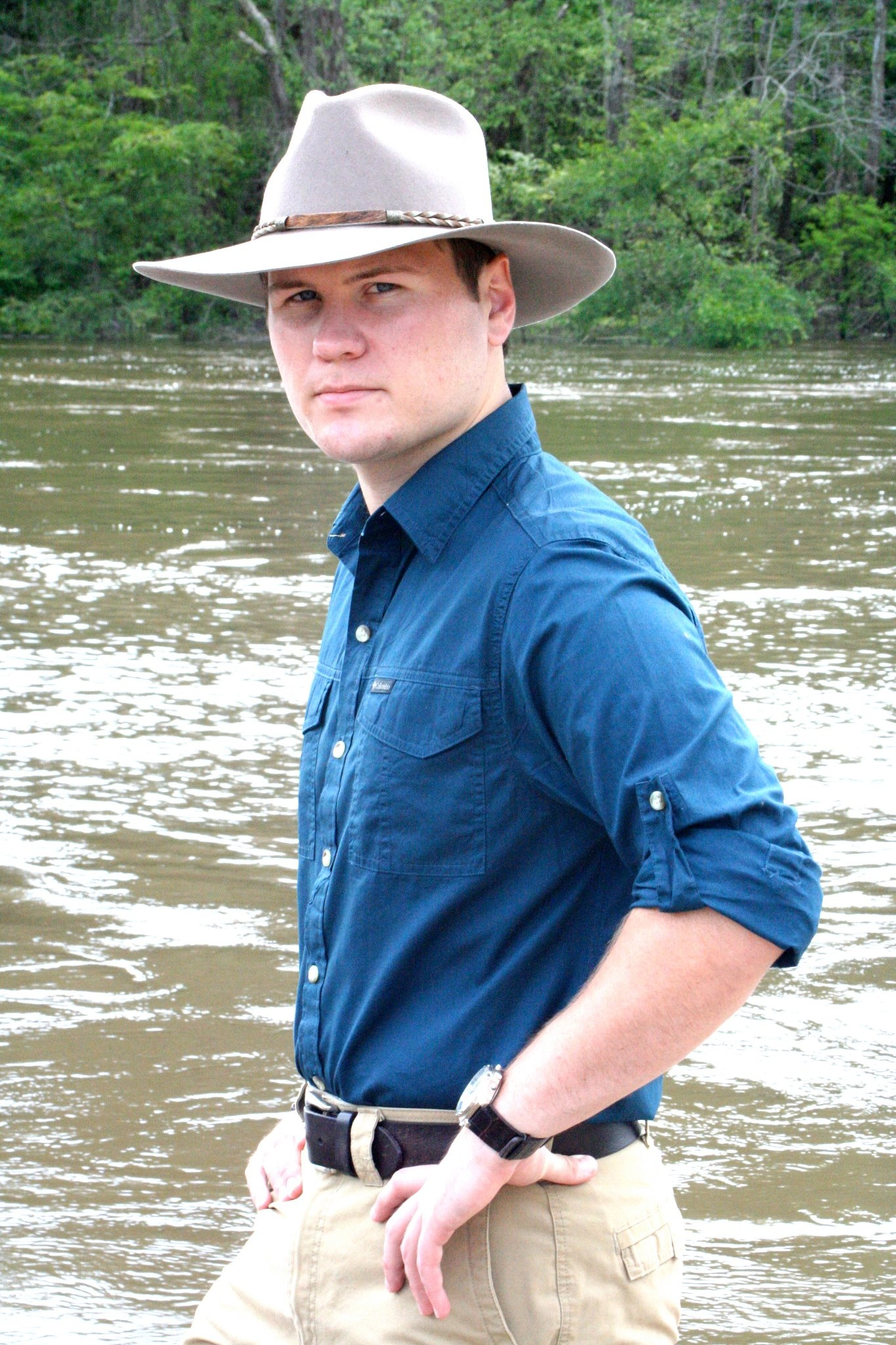
- Born: June 1, 1988 (age 38); Warren, Arkansas, USA
- Education: Arkansas State University
- Occupations: Historian, Filmmaker, Author

Robert "Rob" Gregg Reep Jr. (born June 1, 1988) is an American historian, filmmaker, and documentary narrator.

== Early life ==
In the fall of 2006, Reep began his freshman year at Arkansas State University. He graduated with honors in history as a member of Phi Alpha Theta and earned a bachelor's degree in history in December 2009, having studied history under the guidance of Dr. Joseph Key, Dr. William Maynard, and Dr. Gina Hogue.

Reep interned in the Washington, D.C. office of Congressman Mike Ross during the summer of 2007.

== Professional life ==
Reep was appointed in late 2011 to serve on the Arkansas State University History Department Advisory Council.

He directed and narrated Timber: A Heritage of Dreams and Determination in 2012. He also narrated a short classroom use documentary film about the Japanese internment camps of Jerome and Rohwer during World War II titled, Singled Out. In 2013 he hosted the web series Walking On Water, a show about the Western Interior Seaway. During the spring of 2013, Reep produced and narrated a documentary film about the last free-flowing river in the Ouachita Basin, The Saline.

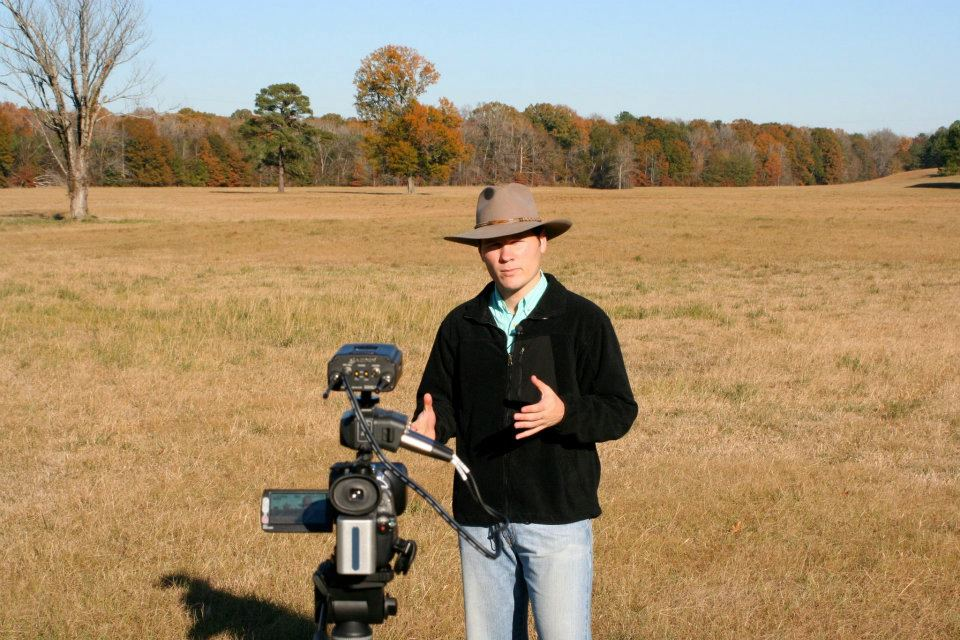
Rob Reep as host of "Watch Out! History's Coming"

Reep is currently producing Fossil HD's first full-length feature film, Captain, which is based on the true-life story of a man named Hugh Bradley, as he become a Tennessee volunteer, fights in several battles, including the Battle of New Orleans, and claims a land bounty in South Arkansas.

== Personal life ==
Rob Reep lives in Warren, Arkansas. Reep served from 2011 to 2013 on the Bradley County Chamber of Commerce Board and served as the 2012 Bradley County Pink Tomato Festival Chairman.
