= Art Moreau =

American politician

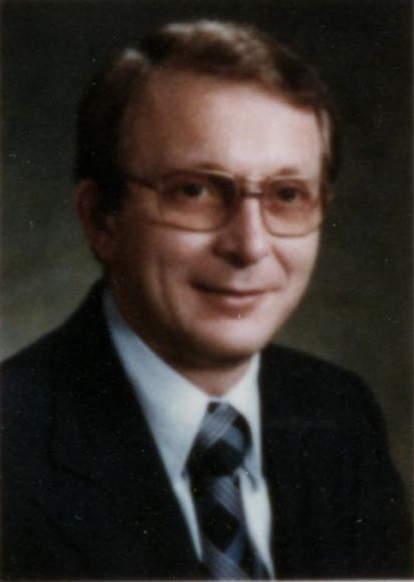
- Moreau in 1977

Member of the Washington House of Representatives for the 42nd district
- In office 1975–1979

Personal details
- Born: 1936 (age 89–90) Bellingham, Washington, United States
- Party: Democratic

Art Moreau (born 1936) is an American former politician in the state of Washington. He served the 42nd district from 1975 to 1979.
