= Hugh Bradley (Arkansas settler) =

Hugh Bradley (c. 1783–1854) was among the early settlers of South Arkansas and the namesake of Bradley County, Arkansas. Captain Bradley is best known for his part in the migration of several families from the military district of middle Tennessee during the 1810s-1820s. His leadership and continuing influence in the establishment of the town of Warren, led to the naming of the county in his honor when it was formed in 1840.

== The Flatboat Journey ==
The Bradleys and several other families, set out from Round Lick, Wilson County, Tennessee in 1818, in flatboats. Probably, they used the Mississippi River to travel to the mouth of the Atchafalaya River in southern Louisiana. From there, they traveled north on the Atchafalaya to the Red River which runs through central Louisiana from the northwest, poling upstream as far as Natchitoches.

Until 1839, the Red River was not navigable from just north of Natchitoches to what is now Shreveport, due to the Great Raft, a natural logjam which had prevented river traffic since the beginning of American exploration of the Louisiana Territory. The Bradleys found a route northward, making it to the place now known as Bradley, Arkansas

Among Bradley's many family members making the trek to new land were his niece Mary Jane "Polly" Bradley, who would later become the first First Lady of the State of Arkansas. Her burial place alongside her husband, the first state governor, James Sevier Conway, is on the old site of the Walnut Hill plantation, near the small community of Bradley, in Hempstead County, Arkansas. Although enough of the Bradley family stayed there to merit the naming of the community, some time around 1826, Captain Bradley and several other families in his company moved a bit more eastward, near the Saline River, in a place that would become the town of Warren.

== Bradley County ==
Statehood arrived for Arkansas in 1836. At the time, the location of what is now Bradley County was included in the boundaries of Union County. In late 1840, Bradley County was formed and named after one of its most prominent citizens Hugh Bradley. As legend has it, the town of Warren, incorporated in 1851, was named after one of Captain Bradley's freed slaves, Warren.

== In popular culture ==
Fossil Hound Dog Films is currently producing a full length feature film based on the life of Hugh Bradley. It is expected to be complete by the summer of 2015.
