= Warren, Arkansas =

- City
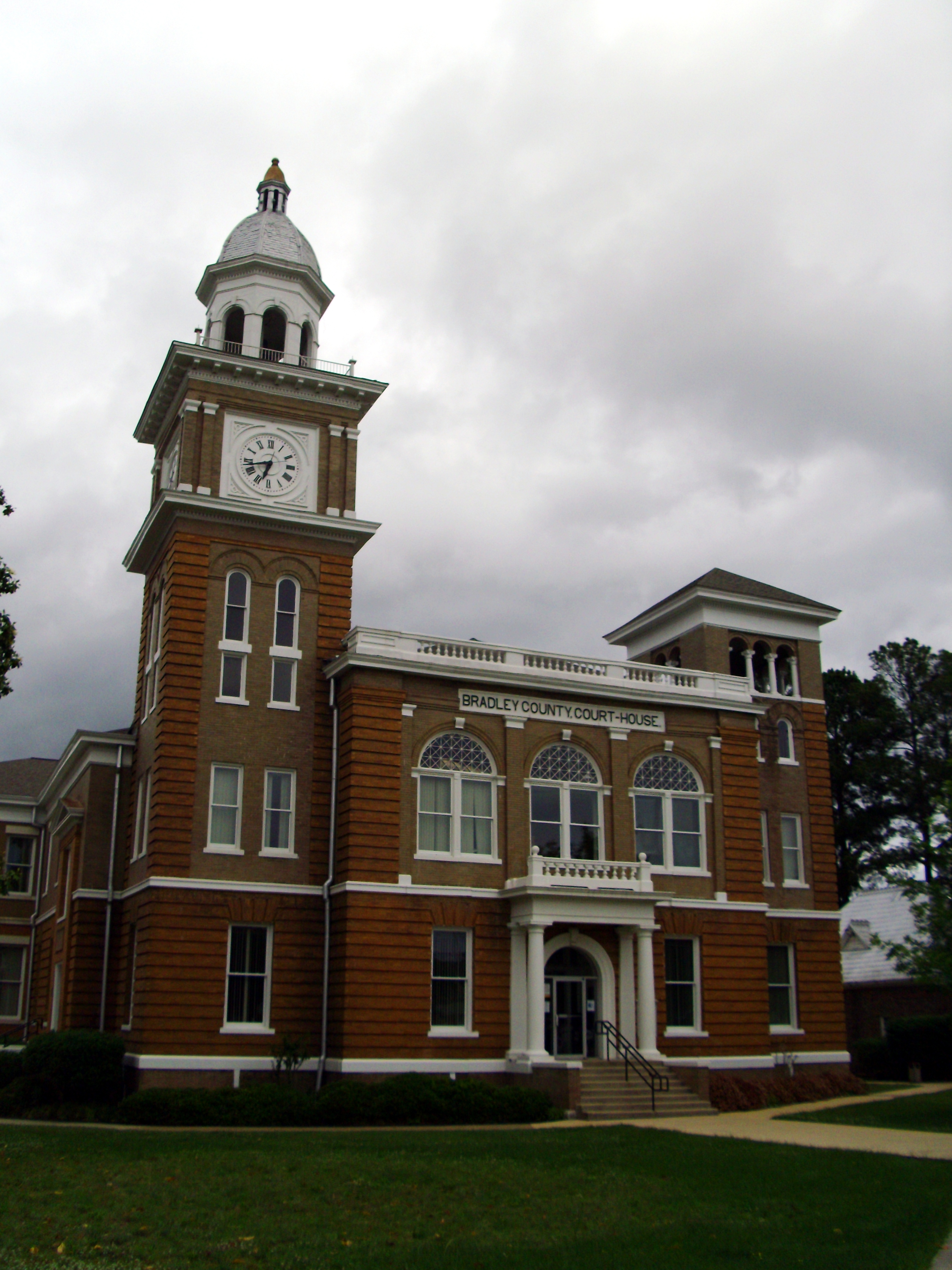
- Bradley County Courthouse and Clerk's Office in downtown Warren

- Seal

- Location of Warren in Bradley County, Arkansas.
- Coordinates: 33°37′20″N 92°04′12″W
- Country: United States
- State: Arkansas
- County: Bradley

Area
  - Total: 7.06 sq mi (18.28 km^{2})
  - Land: 7.03 sq mi (18.22 km^{2})
  - Water: 0.023 sq mi (0.06 km^{2})
- Elevation: 223 ft (68 m)

Population (2020)
  - Total: 5,453
  - Estimate (2025): 5,146 ▼
  - Density: 775.2/sq mi (299.29/km^{2})
- Time zone: UTC-6 (Central (CST))
  - Summer (DST): UTC-5 (CDT)
- ZIP code: 71671
- Area code: 870
- FIPS code: 05-73310
- GNIS feature ID: 2405674
- Website: cityofwarren.us

Warren is a city in and the county seat of Bradley County, Arkansas, United States. As of the 2020 census, Warren had a population of 5,453.

== History ==
When settlers from the east began to arrive in south Arkansas, the land was inhabited by the indigenous tribe known as the Quapaw. The earliest cession of territory was made in 1818, with a later boundary against the neighboring Choctaw tribe in 1820, opening up the southeastern corner of the Arkansas Territory for settlement. Although the area had been settled by European-Americans for approximately thirty years, the city itself was not incorporated until 1851. Tradition says the city is named after a former slave, freed by Captain Hugh Bradley, the namesake of the county and leader of the main early settlement party which established the city. The original plat was laid out on land donated by Isaac Pennington, a key member of Bradley's company.

The Missouri Pacific Railroad map dated 1891 shows a railroad to Warren. A main railroad line ran between Pine Bluff, Arkansas and Monroe, Louisiana with spurs to Warren, Arkansas and Arkansas City, Arkansas.

Around the turn of the twentieth century, Warren found itself in the middle of a boom in the timber industry. In March 1901, the Arkansas Lumber Company with headquarters in Warren was incorporated by Moses Rittenhouse and John Embree. In Sept. 1901, the Bradley Lumber Company of Warren was created by Samuel Holmes Fullerton of St. Louis, MO. In 1902, the Southern Lumber Company of Warren was created.

During the 1950s, Potlatch Forests Inc. purchased the Bradley Lumber Company and Southern Lumber Company. The Arkansas Lumber Company went out of business.

Timber and lumber continues to be important to the city's economy, although the lumber yards that were vital to Warren throughout the past century are no longer in operation.

The city's Victorian-era courthouse was originally built in 1903 and still maintains the exterior character, despite necessary refurbishments to the interior offices and courtroom.

== Geography ==
Warren is located in northeast Bradley County on high ground 2 miles (3 km) west of the Saline River, a tributary of the Ouachita River. U.S. Route 63 passes through the center of the city, leading north 46 miles (74 km) to Pine Bluff and southwest 50 miles (80 km) to El Dorado. U.S. Route 278 bypasses Warren to the south and leads east 16 miles (26 km) to Monticello and west 26 miles (42 km) to Hampton.

According to the United States Census Bureau, Warren has a total area of 7.2 square miles (18.7 km^{2}), of which 0.023 square miles (0.06 km^{2}), or 0.33%, is water.

=== Climate ===
The climate in this area is characterized by hot, humid summers and generally mild to cool winters. According to the Köppen Climate Classification system, Warren has a humid subtropical climate, abbreviated "Cfa" on climate maps. Tornadoes have occurred on at least two occasions. The first occurred on January 3, 1949, killing 55 people and injuring 435. On March 28, 1975, another tornado killed seven people and injured 51. Both were rated F4 on the Fujita scale.

Climate data for Warren, Arkansas (1991–2020 normals, extremes 1893–2011)
Month	Jan	Feb	Mar	Apr	May	Jun	Jul	Aug	Sep	Oct	Nov	Dec	Year
Record high °F (°C)	83 (28)	88 (31)	95 (35)	94 (34)	101 (38)	110 (43)	112 (44)	111 (44)	107 (42)	98 (37)	89 (32)	84 (29)	112 (44)
Mean maximum °F (°C)	71.8 (22.1)	75.7 (24.3)	81.9 (27.7)	85.6 (29.8)	89.3 (31.8)	94.2 (34.6)	98.0 (36.7)	98.6 (37.0)	94.8 (34.9)	88.1 (31.2)	79.9 (26.6)	73.2 (22.9)	99.8 (37.7)
Mean daily maximum °F (°C)	52.4 (11.3)	56.7 (13.7)	65.3 (18.5)	73.4 (23.0)	80.5 (26.9)	87.7 (30.9)	91.0 (32.8)	90.8 (32.7)	85.5 (29.7)	75.5 (24.2)	63.4 (17.4)	55.0 (12.8)	73.1 (22.8)
Daily mean °F (°C)	42.4 (5.8)	46.0 (7.8)	53.9 (12.2)	62.1 (16.7)	70.4 (21.3)	77.8 (25.4)	81.2 (27.3)	80.3 (26.8)	74.4 (23.6)	63.4 (17.4)	52.3 (11.3)	45.1 (7.3)	62.4 (16.9)
Mean daily minimum °F (°C)	32.3 (0.2)	35.2 (1.8)	42.5 (5.8)	50.8 (10.4)	60.2 (15.7)	67.9 (19.9)	71.4 (21.9)	69.8 (21.0)	63.3 (17.4)	51.3 (10.7)	41.3 (5.2)	35.1 (1.7)	51.8 (11.0)
Mean minimum °F (°C)	15.7 (−9.1)	19.6 (−6.9)	25.8 (−3.4)	34.1 (1.2)	45.7 (7.6)	56.5 (13.6)	62.7 (17.1)	60.9 (16.1)	46.4 (8.0)	35.0 (1.7)	26.1 (−3.3)	18.0 (−7.8)	12.3 (−10.9)
Record low °F (°C)	−8 (−22)	−10 (−23)	12 (−11)	26 (−3)	34 (1)	46 (8)	53 (12)	48 (9)	36 (2)	22 (−6)	12 (−11)	0 (−18)	−10 (−23)
Average precipitation inches (mm)	4.71 (120)	4.83 (123)	6.16 (156)	6.69 (170)	5.50 (140)	4.00 (102)	3.32 (84)	4.87 (124)	3.59 (91)	4.60 (117)	4.38 (111)	6.46 (164)	59.11 (1,501)
Average snowfall inches (cm)	1.0 (2.5)	0.3 (0.76)	0.2 (0.51)	0.0 (0.0)	0.0 (0.0)	0.0 (0.0)	0.0 (0.0)	0.0 (0.0)	0.0 (0.0)	0.0 (0.0)	0.0 (0.0)	0.0 (0.0)	1.5 (3.8)
Average precipitation days (≥ 0.01 in)	11.1	9.9	10.7	9.1	9.8	9.1	8.6	6.9	6.9	7.8	8.9	10.5	109.3
Average snowy days (≥ 0.1 in)	0.2	0.2	0.0	0.0	0.0	0.0	0.0	0.0	0.0	0.0	0.0	0.0	0.4
Source: NOAA (mean maxima/minima 1981–2010)

== Arts and culture ==
=== Annual cultural events ===
The Bradley County Pink Tomato Festival is held yearly in Warren, normally the second week of June. Begun in 1956, the festival is one of Arkansas' longest-running annual community festivals. Organized by the Bradley County Chamber of Commerce, the festival celebrates the South Arkansas Vine Ripe Pink Tomato, a special variety of tomato which holds the distinction of being Arkansas' state fruit and state vegetable.

== Education ==
Public education for early childhood, elementary and secondary school students is provided by Warren School District. There are five schools within the school district; a preschool, two elementary schools (k-3rd grade & 4th-5th grade), a middle school (6th-8th grades), and a high school (9th-12th grades). Students at Warren High School have the opportunity to enroll at SEACBEC, a local community college and vocational school, which offers courses in computer information technologies, construction, nursing, welding, etc.

Every year SEACBEC takes a group of students to the SkillsUSA Convention in Hot Springs to compete against other schools.

== Library ==
The Southeast Arkansas Public Library operates the Warren Branch Library.

== School athletics ==
Warren High School's athletic emblem and mascot is The Fightin' Lumberjacks. The Junior High sports teams are known as the Jr. Jacks. The school colors are orange and black. The Warren Lumberjacks are 4 time state champions in football. The Lumberjack football team won the Class AAA State Championship in 2001, 2002, and Class 4A Championship in 2014, and 2016. The Warren Lumberjack football program now has 18 conference championships. They were also the 2006, 2013, and 2017 Class 4A State Runner-up in Football. The Lumberjack baseball team were the Class AAA State Champions in 2005. Warren also holds state titles in basketball(1931), boys track(1994), girls tennis(1993), and girls track(1992 and 1994)and Soccer(2018). After the 2015 football season, the school district announced that synthetic turf would replace the natural grass field at Jim Hurley Jr Stadium. It was completed in the summer of 2016. With a traditional powerhouse football team and growing soccer program, Lumberjack field will be a premiere venue in southeast Arkansas. The Warren Soccer Jacks advanced to their first state championship match in 2017 finishing runner up. In 2018, they captured their first class 4A state soccer title. With the addition of the 2018 state title in soccer, that brings the Warren High School state title count to 18 state championships.

== Demographics ==
Historical population
Census	Pop.	Note	%±
1880	301		—
1890	492		63.5%
1900	954		93.9%
1910	2,057		115.6%
1920	2,145		4.3%
1930	2,523		17.6%
1940	2,516		−0.3%
1950	2,615		3.9%
1960	6,752		158.2%
1970	6,433		−4.7%
1980	7,646		18.9%
1990	6,455		−15.6%
2000	6,442		−0.2%
2010	6,003		−6.8%
2020	5,453		−9.2%
2025 (est.)	5,146	▼	−5.6%
U.S. Decennial Census

=== 2020 census ===
As of the 2020 census, Warren had a population of 5,453, with 2,261 households and 1,344 families residing in the city.

The median age was 38.4 years. 26.4% of residents were under the age of 18 and 17.6% were 65 years of age or older. For every 100 females there were 90.7 males, and for every 100 females age 18 and over there were 84.5 males.

Of residents, 96.4% lived in urban areas and 3.6% lived in rural areas.

Of Warren households, 32.6% had children under the age of 18 living in them. 32.1% were married-couple households, 21.2% were households with a male householder and no spouse or partner present, and 41.6% were households with a female householder and no spouse or partner present. About 35.5% of all households were made up of individuals, and 15.5% had someone living alone who was 65 years of age or older. There were 2,623 housing units, of which 13.8% were vacant; the homeowner vacancy rate was 2.4% and the rental vacancy rate was 9.5%.

Warren racial composition
Race	Num.	Perc.
White (non-Hispanic)	1,868	34.26%
Black or African American (non-Hispanic)	2,407	44.14%
Native American	17	0.31%
Asian	21	0.39%
Other/Mixed	132	2.42%
Hispanic or Latino	1,008	18.49%

=== 2000 census ===
As of the census of 2000, the racial makeup of the city was 52.46% White, 46.79% Black or African American, 0.19% Native American, 0.08% Asian, 0.02% Pacific Islander, 3.82% from other races, and 0.65% from two or more races. 5.08% of the population were Hispanic or Latino of any race.

Out of households reporting, 29.0% had children under the age of 18 living with them, 44.6% were married couples living together, 17.9% had a female householder with no husband present, and 34.1% were non-families. 31.4% of all households were made up of individuals, and 15.6% had someone living alone who was 65 years of age or older. The average household size was 2.36 and the average family size was 2.96.

In the city, the population was spread out, with 24.0% under the age of 18, 9.0% from 18 to 24, 24.8% from 25 to 44, 21.5% from 45 to 64, and 20.8% who were 65 years of age or older. The median age was 39 years. For every 100 females, there were 84.7 males. For every 100 females age 18 and over, there were 80.6 males.

The median income for a household in the city was $22,162, and the median income for a family was $27,618. Males had a median income of $27,778 versus $17,247 for females. The per capita income for the city was $13,453. About 24.3% of families and 28.7% of the population were below the poverty line, including 37.4% of those under age 18 and 23.9% of those age 65 or over.

== Notable people ==
People from Warren:

- Robert James Baker (1942–2018), mammalogist
- Treylon Burks (born 2000), footballer
- Alex Burl (1931–2009), footballer
- Greg Childs (born 1990), footballer
- William S. Goodwin (1866–1937), lawyer
- Carroll Hollensworth (1900–1959), long-serving member of the Arkansas House of Representatives including a term as its speaker
- John Lipton (born 1936), long-serving member of the Arkansas House of Representatives
- Allen Maxwell (1943–2014), politician
- Joe Purcell (1923–1987), politician
- Rob Reep (born 1988), historian
- Marshall Riddle (1918–1988), baseball player
- Carson Ross (born 1946), mayor of Blue Springs, Missouri
- Chester Turner (born 1966), serial killer
- Robert Terry Wilson (born 1949), musician
- Jarius Wright (born 1989), wide receiver in the NFL

== See also ==
- Bradley County, Arkansas
- Warren School District
