= Ederington House =

Historic house in Arkansas, United States

- U.S. National Register of Historic Places
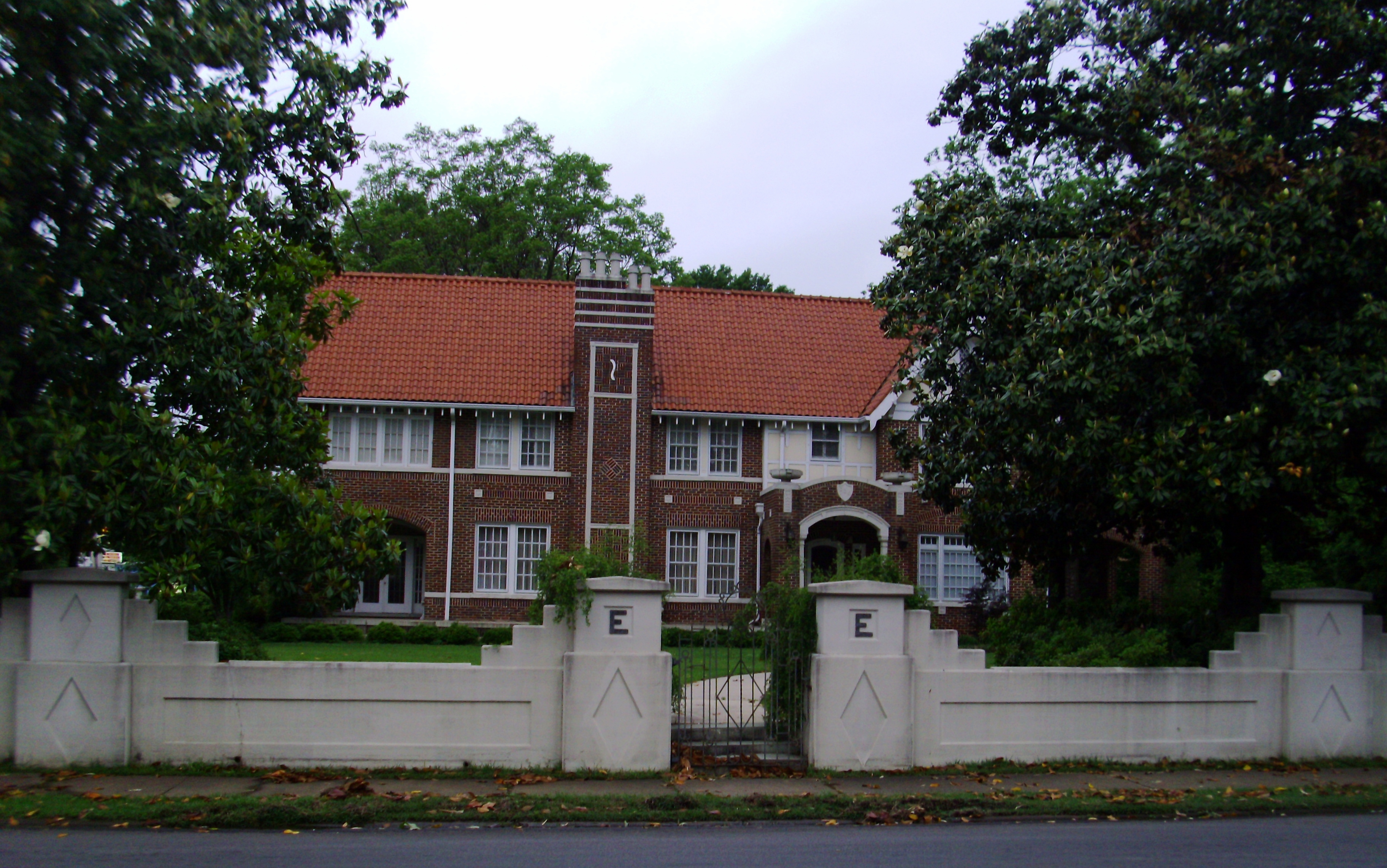

- Location within Arkansas Location within the United States
- Location: 326 S. Main St., Warren, Arkansas
- Coordinates: 33°36′37″N 92°3′52″W
- Area: less than one acre
- Built: 1926
- Architect: H. Ray Burks
- Architectural style: Tudor Revival, Arts & Crafts
- NRHP reference No.: 84000660
- Added to NRHP: June 21, 1984

The Ederington House, known locally as the "E" House for the decorations on its fences, is a historic house at 326 South Main Street in Warren, Arkansas. It was built in 1926-27 for Louis Ederington, a local shopowner. It was designed by H. Ray Burks, an architect of some local reputation whose other designs include the Blankinship Motor Company Building and the Drew County Courthouse. This house is one of a few definitely attributed to Burks, and is set on imposing grounds in central Warren. The house is built primarily of red brick, with stucco gable ends and cast stone trim details. The property is lined on two sides by a concrete fencing with iron gates. The posts flanking the driveway and lining the fence are topped by large bronze "E"s.

The house was listed on the National Register of Historic Places in 1979.

== See also ==
- National Register of Historic Places listings in Bradley County, Arkansas
