= H. Ray Burks =

American architect (1889–1948)

- Born: June 26, 1889; Monticello, Arkansas
- Died: March 17, 1948 (aged 58); Little Rock, Arkansas
- Occupation: Architect
- Practice: H. Ray Burks; Burks & Anderson

Selected works

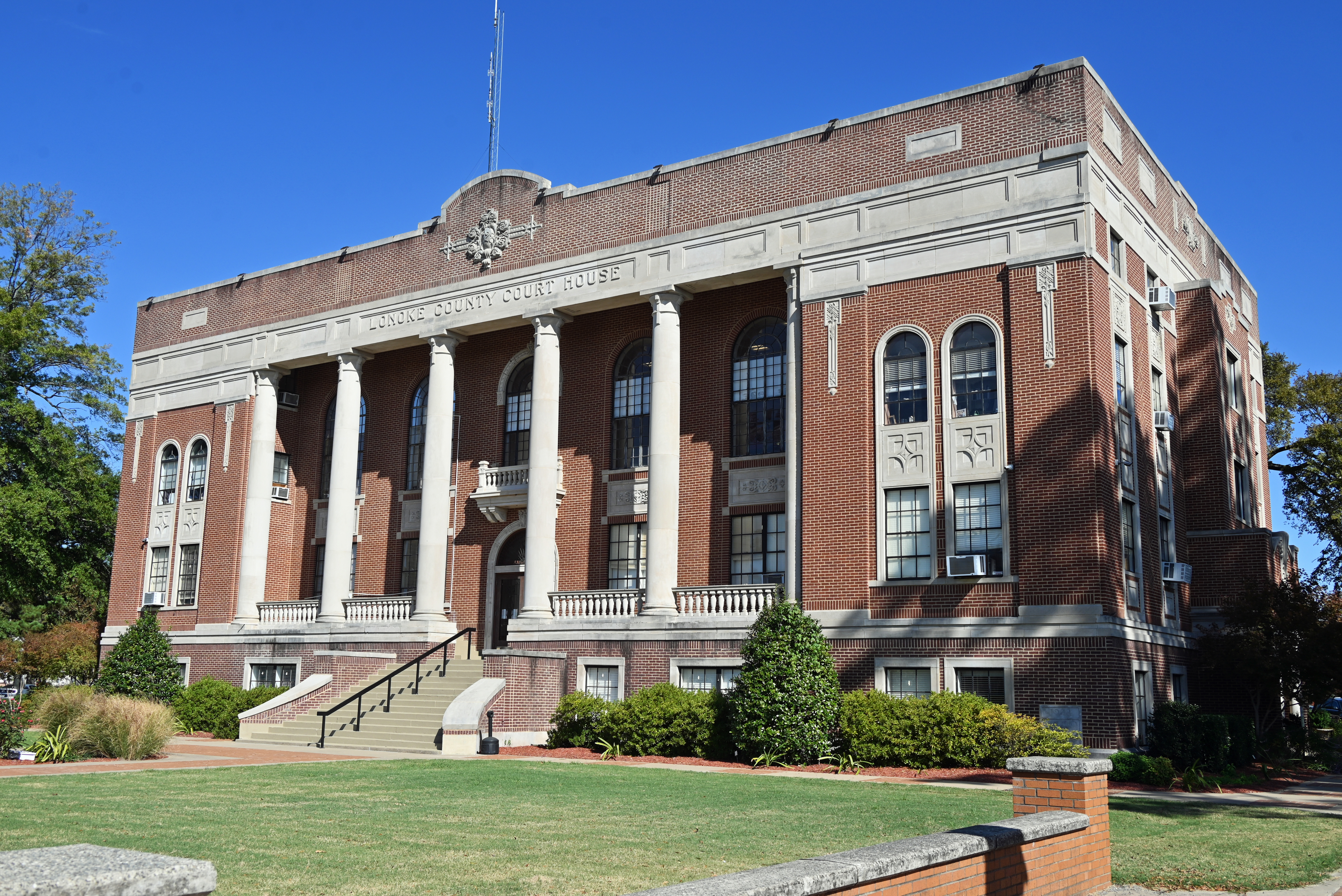
The Lonoke County Courthouse in Lonoke, Colonial Revival (1928)

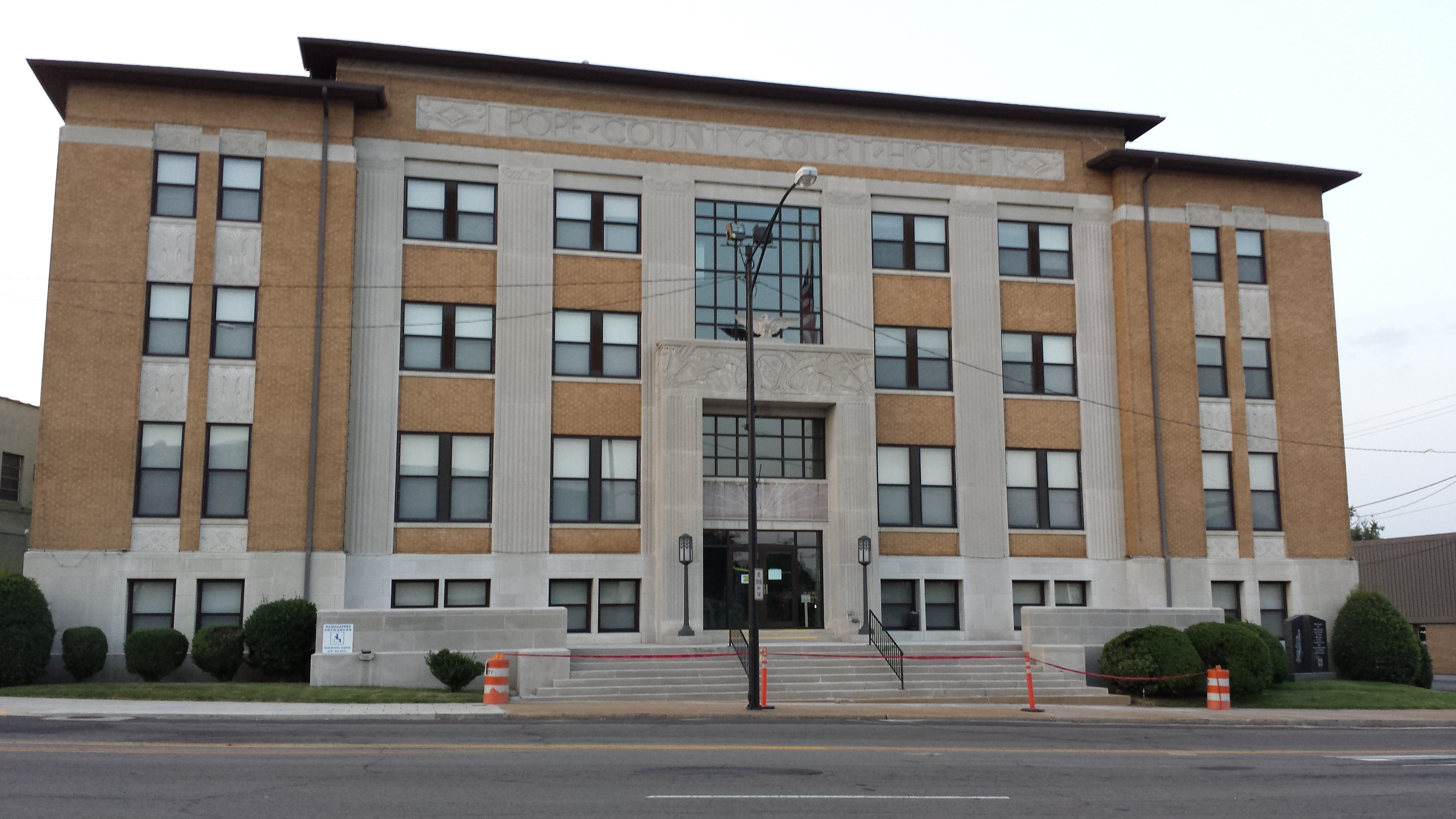
The Pope County Courthouse in Russellville, Art Deco (1931)

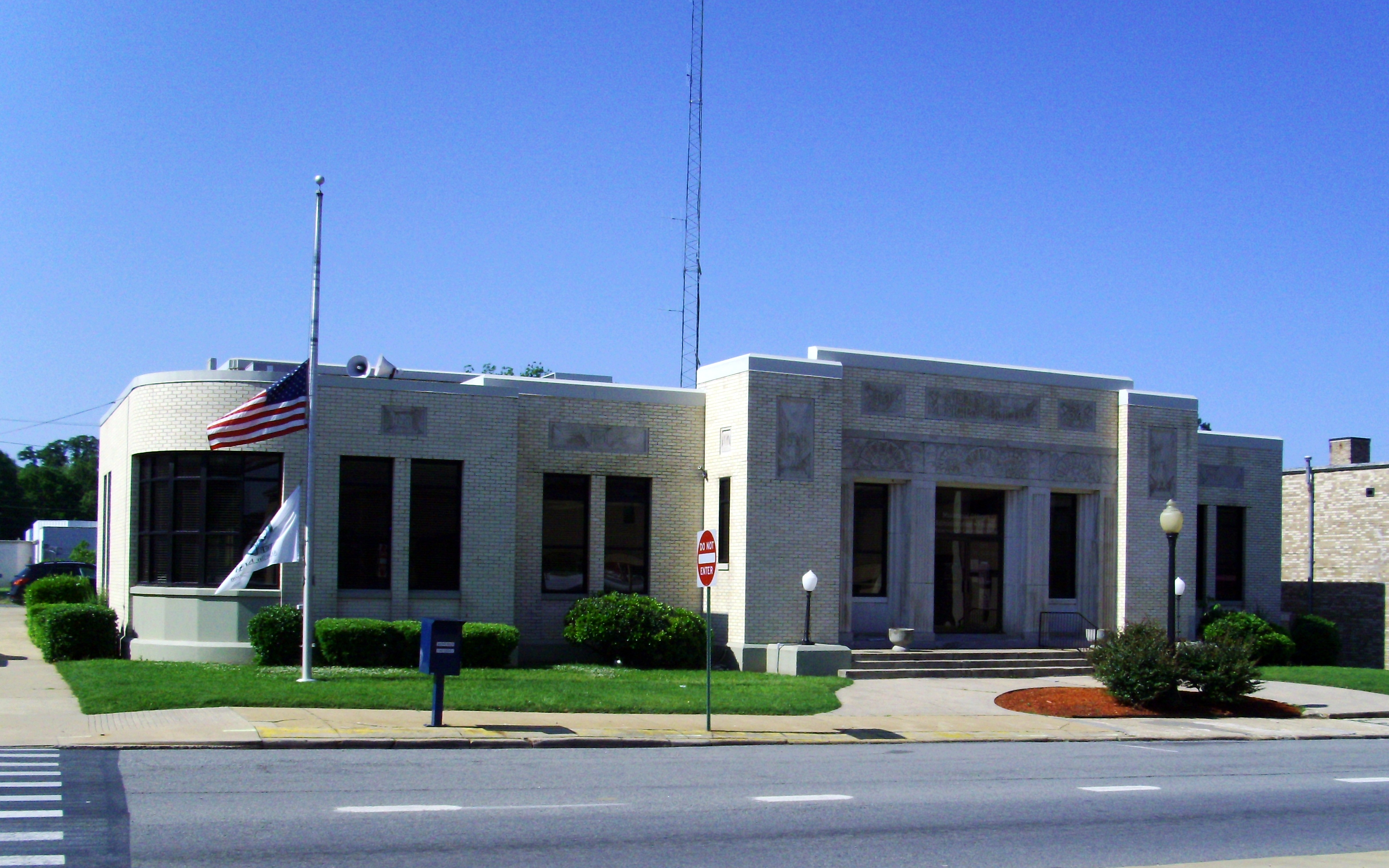
Monticello City Hall, Art Deco (1934)

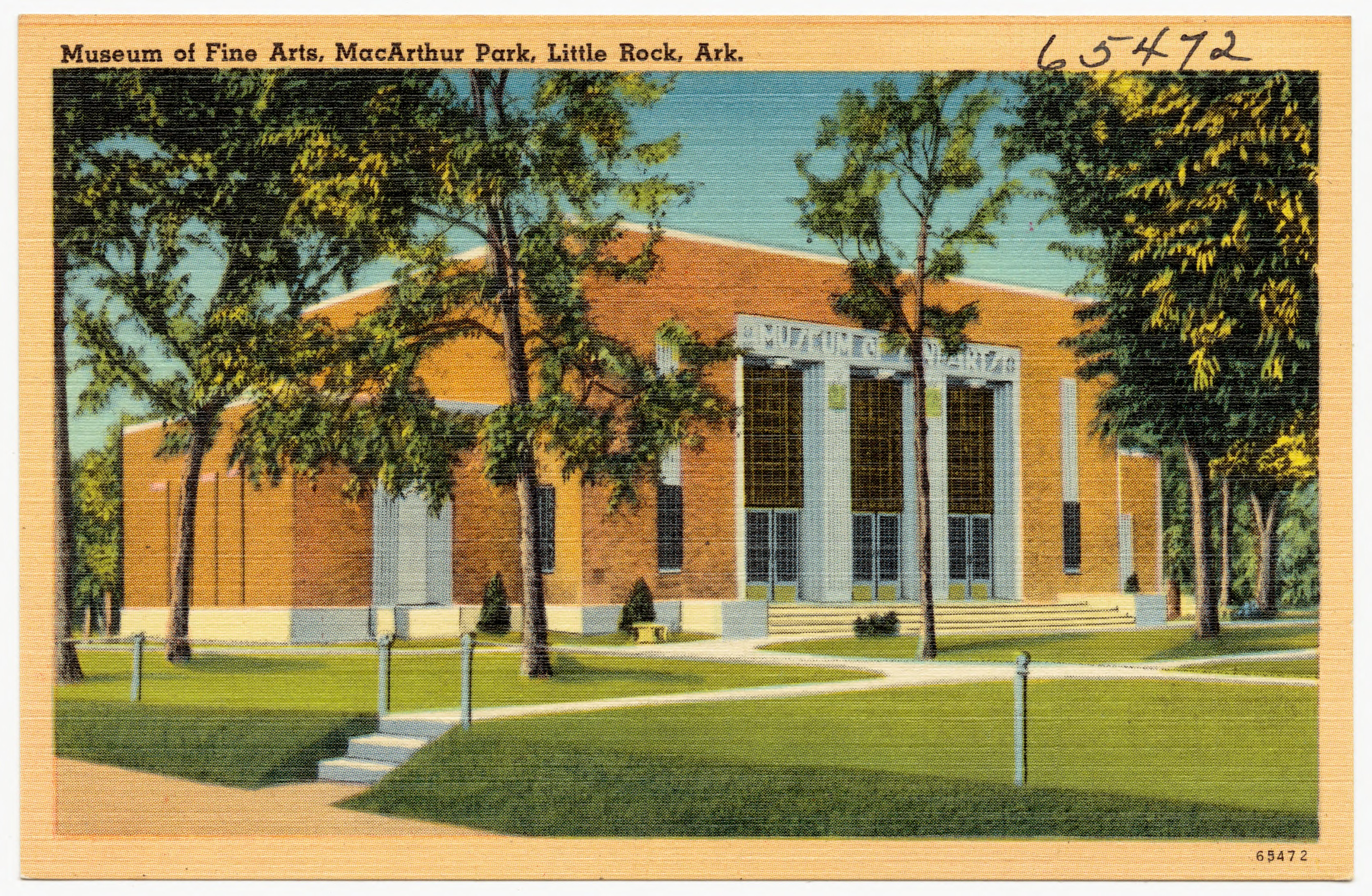
Arkansas Museum of Fine Arts in Little Rock, Art Deco (1937)

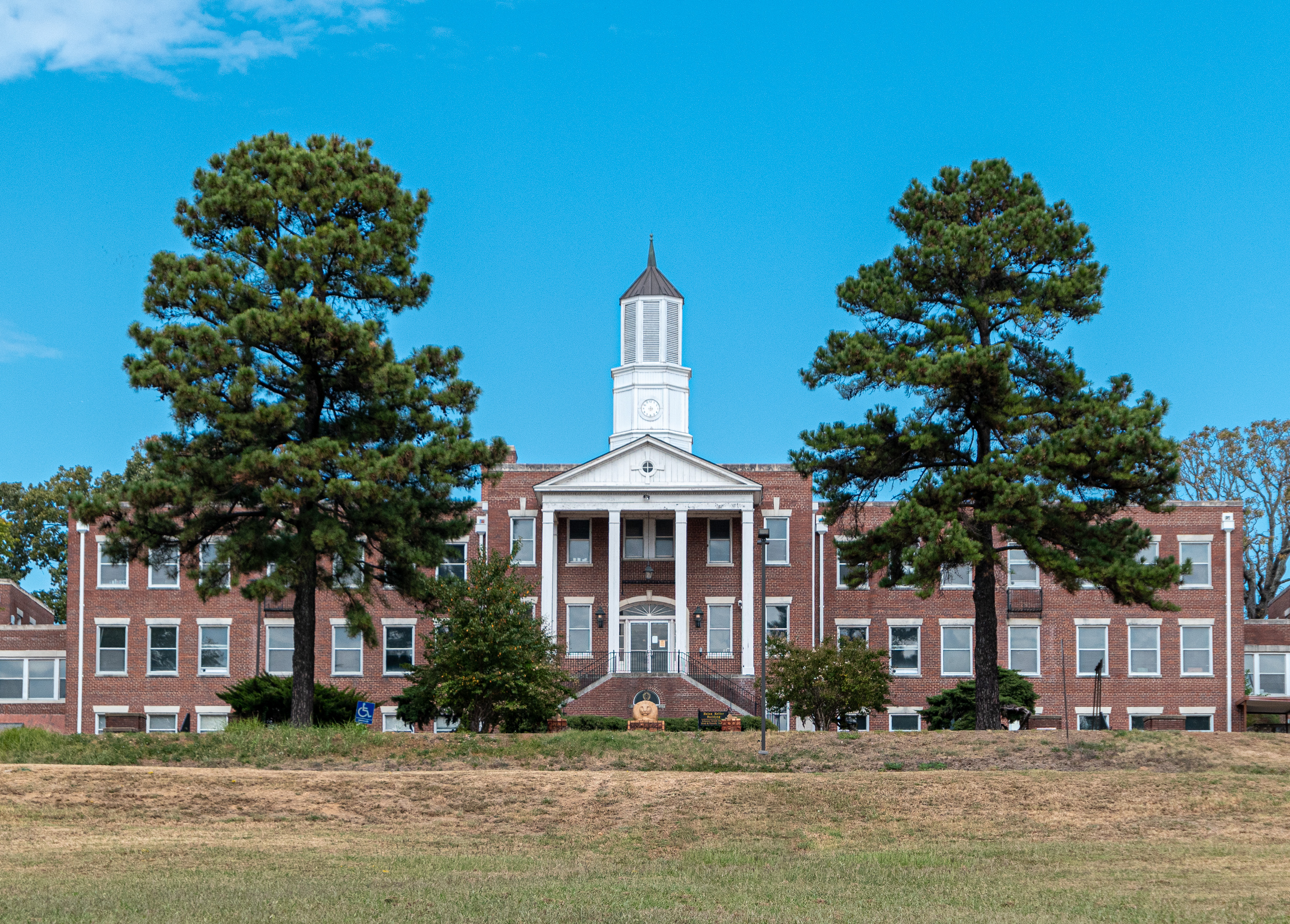
Arkansas School for the Blind and Visually Impaired, Colonial Revival (1939)

Harvey Ray Burks AIA (July 26, 1889 – March 17, 1948) was an American architect in practice in Little Rock, Arkansas from 1922 until his death in 1948. Burks developed a substantial, statewide practice and was responsible for the design of county courthouses, municipal and institutional buildings and the original Arkansas Museum of Fine Arts.

== Life and career ==
Harvey Ray Burks was born July 26, 1889, in Monticello. He was educated in the Monticello public schools and at Washington University in St. Louis. In 1915 he joined the office of Monticello architect W. A. Halley before moving to Little Rock in 1917, where he worked for architect James A. Bliss. With the exception of service during World War I, Burks remained with Bliss until he opened his own office in 1922. Burks developed a statewide practice, designing the Arkansas Museum of Fine Arts in Little Rock as well as courthouses, schools and other large projects. In 1945 he formed the partnership of Burks & Anderson with Bruce R. Anderson. At the time of his death the firm was beginning design work for the restoration of the Old State House.

== Personal life ==
Burks was married and had one son. He was a member of the American Institute of Architects (AIA), local fraternal and social organizations and the First Presbyterian Church. He died March 17, 1948 in Little Rock at the age of 58.

== Legacy ==
After Burks' death, his colleagues in the AIA eulogized him as "one of the outstanding architects who have practiced in the State of Arkansas ... [he gave] to his work in architecture a feeling of color, balance and harmony which can best be appreciated by observing his many outstanding buildings and tasteful homes throughout the State. As was spoken of another eminent architect, 'If you seek his monuments, look about you,' also, appropriately, do we speak of H. Ray Burks."

Burks' practice was continued by his partner, Anderson, under his own name. His work included major projects for the University of Central Arkansas, Harding University and Ouachita Baptist University. He died in 1985.

At least seven buildings designed by Burks have been listed on the United States National Register of Historic Places, and others contribute to listed historic districts.

== Architectural works ==
=== H. Ray Burks, 1922–1945 ===
- 1925 – Arkansas Baptist Hospital, (Note: Demolished.) 12th and Marshall Sts, Little Rock, Arkansas
- 1927 – Agriculture Building, (Note: Designed by Jamieson & Spearl, architects, with H. Ray Burks, associate architect. NRHP-listed.) University of Arkansas, Fayetteville, Arkansas
- 1927 – Ederington House, (Note: NRHP-listed.) 326 S Main St, Warren, Arkansas
- 1927 – Joe Storthz house, 450 N Midland St, Little Rock, Arkansas
- 1928 – Lonoke County Courthouse, 301 N Center St, Lonoke, Arkansas
- 1931 – Pope County Courthouse, (Note: A contributing resource to the Russellville Downtown Historic District, NRHP-listed in 1996.) 100 W Main St, Russellville, Arkansas
- 1931 – Warren Municipal Building, (Note: A contributing resource to the Warren Commercial Historic District, NRHP-listed in 2016.) 104 Myrtle St, Warren, Arkansas
- 1932 – Arkansas County Courthouse-Southern District, (Note: NRHP-listed, also a contributing resource to the DeWitt Commercial Historic District, NRHP-listed in 2010.) 101 Court St, DeWitt, Arkansas
- 1932 – Drew County Courthouse, 210 S Main St, Monticello, Arkansas
- 1934 – Monticello City Hall, 203 W Gaines St, Monticello, Arkansas
- 1935 – University of Arkansas Medical School (former), (Note: Now the William H. Bowen School of Law.) 1201 McMath Ave, Little Rock, Arkansas
- 1937 – Arkansas Museum of Fine Arts, 501 E 9th St, Little Rock, Arkansas
- 1939 – Arkansas School for the Blind and Visually Impaired, 2600 W Markham St, Little Rock, Arkansas
- 1940 – Blankinship Motor Company Building, (Note: NRHP-listed, also a contributing resource to the Warren Commercial Historic District, NRHP-listed in 2016.) 120 E Cypress St, Warren, Arkansas
- 1941 – Hotel Freiderica expansion, (Note: Designed by H. Ray Burks, architect, with Edward Durell Stone, consulting architect. Designed principally by Stone. NRHP-listed.) 625 W Capitol Ave, Little Rock, Arkansas
- 1942 – Arkansas Museum of Natural History and Antiquities (former), (Note: The conversion of the former Tower Building of the Little Rock Arsenal, now the MacArthur Museum of Arkansas Military History.) 503 E 9th St, Little Rock, Arkansas
- 1943 – Camp Como, (Note: Designed by the Associated Architects and Engineers for Governmental Service, made up of architects H. Ray Burks, Erhart & Eichenbaum, Wittenberg & Delony and Theodore M. Sanders and engineers MacCrea–Bair–Lefever.) Panola County, Mississippi

=== Burks & Anderson, 1945–1948 ===
- 1947 – Stebbins and Roberts Office Building and Factory, 1300 E 6th St, Little Rock, Arkansas
- 1948 – War Memorial Stadium, 1 Stadium Dr, Little Rock, Arkansas
