= North Washington Street Bridge =

North Washington Street Bridge may refer to the following bridges in the United States:

- North Washington Street Bridge, former official name of the Bill Russell Bridge in Boston, Massachusetts
- North Washington Street Bridge (DeWitt), a historic bridge in DeWitt, Arkansas
