= Blankinship Motor Company Building =

- U.S. National Register of Historic Places
- U.S. Historic district – Contributing property
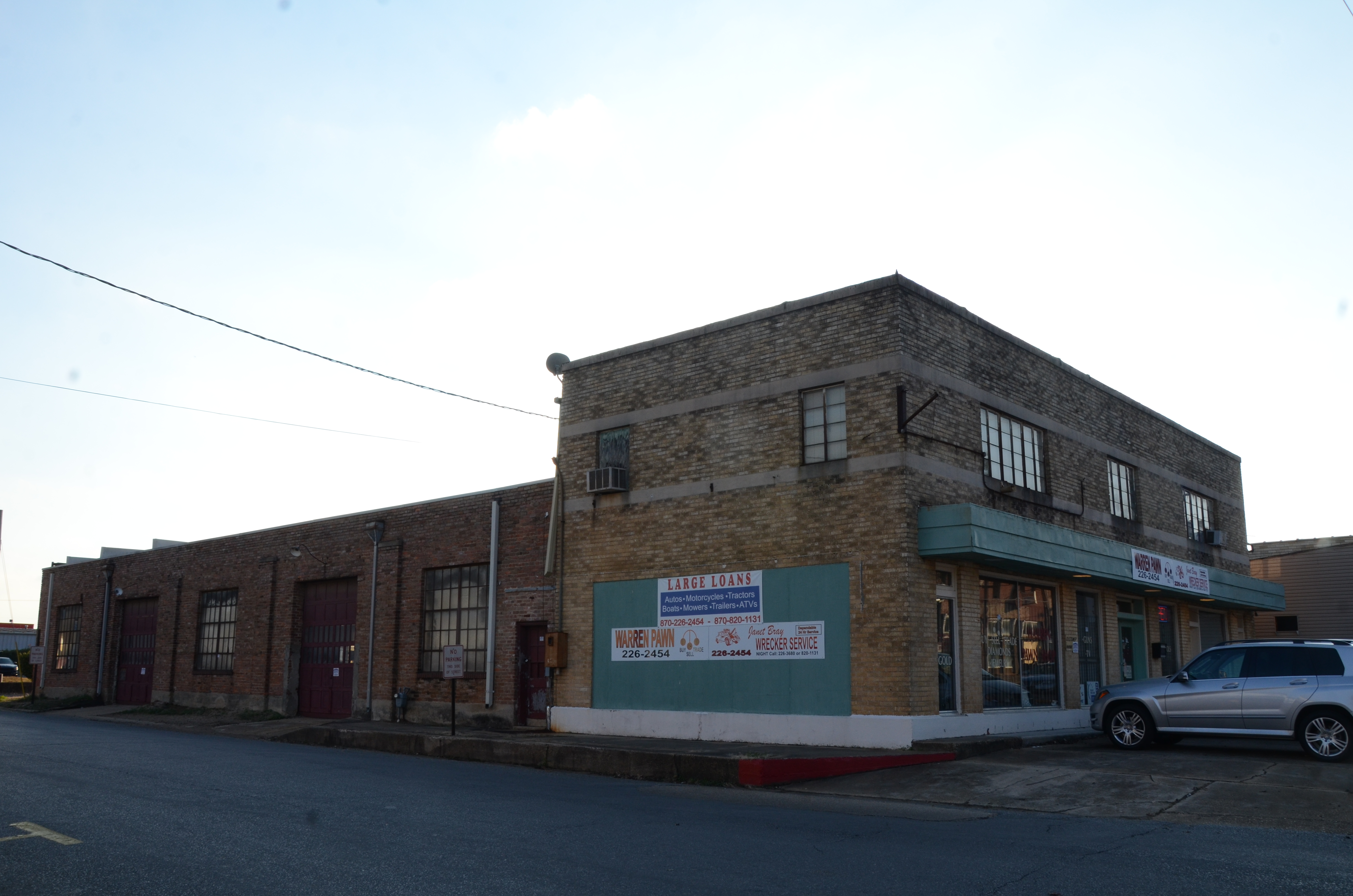

- Location within Arkansas Location within the United States
- Location: 120 E. Cypress St., Warren, Arkansas
- Coordinates: 33°36′51″N 92°3′52″W
- Area: less than one acre
- Built: 1940
- Architect: H. Ray Burks
- Architectural style: Moderne
- Part of: Warren Commercial Historic District (ID16000433)
- MPS: Arkansas Highway History and Architecture MPS
- NRHP reference No.: 01001190

Significant dates
- Added to NRHP: November 2, 2001
- Designated CP: July 11, 2016

The Blankinship Motor Company Building is a historic auto dealership building at 120 East Cypress Street in Warren, Arkansas. Its construction in 1940 was heralded as part of an "era of progress", as the Art Moderne building supplanted a horse barn on the site. The building was designed by H. Ray Burks, whose other commissions included the Lonoke County Courthouse and the Drew County Courthouse. The building was used as a Ford, Mercury and Lincoln dealership and service station until 1965, when the dealership closed. It continued to operate as a service center until 1982, after which it has had a succession of other uses.

The building was listed on the National Register of Historic Places in 2001.

== See also ==
- National Register of Historic Places listings in Bradley County, Arkansas
