= Dewitt Airport =

Dewitt Airport or DeWitt Airport may refer to:

- Dewitt Field, also known as Old Town Municipal Airport, in Old Town, Maine, United States
- DeWitt Municipal Airport in DeWitt, Arkansas, United States
- General DeWitt Spain Airport in Memphis, Tennessee, United States
