= Carlene Mitchell =

American basketball coach

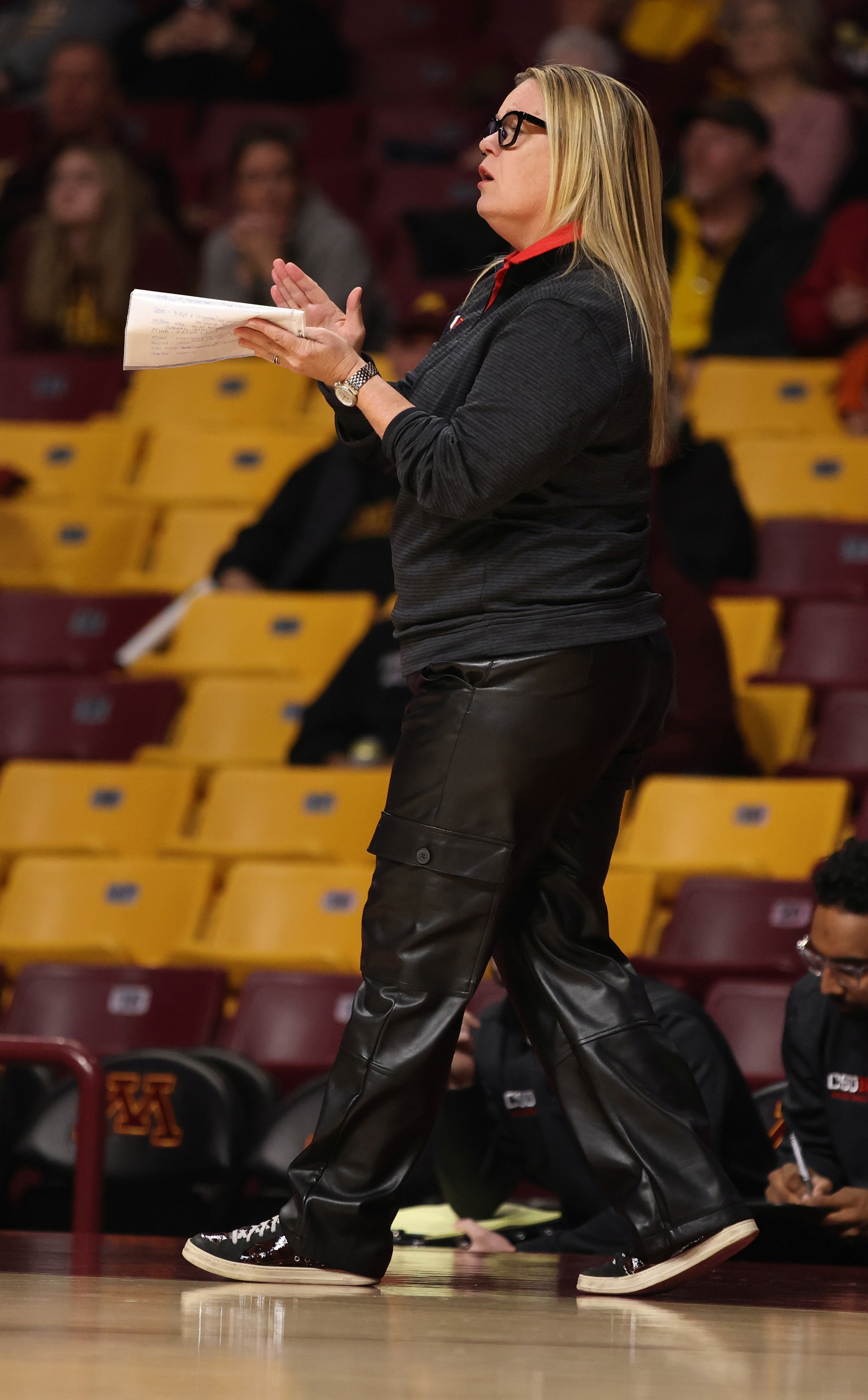
- Mitchell in 2023

Biographical details
- Born: DeWitt, Arkansas, United States

Edra Carlene Mitchell is an American college basketball coach. She was hired as interim head coach of the CSUN Matadors women's basketball team in July 2021. She was let go as CSUN women's basketball head coach in March of 2024. She was previously the assistant coach of the American basketball team Chicago Sky of the WNBA and the former head coach of the women's basketball program at UC Santa Barbara. Before taking her first head coaching job with the Gauchos, Mitchell spent 10 years as an assistant coach to C. Vivian Stringer at Rutgers University, spending her last three years as associate head coach.

== Early life and education ==
Mitchell was born in DeWitt, Arkansas. She began her college playing career at Trinity Valley Community College where she won a national title during her second season (1993–94). She also set the NJCAA record for most assists in a single season (337) and most assists in a game (17) during the national championship season with the Cardinals. She made the jump to NCAA Division I basketball when she transferred to Kansas State University. She started at point guard her senior year with the Wildcats (1995–96).

== Coaching career ==
At UC Santa Barbara Mitchell became the fifth head coach in Gaucho history on May 19, 2011. She replaced Lindsay Gottlieb who left the program to become the head coach for the women's basketball team at the University of California, Berkeley.

In her first season with the Gauchos, she led her team on an historic run to capture the Big West Championship as the sixth seeded team in the conference tournament. During that run, she also saw two of her players earn spots on the All-Big West Tournament Team, sophomore guard Melissa Zornig and junior forward/center Kirsten Tilleman. Tilleman also earned Tournament MVP honors after her double-double performance in the championship game versus Long Beach State.

Mitchell also coached two of her players to Big West recognition. Senior Emilie Johnson was named to the All-Big West Second Team, the fourth time in her career she earned All-Big West honors. And sophomore guard Nicole Nesbit was named as the conference's Co-Sixth Player of the Year and was also an All-Big West Honorable Mention.

While at Rutgers, Mitchell helped coach the team to an NCAA Tournament berth in nine straight seasons and a spot in the NCAA regional semifinals in five of her last seven seasons. Mitchell, who served as the program's recruiting coordinator since 2004, consistently landed the top talent in the nation, including four top-15 recruiting classes and the nation's top recruiting class in 2006–07.

Prior to her time with the Scarlet Knights, Mitchell spent the 2000–01 season as the top assistant coach and recruiting coordinator at Oklahoma State University. She was responsible for both preseason and off-season conditioning, coaching the guards during practices, developing a defensive game plan for each of Oklahoma State's opponents and working with the program's summer camps.

Prior to her stop in Stillwater, Mitchell coached for two seasons at Western Illinois University. While in Macomb, Ill., she helped the Westerwinds make a remarkable turnaround from a 7–19 record to an 18–11 mark the following season. Mitchell assisted in the signing of 14 student-athletes to national letters of intent. Three of those student-athletes were later named to the Mid-Continent Conference All-First Team during their respective careers.

Mitchell started her coaching career as a graduate assistant at the University of Missouri-Kansas City in 1997. Her responsibilities with the Kangaroos included implementing strength and conditioning programs, creating opponent scouting reports and organizing all team travel.

== Recognition ==
In her first year at the helm for UCSB, Mitchell turned around a team that was 8–13 midway through the season by coaching them to nine wins of their final 12 games. That comeback led to the program's 14th Big West Championship and a berth in the NCAA tournament. For that season, Mitchell was named as one of the top three finalists for the Spalding Maggie Dixon Division I Rookie Coach of the Year presented by the Women’s Basketball Coaches Association.
