= Maxwell Street Bridge =

- U.S. National Register of Historic Places
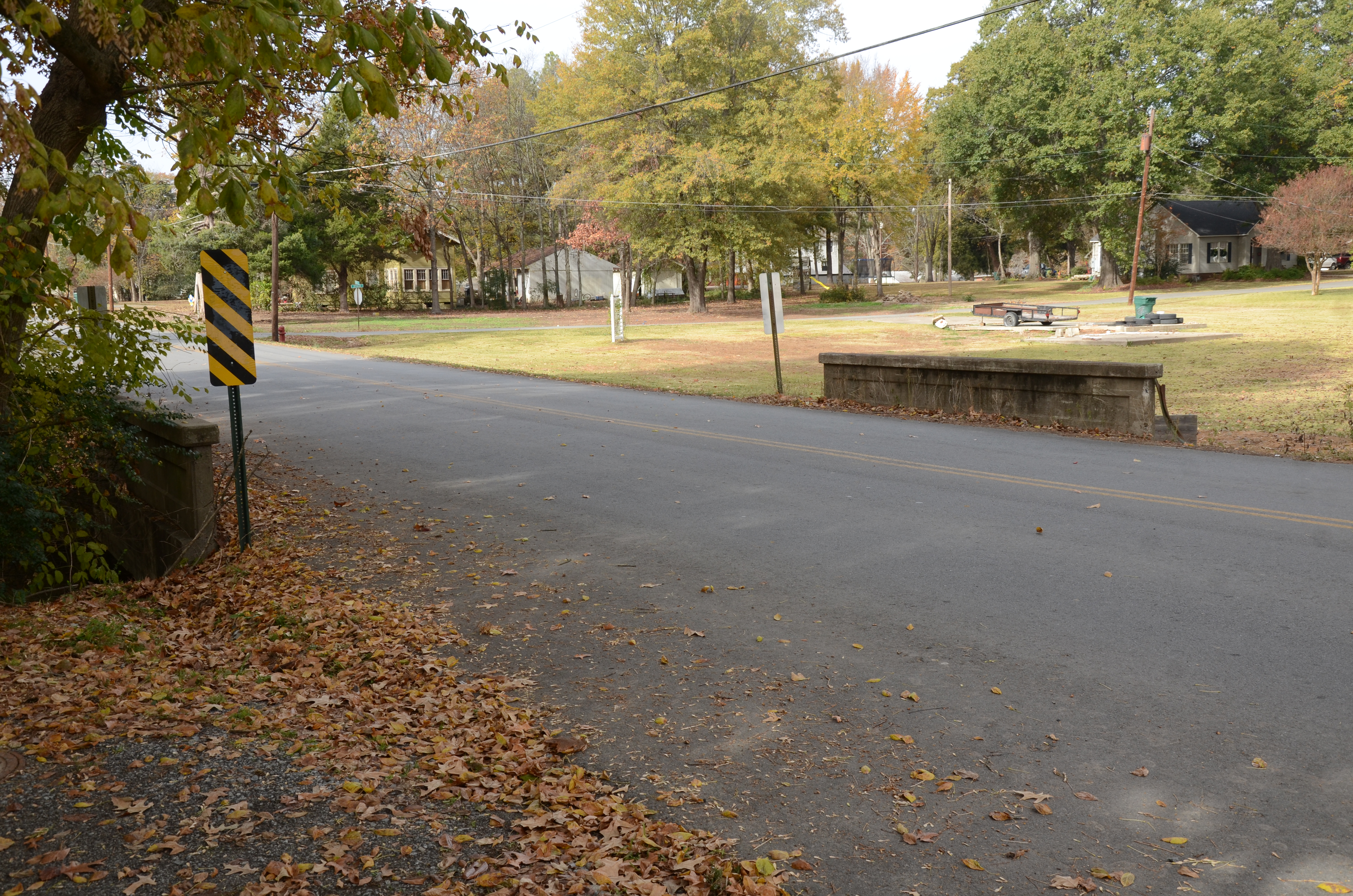

- Location within Arkansas Location within the United States
- Nearest city: De Witt, Arkansas
- Coordinates: 34°17′51″N 91°20′15″W
- Area: less than one acre
- Built: 1910
- MPS: Historic Bridges of Arkansas MPS
- NRHP reference No.: 10001148
- Added to NRHP: April 8, 2011

The Maxwell Street Bridge is a historic bridge in De Witt, Arkansas. Built c. 1910, it carries West Maxwell Avenue over a small creek, between Adams and Jefferson Streets. It consists of a single spans of steel girders, resting on concrete abutments with diagonal wing walls, and is covered with concrete decking that has an asphalt road surface. It is 20 feet (6.1 m) long and has a roadbed 30 feet (9.1 m) wide. Its guard rails consist of poured concrete panels, with incised rectangles on the side. Maxwell Avenue was originally the northernmost boundary of De Witt's street grid.

The bridge was listed on the National Register of Historic Places in 2011.

== See also ==
- North Washington Street Bridge
- North Jackson Street Bridge
- National Register of Historic Places listings in Arkansas County, Arkansas
- List of bridges on the National Register of Historic Places in Arkansas
