= Arkansas County Courthouse-Southern District =

- Arkansas County Courthouse--Southern District
- U.S. National Register of Historic Places
- U.S. Historic district – Contributing property
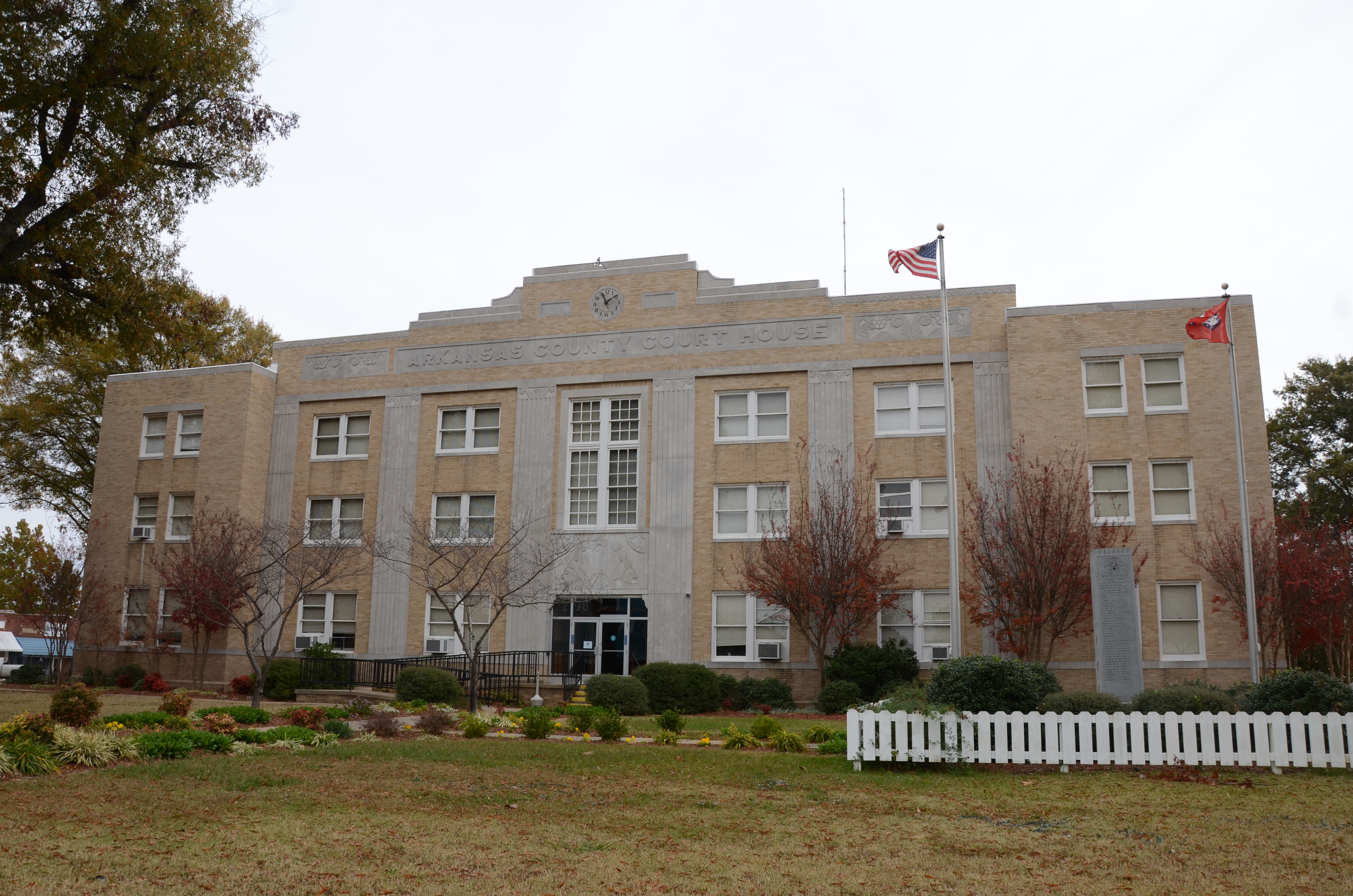

- Location within Arkansas Location within the United States
- Location: Courthouse Sq., DeWitt, Arkansas
- Coordinates: 34°17′42″N 91°20′6″W
- Area: 1.5 acres (0.61 ha)
- Built: 1931
- Built by: E. V. Bird Construction Company
- Architect: H. Ray Burks
- Architectural style: Art Deco
- Part of: DeWitt Commercial Historic District (ID10000213)
- NRHP reference No.: 92001620

Significant dates
- Added to NRHP: November 20, 1992
- Designated CP: April 27, 2010

The Arkansas County Courthouse for the Southern District is located at Courthouse Square in the center of De Witt, Arkansas, the seat for the southern county of Arkansas County. It is a three-story brick building with Art Deco styling, designed by Little Rock architect H. Ray Burks and built in 1931. It is one of the finest examples of Art Deco architecture in the state. It is built in the shape of an H, with vault additions made in 1971 the only asymmetrical element. Its main entry (on the western facade) is a simple double-leaf entry with transom window, topped by a concrete panel with floral design. This is topped by a pair of large windows, with a concrete panel with signage and clock above and a raised parapet at the top.

The building was listed on the National Register of Historic Places in 1992.

== See also ==
- National Register of Historic Places listings in Arkansas County, Arkansas
