= Halliburton House (DeWitt, Arkansas) =

Historic house in Arkansas, United States

- U.S. National Register of Historic Places
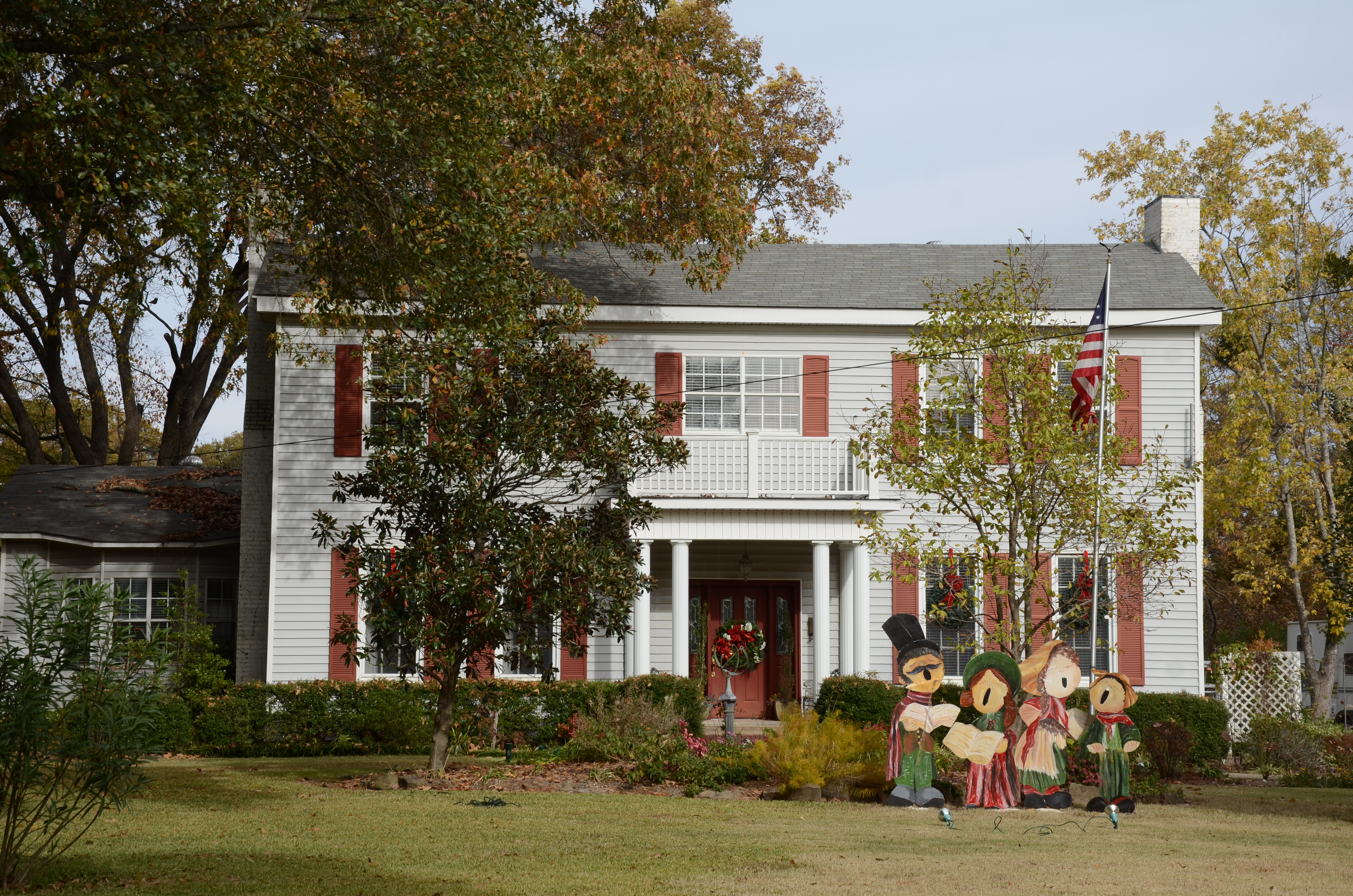

- Location within Arkansas Location within the United States
- Location: 300 W. Halliburton St., DeWitt, Arkansas
- Coordinates: 34°17′55″N 91°20′15″W
- Area: less than one acre
- Built: 1855
- NRHP reference No.: 74000464
- Added to NRHP: November 5, 1974

The Halliburton House is a historic house located at 300 West Halliburton Street in De Witt, Arkansas. It is a two-story wood-frame structure with a gable roof and end chimneys. The main facade spans five bays and features a central entry sheltered by a portico supported by paired Doric columns. The significance of the house stems from its construction and occupation in 1860 by William Henry Halliburton (1816-1912). Halliburton, as the deputy sheriff of Arkansas, played a role in overseeing the purchase of the land that eventually became De Witt in 1853, following the separation of Desha County and the relocation of the county seat. He served in various county official positions until the outbreak of the American Civil War. After a twenty-year tenure in private legal practice, he later served three terms in the state legislature.

The house was listed on the National Register of Historic Places in 1974.

== See also ==
- National Register of Historic Places listings in Arkansas County, Arkansas
