= North Jackson Street Bridge =

- North Washington Street Bridge
- U.S. National Register of Historic Places
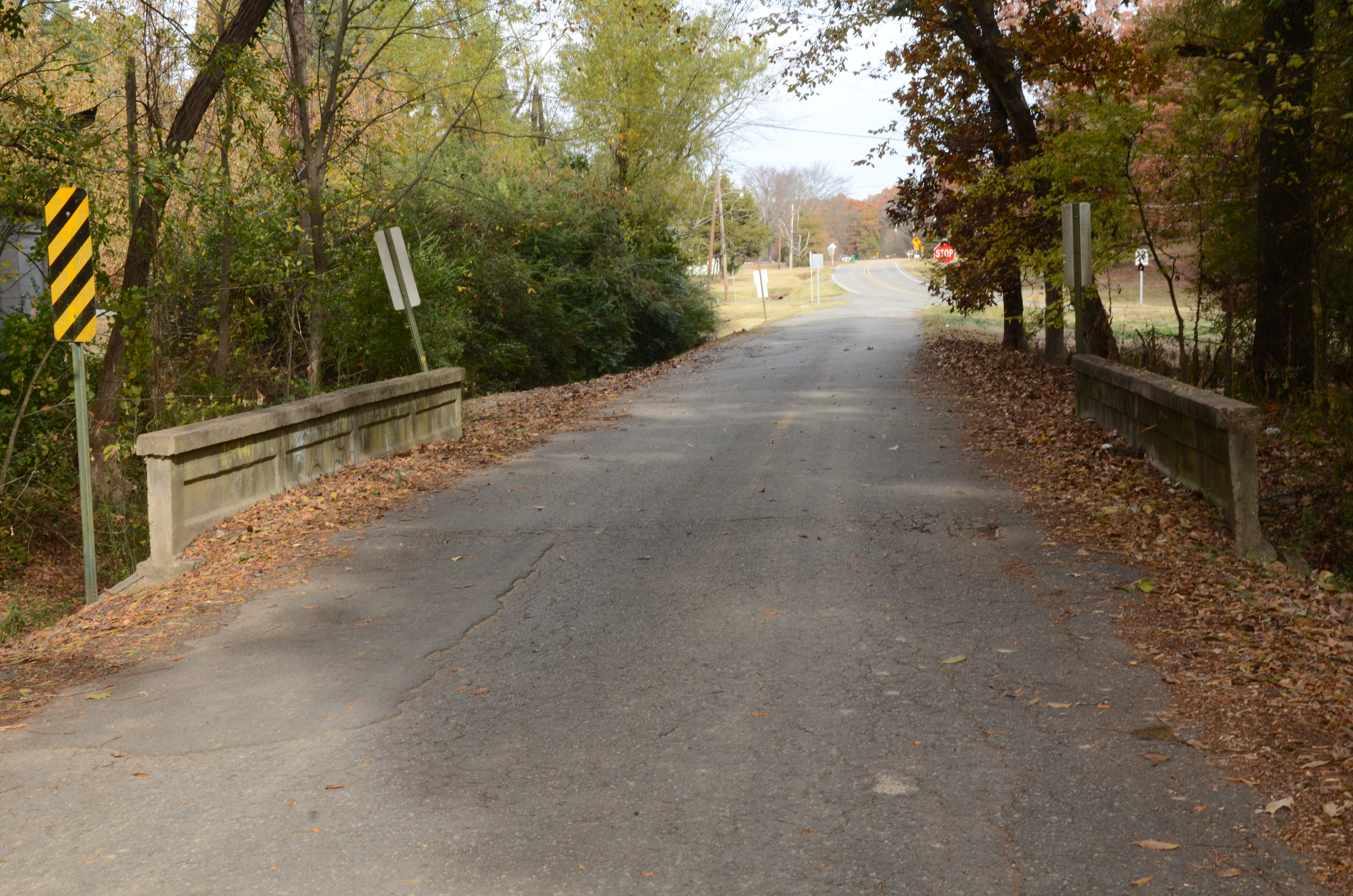

- Location within Arkansas Location within the United States
- Nearest city: De Witt, Arkansas
- Coordinates: 34.30015°N 91.34064°W
- Area: less than one acre
- Built: 1910
- MPS: Historic Bridges of Arkansas MPS
- NRHP reference No.: 10001151
- Added to NRHP: April 8, 2011

The North Jackson Street Bridge is a historic bridge in De Witt, Arkansas. Built c. 1910, it carries North Jackson Street over Holt Branch, just south of North Circle Drive. It consists of two spans of steel girders, resting on concrete abutments and a concrete central pier, with concrete decking. It is 32 feet (9.8 m) long and has a roadbed 22 feet (6.7 m) wide. Its guard rails consist of poured concrete panels, with incised rectangles on the side. The short spans of the bridge demonstrate the unfamiliarity with the use of concrete as a bridge-building material. North Jackson Street was originally laid out as the principal route out of De Witt heading north.

The bridge was listed on the National Register of Historic Places in 2011.

== See also ==
- North Washington Street Bridge
- Maxwell Street Bridge
- National Register of Historic Places listings in Arkansas County, Arkansas
- List of bridges on the National Register of Historic Places in Arkansas
