= Russellville station =

- Missouri Pacific Depot, Russellville
- U.S. National Register of Historic Places
- U.S. Historic district – Contributing property
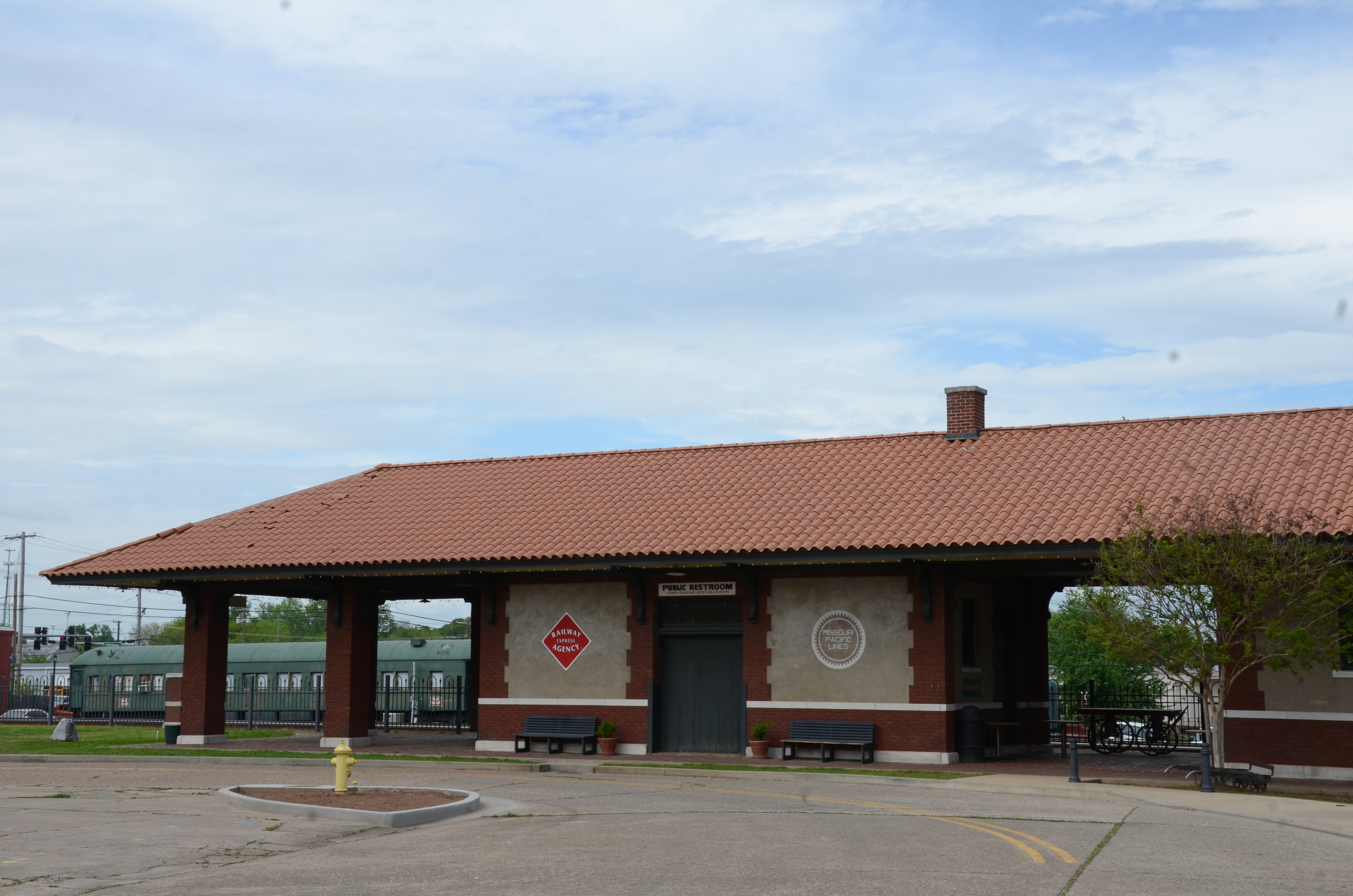

- Location within Arkansas Location within the United States
- Location: N of jct. of C St. and Denver Ave., Russellville, Arkansas
- Coordinates: 35°16′49″N 93°8′7″W
- Area: less than one acre
- Built: 1910
- Built by: Missouri Pacific Railroad
- Architectural style: Late 19th And 20th Century Revivals, Mediterranean
- Part of: Russellville Downtown Historic District (ID96000941)
- MPS: Historic Railroad Depots of Arkansas MPS
- NRHP reference No.: 92000620

Significant dates
- Added to NRHP: June 11, 1992
- Designated CP: September 3, 1996

The Russellville, Arkansas Missouri Pacific Depot is a historic passenger railroad station located just north of the intersection of South Denver Avenue and West C Street. It is a long rectangular single-story masonry building, finished in brick and stucco and covered by a hip roof with supporting Italianate brackets, designed in a Mediterranean style that was popular when it was built. At both ends, the roof extends beyond the structure to form a sheltered porch supported by square brick columns. A telegrapher's booth projects from the building's north (track-facing) side. An open breezeway separates the passenger and express freight sections of the depot. Three brick chimneys rise through the ridge line, two above the passenger section to the east and one above the freight section to the west. Completed in February 1917, it is typical of many railroad depots of that period; its original tile roof has been replaced by composition shingles.

Mandated by legislation passed in 1915 by the Arkansas General Assembly, depot construction was delayed by local disputes. It was completed by Iron Mountain Railway in early 1917 just a few months before Iron Mountain was acquired by the Missouri Pacific Railroad.

In 1916, the existing railroad freight house was moved and rebuilt two blocks east to make way for the new depot. Located between present-day North Commerce Avenue and North Arkansas Avenue, it was demolished in the 1970s.

The depot was listed on the National Register of Historic Places in 1992.

In 1999, the depot was acquired by the city of Russellville.

The statue placed in front of the depot, titled Mr. Conductor, has become a symbol of the downtown market that has developed in recent years. The statue is posed with a pocket watch in hand, calling any last passengers to alight. The watch shows the passing of time and would have told many travellers their next destination. Mr. Conductor has become a local personality, often photographed, decorated, and honoured.

== See also ==
- National Register of Historic Places listings in Pope County, Arkansas

Preceding station	Missouri Pacific Railroad	Following station
Olean toward Bagnell	Jefferson City - Bagnell	Jefferson City Terminus
