= Stebbins and Roberts Office Building and Factory =

- U.S. National Register of Historic Places
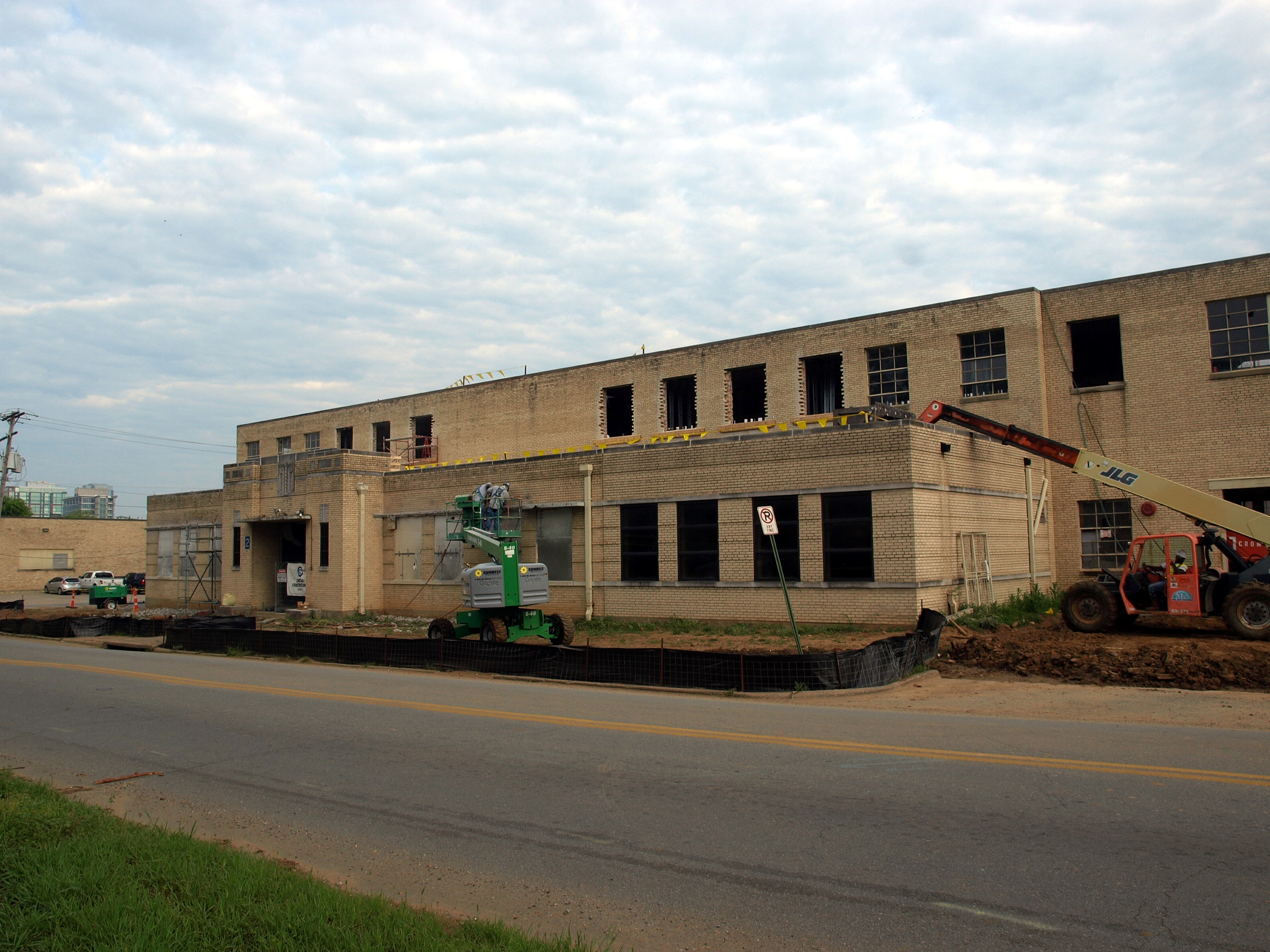
- The building in April 2017

- Location within Arkansas Location within the United States
- Location: 1300 E. 6th St., Little Rock, Arkansas
- Coordinates: 34°44′31″N 92°15′21″W
- Area: 1.07 acres (0.43 ha)
- Built: 1947
- Architect: Burks & Anderson
- NRHP reference No.: 16000682
- Added to NRHP: October 4, 2016

The Stebbins and Roberts Office Building and Factory is a historic manufacturing facility at 1300 East 6th Street in Little Rock, Arkansas. Set on 3 acres (1.2 ha) at the junction of East 6th and Shall Avenue, the building has a single-story office section and a two-story manufacturing facility behind. It has a buff brick exterior, and its main entrance has Art Deco decorative elements. The plant was built in 1947 to a design by Burks & Anderson, a prominent local architectural firm. It is their only known surviving industrial design.

The property was listed on the National Register of Historic Places in 2016.

== See also ==
- National Register of Historic Places listings in Little Rock, Arkansas
