= Russellville Downtown Historic District =

Historic district in Arkansas, United States

- U.S. National Register of Historic Places
- U.S. Historic district
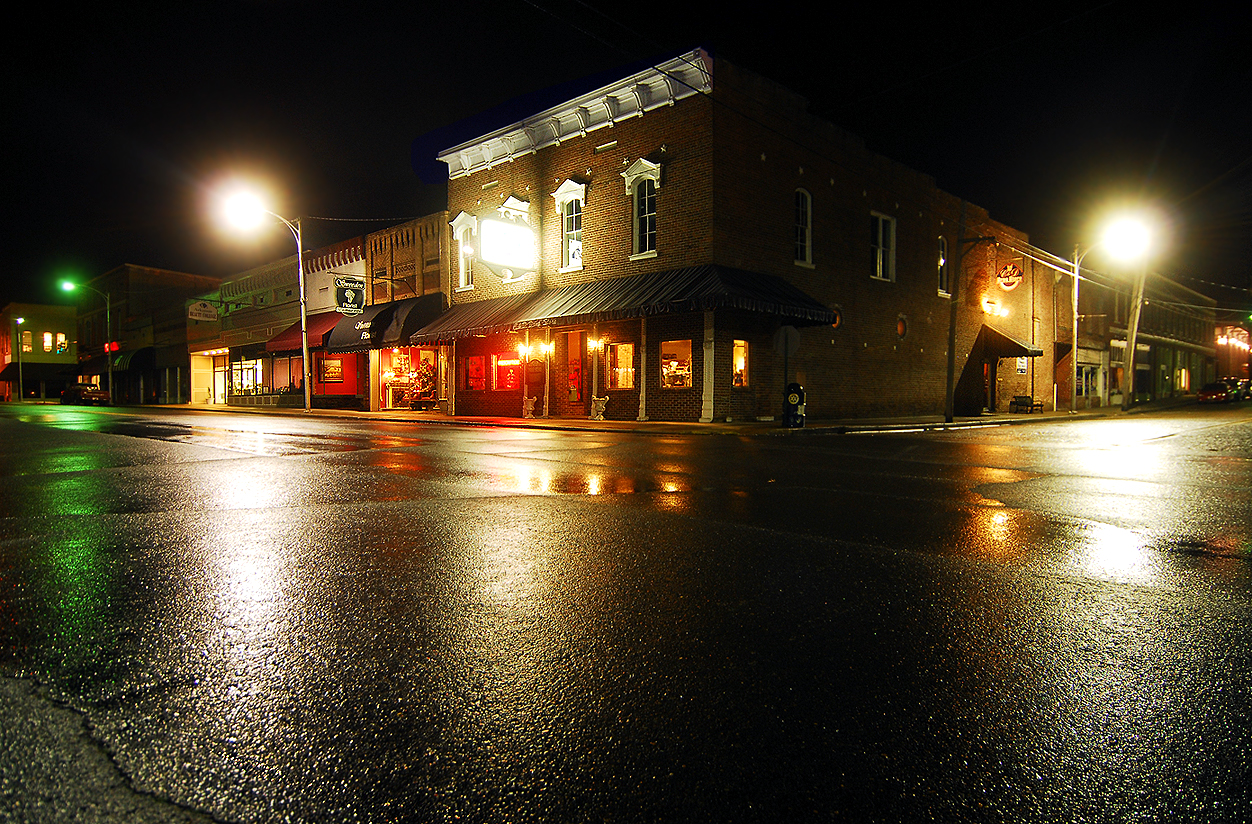

- Location within Arkansas Location within the United States
- Location: Roughly bounded by W. 2nd St., Arkansas Ave., Missouri--Pacific RR tracks and El Paso St., Russellville, Arkansas
- Coordinates: 35°16′44″N 93°8′6″W
- Area: 19 acres (7.7 ha)
- Built: 1875–1936
- Architect: H. Ray Burks
- Architectural style: Early Commercial
- NRHP reference No.: 96000941
- Added to NRHP: September 3, 1996

The Russellville Downtown Historic District encompasses an eight-block area of downtown Russellville, Arkansas. This area, developed primarily between 1875 and 1930, includes the city's highest concentration of period commercial architecture, a total of 34 buildings. Most of them are brick, one or two stories in height, and in a variety of styles. The district is roughly bounded by Arkansas and West 2nd Streets, El Paso Avenue, and the Missouri-Pacific Railroad tracks.

The district was listed on the National Register of Historic Places in 1996.

It includes:

- Pope County Courthouse (1931), 100 West Main Street, the "dominant" building in the district, a four-story brick building designed by architect H. Ray Burks in Art Deco style
- Riggs-Hamilton American Legion Post No. 20 (1936), built by Works Progress Administration, separately listed on the National Register
- railroad depot, separately listed on the National Register

== See also ==
- National Register of Historic Places listings in Pope County, Arkansas
