= DeWitt Commercial Historic District =

Historic district in Arkansas, United States

- U.S. National Register of Historic Places
- U.S. Historic district
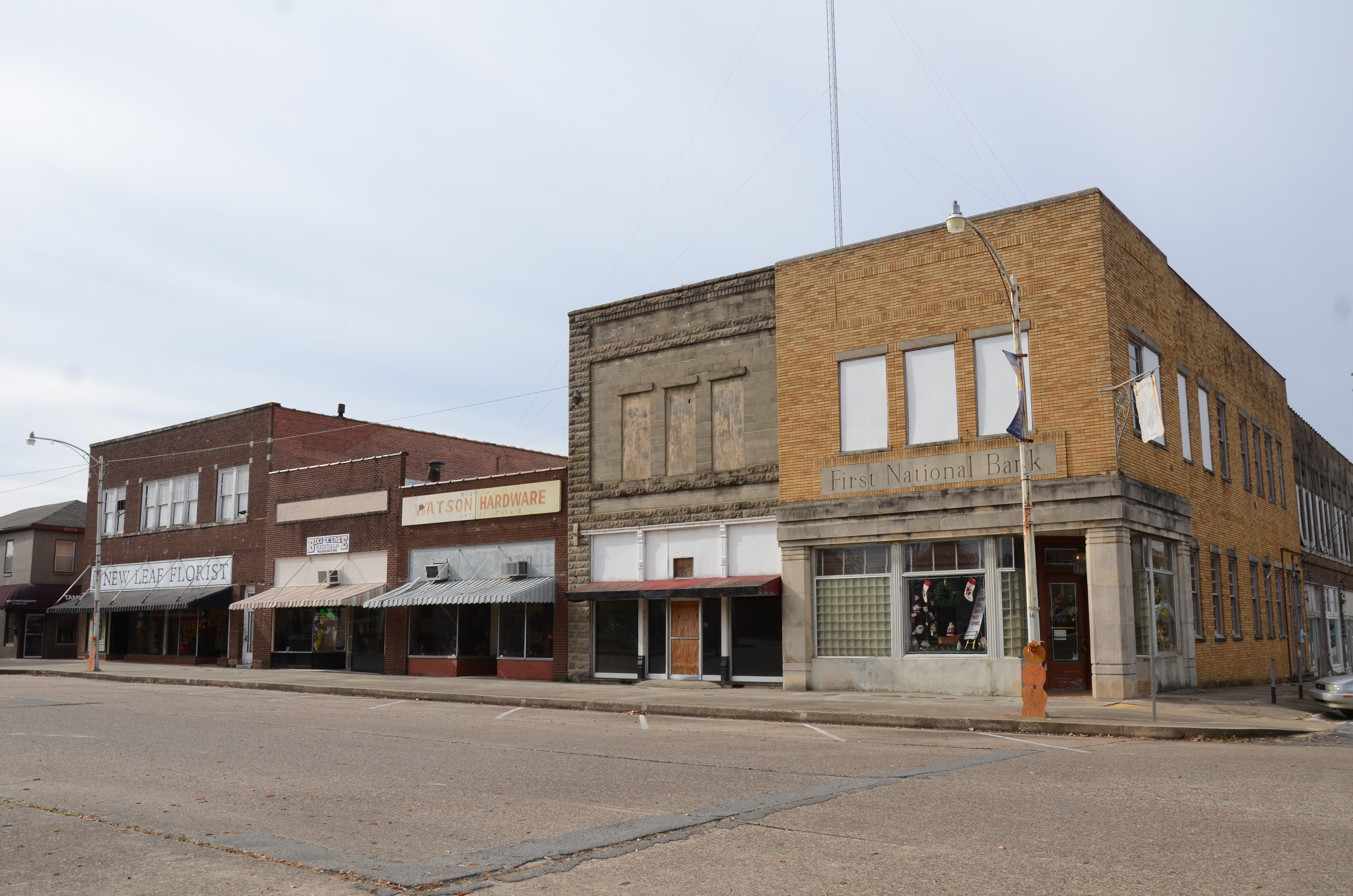

- Location within Arkansas Location within the United States
- Location: Roughly bounded by N. Washington, 2nd St., S. Adams and Gibson Ave., DeWitt, Arkansas
- Area: 13.2 acres (5.3 ha)
- Architect: Multiple, including H. Ray Burks (courthouse), Louis A. Simon (post office)
- Architectural style: Late Victorian, Late 19th And 20th Century Revivals, Modern Movement
- NRHP reference No.: 10000213
- Added to NRHP: April 27, 2010

The DeWitt Commercial Historic District encompasses part of the historic downtown of De Witt, Arkansas, the seat of the southern district of Arkansas County. It consists of roughly six square blocks, focused on Courthouse Square, location of the Southern District Courthouse. This area was platted out when De Witt was established as the new county seat of Arkansas County in 1854, replacing the Arkansas Post, which was not centrally located within the county after numerous other counties had been carved out of its territory. The city's growth remained modest until the arrival of the railroad in the 1890s, and saw most of its civic growth between then and the 1920s. The district includes 54 historically significant buildings, 32 of which face Courthouse Square. The oldest buildings in the district lie just north of Courthouse Square, either facing the square or in North Main or Gibson Streets.

The district was listed on the National Register of Historic Places in 2010.

== See also ==
- National Register of Historic Places listings in Arkansas County, Arkansas
