= De Witt Municipal Airport =

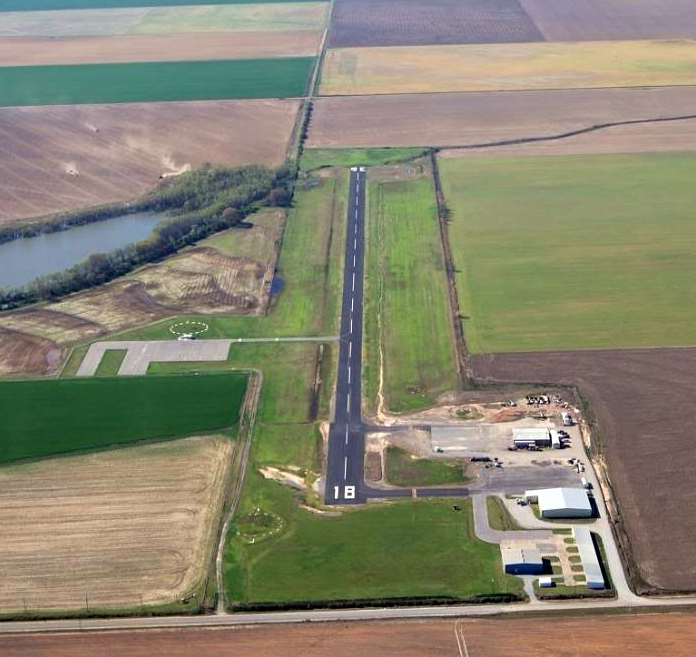
- IATA: none; ICAO: none; FAA LID: 5M1

Summary
- Airport type: Public
- Owner: City of De Witt
- Serves: De Witt, Arkansas
- Elevation AMSL: 190 ft (58 m)
- Coordinates: 34°15′44″N 091°18′27″W

Map
- Location of airport in Arkansas 5M1 (the United States)

Runways
| Direction | Length | | Surface |
| Direction | ft | m | Surface |
|---|---|---|---|
| 18/36 | 3,204 | 977 | Asphalt |

Statistics (2016)
- Aircraft operations: 51,100
- Based aircraft: 18
- Source: Federal Aviation Administration

De Witt Municipal Airport (FAA LID: 5M1) is a public use airport in Arkansas County, Arkansas, United States. It is owned by the City of De Witt (or DeWitt) and located three nautical miles (6 km) southeast of its central business district. This airport is included in the National Plan of Integrated Airport Systems for 2011–2015, which categorized it as a general aviation facility.

== Facilities and aircraft ==
De Witt Municipal Airport covers an area of 79 acres (32 ha) at an elevation of 190 feet (58 m) above mean sea level. It has one runway designated 18/36 with an asphalt surface measuring 3,204 by 60 feet (977 x 18 m).

For the 12-month period ending August 31, 2016, the airport had 51,100 aircraft operations, an average of 140 per day: 99.8% general aviation and 0.2% military. At that time there were 18 single-engine aircraft based at this airport.

== See also ==
- List of airports in Arkansas
