= North Washington Street Bridge (DeWitt) =

- U.S. National Register of Historic Places
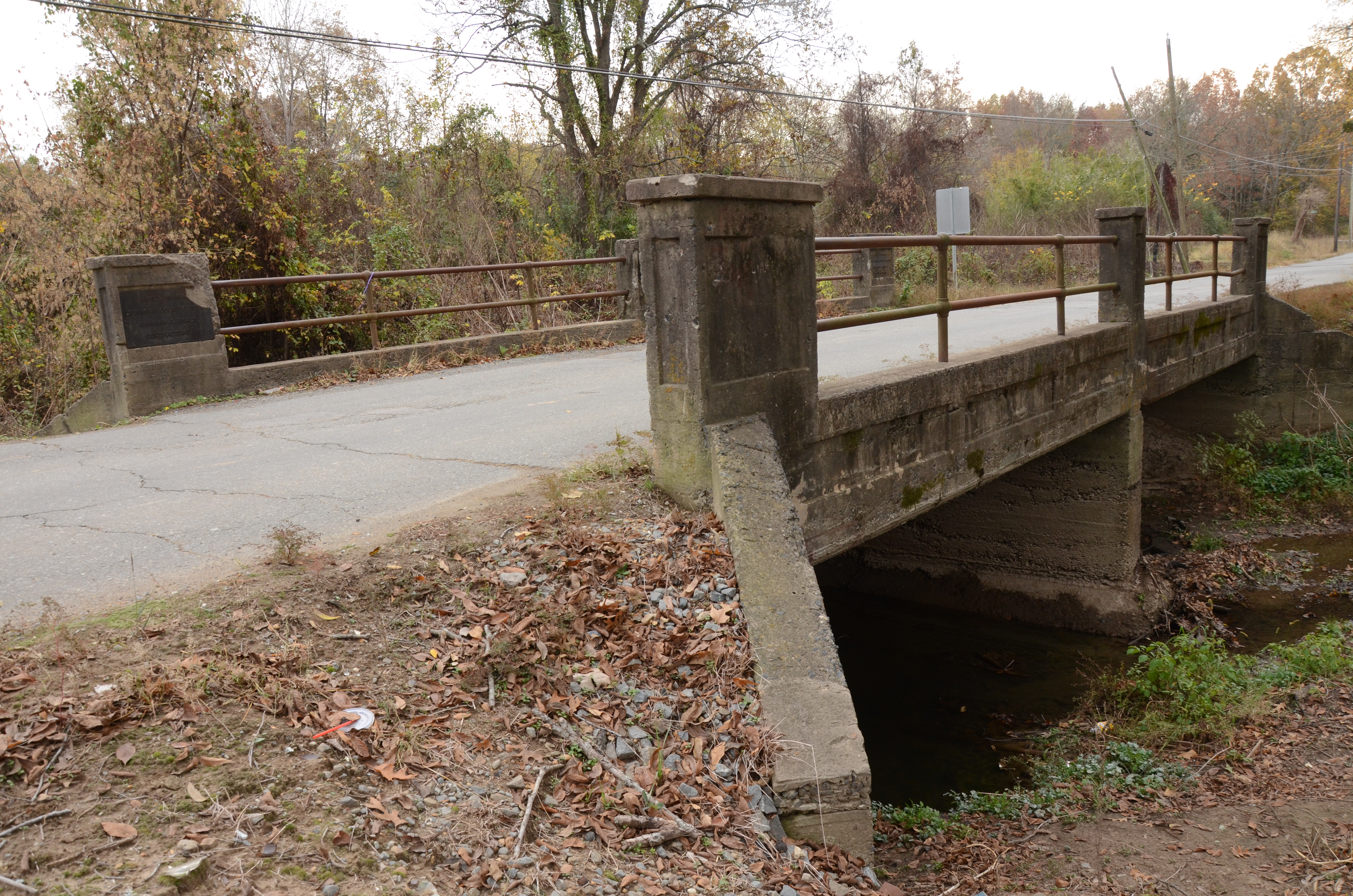

- Location within Arkansas Location within the United States
- Nearest city: DeWitt, Arkansas
- Coordinates: 34°18′02″N 91°20′0″W
- Area: less than one acre
- Built: 1942
- MPS: Historic Bridges of Arkansas MPS
- NRHP reference No.: 13001102
- Added to NRHP: January 22, 2014

The North Washington Street Bridge is a historic bridge in DeWitt, Arkansas, USA. Built in 1910, it carries North Washington Street over Holt Branch, just south of Holt Lane, and is the oldest known concrete bridge span in the state. It consists of two spans of steel girders, resting on concrete abutments and a concrete central pier, with concrete decking. It is 40 feet (12 m) long and has a roadbed 15 feet (4.6 m) wide. Its guard rails consist of metal piping mounted on concrete piers with simple recessed panels as a decorative effect. The short spans of the bridge demonstrate the unfamiliarity with the use of concrete as a bridge-building material.

The bridge was listed on the National Register of Historic Places in 2014.

== See also ==
- North Jackson Street Bridge
- Maxwell Street Bridge
- National Register of Historic Places listings in Arkansas County, Arkansas
- List of bridges on the National Register of Historic Places in Arkansas
