= DeWitt, Arkansas =

City in Arkansas

- City
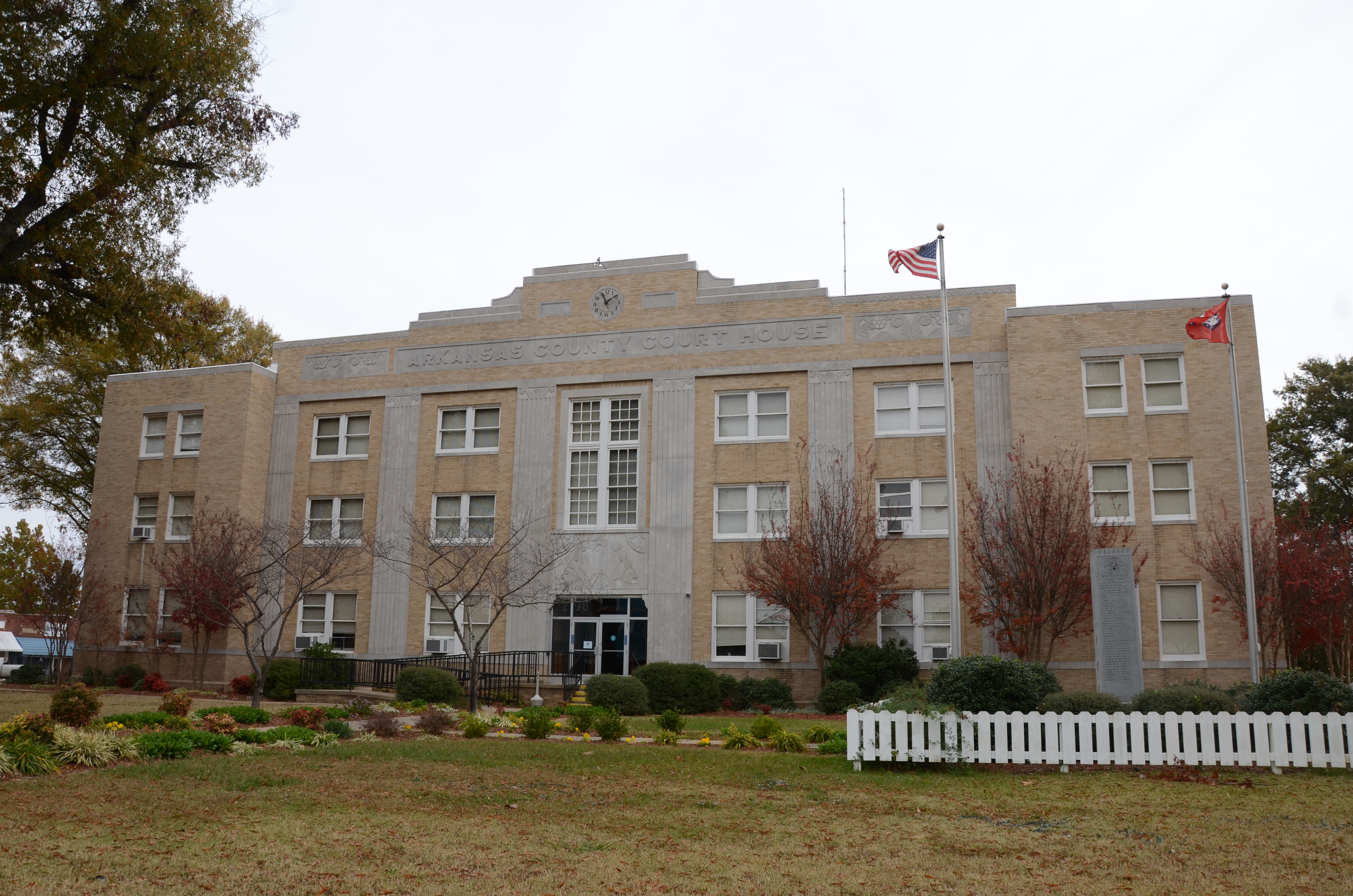
- Arkansas County Courthouse, Southern District in the DeWitt Commercial Historic District

- Location of DeWitt in Arkansas County, Arkansas.
- Coordinates: 34°17′15″N 91°20′18″W
- Country: United States
- State: Arkansas
- County: Arkansas
- Incorporated: January 26, 1876

Government
  - Type: Mayor–council

Area
  - Total: 2.99 sq mi (7.75 km^{2})
  - Land: 2.99 sq mi (7.75 km^{2})
  - Water: 0 sq mi (0.00 km^{2})
- Elevation: 167 ft (51 m)

Population (2020)
  - Total: 3,056
  - Estimate (2025): 2,791 ▼
  - Density: 1,021.3/sq mi (394.32/km^{2})
- Time zone: UTC-6 (Central (CST))
  - Summer (DST): UTC-5 (CDT)
- ZIP code: 72042
- Area code: 870
- FIPS code: 05-18790
- GNIS feature ID: 2404205
- Website: dewittar.weebly.com

DeWitt is the second largest city in Arkansas County, Arkansas, United States, which also serves as the county seat of the southern district of Arkansas County. Population was 3,056 at the time of the 2020 census. The city is located on the Arkansas Grand Prairie, known for rice farming and duck hunting. DeWitt is home to the DeWitt School District and the DeWitt Municipal Airport.

== History ==
The Arkansas County Quorum Court determined Arkansas Post, which had served as county seat since 1813, was no longer centrally located within the county following creation of several Southeast Arkansas counties. A new, more centrally located town was proposed to become county seat. Founded February 19, 1853, the name DeWitt was picked out of a hat after being submitted by an admirer of the sixth governor of New York, DeWitt Clinton, one of many localities named for Clinton during the period. The town was platted in 1854, and has had a post office since 1856. The city was incorporated in 1875.

== Geography ==
DeWitt and Arkansas County are located in the Arkansas Delta (in Arkansas, usually referred to as "the Delta") a subregion of the Mississippi Alluvial Plain, which is a flat area consisting of rich, fertile sediment deposits from the Mississippi River between Louisiana and Illinois.

Within the Delta, Arkansas County is almost entirely within the Grand Prairie subregion, historically a flat grassland plain underlain by an impermeable clay layer (the Stuttgart soil series). Prior to the 19th century, flatter areas with slowly to very slowly permeable soils (often containing fragipans) supported Arkansas's largest prairie, covered in prairie grasses and forbs, with oaks covering the low hills and ridges, and pockets of floodplains with bottomland hardwood forests. This region was a sharp contrast to the bottomland forests that once dominated other parts of the Mississippi Alluvial Plain. Cropland has now largely replaced the native vegetation. Distinctively, rice is the main crop; soybeans, cotton, corn, and wheat are also grown. The rice fields provide habitat and forage for large numbers and many species of waterfowl; duck and goose hunting occurs at this important spot along the Mississippi Flyway.

According to the United States Census Bureau, the city has a total area of 2.6 square miles (6.7 km^{2}), all land.

== Demographics ==
Historical population
Census	Pop.	Note	%±
1880	169		—
1890	246		45.6%
1900	318		29.3%
1910	831		161.3%
1940	2,498		—
1950	2,843		13.8%
1960	3,019		6.2%
1970	3,728		23.5%
1980	3,928		5.4%
1990	3,553		−9.5%
2000	3,552		0.0%
2010	3,292		−7.3%
2020	3,056		−7.2%
2025 (est.)	2,791	▼	−8.7%
U.S. Decennial Census; 2014 Estimate

=== 2020 census ===
DeWitt racial composition
Race	Number	Percentage
White (non-Hispanic)	2,153	70.45%
Black or African American (non-Hispanic)	619	20.26%
Native American	4	0.13%
Asian	20	0.65%
Pacific Islander	1	0.03%
Other/Mixed	144	4.71%
Hispanic or Latino	115	3.76%

As of the 2020 census, DeWitt had a population of 3,056. The median age was 42.0 years. 22.5% of residents were under the age of 18 and 19.7% were 65 years of age or older. For every 100 females, there were 90.0 males, and for every 100 females age 18 and over, there were 86.1 males age 18 and over.

0.0% of residents lived in urban areas, while 100.0% lived in rural areas.

There were 1,231 households in DeWitt, of which 30.4% had children under the age of 18 living in them. Of all households, 37.1% were married-couple households, 20.0% were households with a male householder and no spouse or partner present, and 36.7% were households with a female householder and no spouse or partner present. About 35.1% of all households were made up of individuals, and 16.7% had someone living alone who was 65 years of age or older. There were 730 families.

There were 1,452 housing units, of which 15.2% were vacant. The homeowner vacancy rate was 3.1% and the rental vacancy rate was 7.9%.

=== 2010 census ===
As of the 2010 United States census, there were 3,292 people living in the city. 74.5% were White, 21.4% African American, 0.3% Native American, 0.4% Asian, 2.1% from some other race and 1.4% from two or more races. 3.2% were Hispanic or Latino of any race.

=== 2000 census ===
As of the census of 2000, there were 3,552 people, 1,419 households, and 977 families living in the city. The population density was 1,371.7 inhabitants per square mile (529.6/km^{2}). There were 1,552 housing units at an average density of 599.4 per square mile (231.4/km^{2}). The racial makeup of the city was 77.93% White, 20.92% Black or African American, 0.17% Native American, 0.23% Asian, 0.20% from other races, and 0.56% from two or more races. 0.53% of the population were Hispanic or Latino of any race.

There were 1,419 households, out of which 32.2% had children under the age of 18 living with them, 47.2% were married couples living together, 18.3% had a female householder with no husband present, and 31.1% were non-families. 27.1% of all households were made up of individuals, and 14.4% had someone living alone who was 65 years of age or older. The average household size was 2.35 and the average family size was 2.84.

In the city, the population was spread out, with 24.5% under the age of 18, 8.3% from 18 to 24, 26.0% from 25 to 44, 22.1% from 45 to 64, and 19.0% who were 65 years of age or older. The median age was 39 years. For every 100 females, there were 87.1 males. For every 100 females age 18 and over, there were 79.1 males.

The median income for a household in the city was $30,921, and the median income for a family was $42,917. Males had a median income of $30,536 versus $25,240 for females. The per capita income for the city was $18,993. About 10.6% of families and 18.2% of the population were below the poverty line, including 25.0% of those under age 18 and 14.4% of those age 65 or over.

== Education ==
DeWitt is the center of the DeWitt School District and is home to DeWitt High School, DeWitt Middle School, DeWitt Elementary School, and Gillett Elementary School. Their mascot is the Dragons, and their school colors are blue and gold. DeWitt High School houses grades 9 through 12. DeWitt Middle School houses grades 6 through 8, and both DeWitt Elementary and Gillett Elementary provide kindergarten through 5th grade.

== Culture and contemporary life ==
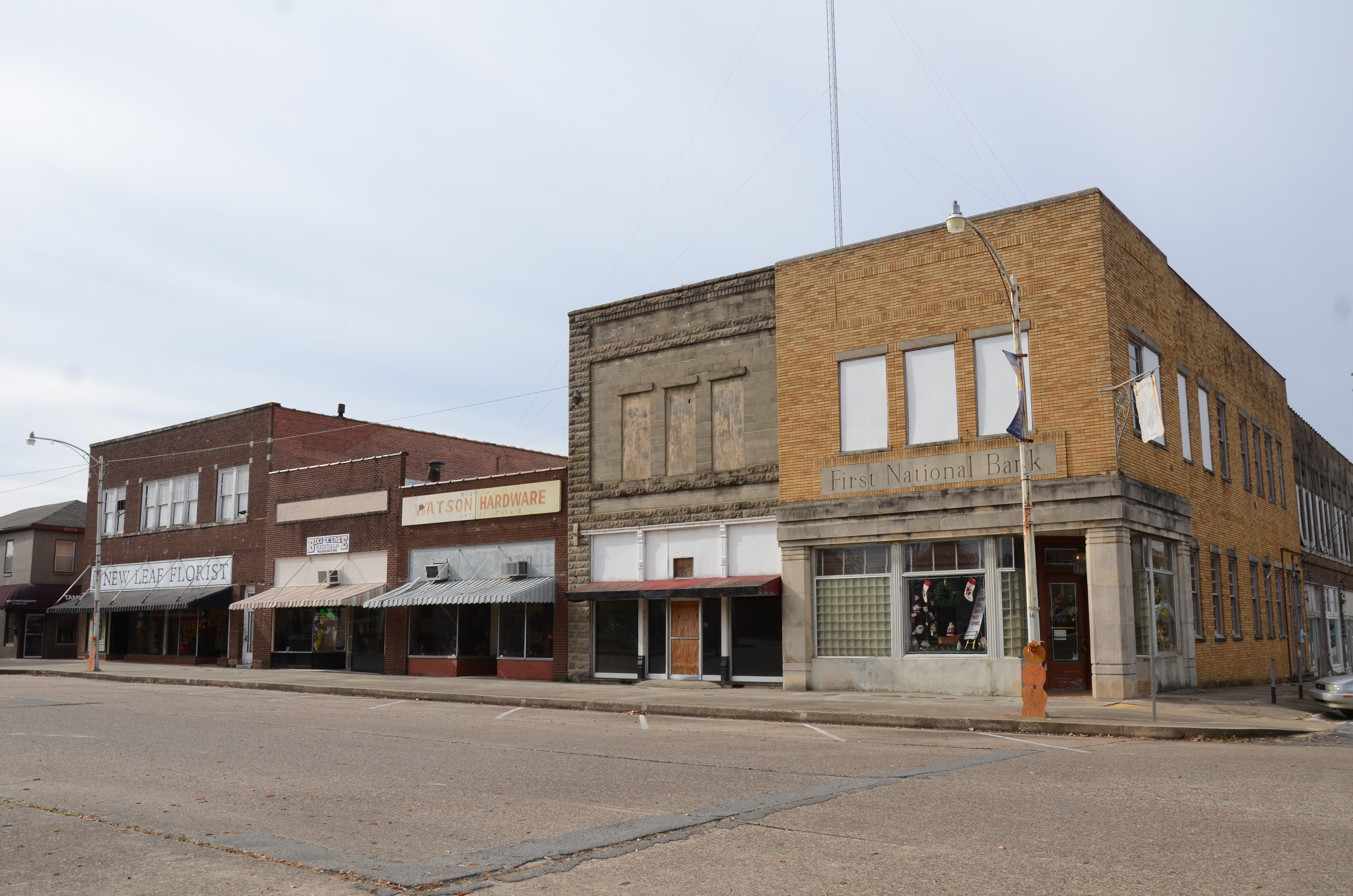
Streetside in the DeWitt Commercial Historic District

The city contains eight listings on the National Register of Historic Places. The DeWitt Commercial Historic District contains 54 historically significant buildings, 32 of which face Courthouse Square, including the Arkansas County Courthouse-Southern District itself. The L.A. Black Rice Milling Association Inc. Office and Halliburton House preserve historical associations with prominent local officials. The DeWitt Post Office contains New Deal-era murals. Three historic bridges are also listed in the city: Maxwell Street Bridge, North Jackson Street Bridge, and the North Washington Street Bridge.

In September 2011, the feature film Mud (2013; written and directed by Jeff Nichols, starring Reese Witherspoon and Matthew McConaughey) was filmed in and around Arkansas County. The movie featured a scene filmed at DeWitt Hospital & Nursing Home.

=== Annual cultural events ===
Perhaps the most popular annual event in DeWitt is duck hunting season between November and January, a tradition dating back to the Illinois Indians who traveled south to Arkansas to hunt, popular with Arkansans and tourist hunters from across the country.

The Arkansas County Fair has been held annually since 1938 at the Arkansas County Fairgrounds in DeWitt during mid-September.

=== Media ===
DeWitt has been served by the DeWitt Era Enterprise since 1929. Several other newspapers have been published in the city, many during the late 19th century.

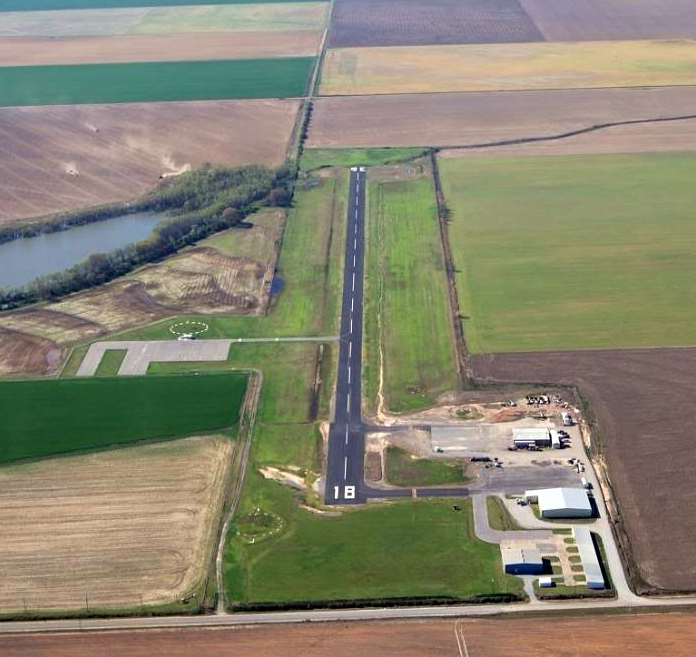
DeWitt Municipal Airport

== Infrastructure ==
The primary highway in DeWitt is U.S. Route 165 (US 165), which connects the city to Stuttgart (the county seat of Arkansas County's northern district) and Little Rock, Arkansas to the north and Dumas, Arkansas and Louisiana to the south. Highway 1 (AR 1) runs along the city's eastern side, with Highway 1 Business (AR 1B) passing through downtown DeWitt. Other minor highways include AR 152 (2nd Street) and AR 130. AR 980 gives access to the DeWitt Municipal Airport, a general aviation facility.

The Great River Road, a National Scenic Byway following the Mississippi River, passes through DeWitt. It enters the city from the south on US 165 and turns onto AR 1 toward St. Charles.

== Notable people ==
- Bobby Capps, keyboardist/vocalist for the southern rock band 38 Special
- George Dickey, catcher for the Boston Red Sox and Chicago White Sox
- Wayne DuMond, serial rapist and killer
- Carlene Mitchell, coach of WNBA basketball team Chicago Sky and of NCAA UC Santa Barbara Gauchos
- Carol Rasco, Director of the Domestic Policy Council under President Bill Clinton
- Frank Glasgow Tinker, combat flying ace with eight victories during Spanish Civil War
