= Lonoke County Courthouse =

Historic courhouse in Georgia, US

- U.S. National Register of Historic Places
- U.S. Historic district – Contributing property
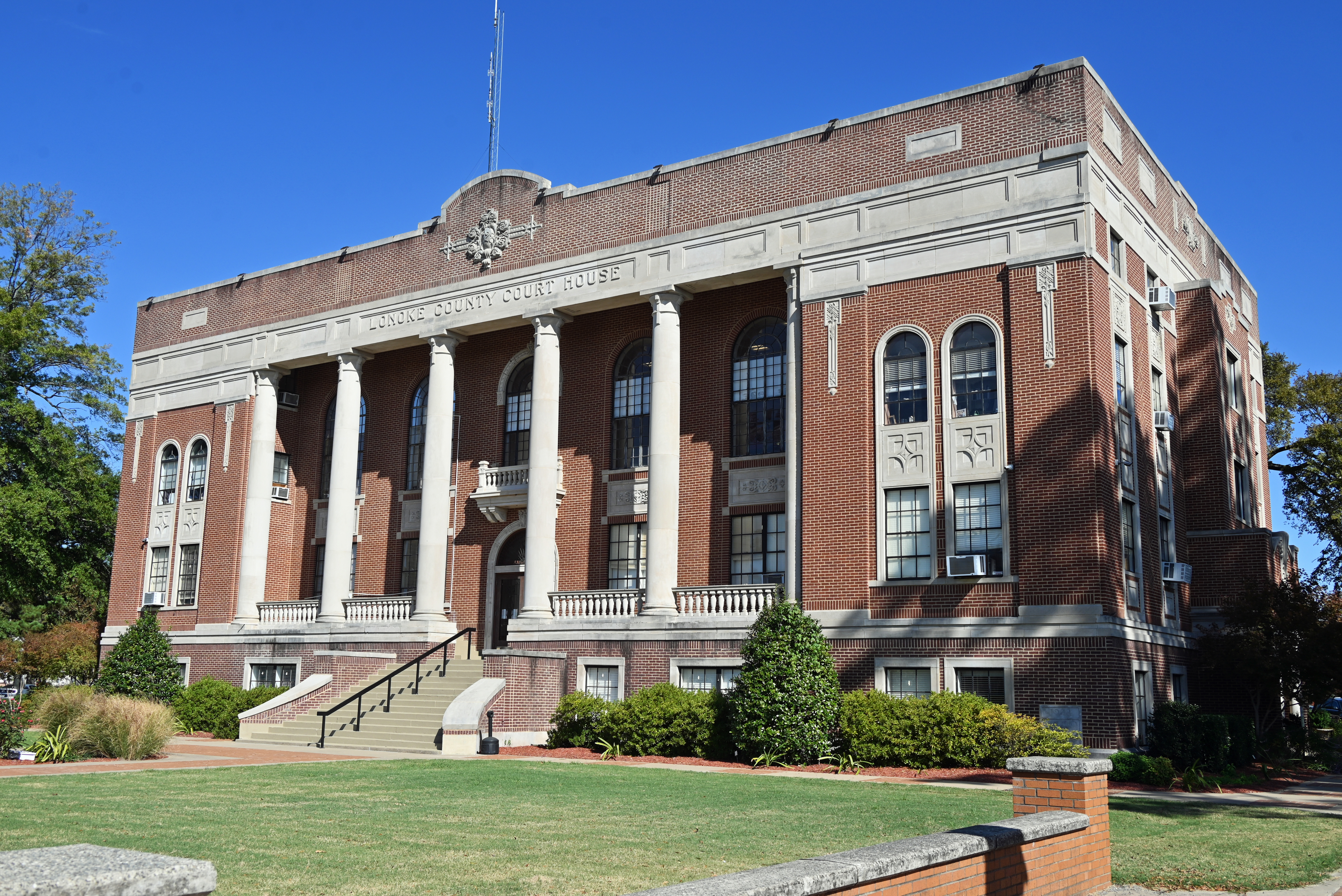

- Location within Arkansas Location within the United States
- Location: N. Center St., Lonoke, Arkansas
- Coordinates: 34°47′9″N 91°53′57″W
- Area: 3 acres (1.2 ha)
- Built: 1928
- Architect: H. Ray Burks
- Architectural style: Classical Revival
- Part of: Lonoke Downtown Historic District (ID96000528)
- NRHP reference No.: 82002121

Significant dates
- Added to NRHP: June 8, 1982
- Designated CP: May 10, 1996

The Lonoke County Courthouse is located at 301 North Center Street in downtown Lonoke, the county seat of Lonoke County, Arkansas. It is a four-story masonry structure, finished in red brick, with cast stone trim and a raised brick basement. The main facade has its entrance recessed behind an arcade of two-story Doric columns. It was built in 1928 to a design by Little Rock architect H. Ray Burks.

The building was listed on the National Register of Historic Places in 1982.

== See also ==
- National Register of Historic Places listings in Lonoke County, Arkansas
