= Drew County Courthouse =

- U.S. National Register of Historic Places
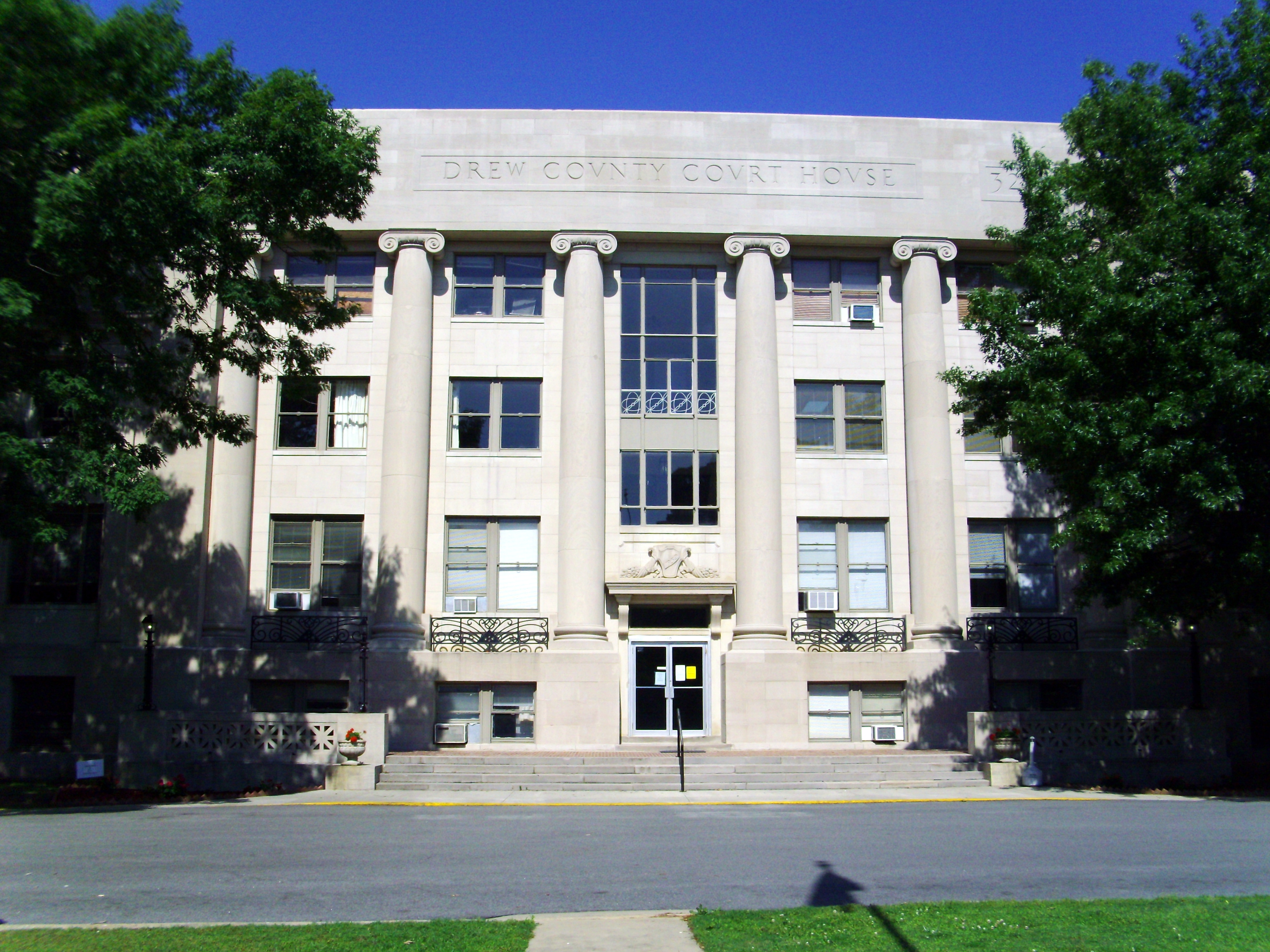

- Location within Arkansas Location within the United States
- Location: 210 S. Main St. Monticello, Arkansas
- Coordinates: 33°37′36″N 91°47′29″W
- Area: 2.5 acres (1.0 ha)
- Built: 1932
- Built by: Hewitt & Russell
- Architect: H. Ray Burks
- Architectural style: Art Deco, Classical Moderne
- NRHP reference No.: 97001226
- Added to NRHP: October 17, 1997

The Drew County Courthouse is located at 210 South Main Street in Monticello, Arkansas. The 3 1/2-story Classical Moderne building was designed by Arkansas architect H. Ray Burks and built in 1932. It is Drew County's fourth courthouse; the first two were wood-frame buildings dating to the 1850s, the third a brick structure built 1870–71. It is an L-shaped building, built of limestone blocks and topped by a flat tar roof. It consists of a central block, five bays wide, and symmetrical flanking wings a single bay in width. The central section has a portico of six Ionic columns, which rise the full three and one half stories, and are topped by a square pediment which reads "Drew County Courthouse" flanked by the date of construction.

The building was listed on the National Register of Historic Places in 1997.

== Gallery ==
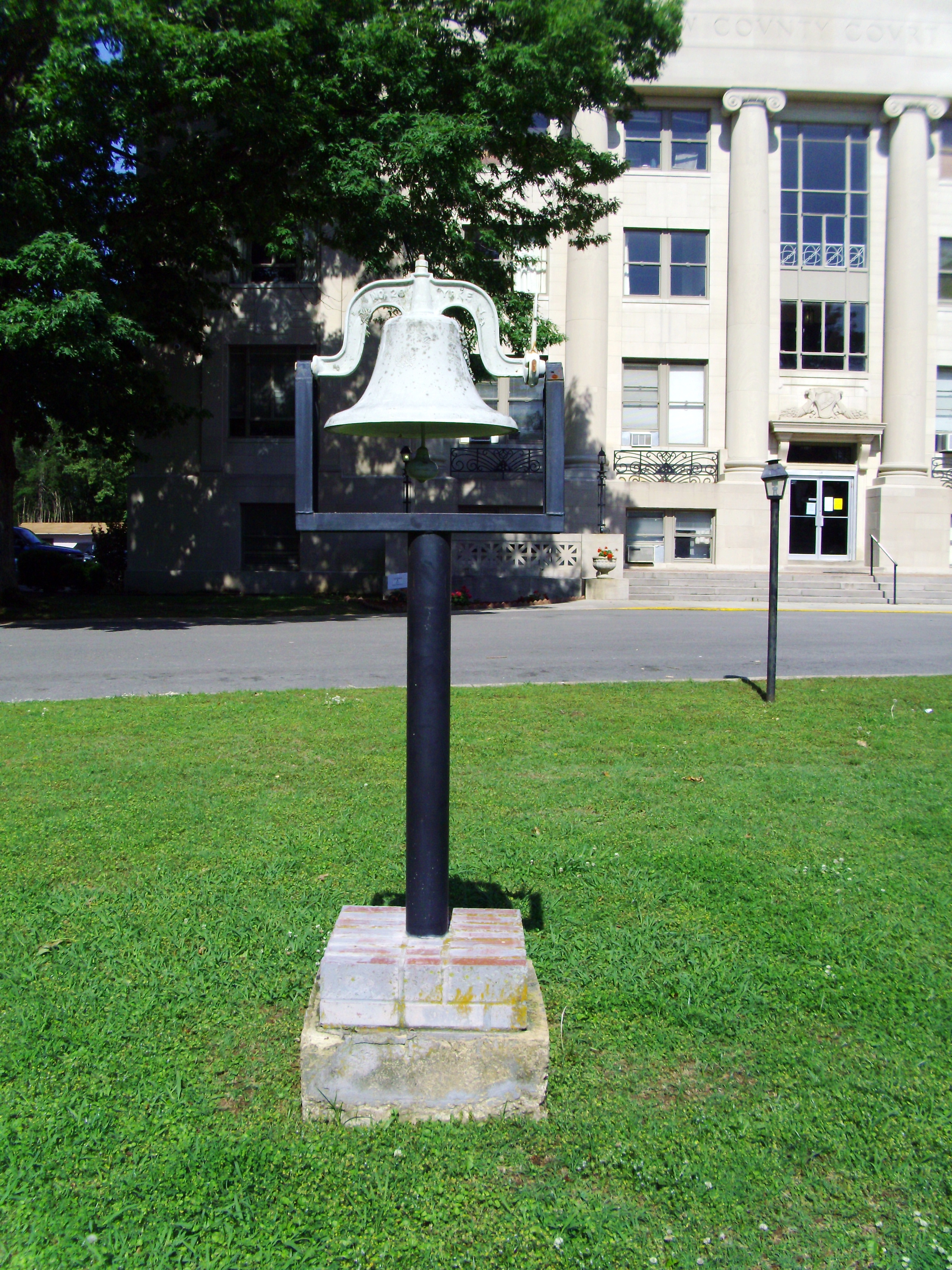
Bell on courthouse grounds

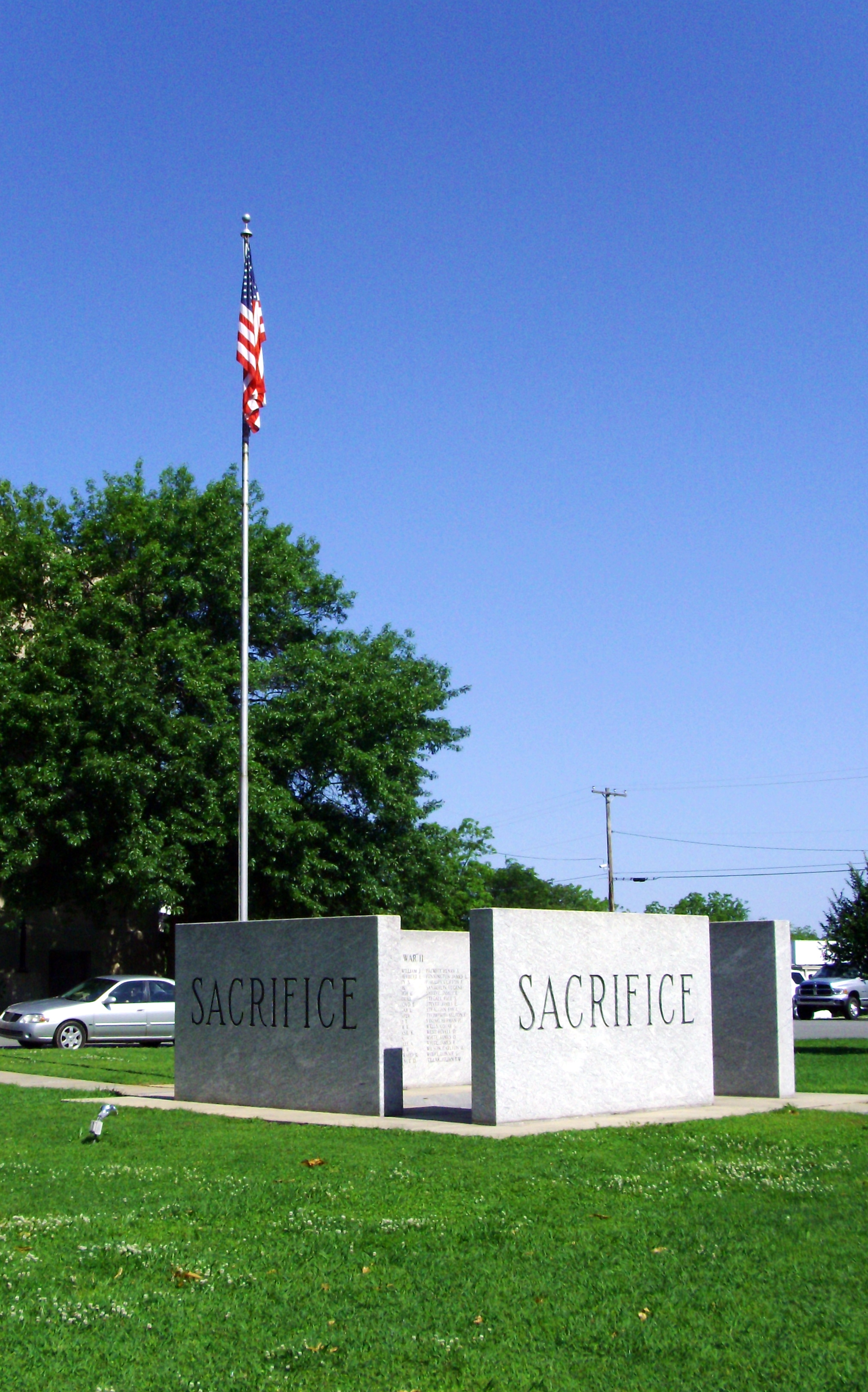
War memorial

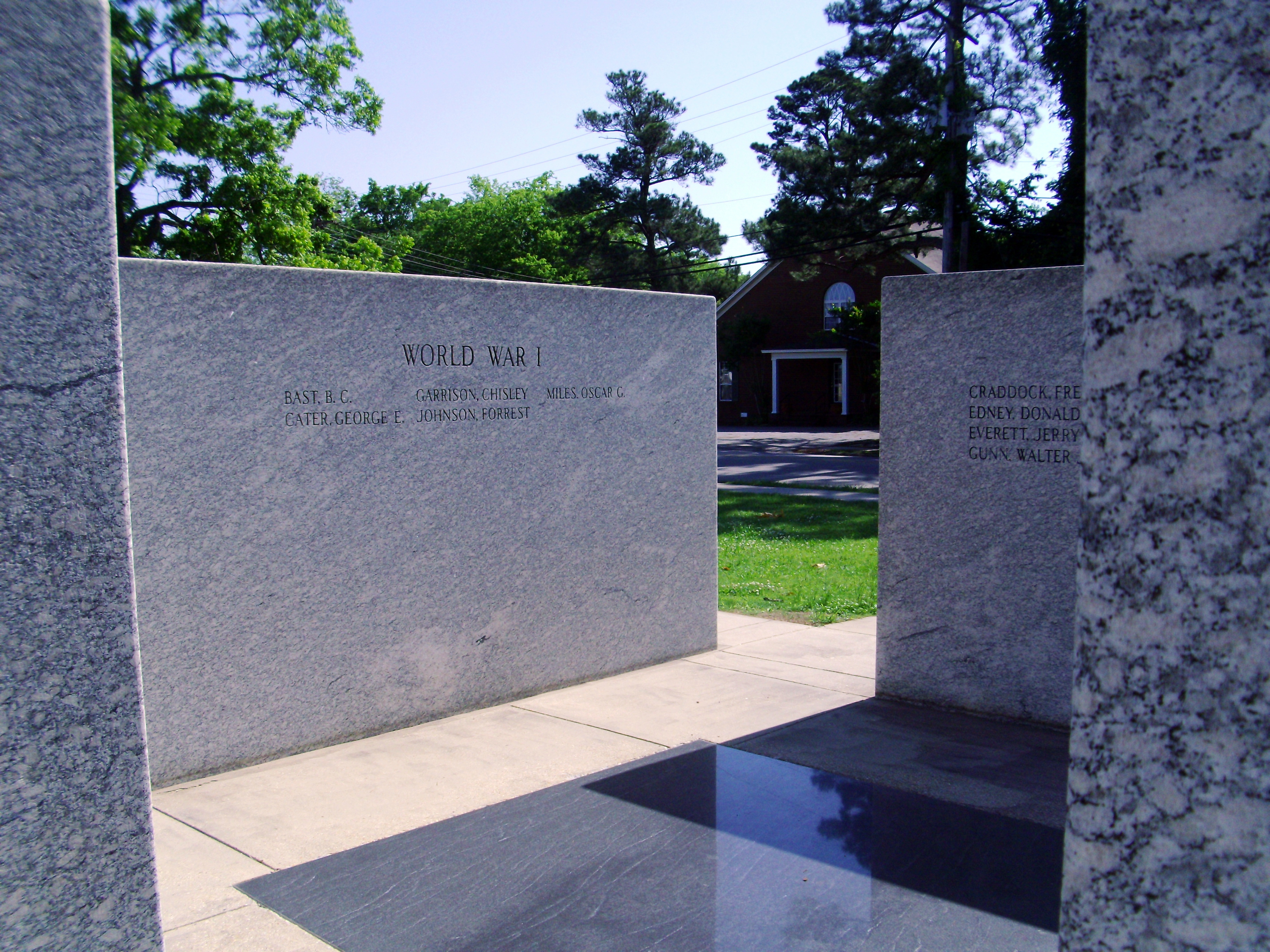
Memorial interior

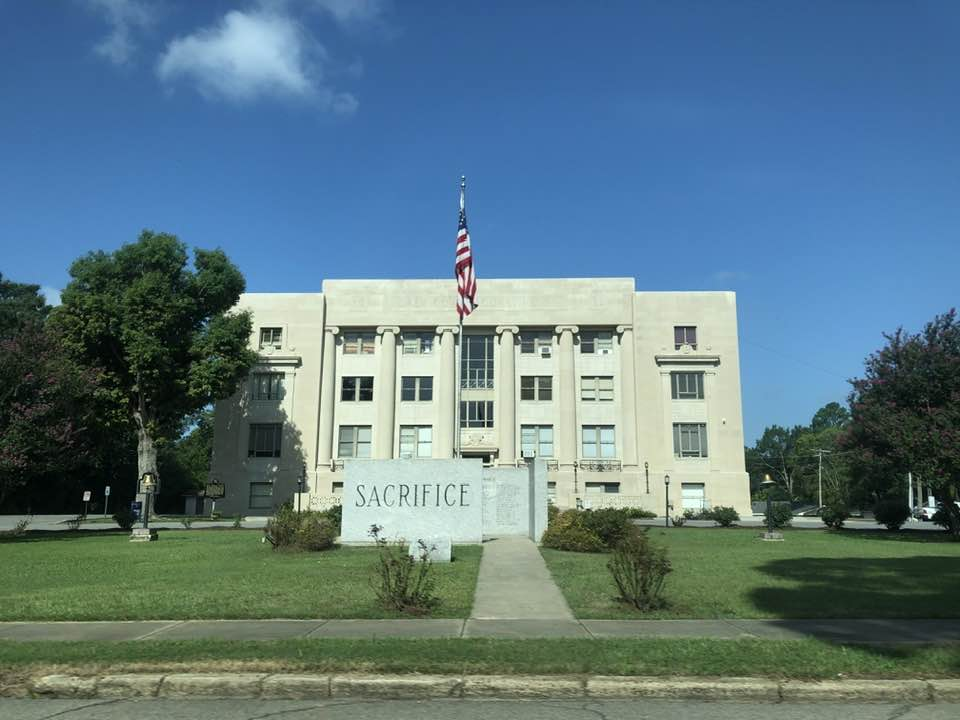
2021 photo of Drew County Arkansas Courthouse from S Main St

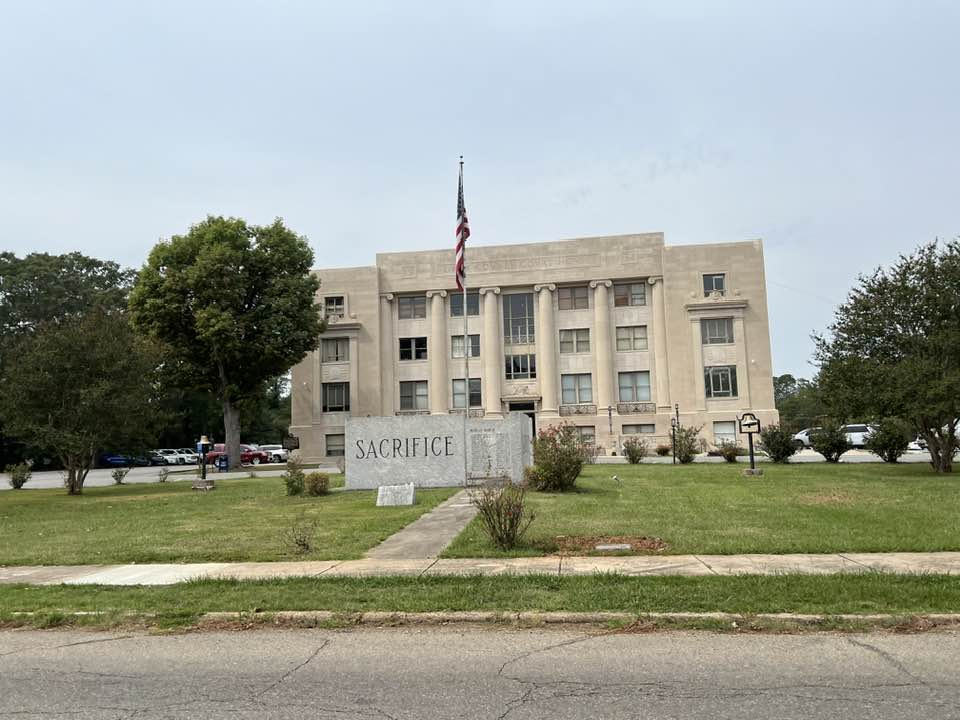
Drew County Arkansas Courthouse was taken on Friday, September 22, 2023 at 12:03 PM on S Main St in Monticello Arkansas

== See also ==
- National Register of Historic Places listings in Drew County, Arkansas
