= Ken Poole =

American football player (born 1958)

No. 78
- Position: Defensive end

Personal information
- Born: October 20, 1958 (age 68); Hermitage, Arkansas, U.S.
- Listed height: 6 ft 3 in (1.91 m)
- Listed weight: 251 lb (114 kg)

Career information
- High school: Hermitage
- College: Louisiana-Monroe
- NFL draft: 1981: 5th round, 126th overall pick

Career history
- Miami Dolphins (1981)

Career NFL statistics
- GP / GS: 16 / 0
- Stats at Pro Football Reference

Kenneth Dawayne Poole (born October 20, 1958) is an American former professional football player who was a defensive end for the Miami Dolphins of the National Football League (NFL). He played college football for the Louisiana–Monroe Warhawks. Poole was selected by the Dolphins in the fifth round (126th overall) of the 1981 NFL draft, and he played 16 games for the Dolphins in the 1981 season.

== See also ==
- List of Louisiana–Monroe Warhawks in the NFL draft
