= Tommy Tuberville =

American politician and football coach (born 1954)

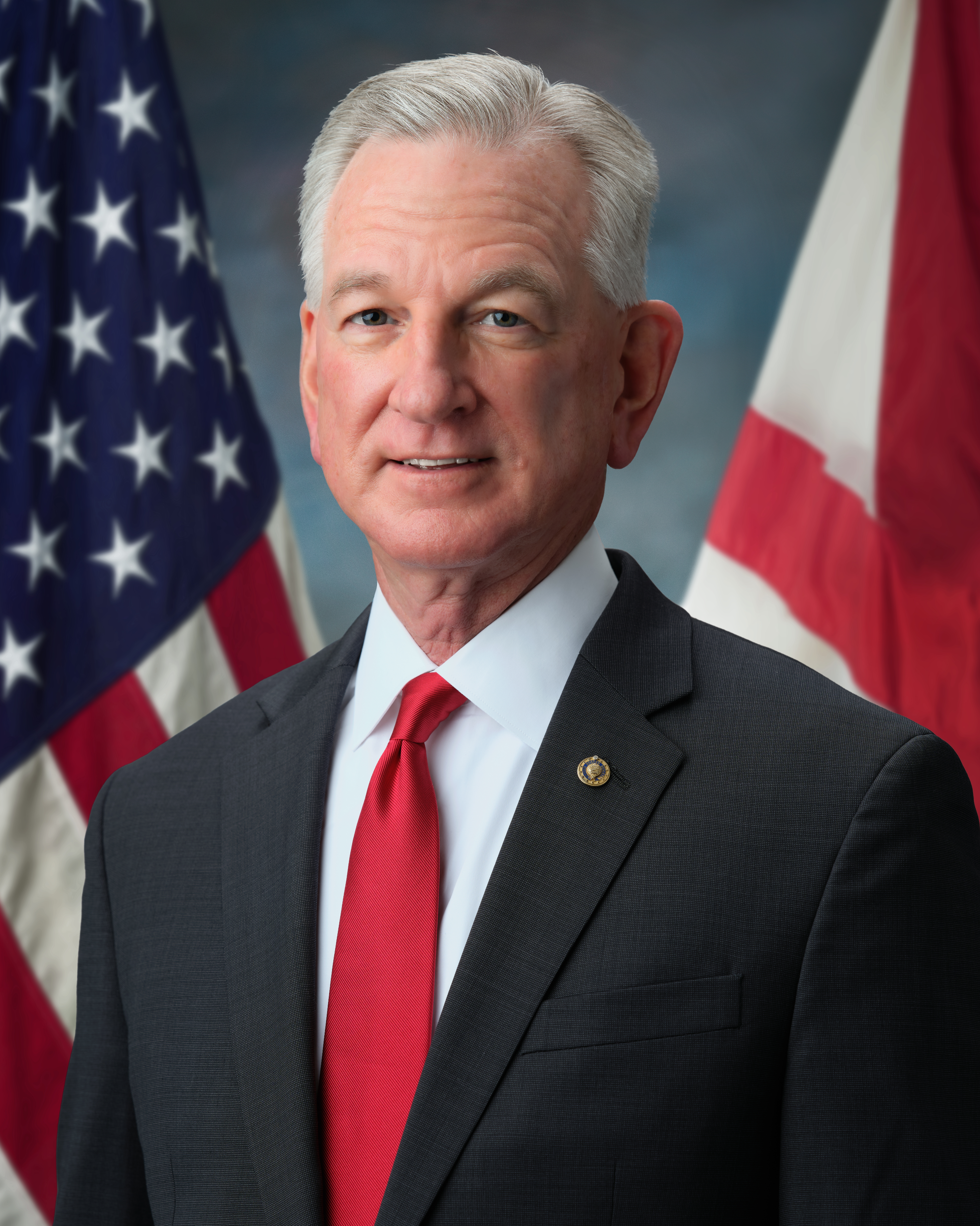
- Official portrait, 2023

Governor-elect of Alabama
- Assuming office January 16, 2027
- Lieutenant: John Wahl (elect)
- Succeeding: Kay Ivey

United States Senator from Alabama
- Incumbent
- Assumed office January 3, 2021 Serving with Katie Britt
- Preceded by: Doug Jones

Personal details
- Born: Thomas Hawley Tuberville; September 18, 1954 (age 72) Camden, Arkansas, U.S.
- Party: Republican
- Spouses: Vicki Harris (m. 1976; div. 1991); Suzanne Fette (m. 1991)
- Children: 2
- Education: Southern Arkansas University (BS)
- Website: Senate website Campaign website
- Coaching career

Playing career
- 1972–1975: Southern State
- Position: Safety

Coaching career (HC unless noted)
- 1976–1977: Hermitage HS (AR) (assistant)
- 1978–1979: Hermitage HS (AR)
- 1980–1984: Arkansas State (DB/NG/LB)
- 1986–1992: Miami (FL) (assistant)
- 1993: Miami (FL) (DC)
- 1994: Texas A&M (DC/LB)
- 1995–1998: Ole Miss
- 1999–2008: Auburn
- 2010–2012: Texas Tech
- 2013–2016: Cincinnati

Head coaching record
- Overall: 159–99 (college); 9–10 (high school)
- Bowls: 7–6

Accomplishments and honors

Championships
- National (2004); SEC (2004); AAC (2014); 5 SEC West Division (2000–2002, 2004–2005)

Awards
- AP Coach of the Year (2004); AFCA Coach of the Year (2004); Paul "Bear" Bryant Award (2004); Sporting News College Football COY (2004); Walter Camp Coach of the Year (2004); 2× SEC Coach of the Year (1997, 2004)
- Tuberville's voice Tuberville honoring KIA Alabama military servicemembers for Memorial Day. Recorded May 17, 2023

Thomas Hawley Tuberville (/ˈtʌbərvɪl/; TUB-ər-vil; born September 18, 1954) is an American politician and retired college football coach and sports broadcaster who is the governor-elect of Alabama. Since 2021, he has served as the senior United States senator from Alabama. Tuberville is a member of the Republican Party. Before entering politics, Tuberville was the head football coach at Auburn University from 1999 to 2008. He was also the head football coach at the University of Mississippi from 1995 to 1998, Texas Tech University from 2010 to 2012, and the University of Cincinnati from 2013 to 2016.

Tuberville won five national coach-of-the-year awards (AP, AFCA, Sporting News, Walter Camp, and Bear Bryant) after Auburn's 13–0 season in 2004, in which Auburn won the Southeastern Conference title and the Sugar Bowl, but was left out of the BCS National Championship Game. (Note: In 2025, Auburn retroactively claimed the national championship for the 2004 season.) He earned his 100th career win in 2007. Tuberville is the only Auburn football coach to beat in-state rival Alabama six consecutive times. In 2015, he was the president of the American Football Coaches Association. He worked for ESPN as a color analyst for its college football coverage during 2017.

In his first political campaign, Tuberville ran for Senate in 2020, winning the Republican primary and defeating Democratic incumbent Doug Jones. Establishing himself as an ally of President Donald Trump, he was among a group of Republican senators who voted to object to the certification of the 2020 presidential election. In 2023, in protest of a Defense Department policy reimbursing travel for soldiers seeking abortions, Tuberville blocked all promotions of senior officers in the U.S. military for 10 months, delaying over 450 promotions. He initially planned to run for reelection, but later announced that he would instead run in the 2026 Alabama gubernatorial election, which he won.

== Early life and education ==
Tuberville was born and raised in Camden, Arkansas, one of three children of Olive Nell (née Chambliss) and Charles R. Tuberville Jr. He graduated from Harmony Grove High School in Camden in 1972. He attended Southern State College (now Southern Arkansas University), where he lettered in football as a safety for the Muleriders and played two years on the golf team. He received a B.S. in physical education from SSC in 1976. In 2008, he was inducted into the Southern Arkansas University Sports Hall of Fame and the Arkansas Sports Hall of Fame.

== Coaching career ==
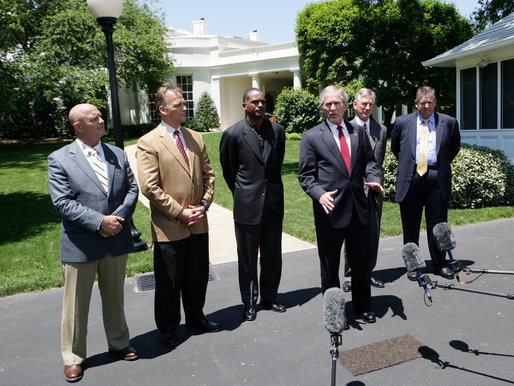
From left to right, Jack Siedlecki of Yale University, Mark Richt of the University of Georgia, Randy Shannon of the University of Miami, Tommy Tuberville of Auburn University and Charlie Weis of the University of Notre Dame watch President George W. Bush speak to reporters in May 2008

=== Early career ===
Tuberville first coached at Hermitage High School in Hermitage, Arkansas. He was an assistant coach at Arkansas State University. He then went through the ranks at the University of Miami, beginning as graduate assistant and ending as defensive coordinator in 1993, winning the national championship three times during his tenure there (1986–1994). In 1994, Tuberville replaced Bob Davie as defensive coordinator under R. C. Slocum at Texas A&M University. The Aggies went 10–0–1 that season.

=== Ole Miss ===
Tuberville got his first collegiate head coaching job in 1994 at the University of Mississippi ("Ole Miss"). Despite taking over a Rebels team under severe NCAA scholarship sanctions, he was named the SEC Coach of the Year in 1997 by the AP.

At Ole Miss, Tuberville became involved in the movement to ban Confederate flags from the football stadium by requesting that the students quit waving them during the home football games. He said, "We can't recruit against the Confederate flag." Ole Miss's chancellor, Robert Khayat, ultimately placed a ban on sticks at football games, which effectively banned spectators from waving flags.

During his tenure, Tuberville was known as the "Riverboat Gambler" for his aggressive play-calling, especially on fourth down. His teams went 1–3 against Arkansas and 2–2 against in-state arch-rival Mississippi State in the annual Egg Bowl game. After the 1998 regular season ended, Tuberville said, "They'll have to carry me out of here in a pine box", in reference to not leaving to coach at another school. Less than a week later, it was announced that he was departing for Auburn.

=== Auburn ===
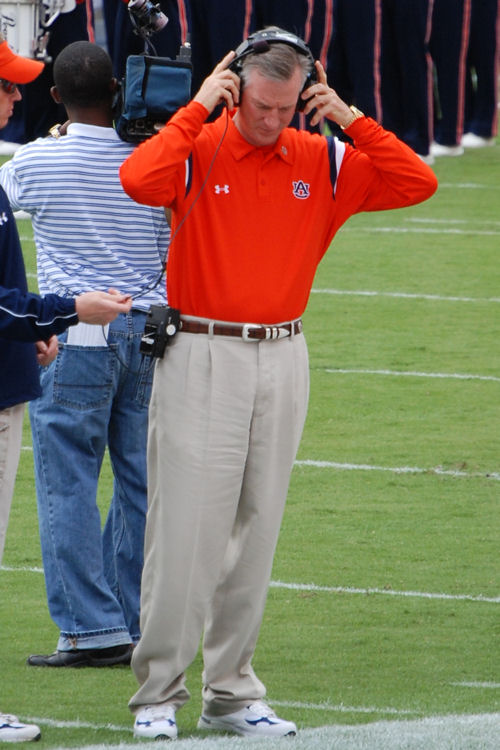
Tuberville before the 2007 Vanderbilt game, his 100th career win

Tuberville left Ole Miss after the 1998 season to take the head coaching job at Auburn University in Alabama. At Auburn, he guided the Tigers to the top of the SEC standings, leading them to an SEC championship and the Western Division title in 2004. Under his direction, the Tigers made eight consecutive bowl appearances, including five New Year's Day bowl berths.

During the 1999 off-season, wide receiver Clifton Robinson was charged with statutory rape of a 15-year-old girl. Tuberville suspended Robinson from the team from March to August, when Robinson pleaded guilty to a misdemeanor charge of contributing to the delinquency of a minor and was sentenced to 200 hours of community service. Tuberville subsequently punished Robinson by suspending him for the season opener, then allowed him to rejoin the team.

In 2004, Auburn went 13–0, including the SEC title and a win over Virginia Tech in the Sugar Bowl. Nine selectors, including six of the Massey Index selectors, named Auburn as the national champions. Additionally, Auburn was the highest-ranked NCAA eligible team in final AP and Coaches polls after USC's bowl win was vacated. Tuberville was named college football coach of the year by the Associated Press, the American Football Coaches Association, the National Sportscasters and Sportswriters Association, and the Walter Camp Football Foundation.

In 2005, despite losing the entire starting backfield from the unbeaten 2004 team to the first round of the NFL draft, Tuberville led Auburn to a 9–3 record, finishing the regular season with victories over rivals Georgia and Alabama.

Under Tuberville, Auburn had a winning record against its biggest rival, Alabama (7–3), and was tied with its next two most significant rivals, Georgia (5–5) and LSU (5–5). He was also 5–5 against Arkansas. He led Auburn to six straight victories over in-state rival Alabama, the longest win streak in this rivalry since 1982, the year Auburn broke Alabama's nine-year winning streak.

Tuberville established himself as one of the best big-game coaches in college football, winning 9 of his last 15 games against top-10 opponents since the start of the 2004 season. In 2006, his Tigers beat two top-5 teams that later played in BCS bowls, including eventual BCS Champion Florida. Tuberville had a 5–2 career record against top-5 teams, including three wins against Florida. But he developed a reputation for losing games when he clearly had the better team. Examples include a humbling 24-point loss to a 4–5 Alabama team in 2001 and a loss to Vanderbilt—the first time Auburn lost to the Commodores in over 50 years. After Auburn lost three straight SEC games in 2003, Auburn booster Bobby Lowder and Auburn president and athletic director contacted then Louisville head coach Bobby Petrino to gauge his interest in taking the Auburn job if Tuberville was fired. The press found out about the meeting, which occurred just before the 2003 Alabama game, and the episode has since been known as "JetGate".

Tuberville coached 19 players who were selected in the NFL draft, including four first-round picks in 2004, with several others signing as free agents. He coached eight All-Americans and a Thorpe Award winner (Carlos Rogers). Thirty-four players under Tuberville were named to All-SEC (First Team). Eighteen were named All-SEC freshman. His players were named SEC player of the week 46 times. He also had two SEC players of the year and one SEC Championship game MVP.

Tuberville fired offensive coordinator Tony Franklin on October 8, 2008. After the 2008 season, with a 5–7 record including losses to Vanderbilt, West Virginia, and a final 36–0 loss to Alabama, Tuberville resigned. Auburn athletic director Jay Jacobs said, "To say the least, I was a little shocked. But after three times of asking him would he change his mind, he convinced me that the best thing for him and his family and for this football program was for him to possibly take a year off and take a step back." With his departure, Tuberville was paid a prorated buyout of $5.1 million. The payments included $3 million within 30 days of his resignation date and the remainder within a year.

After his departure from Auburn, during the 2009 football season, Tuberville worked as an analyst for Buster Sports and ESPN, discussing the SEC and the Top 25 on various television shows and podcasts. He also made a cameo appearance in the Academy Award-winning feature film The Blind Side.

=== Texas Tech ===
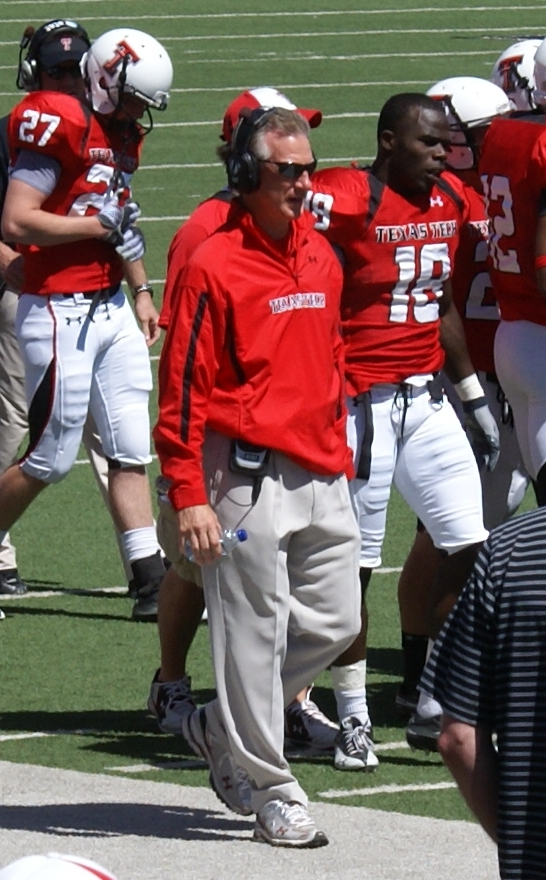
Tuberville during the 2011 Texas Tech Red Raiders Spring Game

On December 31, 2009, Tuberville expressed interest in becoming head coach of the Texas Tech Red Raiders. The position was left open after the university fired Mike Leach. On January 9, 2010, Tuberville was named head coach, and he was introduced at a press conference the next day. On January 1, 2011, he became the second head coach in Texas Tech football history to win a bowl game in his first season—an accomplishment unmatched since DeWitt Weaver's first season in 1951–52. This was a 45–38 victory over Northwestern in the inaugural TicketCity Bowl.

On January 18, 2011, Texas Tech announced that Tuberville received a one-year contract extension and a $500,000 per year raise. The extension and raise gave Tuberville a $2 million salary through the 2015 season. Tuberville was responsible for the highest-rated recruiting class in Texas Tech history, securing the 18th-ranked recruiting class in 2011, according to Rivals.com and the 14th-ranked class in the country according to Scout.com.

On November 10, 2012, during a game against Kansas, Tuberville yanked the hat and headset off his graduate assistant Kevin Oliver. Immediately after the game, Tuberville said he was aiming for Oliver's shirt in an attempt to pull him off the field. Two days later, he apologized in his weekly press conference, saying he wanted to set a better example for his two sons, one of whom was on the team. Big 12 commissioner Bob Bowlsby publicly reprimanded Tuberville, calling his act "unsportsmanlike".

Although Tuberville continued to run Leach's wide-open "Air Raid" spread offense, he was never really embraced by a fan base still smarting over Leach's ouster. According to a student on a recruiting trip to Texas Tech, Tuberville departed a recruiting dinner mid-meal and the next day accepted an offer to become Cincinnati's head coach. He left Texas Tech with an overall record of 20–17 and 9–17 in Big 12 conference play.

In 2025, Tuberville said he recruited Patrick Mahomes, who played at Texas Tech from 2014 to 2016, but Mahomes said that was not true.

=== Cincinnati ===
On December 8, 2012, Tuberville resigned as head coach at Texas Tech in order to become the 38th head coach at the University of Cincinnati. He signed a $2.2 million contract to coach the team. Cincinnati's athletic director, Whit Babcock, had previously worked with Tuberville at Auburn; the two had been friends for several years. On December 9, a Lubbock Avalanche-Journal article pointed out that Cincinnati is only 30 miles (50 km) from Guilford, Indiana, home of Tuberville's wife, Suzanne.

In 2013, his first season with Cincinnati, Tuberville led the Bearcats to an overall record of 9–4 and a 6–2 conference record. His 2014 team was also 9–4 overall, but this time earned an American Athletic Conference co-championship by virtue of their 7–1 league mark. Both years also saw bowl losses, in 2013 to North Carolina and 2014 to Virginia Tech.

On December 4, 2016, after a 4–8 season, Tuberville resigned as head coach of Cincinnati. He left Cincinnati with an overall record of 29–22 and 18–14 in AAC conference play.

== TS Capital ==
After resigning from Auburn in December 2008, Tuberville formed a 50-50 partnership with former Lehman Brothers broker John David Stroud, creating TS Capital Management and TS Capital Partners, where he had an office and helped find investors. In February 2012, seven investors sued Tuberville and Stroud, saying they were defrauded of more than $1.7 million that they invested from 2008 to 2011. Tuberville's attorneys denied the allegations.

In May 2012, Stroud was indicted for fraudulent use of $5.2 million from various Auburn investment companies, including his partnerships with Tuberville; Tuberville was not charged. Tuberville said in court filings that he was also a victim, and had lost $450,000; he settled the investor lawsuit in October 2013 on undisclosed terms. In November 2013, Stroud pleaded guilty and received a 10-year sentence.

== Tommy Tuberville Foundation ==
In 2014, Tuberville founded the Tommy Tuberville Foundation. Its website said its purpose was "to recognize and support organizations and causes that connect with the beliefs and values of the Tuberville family: assisting our military and veterans; awareness, education and prevention of health issues, particularly among women and children; and, education and community initiatives."

Through its first five years, the foundation raised $289,599 but spent just $51,658 on charitable causes, tax records showed. This rate of 18% is less than the 65% that the Better Business Bureau says ethical charities should spend on their causes. In 2020, the Associated Press called the Tuberville Foundation "a questionable charity that raises money but gives very little away". Foundation officials said the tax filings did not reflect volunteer labor and donated materials used to refurbish veterans' homes.

In 2020, The New York Times reported that Tuberville campaign and foundation officials "produced internal records for 2018 that showed nearly $20,000 was raised for a temporary project to provide a retreat for veterans. But the records raised bookkeeping questions, since they showed more than $61,000 of 2018 revenue, roughly twice what the charity reported to the I.R.S. that year".

In 2021, the Washington Post reported, the foundation "reported it had $74,101 in revenue and spent just 12 percent of that, or $9,000, while $32,000 went to administrative costs (including nearly $12,400 to pay off a truck the charity purchased in 2018 for $27,369)". By the end of 2021, the foundation's website had gone defunct.

In July 2023, a spokesperson for Tuberville said that the foundation had been under audit and had paused its activities, but that Tuberville was reforming it.

== U.S. Senate ==
=== Election ===
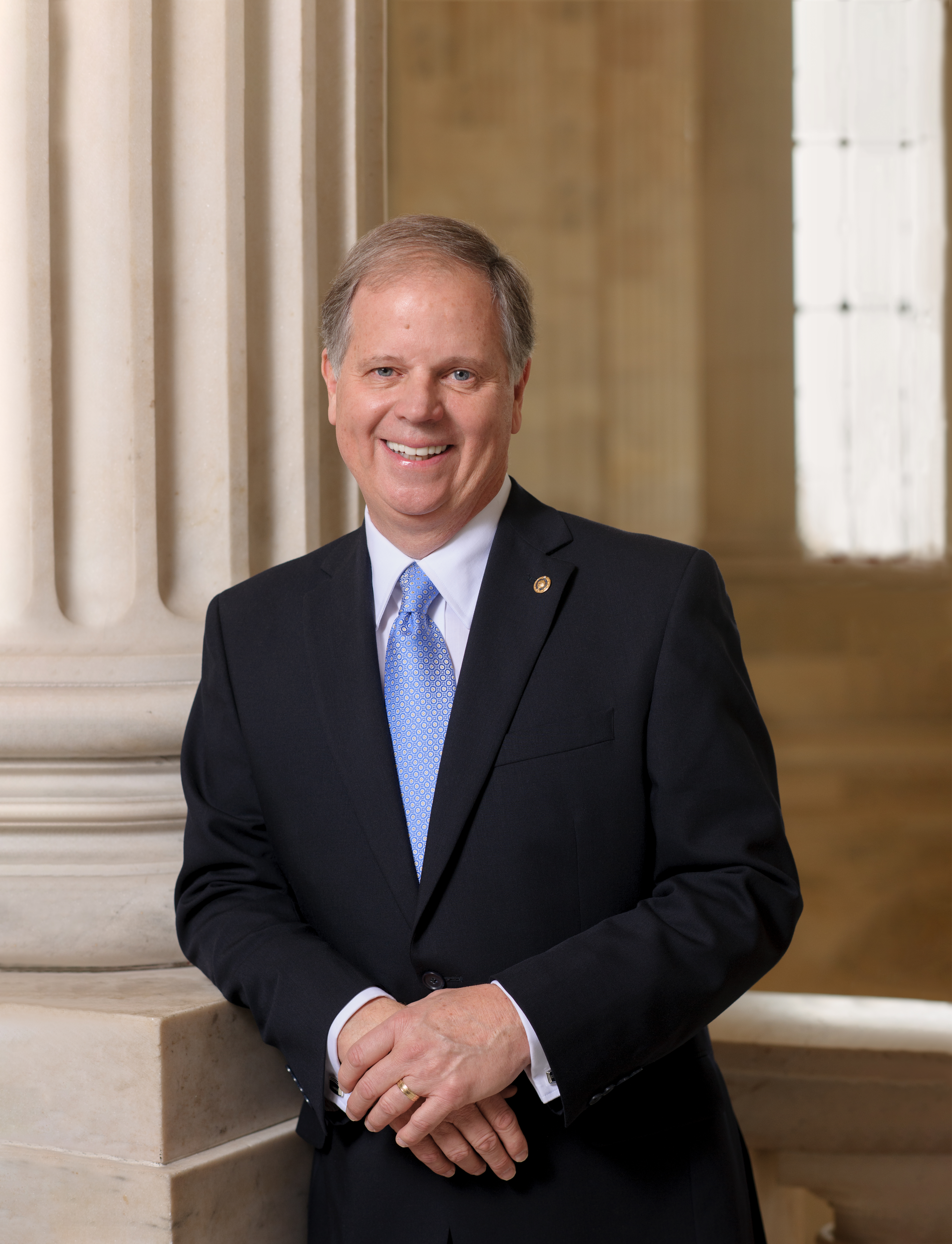
In the 2020 U.S. Senate race, Tuberville defeated incumbent Sen. Doug Jones

In August 2018, Tuberville moved from Florida to Alabama with the intention to run for the U.S. Senate in 2020. In April 2019, he announced he would enter the 2020 Republican primary for the Senate seat held by Democrat Doug Jones. Tuberville's campaign was described as "low-profile," with few pre-scheduled campaign appearances or press conferences. He closely allied himself with President Donald Trump. Former White House press secretary Sean Spicer was a member of Tuberville's campaign staff.

Tuberville opposes the right to an abortion and favors repealing the Affordable Care Act (Obamacare). He supports Trump's proposal to build a wall on the border with Mexico. Tuberville supports reducing the national debt through cuts to social programs, but opposes cuts to Social Security, Medicare, or Medicaid. He dismisses the science of climate change, saying that the global climate "won't change enough in the next 400 years to affect anybody."

On March 3, 2020, Tuberville received 33.4% of the vote in the Republican primary, ahead of former United States senator and former attorney general Jeff Sessions, who received 31.6%. Because neither candidate won over 50% of the vote, a runoff election ensued.

On March 10, ahead of the runoff election, Trump endorsed Tuberville. Trump had been angered by Sessions's decision to recuse himself from the investigation into Russian interference in the 2016 United States elections when Sessions was U.S. attorney general. In May 2020, Trump called Sessions "slime" for this decision. In campaign ads, Tuberville attacked Sessions for not being "man enough to stand with President Trump when things got tough." In the July 14 runoff, Tuberville defeated Sessions with 60.7% of the vote.

As the Republican nominee, Tuberville was heavily favored to win the election. He was endorsed by the National Right to Life Committee, America's largest anti-abortion organization. On November 3, he defeated Jones with 60.1% of the vote.

In an Alabama Daily News interview after the election, Tuberville said that the European theater of World War II was fought "to free Europe of socialism" and erroneously that the three branches of the U.S. federal government were "the House, the Senate, and the executive." He also said that he was looking forward to raising money from his Senate office, a violation of federal law. Tuberville's comments attracted criticism.

On November 26, 2020, Tuberville announced that his chief of staff would be Stephen Boyd, who had been serving as assistant attorney general for the Office of Legislative Affairs at the U.S. Department of Justice.

=== Tenure ===
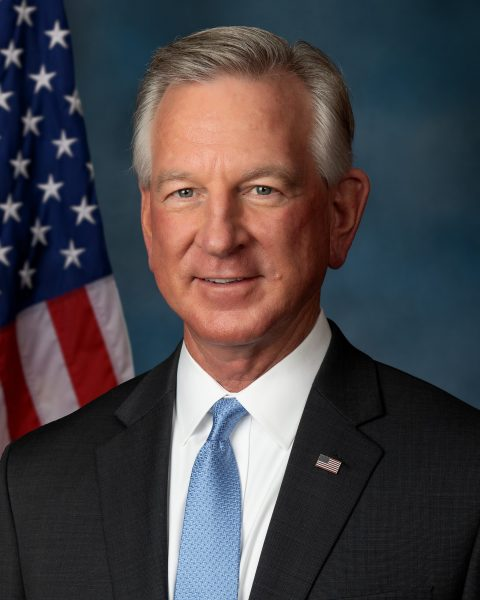
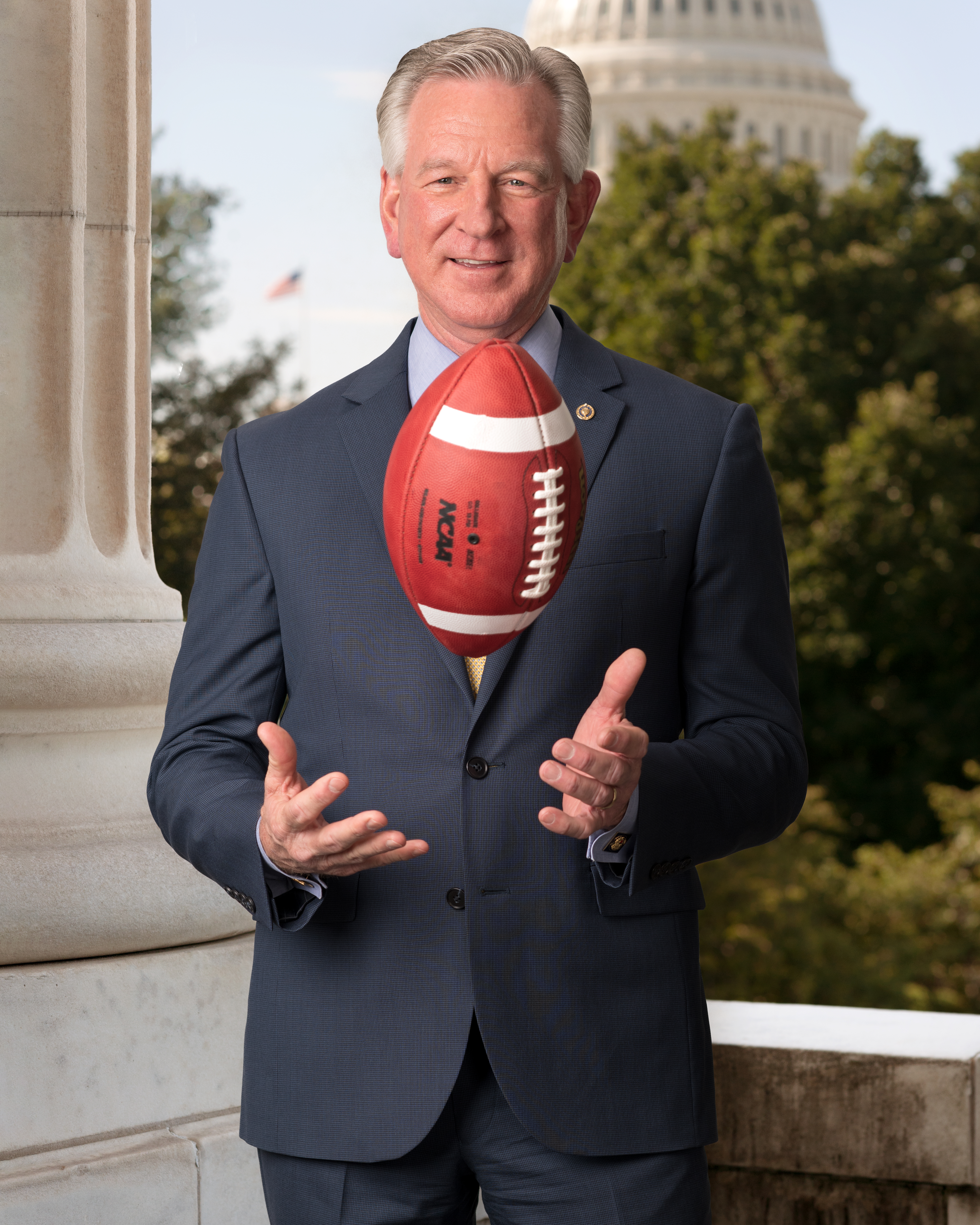
Tuberville during the 117th Congress: First official portrait soon after being sworn in (left); another portrait alludes to his earlier career as a football coach (right)

Tuberville was one of six Republican senators to vote against expanding the COVID-19 Hate Crimes Act, which would allow the U.S. Justice Department to review hate crimes related to COVID-19 and establish an online database.

Following the 2022 Russian invasion of Ukraine, Tuberville claimed that Putin had ordered the invasion because Russia could not feed its people and required Ukrainian farmland. He inaccurately called Russia a communist country (Russia abandoned communism after the collapse of the Soviet Union).

In May 2022, Tuberville introduced the Financial Freedom Act of 2022, which would allow for the inclusion of cryptocurrency in individual retirement accounts.

Speaking at a Trump rally in Nevada on October 8, 2022, Tuberville claimed that Democrats are "pro-crime", "want to take over what you've got", and "want reparation [sic] because they think the people that do the crime are owed that". These remarks were widely condemned as inaccurate and racist; for example, the NAACP called them "flat out racist, ignorant and utterly sickening".

Tuberville was among the 31 Senate Republicans who voted against final passage of the Fiscal Responsibility Act of 2023, telling reporters, "This bill does not go nearly far enough to reform our broken budget".

In June 2024, Tuberville called Ukrainian president Volodymyr Zelenskyy a "dictator" and said that Russian president Vladimir Putin "doesn't want Ukraine. He doesn't want Europe. Hell, he's got enough land of his own. He just wants to make sure he doesn't have United States weapons in Ukraine pointing at Moscow."

In June 2025, Tuberville drew backlash after appearing on Benny Johnson's show, where he called people in urban areas "inner-city rats" who "live off the federal government" and called on President Trump to "send them back home".

==== Objections to the 2020 U.S. presidential election ====
After taking office in January 2021, Tuberville joined a group of Republican senators who announced they would formally object to counting electoral votes won by Democratic president-elect Joe Biden in the 2020 presidential election. The objections were part of a continued effort by Trump and his allies to overturn his defeat in the election.

When the Electoral College count was held on January 6, pro-Trump rioters stormed the Capitol, forcing officials to evacuate their chambers before the count was completed. Trump contacted Tuberville during the riot through the cell phone of Utah senator Mike Lee, whom Trump misdialed. The count resumed that evening once the Capitol was secured.

Tuberville voted in support of an objection to Arizona's electoral votes and an objection to Pennsylvania's electoral votes, which were both won by Biden. He was one of six Republican senators to support the former objection and one of seven to support the latter objection; the remainder of the Senate defeated the objections. No further objections to the electoral votes were debated and the count concluded on the morning of January 7, certifying Biden's victory over Trump.

==== 2021 storming of the United States Capitol ====
On May 28, 2021, Tuberville voted against creating an independent commission to investigate the 2021 United States Capitol attack.

In January 2025, after Trump pardoned January 6 United States Capitol attack defendants on the first day of his second presidency, Tuberville told ABC News he fully supported the pardons. Asked about pardons for rioters who attacked police, Tuberville said: "I don't believe it because I didn't see it."

==== Dobbs v. Jackson Women's Health Organization ====
When Dobbs v. Jackson Women's Health Organization came before the Supreme Court in 2022, Tuberville signed an amicus brief supporting the overturning of Roe v. Wade and its federal protection of abortion. After Roe v. Wade was overturned in June 2022, Tuberville called it a "victory for life".

==== Same-sex marriage ====
In 2022, Tuberville responded to a question about the Respect for Marriage Act, which would federally codify same-sex marriage, by saying there was "no need for legislating on gay marriage". He also said, "I'm all about live life the way you want to. It's a free country." He voted against the bill, which passed and was signed into law.

==== Stock trading ====
Tuberville failed to timely disclose approximately 132 stock trades made between January and May 2021 that violated the STOCK Act. These transactions, valued between $894,000 and $3.56 million, were not reported to the Senate until several months after the legal deadline. He was found to have bought or sold stocks and options in 17 companies that had business before Senate committees on which he served, such as the Armed Services Committee.

In 2022, Tuberville dismissed proposals to ban lawmakers from trading stocks as "ridiculous".

==== Islam ====
In 2025, Tuberville and Senator John Cornyn introduced the "No Sharia" Act, which would prohibit the implementation of sharia, or Islamic law. On the Senate floor, Tuberville said, "Radical Islamists would like to see every freedom-loving American dead. This isn't politically correct to say, but it's true. If you live in America and practice sharia law, you should be deported immediately." He added that Muslim immigrants in Europe have "taken over France, Italy, the UK. That's been a process. Now they have all mayors from these from these Islamic countries, and so they're trying to change into sharia law [...] Wake up, America. They're here, they're on our shores, and they're trying to change our way of life." After the 2025 Washington, D.C., National Guard shooting, allegedly perpetrated by an Afghan immigrant, Tuberville called for a ban on Muslim immigration, writing on X: "We must IMMEDIATELY BAN all ISLAM immigrants and DEPORT every single Islamist who is living among us just waiting to attack."

Tuberville has called Islam a "cult" that is "incompatible with western values", telling an Infowars reporter, "Muslim communities are moving everywhere. In every state, they're building mosques, they're having these five prayers a day, they're pushing this cult on everybody across this country." Tuberville spoke out against the proposed move of the Islamic Academy of Alabama to Hoover, Alabama, saying, "If you believe in the Quran and go by sharia law and want to chant 'Death to America' and teach that nonsense in these schools, I don't want you here [...] Muslims go by the Quran. And the Quran is cited on the Islamic Academy of Alabama's website. The Quran says to kill all infidels. That means all people who don't believe in Islam." The academy's assistant principal denied that the school promoted sharia law or any political ideology. After the academy decided not to relocate, Tuberville said, "This week, the people of Hoover, Alabama, came together and sent a clear message. We do not want extremist Islamic indoctrination centers taking over our state [...] We're at war in this country with all the people that have come here from all over the world. And listen, we love immigration. We're...all a part of an immigrant family one time and the other. But a lot of people come here and they want to assimilate. Not the group coming here from the Muslim countries. They have an agenda." Tuberville told Steve Bannon, "Muslim immigrants are bringing World War III to American soil."

On the Alex Jones show, Tuberville accused members of Congress of supporting Hamas. The Council on American-Islamic Relations has accused Tuberville of fostering anti-Muslim bigotry. After Zohran Mamdani, a Muslim, was elected mayor of New York City, Tuberville said, "We lost New York. It will be completely Muslim in three or four years." Of Mamdani, who was born in Uganda, Tuberville said, "I think we ought to pack him up and send him home." He has called Mamdani an "openly jihadist terrorist sympathizer" and a "radical Islamist". When Ghazala Hashmi was sworn in as Lieutenant Governor of Virginia using a Quran, Tuberville wrote, "The enemy is inside the gates." In March 2026, Tuberville posted a photo of the September 11 attacks alongside Mamdani, again writing, "The enemy is inside the gates."

After the 2025 Brown University shooting, Tuberville suggested without evidence that the perpetrator was a jihadist. After the 2025 Bondi Beach shooting, Tuberville called for the mass expulsion of Muslims from the U.S. He wrote on X: "Islam is not a religion. It's a cult. Islamists aren't here to assimilate. They're here to conquer. Stop worrying about offending the pearl-clutchers. We've got to SEND THEM HOME NOW or we'll become the United Caliphate of America." Senate Minority Leader Chuck Schumer called the post an "outrageous, disgusting display of Islamophobia" that is "beneath a United States senator".

In August 2026, after Abdul El-Sayed won the Democratic nomination for the 2026 United States Senate election in Michigan, Tuberville called El-Sayed "a radical Islamist" and a "terrorist".

==== Veterans ====
In 2022, Tuberville was among the 11 senators who voted against the Honoring our PACT Act of 2022, a bill that provided funding for research and benefits for up to 3.5 million veterans exposed to toxic substances during their service.

==== Transgender policy ====
Tuberville has backed several bills intended to restrict various activities by transgender people.

In February 2023, he co-sponsored a bill to prevent people with a history or diagnosis of gender dysphoria from serving in the U.S. military, with limited exceptions.

In March 2023, he reintroduced a bill to forbid public schools from allowing a trans girl or woman to participate in a girl's or women's sport. Co-sponsored by 19 Republicans, the act says gender would be "recognized based solely on a person's reproductive biology and genetics at birth" rather than how a person identifies.

On March 25, 2023, Tuberville complained publicly about a video showing Lieutenant Junior Grade Audrey Knutson, who is nonbinary, reading a poem during a spoken-word event aboard the aircraft carrier USS Gerald R. Ford. The video had gone viral after the U.S. Navy posted it to its Instagram page. After Tuberville told the Senate Armed Services Committee that he had "a lot of problems with the video", Admiral Mike Gilday, chief of naval operations, said he was "particularly proud of this sailor" and added that if someone is "willing to serve and willing to take the same oath that you and I took to put their life on the line, then I'm proud to serve beside them."

On March 29, 2024, Tuberville accused the Democratic Party of being a "Satanic cult" in response to a tweet by the New York Post about the banning of religious-themed designs from the White House Easter Egg art contest. His comment came at a time of widespread backlash by right-wing to far-right politicians and pundits after Biden publicly acknowledged International Transgender Day of Visibility, which fell on the same date as Easter in 2024.

In January 2025, Tuberville said that transgender children should "live in fear" of their parents as he believed the parents were turning them trans, which Tuberville called "child abuse" and an "absolute disgrace". LGBTQ Nation refuted these claims, saying that "there is no evidence that a person who is not LGBTQ+ can be turned LGBTQ+ by their parents".

On September 23, 2026, Tuberville claimed without evidence that "deranged" transgender people and the furry fandom were tied to recent mass shootings, and that "many" furries (who he said have "a deranged fetish of dressing up like an animal") worked as aircraft pilots and air traffic controllers, while also proposing the reopening of mental institutions and suggesting that those convicted of providing gender-affirming care be incarcerated. Former senator Doug Jones called it the strangest Senate floor speech he had ever heard. Comedian Jimmy Kimmel satirized the speech on Jimmy Kimmel Live! that evening, saying he could not "think of a more serious made-up problem in this country right now than furries flying airplanes".

==== Hold on military nominations ====
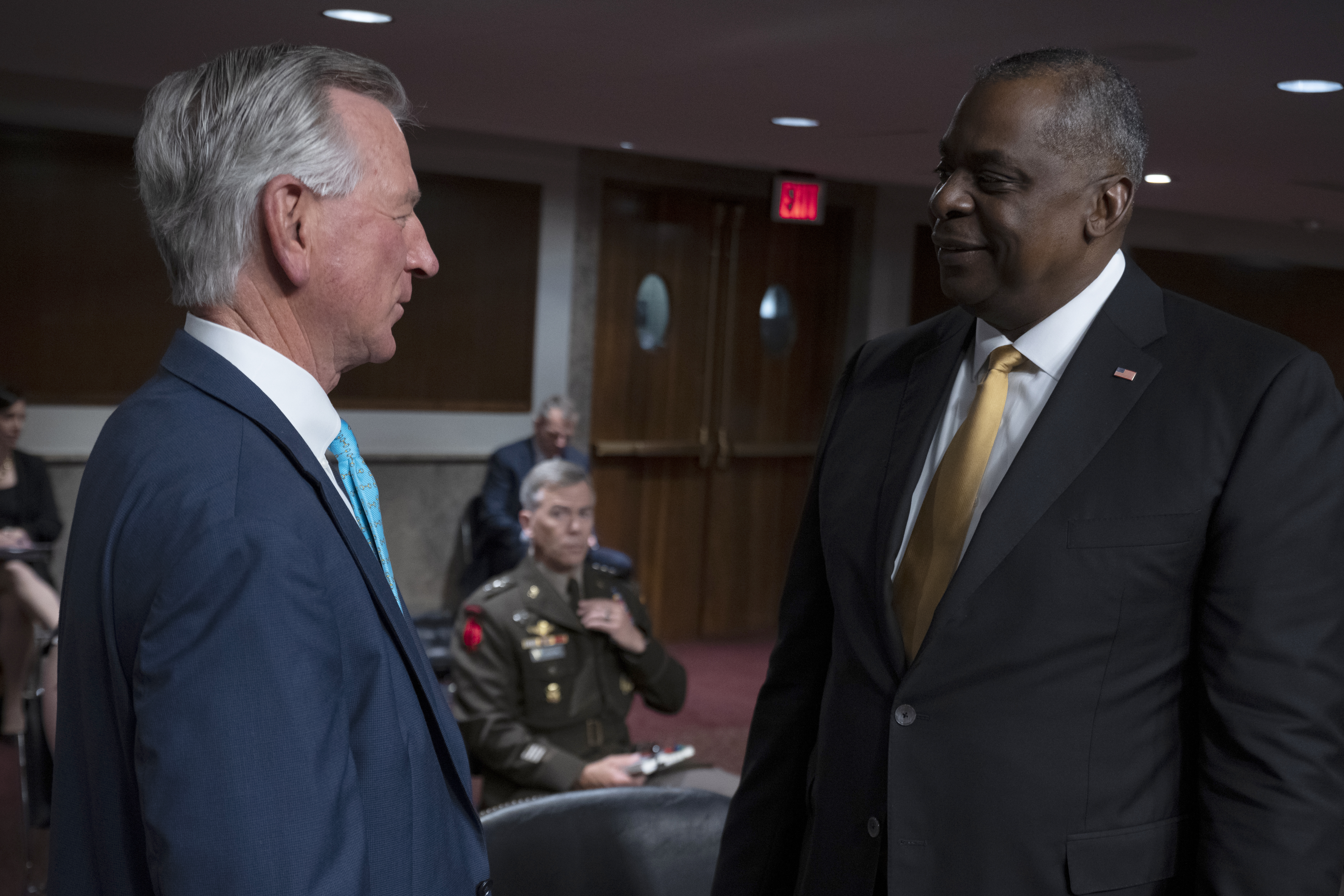
Tuberville speaks with U.S. Defense Secretary Lloyd Austin in June 2021.

In December 2022, after Defense Secretary Lloyd Austin announced an upcoming policy to allow pregnant service members leave and reimbursement of travel costs so that they may obtain legal abortions in the wake of the Supreme Court ruling overturning Roe v. Wade, Tuberville threatened to put a Senate hold on all military promotions in protest of the policy. The policy was instituted in February 2023, with Tuberville announcing a day later that he would hold all "civilian, flag, and general officer nominations" due to the "illegal expansion of DoD authority and gross misuse of taxpayer dollars" for abortions.

Over the next few months, Tuberville's hold blocked the filling of hundreds of senior positions. "Without these leaders in place, these holes severely limit the department's ability to ensure the right person is in place at the right time, and to ensure a strategic readiness and operational success", Pentagon deputy press secretary Sabrina Singh said on June 20. (Note: As of June 16, 2023, blocks have occurred for vacancies on the Joint Chiefs of Staff and over 200 general officer and flag officer nominations. On June 20, 2023, the Pentagon noted there are 64 three- and four-star nominations pending, with about 650 general and flag officers that will require Senate confirmation before the end of the year.)

On July 11, Tuberville blocked the confirmation of a new Marine Corps commandant, leaving the Corps without a leader for the first time in two centuries. By August, more than 300 generals, admirals, and policy officials had not yet been confirmed. The hold also blocked the appointment of a new Army chief of staff, vacant as of August 3, and a new chief of naval operations, vacant as of August 14. Five military commands at Redstone Arsenal in Alabama were also affected.

On September 20, the Senate, working around Tuberville's hold in a rarely used procedure, voted to confirm three of the highest-ranking officers: the Joint Chiefs chairman, Marine Corps commandant, and Army chief of staff. The move elevated Marine Corps general Eric Smith to commandant, but the hold prevented him from appointing a deputy commandant, a situation he called "not sustainable". On October 29, Smith was hospitalized after suffering a heart attack. Lacking a deputy commandant or other available four-star general, the Marine Corps tapped a lieutenant general to temporarily perform the duties of commandant.

On November 1, incensed senators brought dozens of military nominations to the floor; Tuberville blocked them all. The next day, the Senate confirmed a new chief of naval operations, a new Air Force chief of staff, and a new assistant commandant of the Marine Corps through a laborious process of circulating a cloture petition.

On December 5, 2023, Tuberville largely lifted his hold, which had blocked 451 promotions during the previous week; the Senate responded by promoting 425 military officers. But he retained his hold on 11 officers nominated for four-star positions. On December 19, he lifted the hold on the final 11 officers, ending the matter.

==== Gaza ====
In 2025, Tuberville praised Trump's proposal to have the U.S. take over the Gaza Strip, calling it "a good idea".

==== Comments on white nationalists ====
On May 10, 2023, Birmingham-area radio station WBHM broadcast an interview in which Tuberville was asked whether he believed white nationalists should be allowed to serve in the military. Tuberville said the Biden administration "call[s] them that. I call them Americans." Later that day, his congressional staff released a statement that said Tuberville "was being skeptical of the notion that there are white nationalists in the military, not that he believes they should be in the military." U.S. military leaders have said extremism in the ranks is growing. For example, an October 2020 Pentagon report said there were "white supremacist inroads in the U.S. military". Much independent reporting indicates this as well.

After the interview, Tuberville's brother Charles said he felt "compelled to distance himself" from Tuberville and his "ignorant, hateful rants" and "vile rhetoric".

In July 2023, CNN's Kaitlan Collins asked Tuberville about his earlier comments on white nationalists, whom she defined as "someone who believes that the white race is superior to other races". Tuberville called that an "opinion". He then denied white nationalists are inherently racist. Tuberville's refusal to accept the definition of a white nationalist drew heavy criticism from Democrats and Republican senators. A day later, Tuberville reversed his statement, saying, "White nationalists are racists."

In June 2025, during a podcast appearance with Benny Johnson, Tuberville railed against "inner-city rats" he said are "living off the American taxpayers" and advocated that President Trump defund U.S. cities governed by Democrats. He also claimed that The Great Replacement is happening.

==== Threats against Tuberville ====
In June 2023, a New Hampshire resident was arrested and charged with threatening to assault, kidnap or murder a member of Congress. The charging documents did not name Tuberville as the target, but did say the charge was connected to his 2023 hold on military promotions.

In October 2023, Michael Hayden, a retired Air Force general and former director of the Central Intelligence Agency, responded to a social-media post asking whether Tuberville should be removed from his committee assignments by saying, "How about the human race?" After some interpreted this as a call for Tuberville's assassination, Hayden said he was suggesting that the senator not be considered human. Tuberville reported the comment to the United States Capitol Police, saying that Hayden had called for his "politically motivated assassination".

On December 24, 2023, Tuberville was doxxed and swatted, along with other leading activists and politicians in the same period.

==== Department of Veterans Affairs ====
At a March 11, 2025, Committee on Veterans Affairs hearing on the mass termination of VA employees, Tuberville said that private companies with proprietary technology had solicited him to receive contracts to operate at the VA, and that these private companies would benefit the VA and should be strongly considered.

=== Committee assignments ===
- Committee on Agriculture, Nutrition, and Forestry
  - Subcommittee on Commodities, Derivatives, Risk Management, and Trade
  - Subcommittee on Food and Nutrition, Specialty Crops, Organics, and Research
  - Subcommittee on Rural Development, Energy, and Credit
- Committee on Armed Services
  - Subcommittee on Personnel (Chairman)
  - Subcommittee on Seapower
  - Subcommittee on Strategic Forces
- Committee on Health, Education, Labor and Pensions
  - Subcommittee on Education and the American Family (Chairman)
  - Subcommittee on Employment and Workplace Safety
- Committee on Veterans' Affairs
- Select Committee on Aging

== Governor of Alabama ==
On May 27, 2025, Tuberville announced that he would not seek a second term in the United States Senate and would instead run for governor of Alabama. Facing no major challengers, Tuberville won the Republican nomination on May 19, 2026.

Tuberville has faced several challenges to his eligibility for the gubernatorial office, with opponents alleging that he does not satisfy a seven-year Alabama residency requirement set out in the Constitution of Alabama.

On November 4, 2026, he was declared the winner by the Associated Press. He won 52% to Jones's 48%, making it the closest gubernatorial election in Alabama since 2002.

== Personal life ==
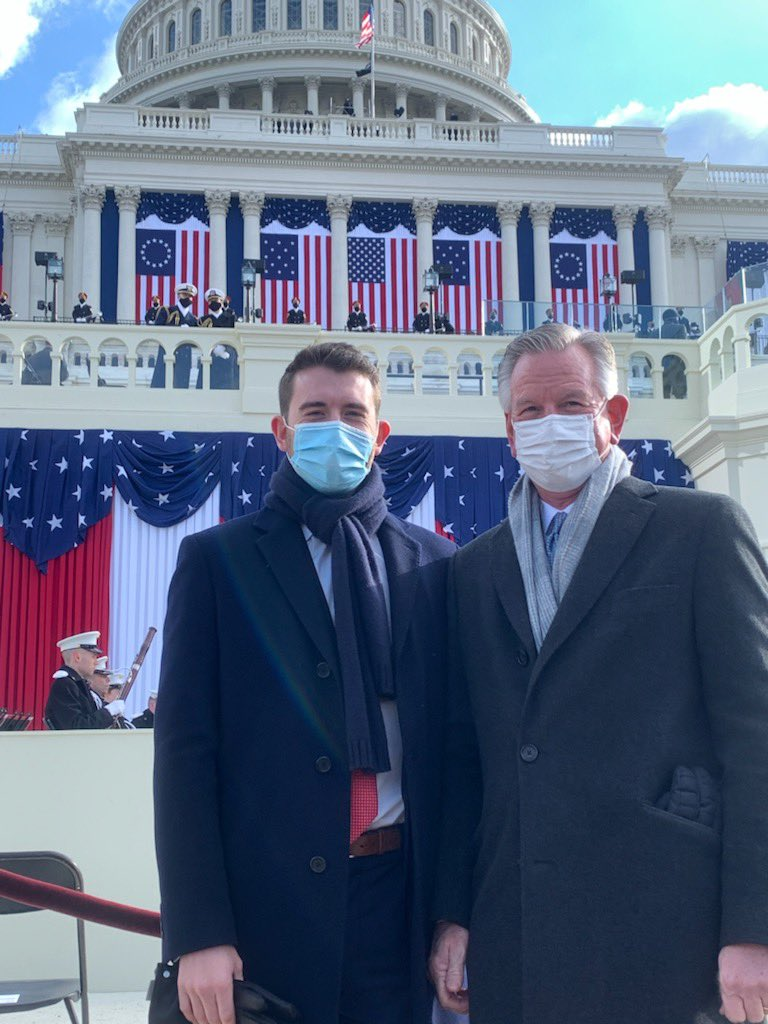
Tuberville with his son Tucker at the inauguration of Joe Biden

Tuberville married Vicki Lynn Harris, also from Camden, Arkansas, and a graduate of Harmony Grove High School, on December 19, 1976. They later divorced. In 1991, Tuberville married Suzanne (née Fette) of Guilford, Indiana; they have two sons. His elder son, Tucker, played as a quarterback while he was coach at Texas Tech, before following him to Cincinnati. Tucker then walked-on at Auburn, where he was used as a scout team quarterback during his three seasons there, and made his sole appearance for the team in the fourth quarter of a 56–34 win over Idaho.

Tuberville has a brother, Charles.

Tuberville invested $1.9 million in GLC Enterprises, which the Securities and Exchange Commission called an $80 million Ponzi scheme. He lost about $150,000 when the business closed in 2011.

At Auburn, Tuberville participated in the Auburn Church of Christ.

Tuberville's interests include "NASCAR, golf, football, hunting and fishing, [and] America's military". He enjoys country and western music. Tuberville is also a fan of Filipino boxer Manny Pacquiao.

In August 2023, The Washington Post reported that campaign finance and property records indicate that Tuberville lives in Santa Rosa Beach, Florida, instead of Auburn, Alabama, as his office claims, and has for almost two decades. Despite filing taxes as an Alabama resident in 2018, Tuberville voted in the Florida election that year. The United States Constitution requires senators to live in the state where they are elected, but does not provide a minimum length of residency; Alabama requires a candidate to reside in the state for just one day to run for office. But Alabama's Constitution requires that governors be "resident citizens of this state at least seven years next before the date of their election."

== Head coaching record ==
=== College ===
Year	Team	Overall	Conference	Standing	Bowl/playoffs	Coaches^{#}	AP^{°}
Ole Miss Rebels (Southeastern Conference) (1995–1998)
1995	Ole Miss	6–5	3–5	5th (Western)			
1996	Ole Miss	5–6	2–6	T–5th (Western)			
1997	Ole Miss	8–4	4–4	T–3rd (Western)	W Motor City	22	22
1998	Ole Miss	6–5	3–5	4th (Western)	Independence*		
Ole Miss:		25–20	12–20	* Bowl game coached by David Cutcliffe			
Auburn Tigers (Southeastern Conference) (1999–2008)
1999	Auburn	5–6	2–6	5th (Western)			
2000	Auburn	9–4	6–2	1st (Western)	L Florida Citrus	20	18
2001	Auburn	7–5	5–3	T–1st (Western)	L Peach		
2002	Auburn	9–4	5–3	T–2nd (Western) (Note: In 2002, Alabama finished first in Western Division of the Southeastern Conference (SEC) with a conference record of 6–2, but was ineligible for the division title or postseason play as part of a penalty for National Collegiate Athletic Association (NCAA) violations. Auburn, Arkansas, and LSU tied for second place, each with a 5–3 mark in the conference, and were named co-champions. Arkansas was awarded a berth in the SEC Championship Game by virtue of their head-to-head wins over Auburn and LSU.)	W Capital One	16	14
2003	Auburn	8–5	5–3	3rd (Western)	W Music City		
2004	Auburn	13–0	8–0	1st (Western)	W Sugar^{†}	2	2
2005	Auburn	9–3	7–1	T–1st (Western)	L Capital One	14	14
2006	Auburn	11–2	6–2	T–2nd (Western)	W Cotton	8	9
2007	Auburn	9–4	5–3	2nd (Western)	W Chick-fil-A	14	15
2008	Auburn	5–7	2–6	T–4th (Western)			
Auburn:		85–40	51–29				
Texas Tech Red Raiders (Big 12 Conference) (2010–2012)
2010	Texas Tech	8–5	3–5	5th (South)	W TicketCity		
2011	Texas Tech	5–7	2–7	9th			
2012	Texas Tech	7–5	4–5	T–5th	Meineke Car Care*		
Texas Tech:		20–17	9–17	* Bowl game coached by Chris Thomsen			
Cincinnati Bearcats (American Athletic Conference) (2013–2016)
2013	Cincinnati	9–4	6–2	3rd	L Belk		
2014	Cincinnati	9–4	7–1	T–1st	L Military		
2015	Cincinnati	7–6	4–4	T–3rd (East)	L Hawaii		
2016	Cincinnati	4–8	1–7	T–4th (East)			
Cincinnati:		29–22	18–14				
Total:		159–99					
National championship Conference title Conference division title or championship game berth
^{†}Indicates BCS bowl.; ^{#}Rankings from final Coaches Poll.; ^{°}Rankings from final AP Poll.

=== High school ===
Year	Team	Overall	Conference	Standing	Bowl/playoffs
Hermitage Hermits () (1978–1979)
1978	Hermitage	4–6	1–3		
1979	Hermitage	5–4	2–2		
Hermitage:		9–10	3–5		
Total:		9–10			

== Electoral history ==
Republican primary for the 2020 United States Senate election in Alabama
Party	Candidate	Votes	%
Republican	Tommy Tuberville	239,616	33.39%
Republican	Jeff Sessions	227,088	31.64%
Republican	Bradley Byrne	178,627	24.89%
Republican	Roy Moore	51,377	7.16%
Republican	Ruth Page Nelson	7,200	1.00%
Republican	Arnold Mooney	7,149	1.00%
Republican	Stanley Adair	6,608	0.92%
Total votes		717,665	100.00%

Republican primary runoff for the 2020 United States Senate election in Alabama
Party	Candidate	Votes	%
Republican	Tommy Tuberville	334,675	60.73%
Republican	Jeff Sessions	216,452	39.27%
Total votes		551,127	100.00%

2020 United States Senate election in Alabama
Party	Candidate	Votes	%	±%
Republican	Tommy Tuberville	1,392,076	60.10%	+11.76%
Democratic	Doug Jones (incumbent)	920,478	39.74%	−10.23%
Write-in		3,891	0.17%	−1.52%
Total votes		2,316,445	100.00%	N/A

== Notes ==
Party political offices
Preceded by Roy Moore	Republican nominee for U.S. Senator from Alabama (Class 2); 2020	Succeeded by Barry Moore
Preceded by Kay Ivey	Republican nominee for Governor of Alabama; 2026	Most recent
U.S. Senate
Preceded by Doug Jones	U.S. Senator (Class 2) from Alabama; 2021–present Served alongside: Richard Shelby, Katie Britt	Incumbent
Political offices
Preceded by Kay Ivey	Governor of Alabama; Taking office 2027	Elect
U.S. order of precedence (ceremonial)
Preceded by Bill Hagerty	Order of precedence of the United States as United States Senator	Succeeded by Roger Marshall
Preceded by Bill Hagerty	United States senators by seniority 75th	Succeeded by Alex Padilla
