= National Register of Historic Places listings in Bradley County, Arkansas =

Location of Bradley County in Arkansas

This is a list of the National Register of Historic Places listings in Bradley County, Arkansas.

This is intended to be a complete list of the properties on the National Register of Historic Places in Bradley County, Arkansas, United States. The locations of National Register properties for which the latitude and longitude coordinates are included below, may be seen in a map.

There are 17 properties listed on the National Register in the county.

Contents: Counties in Arkansas
- Arkansas
- Ashley
- Baxter
- Benton
- Boone
- Bradley
- Calhoun
- Carroll
- Chicot
- Clark
- Clay
- Cleburne
- Cleveland
- Columbia
- Conway
- Craighead
- Crawford
- Crittenden
- Cross
- Dallas
- Desha
- Drew
- Faulkner
- Franklin
- Fulton
- Garland
- Grant
- Greene
- Hempstead
- Hot Spring
- Howard
- Independence
- Izard
- Jackson
- Jefferson
- Johnson
- Lafayette
- Lawrence
- Lee
- Lincoln
- Little River
- Logan
- Lonoke
- Madison
- Marion
- Miller
- Mississippi
- Monroe
- Montgomery
- Nevada
- Newton
- Ouachita
- Perry
- Phillips
- Pike
- Poinsett
- Polk
- Pope
- Prairie
- Pulaski (Little Rock)
- Randolph
- St. Francis
- Saline
- Scott
- Searcy
- Sebastian
- Sevier
- Sharp
- Stone
- Union
- Van Buren
- Washington
- White
- Woodruff
- Yell

This National Park Service list is complete through NPS recent listings posted December 19, 2025.

== Current listings ==
	Name on the Register	Image	Date listed	Location	City or town	Description
1	Adams-Leslie House	Adams-Leslie House	August 9, 1979 (#79000433)	South of Warren; 33°31′14″N 92°05′41″W	Warren	1903 folk-Victorian house
2	Bailey House	Bailey House	August 28, 1975 (#75000375)	302 Chestnut St. 33°36′57″N 92°03′43″W	Warren	1900 home of drugstore owner and CSA veteran
3	Blankinship Motor Company Building	Blankinship Motor Company Building	November 2, 2001 (#01001190)	120 E. Cypress St. 33°36′51″N 92°03′52″W	Warren	1940 Art Moderne automobile dealership designed by H. Ray Burks
4	Bradley County Courthouse and Clerk's Office	Bradley County Courthouse and Clerk's Office	December 12, 1976 (#76000389)	Courthouse Sq. 33°36′53″N 92°03′48″W	Warren	1903 courthouse with neoclassical details
5	Davis-Adams House	Davis-Adams House	February 18, 1999 (#99000224)	509 N. Myrtle St. 33°37′08″N 92°03′49″W	Warren	1860 I-frame house with folk-Victorian details added later
6	Ederington House	Ederington House	June 21, 1984 (#84000660)	326 S. Main St. 33°36′37″N 92°03′52″W	Warren	1926 craftsman style house designed by H. Ray Burks
7	Hermitage City Hall and Jail	Hermitage City Hall and Jail	September 19, 2007 (#07000956)	112 S. Oak St. 33°27′03″N 92°10′24″W	Hermitage	1945 brick city hall and jail
8	Dr. John Wilson Martin House	Dr. John Wilson Martin House	December 27, 1990 (#90001948)	200 Ash St. 33°37′00″N 92°04′04″W	Warren	1860-1868 vernacular Greek revival house
9	MORO BAY FERRY (towboat and barge)		September 19, 2018 (#100002944)	670 Highway 600 (Moro Bay State Park); 33°18′04″N 92°21′00″W	Moro Bay	
10	Mt. Olive Rosenwald School	Mt. Olive Rosenwald School	January 21, 2004 (#03001454)	Bradley Rd. 45; 33°25′41″N 92°03′33″W	Mount Olive	1927 Colonial revival house built with funds from the Julius Rosenwald Fund
11	New Zion AME Zion Church	New Zion AME Zion Church	June 9, 2000 (#00000628)	Junction of Myrtle and Neely Sts. 33°37′33″N 92°04′05″W	Warren	1927 church with a historically black congregation
12	St. Luke's Catholic Church	St. Luke's Catholic Church	May 29, 1998 (#98000581)	508 W. Pine; 33°37′04″N 92°04′54″W	Warren	1907 Gothic revival style church
13	Warren and Ouachita Valley Railway Station	Warren and Ouachita Valley Railway Station	August 3, 1977 (#77000244)	325 W. Cedar St. 33°36′54″N 92°04′05″W	Warren	1909 wooden frame structure rebuilt following a fire in 1911
14	Warren Brick Streets	Warren Brick Streets	January 24, 2007 (#06001277)	Portions of Cedar, Myrtle, Chestnut, 1st, Walnut, Elm, and Cypress Sts. 33°36′52″N 92°03′45″W	Warren	1927 brick-surfaced streets
15	Warren Commercial Historic District	Warren Commercial Historic District	July 11, 2016 (#16000433)	Roughly bounded by Alabama, Elm, Chestnut, 2nd, Church, Main & Howard Sts. 33°36′46″N 92°03′52″W	Warren	
16	Warren Post Office	Warren Post Office	January 21, 2004 (#03001460)	236 S. Main St. (U.S. Route 63 Business); 33°36′45″N 92°03′53″W	Warren	1935 Colonial revival post office
17	Wilson-Martin House	Wilson-Martin House	September 20, 2006 (#06000827)	511 Bond St. 33°37′13″N 92°03′57″W	Warren	1916 house with Georgian details

== See also ==
- List of National Historic Landmarks in Arkansas
- National Register of Historic Places listings in Arkansas
