= Hermitage City Hall and Jail =

- U.S. National Register of Historic Places
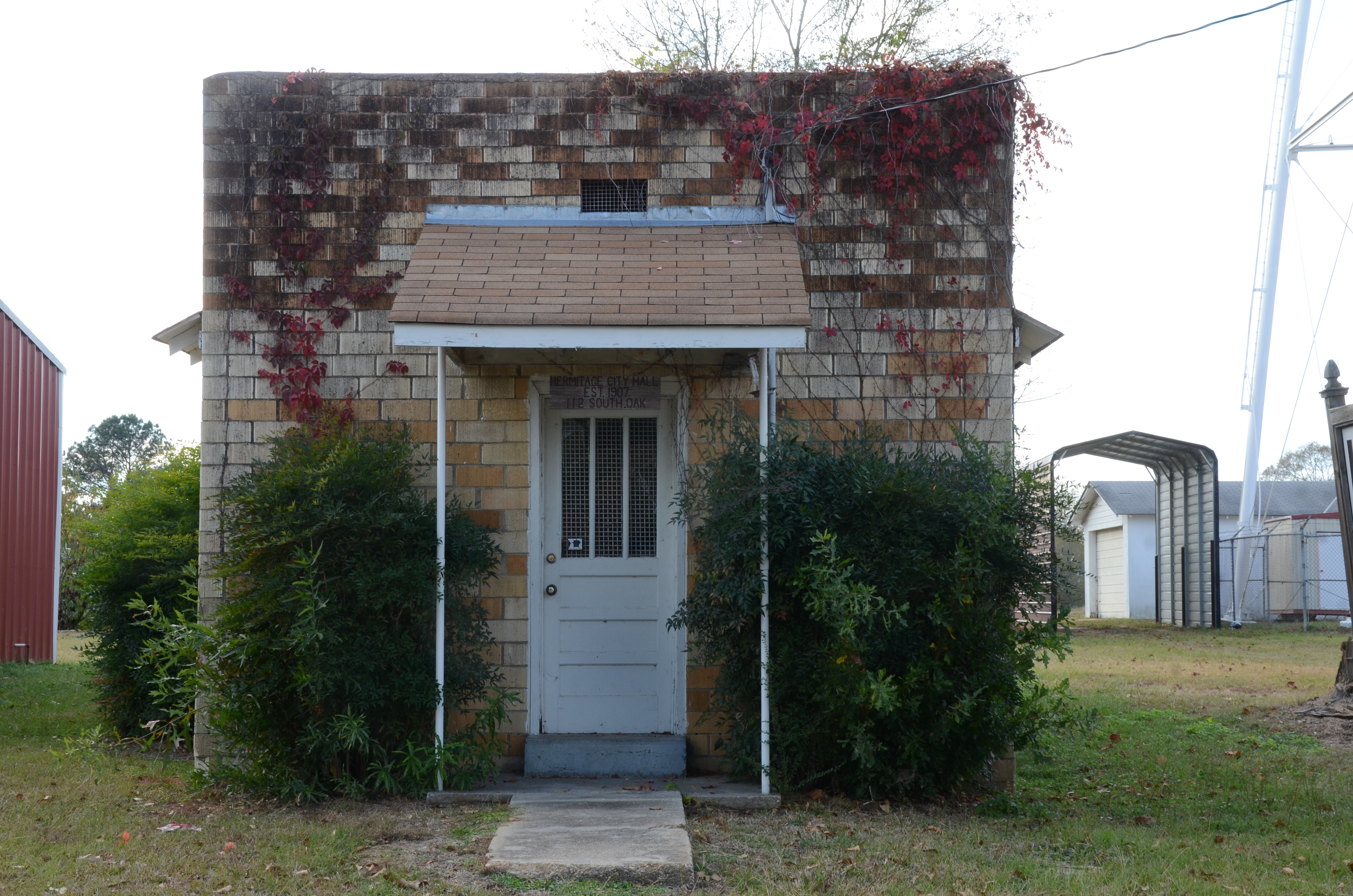

- Location within Arkansas Location within the United States
- Location: 112 S. Oak St., Hermitage, Arkansas
- Coordinates: 33°27′3″N 92°10′24″W
- Area: less than one acre
- Built: 1945
- Architectural style: Plain-Traditional
- NRHP reference No.: 07000956
- Added to NRHP: September 19, 2007

Hermitage City Hall and Jail is a historic building at 112 South Oak Street in Hermitage, Arkansas. A modest single story yellow brick building probably built in the 1940s, its front section served as Hermitage City Hall, and the rear as the city jail, until 2000.

The building was listed on the National Register of Historic Places in 1979, at which time it was vacant.

== See also ==
- National Register of Historic Places listings in Bradley County, Arkansas
