= List of Louisiana–Monroe Warhawks in the NFL draft =

This is a list of Louisiana–Monroe Warhawks football players in the NFL draft.

== Key ==
B	Back	K	Kicker	NT	Nose tackle
C	Center	LB	Linebacker	FB	Fullback
DB	Defensive back	P	Punter	HB	Halfback
DE	Defensive end	QB	Quarterback	WR	Wide receiver
DT	Defensive tackle	RB	Running back	G	Guard
E	End	T	Offensive tackle	TE	Tight end

== Selections ==
Year	Round	Pick	Overall	Player	Team	Position
1961	8	3	101	Charley Barnes	Washington Redskins	E
1961	19	3	147	Charley Barnes	Buffalo Bills	E
1963	21	5	165	Ross Nolan	Denver Broncos	E
1967	14	13	354	Dalton Leblanc	San Francisco 49ers	WR
1968	14	13	367	Vic Bender	St. Louis Cardinals	OL
1971	1	7	7	Joe Profit	Atlanta Falcons	RB
1971	6	26	156	Ken Frith	Baltimore Colts	DT
1972	12	14	300	Don Zimmerman	Philadelphia Eagles	WR
1974	16	1	391	Matthew Williams	Houston Oilers	RB
1975	11	6	266	Danny Lee	New Orleans Saints	P
1976	13	14	361	Joe Bruner	Kansas City Chiefs	QB
1976	5	18	142	Fred Coleman	Buffalo Bills	TE
1979	4	22	104	John Floyd	San Diego Chargers	WR
1980	12	12	317	David Dumars	New York Jets	DB
1980	8	11	204	Vic Minor	Seattle Seahawks	DB
1981	5	15	126	Ken Poole	Miami Dolphins	DE
1982	9	19	242	Bob Lane	Tampa Bay Buccaneers	QB
1983	10	24	275	Roosevelt Straughter	Pittsburgh Steelers	DB
1984	8	23	219	Bob Craighead	San Diego Chargers	RB
1985	8	19	215	Ronnie Washington	Atlanta Falcons	LB
1986	3	12	67	Bubby Brister	Pittsburgh Steelers	QB
1987	5	26	138	Will Johnson	Chicago Bears	DE
1988	6	22	159	Stan Humphries	Washington Redskins	QB
1988	4	18	100	Teddy Garcia	New England Patriots	K
1990	4	21	102	Jackie Harris	Green Bay Packers	TE
1993	8	12	208	Greg Robinson	Los Angeles Raiders	RB
1993	8	1	197	Jeff Blackshear	Seattle Seahawks	G
1993	2	27	56	Vincent Brisby	New England Patriots	WR
1993	2	20	49	Roosevelt Potts	Indianapolis Colts	RB
1994	4	7	110	Larry Whigham	Seattle Seahawks	DB
1994	2	23	52	James Folston	Los Angeles Raiders	DE
1995	2	4	36	Shawn King	Carolina Panthers	DE
1996	3	33	94	Stepfret Williams	Dallas Cowboys	WR
1998	3	14	75	Steve Foley	Cincinnati Bengals	LB
1999	6	7	176	Lionel Barnes	St. Louis Rams	DE
1999	3	17	78	Marty Booker	Chicago Bears	WR
2000	5	33	162	Pat Dennis	Kansas City Chiefs	DB
2005	6	7	181	Chris Harris	Chicago Bears	DB
2007	5	30	167	Kevin Payne	Chicago Bears	DB
2016	5	36	173	Trey Caldwell	Cleveland Browns	DB
2019	6	30	203	Marcus Green	Atlanta Falcons	WR
