= Warren Post Office =

- U.S. National Register of Historic Places
- U.S. Historic district – Contributing property
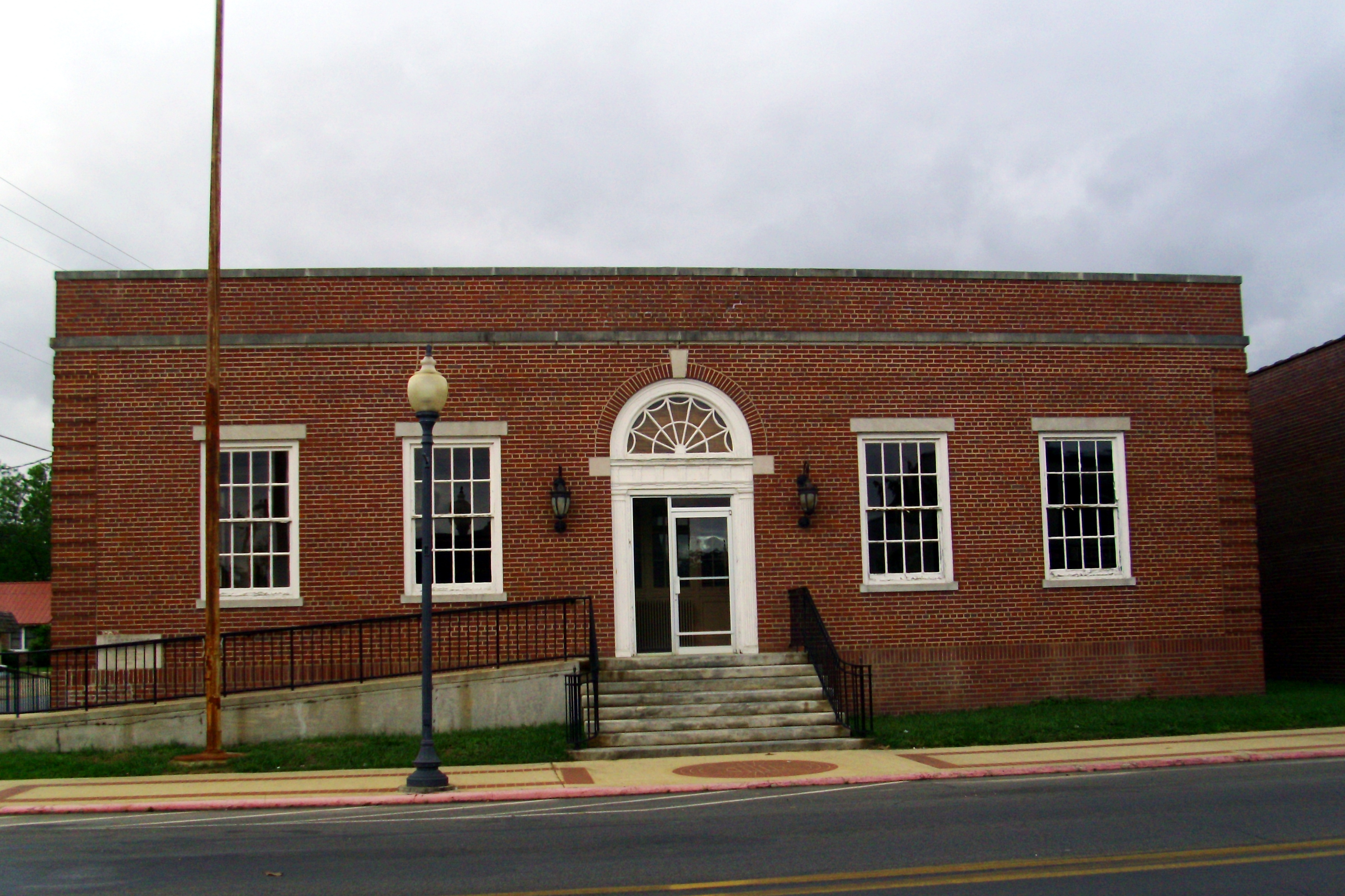

- Location within Arkansas Location within the United States
- Location: 236 S. Main St. (US 63B), Warren, Arkansas
- Coordinates: 33°36′45″N 92°3′53″W
- Area: less than one acre
- Built: 1935
- Architect: Louis A. Simon, Barnes Building
- Architectural style: Colonial Revival
- Part of: Warren Commercial Historic District (ID16000433)
- NRHP reference No.: 03001460

Significant dates
- Added to NRHP: January 21, 2004
- Designated CP: July 11, 2016

The old Warren Post Office is a Colonial Revival structure at 236 South Main Street in Warren, Arkansas. The single-story brick building was built in 1935–6, and was used by as a post office until 1998. It was purchased by the city of Warren and repurposed for city offices. Its exterior remains largely unchanged from the time of its construction, the major alterations being the replacement of the entrance doors and the addition of a handicapped access ramp.

The building was listed on the National Register of Historic Places in 2004.

== See also ==
- National Register of Historic Places listings in Bradley County, Arkansas
- List of United States post offices
