= New Zion AME Zion Church =

Historic church in Arkansas, United States

- U.S. National Register of Historic Places
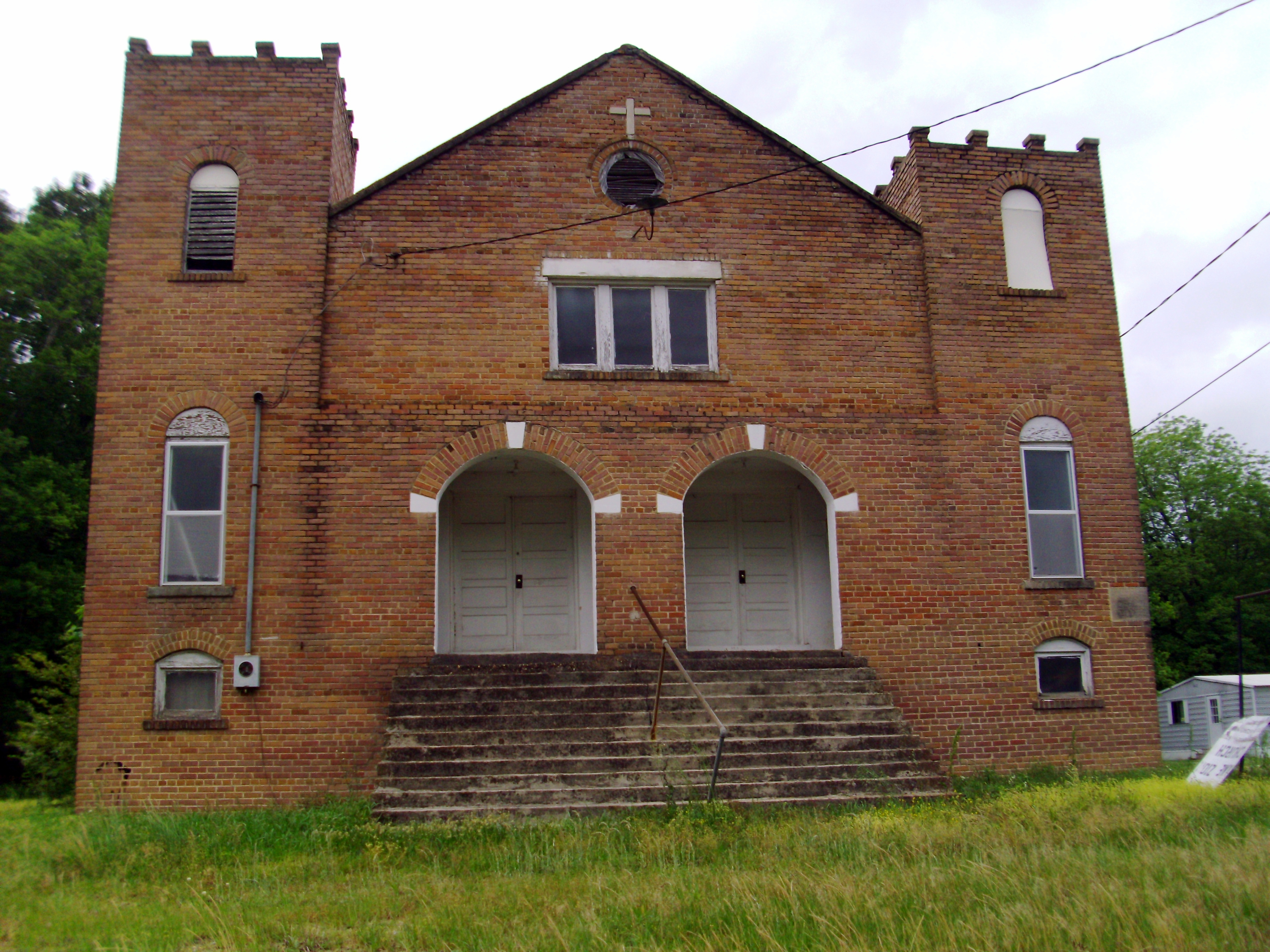

- Location within Arkansas Location within the United States
- Location: Jct. of Myrtle and Neely Sts., Warren, Arkansas
- Coordinates: 33°37′33″N 92°4′5″W
- Area: less than one acre
- Built: 1927
- Architectural style: Greek Revival, Romanesque
- NRHP reference No.: 00000628
- Added to NRHP: June 9, 2000

New Zion AME Zion Church is a historic African Methodist church at the junction of Myrtle and Neely Streets in Warren, Arkansas. Built in 1927, it has a vernacular styling that includes Gothic and Romanesque Revival details, included castellated towers with parapet, and an arched entryway. Its interior fixtures, including pews, chancel railing, and beadboard tray ceiling, are in original condition, but the windows have been modernized.

The church was listed on the National Register of Historic Places in 2000.

== See also ==
- National Register of Historic Places listings in Bradley County, Arkansas
