= Ingalls, Arkansas =

Community in Arkansas, US

Coordinates: 33°23′00″N 92°09′03″W

Ingalls is a small community located in Bradley County, Arkansas, United States. It is about 5 miles south of Hermitage.

== History ==
During the 1800s, the economy in Ingalls was primarily agricultural, with the principal crop being corn. Other crops were also grown such as grain, beans, squash, turnips, and other vegetables. There was also some production of beef and pork.

The Fordyce Lumber Co. was established in 1892. The Crossett Lumber Company was established in 1899. Both companies were owned by the same people. Both companies were involved in the production and processing of lumber and other wood products.

In 1906 & 1907, The Chicago, Rock Island, and Pacific Railroad (CRI&PR) was built to move lumber and other wood products between the Fordyce Lumber Co. and the Crossett Lumber Company. The CRI&PR passed through Ingalls, as well as several other communities, including Hermitage, Banks, and others. The railroad played a significant role in the development of Ingalls and the surrounding region, and helped to drive economic growth in the area.

The CRI&PR was built through Ingalls in 1906, and the Rock Island Townsite Company established the community at its current location in 1907. The railroad moved goods and people to and from the area, and played a significant role in the development of Ingalls and the surrounding region.

The management of the Chicago, Rock Island, and Pacific Railroad (CRI&PR) insisted that Ingalls change its name from Crowtown to Ingalls, in honor of Kansas Senator John James Ingalls. The name change took place when the CRI&PR was built through Ingalls in 1906, and the Rock Island Townsite Company established the community at its current location in 1907.

In the 1900s to 1960s, there were several general merchandise stores, businesses, and facilities in Ingalls. The first businesses included those by W. L. Calloway, D. W. Clanton, J. W. Garrison, N. B. York and Son, Dr. M. T. Crow (General Mercantile), J. W. Garrison, and H. W. Calloway. There was a store and sawmill there owned by Harrod and Jackson. Later, there was a sawmill, cotton gin, telephone office. The Ingalls School and Methodist Church shared a building. There was party line telephone service available through the telephone office owned and operated by Mr. and Mrs. Brooks. Dial telephone service became available in the early 1960s and the Ingalls telephone office was closed.
