= Vick, Arkansas =

Unincorporated community in Arkansas, US

Coordinates: 33°19′43″N 92°06′20″W

Vick is an unincorporated community in Bradley County, Arkansas, United States, near Hermitage. It is situated at 148 feet (45 meters) above mean sea level.

== Education ==
The area was formerly within the Vick Consolidated School District No. 21.

As of 2021 it is in the Hermitage School District.

== History, 1800s ==
A post office for Blanchton, Arkansas (Godfrey's Landing near the Saline River) was established in Samuel Godfry's house in 1882 until 1895.

Blanchton, Johnsville, and Sumpter had post offices during 1885; Hermitage mail was delivered to Adamsville (south of Warren); Ingalls, Vick and Board were not listed in the 1885 edition of the Rand McNally Atlas.

== History, 1900s ==
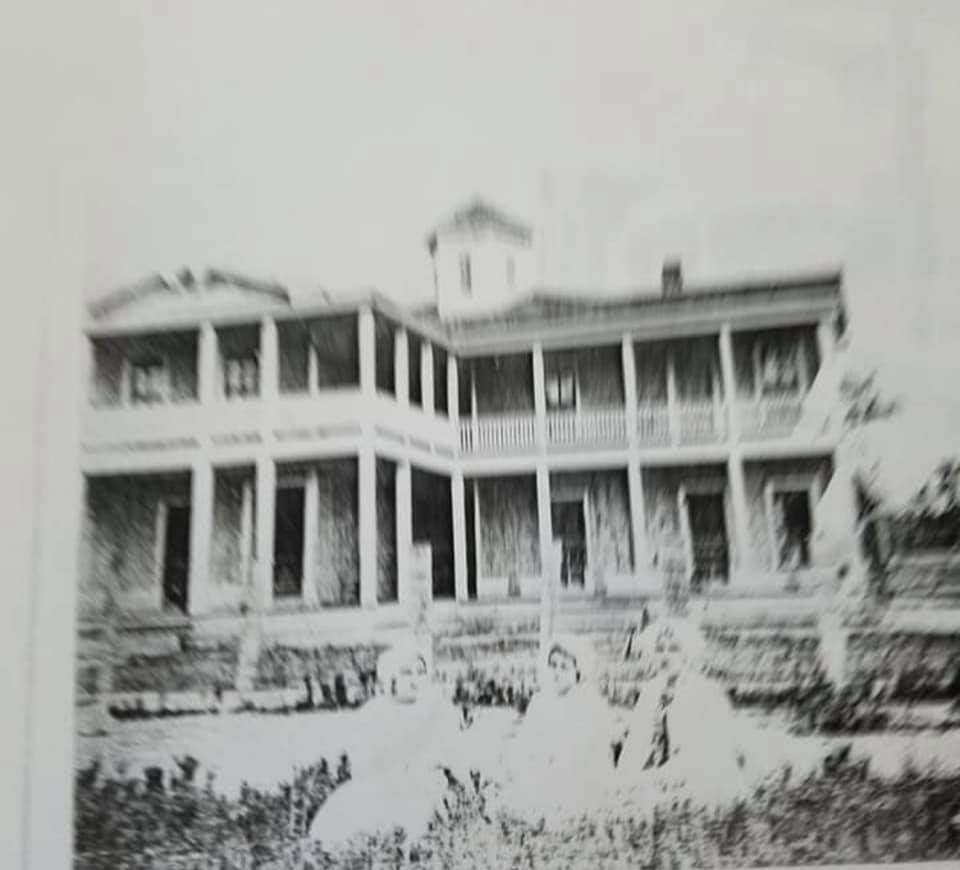
W. T. Ferrell hotel in Vick Arkansas

Vick was a fairly large town in the 1930s. In June, 1906, the Rock Island Railroad was built thru Ingalls and Vick. The railroad established Ingalls at a railroad track distance of 8.2 km (5.1 mi) south of the Hermitage. The railroad thought having stops that were less than 5 miles apart was too close for the two towns to flourish. The railroad stop at Vick was 7.5 km (4.7 mi) by railroad track distance south of the Ingalls train depot station.

Large quantities of wood was loaded onto trains at Vick. The cutting of timber was the main source of income in the area.

W. T. Ferrell had a hotel in Vick that burned down in the 1930s. Some of the lumbermen working on the timber harvest slept in the Vick hotel.

Eventually the demand and supply of timber tapered off and the town slowly disappeared. The hotel burned down in the 1930s. There are no buildings remaining today, but there still is a sign labeled "Vick" and the railroad tracks still goes through the area.
