= Jeff Wardlaw =

American politician

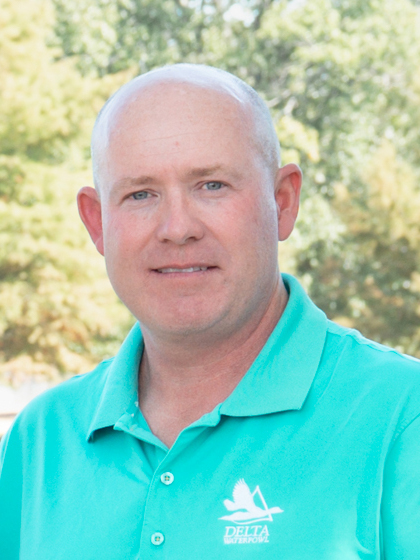
- Wardlaw in 2025

Member of the Arkansas House of Representatives from the 94th district
- Incumbent
- Assumed office January 1, 2011
- Preceded by: Gregg Reep
- Succeeded by: John Kyle Day (elect)

Personal details
- Born: August 25, 1980 (age 46) Pine Bluff, Arkansas, US
- Party: Democratic (before 2016); Republican (2016–present)
- Spouse: Laura Wardlaw
- Children: 6
- Education: University of Arkansas at Monticello
- Occupation: Farmer
- Website: www.jeffwardlaw.com

Jeffrey Reed Wardlaw (born August 25, 1980) is a farmer from Hermitage in Bradley County in south Arkansas who is a Republican member of the Arkansas House of Representatives for District 94, which he has represented since 2011. His district includes a portion of Bradley County, Drew County, Desha County counties.

== Background ==
Wardlaw graduated from Hermitage High School in Hermitage in Bradley County and then the University of Arkansas at Monticello, at which he earned a Bachelor of Science degree in agriculture. He enjoys hunting and fishing and is a member of the Rotary Club.

== Career ==
Wardlaw owns and operates Wardlaw Brothers Farms, Inc., in Hermitage. He is a former vice chairman of the bipartisan Freshman Caucus, and received the "Legislator of the Year" award from the Arkansas Forestry Association. He is a member of the Public Health Committee and the Insurance and Commerce Committee, of which he is chairman of the Insurance Subcommittee. Wardlaw is a member of the Bradley County Chamber of Commerce board of directors and Bradley County Industrial Development Commission. Wardlaw had been mentioned as a potential Democratic candidate for Arkansas's 4th congressional district seat vacated in 2015 by since freshman U.S. Senator Tom Cotton. However, Wardlaw instead ran without opposition for a fourth term in the state House in 2016, but he switched parties a week after the general election. Wardlaw's fellow representative Mike Holcomb of Jefferson County, who, like Wardlaw, represents Cleveland County, had switched from the Democratic to the Republican Party three months earlier, in August 2016. Like Wardlaw, he too cited differences with the party on social issues as a main factor in his decision.
