= John Kyle Day =

American politician

Member-elect of the Arkansas House of Representatives from the 94th district
- Assuming office January 2027
- Succeeding: Jeff Wardlaw

Personal details
- Born: September 25, 1973 (age 53) Fayetteville, Arkansas
- Party: Republican
- Website: drjohnkyleday.org

John Kyle Day (born September 25, 1973) is an American politician. A member of the Republican Party, he is the member-elect for the 94th district of the Arkansas House of Representatives. He was elected in the 2026 election. He supports term limits.
