= Adams-Leslie House =

Historic house in Arkansas, United States

- U.S. National Register of Historic Places
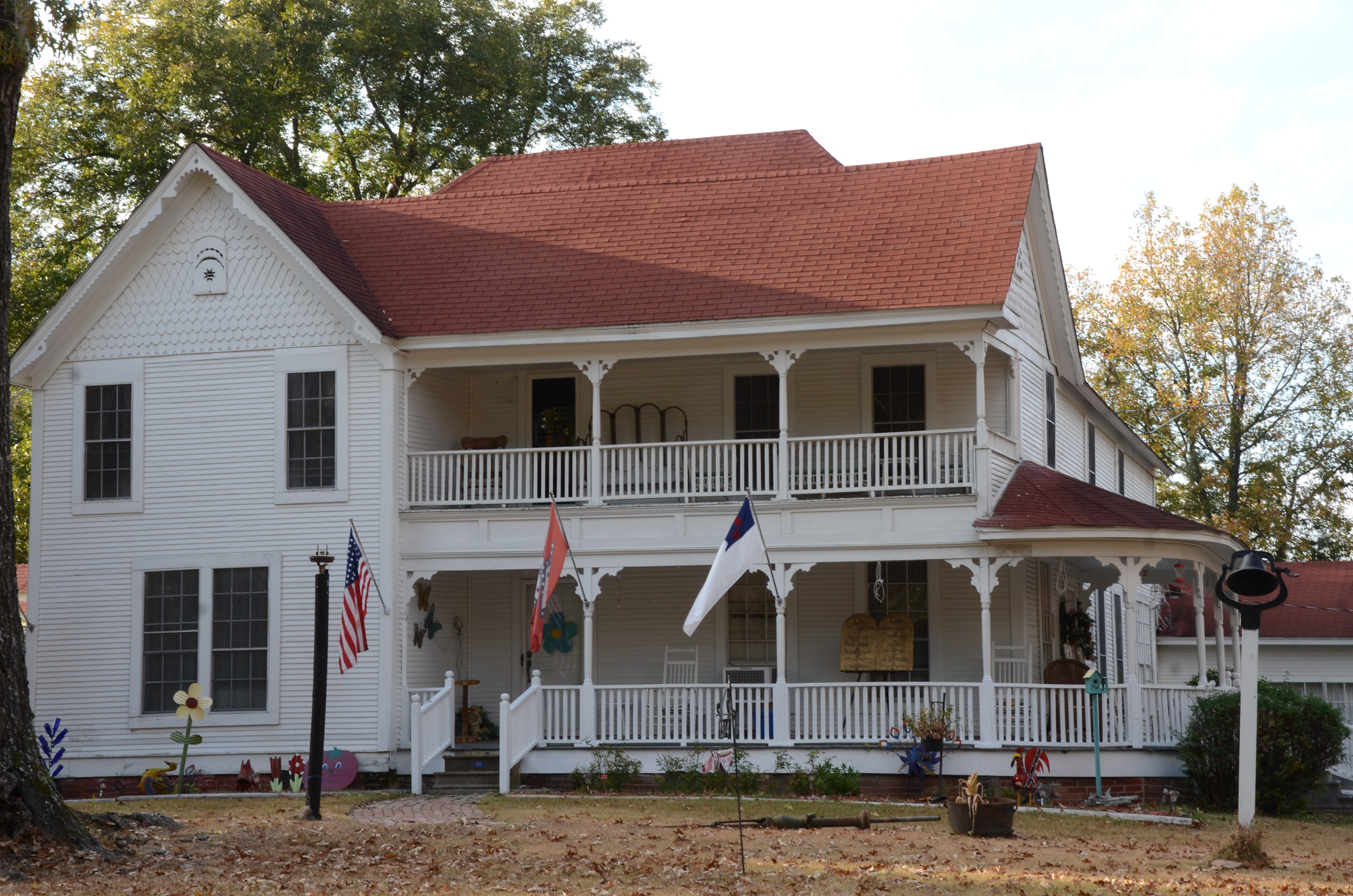

- Location within Arkansas Location within the United States
- Location: Route 1, Box 81, Warren, Arkansas
- Coordinates: 33°31′14″N 92°5′41″W
- Area: 1 acre (0.40 ha)
- Built: 1903
- Architect: Thomas L. Brown
- NRHP reference No.: 79000433
- Added to NRHP: August 9, 1979

The Adams-Leslie House is a historic house located in rural Bradley County, Arkansas, near Warren.

== Description and history ==
The two-story, timber-framed house was built in 1903 by William James Leslie and his father-in-law, Julius Henry Adams, and is the only historic house remaining in the Sand Tuck-Hickory Springs part of the county. It was designed by Thomas L. Brown in a vernacular late Victorian style, with pilastered corner boards and gable ends decorated with vergeboard and alternating fish-scale and diamond shingles.

The house was listed on the National Register of Historic Places on August 9, 1979.

== See also ==
- National Register of Historic Places listings in Bradley County, Arkansas
