= Mt. Olive Rosenwald School =

- U.S. National Register of Historic Places
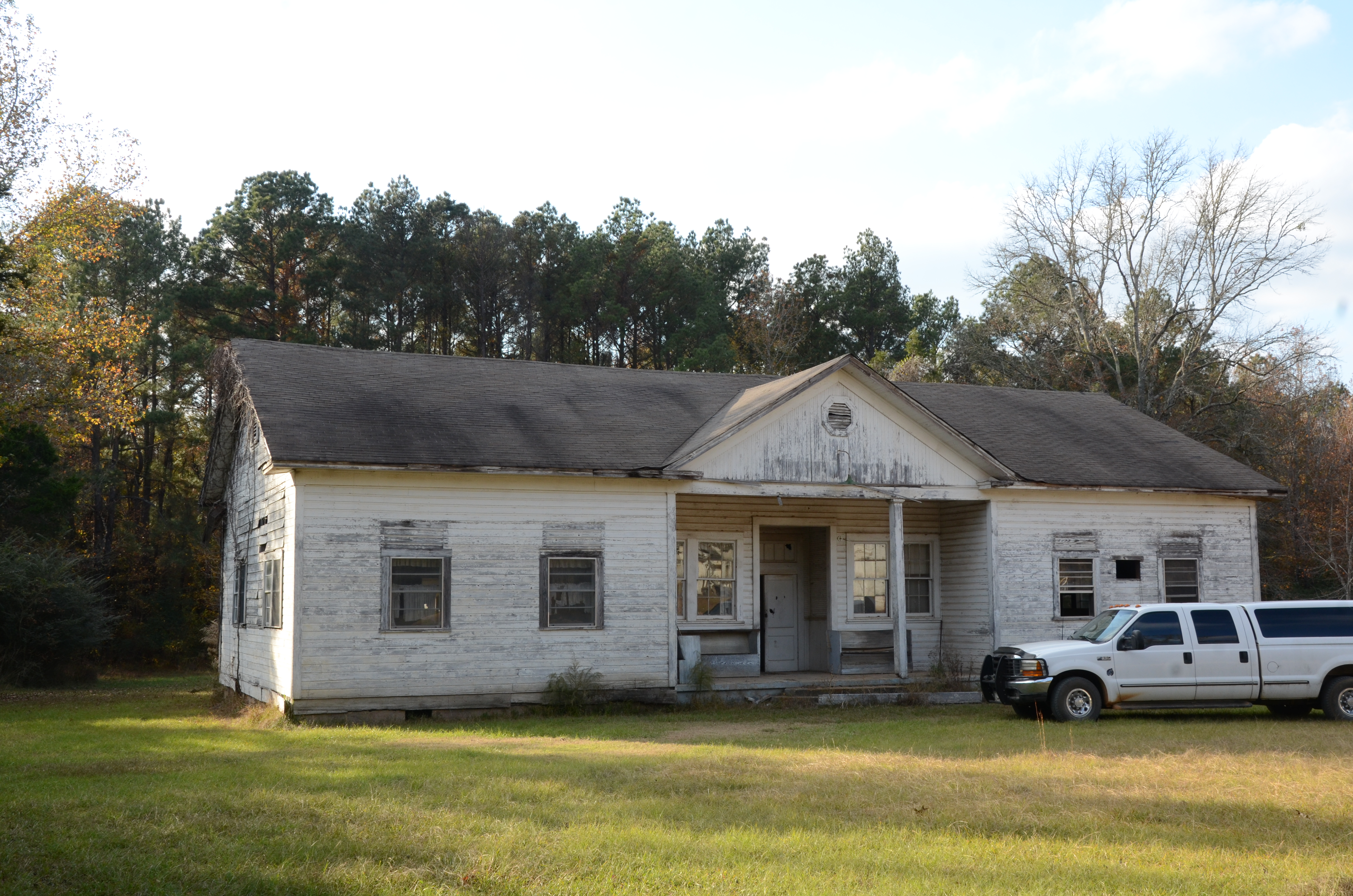

- Location within Arkansas Location within the United States
- Location: Bradley Rd. 45, Mt. Olive, Arkansas
- Coordinates: 33°25′42″N 92°03′34″W
- Area: 3.2 acres (1.3 ha)
- Built: 1927
- Architectural style: Colonial Revival
- NRHP reference No.: 03001454
- Added to NRHP: January 21, 2004

The Mt. Olive Rosenwald School, on Bradley Rd. 45 in Mt. Olive, Bradley County, Arkansas is a wood frame Colonial Revival schoolhouse built in 1927. It is one of five buildings in the county that was funded by The Rosenwald Fund, established by philanthropist Julius Rosenwald to further the education of rural African Americans. It is not known when the building ceased to be used as a school, but classes were offered as late as 1949.

The building is a basic T shape, with a center entry, classrooms on either side of the entry, and an auditorium in the rear.

The building was listed on the National Register of Historic Places in 2004.

== See also ==
- National Register of Historic Places listings in Bradley County, Arkansas
