= Warren Brick Streets =

- U.S. National Register of Historic Places
- U.S. Historic district – Contributing property
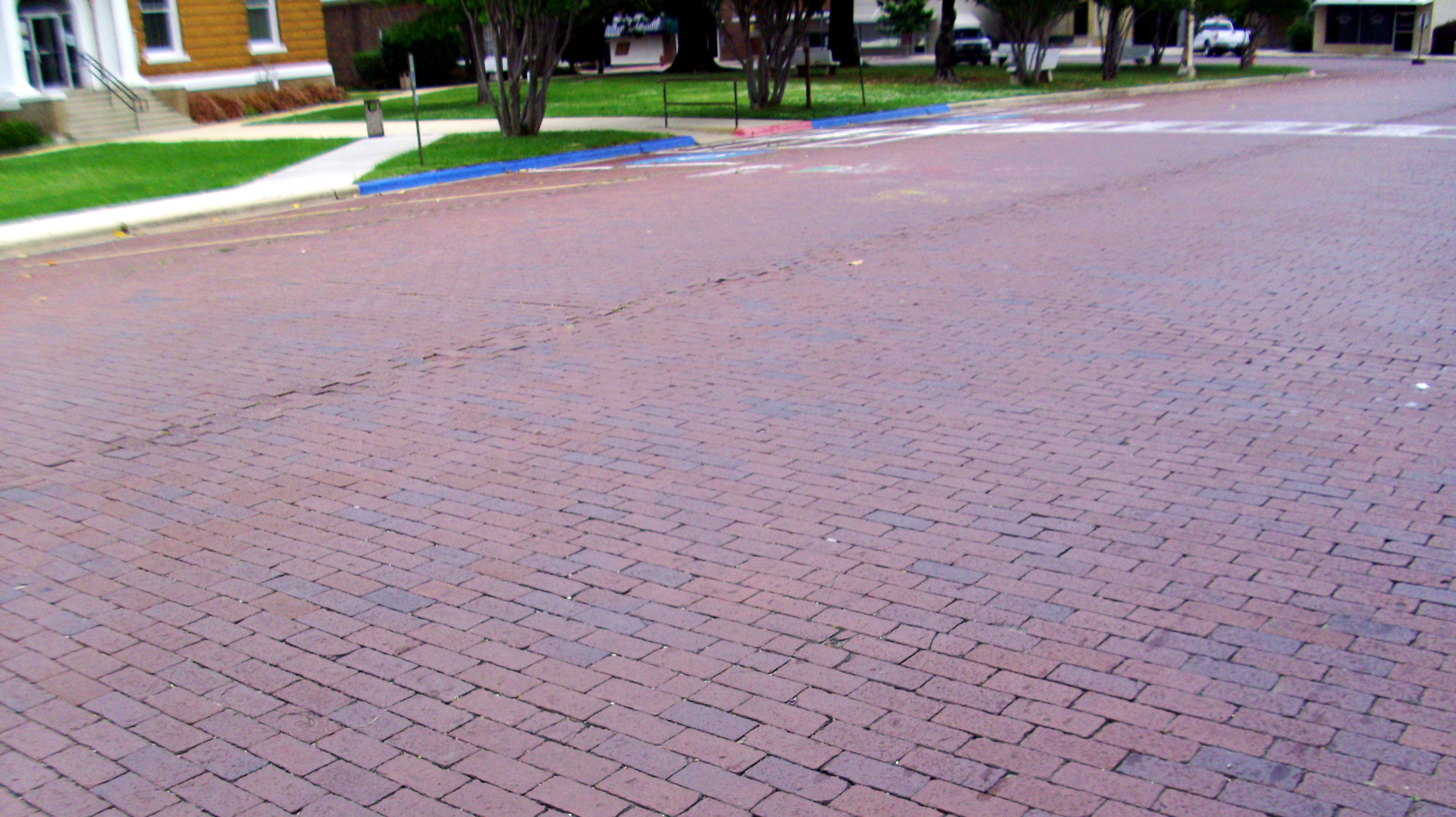

- Location within Arkansas Location within the United States
- Location: Portions of Cedar, Myrtle, Chestnut, 1st, Walnut, Elm and Cypress Sts., Warren, Arkansas
- Coordinates: 33°36′52″N 92°3′45″W
- Area: 4.5 acres (1.8 ha)
- Built: 1927
- Part of: Warren Commercial Historic District (ID16000433)
- MPS: Arkansas Highway History and Architecture MPS
- NRHP reference No.: 06001277

Significant dates
- Added to NRHP: January 24, 2007
- Designated CP: July 11, 2016

The Warren Brick Streets of Warren, Arkansas are a collection of city streets that have retained original brick pavement laid down in the late 1920s. The sections include blocks of Cedar, Myrtle, Chestnut, 1st, Walnut, Elm, and Cypress Streets, and include nearly 5,000 feet (1,500 m) of pavement. The bricks are laid out in a running bond pattern up to intersections, where a diamond pattern is used, partly to maintain the position of the bricks. The bricks measure 4 by 8.5 inches, and are probably 2 inches thick. The streets are 36 feet (11 m) wide, with 2 feet of concrete gutter and curbing. It is surmised that the bricks were laid on a concrete substrate, in part because the condition of the surviving sections is very good.

The street sections were listed on the National Register of Historic Places in 2007.

== See also ==
- National Register of Historic Places listings in Bradley County, Arkansas
