= Bailey House (Warren, Arkansas) =

Historic house in Arkansas, United States

- U.S. National Register of Historic Places
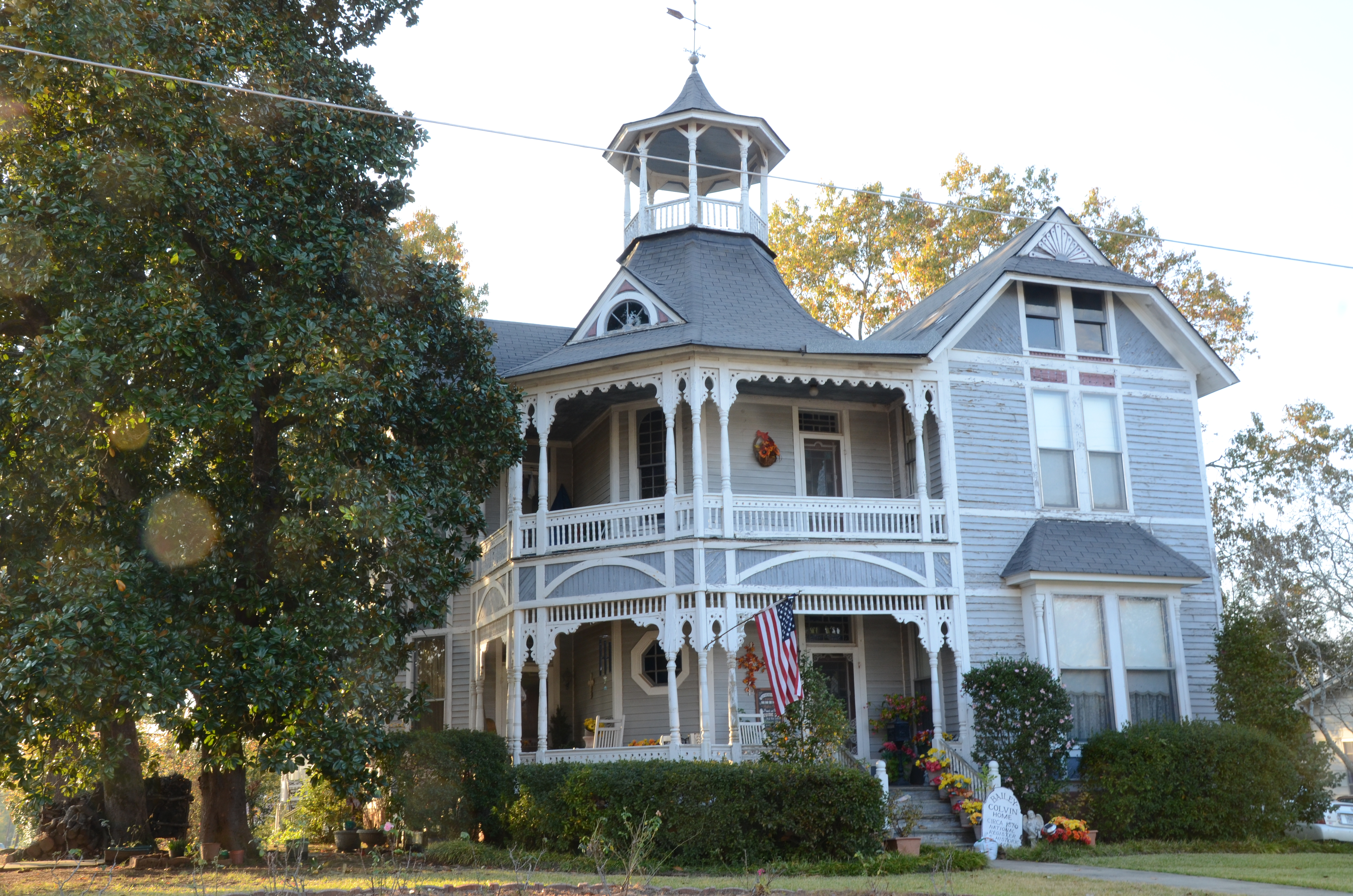

- Location within Arkansas Location within the United States
- Location: 302 Chestnut St., Warren, Arkansas
- Coordinates: 33°36′57″N 92°3′43″W
- Area: less than one acre
- Built: 1900
- NRHP reference No.: 75000375
- Added to NRHP: August 28, 1975

The Bailey House is a historic house at 302 Chestnut Street in Warren, Arkansas. The 2 1/2 story Victorian house is one of the most elaborately styled houses in Bradley County. It was built around the turn of the 20th century by James Monroe Bailey, an American Civil War veteran and a local druggist. The house he built originally occupied (along with all of its outbuildings) an entire city block near the Bradley County Courthouse; the estate has since been reduced to just the house. Its dominant features are an octagonal cupola and a two-story porch with delicate turned balusters and bargeboard decoration.

The house was listed on the National Register of Historic Places in 1975.

== See also ==
- National Register of Historic Places listings in Bradley County, Arkansas
