= Davis-Adams House =

Historic house in Arkansas, United States

- Davis–Adams House
- U.S. National Register of Historic Places
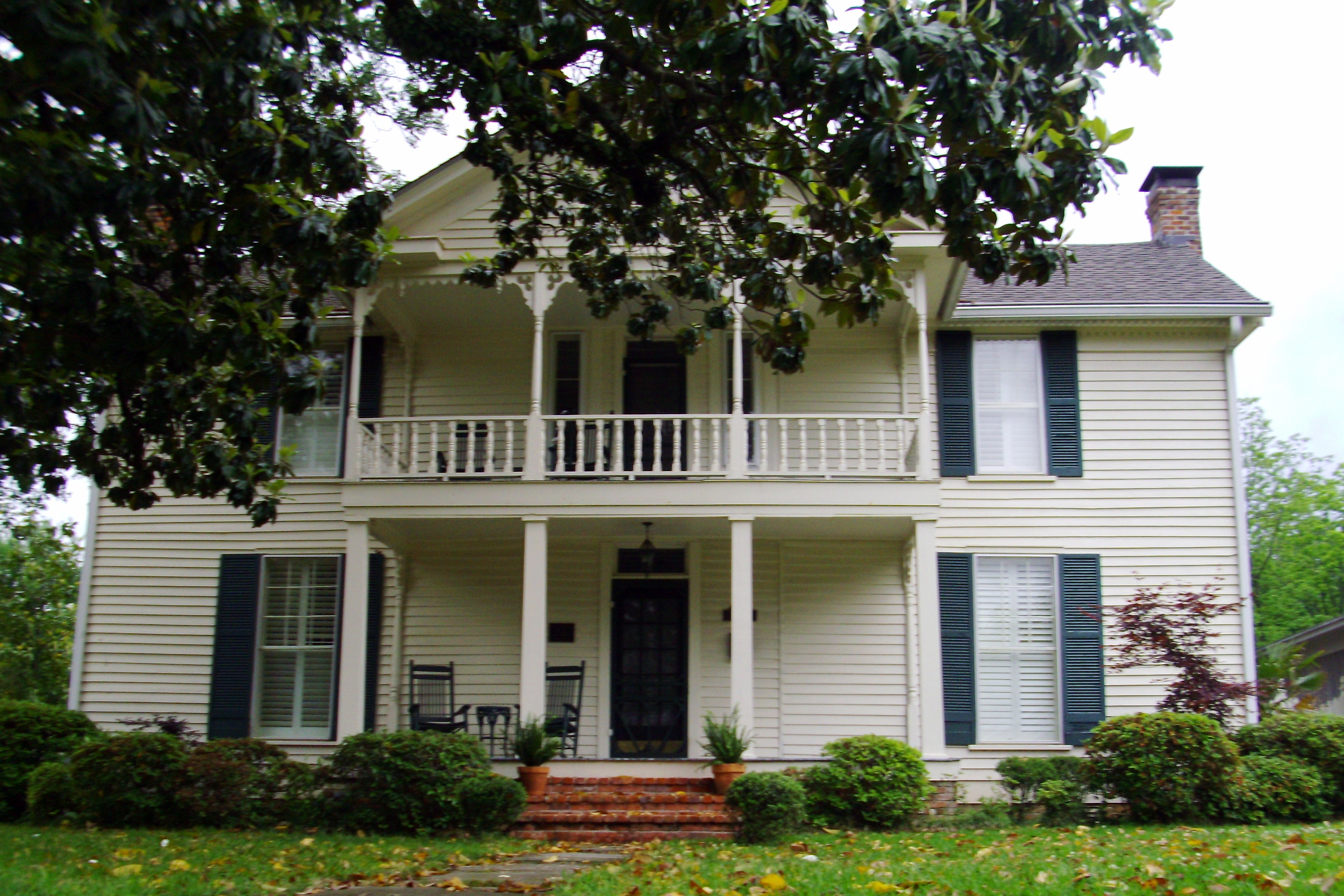

- Location within Arkansas Location within the United States
- Location: 509 N. Myrtle St., Warren, Arkansas
- Coordinates: 33°37′8″N 92°3′49″W
- Area: less than one acre
- Built: 1860
- Architectural style: I-house
- NRHP reference No.: 99000224
- Added to NRHP: February 18, 1999

The Davis-Adams House is a historic house at 509 North Myrtle Street in Warren, Arkansas. It was built c. 1860 in a Plain Traditional style, but received a significant Victorian facelift in the 1890s, when its two-story porch was decorated with spindled balusters and jigsawed details. This work was probably done for its first documented owner, Dr. S.M. Davis, who bought the house in 1888. His daughter, Zena Davis Adams, who married a man with interests in a local grocery store, occupied the house her entire life.

The house was listed on the National Register of Historic Places in 1999.

== See also ==
- National Register of Historic Places listings in Bradley County, Arkansas
