= Dr. John Wilson Martin House =

Historic house in Arkansas, United States

- U.S. National Register of Historic Places
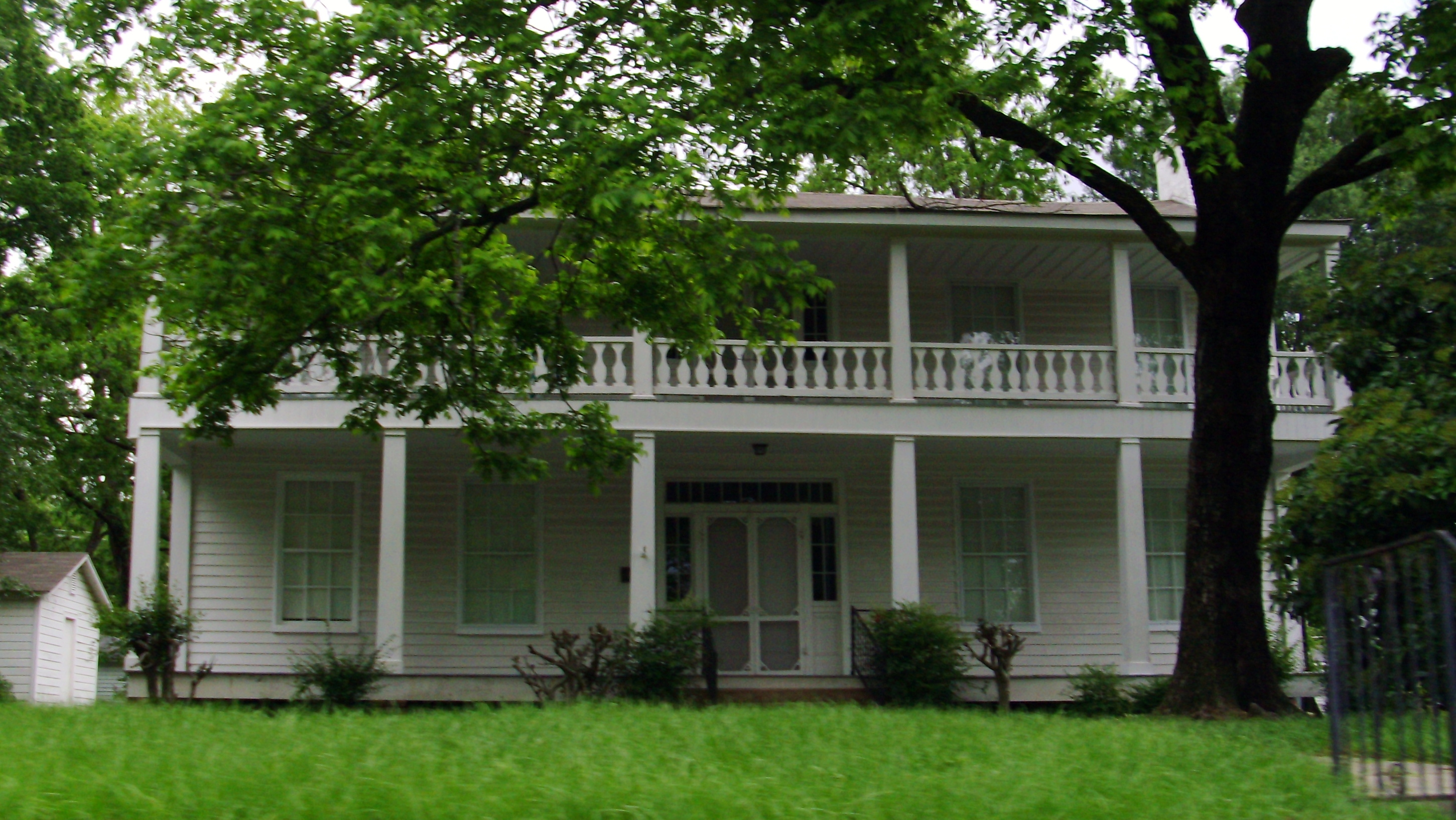

- Location within Arkansas Location within the United States
- Location: 200 Ash St., Warren, Arkansas
- Coordinates: 33°37′0″N 92°4′4″W
- Area: less than one acre
- Architectural style: Greek Revival, Stick/eastlake, Queen Anne
- NRHP reference No.: 90001948
- Added to NRHP: December 27, 1990

The Dr. John Wilson Martin House is a historic house at 200 Ash Street in Warren, Arkansas. In addition to being a well-preserved specimen of an antebellum Greek Revival farmhouse, it is believed to be the oldest surviving residence in Warren. It was built for John Wilson Martin, one of the first doctors in Warren County. Its construction date is uncertain, but local tradition places its start in 1860, and its completion after the American Civil War. The two story porch and doorway with transom and sidelights are typical of the vernacular Greek Revival structures built in the area. Although it received some Folk Victorian modifications in the early 20th, it has retained its basic Greek Revival character.

The house was listed on the National Register of Historic Places in 1990. It now houses the Bradley County Historical Museum.

== See also ==
- National Register of Historic Places listings in Bradley County, Arkansas
