= Hermitage School District (Arkansas) =

School district in Arkansas, United States

Address
- 310 North School Drive Hermitage, Arkansas, 71647; United States

District information
- Type: Public
- Grades: PreK–12
- NCES District ID: 0507710

Students and staff
- Students: 461
- Teachers: 38.74
- Staff: 53.1
- Student–teacher ratio: 11.9

Other information
- Website: www.hermitageschools.org

Hermitage School District 12 is a school district in Bradley County, Arkansas, serving Hermitage. Its schools are Hermitage Elementary School and Hermitage High School.

It includes the unincorporated area of Vick.
