= St. Luke's Catholic Church (Warren, Arkansas) =

Historic church in Arkansas, United States

- U.S. National Register of Historic Places
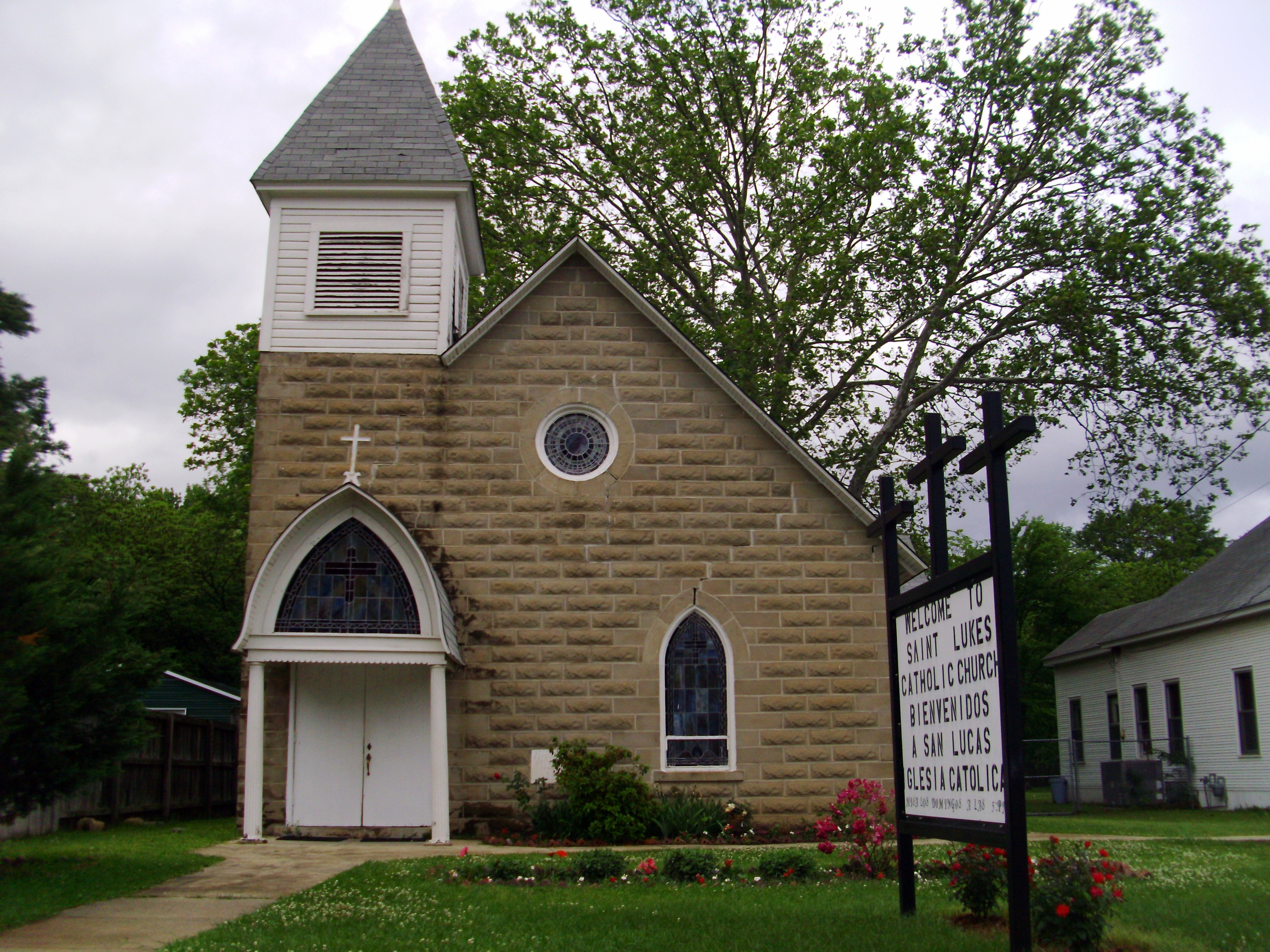

- Location within Arkansas Location within the United States
- Location: 508 W. Pine, Warren, Arkansas
- Coordinates: 33.6177°N 92.07293°W
- Area: less than one acre
- Built: 1907
- Architectural style: Gothic Revival
- NRHP reference No.: 98000581
- Added to NRHP: May 29, 1998

St. Luke's Catholic Church is a historic Roman Catholic church at 508 W. Pine in Warren, Arkansas. It is attended from Holy Redeemer Church in El Dorado, in the Diocese of Little Rock.

The historic structure was built in 1907, following a simple L-shaped plan with Gothic Revival styling. The exterior is concrete blocks that have been treated to look like ashlar stone. It was originally built for the Episcopal Diocese of Arkansas and called St. Mary's Church, but it never had a large congregation, and services ended in the late 1920s. It was vacant until its purchase in 1948 by the Catholic Church, which named it St. Luke's.

The church was listed on the National Register of Historic Places in 1998.

== See also ==
- National Register of Historic Places listings in Bradley County, Arkansas
