= Wilson-Martin House =

Historic house in Arkansas, United States

- U.S. National Register of Historic Places
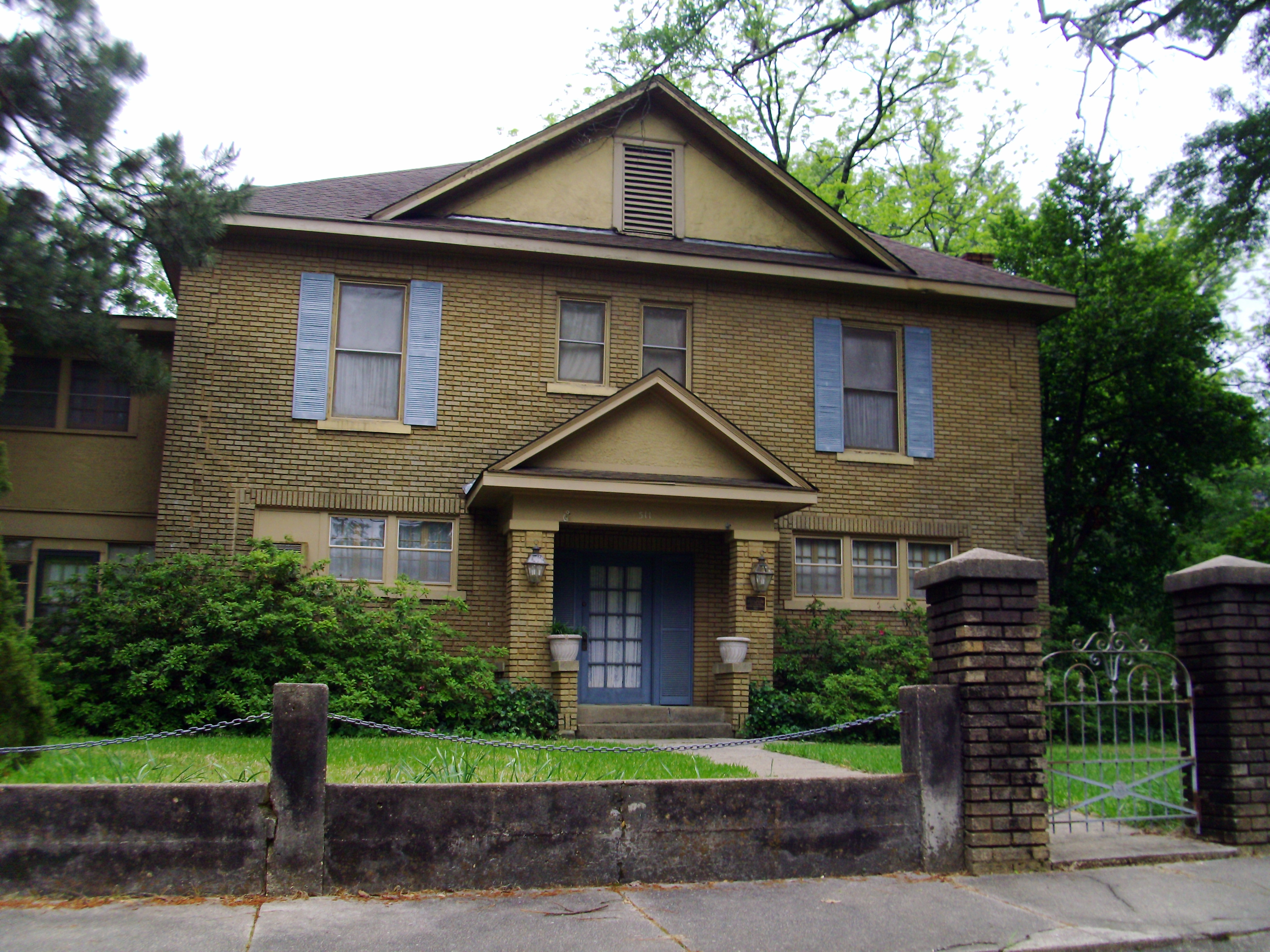

- Location within Arkansas Location within the United States
- Location: 511 Bond St., Warren, Arkansas
- Coordinates: 33°37′13″N 92°3′57″W
- Area: less than one acre
- Built: 1916
- Architectural style: Colonial Revival
- NRHP reference No.: 06000827
- Added to NRHP: September 20, 2006

The Wilson-Martin House is a historic house at 511 Bond Street in Warren, Arkansas. The two story brick house was built in 1916, and is an excellent local example of Georgian Revival styling, despite later alterations. The house was built by John Rufus Wilson, a lawyer, teacher, and state legislator, and was sold by the Wilsons to Bryan Martin, a local merchant, in 1930. The house has elegant Georgian features, including a hip roof, brick corner quoins, and a projecting front entry porch with triangular pediment. The entrance is flanked on both sides by three casement Prairie-style windows. The second floor of the front has a pair of small windows above the entry porch, and flanking sash windows on either side.

The house originally had single-story porches on three sides, but those on the east and south sides have been enclosed and topped by a second floor chamber. Other alterations have been made to the interior of the house, but it has retained much of its original material, including the porch supports for the enclosed porches.

The property also includes original landscape elements. A poured concrete base wall lines the north and west property lines, with brick anchor posts. The sidewalk and driveway entrance have iron gates mounted on brick gate posts.

The house was listed on the National Register of Historic Places in 2006.

== See also ==
- National Register of Historic Places listings in Bradley County, Arkansas
