= Warren Commercial Historic District (Warren, Arkansas) =

Historic district in Arkansas, United States

- U.S. National Register of Historic Places
- U.S. Historic district
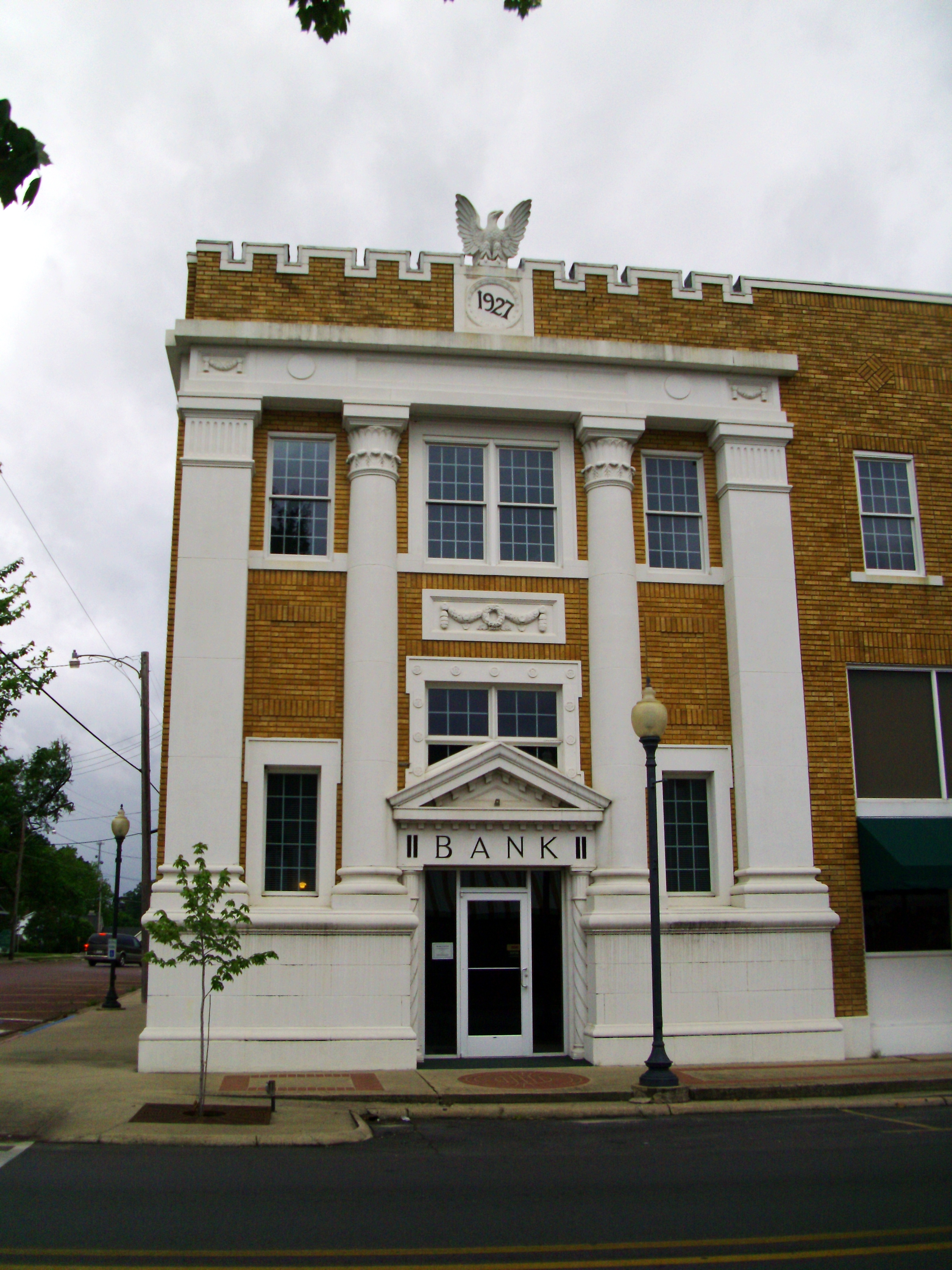
- Warren Bank building

- Location within Arkansas Location within the United States
- Location: Roughly bounded by Alabama, Elm, Chestnut, 2nd, Church, Main & Howard Sts., Warren, Arkansas
- Coordinates: 33°36′46″N 92°3′52″W
- Area: 20 acres (8.1 ha)
- Built: 1890
- Architectural style: Early Commercial; Beaux Arts; Classical Revival
- NRHP reference No.: 16000433
- Added to NRHP: July 11, 2016

The Warren Commercial Historic District encompasses the historic commercial heart of Warren, Arkansas. The district's northern end is focused on the Bradley County Courthouse and Clerk's Office, and extends down Main Street to Church Street, with branches along cross streets and roads radiating from the courthouse square. This area was developed beginning in the 1840s, but its oldest buildings date to the 1890s, primarily brick commercial buildings. Of architectural note are the courthouse, a Beaux Arts structure built in 1903, and the Classical Revival Warren Bank building (1927).

The district was listed on the National Register of Historic Places in 2016. Buildings individually listed in the district include the courthouse, post office, and the Art Moderne Blankinship Motor Company Building. Some of Warren's early brick streets are also found in the district.

== See also ==
- National Register of Historic Places listings in Bradley County, Arkansas
