= Mount Olive, Bradley County, Arkansas =

Mount Olive, Arkansas
- Unincorporated community
- Location within Arkansas Location within the United States
- Coordinates: 33°25′44″N 92°03′32″W
- Country: United States
- State: Arkansas
- County: Bradley
- Elevation: 197 ft (60 m)
- Time zone: UTC-6 (Central (CST))
  - Summer (DST): UTC-5 (CDT)
- Area code: 870
- GNIS feature ID: 57129

Mount Olive is an unincorporated community in Bradley County, Arkansas, United States. It is the location of (or is the nearest community to) Mt. Olive Rosenwald School, which is located on Bradley Rd. 45 and is listed on the National Register of Historic Places. Goepel was previously the name used for Mount Olive.

In 1910, the Warren, Johnsville and Saline River Railroad opened a tap line railroad to Goepel (Mt. Olive) in 1910. The branch to Mount Olive was abandoned before 1985.

Jerry Wayne Ross of Mount Olive was killed in action on 1966-09-26 in the Vietnam War.
