= Charley Barnes =

American football player (born 1939)

No. 82, 87
- Position: End

Personal information
- Born: October 6, 1937; Eudora, Arkansas, U.S.
- Died: October 20, 2005 (aged 68); Ormond Beach, Florida, U.S.
- Listed height: 6 ft 5 in (1.96 m)
- Listed weight: 230 lb (104 kg)

Career information
- High school: Eudora (AR)
- College: Northeast Louisiana State
- NFL draft: 1961: 8th round, 101st overall pick
- AFL draft: 1961: 19th round, 148th overall pick

Career history
- Washington Redskins (1961)*; Dallas Texans (1961); Toronto Rifles (1966)
- * Offseason or practice squad member only

Career NFL statistics
- Receptions: 1
- Receiving yards: 13
- Stats at Pro Football Reference

Charles Edward Barnes (born October 5, 1939) is a former football end in the American Football League (AFL) for the Dallas Texans. He played college football at the University of Arkansas and University of Louisiana at Monroe. Charlie was drafted in the eighth round of the 1961 NFL draft by the Washington Redskins. Barnes was also selected in the nineteenth round of the 1961 AFL draft by the Buffalo Bills. He was traded to the Texans in exchange for a draft pick.
