= Hermitage High School (Arkansas) =

Location
- 312 North School Drive; Hermitage, Arkansas 71647; United States
- Coordinates: 33°27′10″N 92°10′13″W

Information
- Status: Open
- School district: Hermitage School District
- NCES District ID: 0507710
- Authority: Arkansas Department of Education (ADE)
- Superintendent: Tracy Tucker
- CEEB code: 041100
- NCES School ID: 050771000485
- Principal: Mistie McGhee
- Teaching staff: 20.07 (FTE)
- Grades: 7–12
- Enrollment: 202 (2023–2024)
- Student to teacher ratio: 10.06
- Education system: ADE Smart Core curriculum
- Colors: Black white and red (red is debatable because the color "red" is used in the logo)
- Athletics conference: 2A Region 8 (2012–14)
- Mascot: Hermits
- Team name: Hermitage Hustlin' Hermits
- Accreditation: ADE; AdvancED (1951–)
- Communities served: Hermitage
- Feeder schools: Hermitage Elementary School (PK–6)
- Affiliation: Arkansas Activities Association AdvancED (1951–)
- Federal funding: Title I
- Website: www.hermitageschools.org/page/high-school

Hermitage High School is an accredited comprehensive public high school serving students in grades nine through twelve in Hermitage, Arkansas, United States. The school supports families in Hermitage and nearby unincorporated communities in Bradley County and is the sole high school administered by the Hermitage School District.

== Academics ==
The Hermitage High School is accredited by the Arkansas Department of Education (ADE) and has been accredited by AdvancED since 1925.

The assumed course of study follows the Smart Core curriculum developed the Arkansas Department of Education (ADE), which requires students to complete at least 24 credit units before graduation. Students engage in regular and career focus courses and exams and may select Advanced Placement (AP) coursework and exams that provide an opportunity to receive college credit.

== Athletics ==
The Hermitage High School mascot and athletic emblem is the Hermit with school colors of black and white.

For the 2012–14 school years, the Hermitage Hermits participate in the 2A Classification within the 2A Region 8 Conference (football) and 2A Region 7 West Conference (basketball) as administered by the Arkansas Activities Association. The Hermits compete in various interscholastic activities including football, golf (boys/girls), cross country (boys/girls), basketball (boys/girls), baseball, fastpitch softball, track and field (boys/girls), and cheer and even its own marching band.

== Notable alumni ==
- Jeff Wardlaw, District 8 member of the Arkansas House of Representatives, which includes Bradley County.
