= Hermitage, Arkansas =

- City
- Location of Hermitage in Bradley County, Arkansas.
- Coordinates: 33°26′51″N 92°10′17″W
- Country: United States
- State: Arkansas
- County: Bradley

Area
  - Total: 1.07 sq mi (2.76 km^{2})
  - Land: 1.07 sq mi (2.76 km^{2})
  - Water: 0 sq mi (0.00 km^{2})
- Elevation: 157 ft (48 m)

Population (2020)
  - Total: 525
  - Estimate (2025): 516 ▼
  - Density: 490/sq mi (190/km^{2})
- Time zone: UTC-6 (Central (CST))
  - Summer (DST): UTC-5 (CDT)
- ZIP code: 71647
- Area code: 870
- FIPS code: 05-31540
- GNIS feature ID: 2405820

Hermitage is a city in Bradley County, Arkansas, United States. As of the 2020 census, Hermitage had a population of 525.

Jeff Wardlaw, the District 8 member of the Arkansas House of Representatives, operates Wardlaw Brothers Farms, Inc., in Hermitage.

== Geography ==
According to the United States Census Bureau, the town has a total area of 3.0 km^{2} (1.2 sq mi), all land.

== Demographics ==
Historical population
Census	Pop.	Note	%±
1910	247		—
1920	285		15.4%
1930	419		47.0%
1940	344		−17.9%
1950	398		15.7%
1960	379		−4.8%
1970	399		5.3%
1980	378		−5.3%
1990	639		69.0%
2000	769		20.3%
2010	830		7.9%
2020	525		−36.7%
2025 (est.)	516	▼	−1.7%
U.S. Decennial Census

As of the census of 2000, there were 769 people, 219 households, and 142 families residing in the town. The population density was258.2 people /km^{2} (669 people/mi^{2}). There were 361 housing units at an average density of 121.2 units /km^{2} (314 units/mi^{2}). The racial makeup of the town was 45.25% White, 30.30% Black or African American, 0.26% Native American, 0.13% Asian, 22.50% from other races, and 1.56% from two or more races. 27.57% of the population were Hispanic or Latino of any race.

There were 261 households, out of which 42.9% had children under the age of 18 living with them, 40.2% were married couples living together, 26.1% had a female householder with no husband present, and 28.4% were non-families. 24.5% of all households were made up of individuals, and 11.5% had someone living alone who was 65 years of age or older. The average household size was 2.95 and the average family size was 3.51.

In the town, the population was spread out, with 36.8% under the age of 18, 14.2% from 18 to 24, 26.0% from 25 to 44, 13.9% from 45 to 64, and 9.1% who were 65 years of age or older. The median age was 24 years. For every 100 females, there were 94.7 males. For every 100 females age 18 and over, there were 91.3 males.

The median income for a household in the town was $18,438, and the median income for a family was $24,792. Males had a median income of $21,136 versus $17,500 for females. The per capita income for the town was $10,571. About 34.8% of families and 39.3% of the population were below the poverty line, including 51.0% of those under age 18 and 18.1% of those age 65 or over.

== Public schools ==
The Hermitage School District serves the residents of the southern part of Bradley County, Arkansas, United States. Hermitage is known for its Future Farmers of America program. In 2001, The Hermitage High School forestry team won the national championships in forestry.

The Southeast Arkansas Public Library operates the Hermitage Branch Library.

== Railroad ==
Genesee & Wyoming owns the railroad that goes through Hermitage. The Fordyce & Princeton Railroad had purchased the railroad after the liquidation of Chicago, Rock Island and Pacific Railroad. The Genesee & Wyoming passes through Hermitage. The railroad runs from Tinsman to Crossett, Arkansas, (44 miles) via Banks, Arkansas, Craney, Hermitage, Arkansas, Ingalls, Arkansas, Vick, Arkansas, Broad, Emery, and Whitlow. In the past, a branch of the Warren and Saline River Railroad connected between Warren, Arkansas and the Chicago, Rock Island and Pacific Railroad just north of Hermitage.

In the early 1900s, the Chicago, Rock Island and Pacific Railroad (CRI&PR) was built by Hermitage to allowed timber and lumber to move between the sawmills in Crossett to Fordyce. The Fordyce Lumber Company sawmills to The Crossett Lumber Company. Both companies were owned by Charles Warner Gates, John Wenzel Watzek and Edward Savage Crossett. On March 10, 1907, the Chicago, Rock Island and Pacific Railroad (CRI&PR) connected the town of Crossett to Fordyce.

== See also ==
- Bradley County, Arkansas
