= Adams House =

Adams House may refer to:

== In England ==
- Adams House (London), a listed building
- The Adams House, York, a listed building

== In the United States ==
- Captain Adams House, Daphne, Alabama, listed on the National Register of Historic Places
- W. E. Adams House, Phoenix, Arizona, listed on the National Register of Historic Places
- James P. and Sarah Adams House, Tucson, Arizona, listed on the National Register of Historic Places
- Adams-Leslie House, Warren, Arkansas
- Davis-Adams House, Warren, Arkansas
- Orman-Adams House, Pueblo, Colorado
- Joseph T. Adams House, Georgetown, Delaware
- Carl G. Adams House, Miami Springs, Florida
- Adams-Matheson House, Hartwell, Georgia
- Adams House (Lavonia, Georgia), listed on the National Register of Historic Places
- William and Jessie M. Adams House, Chicago, Illinois
- Mary W. Adams House, Highland Park, Illinois
- Noftzger-Adams House, North Manchester, Indiana
- Walker Adams House, Davenport, Iowa
- Adams-Higgins House, Spencer, Iowa
- Adams House (Salvisa, Kentucky)
- Blanks House, Columbia, Louisiana, also known as the Adams House
- Adams House (Baton Rouge, Louisiana), listed on the National Register of Historic Places
- Charles P. Adams House, Grambling, Louisiana
- Archibald-Adams House, Cherryfield, Maine
- Adams-Crocker-Fish House, Barnstable, Massachusetts
- Adams House (Harvard University), Cambridge, Massachusetts
- Adams-Clarke House, Georgetown, Massachusetts
- Abraham Adams House, Newbury, Massachusetts
- Amos Adams House, Newton, Massachusetts
- Seth Adams House, Newton, Massachusetts
- Adams National Historical Park, Quincy, Massachusetts
- John Quincy Adams Birthplace, Quincy, Massachusetts
- John Adams Birthplace, Quincy, Massachusetts
- Peacefield, the home of U.S. President John Adams and other Adamses, Quincy, Massachusetts
- Adams-Magoun House, Somerville, Massachusetts
- Charles Adams-Woodbury Locke House, Somerville, Massachusetts
- Benjamin Adams House, Uxbridge, Massachusetts
- Adams-French House, Aberdeen, Mississippi, listed on the National Register of Historic Places
- Adams-Taylor-McRae House, Elwood Community, Mississippi
- John A. Adams Farmstead Historic District, Warrensburg, Missouri
- Adams House (Carson City, Nevada)
- John Adams Homestead-Wellscroft, Harrisville, New Hampshire
- Dr. Daniel Adams House, Keene, New Hampshire
- Adams-Ryan House, Adams Basin, New York
- Judge Junius G. Adams House, Biltmore Forest, North Carolina
- John H. Adams House, High Point, North Carolina
- Adams-Edwards House, Raleigh, North Carolina
- Adams-Fairview Bonanza Farm, Wahepton, North Dakota
- G. Adams House, Millersburg, Ohio
- John and Maria Adams House, Olmsted Falls, Ohio
- Adams-Gray House, Trinway, Ohio
- George W. Adams House, Trinway, Ohio
- Demas Adams House, Worthington, Ohio
- Charles F. Adams House, Portland, Oregon
- Louis J. Adams House, Silverton, Oregon
- John E. Adams House, Pawtucket, Rhode Island
- E.C. Adams House, Watertown, South Dakota, listed on the National Register of Historic Places
- Joe Chase Adams House, Lewisburg, Tennessee
- Baptist Female College-Adams House, Woodbury, Tennessee, listed on the National Register of Historic Places
- Armstrong-Adams House, Salado, Texas, listed on the National Register of Historic Places
- Joseph Frederick Adams House, Bluff, Utah
- Joseph Adams House (Layton, Utah)
- George and Temperance Adams House, Orem, Utah
- John Alma Adams House, Pleasant Grove, Utah

== See also ==
- John Adams House (disambiguation)
- Joseph Adams House (disambiguation)
- Adams Block, in Three Forks, Montana
- Adams Building (disambiguation)
- Adams School (disambiguation)
- Adams Farm (disambiguation)
