= Adams Building =

Adams Building and variations may refer to

In the United Kingdom

- Adams Building, Nottingham, UK

In the Canada

- Adams Building, Montreal, Quebec, Canada

In the United States

- Adams Cotton Gin Building, Columbus, Georgia, listed on the NRHP in Muscogee County, Georgia
- Adams Building (Danville, Illinois), listed on the National Register of Historic Places (NRHP)
- Adams-Pickering Block, Bangor, Maine, NRHP-listed
- Adams Building (Quincy, Massachusetts), NRHP-listed
- Adams Building (Sault Ste. Marie, Michigan), NRHP-listed
- Adams Block, Three Forks, Montana, NRHP-listed
- Adams Memorial Building, Derry, New Hampshire, NRHP-listed
- Adams Odd Fellows Hall, Adams, Oregon, NRHP-listed
- John Adams Building of the Library of Congress, Washington, D.C.

== See also ==
- Adams School (disambiguation)
- Adams House (disambiguation)
