= John Adams House =

John Adams House may refer to:

in the United States

(by state)

- Adams National Historic Site, Quincy, Massachusetts, birthplaces of two U.S. presidents
- John Quincy Adams Birthplace, Quincy, Massachusetts, listed on the NRHP in Massachusetts
- John Adams Birthplace, Quincy, Massachusetts, listed on the NRHP in Massachusetts
- Peacefield, or "Old House," the home of U.S. President John Adams and other Adamses, in Quincy, Massachusetts
- John A. Adams Farmstead Historic District, Warrensburg, Missouri, listed on the NRHP in Johnson County, Missouri
- John Adams Homestead-Wellscroft, Harrisville, New Hampshire, NRHP-listed
- John H. Adams House, High Point, North Carolina, listed on the NRHP in Guilford County, North Carolina
- John and Maria Adams House, Olmsted Falls, Ohio, NRHP-listed
- John E. Adams House, Pawtucket, Rhode Island, NRHP-listed
- John Alma Adams House, Pleasant Grove, Utah, NRHP-listed

== See also ==
- Adams House (disambiguation)
