= Adams Farm =

Adams Farm may refer to:

- Adams Farm (Princess Anne, Maryland)
- Adams Farm (Harrisville, New Hampshire)

== See also ==
- Adams-Fairview Bonanza Farm, Wahepton, North Dakota
- Adams House (disambiguation)
- John A. Adams Farmstead Historic District, Warrensburg, Missouri
