= Jane Addams High School =

Jane Addams High School may refer to:

- Jane Addams Business Careers Center - Cleveland, Ohio
- Jane Addams High School for Academic Careers - Bronx, New York City

== See also ==
- Adams High School (disambiguation)
