= Joseph Adams House =

Joseph Adams House may refer to:

in the United States

(by state)

- Joseph T. Adams House, Georgetown, Delaware
- Joseph Frederick Adams House, Bluff, Utah
- Joseph Adams House (Layton, Utah)

== See also ==
- Adams House (disambiguation)
