= JAHS =

JAHS may refer to:

- John Adams High School (disambiguation), multiple schools
- Jonathan Alder High School
