= Weymouth Meeting House Historic District =

Historic district in Massachusetts, United States

- U.S. National Register of Historic Places
- U.S. Historic district
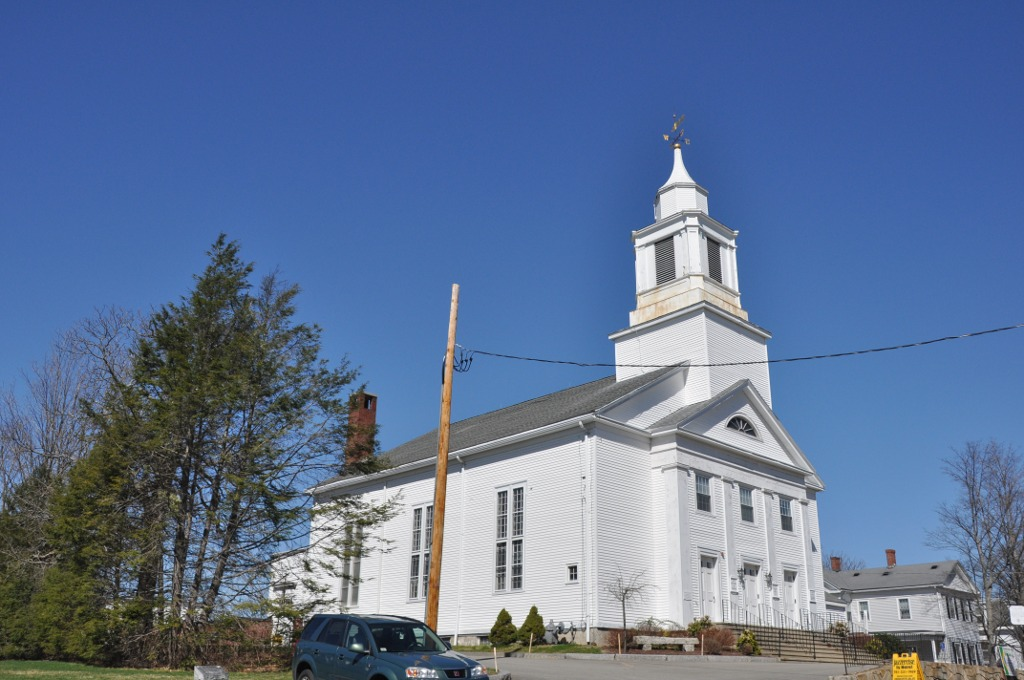
- First Church in Weymouth (1833)

- Location within Massachusetts Location within the United States
- Location: Weymouth, Massachusetts
- Coordinates: 42°13′48″N 70°56′38″W
- Area: 31 acres (13 ha)
- NRHP reference No.: 10001007
- Added to NRHP: December 13, 2010

The Weymouth Meeting House Historic District encompasses one of the oldest sections of Weymouth, Massachusetts. This area, centered on a cluster of properties near Church, East, Green, North, and Norton Streets, includes the city's oldest cemetery (the North Cemetery, established c. 1636), the site of its first meeting house, the 1833 church of its first congregation, the birthplace of presidential wife and mother Abigail Adams, and the John Adams School, Weymouth's oldest surviving schoolhouse. The area was the center of Weymouth until 1723, and then North Weymouth until 1833.

The district was added to the National Register of Historic Places in 2010.

== See also ==
- National Register of Historic Places listings in Norfolk County, Massachusetts
