= Gowan Block =

Historic commercial building in Sault Ste. Marie, Michigan, USA

- U.S. National Register of Historic Places
- U.S. Historic district – Contributing property
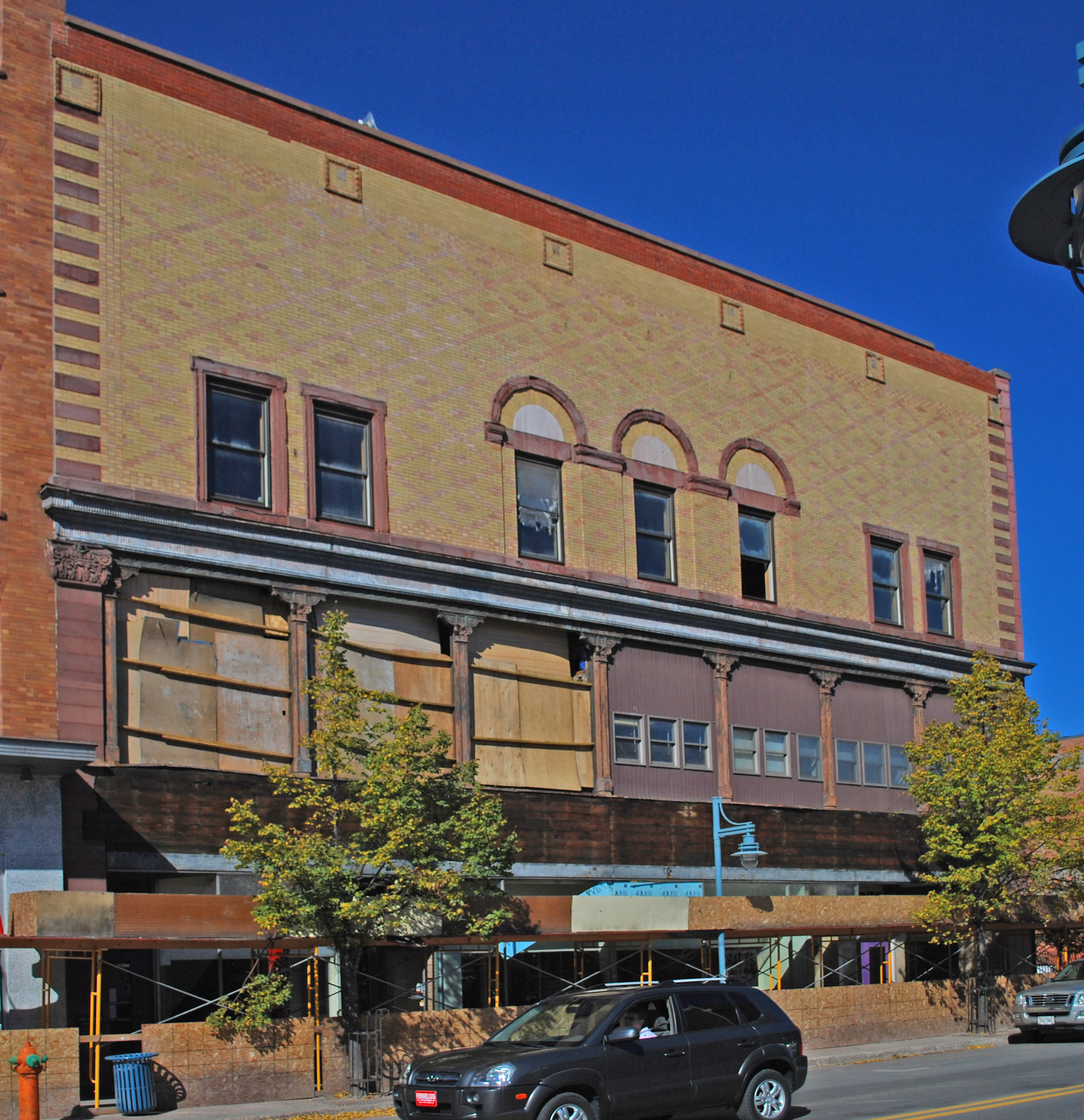

- Location within Michigan Location within the United States
- Interactive map
- Location: 416 Ashmun St., Sault Ste. Marie, Michigan
- Coordinates: 46°29′53″N 84°20′51″W
- Area: less than one acre
- Built: 1901
- Built by: Lipsett & Sinclair
- Architect: Edward Demar (Charlton, Gilbert and Demar)
- Architectural style: Late Victorian
- Part of: Sault Ste. Marie Historic Commercial District (ID100005683)
- NRHP reference No.: 10000219
- Added to NRHP: April 27, 2010

The Gowan Block, also known as the Masonic Block, was built as a commercial building and meeting hall located at 416 Ashmun Street in Sault Ste. Marie, Michigan. Along with the next-door Adams Building, it is now part of the Park Place City Center, a mixed commercial and residential development. It was listed on the National Register of Historic Places in 2010.

== History ==
John A. Gowan and Albert F. Pickford opened a hardware store, Gowan & Pickford, in 1900. In 1901, Gowan and Pickford decided to construct a new building, and retained the local firm of Charlton, Gilbert & Demar to design the structure. They hired local contractors Lipsett & Sinclair to build the new structure for $31,700, and construction began in mid-1901, finishing around the end of the year. After construction, Gowan and Pickford occupied the south third of the ground floor, with the remainder housing one portion of the Prenzlauer Bros.' general store, which also occupied a nearby building. The local Masonic Lodge began using upper floors in 1902.

By 1908 the Prenzlauer Bros. store vacated the building, and around 1920 Woolworth's moved into that portion of the ground floor. Gowan & Pickford remained in the southern third, changing its name to Gowan Hardware in 1911 when Albert Pickford left the firm. Gowan Hardware closed in 1949, and Woolworth's expanded into the vacated space.

In 2010, after a few years of financial wrangling, the Masonic Block and the next-door Adams Building were purchased by a developer. Renovations began, with the plan to provide 4,500 square feet of ground-floor commercial space and 24 apartments. The project is known as "Park Place City Center."

== Description ==
The Gowan Block is a Late Victorian three-story brick commercial building with a broad front facade. The front is substantially finished with yellow-buff brickwork, with reddish-brown sandstone used for piers at the outer edges and surrounding the third-story windows. The ground floor has three storefronts. The second floor has seven bays filled with windows and separated by metal pilasters.
