= Adams School =

Adams School may refer to:

- Adams School (Phoenix, Arizona), listed on the National Register of Historic Places (NRHP) in Maricopa County, Arizona
- Adams School (Findlay, Ohio), NRHP-listed
- Haberdashers' Adams, grammar school in Newport, Shropshire, England
- John Adams School, in Weymouth, Massachusetts, NRHP-listed
- Adams School (Amanzimtoti), a Amanzimtoti school near Durban that John Dube attended

== See also ==
- Adams High School (disambiguation)
