= John Adams High School =

John Adams High School may refer to:

- John Adams High School (Indiana), a public high school in South Bend, Indiana
- John Adams High School (Ohio), a public high school located on the east side of Cleveland, Ohio
- John Adams High School (Queens), a public high school in the Ozone Park neighborhood of Queens, New York City
- Adams High School (Portland, Oregon), a public high school in Portland, Oregon

== See also ==
- Adams High School (disambiguation)
