= Adams High School =

Adams High School may refer to several schools in the United States:

- Adams Central High School, Monroe, Indiana
- John Adams High School (Indiana), South Bend, Indiana
- Rochester Adams High School, Rochester Hills, Michigan
- Adams Central Junior-Senior High School, Hastings, Nebraska
- John Adams High School (Queens), New York City, New York
- John Adams High School (Ohio), Cleveland, Ohio
- North Adams High School, Seaman, Ohio
- Adams High School (Oregon), Portland, Oregon
- Bryan Adams High School, Dallas, Texas

== See also ==
- Adams School (disambiguation)
- Jane Addams High School (disambiguation)
