= Adams House (Carson City, Nevada) =

Historic house in Nevada, United States

- U.S. National Register of Historic Places
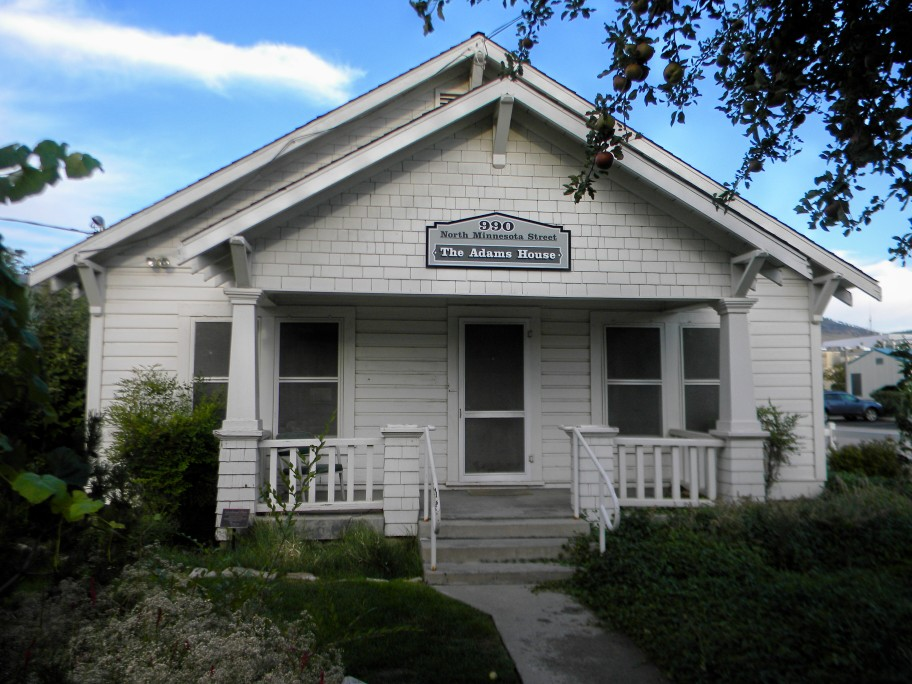

- Location within Nevada Location within the United States
- Location: 990 N. Minnesota St., Carson City, Nevada
- Coordinates: 39°10′9″N 119°46′11″W
- Area: less than one acre
- Built: 1922–23
- Built by: Adams, DeWitt
- Architectural style: Bungalow/craftsman
- NRHP reference No.: 99000700
- Added to NRHP: June 10, 1999

The Adams House in Carson City, Nevada, located at 990 N. Minnesota St., is a historic Bungalow/Craftsman-style house that was built during 1922–23 by DeWitt Adams, for his family. It is a "modest" building but a good example of a small bungalow with American Craftsman architecture. Its design is believed to have been a catalog plan. It was listed on the National Register of Historic Places in 1999.

The property was listed for sale, marketed for use as offices, in 2013.
