= G. Adams House =

Historic house in Ohio, United States

- U.S. National Register of Historic Places
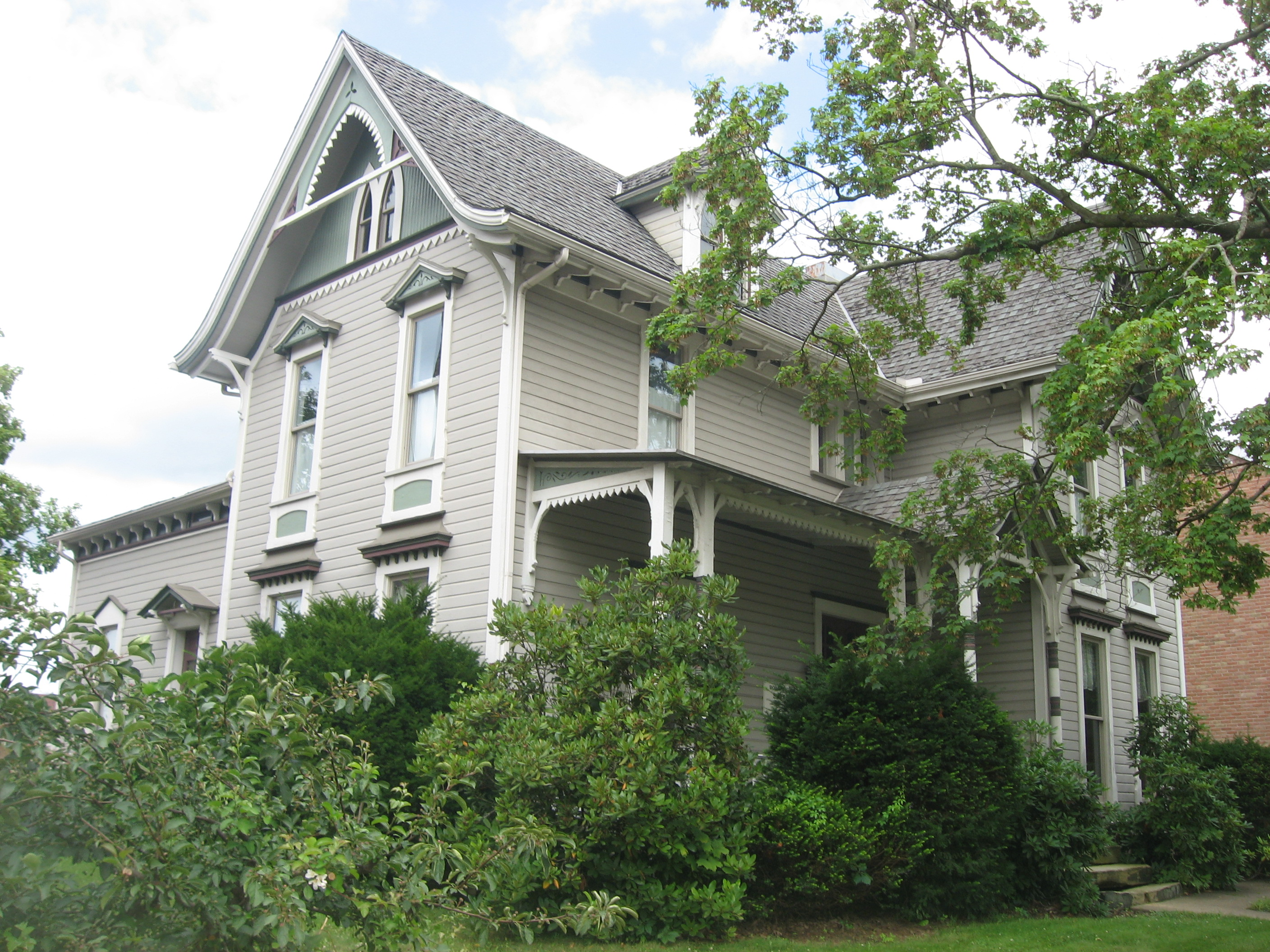
- Front of the G. Adams House, located at 103 N. Clay Street (State Route 83) in Millersburg, Ohio, United States. Built in 1885, it is listed on the National Register of Historic Places, and it is part of a Register-listed historic district, the Millersburg Historic District.

- Location within Ohio Location within the United States
- Location: Millersburg, Ohio
- Coordinates: 40°33′17.86″N 81°55′2.42″W
- Architectural style: Gothic and Stick-Eastlake
- MPS: Millersburg MRA
- NRHP reference No.: 84003730
- Added to NRHP: 1984-07-17

G. Adams House is a registered historic building in Millersburg, Ohio, listed in the National Register on 1984-07-17.

It is a two-and-a-half-story building with Eastlake-style detailing in its front porch and gabled eaves. It was home of George Adams, president of the J. & G. Adams Bank, founded in Millersburg in 1870.

== Historic uses ==
- Single Dwelling
