= Adams Farm (Princess Anne, Maryland) =

Historic house in Maryland

- U.S. National Register of Historic Places
- Location within Maryland Location within the United States
- Nearest city: Old Princess Anne Westover Road, Princess Anne, Maryland
- Coordinates: 38°11′35″N 76°1′48″W
- Area: 12.7 acres (5.1 ha)
- Architectural style: Colonial Revival, Late Victorian, Greek Revival
- NRHP reference No.: 88002140
- Added to NRHP: November 10, 1988

Adams Farm is a historic home and farm complex located near Princess Anne, Somerset County, Maryland, United States. It consists of a 2 1/2-story, 19th-century frame house with Greek Revival trim that was enlarged and reconfigured with Late Victorian alterations in the third quarter of the century and Colonial Revival changes about 1900. Also on the property are numerous domestic and agricultural outbuildings most of which date from the late 19th century.

The Adams Farm was listed on the National Register of Historic Places in 1988.
