= Adams-Taylor-McRae House =

- U.S. National Register of Historic Places
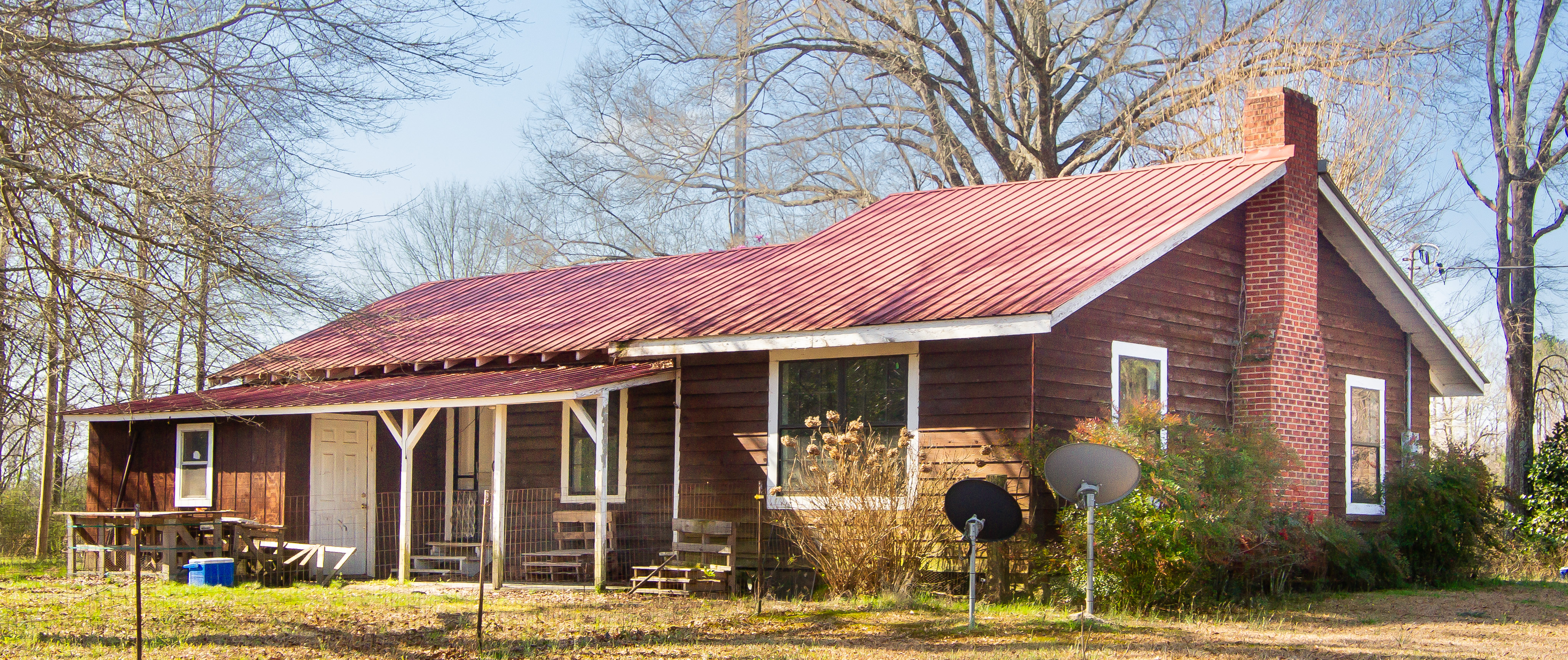
- The house in 2022
- Interactive map of Adams-Taylor-McRae House
- Location: Elwood, Mississippi, U.S.
- Coordinates: 32.021667°N 88.789167°W
- Built: c. 1845
- Architect: John Adams
- Architectural style: Vernacular
- NRHP reference No.: 80002207
- Added to NRHP: May 22, 1980

The Adams-Taylor-McRae House is a historic house in the community of Elwood, Mississippi, United States, east of the town of Pachuta. It is a log cabin constructed by John Adams around 1845, making it the oldest home in Clarke County. It was listed on the National Register of Historic Places on May 22, 1980.

== Description ==
The house is a one-story log cabin built of square-hewn logs with half-dovetail corner notches. A cotton house and a corn crib are adjacent to the house. The cotton house on the property, also of a horizontal log construction, is supposedly older than the main house.

Inside the house, as of 1980, were seven rooms, including a kitchen and bathroom. In a 1980 piece from The Clarke County Tribune, the house was listed as being connected to electricity, telephone, television, and radio. Peepholes and apertures were noted throughout the house, suggesting that protection from threats was of great concern. In front of the house is a large porch.

== History ==
The house was built by settler John Adams in the rural community of Elwood, Mississippi, around 1845. He built the house out of hewn logs and was originally a one-room log cabin. The house is the oldest in Clarke County.

Jody Cook, an architectural historian for the Mississippi Department of Archives and History, prepared nominations for a number of Antebellum houses in Clarke County for the National Register of Historic Places, including the Adams-Taylor-McRae House. The house was listed on May 22, 1980. Its historical significance was attributed to the fact that the house had been in continuous ownership of the same family since 1845 and for it being a stop on a ridge road connecting Mobile, Alabama, with Clarke County.

At the time of its listing, the house was owned by Gertrude McRae, whom The Clarke County Tribune described as "a legend in her own time" and as being "known throughout the county." McRae was known for touting the historicity of the cabin and for having total recall of facts and dates relating to the cabin. When she was first handed the property, it was about 11,000 acres (45,000,000 m^{2}) in size, though by 1980 the property was 336 acres (1,360,000 m^{2}).
