= Adams-Crocker-Fish House =

Historic house in Massachusetts, United States

- U.S. National Register of Historic Places
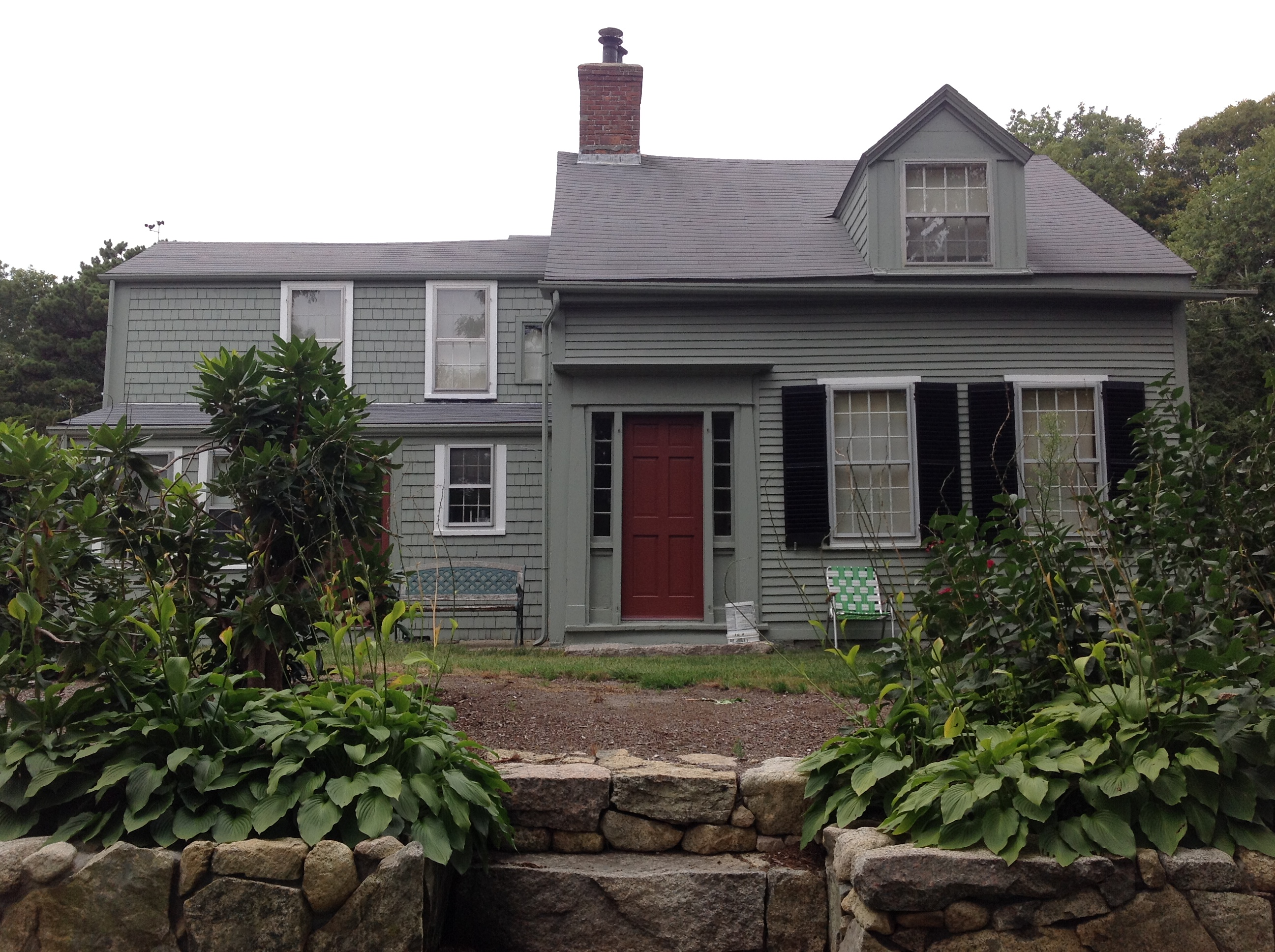

- Location within Cape Cod Location within Massachusetts Location within the United States
- Location: 449 Willow St., Barnstable, Massachusetts
- Coordinates: 41°42′7″N 70°23′22″W
- Built: 1830
- Architectural style: Greek Revival
- MPS: Barnstable MRA
- NRHP reference No.: 87000219
- Added to NRHP: March 13, 1987

The Adams-Crocker-Fish House is an historic house in Barnstable, Massachusetts. Built about 1830, this half-Cape is a rare surviving example of a small farmstead with period outbuildings. The property was listed on the National Register of Historic Places in 1987.

== Description and history ==
The Adams-Crocker-Fish House stands in a rural residential area of northwestern Barnstable, on the west side of Willow Street a short way south of its junction with Cedar Street. The property includes a Greek Revival Cape-style cottage and two outbuildings. The cottage is a 1 1/2-story "half-Cape" (three bays wide), with a gabled roof and wooden clapboard and shingle siding. A modern two-story ell extends to the left at a recess from the main block, and another ell projects to the rear. Across the driveway further to the left are two small rectangular utility buildings that are former farm outbuildings. The main entrance, in the left bay of the main block, has a Greek Revival surround with sidelight windows, simple pilasters, and a corniced entablature.

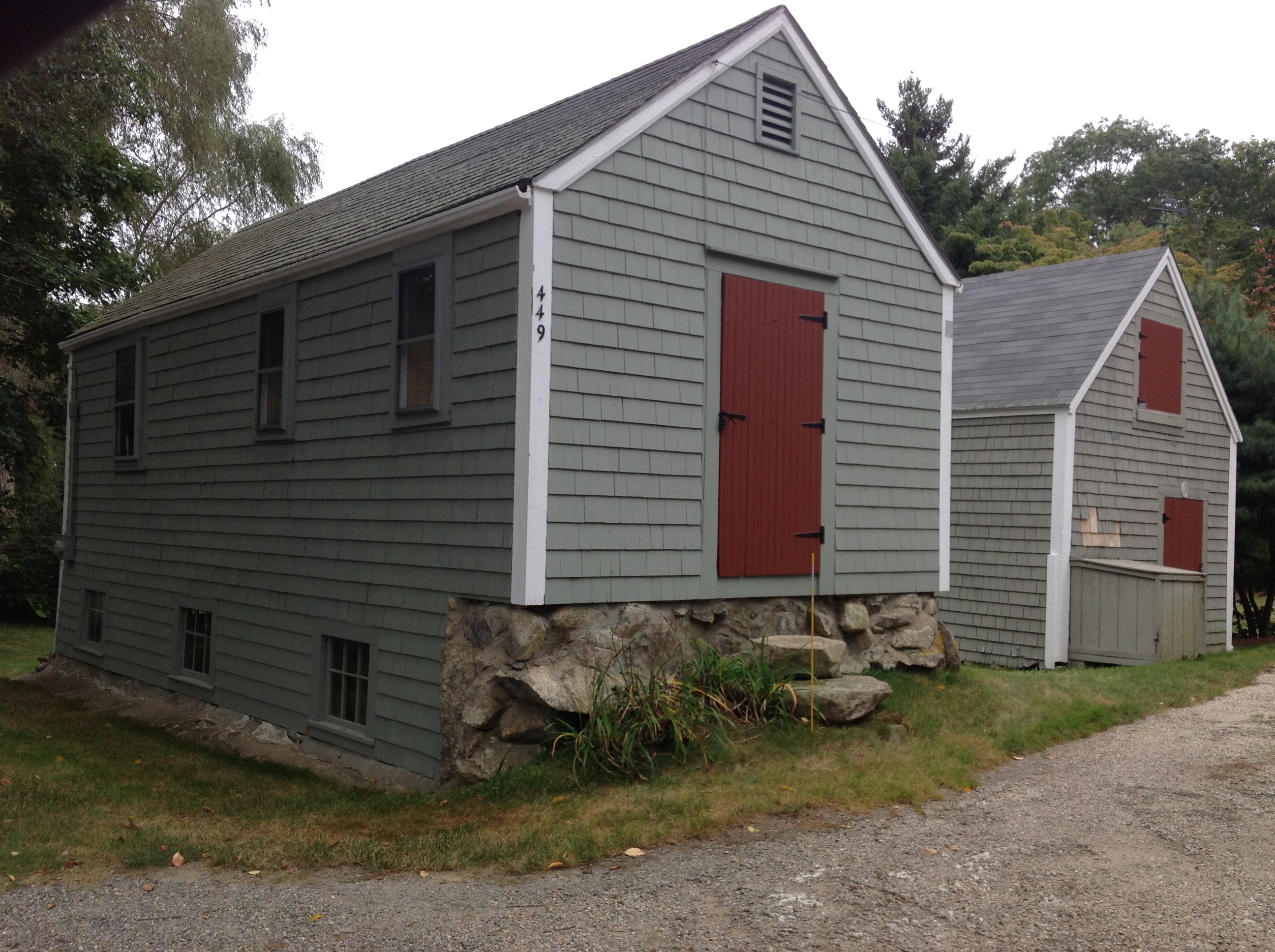
Other buildings on the property

The cottage was built before 1830 by Obadiah Adams, and is said by longtime residents to have originally stood at a location now occupied by the Mid-Cape Highway. It was moved to this location in 1831 by John Blossom, who had acquired the Adams estate. He sold the property the following year to Lemuel Crocker, whose widow sold it to Isaac Fish in 1856. It remained in the Fish family until 1903, and has since passed through a number of other private hands. It is historically significant for both the well-preserved form of the original half-Cape, and for the surviving outbuildings.

== See also ==
- National Register of Historic Places listings in Barnstable County, Massachusetts
