= Seth Adams House =

Historic house in Massachusetts, United States

- U.S. National Register of Historic Places
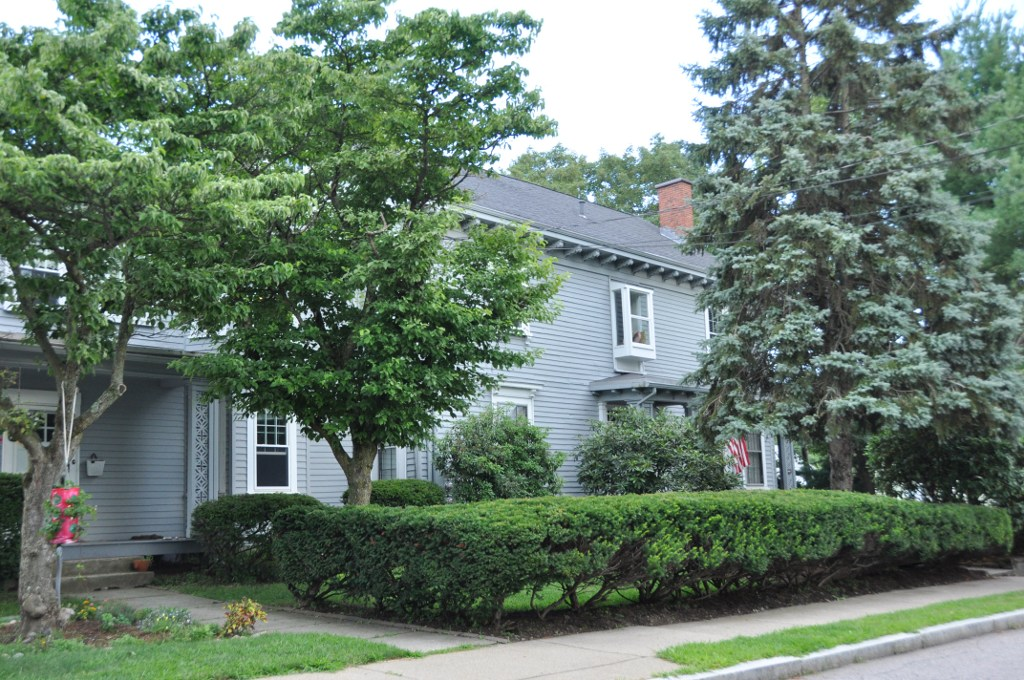

- Location within Massachusetts Location within the United States
- Location: 72 Jewett St., Newton, Massachusetts
- Coordinates: 42°21′31″N 71°11′27″W
- Area: less than one acre
- Built: 1860
- Architectural style: Italianate
- MPS: Newton MRA
- NRHP reference No.: 86001768
- Added to NRHP: September 4, 1986

The Seth Adams House is a historic house at 72 Jewett Street, in the Newton Corner village of Newton, Massachusetts. Probably built in the mid-1850s, it is a well-preserved example of Italianate architecture. During the 1870s it was home to Seth Adams, one of Newton's wealthiest residents. The house was listed on the National Register of Historic Places in 1986.

== Description and history ==
The Seth Adams House stands in a residential area on the northwest side of Newton Corner, at the northeast corner of Pearl and Jewett Streets, on a small lot with a low stone retaining wall on the street-facing sides. It is a 2 1/2-story wood-frame structure, with a gabled roof and clapboarded exterior. It is oriented facing south toward Pearl Street, but its main facade is largely obscured by mature plantings. The eaves and gables are adorned with evenly spaced Italianate brackets, and the front windows have bracketed sills and lintels. The main facade is three bays wide on the first floor and four on the second, with entrance at the center, framed by sidelight and transom windows. A single-story porch extends across the front, supported by latticed square posts.

The house was probably built in the 1850s, when the Newton Corner area was dotted with country estates of wealthy Boston businessmen. In 1874 it was home to Seth Adams, one of Newton's wealthiest residents. He was a major benefactor of the Adams-Nervine Asylum in Jamaica Plain. The house is now a condominium consisting of 3 apartments.

== See also ==
- National Register of Historic Places listings in Newton, Massachusetts
