= Demas Adams House =

Historic house in Ohio, United States

- U.S. National Register of Historic Places
- U.S. Historic district – Contributing property
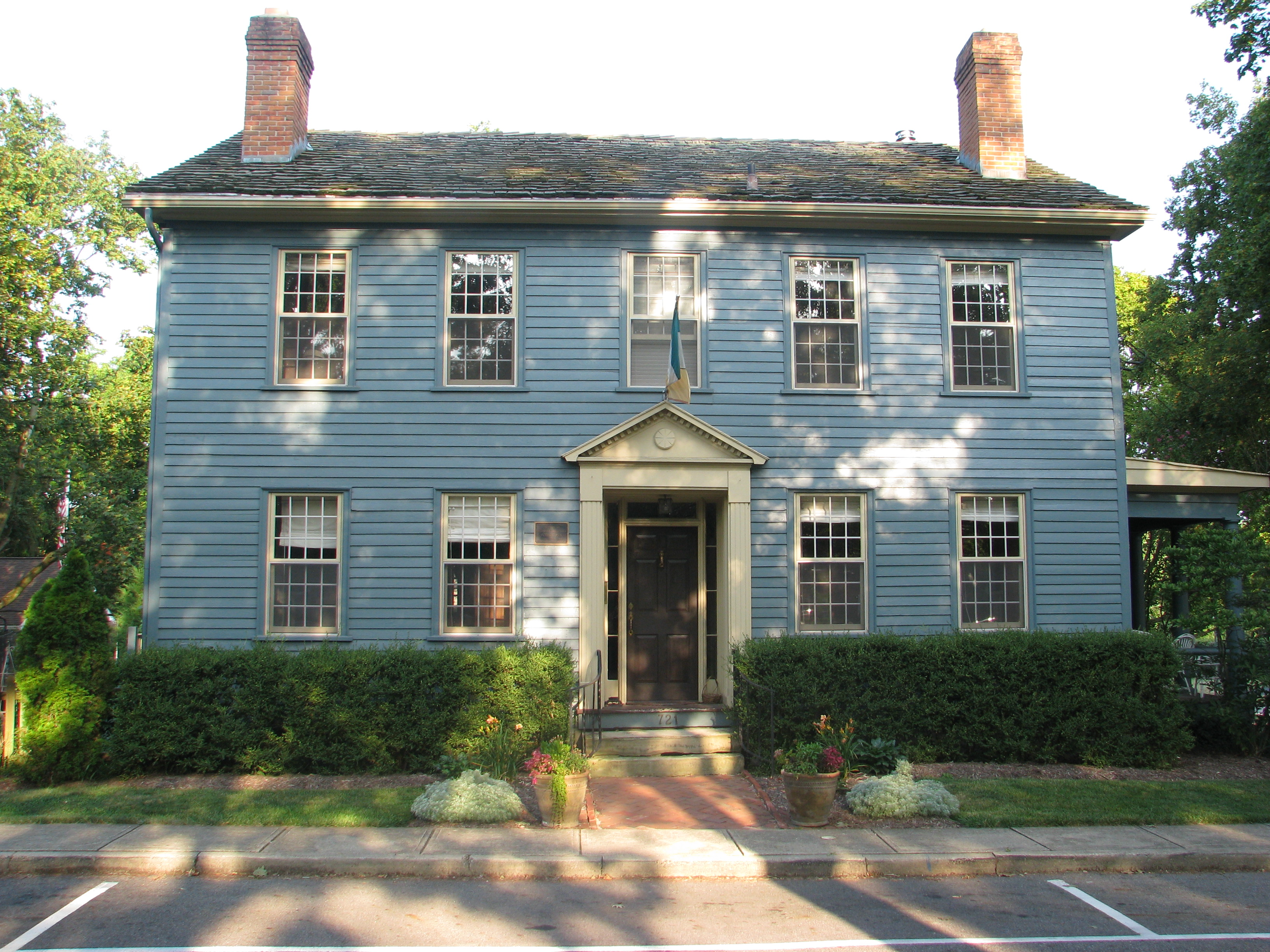
- Front of the house

- Location within Ohio Location within the United States
- Location: 721 High St., Worthington, Ohio
- Coordinates: 40°5′19″N 83°1′7.5″W
- Area: Less than 1 acre (0.40 ha)
- Built: 1818
- Architectural style: Federal
- Part of: Worthington Historic District (ID10000190)
- MPS: Worthington MRA
- NRHP reference No.: 80003005
- Added to NRHP: April 17, 1980

The Demas Adams House is a historic residence in the Columbus-area city of Worthington, Ohio, United States. Constructed for a second-generation settler, it retains an extensive degree of its original 1810s architecture, and it has been named a historic site.

Demas Adams, the original resident, arranged for the construction of the house in 1818 for himself and his wife, a daughter of Worthington founder James Kilbourn. By the 1850s, it had passed out of the Adams family and was home to Methodist preacher Uriah Heath, who helped to establish the Worthington Female Seminary. For more than a century, the black walnut original weatherboarding remained in place, but new siding was installed over the original in 1952.

Built in the Federal style, the Adams House remains a weatherboarded structure, placed atop a foundation of stucco. The symmetrical two-story facade is divided into five bays, with a window in each except for the door in the center of the first story. This doorway is slightly recessed from the rest of the facade, and a small pediment is placed between the doorway and the central second-story window. Less wide than the facade, and divided into just three bays, the sides rise to gables with a third-story window. Chimneys are placed near the roofline, while the roof itself is shingled. Inside, the house has experienced few changes; the ash floors, fireplaces, and additional wooden elements installed at the time of construction are still present. It is the oldest of several braced-frame houses still standing in Worthington.

In 1980, the Adams House was listed on the National Register of Historic Places, qualifying both because of its architecture and because of its connection to Uriah Heath. It is one of more than thirty locations listed on the Register in Worthington, along with such sites as the public square in front of the house, and the Worthington Historic District that encompasses the blocks surrounding the square.
