= Jane Addams High School for Academic Careers =

Defunct high school in New York City

Information
- School district: New York City Department of Education

Jane Addams High School for Academic Careers (08X650) was a high school in the Bronx. It was a part of the New York City Department of Education. It was in proximity to Yankee Stadium.

Sharron Smalls served as principal until 2012. She left her position and moved to another school after accusations that the school gave students academic credits for courses they never completed had been made. In December 2011 the City of New York began plans to discontinue Addams High. Accusations included "double dipping", where only one class was taken but the school wrongly assigned two or more sets of credits.
