= Walker Adams House =

Historic house in Iowa, United States

- U.S. National Register of Historic Places
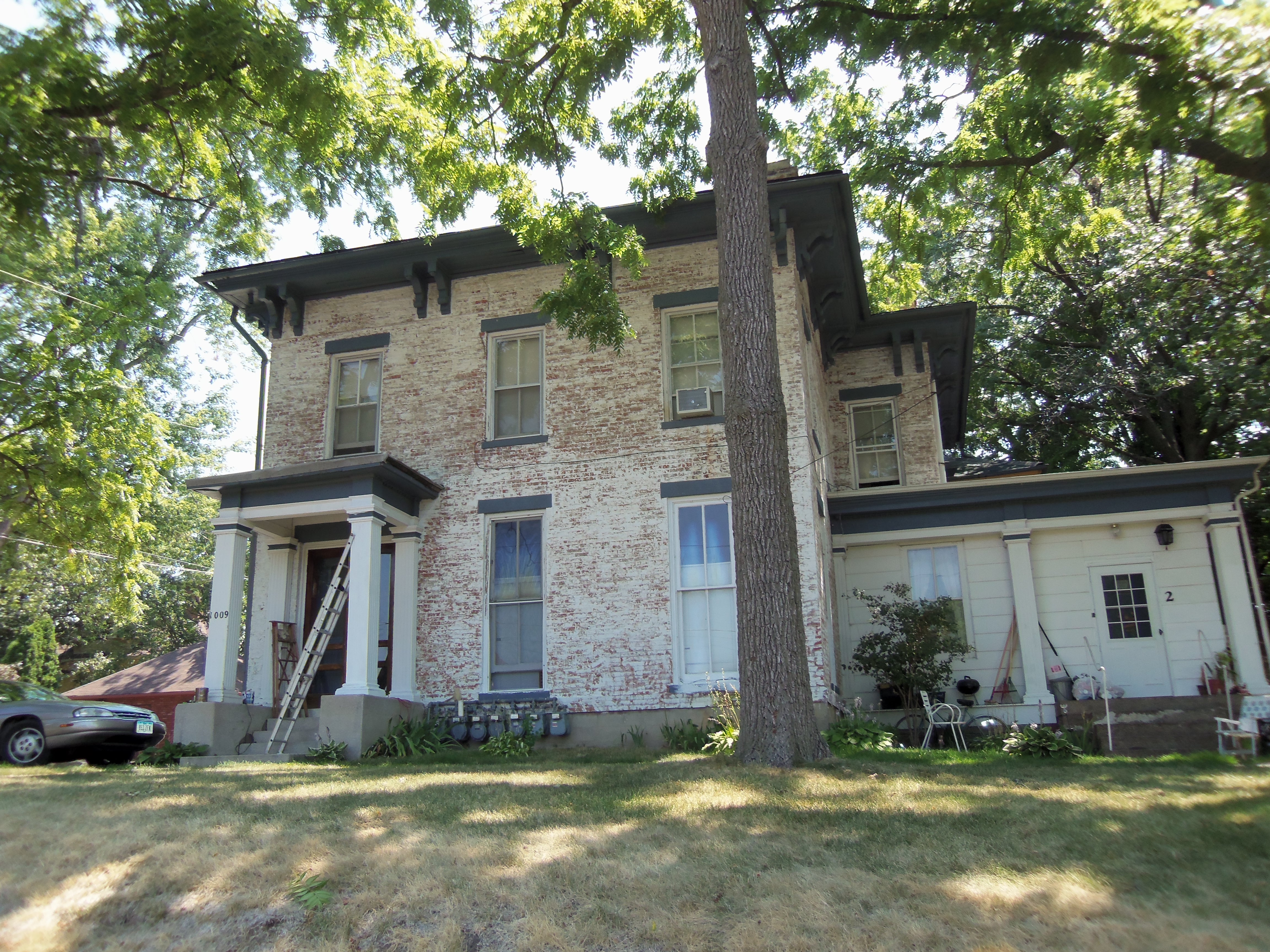

- Location within Iowa Location within the United States
- Location: 1009 College Ave., Davenport, Iowa
- Coordinates: 41°31′49″N 90°33′22″W
- Area: less than one acre
- Built: c. 1875
- Architectural style: Italianate
- MPS: Davenport MRA
- NRHP reference No.: 84001313
- Added to NRHP: July 27, 1984

The Walker Adams House is a historic building located on the eastside of Davenport, Iowa. It was listed on the National Register of Historic Places in 1984.

== History ==
Walker Adams was a partner in a cooperage before he became a wholesaler of shingles and staves. Adams and his family lived on this property since 1868. This is probably the second house located here as the exterior features suggest a later date. After Walker's death, his wife Mary continued to live in the house into the 1890s.

== Architecture ==
There are a number of Italianate houses such as this one in the Fulton Addition to the city of Davenport. Its vertical proportions and the millwork decoration on the eaves represents the post-Civil War expression of the style. The two-story brick house features a hipped roof, a three-bay front and an entrance that is left of center. The veranda on the south side has subsequently been enclosed. The porches have fluted posts with entablature. A bracketed cornice is just below the roofline. It also features a single molding strip at the base of the frieze that was a popular detail in mid-19th century Davenport.
