= Adams Building (Danville, Illinois) =

- U.S. National Register of Historic Places
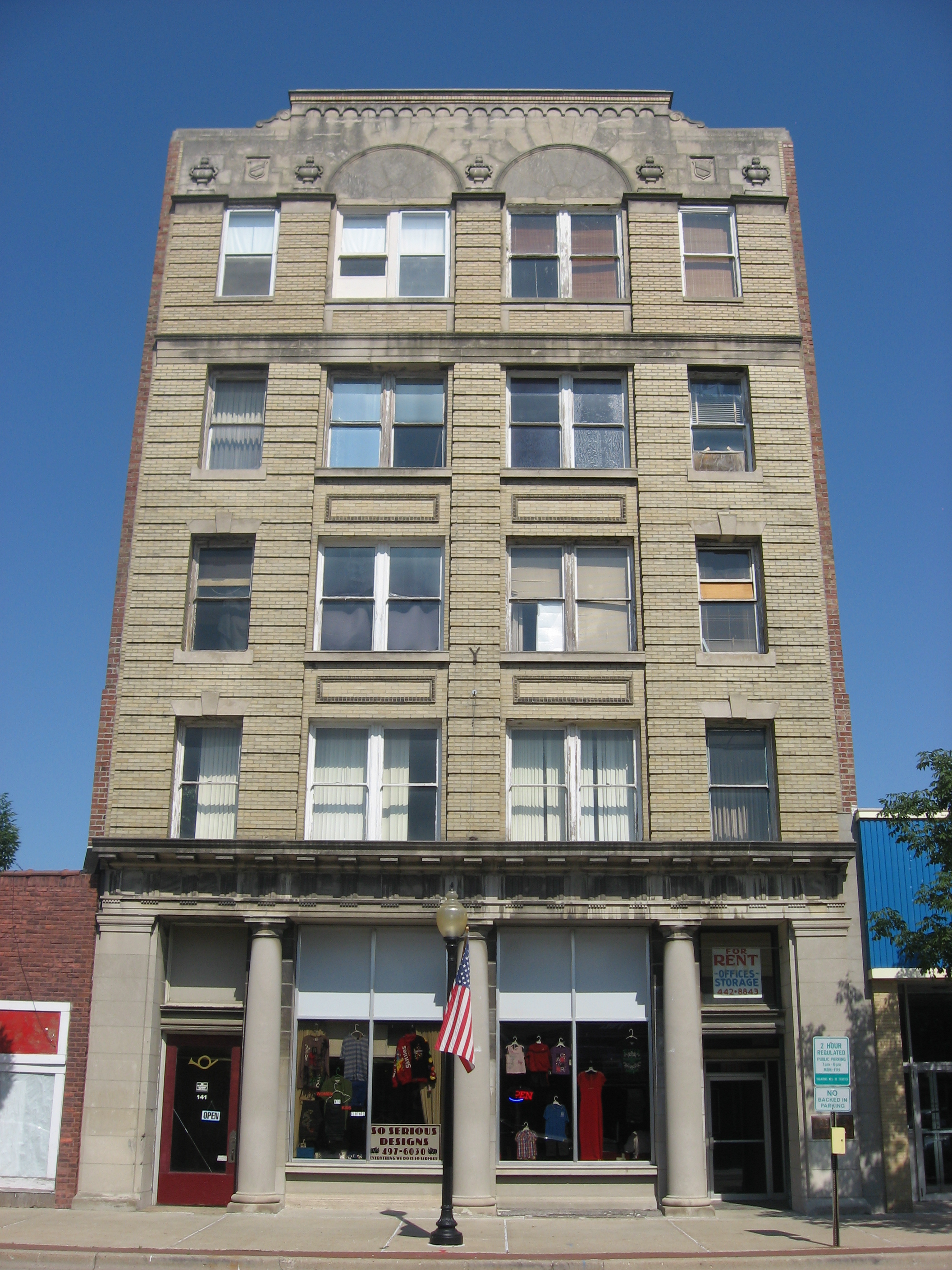

- Location within Illinois Location within the United States
- Location: 139-141 N. Vermilion St., Danville, Illinois
- Coordinates: 40°7′39″N 87°37′47″W
- Area: less than one acre
- Built: 1905
- Architectural style: Classical Revival
- NRHP reference No.: 00001337
- Added to NRHP: November 15, 2000

The Adams Building (also known as the Bridgett Building) is a five-story office building located at 139-141 N. Vermilion St. in Danville, Illinois.

== Description and history ==
Developer William Bridgett had the building constructed in 1905. The first floor of the building is built with stone, while the upper floors are built from brick; the fifth story, a 1928 addition, matches the lower floors in design. Three Doric columns on the first floor separate the building's four bays, and Doric pilasters flank the first floor. The first floor is topped by a Doric entablature, which is separated into a frieze and cornice. On the upper stories, brick piers divide the four bays. The building's original architrave, a remnant from the building's expansion, separates the fourth and fifth stories. A decorative stone section above the fifth floor is topped by a parapet wall.

The building was added to the National Register of Historic Places on November 15, 2000.
