= Adams Building (Sault Ste. Marie, Michigan) =

- U.S. National Register of Historic Places
- U.S. Historic district – Contributing property
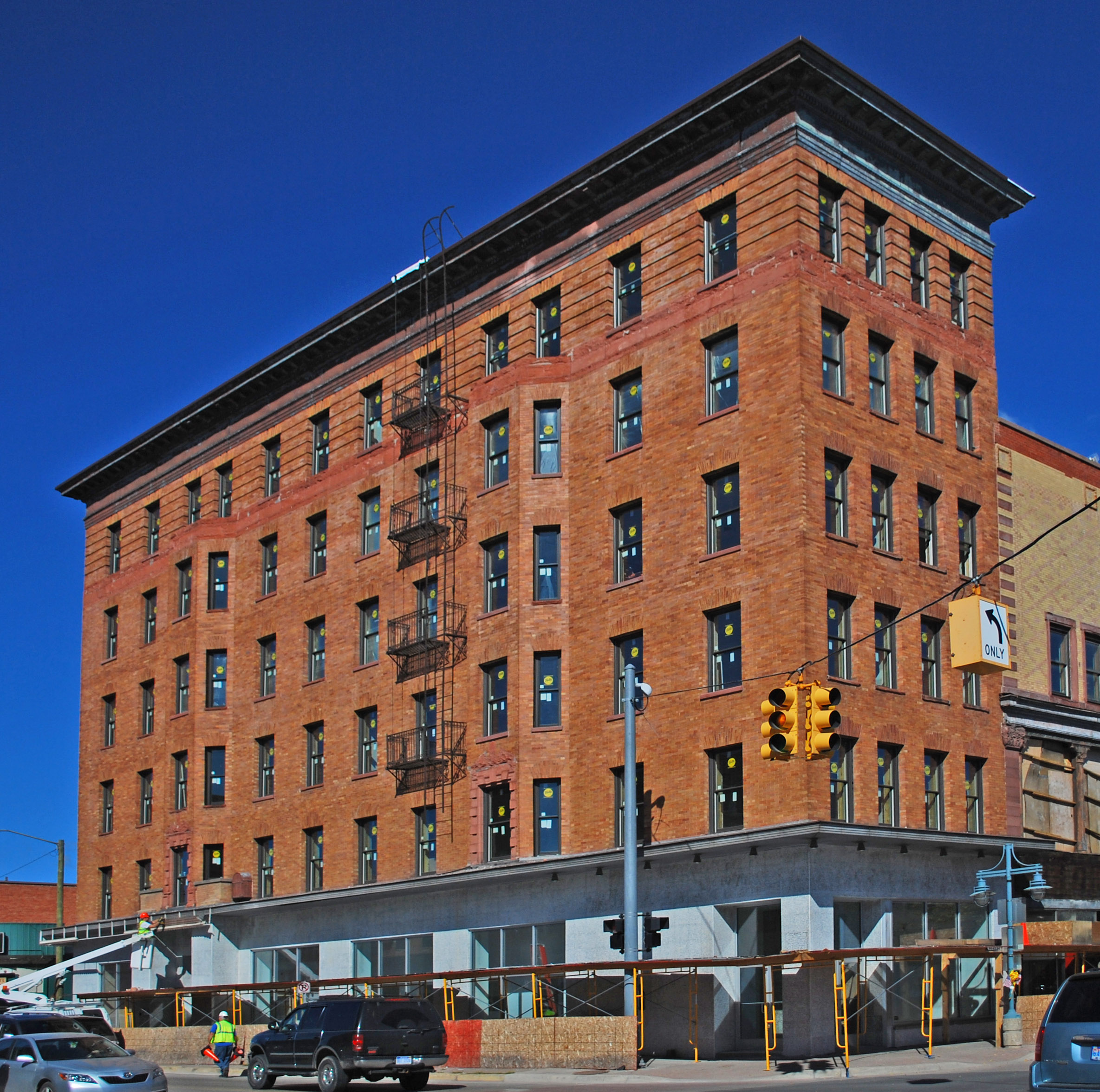

- Location within Michigan Location within the United States
- Interactive map
- Location: 418 Ashmun St., Sault Ste. Marie, Michigan
- Coordinates: 46°29′52″N 84°20′52″W
- Area: less than one acre
- Built: 1903
- Built by: Marshall N. Hunt
- Architect: Edward Demar
- Architectural style: Late Victorian
- Part of: Sault Ste. Marie Historic Commercial District (ID100005683)
- NRHP reference No.: 10000218
- Added to NRHP: April 27, 2010

The Adams Building, also known as the Central Savings Bank Building, was built as a commercial and office building located at 418 Ashmun Street in Sault Ste. Marie, Michigan. Along with the next-door Gowan Block, it is now part of the Park Place City Center, a mixed commercial and residential development. It was listed on the National Register of Historic Places in 2010.

== Robert N. Adams ==
Robert Adams was born in Ontario on May 13, 1844, the sixth child of John and Ann Adams. At the age of 23 he began working his own farm in Ontario. In 1877 he married Elizabeth N. Carr. The couple had six children: George, Augusta, John, Gertrude, Clement, and Lillian.

In 1879 Adams moved to Michigan and purchased 150 acres of land that was at the time undeveloped, but is now within the boundaries of Sault Ste. Marie. Adams cleared the land and platted it, selling lots which eventually became some of the most substantial residential and commercial sections of the city. Adams also engaged in grocery, merchandising, and banking businesses, and represented the area in the state legislature.

== Building history ==
The Central Savings Bank of Sault Ste. Marie was incorporated in December 1902, with Robert N. Adams as its first president. Adams hired Edward Demar to design a building, and in 1903, built what was called "one of the most modern and architecturally attractive bank and office buildings in the Northern Peninsula." He christened it the Adams Building. A portion of the first floor of the building was reserved for the Central Savings Bank, while the rest of the building was used by other businesses.

In 1904, Central Savings Bank merged with Chippewa County Savings Bank; although Adams remained on the board of directors, he was no longer president of the institution. In 1926, the bank took over the assets of the Brimley State Bank.

In 1975, the bank moved its offices to their present location at 511 Bingham Avenue in Sault Ste. Marie. Other businesses moved into the ground floor spaces; however, the upper floors remained empty for years.

In 2010, after a few years of financial wrangling, the Adams Building and the next-door Masonic Block were purchased by a developer. Renovations began, with the plan to provide 4,500 square feet of ground-floor commercial space and 24 apartments. The project is known as "Park Place City Center."
