= John Adams School =

- U.S. National Register of Historic Places
- U.S. Historic district – Contributing property
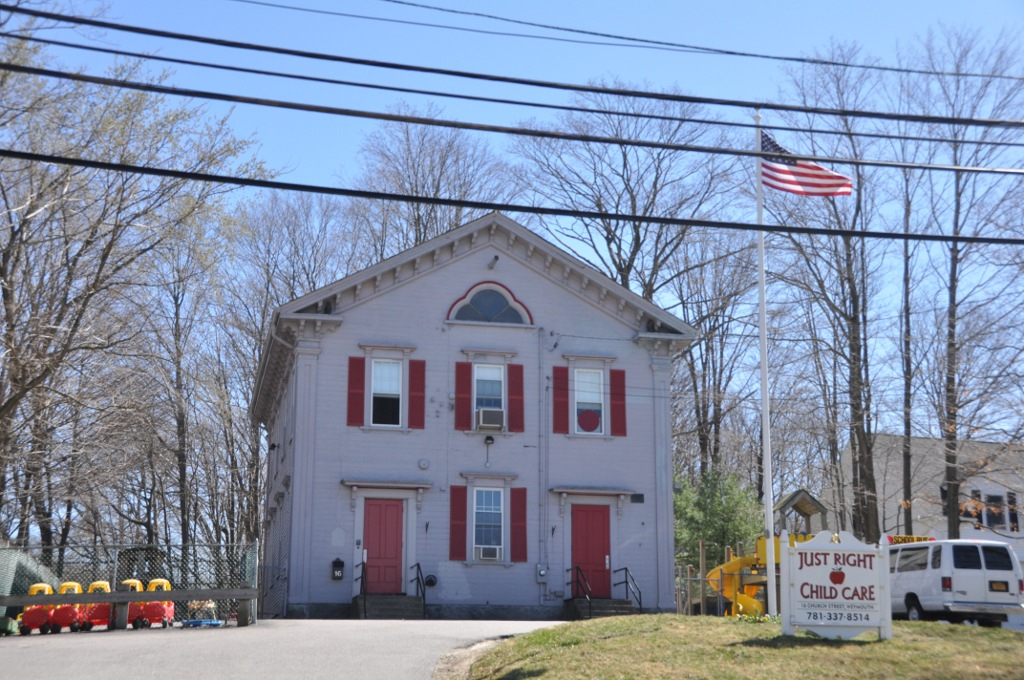

- Location within Massachusetts Location within the United States
- Location: 16 Church Street, Weymouth, Massachusetts
- Coordinates: 42°13′45″N 70°56′40″W
- Built: 1855
- Architectural style: Greek Revival, Italianate
- Part of: Weymouth Meeting House Historic District (ID10001007)
- NRHP reference No.: 85003068

Significant dates
- Added to NRHP: December 5, 1985
- Designated CP: December 13, 2010

The John Adams School is a historic school building in Weymouth, Massachusetts. The Greek Revival/Italianate school building was built in 1855, on the site of Weymouth's first school building (1681). It is Weymouth's oldest surviving school building. It is 2 1/2 stories tall, with a front-facing gable roof that has a bracketed gable. The main facade is three bays wide, with windows that have bracketed surrounds, and a pair of entrances with bracketed cornices above.

The building was listed on the National Register of Historic Places in 1985. It presently houses a daycare center.

== See also ==
- National Register of Historic Places listings in Norfolk County, Massachusetts
