= Adams-Edwards House =

Historic house in North Carolina, United States

- U.S. National Register of Historic Places
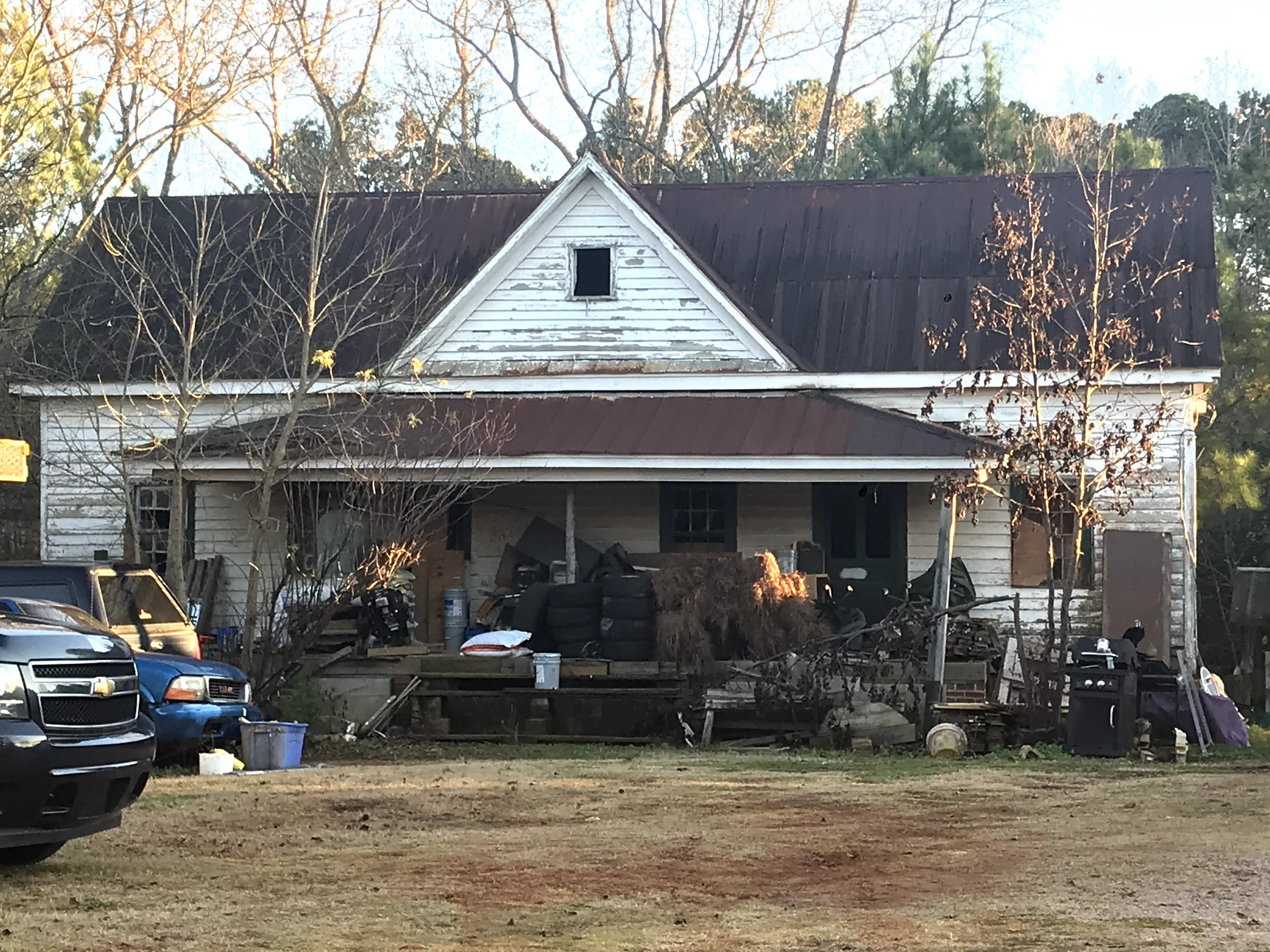

- Location within North Carolina Location within the United States
- Location: 5400 Tryon Rd., near Raleigh, North Carolina
- Coordinates: 35°44′54″N 78°43′53″W
- Area: 3.9 acres (1.6 ha)
- Built: c. 1850, c. 1860, c. 1880, c. 1900
- Architectural style: Greek Revival, Three-room plan house
- MPS: Wake County MPS
- NRHP reference No.: 06001109
- Added to NRHP: December 6, 2006

Adams-Edwards House is a historic home located near Raleigh, Wake County, North Carolina. The original section of the house was built about 1850, and is a single-story, single-pile, side-gabled house with Greek Revival-style design elements. It has a centered front gable, a 3/4-width hip-roofed front porch, and a one-story gabled rear ell. Additions and alterations were made to the original house about 1860, about 1880, and about 1900. Also on the property is a contributing well house (c. 1900).

It was listed on the National Register of Historic Places on December 6, 2006.
