= Amos Adams House =

Historic house in Massachusetts, United States

- U.S. National Register of Historic Places
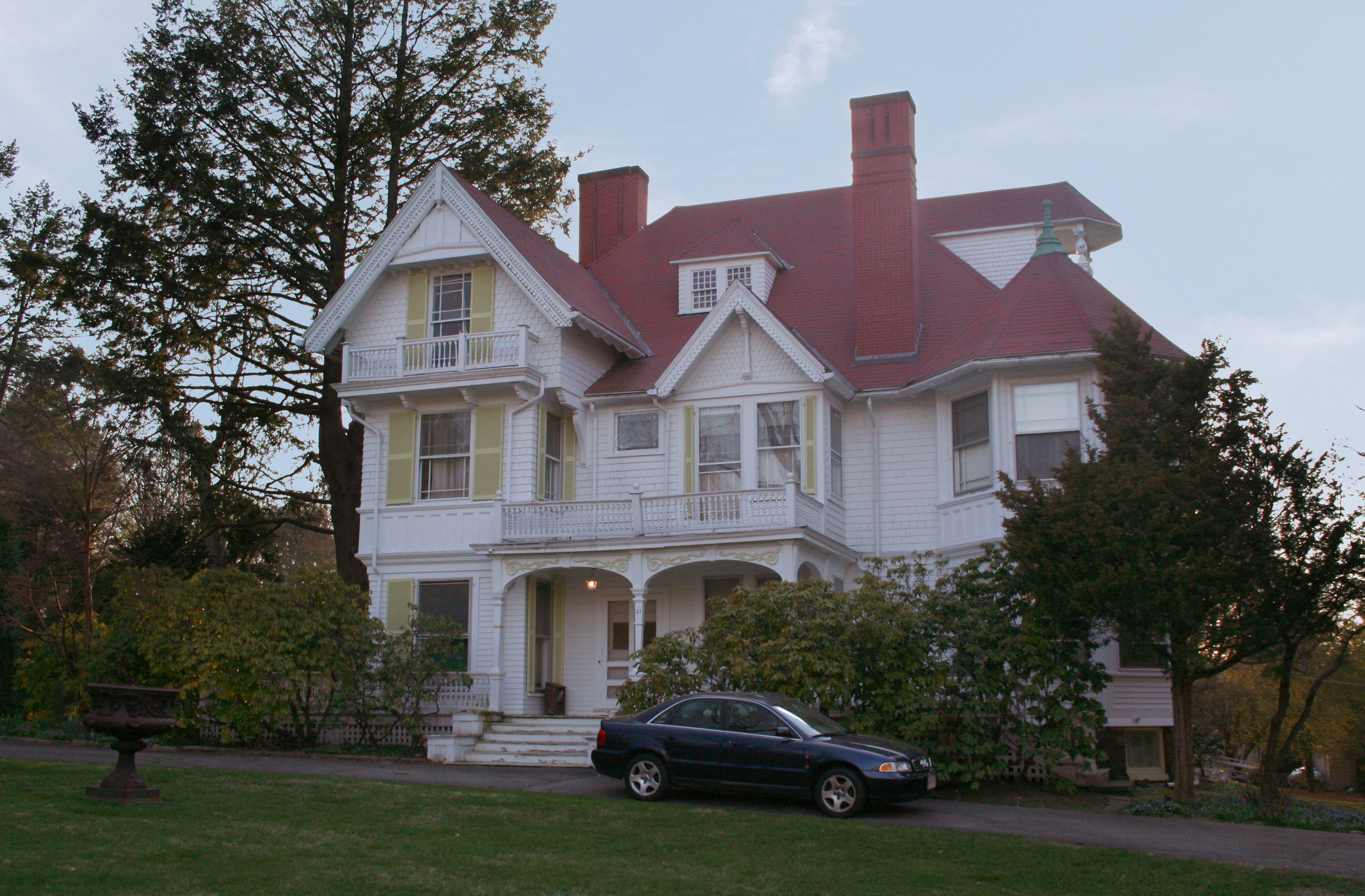

- Location within Massachusetts Location within the United States
- Location: 37 Park Ave., Newton, Massachusetts
- Coordinates: 42°20′44″N 71°11′7″W
- Area: less than one acre
- Built: 1888
- Architectural style: Queen Anne
- MPS: Newton MRA
- NRHP reference No.: 86001767
- Added to NRHP: September 4, 1986

The Amos Adams House is a historic house in the Newton Corner village of Newton, Massachusetts. Built in 1888, it is a prominent local example of Queen Anne architecture. It was listed on the National Register of Historic Places on September 4, 1986.

== Description and history ==
The Amos Adams House stands in a large residential area roughly midway between the villages of Newton Corner and Newton Centre, on the west side of Park Avenue near its junction with Green Park. It is a 2 1/2-story structure, with a tall hip roof and clapboarded exterior. It has asymmetrical massing typical of the style, as well as a variety of projecting gables and porches, an octagonal tower, and tall paneled-brick chimneys. The front facade is divided into roughly three sections, with the tower on the right, a central single-story entry porch with turned posts and balustrade above, and a rectangular projecting section on the left that increases in size to a third-level gable with Stick style woodwork in the gable top and a small balcony on the third level. A small gable section projects above the entrance porch, and a small hip-roof dormer is found in the tall roof above that. Gable ends are typically clad in decorative shingles, and there are paneled sections below windows of the turret and the left projection.

The house was built in 1888, on land that had previously been part of the large estate of Albert Brackett, a prominent local coal and lumber dealer. Brackett sold off portions of his estate in response to increasing development pressures. The house was built for Amos Adams, a businessman who commuted to Boston, a common occurrence in residents of this area.

== See also ==
- National Register of Historic Places listings in Newton, Massachusetts
