= Adams School (Findlay, Ohio) =

- U.S. National Register of Historic Places
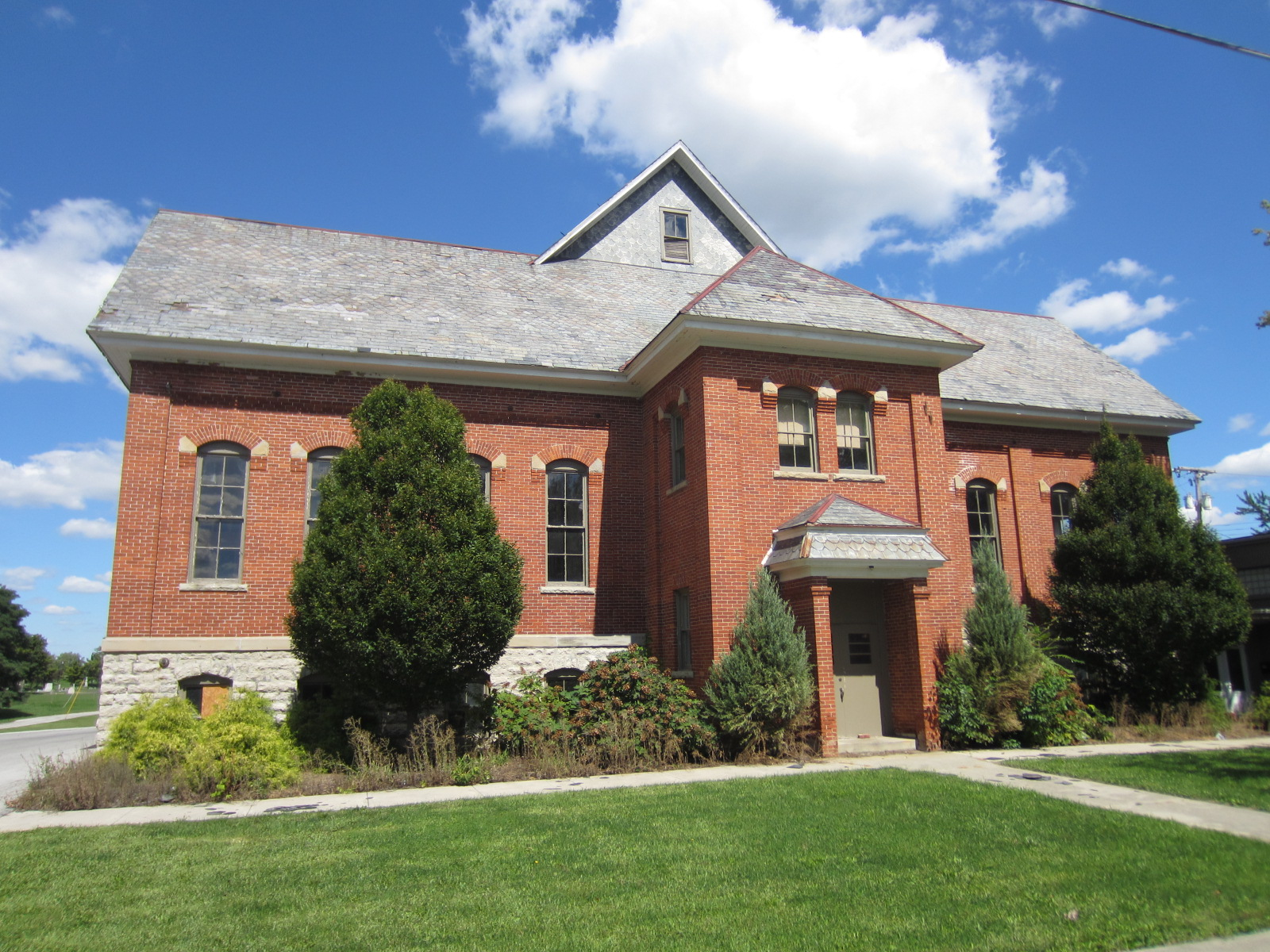
- Front of the school
- Location: Findlay, Ohio
- Coordinates: 41°2′30.87″N 83°39′42.80″W
- Architectural style: Italianate and Colonial Revival
- NRHP reference No.: 04000832
- Added to NRHP: 2004-08-11

The Adams School is a historic school in Findlay, Ohio, United States. Built in 1888, it was listed on the National Register of Historic Places in 2004. It has since been converted into an apartment building.
