= Adams-Matheson House =

Historic house in Georgia, United States

- Adams--Matheson House
- U.S. National Register of Historic Places
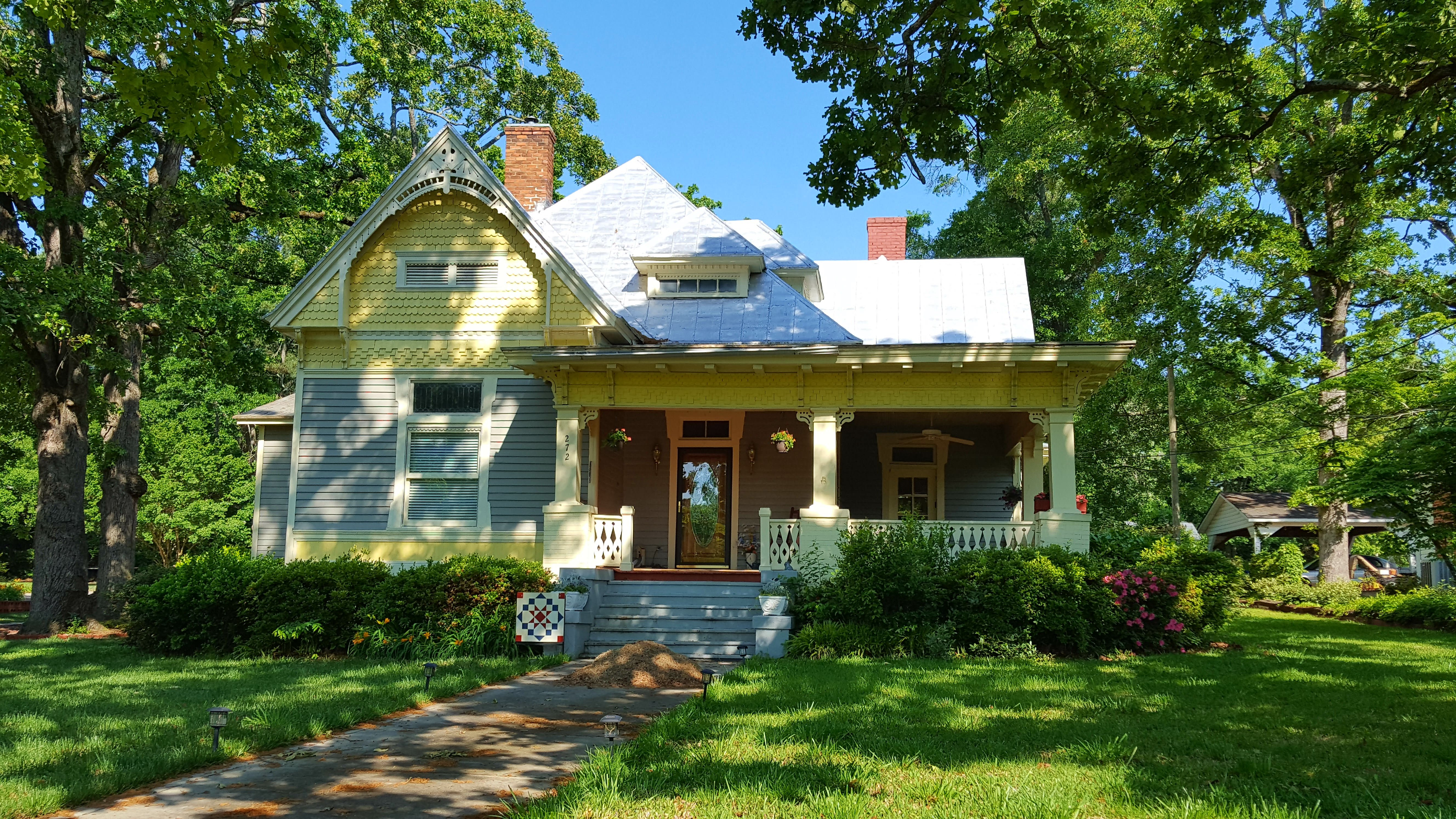

- Location within Georgia Location within the United States
- Location: 116 Athens St. Hartwell, Georgia
- Coordinates: 34°21′06″N 82°56′27″W
- Area: 1 acre (0.40 ha)
- Built: 1900
- Architectural style: Late Victorian, Victorian Eclectic
- MPS: Hartwell MRA
- NRHP reference No.: 86002003
- Added to NRHP: September 11, 1986

The Adams—Matheson House, located at 116 Athens St. in Hartwell, Georgia, was built in 1900. It was listed on the National Register of Historic Places in 1986.

It is a one-story Victorian Eclectic frame house built in 1900 which had later alterations including a Craftsman-influenced porch. It has a large gable on its front facade which is covered with fish-scale shingles and has a cut and turned bargeboard.
