= Adams–Fairview Bonanza Farm =

- U.S. National Register of Historic Places
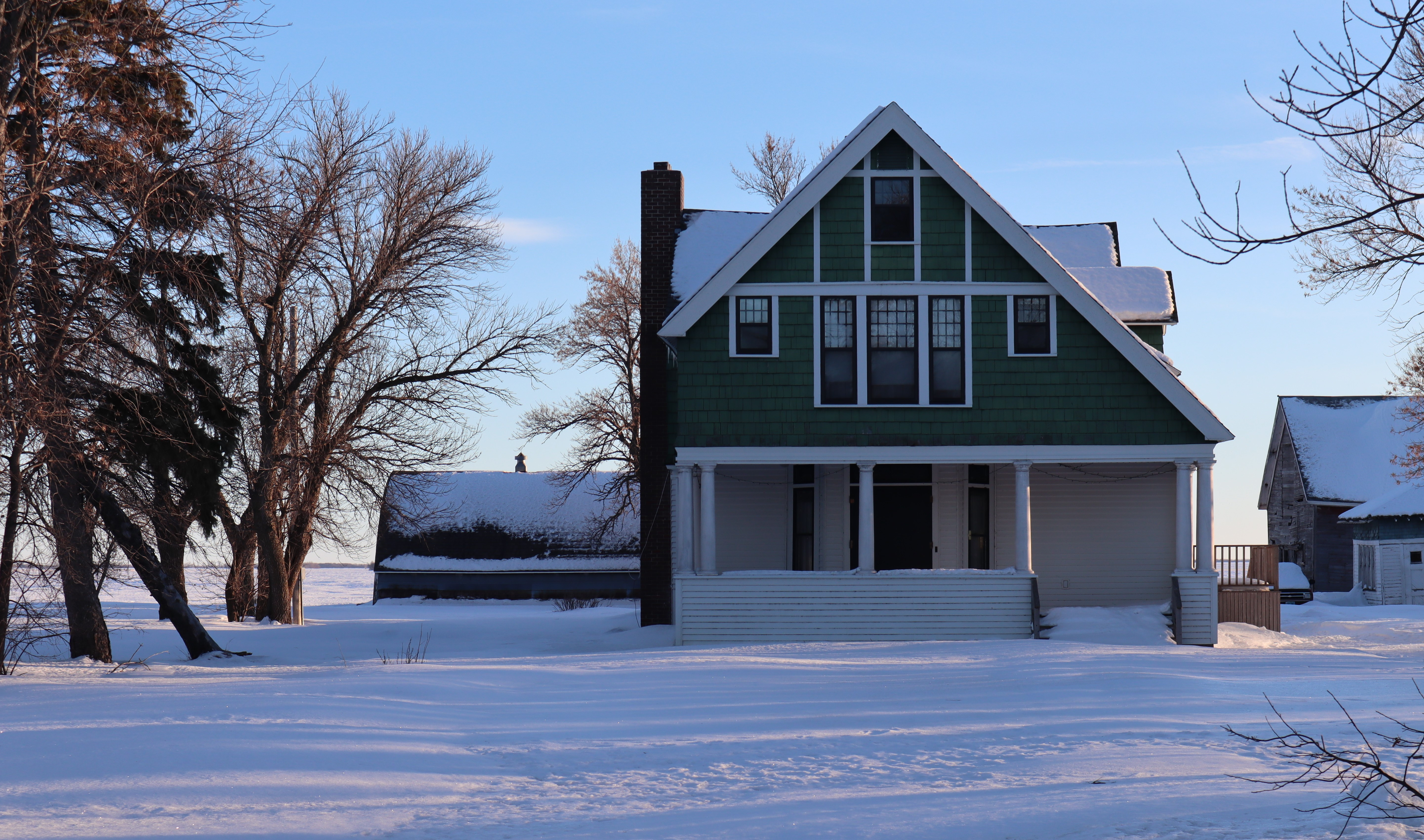
- The farm in early 2023

- Location within North Dakota Location within the United States
- Nearest city: Wahpeton, North Dakota
- Coordinates: 46°13′29″N 96°49′01″W
- Area: 2.5 acres (1.0 ha)
- Built: 1905
- Architectural style: Bungalow, Craftsman
- MPS: Bonanza Farming in North Dakota MPS
- NRHP reference No.: 90001838
- Added to NRHP: November 20, 1990

The Adams–Fairview Bonanza Farm near Wahpeton, North Dakota, is a bonanza farm that was developed in 1905. It was listed on the National Register of Historic Places in 1990.
