= Adams Block =

- U.S. National Register of Historic Places
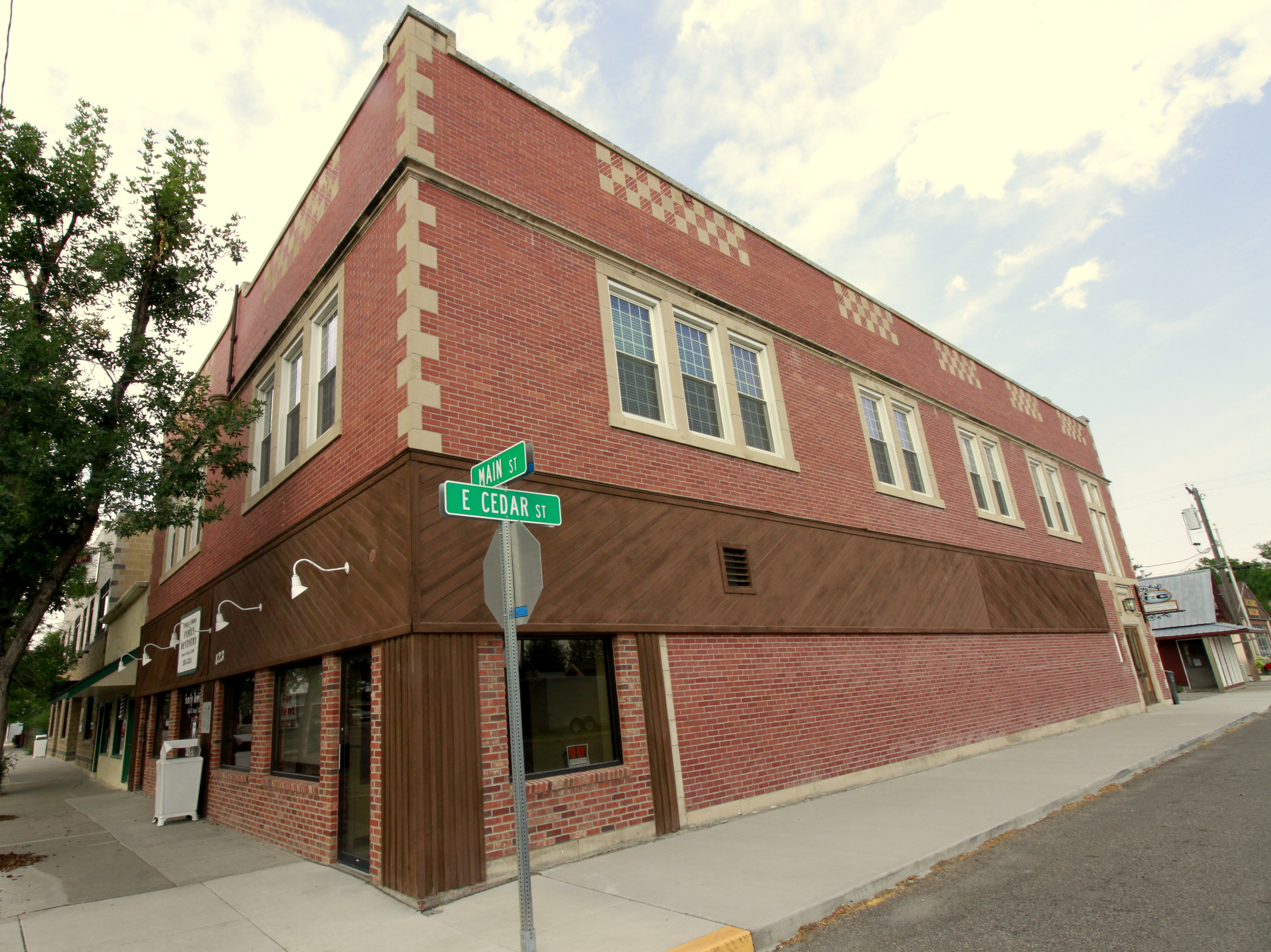

- Location within Montana Location within the United States
- Location: 123 Main St., Three Forks, Montana
- Coordinates: 45°53′36″N 111°33′05″W
- Area: less than one acre
- Built: 1918
- Architectural style: Early Commercial
- NRHP reference No.: 99000597
- Added to NRHP: May 20, 1999

The Adams Block, at 123 Main St. in Three Forks, Montana, was built in 1918. It is an Early Commercial-style building. It was listed on the National Register of Historic Places in 1999.

It is a two-story 50 by 90 feet (15 m × 27 m) brick building which was declared to be "'one of the most modem stores in the state of Montana' upon its completion in 1918."
