= John H. Adams House =

Historic house in North Carolina, United States

- U.S. National Register of Historic Places
- U.S. Historic district – Contributing property
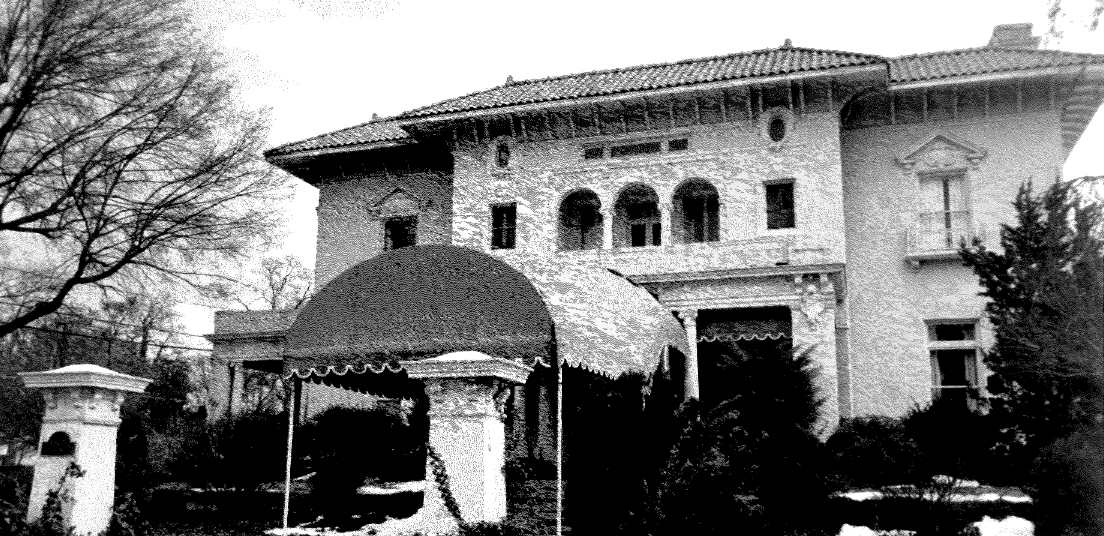

- Location within North Carolina Location within the United States
- Location: 1108 N. Main St., High Point, North Carolina
- Coordinates: 35°58′10″N 80°0′56″W
- Area: less than one acre
- Built: 1918
- Architectural style: Italian Renaissance
- NRHP reference No.: 00001641
- Added to NRHP: January 11, 2001

John H. Adams House, also known as Davis Funeral Home, is a historic home located at High Point, Guilford County, North Carolina. It was built in 1918, and is a two-story, five-bay, stuccoed frame structure in the Italian Renaissance style. It has a low pitched, deck-hipped roof with terra cotta, widely overhanging boxed eaves, and a three-bay recessed upper porch or loggia with semi-circular arches.

It was listed on the National Register of Historic Places in 2001. It is located in the Uptown Suburbs Historic District.
