= John Alma Adams House =

Historic house in Utah, United States

- U.S. National Register of Historic Places
- Location within Utah Location within the United States
- Location: 625 East 200 South, Pleasant Grove, Utah
- Coordinates: 40°21′42″N 111°43′34″W
- Area: less than one acre
- Built: 1877, 1889
- Built by: John A. Adams, William Henry Adams, and Olaf Monson
- MPS: Pleasant Grove Soft-Rock Buildings TR
- NRHP reference No.: 87000825
- Added to NRHP: June 9, 1987

The John Alma Adams House is a historic house located at 625 East Two Hundred South in Pleasant Grove, Utah.

== Description and history ==
It was built with soft-rock exterior walls in 1877, and was renovated and extended in 1889.

It was listed on the National Register of Historic Places on June 9, 1987; and the listing included two contributing buildings.
