= John Adams Homestead-Wellscroft =

Historic house in New Hampshire, United States

- John Adams Homestead/Wellscroft
- U.S. National Register of Historic Places
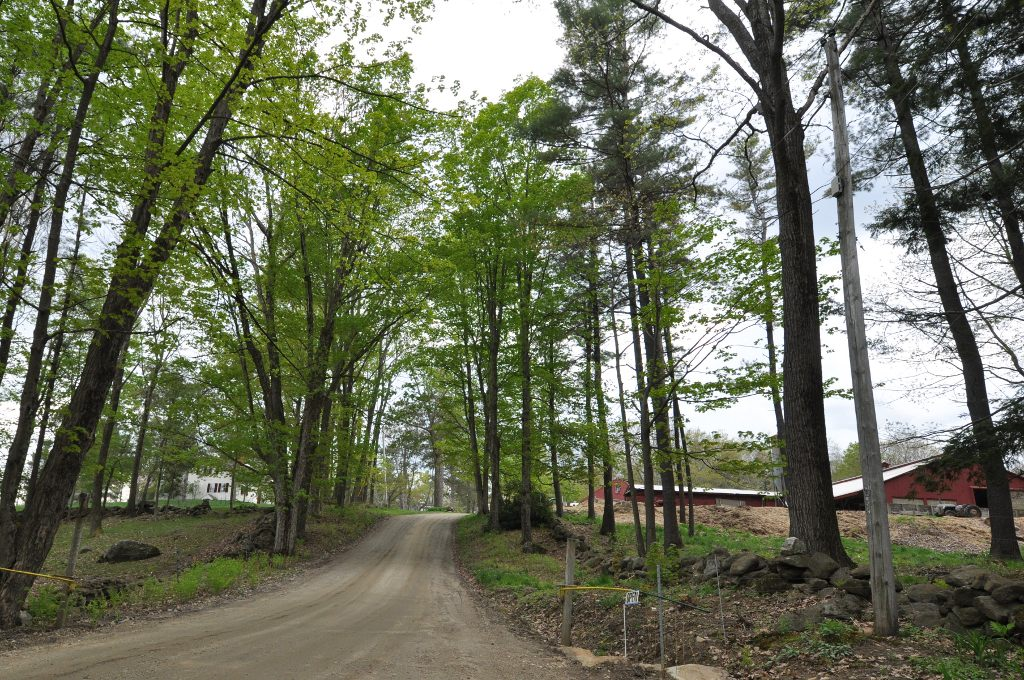

- Location within New Hampshire Location within the United States
- Location: W of Sunset Hill Rd., Harrisville, New Hampshire
- Coordinates: 42°56′54″N 72°9′0″W
- Area: 2 acres (0.81 ha)
- Built: 1773
- Architectural style: Cape cottage
- MPS: Harrisville MRA
- NRHP reference No.: 86003250
- Added to NRHP: January 14, 1988

The John Adams Homestead/Wellscroft is a historic farmstead off West Sunset Hill Road in Harrisville, New Hampshire. The oldest portion of the farm's main house is a 1 1/2-story wood-frame structure built in the 1770s. It is one of the least-altered examples of early Cape style architecture in Harrisville, lacking typical alterations such as the additions of dormers and changes to the window sizes, locations, and shapes. The farmstead, including outbuildings and an area of roughly 2 acres (0.81 ha) distinct from the larger farm property, was listed on the National Register of Historic Places.

== Description and history ==
The John Adams Homestead is located in a rural setting of western Harrisville, on the west side of Sunset Hill Road accessed via a drive north of Wells Lake Road. The main house is a 1 1/2-story wood-frame structure, with a gabled roof, central chimney, and clapboarded exterior. Its main facade is three bays wide, with sash windows on either side of the center entrance. The entrance is topped by a transom window. The gable ends on the sides each have two small sash windows.

The house was probably built in the early 1770s, and is one of Harrisville's oldest surviving buildings. The only notable alteration is to the front door surround, made c. 1825 when an ell was also added to the house. One of the upstairs rooms also has stencilwork on its walls that may be the work of folk artist Moses Eaton, Jr., a Harrisville resident. Among the surviving outbuildings is a barn dating to the early 19th century. The property's name, Wellscroft, derives from an early 20th century summer residence that was built on the property, and torn down in the 1970s.

== See also ==
- National Register of Historic Places listings in Cheshire County, New Hampshire
