= Joseph T. Adams House =

Historic house in Delaware, United States

- U.S. National Register of Historic Places
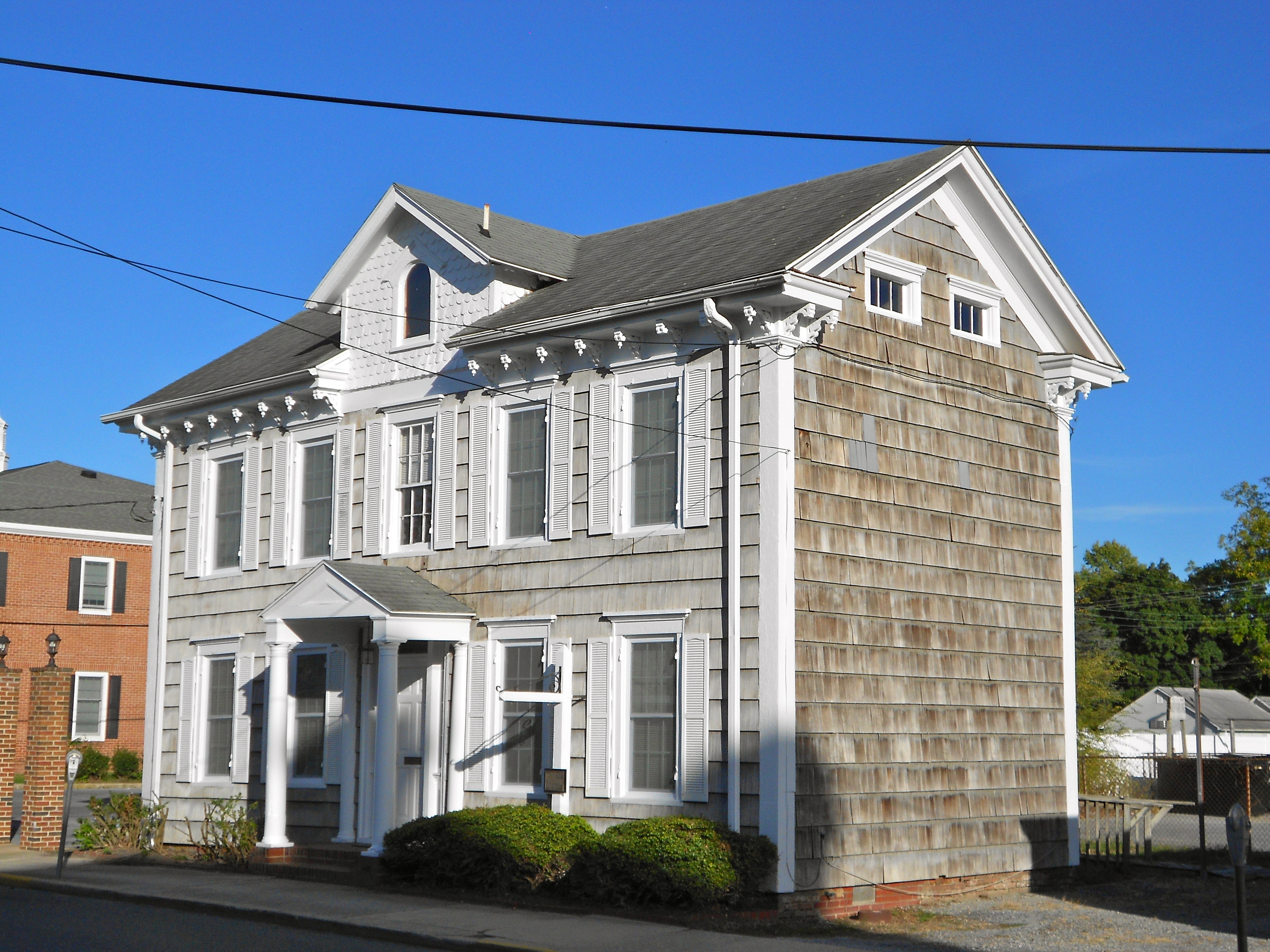

- Location within Delaware Location within the United States
- Location: 12 E. Pine St., Georgetown, Delaware
- Coordinates: 38°41′29″N 75°23′3″W
- Area: 1 acre (0.40 ha)
- Built: c. 1868
- Architectural style: Greek Revival, Italianate
- NRHP reference No.: 98001092
- Added to NRHP: August 28, 1998

Joseph T. Adams House is a historic home located at Georgetown, Sussex County, Delaware. It was built in 1868, and is a two-story, five-bay, shingled frame dwelling in the Greek Revival style. It has a rear ell, gable roof, and cross-gable dormer. It features corner columns and an elaborate Italianate style cornice. In 1957, the house was acquired for the first permanent home for the Georgetown town offices since its establishment in 1791.

Joseph T. Adams (1831-1905) was recorded as working as a clerk on the 1850 and 1860 Census. He was an alderman of the Town of Georgetown from 1873-1876. Ownership of the house passed to his wife, Jane Adams, when he died. When she died in 1914, it passed to their son, William Adams.

The site was added to the National Register of Historic Places in 1998.
