= John A. Adams Farmstead Historic District =

Historic district in Missouri, United States

- U.S. National Register of Historic Places
- U.S. Historic district
- Location within Missouri Location within the United States
- Location: 431 SE Y Highway, near Warrensburg, Missouri
- Coordinates: 38°41′46″N 93°39′58″W
- Area: 80 acres (32 ha)
- Built by: Adams, John Albert
- Architectural style: Gabled-ell farmhouse
- NRHP reference No.: 94000701
- Added to NRHP: July 7, 1994

John A. Adams Farmstead Historic District, also known as Cedarcroft Farm, is a historic home and farm and national historic district located near Warrensburg, Johnson County, Missouri. The district consists of four contributing properties—three contributing buildings and one contributing structure. The buildings are a house (c. 1867-1876), a barn (c. 1867), and a barn (c. 1880). The structure is a system of sewer and drainage tiles and dams constructed beginning in 1875 and which underlays much of the district.

It was listed on the National Register of Historic Places in 1994.
