= 1988 Penn State Nittany Lions football team =

American college football season

1988 Penn State Nittany Lions football
- Conference: Independent
- Record: 5–6
- Head coach: Joe Paterno (23rd season)
- Offensive coordinator: Fran Ganter (5th season)
- Offensive scheme: Pro-style
- Defensive coordinator: Jerry Sandusky (12th season)
- Base defense: 4–3
- Captains: John Greene; Eddie Johnson; Keith Karpinski; Steve Wisniewski
- Home stadium: Beaver Stadium

1988 Major eastern college football independents records
	Conf.					Overall
Team	W		L		T	W		L		T
No. 5 West Virginia $	5	–	0	–	0	11	–	1	–	0
No. 13 Syracuse	5	–	1	–	0	10	–	2	–	0
Pittsburgh	3	–	3	–	0	6	–	5	–	0
Temple	2	–	3	–	0	4	–	7	–	0
Rutgers	2	–	4	–	0	5	–	6	–	0
Penn State	2	–	4	–	0	5	–	6	–	0
Boston College	1	–	5	–	0	3	–	8	–	0
$ – Lambert Trophy Winner; Rankings from AP Poll

1988 NCAA Division I-A independents football records
	Conf.					Overall
Team	W		L		T	W		L		T
No. 1 Notre Dame		–		–		12	–	0	–	0
No. 2 Miami (FL)		–		–		11	–	1	–	0
No. 3 Florida State		–		–		11	–	1	–	0
No. 5 West Virginia		–		–		11	–	1	–	0
Southern Miss		–		–		10	–	2	–	0
No. 13 Syracuse		–		–		10	–	2	–	0
Army		–		–		9	–	3	–	0
Louisville		–		–		8	–	3	–	0
South Carolina		–		–		8	–	4	–	0
Northern Illinois		–		–		7	–	4	–	0
Pittsburgh		–		–		6	–	5	–	0
Memphis State		–		–		6	–	5	–	0
Southwestern Louisiana		–		–		6	–	5	–	0
Rutgers		–		–		5	–	6	–	0
Akron		–		–		5	–	6	–	0
Penn State		–		–		5	–	6	–	0
Tulane		–		–		5	–	6	–	0
Temple		–		–		4	–	7	–	0
Tulsa		–		–		4	–	7	–	0
Boston College		–		–		3	–	8	–	0
Cincinnati		–		–		3	–	8	–	0
East Carolina		–		–		3	–	8	–	0
Navy		–		–		3	–	8	–	0
Virginia Tech		–		–		3	–	8	–	0
Rankings from AP Poll

The 1988 Penn State Nittany Lions football team represented the Pennsylvania State University as an independent during the 1988 NCAA Division I-A football season. Led by 23rd-year head coach Joe Paterno, the Nittany Lions compiled a record of 5–6. Penn State played home games at Beaver Stadium in University Park, Pennsylvania.

== Schedule ==
Date	Time	Opponent	Rank	Site	TV	Result	Attendance	Source
September 10	7:00 p.m.	at Virginia	No. 18	Scott Stadium; Charlottesville, VA		W 42–14	45,000	
September 17	1:00 p.m.	Boston College	No. 16	Beaver Stadium; University Park, PA		W 23–20	84,000	
September 24	1:00 p.m.	Rutgers	No. 15	Beaver Stadium; University Park, PA		L 16–21	85,531	
October 1	7:00 p.m.	at Temple		Veterans Stadium; Philadelphia, PA		W 45–9	66,592	
October 8	12:10 p.m.	Cincinnati^{†}		Beaver Stadium; University Park, PA		W 35–9	85,693	
October 15	7:20 p.m.	Syracuse		Beaver Stadium; University Park, PA (rivalry)	ESPN	L 10–24	85,916	
October 22	2:30 p.m.	at Alabama		Legion Field; Birmingham, AL (rivalry)	CBS	L 3–8	75,808	
October 29	2:40 p.m.	at No. 7 West Virginia		Mountaineer Field; Morgantown, WV (rivalry)	CBS	L 30–51	66,811	
November 5	1:00 p.m.	Maryland		Beaver Stadium; University Park, PA (rivalry)		W 17–10	78,000	
November 12	3:00 p.m.	Pittsburgh		Beaver Stadium; University Park, PA (rivalry)	ESPN	L 7–14	85,701	
November 19	12:00 p.m.	at No. 1 Notre Dame		Notre Dame Stadium; Notre Dame, IN (rivalry)	CBS	L 3–21	59,075	
^{†}Homecoming; Rankings from AP Poll released prior to the game; All times are in Eastern time

== Roster ==
1988 Penn State Nittany Lions football team roster
Players
Coaches
Offense

Pos.	#	Name	Class
QB	12	Tom Bill	So
FB	27	Gary Brown	So
WR	26	David Daniels	So
C	78	Roger Duffy	Jr
FB	11	Sam Gash	So
TE	89	Bob Mrosko	Sr
C		E. J. Sandusky	Fr
WR	79	Dave Szott	Jr
RB	32	Blair Thomas	Jr
WR	5	Michael Timpson	Sr
G	66	Steve Wisniewski	Sr
TE	80	Todd Young	Jr

Defense

Pos.	#	Name	Class
NT	70	Darryl Bullock	Sr
LB	31	Andre Collins	Jr
LB	38	Mark D'Onofrio	Fr
DT	85	Frank Giannetti	So
LB	42	Keith Goganious	Fr
LB	84	Keith Karpinski	Sr
LB	92	Quintus McDonald	Sr

Special teams

Pos.	#	Name	Class
SN	68	Greg Truitt	Sr

Head coach

- Joe Paterno

Coordinators/assistant coaches

- Tom Bradley
- Jim Caldwell
- Craig Cirbus
- Ron Dickerson
- Fran Ganter
- Nick Gasparato
- Joe Sarra
- Jerry Sandusky
- Jim Williams

Legend

- (C) Team captain
- (S) Suspended
- (I) Ineligible
- Injured
- Redshirt

Roster

== NFL draft ==
Six Nittany Lions were drafted in the 1989 NFL draft.

Round	Pick	Overall	Name	Position	Team
2nd	1	29	Steve Wisniewski	Offensive guard	Dallas Cowboys
4th	16	100	Michael Timpson	Wide receiver	New England Patriots
6th	16	155	Quintus McDonald	Linebacker	Indianapolis Colts
6th	21	160	Gary Wilkerson	Defensive back	Cleveland Browns
9th	21	244	Bob Mrosko	Tight end	Houston Oilers
11th	3	282	Keith Karpinski	Linebacker	Detroit Lions
