= 1988 Virginia Tech Hokies football team =

American college football season

1988 Virginia Tech Hokies football
- Conference: Independent
- Record: 3–8
- Head coach: Frank Beamer (2nd season)
- Offensive coordinator: Steve Marshall (1st season)
- Offensive scheme: Pro-style
- Defensive coordinator: Mike Clark (1st season)
- Base defense: 4–4
- Home stadium: Lane Stadium

1988 NCAA Division I-A independents football records
	Conf.					Overall
Team	W		L		T	W		L		T
No. 1 Notre Dame		–		–		12	–	0	–	0
No. 2 Miami (FL)		–		–		11	–	1	–	0
No. 3 Florida State		–		–		11	–	1	–	0
No. 5 West Virginia		–		–		11	–	1	–	0
Southern Miss		–		–		10	–	2	–	0
No. 13 Syracuse		–		–		10	–	2	–	0
Army		–		–		9	–	3	–	0
Louisville		–		–		8	–	3	–	0
South Carolina		–		–		8	–	4	–	0
Northern Illinois		–		–		7	–	4	–	0
Pittsburgh		–		–		6	–	5	–	0
Memphis State		–		–		6	–	5	–	0
Southwestern Louisiana		–		–		6	–	5	–	0
Rutgers		–		–		5	–	6	–	0
Akron		–		–		5	–	6	–	0
Penn State		–		–		5	–	6	–	0
Tulane		–		–		5	–	6	–	0
Temple		–		–		4	–	7	–	0
Tulsa		–		–		4	–	7	–	0
Boston College		–		–		3	–	8	–	0
Cincinnati		–		–		3	–	8	–	0
East Carolina		–		–		3	–	8	–	0
Navy		–		–		3	–	8	–	0
Virginia Tech		–		–		3	–	8	–	0
Rankings from AP Poll

The 1988 Virginia Tech Hokies football team represented Virginia Polytechnic Institute and State University as an independent during the 1988 NCAA Division I-A football season. Led by second-year head coach Frank Beamer, the Hokies finished with an overall record of 3–8, playing home games at Lane Stadium in Blacksburg, Virginia.

The season opened with a 40–7 road loss to No. 4 Clemson before Virginia Tech earned its first victory of the year with a 27–16 home win over East Carolina. Four consecutive losses through September and October included a shutout at the Carrier Dome against Syracuse, a 26–24 near-miss against No. 8 South Carolina in which the Hokies led 24–17 entering the fourth quarter, and a road game at Southern Miss in which a young Brett Favre threw three second-half touchdown passes to erase a 13–7 Virginia Tech lead. A 41–14 road victory at Cincinnati in October snapped the losing streak, and the team rallied for a 27–6 season-closing win over James Madison — a performance that reportedly came together after reports surfaced that Beamer's job security was at risk.

Sophomore quarterback Will Furrer started ten of eleven games, completing 128 of 279 passes for 1,384 yards and six touchdowns while absorbing 33 sacks as the offensive line developed. Halfback Ralph Brown emerged as the most dependable runner in the backfield, carrying 140 times for 514 yards at 3.7 yards per attempt and four touchdowns to lead the team in both rushing yards and scoring. Jon Jeffries added 383 yards and two touchdowns on 98 carries before injury limited him to nine games, while also contributing 16 receptions for 130 yards and a touchdown in the passing game. Sophomore Myron Richardson led the receiving corps with 36 catches for 583 yards at a 16.2-yard average and one score. Tight end Brian McCall contributed 16 receptions for 169 yards and two touchdowns, and kicker Chris Kinzer paced the scoring with 56 points on 12-of-18 field goals and a perfect 20-of-20 on extra points — his long of 44 yards. Virginia Tech averaged 295.1 yards of total offense per game and scored 176 points across the season.

Defensively, the Hokies were led by nose tackle Horacio Moronta, who finished with a team-high 81 total tackles, seven sacks for 51 yards, and three tackles for loss. Linebacker Scott Hill matched Moronta's sack total with seven of his own for 57 yards, adding 76 total tackles and a team-high nine quarterback hurries. Linebacker Jock Jones contributed 73 tackles, one sack, two interceptions for 49 yards, and blocked two kicks — including a punt he returned for a touchdown. Cornerback John Granby led the team with four interceptions for 27 yards, while linebacker Leslie Bailey added three picks for 33 yards and returned one for a touchdown. As a unit, the defense recorded 30 sacks for 241 yards and intercepted 19 passes for 197 yards and two touchdowns, while surrendering 264 points and 3,529 total yards on the season.

== Schedule ==
Date	Time	Opponent	Site	Result	Attendance	Source
September 3	12:00 p.m.	at No. 4 Clemson	Memorial Stadium; Clemson, SC	L 7–40	78,714	
September 10	1:00 p.m.	East Carolina	Lane Stadium; Blacksburg, VA	W 27–16	37,200	
September 17	8:00 p.m.	at Southern Miss	M. M. Roberts Stadium; Hattiesburg, MS	L 13–35	17,135	
September 24	1:30 p.m.	at Syracuse	Carrier Dome; Syracuse, NY	L 0–35	41,118	
October 1	1:00 p.m.	No. 7 West Virginia	Lane Stadium; Blacksburg, VA (rivalry)	L 10–22	50,231	
October 8	1:00 p.m.	No. 8 South Carolina	Lane Stadium; Blacksburg, VA	L 24–26	42,845	
October 15	7:00 p.m.	at Cincinnati	Nippert Stadium; Cincinnati, OH	W 41–14	11,217	
October 29	1:00 p.m.	Virginia	Lane Stadium; Blacksburg, VA (rivalry)	L 10–16	50,329	
November 5	7:00 p.m.	at Louisville	Cardinal Stadium; Louisville, KY	L 3–13	21,107	
November 12	7:00 p.m.	at No. 5 Florida State	Doak Campbell Stadium; Tallahassee, FL	L 14–41	50,910	
November 19	1:00 p.m.	James Madison	Lane Stadium; Blacksburg, VA	W 27–6	18,753	
Rankings from AP Poll released prior to the game; All times are in Eastern time

== Game Summaries ==
=== No. 4 Clemson ===
Team	1	2	3	4	Total
Virginia Tech	0	7	0	0	7
• No. 4 Clemson	7	24	6	3	40

- Date: September 3
- Location: Memorial Stadium, Clemson, SC
- Game start: 12:08 p.m. EST
- Elapsed time: 3:17
- Game attendance: 80,500
- Game weather: Partly cloudy, 73 °F (23 °C), Winds SE 5 mph (8.0 km/h)

Scoring summary
1	03:22	CU	Joe Henderson 41-yard rush (Rusty Seyle kick)	CU 7–0
2	14:53	CU	Terry Allen 15-yard rush (Rusty Seyle kick)	CU 14–0
2	09:33	VT	Rich Fox 5-yard rush (Chris Kinzer kick)	CU 14–7
2	06:07	CU	Rodney Williams 4-yard rush (Rusty Seyle kick)	CU 21–7
2	02:05	CU	Tracy Johnson 15-yard rush (Chris Gardocki kick)	CU 28–7
2	00:16	CU	Chris Gardocki 38-yard field goal	CU 31–7
3	03:47	CU	Joe Henderson 19-yard rush (Rusty Seyle kick failed)	CU 37–7
4	12:26	CU	Chris Gardocki 43-yard field goal	CU 40–7

Box Score

Virginia Tech (0–1) opened the 1988 season with a 40–7 loss to No. 4 Clemson (1–0) on September 3 at Memorial Stadium. The Hokies fell behind early and were unable to recover, trailing 31–7 at halftime and failing to score in the second half.

Tech's lone scoring drive came midway through the second quarter. Trailing 14–0, the Hokies assembled a 12-play, 67-yard possession that featured short completions by quarterback Will Furrer and inside runs by Rich Fox and Malcolm Blacken. Fox capped the drive with a 5-yard touchdown run at the 9:33 mark, and Chris Kinzer added the extra point to cut the deficit to 14–7.

Virginia Tech finished with 214 total yards of offense, including 98 rushing and 116 passing, and recorded 21 first downs. Furrer completed 17 of 36 passes for 116 yards and 2 interceptions, while being sacked seven times. Fox led the rushing attack with 43 yards and a touchdown on 14 carries, and Blacken added 40 yards on 7 attempts. Lamar Smith and Brian McCall combined for 50 receiving yards on 6 catches.

Defensively, Scott Rice led the Hokies with 9 total tackles, followed by Jimmy Whitten with 8 and Horacio Moronta with 7. Jock Jones blocked a punt and recorded a tackle for loss, while Sean Lucas and Archie Hopkins added stops behind the line. Virginia Tech forced one fumble and held Clemson to 3-of-12 on third down conversions.

Despite the lopsided score, the Hokies showed flashes of defensive resilience and special teams execution. The game marked the debut of Furrer as starting quarterback and the first career touchdown for Rich Fox.

=== East Carolina ===
Team	1	2	3	4	Total
East Carolina	0	7	3	6	16
• Virginia Tech	7	10	3	7	27

- Date: September 10
- Location: Lane Stadium, Blacksburg, VA
- Game start: 1:01 p.m. EST
- Elapsed time: 2:43
- Game attendance: 37,200
- Game weather: Sunny, 73 °F (23 °C), Winds SW 5 mph (8.0 km/h)

Scoring summary
1	08:32	VT	Jon Jeffries 3-yard rush (Chris Kinzer kick)	VT 7–0
2	08:55	ECU	Walter Wilson 17-yard pass from Travis Hunter (Robb Imperato kick)	Tied 7–7
2	04:27	VT	Jon Jeffries 5-yard rush (Chris Kinzer kick)	VT 14–7
2	00:09	VT	Chris Kinzer 28-yard field goal	VT 17–7
3	06:42	VT	Chris Kinzer 22-yard field goal	VT 20–7
3	04:01	ECU	Robb Imperato 29-yard field goal	VT 20–10
4	08:06	VT	Rich Fox 2-yard rush (Chris Kinzer kick)	VT 27–10
4	03:11	ECU	BoJack Davenport 12-yard pass from Charlie Libretto (Charlie Libretto pass failed)	VT 27–16

Box Score

Virginia Tech (1–1) earned its first win of the 1988 season with a 27–16 victory over East Carolina (1–1) on September 10 at Lane Stadium. The Hokies scored in every quarter and never trailed, using a strong rushing attack and opportunistic defense to control the game.

Tech opened the scoring with a 3-yard touchdown run by Jon Jeffries at the 8:32 mark of the first quarter, capping a 14-play, 80-yard drive. After East Carolina tied the game early in the second, Jeffries added a second touchdown — a 5-yard run — to finish a 10-play, 67-yard possession. Chris Kinzer extended the lead to 17–7 with a 28-yard field goal just before halftime.

In the third quarter, Kinzer added a 22-yard field goal to make it 20–10. Virginia Tech's final score came early in the fourth, when Rich Fox powered in from 2 yards out to cap a short-field drive set up by a long punt return and interception. East Carolina added a late touchdown but failed on the two-point conversion.

Virginia Tech totaled 434 yards of offense, including 276 rushing and 158 passing, and recorded 27 first downs. Jeffries led the ground game with 101 yards and 2 touchdowns on 21 carries, while Malcolm Blacken added 68 yards on 10 attempts. Quarterback Will Furrer completed 13 of 18 passes for 158 yards with no interceptions. Myron Richardson caught 4 passes for 59 yards, and Brian McCall added 42 yards on 3 receptions.

Defensively, the Hokies intercepted four passes and recorded two sacks. Jock Jones returned two interceptions for 49 yards, while Scott Rice and Will Gowin added picks. Scott Hill led the team with 5 tackles and 2 sacks, and Tim Boitnott broke up two passes. Virginia Tech held East Carolina to 294 total yards, including just 114 rushing, and limited the Pirates to 2-of-7 on third down conversions.

=== Southern Miss ===
Team	1	2	3	4	Total
Virginia Tech	10	3	0	0	13
• Southern Miss	0	14	14	7	35

- Date: September 17
- Location: M. M. Roberts Stadium, Hattiesburg, MS
- Game start: 7:02 p.m. EST
- Elapsed time: 2:41
- Game attendance: 17,135
- Game weather: Overcast/Rain, 81 °F (27 °C), Calm winds

Scoring summary
1	12:46	VT	Don Stokes blocked punt recovery in end zone (Chris Kinzer kick)	VT 7–0
1	06:02	VT	Chris Kinzer 28-yard field goal	VT 10–0
2	14:55	USM	Alfred Williams 9-yard pass from Brett Favre (Chris Seroka kick)	VT 10–7
2	08:08	VT	Chris Kinzer 44-yard field goal	VT 13–7
2	00:51	USM	Michael Jackson 22-yard pass from Brett Favre (Chris Seroka kick)	USM 14–13
3	10:25	USM	Simmie Carter 60-yard blocked punt return (Chris Seroka kick)	USM 21–13
3	06:45	USM	James Henry 44-yard punt return (Chris Seroka kick)	USM 28–13
4	01:46	USM	Eugene Rowell 8-yard pass from Brett Favre (Chris Seroka kick)	USM 35–13

Box Score

Virginia Tech (1–2) dropped its first road game of the 1988 season with a 35–13 loss to Southern Miss (2–1) on September 17 at Roberts Stadium. The Hokies led 13–7 midway through the second quarter but were undone by two Favre touchdown passes that erased the lead before halftime, two special teams scores in the third quarter, and a third Favre touchdown pass in the fourth.

Tech opened the scoring just 2:14 into the game when Don Stokes recovered a blocked punt in the end zone for a touchdown. Later in the first quarter, Chris Kinzer added a 28-yard field goal to give the Hokies a 10–0 lead. After Southern Miss responded with a touchdown pass from Favre, Virginia Tech answered with a 44-yard field goal by Kinzer to extend the lead to 13–7. Favre struck again with a 22-yard touchdown pass just before halftime, giving Southern Miss a 14–13 lead at the break.

The game turned in the third quarter, when Southern Miss scored on a 60-yard blocked punt return by Simmie Carter and a 44-yard punt return by James Henry — to push the lead to 28–13. Favre added his third touchdown pass with 1:46 remaining in the fourth quarter to seal the win.

Virginia Tech totaled 194 yards of offense, including 77 rushing and 117 passing, and recorded 14 first downs. Will Furrer completed 9 of 24 passes for 95 yards, while Cam Young added 22 yards on 2 completions in relief. Jon Jeffries led the rushing attack with 61 yards on 18 carries and added 16 receiving yards. Nick Cullen caught 4 passes for 33 yards, and Myron Richardson added a 20-yard reception.

Defensively, the Hokies were led by Horacio Moronta with 13 total tackles and a sack, followed by Jock Jones with 10 and Randy Cockrell with 9. Don Stokes recovered a fumble and returned a blocked punt for a touchdown, while Scott Hill and Al Chamblee each recorded sacks. Will Gowin and Sean Lucas recovered fumbles, and Stokes added a pass breakup.

Virginia Tech intercepted Favre once and held Southern Miss to 226 total yards, including just 78 rushing. However, the Hokies allowed three passing touchdowns and two special teams scores, while failing to score in the second half.

=== Syracuse ===
Team	1	2	3	4	Total
Virginia Tech	0	0	0	0	0
• Syracuse	7	14	14	0	35

- Date: September 24
- Location: Carrier Dome, Syracuse, NY
- Game start: 1:30 p.m. EST
- Elapsed time: 2:56
- Game attendance: 41,118
- Game weather: Indoors, 72 °F (22 °C), No wind

Scoring summary
1	12:10	SU	Daryl Johnston 6-yard rush (Kevin J. Greene kick)	SU 7–0
2	08:00	SU	Rob Moore 44-yard pass from Todd Philcox (Kevin J. Greene kick)	SU 14–0
2	03:15	SU	Rob Moore 31-yard pass from Todd Philcox (Kevin J. Greene kick)	SU 21–0
3	12:36	SU	Rob Moore 10-yard pass from Todd Philcox (Kevin J. Greene kick)	SU 28–0
3	06:11	SU	Todd Philcox 7-yard pass from Michael Owens (Kevin J. Greene kick)	SU 35–0

Box Score

Virginia Tech (1–3) was shut out by Syracuse (2–1) 35–0 on September 24, 1988, at the Carrier Dome. The Hokies trailed 21–0 at halftime and failed to score despite reaching Syracuse territory multiple times. The loss marked Virginia Tech's second shutout of the season and its third straight defeat.

Tech's best scoring opportunity came late in the second quarter, when Will Furrer led a 10-play, 58-yard drive to the Syracuse 33. Chris Kinzer attempted a 50-yard field goal with 0:35 remaining, but the kick missed wide left. The Hokies reached the red zone once in the third quarter but failed to convert on fourth down from the Syracuse 10.

Virginia Tech totaled 224 yards of offense, including 63 rushing and 161 passing, and recorded 14 first downs. Phil Bryant led the rushing attack with 46 yards on 4 carries, while Jon Jeffries added 39 receiving yards and 20 rushing yards. Furrer completed 15 of 33 passes for 145 yards and 4 interceptions, and Cam Young added 16 yards on 2 completions in relief. Nick Cullen led all receivers with 5 catches for 47 yards.

Defensively, Bobby Martin recorded 8 tackles and returned an interception 14 yards in the second quarter. Horacio Moronta and Scott Hill each registered a sack, and Al Chamblee broke up a pass. Virginia Tech forced one turnover and held Syracuse to 4-of-14 on third down conversions, but allowed four passing touchdowns — three of them to Rob Moore — and 379 total yards. Future Dallas Cowboys fullback Daryl Johnston scored the game's opening touchdown on a 6-yard run in the first quarter.

=== No. 7 West Virginia ===
Team	1	2	3	4	Total
• No. 7 West Virginia	9	3	3	7	22
Virginia Tech	0	3	7	0	10

- Date: October 1
- Location: Lane Stadium, Blacksburg, VA
- Game start: 1:00 p.m. EST
- Elapsed time: 2:42
- Game attendance: 50,231
- Game weather: Sunny, 73 °F (23 °C), Winds SW 5 mph (8.0 km/h)

Scoring summary
1	09:49	WVU	Craig Taylor 8-yard rush (Charlie Baumann kick failed)	WVU 6–0
1	03:00	WVU	Charlie Baumann 19-yard field goal	WVU 9–0
2	14:20	WVU	Charlie Baumann 37-yard field goal	WVU 12–0
2	07:05	VT	Chris Kinzer 28-yard field goal	WVU 12–3
3	11:09	WVU	Charlie Baumann 29-yard field goal	WVU 15–3
3	02:29	VT	Jock Jones blocked punt recovery in end zone (Chris Kinzer kick)	WVU 15–10
4	10:11	WVU	Anthony Brown 5-yard rush (Charlie Baumann kick)	WVU 22–10

Box Score

Virginia Tech (1–4) dropped its fourth straight game with a 22–10 loss to No. 7 West Virginia (5–0) on October 1, 1988, at Lane Stadium. The Hokies trailed 12–0 early but closed the gap to 15–10 late in the third quarter before surrendering a final touchdown in the fourth.

West Virginia opened the scoring with an 8-yard touchdown run by Craig Taylor at the 9:49 mark of the first quarter. After a 19-yard field goal made it 9–0, the Mountaineers added a 37-yard kick early in the second quarter to extend the lead to 12–0. Virginia Tech responded with a 28-yard field goal by Chris Kinzer at 7:05 of the second quarter, capping a 4-play, 7-yard drive set up by a fumble recovery.

In the third quarter, West Virginia pushed the lead to 15–3 with a 29-yard field goal. Virginia Tech answered with its only touchdown of the game when Jock Jones returned a blocked punt for a score at the 2:29 mark. Kinzer's extra point cut the deficit to 15–10. The Hokies had a chance to take the lead early in the fourth but turned the ball over on downs at the West Virginia 32. The Mountaineers sealed the game with a 5-yard touchdown run by Anthony Brown with 10:11 remaining.

Virginia Tech totaled 194 yards of offense, including 107 rushing and 87 passing, and recorded 8 first downs. Ralph Brown led the ground game with 73 yards on 19 carries, while Myron Richardson had a 50-yard reception and 71 all-purpose yards. Will Furrer completed 5 of 21 passes for 39 yards and an interception, while Jeff Roberts added a 50-yard completion on his only attempt. The Hokies converted just 2 of 15 third downs and were 0-for-2 on fourth down.

Defensively, Scott Hill led the team with 12 tackles, and Horacio Moronta and Bobby Martin each added 9. Jock Jones returned a blocked punt for a touchdown and recorded a tackle for loss. Sean Lucas and John Granby each intercepted a pass, and Al Chamblee and Scott Hill combined for five tackles behind the line. Virginia Tech forced four fumbles and held West Virginia to no passing touchdowns, but allowed 518 total yards, including 313 rushing.

=== No. 8 South Carolina ===
Team	1	2	3	4	Total
• No. 8 South Carolina	3	7	7	9	26
Virginia Tech	7	14	3	0	24

- Date: October 8
- Location: Lane Stadium, Blacksburg, VA
- Game start: 1:00 p.m. EST
- Elapsed time: 3:26
- Game attendance: 42,845
- Game weather: Cloudy, 50 °F (10 °C), Winds NW 10 mph (16 km/h)

Scoring summary
1	07:34	SC	Collin Mackie 24-yard field goal	SC 3–0
1	01:56	VT	Brian McCall 15-yard pass from Will Furrer (Chris Kinzer kick)	VT 7–3
2	07:08	SC	Mike Dingle 53-yard pass from Todd Ellis (Collin Mackie kick)	SC 10–7
2	02:17	VT	Roger Brown 47-yard interception return (Chris Kinzer kick)	VT 14–10
2	01:22	VT	Leslie Bailey 19-yard interception return (Chris Kinzer kick)	VT 21–10
3	14:47	SC	Robert Brooks 98-yard kickoff return (Collin Mackie kick)	VT 21–17
3	11:48	VT	Chris Kinzer 43-yard field goal	VT 24–17
4	13:39	SC	Collin Mackie 28-yard field goal	VT 24–20
4	11:23	SC	Collin Mackie 50-yard field goal	SC 23–24
4	06:43	SC	Collin Mackie 23-yard field goal	SC 26–24

Box Score

Virginia Tech (1–5) dropped its fifth straight game with a 26–24 loss to No. 8 South Carolina (6–0) on October 8, 1988, at Lane Stadium. The Hokies led 21–10 late in the second quarter and 24–17 entering the fourth, but surrendered three field goals and committed five interceptions in a back-and-forth contest.

Tech opened the scoring with a 15-yard touchdown pass from Will Furrer to Brian McCall at the 1:56 mark of the first quarter, after South Carolina had taken a 3–0 lead on a Collin Mackie 24-yard field goal. After the Gamecocks retook the lead on a 53-yard touchdown pass from Todd Ellis to Mike Dingle, Virginia Tech responded with two defensive scores in the final three minutes of the half. Roger Brown returned an interception 47 yards for a touchdown at 2:17, and Leslie Bailey added a 19-yard pick-six just 55 seconds later to give the Hokies a 21–10 lead.

South Carolina opened the third quarter with a 98-yard kickoff return by Robert Brooks to cut the lead to 21–17. Virginia Tech answered with a 43-yard field goal by Chris Kinzer at 11:48, but missed two other attempts from 46 and 51 yards. In the fourth quarter, Collin Mackie converted field goals of 28, 50, and 23 yards to give South Carolina the win.

Virginia Tech totaled 217 yards of offense, including 74 rushing and 143 passing, and recorded 14 first downs. Ralph Brown led the ground game with 55 yards on 18 carries, while Phil Bryant added 40 yards on 12 attempts. Furrer completed 17 of 40 passes for 143 yards, 1 touchdown, and 3 interceptions. Myron Richardson led all receivers with 7 catches for 65 yards, and Nick Cullen added 32 yards on 3 receptions.

Defensively, the Hokies intercepted five passes: Roger Brown and Leslie Bailey each returned one for a touchdown, while Mitch Dove, Sean Lucas, and Jock Jones added picks in the second half. Lucas and Jones also recorded 9 tackles apiece, and Horacio Moronta added 6 stops and 2 sacks. Scott Hill and Randy Cockrell each contributed tackles for loss. Virginia Tech held South Carolina to 0 rushing yards on 27 attempts and forced five turnovers.

Despite the defensive effort, Virginia Tech committed five turnovers of its own and was penalized 14 times for 123 yards. The Hokies converted just 3 of 19 third downs and failed to score in the fourth quarter.

=== Cincinnati ===
Team	1	2	3	4	Total
• Virginia Tech	3	7	17	14	41
Cincinnati	0	7	0	7	14

- Date: October 15
- Location: Nippert Stadium, Cincinnati, OH
- Game start: 7:01 p.m. EST
- Elapsed time: 2:40
- Game attendance: 11,217
- Game weather: Calm & Cool, 70 °F (21 °C), Winds SW 8 mph (13 km/h)

Scoring summary
1	08:35	VT	Chris Kinzer 27-yard field goal	VT 3–0
2	13:19	VT	Ralph Brown 24-yard rush (Chris Kinzer kick)	VT 10–0
2	07:51	UC	Roosevelt Mukes 12-yard pass from Glenn Farkas (Phil Insalaco kick)	VT 10–7
3	10:42	VT	Ralph Brown 2-yard rush (Chris Kinzer kick)	VT 17–7
3	05:25	VT	Ralph Brown 3-yard rush (Chris Kinzer kick)	VT 24–7
3	00:51	VT	Chris Kinzer 21-yard field goal	VT 27–7
4	12:17	VT	Jeff Roberts 27-yard pass from Will Furrer (Chris Kinzer kick)	VT 34–7
4	09:53	UC	Steve Sanders 19-yard pass from Don Hoog (Phil Insalaco kick)	VT 34–14
4	05:35	VT	Greg Daniels 5-yard pass from Will Furrer (Chris Kinzer kick)	VT 41–14

Box Score

Virginia Tech (2–5) earned its second win of the season with a 41–14 victory over Cincinnati (2–4) on October 14, 1988, at Nippert Stadium. The Hokies controlled the game with 36:40 of possession, 91 offensive plays, and a season-high 396 total yards.

Tech opened the scoring with a 27-yard field goal by Chris Kinzer at 8:35 of the first quarter. In the second, Ralph Brown broke free for a 24-yard touchdown run to make it 10–0. Cincinnati answered with a 12-yard touchdown pass, but Virginia Tech responded with 17 unanswered points in the third quarter. Brown scored twice more — on runs of 2 and 3 yards — and Kinzer added a 21-yard field goal to extend the lead to 27–7.

In the fourth quarter, Will Furrer threw touchdown passes of 27 yards to Jeff Roberts and 5 yards to Greg Daniels. Cincinnati added a late score on a 19-yard pass, but Virginia Tech closed out the game with a 10-play, 33-yard touchdown drive.

The Hokies rushed for 278 yards on 71 attempts and passed for 118 yards, finishing with 21 first downs and 5-of-6 red zone conversions. Brown led the offense with 125 rushing yards and 3 touchdowns on 27 carries. Furrer completed 11 of 19 passes for 118 yards and 2 touchdowns, while Myron Richardson caught 5 passes for 58 yards and added 38 return yards. Jeff Roberts and Greg Daniels each caught a touchdown.

Defensively, Virginia Tech recorded 5 sacks and forced four turnovers. John Granby intercepted a pass and returned it 27 yards, while Archie Hopkins, Randy Cockrell, and Steve Mitchem each recovered fumbles. Horacio Moronta led the pass rush with 2 sacks for 30 yards, and Scott Hill added a sack and 6 tackles. Jock Jones led the team with 9 tackles and a forced fumble, and Don Stokes recorded 2 tackles for loss.

Virginia Tech held Cincinnati to 195 total yards, including just 53 rushing, and limited the Bearcats to 3-of-16 on third down conversions.

=== Virginia ===
Team	1	2	3	4	Total
• Virginia	3	10	3	0	16
Virginia Tech	3	7	0	0	10

- Date: October 29
- Location: Lane Stadium, Blacksburg, VA
- Game start: 1:01 p.m. EST
- Elapsed time: 2:42
- Game attendance: 50,329
- Game weather: Clear Sunny, 52 °F (11 °C), Winds WNW 8 mph (13 km/h)

Scoring summary
1	08:17	VT	Chris Kinzer 25-yard field goal	VT 3–0
1	03:33	UVA	Mark Inderlied 35-yard field goal	Tied 3–3
2	14:50	UVA	Mark Inderlied 36-yard field goal	UVA 6–3
2	10:55	VT	Brian McCall 2-yard pass from Will Furrer (Chris Kinzer kick)	VT 10–6
2	00:31	UVA	Herman Moore 9-yard pass from Shawn Moore (Mark Inderlied kick)	UVA 13–10
3	01:54	UVA	Mark Inderlied 34-yard field goal	UVA 16–10

Box Score

Virginia Tech (2–6) fell to in-state rival Virginia (4–4) by a score of 16–10 on October 29, 1988, at Lane Stadium. The Hokies led 10–6 midway through the second quarter but were shut out over the final 40 minutes and committed three turnovers in a game dominated by missed opportunities.

Tech opened the scoring with a 25-yard field goal by Chris Kinzer at 8:17 of the first quarter, capping a 10-play, 66-yard drive. After Virginia tied the game with a 35-yard field goal, the Cavaliers added another kick early in the second quarter to take a 6–3 lead. Virginia Tech responded with a 7-play, 84-yard drive capped by a 2-yard touchdown pass from Will Furrer to Brian McCall at 10:55. Virginia answered just before halftime with a 9-yard touchdown pass from Shawn Moore to Herman Moore, giving the Cavaliers a 13–10 lead.

In the third quarter, Virginia extended the lead to 16–10 with a 34-yard field goal. The Hokies missed two field goals — from 41 and 26 yards — and turned the ball over on downs at the Virginia 25 with 1:09 remaining. Furrer's final pass was intercepted at the Virginia 40 with 36 seconds left.

Virginia Tech totaled 424 yards of offense, including 132 rushing and 292 passing, and recorded 18 first downs. Furrer completed 17 of 40 passes for 292 yards, 1 touchdown, and 3 interceptions. Myron Richardson led all receivers with 129 yards on 5 catches, followed by Nick Cullen with 94 yards on 4 receptions. Ralph Brown added 37 receiving yards and 14 rushing yards, while Phil Bryant led the ground game with 40 yards on 11 carries.

Defensively, Don Stokes led the Hokies with 11 tackles and a pass breakup. Jock Jones recorded 10 tackles and a sack, while Al Chamblee and Horacio Moronta each added a sack and multiple stops. Roger Brown intercepted a pass, and Will Gowin broke up two passes. Virginia Tech recorded four sacks and held Virginia to 70 rushing yards on 40 attempts.

Despite outgaining the Cavaliers 424–351 and winning time of possession, the Hokies converted just 2 of 5 red zone chances and committed three turnovers.

=== Louisville ===
Team	1	2	3	4	Total
Virginia Tech	0	3	0	0	3
• Louisville	0	3	7	3	13

- Date: November 5
- Location: Cardinal Stadium, Louisville, KY
- Game start: 7:00 p.m. EST
- Elapsed time: 2:37
- Game attendance: 21,107
- Game weather: Overcast/Rain, 45 °F (7 °C), Winds W 12 mph (19 km/h)

Scoring summary
2	12:23	VT	Chris Kinzer 21-yard field goal	VT 3–0
2	03:53	UL	Ron Bell 52-yard field goal	Tied 3–3
3	10:25	UL	Deon Booker 1-yard rush (Ron Bell kick)	UL 10–3
4	01:16	UL	Ron Bell 25-yard field goal	UL 13–3

Box Score

Virginia Tech (2–7) fell to Louisville (7–3) by a score of 13–3 on November 5, 1988, at Cardinal Stadium. The Hokies outgained the Cardinals 221–206 and recorded more first downs, but committed four turnovers and failed to score in the second half.

Tech opened the scoring with a 21-yard field goal by Chris Kinzer at 12:23 of the second quarter, capping a 7-play, 16-yard drive set up by a short field. Louisville tied the game with a 52-yard field goal by Ron Bell at 3:53 of the second quarter. In the third quarter, Deon Booker scored the game's only touchdown on a 1-yard run at 10:25, and Bell added a 25-yard field goal with 1:16 remaining in the fourth to seal the win.

Virginia Tech totaled 221 yards of offense, including 73 rushing and 148 passing, and recorded 15 first downs. Cam Young completed 15 of 23 passes for 137 yards and an interception, while Jeff Roberts added 11 yards on his only attempt. Myron Richardson led all receivers with 48 yards on 4 catches, and Jeff Roberts added a 25-yard reception. Ralph Brown rushed for 30 yards on 14 carries, and Phil Bryant added 32 yards on 14 attempts.

Defensively, Scott Hill and Jimmy Whitten led the Hokies with 12 tackles each, and Virginia Tech recorded five sacks for 45 yards. Al Chamblee, Bryan Campbell, Randy Cockrell, and Jock Jones each contributed tackles for loss, and Leslie Bailey intercepted a pass. Sean Lucas broke up a pass and added a quarterback hurry, while Horacio Moronta and Don Stokes combined for 15 tackles.

Virginia Tech converted 5 of 18 third downs and 2 of 2 fourth downs, but fumbled three times and failed to score on two red zone trips.

=== No. 5 Florida State ===
Team	1	2	3	4	Total
Virginia Tech	0	7	0	7	14
• No. 5 Florida State	0	14	20	7	41

- Date: November 12
- Location: Doak Campbell Stadium, Tallahassee, FL
- Game start: 7:00 p.m. EST
- Elapsed time: 3:05
- Game attendance: 50,910
- Game weather: Clear, 74 °F (23 °C), Winds SE 5 mph (8.0 km/h)

Scoring summary
2	14:54	FSU	Sammie Smith 11-yard rush (Richie Andrews kick)	FSU 7–0
2	12:47	VT	Jon Jeffries 44-yard pass from Will Furrer (Chris Kinzer kick)	Tied 7–7
2	04:36	FSU	Dayne Williams 3-yard rush (Richie Andrews kick)	FSU 14–7
3	09:17	FSU	Marion Butts 1-yard rush (Richie Andrews kick)	FSU 21–7
3	05:46	FSU	Bruce LaSane 7-yard pass from Chip Ferguson (Richie Andrews kick)	FSU 28–7
3	03:05	FSU	Lawrence Dawsey 36-yard pass from Peter Tom Willis (Richie Andrews kick failed)	FSU 34–7
4	12:28	FSU	Sammie Smith 25-yard rush (Richie Andrews kick)	FSU 41–7
4	05:10	VT	Lamar Smith 2-yard rush (Chris Kinzer kick)	FSU 41–14

Box Score

Facing its third top 10 opponent of the year, Virginia Tech (2–8) fell to No. 5 Florida State (9–1) by a score of 41–14 on November 12, 1988, at Doak Campbell Stadium. The Hokies trailed 14–7 at halftime but surrendered three touchdowns in the third quarter and were outgained 520–276 overall.

Florida State opened the scoring with an 11-yard touchdown run by Sammie Smith at 14:54 of the second quarter. Virginia Tech answered with a 44-yard touchdown pass from Will Furrer to Jon Jeffries at 12:47, but the Seminoles responded with a 3-yard touchdown run by Dayne Williams to take a 14–7 lead into halftime.

In the third quarter, Florida State scored three times: Marion Butts ran for a 1-yard touchdown, Chip Ferguson threw a 7-yard TD pass to Bruce LaSane, and Peter Tom Willis added a 36-yard scoring strike to Lawrence Dawsey. Smith scored again in the fourth quarter on a 25-yard run, and Virginia Tech closed the scoring with a 2-yard touchdown run by Lamar Smith at 5:10.

Virginia Tech totaled 276 yards of offense, including 177 rushing and 99 passing, and recorded 15 first downs. Furrer completed 8 of 21 passes for 99 yards, 1 touchdown, and 2 interceptions. Jeffries led all receivers with 44 yards and a touchdown, while Myron Richardson added 27 yards on 3 catches. Ralph Brown rushed for 48 yards on 12 carries, and Phil Bryant added 31 yards on 4 attempts.

Defensively, Scott Hill recorded 8 tackles and 2 sacks, while Al Chamblee added a sack and 3 quarterback hurries. John Granby intercepted a pass, and Jimmy Whitten forced a fumble. Virginia Tech recorded 3 sacks and 10 quarterback pressures, but allowed 245 rushing yards and 275 passing yards.

Virginia Tech converted just 2 of 13 third downs and committed 7 penalties for 56 yards.

=== James Madison ===
Team	1	2	3	4	Total
James Madison	0	6	0	0	6
• Virginia Tech	7	0	13	7	27

- Date: November 19
- Location: Lane Stadium, Blacksburg, VA
- Game start: 1:00 p.m. EST
- Elapsed time: 2:43
- Game attendance: 18,753
- Game weather: Overcast, 46 °F (8 °C), Calm winds

Scoring summary
1	05:46	JMU	Tim Garritty 20-yard field goal	JMU 3–0
1	01:10	JMU	Tim Garritty 32-yard field goal	JMU 6–0
2	07:53	VT	Chris Kinzer 41-yard field goal	JMU 6–3
2	01:04	VT	Chris Kinzer 33-yard field goal	Tied 6–6
3	10:06	VT	Myron Richardson 44-yard pass from Will Furrer (Chris Kinzer kick)	VT 13–6
4	14:19	VT	Tom Hall fumble return (Chris Kinzer kick)	VT 20–6
4	08:03	VT	Ralph Brown 3-yard rush (Chris Kinzer kick)	VT 27–6

Box Score

Virginia Tech closed the 1988 season with a 27–6 win over James Madison (5–5) on November 19 at Lane Stadium, holding the Dukes scoreless after the first quarter and finishing the year on a positive note in what had been a difficult campaign.

The game followed a week of speculation about head coach Frank Beamer's future, which reportedly motivated the team. According to the Daily Press, rumors that Beamer might be fired "sparked" the Hokies to a focused and physical performance, especially on defense.

James Madison took the early lead on Tim Garritty field goals of 20 and 32 yards in the first quarter to go up 6–0. Virginia Tech answered in the second quarter with Chris Kinzer field goals of 41 and 33 yards, sending the teams to halftime tied at 6–6. Will Furrer hit Myron Richardson with a 44-yard touchdown pass in the third quarter to give Virginia Tech its first lead at 13–6. Tom Hall recovered a fumble for a touchdown early in the fourth, and Ralph Brown capped the scoring with a 3-yard run to close out the 27–6 final.

Defensively, the Hokies forced four turnovers — including interceptions by Roger Brown and Mitch Dove — and recovered two fumbles. Scott Hill led the team with 11 tackles and a sack, while Don Stokes added 9 tackles and a forced fumble. Al Chamblee and Bryan Campbell each recorded a sack, and Jock Jones contributed 7 tackles and a quarterback hurry. Virginia Tech held James Madison to 205 total yards and just 2-of-13 on third down conversions.

== Roster ==
1988 Virginia Tech Hokies football team roster
Players
Coaches
Offense

Pos.	#	Name	Class
QB	9	Tom Zban	Fr
QB	8	Cam Young	Jr
QB	13	Rodd Wooten	Fr
QB	2	Will Furrer	Fr
QB	12	Chris Baucia	So
RB	27	Jon Jeffries	So
RB	28	Lamar Smith	So
RB	3	Ralph Brown	So
RB	33	Tony Kennedy	Fr
FB	43	Rich Fox	Jr
FB	11	Malcolm Blacken	Sr
FB	29	Phil Bryant	Fr
WR	1	Jeff Roberts	Sr
WR	22	Myron Richardson	Jr
WR	24	Taron Page	Fr
WR	47	Marcus Mickel	Fr
WR	14	Greg Lassiter	Fr
WR	26	Danny Eddy	Jr
WR	48	Nick Cullen	So
WR	82	Frank Mooney	Fr
WR	20	Karl Borden	So
TE	81	Ken Barefoot	Jr
TE	80	Brian McCall	Jr
TE	94	Ron Davidson	Fr
TE	85	Greg Daniels	Fr
TE	89	Rich Saunders	So
OT	61	Jay Foran	Fr
OT	53	Glenn Watts	So
OT	71	Marc Verniel	Fr
OT	55	Rob Vaughan	So
OT	54	Vliktor Vall	So
OT	74	John Rehme	Fr
OT	79	Skip Pavlik	Jr
OT	70	Todd Grantham	Sr
OT	64	Jimmy Bryson	So
OT	77	Mark Briscoe	So
OT	57	William Boatwright	Fr
OT	69	Eugene Chung	Fr
G	76	Chris Matheny	So
G	52	Chris Henderson	Jr
G	60	Tom Hall	Jr
G	56	Steve Hale	Sr
G	62	Christ Holt	Fr
G	75	Stephan Holloway	Fr
G	73	Ernie Davis	Jr
G	86	Don Davis	Fr
DL	97	Al Chamblee	So
DL	99	David Wimmer	Fr
DL	83	Rich Williams	So
DL	96	Jimmy Whitten	So
DL	91	Anthony Pack	Fr
DL	95	Matt Jefferson	Fr
DL	50	Todd Brown	So
DL	92	Bryan Campbell	Fr
DL	67	Bo Cothran	Jr
LB	40	Jock Jones	Jr
LB	46	Brian Williams	Fr
LB	34	Jason Wilson	Fr
LB	32	Don Stokes	Jr
LB	21	Sieve Mitchem	Sr
LB	90	Bobby Martin	Jr
LB	5	Sean Lucas	Jr
LB	37	Archie Hopkins	So
LB	88	Darwin Herdman	So
LB	59	James Hargove	Fr
LB	87	Chad Grube	So
LB	42	Shon Grantz	Fr
LB	45	Roger Garland	Fr
LB	31	Tim Boitnott	So
LB	44	Leslie Bailey	Jr
DB	41	Damien Russell	Fr
DB	38	Scott Rice	Jr
DB	49	Dave Hackbirth	Jr
DB	17	Brad King	So
DB	35	John Granby	So
DB	19	Will Gowin	Jr
DB	18	Bo Campbell	Fr
DB	6	Roger Brown	Jr
DB	23	Mitch Dove	Jr
DB	16	Jeff Doly	Fr
DB	41	Damien Russell	Fr
DB	41	Damien Russell	Fr

Defense

Pos.	#	Name	Class
DL	99	David Wimmer	Fr
DL	83	Rich Williams	So
DL	96	Jimmy Whitten	So
DL	91	Anthony Pack	Fr
DL	95	Matt Jefferson	Fr
DL	50	Todd Brown	So
DL	92	Bryan Campbell	Fr
DL	67	Bo Cothran	Jr
DL	89	Rich Saunders	So
LB	40	Jock Jones	Jr
LB	46	Brian Williams	Fr
LB	34	Jason Wilson	Fr
LB	32	Don Stokes	Jr
LB	21	Sieve Mitchem	Sr
LB	90	Bobby Martin	Jr
LB	5	Sean Lucas	Jr
LB	37	Archie Hopkins	So
LB	88	Darwin Herdman	So
LB	59	James Hargove	Fr
LB	87	Chad Grube	So
LB	42	Shon Grantz	Fr
LB	45	Roger Garland	Fr
LB	31	Tim Boitnott	So
LB	44	Leslie Bailey	Jr
DB	41	Damien Russell	Fr
DB	38	Scott Rice	Jr
DB	49	Dave Hackbirth	Jr
DB	17	Brad King	So
DB	35	John Granby	So
DB	19	Will Gowin	Jr
DB	18	Bo Campbell	Fr
DB	6	Roger Brown	Jr
DB	23	Mitch Dove	Jr
DB	16	Jeff Doly	Fr

Special teams

Pos.	#	Name	Class
K	4	Chris Kinzer	Sr
K	7	Mickey Thomas	Fr
K	30	Scott Freund	Fr
P	15	Kelly Fitzgerald	Fr
P	25	Steve Grabeel	Fr
P	16	Jeff Doly	Fr

Head coach

- Frank Beamer

Coordinators/assistant coaches

{{{asst_coach}}}

Legend

- (C) Team captain
- (S) Suspended
- (I) Ineligible
- Injured
- Redshirt
