= 1988 Pittsburgh Panthers football team =

American college football season

1988 Pittsburgh Panthers football
- Conference: Independent
- Record: 6–5
- Head coach: Mike Gottfried (3rd season)
- Offensive coordinator: Mike Dickens (2nd season)
- Offensive scheme: Multiple pro-style
- Defensive coordinator: John Fox (3rd season)
- Base defense: 4–3
- Home stadium: Pitt Stadium

1988 Major eastern college football independents records
	Conf.					Overall
Team	W		L		T	W		L		T
No. 5 West Virginia $	5	–	0	–	0	11	–	1	–	0
No. 13 Syracuse	5	–	1	–	0	10	–	2	–	0
Pittsburgh	3	–	3	–	0	6	–	5	–	0
Temple	2	–	3	–	0	4	–	7	–	0
Rutgers	2	–	4	–	0	5	–	6	–	0
Penn State	2	–	4	–	0	5	–	6	–	0
Boston College	1	–	5	–	0	3	–	8	–	0
$ – Lambert Trophy Winner; Rankings from AP Poll

1988 NCAA Division I-A independents football records
	Conf.					Overall
Team	W		L		T	W		L		T
No. 1 Notre Dame		–		–		12	–	0	–	0
No. 2 Miami (FL)		–		–		11	–	1	–	0
No. 3 Florida State		–		–		11	–	1	–	0
No. 5 West Virginia		–		–		11	–	1	–	0
Southern Miss		–		–		10	–	2	–	0
No. 13 Syracuse		–		–		10	–	2	–	0
Army		–		–		9	–	3	–	0
Louisville		–		–		8	–	3	–	0
South Carolina		–		–		8	–	4	–	0
Northern Illinois		–		–		7	–	4	–	0
Pittsburgh		–		–		6	–	5	–	0
Memphis State		–		–		6	–	5	–	0
Southwestern Louisiana		–		–		6	–	5	–	0
Rutgers		–		–		5	–	6	–	0
Akron		–		–		5	–	6	–	0
Penn State		–		–		5	–	6	–	0
Tulane		–		–		5	–	6	–	0
Temple		–		–		4	–	7	–	0
Tulsa		–		–		4	–	7	–	0
Boston College		–		–		3	–	8	–	0
Cincinnati		–		–		3	–	8	–	0
East Carolina		–		–		3	–	8	–	0
Navy		–		–		3	–	8	–	0
Virginia Tech		–		–		3	–	8	–	0
Rankings from AP Poll

The 1988 Pittsburgh Panthers football team represented the University of Pittsburgh as an independent during the 1988 NCAA Division I-A football season.

== Schedule ==
Date	Time	Opponent	Rank	Site	TV	Result	Attendance	Source
September 3	7:00 p.m.	Northern Iowa		Pitt Stadium; Pittsburgh, PA		W 59–10	35,755	
September 17	7:00 p.m.	No. 18 Ohio State		Pitt Stadium; Pittsburgh, PA	ESPN	W 42–10	56,500	
September 24	12:00 p.m.	No. 11 West Virginia	No. 16	Pitt Stadium; Pittsburgh, PA (Backyard Brawl)	JP Sports	L 10–31	55,978	
October 1	12:00 p.m.	at Boston College		Alumni Stadium; Chestnut Hill, MA	JP Sports	L 31–34	32,000	
October 8	7:00 p.m.	No. 5 Notre Dame		Pitt Stadium; Pittsburgh, PA (rivalry)	ESPN	L 20–30	56,500	
October 15	1:30 p.m.	Temple		Pitt Stadium; Pittsburgh, PA		W 42–7	32,832	
October 22	1:30 p.m.	Navy^{†}		Pitt Stadium; Pittsburgh, PA		W 52–6	34,230	
November 5	12:00 p.m.	Rutgers		Pitt Stadium; Pittsburgh, PA	JP Sports	W 20–10	20,051	
November 12	3:30 p.m.	at Penn State		Beaver Stadium; University Park, PA (rivalry)	ESPN	W 14–7	85,701	
November 19	1:00 p.m.	at NC State		Carter–Finley Stadium; Raleigh, NC	JP Sports	L 3–14	39,300	
December 3	4:30 p.m.	at No. 18 Syracuse		Carrier Dome; Syracuse, NY (rivalry)	ESPN	L 7–14	49,860	
^{†}Homecoming; Rankings from AP Poll released prior to the game; All times are in Eastern time

== Coaching staff ==
1988 Pittsburgh Panthers football staff
Coaching staff: Mike Gottfried – Head coach; Jack Harbaugh – Assistant head coach/tight ends; Mike Dickens – Offensive coordinator/quarterbacks; John Fox – Defensive coordinator/secondary; Tommie Liggins – Run coordinator/running backs; Steve Coury – Wide receivers; Frank D'Alonzo – Defensive line; Bill Meyers – Offensive line; Scott O'Brien – Special teams; Sal Sunseri – Linebackers	Support staff: Alex Kramer – Administrative assistant; Bud Ratliff – Recruiting coordinator; Paul "Rocky" Alt – Graduate assistant; John Cervino – Graduate assistant; Bill D'Ottavio – Graduate assistant; Frank Gansz Jr. – Graduate assistant; Skip Peete – Graduate assistant	Strength and conditioning staff: Buddy Morris – Strength coordinator; Ray Oliver – Conditioning

== Roster ==
1988 Pittsburgh Panthers football team roster
Players
Coaches
Offense

Pos.	#	Name	Class
OL	69	Dan Anderson	Fr
OL	73	Bill Cherpak	So
FB	44	Jeff Christy	So
RB	32	Glenn Deveaux	Fr
OL	72	Chris Goetz	Jr
OT	62	Roman Matusz	Jr
OT	71	Tom Ricketts	Sr
C	55	Bryan Schoch	So
G	77	Mark Stepnoski	Sr
QB	10	Alex Van Pelt	Fr
RB	29	Adam Walker	Jr
WR	2	Reggie Williams	Jr

Defense

Pos.	#	Name	Class
DL	96	Richard Allen	Fr
DB	23	Dave Coleman	Fr
DB	31	Dan Crossman	Jr
DE	92	Burt Grossman	Sr
DL	90	Mark Gunn	So
CB	25	Cornell Holloway	Sr
LB	48	Ricardo McDonald	Fr
LB	55	Jerry Olsavsky	Sr
DB	5	Louis Riddick	So
DT	98	Tony Siragusa	Sr
DL	89	Tom Sims	Jr
DL	91	Carnel Smith	Jr
DE	93	Marc Spindler	So

Special teams

Pos.	#	Name	Class
P	25	Brian Greenfield	So
K	4	Jeff Van Horne	Jr

Head coach

- Mike Gottfried

Coordinators/assistant coaches

Legend

- (C) Team captain
- (S) Suspended
- (I) Ineligible
- Injured
- Redshirt

== Team players drafted into the NFL ==
Player	Position	Round	Pick	NFL club
Burt Grossman	Defensive end	1	8	San Diego Chargers
Tom Ricketts	Guard	1	24	Pittsburgh Steelers
Mark Stepnoski	Center	3	57	Dallas Cowboys
Vernon Kirk	Tight end	9	242	Los Angeles Rams
Cornell Holloway	Defensive back	10	256	Cincinnati Bengals
Brandon Derry	Linebacker	10	258	Pittsburgh Steelers
