= 1988 Tulsa Golden Hurricane football team =

American college football season

1988 Tulsa Golden Hurricane football
- Conference: Independent
- Record: 4–7
- Head coach: David Rader (1st season)
- Defensive coordinator: Bob Brush (2nd season)
- Home stadium: Skelly Stadium

1988 NCAA Division I-A independents football records
	Conf.					Overall
Team	W		L		T	W		L		T
No. 1 Notre Dame		–		–		12	–	0	–	0
No. 2 Miami (FL)		–		–		11	–	1	–	0
No. 3 Florida State		–		–		11	–	1	–	0
No. 5 West Virginia		–		–		11	–	1	–	0
Southern Miss		–		–		10	–	2	–	0
No. 13 Syracuse		–		–		10	–	2	–	0
Army		–		–		9	–	3	–	0
Louisville		–		–		8	–	3	–	0
South Carolina		–		–		8	–	4	–	0
Northern Illinois		–		–		7	–	4	–	0
Pittsburgh		–		–		6	–	5	–	0
Memphis State		–		–		6	–	5	–	0
Southwestern Louisiana		–		–		6	–	5	–	0
Rutgers		–		–		5	–	6	–	0
Akron		–		–		5	–	6	–	0
Penn State		–		–		5	–	6	–	0
Tulane		–		–		5	–	6	–	0
Temple		–		–		4	–	7	–	0
Tulsa		–		–		4	–	7	–	0
Boston College		–		–		3	–	8	–	0
Cincinnati		–		–		3	–	8	–	0
East Carolina		–		–		3	–	8	–	0
Navy		–		–		3	–	8	–	0
Virginia Tech		–		–		3	–	8	–	0
Rankings from AP Poll

The 1988 Tulsa Golden Hurricane football team represented the University of Tulsa as an independent during the 1988 NCAA Division I-A football season. In their first year under head coach David Rader, the Golden Hurricane compiled a 4–7 record. The team's statistical leaders included quarterback T. J. Rubley with 2,497 passing yards, Brett Adams with 602 rushing yards, and Dan Bitson with 1,138 receiving yards.

== Schedule ==
Date	Opponent	Site	Result	Attendance	Source
September 3	Kansas State	Skelly Stadium; Tulsa, OK	W 35–9	21,541	
September 10	at Arkansas	Razorback Stadium; Fayetteville, AR	L 26–30	43,008	
September 24	UTEP^{†}	Skelly Stadium; Tulsa, OK	L 24–27	20,057	
October 1	at No. 13 Oklahoma State	Lewis Field; Stillwater, OK (rivalry)	L 35–56	45,100	
October 8	at Louisville	Cardinal Stadium; Louisville, KY	L 3–9	24,381	
October 15	at Houston	Houston Astrodome; Houston, TX	L 28–82	14,068	
October 29	at UNLV	Sam Boyd Silver Bowl; Whitney, NV	W 33–7	18,425	
November 5	at No. 3 Miami (FL)	Miami Orange Bowl; Miami, FL	L 3–34	38,196	
November 12	at Memphis State	Liberty Bowl Memorial Stadium; Memphis, TN	L 20–26	8,213	
November 19	Temple	Skelly Stadium; Tulsa, OK	W 15–10	7,186	
November 26	Colorado State	Skelly Stadium; Tulsa, OK	W 32–28	7,500	
^{†}Homecoming; Rankings from AP Poll released prior to the game

.

== Roster ==
1988 Tulsa Golden Hurricane football team roster
Players			Coaches
Offense: Pos. / # / Name / Class; QB / 11 / T. J. Rubley / Fr	Defense: Pos. / # / Name / Class; DT / 48 / Dennis Byrd / Sr	Special teams: Pos. / # / Name / Class	Head coach: David Rader; Coordinators/assistant coaches: Bob Brush (Defensive coordinator); Legend: (C) Team captain; (S) Suspended; (I) Ineligible; Injured; Redshirt

== After the season ==
=== 1989 NFL draft ===
The following Golden Hurricane players were selected in the 1989 NFL draft following the season.

Round	Pick	Player	Position	NFL club
2	42	Dennis Byrd	Defensive tackle	New York Jets
9	250	Rich Stephens	Guard	Cincinnati Bengals
