= 1988 Temple Owls football team =

American college football season

1988 Temple Owls football
- Conference: Independent
- Record: 4–7
- Head coach: Bruce Arians (6th season)
- Offensive coordinator: Tony DeMeo (1st season)
- Defensive coordinator: Nick Rapone (4th season)
- Home stadium: Veterans Stadium

1988 Major eastern college football independents records
	Conf.					Overall
Team	W		L		T	W		L		T
No. 5 West Virginia $	5	–	0	–	0	11	–	1	–	0
No. 13 Syracuse	5	–	1	–	0	10	–	2	–	0
Pittsburgh	3	–	3	–	0	6	–	5	–	0
Temple	2	–	3	–	0	4	–	7	–	0
Rutgers	2	–	4	–	0	5	–	6	–	0
Penn State	2	–	4	–	0	5	–	6	–	0
Boston College	1	–	5	–	0	3	–	8	–	0
$ – Lambert Trophy Winner; Rankings from AP Poll

1988 NCAA Division I-A independents football records
	Conf.					Overall
Team	W		L		T	W		L		T
No. 1 Notre Dame		–		–		12	–	0	–	0
No. 2 Miami (FL)		–		–		11	–	1	–	0
No. 3 Florida State		–		–		11	–	1	–	0
No. 5 West Virginia		–		–		11	–	1	–	0
Southern Miss		–		–		10	–	2	–	0
No. 13 Syracuse		–		–		10	–	2	–	0
Army		–		–		9	–	3	–	0
Louisville		–		–		8	–	3	–	0
South Carolina		–		–		8	–	4	–	0
Northern Illinois		–		–		7	–	4	–	0
Pittsburgh		–		–		6	–	5	–	0
Memphis State		–		–		6	–	5	–	0
Southwestern Louisiana		–		–		6	–	5	–	0
Rutgers		–		–		5	–	6	–	0
Akron		–		–		5	–	6	–	0
Penn State		–		–		5	–	6	–	0
Tulane		–		–		5	–	6	–	0
Temple		–		–		4	–	7	–	0
Tulsa		–		–		4	–	7	–	0
Boston College		–		–		3	–	8	–	0
Cincinnati		–		–		3	–	8	–	0
East Carolina		–		–		3	–	8	–	0
Navy		–		–		3	–	8	–	0
Virginia Tech		–		–		3	–	8	–	0
Rankings from AP Poll

The 1988 Temple Owls football team was an American football team that represented Temple University as an independent during the 1988 NCAA Division I-A football season. In its sixth and final season under head coach Bruce Arians, the team compiled a 4–7 record and was outscored by a total of 317 to 207. The team played its home games at Veterans Stadium in Philadelphia.

The team's statistical leaders included Matt Baker with 1,539 passing yards, Todd McNair with 761 rushing yards, Mike Palys with 517 receiving yards, and placekicker Bill Wright with 55 points scored.

== Schedule ==
Date	Opponent	Site	Result	Attendance	Source
September 3	at Syracuse	Carrier Dome; Syracuse, NY	L 21–31	41,727	
September 10	No. 14 Alabama	Veterans Stadium; Philadelphia, PA	L 0–37	28,680	
September 17	at Navy	Navy–Marine Corps Memorial Stadium; Annapolis, MD	W 12–7	20,624	
October 1	Penn State	Veterans Stadium; Philadelphia, PA	L 9–45	66,592	
October 15	at Pittsburgh	Pitt Stadium; Pittsburgh, PA	L 7–42	32,832	
October 22	at California	California Memorial Stadium; Berkeley, CA	L 14–31	33,000	
October 29	at Rutgers	Rutgers Stadium; Piscataway, NJ	W 35–30	31,219	
November 5	East Carolina	Veterans Stadium; Philadelphia, PA	L 17–34	8,018	
November 12	at Akron	Rubber Bowl; Akron, OH	W 37–17	6,088	
November 19	at Tulsa	Skelly Stadium; Tulsa, OK	L 10–15	7,186	
November 26	Boston College	Veterans Stadium; Philadelphia, PA	W 45–28	12,892	
Rankings from AP Poll released prior to the game
