= 1988 Tulane Green Wave football team =

American college football season

1988 Tulane Green Wave football
- Conference: Independent
- Record: 5–6
- Head coach: Greg Davis (1st season)
- Offensive coordinator: Duke Christian (1st season)
- Home stadium: Louisiana Superdome

1988 NCAA Division I-A independents football records
	Conf.					Overall
Team	W		L		T	W		L		T
No. 1 Notre Dame		–		–		12	–	0	–	0
No. 2 Miami (FL)		–		–		11	–	1	–	0
No. 3 Florida State		–		–		11	–	1	–	0
No. 5 West Virginia		–		–		11	–	1	–	0
Southern Miss		–		–		10	–	2	–	0
No. 13 Syracuse		–		–		10	–	2	–	0
Army		–		–		9	–	3	–	0
Louisville		–		–		8	–	3	–	0
South Carolina		–		–		8	–	4	–	0
Northern Illinois		–		–		7	–	4	–	0
Pittsburgh		–		–		6	–	5	–	0
Memphis State		–		–		6	–	5	–	0
Southwestern Louisiana		–		–		6	–	5	–	0
Rutgers		–		–		5	–	6	–	0
Akron		–		–		5	–	6	–	0
Penn State		–		–		5	–	6	–	0
Tulane		–		–		5	–	6	–	0
Temple		–		–		4	–	7	–	0
Tulsa		–		–		4	–	7	–	0
Boston College		–		–		3	–	8	–	0
Cincinnati		–		–		3	–	8	–	0
East Carolina		–		–		3	–	8	–	0
Navy		–		–		3	–	8	–	0
Virginia Tech		–		–		3	–	8	–	0
Rankings from AP Poll

The 1988 Tulane Green Wave football team was an American football team that represented Tulane University during the 1988 NCAA Division I-A football season as an independent. In their first year under head coach Greg Davis, the team compiled a 5–6 record.

== Schedule ==
Date	Opponent	Site	Result	Attendance	Source
September 3	Chattanooga	Louisiana Superdome; New Orleans, LA	W 33–19	21,777	
September 10	at Iowa State	Cyclone Stadium; Ames, IA	L 13–30	41,780	
September 17	Kansas State	Louisiana Superdome; New Orleans, LA	W 20–16	24,490	
September 24	Memphis State	Louisiana Superdome; New Orleans, LA	W 20–19	26,426	
October 1	No. 6 Florida State	Louisiana Superdome; New Orleans, LA	L 28–48	34,364	
October 8	Southern Miss	Louisiana Superdome; New Orleans, LA (rivalry)	L 13–38	22,704	
October 22	Louisville	Louisiana Superdome; New Orleans, LA	L 35–38	24,824	
October 29	Southwestern Louisiana	Louisiana Superdome; New Orleans, LA	L 34–51	26,687	
November 5	at Ole Miss	Vaught–Hemingway Stadium; Oxford, MS (rivalry)	W 14–9	27,531	
November 19	Mississippi State	Louisiana Superdome; New Orleans, LA	W 27–22	20,176	
November 26	at No. 16 LSU	Tiger Stadium; Baton Rouge, LA (Battle for the Rag)	L 14–44	75,497	
Rankings from AP Poll released prior to the game

== Roster ==
1988 Tulane Green Wave football team roster
Players
Coaches
Offense

Pos.	#	Name	Class
FB	22	Melvin Adams	Sr
OT	68	Jim Bishop	Sr
RB		Garret Chachere	So
FB	4	Eric Dickerson	Jr
QB	10	Terrence Jones	Sr
WR	14	Jerome McIntosh	Jr
WR	21	Maurice Nelson	Sr
RB	23	Michael Pierce	Jr

Defense

Pos.	#	Name	Class
DB	31	Doug Adams	Sr
LB	95	Richard Harvey	Jr
DB		Mitchell Price	Jr

Special teams

Pos.	#	Name	Class

Head coach

- Greg Davis

Coordinators/assistant coaches

Legend

- (C) Team captain
- (S) Suspended
- (I) Ineligible
- Injured
- Redshirt
