= 1988 Navy Midshipmen football team =

American college football season

1988 Navy Midshipmen football
- Conference: Independent
- Record: 3–8
- Head coach: Elliott Uzelac (2nd season)
- MVP: Mark Pimpo
- Captains: Bert Pangrazio; Mark Pimpo
- Home stadium: Navy–Marine Corps Memorial Stadium

1988 NCAA Division I-A independents football records
	Conf.					Overall
Team	W		L		T	W		L		T
No. 1 Notre Dame		–		–		12	–	0	–	0
No. 2 Miami (FL)		–		–		11	–	1	–	0
No. 3 Florida State		–		–		11	–	1	–	0
No. 5 West Virginia		–		–		11	–	1	–	0
Southern Miss		–		–		10	–	2	–	0
No. 13 Syracuse		–		–		10	–	2	–	0
Army		–		–		9	–	3	–	0
Louisville		–		–		8	–	3	–	0
South Carolina		–		–		8	–	4	–	0
Northern Illinois		–		–		7	–	4	–	0
Pittsburgh		–		–		6	–	5	–	0
Memphis State		–		–		6	–	5	–	0
Southwestern Louisiana		–		–		6	–	5	–	0
Rutgers		–		–		5	–	6	–	0
Akron		–		–		5	–	6	–	0
Penn State		–		–		5	–	6	–	0
Tulane		–		–		5	–	6	–	0
Temple		–		–		4	–	7	–	0
Tulsa		–		–		4	–	7	–	0
Boston College		–		–		3	–	8	–	0
Cincinnati		–		–		3	–	8	–	0
East Carolina		–		–		3	–	8	–	0
Navy		–		–		3	–	8	–	0
Virginia Tech		–		–		3	–	8	–	0
Rankings from AP Poll

The 1988 Navy Midshipmen football team represented the United States Naval Academy as an independent during the 1988 NCAA Division I-A football season.

== Schedule ==
Date	Opponent	Site	Result	Attendance	Source
September 3	James Madison	Navy–Marine Corps Memorial Stadium; Annapolis, MD	W 27–14	21,318	
September 10	Delaware	Navy–Marine Corps Memorial Stadium; Annapolis, MD	W 30–3	22,987	
September 17	Temple	Navy–Marine Corps Memorial Stadium; Annapolis, MD	L 7–12	20,624	
September 24	at The Citadel	Johnson Hagood Stadium; Charleston, SC	L 35–42	20,754	
October 1	Yale	Navy–Marine Corps Memorial Stadium; Annapolis, MD	W 41–7	31,067	
October 8	at Air Force	Falcon Stadium; Colorado Springs, CO (Commander-in-Chief's Trophy)	L 24–34	50,570	
October 22	at Pittsburgh	Pitt Stadium; Pittsburgh, PA	L 6–52	34,230	
October 29	No. 1 Notre Dame	Memorial Stadium; Baltimore, MD (rivalry)	L 7–22	54,929	
November 5	at No. 13 Syracuse	Carrier Dome; Syracuse, NY	L 21–49	49,784	
November 12	at South Carolina	Williams–Brice Stadium; Columbia, SC	L 8–19	66,000	
December 3	vs. Army	Veterans Stadium; Philadelphia, PA (Army–Navy Game)	L 15–20	68,435	
Rankings from AP Poll released prior to the game

== Roster ==
1988 Navy Midshipmen football team roster
Players
Coaches
Offense

Pos.	#	Name	Class
RB	24	Luther Archer	Sr
TE	98	Dave Berghult	So
RB	32	James Bradley	Jr
RB	33	Mike Burns	Jr
WR	80	Jerry Dawson	So
RB	35	Dominic Flis	So
OL	68	Bob Friedman	So
QB	16	Alton Grizzard	So
OL	74	Greg Hlatky	So
RB	11	Aaron Johnson	Jr
WR	84	Carl Jordan	Sr
OL	57	Mike Kircher	Jr
OL	78	Mike Maier	Jr
QB	9	B. J. Mason	Fr
QB	15	Gary McIntosh	So
WR	93	Jon Neumann	So
RB	29	Jason Pace	So
FB	31	Bert Pangrazio	Sr
RB		Albert Peltier
RB		Rodney Purifoy
RB	34	Deric Sims	So
WR	85	Shane Smith	Jr
OL	75	Mike Sweeney	Jr
RB	20	Chris Venezia	Sr
RB		Joe Vitelli
TE	83	Carl Voss	Fr
TE	87	Kevin Voss	Sr

Defense

Pos.	#	Name	Class
LB	92	Bill Bowling	So
DB	13	Rodney Brown	Jr
DB	39	Scott Carson	So
DB	4	Jim Chatfield	Sr
DB	18	Daron Fullwood	Jr
DL	59	Chris Graham	So
DT	76	Troy Holland	Sr
DL	51	Andy Kirkland	So
DB	49	Bert LaRocca	So
DL	46	David Lowe	Jr
LB	37	Mark Pimpo	Sr
DL	77	Scott Prinz	Jr
DL	54	Greg Reppar	Jr
DB	17	Steve Tazza	Jr
DB	42	Bob Weissenfels	Jr
LB	43	Ray Worthington	Sr

Special teams

Pos.	#	Name	Class
K	99	Ted Fundoukos	Sr
K	8	Todd Peterson	Fr
P	97	Gerard Shanley	Jr
P	6	Jefferson Triplett	Fr

Head coach

- Elliot Uzelac

Coordinators/assistant coaches

Legend

- (C) Team captain
- (S) Suspended
- (I) Ineligible
- Injured
- Redshirt
