= 1988 South Carolina Gamecocks football team =

American college football season

1988 South Carolina Gamecocks football

Liberty Bowl, L 10–34 vs. Indiana
- Conference: Independent
- Record: 8–4
- Head coach: Joe Morrison (6th season)
- Offensive coordinator: Al Groh (1st season)
- Offensive scheme: Pro-style
- Defensive coordinator: Joe Lee Dunn (2nd season)
- Home stadium: Williams–Brice Stadium

1988 NCAA Division I-A independents football records
	Conf.					Overall
Team	W		L		T	W		L		T
No. 1 Notre Dame		–		–		12	–	0	–	0
No. 2 Miami (FL)		–		–		11	–	1	–	0
No. 3 Florida State		–		–		11	–	1	–	0
No. 5 West Virginia		–		–		11	–	1	–	0
Southern Miss		–		–		10	–	2	–	0
No. 13 Syracuse		–		–		10	–	2	–	0
Army		–		–		9	–	3	–	0
Louisville		–		–		8	–	3	–	0
South Carolina		–		–		8	–	4	–	0
Northern Illinois		–		–		7	–	4	–	0
Pittsburgh		–		–		6	–	5	–	0
Memphis State		–		–		6	–	5	–	0
Southwestern Louisiana		–		–		6	–	5	–	0
Rutgers		–		–		5	–	6	–	0
Akron		–		–		5	–	6	–	0
Penn State		–		–		5	–	6	–	0
Tulane		–		–		5	–	6	–	0
Temple		–		–		4	–	7	–	0
Tulsa		–		–		4	–	7	–	0
Boston College		–		–		3	–	8	–	0
Cincinnati		–		–		3	–	8	–	0
East Carolina		–		–		3	–	8	–	0
Navy		–		–		3	–	8	–	0
Virginia Tech		–		–		3	–	8	–	0
Rankings from AP Poll

The 1988 South Carolina Gamecocks football team represented the University of South Carolina as an independent during the 1988 NCAA Division I-A football season. The team played its home games at Williams–Brice Stadium. They compiled a record of 8–4 with a loss against Indiana in the Liberty Bowl. The Gamecocks were led by head coach Joe Morrison in his final season as head coach prior to his dying of a heart attack in February 1989.

South Carolina had its final eight-win season of the 1980s, and its fifth in ten years. The Gamecocks started 6–0 and were ranked No. 8 in the country. However, they lost four of their final six games, and finished the season unranked.

The 1988 season was also marked by a scandal which surfaced in October, concerning the alleged widespread use of steroids in the school's football program.

== Schedule ==
Date	Opponent	Rank	Site	TV	Result	Attendance	Source
September 3	North Carolina	No. 19	Williams–Brice Stadium; Columbia, SC (rivalry)		W 31–10	73,275	
September 10	Western Carolina	No. 16	Williams–Brice Stadium; Columbia, SC		W 38–0	68,800	
September 17	East Carolina	No. 14	Williams–Brice Stadium; Columbia, SC		W 17–0	66,000	
September 24	No. 6 Georgia	No. 14	Williams–Brice Stadium; Columbia, SC (rivalry)	TBS	W 23–10	74,800	
October 1	Appalachian State	No. 8	Williams–Brice Stadium; Columbia, SC		W 35–9	71,380	
October 8	at Virginia Tech	No. 8	Lane Stadium; Blacksburg, VA		W 26–24	42,845	
October 15	at Georgia Tech	No. 8	Bobby Dodd Stadium; Atlanta, GA		L 0–34	45,103	
October 29	at NC State	No. 17	Carter–Finley Stadium; Raleigh, NC	ESPN	W 23–7	54,800	
November 5	No. 5 Florida State	No. 15	Williams–Brice Stadium; Columbia, SC	ESPN	L 0–59	75,000	
November 12	Navy		Williams–Brice Stadium; Columbia, SC		W 19–8	66,000	
November 19	at No. 15 Clemson		Memorial Stadium; Clemson, South Carolina (rivalry)	JPS	L 10–29	84,867	
December 28	vs. Indiana		Liberty Bowl Memorial Stadium; Memphis, TN (Liberty Bowl)	Raycom	L 10–34	39,210	
Rankings from AP Poll released prior to the game

== Roster ==
Todd Ellis – QB; Mike Dingle – RB; Harold Green – RB; Robert Brooks – WR; Jamie Penland- WR; Patrick Hinton – LB; Ron Rabune – Safety; Robert Robinson – CB; Kevin Hendrix – DE; Collin Mackie – Kicker; Keith Bing – RB Mike Dingle – RB Gerald Williams – RB Albert Haynes – RB Ray Bolton – RB Eddie Miller WR Carl Platt – WR George Rush – WR Anthony Parlor – WR Hardin Brown – WR Vic McConnell – WR Bill Zorr – WR Darren Greene – WR Ken Watson – TE Trent Simpson – TE Mark Fryer – OL Ike Harris – OL Randy Harwell – OL Paul Shivers – OL Calvin Stephens – OL Dany Branch – OL Charles Gowan – OL Kenny Haynes – OL Marty Dye – DL Derrick Frazier – DL Tim High – DL David Taylor – DL Patrick Blackwell – DL Kevin Hendrix – DL Kurt Wilson – DL Theartis Woodard – DL Patrick Hinton – LB Derrick Little – LB Matt McKernan – LB Corey Miller – LB Keith Emmons – LB Mike Tolbert – DB Ron Rabune – DB Robert Robinson – DB Stephane Williams – DB Dale Campbell – DB Mike Conway – DB Pat Turner – DB

== Coaching staff ==
- Joe Morrison, head coach
- Al Groh, offensive coordinator
- Joe Lee Dunn, defensive coordinator
- Charlie Weis, assistant coach
- Fred Jackson, quarterbacks and wide receivers coach

== See also ==
- University of South Carolina steroid scandal
