= 1988 Syracuse Orangemen football team =

American college football season

1988 Syracuse Orangemen football

Hall of Fame Bowl champion

Hall of Fame Bowl, W 23–10 vs. LSU
- Conference: Independent

Ranking
- Coaches: No. 12
- AP: No. 13
- Record: 10–2
- Head coach: Dick MacPherson (8th season)
- Offensive coordinator: George DeLeone (2nd season)
- Captains: Daryl Johnston; Markus Paul
- Home stadium: Carrier Dome

1988 Major eastern college football independents records
	Conf.					Overall
Team	W		L		T	W		L		T
No. 5 West Virginia $	5	–	0	–	0	11	–	1	–	0
No. 13 Syracuse	5	–	1	–	0	10	–	2	–	0
Pittsburgh	3	–	3	–	0	6	–	5	–	0
Temple	2	–	3	–	0	4	–	7	–	0
Rutgers	2	–	4	–	0	5	–	6	–	0
Penn State	2	–	4	–	0	5	–	6	–	0
Boston College	1	–	5	–	0	3	–	8	–	0
$ – Lambert Trophy Winner; Rankings from AP Poll

1988 NCAA Division I-A independents football records
	Conf.					Overall
Team	W		L		T	W		L		T
No. 1 Notre Dame		–		–		12	–	0	–	0
No. 2 Miami (FL)		–		–		11	–	1	–	0
No. 3 Florida State		–		–		11	–	1	–	0
No. 5 West Virginia		–		–		11	–	1	–	0
Southern Miss		–		–		10	–	2	–	0
No. 13 Syracuse		–		–		10	–	2	–	0
Army		–		–		9	–	3	–	0
Louisville		–		–		8	–	3	–	0
South Carolina		–		–		8	–	4	–	0
Northern Illinois		–		–		7	–	4	–	0
Pittsburgh		–		–		6	–	5	–	0
Memphis State		–		–		6	–	5	–	0
Southwestern Louisiana		–		–		6	–	5	–	0
Rutgers		–		–		5	–	6	–	0
Akron		–		–		5	–	6	–	0
Penn State		–		–		5	–	6	–	0
Tulane		–		–		5	–	6	–	0
Temple		–		–		4	–	7	–	0
Tulsa		–		–		4	–	7	–	0
Boston College		–		–		3	–	8	–	0
Cincinnati		–		–		3	–	8	–	0
East Carolina		–		–		3	–	8	–	0
Navy		–		–		3	–	8	–	0
Virginia Tech		–		–		3	–	8	–	0
Rankings from AP Poll

The 1988 Syracuse Orangemen football team represented Syracuse University as an independent during the 1988 NCAA Division I-A football season. Led by eighth-year head coach Dick MacPherson, the Orangemen compiled a record of 10–2. Syracuse was invited to the Hall of Fame Bowl, where the Orangemen defeated LSU. The team played home games at the Carrier Dome in Syracuse, New York.

== Schedule ==
Date	Opponent	Rank	Site	Result	Attendance	Source
September 3	Temple		Carrier Dome; Syracuse, NY	W 31–21	41,727	
September 10	at Ohio State		Ohio Stadium; Columbus, OH	L 9–26	89,768	
September 24	Virginia Tech		Carrier Dome; Syracuse, NY	W 35–0	41,118	
October 1	Maryland		Carrier Dome; Syracuse, NY	W 20–9	45,197	
October 8	Rutgers		Carrier Dome; Syracuse, NY	W 34–20	48,798	
October 15	at Penn State		Beaver Stadium; University Park, PA (rivalry)	W 24–10	85,916	
October 22	at East Carolina	No. 19	Ficklen Memorial Stadium; Greenville, NC	W 38–14	16,450	
November 5	Navy	No. 16	Carrier Dome; Syracuse, NY	W 49–21	49,784	
November 12	at Boston College	No. 15	Alumni Stadium; Chestnut Hill, MA	W 45–20	32,000	
November 19	at No. 4 West Virginia	No. 14	Mountaineer Field; Morgantown, WV (rivalry)	L 9–31	65,127	
December 3	Pittsburgh	No. 18	Carrier Dome; Syracuse, NY (rivalry)	W 24–7	49,860	
January 2	vs. No. 16 LSU	No. 17	Tampa Stadium; Tampa, FL (Hall of Fame Bowl)	W 23–10	51,112	
Rankings from AP Poll released prior to the game

== Roster ==
1988 Syracuse Orangemen football team roster
Players
Coaches
Offense

Pos.	#	Name	Class
RB	36	Robert Drummond	Sr
RB	32	Daryl Johnston	Sr
QB	5	Todd Philcox	Sr

Defense

Pos.	#	Name	Class
LB		David Bavaro	Jr
DT		Fred DeRiggi	Jr
DB	10	Markus Paul	Sr
LB	90	Terry Wooden	Jr

Special teams

Pos.	#	Name	Class

Head coach

- Dick MacPherson

Coordinators/assistant coaches

Legend

- (C) Team captain
- (S) Suspended
- (I) Ineligible
- Injured
- Redshirt
