= 1988 Southwestern Louisiana Ragin' Cajuns football team =

American college football season

1988 Southwestern Louisiana Ragin' Cajuns football
- Conference: Independent
- Record: 6–5
- Head coach: Nelson Stokley (3rd season)
- Home stadium: Cajun Field

1988 NCAA Division I-A independents football records
	Conf.					Overall
Team	W		L		T	W		L		T
No. 1 Notre Dame		–		–		12	–	0	–	0
No. 2 Miami (FL)		–		–		11	–	1	–	0
No. 3 Florida State		–		–		11	–	1	–	0
No. 5 West Virginia		–		–		11	–	1	–	0
Southern Miss		–		–		10	–	2	–	0
No. 13 Syracuse		–		–		10	–	2	–	0
Army		–		–		9	–	3	–	0
Louisville		–		–		8	–	3	–	0
South Carolina		–		–		8	–	4	–	0
Northern Illinois		–		–		7	–	4	–	0
Pittsburgh		–		–		6	–	5	–	0
Memphis State		–		–		6	–	5	–	0
Southwestern Louisiana		–		–		6	–	5	–	0
Rutgers		–		–		5	–	6	–	0
Akron		–		–		5	–	6	–	0
Penn State		–		–		5	–	6	–	0
Tulane		–		–		5	–	6	–	0
Temple		–		–		4	–	7	–	0
Tulsa		–		–		4	–	7	–	0
Boston College		–		–		3	–	8	–	0
Cincinnati		–		–		3	–	8	–	0
East Carolina		–		–		3	–	8	–	0
Navy		–		–		3	–	8	–	0
Virginia Tech		–		–		3	–	8	–	0
Rankings from AP Poll

The 1988 Southwestern Louisiana Ragin' Cajuns football team was an American football team that represented the University of Southwestern Louisiana (now known as the University of Louisiana at Lafayette) as an independent during the 1988 NCAA Division I-A football season. In their third year under head coach Nelson Stokley, the team compiled a 6–5 record.

== Schedule ==
Date	Opponent	Site	Result	Attendance	Source
September 3	Cal State Fullerton	Cajun Field; Lafayette, LA	W 24–9	11,457	
September 18	Sam Houston State	Cajun Field; Lafayette, LA	W 33–8	19,500	
September 24	Rice	Cajun Field; Lafayette, LA	W 41–16	24,300	
October 1	at East Carolina	Ficklen Memorial Stadium; Greenville, NC	W 48–36	18,750	
October 8	at Louisiana Tech	Joe Aillet Stadium; Ruston, LA (rivalry)	L 16–19	18,615	
October 15	Northern Illinois	Cajun Field; Lafayette, LA	W 45–0	27,300	
October 22	Southern Miss	Cajun Field; Lafayette, LA	L 14–27	23,599	
October 29	at Tulane	Louisiana Superdome; New Orleans, LA	W 51–34	26,687	
November 5	at Memphis State	Liberty Bowl Memorial Stadium; Memphis, TN	L 3–20	18,174	
November 12	at No. 18 Alabama	Legion Field; Birmingham, AL	L 0–17	66,537	
November 19	Arkansas State	Cajun Field; Lafayette, LA	L 21–38	16,718	
Rankings from AP Poll released prior to the game
