= 1988 Louisville Cardinals football team =

American college football season

1988 Louisville Cardinals football
- Conference: Independent
- Record: 8–3
- Head coach: Howard Schnellenberger (4th season)
- Defensive coordinator: Rick Lantz (3rd season)
- Home stadium: Cardinal Stadium

1988 NCAA Division I-A independents football records
	Conf.					Overall
Team	W		L		T	W		L		T
No. 1 Notre Dame		–		–		12	–	0	–	0
No. 2 Miami (FL)		–		–		11	–	1	–	0
No. 3 Florida State		–		–		11	–	1	–	0
No. 5 West Virginia		–		–		11	–	1	–	0
Southern Miss		–		–		10	–	2	–	0
No. 13 Syracuse		–		–		10	–	2	–	0
Army		–		–		9	–	3	–	0
Louisville		–		–		8	–	3	–	0
South Carolina		–		–		8	–	4	–	0
Northern Illinois		–		–		7	–	4	–	0
Pittsburgh		–		–		6	–	5	–	0
Memphis State		–		–		6	–	5	–	0
Southwestern Louisiana		–		–		6	–	5	–	0
Rutgers		–		–		5	–	6	–	0
Akron		–		–		5	–	6	–	0
Penn State		–		–		5	–	6	–	0
Tulane		–		–		5	–	6	–	0
Temple		–		–		4	–	7	–	0
Tulsa		–		–		4	–	7	–	0
Boston College		–		–		3	–	8	–	0
Cincinnati		–		–		3	–	8	–	0
East Carolina		–		–		3	–	8	–	0
Navy		–		–		3	–	8	–	0
Virginia Tech		–		–		3	–	8	–	0
Rankings from AP Poll

The 1988 Louisville Cardinals football team represented the University of Louisville in the 1988 NCAA Division I-A football season. The Cardinals, led by fourth-year head coach Howard Schnellenberger, participated as independents and played their home games at Cardinal Stadium.

== Schedule ==
Date	Opponent	Site	Result	Attendance	Source
September 3	at Maryland	Byrd Stadium; College Park, MD	L 16–27	30,457	
September 10	Wyoming	Cardinal Stadium; Louisville, KY	L 9–44	29,105	
September 17	Memphis State	Cardinal Stadium; Louisville, KY (rivalry)	W 29–18	22,476	
September 24	at North Carolina	Kenan Memorial Stadium; Chapel Hill, NC	W 38–34	49,900	
October 1	at Southern Miss	M. M. Roberts Stadium; Hattiesburg, MS	L 23–30	17,584	
October 8	Tulsa^{†}	Cardinal Stadium; Louisville, KY	W 9–3	24,381	
October 15	Virginia	Cardinal Stadium; Louisville, KY	W 30–28	30,142	
October 22	at Tulane	Louisiana Superdome; New Orleans, LA	W 38–35	24,824	
October 29	at Cincinnati	Nippert Stadium; Cincinnati, OH (The Keg of Nails)	W 21–6	19,193	
November 5	Virginia Tech	Cardinal Stadium; Louisville, KY	W 13–3	21,107	
November 12	Western Kentucky	Cardinal Stadium; Louisville, KY	W 35–17	31,636	
^{†}Homecoming

== Roster ==
1988 Louisville Cardinals football team roster
Players
Coaches
Offense

Pos.	#	Name	Class
TE	81	Chad Fortune	Jr
QB	15	Jay Gruden	Sr
QB	7	Browning Nagle	RSo
QB	13	Erik Watts	RFr

Defense

Pos.	#	Name	Class
DE	96	Mike Flores	RSo
LB	48	Mark Sander	RSo
DT	99	Ted Washington	So

Special teams

Pos.	#	Name	Class

Head coach

- Howard Schnellenberger

Coordinators/assistant coaches

Michael Brooks

Legend

- (C) Team captain
- (S) Suspended
- (I) Ineligible
- Injured
- Redshirt
