= 1988 Florida State Seminoles football team =

American college football season

1988 Florida State Seminoles football

Sugar Bowl champion

Sugar Bowl, W 13–7 vs. Auburn
- Conference: Independent

Ranking
- Coaches: No. 3
- AP: No. 3
- Record: 11–1
- Head coach: Bobby Bowden (13th season)
- Offensive coordinator: Wayne McDuffie (6th season)
- Offensive scheme: I formation, Pro set
- Defensive coordinator: Mickey Andrews (5th season)
- Base defense: 4–3
- Captains: Chip Ferguson; Deion Sanders; Alphonso Williams
- Home stadium: Doak Campbell Stadium

1988 NCAA Division I-A independents football records
| | Conf. | | | | | Overall |
| Team | W | | L | | T | W | | L | | T |
|---|---|---|---|---|---|---|---|---|---|---|
| No. 1 Notre Dame | | – | | – | | 12 | – | 0 | – | 0 |
| No. 2 Miami (FL) | | – | | – | | 11 | – | 1 | – | 0 |
| No. 3 Florida State | | – | | – | | 11 | – | 1 | – | 0 |
| No. 5 West Virginia | | – | | – | | 11 | – | 1 | – | 0 |
| Southern Miss | | – | | – | | 10 | – | 2 | – | 0 |
| No. 13 Syracuse | | – | | – | | 10 | – | 2 | – | 0 |
| Army | | – | | – | | 9 | – | 3 | – | 0 |
| Louisville | | – | | – | | 8 | – | 3 | – | 0 |
| South Carolina | | – | | – | | 8 | – | 4 | – | 0 |
| Northern Illinois | | – | | – | | 7 | – | 4 | – | 0 |
| Pittsburgh | | – | | – | | 6 | – | 5 | – | 0 |
| Memphis State | | – | | – | | 6 | – | 5 | – | 0 |
| Southwestern Louisiana | | – | | – | | 6 | – | 5 | – | 0 |
| Rutgers | | – | | – | | 5 | – | 6 | – | 0 |
| Akron | | – | | – | | 5 | – | 6 | – | 0 |
| Penn State | | – | | – | | 5 | – | 6 | – | 0 |
| Tulane | | – | | – | | 5 | – | 6 | – | 0 |
| Temple | | – | | – | | 4 | – | 7 | – | 0 |
| Tulsa | | – | | – | | 4 | – | 7 | – | 0 |
| Boston College | | – | | – | | 3 | – | 8 | – | 0 |
| Cincinnati | | – | | – | | 3 | – | 8 | – | 0 |
| East Carolina | | – | | – | | 3 | – | 8 | – | 0 |
| Navy | | – | | – | | 3 | – | 8 | – | 0 |
| Virginia Tech | | – | | – | | 3 | – | 8 | – | 0 |
Rankings from AP Poll

The 1988 Florida State Seminoles football team represented Florida State University as an independent during the 1988 NCAA Division I-A football season. Led by 13th-year head coach Bobby Bowden, the Seminoles compiled a record of 11–1 with win in the Sugar Bowl over Auburn. Florida State played home games at Doak Campbell Stadium in Tallahassee, Florida.

Defensive back Deion Sanders was a Heisman Trophy finalist, finishing in eighth place.

== Schedule ==
| Date | Time | Opponent | Rank | Site | TV | Result | Attendance | Source |
|---|---|---|---|---|---|---|---|---|
| September 3 | 9:00 p.m. | at No. 6 Miami (FL) | No. 1 | Miami Orange Bowl; Miami, FL (rivalry) | CBS | L 0–31 | 77,836 | |
| September 10 | 7:00 p.m. | Southern Miss | No. 10 | Doak Campbell Stadium; Tallahassee, FL | | W 49–13 | 53,129 | |
| September 17 | 2:30 p.m. | at No. 3 Clemson | No. 10 | Memorial Stadium; Clemson, SC (rivalry) | CBS | W 24–21 | 85,576 | |
| September 24 | 4:00 p.m. | Michigan State | No. 9 | Doak Campbell Stadium; Tallahassee, FL | ESPN | W 30–7 | 61,757 | |
| October 1 | 8:00 p.m. | at Tulane | No. 6 | Louisiana Superdome; New Orleans, LA | | W 48–28 | 34,364 | |
| October 8 | 2:00 p.m. | No. 7 (I-AA) Georgia Southern^{†} | No. 6 | Doak Campbell Stadium; Tallahassee, FL | | W 28–10 | 59,109 | |
| October 15 | 2:00 p.m. | East Carolina | No. 5 | Doak Campbell Stadium; Tallahassee, FL | | W 45–21 | 56,391 | |
| October 22 | 2:00 p.m. | Louisiana Tech | No. 7 | Doak Campbell Stadium; Tallahassee, FL | | W 66–3 | 51,703 | |
| November 5 | 8:00 p.m. | at No. 15 South Carolina | No. 5 | Williams–Brice Stadium; Columbia, SC | ESPN | W 59–0 | 75,000 | |
| November 12 | 7:00 p.m. | Virginia Tech | No. 5 | Doak Campbell Stadium; Tallahassee, FL | | W 41–14 | 50,910 | |
| November 26 | 7:30 p.m. | Florida | No. 5 | Doak Campbell Stadium; Tallahassee, FL (rivalry) | ESPN | W 52–17 | 62,693 | |
| January 2 | 8:00 p.m. | vs. No. 7 Auburn | No. 4 | Louisiana Superdome; New Orleans, LA (Sugar Bowl) | ABC | W 13–7 | 61,934 | |
^{†}Homecoming; Rankings from AP Poll released prior to the game; All times are in Eastern time; Source:

== Rankings ==
Ranking movements Legend: ██ Increase in ranking ██ Decrease in ranking ( ) = First-place votes
| | Week | | | | | | | | | | | | | | | | |
| Poll | Pre | 1 | 2 | 3 | 4 | 5 | 6 | 7 | 8 | 9 | 10 | 11 | 12 | 13 | 14 | 15 | Final |
|---|---|---|---|---|---|---|---|---|---|---|---|---|---|---|---|---|---|
| AP | 1 (44) | 1 (41) | 10 | 10 | 9 | 6 | 6 | 5 | 7 | 6 | 5 | 5 | 5 | 5 | 4 | 4 | 3 |
| Coaches | 1 (37) | 1 (37) | 12 | 12 | 9 | 8 | 7 | 6 | 7 | 7 | 8 (1) | 5 (1) | 5 (1) | 5 (1) | 4 (1) | 4 (1) | 3 (1) |

== Game summaries ==
=== At Miami (FL) ===
Florida State at Miami (FL)

| Team | 1 | 2 | 3 | 4 | Total |
|---|---|---|---|---|---|
| #1 Seminoles | 0 | 0 | 0 | 0 | 0 |
| • #6 Hurricanes | 3 | 14 | 7 | 7 | 31 |

- Date: September 3
- Location: Miami Orange Bowl, Miami, Florida
- Game attendance: 77,836
- TV announcers (CBS Sports): Brent Musburger, Pat Haden, and John Dockery

Scoring summary
| 1 | 11:46 | MIA | Carlos Huerta 46-yard field goal | MIA 3-0 |
| 2 | 14:27 | MIA | Cleveland Gary 2-yard run (Carlos Huerta kick) | MIA 10-0 |
| 2 | 0:11 | MIA | Rob Chudzinski 19-yard pass from Steve Walsh (Carlos Huerta kick) | MIA 17-0 |
| 3 | 8:54 | MIA | Leonard Conley 5-yard pass from Steve Walsh (Carlos Huerta kick) | MIA 24-0 |
| 4 | 1:30 | MIA | Pee Wee Smith 17-yard pass from Craig Erickson (Carlos Huerta kick) | MIA 31-0 |

=== Southern Miss ===
| | 1 | 2 | 3 | 4 | Total |
|---|---|---|---|---|---|
| Southern Miss | 0 | 10 | 0 | 3 | 13 |
| Florida St | 14 | 14 | 14 | 7 | 49 |

=== At Clemson ===
Florida State at Clemson

| Team | 1 | 2 | 3 | 4 | Total |
|---|---|---|---|---|---|
| • #10 Seminoles | 0 | 7 | 14 | 3 | 24 |
| #3 Tigers | 7 | 7 | 0 | 7 | 21 |

- Date: September 17
- Location: Memorial Stadium
- Game attendance: 82,500

Scoring summary
| Q1 | CLEM | Cooper 61 yard pass from C. Davis (Seyle kick) | CLEM 7–0 |
| Q2 | FSU | D. Carter 40 yard pass from Ferguson (Andrews kick) | Tie 7–7 |
| Q2 | CLEM | R. Williams 7 yard run (Seyle kick) | CLEM 14–7 |
| Q3 | FSU | D. Sanders 76 yard punt return (Andrews kick) | Tie 14–14 |
| Q3 | FSU | D. Williams 1 yard run (Andrews kick) | FSU 21–14 |
| Q4 | CLEM | T. Johnson 19 yard run | Tie 21–21 |
| Q4 | FSU | Andrews 19 yard field goal | FSU 24–21 |

=== Michigan State ===
Michigan State at Florida State

| Team | 1 | 2 | 3 | 4 | Total |
|---|---|---|---|---|---|
| Spartans | 0 | 0 | 7 | 0 | 7 |
| • #9 Seminoles | 7 | 6 | 0 | 17 | 30 |

- Date: September 24
- Location: Doak Campbell Stadium
- Game attendance: 61,757

=== At Tulane ===
| | 1 | 2 | 3 | 4 | Total |
|---|---|---|---|---|---|
| Florida St | 10 | 21 | 0 | 17 | 48 |
| Tulane | 0 | 14 | 7 | 7 | 28 |

=== Georgia Southern ===
| | 1 | 2 | 3 | 4 | Total |
|---|---|---|---|---|---|
| Georgia Southern | 0 | 0 | 3 | 7 | 10 |
| Florida St | 7 | 0 | 0 | 21 | 28 |

=== East Carolina ===
| | 1 | 2 | 3 | 4 | Total |
|---|---|---|---|---|---|
| East Carolina | 0 | 14 | 0 | 7 | 21 |
| Florida St | 14 | 14 | 3 | 14 | 45 |

=== Louisiana Tech ===
| | 1 | 2 | 3 | 4 | Total |
|---|---|---|---|---|---|
| Louisiana Tech | 0 | 3 | 0 | 0 | 3 |
| Florida St | 28 | 7 | 17 | 14 | 66 |

=== At South Carolina ===
| | 1 | 2 | 3 | 4 | Total |
|---|---|---|---|---|---|
| Florida St | 14 | 17 | 14 | 14 | 59 |
| South Carolina | 0 | 0 | 0 | 0 | 0 |

=== Virginia Tech ===
| | 1 | 2 | 3 | 4 | Total |
|---|---|---|---|---|---|
| Virginia Tech | 0 | 7 | 0 | 7 | 14 |
| Florida St | 0 | 14 | 20 | 7 | 41 |

=== Florida ===
| | 1 | 2 | 3 | 4 | Total |
|---|---|---|---|---|---|
| Florida | 7 | 3 | 0 | 7 | 17 |
| Florida St | 21 | 3 | 21 | 7 | 52 |

=== Vs. Auburn—Sugar Bowl ===
Florida State vs. Auburn

| Team | 1 | 2 | 3 | 4 | Total |
|---|---|---|---|---|---|
| • #4 Seminoles | 10 | 3 | 0 | 0 | 13 |
| #7 Tigers | 0 | 7 | 0 | 0 | 7 |

- Date: January 2
- Location: Louisiana Superdome, New Orleans
- Game start: 7:45 p.m. CST
- Elapsed time: 3:11
- Game attendance: 61,934
- Game weather: Indoors
- Referee: John Soffey
- TV announcers (ABC): Al Michaels, Frank Gifford, Dan Dierdorf

Scoring summary
| 1 | 9:48 | FSU | Dayne Williams 2-yard run (Richie Andrews kick) | FSU 7–0 |
| 1 | 5:57 | FSU | Bill Mason 35-yard field goal | FSU 10–0 |
| 2 | 11:00 | FSU | Bill Mason 31-yard field goal | FSU 13–0 |
| 2 | 4:09 | AUB | Walter Reeves 20-yard pass from Reggie Slack (Win Lyle kick) | FSU 13–7 |

== Roster ==
1988 Florida State Seminoles football team roster
Players
Coaches
Offense

| Pos. | # | Name | Class |
|---|---|---|---|
| FB | 22 | Edgar Bennett | So |
| RB | 31 | Marion Butts | Sr |
| TB | 13 | Dexter Carter | Jr |
| QB | 5 | Chip Ferguson | Sr |
| QB | 14 | Brad Johnson | Fr |
| RB | 33 | Sammie Smith | Jr |
| QB | 11 | Casey Weldon | Fr |
| QB | 4 | Peter Tom Willis | Jr |

Defense

| Pos. | # | Name | Class |
|---|---|---|---|
| DB | 6 | LeRoy Butler | Jr |
| DL | 53 | Odell Haggins | Jr |
| CB | 2 | Deion Sanders | Sr |
| DB | 28 | Dedrick Dodge | So |

Special teams

| Pos. | # | Name | Class |
|---|---|---|---|
| K | 9 | Richie Andrews | So |

Head coach

- Bobby Bowden

Coordinators/assistant coaches

- Wayne McDuffie (Offensive coordinator)
- Mickey Andrews (Defensive coordinator)
- Skip Holtz (Graduate assistant)

Legend

- (C) Team captain
- (S) Suspended
- (I) Ineligible
- Injured
- Redshirt

== 1989 NFL draft ==
| Player | Position | Round | Pick | NFL club |
|---|---|---|---|---|
| Deion Sanders | Cornerback | 1 | 5 | Atlanta Falcons |
| Sammie Smith | Running back | 1 | 9 | Miami Dolphins |
| Pat Tomberlin | Guard | 4 | 99 | Indianapolis Colts |
| Marion Butts | Running back | 7 | 183 | San Diego Chargers |
| Victor Floyd | Running back | 11 | 287 | San Diego Chargers |
| Stan Shiver | Defensive back | 12 | 310 | Green Bay Packers |
