= 1988 Boston College Eagles football team =

American college football season

1988 Boston College Eagles football
- Conference: Independent
- Record: 3–8
- Head coach: Jack Bicknell (8th season)
- Defensive coordinator: Seymour "Red" Kelin (8th season)
- Captains: Joe Wolf; Mark Murphy
- Home stadium: Alumni Stadium

1988 Major eastern college football independents records
	Conf.					Overall
Team	W		L		T	W		L		T
No. 5 West Virginia $	5	–	0	–	0	11	–	1	–	0
No. 13 Syracuse	5	–	1	–	0	10	–	2	–	0
Pittsburgh	3	–	3	–	0	6	–	5	–	0
Temple	2	–	3	–	0	4	–	7	–	0
Rutgers	2	–	4	–	0	5	–	6	–	0
Penn State	2	–	4	–	0	5	–	6	–	0
Boston College	1	–	5	–	0	3	–	8	–	0
$ – Lambert Trophy Winner; Rankings from AP Poll

1988 NCAA Division I-A independents football records
	Conf.					Overall
Team	W		L		T	W		L		T
No. 1 Notre Dame		–		–		12	–	0	–	0
No. 2 Miami (FL)		–		–		11	–	1	–	0
No. 3 Florida State		–		–		11	–	1	–	0
No. 5 West Virginia		–		–		11	–	1	–	0
Southern Miss		–		–		10	–	2	–	0
No. 13 Syracuse		–		–		10	–	2	–	0
Army		–		–		9	–	3	–	0
Louisville		–		–		8	–	3	–	0
South Carolina		–		–		8	–	4	–	0
Northern Illinois		–		–		7	–	4	–	0
Pittsburgh		–		–		6	–	5	–	0
Memphis State		–		–		6	–	5	–	0
Southwestern Louisiana		–		–		6	–	5	–	0
Rutgers		–		–		5	–	6	–	0
Akron		–		–		5	–	6	–	0
Penn State		–		–		5	–	6	–	0
Tulane		–		–		5	–	6	–	0
Temple		–		–		4	–	7	–	0
Tulsa		–		–		4	–	7	–	0
Boston College		–		–		3	–	8	–	0
Cincinnati		–		–		3	–	8	–	0
East Carolina		–		–		3	–	8	–	0
Navy		–		–		3	–	8	–	0
Virginia Tech		–		–		3	–	8	–	0
Rankings from AP Poll

The 1988 Boston College Eagles football team represented Boston College as an independent during the 1988 NCAA Division I-A football season. The Eagles were led by eighth-year head coach Jack Bicknell, and played their home games at Alumni Stadium in Chestnut Hill, Massachusetts. On November 19, the team participated in one of the first American college football game played in Europe, in the Emerald Isle Classic, played in Dublin, Ireland.

== Schedule ==
Date	Opponent	Site	Result	Attendance	Source
September 1	No. 8 USC	Alumni Stadium; Chestnut Hill, MA	L 7–34	32,000	
September 10	Cincinnati	Alumni Stadium; Chestnut Hill, MA	W 41–7	29,279	
September 17	at No. 16 Penn State	Beaver Stadium; University Park, PA	L 20–23	84,000	
September 24	at TCU	Amon G. Carter Stadium; Fort Worth, TX	L 17–31	25,335	
October 1	Pittsburgh	Alumni Stadium; Chestnut Hill, MA	W 34–31	32,000	
October 15	Rutgers	Alumni Stadium; Chestnut Hill, MA	L 6–17	32,000	
October 22	at No. 6 West Virginia	Mountaineer Field; Morgantown, WV	L 19–59	63,145	
November 5	at Tennessee	Neyland Stadium; Knoxville, TN	L 7–10	90,030	
November 12	No. 15 Syracuse	Alumni Stadium; Chestnut Hill, MA	L 20–45	32,000	
November 19	vs. Army	Lansdowne Road; Dublin, Ireland (Emerald Isle Classic)	W 38–24	42,525	
November 26	at Temple	Veterans Stadium; Philadelphia, PA	L 28–45	12,892	
Rankings from AP Poll released prior to the game
