= 1988 Northern Illinois Huskies football team =

American college football season

1988 Northern Illinois Huskies football
- Conference: Independent
- Record: 7–4
- Head coach: Jerry Pettibone (4th season)
- Offensive coordinator: Mike Summers (1st season)
- Defensive coordinator: Tim McGuire (3rd season)
- MVPs: Mike Hollingshed; Bob Montel; Marshall Taylor
- Captains: Mike Hollingshed; Bob Montel; Marshall Taylor
- Home stadium: Huskie Stadium

1988 NCAA Division I-A independents football records
	Conf.					Overall
Team	W		L		T	W		L		T
No. 1 Notre Dame		–		–		12	–	0	–	0
No. 2 Miami (FL)		–		–		11	–	1	–	0
No. 3 Florida State		–		–		11	–	1	–	0
No. 5 West Virginia		–		–		11	–	1	–	0
Southern Miss		–		–		10	–	2	–	0
No. 13 Syracuse		–		–		10	–	2	–	0
Army		–		–		9	–	3	–	0
Louisville		–		–		8	–	3	–	0
South Carolina		–		–		8	–	4	–	0
Northern Illinois		–		–		7	–	4	–	0
Pittsburgh		–		–		6	–	5	–	0
Memphis State		–		–		6	–	5	–	0
Southwestern Louisiana		–		–		6	–	5	–	0
Rutgers		–		–		5	–	6	–	0
Akron		–		–		5	–	6	–	0
Penn State		–		–		5	–	6	–	0
Tulane		–		–		5	–	6	–	0
Temple		–		–		4	–	7	–	0
Tulsa		–		–		4	–	7	–	0
Boston College		–		–		3	–	8	–	0
Cincinnati		–		–		3	–	8	–	0
East Carolina		–		–		3	–	8	–	0
Navy		–		–		3	–	8	–	0
Virginia Tech		–		–		3	–	8	–	0
Rankings from AP Poll

The 1988 Northern Illinois Huskies football team represented Northern Illinois University as an independent during the 1988 NCAA Division I-A football season. Led by fourth-year head coach Jerry Pettibone, the Huskies compiled a record of 7–4. Northern Illinois played home games at Huskie Stadium in DeKalb, Illinois.

== Schedule ==
Date	Time	Opponent	Site	Result	Attendance	Source
September 3	6:30 pm	Akron	Huskie Stadium; DeKalb, IL	W 7–6	7,033	
September 10	6:30 pm	Middle Tennessee*	Huskie Stadium; DeKalb, IL	W 14–10	13,572	
September 17	1:00 pm	at Wisconsin*	Camp Randall Stadium; Madison, WI	W 19–17	46,869	
September 24	7:00 pm	at Minnesota*	Hubert H. Humphrey Metrodome; Minneapolis, MN	L 20–31	40,007	
October 1	1:00 pm	Southwest Missouri State*	Huskie Stadium; DeKalb, IL	W 17–3	14,127	
October 8	6:30 pm	at Toledo*	Glass Bowl; Toledo, OH	L 20–33	17,038	
October 15	4:00 pm	at Southwestern Louisiana	Cajun Field; Lafayette, LA	L 0–45	27,300	
October 22	1:30 pm	at Southern Illinois*	McAndrew Stadium; Carbondale, IL	W 10–9	13,000	
October 29	1:00 pm	Ball State*^{†}	Huskie Stadium; DeKalb, IL (rivalry)	L 17–18	15,049	
November 5	1:00 pm	No. 2 Western Illinois*	Huskie Stadium; DeKalb, IL	W 16–6	7,556	
November 12	1:00 pm	Western Michigan*	Huskie Stadium; DeKalb, IL	W 15–7	2,329	
*Non-conference game; ^{†}Homecoming; Rankings from NCAA Division I-AA Football Committee Poll released prior to the game; All times are in Central time
