= 1988 Southern Miss Golden Eagles football team =

American college football season

1988 Southern Miss Golden Eagles football

Independence Bowl champion

Independence Bowl, W 38–18 vs. UTEP
- Conference: Independent
- Record: 10–2
- Head coach: Curley Hallman (1st season)
- Offensive coordinator: Jeff Bower (1st season)
- Offensive scheme: I formation
- Defensive coordinator: Ellis Johnson (1st season)
- Base defense: 4–3
- Home stadium: M. M. Roberts Stadium

1988 NCAA Division I-A independents football records
	Conf.					Overall
Team	W		L		T	W		L		T
No. 1 Notre Dame		–		–		12	–	0	–	0
No. 2 Miami (FL)		–		–		11	–	1	–	0
No. 3 Florida State		–		–		11	–	1	–	0
No. 5 West Virginia		–		–		11	–	1	–	0
Southern Miss		–		–		10	–	2	–	0
No. 13 Syracuse		–		–		10	–	2	–	0
Army		–		–		9	–	3	–	0
Louisville		–		–		8	–	3	–	0
South Carolina		–		–		8	–	4	–	0
Northern Illinois		–		–		7	–	4	–	0
Pittsburgh		–		–		6	–	5	–	0
Memphis State		–		–		6	–	5	–	0
Southwestern Louisiana		–		–		6	–	5	–	0
Rutgers		–		–		5	–	6	–	0
Akron		–		–		5	–	6	–	0
Penn State		–		–		5	–	6	–	0
Tulane		–		–		5	–	6	–	0
Temple		–		–		4	–	7	–	0
Tulsa		–		–		4	–	7	–	0
Boston College		–		–		3	–	8	–	0
Cincinnati		–		–		3	–	8	–	0
East Carolina		–		–		3	–	8	–	0
Navy		–		–		3	–	8	–	0
Virginia Tech		–		–		3	–	8	–	0
Rankings from AP Poll

The 1988 Southern Miss Golden Eagles football team was an American football team that represented the University of Southern Mississippi as an independent during the 1988 NCAA Division I-A football season. In their first year under head coach Curley Hallman, the team compiled a 10–2 record and won the 1988 Independence Bowl.

== Schedule ==
Date	Opponent	Site	Result	Attendance	Source
September 3	Stephen F. Austin	M. M. Roberts Stadium; Hattiesburg, MS	W 21–7	15,032	
September 10	at No. 10 Florida State	Doak Campbell Stadium; Tallahassee, FL	L 13–49	53,129	
September 17	Virginia Tech	M. M. Roberts Stadium; Hattiesburg, MS	W 35–13	17,135	
September 24	at East Carolina	Ficklen Memorial Stadium; Greenville, NC	W 45–42	28,240	
October 1	Louisville	M. M. Roberts Stadium; Hattiesburg, MS	W 30–23	17,584	
October 8	at Tulane	Louisiana Superdome; New Orleans, LA (rivalry)	W 38–13	22,704	
October 15	vs. Mississippi State	Mississippi Veterans Memorial Stadium; Jackson, MS	W 38–21	38,542	
October 22	at Southwestern Louisiana	Cajun Field; Lafayette, LA	W 27–14	23,599	
October 29	Memphis State^{†}	M. M. Roberts Stadium; Hattiesburg, MS (rivalry)	W 34–27	25,594	
November 5	at No. 9 Auburn	Jordan–Hare Stadium; Auburn, AL	L 8–38	73,787	
November 12	at Louisiana Tech	Joe Aillet Stadium; Ruston, LA (rivalry)	W 26–19	7,500	
December 23	vs. UTEP	Independence Stadium; Shreveport, LA (Independence Bowl)	W 38–18	20,242	
^{†}Homecoming; Rankings from AP Poll released prior to the game

== Roster ==
1988 Southern Miss Golden Eagles football team roster
Players			Coaches
Offense: Pos. / # / Name / Class; D B / 4 / David Dawkins / So	Defense: Pos. / # / Name / Class	Special teams: Pos. / # / Name / Class	Head coach: Curley Hallman; Coordinators/assistant coaches Legend: (C) Team captain; (S) Suspended; (I) Ineligible; Injured; Redshirt
