= 1988 Akron Zips football team =

American college football season

1988 Akron Zips football
- Conference: Independent
- Record: 5–6
- Head coach: Gerry Faust (3rd season)
- Defensive coordinator: Bob Junko (1st season)
- Home stadium: Rubber Bowl

1988 NCAA Division I-A independents football records
	Conf.					Overall
Team	W		L		T	W		L		T
No. 1 Notre Dame		–		–		12	–	0	–	0
No. 2 Miami (FL)		–		–		11	–	1	–	0
No. 3 Florida State		–		–		11	–	1	–	0
No. 5 West Virginia		–		–		11	–	1	–	0
Southern Miss		–		–		10	–	2	–	0
No. 13 Syracuse		–		–		10	–	2	–	0
Army		–		–		9	–	3	–	0
Louisville		–		–		8	–	3	–	0
South Carolina		–		–		8	–	4	–	0
Northern Illinois		–		–		7	–	4	–	0
Pittsburgh		–		–		6	–	5	–	0
Memphis State		–		–		6	–	5	–	0
Southwestern Louisiana		–		–		6	–	5	–	0
Rutgers		–		–		5	–	6	–	0
Akron		–		–		5	–	6	–	0
Penn State		–		–		5	–	6	–	0
Tulane		–		–		5	–	6	–	0
Temple		–		–		4	–	7	–	0
Tulsa		–		–		4	–	7	–	0
Boston College		–		–		3	–	8	–	0
Cincinnati		–		–		3	–	8	–	0
East Carolina		–		–		3	–	8	–	0
Navy		–		–		3	–	8	–	0
Virginia Tech		–		–		3	–	8	–	0
Rankings from AP Poll

The 1988 Akron Zips football team represented Akron University in the 1988 NCAA Division I-A football season as Division I-A independents. They were led by third-year head coach Gerry Faust. The Zips played their home games at the Rubber Bowl in Akron, Ohio. They finished the season with a record of 5–6.

== Schedule ==
Date	Opponent	Site	Result	Attendance	Source
September 3	at Northern Illinois	Huskie Stadium; DeKalb, IL	L 6–7	7,033	
September 10	at Kent State	Dix Stadium; Kent, OH (Wagon Wheel)	L 12–32	23,500	
September 17	Central Michigan	Rubber Bowl; Akron, OH	L 16–27	19,124	
September 24	at New Mexico	University Stadium; Albuquerque, NM	W 30–28	11,740	
October 1	at Youngstown State	Stambaugh Stadium; Youngstown, OH (Steel Tire)	W 33–7	13,231	
October 8	Arkansas State	Rubber Bowl; Akron, OH	L 12–13	9,463	
October 15	at No. 12 Auburn	Jordan-Hare Stadium; Auburn, AL	L 0–42	61,300	
October 22	Long Beach State	Rubber Bowl; Akron, OH	W 40–0	8,132	
October 29	Cal State Fullerton	Rubber Bowl; Akron, OH	W 15–14	4,049	
November 5	New Mexico State	Rubber Bowl; Akron, OH	W 52–7	6,147	
November 12	Temple	Rubber Bowl; Akron, OH	L 17–37	6,088	
Rankings from AP Poll released prior to the game
