= 1988 Army Cadets football team =

American college football season

1988 Army Cadets football

Sun Bowl, L 29–28 vs. Alabama
- Conference: Independent
- Record: 9–3
- Head coach: Jim Young (6th season)
- Offensive scheme: Triple option
- Defensive coordinator: Bob Sutton (6th season)
- Base defense: 4–3
- Captains: Chris Destito; Troy Lingley
- Home stadium: Michie Stadium

1988 NCAA Division I-A independents football records
	Conf.					Overall
Team	W		L		T	W		L		T
No. 1 Notre Dame		–		–		12	–	0	–	0
No. 2 Miami (FL)		–		–		11	–	1	–	0
No. 3 Florida State		–		–		11	–	1	–	0
No. 5 West Virginia		–		–		11	–	1	–	0
Southern Miss		–		–		10	–	2	–	0
No. 13 Syracuse		–		–		10	–	2	–	0
Army		–		–		9	–	3	–	0
Louisville		–		–		8	–	3	–	0
South Carolina		–		–		8	–	4	–	0
Northern Illinois		–		–		7	–	4	–	0
Pittsburgh		–		–		6	–	5	–	0
Memphis State		–		–		6	–	5	–	0
Southwestern Louisiana		–		–		6	–	5	–	0
Rutgers		–		–		5	–	6	–	0
Akron		–		–		5	–	6	–	0
Penn State		–		–		5	–	6	–	0
Tulane		–		–		5	–	6	–	0
Temple		–		–		4	–	7	–	0
Tulsa		–		–		4	–	7	–	0
Boston College		–		–		3	–	8	–	0
Cincinnati		–		–		3	–	8	–	0
East Carolina		–		–		3	–	8	–	0
Navy		–		–		3	–	8	–	0
Virginia Tech		–		–		3	–	8	–	0
Rankings from AP Poll

The 1988 Army Cadets football team was an American football team that represented the United States Military Academy as an independent during the 1988 NCAA Division I-A football season. In their sixth season under head coach Jim Young, the Cadets compiled a 9–3 record and outscored their opponents by a combined total of 336 to 226. In the annual Army–Navy Game, the Cadets defeated Navy, 20–15. They also lost a close game to Alabama, 29–28, in the 1988 Sun Bowl.

== Schedule ==
Date	Time	Opponent	Site	TV	Result	Attendance	Source
September 10		No. 1 (I-AA) Holy Cross	Michie Stadium; West Point, NY		W 23–3	33,136	
September 17		at No. 17 Washington	Husky Stadium; Seattle, WA		L 17–31	66,128	
September 24	1:30 p.m.	Northwestern	Michie Stadium; West Point, NY		W 23–7	36,978	
October 1		Bucknell	Michie Stadium; West Point, NY		W 58–10	38,924	
October 8		at Yale	Yale Bowl; New Haven, CT		W 33–18	17,898	
October 15		No. 5 (I-AA) Lafayette	Michie Stadium; West Point, NY		W 24–17	40,570	
October 22		at Rutgers	Giants Stadium; East Rutherford, NJ		W 34–24	31,318	
November 5		Air Force	Michie Stadium; West Point, NY (Commander-in-Chief's Trophy)		W 28–15	40,660	
November 12		Vanderbilt	Michie Stadium; West Point, NY		W 24–19	40,339	
November 19		vs. Boston College	Lansdowne Road; Dublin, Ireland (Emerald Isle Classic)	ESPN	L 24–38	42,525	
December 3		vs. Navy	Veterans Stadium; Philadelphia, PA (Army–Navy Game)	CBS	W 20–15	68,435	
December 24	12:00 p.m.	vs. No. 20 Alabama	Sun Bowl Stadium; El Paso, TX (Sun Bowl)	CBS	L 28–29	48,719	
Rankings from AP Poll released prior to the game; All times are in Eastern time

== Game summaries ==
=== Air Force ===
Mike Mayweather rushed for 192 yards and one touchdown while Bryan McWilliams added two scores on the ground.

External videos
- Army highlights

=== vs Navy ===
Army Cadets vs. Navy Midshipmen

Quarter	1	2	3	4	Total
Army	0	10	3	7	20
Navy	3	3	3	6	15

at Veterans Stadium • Philadelphia, Pennsylvania

- Date: December 3
- Game attendance: 68,435
- Washington Post

Game information

Army

- Bryan McWilliams
  2/30, 30 Yds
  21 Rush, 100 Yds, TD
- Sean Jordan
  1 Rec, 13 Yds

Navy

- Alton Grizzard
  7/15, 77 Yds
  20 Rush, 62 Yds
- Luther Archer
  4 Rec, 28 Yds

Army wins the Commander-in-Chief's Trophy

Scoring summary

Quarter	Time	Drive			Team	Scoring information	Score	
Quarter	Time	Plays	Yards	TOP	Team	Scoring information	ARMY	NAVY
1	3:44	7	38		Navy	44-yard field goal by Fundoukas	0	3
2	12:05	16	63		Army	Barnett 1-yard touchdown run, Walker kick good	7	3
2	3:57				Navy	34-yard field goal by Fundoukas	7	6
2					Army	22-yard field goal by Walker	10	6
3	5:38				Army	35-yard field goal by Walker	13	6
3					Navy	34-yard field goal by Fundoukas	13	9
4		12	60	5:25	Army	McWilliams 8-yard touchdown run, Walker kick good	20	9
4	1:35				Navy	Bradley 2-yard touchdown run, 2-point pass failed	20	15
"TOP" = time of possession. For other American football terms, see Glossary of American football.							20	15

External videos
- Army highlights

== Roster ==
1988 Army Cadets football team roster
Players
Coaches
Offense

Pos.	#	Name	Class
QB		Bryan Babb
TE		Doug Baker	So
FB		Ben Barnett	Jr
RB		John Barth
OT	72	Mike Braun
OL		Frank Brunner
RB		Paul Capriotti
RB		Calvin Cass	So
WR		Chris Destito
RB		Dave Foye
OL		Jack Frey
OL		Bill Gebhards
WR		Sean Jordan
OL		Mike Karsonovich
QB	2	Otto Leone
RB		Pat Mangin
RB		Mike Mayweather	So
QB		Willie McMillian
QB	9	Bryan McWilliams	So
QB		Mark Mooney
WR		Todd Mulville
RB		Edrian Oliver
WR		Mike Phillips
OL		Carlton Rice
QB		Morrell Savoy
RB		Tom Schermerhorn
RB		Callian Thomas
RB		Robert Westbrook
QB		Myreon Williams

Defense

Pos.	#	Name	Class
DB	37	Earnest Boyd	Sr
DL		Jon Brunner
DL		Dan Cooney
LB		Pat Davie
LB		Greg Gadson
DL		Josh Haines
DL		Will Huff
LB	45	Troy Lingley
DB		O'Neal Miller
LB		Anthony Noto
LB	48	Mike O'Toole
LB		John Robb
DB		Darryl Schreb
LB		Chuck Schretzman
DB		Mike Thorson

Special teams

Pos.	#	Name	Class
P		Bit Rambusch
K	4	Keith Walker

Head coach

- Jim Young

Coordinators/assistant coaches

- Jack Hecker

Legend

- (C) Team captain
- (S) Suspended
- (I) Ineligible
- Injured
- Redshirt
