= 1988 Cincinnati Bearcats football team =

American college football season

1988 Cincinnati Bearcats football
- Conference: Independent
- Record: 3–8
- Head coach: Dave Currey (5th season)
- Defensive coordinator: Dave Ritchie (2nd season)
- Home stadium: Nippert Stadium

1988 NCAA Division I-A independents football records
	Conf.					Overall
Team	W		L		T	W		L		T
No. 1 Notre Dame		–		–		12	–	0	–	0
No. 2 Miami (FL)		–		–		11	–	1	–	0
No. 3 Florida State		–		–		11	–	1	–	0
No. 5 West Virginia		–		–		11	–	1	–	0
Southern Miss		–		–		10	–	2	–	0
No. 13 Syracuse		–		–		10	–	2	–	0
Army		–		–		9	–	3	–	0
Louisville		–		–		8	–	3	–	0
South Carolina		–		–		8	–	4	–	0
Northern Illinois		–		–		7	–	4	–	0
Pittsburgh		–		–		6	–	5	–	0
Memphis State		–		–		6	–	5	–	0
Southwestern Louisiana		–		–		6	–	5	–	0
Rutgers		–		–		5	–	6	–	0
Akron		–		–		5	–	6	–	0
Penn State		–		–		5	–	6	–	0
Tulane		–		–		5	–	6	–	0
Temple		–		–		4	–	7	–	0
Tulsa		–		–		4	–	7	–	0
Boston College		–		–		3	–	8	–	0
Cincinnati		–		–		3	–	8	–	0
East Carolina		–		–		3	–	8	–	0
Navy		–		–		3	–	8	–	0
Virginia Tech		–		–		3	–	8	–	0
Rankings from AP Poll

The 1988 Cincinnati Bearcats football team represented the University of Cincinnati during the 1988 NCAA Division I-A football season. The Bearcats, led by head coach Dave Currey, participated as independent and played their home games at Nippert Stadium.

== Schedule ==
Date	Opponent	Site	Result	Attendance	Source
September 10	at Boston College	Alumni Stadium; Chestnut Hill, MA	L 7–41	29,279	
September 17	Austin Peay	Nippert Stadium; Cincinnati, OH	W 52–7	12,373	
September 24	at Miami (OH)	Yager Stadium; Oxford, OH (Victory Bell)	W 34–18	26,039	
October 1	at Rutgers	Rutgers Stadium; Piscataway, NJ	L 9–38	23,899	
October 8	at Penn State	Beaver Stadium; University Park, PA	L 9–35	85,693	
October 15	Virginia Tech	Nippert Stadium; Cincinnati, OH	L 14–41	11,217	
October 22	at No. 4 Miami (FL)	Miami Orange Bowl; Miami, FL	L 3–57	44,107	
October 29	Louisville	Nippert Stadium; Cincinnati, OH (The Keg of Nails)	L 6–21	19,193	
November 5	No. 4 West Virginia	Riverfront Stadium; Cincinnati, OH	L 13–51	21,511	
November 12	Indiana State	Nippert Stadium; Cincinnati, OH	W 40–21	6,869	
November 19	East Carolina	Nippert Stadium; Cincinnati, OH	L 14–49	2,364	
Rankings from AP Poll released prior to the game

== Roster ==
1988 Cincinnati Bearcats football team roster
Players
Coaches
Offense

Pos.	#	Name	Class
QB	14	Don Hoog	Fr
FB	41	Doug Hoog	Fr
QB	16	Carl Johnson	Jr
TE	84	Chris Kohl	So

Defense

Pos.	#	Name	Class
DT	85	Chris Asbeck	Sr
S	5	Mavin Bowman	Jr
LB	55	Jack Bruscianelli	Jr
CB	2	Jackie Cooper	Jr
DE	99	Andrew Stewart	Sr
DT	93	John Thornton	So

Special teams

Pos.	#	Name	Class

Head coach

- Dave Currey

Coordinators/assistant coaches

Legend

- (C) Team captain
- (S) Suspended
- (I) Ineligible
- Injured
- Redshirt
