= 1988 East Carolina Pirates football team =

American college football season

1988 East Carolina Pirates football
- Conference: Independent
- Record: 3–8
- Head coach: Art Baker (4th season)
- Offensive coordinator: Kevin Gilbride (1st season)
- Offensive scheme: Run and shoot
- Defensive coordinator: Richard Bell (1st season)
- Base defense: 4–3
- Home stadium: Ficklen Memorial Stadium

1988 NCAA Division I-A independents football records
	Conf.					Overall
Team	W		L		T	W		L		T
No. 1 Notre Dame		–		–		12	–	0	–	0
No. 2 Miami (FL)		–		–		11	–	1	–	0
No. 3 Florida State		–		–		11	–	1	–	0
No. 5 West Virginia		–		–		11	–	1	–	0
Southern Miss		–		–		10	–	2	–	0
No. 13 Syracuse		–		–		10	–	2	–	0
Army		–		–		9	–	3	–	0
Louisville		–		–		8	–	3	–	0
South Carolina		–		–		8	–	4	–	0
Northern Illinois		–		–		7	–	4	–	0
Pittsburgh		–		–		6	–	5	–	0
Memphis State		–		–		6	–	5	–	0
Southwestern Louisiana		–		–		6	–	5	–	0
Rutgers		–		–		5	–	6	–	0
Akron		–		–		5	–	6	–	0
Penn State		–		–		5	–	6	–	0
Tulane		–		–		5	–	6	–	0
Temple		–		–		4	–	7	–	0
Tulsa		–		–		4	–	7	–	0
Boston College		–		–		3	–	8	–	0
Cincinnati		–		–		3	–	8	–	0
East Carolina		–		–		3	–	8	–	0
Navy		–		–		3	–	8	–	0
Virginia Tech		–		–		3	–	8	–	0
Rankings from AP Poll

The 1988 East Carolina Pirates football team was an American football team that represented East Carolina University as an independent during the 1988 NCAA Division I-A football season. In their fourth and final season under head coach Art Baker, the team compiled a 3–8 record.

== Schedule ==
Date	Opponent	Site	TV	Result	Attendance	Source
September 3	Tennessee Tech	Ficklen Memorial Stadium; Greenville, NC		W 52–13	29,702	
September 10	at Virginia Tech	Lane Stadium; Blacksburg, VA		L 16–27	37,200	
September 17	at No. 14 South Carolina	Williams–Brice Stadium; Columbia, SC		L 0–17	66,000	
September 24	Southern Miss	Ficklen Memorial Stadium; Greenville, NC		L 42–45	28,240	
October 1	Southwestern Louisiana	Ficklen Memorial Stadium; Greenville, NC		L 36–48	18,750	
October 8	No. 7 West Virginia	Ficklen Memorial Stadium; Greenville, NC	WITN	L 10–30	33,786	
October 15	at No. 5 Florida State	Doak Campbell Stadium; Tallahassee, FL	WITN	L 21–45	56,391	
October 22	No. 19 Syracuse	Ficklen Memorial Stadium; Greenville, NC	WITN	L 14–38	16,450	
October 29	No. 4 Miami (FL)	Ficklen Memorial Stadium; Greenville, NC		L 7–31	29,400	
November 5	at Temple	Veterans Stadium; Philadelphia, PA		W 34–17	8,018	
November 19	at Cincinnati	Nippert Stadium; Cincinnati, OH		W 49–14	2,364	
Rankings from AP Poll released prior to the game
