= 1988 Memphis State Tigers football team =

American college football season

1988 Memphis State Tigers football
- Conference: Independent
- Record: 6–5
- Head coach: Charlie Bailey (3rd season)
- Offensive coordinator: Darrell Dickey (1st season)
- Defensive coordinator: Pete Kuharchek (2nd season)
- Home stadium: Liberty Bowl Memorial Stadium

1988 NCAA Division I-A independents football records
	Conf.					Overall
Team	W		L		T	W		L		T
No. 1 Notre Dame		–		–		12	–	0	–	0
No. 2 Miami (FL)		–		–		11	–	1	–	0
No. 3 Florida State		–		–		11	–	1	–	0
No. 5 West Virginia		–		–		11	–	1	–	0
Southern Miss		–		–		10	–	2	–	0
No. 13 Syracuse		–		–		10	–	2	–	0
Army		–		–		9	–	3	–	0
Louisville		–		–		8	–	3	–	0
South Carolina		–		–		8	–	4	–	0
Northern Illinois		–		–		7	–	4	–	0
Pittsburgh		–		–		6	–	5	–	0
Memphis State		–		–		6	–	5	–	0
Southwestern Louisiana		–		–		6	–	5	–	0
Rutgers		–		–		5	–	6	–	0
Akron		–		–		5	–	6	–	0
Penn State		–		–		5	–	6	–	0
Tulane		–		–		5	–	6	–	0
Temple		–		–		4	–	7	–	0
Tulsa		–		–		4	–	7	–	0
Boston College		–		–		3	–	8	–	0
Cincinnati		–		–		3	–	8	–	0
East Carolina		–		–		3	–	8	–	0
Navy		–		–		3	–	8	–	0
Virginia Tech		–		–		3	–	8	–	0
Rankings from AP Poll

The 1988 Memphis Tigers football team represented Memphis State University (now known as the University of Memphis) in the 1988 NCAA Division I-A football season. The team was led by head coach Charlie Bailey. The Tigers played their home games at the Liberty Bowl Memorial Stadium.

== Schedule ==
Date	Opponent	Site	Result	Attendance	Source
September 3	at Ole Miss	Vaught–Hemingway Stadium; Oxford, MS (rivalry)	L 6–24	32,036	
September 10	Arkansas State	Liberty Bowl Memorial Stadium; Memphis, TN (Paint Bucket Bowl)	W 9–7	28,505	
September 17	at Louisville	Cardinal Stadium; Louisville, KY (rivalry)	L 18–29	22,476	
September 24	at Tulane	Louisiana Superdome; New Orleans, LA	L 19–20	26,426	
October 1	Mississippi State^{†}	Liberty Bowl Memorial Stadium; Memphis, TN	W 31–10	36,601	
October 8	at No. 14 Florida	Florida Field; Gainesville, FL	W 17–11	73,194	
October 22	Tennessee	Liberty Bowl Memorial Stadium; Memphis, TN	L 25–38	55,173	
October 29	at Southern Miss	M. M. Roberts Stadium; Hattiesburg, MS (Black and Blue Bowl)	L 27–34	25,594	
November 5	Southwestern Louisiana	Liberty Bowl Memorial Stadium; Memphis, TN	W 20–3	18,174	
November 12	Tulsa	Liberty Bowl Memorial Stadium; Memphis, TN	W 26–20	8,213	
November 19	Vanderbilt	Liberty Bowl Memorial Stadium; Memphis, TN	W 28–9	21,212	
^{†}Homecoming; Rankings from AP Poll released prior to the game
