= 1988 Rutgers Scarlet Knights football team =

American college football season

1988 Rutgers Scarlet Knights football
- Conference: Independent
- Record: 5–6
- Head coach: Dick Anderson (5th season)
- Offensive coordinator: Dick Curl (6th season)
- Defensive coordinator: Otto Kneidinger (5th season)
- Home stadium: Rutgers Stadium; Giants Stadium

1988 Major eastern college football independents records
	Conf.					Overall
Team	W		L		T	W		L		T
No. 5 West Virginia $	5	–	0	–	0	11	–	1	–	0
No. 13 Syracuse	5	–	1	–	0	10	–	2	–	0
Pittsburgh	3	–	3	–	0	6	–	5	–	0
Temple	2	–	3	–	0	4	–	7	–	0
Rutgers	2	–	4	–	0	5	–	6	–	0
Penn State	2	–	4	–	0	5	–	6	–	0
Boston College	1	–	5	–	0	3	–	8	–	0
$ – Lambert Trophy Winner; Rankings from AP Poll

1988 NCAA Division I-A independents football records
	Conf.					Overall
Team	W		L		T	W		L		T
No. 1 Notre Dame		–		–		12	–	0	–	0
No. 2 Miami (FL)		–		–		11	–	1	–	0
No. 3 Florida State		–		–		11	–	1	–	0
No. 5 West Virginia		–		–		11	–	1	–	0
Southern Miss		–		–		10	–	2	–	0
No. 13 Syracuse		–		–		10	–	2	–	0
Army		–		–		9	–	3	–	0
Louisville		–		–		8	–	3	–	0
South Carolina		–		–		8	–	4	–	0
Northern Illinois		–		–		7	–	4	–	0
Pittsburgh		–		–		6	–	5	–	0
Memphis State		–		–		6	–	5	–	0
Southwestern Louisiana		–		–		6	–	5	–	0
Rutgers		–		–		5	–	6	–	0
Akron		–		–		5	–	6	–	0
Penn State		–		–		5	–	6	–	0
Tulane		–		–		5	–	6	–	0
Temple		–		–		4	–	7	–	0
Tulsa		–		–		4	–	7	–	0
Boston College		–		–		3	–	8	–	0
Cincinnati		–		–		3	–	8	–	0
East Carolina		–		–		3	–	8	–	0
Navy		–		–		3	–	8	–	0
Virginia Tech		–		–		3	–	8	–	0
Rankings from AP Poll

The 1988 Rutgers Scarlet Knights football team represented Rutgers University as an independent during the 1988 NCAA Division I-A football season. In their fifth season under head coach Dick Anderson, the Scarlet Knights compiled a 5–6 record while competing as an independent and outscored their opponents 273 to 255. They won games against two ranked opponents, Michigan State and Penn State. The team's statistical leaders included Scott Erney with 2,123 passing yards, Mike Botti with 715 rushing yards, and Eric Young with 592 receiving yards.

== Schedule ==
Date	Opponent	Site	Result	Attendance	Source
September 10	at No. 15 Michigan State	Spartan Stadium; East Lansing, MI	W 17–13	70,693	
September 17	Vanderbilt	Giants Stadium; East Rutherford, NJ	L 30–31	23,477	
September 24	at No. 15 Penn State	Beaver Stadium; University Park, PA	W 21–16	85,531	
October 1	Cincinnati	Rutgers Stadium; Piscataway, NJ	W 38–9	23,899	
October 8	at Syracuse	Carrier Dome; Syracuse, NY	L 20–34	48,798	
October 15	at Boston College	Alumni Stadium; Chestnut Hill, MA	W 17–6	32,000	
October 22	Army	Giants Stadium; East Rutherford, NJ	L 24–34	31,318	
October 29	Temple	Rutgers Stadium; Piscataway, NJ	L 30–35	31,219	
November 5	at Pittsburgh	Pitt Stadium; Pittsburgh, PA	L 10–20	20,051	
November 12	No. 4 West Virginia	Giants Stadium; East Rutherford, NJ	L 25–35	32,517	
November 19	Colgate	Rutgers Stadium; Piscataway, NJ	W 41–22	14,415	
Rankings from AP Poll released prior to the game
