= Keith Karpinski =

American football player (born 1966)

No. 90
- Position: Linebacker

Personal information
- Born: October 12, 1966 (age 60); Southfield, Michigan, U.S.
- Listed height: 6 ft 3 in (1.91 m)
- Listed weight: 255 lb (116 kg)

Career information
- High school: De La Salle Collegiate (Detroit/Warren, Michigan)
- College: Penn State
- NFL draft: 1989: 11th round, 282nd overall pick

Career history
- Detroit Lions (1989)

Awards and highlights
- National champion (1986)
- Stats at Pro Football Reference

Keith Carl Karpinski (born October 12, 1966) is an American former professional football player who was a linebacker in the National Football League (NFL). He played college football for the Penn State Nittany Lions before playing in the NFL for the Detroit Lions in 1989.

== College career ==
Karpinski attended and played college football for the Penn State Nittany Lions from 1984 to 1988.

== Professional career ==
Karpinski was selected in the 11th round (#282 overall) of the 1989 NFL draft by the Detroit Lions.

== Personal life ==
Karpinski was a principal at Thomas Jefferson Elementary School in Sterling Heights, Michigan. Karpinski and his wife Marilyn have two daughters.
