= Cornell Holloway =

American football player (born 1966)

No. 25
- Position: Defensive back

Personal information
- Born: January 30, 1966 (age 60); Alliance, Ohio, U.S.
- Listed height: 5 ft 11 in (1.80 m)
- Listed weight: 185 lb (84 kg)

Career information
- High school: Alliance
- College: Pittsburgh
- NFL draft: 1989: 10th round, 256th overall pick

Career history
- Cincinnati Bengals (1989)*; Indianapolis Colts (1989–1992); Pittsburgh Steelers (1993)*
- * Offseason or practice squad member only

Career NFL statistics
- Interceptions: 1
- Sacks: 1
- Stats at Pro Football Reference

Cornell Holloway (born January 30, 1966) is an American former professional football player who was a defensive back in the National Football League (NFL). He played for the Indianapolis Colts from 1990 to 1992. He played college football for the Pittsburgh Panthers and was selected by the Cincinnati Bengals in the 10th round of the 1989 NFL draft with the 256th overall pick.
