= Mike Clark (American football coach, Bridgewater) =

American football coach

Biographical details
- Born: Youngstown, Ohio, U.S.

Playing career
- 1976–1979: Cincinnati

Coaching career (HC unless noted)
- 1980–1985: Murray State (DL/LB)
- 1986–1987: Cincinnati (WR)
- 1988–1992: Virginia Tech (DC)
- 1993–1994: VMI (QB/DC)
- 1995–2021: Bridgewater

Head coaching record
- Overall: 166–103–1
- Tournaments: 10–7 (NCAA D-III playoffs)

Accomplishments and honors

Championships
- 6 ODAC (2001–2005, 2019)

Michael Clark is an American former football coach He served as the head football coach at Bridgewater College in Bridgewater, Virginia from 1995 to 2021, compiling a record of 166–103–1. While at Bridgewater, he has led a remarkable turnaround of a historically struggling program. In 2001, he led Bridgewater to the NCAA Division III National Championship game, which they narrowly lost to Mount Union, 30–27. Clark's 2001 Bridgewater team is the only Old Dominion Athletic Conference (ODAC) team to appear in the NCAA Division III National Championship title game. Clark retired after the spring season in 2021.

Clark played college football at the University of Cincinnati from 1976 to 1979.

== Head coaching record ==
| Year | Team | Overall | Conference | Standing | Bowl/playoffs | D3^{#} |
|---|---|---|---|---|---|---|
Bridgewater Eagles (Old Dominion Athletic Conference) (1995–2021)
| 1995 | Bridgewater | 0–9–1 | 0–5 | 6th | | |
| 1996 | Bridgewater | 5–5 | 3–2 | T–2nd | | |
| 1997 | Bridgewater | 2–8 | 1–4 | 5th | | |
| 1998 | Bridgewater | 0–10 | 0–5 | 6th | | |
| 1999 | Bridgewater | 5–5 | 3–3 | 4th | | |
| 2000 | Bridgewater | 10–2 | 5–1 | 2nd | L NCAA Division III Second Round | 15 |
| 2001 | Bridgewater | 12–1 | 6–0 | 1st | L NCAA Division III Championship | 2 |
| 2002 | Bridgewater | 11–1 | 6–0 | 1st | L NCAA Division III Quarterfinal | |
| 2003 | Bridgewater | 12–2 | 6–0 | 1st | L NCAA Division III Semifinal | 7 |
| 2004 | Bridgewater | 8–3 | 6–0 | 1st | L NCAA Division III First Round | 17 |
| 2005 | Bridgewater | 10–2 | 6–0 | 1st | L NCAA Division III Quarterfinal | 12 |
| 2006 | Bridgewater | 8–2 | 4–2 | T–2nd | | |
| 2007 | Bridgewater | 7–3 | 3–3 | 4th | | |
| 2008 | Bridgewater | 4–6 | 3–3 | 5th | | |
| 2009 | Bridgewater | 7–3 | 4–2 | T–2nd | | |
| 2010 | Bridgewater | 8–2 | 4–2 | 3rd | | |
| 2011 | Bridgewater | 6–4 | 3–3 | 4th | | |
| 2012 | Bridgewater | 7–3 | 4–3 | T–3rd | | |
| 2013 | Bridgewater | 4–6 | 1–6 | 8th | | |
| 2014 | Bridgewater | 8–2 | 5–2 | T–1st | | |
| 2015 | Bridgewater | 4–6 | 2–5 | 6th | | |
| 2016 | Bridgewater | 5–5 | 4–3 | T–4th | | |
| 2017 | Bridgewater | 4–6 | 1–5 | T–6th | | |
| 2018 | Bridgewater | 6–4 | 4–3 | T–2nd | | |
| 2019 | Bridgewater | 10–1 | 8–0 | 1st | L NCAA Division III First Round | 20 |
| 2020–21 | Bridgewater | 3–2 | 1–2 | T–5th | | |
| Bridgewater: | | 166–103–1 | 93–64 | | | |
| Total: | | 166–103–1 | | | | |
National championship Conference title Conference division title or championship game berth
