= Bob Brush (American football) =

American football coach (born c. 1943–1944)

Biographical details
- Born: c. 1943 or 1944 (age 82–83); Cherry Hill, New Jersey, U.S.
- Education: Rutgers University (1966)

Playing career
- 1962–1965: Rutgers
- Positions: Linebacker, fullback

Coaching career (HC unless noted)
- 1966–1968: Cherry Hill HS East (NJ)
- 1969: Maryland (GA)
- 1970: Maryland (WR)
- 1971–1974: VMI (RB)
- 1975–1976: Duke (LB)
- 1977–1981: Southwest Texas State (DC)
- 1982–1983: Vanderbilt (DC)
- 1984–1986: Virginia Tech (DC)
- 1987–1988: Tulsa (DC)
- 1989–1992: Wake Forest (DC/LB)
- 1993–1996: Georgetown (KY)
- 1997–1998: Kentucky (DA)
- 1999–2000: Wingate
- 2003: Port City Diesel

Head coaching record
- Overall: 24–37 (college); 7–4 (semipro)
- Tournaments: 0–1 (NAIA D-II playoffs)

Accomplishments and honors

Championships
- 1 MSC (1993)

Robert Brush (born c. 1943 or 1944) is an American former college football coach. He was the head football coach for Cherry Hill High School East from 1966 to 1968, Georgetown College from 1993 to 1996, Wingate University from 1999 to 2000, and for the semiprofessional Port City Diesel in 2003. He also coached for Maryland, VMI, Duke, Southwest Texas State, Vanderbilt, Virginia Tech, Tulsa, Wake Forest, and Kentucky. He played college football for Rutgers as a linebacker and fullback.

== Head coaching record ==
=== College ===
Year	Team	Overall	Conference	Standing	Bowl/playoffs	NAIA D2^{#}
Georgetown Tigers (Mid-South Conference) (1993–1996)
1993	Georgetown	7–4	4–1	1st	L NAIA Division II First Round	17
1994	Georgetown	3–6	3–2	T–2nd		
1995	Georgetown	6–4	6–2	3rd		
1996	Georgetown	4–5	3–4	T–4th		
Georgetown:		20–19	16–9			
Wingate Bulldogs (South Atlantic Conference) (1999–2000)
1999	Wingate	3–8	2–6	T–7th		
2000	Wingate	1–10	0–7	8th		
Wingate:		4–18	2–13			
Total:		24–37				
National championship Conference title Conference division title or championship game berth
