= 1989 NFL draft =

Selection of college football players

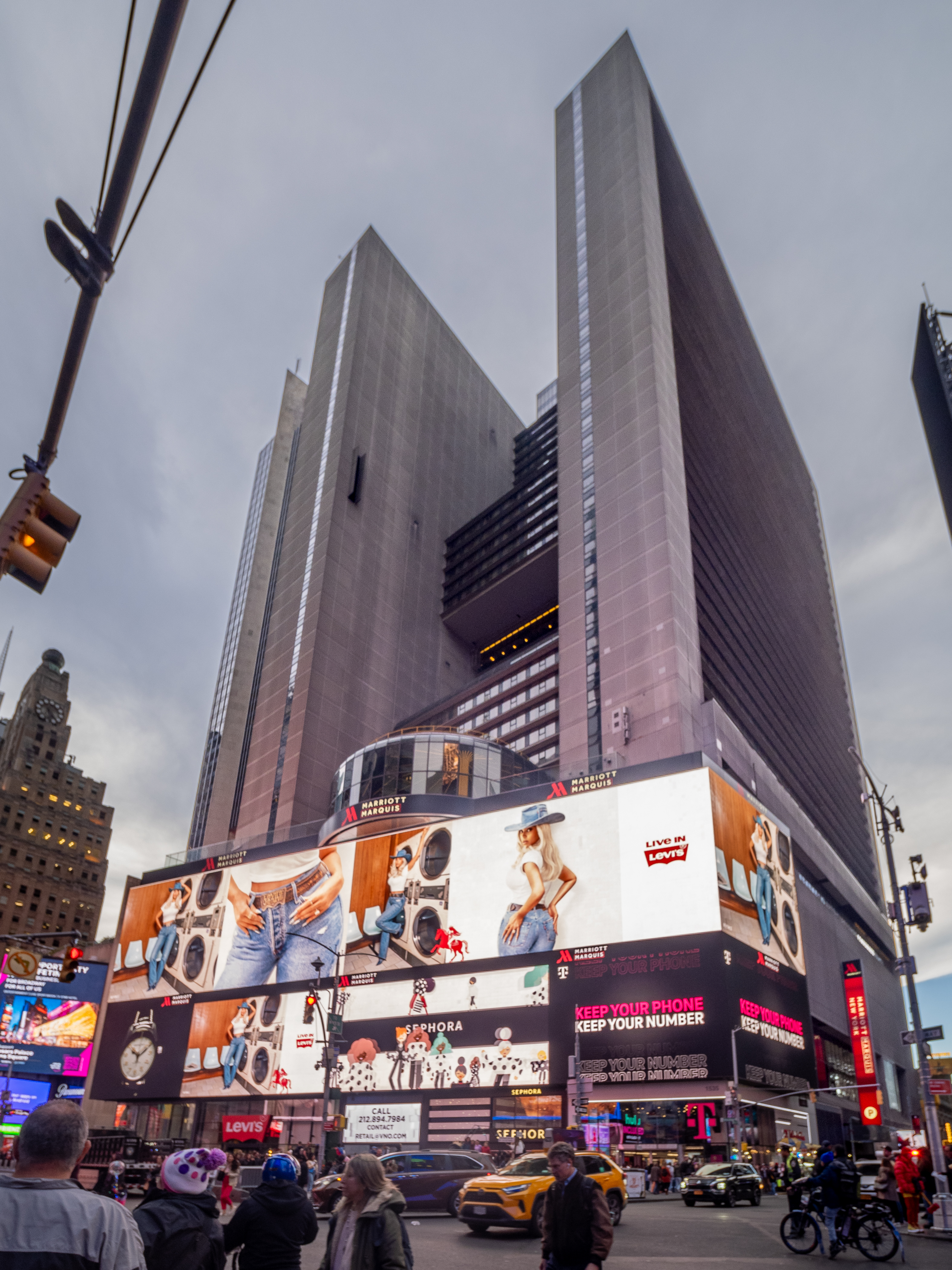
- New York Marriott Marquis (draft venue), photographed in 2024

General information
- Date: April 23–24, 1989
- Location: New York Marriott Marquis in New York City, New York
- Network: ESPN

Overview
- 335 total selections in 12 rounds
- League: National Football League
- First selection: Troy Aikman, QB; Dallas Cowboys
- Mr. Irrelevant: Everett Ross, WR; Minnesota Vikings
- Most selections (20): Chicago Bears
- Fewest selections (4): Philadelphia Eagles
- Hall of Famers: 5: QB Troy Aikman; RB Barry Sanders; LB Derrick Thomas; CB Deion Sanders; S Steve Atwater

The 1989 NFL draft (also known as the NFL Annual Player Selection Meeting) was the procedure by which National Football League teams selected amateur college football players. The draft was held April 23–24, 1989, at the Marriott Marquis in New York City, New York. The league also held a supplemental draft after the regular draft and before the regular season.

Four of the first five players selected in the draft—quarterback Troy Aikman, running back Barry Sanders, linebacker Derrick Thomas, and cornerback Deion Sanders—would be inducted to the Pro Football Hall of Fame. Tackle Tony Mandarich, the only top five pick not inducted, is considered a draft bust.

The 1989 NFL draft also helped set a major precedent, as Barry Sanders was selected with the third overall pick despite an NFL rule stating that collegiate juniors could not declare for the draft. Since Barry Sanders was selected as a junior, it has become an expectation for top college players to declare for the draft after their junior season; the rule disallowing collegiate juniors in the NFL draft was lifted by the next draft. Sanders, the 1988 Heisman Trophy winner, was allowed to declare early when Oklahoma State was found guilty of numerous major NCAA rule violations and placed on five years' probation in January 1989.

Another precedent the draft helped set was how players were invited to the actual draft room. First overall selection Aikman was represented by Leigh Steinberg, who went with his client to the draft finding he was the only player there. As years followed, more players began getting invited to the draft.

== Player selections ==
*	Compensatory selection
†	Pro Bowler
‡	Hall of Famer

Positions key
Offense	Defense	Special teams
QB — Quarterback; RB — Running back; FB — Fullback; WR — Wide receiver; TE — Tight end; OL — Offensive lineman; T — Tackle; G — Guard; C — Center	DL — Defensive lineman; DT — Defensive tackle (Note: Includes nose tackle (NT)); DE — Defensive end; EDGE — Edge rusher; LB — Linebacker (Note: Includes middle linebacker (MLB/MIKE), weakside linebacker (WILL), strongside linebacker (SAM), off-ball linebacker, and outside linebacker (OLB)); DB — Defensive back; CB — Cornerback; S — Safety (Note: Includes free safety (FS) and strong safety (SS))	K — Kicker (Note: Also known as a placekicker (PK)); P — Punter; LS — Long snapper; RS — Return specialist (Note: Includes kickoff and punt returners)

Rnd.	Pick	Team	Player	Pos.	College	Notes
1	1	Dallas Cowboys	Troy Aikman^{‡}^{†}	QB	UCLA	
1	2	Green Bay Packers	Tony Mandarich	T	Michigan State	
1	3	Detroit Lions	Barry Sanders^{‡}^{†}	RB	Oklahoma State	1988 Heisman Trophy winner
1	4	Kansas City Chiefs	Derrick Thomas^{‡}^{†}	LB	Alabama	
1	5	Atlanta Falcons	Deion Sanders^{‡}^{†}	CB	Florida State	
1	6	Tampa Bay Buccaneers	Broderick Thomas	LB	Nebraska	
1	7	Pittsburgh Steelers	Tim Worley	RB	Georgia	
1	8	San Diego Chargers	Burt Grossman	DE	Pittsburgh	
1	9	Miami Dolphins	Sammie Smith	RB	Florida State	
1	10	Phoenix Cardinals	Eric Hill	LB	LSU	
1	11	Chicago Bears	Donnell Woolford ^{†}	CB	Clemson	from LA Raiders (Note: No. 11: LA Raiders → Chicago (PD). The LA Raiders traded a first-round selection (11th overall) and a 1990 third-round selection to Chicago in exchange for WR Willie Gault.)
1	12	Chicago Bears	Trace Armstrong ^{†}	DE	Florida	from Washington (Note: No. 12: Washington → Chicago (PD). Washington sent a first-round selection (12th overall) and a 1988 first-round selection to Chicago as compensation for signing free agent LB Wilber Marshall.)
1	13	Cleveland Browns	Eric Metcalf ^{†}	WR	Texas	from Denver (Note: No. 13: Denver → Cleveland (D). Denver traded a first-round selection (13th overall) to Cleveland in exchange for first-, second-, fifth- and tenth-round selections (20th, 47th, 134th and 241st overall).)
1	14	New York Jets	Jeff Lageman	DE	Virginia	
1	15	Seattle Seahawks	Andy Heck	T	Notre Dame	from Indianapolis (Note: No. 15: Indianapolis → Seattle (PD). Indianapolis traded a first-round selection (15th overall) and a 1990 first-round selection to Seattle in exchange for LB Fredd Young.)
1	16	New England Patriots	Hart Lee Dykes	WR	Oklahoma State	
1	17	Phoenix Cardinals	Joe Wolf	G	Boston College	from Seattle (Note: No. 17: Seattle → Phoenix (PD). Seattle traded first- and fifth-round selections (17th and 128th overall) and a 1988 fifth-round selection to Phoenix in exchange for QB Kelly Stouffer.)
1	18	New York Giants	Brian Williams	C	Minnesota	
1	19	New Orleans Saints	Wayne Martin ^{†}	DE	Arkansas	
1	20	Denver Broncos	Steve Atwater^{‡}^{†}	S	Arkansas	from Cleveland (Note: No. 20: Cleveland → Denver (D). See Round 1: Denver → Cleveland.)
1	21	Los Angeles Rams	Bill Hawkins	DE	Miami (FL)	
1	22	Indianapolis Colts	Andre Rison ^{†}	WR	Michigan State	from Philadelphia (Note: No. 22: Philadelphia → Indianapolis (PD). Philadelphia traded a first-round selection (22nd overall) and a 1990 fourth-round selection to Indianapolis in exchange for G Ron Solt.)
1	23	Houston Oilers	David Williams	T	Florida	
1	24	Pittsburgh Steelers	Tom Ricketts	T	Pittsburgh	from Minnesota (Note: No. 24: Minnesota → Pittsburgh (PD). Minnesota traded a first-round selection (24th overall) to Pittsburgh in exchange for LB Mike Merriweather.)
1	25	Miami Dolphins	Louis Oliver	S	Florida	from Chicago (Note: No. 25: Chicago → Miami (D). Chicago traded a first-round selection (25th overall) to Miami in exchange for second- and third-round selections (36th and 65th overall).)
1	26	Los Angeles Rams	Cleveland Gary	RB	Miami (FL)	from Buffalo via Indianapolis (Note: No. 26: Buffalo → Indianapolis → LA Rams. Multiple trades: Buffalo → Indianapolis (PD). Buffalo traded first- and second-round selections (26th and 53rd overall), a 1988 first-round selection and RB Greg Bell to Indianapolis in exchange for LB Cornelius Bennett. Indianapolis → LA Rams (PD). Indianapolis traded a first-round selection and two second-round selections (26th, 45th and 53rd overall), two 1988 first-round selections and a 1988 second-round selection, RB Greg Bell and RB Owen Gill to the LA Rams in exchange for RB Eric Dickerson.)
1	27	Atlanta Falcons	Shawn Collins	WR	Northern Arizona	from Cincinnati (Note: No. 27: Cincinnati → Atlanta (D). Cincinnati traded a first-round selection (27th overall) to Atlanta in exchange for second- and fourth-round selections (35th and 89th overall).)
1	28	San Francisco 49ers	Keith DeLong	LB	Tennessee	
2	29	Dallas Cowboys	Steve Wisniewski ^{†}	G	Penn State	
2	30	Detroit Lions	John Ford	WR	Virginia	
2	31	Cleveland Browns	Lawyer Tillman	WR	Auburn	from Green Bay (Note: No. 31: Green Bay → Cleveland (D). Green Bay traded second- and fifth-round selections (31st and 114th overall) to Cleveland in exchange for third- and fifth-round selections (74th and 127th overall), a 1990 first-round selection and RB Herman Fontenot.)
2	32	Kansas City Chiefs	Mike Elkins	QB	Wake Forest	
2	33	Tampa Bay Buccaneers	Danny Peebles	WR	NC State	
2	34	Pittsburgh Steelers	Carnell Lake ^{†}	S	UCLA	
2	35	Cincinnati Bengals	Eric Ball	RB	UCLA	from Atlanta (Note: No. 35: Atlanta → Cincinnati (D). See Round 1: Cincinnati → Atlanta.)
2	36	Chicago Bears	John Roper	LB	Texas A&M	from Miami (Note: No. 36: Miami → Chicago (D). See Round 1: Chicago → Miami.)
2	37	San Diego Chargers	Courtney Hall	C	Rice	
2	38	Atlanta Falcons	Ralph Norwood	T	LSU	from Washington (Note: No. 38: Washington → Atlanta (D). Washington traded a second-round selection (38th overall) and a 1990 first-round selection to Atlanta in exchange for a 1990 fifth-round selection and RB Gerald Riggs.)
2	39	Dallas Cowboys	Daryl Johnston ^{†}	FB	Syracuse	from LA Raiders (Note: No. 39: LA Raiders → Dallas (D). The LA Raiders traded second-, third- and fifth-round selections (39th, 68th and 119th overall) to Dallas in exchange for a sixth-round selection (140th overall) and the rights to G Steve Wisniewski (drafted by Dallas in the second round).)
2	40	Phoenix Cardinals	Walter Reeves	TE	Auburn	
2	41	Denver Broncos	Doug Widell	G	Boston College	
2	42	New York Jets	Dennis Byrd	DE	Tulsa	
2	43	New England Patriots	Eric Coleman	CB	Wyoming	
2	44	Seattle Seahawks	Joe Tofflemire	C	Arizona	
2	45	Los Angeles Rams	Frank Stams	LB	Notre Dame	from Indianapolis (Note: No. 45: Indianapolis → LA Rams (PD). See Round 1: Indianapolis → LA Rams.)
2	46	New Orleans Saints	Robert Massey ^{†}	CB	North Carolina Central	
2	47	Denver Broncos	Warren Powers	DE	Maryland	from Cleveland (Note: No. 47: Cleveland → Denver (D). See Round 1: Denver → Cleveland.)
2	48	Los Angeles Rams	Brian Smith	LB	Auburn	
2	49	Philadelphia Eagles	Jessie Small	LB	Eastern Kentucky	
2	50	Houston Oilers	Scott Kozak	LB	Oregon	
2	51	San Diego Chargers	Billy Joe Tolliver	QB	Texas Tech	from NY Giants (Note: No. 51: NY Giants → San Diego (D). The NY Giants traded a second-round selection (51st overall) to San Diego in exchange for third-, fourth- and seventh-round selections (64th, 93rd and 175th overall).)
2	52	Minnesota Vikings	David Braxton	LB	Wake Forest	
2	53	Los Angeles Rams	Darryl Henley	CB	UCLA	from Buffalo (Note: No. 53: Buffalo → Indianapolis → LA Rams. Multiple trades: Buffalo → Indianapolis (PD). See Round 1: Buffalo → Indianapolis. Indianapolis → LA Rams (PD). See Round 1: Indianapolis → LA Rams.)
2	54	Chicago Bears	Dave Zawatson	G	California	
2	55	Cincinnati Bengals	Fred Childress	G	Arkansas	
2	56	San Francisco 49ers	Wesley Walls ^{†}	TE	Ole Miss	
3	57	Dallas Cowboys	Mark Stepnoski ^{†}	C	Pittsburgh	
3	58	Green Bay Packers	Matt Brock	DE	Oregon	
3	59	Detroit Lions	Mike Utley	G	Washington State	
3	60	Kansas City Chiefs	Naz Worthen	WR	NC State	
3	61	Pittsburgh Steelers	Derek Hill	WR	Arizona	
3	62	Atlanta Falcons	Keith Jones	RB	Illinois	
3	63	New England Patriots	Marv Cook ^{†}	TE	Iowa	from Tampa Bay (Note: No. 63: Tampa Bay → New England (PD). Tampa Bay traded a third-round selection (63rd overall) to New England in exchange for WR Stephen Starring.)
3	64	New York Giants	Bob Kratch	G	Iowa	from San Diego (Note: No. 64: San Diego → NY Giants (D). See Round 2: NY Giants → San Diego.)
3	65	Chicago Bears	Jerry Fontenot	G	Texas A&M	from Miami (Note: No. 65: Miami → Chicago (D). See Round 1: Chicago → Miami.)
3	66	Washington Redskins	Tracy Rocker	DT	Auburn	
3	67	Phoenix Cardinals	Mike Zandofsky	G	Washington	
3	68	Dallas Cowboys	Rhondy Weston	DE	Florida	from LA Raiders via San Diego and LA Raiders (Note: No. 68: LA Raiders → San Diego → LA Raiders → Dallas. Multiple trades: LA Raiders → San Diego (PD). The LA Raiders traded third- and fourth-round selections (68th and 95th overall) and OT John Clay to San Diego in exchange for OT Jim Lachey. San Diego → LA Raiders (PD). San Diego traded third- and fourth-round selections (68th and 95th overall), and a 1990 fourth-round selection to the Raiders in exchange for RB Napoleon McCallum. LA Raiders → Dallas (PD). See Round 2: LA Raiders → Dallas.)
3	69	Denver Broncos	Darrell Hamilton	T	North Carolina	
3	70	New York Jets	Joe Mott	LB	Iowa	
3	71	Seattle Seahawks	Elroy Harris	RB	Eastern Kentucky	
3	72	Indianapolis Colts	Mitchell Benson	DT	TCU	
3	73	New England Patriots	Chris Gannon	DE	Southwestern Louisiana	
3	74	Green Bay Packers	Anthony Dilweg	QB	Duke	from Cleveland (Note: No. 74: Cleveland → Green Bay (D). See Round 2: Green Bay → Cleveland.)
3	75	Los Angeles Rams	Kevin Robbins	T	Michigan State	
3	76	Philadelphia Eagles	Robert Drummond	RB	Syracuse	
3	77	Houston Oilers	Bubba McDowell	S	Miami (FL)	
3	78	New York Giants	Greg Jackson	S	LSU	
3	79	New Orleans Saints	Kim Phillips	CB	North Texas	
3	80	Minnesota Vikings	John Hunter	T	BYU	
3	81	Philadelphia Eagles	Britt Hager	LB	Texas	from Chicago (Note: No. 81: Chicago → Philadelphia (D). Chicago traded a third-round selection (81st overall) to Philadelphia in exchange for fifth-, seventh-, eighth-, ninth-, tenth-, eleventh- and twelfth-round selections (130th, 189th, 216th, 243rd, 270th, 297th and 330rd).)
3	82	Buffalo Bills	Don Beebe	WR	Chadron State	
3	83	Cincinnati Bengals	Erik Wilhelm	QB	Oregon State	
3	84	San Francisco 49ers	Keith Henderson	RB	Georgia	
4	85	Dallas Cowboys	Tony Tolbert ^{†}	DE	UTEP	
4	86	Detroit Lions	Ray Crockett	CB	Baylor	
4	87	Green Bay Packers	Jeff Graham	QB	Long Beach State	
4	88	Kansas City Chiefs	Stan Petry	DB	TCU	
4	89	Cincinnati Bengals	Kerry Owens	LB	Arkansas	from Atlanta (Note: No. 89: Atlanta → Cincinnati (D). See Round 1: Cincinnati → Atlanta.)
4	90	Tampa Bay Buccaneers	Anthony Florence	DB	Bethune–Cookman	
4	91	Pittsburgh Steelers	Jerrol Williams	LB	Purdue	
4	92	Miami Dolphins	David Holmes	DB	Syracuse	
4	93	New York Giants	Lewis Tillman	RB	Jackson State	from San Diego (Note: No. 93: San Diego → NY Giants (D). See Round 2: NY Giants → San Diego.)
4	94	Phoenix Cardinals	Jim Wahler	DT	UCLA	
4	95	Chicago Bears	Markus Paul	DB	Syracuse	from LA Raiders via San Diego and LA Raiders (Note: No. 95: LA Raiders → San Diego → LA Raiders → Chicago. Multiple trades: LA Raiders → San Diego (PD). See Round 3: LA Raiders → San Diego. San Diego → LA Raiders (PD). See Round 3: San Diego → LA Raiders. LA Raiders → Chicago (D). The LA Raiders traded a fourth-round selection (95th overall) to Chicago in exchange for fourth- and sixth-round selections (110th and 165th overall).)
4	96	New England Patriots	Maurice Hurst	CB	Southern	from Washington (Note: No. 96: Washington → New England (D). Washington traded a fourth-round selection (96th overall) to New England in exchange for a 1988 fifth-round selection.)
4	97	Denver Broncos	Jake McCullough	DE	Clemson	
4	98	New York Jets	Ron Stallworth	DE	Auburn	
4	99	Indianapolis Colts	Pat Tomberlin	G	Florida State	
4	100	New England Patriots	Michael Timpson	WR	Penn State	
4	101	Seattle Seahawks	Travis McNeal	TE	Chattanooga	
4	102	Los Angeles Rams	Jeff Carlson	QB	Weber State	
4	103	Seattle Seahawks	James Henry	DB	Southern Miss	from Philadelphia (Note: No. 103: Philadelphia → Seattle (PD). Philadelphia traded a fourth-round selection (103rd overall) to Seattle in exchange for OT Ron Heller.)
4	104	Houston Oilers	Rod Harris	WR	Texas A&M	
4	105	New York Giants	Brad Henke	DT	Arizona	
4	106	New Orleans Saints	Michael Mayes	DB	LSU	
4	107	Cleveland Browns	Andrew Stewart	DE	Cincinnati	
4	108	Minnesota Vikings	Darryl Ingram	TE	California	
4	109	Buffalo Bills	John Kolesar	WR	Michigan	
4	110	Washington Redskins	Erik Affholter	WR	USC	from Chicago via LA Raiders (Note: No. 110: Chicago → LA Raiders → Washington. Multiple trades: Chicago → LA Raiders (D). See Round 4: LA Raiders → Chicago. LA Raiders → Washington (D). The Raiders traded fourth- and fifth-round selections (110th and 139th overall), and OT Jim Lachey to Washington in exchange for QB Jay Schroeder.)
4	111	Cincinnati Bengals	Rob Woods	T	Arizona	
4	112	San Francisco 49ers	Mike Barber	WR	Marshall	
5	113	Dallas Cowboys	Keith Jennings	TE	Clemson	
5	114	Cleveland Browns	Kyle Kramer	DB	Bowling Green State	from Green Bay (Note: No. 114: Green Bay → Cleveland (D). See Round 2: Green Bay → Cleveland.)
5	115	Detroit Lions	Lawrence Pete	DT	Nebraska	
5	116	Cleveland Browns	Vernon Joines	WR	Maryland	from Kansas City (Note: No. 116: Kansas City → Cleveland (PD). Kansas City traded a fifth-round selection (116th overall) to Cleveland in exchange for LB Mike Junkin.)
5	117	Tampa Bay Buccaneers	Jamie Lawson	RB	Nicholls State	
5	118	Pittsburgh Steelers	David Arnold	DB	Michigan	
5	119	Dallas Cowboys	Willis Crockett	LB	Georgia Tech	from Atlanta via LA Raiders (Note: No. 119: Atlanta → LA Raiders → Dallas. Multiple trades: Atlanta → LA Raiders (PD). Atlanta traded a fifth-round selection (119th overall) to the LA Raiders in exchange for WR Jessie Hester. LA Raiders → Dallas (D). See Round 2: LA Raiders → Dallas.)
5	120	San Diego Chargers	Elliot Smith	DB	Alcorn State	
5	121	Miami Dolphins	Jeff Uhlenhake	C	Ohio State	
5	122	San Francisco 49ers	Johnnie Jackson	CB	Houston	from LA Raiders (Note: No. 122: LA Raiders → San Francisco (D). The LA Raiders traded a fifth-round selection (122nd overall) to San Francisco in exchange for fifth- and eighth-round selections (139th and 223rd overall).)
5	123	San Francisco 49ers	Richard Tardits	LB	Georgia	
5	124	Green Bay Packers	Jeff Query	WR	Millikin	from Washington (Note: No. 124: Washington → Green Bay (D). Washington traded fifth- and eighth-round selections (124th and 206th overall) and the rights to WR Erik Affholter (drafted by Washington in the fourth round) to Green Bay in exchange for the rights to QB Jeff Graham (drafted by Green Bay in the fourth round).)
5	125	Dallas Cowboys	Jeff Roth	DT	Florida	from Denver (Note: No. 125: Denver → Dallas (PD). Denver traded a fifth-round selection (125th overall) to Dallas in exchange for RB Tony Dorsett.)
5	126	New York Jets	Tony Martin ^{†}	WR	Mesa State	
5	127	Green Bay Packers	Vince Workman	WR	Ohio State	from New England via Cleveland (Note: No. 127: New England → Cleveland → Green Bay. Multiple trades: New England → Cleveland (PD). New England traded a fifth-round selection (127th overall) to Cleveland in exchange for C Mike Baab. Cleveland → Green Bay (D). See Round 2: Green Bay → Cleveland.)
5	128	Phoenix Cardinals	David Edeen	DE	Wyoming	from Seattle (Note: No. 128: Seattle → Phoenix (PD). See Round 1: Seattle → Phoenix.)
5	129	Washington Redskins	Tim Smiley	DB	Arkansas State	from Indianapolis (Note: No. 129: Indianapolis → Washington (D). Indianapolis traded a fifth-round selection (129th overall) to Washington in exchange for 1990 fourth- and eighth-round selections.)
5	130	Chicago Bears	Mark Green	RB	Notre Dame	from Philadelphia (Note: No. 130: Philadelphia → Chicago (D). See Round 3: Chicago → Philadelphia.)
5	131	Houston Oilers	Glenn Montgomery	DT	Houston	
5	132	New York Giants	Dave Meggett ^{†}	RB	Towson	
5	133	New Orleans Saints	Kevin Haverdink	T	Western Michigan	
5	134	Denver Broncos	Darren Carrington	S	Northern Arizona	from Cleveland (Note: No. 134: Cleveland → Denver (D). See Round 1: Denver → Cleveland.)
5	135	Los Angeles Rams	Alfred Jackson	WR	San Diego State	
5	–	Minnesota Vikings	Selection forfeited during the 1988 supplemental draft. (Note: Minnesota forfeited a fifth-round selection after selecting WR Ryan Bethea in the 1988 supplemental draft.)			
5	136	Chicago Bears	Greg Gilbert	LB	Alabama	
5	137	Buffalo Bills	Michael Andrews	DB	Alcorn State	
5	138	Cincinnati Bengals	Natu Tuatagaloa	DT	California	
5	139	Washington Redskins	Lybrant Robinson	DE	Delaware State	from San Francisco via LA Raiders (Note: No. 139: San Francisco → LA Raiders → Washington. Multiple trades: San Francisco → LA Raiders (D). See Round 5: LA Raiders → San Francisco. LA Raiders → Washington (D). See Round 4: LA Raiders → Washington.)
6	140	Los Angeles Raiders	Jeff Francis	QB	Tennessee	from Dallas (Note: No. 140: Dallas → LA Raiders (D). See Round 2: LA Raiders → Dallas.)
6	141	Detroit Lions	Rodney Peete	QB	USC	
6	142	Green Bay Packers	Chris Jacke ^{†}	K	UTEP	
6	143	Kansas City Chiefs	Robb Thomas	WR	Oregon State	
6	144	Pittsburgh Steelers	Mark Stock	WR	VMI	
6	145	Atlanta Falcons	Troy Sadowski	TE	Georgia	
6	146	Tampa Bay Buccaneers	Chris Mohr	P	Alabama	
6	147	Miami Dolphins	Wes Pritchett	LB	Notre Dame	
6	148	Los Angeles Rams	Thom Kaumeyer	DB	Oregon	from San Diego (Note: No. 148: San Diego → LA Rams (PD). San Diego traded a sixth-round selection (148th overall), a 1988 second-round selection and RB Buford McGee to the LA Rams in exchange for RB Barry Redden.)
6	149	Washington Redskins	A. J. Johnson	CB	Southwest Texas State	
6	150	Phoenix Cardinals	Jay Taylor	DB	San Jose State	
6	151	New York Jets	Marvin Washington	DE	Idaho	from LA Raiders (Note: No. 151: LA Raiders → NY Jets (PD). The LA Raiders traded a sixth-round selection (151st overall) to the NY Jets in exchange for CB Russell Carter.)
6	152	Denver Broncos	Anthony Stafford	WR	Oklahoma	
6	153	New York Jets	Titus Dixon	WR	Troy State	
6	154	Tampa Bay Buccaneers	Derrick Little	LB	South Carolina	from Seattle (Note: No. 154: Seattle → Tampa Bay (PD). Seattle traded a sixth-round selection (154th overall) and DL Randy Edwards to Tampa Bay in exchange for OT Ron Heller.)
6	155	Indianapolis Colts	Quintus McDonald	LB	Penn State	
6	156	Los Angeles Raiders	Doug Lloyd	RB	North Dakota State	from New England (Note: No. 156: New England → LA Raiders (D). New England traded a sixth-round selection (156th overall) to the LA Raiders in exchange for sixth- and eighth-round selections (165th and 223rd overall).)
6	157	Houston Oilers	Bo Orlando	DB	West Virginia	
6	158	New York Giants	Howard Cross	TE	Alabama	
6	159	New Orleans Saints	Floyd Turner	WR	Northwestern State	
6	160	Cleveland Browns	Gary Wilkerson	DB	Penn State	
6	161	Los Angeles Rams	Mark Messner	LB	Michigan	
6	162	Philadelphia Eagles	Heath Sherman	RB	Texas A&M–Kingsville	
6	163	Minnesota Vikings	Jeff Mickel	T	Eastern Washington	
6	164	Buffalo Bills	Sean Doctor	TE	Marshall	
6	165	New England Patriots	Eric Mitchell	RB	Oklahoma	from Chicago via LA Raiders (Note: No. 165: Chicago → LA Raiders → New England. Multiple trades: Chicago → LA Raiders (D). See Round 4: LA Raiders → Chicago. LA Raiders → New England (D). See Round 6: New England → LA Raiders.)
6	166	Cincinnati Bengals	Craig Taylor	RB	West Virginia	
6	167	San Francisco 49ers	Steve Hendrickson	LB	California	
7	168	Dallas Cowboys	Kevin Peterson	LB	Northwestern	
7	169	Green Bay Packers	Mark Hall	DE	Southwestern Louisiana	
7	170	Detroit Lions	Jerry Woods	DE	Northern Michigan	
7	171	Kansas City Chiefs	Ron Sancho	LB	LSU	
7	172	Atlanta Falcons	Undra Johnson	RB	West Virginia	
7	173	Buffalo Bills	Brian Jordan	DB	Richmond	from Tampa Bay (Note: No. 173: Tampa Bay → Buffalo (PD). Tampa Bay traded a seventh-round selection (173rd overall) to Buffalo in exchange for LB Eugene Marve.)
7	174	Pittsburgh Steelers	D. J. Johnson	DB	Kentucky	
7	175	New York Giants	Dave Popp	T	Eastern Illinois	from San Diego (Note: No. 175: San Diego → NY Giants (D). See Round 2: NY Giants → San Diego.)
7	176	Miami Dolphins	Jim Zdelar	T	Youngstown State	
7	177	Phoenix Cardinals	Rickey Royal	DB	Sam Houston	
7	178	New England Patriots	Eric Lindstrom	LB	Boston College	from LA Raiders (Note: No. 178: LA Raiders → New England (PD). The LA Raiders traded a seventh-round selection (178th overall) and a 1988 tenth-round selection to New England in exchange for OT Brian Holloway.)
7	179	Washington Redskins	Kevin Hendrix	LB	South Carolina	
7	180	Denver Broncos	Melvin Bratton	RB	Miami (FL)	
7	181	New York Jets	Stevon Moore	RB	Ole Miss	
7	182	Indianapolis Colts	Ivy Joe Hunter	RB	Kentucky	
7	183	San Diego Chargers	Marion Butts ^{†}	RB	Florida State	from New England (Note: No. 183: New England → San Diego (PD). New England traded a seventh-round selection (183th overall) to San Diego in exchange for LB Thomas Benson.)
7	184	Seattle Seahawks	Mike Nettles	DB	Memphis State	
7	185	Indianapolis Colts	Charles Washington	DB	Cameron	from NY Giants (Note: No. 185: NY Giants → Indianapolis (PD). The NY Giants traded a seventh-round selection (185th overall) to Indianapolis in exchange for TE Tim Sherwin.)
7	186	New Orleans Saints	David Griggs	LB	Virginia	
7	187	Cleveland Browns	Mike Graybill	T	Boston University	
7	188	Los Angeles Rams	George Bethune	LB	Alabama	
7	189	Chicago Bears	Richard Brothers	DB	Arkansas	from Philadelphia (Note: No. 189: Philadelphia → Chicago (D). See Round 3: Chicago → Philadelphia.)
7	190	Houston Oilers	Tracy Rogers	LB	Fresno State	
7	191	Minnesota Vikings	Benji Roland	DT	Auburn	
7	192	Chicago Bears	Brent Snyder	QB	Utah State	
7	193	Buffalo Bills	Chris Hale	DB	USC	
7	194	Cincinnati Bengals	Kendal Smith	WR	Utah State	
7	195	San Diego Chargers	Terrence Jones	QB	Tulane	from San Francisco (Note: No. 195: San Francisco → San Diego (PD). San Francisco traded a seventh-round selection (195th overall), a 1990 seventh-round selection and C Fred Quillan to San Diego in exchange for WR Wes Chandler.)
8	196	Dallas Cowboys	Charvez Foger	RB	Nevada	
8	197	Detroit Lions	Chris Parker	DT	West Virginia	
8	198	Green Bay Packers	Thomas King	DB	Southwestern Louisiana	
8	199	Kansas City Chiefs	Bryan Tobey	RB	Grambling State	
8	200	Tampa Bay Buccaneers	Carl Bax	G	Missouri	
8	201	Pittsburgh Steelers	Chris Asbeck	DT	Cincinnati	
8	202	Atlanta Falcons	Paul Singer	QB	Western Illinois	
8	203	Miami Dolphins	Pete Stoyanovich	K	Indiana	
8	204	San Diego Chargers	Dana Brinson	WR	Nebraska	
8	205	Los Angeles Raiders	Derrick Gainer	RB	Florida A&M	
8	206	Green Bay Packers	Brian Shulman	P	Auburn	from Washington (Note: No. 206: Washington → Green Bay (D). See Round 5: Washington → Green Bay.)
8	207	Phoenix Cardinals	John Burch	RB	UT Martin	
8	208	Denver Broncos	Paul Green	TE	USC	
8	209	New York Jets	A. B. Brown	RB	West Virginia	
8	210	New England Patriots	Rodney Rice	DB	BYU	
8	211	Seattle Seahawks	Marlin Williams	DE	Western Illinois	
8	212	Indianapolis Colts	Kurt Larson	LB	Michigan State	
8	213	New Orleans Saints	Fred Hadley	WR	Mississippi State	
8	214	Cleveland Browns	Rick Aeilts	TE	Southeast Missouri State	
8	215	Los Angeles Rams	Warren Wheat	T	BYU	
8	216	Chicago Bears	Tony Woods	DT	Oklahoma	from Philadelphia (Note: No. 216: Philadelphia → Chicago (PD). See Round 3: Chicago → Philadelphia.)
8	217	Houston Oilers	Alvoid Mays	DB	West Virginia	
8	218	New York Giants	Myron Guyton	DB	Eastern Kentucky	
8	219	Minnesota Vikings	Alex Stewart	DE	Cal State Fullerton	
8	220	Kansas City Chiefs	Todd McNair	RB	Temple	from Buffalo (Note: No. 220: Buffalo → Kansas City (PD). Buffalo traded an eighth-round selection (220th overall) and a 1990 fifth-round selection to Kansas City in exchange for a 1990 eighth-round selection and DE Art Still.)
8	221	Chicago Bears	Chris Dyko	T	Washington State	
8	222	Cincinnati Bengals	Chris Chenault	LB	Kentucky	
8	223	New England Patriots	Tony Zackery	DB	Washington	from San Francisco via LA Raiders (Note: No. 223: San Francisco → LA Raiders → New England. Multiple trades: San Francisco → LA Raiders (D). See Round 5: LA Raiders → San Francisco. LA Raiders → New England (D). See Round 6: New England → LA Raiders.)
9	224	Dallas Cowboys	Tim Jackson	DB	Nebraska	
9	225	Green Bay Packers	Scott Kirby	T	Arizona State	
9	226	Detroit Lions	Derek MacCready	DE	Ohio State	
9	227	Kansas City Chiefs	Jack Phillips	DB	Alcorn State	
9	228	Pittsburgh Steelers	A. J. Jenkins	DE	Cal State Fullerton	
9	229	Atlanta Falcons	Chris Dunn	LB	Cal Poly	
9	230	Tampa Bay Buccaneers	Patrick Egu	RB	Nevada	
9	231	San Diego Chargers	Pat Davis	TE	Syracuse	
9	232	Miami Dolphins	Dana Batiste	LB	Texas A&M	
9	233	Washington Redskins	Charles Darrington	TE	Kentucky	
9	234	Phoenix Cardinals	Kendall Trainor	K	Arkansas	
9	235	Los Angeles Raiders	Gary Gooden	DB	Indiana	
9	236	Denver Broncos	Monte Smith	G	North Dakota State	
9	237	New York Jets	Pat Marlatt	DT	West Virginia	
9	238	Seattle Seahawks	David Franks	G	Connecticut	
9	239	Indianapolis Colts	William Mackall	WR	UT Martin	
9	240	New England Patriots	Darron Norris	RB	Texas	
9	241	Denver Broncos	Wayne Williams	RB	Florida	from Cleveland (Note: No. 241: Cleveland → Denver (D). See Round 1: Denver → Cleveland.)
9	242	Los Angeles Rams	Vernon Kirk	TE	Pittsburgh	
9	243	Chicago Bears	LaSalle Harper	LB	Arkansas	from Philadelphia (Note: No. 243: Philadelphia → Chicago (PD). See Round 3: Chicago → Philadelphia.)
9	244	Houston Oilers	Bob Mrosko	TE	Penn State	
9	245	New York Giants	A.J. Greene	DB	Wake Forest	
9	246	New Orleans Saints	Jerry Leggett	LB	Cal State Fullerton	
9	247	New England Patriots	Curtis Wilson	C	Missouri	from Minnesota (Note: No. 247: Minnesota → New England (PD). Minnesota traded a ninth-round selection (247th overall) to New England in exchange for a 1988 eleventh-round selection.)
9	248	Chicago Bears	Byron Sanders	RB	Northwestern	
9	249	Buffalo Bills	Pat Rabold	DT	Wyoming	
9	250	Cincinnati Bengals	Richard Stephens	T	Tulsa	
9	251	San Francisco 49ers	Rudy Harmon	LB	LSU	
10	252	Dallas Cowboys	Rod Carter	LB	Miami (FL)	
10	253	Detroit Lions	Jason Phillips	WR	Houston	
10	254	Green Bay Packers	Ben Jessie	DB	Southwest Texas State	
10	255	Kansas City Chiefs	Rob McGovern	LB	Holy Cross	
10	256	Cincinnati Bengals	Cornell Holloway	DB	Pittsburgh	from Atlanta (Note: No. 256: Atlanta → Cincinnati (D). See Round 1: Cincinnati → Atlanta.)
10	257	Tampa Bay Buccaneers	Ty Granger	T	Clemson	
10	258	Pittsburgh Steelers	Jerry Olsavsky	LB	Pittsburgh	
10	259	Miami Dolphins	Deval Glover	WR	Syracuse	
10	260	San Diego Chargers	Ricky Andrews	LB	Washington	
10	261	Phoenix Cardinals	Chris Becker	P	TCU	
10	262	Los Angeles Raiders	Charles Jackson	DT	Jackson State	
10	263	Washington Redskins	Mark Schlereth ^{†}	G	Idaho	
10	264	Denver Broncos	Anthony Butts	DT	Mississippi State	
10	265	New York Jets	Adam Bob	LB	Texas A&M	
10	266	Indianapolis Colts	Jim Thompson	T	Auburn	
10	267	New England Patriots	Emanuel McNeil	DT	UT Martin	
10	268	Seattle Seahawks	Derrick Fenner	RB	North Carolina	
10	269	Los Angeles Rams	Mike Williams	WR	Northeastern	
10	270	Chicago Bears	Todd Millikan	TE	Nebraska	from Philadelphia (Note: No. 270: Philadelphia → Chicago (PD). See Round 3: Chicago → Philadelphia.)
10	271	Houston Oilers	Tracy Johnson	RB	Clemson	
10	272	New York Giants	Rodney Lowe	DE	Ole Miss	
10	273	New Orleans Saints	Joe Henderson	RB	Iowa State	
10	274	Cleveland Browns	John Buddenberg	T	Akron	
10	275	Miami Dolphins	Greg Ross	DT	Memphis State	from Minnesota (Note: No. 275: Minnesota → Miami (PD). Minnesota traded a tenth-round selection (275th overall) and a 1988 sixth-round selection to Miami in exchange for OL Greg Koch.)
10	276	Buffalo Bills	Carlo Cheattom	DB	Auburn	
10	277	Chicago Bears	John Simpson	WR	Baylor	
10	278	Cincinnati Bengals	Bob Jean	QB	New Hampshire	
10	279	San Francisco 49ers	Andy Sinclair	C	Stanford	
11	280	Dallas Cowboys	Randy Shannon	LB	Miami (FL)	
11	281	Green Bay Packers	Cedric Stallworth	DB	Georgia Tech	
11	282	Detroit Lions	Keith Karpinski	LB	Penn State	
11	283	Kansas City Chiefs	Marcus Turner	DB	UCLA	
11	284	Tampa Bay Buccaneers	Rod Mounts	G	Texas A&M	
11	285	Pittsburgh Steelers	Brian Slater	WR	Washington	
11	286	Atlanta Falcons	Greg Paterra	RB	Slippery Rock	
11	287	San Diego Chargers	Victor Floyd	RB	Florida State	
11	288	Miami Dolphins	Bert Weidner	DT	Kent State	
11	289	San Francisco 49ers	Jim Bell	RB	Boston College	from LA Raiders (Note: No. 289: LA Raiders → San Francisco (D). The LA Raiders traded an eleventh-round selection (289th overall) to San Francisco in exchange for a twelfth-round selection (335th overall) and a 1990 twelfth-round selection.)
11	290	Tampa Bay Buccaneers	Willie Griffin	DE	Nebraska	from Washington via LA Rams (Note: No. 290: Washington → LA Rams → Tampa Bay. Multiple trades: Washington → LA Rams (PD). Washington traded an eleventh-round selection (290th overall) and a 1988 twelfth-round selection to the LA Rams in exchange for a 1988 twelfth-round selection. LA Rams → Tampa Bay (??). The LA Rams traded two eleventh-round selections and a twelfth-round selection (290th, 302nd and 329th overall) to Tampa Bay in exchange for a 1990 eighth-round selection.)
11	291	Phoenix Cardinals	Jeffrey Hunter	DE	Albany State	
11	292	Denver Broncos	Richard Shelton	DB	Liberty	
11	293	New York Jets	Artie Holmes	DB	Washington State	
11	294	New England Patriots	Tony Hinz	RB	Harvard	
11	295	Seattle Seahawks	Mike Baum	DE	Northwestern	
11	296	Indianapolis Colts	Wayne Johnson	QB	Georgia	
11	297	Chicago Bears	Joe Nelms	DT	Cal Poly	from Philadelphia (Note: No. 297: Philadelphia → Chicago (PD). See Round 3: Chicago → Philadelphia.)
11	298	Houston Oilers	Brian Smider	T	West Virginia	
11	299	New York Giants	Jerome Rinehart	LB	UT Martin	
11	300	New Orleans Saints	Calvin Nicholson	DB	Oregon State	
11	301	Cleveland Browns	Dan Plocki	K	Maryland	
11	302	Tampa Bay Buccaneers	Herb Duncan	WR	Northern Arizona	from LA Rams (Note: No. 302: LA Rams → Tampa Bay (??). See Round 11: LA Rams → Tampa Bay.)
11	303	Minnesota Vikings	Brad Baxter	RB	Alabama State	
11	304	Chicago Bears	George Streeter	DB	Notre Dame	
11	305	Buffalo Bills	Richard Harvey	LB	Tulane	
11	306	Cincinnati Bengals	Dana Wells	DT	Arizona	
11	307	San Francisco 49ers	Norm McGee	WR	North Dakota	
12	308	Dallas Cowboys	Scott Ankrom	WR	TCU	
12	309	Detroit Lions	James Cribbs	DE	Memphis State	
12	310	Green Bay Packers	Stan Shiver	DB	Florida State	
12	311	Kansas City Chiefs	Bill Jones	RB	Southwest Texas State	
12	312	Pittsburgh Steelers	Carlton Haselrig ^{†}	G	Pitt-Johnstown	
12	313	Atlanta Falcons	Tony Bowick	DT	Chattanooga	
12	314	Indianapolis Colts	William DuBose	RB	South Carolina State	from Tampa Bay (Note: No. 314: Tampa Bay → Indianapolis (PD). Tampa Bay traded a twelfth-round selection (314th overall) to Indianapolis in exchange for QB Joe Ferguson.)
12	315	Miami Dolphins	J. B. Brown	DB	Maryland	
12	316	Washington Redskins	Jimmie Johnson	TE	Howard	from San Diego (Note: No. 316: San Diego → Washington (D). San Diego traded a twelfth-round selection (316th overall) to Washington in exchange for a 1990 twelfth-round selection.)
12	317	Washington Redskins	Joe Mickles	RB	Ole Miss	
12	318	Phoenix Cardinals	Todd Nelson	G	Wisconsin	
12	319	San Francisco 49ers	Antonio Goss	LB	North Carolina	from LA Raiders (Note: No. 319: LA Raiders → San Francisco (PD). The LA Raiders traded a twelfth-round selection (319th overall) to San Francisco in exchange for LB Milt McColl.)
12	320	Denver Broncos	John Javis	WR	Howard	
12	321	New York Jets	Willie Snead III	WR	Florida	
12	322	Seattle Seahawks	R.J. Kors	DB	Long Beach State	
12	323	Indianapolis Colts	Steve Taylor	QB	Nebraska	
12	324	New England Patriots	Aaron Chubb	LB	TCU	
12	325	Houston Oilers	Chuck Hartlieb	QB	Iowa	
12	326	New York Giants	Eric Smith	DE	Miami (FL)	
12	327	New Orleans Saints	Mike Cadore	WR	Eastern Kentucky	
12	328	Cleveland Browns	Marlon Brown	LB	Memphis State	
12	329	Tampa Bay Buccaneers	Terry Young	DB	Georgia Southern	from LA Rams (Note: No. 329: LA Rams → Tampa Bay (??). See Round 11: LA Rams → Tampa Bay.)
12	330	Chicago Bears	Freddy Weygand	WR	Auburn	from Philadelphia (Note: No. 330: Philadelphia → Chicago (PD). See Round 3: Chicago → Philadelphia.)
12	331	Minnesota Vikings	Shawn Woodson	LB	James Madison	
12	332	Buffalo Bills	Derrell Marshall	T	USC	
12	333	Chicago Bears	Anthony Phillips	G	Oklahoma	
12	334	Cincinnati Bengals	Scott Jones	T	Washington	
12	335	Minnesota Vikings	Everett Ross	WR	Ohio State	from San Francisco via LA Raiders (Note: No. 335: San Francisco → LA Raiders → Minnesota. Multiple trades: San Francisco → LA Raiders (D). See Round 11: LA Raiders → San Francisco. LA Raiders → Minnesota (D). The LA Raiders traded a twelfth-round selection (335th overall) to Minnesota in exchange for a 1990 eleventh-round selection.)

== Supplemental draft ==
The supplemental draft was held on Friday, July 7.

Rnd.	Pick	Team	Player	Pos.	College	Notes
1	—	Dallas Cowboys	Steve Walsh	QB	Miami (FL)	
1	—	Phoenix Cardinals	Timm Rosenbach	QB	Washington State	
1	—	Denver Broncos	Bobby Humphrey ^{†}	RB	Alabama	
8	—	Buffalo Bills	Brett Young	DB	Oregon	
12	—	Dallas Cowboys	Mike Lowman	RB	Coffeyville J.C.	

== Notable undrafted players ==
†	Pro Bowler (Note: Players are identified as a Pro Bowler if they were selected for the Pro Bowl at any time in their career.)

Original NFL team	Player	Pos.	College	Notes
Buffalo Bills	Louie Aguiar	P	Utah State	
Buffalo Bills	Charlie Baumann	K	West Virginia	
Buffalo Bills	Matt Jaworski	LB	Colgate	
Chicago Bears	James Coley	TE	Clemson	
Chicago Bears	Steve Hyche	LB	West Alabama	
Chicago Bears	Garrett Limbrick	RB	Oklahoma State	
Chicago Bears	Tom Waddle	WR	Boston College	
Cincinnati Bengals	Ken Moyer	G	Toledo	
Cincinnati Bengals	Todd Philcox	QB	Syracuse	
Dallas Cowboys	Scott Adams	T	Georgia	
Dallas Cowboys	John Duff	TE	New Mexico	
Dallas Cowboys	Darryl Ford	LB	New Mexico State	
Dallas Cowboys	Kenny Tippins	LB	Middle Tennessee	
Detroit Lions	Bruce Alexander	CB	Stephen F. Austin	
Detroit Lions	James Dixon	WR	Houston	
Detroit Lions	John Miller	S	Michigan State	
Houston Oilers	Steve Avery	FB	Northern Michigan	
Houston Oilers	Erik Norgard	C	Colorado	
Indianapolis Colts	Ben Jefferson	G	Maryland	
Indianapolis Colts	Anthony Parker	CB	Arizona State	
Los Angeles Raiders	Keith English	P	Colorado	
Miami Dolphins	Andre Brown	WR	Miami	
New England Patriots	Glenn Antrum	WR	UConn	
New England Patriots	Terrence Cooks	LB	Nicholls State	
New England Patriots	Peter Shorts	DT	Illinois State	
New Orleans Saints	Paul Frazier	RB	Northwestern State	
New Orleans Saints	Jason Garrett	QB	Princeton	
New York Giants	Frank Miotke	WR	Grand Valley State	
New York Giants	Björn Nittmo	K	Appalachian State	
New York Jets	Greg Werner	TE	DePauw	
Philadelphia Eagles	Anthony Edwards	WR	New Mexico Highlands	
Philadelphia Eagles	Steve Gabbard	T	Florida State	
Phoenix Cardinals	Tim Jorden	TE	Indiana	
Phoenix Cardinals	Kevin Lewis	DB	Northwestern State	
Pittsburgh Steelers	Terry O'Shea	TE	California (PA)	
Pittsburgh Steelers	Tracy Simien	LB	TCU	
San Diego Chargers	Michael Brooks	DB	NC State	
San Diego Chargers	Wayne Walker	WR	Texas Tech	
Seattle Seahawks	Willie Bouyer	WR	Michigan State	
Seattle Seahawks	Rod Stephens	LB	Georgia Tech	
Tampa Bay Buccaneers	John Harvey	RB	UTEP	
Tampa Bay Buccaneers	Alvin Mitchell	RB	Auburn	
Washington Redskins	Carl Harry	WR	Utah	

== Hall of Famers ==
- Barry Sanders, running back from Oklahoma State, taken third overall by Detroit Lions.

Inducted: Professional Football Hall of Fame class of 2004

- Troy Aikman, quarterback from UCLA, taken first overall by Dallas Cowboys.

Inducted: Professional Football Hall of Fame class of 2006

- Derrick Thomas, linebacker from Alabama, taken fourth overall by Kansas City Chiefs.

Inducted: Professional Football Hall of Fame class of 2009 (posthumous)

- Deion Sanders, cornerback from Florida State, taken fifth overall by Atlanta Falcons.

Inducted: Professional Football Hall of Fame class of 2011

- Steve Atwater, safety from Arkansas, taken twentieth overall by Denver Broncos.

Inducted: Professional Football Hall of Fame class of 2020

== Trades ==
In the explanations below, (D) denotes trades that took place during the 1989 draft, while (PD) indicates trades completed pre-draft.

Round 1

Round 2

Round 3

Round 4

Round 5

Round 6

Round 7

Round 8

Round 9

Round 10

Round 11

Round 12

== Forfeited picks ==
One selection in the 1989 draft was forfeited:
