= 1988 Sun Bowl =

American college football game

1988 John Hancock Sun Bowl
- 55th Sun Bowl
Army Cadets	Alabama Crimson Tide
(9–2)	(8–3)
Independent	SEC
28	29
Head coach: Jim Young	Head coach: Bill Curry
	AP / Coaches; 20 / 20
	1	2	3	4	Total
Army	7	7	14	0	28
Alabama	3	10	7	9	29
- Date: December 24, 1988
- Season: 1988
- Stadium: Sun Bowl
- Location: El Paso, Texas
- MVP: David Smith, Alabama QB; Derrick Thomas, Alabama LB
- Referee: J.C. Louderback (Big Eight)
- Attendance: 48,719

United States TV coverage
- Network: CBS (blacked out locally)
- Announcers: Verne Lundquist and Pat Haden

The 1988 John Hancock Sun Bowl, part of the 1988 bowl game season, took place on December 24, 1988, at the Sun Bowl in El Paso, Texas. The competing teams were the Alabama Crimson Tide, representing the Southeastern Conference (SEC), and the Army Cadets, competing as a football independent. The game put Alabama's air attack against Army's ground attack, and ended with Alabama just edging past Army in the fourth quarter to win the game 29–28.

== Teams ==
=== Alabama ===
The 1988 Alabama squad finished the regular season with an 8–3 record and losses against Ole Miss, LSU and Auburn. The appearance marked the third for Alabama in the Sun Bowl, and their 41st overall bowl game appearance. David Smith, hindered by a knee injury early in the season, was presumed to start the game. Prior to the game, Curry sent backup Jeff Dunn home due to violating team rules and elevated Vince Sutton to backup.

=== Army ===
The 1988 Army squad finished the regular season with a record of 9–2 with losses coming against Washington and Boston College. The appearance in the Sun Bowl marked the first for Army in the game, and their third overall bowl game appearance.

== Game summary ==
The Cadets opened the scoring with a one-yard Mike Mayweather touchdown run to take a 7–0 lead. The Crimson Tide responded with a 37-yard Philip Doyle field goal to cut the lead to 7–3 at the end of the first. In the second quarter, Army again scored on the run with Bryan McWilliams reaching the endzone on a 30-yard run. Alabama again responded with a 22-yard Philip Doyle field goal and a 7-yard Marco Battle touchdown reception from David Smith to close the gap to 14–13 at the half. Army went into halftime with a 14–13 lead by putting up 232 yards on the ground.

Alabama put together a 69-yard drive to take its first lead 20–14 in the game half way through the third quarter on a 23-yard Greg Payne touchdown reception. Army answered with another touchdown on the next drive to take the lead back at 21-20. On Alabama's next drive David Smith was intercepted by Army's O'Neal Miller who returned it 57 yards for a touchdown and a 28-20 lead. In the fourth quarter Alabama put together two scoring drives for a 32-yard Doyle field goal and a 2-yard David Casteal run to regain the lead at 29–28.

Army put up 350 yards on the ground against Alabama's 5th-ranked defense that gave up less than 100 yards per game on average during the season. Army Coach Jim Young said about the game "Alabama was one of the better teams in the country. We played them and beat them in everything except the score." The El Paso Times ranks this game 11th among the top Sun Bowl games ever.

Scoring summary

Quarter	Time	Drive			Team	Scoring information	Score	
Quarter	Time	Plays	Yards	TOP	Team	Scoring information	Army	Alabama
1	12:04	7	70	2:56	Army	Mike Mayweather 1-yard touchdown run, Keith Walker kick good	7	0
1	1:25	14	65	4:30	Alabama	37-yard field goal by Philip Doyle	7	3
2	14:02	6	69	2:23	Army	Bryan McWilliams 30-yard touchdown run, Keith Walker kick good	14	3
2	7:33	11	67	6:29	Alabama	22-yard field goal by Philip Doyle	14	6
2	0:35	8	76		Alabama	Marco Battle 7-yard touchdown reception from David Smith, Philip Doyle kick good	14	13
3	4:23	8	69	2:50	Alabama	Greg Payne 23-yard touchdown reception from David Smith, Philip Doyle kick good	14	20
3	1:22	6	69	2:50	Army	Mike Mayweather 3-yard touchdown run, Keith Walker kick good	21	20
3	0:07	1	57		Army	Interception returned 57 yards for touchdown by O'Neal Miller, Keith Walker kick good	28	20
4	7:25	12	49	4:12	Alabama	22-yard field goal by Philip Doyle	28	23
4	4:01	5	54	2:16	Alabama	David Casteal 2-yard touchdown run, 2-point run failed	28	29
"TOP" = time of possession. For other American football terms, see Glossary of American football.							28	29

== Legacy ==
Alabama quarterback David Smith later became a college football referee in the SEC; games he officiated include the 2013 Senior Bowl and 2018 Sun Bowl.
