= Earthquake Game =

Notable college football game

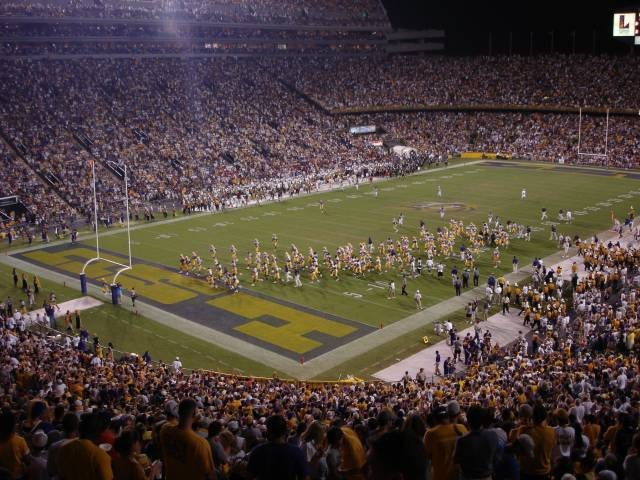
- Tiger Stadium, venue
Auburn Tigers	LSU Tigers
(4–0)	(2–2)
6	7
Head coach: Pat Dye	Head coach: Mike Archer
AP / Coaches; 4 / 4
	1	2	3	4	Total
Auburn	0	3	0	3	6
LSU	0	0	0	7	7
- Date: October 8, 1988
- Season: 1988
- Stadium: Tiger Stadium
- Location: Baton Rouge, Louisiana

United States TV coverage
- Network: ESPN
- Announcers: Mike Patrick and Kevin Kiley

The Earthquake Game was a college football game in which the crowd reaction after an important play registered on a demonstration seismograph. Played in front of a crowd of 79,431 at Louisiana State University's Tiger Stadium on October 8, 1988, the LSU Tigers upset No. 4 Auburn 7–6.

== Background ==
The game pitted Southeastern Conference rivals Auburn and LSU and was one of the more notable games in the Auburn–LSU football rivalry. Along with national rankings, the game also proved to be of great significance to that season's eventual SEC title. The stadium was filled to capacity and the game was being broadcast on ESPN.

== The game ==
The game was dominated by defense. LSU managed only one drive of over 10 yards in the first half. The only score of the first half was a field goal by Auburn's Win Lyle with 1:41 to go before halftime. LSU made it to the Auburn 23-yard line midway through the third quarter, but a clipping penalty moved the team out of field goal range. On Auburn's next possession, Lyle kicked another field goal with 10:18 left in the game to make the score 6–0.

=== The play ===
Auburn led 6–0 with less than two minutes left in the 4th quarter. LSU's quarterback Tommy Hodson drove the team down the field before throwing an 11-yard touchdown pass to Eddie Fuller on 4th down.

The game's name resulted from the reaction of the crowd after the final pass, which registered as ground motion by a demonstration seismograph "installed on the floor" of the LSU’s Howe-Russell Geoscience Complex around 1,000 feet (305 m) from the stadium. This seismograph was there for the hands-on education of visitors and school groups. Someone could jump on the floor and see it record an "earthquake." The seismograph reading was discovered the morning after the game by LSU seismologist Don Stevenson and student worker Riley Milner. Word of the seismograph reading reached The Daily Reveille and spread to the local media. Stevenson submitted the reading to the Louisiana Geological Survey to have it preserved. Stevenson displayed a copy of the reading on his office window on the LSU campus that was later observed by an ESPN news crew, which was on campus doing a story sometime prior to when Stevenson left LSU in the summer of 1991. The news crew decided to do a piece on what they dubbed "The Earthquake Game." This news story helped to add more attention to the event.

== Aftermath and legacy ==
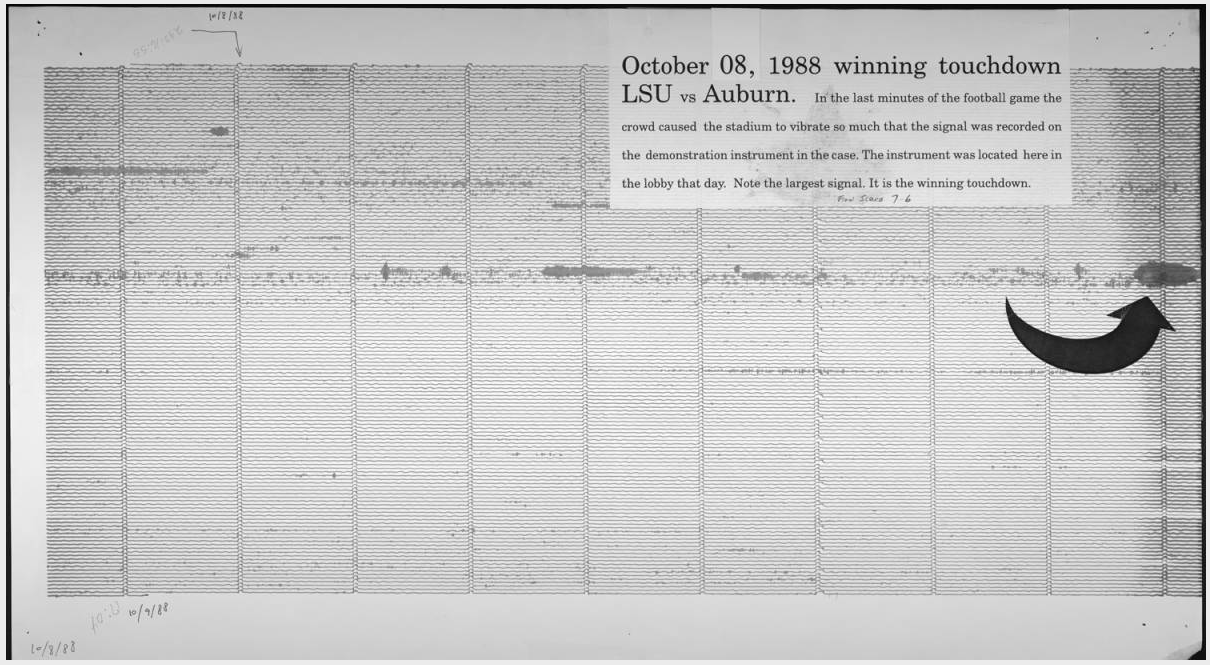
Richter scale from the demonstration seismograph located on LSU's Campus during "The Earthquake Game" in 1988

The win brought LSU's win–loss record to 3–2 on the season and a No. 19 ranking in the AP Poll. The team finished the regular season with an 8–3 record and lost to Syracuse in the Hall of Fame Bowl. Auburn dropped to 4–1 and to No. 12 in the poll. The game was the only one Auburn lost in the regular season. The team was defeated by Florida State in the Sugar Bowl.

In games played by LSU at Tiger Stadium, the winning touchdown is included in a montage that is shown at the start of the 4th quarter.

== See also ==
Similar seismic activity has been registered during other football games:

- 2011 NFL playoff game between the Seattle Seahawks and the New Orleans Saints
- 2013 Iron Bowl between Auburn and Alabama
- Seven times at Virginia Tech's Lane Stadium: first in 2011 against Miami, in 2015 against Ohio State, Miami in 2016, Clemson in 2017, Notre Dame in 2018, Miami, also in 2018, and North Carolina in 2021.
- Three times at LSU since then: "Garthquake" happened on April 30, 2022; Garth Brooks played Callin' Baton Rouge, and the noise generated shook the venue again. Then, on November 5, 2022, LSU fans generated two such events back to back - first when Jayden Daniels scored a touchdown on a 25 yard run in overtime, then another three minutes later when Mason Taylor caught the game-winning two-point conversion.
