= Mike Archer (gridiron football) =

American gridiron football player and coach (born 1953)

Personal information
- Born: July 26, 1953 (age 73); State College, Pennsylvania, U.S.

Career information
- College: Miami (FL)

Career history
- Miami (FL) (1976–1977) Graduate assistant; Miami (FL) (1978) Assistant coach; Miami (FL) (1979–1983) Defensive backs coach; LSU (1984) Defensive backs coach; LSU (1985–1986) Defensive coordinator & defensive backs coach; LSU (1987–1990) Head coach; Virginia (1991–1992) Linebackers coach; Kentucky (1993–1994) Defensive coordinator & linebackers coach; Kentucky (1995) Assistant head coach/Defensive coordinator & linebackers coach; Pittsburgh Steelers (1996–2002) Linebackers coach; Kentucky (2003–2006) Defensive coordinator; NC State (2007–2012) Defensive coordinator; Virginia (2014) Safeties coach; Virginia (2015) Associate head coach & linebackers coach; Toronto Argonauts (2017) Linebackers coach; Toronto Argonauts (2018) Defensive coordinator; Tampa Bay Vipers (2020) Linebackers coach

Awards and highlights
- Grey Cup champion (2017)

Head coaching record
- Regular season: 27–18–1 (.598)
- Postseason: 1–1 (.500)
- Career: 28–19–1 (.594)

Mike Archer (born July 26, 1953) is an American football coach and former player. From 1987 to 1990, Archer was the head football coach at Louisiana State University, where he compiled a record of 27–18–1. Archer has also served as an assistant coach at his alma mater University of Miami, the University of Virginia, and the University of Kentucky, the Pittsburgh Steelers of the National Football League (NFL), and with the Toronto Argonauts of the Canadian Football League (CFL).

== Coaching career ==
Archer came to Louisiana State University as an assistant coach in 1984 after being both a player and an assistant coach at the University of Miami. He replaced Bill Arnsparger as the LSU Tigers football head coach in 1987 when Arnsparger left to become the athletic director at the University of Florida. Archer was Arnsparger's defensive coordinator in 1985 and 1986, and was Arnsparger's hand-picked successor. When Archer took the LSU head coaching job, he was 34 years old, the youngest head coach in Division I-A football. Archer was chosen over a number of interviewed candidates, which reportedly included Steve Spurrier, Mike Shanahan, and Mack Brown. Arnsparger later hired Spurrier at head football coach at Florida.

In 1987, LSU finished the season ranked No. 5 in both major polls with a 10–1–1 record, blemished only by a tie against Ohio State and a loss to Alabama. The latter was all that kept the Tigers out of the 1988 Sugar Bowl; Auburn went instead. It was LSU's first 10-win season in more than 25 years. Archer's Tigers followed up with an 8–4 record and a share of the Southeastern Conference title in 1988. The 1988 season was famous for the "Earthquake Game," a 7–6 victory over Auburn. While LSU and Auburn shared the conference title as a result, Auburn got the SEC's berth in the Sugar Bowl due to a higher poll ranking, and LSU lost in the Hall of Fame Bowl.

After back-to-back losing seasons in 1989 and 1990, Archer was forced to resign. He lost four of his last five games in 1990, the lone win coming in the season finale against Tulane. Archer was replaced by Curley Hallman, previously the head coach at the University of Southern Mississippi.

After leaving LSU, Archer remained in coaching, but strictly as a defensive assistant. In 1991, he became linebackers coach at Virginia. In 1993, he moved on to coach linebackers at Kentucky and was named assistant head coach there in 1995. Archer jumped to the NFL in 1996, where he served as linebackers coach for the Pittsburgh Steelers for seven years. He returned to Kentucky as defensive coordinator in 2003. Archer resigned from his position at Kentucky on January 10, 2007, to accept the same job at NC State, where he was reunited with Tom O'Brien. Archer and O'Brien worked together at Virginia from 1991 to 1992. In 2014, Archer rejoined the staff at Virginia, where O'Brien was the associate head coach.

In May 2017, he became linebacker coach with the Toronto Argonauts of the CFL. He was promoted to defensive coordinator for the 2018 season.

In 2019, Archer joined former Argonauts head coach Marc Trestman at the Tampa Bay Vipers of the XFL.

== Head coaching record ==
Year	Team	Overall	Conference	Standing	Bowl/playoffs	Coaches^{#}	AP^{°}
LSU Tigers (Southeastern Conference) (1987–1990)
1987	LSU	10–1–1	5–1	2nd	W Gator	5	5
1988	LSU	8–4	6–1	T–1st	L Hall of Fame		19
1989	LSU	4–7	2–5	T–7th			
1990	LSU	5–6	2–5	T–7th			
LSU:		27–18–1	15–12				
Total:		27–18–1					
National championship Conference title Conference division title or championship game berth
^{#}Rankings from final Coaches Poll.; ^{°}Rankings from final AP Poll.
