= Eric Ramsay =

Eric Ramsay may refer to:

- Eric Ramsay (golfer), Scottish golfer
- Eric Ramsay (football manager), football manager, coach and former player
- Eric Ramsay (politician), Australian politician

== See also ==
- Eric Ramsey, defensive back for Auburn University's football team and whistleblower
