= David Williams (offensive lineman) =

American football player (born 1966)

No. 73
- Position: Offensive tackle

Personal information
- Born: June 21, 1966 (age 60); Mulberry, Florida, U.S.
- Listed height: 6 ft 5 in (1.96 m)
- Listed weight: 294 lb (133 kg)

Career information
- High school: Lakeland (FL)
- College: Florida
- NFL draft: 1989: 1st round, 23rd overall pick

Career history
- Houston Oilers (1989–1995); New York Jets (1996–1997)

Awards and highlights
- Second-team All-American (1988); First-team All-SEC (1988); Second-team All-SEC (1987); University of Florida Athletic Hall of Fame

Career NFL statistics
- Games played: 128
- Games started: 106
- Fumble recoveries: 5
- Stats at Pro Football Reference

David Wayne Williams (born June 21, 1966) is an American former professional football player who was an offensive tackle in the National Football League (NFL) for nine seasons during the 1980s and 1990s. Williams played college football for the University of Florida. He was a first-round pick in the 1989 NFL draft, and played professionally for the Houston Oilers and the New York Jets of the NFL.

== Early life ==
Williams was born in Mulberry, Florida in 1966. He attended Lakeland High School in Lakeland, Florida, where he was an offensive lineman for the Lakeland Dreadnaughts high school football team. While he played for the Dreadnaughts, the team won a district championship in 1983, and regional championships in 1982 and 1984. He and was named a Parade magazine and USA Today All-American after his senior season.

Williams was inducted into the Lakeland High School Sports Hall of Fame in 1993. In 2007, twenty-two years after he graduated from high school, the Florida High School Athletic Association (FHSAA) recognized Williams as one of the "100 Greatest Players of the First 100 Years" of Florida high school football.

== College career ==
After graduating from high school, Williams accepted an athletic scholarship to attend the University of Florida in Gainesville, Florida, where he played for coach Galen Hall's Florida Gators football team from 1985 to 1988. As a freshman starter, he was a member of the Gators' 1985 team that finished with an overall win–loss record of 9–1–1 and a best-in-the-conference record of 5–1. Williams started every game during his four-year college career. He was a first-team All-Southeastern Conference (SEC) selection in 1988, a second-team All-American in 1987 and 1988, and a team captain in 1988. Williams was inducted into the University of Florida Athletic Hall of Fame as a "Gator Great" in 1999. In one of a series of articles published by The Gainesville Sun in 2006, the Sun sports editors ranked him as the No. 27 all-time greatest Gator from the first century of Florida football.

== Professional career ==
Williams was selected in the first round (23rd pick overall) of the 1989 NFL draft by the Houston Oilers. He was an offensive tackle for the Oilers for seven seasons from 1989 to 1995. He played in twenty-nine of thirty-two games during his rookie and second seasons, and became a full-time starter in the first game of his third season. Williams played his final two NFL seasons for the New York Jets in 1996 and 1997. He retired from professional football after the 1997 season.

For all of his on-the-field accomplishments, Williams' NFL career is often remembered for an off-the-field episode during the 1993 season known as "babygate." During his fifth season with the Oilers, his wife Debi went into labor with their first child on the Saturday before an Oilers away game against the New England Patriots, and did not give birth until it was too late for Williams to either fly on the team's plane or get a commercial flight to catch up with the team. The Oilers fined Williams and deducted $111,111 from his pay for the missed game, and Oilers owner Bud Adams publicly criticized him for having misplaced priorities. A public firestorm ensued, with the Oilers receiving a large share of fan and media criticism, and an informal precedent was set that future teams in similar circumstances would handle such matters differently.

During his nine-season NFL career, Williams played in 128 regular season games, and started in 106 of them.

== See also ==
- Florida Gators football, 1980–89
- History of the Tennessee Titans & Houston Oilers
- List of Florida Gators in the NFL draft
- List of University of Florida Athletic Hall of Fame members
- List of New York Jets players
