= 1988 All-SEC football team =

American college football all-star team

The 1988 All-SEC football team consists of American football players selected to the All-Southeastern Conference (SEC) chosen by various selectors for the 1988 college football season.

== Offensive selections ==
=== Receivers ===
- Boo Mitchell, Vanderbilt (AP-1)
- Tony Moss, LSU (AP-1)

=== Tight ends ===
- Wesley Walls, Ole Miss (AP-1)

=== Tackles ===
- David Williams, Florida (AP-1)
- Jim Thompson, Auburn (AP-1)

=== Guards ===
- Rodney Garner, Auburn (AP-1)
- Larry Rose, Alabama (AP-1)

=== Centers ===
- Todd Wheeler, Georgia (AP-1)

=== Quarterbacks ===
- Reggie Slack, Auburn (AP-1)

=== Running backs ===
- Tim Worley, Georgia (AP-1)
- Emmitt Smith, Florida (College Football Hall of Fame) (AP-1)

== Defensive selections ==
=== Tackles ===
- Tracy Rocker, Auburn (AP-1)
- Trace Armstrong, Florida (AP-1)

=== Middle guards ===
- Benji Roland, Auburn (AP-1)

=== Linebackers ===
- Derrick Thomas, Alabama (AP-1)
- Quentin Riggins, Auburn (AP-1)
- Ron Sancho, LSU (AP-1)
- Keith DeLong, Tennessee (AP-1)
- Randy Holleran, Kentucky (AP-1)

=== Backs ===
- Louis Oliver, Florida (AP-1)
- Stevon Moore, Ole Miss (AP-1)
- Greg Jackson, LSU (AP-1)

== Special teams ==
=== Kicker ===
- David Browndyke, LSU (AP-1)

=== Punter ===
- Brian Shulman, Auburn (AP-1)

== Key ==
AP = Associated Press

UPI = United Press International

Bold = Consensus first-team selection by both AP and UPI

== See also ==
- 1988 College Football All-America Team
