= Brian Shulman =

American football player (born 1966)

No. 1
- Position: Punter

Personal information
- Born: April 20, 1966 (age 60); Anniston, Alabama, U.S.

Career information
- College: Auburn University
- NFL draft: 1989: 8th round, 206th overall pick

Career history
- Green Bay Packers (1989–1990)

Awards and highlights
- First-team All-SEC (1988)

Brian Shulman (born April 20, 1966) is an American former professional football player in the National Football League (NFL). He was selected by the Green Bay Packers in the eighth round of the 1989 NFL draft, making him the last punter from Auburn University to be drafted into the NFL.

In 2001, Shulman founded LTS Education Systems, a company that developed online game-based learning systems for children. LTS was acquired by K12 Inc. in April 2016.

Shulman is also the author of The Death of Sportsmanship and How to Revive It.

== Football career ==
In 1986 Shulman was awarded a scholarship to play football at Auburn University under Coach Pat Dye. Shulman was the starting punter from 1986 to 1988. He was a captain on Auburn's 1988 team, which won SEC Championship and was named no.1 nationally in scoring defense and total defense. He finished college as a two-time All-Southeastern Conference (SEC) player, making him the only punter in Auburn history to be selected ALL-SEC twice. Shulman was selected by the Green Bay Packers in 1989 in the eighth round.
