= Greg Jackson (American football) =

American football player and coach (born 1966)

No. 47, 42
- Position: Safety

Personal information
- Born: August 20, 1966 (age 60); Hialeah, Florida, U.S.
- Listed height: 6 ft 1 in (1.85 m)
- Listed weight: 217 lb (98 kg)

Career information
- High school: American Senior (Miami, Florida)
- College: LSU
- NFL draft: 1989: 3rd round, 78th overall pick

Career history

Playing
- New York Giants (1989–1993); Philadelphia Eagles (1994–1995); New Orleans Saints (1996); San Diego Chargers (1997–2000)

Coaching
- Idaho (2003) Defensive backs coach; Louisiana–Monroe (2004–2006) Defensive backs coach; Tulane (2007) Defensive backs coach; Tulane (2008) Safeties / kickoff coach; Tulane (2009) Linebackers / kickoff coach; Wisconsin (2010) Nickel / assistant linebackers coach; San Francisco 49ers (2011–2014) Defensive assistant; Michigan (2015) Defensive backs coach; Dallas Cowboys (2016–2019) Safeties coach; Houston Texans (2021) Safeties coach

Awards and highlights
- Super Bowl champion (XXV); First-team All-SEC (1988)

Career NFL statistics
- Tackles: 689
- Quarterback sacks: 4
- Interceptions: 32
- Forced fumbles: 8
- Stats at Pro Football Reference

Gregory Allen Jackson (born August 20, 1966) is an American football coach who is the safeties coach for the Houston Texans of the National Football League (NFL). Jackson is also a former player who played safety in the NFL for 12 seasons for the New York Giants, San Diego Chargers, Philadelphia Eagles, and New Orleans Saints. He was selected by the Giants in the third round of the 1989 NFL draft and played college football at LSU.

== Playing career ==
Pre-draft measurables
Height	Weight	40-yard dash	10-yard split	20-yard split	20-yard shuttle	Vertical jump	Broad jump	Bench press
6 ft 0 3/8 in (1.84 m)	198 lb (90 kg)	4.72 s	1.65 s	2.80 s	4.20 s	32.0 in (0.81 m)	9 ft 6 in (2.90 m)	14 reps

In 1994, he took over from Wes Hopkins as the starting free safety of the Philadelphia Eagles, and played there the following year, until he was replaced by rookie Brian Dawkins. Jackson is also known for making the tackle against Emmitt Smith that sprained his shoulder in the final regular season game of the 1993 season. Smith went on to account for 229 total yards with said shoulder injury, giving the Cowboys a much needed first round bye in the playoffs on their way to a second straight Super Bowl, Super Bowl XXVIII. This is known as one of the Dallas Cowboys' greatest games.

== Coaching career ==
Jackson was hired as assistant secondary coach by the San Francisco 49ers on February 17, 2011. After Jim Harbaugh left the 49ers to coach at the University of Michigan, he brought Jackson with him to serve as the secondary coach.

In 2016, Jackson returned to the NFL when he was hired to be the safeties coach for the Dallas Cowboys. When Jason Garrett was fired in 2020 Jackson was let go from the team. Jackson was hired by the Houston Texans as their safeties coach on March 10, 2021.
