= Anthony Stafford (Canadian football) =

American football player (born 1966)

No. 33
- Position: Running back

Personal information
- Born: November 20, 1966 (age 59); St. Louis, Missouri, U.S.
- Listed height: 5 ft 8 in (1.73 m)
- Listed weight: 180 lb (82 kg)

Career information
- High school: Sumner (St. Louis)
- College: Oklahoma (1985–1988)
- NFL draft: 1989: 6th round, 152nd overall pick

Career history
- Denver Broncos (1989)*; Ottawa Rough Riders (1989–1990)
- * Offseason or practice squad member only

Awards and highlights
- National champion (1985)

Anthony Stafford (born November 20, 1966) is an American former football running back. He played college football at Oklahoma, and was selected by the Denver Broncos in the sixth round of the 1989 NFL draft. He played professionally in the Canadian Football League.

== Early life ==
Anthony Stafford was born on November 20, 1966, in St. Louis, Missouri. He attended Sumner High School in St. Louis.

== College career ==
Stafford was a four-year letterman for the Oklahoma Sooners from 1985 to 1988. He was a member of the 1985 team that won the national championship. He finished his college career with totals of 264 carries for 1,664 yards and 19 touchdowns, four receptions for 64 yards and one touchdown, and 17 kick returns for 381 yards.

== Professional career ==
Pre-draft measurables
Height	Weight	40-yard dash	10-yard split	20-yard split	20-yard shuttle	Vertical jump	Broad jump	Bench press
5 ft 7 7/8 in (1.72 m)	183 lb (83 kg)	4.47 s	1.57 s	2.66 s	4.16 s	36.0 in (0.91 m)	10 ft 0 in (3.05 m)	12 reps
All values from NFL Combine

Stafford was selected by the Denver Broncos in the sixth round, with the 152nd overall pick, of the 1989 NFL draft. He was waived on August 29, 1989.

Stafford dressed in three games for the Ottawa Rough Riders of the Canadian Football League during the 1989 season, recording 36 rushing attempts for 73 yards, five receptions for 30 yards, one kickoff return for 31 yards, and two fumbles. He also spent some time on the practice roster in 1989. He was signed to Ottawa's practice roster again on August 18, 1990. Stafford was promoted to the active roster before the team's playoff game against the Toronto Argonauts on November 11, 1990.

== Personal life ==
In May 1991, Stafford graduated from Oklahoma with a degree in mass communications. That same year, he became the head of the Action Inc. social service agency, based in Norman, Oklahoma.
