= 1988 Vanderbilt Commodores football team =

American college football season

1988 Vanderbilt Commodores football
- Conference: Southeastern Conference
- Record: 3–8 (2–5 SEC)
- Head coach: Watson Brown (3rd season)
- Defensive coordinator: Dick Hopkins (3rd season)
- Base defense: 4–3
- Home stadium: Vanderbilt Stadium

1988 Southeastern Conference football standings
	Conf.					Overall
Team	W		L		T	W		L		T
No. 19 LSU +	6	–	1	–	0	8	–	4	–	0
No. 8 Auburn +	6	–	1	–	0	10	–	2	–	0
No. 15 Georgia	5	–	2	–	0	9	–	3	–	0
No. 17 Alabama	4	–	3	–	0	9	–	3	–	0
Florida	4	–	3	–	0	7	–	5	–	0
Tennessee	3	–	4	–	0	5	–	6	–	0
Ole Miss	3	–	4	–	0	5	–	6	–	0
Kentucky	2	–	5	–	0	5	–	6	–	0
Vanderbilt	2	–	5	–	0	3	–	8	–	0
Mississippi State	0	–	7	–	0	1	–	10	–	0
+ – Conference co-champions; Rankings from AP Poll

The 1988 Vanderbilt Commodores football team represented Vanderbilt University in the 1988 NCAA Division I-A football season as a member of the Southeastern Conference (SEC). The Commodores were led by head coach Watson Brown in his third season and finished with a record of three wins and eight losses (3–8 overall, 2–5 in the SEC).

== Schedule ==
Date	Opponent	Site	TV	Result	Attendance	Source
September 10	Mississippi State	Vanderbilt Stadium; Nashville, TN		W 24–20	41,365	
September 17	at Rutgers*	Giants Stadium; East Rutherford, NJ		W 31–30	23,477	
September 24	at No. 13 Alabama	Bryant–Denny Stadium; Tuscaloosa, AL		L 10–44	70,123	
October 1	Duke*	Vanderbilt Stadium; Nashville, TN		L 15–17	39,372	
October 8	at No. 15 Georgia	Sanford Stadium; Athens, GA (rivalry)		L 22–41	81,804	
October 15	No. 20 Florida	Vanderbilt Stadium; Nashville, TN	TBS	W 24–9	41,000	
October 22	Ole Miss	Vanderbilt Stadium; Nashville, TN (rivalry)		L 28–36	41,276	
November 5	at Kentucky	Commonwealth Stadium; Lexington, KY (rivalry)		L 13–14	44,105	
November 12	at Army*	Michie Stadium; West Point, NY		L 19–24	40,339	
November 19	at Memphis State*	Liberty Bowl Memorial Stadium; Memphis, TN		L 9–28	21,212	
November 26	Tennessee	Vanderbilt Stadium; Nashville, TN (rivalry)		L 7–14	41,404	
*Non-conference game; Rankings from AP Poll released prior to the game
