= 1988 Tennessee Volunteers football team =

American college football season

1988 Tennessee Volunteers football
- Conference: Southeastern Conference
- Record: 5–6 (3–4 SEC)
- Head coach: Johnny Majors (12th season)
- Offensive coordinator: Walt Harris (6th season)
- Defensive coordinator: Ken Donahue (4th season)
- Captains: Keith DeLong; Nate Middlebrooks
- Home stadium: Neyland Stadium

1988 Southeastern Conference football standings
	Conf.					Overall
Team	W		L		T	W		L		T
No. 19 LSU +	6	–	1	–	0	8	–	4	–	0
No. 8 Auburn +	6	–	1	–	0	10	–	2	–	0
No. 15 Georgia	5	–	2	–	0	9	–	3	–	0
No. 17 Alabama	4	–	3	–	0	9	–	3	–	0
Florida	4	–	3	–	0	7	–	5	–	0
Tennessee	3	–	4	–	0	5	–	6	–	0
Ole Miss	3	–	4	–	0	5	–	6	–	0
Kentucky	2	–	5	–	0	5	–	6	–	0
Vanderbilt	2	–	5	–	0	3	–	8	–	0
Mississippi State	0	–	7	–	0	1	–	10	–	0
+ – Conference co-champions; Rankings from AP Poll

The 1988 Tennessee Volunteers football team represented the University of Tennessee in the 1988 season. Playing as a member of the Southeastern Conference (SEC), the team was led by head coach Johnny Majors, in his 12th year, and played their home games at Neyland Stadium in Knoxville, Tennessee. They finished the season with a record of five wins and six losses (5–6 overall, 3–4 in the SEC). The Vols' offense scored 212 points while the defense allowed 286 points.

== Schedule ==
Date	Opponent	Rank	Site	TV	Result	Attendance	Source
September 3	at No. 12 Georgia	No. 18	Sanford Stadium; Athens, GA (rivalry)	ESPN	L 17–28	82,122	
September 10	Duke*		Neyland Stadium; Knoxville, TN		L 26–31	93,144	
September 17	No. 9 LSU		Neyland Stadium; Knoxville, TN	TBS	L 9–34	92,849	
September 24	at No. 4 Auburn		Jordan-Hare Stadium; Auburn, AL (rivalry)	CBS	L 6–38	83,687	
October 1	Washington State*		Neyland Stadium; Knoxville, TN		L 24–52	92,276	
October 15	No. 20 Alabama		Neyland Stadium; Knoxville, TN (Third Saturday in October)		L 20–28	93,025	
October 22	at Memphis State*		Liberty Bowl Memorial Stadium; Memphis, TN		W 38–25	55,173	
November 5	Boston College*^{†}		Neyland Stadium; Knoxville, TN		W 10–7	90,030	
November 12	at Ole Miss		Vaught–Hemingway Stadium; Oxford, MS (rivalry)		W 20–12	27,686	
November 19	Kentucky		Neyland Stadium; Knoxville, TN (rivalry)		W 28–24	90,353	
November 26	at Vanderbilt		Vanderbilt Stadium; Nashville, TN (rivalry)		W 14–7	41,404	
*Non-conference game; ^{†}Homecoming; Rankings from AP Poll released prior to the game

== Team players drafted into the NFL ==
Player	Position	Round	Pick	NFL club
Keith DeLong	Linebacker	1	28	San Francisco 49ers
Jeff Francis	Quarterback	6	140	Los Angeles Raiders
