= Benji Roland =

American football player (born 1967)

No. 93
- Position: Nose tackle

Personal information
- Born: April 4, 1967 (age 59); Eastman, Georgia, U.S.
- Listed height: 6 ft 3 in (1.91 m)
- Listed weight: 260 lb (118 kg)

Career information
- High school: Eastman (GA) Dodge County
- College: Auburn
- NFL draft: 1989: 7th round, 191st overall pick

Career history
- Minnesota Vikings (1989)*; Atlanta Falcons (1989)*; Tampa Bay Buccaneers (1990); Atlanta Falcons (1991)*
- * Offseason or practice squad member only

Awards and highlights
- First-team All-SEC (1988)
- Stats at Pro Football Reference

Benji Roland (born April 4, 1967) is an American former professional football nose tackle. He was selected by the Minnesota Vikings in the seventh round of the 1989 NFL draft with the 191st overall pick. He played for the Tampa Bay Buccaneers in 1990.
