= Rockey Felker =

American football player and coach (born 1953)

Biographical details
- Born: February 1, 1953 (age 73); Jackson, Tennessee, U.S.

Playing career
- 1972–1974: Mississippi State
- Position: Quarterback

Coaching career (HC unless noted)
- 1975–1978: Mississippi State (JV/WR/RB)
- 1979–1980: Texas Tech (assistant)
- 1981–1982: Memphis State (assistant)
- 1983–1985: Alabama (WR/DB)
- 1986–1990: Mississippi State
- 1991–1992: Tulsa (OC)
- 1993–1996: Arkansas (OC)
- 1997–1999: Tulsa (OC)
- 2002–2006: Mississippi State (football operations)
- 2007–2008: Mississippi State (RB)
- 2009–2017: Mississippi State (dir. player personnel)

Head coaching record
- Overall: 21–34

Accomplishments and honors

Awards
- SEC Player of the Year (1974); First-team All-SEC (1974)

Rockey Felker (born February 1, 1953) is an American former college football player and coach. He played quarterback at Mississippi State University from 1972 to 1974 and served as at head coach of Mississippi State Bulldogs football program from 1986 to 1990. He returned to Mississippi state in 2002, serving in a number of administrative and assistant coaching positions before retiring as director of player personnel for the Bulldogs after the 2017 season. After serving three different stints and working for four different head coaches at Mississippi State, Felker is considered one of the school's native sons.

== Playing career ==
Felker played quarterback at Mississippi State from 1972 to 1974 under coaches Charley Shira and Bob Tyler after a five-sport career at Haywood High School, Brownsville, Tennessee. Helping lead Mississippi State to a 9–3 season and a win over North Carolina in the 1974 Sun Bowl, Felker continues rank in the program's top ten in multiple passing categories including: passing yardage (#9), pass completions (#10, 207), yards per attempt (#8, 6.98), passing efficiency (#7, 112.65), and touchdown passes (#7, 23). He is also ranked nine in total offense with 3,776 yards and seventh in total touchdowns accounted for with 35 (12 rushing and 23 passing). Felker was named the SEC Player of the Year in 1974 by The Nashville Banner. Felker was drafted by the Cincinnati Bengals in the tenth round of the 1975 NFL draft.

== Coaching career ==
After serving as an assistant coach for three years at his alma mater, Felker served in several assistant coach capacities in the South, including Texas Tech University, Memphis State University, and the University of Alabama. After almost 10 years away from Starkville, Felker was called home to lead his alma mater, which was coming off four straight losing seasons. At 33, Felker was the youngest coach in the country.

Felker started the 1986 season with a bang. By late October, the Bulldogs were 6–1, and needed only one more win to secure a bowl appearance. However, they suffered four consecutive blowout losses to Auburn, Alabama, LSU and Ole Miss, during which they scored a total of nine points. This left the Bulldogs at 6–5. Still, Felker was the first Mississippi State coach in 30 years to start his career with a winning record.

However, the rough end to 1986 proved to be a harbinger for the remainder of Felker's tenure. He suffered four losing seasons (4–7, 1–10, 5–6, 5–6) between 1987 and 1990, and only won a total of five games in Southeastern Conference play. The 1988 season is the second-worst on-field record in modern Bulldogs history. He was fired at the end of the 1990 season and replaced by Jackie Sherrill.

Since leaving his position as head coach, Felker has enjoyed a successful tenure as an assistant coach. After coaching at the University of Tulsa, and the University of Arkansas, Felker returned home at the request of Sherrill and remained a staple of the Mississippi State staff under Sylvester Croom and Dan Mullen. In 2017, Felker retired.

== Head coaching record ==
Year	Team	Overall	Conference	Standing	Bowl/playoffs
Mississippi State Bulldogs (Southeastern Conference) (1986–1990)
1986	Mississippi State	6–5	2–4	T–7th	
1987	Mississippi State	4–7	1–5	T–7th	
1988	Mississippi State	1–10	0–7	10th	
1989	Mississippi State	5–6	1–6	9th	
1990	Mississippi State	5–6	1–6	T–8th	
Miss State:		21–34	5–28		
Total:		21–34			
