= 1988 Auburn Tigers football team =

American college football season

1988 Auburn Tigers football

SEC co-champion

Sugar Bowl, L 7–13 vs Florida State
- Conference: Southeastern Conference

Ranking
- Coaches: No. 7
- AP: No. 8
- Record: 10–2 (6–1 SEC)
- Head coach: Pat Dye (8th season)
- Defensive coordinator: Wayne Hall (3rd season)
- Home stadium: Jordan–Hare Stadium

1988 Southeastern Conference football standings
	Conf.					Overall
Team	W		L		T	W		L		T
No. 19 LSU +	6	–	1	–	0	8	–	4	–	0
No. 8 Auburn +	6	–	1	–	0	10	–	2	–	0
No. 15 Georgia	5	–	2	–	0	9	–	3	–	0
No. 17 Alabama	4	–	3	–	0	9	–	3	–	0
Florida	4	–	3	–	0	7	–	5	–	0
Tennessee	3	–	4	–	0	5	–	6	–	0
Ole Miss	3	–	4	–	0	5	–	6	–	0
Kentucky	2	–	5	–	0	5	–	6	–	0
Vanderbilt	2	–	5	–	0	3	–	8	–	0
Mississippi State	0	–	7	–	0	1	–	10	–	0
+ – Conference co-champions; Rankings from AP Poll

The 1988 Auburn Tigers football team represented Auburn University in the 1988 NCAA Division I-A football season. Coached by Pat Dye, the team finished the season with a 10–2 record and won its second consecutive Southeastern Conference (SEC) title, sharing it with LSU. LSU handed Auburn its only conference loss of the year 7–6, in a game referred to as the "Earthquake Game". Auburn lost to Florida State, 13–7, in the 1989 Sugar Bowl.

== Schedule ==
Date	Opponent	Rank	Site	TV	Result	Attendance	Source
September 10	Kentucky	No. 7	Jordan-Hare Stadium; Auburn, AL	TBS	W 20–10	67,000	
September 17	Kansas*	No. 6	Jordan-Hare Stadium; Auburn, AL		W 56–7	55,700	
September 24	Tennessee	No. 4	Jordan-Hare Stadium; Auburn, AL (rivalry)	CBS	W 38–6	83,687	
October 1	North Carolina*	No. 4	Jordan-Hare Stadium; Auburn, AL		W 47–21	73,611	
October 8	at LSU	No. 4	Tiger Stadium; Baton Rouge, LA (Earthquake Game, rivalry)	ESPN	L 6–7	79,431	
October 15	Akron*	No. 12	Jordan-Hare Stadium; Auburn, AL		W 42–0	61,300	
October 22	Mississippi State	No. 10	Jordan-Hare Stadium; Auburn, AL		W 33–0	67,300	
October 29	at Florida	No. 9	Florida Field; Gainesville, FL (rivalry)	ESPN	W 16–0	75,199	
November 5	Southern Miss*^{†}	No. 9	Jordan-Hare Stadium; Auburn, AL		W 38–8	73,787	
November 12	No. 17 Georgia	No. 9	Jordan-Hare Stadium; Auburn, AL (rivalry)	CBS	W 20–10	85,214	
November 25	at No. 17 Alabama	No. 7	Legion Field; Birmingham, AL (Iron Bowl)	CBS	W 15–10	75,962	
January 2	vs. No. 4 Florida State*	No. 7	Louisiana Superdome; New Orleans, LA (Sugar Bowl)	ABC	L 7–13	61,934	
*Non-conference game; ^{†}Homecoming; Rankings from AP Poll released prior to the game

== Personnel ==
1988 Auburn Tigers football team roster
Players
Coaches
Offense

Pos.	#	Name	Class
TB	10	James Joseph	So
C	70	Bob Meeks	Fr
TE	86	Walter Reeves	Sr
QB	17	Reggie Slack	Jr
WR	85	Lawyer Tillman	Sr
WR	14	Freddy Weygand	Sr

Defense

Pos.	#	Name	Class
DB	35	Carlo Cheattom	Sr
LB	56	Smokey Hodge	Sr
DB	39	Charles Kelly
CB	27	Eric Ramsey	So
DT	74	Tracy Rocker	Sr
DT	96	Benji Roland	Sr
LB	90	Brian Smith	Sr
DE	92	Ron Stallworth	Sr

Special teams

Pos.	#	Name	Class
P	1	Brian Shulman	Sr
K	3	Jim Von Wyl	Fr

Head coach

- Pat Dye

Coordinators/assistant coaches

Legend

- (C) Team captain
- (S) Suspended
- (I) Ineligible
- Injured
- Redshirt

Roster

== Rankings ==
Ranking movements Legend: ██ Increase in ranking ██ Decrease in ranking
	Week																
Poll	Pre	1	2	3	4	5	6	7	8	9	10	11	12	13	14	15	Final
AP	7	7	7	6	4	4	4	12	10	9	9	9	8	7	7	7	8
Coaches Poll	7	7	7	7	5	4	4	12	9	9	9	9	9	7	7	7	7
