= 1989 Hall of Fame Bowl =

- 3rd Hall of Fame Bowl
LSU Tigers	Syracuse Orangemen
(8–3)	(9–2)
SEC	Independent
10	23
Head coach: Mike Archer	Head coach: Dick MacPherson
AP / Coaches; 16 / 17	AP / Coaches; 17 / 16
	1	2	3	4	Total
LSU	0	7	3	0	10
Syracuse	7	3	7	6	23
- Date: January 2, 1989
- Season: 1988
- Stadium: Tampa Stadium
- Location: Tampa, Florida
- MVP: Robert Drummond (Syracuse QB)
- Referee: Buddy Ward (Southern Independent)
- Attendance: 51,112

United States TV coverage
- Network: NBC
- Announcers: Tom Hammond, Joe Namath

The 1989 Hall of Fame Bowl featured the 17th-ranked Syracuse Orangemen and the 16th-ranked LSU Tigers. It was the third edition of the Hall of Fame Bowl.

Syracuse scored first following a 2-yard Robert Drummond touchdown, and led 7–0 after one quarter. In the second quarter, Syracuse added a 38-yard field goal to take a 10–0 lead. LSU got on the scoreboard, following a 19-yard touchdown run by Calvin Windom getting to 10–7.

In the third quarter, David Browndyke kicked a 35-yard field goal to tie the game at 10. Robert Drummond scored on a 1-yard run late in the third quarter as Syracuse led 17–10. Syracuse added a 4-yard touchdown pass from Todd Philcox to Deval Glover for a 23-10 lead. Syracuse held on to win by that same margin.

The Orangemen avenged a 13-10 loss to the Tigers in the 1965 Sugar Bowl.

The loss marked the beginning of a dark period for LSU football. The Tigers recorded six consecutive losing seasons from 1989 through 1994, leading to the resignation of coach Mike Archer following the 1990 season and the dismissal of his successor, Curley Hallman, after four seasons. LSU did not return to a New Year's Day bowl game until 2001, by which time it had fired another coach, Gerry DiNardo, replacing him with Nick Saban.
