= 1988 Mississippi State Bulldogs football team =

American college football season

1988 Mississippi State Bulldogs football
- Conference: Southeastern Conference
- Record: 1–10 (0–7 SEC)
- Head coach: Rockey Felker (3rd season)
- Defensive coordinator: Dyer Carlisle (1st season)
- Home stadium: Scott Field

1988 Southeastern Conference football standings
	Conf.					Overall
Team	W		L		T	W		L		T
No. 19 LSU +	6	–	1	–	0	8	–	4	–	0
No. 8 Auburn +	6	–	1	–	0	10	–	2	–	0
No. 15 Georgia	5	–	2	–	0	9	–	3	–	0
No. 17 Alabama	4	–	3	–	0	9	–	3	–	0
Florida	4	–	3	–	0	7	–	5	–	0
Tennessee	3	–	4	–	0	5	–	6	–	0
Ole Miss	3	–	4	–	0	5	–	6	–	0
Kentucky	2	–	5	–	0	5	–	6	–	0
Vanderbilt	2	–	5	–	0	3	–	8	–	0
Mississippi State	0	–	7	–	0	1	–	10	–	0
+ – Conference co-champions; Rankings from AP Poll

The 1988 Mississippi State Bulldogs football team represented Mississippi State University as member of the Southeastern Conference (SEC) during the 1988 NCAA Division I-A football season. Led by third-year head coach Rockey Felker, the Bulldogs compiled a record of 1–10, with a mark of 0–7 in conference play, and finished tenth in the SEC. The season is now commonly referred to as "Tech and Ten" by Bulldog fans.

== Schedule ==
Date	Opponent	Site	Result	Attendance	Source
September 3	Louisiana Tech*	Scott Field; Starkville, MS	W 21–14	28,747	
September 10	at Vanderbilt	Vanderbilt Stadium; Nashville, TN	L 20–24	41,365	
September 17	No. 7 Georgia	Scott Field; Starkville, MS	L 35–42	35,364	
September 24	at No. 20 Florida	Florida Field; Gainesville, FL	L 0–17	73,138	
October 1	at Memphis State*	Liberty Bowl Memorial Stadium; Memphis, TN	L 10–31	36,601	
October 15	vs. Southern Miss*	Mississippi Veterans Memorial Stadium; Jackson, MS	L 21–38	38,542	
October 22	at No. 10 Auburn	Jordan-Hare Stadium; Auburn, AL	L 0–33	67,300	
October 29	No. 19 Alabama	Scott Field; Starkville, MS (rivalry)	L 34–53	41,088	
November 12	No. 12 LSU	Scott Field; Starkville, MS (rivalry)	L 3–20	30,019	
November 19	at Tulane*	Louisiana Superdome; New Orleans, LA	L 22–27	20,176	
November 26	vs. Ole Miss	Mississippi Veterans Memorial Stadium; Jackson, MS (Egg Bowl)	L 6–33	28,000	
*Non-conference game; Rankings from AP Poll released prior to the game
