= 1988 Kentucky Wildcats football team =

American college football season

1988 Kentucky Wildcats football
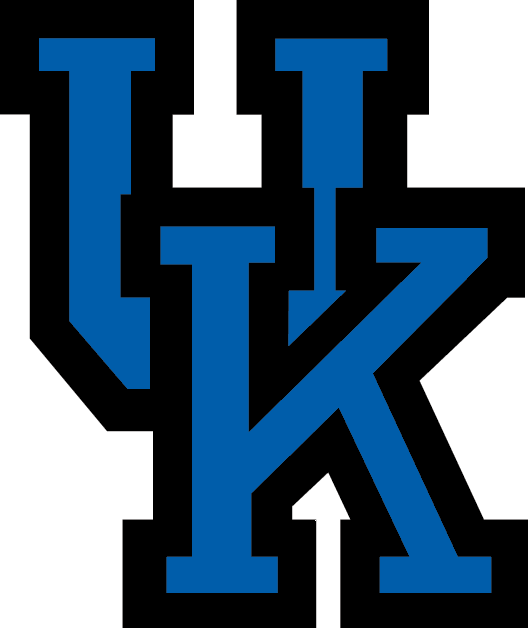
- Conference: Southeastern Conference
- Head coach: Jerry Claiborne (7th season)
- Home stadium: Commonwealth Stadium

1988 Southeastern Conference football standings
	Conf.					Overall
Team	W		L		T	W		L		T
No. 19 LSU +	6	–	1	–	0	8	–	4	–	0
No. 8 Auburn +	6	–	1	–	0	10	–	2	–	0
No. 15 Georgia	5	–	2	–	0	9	–	3	–	0
No. 17 Alabama	4	–	3	–	0	9	–	3	–	0
Florida	4	–	3	–	0	7	–	5	–	0
Tennessee	3	–	4	–	0	5	–	6	–	0
Ole Miss	3	–	4	–	0	5	–	6	–	0
Kentucky	2	–	5	–	0	5	–	6	–	0
Vanderbilt	2	–	5	–	0	3	–	8	–	0
Mississippi State	0	–	7	–	0	1	–	10	–	0
+ – Conference co-champions; Rankings from AP Poll

The 1988 Kentucky Wildcats football team represented the University of Kentucky in the 1988 NCAA Division I-A football season. The Wildcats scored 217 points while allowing 208 points. This was Jerry Claiborne's seventh season as Kentucky's head coach. The Wildcats finished 5–6, one victory shy of bowl eligibility; the highlight of the season was an upset of #11 ranked Georgia.

Kentucky opened with a win against Central Michigan, then lost at #7 Auburn and Indiana before beating Kent State. Losses to #12 Alabama and at #19 LSU followed. Next were wins against #11 Georgia, Southern Illinois and Vanderbilt, then losses to Florida and at Tennessee.

The victory over Georgia was the season's high point. Running back Alfred Rawls, a Georgia native, had 128 yards and a touchdown rushing and linebacker Randy Holleran had 13 tackles; #11 Georgia was held to 224 yards of total offense.

== Schedule ==
Date	Opponent	Site	Result	Attendance	Source
September 3	Central Michigan*	Commonwealth Stadium; Lexington, KY	W 18–7	41,736	
September 10	at No. 7 Auburn	Jordan-Hare Stadium; Auburn, AL	L 10–20	67,000	
September 17	at Indiana*	Memorial Stadium; Bloomington, IN (rivalry)	L 15–36	51,077	
September 24	Kent State*	Commonwealth Stadium; Lexington, KY	W 38–14	47,989	
October 1	No. 12 Alabama	Commonwealth Stadium; Lexington, KY	L 27–31	53,442	
October 15	at No. 19 LSU	Tiger Stadium; Baton Rouge, LA	L 12–15	71,418	
October 22	No. 11 Georgia	Commonwealth Stadium; Lexington, KY	W 16–10	50,416	
October 29	Southern Illinois*	Commonwealth Stadium; Lexington, KY	W 24–10	50,093	
November 5	Vanderbilt	Commonwealth Stadium; Lexington, KY (rivalry)	W 14–13	44,105	
November 12	Florida	Commonwealth Stadium; Lexington, KY (rivalry)	L 19–24	50,191	
November 19	at No. 11 Tennessee	Neyland Stadium; Knoxville, TN (rivalry)	L 24–28	90,353	
*Non-conference game; Rankings from AP Poll released prior to the game

== Roster ==
1988 Kentucky Wildcats football team roster
Players
Coaches
Offense

Pos.	#	Name	Class
[[American football positions|]]
[[American football positions|]]

Defense

Pos.	#	Name	Class
[[American football positions|]]

Special teams

Pos.	#	Name	Class

}}

Head coach

- [[]]

Coordinators/assistant coaches

Legend

- (C) Team captain
- (S) Suspended
- (I) Ineligible
- Injured
- Redshirt

== Team players in the 1989 NFL draft ==
Player	Position	Round	Pick	NFL club
David "D. J." Johnson	Defensive back	7	174	Pittsburgh Steelers
Ivy Joe Hunter	Running back	7	182	Indianapolis Colts
Chris Chenault	Linebacker	8	222	Cincinnati Bengals
Charlie Darrington	Tight end	9	233	Washington Redskins
