= Eric Mitchell =

Eric Mitchell may refer to:

- Eric Mitchell (boxer), professional boxer
- Eric Mitchell (filmmaker), French-born writer, director and actor
- Eric Mitchell (skier) (born 1992), Canadian ski jumper
- Eric Mitchell (Eastenders), a fictional character in the soap opera
