= Brian Smith (linebacker, born 1966) =

American football player (born 1966)

No. 96, 78
- Positions: Linebacker, defensive tackle

Personal information
- Born: April 23, 1966 (age 60); New York, New York, U.S.
- Listed height: 6 ft 6 in (1.98 m)
- Listed weight: 242 lb (110 kg)

Career information
- High school: Opelika (Opelika, Alabama)
- College: Auburn
- NFL draft: 1989: 2nd round, 48th overall pick

Career history
- Los Angeles Rams (1989–1990); Minnesota Vikings (1992)*; New York/New Jersey Knights (1992)
- * Offseason or practice squad member only

Career NFL statistics
- Sacks: 3
- Stats at Pro Football Reference

Brian Mark Smith (born April 23, 1966) is an American former professional football player who was a linebacker for the Los Angeles Rams of the National Football League (NFL). He was selected 48th overall by the Rams in the second round of the 1989 NFL draft. Smith played college football for the Auburn Tigers.
