= 1988 Georgia Bulldogs football team =

American college football season

1988 Georgia Bulldogs football

Gator Bowl champion

Gator Bowl, W 34–27 vs. Michigan State
- Conference: Southeastern Conference

Ranking
- Coaches: No. 15
- AP: No. 15
- Record: 9–3 (5–2 SEC)
- Head coach: Vince Dooley (25th season)
- Offensive coordinator: George Haffner (9th season)
- Home stadium: Sanford Stadium

1988 Southeastern Conference football standings
| | Conf. | | | | | Overall |
| Team | W | | L | | T | W | | L | | T |
|---|---|---|---|---|---|---|---|---|---|---|
| No. 19 LSU + | 6 | – | 1 | – | 0 | 8 | – | 4 | – | 0 |
| No. 8 Auburn + | 6 | – | 1 | – | 0 | 10 | – | 2 | – | 0 |
| No. 15 Georgia | 5 | – | 2 | – | 0 | 9 | – | 3 | – | 0 |
| No. 17 Alabama | 4 | – | 3 | – | 0 | 9 | – | 3 | – | 0 |
| Florida | 4 | – | 3 | – | 0 | 7 | – | 5 | – | 0 |
| Tennessee | 3 | – | 4 | – | 0 | 5 | – | 6 | – | 0 |
| Ole Miss | 3 | – | 4 | – | 0 | 5 | – | 6 | – | 0 |
| Kentucky | 2 | – | 5 | – | 0 | 5 | – | 6 | – | 0 |
| Vanderbilt | 2 | – | 5 | – | 0 | 3 | – | 8 | – | 0 |
| Mississippi State | 0 | – | 7 | – | 0 | 1 | – | 10 | – | 0 |
+ – Conference co-champions; Rankings from AP Poll

The 1988 Georgia Bulldogs football team represented the University of Georgia as a member of the Southeastern Conference (SEC) during the 1988 NCAA Division I-A football season. Led by 25th-year head coach Vince Dooley, the Bulldogs compiled an overall record of 9–3, with a mark of 5–2 in conference play, and finished third in the SEC.

== Schedule ==
| Date | Opponent | Rank | Site | TV | Result | Attendance | Source |
|---|---|---|---|---|---|---|---|
| September 3 | No. 18 Tennessee | No. 12 | Sanford Stadium; Athens, GA (rivalry) | ESPN | W 28–17 | 82,122 | |
| September 10 | TCU* | No. 8 | Sanford Stadium; Athens, GA | | W 38–10 | 72,680 | |
| September 17 | at Mississippi State | No. 7 | Scott Field; Starkville, MS | | W 42–35 | 35,364 | |
| September 24 | at No. 14 South Carolina* | No. 6 | Williams–Brice Stadium; Columbia, SC (rivalry) | TBS | L 10–23 | 74,800 | |
| October 1 | Ole Miss | No. 15 | Sanford Stadium; Athens, GA | | W 36–12 | 82,077 | |
| October 8 | Vanderbilt | No. 15 | Sanford Stadium; Athens, GA (rivalry) | | W 41–22 | 81,804 | |
| October 22 | at Kentucky | No. 11 | Commonwealth Stadium; Lexington, KY | TBS | L 10–16 | 50,416 | |
| October 29 | William & Mary*^{†} | No. 18 | Sanford Stadium; Athens, GA | | W 59–24 | 80,712 | |
| November 5 | vs. Florida | No. 19 | Gator Bowl Stadium; Jacksonville, FL (rivalry) | TBS | W 26–3 | 81,958 | |
| November 12 | at No. 9 Auburn | No. 17 | Jordan-Hare Stadium; Auburn, AL (rivalry) | CBS | L 10–20 | 85,214 | |
| November 26 | Georgia Tech* | No. 20 | Sanford Stadium; Athens, GA (rivalry) | TBS | W 24–3 | 82,011 | |
| January 1, 1989 | vs. Michigan State* | No. 19 | Gator Bowl Stadium; Jacksonville, FL (Gator Bowl) | ESPN | W 34–27 | 76,236 | |
*Non-conference game; ^{†}Homecoming; Rankings from AP Poll released prior to the game

== Personnel ==
1988 Georgia Bulldogs football team roster
Players
Coaches
Offense

| Pos. | # | Name | Class |
|---|---|---|---|
| OT | 75 | Scott Adams | Sr |
| G | 61 | Shelly Anderson | Sr |
| TE | 85 | Chris Broom |
| RB | 37 | Brian Cleveland | So |
| OT | 72 | Will Colley | So |
| FB | 33 | Alphonso Ellis | So |
| RB | 7 | Rodney Hampton | So |
| RB | 30 | Keith Henderson | Jr |
| WR | 6 | Sean Hummings | So |
| QB | 18 | Wayne Johnson | Sr |
| WR | 12 | Arthur Marshall | Fr |
| OT | 50 | Curt Mull | Jr |
| TE | 87 | Troy Sadowski | Sr |
| QB | 11 | Greg Talley | Fr |
| WR | 9 | John Thomas | Sr |
| RB | | Larry Ware |
| TE | 83 | Kirk Warner | Jr |
| C | 63 | Todd Wheeler | Sr |
| RB | 38 | Tim Worley | Jr |

Defense

| Pos. | # | Name | Class |
|---|---|---|---|
| LB | 44 | John Allen | Fr |
| FS | 20 | Rusty Beasley | Sr |
| LB | 93 | Brent Collins | Jr |
| LB | 53 | Demetrius Douglas | Jr |
| DT | 97 | Paul Giles | Sr |
| DT | 95 | Bill Goldberg | Jr |
| LB | 84 | Vince Guthrie | Sr |
| CB | 25 | David Hargett | So |
| LB | 57 | Mo Lewis | So |
| DL | 94 | Wycliffe Lovelace | Sr |
| CB | 26 | Ben Smith | Jr |
| LB | 92 | Richard Tardits | Sr |
| LB | 60 | Terrie Webster | Sr |
| CB | 22 | George Wynn |

Special teams

| Pos. | # | Name | Class |
|---|---|---|---|
| K | 5 | Steve Crumley | Sr |
| P | 1 | Joey Hester | Jr |
| K | 3 | John Kasay | So |

Head coach

- Vince Dooley

Coordinators/assistant coaches

- Joe Hollis
  (Offensive line)

Legend

- (C) Team captain
- (S) Suspended
- (I) Ineligible
- Injured
- Redshirt

Roster
Last update: 2020-Dec-29
