= 1988 Alabama Crimson Tide football team =

American college football season

1988 Alabama Crimson Tide football

Sun Bowl champion

Sun Bowl, W 29–28 vs. Army
- Conference: Southeastern Conference

Ranking
- Coaches: No. 17
- AP: No. 17
- Record: 9–3 (4–3 SEC)
- Head coach: Bill Curry (2nd season)
- Offensive coordinator: Homer Smith (1st season)
- Defensive coordinator: Don Lindsey (2nd season)
- Captains: Derrick Thomas; David Smith
- Home stadium: Bryant–Denny Stadium; Legion Field

1988 Southeastern Conference football standings
	Conf.					Overall
Team	W		L		T	W		L		T
No. 19 LSU +	6	–	1	–	0	8	–	4	–	0
No. 8 Auburn +	6	–	1	–	0	10	–	2	–	0
No. 15 Georgia	5	–	2	–	0	9	–	3	–	0
No. 17 Alabama	4	–	3	–	0	9	–	3	–	0
Florida	4	–	3	–	0	7	–	5	–	0
Tennessee	3	–	4	–	0	5	–	6	–	0
Ole Miss	3	–	4	–	0	5	–	6	–	0
Kentucky	2	–	5	–	0	5	–	6	–	0
Vanderbilt	2	–	5	–	0	3	–	8	–	0
Mississippi State	0	–	7	–	0	1	–	10	–	0
+ – Conference co-champions; Rankings from AP Poll

The 1988 Alabama Crimson Tide football team (variously "Alabama", "Bama" or "The Tide") represented the University of Alabama in the 1988 NCAA Division I-A football season. It was the Crimson Tide's 96th overall and 55th season as a member of the Southeastern Conference (SEC). The team was led by head coach Bill Curry, in his second year, and played their home games at both Bryant-Denny Stadium in Tuscaloosa and Legion Field in Birmingham, Alabama. They finished the season with a record of nine wins and three losses (9–3 overall, 4–3 in the SEC) and with a victory in the Sun Bowl over the Army.

Alabama suffered close losses to rivals LSU and Auburn in November, but the low point of the season was a 22–12 loss on homecoming to Ole Miss, Alabama's first ever loss against Ole Miss in the state of Alabama. Alabama had zero yards passing in the game. Highlights included a victory over Penn State, Alabama's third consecutive victory over Tennessee, and a come-from-behind 29–28 victory in the Sun Bowl over Army in which quarterback David Smith threw for 412 yards, an all-time bowl record for an Alabama quarterback.

Alabama's road game against Texas A&M, originally scheduled for September 17, was postponed to December 1 when Curry declined to make the trip, worried about oncoming Hurricane Gilbert. When Gilbert made landfall in Mexico and the weather in College Station was clear on gameday, A&M fans called Alabama's coach "Chicken Curry". Alabama won the rescheduled game on December 1 by a final score of 30–10.

The 8–3 victory vs. Penn State was the last time the Crimson Tide hosted a major non-conference opponent at Legion Field. From 1989 through its final game there in 2003, Alabama only played lesser-known non-conference opponents in Birmingham, although series vs. SEC rivals Tennessee and Auburn remained at Legion Field through 1997 and 1998, respectively.

== Schedule ==
Date	Time	Opponent	Rank	Site	TV	Result	Attendance	Source
September 10	6:00 p.m.	at Temple*	No. 14	Veterans Stadium; Philadelphia, PA		W 37–0	28,680	
September 24	1:00 p.m.	Vanderbilt	No. 13	Bryant–Denny Stadium; Tuscaloosa, AL		W 44–10	70,123	
October 1	11:30 a.m.	at Kentucky	No. 12	Commonwealth Stadium; Lexington, KY	TBS	W 31–27	53,442	
October 8	11:30 a.m.	Ole Miss^{†}	No. 12	Bryant–Denny Stadium; Tuscaloosa, AL (rivalry)	TBS	L 12–22	70,123	
October 15	12:00 p.m.	at Tennessee		Neyland Stadium; Knoxville, TN (Third Saturday in October)		W 28–20	93,025	
October 22	1:30 p.m.	Penn State*		Legion Field; Birmingham, AL (rivalry)	CBS	W 8–3	75,808–75,962	
October 29	1:00 p.m.	at Mississippi State	No. 19	Scott Field; Starkville, MS (rivalry)		W 53–34	41,088	
November 5	1:30 p.m.	No. 13 LSU	No. 18	Bryant–Denny Stadium; Tuscaloosa, AL (rivalry)	CBS	L 18–19	70,123	
November 12	1:00 p.m.	Southwestern Louisiana*	No. 18	Legion Field; Birmingham, AL		W 17–0	66,537	
November 25	1:30 p.m.	No. 7 Auburn	No. 17	Legion Field; Birmingham, AL (Iron Bowl)	CBS	L 10–15	75,962	
December 1	7:30 p.m.	at Texas A&M*	No. 20	Kyle Field; College Station, TX	ESPN	W 30–10	59,152	
December 24	11:00 a.m.	vs. Army*	No. 20	Sun Bowl; El Paso, TX (Sun Bowl)	CBS	W 29–28	48,719	
*Non-conference game; ^{†}Homecoming; Rankings from AP Poll released prior to the game; All times are in Central time

== Game summaries ==
=== Texas A&M ===
Team	1	2	3	4	Total
• Alabama	7	6	0	17	30
Texas A&M	3	0	7	0	10

- Date: December 1
- Location: Kyle Field
- Game attendance: 59,152
- Game weather: 45 °F (7 °C); wind 5 mph (8.0 km/h) N

Scoring summary
Q1	9:07	ALA	Stewart 10 yard pass from Smith (Doyle kick)	ALA 7–0
Q1	5:43	A&M	Slater 49 yard field goal	ALA 7–3
Q2	5:02	ALA	Doyle 39 yard field goal	ALA 10–3
Q2	2:50	ALA	Doyle 42 yard field goal	ALA 13–3
Q3	10:40	A&M	Wilson 1 yard run (Slater kick)	ALA 13–10
Q4	10:13	ALA	Turner 8 yard pass from Smith (Doyle kick)	ALA 20–10
Q4	6:42	ALA	Doyle 30 yard field goal	ALA 23–10
Q4	2:41	ALA	Hill 10 yard run (Doyle kick)	ALA 30–10

== Roster ==
1988 Alabama Crimson Tide football team roster
Players
Coaches
Offense

Pos.	#	Name	Class
TE	85	Howard Cross	Sr
RB	26	Bobby Humphrey	Sr

Defense

Pos.	#	Name	Class
LB	86	Keith McCants	So
LB	55	Derrick Thomas	Sr

Special teams

Pos.	#	Name	Class
K	17	Philip Doyle	So
P	3	Chris Mohr	Sr

Head coach

- Bill Curry

Coordinators/assistant coaches

- Homer Smith – Offensive coordinator

Legend

- (C) Team captain
- (S) Suspended
- (I) Ineligible
- Injured
- Redshirt

== 1989 NFL draft ==
Player	Position	Round	Pick	NFL club
Derrick Thomas	Linebacker	1	4	Kansas City Chiefs
Greg Gilbert	Linebacker	5	136	Chicago Bears
Chris Mohr	Punter	6	146	Tampa Bay Buccaneers
Howard Cross	Tight end	6	158	New York Giants
George Bethune	Linebacker	7	188	Los Angeles Rams
