= Keith DeLong =

American football player (born 1967)

No. 59
- Position: Linebacker

Personal information
- Born: August 14, 1967 (age 59); San Diego, California, U.S.
- Listed height: 6 ft 2 in (1.88 m)
- Listed weight: 235 lb (107 kg)

Career information
- High school: Lawrence (KS)
- College: Tennessee
- NFL draft: 1989: 1st round, 28th overall pick

Career history
- San Francisco 49ers (1989–1993)

Awards and highlights
- Super Bowl champion (XXIV); First-team All-American (1988); First-team All-SEC (1988); Second-team All-SEC (1987)

Career NFL statistics
- Sacks: 1
- Interceptions: 2
- Fumble recoveries: 6
- Stats at Pro Football Reference

Keith Allen DeLong (born August 14, 1967) is an American former professional football player who was a linebacker for the San Francisco 49ers of the National Football League (NFL) from 1989 to 1993. He was selected by the 49ers in the first round of the 1989 NFL draft with the 28th overall pick. He earned a Super Bowl ring in his rookie season, in Super Bowl XXIV.

DeLong is the son of SEC Legend and Outland Trophy winner Steve DeLong. He is one of only a handful of father/son combinations who both played at the NFL level. Both attended the University of Tennessee. He was married to Marla Murrah, the niece of country songwriter Roger Murrah, and they had three children, two daughters and a son.
