= Eric Ramsey =

American football player

Eric Ramsey was a defensive back for Auburn University's football team in the early 1990s who used a tape recorder to secretly record conversations between his football coaches and Booster "Corky" Frost regarding an illicit player payment scheme. Ramsey's allegations also included racist practices at Auburn, including disapproval of inter-racial dating in the community and segregation of black and white players in the resident athletic dorm. After his tapes were revealed, Auburn received strict penalties and NCAA probation. This scandal prompted Coach Pat Dye's resignation and preceded the hiring of Samford University football coach Terry Bowden.

== Background information ==
Eric Ramsey was born in the Birmingham suburb of Homewood, Alabama in 1968. He was signed by Auburn in the signing class of 1986 but was redshirted for the 1987 football season that culminated in Auburn's second SEC championship in five years. In 1989, he became a starter, and in 1990, he was a star defensive back on an Auburn team that went as high as number three in the nation. He was drafted in the tenth round of the 1991 NFL draft by the Kansas City Chiefs but was cut before training camp ended. In June 1991, the Montgomery-Advertiser newspaper printed a portion of an essay Ramsey wrote for his Sociology class. The article accused Auburn's football coaches of being "condescending" towards blacks and having a slave master mentality.

Another contributing factor to the scandal is believed to be the conflict within the Ramsey family. Former Auburn linebacker Aundray Bruce was married to Ramsey's wife's sister, making them brothers-in-law. Bruce was the overall number one pick in the 1988 NFL draft by the Atlanta Falcons and had received a substantial signing bonus.

== The scandal breaks ==
On Friday, September 27, 1991, Ramsey was the front-page story in the Montgomery Advertiser. He claimed to have received improper benefits including money in violation of NCAA rules. He further claimed that he had a collection of over 70 audio tapes to substantiate his allegations. He had retained Birmingham attorney Donald Watkins as legal counsel. His claims were supported by former Auburn fullback Alex Strong, who claimed that he had received "a couple of thousand a year" from former Auburn assistant Frank Young, before later recanting his claim.

Ramsey's most specific allegations centered on Auburn booster Bill "Corky" Frost. Ramsey alleged that Frost had made at least two of Ramsey's monthly car payments and given him steaks to help him gain weight. He also claimed Young had paid him $300 per month. The most damaging allegation, however, was pointed at Auburn coach and athletic director, Pat Dye, who he claimed had helped him receive an unsecured loan for over $9,000 in April 1990.

Ramsey's claims were opposed by several former Auburn stars including Bo Jackson, Frank Thomas, and his brother-in-law Aundray Bruce. All spoke out against Ramsey and denied they had ever received any improper benefits.

Auburn football coach and athletic director Pat Dye was in Boston meeting with an NCAA representative on the day the scandal broke. Dye was reporting the findings of an internal investigation into Auburn's basketball and tennis programs. Both were subsequently put on probation. Dye traveled to Knoxville, Tennessee for the SEC showdown with the Tennessee Volunteers, a game won by the Vols, 30–21. Dye made immediately clear that he was not going to comment on the scandal except 'through the proper channels,' referring to his attorneys. This was necessary because Dye's coaching contract had a clause permitting his instant dismissal if he had prior knowledge of NCAA rules violations.

Shortly after the scandal broke, Alex Strong met with Dye and then publicly recanted his claims.

On October 6, 1991, another former player, Vincent Harris, alleged in the Birmingham News that he had received payments from assistant coaches. However, Harris made no claims to possessing audio tapes or any other evidence.

The tapes became the subject of much speculation, including the theory they were spliced together to incriminate potential adversaries. Ramsey and Watkins eventually allowed the NCAA and 60 Minutes to authenticate the tapes. They kept the story in the news by playing some tapes for the Montgomery Advertiser during an open weekend on the Auburn football schedule. In early 1992, Ramsey played the tapes for the NCAA.

Just prior to the SEC match-up with Florida, Ramsey and Watkins released a tape that incriminated former Auburn track star and booster Corky Frost. The tape indicated that Frost, a wealthy man, had paid Ramsey a sum of money as well as given Ramsey steaks to help him gain weight as a freshman. It also indicated Frost had agreed to set up a payment plan for Ramsey to receive $100 for interceptions and $500 for touchdowns.

== The alleged Dye tapes ==
On November 14, 1991, Watkins played a tape for a Montgomery Advertiser reporter that was allegedly recorded in the spring of 1990. This story also noted that Ramsey had received an unsecured loan for $9,209.99 before his senior season began in violation of NCAA rules.

Auburn's football team, possibly distracted by the scandal, suffered their first losing season in a decade in 1991, going 5–6.

== Ramsey and the NCAA ==
Ramsey was first interviewed by an athletics representative from the NCAA on January 10, 1992. He was interviewed for a second time in March 1992, with subsequent interviews in August 1992 and a final interview on February 27, 1993.

The continuing investigation stretched into the 1992 football season. Auburn's new President, William Muse, hired a new athletic director to help with the investigation upon Dye's resignation as A.D. Meanwhile, both Eric Ramsey and his wife, Twilitta, graduated from Auburn. Twilitta made obscene gestures at the booing commencement crowd.

== 1992 ==
The story continued and consumed the entire year of 1992. In January, Ramsey appeared on 60 Minutes and repeated his allegations. Because the NCAA had requested that all parties refrain from speaking to the media, no defense was presented for Auburn.

In May 1992, Dye resigned as athletic director and was replaced by former Washington athletic director Mike Lude, who was also president of the Blockbuster Bowl. Lude was also well connected at the NCAA, and the hope was that he would enable Auburn to deal with the inevitable penalties.

On November 11, 1992, the NCAA's formal letter of inquiry arrived at Auburn. The football program was charged with nine violations.

== Sanctions ==
The NCAA determined that athletics representatives had provided Ramsey with at least $4,000 of merchandise and payments as well as a booster providing Ramsey with $500. It also determined the $9,200 loan from Colonial Bank to be an NCAA violation and charged Auburn with three major ethical violations: 1) lack on institutional control; 2) unethical conduct; and 3) erroneous certification of compliance with NCAA regulations. They also mandated the dismissal of Dye as both coach and athletic director (already invoked by Dye himself) and the discontinuance of association with two boosters. In all, Auburn was specifically charged with nine violations of NCAA rules. Because the story broke before the probations of both the basketball and tennis teams began, Auburn was not considered a candidate for the repeat violator punishment by the NCAA.

On August 18, 1993, Auburn was hit with some of the most severe penalties in the history of the NCAA (at that time). These included a two-year bowl ban, a one-year television ban (for the 1993 season), and the loss of 13 scholarships spread out over a four-year period. Dye was also banned from any appearance at an Auburn function until August 1995. The probation period, while enforced at the beginning of the 1993 season, did not actually start until the 1991 probations of the basketball and tennis teams ended. The probation therefore extended until Thanksgiving 1995.

== Aftermath ==
Auburn replaced Dye with Samford University coach Terry Bowden. Auburn then went unbeaten in their first twenty games of Bowden's tenure.

Ramsey and wife graduated together from Auburn in 1992.

== Sources ==
- Thomas, Robert McG., Jr. (August 19, 1993). FOOTBALL; Tapes bring Auburn penalties.
- Brown, Scott and Collier, Will. "The Uncivil War: The Iron Bowl, 1981–1994.
