= 1988 LSU Tigers football team =

American college football season

1988 LSU Tigers football

SEC co-champion

Hall of Fame Bowl, L 10–23 vs. Syracuse
- Conference: Southeastern Conference

Ranking
- AP: No. 19
- Record: 8–4 (6–1 SEC)
- Head coach: Mike Archer (2nd season)
- Offensive coordinator: Ed Zaunbrecher (4th season)
- Offensive scheme: Multiple
- Defensive coordinator: Pete Jenkins (3rd season)
- Base defense: 3–4
- Home stadium: Tiger Stadium

1988 Southeastern Conference football standings
	Conf.					Overall
Team	W		L		T	W		L		T
No. 19 LSU +	6	–	1	–	0	8	–	4	–	0
No. 8 Auburn +	6	–	1	–	0	10	–	2	–	0
No. 15 Georgia	5	–	2	–	0	9	–	3	–	0
No. 17 Alabama	4	–	3	–	0	9	–	3	–	0
Florida	4	–	3	–	0	7	–	5	–	0
Tennessee	3	–	4	–	0	5	–	6	–	0
Ole Miss	3	–	4	–	0	5	–	6	–	0
Kentucky	2	–	5	–	0	5	–	6	–	0
Vanderbilt	2	–	5	–	0	3	–	8	–	0
Mississippi State	0	–	7	–	0	1	–	10	–	0
+ – Conference co-champions; Rankings from AP Poll

The 1988 LSU Tigers football team represented Louisiana State University during the 1988 NCAA Division I-A football season. The team was led by Mike Archer in his second season and finished with an overall record of eight wins and four losses (8–4 overall, 6–1 in the SEC), as Southeastern Conference (SEC) co-champion and with a loss against Syracuse in the Hall of Fame Bowl.

Despite a 7-6 win over fellow co-champion Auburn in the Earthquake Game, the Sugar Bowl chose Auburn to represent the SEC for the second consecutive season.

== Schedule ==
Date	Time	Opponent	Rank	Site	TV	Result	Attendance	Source
September 3	7:00 p.m.	No. 11 Texas A&M*	No. 17	Tiger Stadium; Baton Rouge, LA (rivalry)	PPV	W 27–0	79,018	
September 17	11:30 a.m.	at Tennessee	No. 9	Neyland Stadium; Knoxville, TN	TBS	W 34–9	92,849	
September 24	2:30 p.m.	at Ohio State*	No. 7	Ohio Stadium; Columbus, OH	ABC	L 33–36	90,584	
October 1	2:30 p.m.	at No. 17 Florida	No. 14	Florida Field; Gainesville, FL (rivalry)	CBS	L 6–19	74,264	
October 8	6:00 p.m.	No. 4 Auburn		Tiger Stadium; Baton Rouge, LA (Earthquake Game, rivalry)	ESPN	W 7–6	79,431	
October 15	7:00 p.m.	Kentucky	No. 19	Tiger Stadium; Baton Rouge, LA	PPV	W 15–12	71,418	
October 29	11:30 a.m.	Ole Miss^{†}	No. 13	Tiger Stadium; Baton Rouge, LA (rivalry)	TBS	W 31–20	79,114	
November 5	2:00 p.m.	at No. 18 Alabama	No. 13	Bryant–Denny Stadium; Tuscaloosa, AL (rivalry)	CBS	W 19–18	70,123	
November 12	11:30 a.m.	at Mississippi State	No. 12	Scott Field; Starkville, MS (rivalry)	TBS	W 20–3	30,019	
November 19	8:00 p.m.	No. 3 Miami (FL)*	No. 11	Tiger Stadium; Baton Rouge, LA	ESPN	L 3–44	79,528	
November 26	7:00 p.m.	Tulane*	No. 16	Tiger Stadium; Baton Rouge, LA (Battle for the Rag)	PPV	W 44–14	75,497	
January 2, 1989	12:00 p.m.	vs. No. 17 Syracuse*	No. 16	Tampa Stadium; Tampa, FL (Hall of Fame Bowl)	NBC	L 10–23	51,112	
*Non-conference game; ^{†}Homecoming; Rankings from AP Poll released prior to the game; All times are in Central time

== Roster ==
1988 LSU Tigers football team roster
Players
Coaches
Offense

Pos.	#	Name	Class
QB	13	Tommy Hodson	Jr
WR	49	Todd Kinchen	Fr

Defense

Pos.	#	Name	Class
DB	18	Stephen Harris	Fr
SS	19	Corey Raymond	Fr
LB	54	Eric Hill	Sr

Special teams

Pos.	#	Name	Class

Head coach

- Mike Archer

Coordinators/assistant coaches

- Ed Zaunbrecher – Offensive coordinator/quarterbacks
- Jesse Daigle – Running backs
- Jerry Sullivan – Wide receivers
- Marty Galbraith – Offensive line
- Pete Jenkins – Defensive coordinator/defensive line
- Joe Wessel – Inside linebackers
- John Mitchell – Outside linebackers
- John Fontes – Defensive backs

Legend

- (C) Team captain
- (S) Suspended
- (I) Ineligible
- Injured
- Redshirt

Roster

== Team players drafted into the NFL ==
Player	Position	Round	Pick	NFL team
Eric Hill	Linebacker	1	10	Arizona Cardinals
