= 1988 Florida Gators football team =

American college football season

1988 Florida Gators football
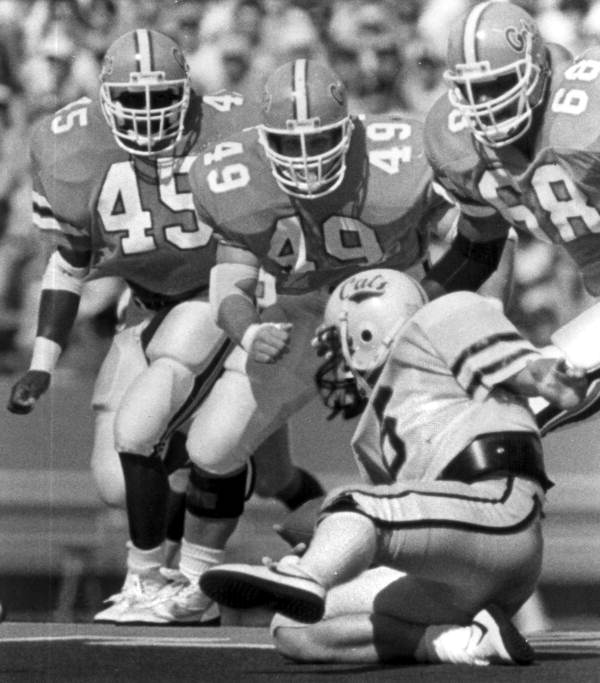

All-American Bowl, W 14–10 vs. Illinois
- Conference: Southeastern Conference
- Record: 7–5 (4–3 SEC)
- Head coach: Galen Hall (5th season)
- Offensive coordinator: Lynn Amadee (1st season)
- Defensive coordinator: Gary Darnell (1st season)
- Home stadium: Florida Field

1988 Southeastern Conference football standings
	Conf.					Overall
Team	W		L		T	W		L		T
No. 19 LSU +	6	–	1	–	0	8	–	4	–	0
No. 8 Auburn +	6	–	1	–	0	10	–	2	–	0
No. 15 Georgia	5	–	2	–	0	9	–	3	–	0
No. 17 Alabama	4	–	3	–	0	9	–	3	–	0
Florida	4	–	3	–	0	7	–	5	–	0
Tennessee	3	–	4	–	0	5	–	6	–	0
Ole Miss	3	–	4	–	0	5	–	6	–	0
Kentucky	2	–	5	–	0	5	–	6	–	0
Vanderbilt	2	–	5	–	0	3	–	8	–	0
Mississippi State	0	–	7	–	0	1	–	10	–	0
+ – Conference co-champions; Rankings from AP Poll

The 1988 Florida Gators football team represented the University of Florida during the 1988 NCAA Division I-A football season. The season was Galen Hall's fifth as the head coach of the Florida Gators football team. Hall's 1988 Florida Gators finished with a 7–5 overall record and a Southeastern Conference (SEC) record of 4–3, tying for fourth place among the ten SEC teams.

The Gators started the 1988 season 5–0 and were ranked as high as No. 14. During an October game against the Memphis State Tigers, star running back Emmitt Smith injured his knee and was unable to play for a month. Florida lost the Memphis State contest and the next three as well, with the Gator offense unable to score a single touchdown while Smith was sidelined. The offense under coordinator Lynn Amadee struggled all season, with Gator quarterbacks combining to throw three touchdowns and 17 interceptions, leading one Florida sports columnist to dub the offense the "Amadeeville Horror". Defensive tackle Trace Armstrong was All-SEC in 1988, setting a new school, single-season record for tackles for a loss with nineteen, including seven sacks. In both 1987 and 1988, walk-on safety Louis Oliver was an All-American.

As of the conclusion of the 2023 season, Florida's 16-0 loss to Auburn on October 29, 1988 is the last time the Gators suffered a shutout, and Florida has scored in an all-time NCAA record 457 consecutive games.

== Schedule ==
Date	Time	Opponent	Rank	Site	TV	Result	Attendance	Source
September 3		Montana State*		Florida Field; Gainesville, FL		W 69–0	69,121	
September 10	7:00 p.m.	at Ole Miss	No. 18	Mississippi Veterans Memorial Stadium; Jackson, MS		W 27–15	42,000	
September 17		Indiana State*		Florida Field; Gainesville, FL		W 58–0	70,147	
September 24		Mississippi State	No. 20	Florida Field; Gainesville, FL		W 17–0	73,138	
October 1	3:30 p.m.	No. 14 LSU	No. 17	Florida Field; Gainesville, FL (rivalry)	CBS	W 19–6	74,264	
October 8		Memphis State*	No. 14	Florida Field; Gainesville, FL		L 11–17	73,194	
October 15		at Vanderbilt	No. 20	Vanderbilt Stadium; Nashville, TN	TBS	L 9–24	41,000	
October 29		No. 9 Auburn^{†}		Florida Field; Gainesville, FL (rivalry)	ESPN	L 0–16	75,199	
November 5		vs. No. 19 Georgia		Gator Bowl Stadium; Jacksonville, FL (rivalry)	TBS	L 3–26	81,958	
November 12		at Kentucky		Commonwealth Stadium; Lexington, KY (rivalry)		W 24–19	51,191	
November 26	7:30 p.m.	at No. 5 Florida State*		Doak Campbell Stadium; Tallahassee, FL (rivalry)	ESPN	L 17–52	62,693	
December 29		vs. Illinois*		Legion Field; Birmingham, AL (All-American Bowl)	ESPN	W 14–10	48,218	
*Non-conference game; ^{†}Homecoming; Rankings from AP Poll released prior to the game; All times are in Eastern time

== Roster ==
1988 Florida Gators football team roster
Players
Coaches
Offense

Pos.	#	Name	Class
OL		Hesham Ismail	Fr
FB	38	Willie McGrady	So
WR	14	Ernie Mills	So
QB	1	Kyle Morris	So
RB	22	Emmitt Smith	So

Defense

Pos.	#	Name	Class
DE	93	Trace Armstrong	Sr
DT	50	Brad Culpepper	Fr
LB	49	Joey Nicoletto	Sr
DL	68	Rhondy Weston	Sr
DB	41	John Spierto	Sr

Special teams

Pos.	#	Name	Class

Head coach

- Galen Hall

Coordinators/assistant coaches

- Lynn Amadee – Offensive coordinator
- Gary Darnell – Defensive coordinator
- Charlie Strong – Outside linebackers coach
- Brian Borland – Graduate assistant

Legend

- (C) Team captain
- (S) Suspended
- (I) Ineligible
- Injured
- Redshirt
