= 1988 Ole Miss Rebels football team =

American college football season

1988 Ole Miss Rebels football
- Conference: Southeastern Conference
- Record: 5–6 (3–4 SEC)
- Head coach: Billy Brewer (6th season)
- Offensive coordinator: Red Parker (1st season)
- Defensive coordinator: Robert Henry (1st season)
- Home stadium: Vaught–Hemingway Stadium; Mississippi Veterans Memorial Stadium

1988 Southeastern Conference football standings
| | Conf. | | | | | Overall |
| Team | W | | L | | T | W | | L | | T |
|---|---|---|---|---|---|---|---|---|---|---|
| No. 19 LSU + | 6 | – | 1 | – | 0 | 8 | – | 4 | – | 0 |
| No. 8 Auburn + | 6 | – | 1 | – | 0 | 10 | – | 2 | – | 0 |
| No. 15 Georgia | 5 | – | 2 | – | 0 | 9 | – | 3 | – | 0 |
| No. 17 Alabama | 4 | – | 3 | – | 0 | 9 | – | 3 | – | 0 |
| Florida | 4 | – | 3 | – | 0 | 7 | – | 5 | – | 0 |
| Tennessee | 3 | – | 4 | – | 0 | 5 | – | 6 | – | 0 |
| Ole Miss | 3 | – | 4 | – | 0 | 5 | – | 6 | – | 0 |
| Kentucky | 2 | – | 5 | – | 0 | 5 | – | 6 | – | 0 |
| Vanderbilt | 2 | – | 5 | – | 0 | 3 | – | 8 | – | 0 |
| Mississippi State | 0 | – | 7 | – | 0 | 1 | – | 10 | – | 0 |
+ – Conference co-champions; Rankings from AP Poll

The 1988 Ole Miss Rebels football team represented the University of Mississippi as a member of the Southeastern Conference during the 1988 NCAA Division I-A football season. Led by sixth-year head coach Billy Brewer, the Rebels compiled an overall record of 5–6 with a mark of 3–4 in conference play, tying for sixth place in the SEC.

== Schedule ==
| Date | Time | Opponent | Site | TV | Result | Attendance | Source |
|---|---|---|---|---|---|---|---|
| September 3 | 6:00 pm | Memphis State* | Mississippi Veterans Memorial Stadium; Jackson, MS (rivalry) | | W 24–6 | 32,036 | |
| September 10 | 6:00 pm | No. 18 Florida | Mississippi Veterans Memorial Stadium; Jackson, MS | | L 15–27 | 42,000 | |
| September 17 | 6:00 pm | at Arkansas* | War Memorial Stadium; Little Rock, AR (rivalry) | | L 13–21 | 55,360 | |
| October 1 | 2:00 pm | at No. 15 Georgia | Sanford Stadium; Athens, GA | | L 12–36 | 82,077 | |
| October 8 | 11:35 am | at No. 12 Alabama | Bryant–Denny Stadium; Tuscaloosa, AL (rivalry) | TBS | W 22–12 | 70,123 | |
| October 15 | 1:00 pm | Arkansas State* | Vaught–Hemingway Stadium; Oxford, MS | | W 25–22 | 24,476 | |
| October 22 | 1:00 pm | at Vanderbilt | Vanderbilt Stadium; Nashville, TN (rivalry) | | W 36–28 | 41,276 | |
| October 29 | 11:35 am | at No. 13 LSU | Tiger Stadium; Baton Rouge, LA (rivalry) | TBS | L 20–31 | 79,114 | |
| November 5 | 1:00 pm | Tulane* | Vaught–Hemingway Stadium; Oxford, MS (rivalry) | | L 9–14 | 27,531 | |
| November 12 | 1:00 pm | Tennessee | Vaught–Hemingway Stadium; Oxford, MS (rivalry) | | L 12–20 | 27,686 | |
| November 26 | 1:00 pm | vs. Mississippi State | Mississippi Veterans Memorial Stadium; Jackson, MS (Egg Bowl) | | W 33–6 | 28,000 | |
*Non-conference game; Rankings from AP Poll released prior to the game

== Roster ==
1988 Ole Miss Rebels football team roster
Players
Coaches
Offense

| Pos. | # | Name | Class |
|---|---|---|---|
| TE | | Wesley Walls |
| QB | 14 | Mark Young |

Defense

| Pos. | # | Name | Class |

Special teams

| Pos. | # | Name | Class |

Head coach

- Billy Brewer

Coordinators/assistant coaches

- Keith Daniels
  (Running backs coach)

Legend

- (C) Team captain
- (S) Suspended
- (I) Ineligible
- Injured
- Redshirt
