= Bob Stull =

American football player and coach

Biographical details
- Born: November 21, 1945 (age 80); Davenport, Iowa, U.S.

Playing career
- 1965–1967: Kansas State

Coaching career (HC unless noted)
- 1971–1974: Kent State (OL)
- 1975–1978: Washington (WR)
- 1979–1983: Washington (OC)
- 1984–1985: UMass
- 1986–1988: UTEP
- 1989–1993: Missouri

Administrative career (AD unless noted)
- 1998–2017: UTEP

Head coaching record
- Overall: 46–65–2
- Bowls: 0–1

Bob Stull (born November 21, 1945) is an American retired college football coach, player, and administrator. He is the former athletic director at the University of Texas at El Paso (UTEP), a position he held from 1998 to 2017. Stull served as head football coach at the University of Massachusetts Amherst, (1984–1985), UTEP (1986–1988), and the University of Missouri (1989–1993), compiling a career college football record of 46–65–2.

== Early life and playing career ==
A native of Davenport, Iowa, Stull was a three-year letterman at Kansas State University, where he earned bachelor's and master's degrees.

== Coaching career ==
Stull began his coaching career at Dubuque Senior High School in Dubuque, Iowa. He was the offensive line coach at Kent State from 1971 to 1974 under Don James. He then followed James to Washington, where he was receivers coach (1975–1978) and later offensive coordinator (1979–1983).

After two seasons at Massachusetts, Stull was hired at UTEP, where he posted a 21–15 record from 1986 to 1988, culminating in a 10–2 record and an appearance in the 1988 Independence Bowl. Stull didn't fare as well at the University of Missouri, compiling a 15–38–2 record in five seasons. While at Missouri, he coached on the losing end of the infamous "Fifth Down Game".

== Administrative career ==
After his coaching career, Stull was director of the Girls and Boys Clubs of Seattle before entering administration at the University of Washington. He rejoined UTEP as athletic director after a 10-year absence. On August 31, 2017, Stull announced his retirement as UTEP's athletic director after 19 years at the helm.

== Head coaching record ==
Year	Team	Overall	Conference	Standing	Bowl/playoffs
UMass Minutemen (Yankee Conference) (1984–1985)
1984	UMass	3–8	1–4	5th	
1985	UMass	7–4	4–1	2nd	
UMass:		10–12	5–5		
UTEP Miners (Western Athletic Conference) (1986–1988)
1986	UTEP	4–8	2–6	8th	
1987	UTEP	7–4	5–3	4th	
1988	UTEP	10–3	6–2	2nd	L Independence
UTEP:		21–15	13–11		
Missouri Tigers (Big Eight Conference) (1989–1993)
1989	Missouri	2–9	1–6	7th	
1990	Missouri	4–7	2–5	T–6th	
1991	Missouri	3–7–1	1–6	7th	
1992	Missouri	3–8	2–5	T–6th	
1993	Missouri	3–7–1	2–5	T–6th	
Missouri:		15–38–2	8–27		
Total:		46–65–2			
