= 1988 BYU Cougars football team =

American college football season

1988 BYU Cougars football

Freedom Bowl champion

Freedom Bowl, W 20–17 vs. Colorado
- Conference: Western Athletic Conference
- Record: 9–4 (5–3 WAC)
- Head coach: LaVell Edwards (17th season)
- Offensive coordinator: Roger French (8th season)
- Offensive scheme: West Coast
- Defensive coordinator: Dick Felt (14th season)
- Base defense: 4–3
- Home stadium: Cougar Stadium

1988 Western Athletic Conference football standings
	Conf.					Overall
Team	W		L		T	W		L		T
Wyoming $	8	–	0	–	0	11	–	2	–	0
UTEP	6	–	2	–	0	10	–	3	–	0
Hawaii	5	–	3	–	0	9	–	3	–	0
BYU	5	–	3	–	0	9	–	4	–	0
Utah	4	–	4	–	0	6	–	5	–	0
Air Force	3	–	5	–	0	5	–	7	–	0
San Diego State	3	–	5	–	0	3	–	8	–	0
New Mexico	1	–	7	–	0	2	–	10	–	0
Colorado State	1	–	7	–	0	1	–	10	–	0
$ – Conference champion

The 1988 BYU Cougars football team represented Brigham Young University during the 1988 NCAA Division I-A football season. The Cougars were led by 17th-year head coach LaVell Edwards and played their home games at Cougar Stadium in Provo, Utah. The team competed as members of the Western Athletic Conference, finishing tied for third with a record of 9–4 (5–3 WAC). BYU was invited to the 1988 Freedom Bowl, where they defeated Colorado.

== Schedule ==
Date	Opponent	Rank	Site	Result	Attendance	Source
September 1	at Wyoming		War Memorial Stadium; Laramie, WY	L 14–24	28,847	
September 8	No. 19 Texas*		Cougar Stadium; Provo, UT	W 47–6	64,249	
September 17	UTEP		Cougar Stadium; Provo, UT	W 31–27	64,099	
September 30	Utah State*		Cougar Stadium; Provo, UT (rivalry)	W 38–3	65,702	
October 8	Colorado State^{†}		Cougar Stadium; Provo, UT	W 42–7	65,281	
October 15	TCU*		Cougar Stadium; Provo, UT	W 31–18	64,103	
October 22	at Hawaii		Aloha Stadium; Halawa, HI	W 24–23	50,089	
October 29	New Mexico		Cougar Stadium; Provo, UT	W 65–0	63,424	
November 5	at San Diego State	No. 20	Jack Murphy Stadium; San Diego, CA	L 15–27	21,825	
November 12	at Air Force		Falcon Stadium; Colorado Springs, CO	W 49–31	40,218	
November 19	at Utah		Robert Rice Stadium; Salt Lake City, UT (Holy War)	L 28–57	34,216	
December 3	at No. 2 Miami (FL)*		Miami Orange Bowl; Miami, FL	L 17–41	59,367	
December 29	vs. Colorado*		Anaheim Stadium; Anaheim, CA (Freedom Bowl)	W 20–17	35,941	
*Non-conference game; ^{†}Homecoming; Rankings from AP Poll released prior to the game

== Game summaries ==
=== Texas ===
#19 Texas Longhorns (0–0) at BYU Cougars (0–1)

Quarter	1	2	3	4	Total
Texas	3	3	0	0	6
BYU	10	10	7	20	47

at Cougar Stadium, Provo, Utah

- Date: September 8, 1988
- Game time: 6:00 p.m.
- Game weather: Clear, 87 °F (31 °C)
- Game attendance: 64,249
- Referee: Pat Sweeney
- TV: ESPN
- Box Score, Box Score

Game information

First quarter

- BYU – Bryce Doman 89-yard pass from Sean Covey (Earl Kauffman kick), 11:30. BYU 7–0.
- BYU – Earl Kauffman 31-yard field goal, 7:41. BYU 10–0.
- UT – Wayne Clements 41-yard field goal, 1:35. BYU 10–3.

Second quarter

- BYU – Chuck Cutler 52-yard pass from Sean Covey (Earl Kauffman kick), 14:18. BYU 17–3.
- BYU – Earl Kauffman 51-yard field goal, 12:38. BYU 20–3.
- UT – Wayne Clements 55-yard field goal, 10:47. BYU 20–6.

Third quarter

- BYU – Rodney Rice 70-yard interception return (Earl Kauffman kick), 2:16. BYU 27–6.

Fourth quarter

- BYU – Fred Whittingham 20-yard run (Earl Kauffman kick), 10:03. BYU 34–6.
- BYU – Chuck Cutler 20-yard pass from Ty Detmer (Earl Kauffman kick), 6:59. BYU 41–6.
- BYU – Eric Mortensen 17-yard run (kick failed), 4:54. BYU 47–6.

Top passers

- UT – Shannon Kelley – 11/32, 137 yards, 2 INT
- BYU – Sean Covey – 14/38, 323 yards, 2 TD, INT

Top rushers

- UT – Darron Norris – 14 rushes, 49 yards
- BYU – Fred Whittingham – 7 rushes, 63 yards

Top receivers

- UT – Tony Jones – 6 receptions, 107 yards
- BYU – Bryce Doman – 3 receptions, 124 yards, TD

External videos
- Full game
- Game highlights
- BYU highlights

=== At Air Force ===
BYU Cougars (7–2) at Air Force Falcons (5–4)

Quarter	1	2	3	4	Total
BYU	7	14	14	14	49
Air Force	10	7	14	0	31

at Falcon Stadium, Colorado Springs, Colorado

- Date: November 12, 1988
- Game weather: 44 °F (7 °C)
- Game attendance: 40,218
- Box Score

Game information

First quarter

- AFA – Steve Yarborough 44-yard field goal. Air Force 3–0.
- AFA – Greg Johnson 3-yard run (Steve Yarborough kick). Air Force 10–0.
- BYU – Fred Whittingham 3-yard run (Jason Chaffetz kick). Air Force 10–7.

Second quarter

- BYU – Sean Covey 1-yard run (Jason Chaffetz kick). BYU 14–10.
- AFA – Dee Dowis 4-yard run (Steve Yarborough kick). Air Force 17–14.
- BYU – Tyler Anderson 41-yard pass from Sean Covey (Jason Chaffetz kick). BYU 21–17.

Third quarter

- BYU – Matt Bellini 21-yard run (Jason Chaffetz kick). BYU 28–17.
- AFA – Dee Dowis 6-yard run (run failed). BYU 28–23.
- AFA – Dee Dowis 15-yard run (run good). Air Force 31–28.
- BYU – Tony Crutchfield 79-yard kickoff return. BYU 35–31.

Fourth quarter

- BYU – Sean Covey 2-yard run (Jason Chaffetz kick). BYU 42–31.
- BYU – Mike Salido 5-yard run (Jason Chaffetz kick). BYU 49–31.

Top passers

- BYU – Sean Covey – 10/16, 159 yards, TD
- AFA – Dee Dowis – 3/8, 97 yards, 2 INT

Top rushers

- BYU – Matt Bellini – 21 rushes, 138 yards, TD
- AFA – Greg Johnson – 15 rushes, 112 yards, TD

Top receivers

- BYU – Mike Salido – 4 receptions, 47 yards
- AFA – Albert Booker – 2 receptions, 58 yards

== Personnel ==
1988 BYU Cougars football team roster
Players
Coaches
Offense

Pos.	#	Name	Class
QB	10	Sean Covey	Sr
WR		Chuck Cutler
WR		Bryce Doman
FB	33	Freddie Whittingham
G	64	Mo Elewonibi

Defense

Pos.	#	Name	Class

Special teams

Pos.	#	Name	Class
K		Jason Chaffetz
K		Earl Kauffman

Head coach

- LaVell Edwards

Coordinators/assistant coaches

Legend

- (C) Team captain
- (S) Suspended
- (I) Ineligible
- Injured
- Redshirt
