= 1988 Western Michigan Broncos football team =

American college football season

1988 Western Michigan Broncos football

MAC champion

California Bowl, L 30–35 vs. Fresno State
- Conference: Mid-American Conference
- Record: 9–3 (7–1 MAC)
- Head coach: Al Molde (2nd season)
- Defensive coordinator: Larry Edlund (2nd season)
- Home stadium: Waldo Stadium

1988 Mid-American Conference football standings
	Conf.					Overall
Team	W		L		T	W		L		T
Western Michigan $	7	–	1	–	0	9	–	3	–	0
Eastern Michigan	5	–	2	–	1	6	–	3	–	1
Ball State	5	–	3	–	0	8	–	3	–	0
Central Michigan	5	–	3	–	0	7	–	4	–	0
Ohio	4	–	3	–	1	4	–	6	–	1
Toledo	4	–	4	–	0	6	–	5	–	0
Kent State	3	–	5	–	0	5	–	6	–	0
Bowling Green	1	–	6	–	1	2	–	8	–	1
Miami (OH)	0	–	7	–	1	0	–	10	–	1
$ – Conference champion

The 1988 Western Michigan Broncos football team was an American football team that represented Western Michigan University during the 1988 NCAA Division I-A football season. In their second season under head coach Al Molde, the Broncos compiled a 9–3 record, won the Mid-American Conference (MAC) championship, and lost to Fresno State in the 1988 California Bowl.

The win over Wisconsin at Camp Randall Stadium was Western Michigan's first ever over a Big Ten opponent in 12 attempts. Western Michigan had previously defeated Michigan Agricultural College (Michigan State) in 1917 and 1919, however those victories came prior to Michigan State's university status (1955) and Big Ten Conference membership (1953).

The team's statistical leaders were Tony Kimbrough with 2,831 passing yards, Robert Davis with 1,125 rushing yards, and Robert Oliver with 42 catches for 831 receiving yards. Kimbrough was selected as the MAC's most valuable player and the offensive player of the year. Offensive lineman Kevin Haverdink was selected by the Associated Press as a third-team All-American. Al Molde was named the MAC Coach of the Year.

== Schedule ==
Date	Opponent	Site	Result	Attendance	Source
September 3	at Wisconsin*	Camp Randall Stadium; Madison, WI	W 24–14	38,230	
September 10	at Toledo	Glass Bowl; Toledo, OH	W 31–9	17,946	
September 27	Illinois State*	Waldo Stadium; Kalamazoo, MI	W 44–14	22,207	
October 1	Bowling Green	Waldo Stadium; Kalamazoo, MI	W 37–10	23,758	
October 8	at Miami (OH)	Yager Stadium; Oxford, OH	W 41–18	17,915	
October 15	Kent State	Waldo Stadium; Kalamazoo, MI	L 28–45	17,204	
October 22	at Eastern Michigan	Rynearson Stadium; Ypsilanti, MI (rivalry)	W 31–24	23,003	
October 29	Central Michigan	Waldo Stadium; Kalamazoo, MI	W 42–24	32,285	
November 5	at Ball State	Ball State Stadium; Muncie, IN	W 16–13	13,000	
November 12	at Northern Illinois*	Huskie Stadium; DeKalb, IL	L 7–15	2,329	
November 19	Ohio	Waldo Stadium; Kalamazoo, MI	W 23–16	8,250	
December 10	at Fresno State*	Bulldog Stadium; Fresno, CA (California Bowl)	L 30–35	31,272	
*Non-conference game
