= 1988 Hawaii Rainbow Warriors football team =

American college football season

1988 Hawaii Rainbow Warriors football
- Conference: Western Athletic Conference
- Record: 9–3 (5–3 WAC)
- Head coach: Bob Wagner (2nd season)
- Offensive coordinator: Paul Johnson (2nd season)
- Offensive scheme: Triple option
- Defensive coordinator: Rich Ellerson (2nd season)
- Base defense: 4–3
- Home stadium: Aloha Stadium

1988 Western Athletic Conference football standings
	Conf.					Overall
Team	W		L		T	W		L		T
Wyoming $	8	–	0	–	0	11	–	2	–	0
UTEP	6	–	2	–	0	10	–	3	–	0
Hawaii	5	–	3	–	0	9	–	3	–	0
BYU	5	–	3	–	0	9	–	4	–	0
Utah	4	–	4	–	0	6	–	5	–	0
Air Force	3	–	5	–	0	5	–	7	–	0
San Diego State	3	–	5	–	0	3	–	8	–	0
New Mexico	1	–	7	–	0	2	–	10	–	0
Colorado State	1	–	7	–	0	1	–	10	–	0
$ – Conference champion

The 1988 Hawaii Rainbow Warriors football team represented the University of Hawaiʻi at Mānoa in the Western Athletic Conference during the 1988 NCAA Division I-A football season. In their second season under head coach Bob Wagner, the Rainbow Warriors compiled a 9–3 record.

== Schedule ==
Date	Opponent	Site	Result	Attendance	Source
September 3	No. 9 Iowa*	Aloha Stadium; Halawa, HI	W 27–24	46,721	
September 10	at Colorado State	Hughes Stadium; Fort Collins, CO	W 31–23	21,741	
September 17	San Jose State*	Aloha Stadium; Halawa, HI (rivalry)	W 36–27	45,683	
September 24	at Utah	Robert Rice Stadium; Salt Lake City, UT	W 48–20	32,892	
October 8	UTEP	Aloha Stadium; Halawa, HI	L 25–42	50,000	
October 15	at San Diego State	Jack Murphy Stadium; San Diego, CA	W 32–30	27,142	
October 22	BYU	Aloha Stadium; Halawa, HI	L 23–24	50,089	
October 29	Long Beach State*	Aloha Stadium; Halawa, HI	W 34–31	37,498	
November 5	New Mexico^{†}	Aloha Stadium; Halawa, HI	W 45–3	39,953	
November 19	No. 16 Wyoming	Aloha Stadium; Halawa, HI (rivalry)	L 22–28	43,177	
November 26	Air Force	Aloha Stadium; Halawa, HI (rivalry)	W 19–14	43,942	
December 3	Oregon*	Aloha Stadium; Halawa, HI	W 41–19	44,801	
*Non-conference game; ^{†}Homecoming; Rankings from AP Poll released prior to the game

== Game summaries ==
=== #9 Iowa ===
#9 Iowa Hawkeyes (0–1) at Hawaii Rainbow Warriors (1–0) – Game summary

Quarter	1	2	3	4	Total
No. 9 Hawkeyes	7	14	0	3	24
Rainbow Warriors	7	7	0	13	27

at Aloha Stadium • Halawa, HI

- Date: September 3
- Game time: 7:06 p.m. HDT
- Game attendance: 46,721
- Referee: Pat Sweeney

Statistics	IOWA	UH
First downs		
Total yards		
Rushes/yards		
Passing yards		
Passing: Comp–Att–Int		
Time of possession		

Team	Category	Player	Statistics
Iowa	Passing		
Iowa	Rushing		
Iowa	Receiving		
Hawaii	Passing		
Hawaii	Rushing		
Hawaii	Receiving		

Scoring summary

Quarter	Time	Drive			Team	Scoring information	Score	
Quarter	Time	Plays	Yards	TOP	Team	Scoring information	Iowa	Hawaii
"TOP" = time of possession. For other American football terms, see Glossary of American football.							24	27

- 3 hours, 20 minutes

=== at Colorado State ===
Hawaii Rainbow Warriors (2–0) at Colorado State Rams (0–1) – Game summary

Quarter	1	2	3	4	Total
Rainbow Warriors	7	21	3	0	31
Rams	0	17	3	3	23

at Hughes Stadium • Fort Collins, CO

- Date: September 10
- Game time: 10:05 a.m. HDT
- Game attendance: 21,741
- Referee: Gene Wurtz

Statistics	UH	COL ST
First downs		
Total yards		
Rushes/yards		
Passing yards		
Passing: Comp–Att–Int		
Time of possession		

Team	Category	Player	Statistics
Hawaii	Passing		
Hawaii	Rushing		
Hawaii	Receiving		
Colorado State	Passing		
Colorado State	Rushing		
Colorado State	Receiving		

Scoring summary

Quarter	Time	Drive			Team	Scoring information	Score	
Quarter	Time	Plays	Yards	TOP	Team	Scoring information	Hawaii	Colorado State
"TOP" = time of possession. For other American football terms, see Glossary of American football.							31	23

- 3 hours, 15 minutes

=== San Jose State ===
San Jose State Spartans (1–2) at Hawaii Rainbow Warriors (3–0) – Game summary

Quarter	1	2	3	4	Total
Spartans	7	6	0	14	27
Rainbow Warriors	3	0	27	6	36

at Aloha Stadium • Halawa, HI

- Date: September 17
- Game time: 7:05 p.m. HDT
- Game attendance: 41,384
- Referee: Pat Sweeney

Statistics	SJSU	UH
First downs		
Total yards		
Rushes/yards		
Passing yards		
Passing: Comp–Att–Int		
Time of possession		

Team	Category	Player	Statistics
San Jose State	Passing		
San Jose State	Rushing		
San Jose State	Receiving		
Hawaii	Passing		
Hawaii	Rushing		
Hawaii	Receiving		

Scoring summary

Quarter	Time	Drive			Team	Scoring information	Score	
Quarter	Time	Plays	Yards	TOP	Team	Scoring information	San Jose State	Hawaii
"TOP" = time of possession. For other American football terms, see Glossary of American football.							27	36

- 3 hours, 16 minutes

=== at Utah ===
Hawaii Rainbow Warriors (4–0) at Utah Utes (1–2) – Game summary

Quarter	1	2	3	4	Total
Rainbow Warriors	7	10	24	7	48
Utes	7	0	7	6	20

at Rice Stadium • Salt Lake City, UT

- Date: September 24
- Game time: 5:05 p.m. HDT
- Game attendance: 32,892
- Referee: Jack Baker

Statistics	UH	UTAH
First downs		
Total yards		
Rushes/yards		
Passing yards		
Passing: Comp–Att–Int		
Time of possession		

Team	Category	Player	Statistics
Hawaii	Passing		
Hawaii	Rushing		
Hawaii	Receiving		
Utah	Passing		
Utah	Rushing		
Utah	Receiving		

Scoring summary

Quarter	Time	Drive			Team	Scoring information	Score	
Quarter	Time	Plays	Yards	TOP	Team	Scoring information	Hawaii	Utah
"TOP" = time of possession. For other American football terms, see Glossary of American football.							48	20

- 3 hours, 25 minutes

=== UTEP ===
UTEP Miners (5–1) at Hawaii Rainbow Warriors (4–1) – Game summary

Quarter	1	2	3	4	Total
Miners	7	14	7	14	42
Rainbow Warriors	7	10	0	8	25

at Aloha Stadium • Halawa, HI

- Date: October 8
- Game time: 7:05 p.m. HDT
- Game attendance: 46,375
- Referee: Tom Robinson

Statistics	UTEP	UH
First downs		
Total yards		
Rushes/yards		
Passing yards		
Passing: Comp–Att–Int		
Time of possession		

Team	Category	Player	Statistics
UTEP	Passing		
UTEP	Rushing		
UTEP	Receiving		
Hawaii	Passing		
Hawaii	Rushing		
Hawaii	Receiving		

Scoring summary

Quarter	Time	Drive			Team	Scoring information	Score	
Quarter	Time	Plays	Yards	TOP	Team	Scoring information	UTEP	Hawaii
"TOP" = time of possession. For other American football terms, see Glossary of American football.							42	25

- 3 hours, 22 minutes

=== at San Diego State ===
Hawaii Rainbow Warriors (5–1) at San Diego State Aztecs (1–5) – Game summary

Quarter	1	2	3	4	Total
Rainbow Warriors	17	9	3	3	32
Aztecs	7	7	3	13	30

at Jack Murphy Stadium • San Diego, CA

- Date: October 15
- Game time: 5:06 p.m. HDT
- Game attendance: 27,142
- Referee: Guy Gibbs

Statistics	UH	SDSU
First downs		
Total yards		
Rushes/yards		
Passing yards		
Passing: Comp–Att–Int		
Time of possession		

Team	Category	Player	Statistics
Hawaii	Passing		
Hawaii	Rushing		
Hawaii	Receiving		
San Diego State	Passing		
San Diego State	Rushing		
San Diego State	Receiving		

Scoring summary

Quarter	Time	Drive			Team	Scoring information	Score	
Quarter	Time	Plays	Yards	TOP	Team	Scoring information	Hawaii	San Diego State
"TOP" = time of possession. For other American football terms, see Glossary of American football.							32	30

- 3 hours, 18 minutes

=== BYU ===
BYU Cougars (6–1) at Hawaii Rainbow Warriors (5–2) – Game summary

Quarter	1	2	3	4	Total
Cougars	3	14	0	7	24
Rainbow Warriors	6	0	10	7	23

at Aloha Stadium • Halawa, HI

- Date: October 22
- Game time: 6:38 p.m. HDT
- Game attendance: 50,089
- Referee: Gene Wurtz

Statistics	BYU	UH
First downs		
Total yards		
Rushes/yards		
Passing yards		
Passing: Comp–Att–Int		
Time of possession		

Team	Category	Player	Statistics
BYU	Passing		
BYU	Rushing		
BYU	Receiving		
Hawaii	Passing		
Hawaii	Rushing		
Hawaii	Receiving		

Scoring summary

Quarter	Time	Drive			Team	Scoring information	Score	
Quarter	Time	Plays	Yards	TOP	Team	Scoring information	BYU	Hawaii
"TOP" = time of possession. For other American football terms, see Glossary of American football.							24	23

- 3 hours, 15 minutes

=== Long Beach State ===
Long Beach State 49ers (1–7) at Hawaii Rainbow Warriors (6–2) – Game summary

Quarter	1	2	3	4	Total
49ers	6	10	0	15	31
Rainbow Warriors	14	7	6	7	34

- Date: October 29
- Game time: 7:06 p.m. HDT
- Game attendance: 31,371
- Referee: Pat Sweeney

Statistics	LBS	UH
First downs		
Total yards		
Rushes/yards		
Passing yards		
Passing: Comp–Att–Int		
Time of possession		

Team	Category	Player	Statistics
Long Beach State	Passing		
Long Beach State	Rushing		
Long Beach State	Receiving		
Hawaii	Passing		
Hawaii	Rushing		
Hawaii	Receiving		

Scoring summary

Quarter	Time	Drive			Team	Scoring information	Score	
Quarter	Time	Plays	Yards	TOP	Team	Scoring information	Long Beach State	Hawaii
"TOP" = time of possession. For other American football terms, see Glossary of American football.							31	34

- 3 hours, 25 minutes

=== New Mexico ===
New Mexico Lobos (1–8) at Hawaii Rainbow Warriors (7–2) – Game summary

Quarter	1	2	3	4	Total
Lobos	6	0	0	3	9
Rainbow Warriors	10	7	14	14	45

- Date: November 5
- Game time: 7:06 p.m. HST
- Game attendance: 30,536
- Referee: Jack Baker

Statistics	UNM	UH
First downs		
Total yards		
Rushes/yards		
Passing yards		
Passing: Comp–Att–Int		
Time of possession		

Team	Category	Player	Statistics
New Mexico	Passing		
New Mexico	Rushing		
New Mexico	Receiving		
Hawaii	Passing		
Hawaii	Rushing		
Hawaii	Receiving		

Scoring summary

Quarter	Time	Drive			Team	Scoring information	Score	
Quarter	Time	Plays	Yards	TOP	Team	Scoring information	New Mexico	Hawaii
"TOP" = time of possession. For other American football terms, see Glossary of American football.							3	45

- 2 hours, 56 minutes

=== #16 Wyoming ===
#16 Wyoming Cowboys (11–1) at Hawaii Rainbow Warriors (7–3) – Game summary

Quarter	1	2	3	4	Total
Cowboys	3	17	8	0	28
Rainbow Warriors	0	7	7	8	22

- Date: November 19
- Game time: 7:06 p.m. HST
- Game attendance: 43,177
- Referee: Jack Baker

Statistics	WYO	UH
First downs		
Total yards		
Rushes/yards		
Passing yards		
Passing: Comp–Att–Int		
Time of possession		

Team	Category	Player	Statistics
Wyoming	Passing		
Wyoming	Rushing		
Wyoming	Receiving		
Hawaii	Passing		
Hawaii	Rushing		
Hawaii	Receiving		

Scoring summary

Quarter	Time	Drive			Team	Scoring information	Score	
Quarter	Time	Plays	Yards	TOP	Team	Scoring information	Wyoming	Hawaii
"TOP" = time of possession. For other American football terms, see Glossary of American football.							28	22

- 3 hours, 14 minutes

=== Air Force ===
Air Force Falcons (5–7) at Hawaii Rainbow Warriors (8–3) – Game summary

Quarter	1	2	3	4	Total
Falcons	7	7	0	7	21
Rainbow Warriors	7	6	0	6	19

- Date: November 26
- Game time: 7:06 p.m. HST
- Game attendance: 43,942

Statistics	AF	UH
First downs		
Total yards		
Rushes/yards		
Passing yards		
Passing: Comp–Att–Int		
Time of possession		

Team	Category	Player	Statistics
Air Force	Passing		
Air Force	Rushing		
Air Force	Receiving		
Hawaii	Passing		
Hawaii	Rushing		
Hawaii	Receiving		

Scoring summary

Quarter	Time	Drive			Team	Scoring information	Score	
Quarter	Time	Plays	Yards	TOP	Team	Scoring information	Air Force	Hawaii
"TOP" = time of possession. For other American football terms, see Glossary of American football.							14	19

- 2 hours, 56 minutes

=== Oregon ===
Oregon Ducks (6–6) at Hawaii Rainbow Warriors (9–4) – Game summary

Quarter	1	2	3	4	Total
Ducks	3	3	3	8	17
Rainbow Warriors	3	3	14	21	41

- Date: December 3
- Game time: 7:10 p.m. HST
- Game attendance: 39,301
- Referee: Guy Gibbs

Statistics	ORE	UH
First downs		
Total yards		
Rushes/yards		
Passing yards		
Passing: Comp–Att–Int		
Time of possession		

Team	Category	Player	Statistics
Oregon	Passing		
Oregon	Rushing		
Oregon	Receiving		
Hawaii	Passing		
Hawaii	Rushing		
Hawaii	Receiving		

Scoring summary

Quarter	Time	Drive			Team	Scoring information	Score	
Quarter	Time	Plays	Yards	TOP	Team	Scoring information	Oregon	Hawaii
"TOP" = time of possession. For other American football terms, see Glossary of American football.							17	41

- 3 hours, 1 minute
