= 1988 New Mexico Lobos football team =

American college football season

1988 New Mexico Lobos football
- Conference: Western Athletic Conference
- Record: 2–10 (1–7 WAC)
- Head coach: Mike Sheppard (2nd season)
- Defensive coordinator: Jack Stanton (1st season)
- Home stadium: University Stadium

1988 Western Athletic Conference football standings
	Conf.					Overall
Team	W		L		T	W		L		T
Wyoming $	8	–	0	–	0	11	–	2	–	0
UTEP	6	–	2	–	0	10	–	3	–	0
Hawaii	5	–	3	–	0	9	–	3	–	0
BYU	5	–	3	–	0	9	–	4	–	0
Utah	4	–	4	–	0	6	–	5	–	0
Air Force	3	–	5	–	0	5	–	7	–	0
San Diego State	3	–	5	–	0	3	–	8	–	0
New Mexico	1	–	7	–	0	2	–	10	–	0
Colorado State	1	–	7	–	0	1	–	10	–	0
$ – Conference champion

The 1988 New Mexico Lobos football team was an American football team that represented the University of New Mexico in the Western Athletic Conference (WAC) during the 1988 NCAA Division I-A football season. In their second season under head coach Mike Sheppard, the Lobos compiled a 2–10 record (1–7 against WAC opponents) and were outscored by a total of 518 to 170.

The team's statistical leaders included Jeremy Leach with 1,986 passing yards, Andre Wooten with 801 rushing yards, Al Owens with 774 receiving yards, and kicker Rick Walsh with 46 points scored.

In its third season of broadcasting both live and delayed games, KGSW-TV 14 (now KLUZ-TV) would only leave one road contest against Hawaii off its schedule. As with the past two seasons, the road games were seen live, while the home games were show on delay at 10pm (MST).

== Schedule ==
Date	Opponent	Site	Result	Attendance	Source
September 3	Fresno State*	University Stadium; Albuquerque, NM	L 21–68	18,061	
September 10	at New Mexico State*	Aggie Memorial Stadium; Las Cruces, NM (rivalry)	W 36–34	21,157	
September 17	at Texas*	Texas Memorial Stadium; Austin, TX	L 0–47	55,630	
September 24	Akron*	University Stadium; Albuquerque, NM	L 28–30	11,740	
October 1	at Air Force	Falcon Stadium; Colorado Springs, CO	L 14–63	38,615	
October 8	Utah^{†}	University Stadium; Albuquerque, NM	L 27–33	10,960	
October 15	at No. 14 Wyoming	War Memorial Stadium; Laramie, WY	L 7–55	20,363	
October 22	UTEP	University Stadium; Albuquerque, NM	L 0–37	11,441	
October 29	at BYU	Cougar Stadium; Provo, UT	L 0–65	63,424	
November 5	at Hawaii	Aloha Stadium; Halawa, HI	L 3–45	39,953	
November 12	Colorado State	University Stadium; Albuquerque, NM	W 24–23	8,180	
November 19	San Diego State	University Stadium; Albuquerque, NM	L 10–18	7,923	
*Non-conference game; ^{†}Homecoming; Rankings from AP Poll released prior to the game
