= Dee Dowis =

American football player (1968–2016)

No. 6
- Position: Quarterback

Personal information
- Born: August 2, 1968; Royston, Georgia, U.S.
- Died: August 29, 2016 (aged 48); Gwinnett County, Georgia, U.S.
- Listed height: 5 ft 10 in (1.78 m)
- Listed weight: 153 lb (69 kg)

Career information
- High school: Franklin County (GA)
- College: Air Force (1986–1990)

Awards and highlights
- WAC Offensive Player of the Year (1989); First-team All-WAC (1989); 2× Second-team All-WAC (1987, 1988)

Michael "Dee" Dowis (August 2, 1968 – August 29, 2016) was an American college football player who was a quarterback for the Air Force Falcons. He graduated as the NCAA's all-time leading rusher for a quarterback.

== Early life ==
Dowis was born and grew up in Royston, Georgia. His father, Leonard Dowis, was the Franklin County High School football coach. He died of a heart attack when Dee was four years old.

Dowis attended Franklin County High School, where he practiced multiple-sports. In football, he was a starter at quarterback in a wishbone offense and led the team to the Georgia football playoffs.

He received All-state honors at shortstop in baseball. He wasn't a highly recruited athlete because of his size.

== College career ==
Dowis was accepted into the United States Air Force Academy. As a freshman with the Falcons in 1986, he was the third string quarterback behind James Tomallo and Troy Calhoun. He tallied 24 carries for 39 yards, one rushing touchdown, 10 of 29 attempts for 115 yards and one passing touchdown. He felt homesick and almost transferred after the season.

As a sophomore in 1987, he began the season as the backup quarterback behind Steve Letnich, but when the Falcons fell behind, 20–0, in the season opener loss (27–13) against the University of Wyoming, he replaced Letnich and never looked back. He had 18 carries for 188 yards in the 49–7 win against San Diego State University. He broke his right wrist in the season finale win (34–31) against the University of Hawaii. The injury forced him to miss the team's 33–28 loss against Arizona State University in the 1987 Freedom Bowl. He set an NCAA single-season rushing mark for quarterbacks with 1,315 yards that stood for 12 years. He finished the season with 194 carries for 1,315 yards (6.8 yard avg.), 10 rushing touchdowns, 45 of 112 attempts for 600 yards, 4 passing touchdowns and 8 interceptions.

As a junior in 1988, he had 153 carries for 972 yards (6.4 yard avg.), 12 rushing touchdowns, 41 of 96 attempts for 870 yards and 7 passing touchdowns. He also tied an NCAA record after completing 11 consecutive passes against Northwestern University.

As a senior in 1989, he became the fifth player in NCAA history to run and pass for more than 1,000 yards in a single-season. He ran for 1,286 yards with 18 touchdowns and passed for 1,285 yards with 7 scores. He also set the NCAA Division I career record for rushing yards by a quarterback with 3,612 (broken by Antwaan Randle El in 2001). Against San Diego State University, he set the Western Athletic Conference record for most rushing yards by a quarterback in a single-game with 249 (broken by Chad Hall on October 13, 2007) and most rushing touchdowns by a quarterback in a single-game with 6.

Dowis is regarded as one of the best option quarterbacks in NCAA history. He finished sixth in the Heisman Trophy voting in 1989.

=== Statistics ===
College statistics
Year	Team	Games			Passing								Rushing			
Year	Team	GP	GS	Record	Cmp	Att	Pct	Yds	Avg	TD	Int	Rtg	Att	Yds	Avg	TD
1986	Air Force	11	0	0−0	10	29	34.5	115	4.0	1	2	65.4	24	39	1.6	1
1987	Air Force	12	11	9−2	45	112	40.2	600	5.4	4	8	82.7	194	1,315	6.8	10
1988	Air Force	12	12	5−7	41	96	42.7	870	9.1	7	3	136.6	153	972	6.4	12
1989	Air Force	12	12	7−4−1	67	140	47.9	1,285	9.2	7	4	135.7	172	1,286	7.5	18
Career		47	35	21−13−1	163	377	43.2	2,870	7.6	19	17	114.8	543	3,612	6.7	41

== Personal life ==
Dowis received an MBA from the University of West Florida in 1993. He served as a football coach on the Air Force staff in 1995.

On July 17, 1998, he was inducted into the Franklin County Sports Hall of Fame as a charter member. In 2009, he was inducted into the Air Force Academy Athletics Hall of Fame. In 2011, he was inducted into the Colorado Springs Sports Hall of Fame. He was also inducted into the North Georgia Sports Hall of Fame.

He lived in Greenville, South Carolina, near Royston, Georgia, where he was born and raised. He worked as a manager for Pfizer pharmaceuticals, and was married with two children.

On August 29, 2016, he died in a traffic accident at the age of 48 after driving south in the northbound freeway lane, not wearing a seatbelt. Forensic toxicology reports confirmed that he had a blood alcohol content level of .21 at the time of the accident.
