= 1988 Pacific Tigers football team =

American college football season

1988 Pacific Tigers football
- Conference: Big West Conference
- Record: 2–9 (2–5 Big West)
- Head coach: Bob Cope (6th season)
- Home stadium: Stagg Memorial Stadium

1988 Big West Conference football standings
	Conf.					Overall
Team	W		L		T	W		L		T
Fresno State $	7	–	0	–	0	10	–	2	–	0
Cal State Fullerton	5	–	2	–	0	5	–	6	–	0
Utah State	4	–	3	–	0	4	–	7	–	0
San Jose State	4	–	3	–	0	4	–	8	–	0
UNLV	3	–	4	–	0	4	–	7	–	0
Long Beach State	3	–	4	–	0	3	–	9	–	0
Pacific (CA)	2	–	5	–	0	2	–	9	–	0
New Mexico State	0	–	7	–	0	1	–	10	–	0
$ – Conference champion

The 1988 Pacific Tigers football team represented the University of the Pacific (UOP) in the 1988 NCAA Division I-A football season as a member of the Big West Conference. (Note: The Big West Conference had previously been known as the "Pacific Coast Athletic Association" (PCAA) from its founding in 1969 through 1987.)

The team was led by sixth-year head coach Bob Cope and played home games on campus at Stagg Memorial Stadium in Stockton, California. The stadium was renamed at homecoming on October 15. (Note: Amos Alonzo Stagg Memorial Stadium had been known as Pacific Memorial Stadium from its opening in 1950 until the rededication at homecoming on October 15.) The Tigers finished with two wins and nine losses (2–9, 2–5 Big West), and were outscored 174–324.

== Schedule ==
Date	Opponent	Site	Result	Attendance	Source
September 3	at Arkansas*	War Memorial Stadium; Little Rock, AR	L 14–63	49,600	
September 10	at California*	California Memorial Stadium; Berkeley, CA	L 7–30	39,000	
September 17	No. 9 (Div. I-AA) Idaho*	Pacific Memorial Stadium; Stockton, CA	L 26–36	13,868	
September 24	Cal State Fullerton	Santa Ana Stadium; Santa Ana, CA	L 10–13	2,924	
October 1	at Long Beach State	Veterans Stadium; Long Beach, CA	W 22–10	2,919	
October 8	UNLV	Pacific Memorial Stadium; Stockton, CA	L 16–30	6,233	
October 15	San Jose State^{†}	Stagg Memorial Stadium; Stockton, CA (Victory Bell)	L 17–35	9,732	
October 22	No. 11 (Div. II) Sacramento State*	Stagg Memorial Stadium; Stockton, CA	L 21–30	5,147	
October 29	at Utah State	Romney Stadium; Logan, UT	L 20–23	13,147	
November 5	at Fresno State	Bulldog Stadium; Fresno, CA	L 0–34	34,436	
November 19	New Mexico State	Stagg Memorial Stadium; Stockton, CA	W 21–20	900	
*Non-conference game; ^{†}Homecoming; Rankings from NCAA Division I-AA Football Committee Poll released prior to the game
