= 1988 UTEP Miners football team =

American college football season

1988 UTEP Miners football

Independence Bowl, L 18–38 vs. Southern Miss
- Conference: Western Athletic Conference
- Record: 10–3 (6–2 WAC)
- Head coach: Bob Stull (3rd season)
- Offensive coordinator: Dirk Koetter (3rd season)
- Home stadium: Sun Bowl

1988 Western Athletic Conference football standings
	Conf.					Overall
Team	W		L		T	W		L		T
Wyoming $	8	–	0	–	0	11	–	2	–	0
UTEP	6	–	2	–	0	10	–	3	–	0
Hawaii	5	–	3	–	0	9	–	3	–	0
BYU	5	–	3	–	0	9	–	4	–	0
Utah	4	–	4	–	0	6	–	5	–	0
Air Force	3	–	5	–	0	5	–	7	–	0
San Diego State	3	–	5	–	0	3	–	8	–	0
New Mexico	1	–	7	–	0	2	–	10	–	0
Colorado State	1	–	7	–	0	1	–	10	–	0
$ – Conference champion

The 1988 UTEP Miners football team was an American football team that represented the University of Texas at El Paso as a member of the Western Athletic Conference (WAC) during the 1988 NCAA Division I-A football season. In its third season under head coach Bob Stull, the team compiled a 10–3 record (6–2 against WAC opponents), finished second in the conference, lost to Southern Miss in the 1988 Independence Bowl, and outscored all opponents by a total of 445 to 275.

== Schedule ==
Date	Opponent	Site	Result	Attendance	Source
September 3	Mankato State*	Sun Bowl; El Paso, TX	W 37–3	32,148	
September 10	Weber State*	Sun Bowl; El Paso, TX	W 48–21	30,790	
September 17	at BYU	Cougar Stadium; Provo, UT	L 27–31	64,099	
September 24	at Tulsa*	Skelly Field; Tulsa, OK	W 27–24	20,057	
October 1	Utah	Sun Bowl; El Paso, TX	W 38–28	40,578	
October 8	at Hawaii	Aloha Stadium; Halawa, HI	W 42–25	50,000	
October 15	Colorado State^{†}	Sun Bowl; El Paso, TX	W 34–14	45,187	
October 22	at New Mexico	University Stadium; Albuquerque, NM	W 37–0	11,441	
October 29	at New Mexico State*	Aggie Memorial Stadium; Las Cruces, NM	W 42–9	30,061	
November 5	at No. 10 Wyoming	War Memorial Stadium; Laramie, WY	L 6–51	32,210	
November 12	San Diego State	Sun Bowl; El Paso, TX	W 58–7	31,552	
November 19	Air Force	Sun Bowl; El Paso, TX	W 31–24	35,595	
December 23	vs. Southern Miss*	Independence Stadium; Shreveport, LA (Independence Bowl)	L 18–38	20,242	
*Non-conference game; ^{†}Homecoming; Rankings from AP Poll released prior to the game
