= 1988 Air Force Falcons football team =

American college football season

1988 Air Force Falcons football
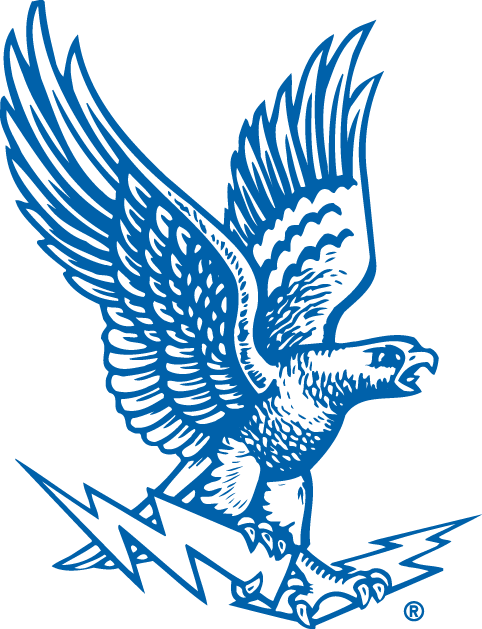
- Conference: Western Athletic Conference
- Record: 5–7 (3–5 WAC)
- Head coach: Fisher DeBerry (5th season)
- Offensive scheme: Wishbone triple option
- Captain: All seniors
- Home stadium: Falcon Stadium

1988 Western Athletic Conference football standings
	Conf.					Overall
Team	W		L		T	W		L		T
Wyoming $	8	–	0	–	0	11	–	2	–	0
UTEP	6	–	2	–	0	10	–	3	–	0
Hawaii	5	–	3	–	0	9	–	3	–	0
BYU	5	–	3	–	0	9	–	4	–	0
Utah	4	–	4	–	0	6	–	5	–	0
Air Force	3	–	5	–	0	5	–	7	–	0
San Diego State	3	–	5	–	0	3	–	8	–	0
New Mexico	1	–	7	–	0	2	–	10	–	0
Colorado State	1	–	7	–	0	1	–	10	–	0
$ – Conference champion

The 1988 Air Force Falcons football team represented the United States Air Force Academy in the 1988 NCAA Division I-A football season as a member of the Western Athletic Conference (WAC). The Falcons were coached by Fisher DeBerry and played their home games at Falcon Stadium.

== Schedule ==
Date	Opponent	Site	Result	Attendance	Source
September 3	at Colorado State	Hughes Stadium; Fort Collins, CO (rivalry)	W 29–23	25,471	
September 11	at San Diego State	Jack Murphy Stadium; San Diego, CA	L 36–39	20,112	
September 17	Northwestern*	Falcon Stadium; Colorado Springs, CO	W 62–27	42,612	
September 24	Wyoming	Falcon Stadium; Colorado Springs, CO	L 45–48	44,028	
October 1	New Mexico	Falcon Stadium; Colorado Springs, CO	W 63–14	38,615	
October 8	Navy*	Falcon Stadium; Colorado Springs, CO (Commander-in-Chief's Trophy)	W 33–24	50,570	
October 15	at Utah	Robert Rice Stadium; Salt Lake City, UT	W 56–49	25,331	
October 22	at No. 2 Notre Dame*	Notre Dame Stadium; Notre Dame, IN (rivalry)	L 13–41	59,075	
November 5	at Army*	Michie Stadium; West Point, NY (Commander-in-Chief's Trophy)	L 15–28	40,660	
November 12	BYU	Falcon Stadium; Colorado Springs, CO	L 31–49	40,218	
November 19	at UTEP	Sun Bowl; El Paso, TX	L 24–31	35,595	
November 26	at Hawaii	Aloha Stadium; Halawa, HI (rivalry)	L 14–19	43,942	
*Non-conference game; Rankings from AP Poll released prior to the game

== Game summaries ==
=== BYU ===
BYU Cougars (7–2) at Air Force Falcons (5–4)

Quarter	1	2	3	4	Total
BYU	7	14	14	14	49
Air Force	10	7	14	0	31

at Falcon Stadium, Colorado Springs, Colorado

- Date: November 12, 1988
- Game weather: 44 °F (7 °C)
- Game attendance: 40,218
- Box Score

Game information

First quarter

- AFA – Steve Yarborough 44-yard field goal. Air Force 3–0.
- AFA – Greg Johnson 3-yard run (Steve Yarborough kick). Air Force 10–0.
- BYU – Fred Whittingham 3-yard run (Jason Chaffetz kick). Air Force 10–7.

Second quarter

- BYU – Sean Covey 1-yard run (Jason Chaffetz kick). BYU 14–10.
- AFA – Dee Dowis 4-yard run (Steve Yarborough kick). Air Force 17–14.
- BYU – Tyler Anderson 41-yard pass from Sean Covey (Jason Chaffetz kick). BYU 21–17.

Third quarter

- BYU – Matt Bellini 21-yard run (Jason Chaffetz kick). BYU 28–17.
- AFA – Dee Dowis 6-yard run (run failed). BYU 28–23.
- AFA – Dee Dowis 15-yard run (run good). Air Force 31–28.
- BYU – Tony Crutchfield 79-yard kickoff return. BYU 35–31.

Fourth quarter

- BYU – Sean Covey 2-yard run (Jason Chaffetz kick). BYU 42–31.
- BYU – Mike Salido 5-yard run (Jason Chaffetz kick). BYU 49–31.

Top passers

- BYU – Sean Covey – 10/16, 159 yards, TD
- AFA – Dee Dowis – 3/8, 97 yards, 2 INT

Top rushers

- BYU – Matt Bellini – 21 rushes, 138 yards, TD
- AFA – Greg Johnson – 15 rushes, 112 yards, TD

Top receivers

- BYU – Mike Salido – 4 receptions, 47 yards
- AFA – Albert Booker – 2 receptions, 58 yards

== Roster ==
1988 Air Force Falcons football team roster
Players
Coaches
Offense

Pos.	#	Name	Class
OL		Kevin Bell
RB		Albert Booker
QB		Troy Calhoun	Sr
WR		Greg Cochran
WR		Mark Crossman
QB		Dee Dowis	Jr
RB		Ron Gray
OL		David Hlatky
OL		Scott Hollister
RB		Chris Howard
RB		Greg Johnson
OL		Jeff Johnson
RB		Tim Kosmatka
RB		Rodney Lewis
QB		Lance McDowell
OL		Jim Payne
RB		Anthony Roberson
WR		Steven Senn
RB		Andy Smith
RB		Ken Spencer
WR		Mark Weber

Defense

Pos.	#	Name	Class
DL		Kenny Gibaldo
LB		Randle Gladney
DB		James Hecker
LB		Brian Hill
DL		Tom Kafka
DB		Gary Kilmer
LB		Mark Lyons
DB		Mario Mathis
DL		Pat McNelis
LB		Joe Powell
DL		Darryl Sumrall
DB		Andy Toth
LB		Terry Walker

Special teams

Pos.	#	Name	Class
P		Chris Blasy
K		Steve Yarborough

Head coach

- Fisher DeBerry

Coordinators/assistant coaches

Legend

- (C) Team captain
- (S) Suspended
- (I) Ineligible
- Injured
- Redshirt
