= 1988 Miami Redskins football team =

American college football season

1988 Miami Redskins football
- Conference: Mid-American Conference
- Record: 0–10–1 (0–7–1 MAC)
- Head coach: Tim Rose (6th season)
- Home stadium: Yager Stadium

1988 Mid-American Conference football standings
| | Conf. | | | | | Overall |
| Team | W | | L | | T | W | | L | | T |
|---|---|---|---|---|---|---|---|---|---|---|
| Western Michigan $ | 7 | – | 1 | – | 0 | 9 | – | 3 | – | 0 |
| Eastern Michigan | 5 | – | 2 | – | 1 | 6 | – | 3 | – | 1 |
| Ball State | 5 | – | 3 | – | 0 | 8 | – | 3 | – | 0 |
| Central Michigan | 5 | – | 3 | – | 0 | 7 | – | 4 | – | 0 |
| Ohio | 4 | – | 3 | – | 1 | 4 | – | 6 | – | 1 |
| Toledo | 4 | – | 4 | – | 0 | 6 | – | 5 | – | 0 |
| Kent State | 3 | – | 5 | – | 0 | 5 | – | 6 | – | 0 |
| Bowling Green | 1 | – | 6 | – | 1 | 2 | – | 8 | – | 1 |
| Miami (OH) | 0 | – | 7 | – | 1 | 0 | – | 10 | – | 1 |
$ – Conference champion

The 1988 Miami Redskins football team was an American football team that represented Miami University in the Mid-American Conference (MAC) during the 1988 NCAA Division I-A football season. In its sixth season under head coach Tim Rose, the team compiled a 0–10–1 record (0–7–1 against MAC opponents), finished in ninth and last place in the MAC, and were outscored by all opponents by a combined total of 361 to 167.

== Schedule ==
| Date | Opponent | Site | Result | Attendance | Source |
|---|---|---|---|---|---|
| September 3 | at Eastern Michigan | Rynearson Stadium; Ypsilanti, MI | L 17–24 | 17,062 | |
| September 10 | at Oklahoma State* | Lewis Field; Stillwater, OK | L 20–52 | 43,200 | |
| September 17 | at Minnesota* | Metrodome; Minneapolis, MN | L 3–35 | 39,343 | |
| September 24 | Cincinnati* | Yager Stadium; Oxford, OH (rivalry) | L 18–34 | 26,039 | |
| October 1 | at Ball State | Ball State Stadium; Muncie, IN | L 14–45 | 11,450 | |
| October 8 | Western Michigan | Yager Stadium; Oxford, OH (Homecoming) | L 18–41 | 17,916 | |
| October 15 | at Ohio | Peden Stadium; Athens, OH (rivalry) | L 21–38 | 18,240 | |
| October 22 | Toledo | Yager Stadium; Oxford, OH | L 7–20 | 14,927 | |
| October 29 | at Bowling Green | Doyt Perry Stadium; Bowling Green, OH | T 21–21 | 18,510 | |
| November 12 | Kent State | Yager Stadium; Oxford, OH | L 11–17 | 19,455 | |
| November 19 | Central Michigan | Yager Stadium; Oxford, OH | L 17–34 | 5,876 | |
*Non-conference game

Table Source:
