= 1988 Central Michigan Chippewas football team =

American college football season

1988 Central Michigan Chippewas football
- Conference: Mid-American Conference
- Record: 7–4 (5–3 MAC)
- Head coach: Herb Deromedi (11th season)
- MVP: George Ricumstrict
- Home stadium: Kelly/Shorts Stadium

1988 Mid-American Conference football standings
	Conf.					Overall
Team	W		L		T	W		L		T
Western Michigan $	7	–	1	–	0	9	–	3	–	0
Eastern Michigan	5	–	2	–	1	6	–	3	–	1
Ball State	5	–	3	–	0	8	–	3	–	0
Central Michigan	5	–	3	–	0	7	–	4	–	0
Ohio	4	–	3	–	1	4	–	6	–	1
Toledo	4	–	4	–	0	6	–	5	–	0
Kent State	3	–	5	–	0	5	–	6	–	0
Bowling Green	1	–	6	–	1	2	–	8	–	1
Miami (OH)	0	–	7	–	1	0	–	10	–	1
$ – Conference champion

The 1988 Central Michigan Chippewas football team represented Central Michigan University in the Mid-American Conference (MAC) during the 1988 NCAA Division I-A football season. In their 11th season under head coach Herb Deromedi, the Chippewas compiled a 7–4 record (5–3 against MAC opponents), finished in a tie for third place in the MAC standings, and outscored their opponents, 287 to 176. The team played its home games in Kelly/Shorts Stadium in Mount Pleasant, Michigan, with attendance of 86,177 in five home games.

The team's statistical leaders included quarterback Jeff Bender with 1,309 passing yards, tailback Donnie Riley with 1,128 rushing yards, and Mark Hopkins with 433 receiving yards. Bender received the MAC's Freshman of the Year award, and linebacker George Ricumstrict received the team's most valuable player award. Four Central Michigan players (offensive guard Chuck Pellegrini, tailback Donnie Riley, linebacker Mark Dennis, and defensive lineman Scott Alferink) received first-team All-MAC honors.

== Schedule ==
Date	Opponent	Site	Result	Attendance	Source
September 3	at Kentucky*	Commonwealth Stadium; Lexington, KY	L 7–18	41,736	
September 17	at Akron*	Rubber Bowl; Akron, OH	W 27–16	19,124	
September 24	Montana State*	Kelly/Shorts Stadium; Mount Pleasant, MI	W 48–10	18,516	
October 1	Kent State	Kelly/Shorts Stadium; Mount Pleasant, MI	W 31–7		
October 8	at Eastern Michigan	Rynearson Stadium; Ypsilanti, MI (rivalry)	W 20–6	22,136	
October 15	Bowling Green	Kelly/Shorts Stadium; Mount Pleasant, MI	W 21–3	22,685	
October 22	Ball State	Kelly/Shorts Stadium; Mount Pleasant, MI	L 20–27	15,612	
October 29	at Western Michigan	Waldo Stadium; Kalamazoo, MI (rivalry)	L 24–42	32,285	
November 5	Ohio	Kelly/Shorts Stadium; Mount Pleasant, MI	W 42–10		
November 12	at Toledo	Glass Bowl; Toledo, OH	L 13–20		
November 19	at Miami (OH)	Yager Stadium; Oxford, OH	W 34–17	5,976	
*Non-conference game
