= 1988 Bowling Green Falcons football team =

American college football season

1988 Bowling Green Falcons football
- Conference: Mid-American Conference
- Record: 2–8–1 (1–6–1 MAC)
- Head coach: Moe Ankney (3rd season)
- Defensive coordinator: Bob Wolfe (3rd season)
- Home stadium: Doyt Perry Stadium

1988 Mid-American Conference football standings
	Conf.					Overall
Team	W		L		T	W		L		T
Western Michigan $	7	–	1	–	0	9	–	3	–	0
Eastern Michigan	5	–	2	–	1	6	–	3	–	1
Ball State	5	–	3	–	0	8	–	3	–	0
Central Michigan	5	–	3	–	0	7	–	4	–	0
Ohio	4	–	3	–	1	4	–	6	–	1
Toledo	4	–	4	–	0	6	–	5	–	0
Kent State	3	–	5	–	0	5	–	6	–	0
Bowling Green	1	–	6	–	1	2	–	8	–	1
Miami (OH)	0	–	7	–	1	0	–	10	–	1
$ – Conference champion

The 1988 Bowling Green Falcons football team was an American football team that represented Bowling Green University in the Mid-American Conference (MAC) during the 1988 NCAA Division I-A football season. In their third season under head coach Moe Ankney, the Falcons compiled a 2–8–1 record (1–6–1 against MAC opponents), finished in eighth place in the MAC, and were outscored by all opponents by a combined total of 333 to 159.

The team's statistical leaders included Eric Smith with 1,306 passing yards, Mike McGee with 504 rushing yards, and Ronald Heard with 622 receiving yards.

== Schedule ==
Date	Opponent	Site	Result	Attendance	Source
September 3	at No. 16 West Virginia*	Mountaineer Field; Morgantown, WV	L 14–62	53,515	
September 10	Ball State	Doyt Perry Stadium; Bowling Green, OH	L 10–34		
September 17	at TCU*	Amon G. Carter Stadium; Fort Worth, TX	L 12–49	18,706	
September 24	at Toledo	Glass Bowl; Toledo, OH (rivalry)	L 5–34		
October 1	at Western Michigan	Waldo Stadium; Kalamazoo, MI	L 10–37	23,758	
October 8	Ohio	Doyt Perry Stadium; Bowling Green, OH	W 42–0		
October 15	at Central Michigan	Kelly/Shorts Stadium; Mount Pleasant, MI	L 3–21	22,685	
October 22	Youngstown State*	Doyt Perry Stadium; Bowling Green, OH	W 20–16	7,010	
October 29	Miami (OH)	Doyt Perry Stadium; Bowling Green, OH	T 21–21	18,510	
November 5	at Kent State	Dix Stadium; Kent, OH (Anniversary Award)	L 19–31	5,300	
November 12	Eastern Michigan	Doyt Perry Stadium; Bowling Green, OH	L 3–28		
*Non-conference game; Rankings from AP Poll released prior to the game
