= 1988 Ball State Cardinals football team =

American college football season

1988 Ball State Cardinals football
- Conference: Mid-American Conference
- Record: 8–3 (5–3 MAC)
- Head coach: Paul Schudel (4th season)
- Offensive coordinator: Greg Meyer (2nd season)
- Home stadium: Ball State Stadium

1988 Mid-American Conference football standings
	Conf.					Overall
Team	W		L		T	W		L		T
Western Michigan $	7	–	1	–	0	9	–	3	–	0
Eastern Michigan	5	–	2	–	1	6	–	3	–	1
Ball State	5	–	3	–	0	8	–	3	–	0
Central Michigan	5	–	3	–	0	7	–	4	–	0
Ohio	4	–	3	–	1	4	–	6	–	1
Toledo	4	–	4	–	0	6	–	5	–	0
Kent State	3	–	5	–	0	5	–	6	–	0
Bowling Green	1	–	6	–	1	2	–	8	–	1
Miami (OH)	0	–	7	–	1	0	–	10	–	1
$ – Conference champion

The 1988 Ball State Cardinals football team was an American football team that represented Ball State University in the Mid-American Conference (MAC) during the 1988 NCAA Division I-A football season. In its fourth season under head coach Paul Schudel, the team compiled an 8–3 record (5–3 against conference opponents) and tied for third place in the MAC. The team played its home games at Ball State Stadium in Muncie, Indiana.

The team's statistical leaders included David Riley with 1,886 passing yards, Mark Stevens with 774 rushing yards, Eugene Riley with 457 receiving yards, and Kenny Stucker with 84 points scored.

== Schedule ==
Date	Opponent	Site	Result	Attendance	Source
September 3	Toledo	Ball State Stadium; Muncie, IN	W 13–3	9,130	
September 10	at Bowling Green	Doyt Perry Stadium; Bowling Green, OH	W 34–10		
September 17	UMass*	Ball State Stadium; Muncie, IN	W 44–17	9,370	
October 1	Miami (OH)	Ball State Stadium; Muncie, IN	W 45–14	11,450	
October 8	at Kent State	Dix Stadium; Kent, OH	W 31–20	17,500	
October 15	Eastern Michigan	Ball State Stadium; Muncie, IN	L 12–16	16,125	
October 22	at Central Michigan	Kelly/Shorts Stadium; Mount Pleasant, MI	W 27–20	15,612	
October 29	at Northern Illinois*	Huskie Stadium; DeKalb, IL (rivalry)	W 18–17	15,049	
November 5	Western Michigan	Ball State Stadium; Muncie, IN	L 13–16	13,000	
November 12	at Ohio	Peden Stadium; Athens, OH	L 25–27	7,238	
November 17	vs. Indiana State*	Hoosier Dome; Indianapolis, IN (Blue Key Victory Bell)	W 24–10	8,140	
*Non-conference game
