= 1988 Eastern Michigan Hurons football team =

American college football season

1988 Eastern Michigan Hurons football
- Conference: Mid-American Conference
- Record: 6–3–1 (5–2–1 MAC)
- Head coach: Jim Harkema (6th season)
- Captain: Game captains
- Home stadium: Rynearson Stadium

1988 Mid-American Conference football standings
	Conf.					Overall
Team	W		L		T	W		L		T
Western Michigan $	7	–	1	–	0	9	–	3	–	0
Eastern Michigan	5	–	2	–	1	6	–	3	–	1
Ball State	5	–	3	–	0	8	–	3	–	0
Central Michigan	5	–	3	–	0	7	–	4	–	0
Ohio	4	–	3	–	1	4	–	6	–	1
Toledo	4	–	4	–	0	6	–	5	–	0
Kent State	3	–	5	–	0	5	–	6	–	0
Bowling Green	1	–	6	–	1	2	–	8	–	1
Miami (OH)	0	–	7	–	1	0	–	10	–	1
$ – Conference champion

The 1988 Eastern Michigan Hurons football team represented Eastern Michigan University in the 1988 NCAA Division I-A football season. In their sixth season under head coach Jim Harkema, the Hurons compiled a 6–3–1 record (5–2–1 against conference opponents), finished in second place in the Mid-American Conference, and outscored their opponents, 200 to 173. The team lost to Arizona by a 55-0 score. The team's statistical leaders included Tom Sullivan with 1,664 passing yards, Bob Foster with 762 rushing yards, and Craig Ostrander with 676 receiving yards.

== Schedule ==
Date	Opponent	Site	Result	Attendance	Source
September 3	Miami (OH)	Rynearson Stadium; Ypsilanti, MI	W 24–17	17,062	
September 10	at Youngstown State*	Stambaugh Stadium; Youngstown, OH	W 17–12	7,841	
September 17	Kent State	Rynearson Stadium; Ypsilanti, MI	W 21–14	16,478	
September 24	at Arizona*	Arizona Stadium; Tucson, AZ	L 0–55	43,035	
October 8	Central Michigan	Rynearson Stadium; Ypsilanti, MI (rivalry)	L 6–20	22,136	
October 15	at Ball State	Ball State Stadium; Muncie, IN	W 16–12	16,125	
October 22	Western Michigan	Rynearson Stadium; Ypsilanti, MI	L 24–31	23,003	
October 29	at Ohio	Peden Stadium; Athens, OH	T 17–17		
November 5	Toledo	Rynearson Stadium; Ypsilanti, MI	W 20–19	8,338	
November 12	at Bowling Green	Doyt Perry Stadium; Bowling Green, OH	W 28–3		
*Non-conference game
