= 1988 Independence Bowl =

UTEP Miners	Southern Miss Golden Eagles
(10–2)	(9–2)
WAC	Independent
18	38
Head coach: Bob Stull	Head coach: Curley Hallman
	1	2	3	4	Total
UTEP	7	0	3	8	18
Southern Miss	3	7	21	7	38
- Date: December 23, 1988
- Season: 1988
- Stadium: Independence Stadium (Shreveport)
- Location: Shreveport, Louisiana
- MVP: James Henry, PR/CB
- Attendance: 20,242

The 1988 Independence Bowl was a college football postseason bowl game between the Southern Miss Golden Eagles and the UTEP Miners.

== Background ==
This was Southern Miss' first bowl game since 1981 and first Independence Bowl since 1980. This was UTEP's first bowl game since 1967. The two teams had met before, in the 1954 Sun Bowl.

== Game summary ==
Reggie Barrett threw a 30-yard pass to Pat Hegarty for a touchdown to give the Miners the 7-0 lead in the first. Southern Miss countered with a field goal as the first quarter ended. Southern Miss took the lead on a Brett Favre touchdown pass to Reginald Warnsley (after a missed field goal by the Miners) that culminated an 80-yard drive to take a 10-7 lead at halftime. James Henry increased the lead on his 55-yard punt return for a touchdown. Southern Miss made the lead 24-7 on a rushing touchdown by Shelton Gandy. Henry scored once again on a punt return touchdown to make it 31-7. UTEP narrowed the lead to 31-10 on a field goal at the end of three quarters. Gandy scored his second touchdown of the day to make the lead 38-10. UTEP could only muster one other touchdown, on a David Flores touchdown pass. Southern Miss' 108 punt return yards ultimately contributed to the victory, overshadowing UTEP having more offensive yards than the Golden Eagles.

== Aftermath ==
Stull left for Missouri after the season ended. It would take 12 years for UTEP to return to a bowl game, which they also lost. Hallman left for LSU before Southern Miss' next bowl game in 1990.

== Statistics ==
Statistics	Southern Miss	UTEP
First downs	17	19
Yards rushing	168	53
Yards passing	157	308
Total yards	323	361
Punts-Average	6-32.1	6-39.2
Fumbles-Lost	2-0	3-0
Interceptions	2	0
Penalties-Yards	5-45	10-95
