= 1988 New Mexico State Aggies football team =

American college football season

1988 New Mexico State Aggies football
- Conference: Big West Conference
- Record: 1–10 (0–7 Big West)
- Head coach: Mike Knoll (3rd season)
- Home stadium: Aggie Memorial Stadium

1988 Big West Conference football standings
	Conf.					Overall
Team	W		L		T	W		L		T
Fresno State $	7	–	0	–	0	10	–	2	–	0
Cal State Fullerton	5	–	2	–	0	5	–	6	–	0
Utah State	4	–	3	–	0	4	–	7	–	0
San Jose State	4	–	3	–	0	4	–	8	–	0
UNLV	3	–	4	–	0	4	–	7	–	0
Long Beach State	3	–	4	–	0	3	–	9	–	0
Pacific (CA)	2	–	5	–	0	2	–	9	–	0
New Mexico State	0	–	7	–	0	1	–	10	–	0
$ – Conference champion

The 1988 New Mexico State Aggies football team was an American football team that represented New Mexico State University in the Big West Conference during the 1988 NCAA Division I-A football season. In their third year under head coach Mike Knoll, the Aggies compiled a 1–10 record. The team played its home games at Aggie Memorial Stadium in Las Cruces, New Mexico.

== Schedule ==
Date	Opponent	Site	Result	Attendance	Source
September 3	San Jose State	Aggie Memorial Stadium; Las Cruces, NM	L 0–51	12,531	
September 10	New Mexico*	Aggie Memorial Stadium; Las Cruces, NM (rivalry)	L 34–36	21,157	
September 17	at Fresno State	Bulldog Stadium; Fresno, CA	L 0–41	34,459	
September 24	at Utah State	Romney Stadium; Logan, UT	L 20–32	13,792	
October 1	at Kansas*	Memorial Stadium; Lawrence, KS	W 42–29	33,500	
October 15	at UNLV	Sam Boyd Silver Bowl; Whitney, NV	L 20–28	18,729	
October 22	Cal State Fullerton	Aggie Memorial Stadium; Las Cruces, NM	L 3–24	7,397	
October 29	UTEP*	Aggie Memorial Stadium; Las Cruces, NM (rivalry)	L 9–42	30,061	
November 5	at Akron*	Rubber Bowl; Akron, OH	L 7–52	6,147	
November 12	Long Beach State	Aggie Memorial Stadium; Las Cruces, NM	L 16–21	3,356	
November 19	at Pacific (CA)	Stagg Memorial Stadium; Stockton, CA	L 20–21	900	
*Non-conference game
