= 1988 Cal State Fullerton Titans football team =

American college football season

1988 Cal State Fullerton Titans football
- Conference: Big West Conference
- Record: 5–6 (5–2 Big West)
- Head coach: Gene Murphy (9th season)
- Offensive coordinator: Mike Heimerdinger (1st season)
- Defensive coordinator: Kirk Harmon (1st season)
- Home stadium: Santa Ana Stadium

1988 Big West Conference football standings
| | Conf. | | | | | Overall |
| Team | W | | L | | T | W | | L | | T |
|---|---|---|---|---|---|---|---|---|---|---|
| Fresno State $ | 7 | – | 0 | – | 0 | 10 | – | 2 | – | 0 |
| Cal State Fullerton | 5 | – | 2 | – | 0 | 5 | – | 6 | – | 0 |
| Utah State | 4 | – | 3 | – | 0 | 4 | – | 7 | – | 0 |
| San Jose State | 4 | – | 3 | – | 0 | 4 | – | 8 | – | 0 |
| UNLV | 3 | – | 4 | – | 0 | 4 | – | 7 | – | 0 |
| Long Beach State | 3 | – | 4 | – | 0 | 3 | – | 9 | – | 0 |
| Pacific (CA) | 2 | – | 5 | – | 0 | 2 | – | 9 | – | 0 |
| New Mexico State | 0 | – | 7 | – | 0 | 1 | – | 10 | – | 0 |
$ – Conference champion

The 1988 Cal State Fullerton Titans football team represented California State University, Fullerton as a member of the Big West Conference during the 1988 NCAA Division I-A football season. Led by ninth-year head coach Gene Murphy, Cal State Fullerton compiled an overall record of 5–6 with a mark of 5–2 in conference play, placing second in the Big West. The Titans played their home games at Santa Ana Stadium in Santa Ana, California.

== Schedule ==
| Date | Opponent | Site | Result | Attendance | Source |
|---|---|---|---|---|---|
| September 3 | at Southwestern Louisiana* | Cajun Field; Lafayette, LA | L 9–24 | 11,457 | |
| September 10 | at No. 12 West Virginia* | Mountaineer Field; Morgantown, WV | L 10–45 | 54,196 | |
| September 17 | at UNLV | Sam Boyd Silver Bowl; Whitney, NV | W 20–10 | 18,865 | |
| September 24 | Pacific (CA) | Santa Ana Stadium; Santa Ana, CA | W 13–10 | 2,924 | |
| October 1 | at No. 18 Wyoming* | War Memorial Stadium; Laramie, WY | L 16–35 | 22,143 | |
| October 8 | Fresno State | Santa Ana Stadium; Santa Ana, CA | L 10–23 | 5,108 | |
| October 15 | at Long Beach State | Veterans Memorial Stadium; Long Beach, CA | L 22–24 | 7,582 | |
| October 22 | at New Mexico State | Aggie Memorial Stadium; Las Cruces, NM | W 24–3 | 7,397 | |
| October 29 | at Akron* | Rubber Bowl; Akron, OH | L 14–15 | 4,049 | |
| November 12 | San Jose State | Santa Ana Stadium; Santa Ana, CA | W 58–13 | 4,112 | |
| November 19 | Utah State | Santa Ana Stadium; Santa Ana, CA | W 23–13 | 2,119 | |
*Non-conference game; Rankings from AP Poll released prior to the game

== Team players in the NFL ==
The following Cal State Fullerton players were selected in the 1989 NFL draft.

| Player | Position | Round | Overall | NFL team |
| Alex Stewart | Defensive End | 8 | 219 | Minnesota Vikings |
| A.J. Jenkins | Linebacker, defensive end | 9 | 228 | Pittsburgh Steelers |
| Jerry Leggett | Linebacker | 9 | 246 | New Orleans Saints |
