= 1988 San Jose State Spartans football team =

American college football season

1988 San Jose State Spartans football
- Conference: Big West Conference
- Record: 4–8 (4–3 Big West)
- Head coach: Claude Gilbert (5th season)
- Offensive coordinator: Rick Rasnick (2nd season)
- Home stadium: Spartan Stadium

1988 Big West Conference football standings
	Conf.					Overall
Team	W		L		T	W		L		T
Fresno State $	7	–	0	–	0	10	–	2	–	0
Cal State Fullerton	5	–	2	–	0	5	–	6	–	0
Utah State	4	–	3	–	0	4	–	7	–	0
San Jose State	4	–	3	–	0	4	–	8	–	0
UNLV	3	–	4	–	0	4	–	7	–	0
Long Beach State	3	–	4	–	0	3	–	9	–	0
Pacific (CA)	2	–	5	–	0	2	–	9	–	0
New Mexico State	0	–	7	–	0	1	–	10	–	0
$ – Conference champion

The 1988 San Jose State Spartans football team represented San Jose State University during the 1988 NCAA Division I-A football season as a member of the Big West Conference. (Note: This was the first year the conference had been called the Big West. It had been known as the Pacific Coast Athletic Association from its founding in 1969 through 1987.) The team was led by head coach Claude Gilbert, in his fifth year as head coach at San Jose State. They played home games at Spartan Stadium in San Jose, California. The Spartans finished the 1988 season with a record of four wins and eight losses (4–8, 4–3 Big West).

== Schedule ==
Date	Opponent	Site	Result	Attendance	Source
September 3	at New Mexico State	Aggie Memorial Stadium; Las Cruces, NM	W 51–0	12,531	
September 10	Oregon State*	Spartan Stadium; San Jose, CA	L 27–41	17,183	
September 17	at Hawaii*	Aloha Stadium; Halawa, HI (rivalry)	L 27–36	45,683	
September 24	at No. 17 Washington*	Husky Stadium; Seattle, WA	L 31–35	63,692	
October 1	at California*	California Memorial Stadium; Berkeley, CA	L 14–21	40,000	
October 8	at Stanford*	Stanford Stadium; Stanford, CA (rivalry)	L 12–44	55,000	
October 15	at Pacific (CA)	Stagg Memorial Stadium; Stockton, CA (Victory Bell)	W 35–17	9,732	
October 22	Utah State^{†}	Spartan Stadium; San Jose, CA	W 36–31	14,215	
October 29	Fresno State	Spartan Stadium; San Jose, CA (rivalry)	L 15–17	21,367	
November 5	Long Beach State	Spartan Stadium; San Jose, CA	L 13–34	5,788	
November 12	at Cal State Fullerton	Santa Ana Stadium; Santa Ana, CA	L 13–58	4,112	
November 19	at UNLV	Sam Boyd Silver Bowl; Whitney, NV	W 42–0	3,260	
*Non-conference game; ^{†}Homecoming; Rankings from AP Poll released prior to the game

== Game summaries ==
=== at Hawaii ===
San Jose State Spartans at Hawaii Rainbow Warriors – Game summary

Quarter	1	2	3	4	Total
Spartans	7	6	0	14	27
Rainbow Warriors	3	0	27	6	36

at Aloha Stadium • Halawa, HI

- Date: September 17
- Game time: 9:05 p.m. PDT
- Game attendance: 41,384
- Referee: Pat Sweeney

Statistics	SJSU	UH
First downs		
Total yards		
Rushes/yards		
Passing yards		
Passing: Comp–Att–Int		
Time of possession		

Team	Category	Player	Statistics
San Jose State	Passing		
San Jose State	Rushing		
San Jose State	Receiving		
Hawaii	Passing		
Hawaii	Rushing		
Hawaii	Receiving		

Scoring summary

Quarter	Time	Drive			Team	Scoring information	Score	
Quarter	Time	Plays	Yards	TOP	Team	Scoring information	San Jose State	Hawaii
"TOP" = time of possession. For other American football terms, see Glossary of American football.							27	36

- 3 hours, 16 minutes

=== at #17 Washington ===
San Jose State Spartans at #17 Washington Huskies – Game summary

Quarter	1	2	3	4	Total
Spartans	0	14	7	10	31
Huskies	7	21	0	7	35

at Husky Stadium • Seattle, WA

- Date: September 24
- Game time: 1:05 p.m. PDT
- Game attendance: 63,692

Statistics	SJSU	WASH
First downs		
Total yards		
Rushes/yards		
Passing yards		
Passing: Comp–Att–Int		
Time of possession		

Team	Category	Player	Statistics
San Jose State	Passing		
San Jose State	Rushing		
San Jose State	Receiving		
Washington	Passing		
Washington	Rushing		
Washington	Receiving		

Scoring summary

Quarter	Time	Drive			Team	Scoring information	Score	
Quarter	Time	Plays	Yards	TOP	Team	Scoring information	San Jose State	Washington
"TOP" = time of possession. For other American football terms, see Glossary of American football.							31	35

- 3 hours, 16 minutes

=== at California ===
San Jose State Spartans at California Golden Bears – Game summary

Quarter	1	2	3	4	Total
Spartans	0	7	0	7	14
Golden Bears	3	10	0	8	21

at California Memorial Stadium • Berkeley, CA

- Date: October 1
- Game time: 1:05 p.m. PDT

Statistics	SJSU	CAL
First downs		
Total yards		
Rushes/yards		
Passing yards		
Passing: Comp–Att–Int		
Time of possession		

Team	Category	Player	Statistics
San Jose State	Passing		
San Jose State	Rushing		
San Jose State	Receiving		
California	Passing		
California	Rushing		
California	Receiving		

Scoring summary

Quarter	Time	Drive			Team	Scoring information	Score	
Quarter	Time	Plays	Yards	TOP	Team	Scoring information	San Jose State	California
"TOP" = time of possession. For other American football terms, see Glossary of American football.							14	21

- 3 hours, 16 minutes

=== at Stanford ===
San Jose State Spartans at Stanford Cardinal – Game summary

Quarter	1	2	3	4	Total
Spartans	6	6	0	0	12
Cardinal	21	17	6	0	44

at Stanford Stadium • Stanford, CA

- Date: October 8
- Game time: 1:05 p.m. PDT
- Game attendance: 55,000

Statistics	SJSU	STAN
First downs		
Total yards		
Rushes/yards		
Passing yards		
Passing: Comp–Att–Int		
Time of possession		

Team	Category	Player	Statistics
San Jose State	Passing		
San Jose State	Rushing		
San Jose State	Receiving		
Stanford	Passing		
Stanford	Rushing		
Stanford	Receiving		

Scoring summary

Quarter	Time	Drive			Team	Scoring information	Score	
Quarter	Time	Plays	Yards	TOP	Team	Scoring information	San Jose State	Stanford
"TOP" = time of possession. For other American football terms, see Glossary of American football.							12	44

- 3 hours, 16 minutes

== Team players in the NFL ==
The following were selected in the 1989 NFL draft.

Player	Position	Round	Overall	NFL team
Jay Taylor	Defensive back	6	150	Phoenix Cardinals
