= 1988 Long Beach State 49ers football team =

American college football season

1988 Long Beach State 49ers football
- Conference: Big West Conference
- Record: 3–9 (3–4 Big West)
- Head coach: Larry Reisbig (2nd season)
- Defensive coordinator: Ken Visser (8th season)
- Home stadium: Veterans Stadium

1988 Big West Conference football standings
	Conf.					Overall
Team	W		L		T	W		L		T
Fresno State $	7	–	0	–	0	10	–	2	–	0
Cal State Fullerton	5	–	2	–	0	5	–	6	–	0
Utah State	4	–	3	–	0	4	–	7	–	0
San Jose State	4	–	3	–	0	4	–	8	–	0
UNLV	3	–	4	–	0	4	–	7	–	0
Long Beach State	3	–	4	–	0	3	–	9	–	0
Pacific (CA)	2	–	5	–	0	2	–	9	–	0
New Mexico State	0	–	7	–	0	1	–	10	–	0
$ – Conference champion

The 1988 Long Beach State 49ers football team represented California State University, Long Beach (Note: The official name of Long Beach State has been California State University, Long Beach since 1972. However, it is still commonly known as Long Beach State.) during the 1988 NCAA Division I-A football season.

Cal State Long Beach competed in the Big West Conference. The team was led by second-year head coach Larry Reisbig, and played home games at Veterans Stadium on the campus of Long Beach City College in Long Beach, California. They finished the season with a record of three wins and nine losses (3–9, 3–4 Big West). The 49ers offense scored 201 points while the defense allowed 385 points.

== Schedule ==
Date	Opponent	Site	Result	Attendance	Source
September 3	Boise State*	Veterans Stadium; Long Beach, CA	L 10–29	6,032	
September 10	at Oregon*	Autzen Stadium; Eugene, OR	L 0–49	29,238	
September 17	at UCLA*	Rose Bowl; Pasadena, CA	L 3–56	42,464	
October 1	Pacific (CA)	Veterans Stadium; Long Beach, CA	L 10–22	2,919	
October 8	at Utah State	Romney Stadium; Logan, UT	L 24–31	12,686	
October 15	Cal State Fullerton^{†}	Veterans Stadium; Long Beach, CA	W 24–22	7,582	
October 22	at Akron*	Rubber Bowl; Akron, OH	L 0–40	8,132	
October 29	at Hawaii*	Aloha Stadium; Halawa, HI	L 31–34	31,371	
November 5	at San Jose State	Spartan Stadium; San Jose, CA	W 34–13	5,788	
November 12	at New Mexico State	Aggie Memorial Stadium; Las Cruces, NM	W 21–16	3,356	
November 19	at Fresno State	Bulldog Stadium; Fresno, CA	L 3–31	32,774	
November 26	UNLV	Veterans Stadium; Long Beach, CA	L 41–42	2,014	
*Non-conference game; ^{†}Homecoming

== Team players in the NFL ==
The following were selected in the 1989 NFL draft.

Player	Position	Round	Overall	NFL team
Jeff Graham	Quarterback	4	87	Green Bay Packers
R.J. Kors	Defensive back	12	322	Seattle Seahawks
