= 1988 Freedom Bowl =

- Freedom Bowl V
BYU Cougars	Colorado Buffaloes
(8–4)	(8–3)
WAC	Big 8
20	17
Head coach: Lavell Edwards	Head coach: Bill McCartney
AP / Coaches; NR / NR	AP / Coaches; NR / 20
	1	2	3	4	Total
BYU	7	0	7	6	20
Colorado	7	7	0	3	17
- Date: December 29, 1988
- Season: 1988
- Stadium: Anaheim Stadium
- Location: Anaheim, California
- Favorite: Colorado by 3 points
- Attendance: 35,941

United States TV coverage
- Network: Mizlou
- Announcers: Mike Haffner, Jim Grabowski

The 1988 Freedom Bowl in Anaheim, California, pitted former Mountain States Conference rivals BYU and Colorado for the first time in a bowl game. It was only the second time the two teams met one another in football since the Buffaloes joined the Big Eight forty years earlier; the Buffaloes were favored in this bowl by three points.

BYU (8–4, 5–3 WAC, third) came into the game in a bit of a tailspin after losing three of its final four regular season games. Colorado (8–3, 4–3 Big 8, fourth) was a program on the rise, but a year away from becoming a fixture in the top ten.

== Game summary ==
BYU fell into an early hole after a pair of one-yard touchdown runs from halfback Eric Bieniemy gave Colorado a 14–7 lead at halftime. The Cougars rallied in the second half after backup quarterback Ty Detmer was inserted into the game. Detmer completed 11-of-19 passes for 129 yards in the second half. Trailing 17–14 in the fourth quarter, BYU eventually won the game on a pair of field goals - from 31 and 35 yards - by placekicker Jason Chaffetz, a future congressman.

In the stats department, BYU ran for 152 yards on 42 carries while the Buffaloes ran for 273 yards on 60 carries. In passing, BYU had 168 yards on 15-of-28 combined, with one interception. Colorado was 5-for-16 with 64 yards and two interceptions.

== Aftermath ==
The bowl game served as a springboard for both programs over the next couple of seasons. Colorado went undefeated in the regular season in 1989, but lost the Orange Bowl; they claimed a split national championship in 1990, while Detmer won the Heisman Trophy the same year and led BYU to a top-ten ranking at two different points.
