= 1988 San Diego State Aztecs football team =

American college football season

1988 San Diego State Aztecs football
- Conference: Western Athletic Conference
- Record: 3–8 (3–5 WAC)
- Head coach: Denny Stolz (3rd season)
- Offensive coordinator: Dana Bible (3rd season)
- Offensive scheme: Pro-style
- Defensive coordinator: Ed Schmidt (1st season)
- Base defense: 3–4
- Home stadium: Jack Murphy Stadium

1988 Western Athletic Conference football standings
	Conf.					Overall
Team	W		L		T	W		L		T
Wyoming $	8	–	0	–	0	11	–	2	–	0
UTEP	6	–	2	–	0	10	–	3	–	0
Hawaii	5	–	3	–	0	9	–	3	–	0
BYU	5	–	3	–	0	9	–	4	–	0
Utah	4	–	4	–	0	6	–	5	–	0
Air Force	3	–	5	–	0	5	–	7	–	0
San Diego State	3	–	5	–	0	3	–	8	–	0
New Mexico	1	–	7	–	0	2	–	10	–	0
Colorado State	1	–	7	–	0	1	–	10	–	0
$ – Conference champion

The 1988 San Diego State Aztecs football team represented San Diego State University as a member of the Western Athletic Conference (WAC) during the 1988 NCAA Division I-A football season. Led by Denny Stolz in his third and final season, the Aztecs compiled an overall record of 3–8 with a mark of 3–5 conference play, tying for sixth place in the WAC. The team played home games at Jack Murphy Stadium in San Diego.

Stolz was fired after the season, two years after leading the Aztecs to their only WAC title and appearance in San Diego's Holiday Bowl in his first season in 1986.

== Schedule ==
Date	Opponent	Site	TV	Result	Attendance	Source
September 3	at No. 5 UCLA*	Rose Bowl; Pasadena, CA		L 6–59	46,487	
September 11	Air Force	Jack Murphy Stadium; San Diego, CA	Prime	W 39–36	20,112	
September 17	at Stanford*	Stanford Stadium; Stanford, CA		L 10–31	26,000	
October 1	No. 20 Oregon*	Jack Murphy Stadium; San Diego, CA		L 13–34	22,527	
October 8	No. 16 Wyoming	Jack Murphy Stadium; San Diego, CA		L 27–55	20,386	
October 15	Hawaii^{†}	Jack Murphy Stadium; San Diego, CA		L 30–32	27,142	
October 22	at Colorado State	Hughes Stadium; Fort Collins, CO		L 7–13	23,817	
October 29	at Utah	Robert Rice Stadium; Salt Lake City, UT		L 20–41	22,453	
November 5	No. 20 BYU	Jack Murphy Stadium; San Diego, CA		W 27–15	21,825	
November 12	at UTEP	Sun Bowl; El Paso, TX		L 7–58	31,552	
November 19	at New Mexico	University Stadium; Albuquerque, NM		W 18–10	7,923	
*Non-conference game; ^{†}Homecoming; Rankings from AP Poll released prior to the game

== Season summary ==
=== Air Force ===
External videos
- 1988 San Diego State vs. Air Force - Denny Stolz Show

Paul Hewitt rushed for 259 yards and four touchdowns, including the game-winning one-yard run with 24 seconds left.

== Team players in the NFL ==
The following were selected in the 1989 NFL draft.

Player	Position	Round	Overall	NFL team
Alfred Jackson	Wide Receiver	5	135	Los Angeles Rams

== Team awards ==
Award	Player
Most Valuable Player (John Simcox Memorial Trophy)	Monty Gilbreath; Paul Hewitt
Outstanding Offensive & Defensive Linemen (Byron H. Chase Memorial Trophy)	Kevin Wells, Off; Brad Burton, Def
Team captains Dr. R. Hardy / C.E. Peterson Memorial Trophy	Alfred Jackson, Off; Kevin Wells, Off; Mario Mitchell, Def
Most Inspirational Player	Monty Gilbreath
