= 1988 Colorado State Rams football team =

American college football season

1988 Colorado State Rams football
- Conference: Western Athletic Conference
- Record: 1–10 (1–7 WAC)
- Head coach: Leon Fuller (7th season)
- Offensive coordinator: Kay Dalton (2nd season)
- Defensive coordinator: Harold Richardson (2nd season)
- Home stadium: Hughes Stadium

1988 Western Athletic Conference football standings
	Conf.					Overall
Team	W		L		T	W		L		T
Wyoming $	8	–	0	–	0	11	–	2	–	0
UTEP	6	–	2	–	0	10	–	3	–	0
Hawaii	5	–	3	–	0	9	–	3	–	0
BYU	5	–	3	–	0	9	–	4	–	0
Utah	4	–	4	–	0	6	–	5	–	0
Air Force	3	–	5	–	0	5	–	7	–	0
San Diego State	3	–	5	–	0	3	–	8	–	0
New Mexico	1	–	7	–	0	2	–	10	–	0
Colorado State	1	–	7	–	0	1	–	10	–	0
$ – Conference champion

The 1988 Colorado State Rams football team represented Colorado State University in the Western Athletic Conference during the 1988 NCAA Division I-A football season. In their seventh season under head coach Leon Fuller, the Rams compiled a 1–10 record.

== Schedule ==
Date	Opponent	Site	Result	Attendance	Source
September 3	Air Force	Hughes Stadium; Fort Collins, CO (rivalry)	L 23–29	25,471	
September 10	Hawaii	Hughes Stadium; Fort Collins, CO	L 23–31	21,741	
September 17	at Arizona State*	Sun Devil Stadium; Tempe, AZ	L 17–28	70,822	
October 1	Colorado*	Hughes Stadium; Fort Collins, CO (rivalry)	L 23–27	33,979	
October 8	at BYU	Cougar Stadium; Provo, UT	L 7–42	65,281	
October 15	at UTEP	Sun Bowl; El Paso, TX	L 14–34	45,187	
October 22	San Diego State	Hughes Stadium; Fort Collins, CO	W 13–7	23,817	
October 29	No. 10 Wyoming	Hughes Stadium; Fort Collins, CO (rivalry)	L 14–48	26,017	
November 5	at Utah	Robert Rice Stadium; Salt Lake City, UT	L 7–46	20,470	
November 12	at New Mexico	University Stadium; Albuquerque, NM	L 23–24	8,180	
November 26	at Tulsa*	Skelly Stadium; Tulsa, OK	L 28–32	7,500	
*Non-conference game; Rankings from Coaches' Poll released prior to the game
