= 1988 UNLV Rebels football team =

American college football season

1988 UNLV Rebels football
- Conference: Big West Conference
- Record: 4–7 (3–4 Big West)
- Head coach: Wayne Nunnely (3rd season)
- Offensive coordinator: Carl Ferrill (2nd season)
- Home stadium: Sam Boyd Silver Bowl

1988 Big West Conference football standings
	Conf.					Overall
Team	W		L		T	W		L		T
Fresno State $	7	–	0	–	0	10	–	2	–	0
Cal State Fullerton	5	–	2	–	0	5	–	6	–	0
Utah State	4	–	3	–	0	4	–	7	–	0
San Jose State	4	–	3	–	0	4	–	8	–	0
UNLV	3	–	4	–	0	4	–	7	–	0
Long Beach State	3	–	4	–	0	3	–	9	–	0
Pacific (CA)	2	–	5	–	0	2	–	9	–	0
New Mexico State	0	–	7	–	0	1	–	10	–	0
$ – Conference champion

The 1988 UNLV Rebels football team was an American football team that represented the University of Nevada, Las Vegas (UNLV) as a member of the Big West Conference during the 1988 NCAA Division I-A football season. In their third year under head coach Wayne Nunnely, the Rebels compiled an overall record of 4–7 with a mark of 3–4 in conference play, tying for fifth place in the Big West. The team played home games at the Sam Boyd Silver Bowl in Whitney, Nevada.

== Schedule ==
Date	Opponent	Site	Result	Attendance	Source
September 3	at Baylor*	Baylor Stadium; Waco, TX	L 3–27	25,610	
September 17	Cal State Fullerton	Sam Boyd Silver Bowl; Whitney, NV	L 10–20	18,865	
September 24	Ohio*	Sam Boyd Silver Bowl; Whitney, NV	W 26–18	16,266	
October 1	at No. 9 Nebraska*	Memorial Stadium; Lincoln, NE	L 6–48	76,398	
October 8	at Pacific (CA)	Pacific Memorial Stadium; Stockton, CA	W 30–16	6,233	
October 15	New Mexico State	Sam Boyd Silver Bowl; Whitney, NV	W 28–20	18,729	
October 29	Tulsa*	Sam Boyd Silver Bowl; Whitney, NV	L 7–33	18,425	
November 5	at Utah State	Romney Stadium; Logan, UT	L 10–17	8,606	
November 12	Fresno State	Sam Boyd Silver Bowl; Whitney, NV	L 14–31	23,408	
November 19	San Jose State	Sam Boyd Silver Bowl; Whitney, NV	L 0–42	3,260	
November 26	at Long Beach State	Veterans Memorial Stadium; Long Beach, CA	W 42–41	2,014	
*Non-conference game; Rankings from Coaches' Poll released prior to the game
