= 1988 California Bowl =

Western Michigan Broncos	Fresno State Bulldogs
(9–2)	(9–2)
30	35
Head coach: Al Molde	Head coach: Jim Sweeney
	1	2	3	4	Total
Western Michigan	0	17	7	6	30
Fresno State	7	7	21	0	35
- Date: December 10, 1988
- Season: 1988
- Stadium: Bulldog Stadium
- Location: Fresno, California
- Referee: Jack Baker (WAC)

The 1988 California Bowl was an American college football bowl game played on December 10, 1988 at Bulldog Stadium in Fresno, California. The game pitted the Fresno State Bulldogs and the Western Michigan Broncos.

== Background ==
The Broncos started the season with a non-conference win over Wisconsin, and they promptly won the next four games (including three conference games) before a loss to Kent State. It was their only conference loss (though they did lose to independent and future MAC member Northern Illinois), closing out the season with a 23–16 win over Ohio. This was their first Mid-American Conference title since 1966, though it was their first non shared titled since 1929. It was also their first bowl game since 1961. Fresno State had a perfect conference record once again en route to their third Big West Conference title (and third California Bowl) in seven seasons.

== Game summary ==
- Fresno State - Andre Alexander, 55 yard touchdown pass from Mark Barsotti (Loop kick)
- Fresno State - Andre Alexander, 38 yard touchdown pass from Mark Barsotti (Loop kick)
- Western Michigan - Robert Oliver, 31 yard touchdown pass from Tony Kimbrough (Creek kick)
- Western Michigan - Robert Davis, 51 yard touchdown run (Creek kick)
- Western Michigan - John Creek, 29 yard field goal
- Fresno State - Darrell Rosette, 65 yard touchdown run (Loop kick)
- Western Michigan - Robert Davis, 15 yard touchdown pass from Kimbrough (Creek kick)
- Fresno State - Darrell Rosette, 4 yard touchdown run (Loop kick)
- Fresno State - Myron Jones, 26 yard touchdown run (Loop kick)
- Western Michigan - Tony Kimbrough, 6 yard touchdown run (pass failed)

Darrell Rosette rushed for 149 yards as the Bulldogs scored 21 points in the third quarter to outplay the Broncos.

== Aftermath ==
Western Michigan, despite having numerous seasons over .500 in the next few years (and two losses in the MAC Championship Game in 1999 and 2000), they were not invited to a bowl game until 2007. They did not win a bowl game until 2015, nor win the conference again until 2016. Fresno State won the conference the following year and faced off in the California Bowl, winning once again.
