= 1988 Utah State Aggies football team =

American college football season

1988 Utah State Aggies football
- Conference: Big West Conference
- Record: 4–7 (4–3 Big West)
- Head coach: Chuck Shelton (3rd season)
- Offensive coordinator: Brian Billick (3rd season)
- Defensive coordinator: Fred Bleil (3rd season)
- Home stadium: Romney Stadium

1988 Big West Conference football standings
| | Conf. | | | | | Overall |
| Team | W | | L | | T | W | | L | | T |
|---|---|---|---|---|---|---|---|---|---|---|
| Fresno State $ | 7 | – | 0 | – | 0 | 10 | – | 2 | – | 0 |
| Cal State Fullerton | 5 | – | 2 | – | 0 | 5 | – | 6 | – | 0 |
| Utah State | 4 | – | 3 | – | 0 | 4 | – | 7 | – | 0 |
| San Jose State | 4 | – | 3 | – | 0 | 4 | – | 8 | – | 0 |
| UNLV | 3 | – | 4 | – | 0 | 4 | – | 7 | – | 0 |
| Long Beach State | 3 | – | 4 | – | 0 | 3 | – | 9 | – | 0 |
| Pacific (CA) | 2 | – | 5 | – | 0 | 2 | – | 9 | – | 0 |
| New Mexico State | 0 | – | 7 | – | 0 | 1 | – | 10 | – | 0 |
$ – Conference champion

The 1988 Utah State Aggies football team represented Utah State University during the 1988 NCAA Division I-A football season as a member of the Big West Conference. The Aggies were led by third-year head coach Chuck Shelton and played their home games at Romney Stadium in Logan, Utah. They finished the season with a record of four wins and seven losses (4–7, 4–3 Big West).

== Schedule ==
| Date | Opponent | Site | Result | Attendance | Source |
|---|---|---|---|---|---|
| September 3 | at No. 2 Nebraska* | Memorial Stadium; Lincoln, NE | L 13–63 | 76,233 | |
| September 10 | at Missouri* | Faurot Field; Columbia, MO | L 21–35 | 35,232 | |
| September 24 | New Mexico State | Romney Stadium; Logan, UT | W 32–20 | 13,792 | |
| September 30 | at BYU* | Cougar Stadium; Provo, UT (rivalry, Beehive Boot) | L 3–38 | 65,702 | |
| October 8 | Long Beach State | Romney Stadium; Logan, UT | W 31–24 | 12,686 | |
| October 15 | at Fresno State | Bulldog Stadium; Fresno, CA | L 10–51 | 34,942 | |
| October 22 | at San Jose State | Spartan Stadium; San Jose, CA | L 31–36 | 14,215 | |
| October 29 | Pacific (CA) | Romney Stadium; Logan, UT | W 23–20 | 13,147 | |
| November 5 | UNLV | Romney Stadium; Logan, UT | W 17–10 | 8,606 | |
| November 12 | Utah* | Romney Stadium; Logan, UT (Battle of the Brothers, Beehive Boot) | L 21–42 | 16,578 | |
| November 19 | at Cal State Fullerton | Santa Ana Stadium; Santa Ana, CA | L 13–23 | 2,119 | |
*Non-conference game; Rankings from AP Poll released prior to the game
