= 1988 Kent State Golden Flashes football team =

American college football season

1988 Kent State Golden Flashes football
- Conference: Mid-American Conference
- Record: 5–6 (3–5 MAC)
- Head coach: Dick Crum (1st season)
- Home stadium: Dix Stadium

1988 Mid-American Conference football standings
	Conf.					Overall
Team	W		L		T	W		L		T
Western Michigan $	7	–	1	–	0	9	–	3	–	0
Eastern Michigan	5	–	2	–	1	6	–	3	–	1
Ball State	5	–	3	–	0	8	–	3	–	0
Central Michigan	5	–	3	–	0	7	–	4	–	0
Ohio	4	–	3	–	1	4	–	6	–	1
Toledo	4	–	4	–	0	6	–	5	–	0
Kent State	3	–	5	–	0	5	–	6	–	0
Bowling Green	1	–	6	–	1	2	–	8	–	1
Miami (OH)	0	–	7	–	1	0	–	10	–	1
$ – Conference champion

The 1988 Kent State Golden Flashes football team was an American football team that represented Kent State University in the Mid-American Conference (MAC) during the 1988 NCAA Division I-A football season. In their first season under head coach Dick Crum, the Golden Flashes compiled a 5–6 record (3–5 against MAC opponents), finished in seventh place in the MAC, and outscored all opponents by a combined total of 256 to 250.

The team's statistical leaders included Eric Wilkerson with 1,325 rushing yards, Patrick Young with 650 passing yards, and Fermin Olivera with 180 receiving yards. Four Kent State players were selected as first-team All-MAC players: center Chip Curtis, defensive back Jamie Howell, defensive lineman Bert Weidner, and tailback Eric Wilkerson.

== Schedule ==
Date	Opponent	Site	Result	Attendance	Source
September 3	Youngstown State*	Dix Stadium; Kent, OH	W 34–3	13,500	
September 10	Akron*	Dix Stadium; Kent, OH (Wagon Wheel)	W 32–12	23,500	
September 17	at Eastern Michigan	Rynearson Stadium; Ypsilanti, MI	L 14–21	16,478	
September 24	at Kentucky*	Commonwealth Stadium; Lexington, KY	L 14–38	47,989	
October 1	at Central Michigan	Kelly/Shorts Stadium; Mount Pleasant, MI	L 7–31		
October 8	Ball State	Dix Stadium; Kent, OH	L 20–31	17,500	
October 15	at Western Michigan	Waldo Stadium; Kalamazoo, MI	W 45–28	17,204	
October 22	Ohio	Dix Stadium; Kent, OH	L 14–21	15,100	
October 29	at Toledo	Glass Bowl; Toledo, OH	L 28–35	16,937	
November 5	Bowling Green	Dix Stadium; Kent, OH (Anniversary Award)	W 31–19	5,300	
November 12	at Miami (OH)	Yager Stadium; Oxford, OH	W 17–11	19,455	
*Non-conference game
