= 1988 Ohio Bobcats football team =

American college football season

1988 Ohio Bobcats football
- Conference: Mid-American Conference
- Record: 4–6–1 (4–3–1 MAC)
- Head coach: Cleve Bryant (4th season)
- Home stadium: Peden Stadium

1988 Mid-American Conference football standings
	Conf.					Overall
Team	W		L		T	W		L		T
Western Michigan $	7	–	1	–	0	9	–	3	–	0
Eastern Michigan	5	–	2	–	1	6	–	3	–	1
Ball State	5	–	3	–	0	8	–	3	–	0
Central Michigan	5	–	3	–	0	7	–	4	–	0
Ohio	4	–	3	–	1	4	–	6	–	1
Toledo	4	–	4	–	0	6	–	5	–	0
Kent State	3	–	5	–	0	5	–	6	–	0
Bowling Green	1	–	6	–	1	2	–	8	–	1
Miami (OH)	0	–	7	–	1	0	–	10	–	1
$ – Conference champion

The 1988 Ohio Bobcats football team was an American football team that represented Ohio University in the Mid-American Conference (MAC) during the 1988 NCAA Division I-A football season. In their fourth season under head coach Cleve Bryant, the Bobcats compiled a 4–6–1 record (4–3–1 against MAC opponents), finished in fifth place in the MAC, and were outscored by all opponents by a combined total of 288 to 195. They played their home games in Peden Stadium in Athens, Ohio.

== Schedule ==
Date	Opponent	Site	Result	Attendance	Source
September 10	at No. 10 Marshall*	Fairfield Stadium; Huntington, WV (rivalry)	L 14–31		
September 17	at Purdue*	Ross–Ade Stadium; West Lafayette, IN	L 10–33	60,658	
September 24	at UNLV*	Sam Boyd Silver Bowl; Whitney, NV	L 18–26	16,266	
October 1	Toledo	Peden Stadium; Athens, OH	W 24–14		
October 8	at Bowling Green	Doyt Perry Stadium; Bowling Green, OH	L 0–42		
October 15	Miami (OH)	Peden Stadium; Athens, OH (rivalry)	W 38–21	18,240	
October 22	at Kent State	Dix Stadium; Kent, OH	W 21–14	15,100	
October 29	Eastern Michigan	Peden Stadium; Athens, OH	T 17–17		
November 5	at Central Michigan	Kelly/Shorts Stadium; Mount Pleasant, MI	L 10–42		
November 12	Ball State	Peden Stadium; Athens, OH	W 27–25	7,238	
November 19	at Western Michigan	Waldo Stadium; Kalamazoo, MI	L 16–23	8,250	
*Non-conference game; Rankings from NCAA Division I-AA Football Committee Poll released prior to the game
