= 1988 Fresno State Bulldogs football team =

American college football season

1988 Fresno State Bulldogs football

Big West champion California Bowl champion

California Bowl, W 35–30 vs. Western Michigan
- Conference: Big West Conference
- Record: 10–2 (7–0 Big West)
- Head coach: Jim Sweeney (11th season)
- Home stadium: Bulldog Stadium

1988 Big West Conference football standings
	Conf.					Overall
Team	W		L		T	W		L		T
Fresno State $	7	–	0	–	0	10	–	2	–	0
Cal State Fullerton	5	–	2	–	0	5	–	6	–	0
Utah State	4	–	3	–	0	4	–	7	–	0
San Jose State	4	–	3	–	0	4	–	8	–	0
UNLV	3	–	4	–	0	4	–	7	–	0
Long Beach State	3	–	4	–	0	3	–	9	–	0
Pacific (CA)	2	–	5	–	0	2	–	9	–	0
New Mexico State	0	–	7	–	0	1	–	10	–	0
$ – Conference champion

The 1988 Fresno State Bulldogs football team represented California State University, Fresno as a member of the Big West Conference during the 1988 NCAA Division I-A football season. Led by 11th-year head coach Jim Sweeney, Fresno State compiled an overall record of 10–2 with a mark of 7–0 in conference play, winning the Big West title. The Bulldogs played their home games at Bulldog Stadium in Fresno, California.

Fresno State earned their third NCAA Division I-A postseason bowl game berth in 1988. They played the Mid-American Conference (MAC) champion Western Michigan Broncos in the eighth annual California Bowl at Bulldog Stadium on December 18. The Bulldogs won their third consecutives bowl game by beating Western Michigan, 35–30.

== Schedule ==
Date	Opponent	Site	Result	Attendance	Source
September 3	at New Mexico*	University Stadium; Albuquerque, NM	W 68–21	18,061	
September 10	at Colorado*	Folsom Field; Boulder, CO	L 3–45	32,417	
September 17	New Mexico State	Bulldog Stadium; Fresno, CA	W 41–0	34,459	
September 24	McNeese State*	Bulldog Stadium; Fresno, CA	W 49–0	34,503	
October 1	at Oregon State*	Parker Stadium; Corvallis, OR	L 10–21	28,179	
October 8	at Cal State Fullerton	Santa Ana Stadium; Santa Ana, CA	W 23–10	5,108	
October 15	Utah State	Bulldog Stadium; Fresno, CA	W 51–10	34,942	
October 29	at San Jose State	Spartan Stadium; San Jose, CA (rivalry)	W 17–15	21,367	
November 5	Pacific (CA)	Bulldog Stadium; Fresno, CA	W 34–0	34,436	
November 12	at UNLV	Sam Boyd Silver Bowl; Whitney, NV	W 31–14	23,408	
November 19	Long Beach State	Bulldog Stadium; Fresno, CA	W 31–3	32,774	
December 10	Western Michigan*	Bulldog Stadium; Fresno, CA (California Bowl)	W 35–30	31,272	
*Non-conference game

== Team players in the NFL ==
The following were selected in the 1989 NFL draft.

Player	Position	Round	Overall	NFL team
Tracy Rogers	Linebacker	7	190	Houston Oilers
