= 1988 Utah Utes football team =

American college football season

1988 Utah Utes football
- Conference: Western Athletic Conference
- Record: 6–5 (4–4 WAC)
- Head coach: Jim Fassel (4th season)
- Offensive coordinator: Jack Reilly (4th season)
- Defensive coordinator: Tom Gadd (8th season)
- Home stadium: Robert Rice Stadium

1988 Western Athletic Conference football standings
	Conf.					Overall
Team	W		L		T	W		L		T
Wyoming $	8	–	0	–	0	11	–	2	–	0
UTEP	6	–	2	–	0	10	–	3	–	0
Hawaii	5	–	3	–	0	9	–	3	–	0
BYU	5	–	3	–	0	9	–	4	–	0
Utah	4	–	4	–	0	6	–	5	–	0
Air Force	3	–	5	–	0	5	–	7	–	0
San Diego State	3	–	5	–	0	3	–	8	–	0
New Mexico	1	–	7	–	0	2	–	10	–	0
Colorado State	1	–	7	–	0	1	–	10	–	0
$ – Conference champion

The 1988 Utah Utes football team represented the University of Utah as a member of the Western Athletic Conference (WAC) during the 1988 NCAA Division I-A football season. In their fourth season under head coach Jim Fassel, the Utes compiled an overall record of 6–5 with a mark of 4–4 against conference opponents, finished in fifth place in the WAC, and were outscored by their opponents 399 to 357. The team played home games at Robert Rice Stadium in Salt Lake City.

Utah's statistical leaders included Scott Mitchell with 4,322 passing yards, Eddie Johnson with 748 rushing yards, and Carl Harry with 1,145 receiving yards.

== Schedule ==
Date	Time	Opponent	Site	Result	Attendance	Source
September 10	7:00 pm	Idaho State*	Robert Rice Stadium; Salt Lake City, UT	W 41–16	28,422	
September 17	2:00 pm	at Illinois*	Memorial Stadium; Champaign, IL	L 24–35	54,002	
September 24	7:00 pm	Hawaii	Robert Rice Stadium; Salt Lake City, UT	L 20–48	32,892	
October 1	7:05 pm	at UTEP	Sun Bowl; El Paso, TX	L 28–38	40,578	
October 8	1:05 pm	at New Mexico	University Stadium; Albuquerque, NM	W 33–27	10,960	
October 15	12:00 pm	Air Force	Robert Rice Stadium; Salt Lake City, UT	L 49–56	25,331	
October 22	1:00 pm	at No. 12 Wyoming	War Memorial Stadium; Laramie, WY	L 18–61	20,800	
October 29	12:00 pm	San Diego State^{†}	Robert Rice Stadium; Salt Lake City, UT	W 41–20	22,453	
November 5	12:00 pm	Colorado State	Robert Rice Stadium; Salt Lake City, UT	W 46–7	20,470	
November 12	1:00 pm	at Utah State*	Romney Stadium; Logan, UT (Battle of the Brothers)	W 42–21	16,578	
November 19	12:00 pm	BYU	Robert Rice Stadium; Salt Lake City, UT (Holy War)	W 57–28	34,216	
*Non-conference game; ^{†}Homecoming; Rankings from AP Poll released prior to the game; All times are in Mountain time

== Roster ==
1988 Utah Utes football team roster
Players			Coaches
Offense: Pos. / # / Name / Class; QB / 19 / Scott Mitchell / So	Defense: Pos. / # / Name / Class	Special teams: Pos. / # / Name / Class	Head coach: Jim Fassel; Coordinators/assistant coaches Legend: (C) Team captain; (S) Suspended; (I) Ineligible; Injured; Redshirt
