= 1988 Wyoming Cowboys football team =

American college football season

1988 Wyoming Cowboys football

WAC champion

Holiday Bowl, L 14–62 vs. Oklahoma State
- Conference: Western Athletic Conference

Ranking
- Coaches: No. 20
- Record: 11–2 (8–0 WAC)
- Head coach: Paul Roach (2nd season)
- Offensive coordinator: Joe Tiller (2nd season)
- Home stadium: War Memorial Stadium

1988 Western Athletic Conference football standings
	Conf.					Overall
Team	W		L		T	W		L		T
Wyoming $	8	–	0	–	0	11	–	2	–	0
UTEP	6	–	2	–	0	10	–	3	–	0
Hawaii	5	–	3	–	0	9	–	3	–	0
BYU	5	–	3	–	0	9	–	4	–	0
Utah	4	–	4	–	0	6	–	5	–	0
Air Force	3	–	5	–	0	5	–	7	–	0
San Diego State	3	–	5	–	0	3	–	8	–	0
New Mexico	1	–	7	–	0	2	–	10	–	0
Colorado State	1	–	7	–	0	1	–	10	–	0
$ – Conference champion

The 1988 Wyoming Cowboys football team represented the University of Wyoming in the 1988 NCAA Division I-A football season. It was the Cowboys' 93rd season and they competed as a member of the Western Athletic Conference (WAC). The team was led by head coach Paul Roach, in his second year, and played their home games at War Memorial Stadium in Laramie, Wyoming. The Cowboys won the first 10 games of the season, with an average margin of victory of 30 points, claiming the WAC championship with an undefeated 8–0 record, and reaching a No. 10 ranking in the AP poll. However, the season ended with two disastrous losses in the last three games, including a 62–14 rout by Oklahoma State (led by Heisman Trophy winner Barry Sanders) in the Holiday Bowl. The Cowboys offense scored 511 points, while the defense allowed 280 points.

== Schedule ==
Date	Opponent	Rank	Site	TV	Result	Attendance	Source
September 1	BYU		War Memorial Stadium; Laramie, WY		W 24–14	28,847	
September 8	at Louisville*		Cardinal Stadium; Louisville, KY		W 44–9	29,105	
September 17	Louisiana Tech*		War Memorial Stadium; Laramie, WY		W 38–6	18,128	
September 24	at Air Force		Falcon Stadium; Colorado Springs, CO		W 48–45	44,028	
October 1	Cal State Fullerton*	No. 18	War Memorial Stadium; Laramie, WY		W 35–16	22,143	
October 8	at San Diego State	No. 16	Jack Murphy Stadium; San Diego, CA		W 55–27	20,386	
October 15	New Mexico	No. 14	War Memorial Stadium; Laramie, WY		W 55–7	20,363	
October 22	Utah	No. 12	War Memorial Stadium; Laramie, WY		W 61–18	20,800	
October 29	at Colorado State	No. 10	Hughes Stadium; Fort Collins, CO (rivalry)		W 48–14	26,017	
November 5	UTEP	No. 10	War Memorial Stadium; Laramie, WY		W 51–6	32,210	
November 12	at Houston*	No. 10	Houston Astrodome; Houston, TX	ESPN	L 10–34	28,947	
November 19	at Hawaii	No. 16	Aloha Stadium; Halawa, HI (rivalry)		W 28–22	43,177	
December 30	vs. No. 12 Oklahoma State*	No. 15	Jack Murphy Stadium; San Diego, CA (Holiday Bowl)	ESPN	L 14–62	60,178	
*Non-conference game; Rankings from AP Poll released prior to the game

== 1989 NFL draft ==
The following were selected in the 1989 NFL draft.

Player	Position	Round	Overall	NFL team
Eric Coleman	Defensive back	2	43	New England Patriots
David Edeen	Defensive end	5	128	Arizona Cardinals
Pat Rabold	Defensive tackle	9	249	Buffalo Bills
