= 1988 Toledo Rockets football team =

American college football season

1988 Toledo Rockets football
- Conference: Mid-American Conference
- Record: 6–5 (4–4 MAC)
- Head coach: Dan Simrell (7th season)
- Home stadium: Glass Bowl

1988 Mid-American Conference football standings
	Conf.					Overall
Team	W		L		T	W		L		T
Western Michigan $	7	–	1	–	0	9	–	3	–	0
Eastern Michigan	5	–	2	–	1	6	–	3	–	1
Ball State	5	–	3	–	0	8	–	3	–	0
Central Michigan	5	–	3	–	0	7	–	4	–	0
Ohio	4	–	3	–	1	4	–	6	–	1
Toledo	4	–	4	–	0	6	–	5	–	0
Kent State	3	–	5	–	0	5	–	6	–	0
Bowling Green	1	–	6	–	1	2	–	8	–	1
Miami (OH)	0	–	7	–	1	0	–	10	–	1
$ – Conference champion

The 1988 Toledo Rockets football team was an American football team that represented the University of Toledo in the Mid-American Conference (MAC) during the 1988 NCAA Division I-A football season. In their seventh season under head coach Dan Simrell, the Rockets compiled a 6–5 record (4–4 against MAC opponents), finished in sixth place in the MAC, and outscored all opponents by a combined total of 244 to 221.

The team's statistical leaders included Steve Keene with 793 passing yards, Neil Trotter with 783 rushing yards, and Rick Isaiah with 389 receiving yards.

== Schedule ==
Date	Opponent	Site	Result	Attendance	Source
September 3	at Ball State	Ball State Stadium; Muncie, IN	L 3–13	9,130	
September 10	Western Michigan	Glass Bowl; Toledo, OH	L 9–31	17,946	
September 17	at McNeese State*	Cowboy Stadium; Lake Charles, LA	L 19–46	19,750	
September 24	Bowling Green	Glass Bowl; Toledo, OH (rivalry)	W 34–5		
October 1	at Ohio	Peden Stadium; Athens, OH	L 14–24		
October 8	Northern Illinois*	Glass Bowl; Toledo, OH	W 33–20	17,038	
October 15	Austin Peay*	Glass Bowl; Toledo, OH	W 38–14		
October 22	at Miami (OH)	Yager Stadium; Oxford, OH	W 20–7	14,927	
October 29	Kent State	Glass Bowl; Toledo, OH	W 35–28	16,937	
November 5	at Eastern Michigan	Rynearson Stadium; Ypsilanti, MI	L 19–20	8,338	
November 12	Central Michigan	Glass Bowl; Toledo, OH	W 20–13		
*Non-conference game
