= 1988 NCAA Division I-A football season =

American college football season

1988 NCAA Division I-A season
- Number of teams: 104
- Preseason AP No. 1: Florida State

Postseason
- Bowl games: 17
- Heisman Trophy: Oklahoma State running back Barry Sanders
- Champion(s): Notre Dame (AP, Coaches, FWAA)

Division I-A football seasons
- ← 1987 1989 →

The 1988 NCAA Division I-A football season ended with Notre Dame winning the national championship. The Fighting Irish won the title via a 34–21 defeat of previously unbeaten West Virginia in the Fiesta Bowl in Tempe, Arizona. With 4 of the final Top 5 teams being independents (with the University of Miami and Florida State joining the Fighting Irish and Mountaineers), 1988 became a focus for fans and critics who wondered how the traditional conferences would deal with the indies (the answer ultimately involved all of these teams joining major conferences).

Notre Dame had several notable victories this season, including a 19–17 victory over No. 9 Michigan, won on a last drive field goal, which started off the championship season. The season's marquee game was a 31–30 victory over No. 1 Miami. Entering the game, Miami had a 36-game regular season winning streak, 20 straight road victories and a 16-game winning streak overall. This year was also the first time Notre Dame and USC had ever met when ranked No. 1 and No. 2. Most notable about this game is Notre Dame coach Lou Holtz's decision to leave behind two of his stars, Tony Brooks and Ricky Watters because they were late, cementing discipline as the main theme of this championship team.

This year's edition of the UCLA–USC rivalry game featured a second ranked USC and a fourth ranked UCLA. For the second year in a row the Rose Bowl berth was on the line but for USC it also had national title implications as the rivalry game with Notre Dame was the following week. USC beat UCLA but lost to Notre Dame, and then lost to Michigan in the Rose Bowl.

Oklahoma State running back Barry Sanders ran the Wing T offense all the way to the Heisman Trophy and numerous rushing records.

== Rule changes ==
- Defensive teams can now return blocked PAT kicks and interceptions on two-point conversion attempts for a defensive score worth two points. Fumbles on PAT/two-point conversions cannot be recovered and advanced by the offensive team other than the fumbling player, and the defense cannot convert fumbles into two-point defensive scores. There were two defensive conversions scored in Division I-A; the first was scored by Bill Stone of Rice University in a 54–11 loss to Notre Dame on November 5, 1988, and the second by Tony Bennett of Mississippi in a 20–12 loss to Tennessee on November 12, 1988, both on blocked PAT kicks.
- Teams are permitted to take consecutive time-outs, previously this was prohibited.
- Illegal use of hands penalties are increased from 5 to 10 yards.

== Conference and program changes ==
- The Pacific Coast Athletic Association (PCAA) changed its name to the Big West Conference, its current name, prior to the season.

== Conference standings ==
1988 Atlantic Coast Conference football standings
	Conf.					Overall
Team	W		L		T	W		L		T
No. 9 Clemson $	6	–	1	–	0	10	–	2	–	0
Virginia	5	–	2	–	0	7	–	4	–	0
NC State	4	–	2	–	1	8	–	3	–	1
Wake Forest	4	–	3	–	0	6	–	4	–	1
Maryland	4	–	3	–	0	5	–	6	–	0
Duke	3	–	3	–	1	7	–	3	–	1
North Carolina	1	–	6	–	0	1	–	10	–	0
Georgia Tech	0	–	7	–	0	3	–	8	–	0
$ – Conference champion; Rankings from AP Poll

1988 Big Eight Conference football standings
	Conf.					Overall
Team	W		L		T	W		L		T
No. 10 Nebraska $	7	–	0	–	0	11	–	2	–	0
No. 14 Oklahoma	6	–	1	–	0	9	–	3	–	0
No. 11 Oklahoma State	5	–	2	–	0	10	–	2	–	0
Colorado	4	–	3	–	0	8	–	4	–	0
Iowa State	3	–	4	–	0	5	–	6	–	0
Missouri	2	–	5	–	0	3	–	7	–	1
Kansas	1	–	6	–	0	1	–	10	–	0
Kansas State	0	–	7	–	0	0	–	11	–	0
$ – Conference champion; Rankings from AP Poll

1988 Big Ten Conference football standings
	Conf.					Overall
Team	W		L		T	W		L		T
No. 4 Michigan $	7	–	0	–	1	9	–	2	–	1
Michigan State	6	–	1	–	1	6	–	5	–	1
Illinois	5	–	2	–	1	6	–	5	–	1
Iowa	4	–	1	–	3	6	–	4	–	3
No. 20 Indiana	5	–	3	–	0	8	–	3	–	1
Purdue	3	–	5	–	0	4	–	7	–	0
Ohio State	2	–	5	–	1	4	–	6	–	1
Northwestern	2	–	5	–	1	2	–	8	–	1
Wisconsin	1	–	7	–	0	1	–	10	–	0
Minnesota	0	–	6	–	2	2	–	7	–	2
$ – Conference champion; Rankings from AP Poll

1988 Big West Conference football standings
	Conf.					Overall
Team	W		L		T	W		L		T
Fresno State $	7	–	0	–	0	10	–	2	–	0
Cal State Fullerton	5	–	2	–	0	5	–	6	–	0
Utah State	4	–	3	–	0	4	–	7	–	0
San Jose State	4	–	3	–	0	4	–	8	–	0
UNLV	3	–	4	–	0	4	–	7	–	0
Long Beach State	3	–	4	–	0	3	–	9	–	0
Pacific (CA)	2	–	5	–	0	2	–	9	–	0
New Mexico State	0	–	7	–	0	1	–	10	–	0
$ – Conference champion

1988 Mid-American Conference football standings
	Conf.					Overall
Team	W		L		T	W		L		T
Western Michigan $	7	–	1	–	0	9	–	3	–	0
Eastern Michigan	5	–	2	–	1	6	–	3	–	1
Ball State	5	–	3	–	0	8	–	3	–	0
Central Michigan	5	–	3	–	0	7	–	4	–	0
Ohio	4	–	3	–	1	4	–	6	–	1
Toledo	4	–	4	–	0	6	–	5	–	0
Kent State	3	–	5	–	0	5	–	6	–	0
Bowling Green	1	–	6	–	1	2	–	8	–	1
Miami (OH)	0	–	7	–	1	0	–	10	–	1
$ – Conference champion

1988 Pacific-10 Conference football standings
	Conf.					Overall
Team	W		L		T	W		L		T
No. 7 USC $	8	–	0	–	0	10	–	2	–	0
No. 6 UCLA	6	–	2	–	0	10	–	2	–	0
No. 16 Washington State	5	–	3	–	0	9	–	3	–	0
Arizona	5	–	3	–	0	7	–	4	–	0
Arizona State	3	–	4	–	0	6	–	5	–	0
Washington	3	–	5	–	0	6	–	5	–	0
Oregon	3	–	5	–	0	6	–	6	–	0
Oregon State	2	–	5	–	1	4	–	6	–	1
Stanford	1	–	5	–	2	3	–	6	–	2
California	1	–	5	–	1	5	–	5	–	1
$ – Conference champion; Rankings from AP Poll

1988 Southeastern Conference football standings
	Conf.					Overall
Team	W		L		T	W		L		T
No. 19 LSU +	6	–	1	–	0	8	–	4	–	0
No. 8 Auburn +	6	–	1	–	0	10	–	2	–	0
No. 15 Georgia	5	–	2	–	0	9	–	3	–	0
No. 17 Alabama	4	–	3	–	0	9	–	3	–	0
Florida	4	–	3	–	0	7	–	5	–	0
Tennessee	3	–	4	–	0	5	–	6	–	0
Ole Miss	3	–	4	–	0	5	–	6	–	0
Kentucky	2	–	5	–	0	5	–	6	–	0
Vanderbilt	2	–	5	–	0	3	–	8	–	0
Mississippi State	0	–	7	–	0	1	–	10	–	0
+ – Conference co-champions; Rankings from AP Poll

1988 Southwest Conference football standings
	Conf.					Overall
Team	W		L		T	W		L		T
No. 12 Arkansas $	7	–	0	–	0	10	–	2	–	0
Texas A&M*	6	–	1	–	0	7	–	5	–	0
No. 18 Houston	5	–	2	–	0	9	–	3	–	0
Texas Tech	4	–	3	–	0	5	–	6	–	0
Baylor	2	–	5	–	0	6	–	5	–	0
Texas	2	–	5	–	0	4	–	7	–	0
TCU	2	–	5	–	0	4	–	7	–	0
Rice	0	–	7	–	0	0	–	11	–	0
$ – Conference champion; *- Ineligible for conference championship and postseason bowl games due to NCAA sanctions.; Rankings from AP Poll

1988 Western Athletic Conference football standings
	Conf.					Overall
Team	W		L		T	W		L		T
Wyoming $	8	–	0	–	0	11	–	2	–	0
UTEP	6	–	2	–	0	10	–	3	–	0
Hawaii	5	–	3	–	0	9	–	3	–	0
BYU	5	–	3	–	0	9	–	4	–	0
Utah	4	–	4	–	0	6	–	5	–	0
Air Force	3	–	5	–	0	5	–	7	–	0
San Diego State	3	–	5	–	0	3	–	8	–	0
New Mexico	1	–	7	–	0	2	–	10	–	0
Colorado State	1	–	7	–	0	1	–	10	–	0
$ – Conference champion

1988 NCAA Division I-A independents football records
	Conf.					Overall
Team	W		L		T	W		L		T
No. 1 Notre Dame		–		–		12	–	0	–	0
No. 2 Miami (FL)		–		–		11	–	1	–	0
No. 3 Florida State		–		–		11	–	1	–	0
No. 5 West Virginia		–		–		11	–	1	–	0
Southern Miss		–		–		10	–	2	–	0
No. 13 Syracuse		–		–		10	–	2	–	0
Army		–		–		9	–	3	–	0
Louisville		–		–		8	–	3	–	0
South Carolina		–		–		8	–	4	–	0
Northern Illinois		–		–		7	–	4	–	0
Pittsburgh		–		–		6	–	5	–	0
Memphis State		–		–		6	–	5	–	0
Southwestern Louisiana		–		–		6	–	5	–	0
Rutgers		–		–		5	–	6	–	0
Akron		–		–		5	–	6	–	0
Penn State		–		–		5	–	6	–	0
Tulane		–		–		5	–	6	–	0
Temple		–		–		4	–	7	–	0
Tulsa		–		–		4	–	7	–	0
Boston College		–		–		3	–	8	–	0
Cincinnati		–		–		3	–	8	–	0
East Carolina		–		–		3	–	8	–	0
Navy		–		–		3	–	8	–	0
Virginia Tech		–		–		3	–	8	–	0
Rankings from AP Poll

== I-AA team wins over I-A teams ==
Italics denotes I-AA teams.

Date	Visiting team	Home team	Site	Result	Attendance	Ref.
September 3	Boise State	Long Beach State	Veterans Memorial Stadium • Long Beach, California	29–10	6,032	
September 3	North Texas	Texas Tech	Jones Stadium • Lubbock, Texas	29–24	26,424	
September 10	Ohio	No. 10 (I-AA) Marshall	Fairfield Stadium • Huntington, West Virginia (Battle for the Bell)	14–31		
September 17	No. 9 (I-AA) Idaho	Pacific (CA)	Pacific Memorial Stadium • Stockton, California	36–26	13,868	
September 17	Toledo	McNeese State	Cowboy Stadium • Lake Charles, Louisiana	19–46	19,750	
September 24	Navy	The Citadel	Johnson Hagood Stadium • Charleston, South Carolina	35–42	20,754	
October 1	Louisiana Tech	Kansas State	KSU Stadium • Manhattan, Kansas	31–28	24,000	
October 8	Arkansas State	Akron	Rubber Bowl • Akron, Ohio	13–12	9,463	
November 19	Arkansas State	Southwestern Louisiana	Cajun Field • Lafayette, Louisiana	38–21	16,718	
November 19	No. 12 (I-AA) North Texas	Rice	Rice Stadium • Houston, Texas	33–17	8,500	
^{#}Rankings from AP Poll released prior to game.

Note: Appalachian State at Wake Forest tied 34–34.

== Season summary ==
=== September ===
The first AP Poll of the year led off with No. 1 Florida State, No. 2 Nebraska, No. 3 Oklahoma, No. 4 Clemson, and No. 5 UCLA. Nebraska defeated No. 10 Texas A&M in the Kickoff Classic on August 27, and the top five teams remained the same going into September.

September 3: No. 1 Florida State opened against No. 6 Miami. The Hurricanes had won the previous year’s matchup by a single point, but this year they were far more dominant, shutting out the Seminoles 31-0. No. 2 Nebraska defeated Utah State 63-13, while No. 3 Oklahoma was idle. No. 4 Clemson beat Virginia Tech 40-7, and No. 5 UCLA won 59-6 over San Diego State. The top five in the next poll were No. 1 Miami, No. 2 Nebraska, No. 3 Clemson, No. 4 Oklahoma, and No. 5 UCLA.

September 10: No. 1 Miami was idle. No. 2 Nebraska visited No. 5 UCLA, and the Bruins prevailed 41-28. No. 3 Clemson defeated Furman 23-3, No. 4 Oklahoma opened with a 28-0 shutout of North Carolina, and No. 6 USC won 24-20 at Stanford. The top five in the next poll were No. 1 Miami, No. 2 UCLA, No. 3 Clemson, No. 4 Oklahoma, and No. 5 USC.

September 17: No. 1 Miami made a furious comeback, scoring two touchdowns and a field goal in the last five and a half minutes to defeat No. 15 Michigan 31-30. No. 2 UCLA overwhelmed Long Beach State 56-3. No. 3 Clemson lost 24-21 to No. 10 Florida State on a “puntrooskie,” a fake punt which set up a 78-yard run and a game-winning field goal for the Seminoles. No. 4 Oklahoma beat Arizona 28-10, No. 5 USC was idle, and No. 6 Auburn won 56-7 over Kansas. The next poll featured No. 1 Miami, No. 2 UCLA, No. 3 Oklahoma, No. 4 Auburn, and No. 5 USC.

September 24: No. 1 Miami played another Big Ten opponent and had a much easier time, defeating Wisconsin 23-3. No. 2 UCLA was idle, while No. 3 Oklahoma lost 23-7 at No. 5 USC. No. 4 Auburn beat Tennessee 38-6, and No. 8 Notre Dame crushed Purdue 52-7. With losses by the sixth- and seventh-ranked teams, the Irish moved into the top five: No. 1 Miami, No. 2 UCLA, No. 3 USC, No. 4 Auburn, and No. 5 Notre Dame.

=== October ===
October 1: No. 1 Miami blew out Missouri 55-0. No. 2 UCLA won 24-17 at No. 16 Washington, and conference rival No. 3 USC visited Arizona for a 38-15 victory. No. 4 Auburn defeated North Carolina 47-21, and No. 5 Notre Dame beat Stanford 42-14. The top five remained the same in the next poll.

October 8: No. 1 Miami was idle. No. 2 UCLA beat Oregon State 38-21, and No. 3 USC defeated No. 18 Oregon 42-14. In the famous “Earthquake Game,” No. 4 Auburn held a 6-0 lead over LSU near the end of the fourth quarter. But LSU quarterback Tommy Hodson led a late drive which culminated in a touchdown pass for a 7-6 victory, and the crowd cheered so loudly that the noise registered as an earthquake at a nearby laboratory. No. 5 Notre Dame won 30-20 at Pittsburgh, and No. 6 Florida State beat Georgia Southern 28-10. The top five in the next poll were No. 1 Miami, No. 2 UCLA, No. 3 USC, No. 4 Notre Dame, and No. 5 Florida State.

October 15: This week featured one of the most iconic football games of all time as No. 1 Miami, who had not lost a regular-season game since September 1985, matched up with No. 4 Notre Dame, a traditional power enjoying their best season in several years. The contrast between the buttoned-up Fighting Irish and the flashy Hurricanes was played up as a clash of “Catholics vs. Convicts.” The game turned on a disputed fumble call midway through the fourth quarter, as Miami lost the ball at the Notre Dame one-yard line while they were trailing by just seven points, costing the Hurricanes the chance to tie or take the lead. Miami did score a touchdown with 45 seconds left to cut the score to 31-30, but a failed two-point conversion ensured a win for the Irish. No. 2 UCLA won 38-21 at California, and No. 3 USC beat No. 16 Washington 28-27 in another game which was decided on an unsuccessful two-point attempt. No. 5 Florida State defeated East Carolina 45-21, but still fell out of the top five in the next poll. No. 7 Nebraska, who won 63-42 over No. 10 Oklahoma State, moved up: No. 1 UCLA, No. 2 Notre Dame, No. 3 USC, No. 4 Miami, and No. 5 Nebraska.

October 22: No. 1 UCLA won 24-3 at Arizona, No. 2 Notre Dame beat Air Force 41-13, No. 3 USC was idle, No. 4 Miami crushed Cincinnati 57-3, and No. 5 Nebraska visited Kansas State for a 48-3 win. The top five remained the same in the next poll.

October 29: No. 1 UCLA led Washington State by 21 points in the second half, but the Cougars came all the way back to take the lead. A last-minute UCLA drive was halted at WSU’s six-yard line, and Washington State was the winner in a 34-30 upset. No. 2 Notre Dame defeated Navy 22-7, No. 3 USC won 41-20 at Oregon State, and No. 4 Miami beat East Carolina 31-7. No. 5 Nebraska posted an unimpressive win over Missouri, gaining just one first down in the first half before coming back for a 26-18 victory. No. 6 Florida State (idle this week) and No. 7 West Virginia (beat Penn State 51-30) moved ahead of the Cornhuskers in the next poll: No. 1 Notre Dame, No. 2 USC, No. 3 Miami, No. 4 West Virginia, and No. 5 Florida State.

=== November–December ===
November 5: All of the top-ranked teams dominated their opponents by 30 points or more. No. 1 Notre Dame defeated Rice 54-11, No. 2 USC beat California 35-3, No. 3 Miami was a 34-3 victor over Tulsa, No. 4 West Virginia won 51-13 at Cincinnati, and No. 5 Florida State shut out No. 15 South Carolina 59-0. The top five remained the same in the next poll.

November 12: No. 1 Notre Dame and No. 3 Miami were idle. No. 2 USC blanked Arizona State 50-0, No. 4 West Virginia won 35-25 at Rutgers, and No. 5 Florida State beat Virginia Tech 41-14. A few conference races were decided this weekend: No. 11 Arkansas defeated Texas A&M 25-20 to win the SWC title and a Cotton Bowl berth, while No. 13 Michigan clinched the Big Ten championship and a Rose Bowl appearance by beating Illinois 38-9. The top five again remained the same in the next poll.

November 19: No. 1 Notre Dame defeated Penn State 21-3. No. 2 USC visited No. 6 UCLA with the Pac-10 title and a spot in the Rose Bowl on the line. Battling a case of the measles, USC quarterback Rodney Peete led the Trojans to a 31-22 victory over Troy Aikman and the Bruins. No. 3 Miami won 44-3 at No. 11 LSU, No. 4 West Virginia finished an undefeated regular season with a 31-9 win over No. 14 Syracuse, and No. 5 Florida State was idle. As was customary in the 1980s, the Big 8 title came down to a meeting between No. 7 Nebraska and No. 9 Oklahoma. The Cornhuskers won a 7-3 defensive struggle (their first victory over the Sooners in five years) to earn the Orange Bowl berth. The top five remained the same for the third straight week.

November 25–26: For the first time in the history of their storied rivalry, Notre Dame and USC met when both teams were undefeated and untied. Notre Dame coach Lou Holtz benched key players Ricky Watters and Tony Brooks for “repeated irresponsible tardiness,” but the No. 1-ranked Fighting Irish nevertheless had little trouble, coming away with a 27-10 victory over the No. 2 Trojans. No. 3 Miami edged No. 8 Arkansas 18-16, holding the Razorbacks to minus-14 yards of offense in the fourth quarter. No. 4 West Virginia had finished their season, and No. 5 Florida State concluded their schedule with a 52-17 defeat of Florida. The last remaining conference race was decided this weekend, as No. 7 Auburn’s 15-10 victory over No. 17 Alabama moved the Tigers into a tie for the SEC title with No. 16 LSU. Despite LSU’s head-to-head victory in the earthquake game, the Sugar Bowl organizers picked Auburn (who had a better overall record and higher ranking) to represent the conference. The next poll featured No. 1 Notre Dame, No. 2 Miami, No. 3 West Virginia, No. 4 Florida State, and No. 5 USC.

December 3: No. 2 Miami defeated Brigham Young 41-17. The other top-ranked teams had finished their schedules, and the top five remained the same in the final poll before the bowls.

The only two undefeated teams (No. 1 Notre Dame and No. 3 West Virginia) were both independents; they headed to the Fiesta Bowl, which had no conference tie-in, for a de facto national championship game. Fellow independents No. 2 Miami (whose only loss was to Notre Dame) and No. 4 Florida State (whose only loss was to Miami) would respectively play No. 6 Nebraska in the Orange Bowl and No. 7 Auburn in the Sugar Bowl. No. 5 USC (whose only loss was also to Notre Dame) met No. 11 Michigan in the Rose Bowl, while No. 8 Arkansas and No. 9 UCLA matched up in the Cotton Bowl.

=== No. 1 and No. 2 progress ===
WEEKS	No. 1	No. 2	Event	
PRE	Florida State	Nebraska	Miami 31, Florida St. 0	Sep 3
1	Miami	Nebraska	UCLA 41, Nebraska 28	Sep 10
2-6	Miami	UCLA	Notre Dame 31, Miami 30	Oct 15
7-8	UCLA	Notre Dame	Washington St. 34, UCLA 30	Oct 29
9-12	Notre Dame	USC	Notre Dame 27, USC 10	Nov 26
13-14	Notre Dame	Miami	Notre Dame 34, West Virginia 21	Jan 1

=== Bowl games ===
National championship:

- Fiesta Bowl: No. 1 Notre Dame 34, No. 3 West Virginia 21

January 2 bowl games:

- Orange Bowl: No. 2 Miami (FL) 23, No. 6 Nebraska 3
- Sugar Bowl: No. 4 Florida State 13, No. 7 Auburn 7
- Rose Bowl: No. 11 Michigan 22, No. 5 USC 14
- Cotton Bowl: No. 9 UCLA 17, No. 8 Arkansas 3
- Florida Citrus Bowl: No. 13 Clemson 13, No. 10 Oklahoma 6
- Hall of Fame Bowl: No. 17 Syracuse 23, No. 16 LSU 10

Other Bowls:

- Gator Bowl: No. 19 Georgia 34, Michigan State 27
- Sun Bowl: No. 20 Alabama 29, Army 28
- Holiday Bowl: No. 12 Oklahoma State 62, No. 15 Wyoming 14
- Freedom Bowl: BYU 20, Colorado 17
- Peach Bowl: NC State 28, Iowa 23
- All-American Bowl: Florida 14, Illinois 10
- Liberty Bowl: Indiana 34, South Carolina 10
- Aloha Bowl: No. 18 Washington State 24, No. 14 Houston 22
- Independence Bowl: Southern Miss 38, UTEP 18
- California Bowl: Fresno State 35, Western Michigan 30

== Polls ==
=== Final AP Poll ===
1. Notre Dame
2. Miami (FL)
3. Florida State
4. Michigan
5. West Virginia
6. UCLA
7. Southern California
8. Auburn
9. Clemson
10. Nebraska
11. Oklahoma State
12. Arkansas
13. Syracuse
14. Oklahoma
15. Georgia
16. Washington State
17. Alabama
18. Houston
19. LSU
20. Indiana

=== Final Coaches Poll ===
1. Notre Dame
2. Miami (FL)
3. Florida State
4. Michigan
5. West Virginia
6. UCLA
7. Auburn
8. Clemson
9. Southern California
10. Nebraska
11. Oklahoma State
12. Syracuse
13. Arkansas
14. Oklahoma
15. Georgia
16. Washington State
17. Alabama
18. North Carolina State
19. Indiana
20. Wyoming

== Awards ==
=== Heisman Trophy voting ===
The Heisman Trophy is given to the year's most outstanding player

Player	School	Position	1st	2nd	3rd	Total
Barry Sanders	Oklahoma State	RB	559	77	47	1,878
Rodney Peete	USC	QB	70	264	174	912
Troy Aikman	UCLA	QB	31	149	191	582
Steve Walsh	Miami (FL)	QB	16	108	77	341
Major Harris	West Virginia	QB	27	60	79	280
Tony Mandarich	Michigan State	OT	3	9	25	52
Timm Rosenbach	Washington State	QB	6	6	14	44
Deion Sanders	Florida State	CB	0	3	16	22
Anthony Thompson	Indiana	RB	0	4	13	21
Derrick Thomas	Alabama	LB	3	2	7	20

=== Other major awards ===
- Maxwell (Player): Barry Sanders, Oklahoma State
- Camp (Back): Barry Sanders, Oklahoma State
- Davey O'Brien Award (QB): Troy Aikman, UCLA
- Rockne (Lineman): N/A
- Lombardi (Linebacker): Tracy Rocker, Auburn
- Outland (Interior): Tracy Rocker, Auburn
- Coach of the Year: Don Nehlen, West Virginia

== Attendances ==
Average home attendance top 3:

Rank	Team	Average
1	Michigan Wolverines	104,801
2	Tennessee Volunteers	91,946
3	Ohio State Buckeyes	86,162
