= 1988–89 NCAA football bowl games =

College football postseason game series

- Season: 1988
- Number of bowls: 17
- Bowl games: December 10, 1988 – January 2, 1989
- National Championship: 1989 Fiesta Bowl
- Location of Championship: Sun Devil Stadium, Tempe, Arizona
- Champions: Notre Dame Fighting Irish
Bowl record by conference
Conference	Bowls	Record	Final AP poll
Independents	8	5–3 (0.625)	5
SEC	5	3–2 (0.600)	4
Big Ten	5	2–3 (0.400)	2
Big Eight	4	1–3 (0.250)	3
Pac-10	3	2–1 (0.667)	3
WAC	3	1–2 (0.333)	0
ACC	2	2–0 (1.000)	1
SWC	2	0–2 (0.000)	2
Big West	1	1–0 (1.000)	0
MAC	1	0–1 (0.000)	0

The 1988–89 NCAA football bowl games were a series of post-season games played in December 1988 and January 1989 to end the 1988 NCAA Division I-A football season. A total of 17 team-competitive games, and two all-star games, were played. The post-season began with the California Bowl on December 10, 1988, and concluded on January 21, 1989, with the season-ending Senior Bowl.

== Schedule ==
Date	Game	Site	Time (US EST)	TV	Matchup (pre-game record)	AP pre-game rank	UPI (Coaches) pre-game rank
12/10	California Bowl	Bulldog Stadium; Fresno, California			Fresno State 35 (9–2) (Big West Champion), Western Michigan 30 (9–2) (MAC Champion)	NR; NR	NR; NR
12/23	Independence Bowl	Independence Stadium; Shreveport, Louisiana		Mizlou	Southern Miss 38 (9–2) (Independent), UTEP 18 (10–2) (WAC)	NR; NR	NR; NR
12/24	Sun Bowl	Sun Bowl; El Paso, Texas		CBS	Alabama 29 (8–3) (SEC), Army 28 (9–2) (Independent)	#20; NR	#20; NR
12/25	Aloha Bowl	Aloha Stadium; Honolulu, Hawaii		ABC	Washington State 24 (8–3) (Pac-10), Houston 22 (9–2) (SWC)	#18 #14	#18 #14
12/28	Liberty Bowl	Liberty Bowl Memorial Stadium; Memphis, Tennessee		Raycom	Indiana 34 (7–3–1) (Big Ten), South Carolina 10 (8–3) (Independent)	NR; NR	NR; NR
12/29	Freedom Bowl	Anaheim Stadium; Anaheim, California		Mizlou	BYU 20 (8–4) (WAC), Colorado 17 (8–3) (Big Eight)	NR; NR	NR #20
12/29	All-American Bowl	Legion Field; Birmingham, Alabama		ESPN	Florida 14 (6–5) (SEC), Illinois 10 (6–4–1) (Big Ten)	NR; NR	NR; NR
12/30	Holiday Bowl	Jack Murphy Stadium; San Diego, California		ESPN	Oklahoma State 62 (9–2) (Big Eight), Wyoming 14 (11–1) (WAC Champion)	#12 #15	#12 #15
12/31	Peach Bowl	Fulton County Stadium; Atlanta		Mizlou	NC State 28 (7–3–1) (ACC), Iowa 23 (6–3–3) (Big Ten)	NR; NR	NR; NR
1/1	Gator Bowl	Gator Bowl Stadium; Jacksonville, Florida		ESPN	Georgia 34 (8–3) (SEC), Michigan State 27 (6–4–1) (Big Ten)	#19; NR	#19; NR
1/2	Hall of Fame Bowl	Tampa Stadium; Tampa, Florida	1 PM	NBC	Syracuse 23 (9–2) (Independent), LSU 10 (8–3) (SEC)	#17 #16	#16 #17
1/2	Florida Citrus Bowl	Florida Citrus Bowl; Orlando, Florida	1:30 PM	ABC	Clemson 13 (9–2) (ACC Champion), Oklahoma 6 (9–2) (Big Eight)	#13 #10	#13 #10
1/2	Cotton Bowl Classic	Cotton Bowl; Dallas, Texas	1:30 PM	CBS	UCLA 17 (9–2) (Pac-10), Arkansas 3 (10–1) (SWC Champion)	#9 #8	#9 #8
1/2	Fiesta Bowl	Sun Devil Stadium; Tempe, Arizona	4:30 PM	NBC	Notre Dame 34 (11–0) (Independent), West Virginia 21 (11–0) (Independent)	#1 #3	#1 #3
1/2	Rose Bowl	Rose Bowl; Pasadena, California	5 PM	ABC	Michigan 22 (8–2–1) (Big Ten Champion), USC 14 (10–1) (Pac-10 Champion)	#11 #5	#11 #5
1/2	Orange Bowl	Miami Orange Bowl; Miami	8:00 PM	NBC	Miami (FL) 23 (10–1) (Independent), Nebraska 3 (11–1) (Big Eight Champion)	#2 #6	#2 #6
1/2	Sugar Bowl	Louisiana Superdome; New Orleans, Louisiana	8:30 PM	ABC	Florida State 13 (10–1) (Independent), Auburn 7 (10–1) (SEC co-Champion)	#4 #7	#4 #7
