= 1988 Virginia Cavaliers football team =

American college football season

1988 Virginia Cavaliers football
- Conference: Atlantic Coast Conference
- Record: 7–4 (5–2 ACC)
- Head coach: George Welsh (7th season)
- Offensive coordinator: Gary Tranquill (2nd season)
- Defensive coordinator: Frank Spaziani (2nd season)
- Captains: Roy Brown; David Griggs; Jeff Lageman
- Home stadium: Scott Stadium

1988 Atlantic Coast Conference football standings
	Conf.					Overall
Team	W		L		T	W		L		T
No. 9 Clemson $	6	–	1	–	0	10	–	2	–	0
Virginia	5	–	2	–	0	7	–	4	–	0
NC State	4	–	2	–	1	8	–	3	–	1
Wake Forest	4	–	3	–	0	6	–	4	–	1
Maryland	4	–	3	–	0	5	–	6	–	0
Duke	3	–	3	–	1	7	–	3	–	1
North Carolina	1	–	6	–	0	1	–	10	–	0
Georgia Tech	0	–	7	–	0	3	–	8	–	0
$ – Conference champion; Rankings from AP Poll

The 1988 Virginia Cavaliers football team represented the University of Virginia during the 1988 NCAA Division I-A football season. The Cavaliers were led by seventh-year head coach George Welsh and played their home games at Scott Stadium in Charlottesville, Virginia. They competed as members of the Atlantic Coast Conference, finishing in second.

== Schedule ==
Date	Time	Opponent	Site	TV	Result	Attendance	Source
September 3	7:00 p.m.	William & Mary*	Scott Stadium; Charlottesville, VA		W 31–23	32,000	
September 10	7:00 p.m.	No. 18 Penn State*	Scott Stadium; Charlottesville, VA		L 14–42	45,000	
September 17	12:00 p.m.	Georgia Tech	Scott Stadium; Charlottesville, VA	JPS	W 17–16	24,800	
September 24	12:00 p.m.	at Duke	Wallace Wade Stadium; Durham, NC	JPS	L 34–38	20,200	
October 8	1:00 p.m.	No. 11 Clemson^{†}	Scott Stadium; Charlottesville, VA		L 7–10	42,000	
October 15	4:00 p.m.	at Louisville*	Cardinal Stadium; Louisville, KY		L 28–30	30,142	
October 22	12:00 p.m.	at Wake Forest	Groves Stadium; Winston-Salem, NC	JPS	W 34–14	21,300	
October 29	1:00 p.m.	at Virginia Tech*	Lane Stadium; Blacksburg, VA (rivalry)		W 16–10	50,329	
November 5	1:00 p.m.	NC State	Scott Stadium; Charlottesville, VA		W 19–14	31,600	
November 12	2:00 p.m.	at North Carolina	Kenan Memorial Stadium; Chapel Hill, NC (South's Oldest Rivalry)		W 27–24	45,000	
November 19	12:00 p.m.	Maryland	Scott Stadium; Charlottesville, VA (rivalry)	JPS	W 24–23	30,600	
*Non-conference game; ^{†}Homecoming; Rankings from AP Poll released prior to the game

== Roster ==
1988 Virginia Cavaliers football team roster
Players
Coaches
Offense

Pos.	#	Name	Class
WR	17	John Ford
QB	12	Shawn Moore

Defense

Pos.	#	Name	Class
LB	66	Jeff Lageman

Special teams

Pos.	#	Name	Class

Head coach

- George Welsh

Coordinators/assistant coaches

Legend

- (C) Team captain
- (S) Suspended
- (I) Ineligible
- Injured
- Redshirt
