= 1988 Georgia Tech Yellow Jackets football team =

American college football season

1988 Georgia Tech Yellow Jackets football
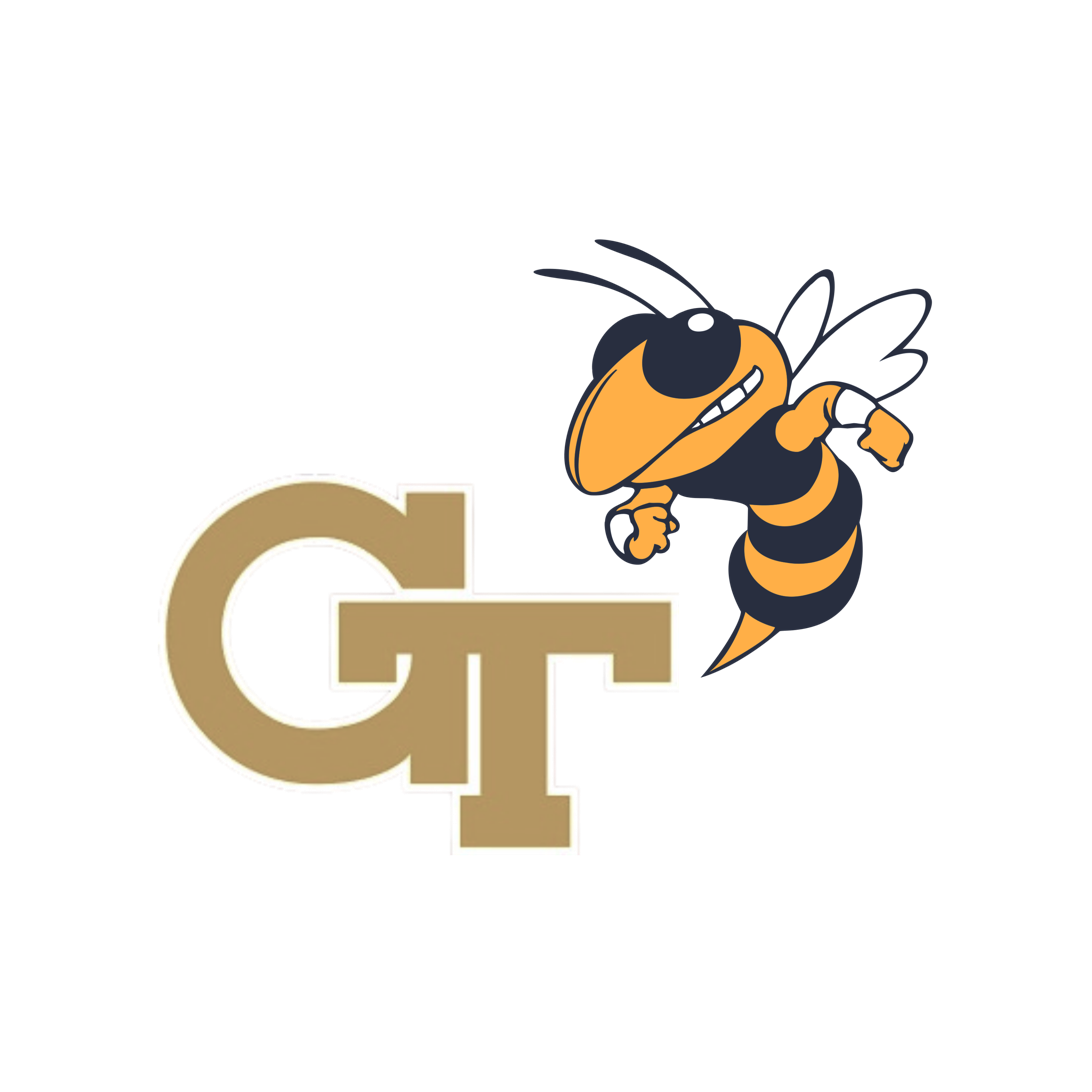
- Conference: Atlantic Coast Conference
- Record: 3–8 (0–7 ACC)
- Head coach: Bobby Ross (2nd season)
- Offensive coordinator: Ralph Friedgen (2nd season)
- Defensive coordinator: George O'Leary (2nd season)
- Captains: Eric Bearden; Cedric Stallworth
- Home stadium: Bobby Dodd Stadium

1988 Atlantic Coast Conference football standings
	Conf.					Overall
Team	W		L		T	W		L		T
No. 9 Clemson $	6	–	1	–	0	10	–	2	–	0
Virginia	5	–	2	–	0	7	–	4	–	0
NC State	4	–	2	–	1	8	–	3	–	1
Wake Forest	4	–	3	–	0	6	–	4	–	1
Maryland	4	–	3	–	0	5	–	6	–	0
Duke	3	–	3	–	1	7	–	3	–	1
North Carolina	1	–	6	–	0	1	–	10	–	0
Georgia Tech	0	–	7	–	0	3	–	8	–	0
$ – Conference champion; Rankings from AP Poll

The 1988 Georgia Tech Yellow Jackets football team represented the Georgia Institute of Technology during the 1988 NCAA Division I-A football season. The Yellow Jackets were led by second-year head coach Bobby Ross, and played their home games at Bobby Dodd Stadium in Atlanta, the first season under that name after it was renamed in honor of the legendary Georgia Tech head coach. The team competed as members of the Atlantic Coast Conference, finishing in last and failing to a win a conference game for the second consecutive season.

== Schedule ==
Date	Opponent	Site	TV	Result	Attendance	Source
September 10	Chattanooga*	Bobby Dodd Stadium; Atlanta, GA		W 24–10	22,720	
September 17	at Virginia	Scott Stadium; Charlottesville, VA	Raycom	L 16–17	24,800	
September 24	No. 12 Clemson	Bobby Dodd Stadium; Atlanta, GA (rivalry)		L 13–30	45,106	
October 1	NC State	Bobby Dodd Stadium; Atlanta, GA	Raycom	L 6–14	36,892	
October 8	at Maryland	Byrd Stadium; College Park, MD	Raycom	L 8–13	36,969	
October 15	No. 8 South Carolina*	Bobby Dodd Stadium; Atlanta, GA		W 34–0	45,103	
October 22	at North Carolina	Kenan Memorial Stadium; Chapel Hill, NC		L 17–20	42,000	
October 29	Duke^{†}	Bobby Dodd Stadium; Atlanta, GA		L 21–31	40,393	
November 5	VMI*	Bobby Dodd Stadium; Atlanta, GA		W 34–7	26,923	
November 12	at Wake Forest	Groves Stadium; Winston-Salem, NC		L 24–28	21,500	
November 26	at No. 20 Georgia*	Sanford Stadium; Athens, GA (Clean, Old-Fashioned Hate)	TBS	L 3–24	82,011	
*Non-conference game; ^{†}Homecoming; Rankings from AP Poll released prior to the game

== Roster ==
1988 Georgia Tech Yellow Jackets football team roster
Players
Coaches
Offense

Pos.	#	Name	Class
RB		Jerry Mays	Jr
OL		Mike Mooney	Fr

Defense

Pos.	#	Name	Class
DB		Ken Swilling	Fr
LB		Willis Crockett	Sr
DE		Sean Smith	Jr
DB		Willie Clay	Fr
DB		Mike MacIntyre

Special teams

Pos.	#	Name	Class

Head coach

- Bobby Ross

Coordinators/assistant coaches

- Ralph Friedgen – Offensive coordinator/quarterbacks
- Danny Smith – Running backs
- Jimmy Robinson – Wide receivers
- Mark Hendrickson – Tight ends/special teams
- Pat Watson – Offensive line
- George O'Leary – Defensive coordinator/defensive line
- Brian Baker – Outside linebacker
- Charlie Rizzo – Inside linebackers
- Chuck Priefer – Defensive backs

Legend

- (C) Team captain
- (S) Suspended
- (I) Ineligible
- Injured
- Redshirt
