= 1988 Maryland Terrapins football team =

American college football season

1988 Maryland Terrapins football
- Conference: Atlantic Coast Conference
- Record: 5–6 (4–3 ACC)
- Head coach: Joe Krivak (2nd season)
- Offensive coordinator: Bob Valesente (1st season)
- Defensive coordinator: Greg Williams (2nd season)
- Home stadium: Byrd Stadium

1988 Atlantic Coast Conference football standings
	Conf.					Overall
Team	W		L		T	W		L		T
No. 9 Clemson $	6	–	1	–	0	10	–	2	–	0
Virginia	5	–	2	–	0	7	–	4	–	0
NC State	4	–	2	–	1	8	–	3	–	1
Wake Forest	4	–	3	–	0	6	–	4	–	1
Maryland	4	–	3	–	0	5	–	6	–	0
Duke	3	–	3	–	1	7	–	3	–	1
North Carolina	1	–	6	–	0	1	–	10	–	0
Georgia Tech	0	–	7	–	0	3	–	8	–	0
$ – Conference champion; Rankings from AP Poll

The 1988 Maryland Terrapins football team represented the University of Maryland in the 1988 NCAA Division I-A football season. In their second season under head coach Joe Krivak, the Terrapins compiled a 5–6 record, finished in fifth place in the Atlantic Coast Conference, and were outscored by their opponents 304 to 260. The team's statistical leaders included Neil O'Donnell with 1,973 passing yards, Ricky Johnson with 635 rushing yards, and Vernon Joines with 433 receiving yards.

== Schedule ==
Date	Opponent	Site	Result	Attendance	Source
September 3	Louisville*	Byrd Stadium; College Park, MD	W 27–16	30,457	
September 17	at No. 12 West Virginia*	Mountaineer Field; Morgantown, WV (rivalry)	L 24–55	60,188	
September 24	NC State	Byrd Stadium; College Park, MD	W 30–26	32,291	
October 1	at Syracuse*	Carrier Dome; Syracuse, NY	L 9–20	45,197	
October 8	Georgia Tech	Byrd Stadium; College Park, MD	W 13–8	36,969	
October 15	Wake Forest	Byrd Stadium; College Park, MD	L 24–27	41,278	
October 22	at Duke	Wallace Wade Stadium; Durham, NC	W 34–24	23,800	
October 29	at North Carolina	Kenan Memorial Stadium; Chapel Hill, NC	W 41–38	45,000	
November 5	at Penn State*	Beaver Stadium; University Park, PA (rivalry)	L 10–17	78,000	
November 12	No. 16 Clemson	Byrd Stadium; College Park, MD	L 25–49	45,000	
November 19	at Virginia	Scott Stadium; Charlottesville, VA (rivalry)	L 23–24	30,600	
*Non-conference game; Rankings from AP Poll released prior to the game

== Roster ==
1988 Maryland Terrapins football team roster
Players
Coaches
Offense

Pos.	#	Name	Class
OT	74	Clarence Jones	Jr
QB	14	Neil O'Donnell	Jr
QB	13	Scott Zolak	So

Defense

Pos.	#	Name	Class
DB	4	J. B. Brown	Sr
DT	90	Warren Powers	Sr

Special teams

Pos.	#	Name	Class

Head coach

- Joe Krivak

Coordinators/assistant coaches

Legend

- (C) Team captain
- (S) Suspended
- (I) Ineligible
- Injured
- Redshirt
