= 1988 Wake Forest Demon Deacons football team =

American college football season

1988 Wake Forest Demon Deacons football
- Conference: Atlantic Coast Conference
- Record: 6–4–1 (4–3 ACC)
- Head coach: Bill Dooley (2nd season)
- Defensive coordinator: Bob Pruett (4th season)
- Captains: Mike Elkins; Ernie Purnsley
- Home stadium: Groves Stadium

1988 Atlantic Coast Conference football standings
	Conf.					Overall
Team	W		L		T	W		L		T
No. 9 Clemson $	6	–	1	–	0	10	–	2	–	0
Virginia	5	–	2	–	0	7	–	4	–	0
NC State	4	–	2	–	1	8	–	3	–	1
Wake Forest	4	–	3	–	0	6	–	4	–	1
Maryland	4	–	3	–	0	5	–	6	–	0
Duke	3	–	3	–	1	7	–	3	–	1
North Carolina	1	–	6	–	0	1	–	10	–	0
Georgia Tech	0	–	7	–	0	3	–	8	–	0
$ – Conference champion; Rankings from AP Poll

The 1988 Wake Forest Demon Deacons football team was an American football team that represented Wake Forest University during the 1988 NCAA Division I-A football season. In its second season under head coach Bill Dooley, the team compiled a 6–4–1 record and finished in a tie for fourth place in the Atlantic Coast Conference.

== Schedule ==
Date	Opponent	Site	Result	Attendance	Source
September 3	at Villanova*	Villanova Stadium; Villanova, PA	W 31–11	11,624	
September 10	Illinois State*	Groves Stadium; Winston-Salem, NC	W 35–0	20,225	
September 17	at NC State	Carter–Finley Stadium; Raleigh, NC (rivalry)	L 6–14	48,000	
September 24	at No. 19 Michigan*	Michigan Stadium; Ann Arbor, MI	L 9–19	102,776	
October 8	North Carolina	Groves Stadium; Winston-Salem, NC (rivalry)	W 42–24	33,500	
October 15	at Maryland	Byrd Stadium; College Park, MD	W 27–24	41,278	
October 22	Virginia	Groves Stadium; Winston-Salem, NC	L 14–34	21,300	
October 29	No. 15 Clemson	Groves Stadium; Winston-Salem, NC	L 21–38	27,300	
November 5	at Duke	Wallace Wade Stadium; Durham, NC (rivalry)	W 35–16	35,500	
November 12	Georgia Tech	Groves Stadium; Winston-Salem, NC	W 28–24	21,500	
November 19	Appalachian State*	Groves Stadium; Winston-Salem, NC	T 34–34	21,050	
*Non-conference game; Rankings from AP Poll released prior to the game

== Roster ==
1988 Wake Forest Demon Deacons football team roster
Players
Coaches
Offense

Pos.	#	Name	Class
QB	10	Mike Elkins	Sr
WR	88	Ricky Proehl	Jr

Defense

Pos.	#	Name	Class
LB		David Braxton	Sr

Special teams

Pos.	#	Name	Class

Head coach

- Bill Dooley

Coordinators/assistant coaches

Legend

- (C) Team captain
- (S) Suspended
- (I) Ineligible
- Injured
- Redshirt

== Team leaders ==
Category	Team Leader	Att/Cth	Yds
Passing	Mike Elkins	165/280	2,205
Rushing	Mark Young	165	711
Receiving	Ricky Proehl	51	845

== Team players in the NFL ==
Player	Position	Round	Pick	NFL club
Mike Elkins	Quarterback	2	32	Kansas City Chiefs
David Braxton	Linebacker	2	52	Minnesota Vikings
A. J. Greene	Defensive back	9	245	New York Giants
