= 1988 TCU Horned Frogs football team =

American college football season

1988 TCU Horned Frogs football
- Conference: Southwest Conference
- Record: 4–7 (2–5 SWC)
- Head coach: Jim Wacker (6th season)
- Home stadium: Amon G. Carter Stadium

1988 Southwest Conference football standings
	Conf.					Overall
Team	W		L		T	W		L		T
No. 12 Arkansas $	7	–	0	–	0	10	–	2	–	0
Texas A&M*	6	–	1	–	0	7	–	5	–	0
No. 18 Houston	5	–	2	–	0	9	–	3	–	0
Texas Tech	4	–	3	–	0	5	–	6	–	0
Baylor	2	–	5	–	0	6	–	5	–	0
Texas	2	–	5	–	0	4	–	7	–	0
TCU	2	–	5	–	0	4	–	7	–	0
Rice	0	–	7	–	0	0	–	11	–	0
$ – Conference champion; *- Ineligible for conference championship and postseason bowl games due to NCAA sanctions.; Rankings from AP Poll

The 1988 TCU Horned Frogs football team represented Texas Christian University (TCU) in the 1988 NCAA Division I-A football season. The Horned Frogs finished the season 4–7 overall and 2–6 in the Southwest Conference. The team was coached by Jim Wacker, in his sixth year as head coach. The Frogs played their home games in Amon G. Carter Stadium, which is located on campus in Fort Worth, Texas.

== Schedule ==
Date	Time	Opponent	Site	TV	Result	Attendance	Source
September 10		at No. 8 Georgia*	Sanford Stadium; Athens, GA		L 10–38	72,680	
September 17		Bowling Green*	Amon G. Carter Stadium; Fort Worth, TX		W 49–12	18,706	
September 24		Boston College*	Amon G. Carter Stadium; Fort Worth, TX		W 31–17	25,335	
October 1		at Arkansas	Razorback Stadium; Fayetteville, AR		L 10–53	41,240	
October 8		Rice	Amon G. Carter Stadium; Fort Worth, TX		W 21–10	25,102	
October 15		at BYU*	Cougar Stadium; Provo, UT		L 18–31	64,103	
October 22		Baylor	Amon G. Carter Stadium; Fort Worth, TX (rivalry)		W 24–14	25,221	
October 29		at Houston	Houston Astrodome; Houston, TX		L 12–40	15,582	
November 5	1:30 p.m.	Texas Tech	Amon G. Carter Stadium; Fort Worth, TX (rivalry)		L 10–23	29,362	
November 12	12:00 p.m.	Texas	Amon G. Carter Stadium; Fort Worth, TX (rivalry)	Raycom	L 21–30	29,083	
November 19		at Texas A&M	Kyle Field; College Station, TX (rivalry)	Raycom	L 0–18	52,969	
*Non-conference game; Rankings from AP Poll released prior to the game; All times are in Central time

== Roster ==
1988 TCU Horned Frogs football team roster
Players
Coaches
Offense

Pos.	#	Name	Class
WR	5	Scott Ankrom	Sr
FB	9	Scott Bednarski	Sr
TE	89	Kelly Blackwell	Fr
QB	17	David Rascoe	Sr

Defense

Pos.	#	Name	Class
DT	95	Mitchell Benson	Sr
FS	1	Falanda Newton	Sr
LB	56	Tracy Simien	Sr
DT	47	Fred Washington	Jr

Special teams

Pos.	#	Name	Class
P	7	Chris Becker	Sr

Head coach

- Jim Wacker

Coordinators/assistant coaches

Legend

- (C) Team captain
- (S) Suspended
- (I) Ineligible
- Injured
- Redshirt
