= 1988 Texas Tech Red Raiders football team =

American college football season

1988 Texas Tech Red Raiders football
- Conference: Southwest Conference
- Record: 5–6 (4–3 SWC)
- Head coach: Spike Dykes (2nd season)
- Offensive coordinator: Dick Winder (2nd season)
- Offensive scheme: No-huddle spread
- Defensive coordinator: Carlos Mainord (2nd season)
- Base defense: 3–4
- Home stadium: Jones Stadium

1988 Southwest Conference football standings
	Conf.					Overall
Team	W		L		T	W		L		T
No. 12 Arkansas $	7	–	0	–	0	10	–	2	–	0
Texas A&M*	6	–	1	–	0	7	–	5	–	0
No. 18 Houston	5	–	2	–	0	9	–	3	–	0
Texas Tech	4	–	3	–	0	5	–	6	–	0
Baylor	2	–	5	–	0	6	–	5	–	0
Texas	2	–	5	–	0	4	–	7	–	0
TCU	2	–	5	–	0	4	–	7	–	0
Rice	0	–	7	–	0	0	–	11	–	0
$ – Conference champion; *- Ineligible for conference championship and postseason bowl games due to NCAA sanctions.; Rankings from AP Poll

The 1988 Texas Tech Red Raiders football team represented Texas Tech University as a member of the Southwest Conference (SWC) during the 1988 NCAA Division I-A football season. In their second season under head coach Spike Dykes, the Red Raiders compiled a 5–6 record (4–3 against SWC opponents), finished in fourth place in the conference, and were outscored by opponents by a combined total of 332 to 328. The team played its home games at Clifford B. and Audrey Jones Stadium in Lubbock, Texas.

== Schedule ==
Date	Time	Opponent	Site	TV	Result	Attendance	Source
September 3	7:00 pm	North Texas*	Jones Stadium; Lubbock, TX		L 24–29	26,424	
September 10	10:00 pm	at Arizona*	Arizona Stadium; Tucson, AZ (rivalry)		L 19–35	46,334	
September 24	7:00 pm	Baylor^{†}	Jones Stadium; Lubbock, TX (rivalry)		W 36–6	45,385	
October 1	1:30 pm	at Texas A&M	Kyle Field; College Station, TX (rivalry)		L 15–50	63,822	
October 8	12:00 pm	at No. 20 Arkansas	War Memorial Stadium; Little Rock, AR (rivalry)	Raycom	L 10–31	49,818	
October 15	12:00 pm	at Rice	Rice Stadium; Houston, TX	Raycom	W 38–36	10,500	
October 29	12:00 pm	Texas	Jones Stadium; Lubbock, TX (rivalry)	Raycom	W 33–32	49,682	
November 5	1:30 pm	at TCU	Amon G. Carter Stadium; Fort Worth, TX (rivalry)		W 23–10	29,362	
November 12	1:00 pm	Lamar*	Jones Stadium; Lubbock, TX		W 59–28	30,319	
November 19	1:00 pm	No. 17 Houston	Jones Stadium; Lubbock, TX (rivalry)		L 29–30	27,204	
December 4	10:00 pm	vs. No. 12 Oklahoma State*	Tokyo Dome; Tokyo, Japan (Coca-Cola Classic)	CBS	L 42–45	56,000	
*Non-conference game; ^{†}Homecoming; Rankings from AP Poll released prior to the game; All times are in Central time

== Roster ==
- QB Billy Joe Tolliver
- DT Ronnie Gossett
