= 1989 Sugar Bowl =

1989 USF&G Sugar Bowl
- 55th Sugar Bowl
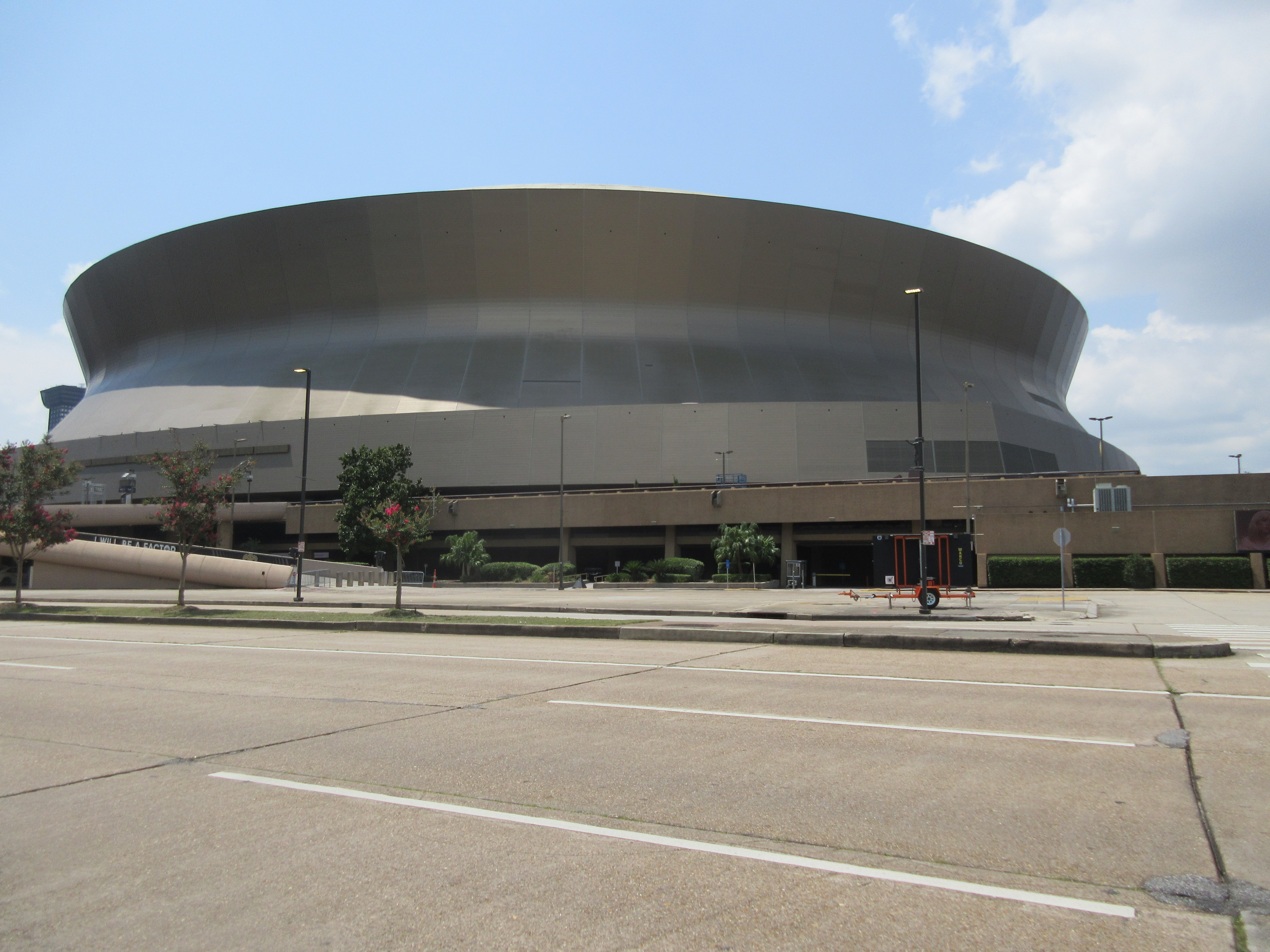
- The Louisiana Superdome in New Orleans, Louisiana, hosted the Sugar Bowl.
Florida State Seminoles	Auburn Tigers
(10–1)	(10–1)
Independent	SEC
13	7
Head coach: Bobby Bowden	Head coach: Pat Dye
AP / Coaches; 4 / 4	AP / Coaches; 7 / 7
	1	2	3	4	Total
Florida State	10	3	0	0	13
Auburn	0	7	0	0	7
- Date: January 2, 1989
- Season: 1988
- Stadium: Louisiana Superdome
- Location: New Orleans, Louisiana
- MVP: Sammie Smith (FSU RB)
- Favorite: Florida State by 5½ points
- Referee: John Soffey (CIFOA)
- Attendance: 61,934

United States TV coverage
- Network: ABC
- Announcers: Al Michaels, Frank Gifford, and Dan Dierdorf

The 1989 Sugar Bowl was the 55th edition of the college football bowl game, played at the Louisiana Superdome in New Orleans, Louisiana, on Monday, January 2. Part of the 1988–89 bowl game season, it featured the fourth-ranked independent Florida State Seminoles and the #7 Auburn Tigers of the Southeastern Conference (SEC). Favored Florida State won the defensive slugfest, 13–7.

Sponsored by the USF&G insurance company, the game was officially known as the USF&G Sugar Bowl. New Year's Day was on Sunday in 1989, and the college bowl games were played the following day.

== Teams ==
Both teams entered the game with one loss.

=== Florida State ===
The Seminoles opened the season ranked first, but were shut out 31–0 at Miami in the opener and fell to tenth in the AP poll. They won the remainder of their games.

=== Auburn ===
The Tigers' only loss was by a point at LSU on October 8, and they fell from fourth to twelfth in the AP poll.

Auburn and LSU shared the SEC championship with 6–1 conference records. Auburn was awarded the Sugar Bowl berth by a vote of the bowl's executive committee despite losing to LSU and playing in the game the previous year (LSU played in the bowl following the 1984 and 1986 seasons, losing each to Nebraska).

Two late season events boosted Auburn's Sugar Bowl case: (a) LSU's 44–3 loss at home to Miami and (b) Auburn's 15–10 Iron Bowl victory vs. Alabama. LSU's 36-33 loss at Ohio State in September, a game which the Tigers led 33-20 with five minutes remaining, also worked against the home-state team, especially after the Buckeyes finished 5-6.

== Game summary ==
The game kicked off shortly after 7:30 p.m. CST, following the Rose Bowl on ABC, and shortly after the start of the Orange Bowl on NBC. Played on Monday night, the broadcast team in the booth was from ABC's Monday Night Football.

Florida State played well on its first offensive possession, and running back Dayne Williams capped an 84-yard drive with a two-yard touchdown run. That would mark the only touchdown Florida State would score in the game. Auburn quarterback Reggie Slack's first pass of the game was intercepted by strong safety Stan Shiver at the Auburn 44-yard line. Florida State's four-play drive ended with a 25-yard Bill Mason field goal to put the score at 10–0 Florida State.

At the end of the first quarter, Florida State defensive back Dedrick Dodge intercepted a Reggie Slack pass at the Auburn 38-yard line and the succeeding drive Mason's second field goal of the game, a 31-yarder, more than three minutes into the second quarter, which was FSU's last score of the game. With 4:09 left in the first half, Reggie Slack threw a 20-yard touchdown pass to Walter Reeves, on a playaction pass, making it Florida State 13–7, and neither team scored again.

The game was filled with several mistakes from Florida State. Running back Sammie Smith score on a 69-yard touchdown run was wiped out by a holding penalty. Despite the penalty, he would still finish the game with a game high 115 yards rushing. Florida State had first and goal at the Auburn 4-yard line, but came up empty after a fake field goal missed. These errors nearly cost Florida State the game.

With 3:30 left in the game, Auburn drove from its own 4-yard line to Florida State's 22-yard line. With five seconds left Reggie Slack's pass was intercepted in the end zone by Deion Sanders, sealing Florida State's win.

== Scoring summary ==
Scoring summary

Quarter	Time	Drive			Team	Scoring information	Score	
Quarter	Time	Plays	Yards	TOP	Team	Scoring information	FSU	AU
1		12	84	5:12	FSU	Dayne Williams 2-yard touchdown run, Andrews kick good	7	0
1		4	–1	2:21	FSU	25-yard field goal by Bill Mason	10	0
2		8	24	4:22	FSU	31-yard field goal by Bill Mason	13	0
2	4:09	7	51	2:44	AU	Walter Reeves 20-yard touchdown reception from Reggie Slack, Win Lyle kick good	13	7
"TOP" = time of possession. For other American football terms, see Glossary of American football.							13	7

== Statistics ==
Statistics	Florida State	Auburn
First downs	21	18
Rushes–yards	47–148	36–108
Passing yards	157	162
Passes	14–27–1	19–33–3
Total offense	74–305	69–270
Return yards	11	38
Punts–average	4–35.0	4–35.8
Fumbles–lost	2–1	3–2
Turnovers	2	5
Penalties–yards	6–45	5–65
Time of possession	33:35	26:25

== Aftermath ==
Florida State climbed to third in the final AP poll and Auburn remained at seventh.

The Seminoles played in the Sugar Bowl four times in six seasons between 1994 and 1999, with two of those determining national championships. FSU lost the Bowl Alliance title match vs. Florida in January 1997 and defeated Virginia Tech in the BCS final in January 2000 to clinch its second title, joining 1993.

The Tigers did not return to the Sugar Bowl until January 2005, when a victory vs. Virginia Tech completed a 13-0 season. However, Auburn was denied the national championship by USC, which also went 13-0 and demolished previously undefeated Oklahoma in the Orange Bowl, the designated BCS championship game for 2004. Auburn finally reached the summit in January 2011, defeating Oregon in the BCS Championship Game (the BCS introduced a standalone title game following the 2006 season).

FSU and Auburn met in the last BCS Championship Game in January 2014. The Seminoles, led by coach Jimbo Fisher (an ex-Auburn assistant) and Heisman Trophy winning quarterback Jameis Winston, rallied from a 21-3 deficit to win 34-31 at the Rose Bowl. The College Football Playoff replaced the BCS the next year.
