= 1988 Rice Owls football team =

American college football season

1988 Rice Owls football
- Conference: Southwest Conference
- Record: 0–11 (0–7 SWC)
- Head coach: Jerry Berndt (3rd season)
- Defensive coordinator: Ron Chismar (2nd season)
- Home stadium: Rice Stadium

1988 Southwest Conference football standings
	Conf.					Overall
Team	W		L		T	W		L		T
No. 12 Arkansas $	7	–	0	–	0	10	–	2	–	0
Texas A&M*	6	–	1	–	0	7	–	5	–	0
No. 18 Houston	5	–	2	–	0	9	–	3	–	0
Texas Tech	4	–	3	–	0	5	–	6	–	0
Baylor	2	–	5	–	0	6	–	5	–	0
Texas	2	–	5	–	0	4	–	7	–	0
TCU	2	–	5	–	0	4	–	7	–	0
Rice	0	–	7	–	0	0	–	11	–	0
$ – Conference champion; *- Ineligible for conference championship and postseason bowl games due to NCAA sanctions.; Rankings from AP Poll

The 1988 Rice Owls football team represented Rice University as a member of the Southwest Conference (SWC) during the 1988 NCAA Division I-A football season. Led by Jerry Berndt in his third and final season as head coach, the Owls compiled an overall record of 0–11, with a mark of 0–7 in conference play, placing last out of eight teams in the SWC. Rice played home games at Rice Stadium in Houston.

== Schedule ==
Date	Opponent	Site	Result	Attendance	Source
September 10	Indiana*	Rice Stadium; Houston, TX	L 14–41	17,300	
September 24	at Southwestern Louisiana*	Cajun Field; Lafayette, LA	L 16–41	24,300	
October 1	Texas	Rice Stadium; Houston, TX	L 13–20	35,000	
October 8	at TCU	Amon G. Carter Stadium; Fort Worth, TX	L 10–21	25,102	
October 15	Texas Tech	Rice Stadium; Houston, TX	L 36–38	10,500	
October 22	at Texas A&M	Kyle Field; College Station, TX	L 10–24	53,727	
October 29	at No. 11 Arkansas	War Memorial Stadium; Little Rock, AR	L 14–21	50,612	
November 5	No. 1 Notre Dame*	Notre Dame Stadium; Notre Dame, IN	L 11–54	59,075	
November 12	Baylor	Rice Stadium; Houston, TX	L 10–20	13,200	
November 19	No. 12 (I-AA) North Texas*	Rice Stadium; Houston, TX	L 17–33	8,500	
November 26	at No. 14 Houston	Houston Astrodome; Houston, TX (rivalry)	L 14–45	16,923	
*Non-conference game; Rankings from AP Poll released prior to the game
