= 1988 Duke Blue Devils football team =

American college football season

1988 Duke Blue Devils football
- Conference: Atlantic Coast Conference
- Record: 7–3–1 (3–3–1 ACC)
- Head coach: Steve Spurrier (2nd season)
- Offensive scheme: Fun and gun
- Defensive coordinator: Rick Johnson (1st season)
- Base defense: 4–3
- MVP: Anthony Dilweg
- Captains: Wayne Charles; Anthony Dilweg; Jeff Patten
- Home stadium: Wallace Wade Stadium

1988 Atlantic Coast Conference football standings
	Conf.					Overall
Team	W		L		T	W		L		T
No. 9 Clemson $	6	–	1	–	0	10	–	2	–	0
Virginia	5	–	2	–	0	7	–	4	–	0
NC State	4	–	2	–	1	8	–	3	–	1
Wake Forest	4	–	3	–	0	6	–	4	–	1
Maryland	4	–	3	–	0	5	–	6	–	0
Duke	3	–	3	–	1	7	–	3	–	1
North Carolina	1	–	6	–	0	1	–	10	–	0
Georgia Tech	0	–	7	–	0	3	–	8	–	0
$ – Conference champion; Rankings from AP Poll

The 1988 Duke Blue Devils football team represented Duke University as a member of the Atlantic Coast Conference (ACC) during the 1988 NCAA Division I-A football season. Led by second-year head coach Steve Spurrier, the Blue Devils compiled an overall record of 7–3–1 with a mark of 3–3–1 in conference play, and finished sixth in the ACC. Duke played home games at Wallace Wade Stadium in Durham, North Carolina.

== Schedule ==
Date	Time	Opponent	Site	TV	Result	Attendance	Source
September 3	7:00 p.m.	at Northwestern*	Dyche Stadium; Evanston, IL	SV	W 31–21	24,713	
September 10		at Tennessee*	Neyland Stadium; Knoxville, TN		W 31–26	93,144	
September 17		The Citadel*	Wallace Wade Stadium; Durham, NC		W 41–17	12,400	
September 24		Virginia	Wallace Wade Stadium; Durham, NC		W 38–34	20,200	
October 1		at Vanderbilt*	Vanderbilt Stadium; Nashville, TN		W 17–15	39,372	
October 15	4:00 p.m.	at No. 11 Clemson	Memorial Stadium; Clemson, SC	ESPN	L 17–49	83,356	
October 22		Maryland^{†}	Wallace Wade Stadium; Durham, NC		L 24–34	23,800	
October 29		at Georgia Tech	Bobby Dodd Stadium; Atlanta, GA		W 31–21	40,393	
November 5		Wake Forest	Wallace Wade Stadium; Durham, NC (rivalry)		L 16–35	35,500	
November 12		at NC State	Carter–Finley Stadium; Raleigh, NC (rivalry)		T 43–43	52,000	
November 19		North Carolina	Wallace Wade Stadium; Durham, NC (Victory Bell)		W 35–29	28,400	
*Non-conference game; ^{†}Homecoming; Rankings from AP Poll released prior to the game; All times are in Eastern time

== Personnel ==
1988 Duke Blue Devils football team roster
Players			Coaches
Offense: Pos. / # / Name / Class; QB / 8 / Anthony Dilweg / Sr	Defense: Pos. / # / Name / Class	Special teams: Pos. / # / Name / Class	Head coach: Steve Spurrier; Coordinators/assistant coaches: Rod Broadway (DL); Legend: (C) Team captain; (S) Suspended; (I) Ineligible; Injured; Redshirt

== Awards and honors ==
- Anthony Dilweg, ACC Offensive Player of Year
- Steve Spurrier, ACC Coach of Year
