= 1988 Baylor Bears football team =

American college football season

1988 Baylor Bears football
- Conference: Southwest Conference
- Record: 6–5 (2–5 SWC)
- Head coach: Grant Teaff (17th season)
- Offensive scheme: I formation
- Defensive coordinator: Pete Fredenburg (6th season)
- Base defense: 4–4
- Home stadium: Floyd Casey Stadium

1988 Southwest Conference football standings
	Conf.					Overall
Team	W		L		T	W		L		T
No. 12 Arkansas $	7	–	0	–	0	10	–	2	–	0
Texas A&M*	6	–	1	–	0	7	–	5	–	0
No. 18 Houston	5	–	2	–	0	9	–	3	–	0
Texas Tech	4	–	3	–	0	5	–	6	–	0
Baylor	2	–	5	–	0	6	–	5	–	0
Texas	2	–	5	–	0	4	–	7	–	0
TCU	2	–	5	–	0	4	–	7	–	0
Rice	0	–	7	–	0	0	–	11	–	0
$ – Conference champion; *- Ineligible for conference championship and postseason bowl games due to NCAA sanctions.; Rankings from AP Poll

The 1988 Baylor Bears football team represented Baylor University as a member of the Southwest Conference (SWC) during the 1988 NCAA Division I-A football season. Led by 17th-year head coach Grant Teaff, the Bears compiled an overall record of 6–5 with a mark of 2–5 in conference play, placing in a three-way tie for fifth in the SWC. The team played home games at Floyd Casey Stadium in Waco, Texas. The stadium name was officially changed from Baylor Stadium to Floyd Casey Stadium during halftime of the homecoming game against Arkansas on November 5.

== Schedule ==
Date	Opponent	Site	TV	Result	Attendance	Source
September 3	UNLV*	Baylor Stadium; Waco, TX		W 27–3	25,610	
September 10	at Kansas*	Memorial Stadium; Lawrence, KS	Raycom	W 27–14	43,200	
September 17	at Iowa State*	Cyclone Stadium; Ames, IA	Raycom	W 35–0	42,913	
September 24	at Texas Tech	Jones Stadium; Lubbock, TX (rivalry)		L 6–36	45,385	
October 1	Houston	Baylor Stadium; Waco, TX (rivalry)	Raycom	L 24–27	34,719	
October 8	Southwest Texas State*	Baylor Stadium; Waco, TX		W 45–7	22,473	
October 15	at Texas A&M	Kyle Field; College Station, TX (Battle of the Brazos)		L 14–28	67,884	
October 22	at TCU	Amon G. Carter Stadium; Fort Worth, TX (rivalry)		L 14–24	25,221	
November 5	No. 11 Arkansas^{†}	Floyd Casey Stadium; Waco, TX	HSE	L 3–33	40,148	
November 12	at Rice	Rice Stadium; Houston, TX		W 20–10	13,200	
November 19	Texas	Floyd Casey Stadium; Waco, TX (rivalry)		W 17–14	30,142	
*Non-conference game; ^{†}Homecoming; Rankings from AP Poll released prior to the game

== After the season ==
The following players were drafted into professional football following the season.

Player	Position	Round	Pick	Franchise
Ray Crockett	Defensive back	4	86	Detroit Lions
John Simpson	Wide receiver	10	277	Chicago Bears
