= 1988 North Carolina Tar Heels football team =

American college football season

1988 North Carolina Tar Heels football
- Conference: Atlantic Coast Conference
- Record: 1–10 (1–6 ACC)
- Head coach: Mack Brown (1st season)
- Offensive scheme: Multiple
- Defensive coordinator: Carl Torbush (1st season)
- Base defense: 4–3
- Captains: Bryan Causey; Jeff Garnica; Antonio Goss; Creighton Incorminias; John Keller; Mitch Wike
- Home stadium: Kenan Memorial Stadium

1988 Atlantic Coast Conference football standings
	Conf.					Overall
Team	W		L		T	W		L		T
No. 9 Clemson $	6	–	1	–	0	10	–	2	–	0
Virginia	5	–	2	–	0	7	–	4	–	0
NC State	4	–	2	–	1	8	–	3	–	1
Wake Forest	4	–	3	–	0	6	–	4	–	1
Maryland	4	–	3	–	0	5	–	6	–	0
Duke	3	–	3	–	1	7	–	3	–	1
North Carolina	1	–	6	–	0	1	–	10	–	0
Georgia Tech	0	–	7	–	0	3	–	8	–	0
$ – Conference champion; Rankings from AP Poll

The 1988 North Carolina Tar Heels football team represented the University of North Carolina at Chapel Hill during the 1988 NCAA Division I-A football season. The Tar Heels played their home games at Kenan Memorial Stadium in Chapel Hill, North Carolina and competed in the Atlantic Coast Conference. The team was led by head coach Mack Brown, in his first year at UNC.

== Schedule ==
Date	Time	Opponent	Site	TV	Result	Attendance	Source
September 3	7:00 p.m.	at No. 19 South Carolina*	Williams–Brice Stadium; Columbia, SC (rivalry)		L 10–31	73,275	
September 10	5:00 p.m.	No. 4 Oklahoma*	Kenan Memorial Stadium; Chapel Hill, NC	ESPN	L 0–28	53,675	
September 24	4:00 p.m.	Louisville*	Kenan Memorial Stadium; Chapel Hill, NC		L 34–38	49,900	
October 1	2:30 p.m.	at No. 4 Auburn*	Jordan-Hare Stadium; Auburn, AL		L 21–47	73,611	
October 8	7:00 p.m.	at Wake Forest	Groves Stadium; Winston-Salem, NC (rivalry)		L 24–42	33,500	
October 15	12:00 p.m.	NC State	Kenan Memorial Stadium; Chapel Hill, NC (rivalry)	JPS	L 3–48	52,508	
October 22	2:00 p.m.	Georgia Tech	Kenan Memorial Stadium; Chapel Hill, NC		W 20–17	42,000	
October 29	12:00 p.m.	Maryland	Kenan Memorial Stadium; Chapel Hill, NC		L 38–41	45,000	
November 5	12:00 p.m.	at No. 17 Clemson	Memorial Stadium; Clemson, SC	JPS	L 14–37	78,369	
November 12	2:00 p.m.	Virginia	Kenan Memorial Stadium; Chapel Hill, NC (South's Oldest Rivalry)		L 24–27	45,000	
November 19	12:05 p.m.	at Duke	Wallace Wade Stadium; Durham, NC (Victory Bell)		L 29–35	28,400	
*Non-conference game; Rankings from AP Poll released prior to the game; All times are in Eastern time

== Personnel ==
1988 North Carolina Tar Heels football team roster
Players
Coaches
Offense

Pos.	#	Name	Class
FB	34	Michael Benefield	So
WR		Eric Blount
OL		Tim Brooks
QB		Todd Burnett
WR		Reggie Clark
OL		Dennis Clemons
OL		Pat Crowley
RB		Tom Dorn
OL		Eric Garnica
WR		Kurt Green
QB		Jonathan Hall
OL		Darrell Hamilton
TE		Damon Hueston
OL		Creighton Incorminias
TE		John Keller
WR		Randy Marriott
RB		Kenard Martin
QB		Deems May
WR		Freddy Renken
RB		Aaron Staples
OL		Steve Steinbacher
RB		James Thompson
OL		Carl Watts

Defense

Pos.	#	Name	Class
DB	26	Skeet Baldwin	Jr
DT	92	Roy Barker	Fr
DB		Victor Bullock
DB		Clarence Carter
LB		Karekin Cunningham
DB		Terrence Fedd
LB		Eric Gash
LB		Antonio Goss
DL		Cecil Gray
DB		Stuffy Hewitt
LB		Dwight Hollier
DL		Chris Jacobs
DB		Doxie Jordan
LB		John Reed
LB		Bernard Timmons
DL		Dennis Tripp
DB		Dan Vooletich
DB		Larry Whiteside

Special teams

Pos.	#	Name	Class
K	1	Matt Anderson	So
K		Hamp Greene
K		Clint Gwaltney
P		Scott McAlister

Head coach

- Mack Brown

Coordinators/assistant coaches

- Carl Torbush
  Defensive coordinator/linebackers
- Darrell Moody
  Running backs

Legend

- (C) Team captain
- (S) Suspended
- (I) Ineligible
- Injured
- Redshirt

Roster

== Season summary ==
=== Oklahoma ===
#4 Oklahoma Sooners (0–0) at North Carolina Tar Heels (0–1)

Quarter	1	2	3	4	Total
Oklahoma	14	7	7	0	28
North Carolina	0	0	0	0	0

at Kenan Memorial Stadium, Chapel Hill, North Carolina

- Date: September 10, 1988
- Game attendance: 53,675
- TV announcers (ESPN): Chris Fowler

External videos
- Game highlights

Team	Category	Player	Statistics
Oklahoma	Passing	Jamelle Holieway	2/3, 61 Yds
Oklahoma	Rushing	Anthony Stafford	12 Rush, 88 Yds, TD
Oklahoma	Receiving	Eric Bross	3 Rec, 72 Yds
North Carolina	Passing	Deems May	9/19, 87 Yds, INT
North Carolina	Rushing	Jonathan Hall	10 Rush, 44 Yds
North Carolina	Receiving	Randy Marriott	4 Rec, 64 Yds

Scoring summary

Quarter	Time	Drive			Team	Scoring information	Score	
Quarter	Time	Plays	Yards	TOP	Team	Scoring information	OU	UNC
1					Oklahoma	Leon Perry 2-yard touchdown run, R.D. Lashar kick good	7	0
1					Oklahoma	Charles Thompson 8-yard touchdown run, R.D. Lashar kick good	14	0
2					Oklahoma	Anthony Stafford 1-yard touchdown run, R.D. Lashar kick good	21	0
3					Oklahoma	Jamelle Holieway 4-yard touchdown run, R.D. Lashar kick good	28	0
"TOP" = time of possession. For other American football terms, see Glossary of American football.							28	0
