= 1988 Aloha Bowl =

American college football game

1988 Eagle Aloha Bowl
Washington State Cougars	Houston Cougars
(8–3)	(9–2)
Pac-10	SWC
24	22
Head coach: Dennis Erickson	Head coach: Jack Pardee
AP / Coaches; 18 / 18	AP / Coaches; 14 / 14
	1	2	3	4	Total
Washington State	0	24	0	0	24
Houston	3	6	6	7	22
- Date: December 25, 1988
- Season: 1988
- Stadium: Aloha Stadium
- Location: Honolulu, Hawaii
- MVP: Victor Wood (WR, WSU)
- Favorite: Houston by 4½ points
- Referee: John Laurie (Big Eight)
- Attendance: 35,132

United States TV coverage
- Network: ABC
- Announcers: Keith Jackson, Lynn Swann

The 1988 Eagle Aloha Bowl was a college football bowl game, the fourth of seventeen in the bowl season of the 1988 NCAA Division I-A football season. The seventh edition of the Aloha Bowl, it was played on December 25 at Aloha Stadium in Honolulu, Hawaii. The game matched the #14 Houston Cougars of the Southwest Conference against the #18 Washington State Cougars of the Pacific-10 Conference.

Underdog Washington State scored all of its points in the second quarter and forced a last-second Houston turnover in notching a 24–22 win on Christmas Day. The bowl appearance was Washington State's second of the 1980s and was the first bowl victory for Washington State since the 1916 Rose Bowl. This was the final game for head coach Dennis Erickson at WSU; he left for the University of Miami in March.

Washington State climbed up to sixteenth in the final AP poll, and Houston dropped to eighteenth.

== Scoring ==
First quarter

- Houston – Roman Anderson 27-yard field goal (13:13). 3-0 UH

Second quarter

- WSU – Victor Wood 5-yard fumble run (Jason Hanson kick). (13:39). 7-3 WSU
- WSU – Wood 15-yard pass from Timm Rosenbach (Hanson kick). (8:39). 14-3 WSU
- WSU – Hanson 33-yard field goal (6:31), 17-3 WSU
- Houston – Chuck Weatherspoon 1-yard run (kick failed), (4:56), 17-9 WSU
- WSU – Rosenbach 1-yard run (Hanson kick), (0:53), 24-9 WSU

Third quarter

- Houston – Kevin Mason 53-yard pass from David Dacus (pass failed), (4:25), 24-15 WSU

Fourth quarter

- Houston – Weatherspoon 2-yard pass from Dacus (Anderson kick), (13:16), 24-22 WSU

== Statistics ==
Statistics	Washington State	Houston
First downs	23	13
Rushes–yards	56–154	21–68
Passing yards	306	241
Passes (C–A–I)	19–36–1	17–40–2
Total yards	460	309
Fumbles–lost	2–1	2–1
Turnovers by	2	3
Punts–average	6–46.0	8–45.4
Penalties–yards	11–95	9–58
Time of possession	37:43	22:17
