= 1988 Texas A&M Aggies football team =

American college football season

1988 Texas A&M Aggies football
- Conference: Southwest Conference
- Record: 7–5 (6–1 SWC)
- Head coach: Jackie Sherrill (7th season)
- Offensive scheme: Multiple
- Defensive coordinator: R. C. Slocum (8th season)
- Base defense: 3–4
- Home stadium: Kyle Field

1988 Southwest Conference football standings
| | Conf. | | | | | Overall |
| Team | W | | L | | T | W | | L | | T |
|---|---|---|---|---|---|---|---|---|---|---|
| No. 12 Arkansas $ | 7 | – | 0 | – | 0 | 10 | – | 2 | – | 0 |
| Texas A&M* | 6 | – | 1 | – | 0 | 7 | – | 5 | – | 0 |
| No. 18 Houston | 5 | – | 2 | – | 0 | 9 | – | 3 | – | 0 |
| Texas Tech | 4 | – | 3 | – | 0 | 5 | – | 6 | – | 0 |
| Baylor | 2 | – | 5 | – | 0 | 6 | – | 5 | – | 0 |
| Texas | 2 | – | 5 | – | 0 | 4 | – | 7 | – | 0 |
| TCU | 2 | – | 5 | – | 0 | 4 | – | 7 | – | 0 |
| Rice | 0 | – | 7 | – | 0 | 0 | – | 11 | – | 0 |
$ – Conference champion; *- Ineligible for conference championship and postseason bowl games due to NCAA sanctions.; Rankings from AP Poll

The 1988 Texas A&M Aggies football team represented Texas A&M University as a member of the Southwest Conference (SWC) during the 1988 NCAA Division I-A football season. Led by Jackie Sherrill in his seventh and final season as head coach, the Aggies compiled an overall record of 7–5 with a mark of 6–1 in conference play, placing second in the SWC. Texas A&M played home games at Kyle Field in College Station, Texas.

== Schedule ==
| Date | Opponent | Rank | Site | TV | Result | Attendance | Source |
|---|---|---|---|---|---|---|---|
| August 27 | vs. No. 2 Nebraska* | No. 10 | Giants Stadium; East Rutherford, NJ (Kickoff Classic) | Raycom | L 14–23 | 58,172 | |
| September 3 | at No. 17 LSU* | No. 11 | Tiger Stadium; Baton Rouge, LA (rivalry) | PPV | L 0–27 | 79,018 | |
| September 24 | at No. 18 Oklahoma State* | | Lewis Field; Stillwater, OK | | L 15–52 | 50,440 | |
| October 1 | Texas Tech | | Kyle Field; College Station, TX | | W 50–15 | 63,822 | |
| October 8 | at Houston | | Houston Astrodome; Houston, TX | | W 30–16 | 42,361 | |
| October 15 | Baylor | | Kyle Field; College Station, TX (Battle of the Brazos) | | W 28–14 | 67,884 | |
| October 22 | Rice | | Kyle Field; College Station, TX | | W 24–10 | 53,727 | |
| November 5 | Louisiana Tech* | | Kyle Field; College Station, TX | | W 56–17 | 48,023 | |
| November 12 | at No. 11 Arkansas | | Razorback Stadium; Fayetteville, AR (rivalry) | | L 20–25 | 53,818 | |
| November 19 | TCU | | Kyle Field; College Station, TX (rivalry) | Raycom | W 18–0 | 52,969 | |
| November 24 | at Texas | | Texas Memorial Stadium; Austin, TX (rivalry) | ESPN | W 28–24 | 77,809 | |
| December 1 | No. 20 Alabama* | | Kyle Field; College Station, TX | ESPN | L 10–30 | 59,152 | |
*Non-conference game; Rankings from AP Poll released prior to the game

== Roster ==
1988 Texas A&M Aggies football team roster
| Players | | | Coaches |
|---|---|---|---|
| Offense: Pos. / # / Name / Class; QB / / Bucky Richardson / So | Defense: Pos. / # / Name / Class | Special teams: Pos. / # / Name / Class | Head coach: Jackie Sherrill; Coordinators/assistant coaches: George Pugh (assistant); Legend: (C) Team captain; (S) Suspended; (I) Ineligible; Injured; Redshirt |
