= 1988 Texas Longhorns football team =

American college football season

1988 Texas Longhorns football
- Conference: Southwest Conference
- Record: 4–7 (2–5 SWC)
- Head coach: David McWilliams (2nd season)
- Offensive coordinator: John Mize (2nd season)
- Defensive coordinator: Paul Jette (2nd season)
- Home stadium: Texas Memorial Stadium

1988 Southwest Conference football standings
	Conf.					Overall
Team	W		L		T	W		L		T
No. 12 Arkansas $	7	–	0	–	0	10	–	2	–	0
Texas A&M*	6	–	1	–	0	7	–	5	–	0
No. 18 Houston	5	–	2	–	0	9	–	3	–	0
Texas Tech	4	–	3	–	0	5	–	6	–	0
Baylor	2	–	5	–	0	6	–	5	–	0
Texas	2	–	5	–	0	4	–	7	–	0
TCU	2	–	5	–	0	4	–	7	–	0
Rice	0	–	7	–	0	0	–	11	–	0
$ – Conference champion; *- Ineligible for conference championship and postseason bowl games due to NCAA sanctions.; Rankings from AP Poll

The 1988 Texas Longhorns football team represented the University of Texas at Austin in the 1988 NCAA Division I-A football season. The Longhorns finished the season with a 4–7 record.

== Schedule ==
Date	Time	Opponent	Rank	Site	TV	Result	Attendance	Source
September 8	7:00 p.m.	at BYU*	No. 19	Cougar Stadium; Provo, UT	ESPN	L 6–47	64,249	
September 17	7:00 p.m.	New Mexico*		Texas Memorial Stadium; Austin, TX	HSE	W 47–0	55,630	
September 24	7:00 p.m.	No. 1 (I-AA) North Texas*		Texas Memorial Stadium; Austin, TX	HSE	W 27–24	60,152	
October 1	6:00 p.m.	at Rice		Rice Stadium; Houston, TX (rivalry)		W 20–13	35,000	
October 8	1:30 p.m.	vs. No. 10 Oklahoma*		Cotton Bowl; Dallas, TX (Red River Shootout)	CBS	L 13–28	75,587	
October 15	1:00 p.m.	No. 17 Arkansas		Texas Memorial Stadium; Austin, TX (rivalry)	HSE	L 24–27	73,451	
October 29	12:00 p.m.	at Texas Tech		Jones Stadium; Lubbock, TX (rivalry)	Raycom	L 32–33	49,682	
November 5	12:00 p.m.	Houston		Texas Memorial Stadium; Austin, TX	Raycom	L 15–66	69,600	
November 12	12:00 p.m.	at TCU		Amon G. Carter Stadium; Fort Worth, TX (rivalry)	Raycom	W 30–21	29,083	
November 19	1:00 p.m.	at Baylor		Floyd Casey Stadium; Waco, TX (rivalry)		L 14–17	30,142	
November 24	7:00 p.m.	Texas A&M		Texas Memorial Stadium; Austin, TX (rivalry)	ESPN	L 24–28	77,809	
*Non-conference game; Rankings from AP Poll released prior to the game; All times are in Central time

== Game summaries ==
=== At BYU ===
#19 Texas Longhorns (0–0) at BYU Cougars (0–1)

Quarter	1	2	3	4	Total
Texas	3	3	0	0	6
BYU	10	10	7	20	47

at Cougar Stadium, Provo, Utah

- Date: September 8, 1988
- Game time: 6:00 p.m.
- Game weather: Clear, 87 °F (31 °C)
- Game attendance: 64,249
- Referee: Pat Sweeney
- TV: ESPN
- Box Score, Box Score

Game information

First quarter

- BYU – Bryce Doman 89-yard pass from Sean Covey (Earl Kauffman kick), 11:30. BYU 7–0.
- BYU – Earl Kauffman 31-yard field goal, 7:41. BYU 10–0.
- UT – Wayne Clements 41-yard field goal, 1:35. BYU 10–3.

Second quarter

- BYU – Chuck Cutler 52-yard pass from Sean Covey (Earl Kauffman kick), 14:18. BYU 17–3.
- BYU – Earl Kauffman 51-yard field goal, 12:38. BYU 20–3.
- UT – Wayne Clements 55-yard field goal, 10:47. BYU 20–6.

Third quarter

- BYU – Rodney Rice 70-yard interception return (Earl Kauffman kick), 2:16. BYU 27–6.

Fourth quarter

- BYU – Fred Whittingham 20-yard run (Earl Kauffman kick), 10:03. BYU 34–6.
- BYU – Chuck Cutler 20-yard pass from Ty Detmer (Earl Kauffman kick), 6:59. BYU 41–6.
- BYU – Eric Mortensen 17-yard run (kick failed), 4:54. BYU 47–6.

Top passers

- UT – Shannon Kelley – 11/32, 137 yards, 2 INT
- BYU – Sean Covey – 14/38, 323 yards, 2 TD, INT

Top rushers

- UT – Darron Norris – 14 rushes, 49 yards
- BYU – Fred Whittingham – 7 rushes, 63 yards

Top receivers

- UT – Tony Jones – 6 receptions, 107 yards
- BYU – Bryce Doman – 3 receptions, 124 yards, TD

External videos
- Full game
- Game highlights

=== vs Oklahoma ===
#10 Oklahoma Sooners (3–1) vs. Texas Longhorns (3–1)

Quarter	1	2	3	4	Total
Texas	0	0	7	6	13
Oklahoma	6	8	7	7	28

at Cotton Bowl, Dallas, Texas

- Date: October 8, 1988
- Game time: 1:45 p.m.
- Game weather: Light rain, 57 °F (14 °C)
- Game attendance: 75,587
- Referee: Sam Maphis
- Box Score, Box Score

Team	Category	Player	Statistics
Texas	Passing	Shannon Kelley	22/35, 198 Yds, TD, 3 INT
Texas	Rushing	Eric Metcalf	15 Rush, 89 Yds
Texas	Receiving	Kerry Cash	2 Rec, 99 Yds
Oklahoma	Passing		
Oklahoma	Rushing	Leon Perry	18 Rush, 118 Yds, TD
Oklahoma	Receiving		

Scoring summary

Quarter	Time	Drive			Team	Scoring information	Score	
Quarter	Time	Plays	Yards	TOP	Team	Scoring information	UT	OU
1	2:06				Oklahoma	Leon Perry 2-yard touchdown run, R.D. Lashar kick no good (blocked)	0	6
2	10:28	2	92		Oklahoma	Anthony Stafford 86-yard touchdown run, 2-point run good	0	14
3	9:17	11	70		Texas	Eric Metcalf 4-yard touchdown reception from Shannon Kelley, Wayne Clements kick good	7	14
3	6:24				Oklahoma	Interception returned 26 yards for touchdown by Kert Kasper, R.D. Lashar kick good	7	21
4	14:47				Texas	48-yard field goal by Wayne Clements	10	21
4	9:52				Texas	34-yard field goal by Wayne Clements	13	21
4	6:53		81		Oklahoma	Charles Thompson 8-yard touchdown run, R.D. Lashar kick good	13	28
"TOP" = time of possession. For other American football terms, see Glossary of American football.							13	28

== Personnel ==
1988 Texas Longhorns football team roster
Players
Coaches
Offense

Pos.	#	Name	Class
WR		Kerry Cash
OL	79	Chuck Johnson	Fr
QB		Shannon Kelley
RB		Eric Metcalf

Defense

Pos.	#	Name	Class
DB		Willie Mack Garza

Special teams

Pos.	#	Name	Class
K		Wayne Clements

Head coach

- David McWilliams

Coordinators/assistant coaches

Legend

- (C) Team captain
- (S) Suspended
- (I) Ineligible
- Injured
- Redshirt
