= 1988 NC State Wolfpack football team =

American college football season

1988 NC State Wolfpack football

Peach Bowl, W 28–23 vs. Iowa
- Conference: Atlantic Coast Conference
- Record: 8–3–1 (4–2–1 ACC)
- Head coach: Dick Sheridan (3rd season)
- Home stadium: Carter–Finley Stadium

1988 Atlantic Coast Conference football standings
	Conf.					Overall
Team	W		L		T	W		L		T
No. 9 Clemson $	6	–	1	–	0	10	–	2	–	0
Virginia	5	–	2	–	0	7	–	4	–	0
NC State	4	–	2	–	1	8	–	3	–	1
Wake Forest	4	–	3	–	0	6	–	4	–	1
Maryland	4	–	3	–	0	5	–	6	–	0
Duke	3	–	3	–	1	7	–	3	–	1
North Carolina	1	–	6	–	0	1	–	10	–	0
Georgia Tech	0	–	7	–	0	3	–	8	–	0
$ – Conference champion; Rankings from AP Poll

The 1988 NC State Wolfpack football team represented North Carolina State University during the 1988 NCAA Division I-A football season. The team's head coach was Dick Sheridan. NC State has been a member of the Atlantic Coast Conference (ACC) since the league's inception in 1953. The Wolfpack played its home games in 1988 at Carter–Finley Stadium in Raleigh, North Carolina, which has been NC State football's home stadium since 1966.

== Schedule ==
Date	Time	Opponent	Site	TV	Result	Attendance	Source
September 3		Western Carolina*	Carter–Finley Stadium; Raleigh, NC		W 45–6	40,300	
September 17	7:00 p.m.	Wake Forest	Carter–Finley Stadium; Raleigh, NC (rivalry)		W 14–6	48,000	
September 24		at Maryland	Byrd Stadium; College Park, MD		L 26–30	32,291	
October 1		at Georgia Tech	Bobby Dodd Stadium; Atlanta, GA	Raycom	W 14–6	36,892	
October 8		East Tennessee State*	Carter–Finley Stadium; Raleigh, NC		W 49–0	39,300	
October 15		at North Carolina	Kenan Memorial Stadium; Chapel Hill, NC (rivalry)		W 48–3	52,508	
October 22	1:00 p.m.	No. 9 Clemson	Carter–Finley Stadium; Raleigh, NC (Textile Bowl)		W 10–3	55,000	
October 29		No. 17 South Carolina*	Carter–Finley Stadium; Raleigh, NC	ESPN	L 7–23	54,800	
November 5		at Virginia	Scott Stadium; Charlottesville, VA		L 14–19	50,329	
November 12		Duke	Carter–Finley Stadium; Raleigh, NC (rivalry)		T 43–43	52,000	
November 19	1:00 p.m.	Pittsburgh*	Carter–Finley Stadium; Raleigh, NC		W 14–3	39,300	
December 31		vs. Iowa*	Atlanta–Fulton County Stadium; Atlanta, GA (Peach Bowl)	Mizlou	W 28–23	44,635	
*Non-conference game; Rankings from AP Poll released prior to the game

== Personnel ==
1988 NC State Wolfpack football team roster
Players			Coaches
Offense: Pos. / # / Name / Class; QB / / Charles Davenport	Defense: Pos. / # / Name / Class	Special teams: Pos. / # / Name / Class	Head coach: Dick Sheridan; Coordinators/assistant coaches Legend: (C) Team captain; (S) Suspended; (I) Ineligible; Injured; Redshirt
