= 1988 Clemson Tigers football team =

American college football season

1988 Clemson Tigers football

ACC champion Florida Citrus Bowl champion

Florida Citrus Bowl, W 13–6 vs. Oklahoma
- Conference: Atlantic Coast Conference

Ranking
- Coaches: No. 8
- AP: No. 9
- Record: 10–2 (6–1 ACC)
- Head coach: Danny Ford (10th full, 11th overall season)
- Offensive coordinator: Jack Crowe (3rd season)
- Captains: Rodney Williams; Donnell Woolford
- Home stadium: Memorial Stadium

1988 Atlantic Coast Conference football standings
	Conf.					Overall
Team	W		L		T	W		L		T
No. 9 Clemson $	6	–	1	–	0	10	–	2	–	0
Virginia	5	–	2	–	0	7	–	4	–	0
NC State	4	–	2	–	1	8	–	3	–	1
Wake Forest	4	–	3	–	0	6	–	4	–	1
Maryland	4	–	3	–	0	5	–	6	–	0
Duke	3	–	3	–	1	7	–	3	–	1
North Carolina	1	–	6	–	0	1	–	10	–	0
Georgia Tech	0	–	7	–	0	3	–	8	–	0
$ – Conference champion; Rankings from AP Poll

The 1988 Clemson Tigers football team represented Clemson University as a member of the Atlantic Coast Conference (ACC) during the 1988 NCAA Division I-A football season. Led by 11th–year head coach Danny Ford, the Tigers compiled an overall record of 10–2 with a mark of 6–1 in conference play, winning the ACC title for the third consecutive season. Clemson was invited to the Florida Citrus Bowl, where the Tigers defeated Oklahoma. The team played home games at Memorial Stadium in Clemson, South Carolina.

== Schedule ==
Date	Time	Opponent	Rank	Site	TV	Result	Attendance	Source
September 3	12:00 p.m.	Virginia Tech*	No. 4	Memorial Stadium; Clemson, SC	JPS	W 40–7	78,714	
September 10	1:00 p.m.	Furman*	No. 3	Memorial Stadium; Clemson, SC		W 23–3	80,620	
September 17	2:30 p.m.	No. 10 Florida State*	No. 3	Memorial Stadium; Clemson, SC (rivalry)	CBS	L 21–24	85,576	
September 24	1:00 p.m.	at Georgia Tech	No. 12	Bobby Dodd Stadium; Atlanta, GA (rivalry)		W 30–13	45,106	
October 8	1:00 p.m.	at Virginia	No. 11	Scott Stadium; Charlottesville, VA		W 10–7	42,000	
October 15	4:00 p.m.	Duke	No. 11	Memorial Stadium; Clemson, SC	ESPN	W 49–17	83,356	
October 22	1:00 p.m.	at NC State	No. 9	Carter–Finley Stadium; Raleigh, NC (Textile Bowl)		L 3–10	55,000	
October 29	1:00 p.m.	at Wake Forest	No. 15	Groves Stadium; Winston-Salem, NC		W 38–21	27,300	
November 5	12:00 p.m.	North Carolina	No. 17	Memorial Stadium; Clemson, SC	JPS	W 37–14	78,369	
November 12	12:00 p.m.	at Maryland	No. 16	Byrd Stadium; College Park, MD	JPS	W 49–25	45,000	
November 19	1:00 p.m.	South Carolina*	No. 15	Memorial Stadium; Clemson, SC (rivalry)	JPS	W 29–10	84,867	
January 2, 1989	1:30 p.m.	vs. No. 10 Oklahoma*	No. 13	Florida Citrus Bowl; Orlando, FL (Florida Citrus Bowl)	ABC	W 13–6	53,571	
*Non-conference game; Rankings from AP Poll released prior to the game; All times are in Eastern time

== Personnel ==
1988 Clemson Tigers football team roster
Players
Coaches
Offense

Pos.	#	Name	Class
TB	21	Terry Allen
OT	78	Jeff Nunamachen
QB	13	Rodney Williams (C)	Sr

Defense

Pos.	#	Name	Class
		Dexter Davis	Fr
LB		Jessie Hatcher
CB	20	Donnell Woolford	Sr

Special teams

Pos.	#	Name	Class
LS		Scott Beville
K		Chris Gardocki

Head coach

- Danny Ford

Coordinators/assistant coaches

- Jack Crowe – Offensive coordinator
- Robert McFarland – Graduate assistant

Legend

- (C) Team captain
- (S) Suspended
- (I) Ineligible
- Injured
- Redshirt
