= 1989 Cotton Bowl Classic =

1989 Mobil Cotton Bowl Classic
- 53rd Cotton Bowl Classic
- The Cotton Bowl in Dallas, Texas, hosted the Cotton Bowl Classic.
UCLA Bruins	Arkansas Razorbacks
(9–2)	(10–1)
Pac-10	SWC
17	3
Head coach: Terry Donahue	Head coach: Ken Hatfield
AP / Coaches; 9 / 9	AP / Coaches; 8 / 8
	1	2	3	4	Total
UCLA	0	14	0	3	17
Arkansas	0	0	3	0	3
- Date: January 2, 1989
- Season: 1988
- Stadium: Cotton Bowl
- Location: Dallas, Texas
- MVP: QB Troy Aikman (UCLA); LB LaSalle Harper (Arkansas)
- Referee: Gene Wurtz (WAC)
- Halftime show: UCLA Band, University of Arkansas Razorback Marching Band, Kilgore Rangerettes, U.S. Marine Band
- Attendance: 74,304

United States TV coverage
- Network: CBS
- Announcers: Verne Lundquist and Pat Haden

The 1989 Mobil Cotton Bowl Classic was a college football bowl game played on January 2, 1989, at the Cotton Bowl in Dallas. The game was played on January 2, the day after New Year's Day, since New Year's Day fell on a Sunday. The bowl game featured the Arkansas Razorbacks from the Southwest Conference and the UCLA Bruins from the Pacific-10 Conference and was televised in the United States on CBS. UCLA defeated Arkansas 17-3 for its first Cotton Bowl win. Troy Aikman, the UCLA quarterback and LaSalle Harper, an Arkansas linebacker were named the Most Valuable Players of the game.

== Game invitation ==
=== Arkansas Razorbacks ===
The 1988 Arkansas Razorbacks football team was undefeated through Southwest Conference play. In the final regular season game, the #3 Miami Hurricanes defeated the Razorbacks, 18–16. Arkansas was invited to the Cotton Bowl Classic as the winner of the Southwest Conference. Arkansas played in its first Cotton Bowl Classic since the 1976 Cotton Bowl Classic.

=== UCLA Bruins ===
Going into the UCLA–USC rivalry game, UCLA was 9-1 and had been ranked #1 for a couple of weeks earlier. Eric Ball , the 1986 Rose Bowl MVP had a crucial fumble in the UCLA vs Washington State game, when the #1 ranked Bruins were upset at home by the Cougars 34–30. The game was one of the notable ones in the UCLA–USC rivalry in that it was for the Pac-10 championship, a possible Heisman Trophy for either Troy Aikman of UCLA or Rodney Peete of USC. It was also for the Rose Bowl berth. Rodney Peete was found to have measles in the days before the game. USC used a strong ground game and "bend but don't break" defense, in front of the largest Rose Bowl Stadium regular season crowd in history, to beat the Bruins 31–22. The Cotton Bowl Classic agreed to take the team that would not be going to the 1989 Rose Bowl. UCLA was the first Pac-10 team to play in the Cotton Bowl Classic and first from the West Coast since the 1949 Cotton Bowl Classic where the University of Oregon played SMU.

== Pre-game buildup ==
Having been ranked number 1 but ultimately losing the conference championship left the Bruins and fans with unrealized expectations. It was still possible for UCLA to achieve an NCAA record seven consecutive bowl game victories, and five New Year's Day bowl game wins in seven years.

The 1989 game between UCLA and Arkansas was highly publicized in the Dallas area because UCLA quarterback Troy Aikman was expected to be the #1 pick in the NFL draft by the Dallas Cowboys. Much was made of Cowboys coach Tom Landry watching Aikman practice at Texas Stadium (UCLA's practice facility for game preparation). Head coach Ken Hatfield suspended All-American defensive end Wayne Martin and All-American offensive guard Freddie Childress days before the game, for an undisclosed violation of team rules. This severely hampered Arkansas' play on both sides of the line of scrimmage.

== Game summary ==
=== First quarter ===
No Score

=== Second quarter ===
- UCLA — Mark Estwick, one-yard run. Alfredo Velasco converts.
- UCLA — Corwin Anthony, one-yard pass from Troy Aikman. Velasco converts.

=== Third quarter ===
- Arkansas — Kendall Trainor, 49-yard field goal.

=== Fourth quarter ===
- UCLA — Alfredo Velasco, 32-yard field goal.

== Notes ==
- UCLA won its 7th consecutive bowl game, setting a new NCAA record.

== Aftermath ==
UCLA Bruins quarterback Troy Aikman completed 19 of 27 passes for 172 yards, and Bruin teammate Shawn Wills rushed for 120 yards. UCLA held Arkansas to four first downs and 42 yards, the lowest yardage total in Arkansas school history. UCLA finished number 6 in the final AP poll, and Arkansas was ranked 12. UCLA set a record for consecutive bowl victories with seven. This record was later broken by Florida State.

Tom Landry never got to draft Aikman, because he was fired the next month, but his successor, Jimmy Johnson, did draft Aikman. Aikman would go on to lead the Dallas Cowboys to three Super Bowl titles in the 1990s in his Hall of Fame career. Jimmy Johnson, coach of the Miami Hurricanes, had played at the University of Arkansas with Dallas Cowboys owner Jerry Jones.

Arkansas' Wayne Martin and Steve Atwater were also first round draft selections in the 1989 NFL Draft. Martin played twelve years for the New Orleans Saints, and Atwater won two Super Bowls of his own with the Denver Broncos and was elected to the Pro Football Hall of Fame in 2020.

Because the #2 Miami Hurricanes already had lost to #1 ranked Notre Dame, the Irish would play #3 West Virginia for the de facto national championship in the 1989 Fiesta Bowl.

In an interview with SBNation Arkansas Fight in 2009, Ken Hatfield still never specifically stated what team rules were broken to leave Freddie Childress and Wayne Martin out of the Cotton Bowl.

== Bibliography ==
- UCLA Bruins football media guide (PDF copy available at www.uclabruins.com)
