= 1988 Houston Cougars football team =

American college football season

1988 Houston Cougars football

Aloha Bowl, L 22–24 vs. Washington State
- Conference: Southwest Conference

Ranking
- AP: No. 18
- Record: 9–3 (5–2 SWC)
- Head coach: Jack Pardee (2nd season)
- Offensive coordinator: John Jenkins (2nd season)
- Offensive scheme: Run and shoot
- Defensive coordinator: Jim Eddy (2nd season)
- Base defense: 4–3
- Captains: Jet Brown; William Gant; Johnnie Jackson; Keith Jenkins
- Home stadium: Houston Astrodome

1988 Southwest Conference football standings
	Conf.					Overall
Team	W		L		T	W		L		T
No. 12 Arkansas $	7	–	0	–	0	10	–	2	–	0
Texas A&M*	6	–	1	–	0	7	–	5	–	0
No. 18 Houston	5	–	2	–	0	9	–	3	–	0
Texas Tech	4	–	3	–	0	5	–	6	–	0
Baylor	2	–	5	–	0	6	–	5	–	0
Texas	2	–	5	–	0	4	–	7	–	0
TCU	2	–	5	–	0	4	–	7	–	0
Rice	0	–	7	–	0	0	–	11	–	0
$ – Conference champion; *- Ineligible for conference championship and postseason bowl games due to NCAA sanctions.; Rankings from AP Poll

The 1988 Houston Cougars football team represented the University of Houston during the 1988 NCAA Division I-A football season. The Cougars were led by second-year head coach Jack Pardee and played their home games at the Astrodome in Houston, Texas. The team competed as members of the Southwest Conference, finishing in third. Just two seasons after finishing 1–10 (0–7 SWC), the Cougars finished the season with a 9–3 record and ranked 18th in the final AP Poll. They were invited to the 1988 Aloha Bowl in Honolulu, Hawaii, where they lost to Washington State.

== Schedule ==
Date	Opponent	Rank	Site	TV	Result	Attendance	Source
September 10	at Louisiana Tech*		Independence Stadium; Shreveport, LA		W 60–0	18,222	
September 17	at Missouri*		Faurot Field; Columbia, MO		W 31–7	36,287	
October 1	at Baylor		Baylor Stadium; Waco, TX (rivalry)	Raycom	W 27–24	34,719	
October 8	Texas A&M		Houston Astrodome; Houston, TX		L 16–30	42,361	
October 15	Tulsa*		Houston Astrodome; Houston, TX		W 82–28	14,068	
October 22	No. 13 Arkansas		Houston Astrodome; Houston, TX	Raycom	L 21–26	21,775	
October 29	TCU^{†}		Houston Astrodome; Houston, TX		W 40–12	15,582	
November 5	at Texas		Texas Memorial Stadium; Austin, TX	Raycom	W 66–15	69,600	
November 12	No. 10 Wyoming*		Houston Astrodome; Houston, TX	ESPN	W 34–10	28,947	
November 19	at Texas Tech	No. 17	Jones Stadium; Lubbock, TX (rivalry)		W 30–29	27,204	
November 26	Rice	No. 14	Houston Astrodome; Houston, TX (rivalry)	Raycom	W 45–14	16,923	
December 25	vs. No. 18 Washington State*	No. 14	Aloha Stadium; Halawa, HI (Aloha Bowl)	ABC	L 22–24	35,132	
*Non-conference game; ^{†}Homecoming; Rankings from AP Poll released prior to the game

== Roster ==
1988 Houston Cougars football team roster
Players
Coaches
Offense

Pos.	#	Name	Class
OL	52	Paul Hearn Jr.	Sr
OL		Joey Banes	Jr
WR	22	James Dixon	Sr
WR	20	Manny Hazard	So
QB	7	David Klingler	Fr
WR	20	Jason Phillips	Sr
QB	11	Andre Ware	So
RB	28	Chuck Weatherspoon	So

Defense

Pos.	#	Name	Class
LB	86	Reggie Burnette	So
DB		Chris Ellison	Jr
CB		Johnnie Jackson	Sr
LB	46	Lamar Lathon	Jr
SS	29	Alton Montgomery	Jr
DT	56	Glenn Montgomery	Sr
DT	96	Alfred Oglesby	Jr
DB		Cornelius Price
DT	63	Craig Veasey	Jr

Special teams

Pos.	#	Name	Class
K	14	Roman Anderson	Fr

Head coach

- Jack Pardee

Coordinators/assistant coaches

- John Jenkins – Offensive coordinator
- Jim Eddy – Defensive coordinator

Legend

- (C) Team captain
- (S) Suspended
- (I) Ineligible
- Injured
- Redshirt

== Team players in the NFL ==
Player	Position	Round	Pick	NFL club
Johnnie Jackson	Cornerback	5	122	San Francisco 49ers
Glenn Montgomery	Defensive tackle	5	131	Houston Oilers
Jason Phillips	Wide receiver	10	253	Detroit Lions
