= 1988 Arkansas Razorbacks football team =

American college football season

1988 Arkansas Razorbacks football

SWC champion

Cotton Bowl Classic, L 3–17 vs. UCLA
- Conference: Southwest Conference

Ranking
- Coaches: No. 13
- AP: No. 12
- Record: 10–2 (7–0 SWC)
- Head coach: Ken Hatfield (5th season)
- Offensive coordinator: David Lee (1st season)
- Offensive scheme: Option
- Defensive coordinator: Fred Goldsmith (5th season)
- Captains: Steve Atwater; John Bland; Odis Lloyd; Kerry Owens
- Home stadium: Razorback Stadium; War Memorial Stadium

1988 Southwest Conference football standings
	Conf.					Overall
Team	W		L		T	W		L		T
No. 12 Arkansas $	7	–	0	–	0	10	–	2	–	0
Texas A&M*	6	–	1	–	0	7	–	5	–	0
No. 18 Houston	5	–	2	–	0	9	–	3	–	0
Texas Tech	4	–	3	–	0	5	–	6	–	0
Baylor	2	–	5	–	0	6	–	5	–	0
Texas	2	–	5	–	0	4	–	7	–	0
TCU	2	–	5	–	0	4	–	7	–	0
Rice	0	–	7	–	0	0	–	11	–	0
$ – Conference champion; *- Ineligible for conference championship and postseason bowl games due to NCAA sanctions.; Rankings from AP Poll

The 1988 Arkansas Razorbacks football team represented the University of Arkansas as a member of the Southwest Conference (SWC) during the 1988 NCAA Division I-A football season. Led by fifth-year head coach Ken Hatfield, the Razorbacks compiled an overall record of 10–2 with a mark of 7–0 in conference play, winning the SWC title. Arkansas was invited to the Cotton Bowl Classic, where the Razorbacks lost to UCLA. The team played home games at Razorback Stadium in Fayetteville, Arkansas and War Memorial Stadium in Little Rock, Arkansas.

Defensive end Wayne Martin, safety Steve Atwater, and placekicker Kendall Trainor were all named 1st Team All-American. Senior linebacker LaSalle Harper was named defensive MVP of the Cotton Bowl, despite Arkansas losing the game.

== Schedule ==
Date	Opponent	Rank	Site	TV	Result	Attendance	Source
September 3	Pacific (CA)*		War Memorial Stadium; Little Rock, AR		W 63–14	49,600	
September 10	Tulsa*		Razorback Stadium; Fayetteville, AR		W 30–26	43,008	
September 17	Ole Miss*		War Memorial Stadium; Little Rock, AR (rivalry)		W 21–13	55,360	
October 1	TCU		Razorback Stadium; Fayetteville, AR	Raycom	W 53–10	41,240	
October 8	Texas Tech	No. 20	War Memorial Stadium; Little Rock, AR		W 31–10	49,818	
October 15	at Texas	No. 17	Texas Memorial Stadium; Austin, TX (rivalry)	HSE	W 27–24	73,451	
October 22	at Houston	No. 13	Houston Astrodome; Houston, TX	Raycom	W 26–21	21,775	
October 29	Rice	No. 11	War Memorial Stadium; Little Rock, AR		W 21–14	50,612	
November 5	at Baylor	No. 11	Floyd Casey Stadium; Waco, TX	HSE	W 33–3	40,148	
November 12	Texas A&M	No. 11	Razorback Stadium; Fayetteville, AR (rivalry)	HSE	W 25–20	53,818	
November 26	at No. 3 Miami (FL)*	No. 8	Miami Orange Bowl; Miami, FL	CBS	L 16–18	63,271	
January 2	vs. No. 9 UCLA*	No. 8	Cotton Bowl; Dallas, TX (Cotton Bowl Classic)	CBS	L 3–17	74,304	
*Non-conference game; Rankings from AP Poll released prior to the game

== Rankings ==
Ranking movements Legend: ██ Increase in ranking ██ Decrease in ranking — = Not ranked т = Tied with team above or below
	Week																
Poll	Pre	1	2	3	4	5	6	7	8	9	10	11	12	13	14	15	Final
AP	—	—	—	—	—	—	20	17	13	11	11	11	10	8	9	8	12
Coaches	—	—	—	—	—	19 т	17	15	11	11	11	11	10	8	8	8	13

== Season summary ==
=== at Texas ===
External videos
- 1988 Arkansas at Texas – Game highlights

=== at Houston ===
External videos
- 1988 Arkansas at Houston – Game highlights

=== at Miami (FL) ===
Arkansas at Miami (FL)

Team	1	2	3	4	Total
No. 8 Razorbacks	10	0	6	0	16
• No. 3 Hurricanes	10	5	0	3	18

- Date: November 26
- Location: Miami Orange Bowl,
  Miami, Florida
- Game start: 12:23 pm EST
- Elapsed time: 3:01
- Game attendance: 63,271
- Game weather: 82 °F (28 °C), Partly Sunny, Wind SE 15–20 mph (24–32 km/h)
- Referee: Mike Dover
- TV announcers (CBS Sports): Brent Musburger, Pat Haden, and John Dockery

Scoring summary
1	9:14	Miami	Huerta 36-yard field goal	Miami 3-0
1	4:43	Ark	Trainor 58-yard field goal	Tied 3-3
1	1:41	Miami	Gary 1-yard run (Huerta kick)	Miami 10-3
1	1:29	Ark	Foster 80-yard run (Trainor kick)	Tied 10-10
2	8:30	Miami	Safety, Hawkins tackles Grovey in end zone	Miami 12-10
2	0:03	Miami	Huerta 45-yard field goal	Miami 15-10
3	5:03	Ark	Foster 16-yard pass from Grovey (conversion failed)	Arkansas 16-15
4	5:38	Miami	Huerta 20-yard field goal	Miami 18-16

External videos
- 1988 Arkansas at Miami (FL) – Game broadcast

== Personnel ==
1988 Arkansas Razorbacks football team roster
Players
Coaches
Offense

Pos.	#	Name	Class
OL		Rich Apolskis
QB		John Bland
RB		Anthony Chambers
OT	72	Freddie Childress	Sr
OL		Elbert Crawford
RB	18	Barry Foster	Jr
RB		Carlos Gaston
RB		Richard Grooms
QB	4	Quinn Grovey	So
RB	34	JuJu Harshaw	Jr
OL		Mark Henry
RB		Tony Holmes
WR		Tim Horton
TE		Steve Hudson
RB		Aaron Jackson
RB		Joe Johnson	Sr
OL		Jim Mabry
OL		James Morris
RB		Kerwin Price	Fr
RB	35	James Rouse	Jr
WR	2	Derek Russell	So
QB		Jim Simpson
RB		Wayne Stewart
QB		Jimmy Williams
TE		Billy Winston

Defense

Pos.	#	Name	Class
S	27	Steve Atwater	Sr
DB		Curtis Banks
DB	9	Richard Brothers	Sr
CB		Anthony Cooney	Jr
DL		Kenny Crawford
LB		Reggie Hall
LB		LaSalle Harper	Sr
LB		Odis Lloyd
DE	83	Wayne Martin	Sr
LB		Ty Mason
LB		Kerry Owens
DL		Chad Rolen
DL		Mike Shepherd
LB		Ted Shimer
DB		Patrick Williams	Jr

Special teams

Pos.	#	Name	Class
P		Allen Meacham	Jr
K	22	Kendall Trainor	Sr

Head coach

- Ken Hatfield

Coordinators/assistant coaches

- Larry Brinson
- Fred Goldsmith
- David Lee

Legend

- (C) Team captain
- (S) Suspended
- (I) Ineligible
- Injured
- Redshirt

Roster
Last update: 2026-May-30

== 1989 NFL draft ==
Player	Position	Round	Pick	NFL club
Wayne Martin	Defensive end	1	19	New Orleans Saints
Steve Atwater	Strong safety	1	20	Denver Broncos
Fred Childress	Guard	2	55	Cincinnati Bengals
Kerry Owens	Linebacker	4	89	Cincinnati Bengals
Richard Brothers	Defensive back	7	189	Chicago Bears
Kendall Trainor	Kicker	9	234	Phoenix Cardinals
LaSalle Harper	Linebacker	9	243	Chicago Bears
