= 1988 NCAA Division I-A football rankings =

- Season: 1988
- Bowl season: 1988–89 bowl games
- Preseason No. 1: Florida State
- End of season champions: Notre Dame

Two human polls comprised the 1988 National Collegiate Athletic Association (NCAA) Division I-A football rankings. Unlike most sports, college football's governing body, the NCAA, does not bestow a national championship, instead that title is bestowed by one or more different polling agencies. There are two main weekly polls that begin in the preseason—the AP Poll and the Coaches Poll.

== Legend ==
	Increase in ranking
	Decrease in ranking
	Not ranked previous week
	National champion
(#–#)	Win–loss record
(Italics)	Number of first place votes
т	Tied with team above or below also with this symbol

== AP Poll ==
	Preseason Aug 21	Week 1 Aug 30	Week 2 Sep 6	Week 3 Sep 13	Week 4 Sep 20	Week 5 Sep 27	Week 6 Oct 4	Week 7 Oct 11	Week 8 Oct 18	Week 9 Oct 25	Week 10 Nov 1	Week 11 Nov 8	Week 12 Nov 15	Week 13 Nov 22	Week 14 Nov 29	Week 15 Dec 6	Week 16 (Final) Jan 3	
1.	Florida State (44)	Florida State (0–0) (41)	Miami (FL) (1–0) (38)	Miami (FL) (1–0) (46)	Miami (FL) (2–0) (46)	Miami (FL) (3–0) (55)	Miami (FL) (4–0) (53)	Miami (FL) (4–0) (52)	UCLA (6–0) (33)	UCLA (7–0) (35)	Notre Dame (8–0) (44)	Notre Dame (9–0) (42)	Notre Dame (9–0) (40)	Notre Dame (10–0) (35)	Notre Dame (11–0) (57)	Notre Dame (11–0) (49)	Notre Dame (12–0) (58 1/2)	1.
2.	Nebraska (2)	Nebraska (1–0) (4)	Nebraska (2–0) (14)	UCLA (2–0) (3)	UCLA (3–0) (3)	UCLA (3–0) (3)	UCLA (4–0) (3)	UCLA (5–0) (1)	Notre Dame (6–0) (22)	Notre Dame (7–0) (19)	USC (7–0) (11)	USC (8–0) (15)	USC (9–0) (18)	USC (10–0) (22)	Miami (FL) (9–1) (1)	Miami (FL) (10–1) (1)	Miami (FL) (11–1) (1 1/2)	2.
3.	Oklahoma (2)	Oklahoma (0–0) (1)	Clemson (1–0) (3)	Clemson (2–0) (4)	Oklahoma (2–0) (3)	USC (3–0) (2)	USC (4–0) (2)	USC (5–0) (3)	USC (6–0) (5)	USC (6–0) (5)	Miami (FL) (6–1) (1)	Miami (FL) (7–1) (1)	Miami (FL) (7–1) (1)	Miami (FL) (8–1) (1)	West Virginia (11–0) (2)	West Virginia (11–0) (3)	Florida State (11–1)	3.
4.	Clemson (3)	Clemson (0–0) (3)	Oklahoma (0–0) (2)	Oklahoma (1–0) (1)	Auburn (2–0) (2)	Auburn (3–0)	Auburn (4–0)	Notre Dame (5–0)	Miami (FL) (4–1)	Miami (FL) (5–1)	West Virginia (8–0) (2)	West Virginia (9–0) (1)	West Virginia (10–0)	West Virginia (11–0) (2)	Florida State (10–1)	Florida State (10–1)	Michigan (9–2–1)	4.
5.	UCLA (2)	UCLA (0–0) (2)	UCLA (1–0) (2)	USC (2–0) (1)	USC (2–0) (1)	Notre Dame (3–0)	Notre Dame (4–0)	Florida State (5–1)	Nebraska (6–1)	Nebraska (7–1)	Florida State (7–1)	Florida State (8–1)	Florida State (9–1)	Florida State (9–1)	USC (10–1)	USC (10–1)	West Virginia (11–1)	5.
6.	USC (3)	Miami (FL) (0–0) (1)	USC (1–0) (1)	Auburn (1–0)	Georgia (3–0)	Florida State (3–1)	Florida State (4–1)	West Virginia (6–0)	West Virginia (6–0)	Florida State (7–1)	UCLA (7–1)	UCLA (8–1)	UCLA (9–1)	Nebraska (11–1)	Nebraska (11–1)	Nebraska (11–1)	UCLA (10–2)	6.
7.	Auburn	Auburn (0–0)	Auburn (0–0)	Georgia (2–0)	LSU (2–0)	West Virginia (4–0)	West Virginia (5–0)	Nebraska (5–1)	Florida State (6–1)	West Virginia (7–0) (1)	Nebraska (8–1)	Nebraska (9–1)	Nebraska (10–1)	Auburn (9–1)	Auburn (10–1)	Auburn (10–1)	USC (10–2)	7.
8.	Miami (FL) (1)	USC (0–0) (1)	Georgia (1–0)	Notre Dame (1–0)	Notre Dame (2–0)	South Carolina (4–0)	South Carolina (5–0)	South Carolina (6–0)	Oklahoma (5–1)	Oklahoma (6–1)	Oklahoma (7–1)	Oklahoma (8–1)	Auburn (9–1)	Arkansas (10–0)	UCLA (9–2)	Arkansas (10–1)	Auburn (10–2)	8.
9.	Iowa (1)	Iowa (0–0)	Michigan (0–0)	LSU (1–0)	Florida State (2–1)	Nebraska (3–1)	Nebraska (4–1)	Oklahoma (4–1)	Clemson (5–1)	Auburn (6–1)	Auburn (7–1)	Auburn (8–1)	Oklahoma (9–1)	UCLA (9–2)	Arkansas (10–1)	UCLA (9–2)	Clemson (10–2)	9.
10.	Texas A&M	Michigan (0–0)	Florida State (0–1)	Florida State (1–1)	Nebraska (2–1)	Oklahoma (2–1)	Oklahoma (3–1)	Oklahoma State (4–0)	Auburn (5–1)	Wyoming (8–0)	Wyoming (9–0)	Wyoming (10–0)	Arkansas (10–0)	Oklahoma (9–2)	Oklahoma (9–2)	Oklahoma (9–2)	Nebraska (11–2)	10.
11.	Michigan (1)	Texas A&M (0–1)	LSU (1–0)	Nebraska (2–1)	West Virginia (3–0)	Clemson (3–1)	Clemson (3–1)	Clemson (4–1)	Georgia (5–1)	Arkansas (7–0)	Arkansas (8–0)	Arkansas (9–0)	LSU (7–2)	Michigan (8–2–1)	Michigan (8–2–1)	Michigan (8–2–1)	Oklahoma State (10–2)	11.
12.	Georgia	Georgia (0–0)	West Virginia (1–0)	West Virginia (2–0)	Clemson (2–1)	Alabama (2–0)	Alabama (3–0)	Auburn (4–1)	Wyoming (7–0)	Oklahoma State (5–1)	Oklahoma State (6–1)	LSU (6–2)	Michigan (7–2–1)	Oklahoma State (8–2)	Oklahoma State (8–2)	Oklahoma State (9–2)	Arkansas (10–2)	12.
13.	Notre Dame (1)	Notre Dame (0–0)	Notre Dame (0–0)	Alabama (1–0)	Alabama (1–0)	Oklahoma State (2–0)	Oklahoma State (3–0)	Georgia (5–1)	Arkansas (6–0)	LSU (4–2)	LSU (5–2)	Michigan (6–2–1)	Oklahoma State (7–2)	Clemson (9–2)	Clemson (9–2)	Clemson (9–2)	Syracuse (10–2)	13.
14.	Alabama	Alabama (0–0)	Alabama (0–0)	South Carolina (2–0)	South Carolina (3–0)	LSU (2–1)	Florida (5–0)	Wyoming (6–0)	Indiana (5–0–1)	Michigan (4–2–1)	Michigan (5–2–1)	Oklahoma State (6–2)	Syracuse (8–1)	Houston (8–2)	Houston (9–2)	Houston (9–2)	Oklahoma (9–3)	14.
15.	Michigan State	Michigan State (0–0)	Michigan State (0–0)	Michigan (0–1)	Penn State (2–0)	Georgia (3–1)	Georgia (4–1)	Michigan (3–2)	Oklahoma State (4–1)	Clemson (5–2)	South Carolina (7–1)	Syracuse (7–1)	Clemson (8–2)	Wyoming (11–1)	Wyoming (11–1)	Wyoming (11–1)	Georgia (9–3)	15.
16.	West Virginia	West Virginia (0–0)	South Carolina (1–0)	Penn State (1–0)	Pittsburgh (2–0)	Washington (3–0)	Wyoming (5–0)	Washington (4–1)	LSU (4–2)	Syracuse (6–1)	Syracuse (6–1)	Clemson (7–2)	Wyoming (10–1)	LSU (7–3)	LSU (8–3)	LSU (8–3)	Washington State (9–3)	16.
17.	Tennessee	LSU (0–0)	Iowa (0–1)	Washington (1–0)	Washington (2–0)	Florida (4–0)	Michigan (2–2)	Arkansas (5–0)	Washington (4–2)	South Carolina (6–1)	Clemson (6–2)	Georgia (7–2)	Houston (7–2)	Alabama (7–2)	Washington State (8–3)	Syracuse (9–2)	Alabama (9–3)	17.
18.	LSU	Tennessee (0–0)	Penn State (0–0)	Ohio State (1–0)	Oklahoma State (1–0)	Wyoming (4–0)	Oregon (4–0)	Indiana (4–0–1)	South Carolina (6–1)	Georgia (5–2)	Alabama (6–1)	Alabama (6–2)	Alabama (7–2)	Washington State (8–3)	Syracuse (8–2)	Washington State (8–3)	Houston (9–3)	18.
19.	South Carolina	South Carolina (0–0)	Texas (0–0)	Iowa (1–1)	Michigan (0–2)	Michigan (1–2)	Washington (3–1)	LSU (3–2)	Syracuse (5–1)	Alabama (5–1)	Georgia (6–2)	Colorado (7–2)	Washington State (7–3)	Syracuse (8–2)	Georgia (8–3)	Georgia (8–3)	LSU (8–4)	19.
20.	Penn State	Penn State (0–0)	Washington (0–0)	Oklahoma State (1–0)	Florida (3–0)	Oregon (3–0)	Arkansas (4–0)	Florida (5–1)	Michigan (3–2–1)	Oregon (6–1)	BYU (7–1) т Indiana (6–1–1) т	Washington State (5–3)	Georgia (7–3)	Georgia (7–3)	Alabama (7–3)	Alabama (8–3)	Indiana (8–3–1)	20.
	Preseason Aug 21	Week 1 Aug 30	Week 2 Sep 6	Week 3 Sep 13	Week 4 Sep 20	Week 5 Sep 27	Week 6 Oct 4	Week 7 Oct 11	Week 8 Oct 18	Week 9 Oct 25	Week 10 Nov 1	Week 11 Nov 8	Week 12 Nov 15	Week 13 Nov 22	Week 14 Nov 29	Week 15 Dec 6	Week 16 (Final) Jan 3	
		None	Dropped: Texas A&M; Tennessee	Dropped: Michigan State; Texas	Dropped: Ohio State; Iowa	Dropped: Penn State; Pittsburgh	Dropped: LSU	Dropped: Alabama; Oregon	Dropped: Florida	Dropped: Indiana; Washington	Dropped: Oregon	Dropped: South Carolina; Indiana; BYU	Dropped: Colorado	None	None	None	Dropped: Wyoming	

== Coaches Poll ==
	Preseason Aug 21	Week 1 Aug 30	Week 2 Sep 6	Week 3 Sep 13	Week 4 Sep 20	Week 5 Sep 27	Week 6 Oct 4	Week 7 Oct 11	Week 8 Oct 18	Week 9 Oct 25	Week 10 Nov 1	Week 11 Nov 8	Week 12 Nov 15	Week 13 Nov 22	Week 14 Nov 29	Week 15 Dec 6	Week 16 (Final) Jan 3	
1.	Florida State (37)	Florida State (0–0)	Miami (FL) (1–0) (29)	Miami (FL) (1–0) (37)	Miami (FL) (2–0) (45)	Miami (FL) (3–0) (45)	Miami (FL) (4–0) (43)	Miami (FL) (4–0) (44)	UCLA (6–0) (37)	UCLA (7–0) (41)	Notre Dame (8–0) (30)	Notre Dame (9–0) (32)	Notre Dame (9–0) (31)	Notre Dame (10–0) (29)	Notre Dame (11–0) (42)	Notre Dame (11–0) (42)	Notre Dame (12–0) (42)	1.
2.	Oklahoma (4)	Oklahoma (0–0)	Nebraska (2–0) (19)	UCLA (2–0) (13)	UCLA (3–0) (5)	UCLA (3–0) (7)	UCLA (4–0) (6)	UCLA (5–0) (5)	Notre Dame (6–0) (10)	Notre Dame (7–0) (8)	USC (7–0) (16)	USC (8–0) (14)	USC (9–0) (13)	USC (10–0) (16)	Miami (FL) (9–1) (2)	Miami (FL) (10–1) (3)	Miami (FL) (11–1) (2)	2.
3.	Nebraska	Nebraska (1–0)	Clemson (1–0)	Oklahoma (1–0)	Oklahoma (2–0)	USC (3–0) (1)	USC (4–0)	USC (5–0)	USC (6–0) (2)	USC (6–0)	Miami (FL) (6–1)	Miami (FL) (7–1)	Miami (FL) (7–1) (1)	Miami (FL) (8–1) (1)	West Virginia (11–0) (4)	West Virginia (11–0) (3)	Florida State (11–1) (1)	3.
4.	Clemson	Clemson (0–0)	Oklahoma (0–0)	Clemson (2–0)	USC (2–0)	Auburn (3–0)	Auburn (4–0)	Notre Dame (5–0)	Miami (FL) (4–1)	Miami (FL) (5–1)	West Virginia (8–0) (2)	West Virginia (9–0) (2)	West Virginia (10–0) (2)	West Virginia (11–0) (2)	Florida State (10–1) (1)	Florida State (10–1) (1)	Michigan (9–2–1)	4.
5.	Miami (FL) (4)	Miami (FL) (0–0)	UCLA (1–0)	USC (2–0)	Auburn (2–0)	Notre Dame (3–0)	Notre Dame (4–0)	West Virginia (6–0)	West Virginia (6–0)	Nebraska (7–1)	Nebraska (8–1)	Florida State (8–1) (1)	Florida State (8–1) (1)	Florida State (9–1) (1)	Nebraska (11–1)	USC (10–1)	West Virginia (11–1)	5.
6.	Texas A&M (1)	Texas A&M (0–1)	USC (1–0)	Georgia (2–0)	LSU (2–0)	West Virginia (4–0)	West Virginia (5–0)	Florida State (5–1)	Nebraska (6–1)	West Virginia (7–0)	UCLA (7–1)	UCLA (8–1)	UCLA (9–1)	Nebraska (11–1)	USC (10–1)	Nebraska (11–1)	UCLA (10–2)	6.
7.	Auburn	Auburn (0–0)	Auburn (0–0)	Auburn (1–0)	Georgia (3–0)	South Carolina (4–0)	Florida State (4–1)	South Carolina (6–0)	Florida State (6–1)	Florida State (7–1)	Oklahoma (7–1)	Nebraska (9–1)	Nebraska (10–1)	Auburn (9–1)	Auburn (10–1)	Auburn (10–1)	Auburn (10–2)	7.
8.	USC	USC (0–0)	Georgia (1–0)	LSU (1–0)	Notre Dame (2–0)	Florida State (3–1)	South Carolina (5–0)	Nebraska (5–1)	Oklahoma (5–1)	Oklahoma (6–1)	Florida State (7–1) (1)	Oklahoma (8–1)	Oklahoma (9–1)	Arkansas (10–0)	Arkansas (10–1)	Arkansas (10–1)	Clemson (10–2)	8.
9.	UCLA (2)	UCLA (0–0)	LSU (1–0) (1)	Notre Dame (1–0)	Florida State (2–1)	Nebraska (3–1)	Nebraska (4–1)	Oklahoma (4–1)	Auburn (5–1)	Auburn (6–1)	Auburn (7–1)	Auburn (8–1)	Auburn (9–1)	UCLA (9–2)	UCLA (9–2)	UCLA (9–2)	USC (10–2)	9.
10.	Michigan (1)	Michigan (0–0)	Michigan (0–0)	Nebraska (2–1)	West Virginia (3–0)	Oklahoma (2–1)	Oklahoma (3–1)	Oklahoma State (4–0)	Clemson (5–1)	Wyoming (8–0)	Wyoming (9–0)	Wyoming (10–0)	Arkansas (10–0)	Michigan (8–2–1)	Oklahoma (9–2)	Oklahoma (9–2)	Nebraska (11–2)	10.
11.	Iowa	Iowa (0–0)	Notre Dame (0–0)	West Virginia (2–0)	Nebraska (2–1)	Clemson (3–1)	Florida (5–0)	Clemson (4–1)	Arkansas (6–0)	Arkansas (7–0)	Arkansas (8–0)	Arkansas (9–0)	Michigan (7–2–1)	Oklahoma (9–2)	Michigan (8–2–1)	Michigan (8–2–1)	Oklahoma State (10–2)	11.
12.	Notre Dame	Notre Dame (0–0)	Florida State (0–1)	Florida State (1–1)	Clemson (2–1)	Alabama (2–0)	Clemson (3–1)	Auburn (4–1)	Wyoming (7–0)	Oklahoma State (5–1)	Oklahoma State (6–1)	Michigan (6–2–1)	LSU (7–2)	Oklahoma State (8–2)	Oklahoma State (8–2)	Oklahoma State (9–2)	Syracuse (10–2)	12.
13.	LSU	LSU (0–0)	West Virginia (1–0)	Penn State (1–0)	Penn State (2–0)	LSU (2–1)	Oklahoma State (3–0)	Georgia (5–1)	Georgia (5–1)	Syracuse (6–1)	Michigan (5–2–1)	Syracuse (7–1)	Syracuse (8–1)	Clemson (9–2)	Clemson (9–2)	Clemson (9–2)	Arkansas (10–2)	13.
14.	Georgia	Georgia (0–0)	Michigan State (0–0)	Alabama (1–0)	South Carolina (3–0)	Oklahoma State (2–0)	Alabama (3–0)	Wyoming (6–0)	Indiana (5–0–1)	Michigan (4–2–1)	Syracuse (6–1)	LSU (6–2)	Oklahoma State (7–2)	Wyoming (11–1)	Wyoming (11–1)	Houston (9–2)	Oklahoma (9–3)	14.
15.	Michigan State т	Michigan State (0–0)	South Carolina (1–0)	South Carolina (2–0)	Pittsburgh (2–0)	Florida (4–0)	Georgia (4–1)	Arkansas (5–0)	Oklahoma State (4–1)	LSU (5–2)	South Carolina (7–1)	Oklahoma State (6–2)	Clemson (8–2)	Alabama (7–2)	Houston (9–2)	Wyoming (11–1)	Georgia (9–3)	15.
16.	Penn State т	Penn State (0–0)	Alabama (0–0)	Michigan (0–1)	Alabama (1–0)	Georgia (3–1)	Wyoming (5–0)	Washington (4–1)	Syracuse (5–1)	Alabama (5–2)	LSU (5–2) т	Clemson (7–2)	Wyoming (10–1)	Houston (8–2)	Syracuse (8–2)	Syracuse (8–2)	Washington State (9–3)	16.
17.	Tennessee	Tennessee (0–0)	Penn State (0–0)	Ohio State (1–0)	Washington (2–0)	Washington (3–0)	Arkansas (4–0)	Michigan (3–2)	South Carolina (6–1)	South Carolina (6–1)	Alabama (6–1) т	Georgia (7–2)	Houston (7–2) т	LSU (7–3)	LSU (8–3)	LSU (8–3)	Alabama (9–3) т	17.
18.	South Carolina	South Carolina (0–0)	Iowa (0–1)	Florida (2–0)	Florida (3–0)	Wyoming (1–0)	Oregon (4–0)	Indiana (4–0–1)	Washington (4–2)	Clemson (5–2)	Indiana (6–1–1)	BYU (7–2)	Colorado (7–3) т	Washington State (8–3)	Washington State (8–3)	Washington State (8–3)	NC State (8–3–1) т	18.
19.	Alabama	Alabama (0–0)	Syracuse (1–0)	Washington (1–0)	Wyoming (3–0)	Arkansas (3–0) т	Washington (3–1) т	LSU (3–2)	LSU (4–2)	Oregon (6–1)	BYU (7–1)	Alabama (6–2) т	BYU (8–2)	Syracuse (8–2)	Colorado (8–3)	Georgia (8–3)	Indiana (8–3–1)	19.
20.	Texas	Texas (0–0)	Pittsburgh (1–0)	Pittsburgh (1–0)	Oklahoma State (1–0)	Michigan (1–2) т	Michigan (2–2) т	Syracuse (4–1) т Washington State (4–1) т	Washington State (4–2)	Georgia (5–2)	Clemson (6–2)	Colorado (7–2) т	Washington State (7–3)	Colorado (8–3)	Georgia (8–3)	Colorado (8–3) т; Alabama (8–3) т	Wyoming (11–2)	20.
	Preseason Aug 21	Week 1 Aug 30	Week 2 Sep 6	Week 3 Sep 13	Week 4 Sep 20	Week 5 Sep 27	Week 6 Oct 4	Week 7 Oct 11	Week 8 Oct 18	Week 9 Oct 25	Week 10 Nov 1	Week 11 Nov 8	Week 12 Nov 15	Week 13 Nov 22	Week 14 Nov 29	Week 15 Dec 6	Week 16 (Final) Jan 3	
		None	Dropped: Texas A&M; Tennessee; Texas	Dropped: Michigan State; Iowa; Syracuse	Dropped: Michigan; Ohio State	Dropped: Pittsburgh	Dropped: LSU	Dropped: Florida; Alabama; Oregon	Dropped: Michigan	Dropped: Indiana; Washington; Washington State	Dropped: Oregon; Georgia	Dropped: South Carolina; Indiana	Dropped: Georgia; Alabama	Dropped: BYU	Dropped: Alabama	None	Dropped: Houston; LSU; Colorado	
